= 2022 ITS Cup =

Tennis tournament

- Date: 18–24 July 2022
- Edition: 13th
- Category: ITF Women's World Tennis Tour
- Prize money: $60,000
- Surface: Clay / Outdoor
- Location: Olomouc, Czech Republic

Champions

Singles
- (Czech Republic) Sára Bejlek

Doubles
- (Italy) Giulia Gatto-Monticone / (Burundi) Sada Nahimana
- ITS Cup

The 2022 ITS Cup was a professional tennis tournament played on outdoor clay courts. It was the thirteenth edition of the tournament which was part of the 2022 ITF Women's World Tennis Tour. It took place in Olomouc, Czech Republic between 18 and 24 July 2022.

== Champions ==
=== Singles ===
- (Czech Republic) Sára Bejlek def. (North Macedonia) Lina Gjorcheska, 6–2, 7–6^{(7–0)}

=== Doubles ===
- (Italy) Giulia Gatto-Monticone / (Burundi) Sada Nahimana def. (Romania) Ilona Georgiana Ghioroaie / (Romania) Oana Georgeta Simion, 6–1, 1–6, [10–5]

== Singles main draw entrants ==
=== Seeds ===
Country	Player	Rank^{1}	Seed
FRA	Kristina Mladenovic	116	1
POL	Maja Chwalińska	171	2
CZE	Sára Bejlek	184	3
USA	Emma Navarro	213	4
ESP	Aliona Bolsova	214	5
CRO	Tena Lukas	215	6
SVK	Rebecca Šramková	219	7
BUL	Isabella Shinikova	233	8
JPN	Kurumi Nara	245	9
ROU	Cristina Dinu	253	10
MKD	Lina Gjorcheska	278	11
	Darya Astakhova	279	12
SLO	Dalila Jakupović	280	13
ITA	Giulia Gatto-Monticone	281	14
SUI	Conny Perrin	292	15
ESP	Guiomar Maristany	301	16

- ^{1} Rankings are as of 11 July 2022.

=== Other entrants ===
The following players received wildcards into the singles main draw:

- (Czech Republic) Natálie Augustinová
- (Czech Republic) Linda Klimovičová
- (Czech Republic) Lucie Petruželová
- (Czech Republic) Julie Štruplová
- (Czech Republic) Darja Viďmanová

The following player received entry using a protected ranking:

- (Germany) Antonia Lottner

The following players received entry from the qualifying draw:

- (Turkey) Çağla Büyükakçay
- (Austria) Melanie Klaffner
- (Switzerland) Bojana Klincov
- (Czech Republic) Gabriela Knutson
- (Slovakia) Eszter Méri
- (Germany) Julia Middendorf
- (Germany) Tayisiya Morderger
- (France) Victoria Muntean
