= 2022 ITS Cup – Singles =

Singles
- 2022 ITS Cup

Final
- Champion: (Czech Republic) Sára Bejlek
- Runner-up: (North Macedonia) Lina Gjorcheska
- Score: 6–2, 7–6^{(7–0)}

Events
Singles	Doubles
- ITS Cup

Sára Bejlek was the defending champion and successfully defended her title, defeating Lina Gjorcheska in the final, 6–2, 7–6^{(7–0)}.

== Seeds ==
All seeds receive a bye into the second round.

1. (France) Kristina Mladenovic (second round)
2. (Poland) Maja Chwalińska (quarterfinals)
3. (Czech Republic) Sára Bejlek (champion)
4. (United States) Emma Navarro (quarterfinals)
5. (Spain) Aliona Bolsova (third round)
6. (Croatia) Tena Lukas (third round)
7. (Slovakia) Rebecca Šramková (second round)
8. (Bulgaria) Isabella Shinikova (second round)
9. (Japan) Kurumi Nara (quarterfinals)
10. (Romania) Cristina Dinu (second round)
11. (North Macedonia) Lina Gjorcheska (final)
12. Darya Astakhova (semifinals)
13. (Slovenia) Dalila Jakupović (second round)
14. (Italy) Giulia Gatto-Monticone (second round)
15. (Switzerland) Conny Perrin (third round)
16. (Spain) Guiomar Maristany (second round)

== Draw ==
Key

- Q = Qualifier
- WC = Wild card
- LL = Lucky loser
- Alt = Alternate
- ITF = ITF entry
- PR = Protected ranking
- SR = Special ranking
- SE = Special exempt
- JE = Junior exempt
- JR = Junior Accelerator Programme entrant
- CO = College Accelerator Programme entrant
- NG = Next Gen Accelerator Program entrant
- w/o = Walkover
- r = Retired
- d = Defaulted

=== Finals ===
Quarterfinals
(Burundi) Sada Nahimana	7^{7}	6
(Romania) Miriam Bulgaru	6^{4}	4
3	(Czech Republic) Sára Bejlek	6	6
9	(Japan) Kurumi Nara	3	2
11	(North Macedonia) Lina Gjorcheska	6	6
4	(United States) Emma Navarro	4	2
12	Darya Astakhova	6	6
2	(Poland) Maja Chwalińska	4	3

Semifinals
(Burundi) Sada Nahimana	3	2
3	(Czech Republic) Sára Bejlek	6	6
11	(North Macedonia) Lina Gjorcheska	6	3	6
12	Darya Astakhova	2	6	3

Final
3	(Czech Republic) Sára Bejlek	6	7^{7}
11	(North Macedonia) Lina Gjorcheska	2	6^{0}

=== Top half ===
==== Section 1 ====
First round
(Czech Republic) T Smitková	1	4
(Burundi) S Nahimana	6	6
Q	(Germany) T Morderger	3	2
(Romania) IG Ghioroaie	6	6
Q	(France) V Muntean	1	2
(Slovenia) N Radišić	6	6
(Romania) M Bulgaru	6	5	6
(Georgia (country)) S Shapatava	2	7	4

Second round
1	(France) K Mladenovic	3	5
(Burundi) S Nahimana	6	7
(Romania) IG Ghioroaie	6	6
13	(Slovenia) D Jakupović	2	2
10	(Romania) C Dinu	5	7	0
(Slovenia) N Radišić	7	5	6
(Romania) M Bulgaru	3	6	6
8	(Bulgaria) I Shinikova	6	1	2

Third round
(Burundi) S Nahimana	6	6
(Romania) IG Ghioroaie	1	3
(Slovenia) N Radišić	6^{2}	5
(Romania) M Bulgaru	7^{7}	7

Quarterfinals
(Burundi) S Nahimana	7^{7}	6
(Romania) M Bulgaru	6^{4}	4

==== Section 2 ====
First round
(Poland) W Falkowska	4	0
Q	(Turkey) Ç Büyükakçay	6	6
Q	(Slovakia) E Méri	6	3	6
Q	(Austria) M Klaffner	0	6	2
(Czech Republic) D Šalková	2	2
V Kan	6	6
(France) S Cakarevic	4	3
(Czech Republic) B Palicová	6	6

Second round
3	(Czech Republic) S Bejlek	4	6	6
Q	(Turkey) Ç Büyükakçay	6	1	1
Q	(Slovakia) E Méri	7	6^{4}	6
16	(Spain) G Maristany	5	7^{7}	4
9	(Japan) K Nara	6	6
V Kan	4	3
(Czech Republic) B Palicová	5	6^{3}
6	(Croatia) T Lukas	7	7^{7}

Third round
3	(Czech Republic) S Bejlek	6	6
Q	(Slovakia) E Méri	2	1
9	(Japan) K Nara	7^{7}	6
6	(Croatia) T Lukas	6^{4}	4

Quarterfinals
3	(Czech Republic) S Bejlek	6	6
9	(Japan) K Nara	3	2

=== Bottom half ===
==== Section 3 ====
First round
(Germany) Y Morderger	6	7^{8}
WC	(Czech Republic) L Klimovičová	4	6^{6}
Q	(Germany) J Middendorf	3	0^{r}
Q	(Czech Republic) G Knutson	6	0
Q	(Switzerland) B Klincov	6	0
(Czech Republic) M Kolodziejová	2	0^{r}
WC	(Czech Republic) L Petruželová	2	0
(Serbia) I Jorović	6	6

Second round
5	(Spain) A Bolsova	6	6^{7}	7
(Germany) Y Morderger	3	7^{9}	5
Q	(Czech Republic) G Knutson	2	2
11	(North Macedonia) L Gjorcheska	6	6
15	(Switzerland) C Perrin	1	6	6
Q	(Switzerland) B Klincov	6	3	0
(Serbia) I Jorović
4	(United States) E Navarro	w/o

Third round
5	(Spain) A Bolsova	2	4
11	(North Macedonia) L Gjorcheska	6	6
15	(Switzerland) C Perrin	4	6	2
4	(United States) E Navarro	6	4	6

Quarterfinals
11	(North Macedonia) L Gjorcheska	6	6
4	(United States) E Navarro	4	2

==== Section 4 ====
First round
(Czech Republic) M Bayerlová	6	6
PR	(Germany) A Lottner	1	2
(Czech Republic) J Marková	0	2
(Romania) OG Simion	6	6
WC	(Czech Republic) J Štruplová	2	5
(Germany) L Papadakis	6	7
WC	(Czech Republic) N Augustinová	2	2
WC	(Czech Republic) D Viďmanová	6	6

Second round
7	(Slovakia) R Šramková	5	6^{5}
(Czech Republic) M Bayerlová	7	7^{7}
(Romania) OG Simion	3	6	2
12	D Astakhova	6	2	6
14	(Italy) G Gatto-Monticone	6^{3}	5
(Germany) L Papadakis	7^{7}	7
WC	(Czech Republic) D Viďmanová	7	0	4
2	(Poland) M Chwalińska	5	6	6

Third round
(Czech Republic) M Bayerlová	4	3
12	D Astakhova	6	6
(Germany) L Papadakis	5	1
2	(Poland) M Chwalińska	7	6

Quarterfinals
12	D Astakhova	6	6
2	(Poland) M Chwalińska	4	3
