= 2016 ITS Cup =

- Date: 11–17 July
- Edition: 8th
- Category: ITF Women's Circuit
- Prize money: $50,000
- Surface: Clay
- Location: Olomouc, Czech Republic

Champions

Singles
- (Russia) Elizaveta Kulichkova

Doubles
- (Bosnia and Herzegovina) Ema Burgić Bucko / (Bosnia and Herzegovina) Jasmina Tinjić
- ITS Cup

The 2016 ITS Cup was a professional tennis tournament played on outdoor clay courts. It was the eighth edition of the tournament and part of the 2016 ITF Women's Circuit, offering a total of $50,000 in prize money. It took place in Olomouc, Czech Republic, on 11–17 July 2016.

== Singles main draw entrants ==
=== Seeds ===
Country	Player	Rank^{1}	Seed
RUS	Elizaveta Kulichkova	117	1
CZE	Petra Cetkovská	138	2
FRA	Myrtille Georges	179	3
RUS	Ekaterina Alexandrova	223	4
CZE	Tereza Smitková	224	5
CZE	Karolína Muchová	229	6
CRO	Tena Lukas	267	7
POL	Katarzyna Kawa	299	8

- ^{1} Rankings as of 27 June 2016.

=== Other entrants ===
The following player received a wildcard into the singles main draw:

- (Russia) Ekaterina Makarova
- (Czech Republic) Barbora Miklová
- (Czech Republic) Gabriela Pantůčková
- (Czech Republic) Anna Sisková

The following players received entry from the qualifying draw:

- (Hungary) Ágnes Bukta
- (Czech Republic) Pernilla Mendesová
- (Austria) Lisa-Maria Moser
- (Czech Republic) Vendula Žovincová

== Champions ==
=== Singles ===
- (Russia) Elizaveta Kulichkova def. (Russia) Ekaterina Alexandrova, 4–6, 6–2, 6–1

=== Doubles ===
- (Bosnia and Herzegovina) Ema Burgić Bucko / (Bosnia and Herzegovina) Jasmina Tinjić def. (Philippines) Katharina Lehnert / (Ukraine) Anastasiya Shoshyna, 7–5, 6–3
