= 2015 ITS Cup =

- Date: 13–19 July
- Edition: 7th
- Category: ITF Women's Circuit
- Prize money: $50,000
- Surface: Clay
- Location: Olomouc, Czech Republic

Champions

Singles
- (Czech Republic) Barbora Krejčíková

Doubles
- (Czech Republic) Lenka Kunčíková / (Czech Republic) Karolína Stuchlá
- ITS Cup

The 2015 ITS Cup was a professional tennis tournament played on outdoor clay courts. It was the seventh edition of the tournament and part of the 2015 ITF Women's Circuit, offering a total of $50,000 in prize money. It took place in Olomouc, Czech Republic, on 13–19 June 2015.

== Singles main draw entrants ==
=== Seeds ===
Country	Player	Rank^{1}	Seed
CZE	Barbora Krejčíková	141	1
LAT	Jeļena Ostapenko	147	2
CZE	Petra Cetkovská	162	3
BUL	Elitsa Kostova	179	4
NED	Cindy Burger	189	5
UZB	Akgul Amanmuradova	218	6
CZE	Kateřina Vaňková	235	7
CRO	Jana Fett	257	8

- ^{1} Rankings as of 29 June 2015

=== Other entrants ===
The following players received wildcards into the singles main draw:

- (Czech Republic) Jesika Malečková
- (Czech Republic) Tereza Malíková
- (Czech Republic) Petra Rohanová
- (Slovakia) Lenka Wienerová

The following players received entry from the qualifying draw:

- (Czech Republic) Lenka Kunčíková
- (Czech Republic) Karolína Muchová
- (Slovakia) Petra Uberalová
- (Czech Republic) Zuzana Zálabská

The following player received entry by a lucky loser spot:

- (Croatia) Adrijana Lekaj

== Champions ==
=== Singles ===
- (Czech Republic) Barbora Krejčíková def. (Czech Republic) Petra Cetkovská, 3–6, 6–4, 7–6^{(7–5)}

=== Doubles ===
- (Czech Republic) Lenka Kunčíková / (Czech Republic) Karolína Stuchlá def. (Netherlands) Cindy Burger / (Czech Republic) Kateřina Vaňková, 1–6, 6–4, [12–10]
