= 2017 ITS Cup =

- Date: 17–23 July
- Edition: 9th
- Category: ITF Women's Circuit
- Prize money: $80,000+H
- Surface: Clay
- Location: Olomouc, Czech Republic

Champions

Singles
- (United States) Bernarda Pera

Doubles
- (France) Amandine Hesse / (Mexico) Victoria Rodríguez
- ITS Cup

The 2017 ITS Cup was a professional tennis tournament played on outdoor clay courts. It was the ninth edition of the tournament and was part of the 2017 ITF Women's Circuit. It took place in Olomouc, Czech Republic, on 17–23 July 2017.

== Singles main draw entrants ==
=== Seeds ===
Country	Player	Rank^{1}	Seed
CZE	Kristýna Plíšková	44	1
NED	Richèl Hogenkamp	104	2
CZE	Denisa Allertová	107	3
SLO	Dalila Jakupović	138	4
CZE	Lucie Hradecká	156	5
SWE	Rebecca Peterson	173	6
FRA	Amandine Hesse	184	7
SVK	Anna Karolína Schmiedlová	186	8

- ^{1} Rankings as of 3 July 2017.

=== Other entrants ===
The following players received a wildcard into the singles main draw:

- (Belgium) Marie Benoît
- (Czech Republic) Miriam Kolodziejová
- (Russia) Anastasia Pribylova
- (Czech Republic) Anna Sisková

The following player received entry by a special exempt:

- (Czech Republic) Anastasia Zarycká

The following players received entry from the qualifying draw:

- (Slovenia) Nina Potočnik
- (United States) Sabrina Santamaria
- (Romania) Raluca Georgiana Șerban
- (Czech Republic) Vendula Žovincová

== Champions ==
=== Singles ===
- (United States) Bernarda Pera def. (Czech Republic) Kristýna Plíšková, 7–5, 4–6, 6–3

=== Doubles ===
- (France) Amandine Hesse / (Mexico) Victoria Rodríguez def. (Slovakia) Michaela Hončová / (Romania) Raluca Georgiana Șerban, 3–6, 6–2, [10–6]
