= 2014 ITS Cup – Singles =

Singles
- 2014 ITS Cup

Final
- Champion: (Czech Republic) Petra Cetkovská
- Runner-up: (Czech Republic) Denisa Allertová
- Score: 3–6, 6–1, 6–4

Events
Singles	Doubles
← 2013 ·	ITS Cup	· 2015 →

Polona Hercog was the defending champion, but chose to participate at the Swedish Open instead. Petra Cetkovská won the all-Czech final, defeating Denisa Allertová 3–6, 6–1, 6–4.

== Seeds ==
1. (Czech Republic) Petra Cetkovská (champion)
2. (Czech Republic) Andrea Hlaváčková (second round)
3. (Ukraine) Anastasiya Vasylyeva (first round)
4. (Serbia) Aleksandra Krunić (second round)
5. (Ukraine) Lesia Tsurenko (quarterfinals)
6. (Czech Republic) Renata Voráčová (quarterfinals)
7. (Italy) Alberta Brianti (quarterfinals)
8. (Spain) Beatriz García Vidagany (first round)

== Main draw ==
=== Key ===
- Q = Qualifier
- WC = Wild card
- LL = Lucky loser
- Alt = Alternate
- SE = Special exempt
- PR = Protected ranking
- ITF = ITF entry
- JE = Junior exempt
- w/o = Walkover
- r = Retired
- d = Defaulted
- SR = Special ranking

=== Finals ===
Semifinals
1	(Czech Republic) Petra Cetkovská	6	6
WC	(Czech Republic) Barbora Krejčíková	4	2
Q	(Switzerland) Lara Michel	2	2
(Czech Republic) Denisa Allertová	6	6

Final
1	(Czech Republic) Petra Cetkovská	3	6	6
(Czech Republic) Denisa Allertová	6	1	4

=== Top half ===
First round
1	(Czech Republic) P Cetkovská	6	6
Q	(Czech Republic) Z Zálabská	1	0
(France) A Hesse	7^{7}	6
(United States) J Cohen	6^{5}	4
WC	(Germany) C Übelhör	3	4
(Romania) C Dinu	6	6
(Georgia (country)) S Shapatava	6	7^{8}
8	(Spain) B García Vidagany	4	6^{6}
4	(Serbia) A Krunić	6	6^{5}	6
WC	(Czech Republic) B Štefková	1	7^{7}	2
WC	(Czech Republic) B Krejčíková	6	6
(Germany) K Barrois	2	2
Q	(Czech Republic) M Borecká	2	4
(Austria) L-M Moser	6	6
(Russia) M Melnikova	6^{5}	2
6	(Czech Republic) R Voráčová	7^{7}	6

Second round
1	(Czech Republic) P Cetkovská	7^{7}	6
(France) A Hesse	6^{4}	4
(Romania) C Dinu	0	2
(Georgia (country)) S Shapatava	6	6
4	(Serbia) A Krunić	4	4
WC	(Czech Republic) B Krejčíková	6	6
(Austria) L-M Moser	4	2
6	(Czech Republic) R Voráčová	6	6

Quarterfinals
1	(Czech Republic) P Cetkovská	6	6
(Georgia (country)) S Shapatava	1	4
WC	(Czech Republic) B Krejčíková	7	6
6	(Czech Republic) R Voráčová	5	3

Semifinals
1	(Czech Republic) P Cetkovská	6	6
WC	(Czech Republic) B Krejčíková	4	2

=== Bottom half ===
First round
7	(Italy) A Brianti	7^{7}	6
LL	(Belarus) L Marozava	6^{1}	3
(Russia) E Alexandrova	1	6	6
(Venezuela) A Gámiz	6	4	0
Q	(Czech Republic) P Krejsová	6	6
(Italy) A Grymalska	4	4
Q	(Switzerland) L Michel	6	6
3	(Ukraine) A Vasylyeva	2	3
5	(Ukraine) L Tsurenko	7	6
WC	(Russia) M Marfutina	5	2
(Hungary) Á Bukta	6	3	6
(Russia) P Vinogradova	4	6	3
(Czech Republic) D Allertová	6	6
(France) M Georges	4	2
(Italy) G Gatto-Monticone	5	3
2	(Czech Republic) A Hlaváčková	7	6

Second round
7	(Italy) A Brianti	6	6
(Russia) E Alexandrova	2	4
Q	(Czech Republic) P Krejsová	6	2	6^{2}
Q	(Switzerland) L Michel	4	6	7^{7}
5	(Ukraine) L Tsurenko	6	7
(Hungary) Á Bukta	4	5
(Czech Republic) D Allertová	6	6
2	(Czech Republic) A Hlaváčková	3	2

Quarterfinals
7	(Italy) A Brianti	2	2
Q	(Switzerland) L Michel	6	6
5	(Ukraine) L Tsurenko	3	7	2
(Czech Republic) D Allertová	6	5	6

Semifinals
Q	(Switzerland) L Michel	2	2
(Czech Republic) D Allertová	6	6
