= 2014 ITS Cup – Doubles =

Doubles
- 2014 ITS Cup

Final
- Champions: (Czech Republic) Petra Cetkovská (Czech Republic) Renata Voráčová
- Runners-up: (Czech Republic) Barbora Krejčíková (Serbia) Aleksandra Krunić
- Score: 6–2, 4–6, [10–7]

Events
Singles	Doubles
← 2013 ·	ITS Cup	· 2015 →

Renata Voráčová and Barbora Záhlavová-Strýcová were the defending champions, but Záhlavová-Strýcová chose not to participate. Voráčová teamed up with Petra Cetkovská and successfully defended her title, defeating Barbora Krejčíková and Aleksandra Krunić in the final, 6–2, 4–6, [10–7].

== Seeds ==
1. (Czech Republic) Petra Cetkovská / (Czech Republic) Renata Voráčová (champions)
2. (Georgia (country)) Sofia Shapatava / (Ukraine) Anastasiya Vasylyeva (first round)
3. (Czech Republic) Barbora Krejčíková / (Serbia) Aleksandra Krunić (final)
4. (Venezuela) Andrea Gámiz / (Spain) Beatriz García Vidagany (first round)

== Draw ==
=== Key ===
- Q = Qualifier
- WC = Wild card
- LL = Lucky loser
- Alt = Alternate
- SE = Special exempt
- PR = Protected ranking
- ITF = ITF entry
- JE = Junior exempt
- w/o = Walkover
- r = Retired
- d = Defaulted
- SR = Special ranking

First round
1	(Czech Republic) P Cetkovská (Czech Republic) R Voráčová	4	7^{7}	[10]
Alt	(Croatia) A Lekaj (Russia) A Tarasova	6	6^{3}	[5]
' (Czech Republic) M Borecká (Czech Republic) P Krejsová	7^{7}	6
(Turkey) H Esen (Turkey) L Esen	6^{5}	3
4	(Venezuela) A Gámiz (Spain) B García Vidagany	0	5
(Belarus) L Marozava (Russia) M Melnikova	6	7
(Italy) G Gatto-Monticone (Italy) A Grymalska	6^{2}	4
(Czech Republic) L Kunčíková (Czech Republic) K Stuchlá	7^{7}	6
WC	(Czech Republic) M Kubičíková (Germany) C Übelhör	3	1
(Czech Republic) T Malíková (Russia) M Marfutina	6	6
WC	(Russia) L Avanesyan (Czech Republic) B Štefková	1	1
3	(Czech Republic) B Krejčíková (Serbia) A Krunić	6	6
(Czech Republic) H Birnerová (United States) J Cohen	6	7
WC	(Slovakia) B Kollárová (Switzerland) L Michel	3	5
(Czech Republic) K Kramperová (Slovakia) C Škamlová	7^{7}	6
2	(Georgia (country)) S Shapatava (Ukraine) A Vasylyeva	6^{3}	2

Quarterfinals
1	(Czech Republic) P Cetkovská (Czech Republic) R Voráčová	7^{10}	6
(Czech Republic) M Borecká (Czech Republic) P Krejsová	6^{8}	3
(Belarus) L Marozava (Russia) M Melnikova	7^{7}	6
(Czech Republic) L Kunčíková (Czech Republic) K Stuchlá	6^{3}	2
(Czech Republic) T Malíková (Russia) M Marfutina	4	2
3	(Czech Republic) B Krejčíková (Serbia) A Krunić	6	6
(Czech Republic) H Birnerová (United States) J Cohen	6^{1}	4
(Czech Republic) K Kramperová (Slovakia) C Škamlová	7^{7}	6

Semifinals
1	(Czech Republic) P Cetkovská (Czech Republic) R Voráčová	6	6
(Belarus) L Marozava (Russia) M Melnikova	1	3
3	(Czech Republic) B Krejčíková (Serbia) A Krunić	6	6^{3}	[10]
(Czech Republic) K Kramperová (Slovakia) C Škamlová	4	7^{7}	[4]

Final
1	(Czech Republic) P Cetkovská (Czech Republic) R Voráčová	6	4	[10]
3	(Czech Republic) B Krejčíková (Serbia) A Krunić	2	6	[7]
