= 2017 ITS Cup – Singles =

Singles
- 2017 ITS Cup

Final
- Champion: (United States) Bernarda Pera
- Runner-up: (Czech Republic) Kristýna Plíšková
- Score: 7–5, 4–6, 6–3

Events
Singles	Doubles
← 2016 ·	ITS Cup	· 2018 →

Elizaveta Kulichkova was the defending champion, but chose not to participate.

Bernarda Pera won the title, defeating Kristýna Plíšková in the final, 7–5, 4–6, 6–3.

== Seeds ==
1. (Czech Republic) Kristýna Plíšková (final)
2. (Netherlands) Richèl Hogenkamp (quarterfinals)
3. (Czech Republic) Denisa Allertová (semifinals)
4. (Slovenia) Dalila Jakupović (first round)
5. (Czech Republic) Lucie Hradecká (quarterfinals)
6. (Sweden) Rebecca Peterson (quarterfinals)
7. (France) Amandine Hesse (second round)
8. (Slovakia) Anna Karolína Schmiedlová (second round)

== Draw ==
=== Key ===
- Q = Qualifier
- WC = Wild card
- LL = Lucky loser
- Alt = Alternate
- SE = Special exempt
- PR = Protected ranking
- ITF = ITF entry
- JE = Junior exempt
- w/o = Walkover
- r = Retired
- d = Defaulted
- SR = Special ranking

=== Finals ===
Semifinals
1	(Czech Republic) Kristýna Plíšková	5	6	6
3	(Czech Republic) Denisa Allertová	7	4	1
(Slovakia) Michaela Hončová	4	6	1
(United States) Bernarda Pera	6	2	6

Final
1	(Czech Republic) Kristýna Plíšková	5	6	3
(United States) Bernarda Pera	7	4	6

=== Top half ===
First round
1	(Czech Republic) Kr Plíšková	7^{7}	6
Q	(United States) S Santamaria	6^{3}	1
(Italy) G Gatto-Monticone	6	4	4
(Czech Republic) K Muchová	3	6	6
(Czech Republic) G Pantůčková	6^{3}	3
WC	(Russia) Ana Pribylova	7^{7}	6
Q	(Czech Republic) V Žovincová	0	2
6	(Sweden) R Peterson	6	6
3	(Czech Republic) D Allertová	6	6
Q	(Romania) RG Șerban	1	1
(Poland) K Kawa	5	3
(Russia) A Morgina	7	6
SE	(Czech Republic) A Zarycká	6	3
(Russia) V Kamenskaya	4	1^{r}
WC	(Czech Republic) A Sisková	2	1
5	(Czech Republic) L Hradecká	6	6

Second round
1	(Czech Republic) Kr Plíšková	6	5	7
(Czech Republic) K Muchová	4	7	5
WC	(Russia) Ana Pribylova	0	3
6	(Sweden) R Peterson	6	6
3	(Czech Republic) D Allertová	7	3	6
(Russia) A Morgina	5	6	3
SE	(Czech Republic) A Zarycká	6^{6}	6	5
5	(Czech Republic) L Hradecká	7^{8}	2	7

Quarterfinals
1	(Czech Republic) Kr Plíšková	6	7^{7}
6	(Sweden) R Peterson	4	6^{4}
3	(Czech Republic) D Allertová	6	6
5	(Czech Republic) L Hradecká	3	4

Semifinals
1	(Czech Republic) Kr Plíšková	5	6	6
3	(Czech Republic) D Allertová	7	4	1

=== Bottom half ===
First round
8	(Slovakia) AK Schmiedlová	6	4
(Spain) MT Torró Flor	2	0^{r}
Q	(Slovenia) N Potočnik	3	7	6^{4}
(Czech Republic) J Malečková	6	5	7^{7}
(Slovakia) M Hončová	7^{7}	6^{4}	6
WC	(Czech Republic) M Kolodziejová	6^{4}	7^{7}	2
(Italy) J Pieri	7^{7}	6
4	(Slovenia) D Jakupović	6^{4}	3
7	(France) A Hesse	6	6
(Norway) U Eikeri	2	1
(United States) B Pera	6	6
WC	(Belgium) M Benoît	1	2
(Germany) L Schaeder	5	6	6
(Norway) M Stokke	7	2	2
(Mexico) V Rodríguez	6^{5}	2
2	(Netherlands) R Hogenkamp	7^{7}	6

Second round
8	(Slovakia) AK Schmiedlová	4	7	3
(Czech Republic) J Malečková	6	5	6
(Slovakia) M Hončová	4	6	6
(Italy) J Pieri	6	1	3
7	(France) A Hesse	2	2
(United States) B Pera	6	6
(Germany) L Schaeder	4	3
2	(Netherlands) R Hogenkamp	6	6

Quarterfinals
(Czech Republic) J Malečková	6^{5}	3
(Slovakia) M Hončová	7^{7}	6
(United States) B Pera	7	6
2	(Netherlands) R Hogenkamp	5	2

Semifinals
(Slovakia) M Hončová	4	6	1
(United States) B Pera	6	2	6
