= 2013 ITS Cup =

- Date: 15–21 July
- Edition: 5th
- Draw: 32S / 16D
- Prize money: $100,000
- Surface: Clay
- Location: Olomouc, Czech Republic

Champions

Singles
- (Slovenia) Polona Hercog

Doubles
- (Czech Republic) Renata Voráčová / (Czech Republic) Barbora Záhlavová-Strýcová
- ITS Cup

The 2013 ITS Cup was a professional tennis tournament played on outdoor clay courts. It was the fifth edition of the tournament which was part of the 2013 ITF Women's Circuit, offering a total of $100,000 in prize money. It took place in Olomouc, Czech Republic, on 15–21 July 2013.

== WTA entrants ==
=== Seeds ===
Country	Player	Rank^{1}	Seed
SLO	Polona Hercog	87	1
CZE	Barbora Záhlavová-Strýcová	96	2
CZE	Eva Birnerová	104	3
FRA	Pauline Parmentier	120	4
UKR	Maryna Zanevska	131	5
ITA	Nastassja Burnett	156	6
UKR	Nadiya Kichenok	169	7
ROU	Andreea Mitu	174	8

- ^{1} Rankings as of 8 July 2013

=== Other entrants ===
The following players received wildcards into the singles main draw:

- (Czech Republic) Jesika Malečková
- (Czech Republic) Karolína Novotná
- (Czech Republic) Gabriela Pantůčková
- (Czech Republic) Barbora Štefková

The following players received entry from the qualifying draw:

- (Czech Republic) Tereza Malíková
- (Czech Republic) Pernilla Mendesová
- (Czech Republic) Petra Rohanová
- (Czech Republic) Zuzana Zálabská

== Champions ==
=== Women's singles ===
- (Slovenia) Polona Hercog def. (Poland) Katarzyna Piter 6–0, 6–3

=== Women's doubles ===
- (Czech Republic) Renata Voráčová / (Czech Republic) Barbora Záhlavová-Strýcová def. (Czech Republic) Martina Borecká / (Czech Republic) Tereza Malíková 6–3, 6–4
