= 2014 ITS Cup =

- Date: 14–20 July
- Edition: 6th
- Category: ITF Women's Circuit
- Prize money: $50,000
- Surface: Clay
- Location: Olomouc, Czech Republic

Champions

Singles
- (Czech Republic) Petra Cetkovská

Doubles
- (Czech Republic) Petra Cetkovská / (Czech Republic) Renata Voráčová
- ITS Cup

The 2014 ITS Cup was a professional tennis tournament played on outdoor clay courts. It was the sixth edition of the tournament which was part of the 2014 ITF Women's Circuit, offering a total of $50,000 in prize money. It took place in Olomouc, Czech Republic, on 14–20 July 2014.

== Singles main draw entrants ==
=== Seeds ===
Country	Player	Rank^{1}	Seed
CZE	Petra Cetkovská	78	1
CZE	Andrea Hlaváčková	116	2
UKR	Anastasiya Vasylyeva	143	3
SRB	Aleksandra Krunić	155	4
UKR	Lesia Tsurenko	170	5
CZE	Renata Voráčová	184	6
ITA	Alberta Brianti	185	7
ESP	Beatriz García Vidagany	186	8

- ^{1} Rankings as of 7 July 2014

=== Other entrants ===
The following players received wildcards into the singles main draw:

- (Czech Republic) Barbora Krejčíková
- (Russia) Maria Marfutina
- (Czech Republic) Barbora Štefková
- (Germany) Caroline Übelhör

The following players received entry from the qualifying draw:

- (Czech Republic) Martina Borecká
- (Czech Republic) Petra Krejsová
- (Switzerland) Lara Michel
- (Czech Republic) Zuzana Zálabská

The following player received entry into the singles main draw as a lucky loser:

- (Belarus) Lidziya Marozava

== Champions ==
=== Singles ===
- (Czech Republic) Petra Cetkovská def. (Czech Republic) Denisa Allertová 3–6, 6–1, 6–4

=== Doubles ===
- (Czech Republic) Petra Cetkovská / (Czech Republic) Renata Voráčová def. (Czech Republic) Barbora Krejčíková / (Serbia) Aleksandra Krunić 6–2, 4–6, [10–7]
