= 2015 ITS Cup – Singles =

Singles
- 2015 ITS Cup

Final
- Champion: (Czech Republic) Barbora Krejčíková
- Runner-up: (Czech Republic) Petra Cetkovská
- Score: 3–6, 6–4, 7–6^{(7–5)}

Events
Singles	Doubles
← 2014 ·	ITS Cup	· 2016 →

Petra Cetkovská was the defending champion, but lost in the all-Czech final to the top seed Barbora Krejčíková, 3–6, 6–4, 7–6^{(7–5)}.

== Seeds ==
1. (Czech Republic) Barbora Krejčíková (champion)
2. (Latvia) Jeļena Ostapenko (first round; retired)
3. (Czech Republic) Petra Cetkovská (final)
4. (Bulgaria) Elitsa Kostova (first round)
5. (Netherlands) Cindy Burger (second round)
6. (Uzbekistan) Akgul Amanmuradova (quarterfinals)
7. (Czech Republic) Katerina Vaňková (second round)
8. (Croatia) Jana Fett (first round)

== Main draw ==
=== Key ===
- Q = Qualifier
- WC = Wild card
- LL = Lucky loser
- Alt = Alternate
- SE = Special exempt
- PR = Protected ranking
- ITF = ITF entry
- JE = Junior exempt
- w/o = Walkover
- r = Retired
- d = Defaulted
- SR = Special ranking

=== Finals ===
Semifinals
1	(Czech Republic) Barbora Krejčíková	3	7^{7}	6
(Czech Republic) Pernilla Mendesová	6	6^{4}	3
3	(Czech Republic) Petra Cetkovská	2	7^{7}	7
(Russia) Ekaterina Alexandrova	6	6^{5}	5

Final
1	(Czech Republic) Barbora Krejčíková	3	6	7^{7}
3	(Czech Republic) Petra Cetkovská	6	4	6^{5}

=== Top half ===
First round
1	(Czech Republic) B Krejčíková	6	6
(Austria) P König	3	1
(Italy) G Gatto-Monticone	6	7^{7}
Q	(Czech Republic) L Kunčíková	2	6^{2}
(Czech Republic) M Borecká	3	3
(Ukraine) E Ianchuk	6	6
LL	(Croatia) A Lekaj	1	5
5	(Netherlands) C Burger	6	7
4	(Bulgaria) E Kostova	2	1
(Czech Republic) P Mendesová	6	6
WC	(Czech Republic) P Rohanová	1	2
(France) M Georges	6	6
Q	(Czech Republic) K Muchová	4	6	6
(Ukraine) O Ianchuk	6	2	4
(Czech Republic) G Pantůčková	7^{7}	4	6
8	(Croatia) J Fett	6^{5}	6	4

Second round
1	(Czech Republic) B Krejčíková	6	6
(Italy) G Gatto-Monticone	1	3
(Ukraine) E Ianchuk	7^{7}	6
5	(Netherlands) C Burger	6^{5}	2
(Czech Republic) P Mendesová	6	4	6
(France) M Georges	3	6	3
Q	(Czech Republic) K Muchová	6	7
(Czech Republic) G Pantůčková	3	5

Quarterfinals
1	(Czech Republic) B Krejčíková	6	7^{9}
(Ukraine) E Ianchuk	2	6^{7}
(Czech Republic) P Mendesová	6	6
Q	(Czech Republic) K Muchová	4	4

Semifinals
1	(Czech Republic) B Krejčíková	3	7^{7}	6
(Czech Republic) P Mendesová	6	6^{4}	3

=== Bottom half ===
First round
6	(Uzbekistan) A Amanmuradova	6	6
WC	(Slovakia) L Wienerová	3	4
WC	(Czech Republic) J Malečková	6	6
(France) C Paquet	4	0
WC	(Czech Republic) T Malíková	3	3
(France) I Ramialison	6	6
(Slovakia) R Šramková	6	4	2
3	(Czech Republic) P Cetkovská	4	6	6
7	(Czech Republic) K Vaňková	6	6
Q	(Czech Republic) Z Zálabská	2	2
(Croatia) E Mikulčić	2	1
(Georgia (country)) S Shapatava	6	6
Q	(Slovakia) P Uberalová	3	3
(Czech Republic) B Štefková	6	6
(Russia) E Alexandrova	7	3
2	(Latvia) J Ostapenko	5	2^{r}

Second round
6	(Uzbekistan) A Amanmuradova	6	6
WC	(Czech Republic) J Malečková	3	4
(France) I Ramialison	4	6	5
3	(Czech Republic) P Cetkovská	6	1	7
7	(Czech Republic) K Vaňková	3	1
(Georgia (country)) S Shapatava	6	6
(Czech Republic) B Štefková	2	6	5
(Russia) E Alexandrova	6	2	7

Quarterfinals
6	(Uzbekistan) A Amanmuradova	6^{3}	0
3	(Czech Republic) P Cetkovská	7^{7}	6
(Georgia (country)) S Shapatava	7	0	1
(Russia) E Alexandrova	5	6	6

Semifinals
3	(Czech Republic) P Cetkovská	2	7^{7}	7
(Russia) E Alexandrova	6	6^{5}	5
