= 2013 ITS Cup – Doubles =

Doubles
- 2013 ITS Cup

Final
- Champions: (Czech Republic) Renata Voráčová (Czech Republic) Barbora Záhlavová-Strýcová
- Runners-up: (Czech Republic) Martina Borecká (Czech Republic) Tereza Malíková
- Score: 6–3, 6–4

Events
Singles	Doubles
← 2012 ·	ITS Cup	· 2014 →

Inés Ferrer Suárez and Richèl Hogenkamp were the defending champions, having won the event in 2012, but both players chose not to defend their title.

Renata Voráčová and Barbora Záhlavová-Strýcová won the tournament, defeating Martina Borecká and Tereza Malíková in the all-Czech final, 6–3, 6–4.

== Seeds ==
1. (Czech Republic) Renata Voráčová / (Czech Republic) Barbora Záhlavová-Strýcová (champions)
2. (Czech Republic) Eva Birnerová / (Hungary) Réka-Luca Jani (semifinals)
3. (Poland) Katarzyna Piter / (Croatia) Ana Vrljić (semifinals)
4. (Ukraine) Nadiya Kichenok / (Ukraine) Maryna Zanevska (first round)

== Draw ==
=== Key ===
- Q = Qualifier
- WC = Wild card
- LL = Lucky loser
- Alt = Alternate
- SE = Special exempt
- PR = Protected ranking
- ITF = ITF entry
- JE = Junior exempt
- w/o = Walkover
- r = Retired
- d = Defaulted
- SR = Special ranking

First round
1	(Czech Republic) R Voráčová (Czech Republic) B Záhlavová-Strýcová	6	3	[10]
(Croatia) A Lekaj (Russia) A Tarasova	4	6	[6]
(Czech Republic) L Kunčíková (Czech Republic) J Malečková	4	4
(Czech Republic) D Allertová (Czech Republic) P Mendesová	6	6
3	(Poland) K Piter (Croatia) A Vrljić	6	6
(Czech Republic) K Novotná (Czech Republic) K Sisková	1	1
(Belgium) M Boev (Czech Republic) N Fraňková	2	6	[10]
WC	(Russia) L Avanesyan (Czech Republic) B Štefková	6	4	[5]
(Czech Republic) M Borecká (Czech Republic) T Malíková	6	6
Q	(Russia) E Alexandrova (Czech Republic) P Rohanová	4	3
(Romania) C Dinu (Romania) A Mitu	7	0	[10]
4	(Ukraine) N Kichenok (Ukraine) M Zanevska	5	6	[8]
(Czech Republic) S Machalová (Czech Republic) K Vlachová	4	2
(Slovakia) K Kučová (Czech Republic) G Pantůčková	6	6
Q	(Czech Republic) D Hrabalová (Slovakia) B Kollárová	2	1
2	(Czech Republic) E Birnerová (Hungary) R-L Jani	6	6

Quarterfinals
1	(Czech Republic) R Voráčová (Czech Republic) B Záhlavová-Strýcová	6	6
(Czech Republic) D Allertová (Czech Republic) P Mendesová	4	3
3	(Poland) K Piter (Croatia) A Vrljić	6	6
(Belgium) M Boev (Czech Republic) N Fraňková	1	1
(Czech Republic) M Borecká (Czech Republic) T Malíková	6	6
(Romania) C Dinu (Romania) A Mitu	2	0
(Slovakia) K Kučová (Czech Republic) G Pantůčková	6	2	[7]
2	(Czech Republic) E Birnerová (Hungary) R-L Jani	4	6	[10]

Semifinals
1	(Czech Republic) R Voráčová (Czech Republic) B Záhlavová-Strýcová	6	6
3	(Poland) K Piter (Croatia) A Vrljić	2	2
(Czech Republic) M Borecká (Czech Republic) T Malíková	6	7
2	(Czech Republic) E Birnerová (Hungary) R-L Jani	3	5

Final
1	(Czech Republic) R Voráčová (Czech Republic) B Záhlavová-Strýcová	6	6
(Czech Republic) M Borecká (Czech Republic) T Malíková	3	4
