= Iveta Gerlová =

Czech tennis player (born 1984)

- Born: 14 June 1984 (age 41); Jihlava, Czechoslovakia

Iveta Gerlová (born 14 June 1984) is a Czech former professional tennis player.

Her coach is Lukáš Březina. She is a member of TK Spartak Jihlava tennis club. She took part in the best athlete survey organized by ČSTV Jihlava Regional Association.

== National career ==
She achieved successful results at the Rieter Cup held in Ústí nad Orlicí and became the Czech Republic champion in women's singles. She defeated Petra Kvitová in 2006. She defended her title by defeating Tereza Bekerová in 2007. In women's doubles, she played in the final with her partner Lucía Kriegsmannová.

In 2008, Gerlová played in the women's final for the third time in a row. She defeated Petra Krejsová in the final.This year, Gerlová won the Rieter Cup double title in both singles and doubles together with Lucia Kriegsmannová. She played in the final of the indoor championship held in 2009. Sandra Záhlavová was defeated. At the Rieter Cup in 2010, she defeated Tereza Hladíková in the final. In 2010, she played in the final of the Czech Women's Indoor Championships held in Milovice, Czech Republic, with her partner Kriegsmannová in women's doubles. She was defeated by Eva Birnerová and her sister Hana Birnerová in the final.

At the Rieter Cup in 2011, she was defeated by Zuzana Zálabská in the final.

== International career ==
In 2009, she achieved the third singles victory of her career in Warsaw, Poland. Poland in the final Defeated by Katarzyna Kawa. She won the doubles with her partner Karolina Kosińska. She played in the final of the international ITS Cup held in Olomouc, Czech Republic. Lucie Kriegsmannová was defeated in the final. In the doubles, with her partner Darina Šeděnková, Borecká defeated Kubičíková in the final and won the doubles.

In 2010, at the international tournament in Vienna, Austria, her partner Kriegsmannová defeated Zálabská/Šmídová in the women's doubles. They became champions in women's doubles at the tournament in Prague in August 2010. In 2010, they played in the final of the International ITS Cup held in Olomouc with their partner Kriegsmannová in women's doubles. In the final, She was defeated by Austrian Sandra Klemenschits and Patricia Mayr-Achleitner.

In 2011, the tournament held in Prague, Czech Republic, she defeated Slovak Jana Čepelová and Polish Katarzyna Piter in the final with her partner Lucie Kriegsmannová in the women's doubles.
