= 2016 ITS Cup – Doubles =

Doubles
- 2016 ITS Cup

Final
- Champions: (Bosnia and Herzegovina) Ema Burgić Bucko (Bosnia and Herzegovina) Jasmina Tinjić
- Runners-up: (Philippines) Katharina Lehnert (Ukraine) Anastasiya Shoshyna
- Score: 7–5, 6–3

Events
Singles	Doubles
← 2015 ·	ITS Cup	· 2017 →

Lenka Kunčíková and Karolína Stuchlá were the defending champions of the 2016 ITS Cup Doubles, but they chose to participate in Bucharest instead.

Ema Burgić Bucko and Jasmina Tinjić won the title, defeating Katharina Lehnert and Anastasiya Shoshyna in the final, 7–5, 6–3.

== Seeds ==
1. (Ukraine) Alona Fomina / (Ukraine) Anastasiya Vasylyeva (first round)
2. (Czech Republic) Kateřina Kramperová / (Sweden) Cornelia Lister (first round)
3. (Italy) Anastasia Grymalska / (Russia) Alena Tarasova (first round)
4. (Croatia) Tena Lukas / (Croatia) Silvia Njirić (quarterfinals)

== Draw ==
=== Key ===
- Q = Qualifier
- WC = Wild card
- LL = Lucky loser
- Alt = Alternate
- SE = Special exempt
- PR = Protected ranking
- ITF = ITF entry
- JE = Junior exempt
- w/o = Walkover
- r = Retired
- d = Defaulted
- SR = Special ranking

First round
1	(Ukraine) A Fomina (Ukraine) A Vasylyeva	5	3
(Poland) M Fręch (Czech Republic) P Mendesová	7	6
WC	(Czech Republic) N Břečková (Czech Republic) A Sisková	6	6
WC	(Russia) E Makarova (Czech Republic) E Rutarová	4	4
4	(Croatia) T Lukas (Croatia) S Njirić	6	6
(Czech Republic) K Hrabalová (Czech Republic) N Tomanová	4	4
(Czech Republic) S Machalová (Czech Republic) A Slováková	2	2
(Bosnia and Herzegovina) E Burgić Bucko (Bosnia and Herzegovina) J Tinjić	6	6
WC	(Czech Republic) N Cváčková (Czech Republic) B Miklová	2	6^{3}
(Philippines) K Lehnert (Ukraine) A Shoshyna	6	7^{7}
(Czech Republic) T Malíková (Czech Republic) K Muchová	4	7	[10]
3	(Italy) A Grymalska (Russia) A Tarasova	6	5	[7]
(Moldova) A Perper (Russia) A Pribylova	6	6
(Austria) P König (Czech Republic) D Šumová	4	2
(Hungary) Á Bukta (Slovakia) L Juríková	6	7^{10}
2	(Czech Republic) K Kramperová (Sweden) C Lister	4	6^{8}

Quarterfinals
(Poland) M Fręch (Czech Republic) P Mendesová	7^{9}	6
WC	(Czech Republic) N Břečková (Czech Republic) A Sisková	6^{7}	2
4	(Croatia) T Lukas (Croatia) S Njirić	7	4	[6]
(Bosnia and Herzegovina) E Burgić Bucko (Bosnia and Herzegovina) J Tinjić	5	6	[10]
(Philippines) K Lehnert (Ukraine) A Shoshyna	6	7^{7}
(Czech Republic) T Malíková (Czech Republic) K Muchová	0	6^{4}
(Moldova) A Perper (Russia) A Pribylova	4	1
(Hungary) Á Bukta (Slovakia) L Juríková	6	6

Semifinals
(Poland) M Fręch (Czech Republic) P Mendesová	4	2
(Bosnia and Herzegovina) E Burgić Bucko (Bosnia and Herzegovina) J Tinjić	6	6
(Philippines) K Lehnert (Ukraine) A Shoshyna	6	6
(Hungary) Á Bukta (Slovakia) L Juríková	4	2

Final
(Bosnia and Herzegovina) E Burgić Bucko (Bosnia and Herzegovina) J Tinjić	7	6
(Philippines) K Lehnert (Ukraine) A Shoshyna	5	3

== See also ==
- 2016 ITS Cup
