= 2024 ITS Cup – Singles =

Singles
- 2024 ITS Cup

Final
- Champion: (Hungary) Anna Bondár
- Runner-up: (South Korea) Jang Su-jeong
- Score: 6–3, 7–6^{(7–4)}

Events
Singles	Doubles
- ITS Cup

Darja Semeņistaja was the defending champion but chose not to participate.

Anna Bondár won the title, defeating Jang Su-jeong in the final, 6–3, 7–6^{(7–4)}.

== Seeds ==
1. (Hungary) Anna Bondár (champion)
2. (Hungary) Panna Udvardy (quarterfinals)
3. (Spain) Leyre Romero Gormaz (quarterfinals)
4. (China) You Xiaodi (first round)
5. Julia Avdeeva (second round)
6. (Poland) Maja Chwalińska (second round)
7. (Liechtenstein) Kathinka von Deichmann (quarterfinals)
8. (Spain) Guiomar Maristany (second round)

== Draw ==
Key

- Q = Qualifier
- WC = Wild card
- LL = Lucky loser
- Alt = Alternate
- ITF = ITF entry
- PR = Protected ranking
- SR = Special ranking
- SE = Special exempt
- JE = Junior exempt
- JR = Junior Accelerator Programme entrant
- CO = College Accelerator Programme entrant
- NG = Next Gen Accelerator Program entrant
- w/o = Walkover
- r = Retired
- d = Defaulted

=== Finals ===
Semifinals
1	(Hungary) Anna Bondár	4	6	6
Q	(Germany) Carolina Kuhl	6	3	1
WC	(Czech Republic) Julie Paštiková	6	2	0
(South Korea) Jang Su-jeong	4	6	6

Final
1	(Hungary) Anna Bondár	6	7^{7}
(South Korea) Jang Su-jeong	3	6^{4}

=== Top half ===
First round
1	(Hungary) A Bondár	6	6
(Serbia) L Radivojević	4	3
(Belgium) S Costoulas	7	6
(Latvia) D Marcinkēviča	5	2
WC	(Czech Republic) B Michálková	0	0
Q	(Turkey) Ç Büyükakçay	6	6
LL	(Japan) Y Naito	3	6^{5}
7	(Liechtenstein) K von Deichmann	6	7^{7}
4	(China) X You	3	1
Q	(Germany) C Kuhl	6	6
(Czech Republic) J Štruplová	1	2
Q	(Czech Republic) J Malečková	6	6
(Greece) V Grammatikopoulou	6	6
Q	A Anshba	1	2
Q	(Germany) L Schmidt	4	1
5	J Avdeeva	6	6

Second round
1	(Hungary) A Bondár	6	6
(Belgium) S Costoulas	2	4
Q	(Turkey) Ç Büyükakçay	3	5
7	(Liechtenstein) K von Deichmann	6	7
Q	(Germany) C Kuhl	7^{9}	3	6
Q	(Czech Republic) J Malečková	6^{7}	6	3
(Greece) V Grammatikopoulou	7^{7}	7^{7}
5	J Avdeeva	6^{5}	6^{3}

Quarterfinals
1	(Hungary) A Bondár	6	4	6
7	(Liechtenstein) K von Deichmann	3	6	4
Q	(Germany) C Kuhl	6	6
(Greece) V Grammatikopoulou	2	4

Semifinals
1	(Hungary) A Bondár	4	6	6
Q	(Germany) C Kuhl	6	3	1

=== Bottom half ===
First round
8	(Spain) G Maristany	6	6
WC	(Czech Republic) L Petruželová	1	2
(Czech Republic) B Palicová	4	5
WC	(Czech Republic) J Paštiková	6	7
(Greece) S Sakellaridi	6	5	0
(Hungary) F Stollár	3	7	6
Q	(Slovakia) M Okáľová	5	2
3	(Spain) L Romero Gormaz	7	6
6	(Poland) M Chwalińska	6	6
Q	(France) A Ramé	4	1
(South Korea) S-j Jang	6	6
(Romania) G Lee	1	3
Q	(Spain) A Geerlings	6	1
(Australia) K McPhee	3	1^{r}
WC	(Slovenia) N Radišić	4	5
2	(Hungary) P Udvardy	6	7

Second round
8	(Spain) G Maristany	7^{9}	1	3
WC	(Czech Republic) J Paštiková	6^{7}	6	6
(Hungary) F Stollár	4	2
3	(Spain) L Romero Gormaz	6	6
6	(Poland) M Chwalińska	3	1
(South Korea) S-j Jang	6	6
Q	(Spain) A Geerlings	6	3	4
2	(Hungary) P Udvardy	3	6	6

Quarterfinals
WC	(Czech Republic) J Paštiková	6	6
3	(Spain) L Romero Gormaz	1	1
(South Korea) S-j Jang	7	7^{7}
2	(Hungary) P Udvardy	5	6^{3}

Semifinals
WC	(Czech Republic) J Paštiková	6	2	0
(South Korea) S-j Jang	4	6	6
