= 2024 ITS Cup =

Tennis tournament

- Date: 17–23 June 2024
- Edition: 16th
- Category: ITF Women's World Tennis Tour
- Prize money: $60,000
- Surface: Clay / Outdoor
- Location: Olomouc, Czech Republic

Champions

Singles
- (Hungary) Anna Bondár

Doubles
- Amina Anshba / (Greece) Valentini Grammatikopoulou
- ITS Cup

The 2024 ITS Cup was a professional tennis tournament that was played on outdoor clay courts. It was the sixteenth edition of the tournament, which was part of the 2024 ITF Women's World Tennis Tour. It took place in Olomouc, Czech Republic, between 17 and 23 June 2024.

== Champions ==
=== Singles ===
- (Hungary) Anna Bondár def. (South Korea) Jang Su-jeong, 6–3, 7–6^{(7–4)}

=== Doubles ===
- Amina Anshba / (Greece) Valentini Grammatikopoulou def. (United States) Jessie Aney / (Germany) Lena Papadakis, 6–2, 6–4

== Singles main draw entrants ==
=== Seeds ===
Country	Player	Rank	Seed
HUN	Anna Bondár	108	1
HUN	Panna Udvardy	133	2
ESP	Leyre Romero Gormaz	185	3
CHN	You Xiaodi	200	4
	Julia Avdeeva	203	5
POL	Maja Chwalińska	247	6
LIE	Kathinka von Deichmann	248	7
ESP	Guiomar Maristany	250	8

- Rankings are as of 10 June 2024.

=== Other entrants ===
The following players received wildcards into the singles main draw:

- (Czech Republic) Barbora Michálková
- (Czech Republic) Julie Paštiková
- (Czech Republic) Lucie Petruželová
- (Slovenia) Nika Radišić

The following players received entry from the qualifying draw:

- Amina Anshba
- (Turkey) Çağla Büyükakçay
- (Spain) Ariana Geerlings
- (Germany) Carolina Kuhl
- (Czech Republic) Jesika Malečková
- (Slovakia) Martina Okáľová
- (France) Alice Ramé
- (Germany) Lara Schmidt

The following player received entry as a lucky loser:

- (Japan) Yuki Naito
