= 2016 ITS Cup – Singles =

Singles
- 2016 ITS Cup

Final
- Champion: (Russia) Elizaveta Kulichkova
- Runner-up: (Russia) Ekaterina Alexandrova
- Score: 4–6, 6–2, 6–1

Events
Singles	Doubles
← 2015 ·	ITS Cup	· 2017 →

Barbora Krejčíková was the defending champion, but chose to participate in Bucharest instead.

Elizaveta Kulichkova won the title, defeating Ekaterina Alexandrova in an all-Russian final, 4–6, 6–2, 6–1.

== Seeds ==
1. (Russia) Elizaveta Kulichkova (champion)
2. (Czech Republic) Petra Cetkovská (second round)
3. (France) Myrtille Georges (first round)
4. (Russia) Ekaterina Alexandrova (final)
5. (Czech Republic) Tereza Smitková (second round)
6. (Czech Republic) Karolína Muchová (quarterfinals, withdrew)
7. (Croatia) Tena Lukas (quarterfinals)
8. (Poland) Katarzyna Kawa (first round)

== Main draw ==
=== Key ===
- Q = Qualifier
- WC = Wild card
- LL = Lucky loser
- Alt = Alternate
- SE = Special exempt
- PR = Protected ranking
- ITF = ITF entry
- JE = Junior exempt
- w/o = Walkover
- r = Retired
- d = Defaulted
- SR = Special ranking

=== Finals ===
Semifinals
1	(Russia) Elizaveta Kulichkova	6	6
(Italy) Anastasia Grymalska	2	4
4	(Russia) Ekaterina Alexandrova	6	3	6
(Czech Republic) Gabriela Pantůčková	1	6	1

Final
1	(Russia) Elizaveta Kulichkova	4	6	6
4	(Russia) Ekaterina Alexandrova	6	2	1

=== Top half ===
First round
1	(Russia) E Kulichkova	7	6
(Ukraine) A Shoshyna	5	4
Q	(Czech Republic) V Žovincová	2	6	6
(Slovakia) L Juríková	6	2	1
(Czech Republic) K Vaňková	0	2
(Russia) A Pribylova	6	6
Q	(Hungary) Á Bukta	6^{2}	5
7	(Croatia) T Lukas	7^{7}	7
3	(France) M Georges	3	3
(Italy) A Grymalska	6	6
(Ukraine) A Vasylyeva	5	2
(Austria) P König	7	6
WC	(Russia) E Makarova	1	1
Q	(Czech Republic) P Mendesová	6	6
(Bosnia and Herzegovina) E Burgić Bucko	2	7^{7}	6
8	(Poland) K Kawa	6	6^{5}	4

Second round
1	(Russia) E Kulichkova	6	6
Q	(Czech Republic) V Žovincová	4	3
(Russia) A Pribylova	3	3
7	(Croatia) T Lukas	6	6
(Italy) A Grymalska	6	6
(Austria) P König	3	1
Q	(Czech Republic) P Mendesová	2	7	6
(Bosnia and Herzegovina) E Burgić Bucko	6	5	3

Quarterfinals
1	(Russia) E Kulichkova	6	7^{7}
7	(Croatia) T Lukas	3	6^{5}
(Italy) A Grymalska	2	7^{7}	6
Q	(Czech Republic) P Mendesová	6	6^{5}	3

Semifinals
1	(Russia) E Kulichkova	6	6
(Italy) A Grymalska	2	4

=== Bottom half ===
First round
5	(Czech Republic) T Smitková	6	6
Q	(Austria) L-M Moser	2	1
WC	(Czech Republic) B Miklová	2	1
(Hungary) F Stollár	6	6
WC	(Czech Republic) A Sisková	6	4	1
WC	(Czech Republic) M Pantůčková	4	6	6
(Moldova) A Perper	2	6^{3}
4	(Russia) E Alexandrova	6	7^{7}
6	(Czech Republic) K Muchová	6	6
(Czech Republic) T Malíková	1	1
(Croatia) S Njirić	6	7^{7}
(Philippines) K Lehnert	4	6^{5}
(Czech Republic) G Pantůčková	7^{7}	6
(Poland) M Fręch	6^{3}	2
(Russia) A Tarasova	2	3
2	(Czech Republic) P Cetkovská	6	6

Second round
5	(Czech Republic) T Smitková	3	5
(Hungary) F Stollár	6	7
WC	(Czech Republic) M Pantůčková	2	3
4	(Russia) E Alexandrova	6	6
6	(Czech Republic) K Muchová	6	6
(Croatia) S Njirić	4	3
(Czech Republic) G Pantůčková	7^{8}	6
2	(Czech Republic) P Cetkovská	6^{6}	0

Quarterfinals
(Hungary) F Stollár	3	4
4	(Russia) E Alexandrova	6	6
6	(Czech Republic) K Muchová
(Czech Republic) G Pantůčková	w/o

Semifinals
4	(Russia) E Alexandrova	6	3	6
(Czech Republic) G Pantůčková	1	6	1
