= 2013 ITS Cup – Singles =

Singles
- 2013 ITS Cup

Final
- Champion: (Slovenia) Polona Hercog
- Runner-up: (Poland) Katarzyna Piter
- Score: 6–0, 6–3

Events
Singles	Doubles
← 2012 ·	ITS Cup	· 2014 →

María Teresa Torró Flor won the event in 2012 but chose to compete at the 2013 Gastein Ladies instead of defending her title.

Polona Hercog won the title, defeating Katarzyna Piter in the final, 6–0, 6–3.

== Seeds ==
1. (Slovenia) Polona Hercog (champion)
2. (Czech Republic) Barbora Záhlavová-Strýcová (semifinals)
3. (Czech Republic) Eva Birnerová (first round)
4. (France) Pauline Parmentier (first round)
5. (Ukraine) Maryna Zanevska (semifinals)
6. (Italy) Nastassja Burnett (first round)
7. (Ukraine) Nadiya Kichenok (quarterfinals)
8. (Romania) Andreea Mitu (second round)

== Main draw ==
=== Key ===
- Q = Qualifier
- WC = Wild card
- LL = Lucky loser
- Alt = Alternate
- SE = Special exempt
- PR = Protected ranking
- ITF = ITF entry
- JE = Junior exempt
- w/o = Walkover
- r = Retired
- d = Defaulted
- SR = Special ranking

=== Finals ===
Semifinals
1	(Slovenia) Polona Hercog	6	6
5	(Ukraine) Maryna Zanevska	0	2
(Poland) Katarzyna Piter	6	5	6
2	(Czech Republic) Barbora Záhlavová-Strýcová	4	7	4

Final
1	(Slovenia) Polona Hercog	6	6
(Poland) Katarzyna Piter	0	3

=== Top half ===
First round
1	(Slovenia) P Hercog	6	6
WC	(Czech Republic) G Pantůčková	0	2
WC	(Czech Republic) J Malečková	7	1
(Liechtenstein) S Vogt	5	0^{r}
(Czech Republic) S Záhlavová	6	6
(Poland) M Linette	3	4
WC	(Czech Republic) K Novotná	4	4
7	(Ukraine) N Kichenok	6	6
4	(France) P Parmentier	4	4
Q	(Czech Republic) T Malíková	6	6
(Italy) C Dentoni	6^{2}	7	0
(Czech Republic) R Voráčová	7^{7}	5	6
Q	(Czech Republic) P Rohanová	5	5
(Hungary) Á Bukta	7	7
(Poland) P Kania	6^{5}	2
5	(Ukraine) M Zanevska	7^{7}	6

Second round
1	(Slovenia) P Hercog	6	6
WC	(Czech Republic) J Malečková	1	0
(Czech Republic) S Záhlavová	2	1
7	(Ukraine) N Kichenok	6	6
Q	(Czech Republic) T Malíková	3	6	2
(Czech Republic) R Voráčová	6	3	6
(Hungary) Á Bukta	4	7^{7}	3
5	(Ukraine) M Zanevska	6	6^{3}	6

Quarterfinals
1	(Slovenia) P Hercog	6	6
7	(Ukraine) N Kichenok	4	2
(Czech Republic) R Voráčová	5	3
5	(Ukraine) M Zanevska	7	6

Semifinals
1	(Slovenia) P Hercog	6	6
5	(Ukraine) M Zanevska	0	2

=== Bottom half ===
First round
6	(Italy) N Burnett	1	7	6^{6}
(Czech Republic) M Borecká	6	5	7^{8}
(Poland) K Piter	6	6
Q	(Czech Republic) P Mendesová	0	2
(Romania) C Dinu	6	6
(Slovakia) K Kučová	3	4
(Czech Republic) B Krejčíková	6	6
3	(Czech Republic) E Birnerová	3	2
8	(Romania) A Mitu	6	6
(Czech Republic) D Allertová	1	4
(Belgium) A Van Uytvanck	6	6
(Hungary) R-L Jani	2	4
(Croatia) A Vrljić	1	4
Q	(Czech Republic) Z Zálabská	6	6
WC	(Czech Republic) B Štefková	6	6^{4}	6^{2}
2	(Czech Republic) B Záhlavová-Strýcová	3	7^{7}	7^{7}

Second round
(Czech Republic) M Borecká	4	3
(Poland) K Piter	6	6
(Romania) C Dinu	6	6
(Czech Republic) B Krejčíková	4	3
8	(Romania) A Mitu	2	5
(Belgium) A Van Uytvanck	6	7
Q	(Czech Republic) Z Zálabská	7^{7}	6^{4}	3
2	(Czech Republic) B Záhlavová-Strýcová	6^{5}	7^{7}	6

Quarterfinals
(Poland) K Piter	4	6	6
(Romania) C Dinu	6	4	1
(Belgium) A Van Uytvanck	6^{5}	1
2	(Czech Republic) B Záhlavová-Strýcová	7^{7}	6

Semifinals
(Poland) K Piter	6	5	6
2	(Czech Republic) B Záhlavová-Strýcová	4	7	4
