= 2015 ITS Cup – Doubles =

Doubles
- 2015 ITS Cup

Final
- Champions: (Czech Republic) Lenka Kunčíková (Czech Republic) Karolína Stuchlá
- Runners-up: (Netherlands) Cindy Burger (Czech Republic) Kateřina Vaňková
- Score: 1–6, 6–4, [12–10]

Events
Singles	Doubles
← 2014 ·	ITS Cup	· 2016 →

Petra Cetkovská and Renata Voráčová were the defending champions, but Voráčová chose to participate at the 2015 Swedish Open instead. Cetkovská partnered Kateřina Kramperová, but lost in the first round to Cindy Burger and Kateřina Vaňková.

Lenka Kunčíková and Karolína Stuchlá won the title, defeating Burger and Vaňková in the final, 1–6, 6–4, [12–10].

== Seeds ==
1. (Czech Republic) Barbora Krejčíková / (Latvia) Jeļena Ostapenko (first round)
2. (Czech Republic) Petra Cetkovská / (Czech Republic) Kateřina Kramperová (first round)
3. (Czech Republic) Lenka Kunčíková / (Czech Republic) Karolína Stuchlá (champions)
4. (Poland) Magdalena Fręch / (Georgia (country)) Sofia Shapatava (first round)

== Draw ==
=== Key ===
- Q = Qualifier
- WC = Wild card
- LL = Lucky loser
- Alt = Alternate
- SE = Special exempt
- PR = Protected ranking
- ITF = ITF entry
- JE = Junior exempt
- w/o = Walkover
- r = Retired
- d = Defaulted
- SR = Special ranking

First round
1	(Czech Republic) B Krejčíková (Latvia) J Ostapenko	6^{8}	7	[9]
(Austria) P König (Croatia) A Lekaj	7^{10}	5	[11]
(Czech Republic) M Borecká (Czech Republic) J Malečková	6	6
(France) C Paquet (France) I Ramialison	2	1
3	(Czech Republic) L Kunčíková (Czech Republic) K Stuchlá	7^{7}	7
(Croatia) J Fett (Bulgaria) E Kostova	6^{3}	5
(Ukraine) E Ianchuk (Ukraine) O Ianchuk	6	7
WC	(Czech Republic) V Raimrová (Russia) A Ushakova	1	5
WC	(Slovakia) B Kollárová (Czech Republic) A Sisková	2	0
WC	(Poland) V Domagała (Czech Republic) T Malíková	6	6
(Czech Republic) K Muchová (Czech Republic) B Štefková	6	6
4	(Poland) M Fręch (Georgia (country)) S Shapatava	4	3
(Czech Republic) K Hrabalová (Czech Republic) P Mendesová	4	1
(Slovakia) L Wienerová (Australia) K Wlodarczak	6	6
(Netherlands) C Burger (Czech Republic) K Vaňková	3	7	[10]
2	(Czech Republic) P Cetkovská (Czech Republic) K Kramperová	6	5	[5]

Quarterfinals
(Austria) P König (Croatia) A Lekaj	2	7	[10]
(Czech Republic) M Borecká (Czech Republic) J Malečková	6	5	[4]
3	(Czech Republic) L Kunčíková (Czech Republic) K Stuchlá	6	6
(Ukraine) E Ianchuk (Ukraine) O Ianchuk	3	4
WC	(Poland) V Domagała (Czech Republic) T Malíková	1	7^{7}	[10]
(Czech Republic) K Muchová (Czech Republic) B Štefková	6	6^{2}	[5]
(Slovakia) L Wienerová (Australia) K Wlodarczak	3	0
(Netherlands) C Burger (Czech Republic) K Vaňková	6	6

Semifinals
(Austria) P König (Croatia) A Lekaj	2	4
3	(Czech Republic) L Kunčíková (Czech Republic) K Stuchlá	6	6
WC	(Poland) V Domagała (Czech Republic) T Malíková	4	7	[10]
(Netherlands) C Burger (Czech Republic) K Vaňková	6	5	[12]

Final
3	(Czech Republic) L Kunčíková (Czech Republic) K Stuchlá	1	6	[12]
(Netherlands) C Burger (Czech Republic) K Vaňková	6	4	[10]
