= 2022 ITS Cup – Doubles =

Doubles
- 2022 ITS Cup

Final
- Champions: (Italy) Giulia Gatto-Monticone (Burundi) Sada Nahimana
- Runners-up: (Romania) Ilona Georgiana Ghioroaie (Romania) Oana Georgeta Simion
- Score: 6–1, 1–6, [10–5]

Events
Singles	Doubles
- ITS Cup

Jessie Aney and Anna Sisková were the defending champions but chose not to participate.

Giulia Gatto-Monticone and Sada Nahimana won the title, defeating Ilona Georgiana Ghioroaie and Oana Georgeta Simion in the final, 6–1, 1–6, [10–5].

== Seeds ==
1. (Indonesia) Beatrice Gumulya / (Switzerland) Conny Perrin (first round)
2. Darya Astakhova / (Slovenia) Nika Radišić (semifinals)
3. (Czech Republic) Johana Marková / (Bulgaria) Isabella Shinikova (first round)
4. (Romania) Cristina Dinu / (Poland) Weronika Falkowska (quarterfinals)

== Draw ==
Key

- Q = Qualifier
- WC = Wild card
- LL = Lucky loser
- Alt = Alternate
- ITF = ITF entry
- PR = Protected ranking
- SR = Special ranking
- SE = Special exempt
- JE = Junior exempt
- JR = Junior Accelerator Programme entrant
- CO = College Accelerator Programme entrant
- NG = Next Gen Accelerator Program entrant
- w/o = Walkover
- r = Retired
- d = Defaulted

=== Draw ===
First round
1	(Indonesia) B Gumulya (Switzerland) C Perrin	4	3
P Leykina; Ana Pribylova	6	6
(Czech Republic) K Kubáňová (Czech Republic) A Kučmová	3	2
(Italy) G Gatto-Monticone (Burundi) S Nahimana	6	6
4	(Romania) C Dinu (Poland) W Falkowska	6	6
(Czech Republic) D Hrdinková (Czech Republic) L Ševčíková	2	1
(Czech Republic) M Bayerlová (Bulgaria) D Evtimova	2	2
(Czech Republic) G Knutson (France) V Muntean	6	6
(Czech Republic) N Augustinová (Czech Republic) L Petruželová	1	4
(Romania) IG Ghioroaie (Romania) OG Simion	6	6
(Germany) T Morderger (Germany) Y Morderger	6	6
3	(Czech Republic) J Marková (Bulgaria) I Shinikova	3	3
(Australia) A Osborne (Germany) L Papadakis	6	6
(Czech Republic) I Šebestová (Czech Republic) D Viďmanová	2	4
WC	(Czech Republic) N Břečková (Czech Republic) D Hindová	5	5
2	D Astakhova (Slovenia) N Radišić	7	7

Quarterfinals
P Leykina; Ana Pribylova	5	6	[8]
(Italy) G Gatto-Monticone (Burundi) S Nahimana	7	1	[10]
4	(Romania) C Dinu (Poland) W Falkowska	4	0
(Czech Republic) G Knutson (France) V Muntean	6	6
(Romania) IG Ghioroaie (Romania) OG Simion	7^{7}	6
(Germany) T Morderger (Germany) Y Morderger	6^{5}	4
(Australia) A Osborne (Germany) L Papadakis	5	5
2	D Astakhova (Slovenia) N Radišić	7	7

Semifinals
(Italy) G Gatto-Monticone (Burundi) S Nahimana	6	7
(Czech Republic) G Knutson (France) V Muntean	4	5
(Romania) IG Ghioroaie (Romania) OG Simion	6	6
2	D Astakhova (Slovenia) N Radišić	3	4

Final
(Italy) G Gatto-Monticone (Burundi) S Nahimana	6	1	[10]
(Romania) IG Ghioroaie (Romania) OG Simion	1	6	[5]
