= 2017 ITS Cup – Doubles =

Doubles
- 2017 ITS Cup

Final
- Champion: (France) Amandine Hesse (Mexico) Victoria Rodríguez
- Runner-up: (Slovakia) Michaela Hončová (Romania) Raluca Georgiana Șerban
- Score: 3–6, 6–2, [10–6]

Events
Singles	Doubles
← 2016 ·	ITS Cup	· 2018 →

Ema Burgić Bucko and Jasmina Tinjić were the defending champions, but Burgić Bucko had retired from professional tennis earlier in the year. Tinjić partnered Anna Morgina, but they lost in the first round to Richèl Hogenkamp and Karolína Muchová.

Amandine Hesse and Victoria Rodríguez won the title, defeating Michaela Hončová and Raluca Georgiana Șerban in the final, 3–6, 6–2, [10–6].

== Seeds ==
1. (Slovenia) Dalila Jakupović / (Belarus) Lidziya Marozava (quarterfinals)
2. (Poland) Katarzyna Kawa / (Japan) Kotomi Takahata (first round)
3. (Bosnia and Herzegovina) Jasmina Tinjić / (Russia) Anna Morgina (first round)
4. (Ukraine) Oleksandra Korashvili / (Russia) Maria Marfutina (semifinals)

== Draw ==
=== Key ===
- Q = Qualifier
- WC = Wild card
- LL = Lucky loser
- Alt = Alternate
- SE = Special exempt
- PR = Protected ranking
- ITF = ITF entry
- JE = Junior exempt
- w/o = Walkover
- r = Retired
- d = Defaulted
- SR = Special ranking

First round
1	(Slovenia) D Jakupović (Belarus) L Marozava	6	6
(Austria) P König (Germany) L Schaeder	2	1
WC	(Czech Republic) L Kareisová (Slovakia) B Kollárová	6^{2}	1
(France) A Hesse (Mexico) V Rodríguez	7^{7}	6
4	(Ukraine) O Korashvili (Russia) M Marfutina	6	6
WC	(Czech Republic) N Břečková (Czech Republic) D Šumová	3	2
(Croatia) A Mijačika (Slovenia) N Potočnik	4	6	[5]
(France) V Muntean (Czech Republic) A Zarycká	6	1	[10]
(Finland) E Laine (United States) S Santamaria	6	7
(Russia) Ana Pribylova (Russia) Ann Pribylova	2	5
(Netherlands) R Hogenkamp (Czech Republic) K Muchová	6	6
3	(Russia) A Morgina (Bosnia and Herzegovina) J Tinjić	4	4
WC	(Czech Republic) A Kladivová (Czech Republic) A Sisková	2	6	[4]
(Belgium) M Benoît (Norway) U Eikeri	6	3	[10]
(Slovakia) M Hončová (Romania) RG Șerban	7	6
2	(Poland) K Kawa (Japan) K Takahata	5	2

Quarterfinals
1	(Slovenia) D Jakupović (Belarus) L Marozava	3	6	[8]
(France) A Hesse (Mexico) V Rodríguez	6	2	[10]
4	(Ukraine) O Korashvili (Russia) M Marfutina	7^{7}	1	[10]
(France) V Muntean (Czech Republic) A Zarycká	6^{3}	6	[5]
(Finland) E Laine (United States) S Santamaria	4	6^{5}
(Netherlands) R Hogenkamp (Czech Republic) K Muchová	6	7^{7}
(Belgium) M Benoît (Norway) U Eikeri	4	3
(Slovakia) M Hončová (Romania) RG Șerban	6	6

Semifinals
(France) A Hesse (Mexico) V Rodríguez	6	6
4	(Ukraine) O Korashvili (Russia) M Marfutina	4	1
(Netherlands) R Hogenkamp (Czech Republic) K Muchová
(Slovakia) M Hončová (Romania) RG Șerban	w/o

Final
(France) A Hesse (Mexico) V Rodríguez	3	6	[10]
(Slovakia) M Hončová (Romania) RG Șerban	6	2	[6]
