= 2024 ITS Cup – Doubles =

Doubles
- 2024 ITS Cup

Final
- Champions: Amina Anshba (Greece) Valentini Grammatikopoulou
- Runners-up: (United States) Jessie Aney (Germany) Lena Papadakis
- Score: 6–2, 6–4

Events
Singles	Doubles
- ITS Cup

Magdaléna Smékalová and Tereza Valentová were the defending champions but Valentová chose not to participate. Smékalová partnered alongside Julie Paštiková, but lost in the first round to Denisa Hindová and Jang Su-jeong.

Amina Anshba and Valentini Grammatikopoulou won the title, defeating Jessie Aney and Lena Papadakis in the final, 6–2, 6–4.

== Seeds ==
1. Amina Anshba / (Greece) Valentini Grammatikopoulou (champions)
2. (United States) Jessie Aney / (Germany) Lena Papadakis (final)
3. (China) Feng Shuo / (Latvia) Daniela Vismane (semifinals)
4. (Poland) Maja Chwalińska / (Czech Republic) Jesika Malečková (quarterfinals, withdrew)

== Draw ==
Key

- Q = Qualifier
- WC = Wild card
- LL = Lucky loser
- Alt = Alternate
- ITF = ITF entry
- PR = Protected ranking
- SR = Special ranking
- SE = Special exempt
- JE = Junior exempt
- JR = Junior Accelerator Programme entrant
- CO = College Accelerator Programme entrant
- NG = Next Gen Accelerator Program entrant
- w/o = Walkover
- r = Retired
- d = Defaulted

First round
1	A Anshba (Greece) V Grammatikopoulou	6	6
(Czech Republic) E Katzer (Czech Republic) J Marková	2	0
(Latvia) D Marcinkēviča (Georgia (country)) S Shapatava	4	1
(Latvia) DD Feldmane (Czech Republic) K Mandelíková	6	6
4	(Poland) M Chwalińska (Czech Republic) J Malečková	6	6
(Czech Republic) M Bayerlová (Australia) K McPhee	2	3
(Spain) A Geerlings (Germany) N Siedliska	6	6
(Czech Republic) K Kubáňová (Czech Republic) A Kučmová	3	3
(Slovakia) S Drugdová (Czech Republic) I Šebestová	6^{6}	7	[8]
(Australia) A Osborne (Czech Republic) J Štruplová	7^{8}	5	[10]
WC	(Czech Republic) A Dvořáčková (Czech Republic) L Šafářová	6	1	[7]
3	(China) S Feng (Latvia) D Vismane	3	6	[10]
(Czech Republic) D Hindová (South Korea) S-j Jang	6	6
(Czech Republic) J Paštiková (Czech Republic) M Smékalová	1	2
(Czech Republic) N Břečková (Latvia) J Denisenko	1	0
2	(United States) J Aney (Germany) L Papadakis	6	6

Quarterfinals
1	A Anshba (Greece) V Grammatikopoulou	6	6
(Latvia) DD Feldmane (Czech Republic) K Mandelíková	1	3
4	(Poland) M Chwalińska (Czech Republic) J Malečková
(Spain) A Geerlings (Germany) N Siedliska	w/o
(Australia) A Osborne (Czech Republic) J Štruplová	1	3
3	(China) S Feng (Latvia) D Vismane	6	6
(Czech Republic) D Hindová (South Korea) S-j Jang	4	6	[7]
2	(United States) J Aney (Germany) L Papadakis	6	4	[10]

Semifinals
1	A Anshba (Greece) V Grammatikopoulou	6	6
(Spain) A Geerlings (Germany) N Siedliska	3	1
3	(China) S Feng (Latvia) D Vismane	7^{7}	2	[5]
2	(United States) J Aney (Germany) L Papadakis	6^{4}	6	[10]

Final
1	A Anshba (Greece) V Grammatikopoulou	6	6
2	(United States) J Aney (Germany) L Papadakis	2	4
