= Sada Nahimana =

Burundian tennis player (born 2001)

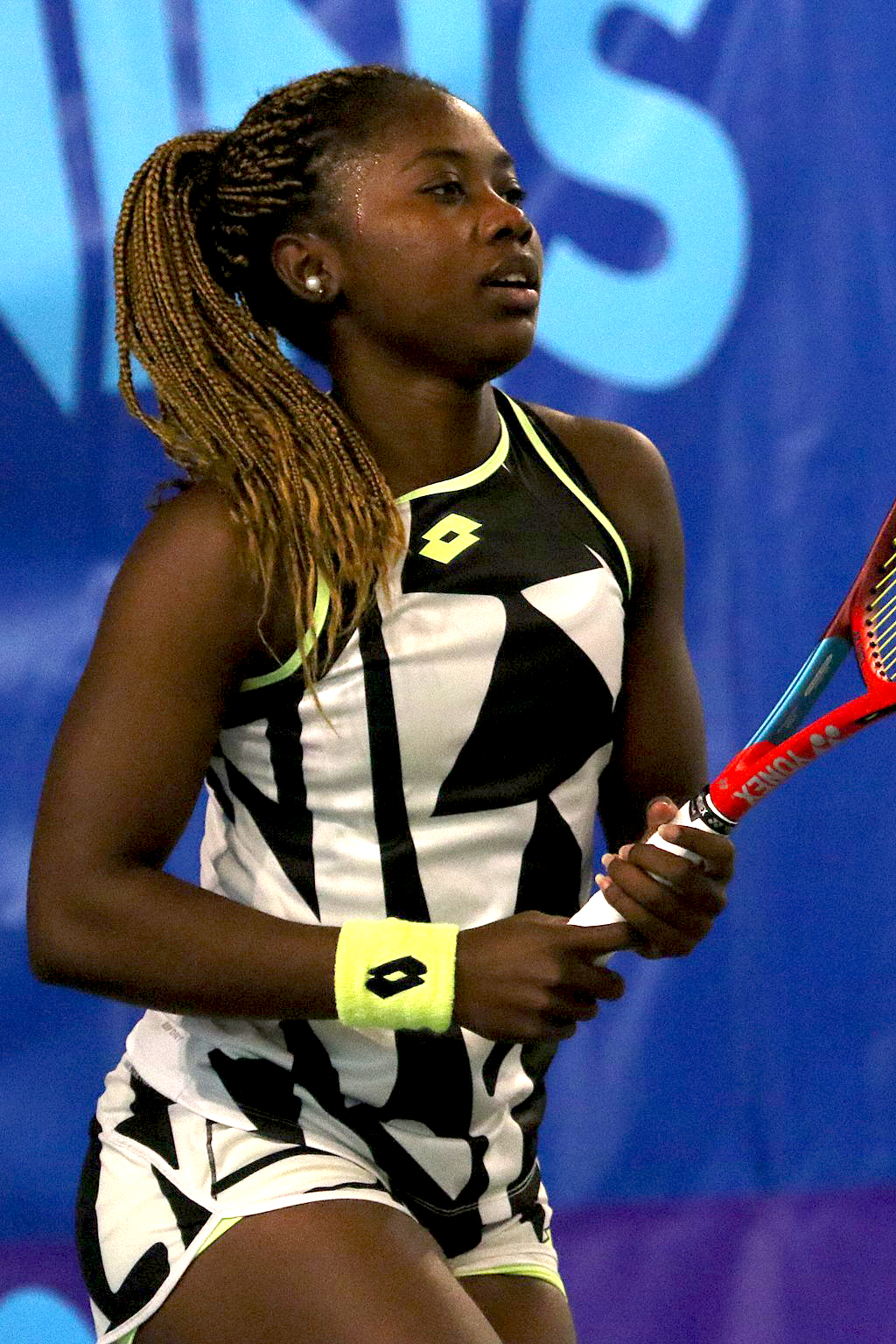
- Nahimana at the 2021 ITF Poitiers
- Country (sports): Burundi
- Born: 21 April 2001 (age 25)
- Turned pro: 9 November 2015
- Plays: Right (two-handed backhand)
- Prize money: US$ 240,679

Singles
- Career record: 236–162
- Career titles: 5 ITF
- Highest ranking: No. 212 (16 March 2026)
- Current ranking: No. 231 (18 May 2026)

Grand Slam singles results
- Australian Open: Q1 (2026)
- US Open: Q1 (2025)

Doubles
- Career record: 108–79
- Career titles: 1 WTA 125, 9 ITF
- Highest ranking: No. 199 (27 October 2025)
- Current ranking: No. 271 (18 May 2026)
- Last updated on: 21 May 2026.

Sada Nahimana (born 21 April 2001) is a Burundian tennis player.

She has a career-high singles ranking of world No. 218, achieved on 5 January 2026, and peaked at No. 199 on the WTA doubles rankings on 27 October 2025.

Nahimana has won five singles and nine doubles titles on the ITF Women's World Tennis Tour. She made her WTA Tour main-draw debut at the 2018 Rabat Grand Prix, partnering with Egyptian player Sandra Samir in doubles.

== Junior years ==
=== Grand Slam tournament singles performance ===
- Australian Open: 1R (2019)
- French Open: 2R (2018)
- Wimbledon: 2R (2018)
- US Open: 1R (2018)

== Professional ==
She defeated former top-10 player Kristina Mladenovic at the 2022 ITS Cup in Olomouc.

Nahimana made her singles WTA Tour debut at the 2023 Morocco Open in Rabat, becoming the first Burundian in a WTA tournament main draw. She lost to Jana Fett in the first round.

Nahimana qualified for the 2025 Rabat Grand Prix and defeated wildcard entrant Aya El Aouni in the first round to become the first player from Burundi to win a WTA Tour main-draw match. Nahimana lost in the second round to 10th seed Jéssica Bouzas Maneiro, in three sets.

At the 2026 Morocco Open in Rabat, she defeated Ajla Tomljanović recording her first win over a top-100 player.

== WTA 125 finals ==
=== Doubles: 2 (1 title, 1 runner-up) ===
Result	W–L	Date	Tournament	Surface	Partner	Opponents	Score
Loss	0–1	Nov 2025	Florianópolis Open, Brazil	Clay	(France) Carole Monnet	(Spain) Irene Burillo (Georgia (country)) Ekaterine Gorgodze	1–6, 4–6
Win	1–1	Nov 2026	Angola Ladies Open, Angola	Hard	(Kenya) Angella Okutoyi	(Poland) Martyna Kubka (Lithuania) Justina Mikulskytė	6–4, 6–4

== ITF Circuit finals ==
=== Singles: 14 (5 titles, 9 runner-ups) ===
Legend W60 tournaments (0–1) W50 tournaments (3–1) W25/35 tournaments (1–4) W15 tournaments (1–3)	Finals by surface Hard (1–3) Clay (4–6)

Result	W–L	Date	Tournament	Tier	Surface	Opponent	Score
Loss	0–1	Aug 2019	ITF Nairobi, Kenya	W15	Hard	(India) Mahak Jain	1–6, 4–6
Loss	0–2	Aug 2019	ITF Nairobi, Kenya	W15	Hard	(India) Mahak Jain	1–6, 1–6
Win	1–2	Oct 2019	Lagos Open, Nigeria	W25	Hard	(Brazil) Laura Pigossi	2–6, 6–4, 6–3
Loss	1–3	Nov 2019	ITF Monastir, Tunisia	W15	Hard	(Italy) Lucrezia Stefanini	4–6, 0–6
Win	2–3	Apr 2021	ITF Antalya, Turkey	W15	Clay	(Ukraine) Anastasiya Soboleva	6–4, 7–6^{(10–8)}
Loss	2–4	Aug 2022	Přerov Cup, Czech Republic	W60	Clay	(Czech Republic) Barbora Palicová	2–6, 6–1, 0–6
Loss	2–5	Apr 2023	ITF Bujumbura, Burundi	W25	Clay	(France) Alice Robbe	1–6, 4–6
Loss	2–6	Apr 2024	ITF Hammamet, Tunisia	W35	Clay	(Belgium) Alison van Uytvanck	4–6, 2–6
Loss	2–7	Aug 2024	ITF Collonge-Bellerive, Switzerland	W35	Clay	(Turkey) Ayla Aksu	6–3, 1–6, 4–6
Win	3–7	Sep 2024	ITF Slobozia, Romania	W50	Clay	(Serbia) Dejana Radanović	6–4, 6–1
Win	4–7	Mar 2025	ITF Bujumbura, Burundi	W50	Clay	(France) Émeline Dartron	6–1, 6–1
Win	5–7	Apr 2025	ITF Bujumbura, Burundi	W50	Clay	(France) Tiantsoa Sarah Rakotomanga Rajaonah	6–3, 6–2
Loss	5–8	Apr 2026	ITF Bujumbura, Burundi	W50	Clay	(France) Alice Tubello	1–6, 3–6
Loss	5–9	May 2026	ITF Platja d'Aro, Spain	W35	Clay	(Spain) Ane Mintegi del Olmo	0–6, 3–6

=== Doubles: 18 (9 titles, 9 runner-ups) ===
Legend W60/75 tournaments (1–2) W40/50 tournaments (1–1) W25/35 tournaments (6–5) W15 tournaments (1–1)	Finals by surface Hard (2–4) Clay (7–5)

Result	W–L	Date	Tournament	Tier	Surface	Partner	Opponents	Score
Loss	0–1	Nov 2019	ITF Tabarka, Tunisia	W15	Hard	(France) Yasmine Mansouri	(Germany) Julyette Steur (Ukraine) Ganna Poznikhirenko	6–7^{(9)}, 3–6
Win	1–1	Apr 2021	ITF Antalya, Turkey	W15	Clay	(Australia) Olivia Gadecki	(South Korea) Lee So-ra (Japan) Misaki Matsuda	6–3, 1–6, [11–9]
Loss	1–2	Jun 2021	ITF Otočec, Slovenia	W25	Clay	(Slovenia) Pia Lovrič	(Norway) Ulrikke Eikeri (Hungary) Réka Luca Jani	7–5, 4–6, [5–10]
Loss	1–3	Jun 2021	ITF Périgueux, France	W25	Clay	(Czech Republic) Anna Sisková	(France) Diane Parry (France) Margot Yerolymos	4–6, 2–6
Loss	1–4	Oct 2021	ITF Hamburg, Germany	W25	Hard	(Australia) Olivia Gadecki	(Latvia) Kamilla Bartone (Switzerland) Ylena In-Albon	4–6, 3–6
Win	2–4	Jul 2022	ITS Cup Olomouc, Czech Republic	W60	Clay	(Italy) Giulia Gatto-Monticone	(Romania) Ilona Georgiana Ghioroaie (Romania) Oana Georgeta Simion	6–1, 1–6, [10–5]
Win	3–4	Jan 2023	ITF Monastir, Tunisia	W40	Hard	(Romania) Andreea Prisăcariu	(Russia) Alena Fomina-Klotz (Belarus) Iryna Shymanovich	7–5, 6–4
Win	4–4	Dec 2023	ITF Nairobi, Kenya	W25	Clay	(Kenya) Angella Okutoyi	(United States) Jessie Aney (Germany) Lena Papadakis	6–4, 3–6, [10–7]
Loss	4–5	Apr 2024	ITF Bujumbura, Burundi	W35	Clay	(Latvia) Kamilla Bartone	(Poland) Weronika Falkowska (Netherlands) Stéphanie Visscher	3–6, 6–4, [5–10]
Win	5–5	Apr 2024	ITF Bujumbura, Burundi	W35	Clay	(Latvia) Kamilla Bartone	(Switzerland) Naïma Karamoko (Latvia) Diāna Marcinkēviča	4–6, 6–3, [10–7]
Win	6–5	Aug 2024	ITF Bydgoszcz, Poland	W35	Clay	(Japan) Rinon Okuwaki	(Ukraine) Maryna Kolb (Ukraine) Nadiia Kolb	6–4, 6–1
Loss	6–6	Oct 2024	ITF Santa Margherita di Pula, Italy	W35	Clay	(United States) Jaeda Daniel	(Italy) Miriana Tona (Italy) Anastasia Abbagnato	7–6^{(3)}, 3–6, [10–12]
Loss	6–7	Oct 2024	Open Nantes Atlantique, France	W50	Hard (i)	(Latvia) Diāna Marcinkēviča	(United States) Tyra Caterina Grant (Italy) Camilla Rosatello	2–6, 1–6
Win	7–7	Dec 2024	ITF Nairobi, Kenya	W35	Clay	(Japan) Rinon Okuwaki	(France) Alyssa Réguer (Belgium) Vicky Van de Peer	7–6^{(3)}, 6–2
Win	8–7	Jan 2025	ITF Nairobi, Kenya	W35	Clay	(Kenya) Angella Okutoyi	(Netherlands) Demi Tran (Netherlands) Lian Tran	6–3, 6–3
Loss	8–8	Apr 2025	ITS Calvi, France	W75	Hard	(India) Riya Bhatia	(Bulgaria) Lia Karatancheva (Sweden) Lisa Zaar	4–6, 3–6
Loss	8–9	Jun 2025	ITF Bucharest, Romania	W75	Clay	(India) Riya Bhatia	(France) Estelle Cascino (Romania) Patricia Maria Țig	6–4, 3–6, [6–10]
Win	9–9	Oct 2026	ITF Villeneuve D'ascq, France	W35	Hard	(United States) Jaeda Daniel	(South Korea) Kim Eun-chae (South Korea) Im Hee-rae	6–3, 6–2

== ITF Junior Circuit finals ==
=== Singles (1–7) ===
Legend
Grade 2 (0–2)
Grade 3 (1–0)
Grade 4 (0–4)
Grade 5 (0–1)

Result	W–L	Date	Tournament	Tier	Surface	Opponent	Score
Loss	0–1	May 2015	Algiers, Algeria	Grade 5	Clay	(Italy) Martina Zerulo	6–7^{(2–7)}, 3–6
Loss	0–2	Jan 2016	Hammamet, Tunisia	Grade 2	Clay	(Romania) Ilona Georgiana Ghioroaie	2–6, 2–6
Loss	0–3	Oct 2016	Rabat, Morocco	Grade 4	Clay	(Croatia) Noa Krznarić	4–6, 5–7
Win	1–3	Oct 2015	Mohammedia, Morocco	Grade 3	Clay	(Morocco) Diae El Jardi	6–2, 6–2
Loss	1–4	Oct 2017	Rabat, Morocco	Grade 4	Clay	(Italy) Federica Sacco	3–6, 6–7^{(5–7)}
Loss	1–5	Mar 2018	Marrakech, Morocco	Grade 4	Clay	(Morocco) Diae El Jardi	6–4, 4–6, 4–6
Loss	1–6	Apr 2018	Tlemcen, Algeria	Grade 2	Clay	(Spain) Gabriela Martinez Asensi	4–6, 6–7^{(2–7)}
Loss	1–7	May 2018	Casablanca, Morocco	Grade 4	Clay	(France) Yasmine Mansouri	1–6, 3–6

=== Doubles (7–4) ===
Legend
Grade 1 (1–0)
Grade 2 (3–0)
Grade 3 (0–2)
Grade 4 (3–2)

Result	W–L	Date	Tournament	Tier	Surface	Partner	Opponents	Score
Win	1–0	May 2015	ITF Casablanca, Morocco	Grade 4	Clay	(Morocco) Diae El Jardi	(Egypt) Lamis Alhussein Abdel Aziz (Egypt) Laila Elnimr	6–2, 4–6, [10–8]
Win	2–0	May 2015	ITF Algiers, Algeria	Grade 4	Clay	(Morocco) Oumaima Aziz	(Tunisia) Mouna Bouzgarrou (Morocco) Lilya Hadab	6–3, 6–4
Win	3–0	Oct 2015	ITF Rabat, Morocco	Grade 4	Clay	(Morocco) Oumaima Aziz	(Germany) Franziska-Marie Ahrend (Germany) Linda Puppendahl	6–3, 6–2
Loss	3–1	Oct 2015	ITF Mohammedia, Morocco	Grade 3	Clay	(Morocco) Diae El Jardi	(Morocco) Oumaima Aziz (Bulgaria) Gergana Topalova	3–6, 4–6
Win	4–1	Nov 2016	ITF Mérida, Mexico	Grade 1	Clay	(Estonia) Maileen Nuudi	(Mexico) María Portillo Ramírez (United States) Sofia Sewing	4–6, 6–3, [11–9]
Win	5–1	Jan 2017	ITF Hammamet, Tunisia	Grade 2	Clay	(Turkey) Selin Övünç	(Switzerland) Svenja Ochsner (Germany) Emelie Luisa Schwarte	6–4, 6–3
Win	6–1	Feb 2017	ITF Tunis, Tunisia	Grade 2	Clay	(Spain) Dalila Said	(Romania) Selma Stefania Cadar (Switzerland) Simona Waltert	6–3, 1–6, [10–8]
Loss	6–2	Oct 2017	ITF Rabat, Morocco	Grade 4	Clay	(Morocco) Oumaima Aziz	(United Kingdom) Esther Adeshina (United Kingdom) Erin Richardson	4–6, 6–7^{(2)}
Loss	6–3	Oct 2017	ITF Mohammedia, Morocco	Grade 3	Clay	(Morocco) Oumaima Aziz	(United Kingdom) Esther Adeshina (United Kingdom) Erin Richardson	w/o
Loss	6–4	Mar 2018	ITF Marrakech, Morocco	Grade 4	Clay	(Burundi) Aisha Niyonkuru	(Morocco) Oumaima Aziz (Morocco) Diae El Jardi	0–4, 4–2, [4–10]
Win	7–4	Apr 2018	ITF Tlemcen, Algeria	Grade 2	Clay	(Turkey) Selin Övünç	(Morocco) Oumaima Aziz (Algeria) Lynda Benkaddour	6–0, 6–3

== Billie Jean King Cup participation ==
=== Singles (10–3) ===
Edition	Round	Date	Location	Against	Opponent	W/L	Score
2022 BJK Cup	Europe/Africa Zone	5 July 2022	Skopje, North Macedonia	Malta	(Malta) Francesca Curmi	W	6–4, 3–6, 6–2
2022 BJK Cup	Europe/Africa Zone	6 July 2022	Skopje, North Macedonia	Portugal	(Portugal) Francisca Jorge	L	5–7, 6–0, 4–6
2022 BJK Cup	Europe/Africa Zone	7 July 2022	Skopje, North Macedonia	Seychelles	(Seychelles) Marie-May Isnard	W	6–0, 6–0
2024 BJK Cup	Africa Group III	10 June 2024	Nairobi, Kenya	Tunisia	(Tunisia) Chiraz Bechri	W	6–2, 6–2
2024 BJK Cup	Africa Group III	11 June 2024	Nairobi, Kenya	Mauritius	(Mauritius) Tejaswini Jessoo	W	6–0, 6–0
2024 BJK Cup	Africa Group III	12 June 2024	Nairobi, Kenya	Kenya	(Kenya) Angella Okutoyi	L	4–6, 4–6
2024 BJK Cup	Africa Group III	13 June 2024	Nairobi, Kenya	Botswana	(Botswana) Ekua Youri	W	6–4, 6–3
2024 BJK Cup	Africa Group III	15 June 2024	Nairobi, Kenya	Zimbabwe	(Zimbabwe) Sasha Natalie Chimedza	W	6–3, 6–4
