= Oana Georgeta Simion =

Romanian tennis player

- Country (sports): Romania
- Born: 8 March 1996 (age 30)
- Plays: Right-handed
- Prize money: $156,899

Singles
- Career record: 393–250
- Career titles: 10 ITF
- Highest ranking: No. 380 (26 July 2021)
- Current ranking: No. 573 (24 August 2026)

Doubles
- Career record: 304–155
- Career titles: 36 ITF
- Highest ranking: No. 268 (30 January 2023)
- Current ranking: No. 894 (24 August 2026)
- Last updated on: 27 August 2026.

Oana Georgeta Simion (born 8 March 1996) is a Romanian tennis player.

Simion has a career-high singles ranking by the WTA of 380, reached on 26 July 2021. She also has a career-high WTA doubles ranking of 268, achieved on 30 January 2023. She has won 46 titles on the ITF Women's World Tennis Tour, ten in singles and 36 in doubles.

Simion made her WTA Tour main-draw debut at the 2021 Winners Open.

== ITF Circuit finals ==
=== Singles: 23 (10 titles, 13 runner-ups) ===
Legend W25 tournaments W10/15 tournaments	Finals by surface Clay (10–13)

Result	W–L	Date	Tournament	Tier	Surface	Opponent	Score
Loss	0–1	Jun 2014	ITF Galați, Romania	W10	Clay	(Romania) Elena Bogdan	3–6, 1–6
Win	1–1	Jul 2014	ITF Iași, Romania	W10	Clay	(Romania) Cristina Stancu	6–2, 6–1
Loss	1–2	May 2016	ITF Galați, Romania	W10	Clay	(Romania) Miriam Bulgaru	3–6, 1–6
Loss	1–3	Aug 2016	ITF Galați, Romania	W10	Clay	(Italy) Giulia Gatto-Monticone	3–6, 4–6
Win	2–3	Nov 2016	ITF Casablanca, Morocco	W10	Clay	(Romania) Daiana Negreanu	6–3, 6–1
Loss	2–4	Dec 2016	ITF Casablanca, Morocco	W10	Clay	(Romania) Cristina Ene	3–6, 2–6
Win	3–4	Jan 2017	ITF Cairo, Egypt	W15	Clay	(Romania) Cristina Ene	6–4, 6–3
Loss	3–5	Nov 2017	ITF Casablanca, Morocco	W15	Clay	(Russia) Victoria Kan	0–6, 3–6
Win	4–5	Nov 2017	ITF Agadir, Morocco	W15	Clay	(Romania) Cristina Adamescu	6–4, 6–1
Win	5–5	Feb 2018	ITF Antalya, Turkey	W15	Clay	(Romania) Ilona Georgiana Ghioroaie	2–6, 6–2, 7–5
Loss	5–6	Apr 2018	ITF Antalya, Turkey	W15	Clay	(United States) Elizabeth Halbauer	4–6, 2–6
Loss	5–7	Jul 2018	ITF Focșani, Romania	W15	Clay	(Romania) Andreea Mitu	4–6, 4–6
Loss	5–8	Nov 2018	ITF Antalya, Turkey	W15	Clay	(Japan) Naho Sato	6–3, 4–6, 6–7^{(3)}
Loss	5–9	Mar 2019	ITF Amiens, France	W15	Clay	(Spain) Rebeka Masarova	0–6, 3–6
Loss	5–10	May 2019	ITF Barletta, Italy	W15	Clay	(United States) Elizabeth Mandlik	0–6, 2–6
Win	6–10	Sep 2019	ITF Curtea de Argeș, Romania	W15	Clay	(Czech Republic) Aneta Kladivová	6–3, 6–2
Win	7–10	Oct 2019	Telavi Open, Georgia	W15	Clay	(Czech Republic) Anna Sisková	6–2, 6–3
Loss	7–11	Oct 2019	Telavi Open, Georgia	W15	Clay	(Russia) Daria Kudashova	2–6, 6–4, 4–6
Win	8–11	Dec 2019	ITF Cairo, Egypt	W15	Clay	(Germany) Julyette Steur	3–6, 6–2, 6–1
Win	9–11	Dec 2019	ITF Cairo, Egypt	W15	Clay	(Germany) Julyette Steur	6–2, 6–1
Loss	9–12	Sep 2022	ITF Trieste, Italy	W25	Clay	(Argentina) Julia Riera	1–6, 4–6
Loss	9–13	Jul 2024	Satu Mare, Romania	W15	Clay	(Romania) Patricia Maria Țig	1–6, 5–7
Win	10–13	Aug 2024	ITF Bucharest, Romania	W15	Clay	(Romania) Ștefani Bojică	6–3, 6–4

=== Doubles: 57 (36 titles, 21 runner-ups) ===
Legend W60 tournaments W25/35 tournaments W10/15 tournaments	Finals by surface Hard (6–2) Clay (30–19)

Result	W–L	Date	Tournament	Tier	Surface	Partner	Opponents	Score
Loss	0–1	Jun 2013	ITF Balș, Romania	W10	Clay	(Romania) Gabriela Talabă	(Romania) Jaqueline Cristian (Romania) Raluca Elena Platon	6–7^{(4)}, 4–6
Win	1–1	Jun 2014	ITF Sibiu, Romania	W10	Clay	(Romania) Camelia Hristea	(Romania) Raluca Șerban (Czech Republic) Vendula Žovincová	7–6^{(2)}, 6–1
Loss	1–2	Jul 2014	ITF Iași, Romania	W10	Clay	(Romania) Gabriela Talabă	(Romania) Raluca Elena Platon (Romania) Cristina Stancu	6–2, 4–6, [6–10]
Loss	1–3	Aug 2014	ITF Bucharest, Romania	W10	Clay	(Romania) Camelia Hristea	(Romania) Raluca Elena Platon (Romania) Cristina Stancu	1–6, 1–6
Win	2–3	Sep 2014	ITF Galați, Romania	W10	Clay	(Romania) Ágnes Szatmári	(Romania) Diana Enache (Spain) Arabela Fernández Rabener	4–6, 6–4, [10–8]
Win	3–3	Nov 2014	ITF Heraklion, Greece	W10	Hard	(Romania) Raluca Șerban	(Serbia) Natalija Kostić (Serbia) Nevena Selaković	6–4, 6–2
Win	4–3	Mar 2015	ITF Gonesse, France	W10	Clay	(Hungary) Ágnes Bukta	(Ukraine) Elizaveta Ianchuk (Ukraine) Olga Ianchuk	6–4, 3–6, [10–6]
Win	5–3	Apr 2015	ITF Pula, Italy	W10	Clay	(Romania) Irina Bara	(France) Margot Yerolymos (Belgium) Kimberley Zimmermann	7–5, 6–4
Win	6–3	Jun 2015	ITF Galați, Romania	W10	Clay	(Romania) Gabriela Talabă	(Moldova) Daniela Ciobanu (Romania) Camelia Hristea	4–6, 7–5, [10–8]
Win	7–3	Jul 2015	ITF Iași, Romania	W10	Clay	(Romania) Ioana Loredana Roșca	(Ukraine) Maryna Kolb (Ukraine) Nadiya Kolb	6–3, 7–5
Loss	7–4	Aug 2015	ITF Bucharest, Romania	W10	Clay	(Romania) Elena-Gabriela Ruse	(Romania) Diana Enache (Romania) Cristina Dinu	0–6, 2–6
Win	8–4	Feb 2016	ITF Sharm El Sheikh, Egypt	W10	Hard	(Belgium) Britt Geukens	(Germany) Nora Niedmers (Germany) Julia Wachaczyk	2–6, 6–3, [10–7]
Loss	8–5	Feb 2016	ITF Sharm El Sheikh, Egypt	W10	Hard	(Bulgaria) Julia Terziyska	(South Africa) Ilze Hattingh (South Africa) Madrie Le Roux	1–6, 2–6
Win	9–5	Feb 2016	ITF Sharm El Sheikh, Egypt	W10	Hard	(Romania) Elena-Teodora Cadar	(Sweden) Jacqueline Cabaj Awad (Ukraine) Veronika Kapshay	6–3, 6–2
Loss	9–6	Jun 2016	ITF Galați, Romania	W10	Clay	(Romania) Cristina Adamescu	(Moldova) Alexandra Perper (Romania) Ioana Loredana Roșca	3–6, 4–6
Win	10–6	Jul 2016	ITF Focșani, Romania	W10	Clay	(Romania) Gabriela Talabă	(Moldova) Daniela Ciobanu (France) Kassandra Davesne	5–7, 6–1, [10–6]
Win	11–6	Aug 2016	ITF Galați, Romania	W10	Clay	(Romania) Gabriela Talabă	(Romania) Karola Bejenaru (Romania) Georgia Crăciun	5–7, 6–4, [10–3]
Win	12–6	Nov 2016	ITF Casablanca, Morocco	W10	Clay	(Romania) Daiana Negreanu	(Spain) Georgina García Pérez (Bulgaria) Julia Stamatova	5–7, 7–5, [12–10]
Win	13–6	Nov 2016	ITF Casablanca, Morocco	W10	Clay	(Romania) Daiana Negreanu	(Oman) Fatma Al-Nabhani (Spain) Olga Parres Azcoitia	6–2, 6–1
Loss	13–7	Mar 2017	ITF Herkalion, Greece	W15	Clay	(Romania) Raluca Șerban	(Slovakia) Michaela Hončová (Italy) Francesca Palmigiano	4–6, 3–6
Win	14–7	Mar 2017	ITF Herkalion, Greece	W15	Clay	(Romania) Raluca Șerban	(Canada) Charlotte Robillard-Millette (Canada) Carol Zhao	3–6, 7–6^{(2)}, [10–2]
Loss	14–8	May 2017	ITF Dunakeszi, Hungary	W25	Clay	(Romania) Daiana Negreanu	(Romania) Irina Bara (Romania) Mihaela Buzărnescu	6–1, 1–6, [3–10]
Win	15–8	Aug 2017	ITF Bucharest, Romania	W15	Clay	(Romania) Gabriela Talabă	(Romania) Elena Bogdan (Romania) Elena-Teodora Cadar	6–3, 0–6, [12–10]
Loss	15–9	Sep 2017	ITF Mamaia, Hungary	W25	Clay	(Bosnia and Herzegovina) Dea Herdželaš	(Russia) Anastasiya Komardina (Romania) Elena-Gabriela Ruse	6–3, 1–6, [6–10]
Win	16–9	Nov 2017	ITF Beni Mellal, Morocco	W15	Clay	(Croatia) Mariana Dražić	(Italy) Federica Arcidiacono (Spain) Olga Parres Azcoitia	6–4, 6–2
Loss	16–10	Nov 2017	ITF Agadir, Morocco	W15	Clay	(Croatia) Mariana Dražić	(Austria) Pia König (Italy) Miriana Tona	6–4, 6–7^{(5)}, [8–10]
Win	17–10	Feb 2018	ITF Antalya, Turkey	W15	Hard	(Romania) Raluca Șerban	(Japan) Mana Ayukawa (Switzerland) Nina Stadler	6–2, 7–6^{(5)}
Loss	17–11	Mar 2018	ITF Hammamet, Tunisia	W15	Clay	(Austria) Melanie Klaffner	(Romania) Oana Gavrilă (Brazil) Laura Pigossi	5–7, 7–6^{(6)}, [9–11]
Loss	17–12	Mar 2018	ITF Antalya, Turkey	W15	Clay	(Romania) Alexandra Diana Braga	(Japan) Haruna Arakawa (Belarus) Ilona Kremen	1–6, 0–6
Win	18–12	Jul 2018	ITF Focșani, Romania	W15	Clay	(Romania) Andreea Mitu	(Romania) Selma Ștefania Cadar (Russia) Anastasia Kharitonova	4–6, 6–2, [10–6]
Win	19–12	Jul 2018	ITF Horb, Germany	W25	Clay	(Romania) Gabriela Talabă	(Slovakia) Jana Jablonovská (Slovakia) Vivien Juhászová	6–3, 6–0
Loss	19–13	Nov 2018	ITF Antalya, Turkey	W15	Clay	(Romania) Ioana Gașpar	(Germany) Lisa Ponomar (Japan) Naho Sato	4–6, 2–6
Win	20–13	Nov 2018	ITF Antalya, Turkey	W15	Hard	(Romania) Georgia Crăciun	(Romania) Ioana Gașpar (Romania) Andreea Prisăcariu	6–1, 6–3
Win	21–13	Feb 2019	ITF Antalya, Turkey	W15	Clay	(Turkey) Cemre Anıl	(Ukraine) Maryna Chernyshova (Israel) Vlada Katic	6–2, 6–4
Loss	21–14	Mar 2019	ITF Tabarka, Tunisia	W15	Clay	(Slovakia) Chantal Škamlová	(Romania) Oana Gavrilă (Italy) Martina Spigarelli	5–7, 6–3, [8–10]
Loss	21–15	Apr 2019	ITF Pelham, United States	W25	Clay	(Romania) Gabriela Talabă	(United States) Usue Maitane Arconada (United States) Caroline Dolehide	3–6, 0–6
Loss	21–16	Jun 2019	ITF Kaltenkirchen, Germany	W15	Clay	(Uzbekistan) Albina Khabibulina	(Australia) Gabriella Da Silva-Fick (Germany) Anna Klasen	4–6, 5–7
Loss	21–17	Sep 2019	ITF Curtea de Argeș, Romania	W15	Clay	(Romania) Arina Vasilescu	(Romania) Oana Smaranda Corneanu (Romania) Oana Gavrilă	6–7^{(6)}, 6–4, [8–10]
Loss	21–18	Sep 2019	ITF Frýdek-Místek, Czech Republic	W25	Clay	(Germany) Julia Wachaczyk	(Croatia) Lea Bošković (Greece) Despina Papamichail	3–6, 2–6
Win	22–18	Oct 2019	Telavi Open, Georgia	W15	Clay	(Czech Republic) Anna Sisková	(Kazakhstan) Yekaterina Dmitrichenko (Russia) Anna Ureke	6–1, 6–0
Win	23–18	Oct 2019	Telavi Open, Georgia	W15	Clay	(Russia) Margarita Lazareva	(Russia) Valeriia Olianovskaia (Russia) Taisya Pachkaleva	6–4, 4–6, [10–8]
Win	24–18	Dec 2019	ITF Cairo, Egypt	W15	Clay	(Russia) Maria Marfutina	(Slovenia) Nastja Kolar (Russia) Anna Makhorkina	3–6, 6–0, [10–2]
Win	25–18	Nov 2020	ITF Pazardzhik, Bulgaria	W15	Clay	(Romania) Oana Gavrilă	(Bulgaria) Katerina Dimitrova (United States) Isabelle Kouzmanov	6–7^{(1)}, 6–4, [10–4]
Win	26–18	Feb 2021	ITF Antalya, Turkey	W15	Clay	(Croatia) Mariana Dražić	(Spain) Jéssica Bouzas Maneiro (Netherlands) Lexie Stevens	4–6, 6–3, [12–10]
Win	27–18	May 2021	ITF Platja d'Aro, Spain	W25	Clay	(Lithuania) Justina Mikulskytė	(Philippines) Alex Eala (Russia) Oksana Selekhmeteva	6–3, 7–5
Win	28–18	Jun 2021	ITF Jönköping, Sweden	W25	Clay	(Italy) Cristiana Ferrando	(Sweden) Jacqueline Cabaj Awad (France) Carole Monnet	7–5, 6–4
Win	29–18	Jan 2022	ITF Cairo, Egypt	W15	Clay	(Russia) Anna Ureke	(Russia) Mariia Tkacheva (Russia) Anastasia Zolotareva	6–3, 7–6^{(4)}
Loss	29–19	Jul 2022	ITF Tarvisio, Italy	W25	Clay	(Romania) Ilona Georgiana Ghioroaie	(Croatia) Lea Bošković (Slovenia) Veronika Erjavec	1–6, 7–6^{(5)}, [7–10]
Loss	29–20	Jul 2022	ITS Cup, Czech Republic	W60	Clay	(Romania) Ilona Georgiana Ghioroaie	(Burundi) Sada Nahimana (Italy) Giulia Gatto-Monticone	1–6, 6–1, [5–10]
Win	30–20	Aug 2022	ITF Brașov, Romania	W25	Clay	(Romania) Ilona Georgiana Ghioroaie	(Romania) Cristina Dinu (Romania) Andreea Roșca	7–5, 6–3
Win	31–20	Oct 2022	ITF Pula, Italy	W25	Clay	Amina Anshba	(Italy) Angelica Moratelli (Italy) Lisa Pigato	6–3, 6–1
Loss	31–21	Oct 2022	Trnava Indoor, Slovakia	W25	Hard (i)	(China) Lu Jiajing	(Croatia) Lea Bošković (Poland) Weronika Falkowska	6–7^{(7)}, 6–2, [6–10]
Win	32–21	Aug 2023	ITF Bistrita, Romania	W25	Clay	(Romania) Ilona Georgiana Ghioroaie	(Czech Republic) Linda Ševčíková (Turkey) İlay Yörük	7–6^{(6)}, 6–2
Win	33–21	Dec 2023	ITF Valencia, Spain	W15	Hard	(Portugal) Inês Murta	(Germany) Laura Böhner (Bulgaria) Ani Vangelova	7–6^{(0)}, 6–2
Win	34–21	Mar 2024	ITF Sabadell, Spain	W15	Clay	(Germany) Joëlle Steur	(Spain) Yvonne Cavallé Reimers (Sweden) Caijsa Hennemann	2–6, 7–6^{(5)}, [10–7]
Win	35–21	Mar 2025	ITF Alaminos, Cyprus	W15	Clay	(Czech Republic) Linda Ševčíková	(Uzbekistan) Vlada Ekshibarova (Ukraine) Anastasiia Firman	7–5, 6–3
Win	36–21	Aug 2026	ITF Bistrița, Romania	W35	Clay	(Hungary) Adrienn Nagy	(Romania) Patricia Georgiana Goina (Romania) Simona Ogescu	6–1, 6–3
