= Ilona Georgiana Ghioroaie =

Romanian tennis player (born 1998)

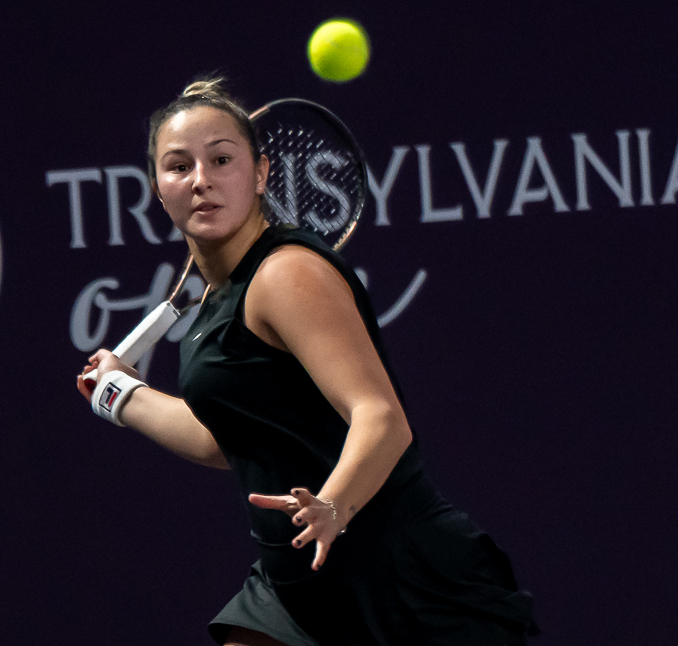
- Ghioroaie at the 2024 Transylvania Open
- Country (sports): Romania
- Born: 28 March 1998 (age 28) Romania
- Plays: Right (two-handed backhand)
- Prize money: $117,795

Singles
- Career record: 268–142
- Career titles: 16 ITF
- Highest ranking: No. 341 (31 October 2022)

Doubles
- Career record: 132–78
- Career titles: 13 ITF
- Highest ranking: No. 252 (22 May 2023)

Ilona Georgiana Ghioroaie (born 28 March 1998) is a Romanian former tennis player.

Ghioroaie has a career-high singles ranking by the WTA of 341, reached on 31 October 2022. Her best doubles ranking of world No. 252, she achieved on 22 May 2023.

Ghioroaie has won 16 singles titles and 13 doubles titles on the ITF Circuit. She made her WTA Tour main-draw debut at the 2023 Transylvania Open, going through qualifying, but losing in the first round to Anna-Lena Friedsam in straight sets.

== ITF Circuit finals ==
=== Singles: 18 (16 titles, 2 runner-ups) ===
Legend
$25,000 tournaments
$10/15,000 tournaments

Result	W–L	Date	Tournament	Tier	Surface	Opponent	Score
Win	1–0	Oct 2016	ITF Chișinău, Moldova	10k	Clay	(Ukraine) Veronika Kapshay	6–4, 6–2
Win	2–0	Oct 2016	ITF Chișinău, Moldova	10k	Clay	(Moldova) Adriana Sosnovschi	6–3, 6–0
Win	3–0	Aug 2017	ITF Târgu Jiu, Romania	15k	Clay	(Slovakia) Tereza Mihalíková	6–3, 3–6, 7–6^{(7)}
Loss	3–1	Oct 2017	ITF Antalya, Turkey	15k	Clay	(Turkey) İpek Öz	3–6, 2–6
Win	4–1	Oct 2017	ITF Antalya, Turkey	15k	Clay	(Czech Republic) Gabriela Horáčková	6–3, 6–0
Loss	4–2	Feb 2018	ITF Antalya, Turkey	15k	Clay	(Romania) Oana Georgeta Simion	6–2, 2–6, 5–7
Win	5–2	Mar 2018	ITF Antalya, Turkey	15k	Clay	(Russia) Amina Anshba	7–6^{(1)}, 3–6, 6–4
Win	6–2	May 2018	ITF Sajur, Israel	15k	Hard	(Turkey) Melis Sezer	6–2, 6–2
Win	7–2	Oct 2018	ITF Monastir, Tunisia	15k	Hard	(Belgium) Magali Kempen	6–3, 4–1 ret.
Win	8–2	Oct 2018	ITF Monastir, Tunisia	15k	Hard	(Czech Republic) Nikola Tomanová	6–3, 4–6, 6–1
Win	9–2	Nov 2018	ITF Monastir, Tunisia	15k	Hard	(Sweden) Linnéa Malmqvist	7–6^{(3)}, 6–1
Win	10–2	Nov 2018	ITF Monastir, Tunisia	15k	Hard	(United States) Chiara Scholl	6–1, 6–3
Win	11–2	Dec 2019	ITF Monastir, Tunisia	W15	Hard	(Russia) Anastasia Pribylova	6–1, 6–4
Win	12–2	Feb 2020	ITF Monastir, Tunisia	W15	Hard	(Russia) Maria Timofeeva	7–5, 6–1
Win	13–2	Jun 2021	ITF Antalya, Turkey	W15	Clay	(Italy) Federica Bilardo	7–5, 6–2
Win	14–2	Jul 2021	ITF Antalya, Turkey	W15	Clay	(Slovenia) Živa Falkner	6–4, 6–3
Win	15–2	Dec 2021	ITF Monastir, Tunisia	W15	Hard	(Hong Kong) Adithya Karunaratne	6–7^{(5)}, 6–3, 6–4
Win	16–2	Sep 2023	ITF Varna, Bulgaria	W25	Clay	Valeriia Olianovskaia	6–4, 6–2

=== Doubles: 20 (13 titles, 7 runner-ups) ===
Legend
W60 tournaments
W25 tournaments
W10/15 tournaments

Result	No.	Date	Tournament	Tier	Surface	Partner	Opponents	Score
Win	1–0	Nov 2016	ITF Hammamet, Tunisia	10k	Clay	(Romania) Diana Enache	(Brazil) Carolina Alves (Bolivia) Noelia Zeballos	3–6, 6–1, [10–8]
Win	2–0	Mar 2017	ITF Antalya, Turkey	15k	Clay	(Romania) Georgia Crăciun	(Russia) Anastasia Frolova (Russia) Alena Tarasova	6–1, 6–4
Win	3–0	May 2017	ITF Antalya, Turkey	15k	Clay	(Romania) Georgia Crăciun	(Croatia) Mariana Dražić (Denmark) Emilie Francati	6–2, 6–4
Win	4–0	Jun 2017	ITF Antalya, Turkey	15k	Clay	(Romania) Georgia Crăciun	(Croatia) Ena Kajević (Bolivia) Noelia Zeballos	w/o
Win	5–0	Jun 2017	ITF Curtea de Argeș, Romania	15k	Clay	(Romania) Georgia Crăciun	(Romania) Camelia Hristea (Romania) Gabriela Nicole Tătăruș	6–3, 7–5
Loss	5–1	Oct 2017	ITF Antalya, Turkey	15k	Clay	(Romania) Cristina Adamescu	(Slovakia) Viktória Morvayová (Slovenia) Nika Radišić	4–6, 4–6
Loss	5–2	Mar 2018	ITF Antalya, Turkey	15k	Clay	(France) Victoria Muntean	(Sweden) Fanny Östlund (Romania) Andreea Roșca	3–6, 6–4, [7–10]
Win	6–2	Oct 2018	ITF Monastir, Tunisia	15k	Hard	(Italy) Miriana Tona	(Netherlands) Dominique Karregat (Netherlands) Annick Melgers	6–2, 6–2
Loss	6–3	Feb 2020	ITF Monastir, Tunisia	W15	Hard	(Russia) Anastasia Pribylova	(France) Mylène Halemai (France) Manon Léonard	6–1, 3–6, [6–10]
Win	7–3	Feb 2021	ITF Monastir, Tunisia	W15	Hard	(Romania) Karola Patricia Bejenaru	(Poland) Weronika Falkowska (Slovakia) Viktória Morvayová	1–6, 7–6^{(7)}, [12–10]
Win	8–3	Mar 2021	ITF Monastir, Tunisia	W15	Hard	(Romania) Oana Gavrilă	(United Kingdom) Anna Popescu (United States) Chiara Scholl	7–5, 6–4
Win	9–3	Apr 2021	ITF Monastir, Tunisia	W15	Hard	(Romania) Karola Patricia Bejenaru	(Spain) Rebeka Masarova (Latvia) Daniela Vismane	6–2, 6–0
Loss	9–4	Jul 2022	ITF Tarvisio, Italy	W25	Clay	(Romania) Oana Georgeta Simion	(Croatia) Lea Bošković (Slovenia) Veronika Erjavec	1–6, 7–6^{(5)}, [7–10]
Loss	9–5	Jul 2022	ITS Cup Olomouc, Czech Republic	W60	Clay	(Romania) Oana Georgeta Simion	(Burundi) Sada Nahimana (Italy) Giulia Gatto-Monticone	1–6, 6–1, [5–10]
Win	10–5	Aug 2022	ITF Brașov, Romania	W25	Clay	(Romania) Oana Georgeta Simion	(Romania) Cristina Dinu (Romania) Andreea Roșca	7–5, 6–3
Win	11–5	Aug 2022	ITF Mogyoród, Hungary	W25	Clay	(Hungary) Amarissa Tóth	(France) Carole Monnet (France) Marine Partaud	7–5, 6–0
Loss	11–6	Oct 2022	ITF Sozopol, Bulgaria	W25	Hard	(Hungary) Rebeka Stolmár	(Russia) Irina Khromacheva (Estonia) Elena Malõgina	6–7^{(3)}, 2–6
Win	12–6	Aug 2023	ITF Osijek, Croatia	W25	Clay	(Hungary) Amarissa Tóth	(Germany) Luisa Meyer auf der Heide (Greece) Dimitra Pavlou	6–2, 6–4
Win	13–6	Aug 2023	ITF Bistrita, Romania	W25	Clay	(Romania) Oana Georgeta Simion	(Czech Republic) Linda Ševčíková (Turkey) İlay Yörük	7–6^{(6)}, 6–2
Loss	13–7	Sep 2023	ITF Slobozia, Romania	W25	Hard	(Romania) Andreea Prisăcariu	(Romania) Oana Gavrilă (Ukraine) Valeriya Strakhova	2–6, 5–7
