= Giulia Gatto-Monticone =

Italian tennis player (born 1987)

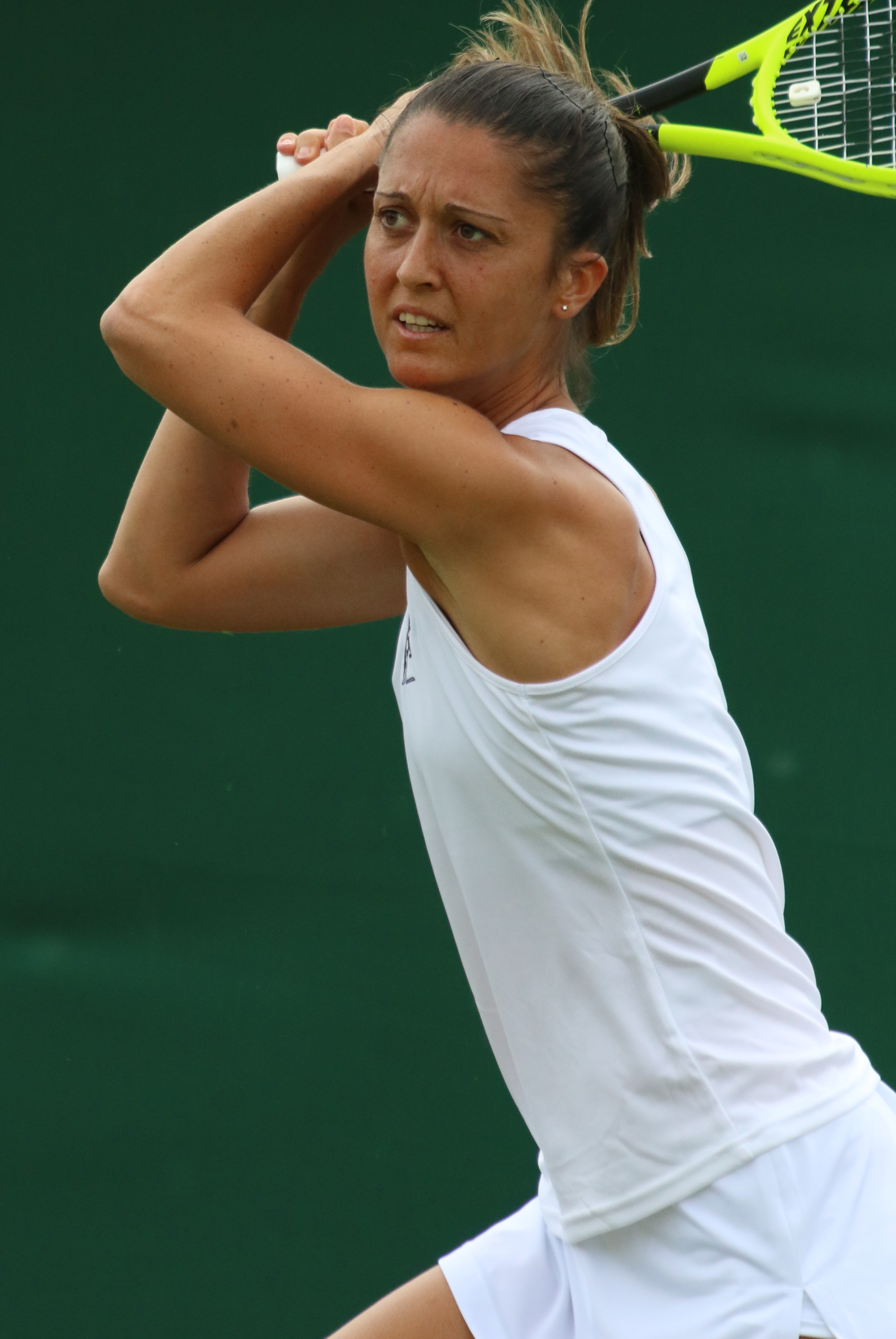
- Gatto Monticone at the 2019 Wimbledon
- Country (sports): Italy
- Born: 18 November 1987 (age 38) Turin, Italy
- Height: 1.77 m (5 ft 10 in)
- Turned pro: 2005
- Retired: 2023
- Plays: Right (two-handed backhand)
- Prize money: US$ 665,570

Singles
- Career record: 564–430
- Career titles: 11 ITF
- Highest ranking: No. 148 (3 February 2020)

Grand Slam singles results
- Australian Open: Q3 (2020)
- French Open: 1R (2019)
- Wimbledon: 1R (2019)
- US Open: Q1 (2011, 2014, 2019, 2021)

Doubles
- Career record: 202–150
- Career titles: 26 ITF
- Highest ranking: No. 200 (27 October 2014)

Giulia Gatto-Monticone (born 18 November 1987) is an Italian former tennis player.

In February 2020, she reached her highest singles ranking of world No. 148, while her best WTA doubles ranking is 200, achieved in October 2014.

Gatto-Monticone has won eleven singles titles and 26 doubles titles on the ITF Circuit.

She has never lost a match in Fed Cup (2–0 record in doubles), contributing to have Italy win the 2020 Billie Jean King Cup Europe/Africa Zone Group I – Pool B (Tallinn).

In November 2023, Gatto-Monticone retired from tennis.

== Personal life and background ==
Gatto-Monticone stated that her tennis idols are Roger Federer and Kimiko Date. Her favorite shot is forehand and favorite surface to play on is grass.

== Career highlights ==
At the age of 31, in May 2019, she made her major main-draw debut at Roland Garros.

She also made her main-draw debut at the 2019 Wimbledon Championships after qualifying.

In September 2020, Gatto-Monticone reached her first final on the WTA Challenger Tour. Partnering with Nadia Podoroska, she lost to Lidziya Marozava and Andreea Mitu in straight sets.

== Grand Slam singles performance timeline ==
Key
W	F	SF	QF	#R	RR	Q#	DNQ	A	NH

(W) winner; (F) finalist; (SF) semifinalist; (QF) quarterfinalist; (#R) rounds 4, 3, 2, 1; (RR) round-robin stage; (Q#) qualification round; (DNQ) did not qualify; (A) absent; (NH) not held; (SR) strike rate (events won / competed); (W–L) win–loss record.
To avoid confusion and double counting, these charts are updated at the conclusion of a tournament or when the player's participation has ended.

== WTA 125 finals ==
=== Doubles: 1 (runner-up) ===
Result	Date	Tournament	Surface	Partner	Opponents	Score
Loss	Sep 2020	Sparta Prague Open, Czech Republic	Clay	(Argentina) Nadia Podoroska	(Belarus) Lidziya Marozava (Romania) Andreea Mitu	4–6, 4–6

== ITF Circuit finals ==
Legend
$50/60,000 tournaments
$25,000 tournaments
$10/15,000 tournaments

=== Singles: 30 (11 titles, 19 runner-ups) ===
Result	W–L	Date	Tournament	Tier	Surface	Opponent	Score
Loss	0–1	Oct 2005	ITF Castel Gandolfo, Italy	10,000	Clay	(Poland) Anna Korzeniak	3–6, 0–6
Loss	0–2	Aug 2006	ITF Jesi, Italy	10,000	Hard	(Russia) Regina Kulikova	3–6, 4–6
Loss	0–3	Jul 2007	ITF Imola, Italy	10,000	Hard	(Italy) Valentina Sassi	6–7^{(1)}, 2–6
Loss	0–4	Jun 2008	ITF Torino, Italy	10,000	Clay	(Kyrgyzstan) Ksenia Palkina	0–6, 4–6
Win	1–4	Jul 2008	ITF Imola, Italy	10,000	Carpet	(Italy) Julia Mayr	6–2, 6–1
Loss	1–5	Aug 2008	ITF Wahlstedt, Germany	10,000	Clay	(Switzerland) Romina Oprandi	3–6, 0–6
Loss	1–6	Oct 2008	ITF Sevilla, Spain	10,000	Clay	(Netherlands) Michelle Gerards	3–6, 2–6
Win	2–6	Oct 2008	ITF Oristano, Italy	10,000	Hard	(Italy) Silvia Disderi	6–2, 6–2
Win	3–6	May 2009	ITF Piteşti, Romania	10,000	Clay	(Bulgaria) Tanya Germanlieva	6–3, 6–3
Win	4–6	Aug 2009	ITF Arezzo, Italy	10,000	Clay	(South Africa) Chanel Simmonds	7–5, 6–3
Loss	4–7	Feb 2010	ITF Madrid, Spain	10,000	Clay	(Spain) María Teresa Torró Flor	5–7, 6–3, 4–6
Loss	4–8	Mar 2010	ITF Amiens, France	10,000	Clay (i)	(France) Claire de Gubernatis	3–6, 3–6
Loss	4–9	Mar 2010	ITF Gonesse, France	10,000	Clay (i)	(France) Iryna Brémond	0–6, 3–6
Loss	4–10	Mar 2011	ITF Bath, United Kingdom	10,000	Hard (i)	(Russia) Marta Sirotkina	w/o
Loss	4–11	May 2011	Internazionali di Brescia, Italy	25,000	Clay	(Ukraine) Irina Buryachok	7–6^{(5)}, 2–6, 2–6
Win	5–11	Jul 2011	ITF Imola, Italy	25,000	Carpet	(Italy) Federica Quercia	6–1, 6–3
Loss	5–12	Apr 2012	ITF Torrent, Spain	10,000	Clay	(Spain) Andrea Lázaro García	0–6, 6–3, 1–4 ret.
Loss	5–13	Jul 2015	Bella Cup, Poland	25,000	Clay	(Slovakia) Kristína Kučová	6–4, 1–6, 4–6
Loss	5–14	Aug 2016	ITF Valladolid, Spain	10,000	Hard	(Spain) Eva Guerrero Álvarez	6–4, 4–6, 4–6
Win	6–14	Aug 2016	ITF Galați, Romania	10,000	Clay	(Romania) Oana Georgeta Simion	6–3, 6–4
Win	7–14	Oct 2016	ITF Telde, Spain	10,000	Clay	(Switzerland) Leonie Küng	2–6, 6–1, 6–3
Loss	7–15	Mar 2017	ITF Heraklion, Greece	15,000	Clay	(Serbia) Dejana Radanović	5–7, 3–6
Win	8–15	Apr 2017	ITF Pula, Italy	25,000	Clay	(Romania) Irina Bara	3–6, 7–5, 6–4
Loss	8–16	May 2017	ITF Qujing, China	25,000	Hard	(China) Gao Xinyu	1–6, 6–3, 3–6
Loss	8–17	Jun 2018	ITF Óbidos, Portugal	25,000	Carpet	(Serbia) Dejana Radanović	2–6, 1–6
Loss	8–18	Sep 2018	ITF Dobrich, Bulgaria	25,000	Clay	(Germany) Caroline Werner	4–6, 6–3, 5–7
Win	9–18	Sep 2018	ITF Óbidos, Portugal	25,000	Carpet	(Belgium) Greet Minnen	7–5, 6–4
Win	10–18	Mar 2019	ITF Kofu, Japan	25,000	Hard	(Belgium) Lara Salden	6–2, 6–1
Win	11–18	Nov 2019	ITF Solarino, Italy	25,000	Carpet	(Croatia) Jana Fett	2–6, 6–3, 7–5
Loss	11–19	Oct 2021	ITF Budapest, Hungary	25,000	Clay	(Hungary) Réka Luca Jani	1–6, 4–6

=== Doubles: 38 (26 titles, 12 runner-ups) ===
Result	W–L	Date	Tournament	Tier	Surface	Partner	Opponents	Score
Win	1–0	May 2006	ITF Casale Monferrato, Italy	10,000	Clay	(Belarus) Darya Kustova	(Russia) Anastasia Pavlyuchenkova (Russia) Irina Smirnova	6–2, 6–2
Loss	1–1	Jul 2006	International Country Cuneo, Italy	50,000	Clay	(Belarus) Darya Kustova	(Italy) Sara Errani (Italy) Karin Knapp	3–6, 6–7^{(5)}
Win	2–1	Mar 2007	ITF Rome, Italy	10,000	Clay	(Belarus) Darya Kustova	(Netherlands) Danielle Harmsen (Austria) Marlena Metzinger	6–4, 6–1
Win	3–1	Mar 2007	ITF Rome, Italy	10,000	Clay	(Belarus) Darya Kustova	(Romania) Alexandra Dulgheru (Serbia) Vojislava Lukić	5–7, 6–1, 6–2
Win	4–1	Mar 2007	ITF Foggia, Italy	10,000	Clay	(Italy) Stefania Chieppa	(Switzerland) Lisa Sabino (Austria) Stefanie Haidner	6–1, 6–3
Loss	4–2	Jul 2007	ITF Cremona, Italy	10,000	Clay	(Switzerland) Lisa Sabino	(Italy) Benedetta Davato (Italy) Elena Pioppo	3–6, 2–6
Loss	4–3	Sep 2007	ITF Casale Monferrato, Italy	10,000	Clay	(Italy) Stefania Chieppa	(France) Émilie Bacquet (France) Samantha Schoeffel	2–6, 2–6
Win	5–3	Oct 2007	ITF Castel Gandolfo, Italy	10,000	Clay	(Italy) Stefania Chieppa	(Austria) Stefanie Haidner (Switzerland) Amra Sadiković	2–3 ret.
Win	6–3	Oct 2007	ITF Sevilla, Spain	10,000	Clay	(Italy) Federica Quercia	(Spain) Melissa Cabrera-Handt (Spain) Carolina Gago Fuentes	6–7^{(5)}, 6–4, [11–8]
Win	7–3	Feb 2008	ITF Arezzo, Italy	10,000	Clay	(Italy) Federica Quercia	(Ukraine) Tetyana Arefyeva (Belgium) Aude Vermoezen	7–5, 6–1
Win	8–3	Mar 2008	ITF Sabadell, Spain	10,000	Clay	(Italy) Federica Quercia	(Italy) Elisa Balsamo (Italy) Valentina Sulpizio	6–2, 6–0
Loss	8–4	Mar 2008	ITF Rome, Italy	10,000	Clay	(Italy) Federica Quercia	(Poland) Magdalena Kiszczyńska (Belarus) Ksenia Milevskaya	0–6, 4–6
Loss	8–5	Apr 2008	ITF Fuerteventura, Spain	10,000	Carpet	(Italy) Benedetta Davato	(United Kingdom) Jade Curtis (Spain) Irene Rehberger Bescos	3–6, 6–7^{(6)}
Loss	8–6	Jun 2008	ITF Torino, Italy	10,000	Clay	(Italy) Stefania Chieppa	(Belarus) Tatsiana Kapshai (Russia) Alexandra Razumova	7–6^{(4)}, 2–6, [8–10]
Loss	8–7	Aug 2008	ITF Pesaro, Italy	10,000	Clay	(Italy) Stefania Chieppa	(Italy) Benedetta Davato (Switzerland) Lisa Sabino	2–6, 6–7
Loss	8–8	Oct 2008	ITF Sevilla, Spain	10,000	Clay	(Italy) Federica Quercia	(Netherlands) Michelle Gerards (Netherlands) Claire Lablans	2–6, 3–6
Win	9–8	Oct 2008	ITF Oristano, Italy	10,000	Hard	(Italy) Silvia Disderi	(Italy) Alice Balducci (Italy) Elisa Salis	6–0, 6–2
Loss	9–9	Feb 2009	ITF Albufeira, Portugal	10,000	Hard	(Italy) Federica Quercia	(Czech Republic) Lucie Kriegsmannová (Czech Republic) Darina Sedenková	0–6, 2–6
Win	10–9	May 2009	ITF Caserta, Italy	10,000	Clay	(Italy) Stefania Chieppa	(Italy) Martina di Giuseppe (Romania) Andreea Văideanu	6–1, 6–4
Win	11–9	May 2009	ITF Arezzo, Italy	10,000	Clay	(Italy) Federica Quercia	(Italy) Stefania Chieppa (Italy) Valentina Sulpizio	6–3, 4–6, [10–2]
Win	12–9	Oct 2009	ITF Settimo San Pietro, Italy	10,000	Clay	(Italy) Federica Quercia	(Italy) Giulia Gasparri (Italy) Elisa Salis	6–2, 7–5
Win	13–9	Oct 2009	ITF Sant Cugat del Vallès, Spain	10,000	Clay	(Italy) Federica Quercia	(Russia) Margarita Lazareva (Ukraine) Anastasiya Lytovchenko	6–2, 6–2
Win	14–9	Feb 2010	ITF Madrid, Spain	10,000	Hard	(Italy) Federica Quercia	(Italy) Benedetta Davato (Spain) Inés Ferrer Suárez	5–7, 6–4, [10–6]
Loss	14–10	Apr 2010	ITF Bari, Italy	25,000	Clay	(Italy) Federica Quercia	(Russia) Anastasia Pivovarova (Ukraine) Irina Buryachok	7–6^{(3)}, 4–6, [4–10]
Win	15–10	Jul 2010	ITF Les Contamines-Montjoie, France	25,000	Hard	(Italy) Federica Quercia	(France) Constance Sibille (France) Claire Feuerstein	7–5, 7–5
Win	16–10	Mar 2011	ITF Bath, United Kingdom	10,000	Hard (i)	(Italy) Anastasia Grymalska	(Finland) Emma Laine (United Kingdom) Tara Moore	6–4, 2–6, [10–6]
Win	17–10	May 2011	ITF Casarano, Italy	10,000	Clay	(Italy) Federica Quercia	(Italy) Benedetta Davato (Italy) Federica Grazioso	7–5, 2–6, 6–4
Win	18–10	Jul 2011	ITF Imola, Italy	25,000	Carpet	(Italy) Federica Quercia	(Colombia) Yuliana Lizarazo (Germany) Scarlett Werner	w/o
Win	19–10	Feb 2012	ITF Mâcon, France	10,000	Hard (i)	(Slovakia) Michaela Hončová	(Netherlands) Kim Kilsdonk (Netherlands) Nicolette van Uitert	6–4, 1–6, [10–5]
Win	20–10	Apr 2013	ITF Dijon, France	15,000	Hard (i)	(Italy) Nicole Clerico	(Russia) Marina Shamayko (Bulgaria) Elitsa Kostova	6–4, 6–2
Loss	20–11	Apr 2013	Chiasso Open, Switzerland	25,000	Clay	(Italy) Nicole Clerico	(Belarus) Aliaksandra Sasnovich (Latvia) Diāna Marcinkēviča	7–6^{(2)}, 4–6, [7–10]
Win	21–11	Feb 2014	ITF Beinasco, Italy	25,000	Clay (i)	(Italy) Nicole Clerico	(United Kingdom) Anna Smith (United Kingdom) Jocelyn Rae	6–1, 5–7, [13–11]
Win	22–11	Sep 2014	Open de Saint-Malo, France	50,000	Clay	(Italy) Anastasia Grymalska	(Argentina) Tatiana Búa (Spain) Beatriz García Vidagany	6–3, 6–1
Loss	22–12	Apr 2015	Chiasso Open, Switzerland	25,000	Clay	(Italy) Alice Matteucci	(Romania) Diana Buzean (Hungary) Réka Luca Jani	2–6, 5–7
Win	23–12	Jun 2018	ITF Óbidos, Portugal	25,000	Carpet	(Italy) Giorgia Marchetti	(Germany) Caroline Werner (Spain) Nuria Párrizas Díaz	6–1, 6–1
Win	24–12	Jan 2019	Playford International, Australia	25,000	Hard	(Italy) Anastasia Grymalska	(Australia) Amber Marshall (Switzerland) Lulu Sun	6–2, 6–3
Win	25–12	May 2019	Open Saint-Gaudens, France	60,000	Clay	(Italy) Martina di Giuseppe	(Russia) Anna Kalinskaya (Russia) Sofya Lansere	6–1, 6–1
Win	26–12	Jul 2022	ITS Cup, Czech Republic	60,000	Clay	(Burundi) Sada Nahimana	(Romania) Ilona Georgiana Ghioroaie (Romania) Oana Georgeta Simion	6–1, 1–6, [10–5]
