= ITS Cup =

- 2024 ITS Cup

ITF Women's Tour
- Event name: ITS Cup
- Location: Olomouc, Czech Republic
- Venue: ITS Tennis Centre
- Category: ITF Women's Circuit
- Surface: Clay
- Draw: 32S/32Q/16D
- Prize money: $60,000
- Website: official website

The ITS Cup is a tournament for professional female tennis players played on outdoor clay courts. The event is classified as a $60,000 ITF Women's Circuit tournament and has been held in Olomouc, Czech Republic, since 2009. The event had previously been a $100,000 tournament in 2012 and 2013. In 2019, it was downgraded to a $25,000 event.

== Past finals ==
=== Singles ===
Year	Champion	Runner-up	Score
2026	(Czech Republic) Julie Štruplová	(Slovakia) Radka Zelníčková	6–3, 6–4
2025	(Mexico) Ana Sofía Sánchez	(Romania) Gabriela Lee	7–5, 5–7, 6–3
2024	(Hungary) Anna Bondár	(South Korea) Jang Su-jeong	6–3, 7–6^{(7–4)}
2023	(Latvia) Darja Semeņistaja	(Croatia) Lea Bošković	6–7^{(6–8)}, 6–3, 6–1
2022	(Czech Republic) Sára Bejlek	(North Macedonia) Lina Gjorcheska	6–2, 7–6^{(7–0)}
2021	(Czech Republic) Sára Bejlek	(Argentina) Paula Ormaechea	6–0, 6–0
2020	Tournament cancelled due to the COVID-19 pandemic		
2019	(Czech Republic) Jesika Malečková	(Turkey) İpek Soylu	6–3, 6–4
2018	(France) Fiona Ferro	(Czech Republic) Karolína Muchová	6–4, 6–4
2017	(United States) Bernarda Pera	(Czech Republic) Kristýna Plíšková	7–5, 4–6, 6–3
2016	(Russia) Elizaveta Kulichkova	(Russia) Ekaterina Alexandrova	4–6, 6–2, 6–1
2015	(Czech Republic) Barbora Krejčíková	(Czech Republic) Petra Cetkovská	3–6, 6–4, 7–6^{(7–5)}
2014	(Czech Republic) Petra Cetkovská	(Czech Republic) Denisa Allertová	3–6, 6–1, 6–4
2013	(Slovenia) Polona Hercog	(Poland) Katarzyna Piter	6–0, 6–3
2012	(Spain) María Teresa Torró Flor	(Romania) Alexandra Cadanțu	6–2, 6–3
2011	(Italy) Nastassja Burnett	(Czech Republic) Eva Birnerová	6–1, 6–3
2010	(Austria) Patricia Mayr	(Italy) Julia Mayr	6–2, 6–4
2009	(Czech Republic) Lucie Kriegsmannová	(Czech Republic) Iveta Gerlová	6–7^{(5–7)}, 6–2, 6–2

=== Doubles ===
Year	Champions	Runners-up	Score
2026	(Hungary) Adrienn Nagy (Czech Republic) Ivana Šebestová	(Finland) Laura Hietaranta (Slovakia) Nina Vargová	3–6, 7–6^{(8–6)}, [10–5]
2025	(Slovenia) Dalila Jakupović (Slovenia) Nika Radišić	(India) Rutuja Bhosale (China) Zheng Wushuang	6–4, 6–1
2024	Amina Anshba (Greece) Valentini Grammatikopoulou	(United States) Jessie Aney (Germany) Lena Papadakis	6–2, 6–4
2023	(Czech Republic) Magdaléna Smékalová (Czech Republic) Tereza Valentová	(Kazakhstan) Zhibek Kulambayeva (Latvia) Darja Semeņistaja	6–2, 6–2
2022	(Italy) Giulia Gatto-Monticone (Burundi) Sada Nahimana	(Romania) Ilona Georgiana Ghioroaie (Romania) Oana Georgeta Simion	6–1, 1–6, [10–5]
2021	(United States) Jessie Aney (Czech Republic) Anna Sisková	(Chile) Bárbara Gatica (Brazil) Rebeca Pereira	6–1, 6–0
2020	Tournament cancelled due to the COVID-19 pandemic		
2019	(Czech Republic) Anastasia Dețiuc (Czech Republic) Johana Marková	(Czech Republic) Jesika Malečková (Slovakia) Chantal Škamlová	6–3, 4–6, [11–9]
2018	(Czech Republic) Petra Krejsová (Czech Republic) Jesika Malečková	(Czech Republic) Lucie Hradecká (Netherlands) Michaëlla Krajicek	6–2, 6–1
2017	(France) Amandine Hesse (Mexico) Victoria Rodríguez	(Slovakia) Michaela Hončová (Romania) Raluca Georgiana Șerban	3–6, 6–2, [10–6]
2016	(Bosnia and Herzegovina) Ema Burgić Bucko (Bosnia and Herzegovina) Jasmina Tinjić	(Philippines) Katharina Lehnert (Ukraine) Anastasiya Shoshyna	7–5, 6–3
2015	(Czech Republic) Lenka Kunčíková (Czech Republic) Karolína Stuchlá	(Netherlands) Cindy Burger (Czech Republic) Kateřina Vaňková	1–6, 6–4, [12–10]
2014	(Czech Republic) Petra Cetkovská (Czech Republic) Renata Voráčová	(Czech Republic) Barbora Krejčíková (Serbia) Aleksandra Krunić	6–2, 4–6, [10–7]
2013	(Czech Republic) Renata Voráčová (Czech Republic) Barbora Záhlavová-Strýcová	(Czech Republic) Martina Borecká (Czech Republic) Tereza Malíková	6–3, 6–4
2012	(Spain) Inés Ferrer Suárez (Netherlands) Richèl Hogenkamp	(Ukraine) Yuliya Beygelzimer (Czech Republic) Renata Voráčová	6–2, 7–6^{(7–4)}
2011	(Netherlands) Michaëlla Krajicek (Czech Republic) Renata Voráčová	(Ukraine) Yuliya Beygelzimer (Romania) Elena Bogdan	7–5, 6–4
2010	(Austria) Sandra Klemenschits (Austria) Patricia Mayr	(Czech Republic) Iveta Gerlová (Czech Republic) Lucie Kriegsmannová	6–3, 6–1
2009	(Czech Republic) Iveta Gerlová (Czech Republic) Darina Šeděnková	(Czech Republic) Martina Borecká (Czech Republic) Martina Kubičíková	6–4, 6–2
