= 2018 ITF Women's Circuit (July–September) =

2018 women's tennis tournaments

The 2018 ITF Women's Circuit is the 2018 edition of the second tier tour for women's professional tennis. It is organised by the International Tennis Federation and is a tier below the WTA Tour. The ITF Women's Circuit includes tournaments with prize money ranging from $15,000 up to $100,000.

== Key ==
Category
$100,000 tournaments
$80,000 tournaments
$60,000 tournaments
$25,000 tournaments
$15,000 tournaments

== Month ==
=== July ===
Week of	Tournament	Winner	Runners-up	Semifinalists	Quarterfinalists
July 2	Torneo Internazionale Femminile Antico Tiro a Volo; Rome, Italy; Clay $60,000+H; Singles – Doubles	(Ukraine) Dayana Yastremska; 6–1, 6–0	(Russia) Anastasia Potapova	(Switzerland) Jil Teichmann (Spain) Sílvia Soler Espinosa	(Kazakhstan) Elena Rybakina (Russia) Sofya Zhuk (Italy) Jessica Pieri (Czech Republic) Anastasia Zarycká
July 2	Torneo Internazionale Femminile Antico Tiro a Volo; Rome, Italy; Clay $60,000+H; Singles – Doubles	(Brazil) Laura Pigossi (Mexico) Renata Zarazúa; 6–1, 4–6, [13–11]	(Italy) Anastasia Grymalska (Italy) Giorgia Marchetti	(Switzerland) Jil Teichmann (Spain) Sílvia Soler Espinosa	(Kazakhstan) Elena Rybakina (Russia) Sofya Zhuk (Italy) Jessica Pieri (Czech Republic) Anastasia Zarycká
July 2	Naiman, China; Hard $25,000; Singles and doubles draws	(China) Zhang Yuxuan; 6–3, 6–2	(China) Xun Fangying	(China) Gai Ao (India) Karman Thandi	(China) Cao Siqi (India) Rutuja Bhosale (China) Wang Meiling (Kazakhstan) Gozal Ainitdinova
July 2	Naiman, China; Hard $25,000; Singles and doubles draws	(China) Kang Jiaqi (South Korea) Kim Na-ri; 6–7^{(4–7)}, 6–4, [10–5]	(China) Jiang Xinyu (China) Tang Qianhui	(China) Gai Ao (India) Karman Thandi	(China) Cao Siqi (India) Rutuja Bhosale (China) Wang Meiling (Kazakhstan) Gozal Ainitdinova
July 2	Open Porte du Hainaut; Denain, France; Clay $25,000; Singles and doubles draws	(Ukraine) Valeriya Strakhova; 3–6, 7–6^{(7–5)}, 6–0	(United States) Allie Kiick	(Greece) Valentini Grammatikopoulou (Spain) Aliona Bolsova Zadoinov	(Kazakhstan) Anna Danilina (France) Sara Cakarevic (Japan) Mari Osaka (Japan) Ayano Shimizu
July 2	Open Porte du Hainaut; Denain, France; Clay $25,000; Singles and doubles draws	(Japan) Momoko Kobori (Japan) Ayano Shimizu; 0–6, 7–5, [10–7]	(Netherlands) Quirine Lemoine (Netherlands) Eva Wacanno	(Greece) Valentini Grammatikopoulou (Spain) Aliona Bolsova Zadoinov	(Kazakhstan) Anna Danilina (France) Sara Cakarevic (Japan) Mari Osaka (Japan) Ayano Shimizu
July 2	Aschaffenburg, Germany; Clay $25,000; Singles and doubles draws	(Germany) Anna Zaja; 6–4, 7–5	(Germany) Katharina Hobgarski	(United States) Elizabeth Halbauer (Turkey) Başak Eraydın	(Czech Republic) Anastasia Dețiuc (Bulgaria) Julia Terziyska (Hungary) Anna Bondár (Belgium) Marie Benoît
July 2	Aschaffenburg, Germany; Clay $25,000; Singles and doubles draws	(Russia) Polina Leykina (Bulgaria) Isabella Shinikova; 7–6^{(7–4)}, 7–5	(Finland) Emma Laine (United States) Chiara Scholl	(United States) Elizabeth Halbauer (Turkey) Başak Eraydın	(Czech Republic) Anastasia Dețiuc (Bulgaria) Julia Terziyska (Hungary) Anna Bondár (Belgium) Marie Benoît
July 2	The Hague, Netherlands; Clay $15,000; Singles and doubles draws	(Norway) Malene Helgø; 6–4, 4–6, 6–3	(Sweden) Ida Jarlskog	(Germany) Julyette Steur (Netherlands) Lexie Stevens	(Russia) Valentyna Ivakhnenko (Netherlands) Eva Vedder (Belgium) Justine Pysson (Netherlands) Merel Hoedt
July 2	The Hague, Netherlands; Clay $15,000; Singles and doubles draws	(United Kingdom) Emily Appleton (Sweden) Ida Jarlskog; 6–4, 6–0	(United States) Dasha Ivanova (Germany) Julyette Steur	(Germany) Julyette Steur (Netherlands) Lexie Stevens	(Russia) Valentyna Ivakhnenko (Netherlands) Eva Vedder (Belgium) Justine Pysson (Netherlands) Merel Hoedt
July 2	Corroios-Seixal, Portugal; Hard $15,000; Singles and doubles draws	(New Zealand) Paige Mary Hourigan; 6–4, 6–3	(Zimbabwe) Valeria Bhunu	(United States) Lauren Proctor (Oman) Fatma Al-Nabhani	(Hungary) Panna Udvardy (Cambodia) Andrea Ka (Australia) Seone Mendez (United Kingdom) Eden Silva
July 2	Corroios-Seixal, Portugal; Hard $15,000; Singles and doubles draws	(Cambodia) Andrea Ka (United Kingdom) Eden Silva; 3–6, 6–1, [10–5]	(Portugal) Francisca Jorge (Spain) María José Luque Moreno	(United States) Lauren Proctor (Oman) Fatma Al-Nabhani	(Hungary) Panna Udvardy (Cambodia) Andrea Ka (Australia) Seone Mendez (United Kingdom) Eden Silva
July 2	Focșani, Romania; Clay $15,000; Singles and doubles draws	(Romania) Andreea Mitu; 6–4, 6–4	(Romania) Oana Georgeta Simion	(Romania) Miriam Bianca Bulgaru (Romania) Irina Fetecău	(Romania) Alexandra Damaschin (Romania) Arina Gabriela Vasilescu (Argentina) Eugenia Ganga (Italy) Bianca Turati
July 2	Focșani, Romania; Clay $15,000; Singles and doubles draws	(Romania) Andreea Mitu (Romania) Oana Georgeta Simion; 4–6, 6–2, [10–6]	(Romania) Selma Ștefania Cadar (Russia) Anastasia Kharitonova	(Romania) Miriam Bianca Bulgaru (Romania) Irina Fetecău	(Romania) Alexandra Damaschin (Romania) Arina Gabriela Vasilescu (Argentina) Eugenia Ganga (Italy) Bianca Turati
July 2	Prokuplje, Serbia; Clay $15,000; Singles and doubles draws	(Czech Republic) Gabriela Pantůčková; 6–2, 2–6, 6–3	(Croatia) Lea Bošković	(Slovenia) Veronika Erjavec (Russia) Victoria Kan	(Serbia) Kristina Miletić (Australia) Jelena Stojanovic (Slovenia) Kristina Novak (Serbia) Jelena Lukić
July 2	Prokuplje, Serbia; Clay $15,000; Singles and doubles draws	(Croatia) Lea Bošković (Slovenia) Veronika Erjavec; 6–0, 3–6, [10–7]	(Serbia) Barbara Bonić (Australia) Jelena Stojanovic	(Slovenia) Veronika Erjavec (Russia) Victoria Kan	(Serbia) Kristina Miletić (Australia) Jelena Stojanovic (Slovenia) Kristina Novak (Serbia) Jelena Lukić
July 9	Grand Est Open 88; Contrexéville, France; Clay $100,000; Singles – Doubles	(Switzerland) Stefanie Vögele; 6–4, 6–2	(Spain) Sara Sorribes Tormo	(China) Zheng Saisai (Russia) Anna Kalinskaya	(Netherlands) Arantxa Rus (Germany) Mona Barthel (Switzerland) Patty Schnyder (Belgium) Ysaline Bonaventure
July 9	Grand Est Open 88; Contrexéville, France; Clay $100,000; Singles – Doubles	(Belgium) An-Sophie Mestach (China) Zheng Saisai; 3–6, 6–2, [10–7]	(India) Prarthana Thombare (Netherlands) Eva Wacanno	(China) Zheng Saisai (Russia) Anna Kalinskaya	(Netherlands) Arantxa Rus (Germany) Mona Barthel (Switzerland) Patty Schnyder (Belgium) Ysaline Bonaventure
July 9	Hungarian Pro Circuit Ladies Open; Budapest, Hungary; Clay $100,000; Singles – Doubles	(Slovakia) Viktória Kužmová; 6–3, 4–6, 6–1	(Russia) Ekaterina Alexandrova	(Slovakia) Anna Karolína Schmiedlová (Ukraine) Dayana Yastremska	(Russia) Alexandra Panova (Slovenia) Tamara Zidanšek (Tunisia) Ons Jabeur (Croatia) Tena Lukas
July 9	Hungarian Pro Circuit Ladies Open; Budapest, Hungary; Clay $100,000; Singles – Doubles	(Romania) Alexandra Cadanțu (Slovakia) Chantal Škamlová; 6–1, 6–3	(United States) Kaitlyn Christian (Mexico) Giuliana Olmos	(Slovakia) Anna Karolína Schmiedlová (Ukraine) Dayana Yastremska	(Russia) Alexandra Panova (Slovenia) Tamara Zidanšek (Tunisia) Ons Jabeur (Croatia) Tena Lukas
July 9	Reinert Open; Versmold, Germany; Clay $60,000; Singles – Doubles	(Serbia) Olga Danilović; 5–7, 6–1, 6–3	(Germany) Laura Siegemund	(Germany) Anna Zaja (Netherlands) Bibiane Schoofs	(Germany) Carina Witthöft (Turkey) Çağla Büyükakçay (Italy) Martina Di Giuseppe (Liechtenstein) Kathinka von Deichmann
July 9	Reinert Open; Versmold, Germany; Clay $60,000; Singles – Doubles	(Turkey) Pemra Özgen (Greece) Despina Papamichail; 1–6, 6–2, [10–4]	(Serbia) Olga Danilović (Serbia) Nina Stojanović	(Germany) Anna Zaja (Netherlands) Bibiane Schoofs	(Germany) Carina Witthöft (Turkey) Çağla Büyükakçay (Italy) Martina Di Giuseppe (Liechtenstein) Kathinka von Deichmann
July 9	Tennis Championships of Honolulu; Honolulu, United States; Hard $60,000; Singles – Doubles	(Japan) Nao Hibino; 6–0, 6–2	(United States) Jessica Pegula	(United States) Danielle Lao (United States) Emina Bektas	(United States) Usue Maitane Arconada (United States) Asia Muhammad (Japan) Misaki Doi (Japan) Mai Minokoshi
July 9	Tennis Championships of Honolulu; Honolulu, United States; Hard $60,000; Singles – Doubles	(Japan) Misaki Doi (United States) Jessica Pegula; 7–6^{(7–4)}, 6–3	(United States) Taylor Johnson (United States) Ashley Lahey	(United States) Danielle Lao (United States) Emina Bektas	(United States) Usue Maitane Arconada (United States) Asia Muhammad (Japan) Misaki Doi (Japan) Mai Minokoshi
July 9	Winnipeg Challenger; Winnipeg, Canada; Hard $25,000; Singles and doubles draws	(Canada) Rebecca Marino; 7–6^{(7–3)}, 7–6^{(7–4)}	(Israel) Julia Glushko	(Mexico) Victoria Rodríguez (Australia) Maddison Inglis	(Japan) Erika Sema (Australia) Astra Sharma (United States) Sophie Chang (Italy) Georgia Brescia
July 9	Winnipeg Challenger; Winnipeg, Canada; Hard $25,000; Singles and doubles draws	(Japan) Akiko Omae (Mexico) Victoria Rodríguez; 7–6^{(7–2)}, 6–3	(Israel) Julia Glushko (United States) Sanaz Marand	(Mexico) Victoria Rodríguez (Australia) Maddison Inglis	(Japan) Erika Sema (Australia) Astra Sharma (United States) Sophie Chang (Italy) Georgia Brescia
July 9	Tianjin Health Industry Park; Tianjin, China; Hard $25,000; Singles and doubles draws	(China) Liu Fangzhou; 3–6, 6–3, 6–3	(China) Lu Jingjing	(India) Karman Thandi (Kazakhstan) Gozal Ainitdinova	(China) You Xiaodi (China) Xun Fangying (China) Wang Meiling (China) Xu Shilin
July 9	Tianjin Health Industry Park; Tianjin, China; Hard $25,000; Singles and doubles draws	(China) Feng Shuo (China) Jiang Xinyu; 6–4, 6–4	(China) Chen Jiahui (China) Ye Qiuyu	(India) Karman Thandi (Kazakhstan) Gozal Ainitdinova	(China) You Xiaodi (China) Xun Fangying (China) Wang Meiling (China) Xu Shilin
July 9	Turin, Italy; Clay $25,000; Singles and doubles draws	(Romania) Andreea Amalia Roșca; 6–1, 6–1	(Slovenia) Kaja Juvan	(Russia) Polina Leykina (Czech Republic) Anastasia Zarycká	(Austria) Barbara Haas (Russia) Varvara Gracheva (Slovenia) Nina Potočnik (Italy) Stefania Rubini
July 9	Turin, Italy; Clay $25,000; Singles and doubles draws	(Germany) Vivian Heisen (Egypt) Sandra Samir; 6–3, 6–2	(Italy) Martina Caregaro (Italy) Federica Di Sarra	(Russia) Polina Leykina (Czech Republic) Anastasia Zarycká	(Austria) Barbara Haas (Russia) Varvara Gracheva (Slovenia) Nina Potočnik (Italy) Stefania Rubini
July 9	Setúbal, Portugal; Hard $25,000; Singles and doubles draws	(Switzerland) Ylena In-Albon; 7–5, 6–2	(Bosnia and Herzegovina) Dea Herdželaš	(France) Estelle Cascino (Spain) Eva Guerrero Álvarez	(Spain) María Gutiérrez Carrasco (Argentina) Victoria Bosio (Germany) Sarah-Rebecca Sekulic (France) Caroline Roméo
July 9	Setúbal, Portugal; Hard $25,000; Singles and doubles draws	(France) Mathilde Armitano (France) Elixane Lechemia; 6–7^{(5–7)}, 6–3, [13–11]	(Slovakia) Tereza Mihalíková (Bulgaria) Julia Terziyska	(France) Estelle Cascino (Spain) Eva Guerrero Álvarez	(Spain) María Gutiérrez Carrasco (Argentina) Victoria Bosio (Germany) Sarah-Rebecca Sekulic (France) Caroline Roméo
July 9	Getxo, Spain; Clay $25,000; Singles and doubles draws	(Spain) Aliona Bolsova Zadoinov; 6–0, 6–1	(Spain) Olga Sáez Larra	(Paraguay) Montserrat González (Venezuela) Andrea Gámiz	(Germany) Romy Kölzer (Norway) Melanie Stokke (Spain) Andrea Lázaro García (Italy) Verena Meliss
July 9	Getxo, Spain; Clay $25,000; Singles and doubles draws	(Spain) Yvonne Cavallé Reimers (Spain) Ángela Fita Boluda; 6–3, 6–2	(Spain) Marina Bassols Ribera (Spain) Guiomar Maristany	(Paraguay) Montserrat González (Venezuela) Andrea Gámiz	(Germany) Romy Kölzer (Norway) Melanie Stokke (Spain) Andrea Lázaro García (Italy) Verena Meliss
July 9	Nonthaburi, Thailand; Hard $25,000; Singles and doubles draws	(India) Ankita Raina; 6–2, 6–3	(Japan) Risa Ozaki	(Thailand) Peangtarn Plipuech (South Korea) Han Na-lae	(South Korea) Jang Su-jeong (Japan) Hiroko Kuwata (Slovakia) Zuzana Zlochová (Belgium) Tamaryn Hendler
July 9	Nonthaburi, Thailand; Hard $25,000; Singles and doubles draws	(Japan) Robu Kajitani (Chinese Taipei) Lee Pei-chi; 6–4, 6–2	(China) Guo Hanyu (Thailand) Peangtarn Plipuech	(Thailand) Peangtarn Plipuech (South Korea) Han Na-lae	(South Korea) Jang Su-jeong (Japan) Hiroko Kuwata (Slovakia) Zuzana Zlochová (Belgium) Tamaryn Hendler
July 9	Knokke, Belgium; Clay $15,000; Singles and doubles draws	(Belgium) Lara Salden; 6–2, 7–5	(Belarus) Anna Kubareva	(Ukraine) Maryna Chernyshova (Russia) Anna Ukolova	(Lithuania) Justina Mikulskytė (France) Tiphanie Fiquet (Belgium) Justine Pysson (Sweden) Mirjam Björklund
July 9	Knokke, Belgium; Clay $15,000; Singles and doubles draws	(Ukraine) Maryna Chernyshova (Russia) Anna Ukolova; 1–6, 6–1, [10–8]	(Argentina) Melina Ferrero (Argentina) Sofía Luini	(Ukraine) Maryna Chernyshova (Russia) Anna Ukolova	(Lithuania) Justina Mikulskytė (France) Tiphanie Fiquet (Belgium) Justine Pysson (Sweden) Mirjam Björklund
July 9	Hong Kong; Hard $15,000; Singles and doubles draws	(Hong Kong) Eudice Chong; 6–0, 4–6, 6–3	(Japan) Sakura Hosogi	(Hong Kong) Wu Ho-ching (Japan) Ayumi Koshiishi	(Japan) Reina Takahashi (India) Ashmitha Easwaramurthi (Australia) Michaela Haet (India) Zeel Desai
July 9	Hong Kong; Hard $15,000; Singles and doubles draws	(Hong Kong) Ng Kwan-yau (Hong Kong) Wu Ho-ching; 6–4, 6–4	(India) Zeel Desai (Japan) Akari Inoue	(Hong Kong) Wu Ho-ching (Japan) Ayumi Koshiishi	(Japan) Reina Takahashi (India) Ashmitha Easwaramurthi (Australia) Michaela Haet (India) Zeel Desai
July 9	Solo, Indonesia; Hard $15,000; Singles and doubles draws	(Indonesia) Aldila Sutjiadi; 6–2, 6–0	(China) Du Zhima	(India) Mahak Jain (Japan) Mana Ayukawa	(China) Ma Yexin (China) Ni Ma Zhuoma (Japan) Ayaka Okuno (Indonesia) Rifanty Kahfiani
July 9	Solo, Indonesia; Hard $15,000; Singles and doubles draws	(Indonesia) Rifanty Kahfiani (Japan) Ayaka Okuno; 6–4, 6–0	(Indonesia) Fitriani Sabatini (Indonesia) Fitriana Sabrina	(India) Mahak Jain (Japan) Mana Ayukawa	(China) Ma Yexin (China) Ni Ma Zhuoma (Japan) Ayaka Okuno (Indonesia) Rifanty Kahfiani
July 9	Almaty, Kazakhstan; Hard $15,000; Singles and doubles draws	(Russia) Daria Kruzhkova; 6–0, 6–7^{(4–7)}, 6–1	(Russia) Valeriya Zeleva	(Kyrgyzstan) Ksenia Palkina (Croatia) Mariana Dražić	(Russia) Ksenia Kolesnikova (Kazakhstan) Dariya Detkovskaya (Russia) Anzhelika Isaeva (Belarus) Sadafmoh Tolibova
July 9	Almaty, Kazakhstan; Hard $15,000; Singles and doubles draws	(Russia) Daria Kruzhkova (Kyrgyzstan) Ksenia Palkina; 7–6^{(7–3)}, 6–4	(Croatia) Mariana Dražić (Russia) Valeriya Zeleva	(Kyrgyzstan) Ksenia Palkina (Croatia) Mariana Dražić	(Russia) Ksenia Kolesnikova (Kazakhstan) Dariya Detkovskaya (Russia) Anzhelika Isaeva (Belarus) Sadafmoh Tolibova
July 9	Amstelveen, Netherlands; Clay $15,000; Singles and doubles draws	(Sweden) Julia Rosenqvist; 4–6, 6–0, 6–3	(Sweden) Ida Jarlskog	(Croatia) Oleksandra Oliynykova (Sweden) Marina Yudanov	(Canada) Petra Januskova (New Zealand) Valentina Ivanov (United States) Dasha Ivanova (Norway) Malene Helgø
July 9	Amstelveen, Netherlands; Clay $15,000; Singles and doubles draws	(Austria) Marlies Szupper (Netherlands) Eva Vedder; 6–3, 6–4	(United Kingdom) Emily Appleton (United States) Dasha Ivanova	(Croatia) Oleksandra Oliynykova (Sweden) Marina Yudanov	(Canada) Petra Januskova (New Zealand) Valentina Ivanov (United States) Dasha Ivanova (Norway) Malene Helgø
July 9	Bucharest, Romania; Clay $15,000; Singles and doubles draws	(Romania) Georgia Crăciun; 7–5, 6–2	(Italy) Anna Turati	(Romania) Alexandra Damaschin (Romania) Denise-Antonela Stoica	(Romania) Ioana Gaspar (Romania) Irina Fetecău (Czech Republic) Barbora Miklová (Argentina) Eugenia Ganga
July 9	Bucharest, Romania; Clay $15,000; Singles and doubles draws	(United Kingdom) Soumeya Anane (Malta) Elaine Genovese; 6–4, 3–6, [10–2]	(Romania) Ioana Gaspar (Romania) Camelia Hristea	(Romania) Alexandra Damaschin (Romania) Denise-Antonela Stoica	(Romania) Ioana Gaspar (Romania) Irina Fetecău (Czech Republic) Barbora Miklová (Argentina) Eugenia Ganga
July 9	Prokuplje, Serbia; Clay $15,000; Singles and doubles draws	(Czech Republic) Gabriela Pantůčková; 6–3, 6–0	(Croatia) Lea Bošković	(Slovenia) Veronika Erjavec (Bulgaria) Petia Arshinkova	(Serbia) Barbara Bonić (Slovakia) Viktória Morvayová (Serbia) Elena Milovanović (Serbia) Draginja Vuković
July 9	Prokuplje, Serbia; Clay $15,000; Singles and doubles draws	(Serbia) Barbara Bonić (Australia) Jelena Stojanovic; 6–2, 6–1	(Egypt) Ola Abou Zekry (Poland) Joanna Zawadzka	(Slovenia) Veronika Erjavec (Bulgaria) Petia Arshinkova	(Serbia) Barbara Bonić (Slovakia) Viktória Morvayová (Serbia) Elena Milovanović (Serbia) Draginja Vuković
July 16	ITS Cup; Olomouc, Czech Republic; Clay $80,000+H; Singles – Doubles	(France) Fiona Ferro; 6–4, 6–4	(Czech Republic) Karolína Muchová	(Croatia) Tereza Mrdeža (Italy) Giulia Gatto-Monticone	(Germany) Anna Zaja (Poland) Maja Chwalińska (Ukraine) Anhelina Kalinina (Ukraine) Kateryna Kozlova
July 16	ITS Cup; Olomouc, Czech Republic; Clay $80,000+H; Singles – Doubles	(Czech Republic) Petra Krejsová (Czech Republic) Jesika Malečková; 6–2, 6–1	(Czech Republic) Lucie Hradecká (Netherlands) Michaëlla Krajicek	(Croatia) Tereza Mrdeža (Italy) Giulia Gatto-Monticone	(Germany) Anna Zaja (Poland) Maja Chwalińska (Ukraine) Anhelina Kalinina (Ukraine) Kateryna Kozlova
July 16	President's Cup; Astana, Kazakhstan; Hard $80,000; Singles – Doubles	(Georgia (country)) Ekaterine Gorgodze; 6–4, 6–1	(Uzbekistan) Sabina Sharipova	(Russia) Varvara Flink (Czech Republic) Marie Bouzková	(Serbia) Natalija Kostić (Russia) Olga Doroshina (Russia) Anastasia Gasanova (Russia) Ekaterina Yashina
July 16	President's Cup; Astana, Kazakhstan; Hard $80,000; Singles – Doubles	(Turkey) Berfu Cengiz (Kazakhstan) Anna Danilina; 3–6, 6–3, [10–7]	(Uzbekistan) Akgul Amanmuradova (Georgia (country)) Ekaterine Gorgodze	(Russia) Varvara Flink (Czech Republic) Marie Bouzková	(Serbia) Natalija Kostić (Russia) Olga Doroshina (Russia) Anastasia Gasanova (Russia) Ekaterina Yashina
July 16	Berkeley Tennis Club Challenge; Berkeley, United States; Hard $60,000; Singles – Doubles	(United States) Sofia Kenin; 6–0, 6–4	(United States) Nicole Gibbs	(Japan) Nao Hibino (United States) Ashley Kratzer	(Japan) Mayo Hibi (United States) Francesca Di Lorenzo (United States) Kristie Ahn (United States) Jamie Loeb
July 16	Berkeley Tennis Club Challenge; Berkeley, United States; Hard $60,000; Singles – Doubles	(United States) Nicole Gibbs (United States) Asia Muhammad; 6–4, 6–1	(Australia) Ellen Perez (United States) Sabrina Santamaria	(Japan) Nao Hibino (United States) Ashley Kratzer	(Japan) Mayo Hibi (United States) Francesca Di Lorenzo (United States) Kristie Ahn (United States) Jamie Loeb
July 16	Challenger de Gatineau; Gatineau, Canada; Hard $25,000; Singles and doubles draws	(Australia) Astra Sharma; 3–6, 6–4, 6–3	(Mexico) Victoria Rodríguez	(Italy) Georgia Brescia (United Kingdom) Alicia Barnett	(Australia) Arina Rodionova (Israel) Julia Glushko (Australia) Maddison Inglis (Canada) Katherine Sebov
July 16	Challenger de Gatineau; Gatineau, Canada; Hard $25,000; Singles and doubles draws	(Canada) Bianca Andreescu (Canada) Carson Branstine; 4–6, 6–2, [10–4]	(Chinese Taipei) Hsu Chieh-yu (Mexico) Marcela Zacarías	(Italy) Georgia Brescia (United Kingdom) Alicia Barnett	(Australia) Arina Rodionova (Israel) Julia Glushko (Australia) Maddison Inglis (Canada) Katherine Sebov
July 16	Darmstadt, Germany; Clay $25,000; Singles and doubles draws	(Spain) Aliona Bolsova Zadoinov; 6–2, 6–1	(Germany) Katharina Gerlach	(United States) Elizabeth Halbauer (Germany) Romy Kölzer	(Croatia) Iva Primorac (Turkey) Pemra Özgen (Slovenia) Nina Potočnik (Austria) Melanie Klaffner
July 16	Darmstadt, Germany; Clay $25,000; Singles and doubles draws	(Italy) Martina Colmegna (Greece) Despina Papamichail; 6–4, 3–6, [10–6]	(Germany) Romy Kölzer (Venezuela) Aymet Uzcátegui	(United States) Elizabeth Halbauer (Germany) Romy Kölzer	(Croatia) Iva Primorac (Turkey) Pemra Özgen (Slovenia) Nina Potočnik (Austria) Melanie Klaffner
July 16	Imola, Italy; Carpet $25,000; Singles and doubles draws	(Italy) Stefania Rubini; 2–0 ret.	(France) Shérazad Reix	(Russia) Liudmila Samsonova (Romania) Laura-Ioana Andrei	(United Kingdom) Sarah Beth Grey (Luxembourg) Eléonora Molinaro (Spain) Irene Burillo Escorihuela (France) Alice Tubello
July 16	Imola, Italy; Carpet $25,000; Singles and doubles draws	(Italy) Federica Di Sarra (Italy) Giorgia Marchetti; 6–3, 6–1	(Italy) Claudia Giovine (Slovenia) Manca Pislak	(Russia) Liudmila Samsonova (Romania) Laura-Ioana Andrei	(United Kingdom) Sarah Beth Grey (Luxembourg) Eléonora Molinaro (Spain) Irene Burillo Escorihuela (France) Alice Tubello
July 16	Figueira da Foz, Portugal; Hard $25,000+H; Singles and doubles draws	(France) Jessika Ponchet; 7–6^{(7–4)}, 6–2	(Spain) Eva Guerrero Álvarez	(Argentina) Victoria Bosio (France) Irina Ramialison	(Oman) Fatma Al-Nabhani (Spain) Nuria Párrizas Díaz (Spain) Cristina Bucșa (Germany) Julia Wachaczyk
July 16	Figueira da Foz, Portugal; Hard $25,000+H; Singles and doubles draws	(Spain) Yvonne Cavallé Reimers (Venezuela) Andrea Gámiz; 6–2, 7–5	(Belarus) Sviatlana Pirazhenka (France) Jessika Ponchet	(Argentina) Victoria Bosio (France) Irina Ramialison	(Oman) Fatma Al-Nabhani (Spain) Nuria Párrizas Díaz (Spain) Cristina Bucșa (Germany) Julia Wachaczyk
July 16	Nonthaburi, Thailand; Hard $25,000; Singles and doubles draws	(Chinese Taipei) Lee Ya-hsuan; 6–1, 6–3	(China) Zhang Kailin	(Japan) Miyu Kato (Japan) Hiroko Kuwata	(China) Yuan Yue (Australia) Kaylah McPhee (India) Rutuja Bhosale (South Korea) Jang Su-jeong
July 16	Nonthaburi, Thailand; Hard $25,000; Singles and doubles draws	(India) Rutuja Bhosale (India) Pranjala Yadlapalli; 7–5, 6–2	(Chinese Taipei) Chen Pei-hsuan (Chinese Taipei) Wu Fang-hsien	(Japan) Miyu Kato (Japan) Hiroko Kuwata	(China) Yuan Yue (Australia) Kaylah McPhee (India) Rutuja Bhosale (South Korea) Jang Su-jeong
July 16	Vienna, Austria; Clay $15,000; Singles and doubles draws	(Poland) Marta Leśniak; 6–0, 6–3	(United Kingdom) Francesca Jones	(Slovakia) Lenka Juríková (Austria) Betina Pirker	(Czech Republic) Sabina Machalová (Czech Republic) Veronika Vlkovská (Croatia) Katja Milaš (Slovakia) Jana Jablonovská
July 16	Vienna, Austria; Clay $15,000; Singles and doubles draws	(Slovakia) Jana Jablonovská (Slovakia) Lenka Juríková; 1–6, 6–3, [10–4]	(Czech Republic) Sabina Machalová (Czech Republic) Veronika Vlkovská	(Slovakia) Lenka Juríková (Austria) Betina Pirker	(Czech Republic) Sabina Machalová (Czech Republic) Veronika Vlkovská (Croatia) Katja Milaš (Slovakia) Jana Jablonovská
July 16	Brussels, Belgium; Clay $15,000; Singles and doubles draws	(Sweden) Mirjam Björklund; 7–5, 6–1	(Germany) Julyette Steur	(Belgium) Eliessa Vanlangendonck (Belgium) Lara Salden	(Ukraine) Maryna Chernyshova (France) Vinciane Rémy (Italy) Nastassja Burnett (Greece) Marianne Argyrokastriti
July 16	Brussels, Belgium; Clay $15,000; Singles and doubles draws	(Germany) Lina Puppendahl (Germany) Sabrina Rittberger; 6–2, 6–2	(Belgium) Lara Salden (France) Camille Sireix	(Belgium) Eliessa Vanlangendonck (Belgium) Lara Salden	(Ukraine) Maryna Chernyshova (France) Vinciane Rémy (Italy) Nastassja Burnett (Greece) Marianne Argyrokastriti
July 16	Pärnu, Estonia; Clay $15,000; Singles and doubles draws	(Latvia) Daniela Vismane; 4–6, 6–4, 6–2	(Russia) Angelina Zhuravleva	(Netherlands) Merel Hoedt (Russia) Ksenia Tarasova	(Russia) Sofia Dmitrieva (Russia) Maria Zotova (Latvia) Margarita Ignatjeva (Estonia) Elena Malõgina
July 16	Pärnu, Estonia; Clay $15,000; Singles and doubles draws	(Estonia) Saara Orav (Estonia) Katriin Saar; 6–4, 6–2	(Russia) Adelina Baravi (Russia) Elina Vikhrianova	(Netherlands) Merel Hoedt (Russia) Ksenia Tarasova	(Russia) Sofia Dmitrieva (Russia) Maria Zotova (Latvia) Margarita Ignatjeva (Estonia) Elena Malõgina
July 16	Dijon, France; Hard $15,000; Singles and doubles draws	(United States) Katharine Fahey; 7–6^{(7–3)}, 6–4	(Czech Republic) Michaela Bayerlová	(France) Emmanuelle Salas (United Kingdom) Tiffany William	(France) Pauline Payet (Switzerland) Sandy Marti (France) Olympe Lancelot (France) Tiphanie Fiquet
July 16	Dijon, France; Hard $15,000; Singles and doubles draws	(France) Émeline Dartron (France) Mylène Halemai; 3–6, 7–6^{(7–1)}, [10–5]	(Romania) Karola Patricia Bejenaru (Germany) Yana Morderger	(France) Emmanuelle Salas (United Kingdom) Tiffany William	(France) Pauline Payet (Switzerland) Sandy Marti (France) Olympe Lancelot (France) Tiphanie Fiquet
July 16	Baja, Hungary; Clay $15,000; Singles and doubles draws	(Ukraine) Daria Lopatetska; 6–1, 6–4	(Romania) Cristina Ene	(Switzerland) Lara Michel (Germany) Julia Kimmelmann	(Romania) Gabriela Nicole Tătăruș (Croatia) Ivana Topčić (Slovakia) Timea Jarušková (Slovakia) Viktória Morvayová
July 16	Baja, Hungary; Clay $15,000; Singles and doubles draws	(United Kingdom) Soumeya Anane (Germany) Julia Kimmelmann; 6–3, 6–2	(Romania) Elena-Teodora Cadar (Romania) Cristina Ene	(Switzerland) Lara Michel (Germany) Julia Kimmelmann	(Romania) Gabriela Nicole Tătăruș (Croatia) Ivana Topčić (Slovakia) Timea Jarušková (Slovakia) Viktória Morvayová
July 16	Jakarta, Indonesia; Hard $15,000; Singles and doubles draws	(Netherlands) Arianne Hartono; 6–4, 6–1	(India) Mahak Jain	(India) Zeel Desai (Indonesia) Aldila Sutjiadi	(Hong Kong) Wu Ho-ching (Japan) Ayaka Okuno (India) Kanika Vaidya (Indonesia) Fitriani Sabatini
July 16	Jakarta, Indonesia; Hard $15,000; Singles and doubles draws	(Netherlands) Arianne Hartono (Indonesia) Aldila Sutjiadi; 6–1, 6–2	(Japan) Mana Ayukawa (India) Zeel Desai	(India) Zeel Desai (Indonesia) Aldila Sutjiadi	(Hong Kong) Wu Ho-ching (Japan) Ayaka Okuno (India) Kanika Vaidya (Indonesia) Fitriani Sabatini
July 16	Don Benito, Spain; Carpet $15,000; Singles and doubles draws	(Spain) María José Luque Moreno; 7–5, 6–0	(Denmark) Olga Helmi	(Spain) Olga Parres Azcoitia (Spain) Estela Pérez Somarriba	(Spain) Júlia Payola (Italy) Nuria Brancaccio (Spain) Andrea Lázaro García (United Kingdom) Emily Appleton
July 16	Don Benito, Spain; Carpet $15,000; Singles and doubles draws	(Spain) Marina Bassols Ribera (Germany) Irina Cantos Siemers; 6–1, 6–2	(Spain) Noelia Bouzó Zanotti (Spain) Ángela Fita Boluda	(Spain) Olga Parres Azcoitia (Spain) Estela Pérez Somarriba	(Spain) Júlia Payola (Italy) Nuria Brancaccio (Spain) Andrea Lázaro García (United Kingdom) Emily Appleton
July 23	Advantage Cars Prague Open; Prague, Czech Republic; Clay $80,000; Singles – Doubles	(Netherlands) Richèl Hogenkamp; 6–4, 6–2	(Italy) Martina Di Giuseppe	(Poland) Iga Świątek (Germany) Tamara Korpatsch	(Germany) Mona Barthel (United States) Katerina Stewart (Czech Republic) Karolína Muchová (Bulgaria) Elitsa Kostova
July 23	Advantage Cars Prague Open; Prague, Czech Republic; Clay $80,000; Singles – Doubles	(Sweden) Cornelia Lister (Serbia) Nina Stojanović; 6–2, 2–6, [10–8]	(Netherlands) Bibiane Schoofs (Belgium) Kimberley Zimmermann	(Poland) Iga Świątek (Germany) Tamara Korpatsch	(Germany) Mona Barthel (United States) Katerina Stewart (Czech Republic) Karolína Muchová (Bulgaria) Elitsa Kostova
July 23	Challenger de Granby; Granby, Canada; Hard $60,000; Singles – Doubles	(Israel) Julia Glushko; 6–4, 6–3	(Australia) Arina Rodionova	(Canada) Katherine Sebov (Canada) Bianca Andreescu	(Canada) Rebecca Marino (United States) Usue Maitane Arconada (Australia) Ellen Perez (Japan) Akiko Omae
July 23	Challenger de Granby; Granby, Canada; Hard $60,000; Singles – Doubles	(Australia) Ellen Perez (Australia) Arina Rodionova; 7–5, 6–4	(Japan) Erika Sema (Japan) Aiko Yoshitomi	(Canada) Katherine Sebov (Canada) Bianca Andreescu	(Canada) Rebecca Marino (United States) Usue Maitane Arconada (Australia) Ellen Perez (Japan) Akiko Omae
July 23	Braidy Industries Women's Tennis Classic; Ashland, United States; Hard $60,000; Singles – Doubles	(United States) Gail Brodsky; 4–6, 6–1, 6–0	(United States) Maegan Manasse	(Japan) Misaki Doi (Serbia) Jovana Jakšić	(United States) Caroline Dolehide (United States) Sanaz Marand (Mexico) Renata Zarazúa (Japan) Nao Hibino
July 23	Braidy Industries Women's Tennis Classic; Ashland, United States; Hard $60,000; Singles – Doubles	(Serbia) Jovana Jakšić (Mexico) Renata Zarazúa; 6–3, 5–7, [10–4]	(United States) Sanaz Marand (United States) Whitney Osuigwe	(Japan) Misaki Doi (Serbia) Jovana Jakšić	(United States) Caroline Dolehide (United States) Sanaz Marand (Mexico) Renata Zarazúa (Japan) Nao Hibino
July 23	Horb am Neckar, Germany; Clay $25,000; Singles and doubles draws	(Germany) Katharina Gerlach; 4–6, 6–3, 7–6^{(7–4)}	(Poland) Katarzyna Piter	(Romania) Jaqueline Cristian (Russia) Polina Leykina	(Latvia) Diāna Marcinkēviča (Germany) Katharina Hobgarski (Belgium) Hélène Scholsen (United States) Chiara Scholl
July 23	Horb am Neckar, Germany; Clay $25,000; Singles and doubles draws	(Romania) Oana Georgeta Simion (Romania) Gabriela Talabă; 6–3, 6–0	(Slovakia) Jana Jablonovská (Slovakia) Vivien Juhászová	(Romania) Jaqueline Cristian (Russia) Polina Leykina	(Latvia) Diāna Marcinkēviča (Germany) Katharina Hobgarski (Belgium) Hélène Scholsen (United States) Chiara Scholl
July 23	Baja, Hungary; Clay $25,000; Singles and doubles draws	(Argentina) Paula Ormaechea; 6–3, 7–5	(Slovenia) Nina Potočnik	(Hungary) Réka Luca Jani (Hungary) Panna Udvardy	(Italy) Gaia Sanesi (North Macedonia) Lina Gjorcheska (Hungary) Dalma Gálfi (Poland) Katarzyna Kawa
July 23	Baja, Hungary; Clay $25,000; Singles and doubles draws	(Serbia) Natalija Kostić (Argentina) Paula Ormaechea; Walkover	(Romania) Nicoleta Dascălu (Bulgaria) Isabella Shinikova	(Hungary) Réka Luca Jani (Hungary) Panna Udvardy	(Italy) Gaia Sanesi (North Macedonia) Lina Gjorcheska (Hungary) Dalma Gálfi (Poland) Katarzyna Kawa
July 23	Porto, Portugal; Clay $25,000; Singles and doubles draws	(Spain) Cristina Bucșa; 7–6^{(7–4)}, 6–1	(Switzerland) Jil Teichmann	(Spain) Olga Sáez Larra (Switzerland) Ylena In-Albon	(Italy) Martina Colmegna (United Kingdom) Sarah Beth Grey (Netherlands) Quirine Lemoine (Portugal) Inês Murta
July 23	Porto, Portugal; Clay $25,000; Singles and doubles draws	(Paraguay) Montserrat González (Brazil) Laura Pigossi; 7–5, 6–0	(Spain) Cristina Bucșa (Japan) Ramu Ueda	(Spain) Olga Sáez Larra (Switzerland) Ylena In-Albon	(Italy) Martina Colmegna (United Kingdom) Sarah Beth Grey (Netherlands) Quirine Lemoine (Portugal) Inês Murta
July 23	Tampere Open; Tampere, Finland; Clay $15,000; Singles and doubles draws	(United Kingdom) Francesca Jones; 6–2, 7–6^{(7–2)}	(Serbia) Bojana Marinković	(Paraguay) Camila Giangreco Campiz (Finland) Oona Orpana	(Russia) Polina Bakhmutkina (Estonia) Elena Malõgina (Russia) Anna Ukolova (Russia) Ekaterina Shalimova
July 23	Tampere Open; Tampere, Finland; Clay $15,000; Singles and doubles draws	(Paraguay) Camila Giangreco Campiz (Serbia) Bojana Marinković; 1–6, 6–4, [10–7]	(Russia) Polina Bakhmutkina (Estonia) Elena Malõgina	(Paraguay) Camila Giangreco Campiz (Finland) Oona Orpana	(Russia) Polina Bakhmutkina (Estonia) Elena Malõgina (Russia) Anna Ukolova (Russia) Ekaterina Shalimova
July 23	Les Contamines-Montjoie, France; Hard $15,000; Singles and doubles draws	(France) Mathilde Armitano; 1–6, 6–4, 6–3	(France) Pauline Payet	(Sweden) Kajsa Rinaldo Persson (Belgium) Justine Pysson	(Sweden) Linnéa Malmqvist (France) Caroline Roméo (Germany) Eva Marie Voracek (Romania) Karola Patricia Bejenaru
July 23	Les Contamines-Montjoie, France; Hard $15,000; Singles and doubles draws	(United States) Katharine Fahey (United States) Chiara Lommer; 6–2, 3–6, [10–8]	(France) Lou Adler (France) Mathilde Armitano	(Sweden) Kajsa Rinaldo Persson (Belgium) Justine Pysson	(Sweden) Linnéa Malmqvist (France) Caroline Roméo (Germany) Eva Marie Voracek (Romania) Karola Patricia Bejenaru
July 23	Telavi Open; Telavi, Georgia; Clay $15,000; Singles and doubles draws	(Georgia (country)) Zoziya Kardava; 6–2, 6–2	(Russia) Vasilisa Aponasenko	(Russia) Anastasia Zolotareva (Russia) Nonna Kurginyan	(Georgia (country)) Mariam Dalakishvili (Russia) Daria Kudashova (South Africa) Zani Barnard (Croatia) Tea Faber
July 23	Telavi Open; Telavi, Georgia; Clay $15,000; Singles and doubles draws	(Russia) Nadezda Gorbachkova (Moldova) Julia Helbet; 1–0, ret.	(Turkey) İpek Öz (Turkey) Melis Sezer	(Russia) Anastasia Zolotareva (Russia) Nonna Kurginyan	(Georgia (country)) Mariam Dalakishvili (Russia) Daria Kudashova (South Africa) Zani Barnard (Croatia) Tea Faber
July 23	Schio, Italy; Clay $15,000; Singles and doubles draws	(Italy) Nastassja Burnett; 6–1, 7–5	(Italy) Bianca Turati	(Luxembourg) Eléonora Molinaro (Italy) Federica Prati	(Spain) Lucía Marzal Martínez (Italy) Costanza Traversi (Brazil) Paula Cristina Gonçalves (Italy) Martina Spigarelli
July 23	Schio, Italy; Clay $15,000; Singles and doubles draws	(Italy) Costanza Traversi (Italy) Aurora Zantedeschi; 7–6^{(7–5)}, 7–6^{(7–4)}	(Switzerland) Jessica Crivelletto (Luxembourg) Eléonora Molinaro	(Luxembourg) Eléonora Molinaro (Italy) Federica Prati	(Spain) Lucía Marzal Martínez (Italy) Costanza Traversi (Brazil) Paula Cristina Gonçalves (Italy) Martina Spigarelli
July 23	Sandefjord, Norway; Clay $15,000; Singles and doubles draws	(Norway) Malene Helgø; 6–3, 4–6, 6–3	(Germany) Lisa Ponomar	(Spain) Lucía Cortez Llorca (Japan) Yukina Saigo	(Sweden) Julia Rosenqvist (Netherlands) Merel Hoedt (United States) Stephanie Nemtsova (Sweden) Sydney Berlin
July 23	Sandefjord, Norway; Clay $15,000; Singles and doubles draws	(Norway) Astrid Wanja Brune Olsen (Norway) Malene Helgø; 6–1, 6–4	(Germany) Nora Niedmers (Japan) Yukina Saigo	(Spain) Lucía Cortez Llorca (Japan) Yukina Saigo	(Sweden) Julia Rosenqvist (Netherlands) Merel Hoedt (United States) Stephanie Nemtsova (Sweden) Sydney Berlin
July 23	Taipei, Taiwan; Hard $15,000; Singles and doubles draws	(Hong Kong) Wu Ho-ching; 3–6, 5–4, ret.	(Chinese Taipei) Lee Pei-chi	(United States) Jessica Ho (Hong Kong) Eudice Chong	(Japan) Michiru Furuya (Chinese Taipei) Lee Hua-chen (Australia) Kaylah McPhee (Australia) Ivana Popovic
July 23	Taipei, Taiwan; Hard $15,000; Singles and doubles draws	(Chinese Taipei) Joanna Garland (Chinese Taipei) Lee Hua-chen; 6–1, 3–6, [10–1]	(Chinese Taipei) Chan Chin-wei (Japan) Kotomi Takahata	(United States) Jessica Ho (Hong Kong) Eudice Chong	(Japan) Michiru Furuya (Chinese Taipei) Lee Hua-chen (Australia) Kaylah McPhee (Australia) Ivana Popovic
July 23	Evansville, United States; Hard $15,000; Singles and doubles draws	(United States) Elysia Bolton; 6–3, 4–6, 6–3	(United States) Connie Ma	(United States) Pamela Montez (United States) Savannah Broadus	(Italy) Francesca Fusinato (United States) Peyton Stearns (United States) Alexa Graham (United States) Niluka Madurawe
July 23	Evansville, United States; Hard $15,000; Singles and doubles draws	(United States) Connie Ma (United States) Gianna Pielet; 6–3, 7–5	(United States) Meghan Kelley (United States) Bianca Moldovan	(United States) Pamela Montez (United States) Savannah Broadus	(Italy) Francesca Fusinato (United States) Peyton Stearns (United States) Alexa Graham (United States) Niluka Madurawe
July 30	Lexington Challenger; Lexington, United States; Hard $60,000; Singles – Doubles	(United States) Asia Muhammad; 7–5, 6–1	(United States) Ann Li	(United States) Quinn Gleason (United States) Jessica Pegula	(France) Jessika Ponchet (Czech Republic) Marie Bouzková (United Kingdom) Katy Dunne (United States) Anastasia Nefedova
July 30	Lexington Challenger; Lexington, United States; Hard $60,000; Singles – Doubles	(United States) Hayley Carter (United States) Ena Shibahara; 6–3, 6–1	(United States) Sanaz Marand (Mexico) Victoria Rodríguez	(United States) Quinn Gleason (United States) Jessica Pegula	(France) Jessika Ponchet (Czech Republic) Marie Bouzková (United Kingdom) Katy Dunne (United States) Anastasia Nefedova
July 30	Bad Saulgau, Germany; Clay $25,000+H; Singles and doubles draws	(Germany) Laura Siegemund; 6–4, 6–2	(Romania) Alexandra Cadanțu	(Ukraine) Olga Ianchuk (Austria) Barbara Haas	(Russia) Marina Melnikova (Netherlands) Bibiane Schoofs (Germany) Katharina Gerlach (Brazil) Carolina Alves
July 30	Bad Saulgau, Germany; Clay $25,000+H; Singles and doubles draws	(Uzbekistan) Albina Khabibulina (Belgium) Hélène Scholsen; 6–2, 6–4	(Croatia) Lea Bošković (United States) Chiara Scholl	(Ukraine) Olga Ianchuk (Austria) Barbara Haas	(Russia) Marina Melnikova (Netherlands) Bibiane Schoofs (Germany) Katharina Gerlach (Brazil) Carolina Alves
July 30	Open Castilla y León; El Espinar, Spain; Hard $25,000; Singles and doubles draws	(Russia) Liudmila Samsonova; 6–2, 6–0	(Turkey) Başak Eraydın	(Spain) Yvonne Cavallé Reimers (Spain) Andrea Lázaro García	(Spain) Paula Badosa Gibert (Spain) Eva Guerrero Álvarez (Spain) Cristina Bucșa (France) Tessah Andrianjafitrimo
July 30	Open Castilla y León; El Espinar, Spain; Hard $25,000; Singles and doubles draws	(Spain) Marina Bassols Ribera (Spain) Olga Parres Azcoitia; 7–5, 6–4	(Serbia) Tamara Čurović (Turkey) Başak Eraydın	(Spain) Yvonne Cavallé Reimers (Spain) Andrea Lázaro García	(Spain) Paula Badosa Gibert (Spain) Eva Guerrero Álvarez (Spain) Cristina Bucșa (France) Tessah Andrianjafitrimo
July 30	GB Pro-Series Foxhills; Woking, United Kingdom; Hard $25,000; Singles and doubles draws	(Czech Republic) Tereza Smitková; 6–7^{(5–7)}, 7–5, 6–4	(Serbia) Ivana Jorović	(Romania) Andreea Roșca (Greece) Valentini Grammatikopoulou	(Turkey) Pemra Özgen (United Kingdom) Freya Christie (Netherlands) Lesley Kerkhove (Italy) Giulia Gatto-Monticone
July 30	GB Pro-Series Foxhills; Woking, United Kingdom; Hard $25,000; Singles and doubles draws	(Hungary) Dalma Gálfi (Greece) Valentini Grammatikopoulou; 6–0, 4–6, [11–9]	(United Kingdom) Emily Arbuthnott (Kazakhstan) Anna Danilina	(Romania) Andreea Roșca (Greece) Valentini Grammatikopoulou	(Turkey) Pemra Özgen (United Kingdom) Freya Christie (Netherlands) Lesley Kerkhove (Italy) Giulia Gatto-Monticone
July 30	Fort Worth, United States; Hard $25,000; Singles and doubles draws	(United States) Maria Mateas; 6–3, 7–5	(United States) Robin Anderson	(New Zealand) Paige Mary Hourigan (Peru) Dominique Schaefer	(United States) Kelly Chen (Mexico) Marcela Zacarías (United States) Alexa Graham (United States) Rhiann Newborn
July 30	Fort Worth, United States; Hard $25,000; Singles and doubles draws	(Chinese Taipei) Hsu Chieh-yu (Mexico) Marcela Zacarías; 3–6, 7–6^{(8–6)}, [10–6]	(Japan) Ayaka Okuno (Australia) Olivia Tjandramulia	(New Zealand) Paige Mary Hourigan (Peru) Dominique Schaefer	(United States) Kelly Chen (Mexico) Marcela Zacarías (United States) Alexa Graham (United States) Rhiann Newborn
July 30	Savitaipale, Finland; Clay $15,000; Singles and doubles draws	(Romania) Alexandra Damaschin; 2–6, 6–2, 6–0	(Austria) Melanie Klaffner	(Russia) Angelina Zhuravleva (Norway) Malene Helgø	(Belgium) Axana Mareen (Finland) Venla Ahti (Poland) Daria Kuczer (Netherlands) Merel Hoedt
July 30	Savitaipale, Finland; Clay $15,000; Singles and doubles draws	(Russia) Polina Bakhmutkina (Estonia) Elena Malõgina; 6–4, 1–6, [10–5]	(Norway) Astrid Wanja Brune Olsen (Norway) Malene Helgø	(Russia) Angelina Zhuravleva (Norway) Malene Helgø	(Belgium) Axana Mareen (Finland) Venla Ahti (Poland) Daria Kuczer (Netherlands) Merel Hoedt
July 30	Dublin, Ireland; Carpet $15,000; Singles and doubles draws	(United Kingdom) Emily Appleton; 6–4, 6–3	(United Kingdom) Sasha Hill	(Republic of Ireland) Julie Byrne (France) Alice Robbe	(Republic of Ireland) Amy Bowtell (Germany) Lisa Ponomar (United Kingdom) Tiffany William (Sweden) Linnéa Malmqvist
July 30	Dublin, Ireland; Carpet $15,000; Singles and doubles draws	(Romania) Karola Patricia Bejenaru (Germany) Julia Kimmelmann; 6–3, 2–6, [10–7]	(United Kingdom) Emily Appleton (Germany) Lisa Ponomar	(Republic of Ireland) Julie Byrne (France) Alice Robbe	(Republic of Ireland) Amy Bowtell (Germany) Lisa Ponomar (United Kingdom) Tiffany William (Sweden) Linnéa Malmqvist
July 30	Biella, Italy; Clay $15,000; Singles and doubles draws	(Italy) Bianca Turati; 6–3, 6–4	(Italy) Nastassja Burnett	(Italy) Claudia Giovine (Italy) Dalila Spiteri	(Belgium) Justine Pysson (Italy) Verena Hofer (Serbia) Mihaela Đaković (Spain) Noelia Bouzó Zanotti
July 30	Biella, Italy; Clay $15,000; Singles and doubles draws	(Italy) Costanza Traversi (Italy) Aurora Zantedeschi; 6–2, 6–3	(Belarus) Sviatlana Pirazhenka (Italy) Dalila Spiteri	(Italy) Claudia Giovine (Italy) Dalila Spiteri	(Belgium) Justine Pysson (Italy) Verena Hofer (Serbia) Mihaela Đaković (Spain) Noelia Bouzó Zanotti
July 30	Kazan, Russia; Clay $15,000; Singles and doubles draws	(Russia) Daria Mishina; 6–3, 6–1	(Russia) Valeriya Yushchenko	(Russia) Maria Timofeeva (Russia) Ekaterina Vishnevskaya	(Russia) Alena Fomina (Russia) Anastasia Sukhotina (Russia) Maria Titova (Russia) Ekaterina Kazionova
July 30	Kazan, Russia; Clay $15,000; Singles and doubles draws	(Russia) Maria Krupenina (Russia) Anastasia Tikhonova; 4–6, 6–3, [10–8]	(Russia) Daria Mishina (Russia) Noel Saidenova	(Russia) Maria Timofeeva (Russia) Ekaterina Vishnevskaya	(Russia) Alena Fomina (Russia) Anastasia Sukhotina (Russia) Maria Titova (Russia) Ekaterina Kazionova

=== August ===
Week of	Tournament	Winner	Runners-up	Semifinalists	Quarterfinalists
August 6	Jinan International Open; Jinan, China; Hard $60,000; Singles – Doubles	(China) Zhu Lin; 6–4, 6–1	(China) Wang Yafan	(Thailand) Luksika Kumkhum (China) Xun Fangying	(South Korea) Jang Su-jeong (Japan) Mai Minokoshi (China) You Xiaodi (India) Ankita Raina
August 6	Jinan International Open; Jinan, China; Hard $60,000; Singles – Doubles	(China) Wang Xinyu (China) You Xiaodi; 6–3, 6–7^{(5–7)}, [10–2]	(Chinese Taipei) Hsieh Shu-ying (China) Lu Jingjing	(Thailand) Luksika Kumkhum (China) Xun Fangying	(South Korea) Jang Su-jeong (Japan) Mai Minokoshi (China) You Xiaodi (India) Ankita Raina
August 6	Ladies Open Hechingen; Hechingen, Germany; Clay $60,000; Singles – Doubles	(Georgia (country)) Ekaterine Gorgodze; 6–2, 6–1	(Germany) Laura Siegemund	(Germany) Anna Zaja (Germany) Tamara Korpatsch	(Germany) Katharina Hobgarski (Russia) Varvara Flink (Germany) Lena Rüffer (Austria) Julia Grabher
August 6	Ladies Open Hechingen; Hechingen, Germany; Clay $60,000; Singles – Doubles	(Russia) Polina Monova (Slovakia) Chantal Škamlová; 6–4, 6–3	(Kyrgyzstan) Ksenia Palkina (Georgia (country)) Sofia Shapatava	(Germany) Anna Zaja (Germany) Tamara Korpatsch	(Germany) Katharina Hobgarski (Russia) Varvara Flink (Germany) Lena Rüffer (Austria) Julia Grabher
August 6	Koser Jewelers Tennis Challenge; Landisville, United States; Hard $60,000; Singles – Doubles	(United States) Madison Brengle; 6–4, 1–0, ret.	(United States) Kristie Ahn	(Australia) Priscilla Hon (United States) Jessica Pegula	(Ukraine) Anhelina Kalinina (United States) Ann Li (United States) Gail Brodsky (Australia) Kimberly Birrell
August 6	Koser Jewelers Tennis Challenge; Landisville, United States; Hard $60,000; Singles – Doubles	(Australia) Ellen Perez (Australia) Arina Rodionova; 6–0, 6–2	(Chinese Taipei) Chen Pei-hsuan (Chinese Taipei) Wu Fang-hsien	(Australia) Priscilla Hon (United States) Jessica Pegula	(Ukraine) Anhelina Kalinina (United States) Ann Li (United States) Gail Brodsky (Australia) Kimberly Birrell
August 6	Koksijde, Belgium; Clay $25,000; Singles and doubles draws	(Netherlands) Richèl Hogenkamp; 6–4, 6–1	(Czech Republic) Miriam Kolodziejová	(Belgium) Marie Benoît (Hungary) Anna Bondár	(Ukraine) Valeriya Strakhova (Italy) Lucrezia Stefanini (Russia) Liudmila Samsonova (Luxembourg) Eléonora Molinaro
August 6	Koksijde, Belgium; Clay $25,000; Singles and doubles draws	(Hungary) Anna Bondár (Romania) Raluca Georgiana Șerban; 6–3, 6–0	(Bosnia and Herzegovina) Dea Herdželaš (Slovakia) Tereza Mihalíková	(Belgium) Marie Benoît (Hungary) Anna Bondár	(Ukraine) Valeriya Strakhova (Italy) Lucrezia Stefanini (Russia) Liudmila Samsonova (Luxembourg) Eléonora Molinaro
August 6	Warsaw, Poland; Clay $25,000; Singles and doubles draws	(Ukraine) Olga Ianchuk; 6–3, 4–6, 6–3	(Argentina) Victoria Bosio	(Poland) Maja Chwalińska (Poland) Katarzyna Kawa	(Serbia) Natalija Kostić (Ukraine) Ganna Poznikhirenko (Russia) Polina Leykina (Bulgaria) Julia Stamatova
August 6	Warsaw, Poland; Clay $25,000; Singles and doubles draws	(Poland) Maja Chwalińska (Poland) Daria Kuczer; 3–6, 7–6^{(7–5)}, [10–1]	(Poland) Martyna Kubka (Poland) Stefania Rogozińska Dzik	(Poland) Maja Chwalińska (Poland) Katarzyna Kawa	(Serbia) Natalija Kostić (Ukraine) Ganna Poznikhirenko (Russia) Polina Leykina (Bulgaria) Julia Stamatova
August 6	Las Palmas, Spain; Clay $25,000; Singles and doubles draws	(Turkey) Başak Eraydın; 6–4, 6–3	(Spain) Guiomar Maristany	(Spain) Irene Burillo Escorihuela (Russia) Victoria Kan	(Russia) Yana Sizikova (Turkey) İpek Soylu (Spain) Yvonne Cavallé Reimers (France) Chloé Paquet
August 6	Las Palmas, Spain; Clay $25,000; Singles and doubles draws	(Norway) Ulrikke Eikeri (Russia) Yana Sizikova; 6–2, 6–4	(Turkey) Başak Eraydın (Turkey) İpek Soylu	(Spain) Irene Burillo Escorihuela (Russia) Victoria Kan	(Russia) Yana Sizikova (Turkey) İpek Soylu (Spain) Yvonne Cavallé Reimers (France) Chloé Paquet
August 6	Nonthaburi, Thailand; Hard $25,000; Singles and doubles draws	(China) Wang Xiyu; 6–3, 7–5	(Czech Republic) Barbora Štefková	(India) Pranjala Yadlapalli (Japan) Junri Namigata	(Chinese Taipei) Lee Ya-hsuan (South Korea) Kim Da-bin (Slovakia) Zuzana Zlochová (Australia) Kaylah McPhee
August 6	Nonthaburi, Thailand; Hard $25,000; Singles and doubles draws	(India) Rutuja Bhosale (India) Pranjala Yadlapalli; 2–6, 6–0, [10–6]	(Australia) Naiktha Bains (Czech Republic) Barbora Štefková	(India) Pranjala Yadlapalli (Japan) Junri Namigata	(Chinese Taipei) Lee Ya-hsuan (South Korea) Kim Da-bin (Slovakia) Zuzana Zlochová (Australia) Kaylah McPhee
August 6	Chiswick, United Kingdom; Hard $25,000; Singles and doubles draws	(Russia) Vitalia Diatchenko; 6–1, 7–5	(Greece) Valentini Grammatikopoulou	(Serbia) Ivana Jorović (United Kingdom) Samantha Murray	(United Kingdom) Jodie Anna Burrage (Italy) Lucia Bronzetti (Netherlands) Lesley Kerkhove (Turkey) Pemra Özgen
August 6	Chiswick, United Kingdom; Hard $25,000; Singles and doubles draws	(United Kingdom) Freya Christie (United Kingdom) Samantha Murray; 3–6, 7–5, [10–8]	(United Kingdom) Sarah Beth Grey (United Kingdom) Olivia Nicholls	(Serbia) Ivana Jorović (United Kingdom) Samantha Murray	(United Kingdom) Jodie Anna Burrage (Italy) Lucia Bronzetti (Netherlands) Lesley Kerkhove (Turkey) Pemra Özgen
August 6	Guayaquil, Ecuador; Clay $15,000; Singles and doubles draws	(Chile) Fernanda Brito; 7–5, 6–4	(Brazil) Gabriela Cé	(United States) Akilah James (Argentina) Sofía Luini	(Colombia) Juliana Valero (France) Fiona Codino (Canada) Raphaëlle Lacasse (Chile) Bárbara Gatica
August 6	Guayaquil, Ecuador; Clay $15,000; Singles and doubles draws	(Chile) Fernanda Brito (Argentina) Sofía Luini; 6–1, 6–0	(Chile) Bárbara Gatica (Brazil) Rebeca Pereira	(United States) Akilah James (Argentina) Sofía Luini	(Colombia) Juliana Valero (France) Fiona Codino (Canada) Raphaëlle Lacasse (Chile) Bárbara Gatica
August 6	Santa Tecla, El Salvador; Hard $15,000; Singles and doubles draws	(Montenegro) Vladica Babić; 7–6^{(8–6)}, 6–4	(United States) Pamela Montez	(Russia) Anastasia Shaulskaya (United States) Monica Robinson	(Slovenia) Nastja Kolar (Guatemala) Kirsten-Andrea Weedon (Mexico) Andrea Renée Villarreal (Guatemala) María Gabriela Rivera Corado
August 6	Santa Tecla, El Salvador; Hard $15,000; Singles and doubles draws	(United States) Stephanie Nemtsova (Mexico) Andrea Renée Villarreal; 6–1, 7–6^{(7–4)}	(Montenegro) Vladica Babić (United States) Monica Robinson	(Russia) Anastasia Shaulskaya (United States) Monica Robinson	(Slovenia) Nastja Kolar (Guatemala) Kirsten-Andrea Weedon (Mexico) Andrea Renée Villarreal (Guatemala) María Gabriela Rivera Corado
August 6	Sezze, Italy; Clay $15,000; Singles and doubles draws	(Italy) Bianca Turati; 6–2, 6–1	(Italy) Nastassja Burnett	(Spain) Alba Carrillo Marín (Italy) Verena Hofer	(Spain) Noelia Bouzó Zanotti (United States) Chiara Lommer (Italy) Anna Turati (Italy) Dalila Spiteri
August 6	Sezze, Italy; Clay $15,000; Singles and doubles draws	(Spain) Noelia Bouzó Zanotti (Spain) Ángela Fita Boluda; 6–3, 6–1	(Italy) Costanza Traversi (Italy) Aurora Zantedeschi	(Spain) Alba Carrillo Marín (Italy) Verena Hofer	(Spain) Noelia Bouzó Zanotti (United States) Chiara Lommer (Italy) Anna Turati (Italy) Dalila Spiteri
August 6	Arad, Romania; Clay $15,000; Singles and doubles draws	(Bosnia and Herzegovina) Nefisa Berberović; 6–3, 0–6, 6–4	(Romania) Andreea Mitu	(Hungary) Alexa Pirok (Greece) Vasiliki Karvouni	(Romania) Alexandra Damaschin (Romania) Ioana Loredana Roșca (Romania) Cristina Ene (Romania) Georgia Crăciun
August 6	Arad, Romania; Clay $15,000; Singles and doubles draws	(Romania) Cristina Ene (Romania) Ioana Loredana Roșca; 6–3, 6–4	(Romania) Ioana Gaspar (Romania) Camelia Hristea	(Hungary) Alexa Pirok (Greece) Vasiliki Karvouni	(Romania) Alexandra Damaschin (Romania) Ioana Loredana Roșca (Romania) Cristina Ene (Romania) Georgia Crăciun
August 6	Kazan, Russia; Clay $15,000; Singles and doubles draws	(Russia) Daria Mishina; 6–1, 6–2	(Russia) Ekaterina Kazionova	(Russia) Maria Timofeeva (Russia) Diana Demidova	(Russia) Anastasia Zakharova (Russia) Polina Kudermetova (Russia) Maria Titova (Russia) Anastasia Tikhonova
August 6	Kazan, Russia; Clay $15,000; Singles and doubles draws	(Russia) Alena Fomina (Russia) Daria Kruzhkova; 6–2, 6–1	(Russia) Anna Iakovleva (Russia) Gyulnara Nazarova	(Russia) Maria Timofeeva (Russia) Diana Demidova	(Russia) Anastasia Zakharova (Russia) Polina Kudermetova (Russia) Maria Titova (Russia) Anastasia Tikhonova
August 13	Vancouver Open; Vancouver, Canada; Hard $100,000; Singles – Doubles	(Japan) Misaki Doi; 6–7^{(4–7)}, 6–1, 6–4	(United Kingdom) Heather Watson	(Japan) Nao Hibino (Italy) Martina Trevisan	(Canada) Eugenie Bouchard (United Kingdom) Katie Boulter (Romania) Alexandra Dulgheru (Canada) Rebecca Marino
August 13	Vancouver Open; Vancouver, Canada; Hard $100,000; Singles – Doubles	(United States) Desirae Krawczyk (Mexico) Giuliana Olmos; 6–2, 7–5	(Ukraine) Kateryna Kozlova (Netherlands) Arantxa Rus	(Japan) Nao Hibino (Italy) Martina Trevisan	(Canada) Eugenie Bouchard (United Kingdom) Katie Boulter (Romania) Alexandra Dulgheru (Canada) Rebecca Marino
August 13	Guiyang, China; Hard $25,000; Singles and doubles draws	(Russia) Anastasia Gasanova; 6–3, 6–4	(Serbia) Jovana Jakšić	(China) Wang Meiling (China) Lu Jiaxi	(China) Yuan Yue (China) Liu Chang (China) Zhang Kailin (China) Xun Fangying
August 13	Guiyang, China; Hard $25,000; Singles and doubles draws	(China) Kang Jiaqi (China) Xun Fangying; 3–6, 7–5, [10–6]	(China) Chen Jiahui (China) Yuan Yue	(China) Wang Meiling (China) Lu Jiaxi	(China) Yuan Yue (China) Liu Chang (China) Zhang Kailin (China) Xun Fangying
August 13	Leipzig, Germany; Clay $25,000; Singles and doubles draws	(Russia) Varvara Flink; 6–3, 6–2	(Austria) Julia Grabher	(Ukraine) Valeriya Strakhova (Austria) Barbara Haas	(Czech Republic) Johana Marková (Czech Republic) Anastasia Zarycká (Czech Republic) Miriam Kolodziejová (Bulgaria) Isabella Shinikova
August 13	Leipzig, Germany; Clay $25,000; Singles and doubles draws	(Romania) Cristina Dinu (Ukraine) Ganna Poznikhirenko; 4–6, 6–0, [10–5]	(Czech Republic) Petra Krejsová (Czech Republic) Jesika Malečková	(Ukraine) Valeriya Strakhova (Austria) Barbara Haas	(Czech Republic) Johana Marková (Czech Republic) Anastasia Zarycká (Czech Republic) Miriam Kolodziejová (Bulgaria) Isabella Shinikova
August 13	Las Palmas, Spain; Clay $25,000; Singles and doubles draws	(Turkey) Başak Eraydın; 6–2, 6–1	(France) Chloé Paquet	(Belgium) Kimberley Zimmermann (Norway) Ulrikke Eikeri	(Spain) Olga Sáez Larra (Italy) Martina Colmegna (Germany) Katharina Hobgarski (Netherlands) Quirine Lemoine
August 13	Las Palmas, Spain; Clay $25,000; Singles and doubles draws	(Netherlands) Quirine Lemoine (Netherlands) Eva Wacanno; 7–6^{(8–6)}, 6–1	(United Kingdom) Emily Arbuthnott (Sweden) Mirjam Björklund	(Belgium) Kimberley Zimmermann (Norway) Ulrikke Eikeri	(Spain) Olga Sáez Larra (Italy) Martina Colmegna (Germany) Katharina Hobgarski (Netherlands) Quirine Lemoine
August 13	Nonthaburi, Thailand; Hard $25,000; Singles and doubles draws	(China) Wang Xinyu; 6–1, 4–6, 6–1	(China) Wang Xiyu	(Czech Republic) Barbora Štefková (Thailand) Patcharin Cheapchandej	(Japan) Haruna Arakawa (Australia) Naiktha Bains (India) Rutuja Bhosale (Thailand) Punnin Kovapitukted
August 13	Nonthaburi, Thailand; Hard $25,000; Singles and doubles draws	(China) Wang Xinyu (China) Wang Xiyu; 7–5, 5–7, [10–4]	(Australia) Destanee Aiava (Australia) Naiktha Bains	(Czech Republic) Barbora Štefková (Thailand) Patcharin Cheapchandej	(Japan) Haruna Arakawa (Australia) Naiktha Bains (India) Rutuja Bhosale (Thailand) Punnin Kovapitukted
August 13	Guayaquil, Ecuador; Clay $15,000; Singles and doubles draws	(Chile) Fernanda Brito; 6–2, 6–2	(Chile) Bárbara Gatica	(Brazil) Gabriela Cé (Belgium) Anaïs Defossez	(Brazil) Pamela Wu (Russia) Anastasia Shaulskaya (Colombia) Juliana Valero (Germany) Anastasia Reimchen
August 13	Guayaquil, Ecuador; Clay $15,000; Singles and doubles draws	(Chile) Fernanda Brito (Argentina) Sofía Luini; 7–6^{(7–5)}, 6–3	(Argentina) Martina Capurro Taborda (Ecuador) Camila Romero	(Brazil) Gabriela Cé (Belgium) Anaïs Defossez	(Brazil) Pamela Wu (Russia) Anastasia Shaulskaya (Colombia) Juliana Valero (Germany) Anastasia Reimchen
August 13	International Country Cuneo; Cuneo, Italy; Clay $15,000; Singles and doubles draws	(Brazil) Paula Cristina Gonçalves; 6–4, 6–2	(Italy) Bianca Turati	(France) Caroline Roméo (Italy) Dalila Spiteri	(Spain) Alba Carrillo Marín (Switzerland) Lara Michel (Italy) Anna Turati (Italy) Verena Meliss
August 13	International Country Cuneo; Cuneo, Italy; Clay $15,000; Singles and doubles draws	(Italy) Isabella Tcherkes Zade (Italy) Aurora Zantedeschi; 6–3, 6–1	(Italy) Jessica Bertoldo (Italy) Carlotta Ripa	(France) Caroline Roméo (Italy) Dalila Spiteri	(Spain) Alba Carrillo Marín (Switzerland) Lara Michel (Italy) Anna Turati (Italy) Verena Meliss
August 13	Oldenzaal, Netherlands; Clay $15,000; Singles and doubles draws	(Belgium) Greet Minnen; 6–2, 6–2	(Netherlands) Arianne Hartono	(Germany) Tayisiya Morderger (Belgium) Eliessa Vanlangendonck	(Netherlands) Stéphanie Visscher (Belgium) Lara Salden (Germany) Linda Puppendahl (Spain) Claudia Hoste Ferrer
August 13	Oldenzaal, Netherlands; Clay $15,000; Singles and doubles draws	(Netherlands) Annick Melgers (Netherlands) Eva Vedder; 3–6, 6–2, [11–9]	(Netherlands) Dominique Karregat (Belgium) Eliessa Vanlangendonck	(Germany) Tayisiya Morderger (Belgium) Eliessa Vanlangendonck	(Netherlands) Stéphanie Visscher (Belgium) Lara Salden (Germany) Linda Puppendahl (Spain) Claudia Hoste Ferrer
August 13	Moscow, Russia; Clay $15,000; Singles and doubles draws	(Russia) Anastasiya Komardina; 6–4, 6–1	(Russia) Vlada Koval	(Russia) Daria Lodikova (Russia) Daria Mishina	(Russia) Gyulnara Nazarova (Russia) Angelina Zhuravleva (Russia) Kamilla Rakhimova (Russia) Ekaterina Kazionova
August 13	Moscow, Russia; Clay $15,000; Singles and doubles draws	(Russia) Anastasia Frolova (Russia) Anna Morgina; 6–3, 6–4	(Russia) Anastasia Kharitonova (Russia) Daria Nazarkina	(Russia) Daria Lodikova (Russia) Daria Mishina	(Russia) Gyulnara Nazarova (Russia) Angelina Zhuravleva (Russia) Kamilla Rakhimova (Russia) Ekaterina Kazionova
August 13	Gimcheon, South Korea; Hard $15,000; Singles and doubles draws	(United Kingdom) Emily Appleton; 6–4, 3–6, 6–2	(South Korea) Ahn Yu-jin	(Chinese Taipei) Joanna Garland (South Korea) Park Sang-hee	(South Korea) Kim Se-hyun (South Korea) Hong Seung-yeon (South Korea) Lee Se-jin (South Korea) Bae Do-hee
August 13	Gimcheon, South Korea; Hard $15,000; Singles and doubles draws	(South Korea) Jung So-hee (South Korea) Kim Mi-ok; 6–7^{(5–7)}, 7–6^{(7–5)}, [14–12]	(United Kingdom) Emily Appleton (Chinese Taipei) Joanna Garland	(Chinese Taipei) Joanna Garland (South Korea) Park Sang-hee	(South Korea) Kim Se-hyun (South Korea) Hong Seung-yeon (South Korea) Lee Se-jin (South Korea) Bae Do-hee
August 20	Braunschweig, Germany; Clay $25,000; Singles and doubles draws	(Czech Republic) Anastasia Zarycká; 6–1, 6–3	(Germany) Jule Niemeier	(Hungary) Gréta Arn (Czech Republic) Jesika Malečková	(Slovakia) Kristína Kučová (Spain) Olga Sáez Larra (Germany) Vivian Heisen (Brazil) Teliana Pereira
August 20	Braunschweig, Germany; Clay $25,000; Singles and doubles draws	(Germany) Julia Wachaczyk (Czech Republic) Anastasia Zarycká; 6–4, 3–6, [11–9]	(Sweden) Cornelia Lister (Latvia) Diāna Marcinkēviča	(Hungary) Gréta Arn (Czech Republic) Jesika Malečková	(Slovakia) Kristína Kučová (Spain) Olga Sáez Larra (Germany) Vivian Heisen (Brazil) Teliana Pereira
August 20	Tsukuba, Japan; Hard $25,000; Singles and doubles draws	(China) Wang Xiyu; 3–6, 7–5, 7–5	(China) Zhang Kailin	(Japan) Nagi Hanatani (Japan) Momoko Kobori	(Japan) Erika Sema (Japan) Mana Ayukawa (Australia) Naiktha Bains (Japan) Chihiro Muramatsu
August 20	Tsukuba, Japan; Hard $25,000; Singles and doubles draws	(Japan) Akiko Omae (China) You Xiaodi; 6–0, 7–6^{(7–4)}	(Australia) Naiktha Bains (Japan) Hiroko Kuwata	(Japan) Nagi Hanatani (Japan) Momoko Kobori	(Japan) Erika Sema (Japan) Mana Ayukawa (Australia) Naiktha Bains (Japan) Chihiro Muramatsu
August 20	Wanfercée-Baulet, Belgium; Clay $15,000; Singles and doubles draws	(Belgium) Lara Salden; 6–0, 6–3	(France) Lucie Wargnier	(Austria) Sinja Kraus (France) Caroline Roméo	(France) Julie Gervais (Poland) Daria Kuczer (Japan) Yukina Saigo (Italy) Anna-Giulia Remondina
August 20	Wanfercée-Baulet, Belgium; Clay $15,000; Singles and doubles draws	(Belgium) Lara Salden (France) Camille Sireix; 6–2, 6–3	(Belgium) Michaela Boev (Belgium) Catherine Chantraine	(Austria) Sinja Kraus (France) Caroline Roméo	(France) Julie Gervais (Poland) Daria Kuczer (Japan) Yukina Saigo (Italy) Anna-Giulia Remondina
August 20	Budapest, Hungary; Clay $15,000; Singles and doubles draws	(Czech Republic) Gabriela Pantůčková; 6–3, 3–0 ret.	(Czech Republic) Magdaléna Pantůčková	(Romania) Oana Georgeta Simion (Latvia) Daniela Vismane	(Slovenia) Veronika Erjavec (Russia) Maria Marfutina (Bulgaria) Aleksandrina Naydenova (Hungary) Ágnes Bukta
August 20	Budapest, Hungary; Clay $15,000; Singles and doubles draws	(Canada) Petra Januskova (Latvia) Daniela Vismane; 7–5, 3–6, [11–9]	(Czech Republic) Klára Hájková (Czech Republic) Aneta Laboutková	(Romania) Oana Georgeta Simion (Latvia) Daniela Vismane	(Slovenia) Veronika Erjavec (Russia) Maria Marfutina (Bulgaria) Aleksandrina Naydenova (Hungary) Ágnes Bukta
August 20	Rotterdam, Netherlands; Clay $15,000; Singles and doubles draws	(Spain) Marina Bassols Ribera; 7–5, 6–2	(Belarus) Sviatlana Pirazhenka	(Germany) Natalia Siedliska (Netherlands) Merel Hoedt	(France) Lou Adler (Germany) Tayisiya Morderger (Czech Republic) Diana Šumová (Spain) Claudia Hoste Ferrer
August 20	Rotterdam, Netherlands; Clay $15,000; Singles and doubles draws	(Netherlands) Suzan Lamens (Belarus) Sviatlana Pirazhenka; 6–3, 4–6, [10–5]	(Netherlands) Dewi Dijkman (Netherlands) Isabelle Haverlag	(Germany) Natalia Siedliska (Netherlands) Merel Hoedt	(France) Lou Adler (Germany) Tayisiya Morderger (Czech Republic) Diana Šumová (Spain) Claudia Hoste Ferrer
August 20	Lambaré, Paraguay; Clay $15,000; Singles and doubles draws	(Chile) Fernanda Brito; 6–3, 1–6, 6–4	(Argentina) Jazmín Ortenzi	(Brazil) Gabriela Cé (Paraguay) Camila Giangreco Campiz	(Argentina) Eugenia Ganga (Guatemala) Kirsten-Andrea Weedon (Brazil) Eduarda Piai (Argentina) Carla Lucero
August 20	Lambaré, Paraguay; Clay $15,000; Singles and doubles draws	(Chile) Fernanda Brito (Paraguay) Camila Giangreco Campiz; 6–4, 4–6, [10–3]	(Chile) Bárbara Gatica (Brazil) Rebeca Pereira	(Brazil) Gabriela Cé (Paraguay) Camila Giangreco Campiz	(Argentina) Eugenia Ganga (Guatemala) Kirsten-Andrea Weedon (Brazil) Eduarda Piai (Argentina) Carla Lucero
August 20	Bucharest, Romania; Clay $15,000; Singles and doubles draws	(Romania) Cristina Ene; 6–4, 1–6, 6–1	(Romania) Alexandra Damaschin	(Romania) Ioana Gaspar (Romania) Selma Ștefania Cadar	(Romania) Irina Fetecău (Romania) Andreea Ghițescu (Israel) Nicole Nadel (Moldova) Anastasia Vdovenco
August 20	Bucharest, Romania; Clay $15,000; Singles and doubles draws	(Czech Republic) Anna Sisková (United States) Natalie Suk; 7–5, 6–4	(Romania) Cristina Adamescu (Romania) Andreea Ghițescu	(Romania) Ioana Gaspar (Romania) Selma Ștefania Cadar	(Romania) Irina Fetecău (Romania) Andreea Ghițescu (Israel) Nicole Nadel (Moldova) Anastasia Vdovenco
August 20	Moscow, Russia; Clay $15,000; Singles and doubles draws	(Russia) Valeriya Yushchenko; 6–0, 6–0	(Russia) Ekaterina Makarova	(Russia) Anastasia Zakharova (Russia) Vlada Koval	(Russia) Daria Kruzhkova (Belarus) Hanna Sokal (Russia) Ekaterina Kazionova (Russia) Anna Ukolova
August 20	Moscow, Russia; Clay $15,000; Singles and doubles draws	(Russia) Vlada Koval (Moldova) Vitalia Stamat; 7–6^{(7–5)}, 5–7, [10–6]	(Russia) Anastasia Frolova (Russia) Anna Morgina	(Russia) Anastasia Zakharova (Russia) Vlada Koval	(Russia) Daria Kruzhkova (Belarus) Hanna Sokal (Russia) Ekaterina Kazionova (Russia) Anna Ukolova
August 20	Vrnjačka Banja, Serbia; Clay $15,000; Singles and doubles draws	(Serbia) Draginja Vuković; 6–2, 6–4	(Russia) Amina Anshba	(Bosnia and Herzegovina) Nefisa Berberović (Serbia) Tamara Malešević	(Croatia) Ena Kajević (Germany) Julyette Steur (Serbia) Tamara Čurović (Serbia) Sara Gvozdenović
August 20	Vrnjačka Banja, Serbia; Clay $15,000; Singles and doubles draws	(Germany) Joëlle Steur (Germany) Julyette Steur; 6–2, 6–3	(Russia) Anna Makhorkina (Italy) Miriana Tona	(Bosnia and Herzegovina) Nefisa Berberović (Serbia) Tamara Malešević	(Croatia) Ena Kajević (Germany) Julyette Steur (Serbia) Tamara Čurović (Serbia) Sara Gvozdenović
August 20	Gimcheon, South Korea; Hard $15,000; Singles and doubles draws	(South Korea) Kim Da-hye; 6–1, 6–4	(United States) Hanna Chang	(India) Ramya Natarajan (United Kingdom) Emily Appleton	(Japan) Sakura Hosogi (South Korea) Kim Da-ye (South Korea) Park So-hyun (South Korea) Ahn Yu-jin
August 20	Gimcheon, South Korea; Hard $15,000; Singles and doubles draws	(South Korea) Jeong Yeong-won (South Korea) Park Sang-hee; 2–6, 7–6^{(9–7)}, [10–8]	(South Korea) Ahn Yu-jin (South Korea) Kim Se-hyun	(India) Ramya Natarajan (United Kingdom) Emily Appleton	(Japan) Sakura Hosogi (South Korea) Kim Da-ye (South Korea) Park So-hyun (South Korea) Ahn Yu-jin
August 20	Caslano, Switzerland; Clay $15,000; Singles and doubles draws	(Switzerland) Sandy Marti; 6–2, 6–2	(Switzerland) Tess Sugnaux	(Austria) Mira Antonitsch (Germany) Laura Schaeder	(Italy) Cristiana Ferrando (Hungary) Vanda Lukács (Switzerland) Jessica Crivelletto (United Kingdom) Francesca Jones
August 20	Caslano, Switzerland; Clay $15,000; Singles and doubles draws	(Spain) Alba Carrillo Marín (Bolivia) Noelia Zeballos; 6–4, 6–4	(Italy) Natasha Piludu (Israel) Maya Tahan	(Austria) Mira Antonitsch (Germany) Laura Schaeder	(Italy) Cristiana Ferrando (Hungary) Vanda Lukács (Switzerland) Jessica Crivelletto (United Kingdom) Francesca Jones
August 27	NEK Ladies Open; Budapest, Hungary; Clay $60,000; Singles – Doubles	(Poland) Iga Świątek; 6–2, 6–2	(Ukraine) Katarina Zavatska	(Germany) Tamara Korpatsch (Austria) Barbara Haas	(Bulgaria) Viktoriya Tomova (Poland) Maja Chwalińska (Spain) Sílvia Soler Espinosa (Serbia) Ivana Jorović
August 27	NEK Ladies Open; Budapest, Hungary; Clay $60,000; Singles – Doubles	(Norway) Ulrikke Eikeri (Bulgaria) Elitsa Kostova; 2–6, 6–4, [10–8]	(Hungary) Dalma Gálfi (Hungary) Réka Luca Jani	(Germany) Tamara Korpatsch (Austria) Barbara Haas	(Bulgaria) Viktoriya Tomova (Poland) Maja Chwalińska (Spain) Sílvia Soler Espinosa (Serbia) Ivana Jorović
August 27	Bagnatica, Italy; Clay $25,000+H; Singles and doubles draws	(Slovenia) Kaja Juvan; 6–7^{(8–10)}, 6–1, 7–5	(Italy) Jasmine Paolini	(Belgium) Kimberley Zimmermann (France) Chloé Paquet	(Greece) Valentini Grammatikopoulou (Italy) Jessica Pieri (Romania) Cristina Dinu (Russia) Liudmila Samsonova
August 27	Bagnatica, Italy; Clay $25,000+H; Singles and doubles draws	(Italy) Giorgia Marchetti (Italy) Camilla Rosatello; 6–4, 4–6, [10–8]	(Italy) Deborah Chiesa (Italy) Jasmine Paolini	(Belgium) Kimberley Zimmermann (France) Chloé Paquet	(Greece) Valentini Grammatikopoulou (Italy) Jessica Pieri (Romania) Cristina Dinu (Russia) Liudmila Samsonova
August 27	Nanao, Japan; Carpet $25,000; Singles and doubles draws	(Japan) Ayano Shimizu; 6–3, 6–1	(Japan) Mai Hontama	(Japan) Akiko Omae (Japan) Kyōka Okamura	(China) Lu Jiajing (Japan) Haruka Kaji (Japan) Himeno Sakatsume (Australia) Naiktha Bains
August 27	Nanao, Japan; Carpet $25,000; Singles and doubles draws	(Japan) Kanako Morisaki (Japan) Megumi Nishimoto; 6–2, 6–3	(Japan) Momoko Kobori (Japan) Ayano Shimizu	(Japan) Akiko Omae (Japan) Kyōka Okamura	(China) Lu Jiajing (Japan) Haruka Kaji (Japan) Himeno Sakatsume (Australia) Naiktha Bains
August 27	Almaty, Kazakhstan; Clay $25,000; Singles and doubles draws	(Belarus) Yuliya Hatouka; 6–4, 6–7^{(1–7)}, 6–2	(Kazakhstan) Anna Danilina	(Russia) Valentyna Ivakhnenko (Russia) Anastasia Frolova	(Slovenia) Nastja Kolar (Russia) Yana Sizikova (Russia) Anastasia Gasanova (Turkey) Berfu Cengiz
August 27	Almaty, Kazakhstan; Clay $25,000; Singles and doubles draws	(Slovakia) Tereza Mihalíková (Ukraine) Valeriya Strakhova; 1–6, 6–2, [10–5]	(Russia) Polina Monova (Russia) Yana Sizikova	(Russia) Valentyna Ivakhnenko (Russia) Anastasia Frolova	(Slovenia) Nastja Kolar (Russia) Yana Sizikova (Russia) Anastasia Gasanova (Turkey) Berfu Cengiz
August 27	Říčany, Czech Republic; Clay $15,000; Singles and doubles draws	(Czech Republic) Vendula Žovincová; 6–3, 6–7^{(2–7)}, 7–6^{(7–0)}	(Germany) Julyette Steur	(Czech Republic) Aneta Laboutková (Czech Republic) Kateřina Vaňková	(Czech Republic) Pernilla Mendesová (Finland) Oona Orpana (Czech Republic) Veronika Vlkovská (Czech Republic) Diana Šumová
August 27	Říčany, Czech Republic; Clay $15,000; Singles and doubles draws	(Czech Republic) Karolína Kubáňová (Czech Republic) Nikola Tomanová; 6–7^{(2–7)}, 6–4, [11–9]	(Germany) Julyette Steur (Czech Republic) Vendula Žovincová	(Czech Republic) Aneta Laboutková (Czech Republic) Kateřina Vaňková	(Czech Republic) Pernilla Mendesová (Finland) Oona Orpana (Czech Republic) Veronika Vlkovská (Czech Republic) Diana Šumová
August 27	Haren, Netherlands; Clay $15,000; Singles and doubles draws	(Spain) Marina Bassols Ribera; 6–2, 7–6^{(7–4)}	(Belgium) Lara Salden	(Netherlands) Arianne Hartono (Germany) Natalia Siedliska	(Germany) Mina Hodzic (Bulgaria) Gergana Topalova (Japan) Yukina Saigo (Netherlands) Dominique Karregat
August 27	Haren, Netherlands; Clay $15,000; Singles and doubles draws	(Netherlands) Arianne Hartono (Netherlands) Suzan Lamens; 6–1, 6–7^{(1–7)}, [10–4]	(Netherlands) Dominique Karregat (Japan) Yukina Saigo	(Netherlands) Arianne Hartono (Germany) Natalia Siedliska	(Germany) Mina Hodzic (Bulgaria) Gergana Topalova (Japan) Yukina Saigo (Netherlands) Dominique Karregat
August 27	Asunción, Paraguay; Clay $15,000; Singles and doubles draws	(Chile) Fernanda Brito; 6–3, 6–3	(Brazil) Gabriela Cé	(Paraguay) Camila Giangreco Campiz (Guatemala) Melissa Morales	(Italy) Sara Castellano (Argentina) Carla Lucero (Guatemala) Kirsten-Andrea Weedon (Chile) Bárbara Gatica
August 27	Asunción, Paraguay; Clay $15,000; Singles and doubles draws	(Chile) Fernanda Brito (Paraguay) Camila Giangreco Campiz; 6–0, 6–2	(Brazil) Marcela Guimarães Bueno (Russia) Anastasia Shaulskaya	(Paraguay) Camila Giangreco Campiz (Guatemala) Melissa Morales	(Italy) Sara Castellano (Argentina) Carla Lucero (Guatemala) Kirsten-Andrea Weedon (Chile) Bárbara Gatica
August 27	Moscow, Russia; Clay $15,000; Singles and doubles draws	(Russia) Vlada Koval; 6–2, 7–6^{(8–6)}	(Russia) Daria Mishina	(Russia) Daria Nazarkina (Russia) Gyulnara Nazarova	(Russia) Daria Kruzhkova (Russia) Anna Ukolova (Russia) Aleksandra Pospelova (Russia) Anastasia Zakharova
August 27	Moscow, Russia; Clay $15,000; Singles and doubles draws	(Russia) Anastasia Chikalkina (Russia) Anastasia Sukhotina; 7–6^{(7–4)}, 4–6, [10–6]	(Russia) Daria Kruzhkova (Moldova) Vitalia Stamat	(Russia) Daria Nazarkina (Russia) Gyulnara Nazarova	(Russia) Daria Kruzhkova (Russia) Anna Ukolova (Russia) Aleksandra Pospelova (Russia) Anastasia Zakharova
August 27	Yeongwol, South Korea; Hard $15,000; Singles and doubles draws	(South Korea) Kim Da-bin; 7–5, 6–3	(South Korea) Park So-hyun	(India) Ramya Natarajan (South Korea) Kim Da-hye	(Japan) Reina Takahashi (United States) Hanna Chang (South Korea) Cherry Kim (Russia) Angelina Gabueva
August 27	Yeongwol, South Korea; Hard $15,000; Singles and doubles draws	(Japan) Erina Hayashi (Japan) Chisa Hosonuma; 6–1, 6–1	(United States) Hanna Chang (China) Zhang Ying	(India) Ramya Natarajan (South Korea) Kim Da-hye	(Japan) Reina Takahashi (United States) Hanna Chang (South Korea) Cherry Kim (Russia) Angelina Gabueva
August 27	Nonthaburi, Thailand; Hard $15,000; Singles and doubles draws	(Chinese Taipei) Lee Hua-chen; 6–2, 6–2	(Thailand) Nudnida Luangnam	(Thailand) Tamachan Momkoonthod (Thailand) Patcharin Cheapchandej	(Thailand) Supapitch Kuearum (Thailand) Chanikarn Silakul (China) Sun Ziyue (Thailand) Anchisa Chanta
August 27	Nonthaburi, Thailand; Hard $15,000; Singles and doubles draws	(Chinese Taipei) Cho I-hsuan (China) Wang Danni; 6–4, 6–3	(India) Riya Bhatia (China) Lu Jiaxi	(Thailand) Tamachan Momkoonthod (Thailand) Patcharin Cheapchandej	(Thailand) Supapitch Kuearum (Thailand) Chanikarn Silakul (China) Sun Ziyue (Thailand) Anchisa Chanta

=== September ===
Week of	Tournament	Winner	Runners-up	Semifinalists	Quarterfinalists
September 3	Zagreb Ladies Open; Zagreb, Croatia; Clay $60,000; Singles – Doubles	(Croatia) Tereza Mrdeža; 2–6, 6–4, 7–5	(Argentina) Paula Ormaechea	(Romania) Alexandra Cadanțu (Russia) Olga Doroshina	(Turkey) Pemra Özgen (Spain) Georgina García Pérez (Slovenia) Kaja Juvan (Croatia) Tena Lukas
September 3	Zagreb Ladies Open; Zagreb, Croatia; Clay $60,000; Singles – Doubles	(Venezuela) Andrea Gámiz (Venezuela) Aymet Uzcátegui; 6–3, 6–4	(Romania) Elena Bogdan (Romania) Alexandra Cadanțu	(Romania) Alexandra Cadanțu (Russia) Olga Doroshina	(Turkey) Pemra Özgen (Spain) Georgina García Pérez (Slovenia) Kaja Juvan (Croatia) Tena Lukas
September 3	Montreux Ladies Open; Montreux, Switzerland; Clay $60,000; Singles – Doubles	(Poland) Iga Świątek; 6–2, 6–2	(Belgium) Kimberley Zimmermann	(Colombia) Mariana Duque Mariño (Switzerland) Ylena In-Albon	(Switzerland) Amra Sadiković (Romania) Elena-Gabriela Ruse (Japan) Mari Osaka (Austria) Julia Grabher
September 3	Montreux Ladies Open; Montreux, Switzerland; Clay $60,000; Singles – Doubles	(Romania) Andreea Mitu (Romania) Elena-Gabriela Ruse; 4–6, 6–3, [10–4]	(Brazil) Laura Pigossi (Belgium) Maryna Zanevska	(Colombia) Mariana Duque Mariño (Switzerland) Ylena In-Albon	(Switzerland) Amra Sadiković (Romania) Elena-Gabriela Ruse (Japan) Mari Osaka (Austria) Julia Grabher
September 3	Allianz Cup; Sofia, Bulgaria; Clay $25,000; Singles and doubles draws	(Austria) Barbara Haas; 6–3, 6–2	(Germany) Katharina Hobgarski	(Turkey) Başak Eraydın (Romania) Jaqueline Cristian	(Ukraine) Olga Ianchuk (Russia) Marina Melnikova (Norway) Ulrikke Eikeri (Russia) Anastasia Pribylova
September 3	Allianz Cup; Sofia, Bulgaria; Clay $25,000; Singles and doubles draws	(France) Manon Arcangioli (Belgium) Marie Benoît; 6–4, 7–6^{(7–5)}	(Russia) Amina Anshba (Russia) Polina Monova	(Turkey) Başak Eraydın (Romania) Jaqueline Cristian	(Ukraine) Olga Ianchuk (Russia) Marina Melnikova (Norway) Ulrikke Eikeri (Russia) Anastasia Pribylova
September 3	Prague, Czech Republic; Clay $15,000; Singles and doubles draws	(Germany) Julyette Steur; 7–6^{(7–5)}, 7–6^{(7–3)}	(Czech Republic) Magdaléna Pantůčková	(Czech Republic) Kateřina Vaňková (Czech Republic) Nikola Tomanová	(Canada) Petra Januskova (Czech Republic) Johana Marková (Czech Republic) Gabriela Pantůčková (Romania) Gabriela Nicole Tătăruș
September 3	Prague, Czech Republic; Clay $15,000; Singles and doubles draws	(Czech Republic) Karolína Kubáňová (Czech Republic) Nikola Tomanová; 4–6, 6–3, [10–7]	(Canada) Petra Januskova (Germany) Julyette Steur	(Czech Republic) Kateřina Vaňková (Czech Republic) Nikola Tomanová	(Canada) Petra Januskova (Czech Republic) Johana Marková (Czech Republic) Gabriela Pantůčková (Romania) Gabriela Nicole Tătăruș
September 3	Badenweiler, Germany; Clay $15,000; Singles and doubles draws	(Spain) Rebeka Masarova; 6–2, 7–5	(Switzerland) Nina Stadler	(France) Constance Sibille (Germany) Lara Schmidt	(Switzerland) Karin Kennel (Germany) Carmen Schultheiss (Germany) Anne Knüttel (Denmark) Sofia Samavati
September 3	Badenweiler, Germany; Clay $15,000; Singles and doubles draws	(Netherlands) Dewi Dijkman (Germany) Katharina Hering; 7–6^{(8–6)}, 7–6^{(7–3)}	(Belgium) Catherine Chantraine (Belgium) Chelsea Vanhoutte	(France) Constance Sibille (Germany) Lara Schmidt	(Switzerland) Karin Kennel (Germany) Carmen Schultheiss (Germany) Anne Knüttel (Denmark) Sofia Samavati
September 3	Székesfehérvár, Hungary; Clay $15,000; Singles and doubles draws	(Romania) Ioana Gaspar; 7–5, 6–3	(Hungary) Vanda Lukács	(Russia) Victoria Kan (Hungary) Anastasia Petrova	(Moldova) Anastasia Vdovenco (Hungary) Dorka Drahota-Szabó (Serbia) Tamara Čurović (Poland) Weronika Jasmina Foryś
September 3	Székesfehérvár, Hungary; Clay $15,000; Singles and doubles draws	(Russia) Victoria Kan (Slovakia) Ingrid Vojčináková; 7–5, 6–3	(Serbia) Tamara Čurović (Serbia) Draginja Vuković	(Russia) Victoria Kan (Hungary) Anastasia Petrova	(Moldova) Anastasia Vdovenco (Hungary) Dorka Drahota-Szabó (Serbia) Tamara Čurović (Poland) Weronika Jasmina Foryś
September 3	Trieste, Italy; Clay $15,000; Singles and doubles draws	(Italy) Alice Matteucci; 6–2, 6–2	(Italy) Camilla Scala	(Italy) Martina Spigarelli (Chile) Ivania Martinich	(Greece) Eleni Kordolaimi (Italy) Verena Hofer (Italy) Angelica Raggi (Slovenia) Manca Pislak
September 3	Trieste, Italy; Clay $15,000; Singles and doubles draws	(Italy) Verena Hofer (Italy) Maria Vittoria Viviani; 6–3, 7–5	(Italy) Sara Marcionni (Italy) Maria Aurelia Scotti	(Italy) Martina Spigarelli (Chile) Ivania Martinich	(Greece) Eleni Kordolaimi (Italy) Verena Hofer (Italy) Angelica Raggi (Slovenia) Manca Pislak
September 3	Kyoto, Japan; Hard (indoor) $15,000; Singles and doubles draws	(Japan) Himeno Sakatsume; 3–6, 6–3, 6–1	(Japan) Haruna Arakawa	(Japan) Michika Ozeki (United States) Tori Kinard	(Japan) Mitsumi Kawasaki (Japan) Chie Kezuka (Japan) Minami Shuto (Japan) Rina Saigo
September 3	Kyoto, Japan; Hard (indoor) $15,000; Singles and doubles draws	(Japan) Chinatsu Shimizu (Japan) Minami Shuto; 6–2, 6–4	(Japan) Miyu Nakashima (Japan) Rina Saigo	(Japan) Michika Ozeki (United States) Tori Kinard	(Japan) Mitsumi Kawasaki (Japan) Chie Kezuka (Japan) Minami Shuto (Japan) Rina Saigo
September 3	Luque, Paraguay; Hard $15,000+H; Singles and doubles draws	(Brazil) Gabriela Cé; 7–6^{(7–3)}, 6–2	(Chile) Bárbara Gatica	(Brazil) Eduarda Piai (Guatemala) Kirsten-Andrea Weedon	(Argentina) Julieta Lara Estable (Argentina) Eugenia Ganga (Paraguay) Camila Giangreco Campiz (Guatemala) Melissa Morales
September 3	Luque, Paraguay; Hard $15,000+H; Singles and doubles draws	(Guatemala) Melissa Morales (Guatemala) Kirsten-Andrea Weedon; 7–5, 6–4	(Paraguay) Camila Giangreco Campiz (Paraguay) Sarah Tami-Masi	(Brazil) Eduarda Piai (Guatemala) Kirsten-Andrea Weedon	(Argentina) Julieta Lara Estable (Argentina) Eugenia Ganga (Paraguay) Camila Giangreco Campiz (Guatemala) Melissa Morales
September 3	Santarém, Portugal; Hard $15,000; Singles and doubles draws	(Belgium) Greet Minnen; 7–5, 6–3	(United Kingdom) Samantha Murray	(United States) Dasha Ivanova (United States) Priyanka Shah	(Portugal) Ana Filipa Santos (Portugal) Francisca Jorge (Estonia) Maileen Nuudi (Russia) Natalia Orlova
September 3	Santarém, Portugal; Hard $15,000; Singles and doubles draws	(United States) Dasha Ivanova (United Kingdom) Samantha Murray; 0–6, 6–1, [10–4]	(Italy) Maria Masini (Portugal) Inês Murta	(United States) Dasha Ivanova (United States) Priyanka Shah	(Portugal) Ana Filipa Santos (Portugal) Francisca Jorge (Estonia) Maileen Nuudi (Russia) Natalia Orlova
September 3	Marbella, Spain; Clay $15,000; Singles and doubles draws	(Romania) Gabriela Talabă; 6–2, 6–2	(Bulgaria) Aleksandrina Naydenova	(Spain) Marina Bassols Ribera (France) Clothilde de Bernardi	(Spain) Claudia Hoste Ferrer (Spain) María José Luque Moreno (Russia) Karine Sarkisova (Spain) Júlia Payola
September 3	Marbella, Spain; Clay $15,000; Singles and doubles draws	(Spain) Claudia Hoste Ferrer (Romania) Gabriela Talabă; 6–2, 6–2	(Spain) Ana Lantigua de la Nuez (Spain) Ángeles Moreno Barranquero	(Spain) Marina Bassols Ribera (France) Clothilde de Bernardi	(Spain) Claudia Hoste Ferrer (Spain) María José Luque Moreno (Russia) Karine Sarkisova (Spain) Júlia Payola
September 3	Yeongwol, South Korea; Hard $15,000; Singles and doubles draws	(South Korea) Jeong Su-nam; 6–2, 6–1	(South Korea) Lee So-ra	(South Korea) Ahn Yu-jin (South Korea) Kim Da-bin	(South Korea) Lee Eun-ji (United States) Hanna Chang (South Korea) Back Da-yeon (China) Zhang Ying
September 3	Yeongwol, South Korea; Hard $15,000; Singles and doubles draws	(South Korea) Kim Da-bin (South Korea) Lee So-ra; 6–2, 7–5	(South Korea) Bae Do-hee (South Korea) Hong Seung-yeon	(South Korea) Ahn Yu-jin (South Korea) Kim Da-bin	(South Korea) Lee Eun-ji (United States) Hanna Chang (South Korea) Back Da-yeon (China) Zhang Ying
September 3	Nonthaburi, Thailand; Hard $15,000; Singles and doubles draws	(Thailand) Patcharin Cheapchandej; 3–6, 7–6^{(10–8)}, 6–2	(Chinese Taipei) Lee Hua-chen	(India) Prerna Bhambri (China) Liu Chang	(Thailand) Bunyawi Thamchaiwat (India) Zeel Desai (Chinese Taipei) Lee Ya-hsin (Ukraine) Marianna Zakarlyuk
September 3	Nonthaburi, Thailand; Hard $15,000; Singles and doubles draws	(Thailand) Nudnida Luangnam (Thailand) Bunyawi Thamchaiwat; 6–2, 6–0	(Chinese Taipei) Cho I-hsuan (China) Wang Danni	(India) Prerna Bhambri (China) Liu Chang	(Thailand) Bunyawi Thamchaiwat (India) Zeel Desai (Chinese Taipei) Lee Ya-hsin (Ukraine) Marianna Zakarlyuk
September 3	Monastir, Tunisia; Hard $15,000; Singles and doubles draws	(Spain) Andrea Lázaro García; 7–6^{(7–4)}, 6–4	(France) Caroline Roméo	(Cambodia) Andrea Ka (Sweden) Susanne Celik	(Spain) Paula Arias Manjón (Italy) Claudia Giovine (Norway) Astrid Wanja Brune Olsen (France) Victoria Muntean
September 3	Monastir, Tunisia; Hard $15,000; Singles and doubles draws	(Spain) Paula Arias Manjón (Spain) Andrea Lázaro García; 6–1, 6–0	(Tunisia) Chiraz Bechri (Cambodia) Andrea Ka	(Cambodia) Andrea Ka (Sweden) Susanne Celik	(Spain) Paula Arias Manjón (Italy) Claudia Giovine (Norway) Astrid Wanja Brune Olsen (France) Victoria Muntean
September 10	Open de Biarritz; Biarritz, France; Clay $80,000; Singles – Doubles	(Germany) Tamara Korpatsch; 6–2, 7–5	(Switzerland) Timea Bacsinszky	(Argentina) Paula Ormaechea (Czech Republic) Tereza Smitková	(Slovakia) Rebecca Šramková (Belgium) Ysaline Bonaventure (Ukraine) Anhelina Kalinina (Belgium) Kimberley Zimmermann
September 10	Open de Biarritz; Biarritz, France; Clay $80,000; Singles – Doubles	(Romania) Irina Bara (Russia) Valentyna Ivakhnenko; 6–4, 6–1	(Belgium) Ysaline Bonaventure (Belgium) Hélène Scholsen	(Argentina) Paula Ormaechea (Czech Republic) Tereza Smitková	(Slovakia) Rebecca Šramková (Belgium) Ysaline Bonaventure (Ukraine) Anhelina Kalinina (Belgium) Kimberley Zimmermann
September 10	Pula, Italy; Clay $25,000; Singles and doubles draws	(Croatia) Tereza Mrdeža; 2–6, 7–5, 6–4	(Czech Republic) Anastasia Zarycká	(Romania) Elena-Gabriela Ruse (Switzerland) Lisa Sabino	(Turkey) Başak Eraydın (Italy) Jessica Pieri (Italy) Lucrezia Stefanini (Italy) Deborah Chiesa
September 10	Pula, Italy; Clay $25,000; Singles and doubles draws	(Italy) Martina Colmegna (Italy) Federica Di Sarra; 7–6^{(7–0)}, 6–2	(United Kingdom) Emily Arbuthnott (Germany) Katharina Hobgarski	(Romania) Elena-Gabriela Ruse (Switzerland) Lisa Sabino	(Turkey) Başak Eraydın (Italy) Jessica Pieri (Italy) Lucrezia Stefanini (Italy) Deborah Chiesa
September 10	Varna, Bulgaria; Clay $15,000; Singles and doubles draws	(Romania) Georgia Crăciun; 6–2, 7–5	(Norway) Ulrikke Eikeri	(Russia) Viktoria Kamenskaya (Bulgaria) Dia Evtimova	(Russia) Darya Astakhova (Turkey) İpek Öz (Moldova) Alexandra Perper (Russia) Amina Anshba
September 10	Varna, Bulgaria; Clay $15,000; Singles and doubles draws	(Romania) Gabriela Talabă (Venezuela) Aymet Uzcátegui; 3–6, 7–5, [10–5]	(Turkey) İpek Öz (Turkey) Melis Sezer	(Russia) Viktoria Kamenskaya (Bulgaria) Dia Evtimova	(Russia) Darya Astakhova (Turkey) İpek Öz (Moldova) Alexandra Perper (Russia) Amina Anshba
September 10	Anning, China; Clay $15,000; Singles and doubles draws	(China) Guo Meiqi; 6–1, 6–1	(China) Sun Ziyue	(Chinese Taipei) Pai Ya-yun (China) Sheng Yuqi	(China) Zhao Qianqian (China) He Jiaying (Chinese Taipei) Cho Yi-tsen (China) Lu Jiaxi
September 10	Anning, China; Clay $15,000; Singles and doubles draws	(China) Liu Siqi (China) Lu Jiaxi; 5–7, 6–4, [10–8]	(China) Dong Hongding (China) Sun Ziyue	(Chinese Taipei) Pai Ya-yun (China) Sheng Yuqi	(China) Zhao Qianqian (China) He Jiaying (Chinese Taipei) Cho Yi-tsen (China) Lu Jiaxi
September 10	Frýdek-Místek, Czech Republic; Clay $15,000; Singles and doubles draws	(Poland) Marta Leśniak; 6–7^{(6–8)}, 6–2, 6–3	(Czech Republic) Gabriela Pantůčková	(Czech Republic) Magdaléna Pantůčková (Czech Republic) Johana Marková	(Canada) Petra Januskova (Ukraine) Yuliya Lysa (Austria) Melanie Klaffner (Czech Republic) Anna Sisková
September 10	Frýdek-Místek, Czech Republic; Clay $15,000; Singles and doubles draws	(Czech Republic) Karolína Kubáňová (Czech Republic) Nikola Tomanová; 6–1, 6–3	(Canada) Petra Januskova (Russia) Anna Ukolova	(Czech Republic) Magdaléna Pantůčková (Czech Republic) Johana Marková	(Canada) Petra Januskova (Ukraine) Yuliya Lysa (Austria) Melanie Klaffner (Czech Republic) Anna Sisková
September 10	Cairo, Egypt; Clay $15,000; Singles and doubles draws	(Ecuador) Charlotte Römer; 6–3, 6–4	(Egypt) Lamis Alhussein Abdel Aziz	(Russia) Anna Morgina (Sweden) Fanny Östlund	(Romania) Gabriela Nicole Tătăruș (Slovakia) Viktória Morvayová (Germany) Julyette Steur (Russia) Anna Ureke
September 10	Cairo, Egypt; Clay $15,000; Singles and doubles draws	(Russia) Anna Morgina (Russia) Elina Nepliy; 7–5, 6–1	(Romania) Gabriela Nicole Tătăruș (Belgium) Chelsea Vanhoutte	(Russia) Anna Morgina (Sweden) Fanny Östlund	(Romania) Gabriela Nicole Tătăruș (Slovakia) Viktória Morvayová (Germany) Julyette Steur (Russia) Anna Ureke
September 10	Almaty, Kazakhstan; Clay $15,000; Singles and doubles draws	(Ukraine) Maryna Chernyshova; 6–4, 6–3	(Russia) Daria Lodikova	(Israel) Vlada Ekshibarova (Russia) Vlada Koval	(Croatia) Oleksandra Oliynykova (Kazakhstan) Dariya Detkovskaya (Kazakhstan) Yekaterina Dmitrichenko (Uzbekistan) Albina Khabibulina
September 10	Almaty, Kazakhstan; Clay $15,000; Singles and doubles draws	(Ukraine) Maryna Chernyshova (Israel) Vlada Ekshibarova; 7–6^{(7–3)}, 6–2	(Uzbekistan) Albina Khabibulina (Kyrgyzstan) Ksenia Palkina	(Israel) Vlada Ekshibarova (Russia) Vlada Koval	(Croatia) Oleksandra Oliynykova (Kazakhstan) Dariya Detkovskaya (Kazakhstan) Yekaterina Dmitrichenko (Uzbekistan) Albina Khabibulina
September 10	Montemor-o-Novo, Portugal; Hard $15,000; Singles and doubles draws	(United States) Dasha Ivanova; 7–5, 6–3	(Switzerland) Nina Stadler	(Chinese Taipei) Lee Pei-chi (Netherlands) Arianne Hartono	(Portugal) Inês Murta (France) Estelle Cascino (Bulgaria) Julia Stamatova (Georgia (country)) Mariam Bolkvadze
September 10	Montemor-o-Novo, Portugal; Hard $15,000; Singles and doubles draws	(Portugal) Inês Murta (Switzerland) Nina Stadler; 6–1, 6–0	(Portugal) Francisca Jorge (Portugal) Lúcia Quitério	(Chinese Taipei) Lee Pei-chi (Netherlands) Arianne Hartono	(Portugal) Inês Murta (France) Estelle Cascino (Bulgaria) Julia Stamatova (Georgia (country)) Mariam Bolkvadze
September 10	Ceuta, Spain; Hard $15,000; Singles and doubles draws	(Bulgaria) Aleksandrina Naydenova; 6–1, 4–6, 6–1	(Spain) Lucía Cortez Llorca	(Spain) María José Luque Moreno (Spain) Claudia Hoste Ferrer	(Bolivia) Noelia Zeballos (Russia) Victoria Mikhaylova (Spain) Olga Parres Azcoitia (Netherlands) Lara Panfilov
September 10	Ceuta, Spain; Hard $15,000; Singles and doubles draws	(Spain) Claudia Hoste Ferrer (Spain) María José Luque Moreno; 7–5, 6–1	(Italy) Maria Masini (Spain) Olga Parres Azcoitia	(Spain) María José Luque Moreno (Spain) Claudia Hoste Ferrer	(Bolivia) Noelia Zeballos (Russia) Victoria Mikhaylova (Spain) Olga Parres Azcoitia (Netherlands) Lara Panfilov
September 10	Monastir, Tunisia; Hard $15,000; Singles and doubles draws	(Spain) Andrea Lázaro García; 6–0, 6–2	(France) Victoria Muntean	(Spain) Paula Arias Manjón (Italy) Claudia Giovine	(Italy) Claudia Coppola (France) Joséphine Boualem (Romania) Andreea Prisăcariu (Tunisia) Chiraz Bechri
September 10	Monastir, Tunisia; Hard $15,000; Singles and doubles draws	(Spain) Paula Arias Manjón (Spain) Andrea Lázaro García; 7–5, 6–0	(Venezuela) Nadia Echeverría Alam (United Kingdom) Anna Popescu	(Spain) Paula Arias Manjón (Italy) Claudia Giovine	(Italy) Claudia Coppola (France) Joséphine Boualem (Romania) Andreea Prisăcariu (Tunisia) Chiraz Bechri
September 17	L'Open 35 de Saint-Malo; Saint-Malo, France; Clay $60,000+H; Singles – Doubles	(Russia) Liudmila Samsonova; 6–0, 6–2	(Ukraine) Katarina Zavatska	(Paraguay) Verónica Cepede Royg (Romania) Irina Bara	(Liechtenstein) Kathinka von Deichmann (Switzerland) Timea Bacsinszky (Latvia) Diāna Marcinkēviča (Georgia (country)) Ekaterine Gorgodze
September 17	L'Open 35 de Saint-Malo; Saint-Malo, France; Clay $60,000+H; Singles – Doubles	(Spain) Cristina Bucșa (Colombia) María Fernanda Herazo; 4–6, 6–1, [10–8]	(Romania) Alexandra Cadanțu (Latvia) Diāna Marcinkēviča	(Paraguay) Verónica Cepede Royg (Romania) Irina Bara	(Liechtenstein) Kathinka von Deichmann (Switzerland) Timea Bacsinszky (Latvia) Diāna Marcinkēviča (Georgia (country)) Ekaterine Gorgodze
September 17	Cairns, Australia; Hard $25,000; Singles and doubles draws	(Australia) Astra Sharma; 0–6, 7–6^{(7–5)}, 6–1	(Australia) Destanee Aiava	(Australia) Alison Bai (Australia) Kaylah McPhee	(Australia) Kimberly Birrell (Australia) Seone Mendez (Slovakia) Zuzana Zlochová (United Kingdom) Jodie Anna Burrage
September 17	Cairns, Australia; Hard $25,000; Singles and doubles draws	(Australia) Naiktha Bains (China) Xu Shilin; 6–1, 7–6^{(9–7)}	(New Zealand) Erin Routliffe (Australia) Astra Sharma	(Australia) Alison Bai (Australia) Kaylah McPhee	(Australia) Kimberly Birrell (Australia) Seone Mendez (Slovakia) Zuzana Zlochová (United Kingdom) Jodie Anna Burrage
September 17	Izida Cup; Dobrich, Bulgaria; Clay $25,000; Singles and doubles draws	(Germany) Caroline Werner; 6–4, 3–6, 7–5	(Italy) Giulia Gatto-Monticone	(Romania) Irina Fetecău (Hungary) Anna Bondár	(Poland) Katarzyna Piter (Romania) Jaqueline Cristian (Norway) Ulrikke Eikeri (Romania) Nicoleta Dascălu
September 17	Izida Cup; Dobrich, Bulgaria; Clay $25,000; Singles and doubles draws	(Romania) Cristina Dinu (Venezuela) Aymet Uzcátegui; 7–6^{(7–3)}, 6–2	(Romania) Jaqueline Cristian (Romania) Elena-Gabriela Ruse	(Romania) Irina Fetecău (Hungary) Anna Bondár	(Poland) Katarzyna Piter (Romania) Jaqueline Cristian (Norway) Ulrikke Eikeri (Romania) Nicoleta Dascălu
September 17	Pula, Italy; Clay $25,000; Singles and doubles draws	(Czech Republic) Anastasia Zarycká; 6–3, 7–6^{(7–4)}	(Italy) Martina Caregaro	(Slovakia) Kristína Kučová (Switzerland) Ylena In-Albon	(Germany) Lena Rüffer (Italy) Stefania Rubini (Italy) Federica Bilardo (Italy) Anastasia Grymalska
September 17	Pula, Italy; Clay $25,000; Singles and doubles draws	(Italy) Federica Di Sarra (Italy) Anastasia Grymalska; 7–6^{(7–3)}, 6–2	(Italy) Deborah Chiesa (Italy) Tatiana Pieri	(Slovakia) Kristína Kučová (Switzerland) Ylena In-Albon	(Germany) Lena Rüffer (Italy) Stefania Rubini (Italy) Federica Bilardo (Italy) Anastasia Grymalska
September 17	Royal Cup NLB Montenegro; Podgorica, Montenegro; Clay $25,000; Singles and doubles draws	(Czech Republic) Jesika Malečková; 6–2, 6–0	(Croatia) Tena Lukas	(Austria) Barbara Haas (Austria) Julia Grabher	(Czech Republic) Miriam Kolodziejová (Belgium) Hélène Scholsen (Romania) Raluca Georgiana Șerban (Belarus) Yuliya Hatouka
September 17	Royal Cup NLB Montenegro; Podgorica, Montenegro; Clay $25,000; Singles and doubles draws	(Czech Republic) Miriam Kolodziejová (Slovenia) Nina Potočnik; 2–6, 6–3, [10–0]	(Bosnia and Herzegovina) Nefisa Berberović (Slovenia) Veronika Erjavec	(Austria) Barbara Haas (Austria) Julia Grabher	(Czech Republic) Miriam Kolodziejová (Belgium) Hélène Scholsen (Romania) Raluca Georgiana Șerban (Belarus) Yuliya Hatouka
September 17	Lisbon, Portugal; Hard $25,000; Singles and doubles draws	(Netherlands) Lesley Kerkhove; 6–2, 7–6^{(7–3)}	(Turkey) Pemra Özgen	(France) Tessah Andrianjafitrimo (Hungary) Gréta Arn	(Oman) Fatma Al-Nabhani (Georgia (country)) Mariam Bolkvadze (Belarus) Shalimar Talbi (Spain) Nuria Párrizas Díaz
September 17	Lisbon, Portugal; Hard $25,000; Singles and doubles draws	(Finland) Emma Laine (United Kingdom) Samantha Murray; 7–5, 6–4	(Netherlands) Michaëlla Krajicek (Czech Republic) Tereza Martincová	(France) Tessah Andrianjafitrimo (Hungary) Gréta Arn	(Oman) Fatma Al-Nabhani (Georgia (country)) Mariam Bolkvadze (Belarus) Shalimar Talbi (Spain) Nuria Párrizas Díaz
September 17	Lubbock, United States; Hard $25,000; Singles and doubles draws	(Canada) Rebecca Marino; 6–4, 6–1	(United States) Robin Anderson	(United States) Hayley Carter (United States) Emina Bektas	(United States) Sanaz Marand (Mexico) Victoria Rodríguez (Colombia) Camila Osorio (Italy) Bianca Turati
September 17	Lubbock, United States; Hard $25,000; Singles and doubles draws	(United Kingdom) Naomi Broady (Argentina) Nadia Podoroska; 3–6, 6–2, [10–8]	(Montenegro) Vladica Babić (United States) Hayley Carter	(United States) Hayley Carter (United States) Emina Bektas	(United States) Sanaz Marand (Mexico) Victoria Rodríguez (Colombia) Camila Osorio (Italy) Bianca Turati
September 17	Buenos Aires, Argentina; Clay $15,000; Singles and doubles draws	(Chile) Fernanda Brito; 6–1, 6–4	(Argentina) Catalina Pella	(Argentina) Carla Lucero (Argentina) Jazmín Ortenzi	(Argentina) Julieta Lara Estable (Argentina) Sofía Luini (Paraguay) Camila Giangreco Campiz (Argentina) Eugenia Ganga
September 17	Buenos Aires, Argentina; Clay $15,000; Singles and doubles draws	(Chile) Fernanda Brito (Paraguay) Camila Giangreco Campiz; 7–5, 7–6^{(7–2)}	(Argentina) Julieta Lara Estable (Argentina) Catalina Pella	(Argentina) Carla Lucero (Argentina) Jazmín Ortenzi	(Argentina) Julieta Lara Estable (Argentina) Sofía Luini (Paraguay) Camila Giangreco Campiz (Argentina) Eugenia Ganga
September 17	Anning, China; Clay $15,000; Singles and doubles draws	(Chinese Taipei) Lee Hua-chen; 6–2, 6–2	(China) Yang Ziyi	(China) Sheng Yuqi (India) Sowjanya Bavisetti	(China) Liu Meiting (China) Guo Meiqi (China) Lu Jiaxi (China) Sun Ziyue
September 17	Anning, China; Clay $15,000; Singles and doubles draws	(India) Sowjanya Bavisetti (China) Wang Danni; 7–6^{(7–4)}, 7–5	(Chinese Taipei) Cho I-hsuan (Chinese Taipei) Cho Yi-tsen	(China) Sheng Yuqi (India) Sowjanya Bavisetti	(China) Liu Meiting (China) Guo Meiqi (China) Lu Jiaxi (China) Sun Ziyue
September 17	Cairo, Egypt; Clay $15,000; Singles and doubles draws	(Egypt) Sandra Samir; 6–0, 2–1, ret.	(Russia) Anna Ureke	(Ecuador) Charlotte Römer (Russia) Anna Morgina	(United States) Joelle Kissell (Italy) Costanza Traversi (Slovakia) Viktória Morvayová (Egypt) Lamis Alhussein Abdel Aziz
September 17	Cairo, Egypt; Clay $15,000; Singles and doubles draws	(United States) Joelle Kissell (Ecuador) Charlotte Römer; 7–6^{(7–3)}, 6–2	(Egypt) Farah Abdel-Wahab (Egypt) Lamis Alhussein Abdel Aziz	(Ecuador) Charlotte Römer (Russia) Anna Morgina	(United States) Joelle Kissell (Italy) Costanza Traversi (Slovakia) Viktória Morvayová (Egypt) Lamis Alhussein Abdel Aziz
September 17	Batumi Ladies Open; Batumi, Georgia; Hard $15,000; Singles and doubles draws	(Russia) Daria Kudashova; 5–7, 6–0, 6–3	(Russia) Gyulnara Nazarova	(Belarus) Anna Kubareva (Russia) Valeriya Urzhumova	(Georgia (country)) Lana Kentchiashvili (Armenia) Ani Amiraghyan (Belarus) Sadafmoh Tolibova (Hungary) Csilla Argyelán
September 17	Batumi Ladies Open; Batumi, Georgia; Hard $15,000; Singles and doubles draws	(United Kingdom) Aleksandra Pitak (United Kingdom) Katarzyna Pitak; 6–0, 4–1, ret.	(Russia) Aleksandra Kuznetsova (Russia) Gyulnara Nazarova	(Belarus) Anna Kubareva (Russia) Valeriya Urzhumova	(Georgia (country)) Lana Kentchiashvili (Armenia) Ani Amiraghyan (Belarus) Sadafmoh Tolibova (Hungary) Csilla Argyelán
September 17	Shymkent, Kazakhstan; Clay $15,000; Singles and doubles draws	(Kyrgyzstan) Ksenia Palkina; 1–0, ret.	(Ukraine) Maryna Chernyshova	(Russia) Maria Shusharina (Russia) Ulyana Ayzatulina	(Kazakhstan) Dariya Detkovskaya (Russia) Vlada Koval (Russia) Daria Lodikova (Kazakhstan) Yekaterina Dmitrichenko
September 17	Shymkent, Kazakhstan; Clay $15,000; Singles and doubles draws	(Poland) Anna Hertel (Russia) Kamilla Rakhimova; 6–0, 7–6^{(7–0)}	(Russia) Ulyana Ayzatulina (Russia) Anna Iakovleva	(Russia) Maria Shusharina (Russia) Ulyana Ayzatulina	(Kazakhstan) Dariya Detkovskaya (Russia) Vlada Koval (Russia) Daria Lodikova (Kazakhstan) Yekaterina Dmitrichenko
September 17	Monastir, Tunisia; Hard $15,000; Singles and doubles draws	(Italy) Claudia Giovine; 6–3, 6–3	(Sweden) Susanne Celik	(Romania) Andreea Prisăcariu (United States) Madison Westby	(Italy) Giulia Brighi (France) Joséphine Boualem (India) Bhuvana Kalva (Netherlands) Merel Hoedt
September 17	Monastir, Tunisia; Hard $15,000; Singles and doubles draws	(Italy) Martina Biagianti (Italy) Claudia Giovine; 6–1, 6–2	(Venezuela) Nadia Echeverría Alam (United Kingdom) Anna Popescu	(Romania) Andreea Prisăcariu (United States) Madison Westby	(Italy) Giulia Brighi (France) Joséphine Boualem (India) Bhuvana Kalva (Netherlands) Merel Hoedt
September 17	Antalya, Turkey; Hard $15,000; Singles and doubles draws	(Austria) Sinja Kraus; 3–6, 6–4, 7–6^{(8–6)}	(Turkey) Cemre Anıl	(Sweden) Jacqueline Cabaj Awad (Switzerland) Romina Oprandi	(Romania) Luminița Tutunaru (Bolivia) Noelia Zeballos (Slovakia) Bianca Behúlová (Russia) Daria Nazarkina
September 17	Antalya, Turkey; Hard $15,000; Singles and doubles draws	(Russia) Daria Nazarkina (Ukraine) Anastasiya Poplavska; 6–3, 6–1	(Turkey) Cemre Anıl (Turkey) İlay Yörük	(Sweden) Jacqueline Cabaj Awad (Switzerland) Romina Oprandi	(Romania) Luminița Tutunaru (Bolivia) Noelia Zeballos (Slovakia) Bianca Behúlová (Russia) Daria Nazarkina
September 24	Darwin Tennis International; Darwin, Australia; Hard $60,000; Singles – Doubles	(Australia) Kimberly Birrell; 6–3, 6–3	(Australia) Ellen Perez	(Slovakia) Zuzana Zlochová (Australia) Naiktha Bains	(Australia) Olivia Rogowska (France) Irina Ramialison (Hong Kong) Zhang Ling (Japan) Haruka Kaji
September 24	Darwin Tennis International; Darwin, Australia; Hard $60,000; Singles – Doubles	(India) Rutuja Bhosale (Japan) Hiroko Kuwata; 6–2, 6–4	(Australia) Kimberly Birrell (United Kingdom) Katy Dunne	(Slovakia) Zuzana Zlochová (Australia) Naiktha Bains	(Australia) Olivia Rogowska (France) Irina Ramialison (Hong Kong) Zhang Ling (Japan) Haruka Kaji
September 24	BBVA Open Ciudad de Valencia; Valencia, Spain; Clay $60,000+H; Singles – Doubles	(Spain) Paula Badosa Gibert; 6–1, 4–6, 6–2	(Spain) Aliona Bolsova Zadoinov	(Slovakia) Rebecca Šramková (Turkey) Başak Eraydın	(Italy) Jasmine Paolini (Argentina) Paula Ormaechea (Belgium) Maryna Zanevska (Serbia) Nina Stojanović
September 24	BBVA Open Ciudad de Valencia; Valencia, Spain; Clay $60,000+H; Singles – Doubles	(Russia) Irina Khromacheva (Serbia) Nina Stojanović; 6–1, 6–4	(Greece) Valentini Grammatikopoulou (Mexico) Renata Zarazúa	(Slovakia) Rebecca Šramková (Turkey) Başak Eraydın	(Italy) Jasmine Paolini (Argentina) Paula Ormaechea (Belgium) Maryna Zanevska (Serbia) Nina Stojanović
September 24	Central Coast Pro Tennis Open; Templeton, United States; Hard $60,000; Singles – Doubles	(United States) Asia Muhammad; 2–6, 6–4, 6–3	(Bulgaria) Sesil Karatantcheva	(United States) Grace Min (United States) Madison Brengle	(Russia) Sofya Zhuk (Serbia) Jovana Jakšić (Switzerland) Amra Sadiković (United States) Maria Sanchez
September 24	Central Coast Pro Tennis Open; Templeton, United States; Hard $60,000; Singles – Doubles	(United States) Asia Muhammad (United States) Maria Sanchez; 6–7^{(4–7)}, 6–2, [10–8]	(United States) Quinn Gleason (Brazil) Luisa Stefani	(United States) Grace Min (United States) Madison Brengle	(Russia) Sofya Zhuk (Serbia) Jovana Jakšić (Switzerland) Amra Sadiković (United States) Maria Sanchez
September 24	Clermont-Ferrand, France; Hard (indoor) $25,000; Singles and doubles draws	(Netherlands) Lesley Kerkhove; 6–3, 4–6, 6–4	(France) Clara Burel	(Hungary) Gréta Arn (France) Myrtille Georges	(Switzerland) Tess Sugnaux (France) Shérazad Reix (Turkey) Ayla Aksu (Netherlands) Richèl Hogenkamp
September 24	Clermont-Ferrand, France; Hard (indoor) $25,000; Singles and doubles draws	(Switzerland) Leonie Küng (Bulgaria) Isabella Shinikova; 6–2, 7–5	(France) Manon Arcangioli (France) Shérazad Reix	(Hungary) Gréta Arn (France) Myrtille Georges	(Switzerland) Tess Sugnaux (France) Shérazad Reix (Turkey) Ayla Aksu (Netherlands) Richèl Hogenkamp
September 24	Pula, Italy; Clay $25,000; Singles and doubles draws	(Germany) Katharina Hobgarski; 7–6^{(7–3)}, 6–2	(Brazil) Carolina Alves	(Russia) Liudmila Samsonova (Switzerland) Ylena In-Albon	(Bulgaria) Elitsa Kostova (Ukraine) Ganna Poznikhirenko (Greece) Eleni Kordolaimi (Italy) Deborah Chiesa
September 24	Pula, Italy; Clay $25,000; Singles and doubles draws	(Germany) Tayisiya Morderger (Germany) Yana Morderger; 6–7^{(0–7)}, 7–6^{(11–9)}, [12–10]	(China) Cao Siqi (China) Ma Shuyue	(Russia) Liudmila Samsonova (Switzerland) Ylena In-Albon	(Bulgaria) Elitsa Kostova (Ukraine) Ganna Poznikhirenko (Greece) Eleni Kordolaimi (Italy) Deborah Chiesa
September 24	Óbidos, Portugal; Carpet $25,000; Singles and doubles draws	(Italy) Giulia Gatto-Monticone; 7–5, 6–4	(Belgium) Greet Minnen	(Poland) Urszula Radwańska (Georgia (country)) Mariam Bolkvadze	(Poland) Katarzyna Piter (Turkey) Berfu Cengiz (Turkey) Pemra Özgen (Latvia) Diāna Marcinkēviča
September 24	Óbidos, Portugal; Carpet $25,000; Singles and doubles draws	(Poland) Katarzyna Piter (Russia) Valeria Savinykh; 6–3, 6–2	(Georgia (country)) Mariam Bolkvadze (Portugal) Inês Murta	(Poland) Urszula Radwańska (Georgia (country)) Mariam Bolkvadze	(Poland) Katarzyna Piter (Turkey) Berfu Cengiz (Turkey) Pemra Özgen (Latvia) Diāna Marcinkēviča
September 24	Anning, China; Clay $15,000; Singles and doubles draws	(Chinese Taipei) Lee Hua-chen; 6–0, 6–1	(China) Sun Xuliu	(China) Du Zhima (China) Ni Ma Zhuoma	(Chinese Taipei) Pai Ya-yun (China) Guo Meiqi (China) Zheng Qinwen (China) Yang Ziyi
September 24	Anning, China; Clay $15,000; Singles and doubles draws	(China) Sun Xuliu (China) Zhao Qianqian; 6–4, 3–6, [10–6]	(Chinese Taipei) Cho I-hsuan (Chinese Taipei) Cho Yi-tsen	(China) Du Zhima (China) Ni Ma Zhuoma	(Chinese Taipei) Pai Ya-yun (China) Guo Meiqi (China) Zheng Qinwen (China) Yang Ziyi
September 24	Brno, Czech Republic; Clay $15,000; Singles and doubles draws	(Bosnia and Herzegovina) Nefisa Berberović; 7–6^{(8–6)}, 6–4	(Czech Republic) Diana Šumová	(Czech Republic) Barbora Miklová (Czech Republic) Johana Marková	(Luxembourg) Eléonora Molinaro (Czech Republic) Monika Svobodová (Austria) Melanie Klaffner (Czech Republic) Anastasia Dețiuc
September 24	Brno, Czech Republic; Clay $15,000; Singles and doubles draws	(Czech Republic) Kristýna Hrabalová (Czech Republic) Nikola Tomanová; 6–2, 6–4	(Czech Republic) Anastasia Dețiuc (Canada) Petra Januskova	(Czech Republic) Barbora Miklová (Czech Republic) Johana Marková	(Luxembourg) Eléonora Molinaro (Czech Republic) Monika Svobodová (Austria) Melanie Klaffner (Czech Republic) Anastasia Dețiuc
September 24	Cairo, Egypt; Clay $15,000; Singles and doubles draws	(Italy) Michele Alexandra Zmău; 6–3, 4–6, 6–4	(Ecuador) Charlotte Römer	(Egypt) Sandra Samir (Egypt) Lamis Alhussein Abdel Aziz	(Russia) Anna Ureke (Slovakia) Viktória Morvayová (Australia) Jelena Stojanovic (Netherlands) Dominique Karregat
September 24	Cairo, Egypt; Clay $15,000; Singles and doubles draws	(Egypt) Sandra Samir (Italy) Michele Alexandra Zmău; 6–2, 6–1	(Egypt) Yasmin Ezzat (Ecuador) Charlotte Römer	(Egypt) Sandra Samir (Egypt) Lamis Alhussein Abdel Aziz	(Russia) Anna Ureke (Slovakia) Viktória Morvayová (Australia) Jelena Stojanovic (Netherlands) Dominique Karregat
September 24	Shymkent, Kazakhstan; Clay $15,000; Singles and doubles draws	(Russia) Daria Lodikova; 7–6^{(7–5)}, 6–4	(Kazakhstan) Zhibek Kulambayeva	(Kazakhstan) Yekaterina Dmitrichenko (Russia) Sofia Dmitrieva	(Moldova) Vitalia Stamat (Croatia) Oleksandra Oliynykova (Russia) Noel Saidenova (Russia) Maria Shusharina
September 24	Shymkent, Kazakhstan; Clay $15,000; Singles and doubles draws	(Kazakhstan) Yekaterina Dmitrichenko (Russia) Anna Iakovleva; 6–4, 6–3	(Uzbekistan) Yasmina Karimjanova (Uzbekistan) Sevil Yuldasheva	(Kazakhstan) Yekaterina Dmitrichenko (Russia) Sofia Dmitrieva	(Moldova) Vitalia Stamat (Croatia) Oleksandra Oliynykova (Russia) Noel Saidenova (Russia) Maria Shusharina
September 24	Melilla, Spain; Clay $15,000; Singles and doubles draws	(Romania) Ioana Loredana Roșca; 6–0, 6–2	(Spain) Júlia Payola	(Belgium) Catherine Chantraine (Germany) Linda Prenkovic	(Italy) Nuria Brancaccio (Spain) Marina Benito (Chile) Ivania Martinich (Romania) Alexandra Damaschin
September 24	Melilla, Spain; Clay $15,000; Singles and doubles draws	(Spain) Olga Parres Azcoitia (Romania) Ioana Loredana Roșca; 6–2, 6–2	(Belgium) Catherine Chantraine (Germany) Linda Prenkovic	(Belgium) Catherine Chantraine (Germany) Linda Prenkovic	(Italy) Nuria Brancaccio (Spain) Marina Benito (Chile) Ivania Martinich (Romania) Alexandra Damaschin
September 24	Monastir, Tunisia; Hard $15,000; Singles and doubles draws	(Serbia) Barbara Bonić; 4–6, 6–1, 6–3	(Tunisia) Chiraz Bechri	(Canada) Maria Tanasescu (Italy) Lisa Pigato	(United Kingdom) Anna Popescu (Russia) Polina Kozyreva (France) Pauline Courcoux (Italy) Giulia Crescenzi
September 24	Monastir, Tunisia; Hard $15,000; Singles and doubles draws	(Tunisia) Chiraz Bechri (Serbia) Barbara Bonić; 6–4, 6–4	(Venezuela) Nadia Echeverría Alam (United Kingdom) Anna Popescu	(Canada) Maria Tanasescu (Italy) Lisa Pigato	(United Kingdom) Anna Popescu (Russia) Polina Kozyreva (France) Pauline Courcoux (Italy) Giulia Crescenzi
September 24	Antalya, Turkey; Hard $15,000; Singles and doubles draws	(Switzerland) Romina Oprandi; 6–0, 6–2	(Russia) Daria Nazarkina	(Switzerland) Bojana Klincov (Turkey) Selin Övünç	(Greece) Eleni Daniilidou (Finland) Oona Orpana (Sweden) Julita Saner (Turkey) Cemre Anıl
September 24	Antalya, Turkey; Hard $15,000; Singles and doubles draws	(Turkey) Cemre Anıl (Turkey) Melis Sezer; 6–2, 7–5	(Latvia) Alise Čerņecka (Finland) Oona Orpana	(Switzerland) Bojana Klincov (Turkey) Selin Övünç	(Greece) Eleni Daniilidou (Finland) Oona Orpana (Sweden) Julita Saner (Turkey) Cemre Anıl
September 24	Chornomorsk, Ukraine; Clay $15,000; Singles and doubles draws	(Ukraine) Anastasiya Shoshyna; 6–4, 6–1	(Serbia) Bojana Marinković	(Moldova) Alexandra Perper (Moldova) Anastasia Vdovenco	(Ukraine) Nadiya Kolb (France) Carole Monnet (Ukraine) Helen Ploskina (Hungary) Vanda Lukács
September 24	Chornomorsk, Ukraine; Clay $15,000; Singles and doubles draws	(Ukraine) Maryna Kolb (Ukraine) Nadiya Kolb; 6–4, 6–4	(Moldova) Alexandra Perper (Moldova) Anastasia Vdovenco	(Moldova) Alexandra Perper (Moldova) Anastasia Vdovenco	(Ukraine) Nadiya Kolb (France) Carole Monnet (Ukraine) Helen Ploskina (Hungary) Vanda Lukács
September 24	Hilton Head Island, United States; Clay $15,000; Singles and doubles draws	(Italy) Bianca Turati; 7–6^{(7–0)}, 6–2	(Czech Republic) Michaela Bayerlová	(Lithuania) Justina Mikulskytė (United States) Rasheeda McAdoo	(United States) Allura Zamarripa (Uzbekistan) Komola Umarova (United States) Peyton Stearns (United States) Nadja Gilchrist
September 24	Hilton Head Island, United States; Clay $15,000; Singles and doubles draws	(Chile) Bárbara Gatica (Brazil) Rebeca Pereira; 7–6^{(7–2)}, 3–6, [11–9]	(United States) Allura Zamarripa (United States) Maribella Zamarripa	(Lithuania) Justina Mikulskytė (United States) Rasheeda McAdoo	(United States) Allura Zamarripa (Uzbekistan) Komola Umarova (United States) Peyton Stearns (United States) Nadja Gilchrist
