= 2018 ITS Cup – Doubles =

Doubles
- 2018 ITS Cup

Final
- Champions: (Czech Republic) Petra Krejsová (Czech Republic) Jesika Malečková
- Runners-up: (Czech Republic) Lucie Hradecká (Netherlands) Michaëlla Krajicek
- Score: 6–2, 6–1

Events
Singles	Doubles
← 2017 ·	ITS Cup	· 2019 →

Amandine Hesse and Victoria Rodríguez were the defending champions, but chose not to participate.

Petra Krejsová and Jesika Malečková won the title after defeating Lucie Hradecká and Michaëlla Krajicek 6–2, 6–1 in the final.

== Seeds ==
1. (Czech Republic) Barbora Štefková / (Czech Republic) Renata Voráčová (semifinals)
2. (Czech Republic) Lucie Hradecká / (Netherlands) Michaëlla Krajicek (final)
3. (Czech Republic) Petra Krejsová / (Czech Republic) Jesika Malečková (champions)
4. (Russia) Maria Marfutina / (Czech Republic) Anastasia Zarycká (quarterfinals)

== Draw ==
=== Key ===
- Q = Qualifier
- WC = Wild card
- LL = Lucky loser
- Alt = Alternate
- SE = Special exempt
- PR = Protected ranking
- ITF = ITF entry
- JE = Junior exempt
- w/o = Walkover
- r = Retired
- d = Defaulted
- SR = Special ranking

=== Draw ===
First round
1	(Czech Republic) B Štefková (Czech Republic) R Voráčová	6	2	[10]
(Russia) Ana Pribylova (Russia) Ann Pribylova	4	6	[4]
(Czech Republic) N Tomanová (Czech Republic) V Žovincová	3	3
(Belgium) A-S Mestach (United States) K Stewart	6	6
3	(Czech Republic) P Krejsová (Czech Republic) J Malečková	7	7^{7}
(Czech Republic) A Dețiuc (Czech Republic) M Kolodziejová	5	6^{2}
(Slovakia) M Hončová (Ukraine) A Kalinina	6	6
WC	(Ukraine) A Shoshyna (Moldova) I Tishchenko	2	4
WC	(Switzerland) N Gadient (Russia) S Madina	1	2
(Croatia) T Lukas (Croatia) T Mrdeža	6	6
(Hungary) Á Bukta (France) V Muntean	6	4	[7]
4	(Russia) M Marfutina (Czech Republic) A Zarycká	2	6	[10]
(Austria) P König (Czech Republic) M Pantůčková	3	6	[10]
WC	(Czech Republic) N Břečková (Czech Republic) L Kareisová	6	1	[3]
(Bosnia and Herzegovina) A Husarić (Finland) E Laine	3	1
2	(Czech Republic) L Hradecká (Netherlands) M Krajicek	6	6

Quarterfinals
1	(Czech Republic) B Štefková (Czech Republic) R Voráčová	6	7
(Belgium) A-S Mestach (United States) K Stewart	4	5
3	(Czech Republic) P Krejsová (Czech Republic) J Malečková	6	6
(Slovakia) M Hončová (Ukraine) A Kalinina	1	4
(Croatia) T Lukas (Croatia) T Mrdeža	7	6
4	(Russia) M Marfutina (Czech Republic) A Zarycká	5	2
(Austria) P König (Czech Republic) M Pantůčková	1	5
2	(Czech Republic) L Hradecká (Netherlands) M Krajicek	6	7

Semifinals
1	(Czech Republic) B Štefková (Czech Republic) R Voráčová	4	6	[5]
3	(Czech Republic) P Krejsová (Czech Republic) J Malečková	6	4	[10]
(Croatia) T Lukas (Croatia) T Mrdeža	4	1
2	(Czech Republic) L Hradecká (Netherlands) M Krajicek	6	6

Final
3	(Czech Republic) P Krejsová (Czech Republic) J Malečková	6	6
2	(Czech Republic) L Hradecká (Netherlands) M Krajicek	2	1
