= 2018 ITS Cup – Singles =

Singles
- 2018 ITS Cup

Final
- Champion: (France) Fiona Ferro
- Runner-up: (Czech Republic) Karolína Muchová
- Score: 6–4, 6–4

Events
Singles	Doubles
← 2017 ·	ITS Cup	· 2019 →

Bernarda Pera was the defending champion, but chose not to participate.

Fiona Ferro won the title, defeating Karolína Muchová in the final, 6–4, 6–4.

== Seeds ==
1. (Czech Republic) Kateřina Siniaková (second round)
2. (Ukraine) Kateryna Kozlova (quarterfinals)
3. (Czech Republic) Kristýna Plíšková (first round)
4. (Ukraine) Anhelina Kalinina (quarterfinals)
5. (France) Fiona Ferro (champion)
6. (Netherlands) Richèl Hogenkamp (withdrew)
7. (Czech Republic) Barbora Krejčíková (first round)
8. (Slovakia) Michaela Hončová (second round)

== Draw ==
=== Key ===
- Q = Qualifier
- WC = Wild card
- LL = Lucky loser
- Alt = Alternate
- SE = Special exempt
- PR = Protected ranking
- ITF = ITF entry
- JE = Junior exempt
- w/o = Walkover
- r = Retired
- d = Defaulted
- SR = Special ranking

=== Finals ===
Semifinals
(Croatia) Tereza Mrdeža	6	5	5
(Czech Republic) Karolína Muchová	4	7	7
(Italy) Giulia Gatto-Monticone	6	2	2
5	(France) Fiona Ferro	2	6	6

Final
(Czech Republic) Karolína Muchová	4	4
5	(France) Fiona Ferro	6	6

=== Top half ===
First round
1	(Czech Republic) K Siniaková	6	6
(Russia) M Melnikova	1	4
(Czech Republic) M Kilnarová	4	4
(Croatia) T Mrdeža	6	6
(Germany) A Zaja	6	2	6
(Czech Republic) A Zarycká	1	6	4
(Czech Republic) L Hradecká	6	6
LL	(Austria) P König	4	2
3	(Czech Republic) Kr Plíšková	6^{5}	6	5
WC	(Czech Republic) B Štefková	7^{7}	1	7
Q	(Romania) IL Roșca	5	2
(Poland) M Chwalińska	7	6
(Czech Republic) K Muchová	6	6
WC	(Czech Republic) M Pantůčková	0	0
WC	(Russia) Ana Pribylova	6	3	2
8	(Slovakia) M Hončová	2	6	6

Second round
1	(Czech Republic) K Siniaková	5	5
(Croatia) T Mrdeža	7	7
(Germany) A Zaja	6	6
(Czech Republic) L Hradecká	3	3
WC	(Czech Republic) B Štefková	6^{4}	5
(Poland) M Chwalińska	7^{7}	7
(Czech Republic) K Muchová	6	6
8	(Slovakia) M Hončová	4	4

Quarterfinals
(Croatia) T Mrdeža	6	4	7^{7}
(Germany) A Zaja	3	6	6^{4}
(Poland) M Chwalińska	3	0
(Czech Republic) K Muchová	6	6

Semifinals
(Croatia) T Mrdeža	6	5	5
(Czech Republic) K Muchová	4	7	7

=== Bottom half ===
First round
7	(Czech Republic) B Krejčíková	2	2
(Czech Republic) M Kolodziejová	6	6
(Italy) G Gatto-Monticone	6	6
(Croatia) T Lukas	4	3
(United States) K Stewart	6	6
Q	(Russia) M Marfutina	0	2
(Hungary) Á Bukta	4	3
4	(Ukraine) A Kalinina	6	6
5	(France) F Ferro	6	6
Q	(Czech Republic) P Krejsová	0	0
(Serbia) O Danilović	4	6	6
(Czech Republic) J Malečková	6	2	4
WC	(Czech Republic) N Břečková	1	6	2
Q	(Czech Republic) A Dețiuc	6	4	6
LL	(France) V Muntean	2	4
2	(Ukraine) K Kozlova	6	6

Second round
(Czech Republic) M Kolodziejová	2	1
(Italy) G Gatto-Monticone	6	6
(United States) K Stewart	6^{3}	7^{7}	6^{3}
4	(Ukraine) A Kalinina	7^{7}	6^{5}	7^{7}
5	(France) F Ferro	3	6	6
(Serbia) O Danilović	6	4	4
Q	(Czech Republic) A Dețiuc	1	2
2	(Ukraine) K Kozlova	6	6

Quarterfinals
(Italy) G Gatto-Monticone	6	3	6
4	(Ukraine) A Kalinina	2	6	1
5	(France) F Ferro	6	6
2	(Ukraine) K Kozlova	3	1

Semifinals
(Italy) G Gatto-Monticone	6	2	2
5	(France) F Ferro	2	6	6
