= 2018 ITS Cup =

- Date: 16–22 July
- Edition: 10th
- Category: ITF Women's Circuit
- Prize money: $80,000+H
- Surface: Clay
- Location: Olomouc, Czech Republic

Champions

Singles
- (France) Fiona Ferro

Doubles
- (Czech Republic) Petra Krejsová / (Czech Republic) Jesika Malečková
- ITS Cup

The 2018 ITS Cup was a professional tennis tournament played on outdoor clay courts. It was the tenth edition of the tournament and was part of the 2018 ITF Women's Circuit. It took place in Olomouc, Czech Republic, on 16–22 July 2018.

== Singles main draw entrants ==
=== Seeds ===
Country	Player	Rank^{1}	Seed
CZE	Kateřina Siniaková	42	1
UKR	Kateryna Kozlova	67	2
CZE	Kristýna Plíšková	77	3
UKR	Anhelina Kalinina	125	4
FRA	Fiona Ferro	160	5
~~NED~~	~~Richèl Hogenkamp~~	~~161~~	~~6~~
CZE	Barbora Krejčíková	200	7
SVK	Michaela Hončová	220	8

- ^{1} Rankings as of 2 July 2018.

=== Other entrants ===
The following players received a wildcard into the singles main draw:

- (Czech Republic) Nikola Břečková
- (Czech Republic) Magdaléna Pantůčková
- (Russia) Anastasia Pribylova
- (Czech Republic) Barbora Štefková

The following players received entry from the qualifying draw:

- (Czech Republic) Anastasia Dețiuc
- (Czech Republic) Petra Krejsová
- (Russia) Maria Marfutina
- (Romania) Ioana Loredana Roșca

The following player received entry as a lucky losers:

- (Austria) Pia König
- (France) Victoria Muntean

== Champions ==
=== Singles ===
- (France) Fiona Ferro def. (Czech Republic) Karolína Muchová, 6–4, 6–4

=== Doubles ===
- (Czech Republic) Petra Krejsová / (Czech Republic) Jesika Malečková def. (Czech Republic) Lucie Hradecká / (Netherlands) Michaëlla Krajicek, 6–2, 6–1
