= 2015 ITF Women's Circuit (October–December) =

The 2015 ITF Women's Circuit is the 2015 edition of the second-tier tour for women's professional tennis. It is organised by the International Tennis Federation and is a tier below the WTA Tour. The ITF Women's Circuit includes tournaments with prize money ranging from $10,000 up to $100,000.

== Key ==
$100,000 tournaments
$75,000 tournaments
$50,000 tournaments
$25,000 tournaments
$15,000 tournaments
$10,000 tournaments

== Month ==
=== October ===
Week of	Tournament	Winner	Runners-up	Semifinalists	Quarterfinalists
October 5	Abierto Tampico; Tampico, Mexico; Hard $50,000+H; Singles – Doubles	(Spain) Lourdes Domínguez Lino; 7–5, 6–4	(France) Alizé Lim	(United States) Grace Min (Italy) Martina Caregaro	(United States) Kristie Ahn (Italy) Alice Matteucci (Mexico) Victoria Rodríguez (Argentina) Nadia Podoroska
October 5	Abierto Tampico; Tampico, Mexico; Hard $50,000+H; Singles – Doubles	(Argentina) María Irigoyen (Czech Republic) Barbora Krejčíková; 7–5, 6–2	(Paraguay) Verónica Cepede Royg (Russia) Marina Melnikova	(United States) Grace Min (Italy) Martina Caregaro	(United States) Kristie Ahn (Italy) Alice Matteucci (Mexico) Victoria Rodríguez (Argentina) Nadia Podoroska
October 5	Kirkland Tennis Challenger; Kirkland, United States; Hard $50,000; Singles – Doubles	(Luxembourg) Mandy Minella; 2–6, 7–5, 6–2	(United States) Nicole Gibbs	(United States) Sabrina Santamaria (Germany) Antonia Lottner	(United States) Sachia Vickery (United States) Melanie Oudin (United States) Jessica Pegula (United States) Alexa Glatch
October 5	Kirkland Tennis Challenger; Kirkland, United States; Hard $50,000; Singles – Doubles	(France) Stéphanie Foretz (Luxembourg) Mandy Minella; 6–4, 4–6, [10–4]	(Netherlands) Lesley Kerkhove (Netherlands) Arantxa Rus	(United States) Sabrina Santamaria (Germany) Antonia Lottner	(United States) Sachia Vickery (United States) Melanie Oudin (United States) Jessica Pegula (United States) Alexa Glatch
October 5	Cairns, Australia; Hard $25,000; Singles and doubles draws	(Hungary) Dalma Gálfi; 6–4, 6–7^{(9–11)}, 6–1	(Australia) Olivia Tjandramulia	(Australia) Tammi Patterson (Netherlands) Cindy Burger	(Australia) Kimberly Birrell (United Kingdom) Katy Dunne (United States) Jennifer Elie (Russia) Natela Dzalamidze
October 5	Cairns, Australia; Hard $25,000; Singles and doubles draws	(Australia) Jessica Moore (Australia) Storm Sanders; 6–0, 6–3	(United States) Jennifer Elie (United States) Asia Muhammad	(Australia) Tammi Patterson (Netherlands) Cindy Burger	(Australia) Kimberly Birrell (United Kingdom) Katy Dunne (United States) Jennifer Elie (Russia) Natela Dzalamidze
October 5	Sozopol, Bulgaria; Hard $10,000; Singles and doubles draws	(Germany) Vivian Heisen; 6–2, 7–6^{(7–1)}	(Bulgaria) Julia Terziyska	(Bulgaria) Viktoriya Tomova (Romania) Andreea Roșca	(Ukraine) Nadiya Kolb (Bulgaria) Vivian Zlatanova (Czech Republic) Lenka Kunčíková (Czech Republic) Karolína Stuchlá
October 5	Sozopol, Bulgaria; Hard $10,000; Singles and doubles draws	(Germany) Vivian Heisen (Bulgaria) Julia Terziyska; 6–3, 6–1	(Czech Republic) Lenka Kunčíková (Czech Republic) Karolína Stuchlá	(Bulgaria) Viktoriya Tomova (Romania) Andreea Roșca	(Ukraine) Nadiya Kolb (Bulgaria) Vivian Zlatanova (Czech Republic) Lenka Kunčíková (Czech Republic) Karolína Stuchlá
October 5	Sharm el-Sheikh, Egypt; Hard $10,000; Singles and doubles draws	(Sweden) Jacqueline Cabaj Awad; 2–6, 7–6^{(7–5)}, 6–4	(United Kingdom) Freya Christie	(Serbia) Barbara Bonić (Philippines) Katharina Lehnert	(Russia) Anna Morgina (Slovakia) Lenka Juríková (Egypt) Ola Abou Zekry (Russia) Varvara Flink
October 5	Sharm el-Sheikh, Egypt; Hard $10,000; Singles and doubles draws	(United Kingdom) Freya Christie (United States) Alexandra Riley; 7–6^{(11–9)}, 3–6, [10–8]	(Egypt) Ola Abou Zekry (Montenegro) Ana Veselinović	(Serbia) Barbara Bonić (Philippines) Katharina Lehnert	(Russia) Anna Morgina (Slovakia) Lenka Juríková (Egypt) Ola Abou Zekry (Russia) Varvara Flink
October 5	Pula, Italy; Clay $10,000; Singles and doubles draws	(Germany) Anne Schäfer; 6–1, 6–3	(Italy) Camilla Rosatello	(Hungary) Vanda Lukács (Italy) Gioia Barbieri	(Serbia) Dejana Radanović (France) Marie Témin (Italy) Alice Balducci (Czech Republic) Vendula Žovincová
October 5	Pula, Italy; Clay $10,000; Singles and doubles draws	(Hungary) Vanda Lukács (Italy) Camilla Rosatello; 6–3, 6–2	(United States) Dasha Ivanova (Argentina) Melany Krywoj	(Hungary) Vanda Lukács (Italy) Gioia Barbieri	(Serbia) Dejana Radanović (France) Marie Témin (Italy) Alice Balducci (Czech Republic) Vendula Žovincová
October 5	Shymkent, Kazakhstan; Clay $10,000; Singles and doubles draws	(Georgia (country)) Sofia Kvatsabaia; 6–4, 5–7, 6–1	(Germany) Julyette Steur	(Georgia (country)) Ekaterine Gorgodze (Kazakhstan) Kamila Kerimbayeva	(Kazakhstan) Gozal Ainitdinova (Russia) Tamara Bizhukova (Uzbekistan) Arina Folts (Kazakhstan) Zhibek Kulambayeva
October 5	Shymkent, Kazakhstan; Clay $10,000; Singles and doubles draws	(Georgia (country)) Ekaterine Gorgodze (Georgia (country)) Sofia Kvatsabaia; 7–5, 3–6, [10–6]	(Uzbekistan) Albina Khabibulina (Uzbekistan) Polina Merenkova	(Georgia (country)) Ekaterine Gorgodze (Kazakhstan) Kamila Kerimbayeva	(Kazakhstan) Gozal Ainitdinova (Russia) Tamara Bizhukova (Uzbekistan) Arina Folts (Kazakhstan) Zhibek Kulambayeva
October 5	Port El Kantaoui, Tunisia; Hard $10,000; Singles and doubles draws	(Ukraine) Valeriya Strakhova; 6–2, 6–0	(Greece) Valentini Grammatikopoulou	(France) Jessika Ponchet (Slovakia) Michaela Hončová	(United Kingdom) Mirabelle Njoze (Bosnia and Herzegovina) Jelena Simić (Switzerland) Patty Schnyder (France) Carla Touly
October 5	Port El Kantaoui, Tunisia; Hard $10,000; Singles and doubles draws	(Greece) Valentini Grammatikopoulou (Ukraine) Valeriya Strakhova; 5–7, 6–3, [10–5]	(Portugal) Inês Murta (France) Pauline Payet	(France) Jessika Ponchet (Slovakia) Michaela Hončová	(United Kingdom) Mirabelle Njoze (Bosnia and Herzegovina) Jelena Simić (Switzerland) Patty Schnyder (France) Carla Touly
October 5	Antalya, Turkey; Hard $10,000; Singles and doubles draws	(Belarus) Aryna Sabalenka; 6–4, 6–7^{(4–7)}, 7–5	(Romania) Nicoleta Dascălu	(Hungary) Anna Bondár (Hungary) Rebeka Stolmár	(Romania) Andreea Ghițescu (Belgium) Greet Minnen (Zimbabwe) Valeria Bhunu (Bosnia and Herzegovina) Anita Husarić
October 5	Antalya, Turkey; Hard $10,000; Singles and doubles draws	(Romania) Nicoleta Dascălu (Romania) Andreea Ghițescu; 6–4, 3–6, [10–5]	(Hungary) Anna Bondár (Hungary) Rebeka Stolmár	(Hungary) Anna Bondár (Hungary) Rebeka Stolmár	(Romania) Andreea Ghițescu (Belgium) Greet Minnen (Zimbabwe) Valeria Bhunu (Bosnia and Herzegovina) Anita Husarić
October 5	Hilton Head Island, United States; Clay $10,000; Singles and doubles draws	(United States) Alexa Graham; 6–4, 7–6^{(7–5)}	(Norway) Ulrikke Eikeri	(United States) Makenna Jones (Moldova) Alexandra Perper	(United States) Raveena Kingsley (Slovakia) Martina Frantová (United States) Nicole Coopersmith (United States) Caroline Price
October 5	Hilton Head Island, United States; Clay $10,000; Singles and doubles draws	(United States) Madeleine Kobelt (Russia) Nika Kukharchuk; 6–2, 3–6, [10–8]	(United States) Alexa Bortles (United States) Lauren Herring	(United States) Makenna Jones (Moldova) Alexandra Perper	(United States) Raveena Kingsley (Slovakia) Martina Frantová (United States) Nicole Coopersmith (United States) Caroline Price
October 12	Toowoomba, Australia; Hard $25,000; Singles and doubles draws	(Japan) Misa Eguchi; 7–6^{(8–6)}, 7–5	(Sweden) Susanne Celik	(Japan) Eri Hozumi (Netherlands) Cindy Burger	(Australia) Jessica Moore (Australia) Alison Bai (Russia) Natela Dzalamidze (Japan) Erika Sema
October 12	Toowoomba, Australia; Hard $25,000; Singles and doubles draws	(Japan) Misa Eguchi (Japan) Eri Hozumi; 4–6, 7–5, [10–5]	(United States) Veronica Corning (United States) Jessica Wacnik	(Japan) Eri Hozumi (Netherlands) Cindy Burger	(Australia) Jessica Moore (Australia) Alison Bai (Russia) Natela Dzalamidze (Japan) Erika Sema
October 12	Makinohara, Japan; Grass $25,000; Singles and doubles draws	(Poland) Katarzyna Kawa; 6–7^{(6–8)}, 6–2, 7–6^{(8–6)}	(Japan) Riko Sawayanagi	(United States) Tori Kinard (Japan) Shuko Aoyama	(Japan) Kanae Hisami (Japan) Junri Namigata (Japan) Ayaka Okuno (Japan) Yuuki Tanaka
October 12	Makinohara, Japan; Grass $25,000; Singles and doubles draws	(Japan) Kanae Hisami (Japan) Kotomi Takahata; 6–4, 6–1	(Japan) Yukina Saigo (United States) Ena Shibahara	(United States) Tori Kinard (Japan) Shuko Aoyama	(Japan) Kanae Hisami (Japan) Junri Namigata (Japan) Ayaka Okuno (Japan) Yuuki Tanaka
October 12	Rock Hill, United States; Hard $25,000; Singles and doubles draws	(United States) Jennifer Brady; 7–5, 6–4	(Venezuela) Andrea Gámiz	(Switzerland) Romina Oprandi (Norway) Ulrikke Eikeri	(Paraguay) Verónica Cepede Royg (United States) Amy Zhu (France) Sherazad Reix (Brazil) Gabriela Cé
October 12	Rock Hill, United States; Hard $25,000; Singles and doubles draws	(Bosnia and Herzegovina) Ema Burgić Bucko (Mexico) Renata Zarazúa; 7–5, 6–2	(Bulgaria) Elitsa Kostova (Argentina) Florencia Molinero	(Switzerland) Romina Oprandi (Norway) Ulrikke Eikeri	(Paraguay) Verónica Cepede Royg (United States) Amy Zhu (France) Sherazad Reix (Brazil) Gabriela Cé
October 12	São Paulo, Brazil; Clay $10,000; Singles and doubles draws	(Bolivia) María Fernanda Álvarez Terán; 2–6, 7–5, 6–4	(Brazil) Laura Pigossi	(Chile) Fernanda Brito (Argentina) Martina Capurro Taborda	(Brazil) Nathália Rossi (Argentina) Carla Lucero (Brazil) Bárbara Oliveira (Brazil) Nathaly Kurata
October 12	São Paulo, Brazil; Clay $10,000; Singles and doubles draws	(Bolivia) María Fernanda Álvarez Terán (Brazil) Laura Pigossi; 6–3, 4–6, [10–5]	(Argentina) Melina Ferrero (Argentina) Carla Lucero	(Chile) Fernanda Brito (Argentina) Martina Capurro Taborda	(Brazil) Nathália Rossi (Argentina) Carla Lucero (Brazil) Bárbara Oliveira (Brazil) Nathaly Kurata
October 12	Albena, Bulgaria; Clay $10,000; Singles and doubles draws	(Bulgaria) Vivian Zlatanova; 6–1, 7–5	(Romania) Camelia Hristea	(Romania) Cristina Adamescu (Czech Republic) Magdaléna Pantůčková	(Czech Republic) Lenka Kunčíková (Turkey) Hülya Esen (Czech Republic) Karolína Stuchlá (Romania) Oana Georgeta Simion
October 12	Albena, Bulgaria; Clay $10,000; Singles and doubles draws	(Czech Republic) Lenka Kunčíková (Czech Republic) Karolína Stuchlá; 6–1, 6–3	(Czech Republic) Gabriela Pantůčková (Czech Republic) Magdaléna Pantůčková	(Romania) Cristina Adamescu (Czech Republic) Magdaléna Pantůčková	(Czech Republic) Lenka Kunčíková (Turkey) Hülya Esen (Czech Republic) Karolína Stuchlá (Romania) Oana Georgeta Simion
October 12	Sharm el-Sheikh, Egypt; Hard $10,000; Singles and doubles draws	(Philippines) Katharina Lehnert; 6–4, 6–3	(Russia) Veronica Miroshnichenko	(Sweden) Jacqueline Cabaj Awad (Russia) Anna Morgina	(Russia) Varvara Flink (Romania) Ana Bianca Mihăilă (Slovakia) Lenka Juríková (United Kingdom) Freya Christie
October 12	Sharm el-Sheikh, Egypt; Hard $10,000; Singles and doubles draws	(Romania) Karola Bejenaru (United Kingdom) Freya Christie; 6–3, 6–2	(Republic of Ireland) Jenny Claffey (Russia) Anna Morgina	(Sweden) Jacqueline Cabaj Awad (Russia) Anna Morgina	(Russia) Varvara Flink (Romania) Ana Bianca Mihăilă (Slovakia) Lenka Juríková (United Kingdom) Freya Christie
October 12	Heraklion, Greece; Hard $10,000; Singles and doubles draws	(Turkey) Pemra Özgen; 6–0, 6–1	(Sweden) Fanny Östlund	(France) Julie Gervais (Romania) Raluca Șerban	(Germany) Julia Wachaczyk (Samoa) Steffi Carruthers (Germany) Yana Morderger (Slovakia) Viktória Kužmová
October 12	Heraklion, Greece; Hard $10,000; Singles and doubles draws	(Slovakia) Viktória Kužmová (Romania) Raluca Șerban; 6–2, 6–0	(Belgium) Steffi Distelmans (Netherlands) Kelly Versteeg	(France) Julie Gervais (Romania) Raluca Șerban	(Germany) Julia Wachaczyk (Samoa) Steffi Carruthers (Germany) Yana Morderger (Slovakia) Viktória Kužmová
October 12	Tel Aviv, Israel; Hard $10,000; Singles and doubles draws	(Russia) Olga Doroshina; 7–6^{(7–4)}, 6–3	(Israel) Deniz Khazaniuk	(United States) Jaeda Daniel (France) Amandine Cazeaux	(Russia) Sofia Dmitrieva (Israel) Lina Glushko (Uzbekistan) Vlada Ekshibarova (Russia) Marta Paigina
October 12	Tel Aviv, Israel; Hard $10,000; Singles and doubles draws	(Russia) Olga Doroshina (Uzbekistan) Vlada Ekshibarova; 4–6, 6–4, [10–8]	(United Kingdom) Lucy Brown (France) Amandine Cazeaux	(United States) Jaeda Daniel (France) Amandine Cazeaux	(Russia) Sofia Dmitrieva (Israel) Lina Glushko (Uzbekistan) Vlada Ekshibarova (Russia) Marta Paigina
October 12	Pula, Italy; Clay $10,000; Singles and doubles draws	(Hungary) Vanda Lukács; 4–6, 7–5, 6–3	(Hungary) Lilla Barzó	(Italy) Valentine Confalonieri (Serbia) Dejana Radanović	(Italy) Miriana Tona (Switzerland) Nina Stadler (Germany) Julia Kimmelmann (Italy) Federica Arcidiacono
October 12	Pula, Italy; Clay $10,000; Singles and doubles draws	(Italy) Alice Balducci (Italy) Valentine Confalonieri; 6–2, 6–4	(Belgium) Déborah Kerfs (Slovakia) Barbara Kötelesová	(Italy) Valentine Confalonieri (Serbia) Dejana Radanović	(Italy) Miriana Tona (Switzerland) Nina Stadler (Germany) Julia Kimmelmann (Italy) Federica Arcidiacono
October 12	Shymkent, Kazakhstan; Clay $10,000; Singles and doubles draws	(Kazakhstan) Kamila Kerimbayeva; 6–2, 6–2	(Georgia (country)) Ekaterine Gorgodze	(Germany) Julyette Steur (Russia) Polina Novikova	(Russia) Daria Lodikova (Moldova) Adriana Sosnovschi (Uzbekistan) Arina Folts (Georgia (country)) Sofia Kvatsabaia
October 12	Shymkent, Kazakhstan; Clay $10,000; Singles and doubles draws	(Georgia (country)) Ekaterine Gorgodze (Georgia (country)) Sofia Kvatsabaia; 7–5, 6–2	(Kazakhstan) Kamila Kerimbayeva (Russia) Margarita Lazareva	(Germany) Julyette Steur (Russia) Polina Novikova	(Russia) Daria Lodikova (Moldova) Adriana Sosnovschi (Uzbekistan) Arina Folts (Georgia (country)) Sofia Kvatsabaia
October 12	Melilla, Spain; Hard $10,000; Singles and doubles draws	(Spain) Estrella Cabeza Candela; 6–3, 6–4	(Spain) María José Luque Moreno	(United Kingdom) Gabriella Taylor (Spain) Noelia Bouzó Zanotti	(Ecuador) Charlotte Römer (Spain) María Gutiérrez Carrasco (Belarus) Anastasiya Yakimova (Ukraine) Oleksandra Korashvili
October 12	Melilla, Spain; Hard $10,000; Singles and doubles draws	(Spain) Estrella Cabeza Candela (Ukraine) Oleksandra Korashvili; 6–3, 6–1	(Spain) Irene Burillo Escorihuela (United Kingdom) Isabelle Wallace	(United Kingdom) Gabriella Taylor (Spain) Noelia Bouzó Zanotti	(Ecuador) Charlotte Römer (Spain) María Gutiérrez Carrasco (Belarus) Anastasiya Yakimova (Ukraine) Oleksandra Korashvili
October 12	Port El Kantaoui, Tunisia; Hard $10,000; Singles and doubles draws	(Ukraine) Valeriya Strakhova; 6–2, 6–3	(France) Jessika Ponchet	(France) Caroline Roméo (Tunisia) Chiraz Bechri	(United Kingdom) Mirabelle Njoze (Bosnia and Herzegovina) Jelena Simić (Belgium) Sofie Oyen (India) Kyra Shroff
October 12	Port El Kantaoui, Tunisia; Hard $10,000; Singles and doubles draws	(Bosnia and Herzegovina) Jelena Simić (Ukraine) Valeriya Strakhova; 6–3, 6–4	(Belgium) Sofie Oyen (India) Kyra Shroff	(France) Caroline Roméo (Tunisia) Chiraz Bechri	(United Kingdom) Mirabelle Njoze (Bosnia and Herzegovina) Jelena Simić (Belgium) Sofie Oyen (India) Kyra Shroff
October 12	Antalya, Turkey; Hard $10,000; Singles and doubles draws	(Belgium) Greet Minnen; 6–3, 3–0, ret.	(Romania) Daiana Negreanu	(Spain) Cristina Sánchez Quintanar (Turkey) Melis Sezer	(Germany) Luisa Marie Huber (Romania) Nicoleta Dascălu (Hungary) Rebeka Stolmár (Hungary) Anna Bondár
October 12	Antalya, Turkey; Hard $10,000; Singles and doubles draws	(Hungary) Anna Bondár (Hungary) Rebeka Stolmár; 6–1, 2–6, [10–5]	(Romania) Daiana Negreanu (Spain) Cristina Sánchez Quintanar	(Spain) Cristina Sánchez Quintanar (Turkey) Melis Sezer	(Germany) Luisa Marie Huber (Romania) Nicoleta Dascălu (Hungary) Rebeka Stolmár (Hungary) Anna Bondár
October 19	Challenger Banque Nationale de Saguenay; Saguenay, Canada; Hard (indoor) $50,000; Singles – Doubles	(Serbia) Jovana Jakšić; 6–3, 6–7^{(5–7)}, 6–1	(Switzerland) Amra Sadiković	(United States) Maria Sanchez (United States) Nadja Gilchrist	(Canada) Carol Zhao (Canada) Charlotte Robillard-Millette (United States) Ashley Weinhold (United States) Samantha Crawford
October 19	Challenger Banque Nationale de Saguenay; Saguenay, Canada; Hard (indoor) $50,000; Singles – Doubles	(Romania) Mihaela Buzărnescu (Poland) Justyna Jegiołka; 7–6^{(8–6)}, 4–6, [10–7]	(Canada) Sharon Fichman (United States) Maria Sanchez	(United States) Maria Sanchez (United States) Nadja Gilchrist	(Canada) Carol Zhao (Canada) Charlotte Robillard-Millette (United States) Ashley Weinhold (United States) Samantha Crawford
October 19	Suzhou Ladies Open; Suzhou, China; Hard $50,000; Singles – Doubles	(China) Zhang Kailin; 1–6, 6–3, 6–4	(China) Duan Yingying	(Slovakia) Kristína Kučová (China) Wang Yafan	(Kazakhstan) Yulia Putintseva (Japan) Hiroko Kuwata (Russia) Ekaterina Bychkova (China) Zhang Yuxuan
October 19	Suzhou Ladies Open; Suzhou, China; Hard $50,000; Singles – Doubles	(China) Yang Zhaoxuan (China) Zhang Yuxuan; 7–6^{(7–4)}, 6–2	(China) Tian Ran (China) Zhang Kailin	(Slovakia) Kristína Kučová (China) Wang Yafan	(Kazakhstan) Yulia Putintseva (Japan) Hiroko Kuwata (Russia) Ekaterina Bychkova (China) Zhang Yuxuan
October 19	Open Engie de Touraine; Joué-lès-Tours, France; Hard (indoor) $50,000; Singles – Doubles	(Ukraine) Olga Fridman; 6–2, 3–6, 6–1	(Czech Republic) Kristýna Plíšková	(France) Pauline Parmentier (France) Stéphanie Foretz	(Georgia (country)) Sofia Shapatava (France) Irina Ramialison (Turkey) Başak Eraydın (United States) Bernarda Pera
October 19	Open Engie de Touraine; Joué-lès-Tours, France; Hard (indoor) $50,000; Singles – Doubles	(Romania) Alexandra Cadanțu (Romania) Cristina Dinu; 7–5, 6–3	(Switzerland) Viktorija Golubic (Italy) Alice Matteucci	(France) Pauline Parmentier (France) Stéphanie Foretz	(Georgia (country)) Sofia Shapatava (France) Irina Ramialison (Turkey) Başak Eraydın (United States) Bernarda Pera
October 19	Brisbane, Australia; Hard $25,000; Singles and doubles draws	(Australia) Priscilla Hon; 6–4, 6–3	(Australia) Kimberly Birrell	(United States) Asia Muhammad (Australia) Alison Bai	(Japan) Eri Hozumi (United States) Yuki Chiang (Thailand) Noppawan Lertcheewakarn (Papua New Guinea) Abigail Tere-Apisah
October 19	Brisbane, Australia; Hard $25,000; Singles and doubles draws	(United States) Lauren Embree (United States) Asia Muhammad; 6–2, 4–6, [11–9]	(Thailand) Noppawan Lertcheewakarn (Thailand) Varatchaya Wongteanchai	(United States) Asia Muhammad (Australia) Alison Bai	(Japan) Eri Hozumi (United States) Yuki Chiang (Thailand) Noppawan Lertcheewakarn (Papua New Guinea) Abigail Tere-Apisah
October 19	Bucaramanga, Colombia; Clay $25,000+H; Singles and doubles draws	(Chile) Daniela Seguel; 6–7^{(0–7)}, 6–3, 6–4	(Paraguay) Montserrat González	(Austria) Barbara Haas (Bolivia) María Fernanda Álvarez Terán	(Mexico) Ana Sofía Sánchez (Bulgaria) Aleksandrina Naydenova (United States) Usue Maitane Arconada (United States) Lauren Albanese
October 19	Bucaramanga, Colombia; Clay $25,000+H; Singles and doubles draws	(Bulgaria) Aleksandrina Naydenova (Chile) Daniela Seguel; 6–2, 7–6^{(7–3)}	(Paraguay) Montserrat González (Dominican Republic) Francesca Segarelli	(Austria) Barbara Haas (Bolivia) María Fernanda Álvarez Terán	(Mexico) Ana Sofía Sánchez (Bulgaria) Aleksandrina Naydenova (United States) Usue Maitane Arconada (United States) Lauren Albanese
October 19	Hamamatsu, Japan; Grass $25,000; Singles and doubles draws	(Japan) Shuko Aoyama; 6–2, 6–1	(Japan) Miyu Kato	(Japan) Ayaka Okuno (Poland) Katarzyna Kawa	(Japan) Riko Sawayanagi (Japan) Mana Ayukawa (United States) Tori Kinard (Japan) Yuka Higuchi
October 19	Hamamatsu, Japan; Grass $25,000; Singles and doubles draws	(Japan) Mana Ayukawa (Japan) Makoto Ninomiya; 0–6, 6–3, [10–4]	(Japan) Kanae Hisami (Japan) Kotomi Takahata	(Japan) Ayaka Okuno (Poland) Katarzyna Kawa	(Japan) Riko Sawayanagi (Japan) Mana Ayukawa (United States) Tori Kinard (Japan) Yuka Higuchi
October 19	Florence, United States; Hard $25,000; Singles and doubles draws	(United States) Grace Min; 6–2, 4–6, 7–6^{(7–2)}	(Brazil) Paula Cristina Gonçalves	(Argentina) Florencia Molinero (United States) Robin Anderson	(Ukraine) Sofiya Kovalets (United States) Kaitlyn McCarthy (France) Elixane Lechemia (United States) Sofia Kenin
October 19	Florence, United States; Hard $25,000; Singles and doubles draws	(Bosnia and Herzegovina) Ema Burgić Bucko (United States) Keri Wong; 7–6^{(8–6)}, 6–1	(Latvia) Diāna Marcinkēviča (United States) Chiara Scholl	(Argentina) Florencia Molinero (United States) Robin Anderson	(Ukraine) Sofiya Kovalets (United States) Kaitlyn McCarthy (France) Elixane Lechemia (United States) Sofia Kenin
October 19	Bangkok, Thailand; Hard $15,000; Singles and doubles draws	(China) Lu Jiajing; 7–6^{(7–3)}, 5–7, 6–3	(Thailand) Kamonwan Buayam	(Thailand) Nudnida Luangnam (Thailand) Nungnadda Wannasuk	(Thailand) Peangtarn Plipuech (Sweden) Kajsa Rinaldo Persson (Thailand) Tamachan Momkoonthod (Czech Republic) Karolína Muchová
October 19	Bangkok, Thailand; Hard $15,000; Singles and doubles draws	(Thailand) Nudnida Luangnam (Thailand) Peangtarn Plipuech; 6–2, 6–3	(Finland) Emma Laine (Ukraine) Valeriya Strakhova	(Thailand) Nudnida Luangnam (Thailand) Nungnadda Wannasuk	(Thailand) Peangtarn Plipuech (Sweden) Kajsa Rinaldo Persson (Thailand) Tamachan Momkoonthod (Czech Republic) Karolína Muchová
October 19	Santa Cruz, Bolivia; Clay $10,000; Singles and doubles draws	(Chile) Fernanda Brito; 6–2, 6–4	(Argentina) Melina Ferrero	(Argentina) Martina Capurro Taborda (Argentina) Sofía Luini	(Argentina) Francesca Rescaldani (Argentina) Carla Lucero (Brazil) Nathália Rossi (Argentina) Ornella Garavani
October 19	Santa Cruz, Bolivia; Clay $10,000; Singles and doubles draws	(Argentina) Melina Ferrero (Argentina) Carla Lucero; 6–2, 6–3	(Argentina) Francesca Rescaldani (Brazil) Nathália Rossi	(Argentina) Martina Capurro Taborda (Argentina) Sofía Luini	(Argentina) Francesca Rescaldani (Argentina) Carla Lucero (Brazil) Nathália Rossi (Argentina) Ornella Garavani
October 19	Sharm el-Sheikh, Egypt; Hard $10,000; Singles and doubles draws	(Republic of Ireland) Jenny Claffey; 6–3, 7–6^{(7–4)}	(Romania) Karola Bejenaru	(United Kingdom) Freya Christie (Russia) Anna Morgina	(Chinese Taipei) Hsu Chieh-yu (Romania) Ana Bianca Mihăilă (United Kingdom) Lisa Whybourn (Russia) Anastasia Pribylova
October 19	Sharm el-Sheikh, Egypt; Hard $10,000; Singles and doubles draws	(United Kingdom) Emily Arbuthnott (United Kingdom) Lisa Whybourn; 6–2, 6–4	(Chinese Taipei) Hsu Chieh-yu (Russia) Anna Morgina	(United Kingdom) Freya Christie (Russia) Anna Morgina	(Chinese Taipei) Hsu Chieh-yu (Romania) Ana Bianca Mihăilă (United Kingdom) Lisa Whybourn (Russia) Anastasia Pribylova
October 19	Heraklion, Greece; Hard $10,000; Singles and doubles draws	(Greece) Valentini Grammatikopoulou; 3–6, 6–3, 6–3	(Turkey) Pemra Özgen	(Serbia) Milana Spremo (France) Julie Gervais	(Germany) Julia Wachaczyk (Bulgaria) Julia Stamatova (Netherlands) Kelly Versteeg (Netherlands) Janneke Wikkerink
October 19	Heraklion, Greece; Hard $10,000; Singles and doubles draws	(Ukraine) Veronika Kapshay (Germany) Julia Wachaczyk; 6–2, 6–4	(France) Estelle Cascino (Spain) María Martínez Martínez	(Serbia) Milana Spremo (France) Julie Gervais	(Germany) Julia Wachaczyk (Bulgaria) Julia Stamatova (Netherlands) Kelly Versteeg (Netherlands) Janneke Wikkerink
October 19	Lucknow, India; Grass $10,000; Singles and doubles draws	(India) Prerna Bhambri; 6–4, 6–1	(India) Rishika Sunkara	(India) Dhruthi Tatachar Venugopal (India) Prarthana Thombare	(India) Sharmada Balu (Chinese Taipei) Shih Hsin-yuan (India) Riya Bhatia (India) Snehadevi Reddy
October 19	Lucknow, India; Grass $10,000; Singles and doubles draws	(India) Prerna Bhambri (India) Prarthana Thombare; 6–3, 4–6, [10–7]	(India) Sharmada Balu (India) Nidhi Chilumula	(India) Dhruthi Tatachar Venugopal (India) Prarthana Thombare	(India) Sharmada Balu (Chinese Taipei) Shih Hsin-yuan (India) Riya Bhatia (India) Snehadevi Reddy
October 19	Ramat HaSharon, Israel; Hard $10,000; Singles and doubles draws	(Russia) Marta Paigina; 6–4, 6–4	(Israel) Deniz Khazaniuk	(France) Amandine Cazeaux (Italy) Corinna Dentoni	(Israel) Shelly Krolitzky (Israel) Maya Tahan (Russia) Olga Doroshina (Belgium) Hélène Scholsen
October 19	Ramat HaSharon, Israel; Hard $10,000; Singles and doubles draws	(Italy) Corinna Dentoni (Israel) Deniz Khazaniuk; 6–2, 6–0	(Israel) Sean Lodzki (Israel) Ester Masuri	(France) Amandine Cazeaux (Italy) Corinna Dentoni	(Israel) Shelly Krolitzky (Israel) Maya Tahan (Russia) Olga Doroshina (Belgium) Hélène Scholsen
October 19	Pula, Italy; Clay $10,000; Singles and doubles draws	(Italy) Jessica Pieri; 6–4, 1–6, 7–5	(Switzerland) Nina Stadler	(Italy) Gioia Barbieri (Italy) Camilla Scala	(Spain) Ariadna Martí Riembau (France) Marie Témin (Italy) Maria Masini (Italy) Cristiana Ferrando
October 19	Pula, Italy; Clay $10,000; Singles and doubles draws	(France) Joséphine Boualem (Spain) Ariadna Martí Riembau; 7–5, 7–6^{(7–5)}	(Italy) Diletta Alessandrelli (Italy) Federica Bilardo	(Italy) Gioia Barbieri (Italy) Camilla Scala	(Spain) Ariadna Martí Riembau (France) Marie Témin (Italy) Maria Masini (Italy) Cristiana Ferrando
October 19	Port El Kantaoui, Tunisia; Hard $10,000; Singles and doubles draws	(Belgium) Magali Kempen; 5–7, 6–3, 6–2	(Liechtenstein) Kathinka von Deichmann	(Belarus) Anastasiya Shleptsova (Belgium) Sofie Oyen	(Tunisia) Chiraz Bechri (United Kingdom) Mirabelle Njoze (Bosnia and Herzegovina) Jelena Simić (Russia) Aminat Kushkhova
October 19	Port El Kantaoui, Tunisia; Hard $10,000; Singles and doubles draws	(Belgium) Magali Kempen (Russia) Yana Sizikova; 7–6^{(7–0)}, 6–4	(Poland) Patrycja Polańska (Czech Republic) Anna Slováková	(Belarus) Anastasiya Shleptsova (Belgium) Sofie Oyen	(Tunisia) Chiraz Bechri (United Kingdom) Mirabelle Njoze (Bosnia and Herzegovina) Jelena Simić (Russia) Aminat Kushkhova
October 19	Antalya, Turkey; Hard $10,000; Singles and doubles draws	(Hungary) Anna Bondár; 3–6, 6–2, 6–1	(Belgium) Greet Minnen	(Romania) Elena Ruse (Italy) Bianca Turati	(Chinese Taipei) Lee Pei-chi (Russia) Vasilisa Aponasenko (Ukraine) Alona Fomina (Romania) Daiana Negreanu
October 19	Antalya, Turkey; Hard $10,000; Singles and doubles draws	(Germany) Anna Klasen (Germany) Charlotte Klasen; 6–4, 6–4	(Hungary) Anna Bondár (Hungary) Rebeka Stolmár	(Romania) Elena Ruse (Italy) Bianca Turati	(Chinese Taipei) Lee Pei-chi (Russia) Vasilisa Aponasenko (Ukraine) Alona Fomina (Romania) Daiana Negreanu
October 26	Nanjing Ladies Open; Nanjing, China; Hard $100,000; Singles – Doubles	(Chinese Taipei) Hsieh Su-wei; 7–6^{(7–5)}, 2–6, 6–2	(Kazakhstan) Yulia Putintseva	(China) Zhang Kailin (China) Xu Shilin	(China) Tian Ran (China) Lu Jingjing (Slovakia) Kristína Kučová (China) Han Xinyun
October 26	Nanjing Ladies Open; Nanjing, China; Hard $100,000; Singles – Doubles	(Japan) Shuko Aoyama (Japan) Eri Hozumi; 7–5, 6–7^{(7–9)}, [10–7]	(Chinese Taipei) Chan Chin-wei (China) Zhang Kailin	(China) Zhang Kailin (China) Xu Shilin	(China) Tian Ran (China) Lu Jingjing (Slovakia) Kristína Kučová (China) Han Xinyun
October 26	Internationaux Féminins de la Vienne; Poitiers, France; Hard (indoor) $100,000; Singles – Doubles	(Romania) Monica Niculescu; 7–5, 6–2	(France) Pauline Parmentier	(Ukraine) Kateryna Kozlova (Austria) Tamira Paszek	(Netherlands) Kiki Bertens (Germany) Carina Witthöft (Switzerland) Stefanie Vögele (Croatia) Donna Vekić
October 26	Internationaux Féminins de la Vienne; Poitiers, France; Hard (indoor) $100,000; Singles – Doubles	(Romania) Andreea Mitu (Romania) Monica Niculescu; 6–7^{(5–7)}, 7–6^{(7–2)}, [10–8]	(France) Stéphanie Foretz (France) Amandine Hesse	(Ukraine) Kateryna Kozlova (Austria) Tamira Paszek	(Netherlands) Kiki Bertens (Germany) Carina Witthöft (Switzerland) Stefanie Vögele (Croatia) Donna Vekić
October 26	Tevlin Women's Challenger; Toronto, Canada; Hard (indoor) $50,000; Singles – Doubles	(Germany) Tatjana Maria; 6–3, 6–2	(Serbia) Jovana Jakšić	(Canada) Carol Zhao (Switzerland) Amra Sadiković	(United States) Maria Sanchez (Canada) Heidi El Tabakh (United States) Kristie Ahn (Netherlands) Michaëlla Krajicek
October 26	Tevlin Women's Challenger; Toronto, Canada; Hard (indoor) $50,000; Singles – Doubles	(Canada) Sharon Fichman (United States) Maria Sanchez; 6–2, 6–7^{(6–8)}, [10–6]	(United States) Kristie Ahn (Hungary) Fanny Stollár	(Canada) Carol Zhao (Switzerland) Amra Sadiković	(United States) Maria Sanchez (Canada) Heidi El Tabakh (United States) Kristie Ahn (Netherlands) Michaëlla Krajicek
October 26	USTA Tennis Classic of Macon; Macon, United States; Hard $50,000; Singles – Doubles	(Sweden) Rebecca Peterson; 6–3, 4–6, 6–1	(United States) Anna Tatishvili	(United States) Julia Boserup (Netherlands) Lesley Kerkhove	(Israel) Julia Glushko (United States) Nicole Gibbs (United States) Jennifer Brady (Turkey) Çağla Büyükakçay
October 26	USTA Tennis Classic of Macon; Macon, United States; Hard $50,000; Singles – Doubles	(United States) Jan Abaza (Switzerland) Viktorija Golubic; 7–6^{(7–3)}, 7–5	(Brazil) Paula Cristina Gonçalves (United States) Sanaz Marand	(United States) Julia Boserup (Netherlands) Lesley Kerkhove	(Israel) Julia Glushko (United States) Nicole Gibbs (United States) Jennifer Brady (Turkey) Çağla Büyükakçay
October 26	Istanbul, Turkey; Hard (indoor) $25,000; Singles and doubles draws	(Serbia) Ivana Jorović; 6–3, 7–5	(Croatia) Jana Fett	(Turkey) Pemra Özgen (Turkey) Başak Eraydın	(Romania) Cristina Dinu (Russia) Polina Leykina (Russia) Irina Khromacheva (Ukraine) Yuliya Beygelzimer
October 26	Istanbul, Turkey; Hard (indoor) $25,000; Singles and doubles draws	(Turkey) Başak Eraydın (Russia) Polina Leykina; 7–5, 6–7^{(2–7)}, [10–5]	(Romania) Cristina Dinu (Croatia) Jana Fett	(Turkey) Pemra Özgen (Turkey) Başak Eraydın	(Romania) Cristina Dinu (Russia) Polina Leykina (Russia) Irina Khromacheva (Ukraine) Yuliya Beygelzimer
October 26	Bangkok, Thailand; Hard $15,000; Singles and doubles draws	(Japan) Hiroko Kuwata; 7–5, 6–4	(Ukraine) Valeriya Strakhova	(Thailand) Peangtarn Plipuech (China) Lu Jiajing	(Thailand) Kamonwan Buayam (United Kingdom) Katie Swan (Hungary) Naomi Totka (South Korea) Kim Dabin
October 26	Bangkok, Thailand; Hard $15,000; Singles and doubles draws	(Japan) Ayaka Okuno (Ukraine) Valeriya Strakhova; 6–2, 7–6^{(7–2)}	(Thailand) Chompoothip Jandakate (Thailand) Peangtarn Plipuech	(Thailand) Peangtarn Plipuech (China) Lu Jiajing	(Thailand) Kamonwan Buayam (United Kingdom) Katie Swan (Hungary) Naomi Totka (South Korea) Kim Dabin
October 26	Sharm el-Sheikh, Egypt; Hard $10,000; Singles and doubles draws	(United Kingdom) Emily Arbuthnott; 3–6, 6–1, 7–6^{(7–3)}	(United Kingdom) Lisa Whybourn	(Romania) Elena-Teodora Cadar (United Kingdom) Jazzamay Drew	(Slovakia) Tereza Mihalíková (Russia) Anna Morgina (Russia) Valeriya Pogrebnyak (Kazakhstan) Kamila Kerimbayeva
October 26	Sharm el-Sheikh, Egypt; Hard $10,000; Singles and doubles draws	(United Kingdom) Emily Arbuthnott (United Kingdom) Lisa Whybourn; 6–3, 6–0	(Belgium) Vicky Geurinckx (Slovakia) Tereza Mihalíková	(Romania) Elena-Teodora Cadar (United Kingdom) Jazzamay Drew	(Slovakia) Tereza Mihalíková (Russia) Anna Morgina (Russia) Valeriya Pogrebnyak (Kazakhstan) Kamila Kerimbayeva
October 26	Ismaning, Germany; Carpet (indoor) $10,000; Singles and doubles draws	(Romania) Laura-Ioana Andrei; 6–2, 6–2	(Croatia) Adrijana Lekaj	(Germany) Sarah-Rebecca Sekulic (Germany) Anna Zaja	(Czech Republic) Markéta Vondroušová (Czech Republic) Petra Rohanová (Germany) Jil Nora Engelmann (Germany) Ribana Roth
October 26	Ismaning, Germany; Carpet (indoor) $10,000; Singles and doubles draws	(Germany) Lena Rüffer (Germany) Anna Zaja; 5–7, 7–6^{(7–3)}, [10–3]	(Belgium) Michaela Boev (Germany) Hristina Dishkova	(Germany) Sarah-Rebecca Sekulic (Germany) Anna Zaja	(Czech Republic) Markéta Vondroušová (Czech Republic) Petra Rohanová (Germany) Jil Nora Engelmann (Germany) Ribana Roth
October 26	Heraklion, Greece; Hard $10,000; Singles and doubles draws	(Greece) Valentini Grammatikopoulou; 7–5, 6–1	(Bulgaria) Julia Stamatova	(Germany) Julia Wachaczyk (Russia) Amina Anshba	(Moldova) Daniela Ciobanu (Greece) Eleni Christofi (Uzbekistan) Vlada Ekshibarova (France) Sara Cakarevic
October 26	Heraklion, Greece; Hard $10,000; Singles and doubles draws	(Greece) Eleni Christofi (Netherlands) Phillis Vanenburg; 6–3, 6–3	(Greece) Valentini Grammatikopoulou (Netherlands) Janneke Wikkerink	(Germany) Julia Wachaczyk (Russia) Amina Anshba	(Moldova) Daniela Ciobanu (Greece) Eleni Christofi (Uzbekistan) Vlada Ekshibarova (France) Sara Cakarevic
October 26	Raipur, India; Hard $10,000; Singles and doubles draws	(India) Rishika Sunkara; 7–5, 3–6, 6–2	(India) Natasha Palha	(India) Eetee Maheta (India) Prarthana Thombare	(India) Sri Peddi Reddy (Chinese Taipei) Shih Hsin-yuan (India) Sharmada Balu (India) Prerna Bhambri
October 26	Raipur, India; Hard $10,000; Singles and doubles draws	(India) Sharmada Balu (India) Prarthana Thombare; 6–3, 6–7^{(4–7)}, [10–8]	(India) Prerna Bhambri (India) Rishika Sunkara	(India) Eetee Maheta (India) Prarthana Thombare	(India) Sri Peddi Reddy (Chinese Taipei) Shih Hsin-yuan (India) Sharmada Balu (India) Prerna Bhambri
October 26	Pula, Italy; Clay $10,000; Singles and doubles draws	(Italy) Corinna Dentoni; 6–2, 6–1	(Germany) Julia Kimmelmann	(Italy) Beatrice Torelli (Italy) Georgia Brescia	(Italy) Gioia Barbieri (France) Joséphine Boualem (Czech Republic) Veronika Vlkovská (Italy) Camilla Scala
October 26	Pula, Italy; Clay $10,000; Singles and doubles draws	(Italy) Federica Bilardo (Russia) Olesya Pervushina; 6–3, 6–4	(Slovakia) Nikola Doláková (Slovakia) Barbara Kötelesová	(Italy) Beatrice Torelli (Italy) Georgia Brescia	(Italy) Gioia Barbieri (France) Joséphine Boualem (Czech Republic) Veronika Vlkovská (Italy) Camilla Scala
October 26	Stockholm, Sweden; Hard (indoor) $10,000; Singles and doubles draws	(Denmark) Emilie Francati; 6–4, 3–6, 7–6^{(7–4)}	(Norway) Melanie Stokke	(Netherlands) Kelly Versteeg (France) Priscilla Heise	(Poland) Olga Brózda (Sweden) Cornelia Lister (Estonia) Valeria Gorlats (Switzerland) Tess Sugnaux
October 26	Stockholm, Sweden; Hard (indoor) $10,000; Singles and doubles draws	(Sweden) Cornelia Lister (Sweden) Hilda Melander; 6–4, 6–3	(Russia) Ksenia Gaydarzhi (Sweden) Anette Munozova	(Netherlands) Kelly Versteeg (France) Priscilla Heise	(Poland) Olga Brózda (Sweden) Cornelia Lister (Estonia) Valeria Gorlats (Switzerland) Tess Sugnaux
October 26	Port El Kantaoui, Tunisia; Hard $10,000; Singles and doubles draws	(Liechtenstein) Kathinka von Deichmann; 7–5, 5–7, 6–2	(Russia) Yana Sizikova	(India) Kyra Shroff (Czech Republic) Anna Slováková	(France) Kassandra Davesne (Belgium) Magali Kempen (Slovakia) Sandra Jamrichová (United Kingdom) Mirabelle Njoze
October 26	Port El Kantaoui, Tunisia; Hard $10,000; Singles and doubles draws	(Romania) Daiana Negreanu (India) Kyra Shroff; 6–2, 6–4	(Sweden) Mathilda Malm (United Kingdom) Mirabelle Njoze	(India) Kyra Shroff (Czech Republic) Anna Slováková	(France) Kassandra Davesne (Belgium) Magali Kempen (Slovakia) Sandra Jamrichová (United Kingdom) Mirabelle Njoze

=== November ===
Week of	Tournament	Winner	Runners-up	Semifinalists	Quarterfinalists
November 2	Canberra Tennis International; Canberra, Australia; Hard $50,000; Singles – Doubles	(United States) Asia Muhammad; 6–4, 6–3	(Japan) Eri Hozumi	(Australia) Kimberly Birrell (Japan) Misa Eguchi	(United States) Jessica Wacnik (United States) Jennifer Elie (United States) Lauren Embree (Australia) Arina Rodionova
November 2	Canberra Tennis International; Canberra, Australia; Hard $50,000; Singles – Doubles	(Japan) Misa Eguchi (Japan) Eri Hozumi; 7–6^{(15–13)}, 1–6, [14–12]	(United States) Lauren Embree (United States) Asia Muhammad	(Australia) Kimberly Birrell (Japan) Misa Eguchi	(United States) Jessica Wacnik (United States) Jennifer Elie (United States) Lauren Embree (Australia) Arina Rodionova
November 2	Engie Open Nantes Atlantique; Nantes, France; Hard (indoor) $50,000; Singles – Doubles	(France) Mathilde Johansson; 6–3, 6–4	(Romania) Andreea Mitu	(United States) Louisa Chirico (Czech Republic) Kateřina Siniaková	(Germany) Anna-Lena Friedsam (Austria) Tamira Paszek (Ukraine) Anhelina Kalinina (Switzerland) Xenia Knoll
November 2	Engie Open Nantes Atlantique; Nantes, France; Hard (indoor) $50,000; Singles – Doubles	(Czech Republic) Lenka Kunčíková (Czech Republic) Karolína Stuchlá; 6–4, 6–2	(Czech Republic) Kateřina Siniaková (Czech Republic) Renata Voráčová	(United States) Louisa Chirico (Czech Republic) Kateřina Siniaková	(Germany) Anna-Lena Friedsam (Austria) Tamira Paszek (Ukraine) Anhelina Kalinina (Switzerland) Xenia Knoll
November 2	Waco Showdown; Waco, United States; Hard $50,000; Singles – Doubles	(Switzerland) Viktorija Golubic; 6–2, 6–1	(United States) Nicole Gibbs	(Paraguay) Verónica Cepede Royg (Israel) Julia Glushko	(United States) Anna Tatishvili (Sweden) Rebecca Peterson (United States) Kristie Ahn (United Kingdom) Naomi Broady
November 2	Waco Showdown; Waco, United States; Hard $50,000; Singles – Doubles	(United States) Nicole Gibbs (United States) Vania King; 6–4, 6–4	(Israel) Julia Glushko (Sweden) Rebecca Peterson	(Paraguay) Verónica Cepede Royg (Israel) Julia Glushko	(United States) Anna Tatishvili (Sweden) Rebecca Peterson (United States) Kristie Ahn (United Kingdom) Naomi Broady
November 2	Casablanca, Morocco; Clay $25,000; Singles and doubles draws	(Austria) Melanie Klaffner; 2–6, 7–6^{(9–7)}, 2–1, ret.	(Russia) Irina Khromacheva	(Bosnia and Herzegovina) Dea Herdželaš (Spain) Laura Pous Tió	(Greece) Maria Sakkari (France) Sherazad Reix (Italy) Giulia Gatto-Monticone (Slovenia) Tamara Zidanšek
November 2	Casablanca, Morocco; Clay $25,000; Singles and doubles draws	(Spain) Olga Parres Azcoitia (Italy) Camilla Rosatello; 6–2, 6–4	(France) Alice Bacquié (Portugal) Inês Murta	(Bosnia and Herzegovina) Dea Herdželaš (Spain) Laura Pous Tió	(Greece) Maria Sakkari (France) Sherazad Reix (Italy) Giulia Gatto-Monticone (Slovenia) Tamara Zidanšek
November 2	Aegon Pro-Series Loughborough; Loughborough, United Kingdom; Hard (indoor) $15,000; Singles and doubles draws	(Croatia) Jana Fett; 6–2, 6–1	(Italy) Cristiana Ferrando	(United Kingdom) Tara Moore (Switzerland) Conny Perrin	(Italy) Gioia Barbieri (Finland) Mia Nicole Eklund (Czech Republic) Kateřina Vaňková (United Kingdom) Freya Christie
November 2	Aegon Pro-Series Loughborough; Loughborough, United Kingdom; Hard (indoor) $15,000; Singles and doubles draws	(United Kingdom) Freya Christie (United Kingdom) Lisa Whybourn; 6–1, 6–2	(Samoa) Steffi Carruthers (Mexico) Sabastiani León	(United Kingdom) Tara Moore (Switzerland) Conny Perrin	(Italy) Gioia Barbieri (Finland) Mia Nicole Eklund (Czech Republic) Kateřina Vaňková (United Kingdom) Freya Christie
November 2	Sharm el-Sheikh, Egypt; Hard $10,000; Singles and doubles draws	(Russia) Anastasia Pribylova; 6–2, 7–6^{(7–5)}	(Kazakhstan) Kamila Kerimbayeva	(Chinese Taipei) Hsu Chieh-yu (Russia) Anna Pribylova	(Montenegro) Ana Veselinović (India) Natasha Palha (Czech Republic) Martina Přádová (Germany) Vivian Wolff
November 2	Sharm el-Sheikh, Egypt; Hard $10,000; Singles and doubles draws	(Chinese Taipei) Hsu Chieh-yu (Czech Republic) Martina Přádová; 6–2, 6–4	(Belgium) Vicky Geurinckx (Russia) Melissa Ifidzhen	(Chinese Taipei) Hsu Chieh-yu (Russia) Anna Pribylova	(Montenegro) Ana Veselinović (India) Natasha Palha (Czech Republic) Martina Přádová (Germany) Vivian Wolff
November 2	Heraklion, Greece; Hard $10,000; Singles and doubles draws	(Bulgaria) Viktoriya Tomova; 6–3, 6–2	(France) Margot Yerolymos	(Uzbekistan) Vlada Ekshibarova (France) Sara Cakarevic	(France) Caroline Roméo (United Kingdom) Maia Lumsden (Romania) Andreea Ghițescu (Hungary) Csilla Argyelán
November 2	Heraklion, Greece; Hard $10,000; Singles and doubles draws	(Greece) Eleni Christofi (Uzbekistan) Vlada Ekshibarova; 4–6, 6–3, [10–1]	(Switzerland) Karin Kennel (Bulgaria) Viktoriya Tomova	(Uzbekistan) Vlada Ekshibarova (France) Sara Cakarevic	(France) Caroline Roméo (United Kingdom) Maia Lumsden (Romania) Andreea Ghițescu (Hungary) Csilla Argyelán
November 2	Pula, Italy; Clay $10,000; Singles and doubles draws	(Russia) Olesya Pervushina; 2–6, 7–5, 6–1	(Italy) Anastasia Grymalska	(Italy) Corinna Dentoni (Italy) Beatrice Torelli	(Italy) Federica Bilardo (Switzerland) Kim Fontana (Italy) Martina Di Giuseppe (Italy) Miriana Tona
November 2	Pula, Italy; Clay $10,000; Singles and doubles draws	(Italy) Martina Di Giuseppe (Italy) Anastasia Grymalska; 6–2, 6–4	(Italy) Federica Bilardo (Russia) Olesya Pervushina	(Italy) Corinna Dentoni (Italy) Beatrice Torelli	(Italy) Federica Bilardo (Switzerland) Kim Fontana (Italy) Martina Di Giuseppe (Italy) Miriana Tona
November 2	Oslo, Norway; Hard (indoor) $10,000; Singles and doubles draws	(Norway) Emma Flood; 6–2, 6–4	(Norway) Melanie Stokke	(Russia) Valeriya Urzhumova (Norway) Ulrikke Eikeri	(Norway) Andrea Raaholt (Denmark) Emilie Francati (Norway) Malene Helgø (Slovakia) Šarlota Česneková
November 2	Oslo, Norway; Hard (indoor) $10,000; Singles and doubles draws	(Germany) Kim Grajdek (Russia) Ekaterina Yashina; 6–2, 6–3	(Norway) Astrid Brune Olsen (Norway) Malene Helgø	(Russia) Valeriya Urzhumova (Norway) Ulrikke Eikeri	(Norway) Andrea Raaholt (Denmark) Emilie Francati (Norway) Malene Helgø (Slovakia) Šarlota Česneková
November 2	Stellenbosch, South Africa; Hard $10,000; Singles and doubles draws	(Namibia) Lesedi Sheya Jacobs; 7–6^{(7–3)}, 5–7, 6–1	(Germany) Luisa Marie Huber	(South Africa) Madrie Le Roux (Germany) Amelie Intert	(Hungary) Naomi Totka (United Kingdom) Gabriella Taylor (United States) Jaeda Daniel (China) Wang Danni
November 2	Stellenbosch, South Africa; Hard $10,000; Singles and doubles draws	(South Africa) Madrie Le Roux (Netherlands) Erika Vogelsang; 7–6^{(8–6)}, 6–2	(Zimbabwe) Valeria Bhunu (Namibia) Lesedi Sheya Jacobs	(South Africa) Madrie Le Roux (Germany) Amelie Intert	(Hungary) Naomi Totka (United Kingdom) Gabriella Taylor (United States) Jaeda Daniel (China) Wang Danni
November 2	Vinaròs, Spain; Clay $10,000; Singles and doubles draws	(Spain) Estrella Cabeza Candela; 6–2, 6–2	(Spain) Noelia Bouzó Zanotti	(Italy) Alice Savoretti (Hungary) Vanda Lukács	(France) Léa Tholey (France) Joséphine Boualem (Ukraine) Oleksandra Korashvili (Spain) María Martínez Martínez
November 2	Vinaròs, Spain; Clay $10,000; Singles and doubles draws	(Spain) Estrella Cabeza Candela (Ukraine) Oleksandra Korashvili; 6–2, 4–6, [10–5]	(Spain) Alicia Herrero Liñana (Russia) Ksenija Sharifova	(Italy) Alice Savoretti (Hungary) Vanda Lukács	(France) Léa Tholey (France) Joséphine Boualem (Ukraine) Oleksandra Korashvili (Spain) María Martínez Martínez
November 2	Stockholm, Sweden; Hard (indoor) $10,000; Singles and doubles draws	(France) Julie Gervais; 6–1, 6–4	(Ukraine) Anastasiya Shoshyna	(Germany) Anna Zaja (Switzerland) Tess Sugnaux	(France) Priscilla Heise (Sweden) Fanny Östlund (Germany) Nora Niedmers (Poland) Olga Brózda
November 2	Stockholm, Sweden; Hard (indoor) $10,000; Singles and doubles draws	(Poland) Olga Brózda (Ukraine) Anastasiya Shoshyna; 6–3, 6–2	(Italy) Deborah Chiesa (Estonia) Valeria Gorlats	(Germany) Anna Zaja (Switzerland) Tess Sugnaux	(France) Priscilla Heise (Sweden) Fanny Östlund (Germany) Nora Niedmers (Poland) Olga Brózda
November 2	Port El Kantaoui, Tunisia; Hard $10,000; Singles and doubles draws	(Ukraine) Valeriya Strakhova; 7–6^{(7–3)}, 3–0, ret.	(Germany) Katharina Hobgarski	(Romania) Daiana Negreanu (France) Laëtitia Sarrazin	(Tunisia) Chiraz Bechri (Czech Republic) Anna Slováková (United Kingdom) Mirabelle Njoze (Russia) Margarita Lazareva
November 2	Port El Kantaoui, Tunisia; Hard $10,000; Singles and doubles draws	(Poland) Patrycja Polańska (Czech Republic) Anna Slováková; 6–3, 2–6, [10–8]	(Romania) Daiana Negreanu (India) Kyra Shroff	(Romania) Daiana Negreanu (France) Laëtitia Sarrazin	(Tunisia) Chiraz Bechri (Czech Republic) Anna Slováková (United Kingdom) Mirabelle Njoze (Russia) Margarita Lazareva
November 2	Antalya, Turkey; Clay $10,000; Singles and doubles draws	(North Macedonia) Lina Gjorcheska; 6–3, 4–6, 6–0	(Russia) Aleksandra Pospelova	(China) Sun Xuliu (Slovakia) Vivien Juhászová	(Moldova) Iana Tishchenko (Germany) Lisa Matviyenko (China) Li Yuenu (Ukraine) Alona Fomina
November 2	Antalya, Turkey; Clay $10,000; Singles and doubles draws	(North Macedonia) Lina Gjorcheska (Croatia) Iva Primorac; 6–4, 6–3	(Ukraine) Gyulnara Nazarova (Russia) Aleksandra Pospelova	(China) Sun Xuliu (Slovakia) Vivien Juhászová	(Moldova) Iana Tishchenko (Germany) Lisa Matviyenko (China) Li Yuenu (Ukraine) Alona Fomina
November 9	Al Habtoor Tennis Challenge; Dubai, United Arab Emirates; Hard $75,000; Singles – Doubles	(Turkey) Çağla Büyükakçay; 6–7^{(4–7)}, 6–4, 6–4	(Czech Republic) Klára Koukalová	(Turkey) İpek Soylu (Russia) Alexandra Panova	(Romania) Alexandra Dulgheru (Slovakia) Kristína Kučová (Czech Republic) Tereza Martincová (Belgium) Elise Mertens
November 9	Al Habtoor Tennis Challenge; Dubai, United Arab Emirates; Hard $75,000; Singles – Doubles	(Turkey) Çağla Büyükakçay (Greece) Maria Sakkari; 7–6^{(8–6)}, 6–4	(Belgium) Elise Mertens (Turkey) İpek Soylu	(Turkey) İpek Soylu (Russia) Alexandra Panova	(Romania) Alexandra Dulgheru (Slovakia) Kristína Kučová (Czech Republic) Tereza Martincová (Belgium) Elise Mertens
November 9	Bendigo Women's International; Bendigo, Australia; Hard $50,000; Singles – Doubles	(Japan) Misa Eguchi; 7–6^{(7–5)}, 6–3	(Japan) Hiroko Kuwata	(Australia) Tammi Patterson (United States) Asia Muhammad	(Japan) Eri Hozumi (China) Zhang Yuxuan (Australia) Arina Rodionova (Netherlands) Cindy Burger
November 9	Bendigo Women's International; Bendigo, Australia; Hard $50,000; Singles – Doubles	(United States) Lauren Embree (United States) Asia Muhammad; 7–5, 6–3	(Russia) Natela Dzalamidze (Japan) Hiroko Kuwata	(Australia) Tammi Patterson (United States) Asia Muhammad	(Japan) Eri Hozumi (China) Zhang Yuxuan (Australia) Arina Rodionova (Netherlands) Cindy Burger
November 9	CopperWynd Pro Women's Challenge; Scottsdale, United States; Hard $50,000; Singles – Doubles	(United States) Samantha Crawford; 6–3, 4–6, 6–2	(Switzerland) Viktorija Golubic	(United States) Robin Anderson (Sweden) Rebecca Peterson	(Mexico) Victoria Rodríguez (Paraguay) Verónica Cepede Royg (United States) Vania King (Israel) Julia Glushko
November 9	CopperWynd Pro Women's Challenge; Scottsdale, United States; Hard $50,000; Singles – Doubles	(Israel) Julia Glushko (Sweden) Rebecca Peterson; 4–6, 7–5, [10–6]	(Switzerland) Viktorija Golubic (Liechtenstein) Stephanie Vogt	(United States) Robin Anderson (Sweden) Rebecca Peterson	(Mexico) Victoria Rodríguez (Paraguay) Verónica Cepede Royg (United States) Vania King (Israel) Julia Glushko
November 9	Minsk, Belarus; Hard (indoor) $25,000; Singles and doubles draws	(Russia) Irina Khromacheva; 6–2, 7–5	(Turkey) Başak Eraydın	(Belarus) Aryna Sabalenka (Belarus) Vera Lapko	(Romania) Irina Maria Bara (Serbia) Nina Stojanović (Russia) Veronika Kudermetova (Poland) Katarzyna Kawa
November 9	Minsk, Belarus; Hard (indoor) $25,000; Singles and doubles draws	(Turkey) Başak Eraydın (Russia) Veronika Kudermetova; 6–3, 6–1	(Russia) Anastasia Frolova (Russia) Ekaterina Yashina	(Belarus) Aryna Sabalenka (Belarus) Vera Lapko	(Romania) Irina Maria Bara (Serbia) Nina Stojanović (Russia) Veronika Kudermetova (Poland) Katarzyna Kawa
November 9	Équeurdreville, France; Hard (indoor) $25,000; Singles and doubles draws	(Netherlands) Lesley Kerkhove; 7–5, 6–3	(Georgia (country)) Sofia Shapatava	(Ukraine) Elizaveta Ianchuk (Germany) Tamara Korpatsch	(France) Stéphanie Foretz (France) Kinnie Laisné (France) Sherazad Reix (Romania) Alexandra Cadanțu
November 9	Équeurdreville, France; Hard (indoor) $25,000; Singles and doubles draws	(Romania) Alexandra Cadanțu (Netherlands) Lesley Kerkhove; 6–3, 6–4	(Ukraine) Elizaveta Ianchuk (France) Sherazad Reix	(Ukraine) Elizaveta Ianchuk (Germany) Tamara Korpatsch	(France) Stéphanie Foretz (France) Kinnie Laisné (France) Sherazad Reix (Romania) Alexandra Cadanțu
November 9	Slovak Open; Bratislava, Slovakia; Hard (indoor) $25,000; Singles and doubles draws	(Czech Republic) Jesika Malečková; 4–6, 7–6^{(7–3)}, 6–4	(Ukraine) Anhelina Kalinina	(Czech Republic) Markéta Vondroušová (Czech Republic) Karolína Muchová	(Slovakia) Natália Vajdová (Slovakia) Kristína Schmiedlová (Croatia) Silvia Njirić (Czech Republic) Andrea Hlaváčková
November 9	Slovak Open; Bratislava, Slovakia; Hard (indoor) $25,000; Singles and doubles draws	(Slovenia) Dalila Jakupović (Germany) Anne Schäfer; 6–7^{(5–7)}, 6–2, [10–8]	(Slovakia) Michaela Hončová (Slovakia) Chantal Škamlová	(Czech Republic) Markéta Vondroušová (Czech Republic) Karolína Muchová	(Slovakia) Natália Vajdová (Slovakia) Kristína Schmiedlová (Croatia) Silvia Njirić (Czech Republic) Andrea Hlaváčková
November 9	Aegon GB Pro-Series Bath; Bath, United Kingdom; Hard (indoor) $25,000; Singles and doubles draws	(Romania) Ana Bogdan; 6–3, 4–6, 6–1	(Croatia) Ana Vrljić	(Italy) Gioia Barbieri (Italy) Jasmine Paolini	(Turkey) Pemra Özgen (United Kingdom) Freya Christie (Switzerland) Conny Perrin (Georgia (country)) Mariam Bolkvadze
November 9	Aegon GB Pro-Series Bath; Bath, United Kingdom; Hard (indoor) $25,000; Singles and doubles draws	(United Kingdom) Sarah Beth Askew (United Kingdom) Olivia Nicholls; 1–6, 6–4, [10–2]	(United Kingdom) Freya Christie (United Kingdom) Lisa Whybourn	(Italy) Gioia Barbieri (Italy) Jasmine Paolini	(Turkey) Pemra Özgen (United Kingdom) Freya Christie (Switzerland) Conny Perrin (Georgia (country)) Mariam Bolkvadze
November 9	Sharm el-Sheikh, Egypt; Hard $10,000; Singles and doubles draws	(Kazakhstan) Kamila Kerimbayeva; 3–6, 6–1, 6–2	(Montenegro) Ana Veselinović	(China) You Xiaodi (Romania) Elena-Teodora Cadar	(Czech Republic) Martina Přádová (Belgium) Hélène Scholsen (France) Victoria Muntean (Romania) Ana Bianca Mihăilă
November 9	Sharm el-Sheikh, Egypt; Hard $10,000; Singles and doubles draws	(Kazakhstan) Kamila Kerimbayeva (Montenegro) Ana Veselinović; Walkover	(Romania) Ana Bianca Mihăilă (Belgium) Hélène Scholsen	(China) You Xiaodi (Romania) Elena-Teodora Cadar	(Czech Republic) Martina Přádová (Belgium) Hélène Scholsen (France) Victoria Muntean (Romania) Ana Bianca Mihăilă
November 9	Heraklion, Greece; Hard $10,000; Singles and doubles draws	(Bulgaria) Viktoriya Tomova; 3–6, 6–3, 6–3	(Croatia) Nina Alibalić	(Greece) Eleni Christofi (United Kingdom) Maia Lumsden	(Romania) Andreea Ghițescu (Switzerland) Karin Kennel (Thailand) Helen De Cesare (Slovenia) Eva Zagorac
November 9	Heraklion, Greece; Hard $10,000; Singles and doubles draws	(Switzerland) Karin Kennel (Bulgaria) Viktoriya Tomova; 6–2, 6–4	(Thailand) Helen De Cesare (Uzbekistan) Vlada Ekshibarova	(Greece) Eleni Christofi (United Kingdom) Maia Lumsden	(Romania) Andreea Ghițescu (Switzerland) Karin Kennel (Thailand) Helen De Cesare (Slovenia) Eva Zagorac
November 9	Casablanca, Morocco; Clay $10,000; Singles and doubles draws	(Slovenia) Pia Čuk; 6–4, ret.	(Italy) Stefania Rubini	(France) Alice Bacquié (Austria) Melanie Klaffner	(Russia) Anna Morgina (Romania) Cristina Adamescu (Austria) Julia Grabher (Serbia) Dejana Radanović
November 9	Casablanca, Morocco; Clay $10,000; Singles and doubles draws	(Spain) Olga Parres Azcoitia (Italy) Camilla Rosatello; 6–2, ret.	(Austria) Melanie Klaffner (Russia) Anna Morgina	(France) Alice Bacquié (Austria) Melanie Klaffner	(Russia) Anna Morgina (Romania) Cristina Adamescu (Austria) Julia Grabher (Serbia) Dejana Radanović
November 9	Stellenbosch, South Africa; Hard $10,000; Singles and doubles draws	(Zimbabwe) Valeria Bhunu; 6–4, 6–0	(Germany) Katharina Hering	(Germany) Luisa Marie Huber (United Kingdom) Gabriella Taylor	(Hungary) Naomi Totka (United States) Jaeda Daniel (South Africa) Madrie Le Roux (China) Shao Yijia
November 9	Stellenbosch, South Africa; Hard $10,000; Singles and doubles draws	(United Kingdom) Francesca Stephenson (Netherlands) Erika Vogelsang; 6–4, 6–4	(South Africa) Ilze Hattingh (South Africa) Madrie Le Roux	(Germany) Luisa Marie Huber (United Kingdom) Gabriella Taylor	(Hungary) Naomi Totka (United States) Jaeda Daniel (South Africa) Madrie Le Roux (China) Shao Yijia
November 9	Benicarló, Spain; Clay $10,000; Singles and doubles draws	(United Kingdom) Amanda Carreras; 6–3, 6–2	(Czech Republic) Diana Šumová	(France) Joséphine Boualem (Italy) Alice Savoretti	(Hungary) Vanda Lukács (Australia) Seone Mendez (Romania) Ioana Loredana Roșca (Spain) Estela Pérez Somarriba
November 9	Benicarló, Spain; Clay $10,000; Singles and doubles draws	(United Kingdom) Amanda Carreras (Italy) Alice Savoretti; 6–3, 6–2	(Ukraine) Oleksandra Korashvili (Romania) Ioana Loredana Roșca	(France) Joséphine Boualem (Italy) Alice Savoretti	(Hungary) Vanda Lukács (Australia) Seone Mendez (Romania) Ioana Loredana Roșca (Spain) Estela Pérez Somarriba
November 9	Port El Kantaoui, Tunisia; Hard $10,000; Singles and doubles draws	(Bosnia and Herzegovina) Jelena Simić; 3–6, 6–1, 6–4	(Bosnia and Herzegovina) Ema Burgić Bucko	(Germany) Katharina Hobgarski (Russia) Anna Kalinskaya	(Algeria) Amira Benaissa (United Kingdom) Mirabelle Njoze (Tunisia) Chiraz Bechri (Switzerland) Lisa Sabino
November 9	Port El Kantaoui, Tunisia; Hard $10,000; Singles and doubles draws	(Bosnia and Herzegovina) Ema Burgić Bucko (Bosnia and Herzegovina) Jelena Simić; 7–6^{(7–4)}, 6–4	(United Kingdom) Mirabelle Njoze (United States) Miranda Ramirez	(Germany) Katharina Hobgarski (Russia) Anna Kalinskaya	(Algeria) Amira Benaissa (United Kingdom) Mirabelle Njoze (Tunisia) Chiraz Bechri (Switzerland) Lisa Sabino
November 9	Antalya, Turkey; Clay $10,000; Singles and doubles draws	(Russia) Alisa Kleybanova; 6–3, 6–4	(North Macedonia) Lina Gjorcheska	(Ukraine) Gyulnara Nazarova (Netherlands) Mandy Wagemaker	(Moldova) Anastasia Vdovenco (Russia) Aleksandra Pospelova (Hungary) Ágnes Bukta (China) Sun Xuliu
November 9	Antalya, Turkey; Clay $10,000; Singles and doubles draws	(North Macedonia) Lina Gjorcheska (Croatia) Iva Primorac; 6–4, 4–6, [13–11]	(Ukraine) Alona Fomina (Germany) Christina Shakovets	(Ukraine) Gyulnara Nazarova (Netherlands) Mandy Wagemaker	(Moldova) Anastasia Vdovenco (Russia) Aleksandra Pospelova (Hungary) Ágnes Bukta (China) Sun Xuliu
November 9	Caracas, Venezuela; Hard $10,000; Singles and doubles draws	(Argentina) Catalina Pella; 6–2, 6–3	(Argentina) Julieta Estable	(Brazil) Laura Pigossi (Russia) Anzhelika Isaeva	(Argentina) Victoria Bosio (Guatemala) Andrea Weedon (United States) Shelby Talcott (Argentina) Ana Victoria Gobbi Monllau
November 9	Caracas, Venezuela; Hard $10,000; Singles and doubles draws	(Argentina) Catalina Pella (Brazil) Laura Pigossi; 5–7, 6–1, [10–4]	(Romania) Jaqueline Cristian (Venezuela) Aymet Uzcátegui	(Brazil) Laura Pigossi (Russia) Anzhelika Isaeva	(Argentina) Victoria Bosio (Guatemala) Andrea Weedon (United States) Shelby Talcott (Argentina) Ana Victoria Gobbi Monllau
November 16	Ando Securities Open; Tokyo, Japan; Hard $100,000; Singles – Doubles	(China) Zhang Shuai; 6–4, 6–1	(Japan) Nao Hibino	(Chinese Taipei) Hsieh Su-wei (Japan) Kurumi Nara	(Japan) Shiho Akita (Japan) Ayaka Okuno (China) Wang Qiang (Thailand) Varatchaya Wongteanchai
November 16	Ando Securities Open; Tokyo, Japan; Hard $100,000; Singles – Doubles	(Japan) Shuko Aoyama (Japan) Makoto Ninomiya; 3–6, 6–2, [10–7]	(Japan) Eri Hozumi (Japan) Kurumi Nara	(Chinese Taipei) Hsieh Su-wei (Japan) Kurumi Nara	(Japan) Shiho Akita (Japan) Ayaka Okuno (China) Wang Qiang (Thailand) Varatchaya Wongteanchai
November 16	Zawada, Poland; Carpet (indoor) $25,000; Singles and doubles draws	(Serbia) Ivana Jorović; 6–2, 6–2	(Romania) Mihaela Buzărnescu	(Czech Republic) Karolína Muchová (Slovenia) Dalila Jakupović	(Slovenia) Tamara Zidanšek (Romania) Cristina Dinu (Slovakia) Kristína Schmiedlová (Czech Republic) Tereza Malíková
November 16	Zawada, Poland; Carpet (indoor) $25,000; Singles and doubles draws	(Romania) Mihaela Buzărnescu (Poland) Justyna Jegiołka; 6–2, 6–3	(Germany) Kim Grajdek (Russia) Ekaterina Yashina	(Czech Republic) Karolína Muchová (Slovenia) Dalila Jakupović	(Slovenia) Tamara Zidanšek (Romania) Cristina Dinu (Slovakia) Kristína Schmiedlová (Czech Republic) Tereza Malíková
November 16	Aegon GB Pro-Series Shrewsbury; Shrewsbury, United Kingdom; Hard (indoor) $25,000; Singles and doubles draws	(France) Océane Dodin; 7–6^{(7–3)}, 7–5	(United Kingdom) Freya Christie	(Netherlands) Lesley Kerkhove (Belgium) Greet Minnen	(Georgia (country)) Mariam Bolkvadze (Uzbekistan) Akgul Amanmuradova (Croatia) Ana Vrljić (Switzerland) Xenia Knoll
November 16	Aegon GB Pro-Series Shrewsbury; Shrewsbury, United Kingdom; Hard (indoor) $25,000; Singles and doubles draws	(Switzerland) Xenia Knoll (Italy) Alice Matteucci; 3–6, 6–3, [10–3]	(Netherlands) Lesley Kerkhove (Netherlands) Quirine Lemoine	(Netherlands) Lesley Kerkhove (Belgium) Greet Minnen	(Georgia (country)) Mariam Bolkvadze (Uzbekistan) Akgul Amanmuradova (Croatia) Ana Vrljić (Switzerland) Xenia Knoll
November 16	Orto-Lääkärit Open; Helsinki, Finland; Carpet (indoor) $10,000; Singles and doubles draws	(Russia) Alena Tarasova; 6–3, 6–3	(Germany) Caroline Werner	(Finland) Emma Laine (Estonia) Valeria Gorlats	(Russia) Daria Mishina (Norway) Emma Flood (Belgium) Klaartje Liebens (Belgium) Magali Kempen
November 16	Orto-Lääkärit Open; Helsinki, Finland; Carpet (indoor) $10,000; Singles and doubles draws	(Russia) Daria Lodikova (Russia) Daria Mishina; 3–6, 6–2, [10–5]	(Belgium) Magali Kempen (Netherlands) Kelly Versteeg	(Finland) Emma Laine (Estonia) Valeria Gorlats	(Russia) Daria Mishina (Norway) Emma Flood (Belgium) Klaartje Liebens (Belgium) Magali Kempen
November 16	Gulbarga, India; Hard $10,000; Singles and doubles draws	(India) Prerna Bhambri; 4–6, 7–5, 6–4	(India) Riya Bhatia	(Thailand) Tamachan Momkoonthod (India) Eetee Maheta	(India) Kanika Vaidya (India) Snehadevi Reddy (India) Sharmada Balu (India) Natasha Palha
November 16	Gulbarga, India; Hard $10,000; Singles and doubles draws	(India) Dhruthi Tatachar Venugopal (India) Karman Thandi; 1–6, 6–3, [10–7]	(India) Prerna Bhambri (India) Kanika Vaidya	(Thailand) Tamachan Momkoonthod (India) Eetee Maheta	(India) Kanika Vaidya (India) Snehadevi Reddy (India) Sharmada Balu (India) Natasha Palha
November 16	Casablanca, Morocco; Clay $10,000; Singles and doubles draws	(Italy) Corinna Dentoni; 7–6^{(7–0)}, 6–3	(Austria) Julia Grabher	(Oman) Fatma Al-Nabhani (Romania) Irina Fetecău	(Italy) Camilla Rosatello (Romania) Cristina Adamescu (Russia) Vasilisa Aponasenko (Romania) Camelia Hristea
November 16	Casablanca, Morocco; Clay $10,000; Singles and doubles draws	(Spain) Olga Parres Azcoitia (Italy) Camilla Rosatello; 6–4, 6–3	(Romania) Irina Fetecău (Romania) Camelia Hristea	(Oman) Fatma Al-Nabhani (Romania) Irina Fetecău	(Italy) Camilla Rosatello (Romania) Cristina Adamescu (Russia) Vasilisa Aponasenko (Romania) Camelia Hristea
November 16	Stellenbosch, South Africa; Hard $10,000; Singles and doubles draws	(United Kingdom) Gabriella Taylor; 4–6, 6–2, 6–1	(Hungary) Naomi Totka	(Germany) Luisa Marie Huber (Germany) Amelie Intert	(South Africa) Madrie Le Roux (South Africa) Ilze Hattingh (Austria) Nicole Rottmann (Zimbabwe) Valeria Bhunu
November 16	Stellenbosch, South Africa; Hard $10,000; Singles and doubles draws	(South Africa) Ilze Hattingh (South Africa) Madrie Le Roux; 6–1, 7–6^{(7–5)}	(Germany) Katharina Hering (Hungary) Naomi Totka	(Germany) Luisa Marie Huber (Germany) Amelie Intert	(South Africa) Madrie Le Roux (South Africa) Ilze Hattingh (Austria) Nicole Rottmann (Zimbabwe) Valeria Bhunu
November 16	Castellón, Spain; Clay $10,000; Singles and doubles draws	(Spain) Irene Burillo Escorihuela; 6–2, 6–2	(Australia) Isabelle Wallace	(Italy) Gaia Sanesi (Ukraine) Oleksandra Korashvili	(Venezuela) Andrea Gámiz (Spain) Olga Sáez Larra (France) Joséphine Boualem (Czech Republic) Diana Šumová
November 16	Castellón, Spain; Clay $10,000; Singles and doubles draws	(Spain) Noelia Bouzó Zanotti (Spain) Olga Sáez Larra; 6–3, 7–5	(Ukraine) Oleksandra Korashvili (Romania) Ioana Loredana Roșca	(Italy) Gaia Sanesi (Ukraine) Oleksandra Korashvili	(Venezuela) Andrea Gámiz (Spain) Olga Sáez Larra (France) Joséphine Boualem (Czech Republic) Diana Šumová
November 16	Port El Kantaoui, Tunisia; Hard $10,000; Singles and doubles draws	(Bosnia and Herzegovina) Ema Burgić Bucko; Walkover	(Russia) Anna Kalinskaya	(France) Laëtitia Sarrazin (Bosnia and Herzegovina) Jelena Simić	(Russia) Margarita Lazareva (Slovenia) Pia Čuk (France) Victoria Muntean (Germany) Julia Wachaczyk
November 16	Port El Kantaoui, Tunisia; Hard $10,000; Singles and doubles draws	(Russia) Margarita Lazareva (Germany) Julia Wachaczyk; 6–4, 6–4	(Hungary) Bianka Békefi (Hungary) Szabina Szlavikovics	(France) Laëtitia Sarrazin (Bosnia and Herzegovina) Jelena Simić	(Russia) Margarita Lazareva (Slovenia) Pia Čuk (France) Victoria Muntean (Germany) Julia Wachaczyk
November 16	Antalya, Turkey; Clay $10,000; Singles and doubles draws	(Georgia (country)) Ekaterine Gorgodze; 7–5, 6–7^{(3–7)}, 6–3	(Russia) Elena Rybakina	(Bulgaria) Julia Stamatova (Hungary) Anna Bondár	(Bulgaria) Dia Evtimova (China) Li Yuenu (Hungary) Ágnes Bukta (United States) Dasha Ivanova
November 16	Antalya, Turkey; Clay $10,000; Singles and doubles draws	(Hungary) Ágnes Bukta (Slovakia) Vivien Juhászová; 7–5, 6–3	(Hungary) Anna Bondár (Hungary) Rebeka Stolmár	(Bulgaria) Julia Stamatova (Hungary) Anna Bondár	(Bulgaria) Dia Evtimova (China) Li Yuenu (Hungary) Ágnes Bukta (United States) Dasha Ivanova
November 16	Caracas, Venezuela; Hard $10,000; Singles and doubles draws	(Argentina) Catalina Pella; 3–6, 6–4, 6–0	(Argentina) Victoria Bosio	(Argentina) Julieta Estable (Brazil) Laura Pigossi	(Venezuela) María Linares de Faría (Argentina) Ana Victoria Gobbi Monllau (Russia) Anastasia Nefedova (Russia) Nika Kukharchuk
November 16	Caracas, Venezuela; Hard $10,000; Singles and doubles draws	(Argentina) Catalina Pella (Brazil) Laura Pigossi; 1–1, ret.	(Argentina) Julieta Estable (Argentina) Ana Victoria Gobbi Monllau	(Argentina) Julieta Estable (Brazil) Laura Pigossi	(Venezuela) María Linares de Faría (Argentina) Ana Victoria Gobbi Monllau (Russia) Anastasia Nefedova (Russia) Nika Kukharchuk
November 23	Dunlop World Challenge; Toyota, Japan; Carpet (indoor) $75,000; Singles – Doubles	(Croatia) Jana Fett; 6–4, 4–6, 6–4	(Thailand) Luksika Kumkhum	(Russia) Ksenia Lykina (Japan) Naomi Osaka	(Georgia (country)) Sofia Shapatava (Japan) Risa Ozaki (Italy) Martina Caregaro (Japan) Misa Eguchi
November 23	Dunlop World Challenge; Toyota, Japan; Carpet (indoor) $75,000; Singles – Doubles	(Japan) Akiko Omae (Thailand) Peangtarn Plipuech; 3–6, 6–0, [11–9]	(Thailand) Luksika Kumkhum (Japan) Yuuki Tanaka	(Russia) Ksenia Lykina (Japan) Naomi Osaka	(Georgia (country)) Sofia Shapatava (Japan) Risa Ozaki (Italy) Martina Caregaro (Japan) Misa Eguchi
November 23	Santiago, Chile; Clay $10,000; Singles and doubles draws	(Chile) Daniela Seguel; 2–6, 6–2, ret.	(Argentina) Catalina Pella	(Paraguay) Montserrat González (Mexico) Renata Zarazúa	(Chile) Fernanda Brito (Argentina) Guadalupe Pérez Rojas (Argentina) Nadia Podoroska (Argentina) Julieta Estable
November 23	Santiago, Chile; Clay $10,000; Singles and doubles draws	(Paraguay) Montserrat González (Mexico) Ana Sofía Sánchez; 6–4, 7–6^{(7–3)}	(Argentina) Catalina Pella (Chile) Daniela Seguel	(Paraguay) Montserrat González (Mexico) Renata Zarazúa	(Chile) Fernanda Brito (Argentina) Guadalupe Pérez Rojas (Argentina) Nadia Podoroska (Argentina) Julieta Estable
November 23	Pereira, Colombia; Clay $10,000; Singles and doubles draws	(Brazil) Laura Pigossi; 5–7, 6–0, 6–2	(Argentina) Victoria Bosio	(Romania) Jaqueline Cristian (United States) Madison Bourguignon	(United States) Madeleine Kobelt (Colombia) María Paulina Pérez (Colombia) Yuliana Monroy (Colombia) Sofía Múnera Sánchez
November 23	Pereira, Colombia; Clay $10,000; Singles and doubles draws	(Romania) Jaqueline Cristian (Brazil) Laura Pigossi; 7–5, 6–3	(Colombia) María Fernanda Herazo (United States) Danielle Roldan	(Romania) Jaqueline Cristian (United States) Madison Bourguignon	(United States) Madeleine Kobelt (Colombia) María Paulina Pérez (Colombia) Yuliana Monroy (Colombia) Sofía Múnera Sánchez
November 23	Cairo, Egypt; Clay $10,000; Singles and doubles draws	(Hungary) Naomi Totka; 6–2, 6–1	(Ukraine) Helen Ploskina	(United Kingdom) Emily Appleton (Turkey) Berfu Cengiz	(Australia) Elizabeth James (Egypt) Ola Abou Zekry (Egypt) Laila Elnimr (France) Julie Razafindranaly
November 23	Cairo, Egypt; Clay $10,000; Singles and doubles draws	(Egypt) Sandra Samir (Hungary) Naomi Totka; 7–5, 6–7^{(9–11)}, [13–11]	(Egypt) Ola Abou Zekry (Romania) Ana Bianca Mihăilă	(United Kingdom) Emily Appleton (Turkey) Berfu Cengiz	(Australia) Elizabeth James (Egypt) Ola Abou Zekry (Egypt) Laila Elnimr (France) Julie Razafindranaly
November 23	Gulbarga, India; Hard $10,000; Singles and doubles draws	(India) Prerna Bhambri; 6–0, 6–4	(India) Natasha Palha	(Thailand) Tamachan Momkoonthod (India) Eetee Maheta	(India) Nidhi Chilumula (India) Aastha Dargude (India) Prarthana Thombare (India) Sai Chamarthi
November 23	Gulbarga, India; Hard $10,000; Singles and doubles draws	(India) Dhruthi Tatachar Venugopal (India) Karman Thandi; 6–4, 6–7^{(5–7)}, [10–7]	(India) Nidhi Chilumula (India) Eetee Maheta	(Thailand) Tamachan Momkoonthod (India) Eetee Maheta	(India) Nidhi Chilumula (India) Aastha Dargude (India) Prarthana Thombare (India) Sai Chamarthi
November 23	Ramat Gan, Israel; Hard $10,000; Singles and doubles draws	(Czech Republic) Barbora Štefková; 6–1, 6–4	(Russia) Olga Doroshina	(France) Eléonore Barrère (United States) Alexandra Morozova	(Uzbekistan) Vlada Ekshibarova (Ukraine) Daria Orichkevitch (Israel) Keren Shlomo (Chinese Taipei) Hsu Ching-wen
November 23	Ramat Gan, Israel; Hard $10,000; Singles and doubles draws	(Russia) Olga Doroshina (Uzbekistan) Vlada Ekshibarova; 6–2, 6–2	(United States) Alexandra Morozova (Czech Republic) Barbora Štefková	(France) Eléonore Barrère (United States) Alexandra Morozova	(Uzbekistan) Vlada Ekshibarova (Ukraine) Daria Orichkevitch (Israel) Keren Shlomo (Chinese Taipei) Hsu Ching-wen
November 23	Rabat, Morocco; Clay $10,000; Singles and doubles draws	(France) Léa Tholey; 6–4, 6–1	(Romania) Cristina Adamescu	(Oman) Fatma Al-Nabhani (Belgium) Déborah Kerfs	(Belgium) Catherine Chantraine (Portugal) Sara Lança (Italy) Miriana Tona (Slovenia) Pia Brglez
November 23	Rabat, Morocco; Clay $10,000; Singles and doubles draws	(Oman) Fatma Al-Nabhani (Spain) Olga Parres Azcoitia; 7–6^{(7–5)}, 7–5	(France) Léa Tholey (Italy) Miriana Tona	(Oman) Fatma Al-Nabhani (Belgium) Déborah Kerfs	(Belgium) Catherine Chantraine (Portugal) Sara Lança (Italy) Miriana Tona (Slovenia) Pia Brglez
November 23	Nules, Spain; Clay $10,000; Singles and doubles draws	(Ukraine) Oleksandra Korashvili; 6–4, 6–7^{(7–9)}, 7–6^{(7–3)}	(Venezuela) Andrea Gámiz	(Spain) Olga Sáez Larra (United Kingdom) Amanda Carreras	(Australia) Isabelle Wallace (Italy) Alice Savoretti (Australia) Seone Mendez (Italy) Federico Arcidiacono
November 23	Nules, Spain; Clay $10,000; Singles and doubles draws	(Ecuador) Charlotte Römer (Spain) Olga Sáez Larra; 6–2, 6–3	(Spain) Ariadna Martí Riembau (Spain) Marta Sexmilo Pascual	(Spain) Olga Sáez Larra (United Kingdom) Amanda Carreras	(Australia) Isabelle Wallace (Italy) Alice Savoretti (Australia) Seone Mendez (Italy) Federico Arcidiacono
November 23	Port El Kantaoui, Tunisia; Hard $10,000; Singles and doubles draws	(Bulgaria) Isabella Shinikova; 6–1, 6–2	(Tunisia) Chiraz Bechri	(Russia) Yana Sizikova (Spain) Miriam Civera Lima	(Sweden) Kajsa Rinaldo Persson (Slovenia) Natalija Šipek (France) Victoria Muntean (Belgium) Britt Geukens
November 23	Port El Kantaoui, Tunisia; Hard $10,000; Singles and doubles draws	(Sweden) Linnéa Malmqvist (Russia) Yana Sizikova; 6–4, 6–2	(Sweden) Kajsa Rinaldo Persson (Slovenia) Natalija Šipek	(Russia) Yana Sizikova (Spain) Miriam Civera Lima	(Sweden) Kajsa Rinaldo Persson (Slovenia) Natalija Šipek (France) Victoria Muntean (Belgium) Britt Geukens
November 23	Antalya, Turkey; Clay $10,000; Singles and doubles draws	(Hungary) Anna Bondár; 6–3, 6–4	(Russia) Alisa Kleybanova	(Romania) Raluca Șerban (Moldova) Anastasia Vdovenco	(Japan) Akiho Kakuya (Ukraine) Alyona Sotnikova (Georgia (country)) Ekaterine Gorgodze (Bulgaria) Dia Evtimova
November 23	Antalya, Turkey; Clay $10,000; Singles and doubles draws	(Hungary) Anna Bondár (Hungary) Rebeka Stolmár; 2–6, 6–4, [10–2]	(Georgia (country)) Sofia Kvatsabaia (Germany) Julyette Steur	(Romania) Raluca Șerban (Moldova) Anastasia Vdovenco	(Japan) Akiho Kakuya (Ukraine) Alyona Sotnikova (Georgia (country)) Ekaterine Gorgodze (Bulgaria) Dia Evtimova
November 30	Santiago, Chile; Clay $25,000; Singles and doubles draws	(Paraguay) Verónica Cepede Royg; 6–0, 2–6, 7–5	(Germany) Anne Schäfer	(Argentina) Victoria Bosio (Mexico) Ana Sofía Sánchez	(Chile) Daniela Seguel (Argentina) Catalina Pella (Brazil) Laura Pigossi (Argentina) Nadia Podoroska
November 30	Santiago, Chile; Clay $25,000; Singles and doubles draws	(Mexico) Victoria Rodríguez (Mexico) Renata Zarazúa; 6–2, 5–7, [10–7]	(Argentina) Florencia Molinero (Brazil) Laura Pigossi	(Argentina) Victoria Bosio (Mexico) Ana Sofía Sánchez	(Chile) Daniela Seguel (Argentina) Catalina Pella (Brazil) Laura Pigossi (Argentina) Nadia Podoroska
November 30	Cairo, Egypt; Clay $10,000; Singles and doubles draws	(Austria) Melanie Klaffner; 6–4, 6–2	(Hungary) Naomi Totka	(Georgia (country)) Sofia Shapatava (Austria) Julia Grabher	(Egypt) Sandra Samir (Australia) Elizabeth James (Russia) Anna Morgina (Ukraine) Helen Ploskina
November 30	Cairo, Egypt; Clay $10,000; Singles and doubles draws	(Austria) Julia Grabher (Romania) Ana Bianca Mihăilă; 6–2, 6–4	(Russia) Anna Morgina (Poland) Patrycja Polańska	(Georgia (country)) Sofia Shapatava (Austria) Julia Grabher	(Egypt) Sandra Samir (Australia) Elizabeth James (Russia) Anna Morgina (Ukraine) Helen Ploskina
November 30	Ramat Gan, Israel; Hard $10,000; Singles and doubles draws	(Israel) Deniz Khazaniuk; 7–6^{(8–6)}, 6–3	(Russia) Olga Doroshina	(Russia) Margarita Skryabina (United States) Alexandra Morozova	(Russia) Daria Lodikova (Israel) Keren Shlomo (Israel) Saray Sterenbach (Uzbekistan) Vlada Ekshibarova
November 30	Ramat Gan, Israel; Hard $10,000; Singles and doubles draws	(United States) Alexandra Morozova (Czech Republic) Barbora Štefková; 6–2, 7–5	(Uzbekistan) Vlada Ekshibarova (Russia) Daria Lodikova	(Russia) Margarita Skryabina (United States) Alexandra Morozova	(Russia) Daria Lodikova (Israel) Keren Shlomo (Israel) Saray Sterenbach (Uzbekistan) Vlada Ekshibarova
November 30	Port El Kantaoui, Tunisia; Hard $10,000; Singles and doubles draws	(Bulgaria) Isabella Shinikova; 6–3, 6–2	(Russia) Yana Sizikova	(Slovenia) Natalija Šipek (Belgium) Klaartje Liebens	(Moldova) Alexandra Perper (United Kingdom) Mirabelle Njoze (Slovakia) Martina Okáľová (Switzerland) Karin Kennel
November 30	Port El Kantaoui, Tunisia; Hard $10,000; Singles and doubles draws	(Switzerland) Karin Kennel (Bulgaria) Isabella Shinikova; 4–6, 6–3, [10–7]	(Belarus) Darya Chernetsova (Russia) Yana Sizikova	(Slovenia) Natalija Šipek (Belgium) Klaartje Liebens	(Moldova) Alexandra Perper (United Kingdom) Mirabelle Njoze (Slovakia) Martina Okáľová (Switzerland) Karin Kennel
November 30	Antalya, Turkey; Clay $10,000; Singles and doubles draws	(Russia) Alisa Kleybanova; 6–4, 6–3	(Armenia) Ani Amiraghyan	(Austria) Marlies Szupper (Georgia (country)) Ekaterine Gorgodze	(Bulgaria) Dia Evtimova (Georgia (country)) Sofia Kvatsabaia (Romania) Elena Ruse (Bulgaria) Ani Vangelova
November 30	Antalya, Turkey; Clay $10,000; Singles and doubles draws	(Germany) Christina Shakovets (Ukraine) Alyona Sotnikova; 7–5, 6–4	(Ukraine) Alona Fomina (Georgia (country)) Sofia Kvatsabaia	(Austria) Marlies Szupper (Georgia (country)) Ekaterine Gorgodze	(Bulgaria) Dia Evtimova (Georgia (country)) Sofia Kvatsabaia (Romania) Elena Ruse (Bulgaria) Ani Vangelova

=== December ===
Week of	Tournament	Winner	Runners-up	Semifinalists	Quarterfinalists
December 7	Cairo, Egypt; Clay $25,000; Singles and doubles draws	(Romania) Mihaela Buzărnescu; 6–0, 6–3	(Russia) Valentyna Ivakhnenko	(Italy) Martina Caregaro (Austria) Melanie Klaffner	(Romania) Irina Maria Bara (Slovenia) Dalila Jakupović (Russia) Polina Leykina (Hungary) Réka-Luca Jani
December 7	Cairo, Egypt; Clay $25,000; Singles and doubles draws	(Russia) Valentyna Ivakhnenko (Slovenia) Dalila Jakupović; Walkover	(Italy) Martina Caregaro (Hungary) Réka-Luca Jani	(Italy) Martina Caregaro (Austria) Melanie Klaffner	(Romania) Irina Maria Bara (Slovenia) Dalila Jakupović (Russia) Polina Leykina (Hungary) Réka-Luca Jani
December 7	Lagos, Nigeria; Hard $25,000; Singles and doubles draws	(France) Tessah Andrianjafitrimo; 6–3, 5–7, 6–4	(Slovenia) Tadeja Majerič	(Norway) Ulrikke Eikeri (Switzerland) Conny Perrin	(France) Sherazad Reix (Bulgaria) Julia Terziyska (India) Prarthana Thombare (Ukraine) Valeriya Strakhova
December 7	Lagos, Nigeria; Hard $25,000; Singles and doubles draws	(Russia) Margarita Lazareva (Ukraine) Valeriya Strakhova; 6–1, 6–2	(Zimbabwe) Valeria Bhunu (Israel) Ester Masuri	(Norway) Ulrikke Eikeri (Switzerland) Conny Perrin	(France) Sherazad Reix (Bulgaria) Julia Terziyska (India) Prarthana Thombare (Ukraine) Valeriya Strakhova
December 7	Victoria Park, Hong Kong; Hard $10,000; Singles and doubles draws	(China) Tian Ran; 6–2, 6–3	(Finland) Emma Laine	(China) Xun Fangying (United States) Tori Kinard	(China) Gai Ao (Chinese Taipei) Lee Pei-chi (China) Kang Jiaqi (South Korea) Han Sung-hee
December 7	Victoria Park, Hong Kong; Hard $10,000; Singles and doubles draws	(South Korea) Han Sung-hee (South Korea) Kim Na-ri; 3–6, 6–3, [10–8]	(Finland) Emma Laine (Japan) Yukina Saigo	(China) Xun Fangying (United States) Tori Kinard	(China) Gai Ao (Chinese Taipei) Lee Pei-chi (China) Kang Jiaqi (South Korea) Han Sung-hee
December 7	Indore, India; Hard $10,000; Singles and doubles draws	(Ukraine) Anastasiya Vasylyeva; 7–5, 2–6, 6–2	(India) Karman Thandi	(United Kingdom) Katy Dunne (India) Prerna Bhambri	(India) Dhruthi Tatachar Venugopal (Croatia) Silvia Njirić (China) Sun Xuliu (India) Natasha Palha
December 7	Indore, India; Hard $10,000; Singles and doubles draws	(Ukraine) Veronika Kapshay (Ukraine) Anastasiya Vasylyeva; 6–1, 6–3	(India) Dhruthi Tatachar Venugopal (India) Karman Thandi	(United Kingdom) Katy Dunne (India) Prerna Bhambri	(India) Dhruthi Tatachar Venugopal (Croatia) Silvia Njirić (China) Sun Xuliu (India) Natasha Palha
December 7	Internazionali Tennis Val Gardena Südtirol; Ortisei, Italy; Hard (indoor) $10,000; Singles and doubles draws	(Italy) Georgia Brescia; 6–4, 4–6, 6–3	(Liechtenstein) Kathinka von Deichmann	(Croatia) Adrijana Lekaj (Switzerland) Xenia Knoll	(Germany) Julia Thiem (Italy) Anna Turati (Italy) Martina Di Giuseppe (Germany) Anna Klasen
December 7	Internazionali Tennis Val Gardena Südtirol; Ortisei, Italy; Hard (indoor) $10,000; Singles and doubles draws	(Italy) Deborah Chiesa (Croatia) Adrijana Lekaj; 6–1, 6–3	(Switzerland) Chiara Grimm (Switzerland) Nina Stadler	(Croatia) Adrijana Lekaj (Switzerland) Xenia Knoll	(Germany) Julia Thiem (Italy) Anna Turati (Italy) Martina Di Giuseppe (Germany) Anna Klasen
December 7	Port El Kantaoui, Tunisia; Hard $10,000; Singles and doubles draws	(Bulgaria) Isabella Shinikova; 7–5, 6–1	(Russia) Marta Paigina	(Switzerland) Karin Kennel (Moldova) Alexandra Perper	(France) Léa Romain (Sweden) Kajsa Rinaldo Persson (France) Kélia Le Bihan (France) Kassandra Davesne
December 7	Port El Kantaoui, Tunisia; Hard $10,000; Singles and doubles draws	(France) Mathilde Armitano (France) Valentine Bacher; 6–3, 6–2	(Belarus) Darya Chernetsova (Russia) Marta Paigina	(Switzerland) Karin Kennel (Moldova) Alexandra Perper	(France) Léa Romain (Sweden) Kajsa Rinaldo Persson (France) Kélia Le Bihan (France) Kassandra Davesne
December 7	Antalya, Turkey; Clay $10,000; Singles and doubles draws	(Romania) Elena Ruse; 1–6, 7–6^{(7–3)}, 6–2	(Georgia (country)) Ekaterine Gorgodze	(Brazil) Laura Pigossi (Georgia (country)) Sofia Kvatsabaia	(Ukraine) Alona Fomina (Denmark) Julie Noe (Austria) Marlies Szupper (Bulgaria) Petia Arshinkova
December 7	Antalya, Turkey; Clay $10,000; Singles and doubles draws	(Ukraine) Alona Fomina (Germany) Christina Shakovets; 7–6^{(7–4)}, 6–2	(Denmark) Julie Noe (Romania) Elena Ruse	(Brazil) Laura Pigossi (Georgia (country)) Sofia Kvatsabaia	(Ukraine) Alona Fomina (Denmark) Julie Noe (Austria) Marlies Szupper (Bulgaria) Petia Arshinkova
December 14	Ankara Cup; Ankara, Turkey; Hard (indoor) $50,000; Singles – Doubles	(Serbia) Ivana Jorović; 7–6^{(7–3)}, 3–6, 6–2	(Turkey) Çağla Büyükakçay	(Croatia) Jana Fett (Romania) Alexandra Cadanțu	(Netherlands) Cindy Burger (Russia) Natalia Vikhlyantseva (Romania) Cristina Dinu (Netherlands) Lesley Kerkhove
December 14	Ankara Cup; Ankara, Turkey; Hard (indoor) $50,000; Singles – Doubles	(Spain) María José Martínez Sánchez (Russia) Marina Melnikova; 6–4, 5–7, [10–8]	(Poland) Paula Kania (Netherlands) Lesley Kerkhove	(Croatia) Jana Fett (Romania) Alexandra Cadanțu	(Netherlands) Cindy Burger (Russia) Natalia Vikhlyantseva (Romania) Cristina Dinu (Netherlands) Lesley Kerkhove
December 14	Navi Mumbai, India; Hard $25,000; Singles and doubles draws	(Austria) Barbara Haas; 7–6^{(7–2)}, 7–6^{(8–6)}	(Belarus) Aryna Sabalenka	(Serbia) Doroteja Erić (Russia) Polina Leykina	(China) Lu Jiajing (Russia) Anna Morgina (Spain) Georgina García Pérez (Ukraine) Anastasiya Vasylyeva
December 14	Navi Mumbai, India; Hard $25,000; Singles and doubles draws	(Russia) Anna Morgina (Serbia) Nina Stojanović; 6–3, 7–5	(Russia) Polina Leykina (China) Lu Jiajing	(Serbia) Doroteja Erić (Russia) Polina Leykina	(China) Lu Jiajing (Russia) Anna Morgina (Spain) Georgina García Pérez (Ukraine) Anastasiya Vasylyeva
December 14	Lagos, Nigeria; Hard $25,000; Singles and doubles draws	(Switzerland) Conny Perrin; 3–6, 6–4, 7–6^{(8–6)}	(Slovenia) Tadeja Majerič	(Ukraine) Valeriya Strakhova (Bulgaria) Julia Terziyska	(Norway) Ulrikke Eikeri (India) Prarthana Thombare (China) Zhao Xiaoxi (France) Tessah Andrianjafitrimo
December 14	Lagos, Nigeria; Hard $25,000; Singles and doubles draws	(Bulgaria) Julia Terziyska (India) Prarthana Thombare; 4–6, 6–3, [10–8]	(Slovenia) Tadeja Majerič (Switzerland) Conny Perrin	(Ukraine) Valeriya Strakhova (Bulgaria) Julia Terziyska	(Norway) Ulrikke Eikeri (India) Prarthana Thombare (China) Zhao Xiaoxi (France) Tessah Andrianjafitrimo
December 14	Bangkok, Thailand; Hard $25,000; Singles and doubles draws	(Estonia) Kaia Kanepi; 6–3, 6–3	(Switzerland) Patty Schnyder	(France) Myrtille Georges (Russia) Irina Khromacheva	(Japan) Makoto Ninomiya (Thailand) Peangtarn Plipuech (Uzbekistan) Sabina Sharipova (Russia) Victoria Kan
December 14	Bangkok, Thailand; Hard $25,000; Singles and doubles draws	(Russia) Irina Khromacheva (Russia) Valeria Solovyeva; 5–7, 6–4, [12–10]	(Indonesia) Jessy Rompies (Thailand) Nungnadda Wannasuk	(France) Myrtille Georges (Russia) Irina Khromacheva	(Japan) Makoto Ninomiya (Thailand) Peangtarn Plipuech (Uzbekistan) Sabina Sharipova (Russia) Victoria Kan
December 14	Victoria Park, Hong Kong; Hard $10,000; Singles and doubles draws	(Japan) Haruka Kaji; 6–1, 3–6, 2–2, ret.	(United States) Tori Kinard	(Japan) Mana Ayukawa (China) Gai Ao	(China) Guo Hanyu (Russia) Angelina Zhuravleva (China) Wei Zhanlan (China) Zhang Ying
December 14	Victoria Park, Hong Kong; Hard $10,000; Singles and doubles draws	(Finland) Emma Laine (Japan) Yukina Saigo; Walkover	(Japan) Mana Ayukawa (Japan) Haruka Kaji	(Japan) Mana Ayukawa (China) Gai Ao	(China) Guo Hanyu (Russia) Angelina Zhuravleva (China) Wei Zhanlan (China) Zhang Ying
December 14	Port El Kantaoui, Tunisia; Hard $10,000; Singles and doubles draws	(Russia) Marta Paigina; 6–2, 6–3	(Bulgaria) Isabella Shinikova	(Poland) Wiktoria Kulik (France) Clothilde de Bernardi	(United Kingdom) Mirabelle Njoze (United Kingdom) Francesca Stephenson (France) Audrey Albié (Moldova) Alexandra Perper
December 14	Port El Kantaoui, Tunisia; Hard $10,000; Singles and doubles draws	(Belarus) Darya Chernetsova (Moldova) Alexandra Perper; 6–4, 4–6, [10–7]	(Bulgaria) Isabella Shinikova (United Kingdom) Francesca Stephenson	(Poland) Wiktoria Kulik (France) Clothilde de Bernardi	(United Kingdom) Mirabelle Njoze (United Kingdom) Francesca Stephenson (France) Audrey Albié (Moldova) Alexandra Perper
December 21	NECC–ITF Women's Tennis Championships; Pune, India; Hard $25,000; Singles and doubles draws	(Belarus) Aryna Sabalenka; 6–3, 6–4	(Russia) Viktoria Kamenskaya	(Russia) Anna Morgina (Serbia) Nina Stojanović	(Spain) Georgina García Pérez (Austria) Barbara Haas (Montenegro) Ana Veselinović (Russia) Polina Leykina
December 21	NECC–ITF Women's Tennis Championships; Pune, India; Hard $25,000; Singles and doubles draws	(Russia) Valentyna Ivakhnenko (Ukraine) Anastasiya Vasylyeva; 4–6, 6–2, [12–10]	(Chinese Taipei) Hsu Chieh-yu (India) Prarthana Thombare	(Russia) Anna Morgina (Serbia) Nina Stojanović	(Spain) Georgina García Pérez (Austria) Barbara Haas (Montenegro) Ana Veselinović (Russia) Polina Leykina
December 21	Bangkok, Thailand; Hard $25,000; Singles and doubles draws	(South Korea) Han Na-lae; 6–2, 6–4	(Japan) Risa Ozaki	(China) Tian Ran (Estonia) Kaia Kanepi	(Russia) Irina Khromacheva (Uzbekistan) Sabina Sharipova (Japan) Hiroko Kuwata (China) Lu Jingjing
December 21	Bangkok, Thailand; Hard $25,000; Singles and doubles draws	(Russia) Irina Khromacheva (Russia) Valeria Solovyeva; 6–3, 4–6, [10–5]	(South Korea) Choi Ji-hee (Thailand) Peangtarn Plipuech	(China) Tian Ran (Estonia) Kaia Kanepi	(Russia) Irina Khromacheva (Uzbekistan) Sabina Sharipova (Japan) Hiroko Kuwata (China) Lu Jingjing
December 21	Victoria Park, Hong Kong; Hard $10,000; Singles and doubles draws	(Finland) Emma Laine; 6–1, 6–3	(Japan) Chihiro Muramatsu	(China) Wang Yan (China) Jiang Xinyu	(Germany) Vivian Wolff (Russia) Angelina Zhuravleva (China) Sheng Yuqi (China) Wei Zhanlan
December 21	Victoria Park, Hong Kong; Hard $10,000; Singles and doubles draws	(Finland) Emma Laine (Japan) Yukina Saigo; 6–1, 6–1	(China) Jiang Xinyu (China) Li Yihong	(China) Wang Yan (China) Jiang Xinyu	(Germany) Vivian Wolff (Russia) Angelina Zhuravleva (China) Sheng Yuqi (China) Wei Zhanlan
December 21	Antalya, Turkey; Clay $10,000; Singles and doubles draws	(Georgia (country)) Ekaterine Gorgodze; 6–4, 6–2	(Turkey) Ayla Aksu	(France) Lou Brouleau (Belgium) Déborah Kerfs	(Switzerland) Karin Kennel (Bulgaria) Julia Stamatova (Russia) Aminat Kushkhova (Georgia (country)) Sofia Kvatsabaia
December 21	Antalya, Turkey; Clay $10,000; Singles and doubles draws	(Russia) Aminat Kushkhova (Bulgaria) Julia Stamatova; 7–5, 6–1	(Switzerland) Karin Kennel (Slovenia) Nastja Kolar	(France) Lou Brouleau (Belgium) Déborah Kerfs	(Switzerland) Karin Kennel (Bulgaria) Julia Stamatova (Russia) Aminat Kushkhova (Georgia (country)) Sofia Kvatsabaia
