= 2015 Engie Open Nantes Atlantique – Doubles =

Doubles
- 2015 Engie Open Nantes Atlantique

Final
- Champions: (Czech Republic) Lenka Kunčíková (Czech Republic) Karolína Stuchlá
- Runners-up: (Czech Republic) Kateřina Siniaková (Czech Republic) Renata Voráčová
- Score: 6–4, 6–2

Events
Singles	Doubles
← 2014 ·	Engie Open Nantes Atlantique	· 2016 →

Lyudmyla Kichenok and Nadiia Kichenok were the defending champions, but chose to participate at the WTA Elite Trophy instead.

Lenka Kunčíková and Karolína Stuchlá won the title, defeating Kateřina Siniaková and Renata Voráčová in an all-Czech final, 6–4, 6–2.

== Seeds ==
1. (Czech Republic) Kateřina Siniaková / (Czech Republic) Renata Voráčová (final)
2. (Georgia (country)) Sofia Shapatava / (Ukraine) Anastasiya Vasylyeva (quarterfinals)
3. (Switzerland) Xenia Knoll / (Romania) Andreea Mitu (first round)
4. (France) Stéphanie Foretz / (France) Irina Ramialison (quarterfinals)

== Draw ==
=== Key ===
- Q = Qualifier
- WC = Wild card
- LL = Lucky loser
- Alt = Alternate
- SE = Special exempt
- PR = Protected ranking
- ITF = ITF entry
- JE = Junior exempt
- w/o = Walkover
- r = Retired
- d = Defaulted
- SR = Special ranking

First round
(Uzbekistan) N Abduraimova (Ukraine) A Kalinina	6	4	[7]
(France) M Georges (France) H Tan	3	6	[10]
3	(Switzerland) X Knoll (Romania) A Mitu	7^{7}	4	[4]
(Germany) A-L Friedsam (Russia) P Leykina	6^{2}	6	[10]
(Italy) C Giovine (Germany) T Korpatsch	6	1	[12]
(Argentina) T Búa (Turkey) B Eraydın	1	6	[10]
(Czech Republic) L Kunčíková (Czech Republic) K Stuchlá	5	6	[10]
(United States) L Chirico (Austria) T Paszek	7	3	[5]
(France) C Paquet (Turkey) İ Soylu	6	3	[11]
4	(France) S Foretz (France) I Ramialison	4	6	[13]
(Georgia (country)) O Kalashnikova (Latvia) A Sevastova	7^{7}	5	[4]
(Russia) P Monova (Switzerland) J Teichmann	6^{3}	7	[10]

Quarterfinals
1	(Czech Republic) K Siniaková (Czech Republic) R Voráčová	6	6
(France) M Georges (France) H Tan	2	0
(Germany) A-L Friedsam (Russia) P Leykina	6	6
(Italy) C Giovine (Germany) T Korpatsch	3	4
(Czech Republic) L Kunčíková (Czech Republic) K Stuchlá	6	6
4	(France) S Foretz (France) I Ramialison	4	3
(Russia) P Monova (Switzerland) J Teichmann	6	6
2	(Georgia (country)) S Shapatava (Ukraine) A Vasylyeva	3	3

Semifinals
1	(Czech Republic) K Siniaková (Czech Republic) R Voráčová	3	6	[11]
(Germany) A-L Friedsam (Russia) P Leykina	6	4	[9]
(Czech Republic) L Kunčíková (Czech Republic) K Stuchlá	7	6
(Russia) P Monova (Switzerland) J Teichmann	5	1

Final
1	(Czech Republic) K Siniaková (Czech Republic) R Voráčová	4	2
(Czech Republic) L Kunčíková (Czech Republic) K Stuchlá	6	6
