= 2015 Engie Open Nantes Atlantique =

- Date: 2–8 November
- Edition: 13th
- Category: ITF Women's Circuit
- Prize money: $50,000
- Surface: Hard / Indoor
- Location: Nantes, France

Champions

Singles
- (France) Mathilde Johansson

Doubles
- (Czech Republic) Lenka Kunčíková / (Czech Republic) Karolína Stuchlá
← 2014 ·	Engie Open Nantes Atlantique	· 2016 →

The 2015 Engie Open Nantes Atlantique was a professional tennis tournament played on indoor hard courts. It was the thirteenth edition of the tournament and part of the 2015 ITF Women's Circuit, offering a total of $50,000 in prize money. It took place in Nantes, France, on 2–8 November 2015.

== Singles main draw entrants ==
=== Seeds ===
Country	Player	Rank^{1}	Seed
GER	Anna-Lena Friedsam	93	1
CZE	Kateřina Siniaková	97	2
ROU	Andreea Mitu	99	3
LAT	Anastasija Sevastova	112	4
CZE	Kristýna Plíšková	115	5
USA	Louisa Chirico	123	6
FRA	Pauline Parmentier	133	7
RUS	Alexandra Panova	134	8

- ^{1} Rankings as of 26 October 2015

=== Other entrants ===
The following players received wildcards into the singles main draw:

- (France) Tessah Andrianjafitrimo
- (France) Fiona Ferro
- (France) Jessika Ponchet
- (France) Irina Ramialison

The following players received entry from the qualifying draw:

- (Switzerland) Xenia Knoll
- (France) Chloé Paquet
- (Georgia (country)) Sofia Shapatava
- (Czech Republic) Karolína Stuchlá

The following player received entry by a lucky loser spot:

- (France) Claire Feuerstein

The following player received entry by a junior exempt:

- (Switzerland) Jil Teichmann

== Champions ==
=== Singles ===
- (France) Mathilde Johansson def. (Romania) Andreea Mitu, 6–3, 6–4

=== Doubles ===
- (Czech Republic) Lenka Kunčíková / (Czech Republic) Karolína Stuchlá def. (Czech Republic) Kateřina Siniaková / (Czech Republic) Renata Voráčová, 6–4, 6–2
