= 2015 Engie Open Nantes Atlantique – Singles =

Singles
- 2015 Engie Open Nantes Atlantique

Final
- Champion: (France) Mathilde Johansson
- Runner-up: (Romania) Andreea Mitu
- Score: 6–3, 6–4

Events
Singles	Doubles
← 2014 ·	Engie Open Nantes Atlantique	· 2016 →

Kateřina Siniaková was the defending champion, but lost to Mathilde Johansson in the semifinals.

Johansson won the title, defeating Andreea Mitu in the final, 6–3, 6–4.

== Seeds ==
1. (Germany) Anna-Lena Friedsam (quarterfinals)
2. (Czech Republic) Kateřina Siniaková (semifinals)
3. (Romania) Andreea Mitu (final)
4. (Latvia) Anastasija Sevastova (second round)
5. (Czech Republic) Kristýna Plíšková (first round)
6. (United States) Louisa Chirico (semifinals)
7. (France) Pauline Parmentier (second round)
8. (Russia) Alexandra Panova (first round)

== Main draw ==
=== Key ===
- Q = Qualifier
- WC = Wild card
- LL = Lucky loser
- Alt = Alternate
- ITF = ITF entry
- PR = Protected ranking
- SR = Special ranking
- SE = Special exempt
- JE = Junior exempt
- JR = Junior Accelerator Programme entrant
- CO = College Accelerator Programme entrant
- NG = Next Gen Accelerator Program entrant
- w/o = Walkover
- r = Retired
- d = Defaulted

=== Finals ===
Semifinals
6	(United States) Louisa Chirico	6	0	4
3	(Romania) Andreea Mitu	2	6	6
(France) Mathilde Johansson	6	4	6
2	(Czech Republic) Kateřina Siniaková	4	6	2

Final
3	(Romania) Andreea Mitu	3	4
(France) Mathilde Johansson	6	6

=== Top half ===
First round
1	(Germany) A-L Friedsam	7	6
(Turkey) İ Soylu	5	4
WC	(France) F Ferro	5	4
Q	(Georgia (country)) S Shapatava	7	6
WC	(France) T Andrianjafitrimo	5	7^{7}	6
JE	(Switzerland) J Teichmann	7	6^{4}	2
LL	(France) C Feuerstein	1	3
6	(United States) L Chirico	6	6
3	(Romania) A Mitu	6	6
(France) O Dodin	3	2
(Croatia) A Vrljić	6	6
WC	(France) I Ramialison	4	4
(Austria) T Paszek	6	6
Q	(Czech Republic) K Stuchlá	4	3
(France) M Georges	6^{6}	6	6
8	(Russia) A Panova	7^{8}	1	1

Second round
1	(Germany) A-L Friedsam	6	6
Q	(Georgia (country)) S Shapatava	4	3
WC	(France) T Andrianjafitrimo	2	3
6	(United States) L Chirico	6	6
3	(Romania) A Mitu	6	6
(Croatia) A Vrljić	3	4
(Austria) T Paszek	6	6
(France) M Georges	4	2

Quarterfinals
1	(Germany) A-L Friedsam	6	3	2
6	(United States) L Chirico	2	6	6
3	(Romania) A Mitu	6	7^{13}
(Austria) T Paszek	2	6^{11}

Semifinals
6	(United States) L Chirico	6	0	4
3	(Romania) A Mitu	2	6	6

=== Bottom half ===
First round
7	(France) P Parmentier	6	1	6
(France) S Foretz	1	6	2
(France) M Johansson	7^{7}	6
(Uzbekistan) N Abduraimova	6^{5}	1
(Spain) S Soler Espinosa	0	3
(Ukraine) A Kalinina	6	6
(Czech Republic) R Voráčová	2	3
4	(Latvia) A Sevastova	6	6
5	(Czech Republic) Kr Plíšková	4	5
(Ukraine) Y Beygelzimer	6	7
Q	(Switzerland) X Knoll	6	6
Q	(France) C Paquet	4	3
WC	(France) J Ponchet	1	1
(Czech Republic) T Martincová	6	6
(Russia) P Leykina	6^{5}	1
2	(Czech Republic) K Siniaková	7^{7}	6

Second round
7	(France) P Parmentier	2	4
(France) M Johansson	6	6
(Ukraine) A Kalinina	6	6
4	(Latvia) A Sevastova	4	2
(Ukraine) Y Beygelzimer	5	2
Q	(Switzerland) X Knoll	7	6
(Czech Republic) T Martincová	5	6	6^{8}
2	(Czech Republic) K Siniaková	7	4	7^{10}

Quarterfinals
(France) M Johansson	6	7^{7}
(Ukraine) A Kalinina	1	6^{3}
Q	(Switzerland) X Knoll	6^{6}	4
2	(Czech Republic) K Siniaková	7^{8}	6

Semifinals
(France) M Johansson	6	4	6
2	(Czech Republic) K Siniaková	4	6	2
