= Adrijana Lekaj =

Kosovan tennis player

- Country (sports): Croatia (WTA); Kosovo (ITF and Billie Jean King Cup)
- Born: 29 June 1995 (age 31) Karlovac, Croatia
- Height: 1.70 m (5 ft 7 in)
- Plays: Right-handed (two-handed backhand)
- College: Pepperdine University
- Prize money: $33,398

Singles
- Career record: 123–78
- Career titles: 2 ITF
- Highest ranking: No. 325 (15 June 2015)

Doubles
- Career record: 60–38
- Career titles: 8 ITF
- Highest ranking: No. 321 (10 August 2015)

Adrijana Lekaj (born 29 June 1995) is a Kosovan-Croatian former tennis player.

Over her career, Lekaj won two singles titles and eight doubles titles on the ITF Circuit. She has career-high WTA rankings of 325 in singles, achieved on 15 June 2015, and 321 in doubles, set on 10 August 2015.

Lekaj has represented Kosovo in Fed Cup competitions, making her debut in 2021 and reaching a win–loss record of 11–18.

== ITF finals ==
=== Singles: 6 (2 titles, 4 runner-ups) ===
Legend $50,000 tournaments $25,000 tournaments $10,000 tournaments	Finals by surface Hard (1–0) Clay (1–3) Carpet (0–1)

Result	W–L	Date	Tournament	Tier	Surface	Opponent	Score
Win	1–0	Mar 2013	ITF Sharm El Sheikh, Egypt	10,000	Hard	(Argentina) Vanesa Furlanetto	4–6, 7–6^{(8)}, 6–1
Win	2–0	Jul 2013	ITF Bad Waltersdorf, Austria	10,000	Clay	(Austria) Yvonne Neuwirth	6–2, 6–4
Loss	2–1	Nov 2013	ITF Umag, Croatia	10,000	Clay	(Hungary) Ágnes Bukta	0–6, 1–6
Loss	2–2	May 2014	ITF Bol, Croatia	10,000	Clay	(Switzerland) Lara Michel	3–6, 3–6
Loss	2–3	Jun 2014	ITF Budapest, Hungary	25,000	Clay	(Czech Republic) Denisa Allertová	6–7^{(6)}, 6–7^{(3)}
Loss	2–4	Nov 2015	Ismaning Open, Germany	10,000	Carpet (i)	(Romania) Laura Ioana Andrei	2–6, 2–6

=== Doubles: 13 (8 titles, 5 runner-ups) ===
Legend $15,000 tournaments $10,000 tournaments	Finals by surface Hard (2–2) Clay (6–3)

Result	W–L	Date	Tournament	Tier	Surface	Partner	Opponents	Score
Loss	0–1	Jul 2013	ITF Bad Waltersdorf, Austria	10,000	Clay	(Croatia) Karla Popović	(Czech Republic) Lenka Kunčíková (Czech Republic) Karolína Stuchlá	4–6, 6–7^{(6)}
Win	1–1	Sep 2013	ITF Lleida, Spain	10,000	Clay	(Russia) Alena Tarasova	(Argentina) Tatiana Búa (Spain) Lucía Cervera Vázquez	6–3, 6–4
Win	2–1	Jun 2014	ITF Budapest, Hungary	10,000	Clay	(Argentina) Sofía Blanco	(Slovakia) Zuzana Luknárová (Russia) Eugeniya Pashkova	7–6^{(5)}, 6–3
Win	3–1	Aug 2014	ITF Vinkovci, Croatia	10,000	Clay	(Croatia) Jana Fett	(Hungary) Lilla Barzó (Hungary) Ágnes Bukta	6–3, 7–5
Win	4–1	Aug 2014	ITF Pörtschach, Austria	10,000	Clay	(Croatia) Silvia Njirić	(Slovakia) Zuzana Luknárová (Slovakia) Karin Morgošová	6–1, 6–7^{(5)}, [10–4]
Win	5–1	Dec 2014	ITF Istanbul, Turkey	10,000	Hard	(Croatia) Jana Fett	(Turkey) Ayla Aksu (Turkey) İpek Soylu	6–3, 6–4
Loss	5–2	Mar 2015	ITF Oslo, Norway	10,000	Hard (i)	(Croatia) Jana Fett	(Poland) Justyna Jegiołka (Netherlands) Eva Wacanno	1–6, 1–6
Win	6–2	Sep 2015	ITF Bol, Croatia	10,000	Clay	(Croatia) Silvia Njirić	(Hungary) Anna Bondár (Hungary) Rebeka Stolmár	6–4, 7–5
Win	7–2	Dec 2015	ITF Ortisei, Italy	10,000	Hard (i)	(Italy) Deborah Chiesa	(Switzerland) Chiara Grimm (Switzerland) Nina Stadler	6–1, 6–3
Loss	7–3	Feb 2016	ITF Antalya, Turkey	10,000	Clay	(Bulgaria) Viktoriya Tomova	(United States) Dasha Ivanova (Romania) Elena-Gabriela Ruse	6–7^{(1)}, 1–6
Loss	7–4	Apr 2016	ITF Heraklion, Greece	10,000	Hard	(Italy) Deborah Chiesa	(Russia) Aleksandra Pospelova (Russia) Alina Silich	3–6, 4–6
Loss	7–5	May 2016	ITF Tučepi, Croatia	10,000	Clay	(Finland) Emma Laine	(United States) Dasha Ivanova (Czech Republic) Petra Krejsová	3–6, 6–2, [5–10]
Win	8–5	Jun 2018	Maribor Open, Slovenia	15,000	Clay	(Czech Republic) Michaela Bayerlová	(France) Irina Ramialison (France) Constance Sibille	7–6^{(2)}, 7–5
