= Ema Burgić =

Bosnian tennis player

- Country (sports): Bosnia and Herzegovina (2007–2024; March 2025-); United States (May 2024-March 2025)
- Born: 22 August 1992 (age 34) Lukavac, Bosnia and Herzeg.
- Height: 1.78 m (5 ft 10 in)
- Plays: Right (two-handed backhand)
- Prize money: $69,425

Singles
- Career record: 195–130
- Career titles: 4 ITF
- Highest ranking: No. 466 (3 October 2016)
- Current ranking: No. 679 (28 September 2026)

Doubles
- Career record: 119–69
- Career titles: 14 ITF
- Highest ranking: No. 145 (17 October 2016)
- Current ranking: No. 524 (28 September 2026)

Team competitions
- Fed Cup: 11–11
- Last updated on: 29 September 2026.

Ema Burgić (born 22 August 1992) is a Bosnian professional tennis player.

In her career, she won four singles and 14 doubles titles on the ITF World Tennis Tour. On 3 October 2016, she reached her best singles ranking of world No. 466. On 17 October 2016, she peaked at No. 145 in the WTA doubles rankings.

Playing for Bosnia and Herzegovina, Burgić has a win–loss record of 11–11 in BJK Cup.

She won her first tournament on the ITF Circuit in 2008 as a 16-year-old, at a $10k event in La Vall d'Uixó, Spain.

In June 2015, she married fellow tennis player Attila Bucko. The couple divorced in 2023. Ema Burgić returned to professional tennis in 2024, and became a United States citizen in May of that year.

== ITF Circuit finals ==
=== Singles: 8 (4 titles, 4 runner-ups) ===
Legend W35 tournaments W10 tournaments	Finals by surface Hard (2–2) Clay (2–2)

Result	W–L	Date	Tournament	Tier	Surface	Opponent	Score
Win	1–0	Nov 2008	ITF La Vall d'Uixó, Spain	W10	Clay	(Spain) Leticia Costas	6–2, 6–1
Loss	1–1	Dec 2009	ITF Vinaròs, Spain	W10	Clay	(Spain) Garbiñe Muguruza	2–6, 0–3 ret.
Loss	1–2	Apr 2010	ITF Hvar, Croatia	W10	Clay	(Romania) Mădălina Gojnea	4–6, 4–6
Win	2–2	Apr 2011	ITF Hvar, Croatia	W10	Clay	(Croatia) Donna Vekić	7–5, 7–6^{(2)}
Loss	2–3	Jul 2013	ITF Austin, United States	W10	Hard	(United States) Lauren Albanese	5–7, 7–5, 6–7^{(4)}
Loss	2–4	Nov 2015	ITF Port El Kantaoui, Tunisia	W10	Hard	(Bosnia and Herzegovina) Jelena Simić	6–3, 1–6, 4–6
Win	3–4	Nov 2015	ITF Port El Kantaoui, Tunisia	W10	Hard	(Russia) Anna Kalinskaya	w/o
Win	4–4	Jun 2025	ITF Santo Domingo, Dominican Republic	W35	Hard	(Poland) Zuzanna Pawlikowska	6–2, 5–7, 6–2

=== Doubles: 20 (14 titles, 6 runner-ups) ===
Legend W100 tournaments W50 tournaments W25/35 tournaments W10/15 tournaments	Finals by surface Hard (7–3) Clay (7–3)

Result	W–L	Date	Tournament	Tier	Surface	Partner	Opponents	Score
Loss	0–1	Jun 2008	ITF Sarajevo, Bosnia & Herzegovina	W10	Clay	(Serbia) Karolina Jovanović	(Italy) Martina Caciotti (Slovenia) Mika Urbančič	4–6, 3–6
Win	1–1	Sep 2010	ITF Brčko, Bosnia & Herzeg.	W10	Clay	(Bosnia and Herzegovina) Jasmina Kajtazovič	(Romania) Patricia Chirea (Russia) Margarita Lazareva	6–3, 6–3
Win	2–1	Jul 2013	ITF Austin, United States	W10	Hard	(United States) Blair Shankle	(United States) Rachel May Pierson (United States) Madison Westby	6–1, 7–6^{(5)}
Win	3–1	Aug 2014	ITF Brčko, Bosnia & Herzeg.	W10	Clay	(Bosnia and Herzegovina) Anita Husarić	(Germany) Ina Kaufinger (Czech Republic) Natálie Novotná	6–1, 6–4
Win	4–1	Oct 2015	ITF Rock Hill, United States	W25	Hard	(Mexico) Renata Zarazúa	(Bulgaria) Elitsa Kostova (Argentina) Florencia Molinero	7–5, 6–2
Win	5–1	Oct 2015	ITF Florence, United States	W25	Hard	(United States) Keri Wong	(Latvia) Diāna Marcinkēviča (United States) Chiara Scholl	7–6^{(6)}, 6–1
Win	6–1	Nov 2015	ITF Port El Kantaoui, Tunisia	W10	Hard	(Bosnia and Herzegovina) Jelena Simić	(United Kingdom) Mirabelle Njoze (United States) Miranda Ramirez	7–6^{(4)}, 6–4
Loss	6–2	Mar 2016	ITF Orlando, United States	W10	Clay	(Bulgaria) Dia Evtimova	(Norway) Ulrikke Eikeri (Netherlands) Quirine Lemoine	1–6, 3–6
Win	7–2	Jul 2016	Budapest Open, Hungary	W100	Clay	(Spain) Georgina García Pérez	(Czech Republic) Lenka Kunčíková (Czech Republic) Karolína Stuchlá	6–4, 2–6, [12–10]
Win	8–2	Jul 2016	ITS Cup, Czech Republic	W50	Clay	(Bosnia and Herzegovina) Jasmina Tinjić	(Philippines) Katharina Lehnert (Ukraine) Anastasiya Shoshyna	7–5, 6–3
Loss	8–3	Aug 2016	ITF Plzeň, Czech Republic	W25	Clay	(Spain) Georgina García Pérez	(Poland) Katarzyna Kawa (Sweden) Cornelia Lister	1–6, 6–7^{(6)}
Loss	8–4	Sep 2016	ITF Lubbock, United States	W25	Hard	(Mexico) Renata Zarazúa	(United States) Emina Bektas (United States) Catherine Harrison	3–6, 4–6
Win	9–4	Oct 2016	ITF Redding, United States	W25	Hard	(United States) Sabrina Santamaria	(United States) Julia Elbaba (United States) Bernarda Pera	6–3, 7–6^{(4)}
Win	10–4	Dec 2016	ITF Antalya, Turkey	W10	Clay	(Norway) Ulrikke Eikeri	(Ukraine) Maryna Chernyshova (Russia) Anna Ukolova	6–4, 6–1
Win	11–4	Dec 2016	ITF Antalya, Turkey	W10	Clay	(Norway) Ulrikke Eikeri	(Poland) Sonia Grzywocz (United States) Caitlyn Williams	6–1, 6–1
Loss	11–5	Sep 2024	Berkeley Tennis Challenge, US	W35	Hard	(India) Rutuja Bhosale	(Australia) Elysia Bolton (United States) Maegan Manasse	7–6^{(3)}, 2–6, [6–10]
Win	12–5	Oct 2024	ITF Huamantla, Mexico	W15	Hard	(United States) Sabastiani León	(Mexico) Claudia Sofía Martínez (Mexico) Fernanda Navarro	3–6, 6–2, [10–6]
Win	13–5	Apr 2025	ITF Charlotte, US	W35	Clay	(Japan) Haruna Arakawa	(Mexico) María Portillo Ramírez (Mexico) Victoria Rodríguez	6–2, 7–5
Win	14–5	Oct 2025	ITF Bakersfield, US	W35	Hard	(Ukraine) Anita Sahdiieva	(Italy) Francesca Pace (Poland) Zuzanna Pawlikowska	5–7, 6–1, [10–7]
Loss	14–6	Oct 2026	ITF Bakersfield, US	W35	Hard	(Romania) Briana Szabó	(Australia) Lily Fairclough (United States) Anne Christine Lütkemeyer	2–6, 3–6
