= Lenka Kunčíková =

Czech tennis player

Lenka Jará (Kunčíková)
- Country (sports): Czech Republic
- Residence: Prague
- Born: 29 July 1995 (age 30) Nový Jičín
- Height: 1.75 m (5 ft 9 in)
- Plays: Right (two-handed backhand)
- Prize money: $47,244

Singles
- Career record: 62–63
- Career titles: 1 ITF
- Highest ranking: No. 588 (10 August 2015)

Doubles
- Career record: 118–79
- Career titles: 13 ITF
- Highest ranking: No. 97 (12 September 2016)

Lenka Kunčíková (born 29 July 1995) is a Czech former tennis player.

On 10 August 2015, she reached a career-high singles ranking of world No. 588. On 12 September 2016, she peaked at No. 97 in the WTA doubles rankings. In her career, she won one singles title and 13 doubles titles on the ITF Women's Circuit.

Kunčíková made her WTA Tour main-draw debut at the 2015 Nürnberger Versicherungscup, in the doubles draw, partnering Karolína Stuchlá.

== ITF finals ==
=== Singles (1–1) ===
Legend $50,000 tournaments $25,000 tournaments $10,000 tournaments	Finals by surface Hard (0–0) Clay (1–1)

Outcome	No.	Date	Tournament	Surface	Opponent	Score
Runner-up	1.	29 August 2014	ITF Ostrava, Czech Republic	Clay	(Croatia) Jana Fett	4–6, 3–6
Winner	1.	20 September 2014	ITF Hluboká nad Vltavou, Czech Republic	Clay	(Czech Republic) Jesika Malečková	6–4, 6–3

=== Doubles (13–9) ===
Legend $100,000 tournaments $50,000 tournaments $25,000 tournaments $10/15,000 tournaments	Finals by surface Hard (4–2) Clay (9–7)

Outcome	No.	Date	Tournament	Surface	Partner	Opponents	Score
Runner-up	1.	17 August 2012	ITF Innsbruck, Austria	Clay	(Czech Republic) Klára Dohnalová	(Bosnia and Herzegovina) Jasmina Kajtazovič (Slovenia) Polona Reberšak	5–7, 6–2, [18–20]
Winner	1.	26 July 2013	ITF Bad Waltersdorf, Austria	Clay	(Czech Republic) Karolína Stuchlá	(Croatia) Adrijana Lekaj (Croatia) Karla Popovic	6–4, 7–6^{(6)}
Winner	2.	23 August 2013	ITF Prague, Czech Republic	Clay	(Czech Republic) Karolína Stuchlá	(Czech Republic) Kristyna Hrabalova (Czech Republic) Marie Mayerova	6–3, 7–5
Runner-up	2.	7 September 2013	ITF Berlin, Germany	Clay	(Czech Republic) Karolína Stuchlá	(Belgium) Ysaline Bonaventure (Sweden) Cornelia Lister	4–6, 6–3, [5–10]
Winner	3.	23 May 2014	ITF Velenje, Slovenia	Clay	(Czech Republic) Karolína Stuchlá	(Czech Republic) Martina Kubicikova (Czech Republic) Tereza Malikova	7–5, 6–1
Runner-up	3.	26 May 2014	ITF Bol, Croatia	Clay	(Czech Republic) Karolína Stuchlá	(Peru) Bianca Botto (Finland) Emma Laine	3–6, 3–6
Winner	4.	30 May 2014	ITF Bol, Croatia	Clay	(Czech Republic) Karolína Stuchlá	(Ukraine) Olga Ianchuk (Germany) Christina Shakovets	0–6, 6–1, [10–8]
Winner	5.	6 June 2014	ITF Bol, Croatia	Clay	(Czech Republic) Karolína Stuchlá	(Australia) Samantha Harris (Australia) Sally Peers	6–0, 6–4
Winner	6.	30 August 2014	ITF Ostrava, Czech Republic	Clay	(Czech Republic) Karolína Stuchlá	(Ukraine) Maryna Kolb (Ukraine) Nadiya Kolb	4–6, 6–2, [10–7]
Runner-up	4.	6 September 2014	ITF Prague, Czech Republic	Clay	(Czech Republic) Karolína Stuchlá	(Czech Republic) Petra Krejsová (Slovakia) Zuzana Luknárová	6–4, 3–6, [6–10]
Winner	7.	10 October 2014	ITF Albena, Bulgaria	Clay	(Czech Republic) Karolína Stuchlá	(Moldova) Julia Helbet (Bulgaria) Isabella Shinikova	6–2, 6–4
Winner	8.	17 January 2015	ITF Stuttgart, Germany	Hard (i)	(Czech Republic) Karolína Stuchlá	(Czech Republic) Martina Borecka (Czech Republic) Jesika Malečková	6–2, 6–3
Runner-up	5.	4 July 2015	ITF Stuttgart, Germany	Clay	(Czech Republic) Karolína Stuchlá	(Russia) Maria Marfutina (Belarus) Iryna Shymanovich	2–6, 6–4, [8–10]
Winner	9.	18 July 2015	ITS Cup, Czech Republic	Clay	(Czech Republic) Karolína Stuchlá	(Netherlands) Cindy Burger (Czech Republic) Kateřina Vaňková	1–6, 6–4, [12–10]
Runner-up	6.	8 August 2015	ITF Plzeň, Czech Republic	Clay	(Czech Republic) Karolína Stuchlá	(Czech Republic) Barbora Krejčíková (Sweden) Rebecca Peterson	4–6, 3–6
Winner	10.	19 September 2015	ITF Bol, Croatia	Clay	(Germany) Julia Wachaczyk	(Switzerland) Karin Kennel (Croatia) Iva Primorac	6–3, 4–6, [10–6]
Runner-up	7.	10 October 2015	ITF Sozopol, Bulgaria	Clay	(Czech Republic) Karolína Stuchlá	(Germany) Vivian Heisen (Bulgaria) Julia Terziyska	3–6, 1–6
Winner	11.	16 October 2015	ITF Albena, Bulgaria	Clay	(Czech Republic) Karolína Stuchlá	(Czech Republic) Gabriela Pantůčková (Czech Republic) Magdaléna Pantůčková	6–1, 6–3
Winner	12.	8 November 2015	Open Nantes Atlantique, France	Hard (i)	(Czech Republic) Karolína Stuchlá	(Czech Republic) Kateřina Siniaková (Czech Republic) Renata Voráčová	6–4, 6–2
Winner	13.	31 January 2016	ITF Sunrise, United States	Clay	(Czech Republic) Karolína Stuchlá	(Czech Republic) Kateřina Kramperová (Czech Republic) Jesika Malečková	6–1, 7–6^{(6)}
Runner-up	8.	2 April 2016	Open de Seine-et-Marne, France	Hard (i)	(Czech Republic) Karolína Stuchlá	(United Kingdom) Jocelyn Rae (United Kingdom) Anna Smith	4–6, 1–6
Runner-up	9.	8 July 2016	Budapest Ladies Open, Hungary	Clay	(Czech Republic) Karolína Stuchlá	(Bosnia and Herzegovina) Ema Burgić (Spain) Georgina García Pérez	4–6, 6–2, [10–12]
