= Karolína Stuchlá =

Czech tennis player

- Country (sports): Czech Republic
- Residence: Děčín, Czech Republic
- Born: 24 February 1994 (age 32) Děčín
- Height: 1.84 m (6 ft 0 in)
- Plays: Right-handed (two-handed backhand)
- Prize money: $37,378

Singles
- Career record: 88–58
- Career titles: 0
- Highest ranking: No. 669 (23 February 2015)

Doubles
- Career record: 118–64
- Career titles: 13 ITF
- Highest ranking: No. 97 (12 September 2016)

Karolína Stuchlá (born 24 February 1994) is a Czech former professional tennis player.

On 12 September 2016, she reached her highest doubles rankings of world No. 97. In her career, she won 13 doubles titles on the ITF Women's Circuit.

Stuchlá made her WTA Tour main-draw debut at the 2015 Nürnberger Versicherungscup in the doubles draw, partnering Lenka Kunčíková. She played her last match on the pro circuit in February 2017.

== ITF Circuit finals ==
=== Singles: 1 (runner-up) ===
Result	Date	Tournament	Surface	Opponent	Score
Loss	6 October 2014	ITF Albena, Bulgaria	Clay	(Czech Republic) Pernilla Mendesová	5–7, 2–6

=== Doubles: 24 (13 titles, 11 runner-ups) ===
Legend $100,000 tournaments $50,000 tournaments $25,000 tournaments $15,000 tournaments $10,000 tournaments	Finals by surface Hard (2–2) Clay (11–9) Grass (0–0) Carpet (0–0)

Result	No.	Date	Tournament	Surface	Partner	Opponents	Score
Win	1.	22 July 2013	ITF Bad Waltersdorf, Austria	Clay	(Czech Republic) Lenka Kunčíková	(Croatia) Adrijana Lekaj (Croatia) Karla Popovic	6–4, 7–6^{(6)}
Win	2.	19 August 2013	ITF Prague, Czech Republic	Clay	(Czech Republic) Lenka Kunčíková	(Czech Republic) Kristyna Hrabalova (Czech Republic) Marie Mayerová	6–3, 7–5
Loss	1.	2 September 2013	ITF Berlin, Germany	Clay	(Czech Republic) Lenka Kunčíková	(Belgium) Ysaline Bonaventure (Sweden) Cornelia Lister	4–6, 6–3, [5–10]
Win	3.	16 March 2014	ITF Gonesse, France	Clay (i)	(France) Jessika Ponchet	(Germany) Carolin Daniels (Germany) Lena-Marie Hofmann	6–7^{(4)}, 6–3 [10–3]
Loss	2.	4 April 2014	ITF Šibenik, Croatia	Clay	(Czech Republic) Eva Rutarová	(Hungary) Ágnes Bukta (Bulgaria) Viktoriya Tomova	6–7^{(12)}, 1–6
Loss	3.	12 April 2014	ITF Bol, Croatia	Clay	(France) Carla Touly	(Hungary) Ágnes Bukta (Bulgaria) Viktoriya Tomova	2–6, 1–6
Win	4.	19 May 2014	ITF Velenje, Slovenia	Clay	(Czech Republic) Lenka Kunčíková	(Czech Republic) Martina Kubicikova (Czech Republic) Tereza Maliková	7–5, 6–1
Loss	4.	26 May 2014	ITF Bol, Croatia	Clay	(Czech Republic) Lenka Kunčíková	(Peru) Bianca Botto (Finland) Emma Laine	3–6, 3–6
Win	5.	2 June 2014	ITF Bol, Croatia	Clay	(Czech Republic) Lenka Kunčíková	(Ukraine) Olga Ianchuk (Germany) Christina Shakovets	0–6, 6–1, [10–8]
Win	6.	9 June 2014	ITF Bol, Croatia	Clay	(Czech Republic) Lenka Kunčíková	(Australia) Samantha Harris (Australia) Sally Peers	6–0, 6–4
Loss	5.	16 June 2014	ITF Přerov, Czech Republic	Clay	(Czech Republic) Eva Rutarová	(Slovakia) Chantal Škamlová (Czech Republic) Barbora Štefková	4–6, 3–6
Win	7.	25 August 2014	ITF Ostrava, Czech Republic	Clay	(Czech Republic) Lenka Kunčíková	(Ukraine) Maryna Kolb (Ukraine) Nadiya Kolb	4–6, 6–2, [10–7]
Loss	6.	1 September 2014	ITF Prague, Czech Republic	Clay	(Czech Republic) Lenka Kunčíková	(Czech Republic) Petra Krejsová (Slovakia) Zuzana Luknárová	6–4, 3–6, [6–10]
Win	8.	10 October 2014	ITF Albena, Bulgaria	Clay	(Czech Republic) Lenka Kunčíková	(Moldova) Julia Helbet (Bulgaria) Isabella Shinikova	6–2, 6–4
Win	9.	12 January 2015	ITF Stuttgart, Germany	Hard (i)	(Czech Republic) Lenka Kunčíková	(Czech Republic) Martina Borecka (Czech Republic) Jesika Malečková	6–2, 6–3
Loss	7.	29 June 2015	ITF Stuttgart, Germany	Clay	(Czech Republic) Lenka Kunčíková	(Russia) Maria Marfutina (Belarus) Iryna Shymanovich	2–6, 6–4, [8–10]
Win	10.	13 July 2015	ITS Cup, Czech Republic	Clay	(Czech Republic) Lenka Kunčíková	(Netherlands) Cindy Burger (Czech Republic) Kateřina Vaňková	1–6, 6–4, [12–10]
Loss	8.	3 August 2015	ITF Plzeň, Czech Republic	Clay	(Czech Republic) Lenka Kunčíková	(Czech Republic) Barbora Krejčíková (Sweden) Rebecca Peterson	4–6, 3–6
Loss	9.	10 October 2015	ITF Sozopol, Bulgaria	Clay	(Czech Republic) Lenka Kunčíková	(Germany) Vivian Heisen (Bulgaria) Julia Terziyska	3–6, 1–6
Win	11.	17 October 2015	ITF Albena, Bulgaria	Clay	(Czech Republic) Lenka Kunčíková	(Czech Republic) Gabriela Pantůčková (Czech Republic) Magdaléna Pantůčková	6–1, 6–3
Win	12.	8 November 2015	Open Nantes Atlantique, France	Hard (i)	(Czech Republic) Lenka Kunčíková	(Czech Republic) Kateřina Siniaková (Czech Republic) Renata Voráčová	6–4, 6–2
Win	13.	31 January 2016	ITF Sunrise, United States	Clay	(Czech Republic) Lenka Kunčíková	(Czech Republic) Kateřina Kramperová (Czech Republic) Jesika Malečková	6–1, 7–6^{(6)}
Loss	10.	2 April 2016	ITF Croissy-Beaubourg, France	Hard (i)	(Czech Republic) Lenka Kunčíková	(United Kingdom) Jocelyn Rae (United Kingdom) Anna Smith	4–6, 1–6
Loss	11.	10 July 2016	Budapest Ladies Open, Hungary	Clay	(Czech Republic) Lenka Kunčíková	(Bosnia and Herzegovina) Ema Burgić Bucko (Spain) Georgina García Pérez	4–6, 6–2, [10–12]
