= 2012 Trofeul Popeci =

- Date: June 11 – June 17
- Edition: 6th
- Surface: Clay – Outdoor
- Location: Craiova, Romania

Champions

Singles
- (Spain) María-Teresa Torró-Flor

Doubles
- (Czech Republic) Renata Voráčová / (Slovakia) Lenka Wienerová
← 2011 ·	Trofeul Popeci	· 2013 →

The 2012 Trofeul Popeci was a professional tennis tournament played on outdoor clay courts. It was part of the 2012 ITF Women's Circuit. It took place in Craiova, Romania between 11 and 17 June 2012. This 6th edition of the Popeci Trophy saw its prize money rise from US$25,000 to US$50,000+H.

== WTA entrants ==
=== Seeds ===
Country	Player	Rank^{1}	Seed
BUL	Elitsa Kostova	154	1
ITA	Anna Floris	191	2
GER	Dinah Pfizenmaier	198	3
ROU	Elena Bogdan	203	4
SRB	Aleksandra Krunić	230	5
LTU	Lina Stančiūtė	239	6
ITA	Annalisa Bona	243	7
RUS	Irina Khromacheva	245	8

- Rankings are as of May 28, 2012.

=== Other entrants ===
The following players received wildcards into the singles main draw:

- (Romania) Camelia Hristea
- (Romania) Diana Marcu
- (Romania) Ioana Loredana Roșca
- (Romania) Ana Mihaela Vlăduțu

The following players received entry from the qualifying draw:

- (Romania) Cristina Adamescu
- (Croatia) Indire Akiki
- (Venezuela) Andrea Gámiz
- (Poland) Paula Kania

The following player received entry from a special exempt spot:

- (Spain) María-Teresa Torró-Flor

== Champions ==
=== Singles ===
- (Spain) María-Teresa Torró-Flor def. (Romania) Cristina Mitu, 6–3, 6–4

=== Doubles ===
- (Czech Republic) Renata Voráčová / (Slovakia) Lenka Wienerová def. (Poland) Paula Kania / (Russia) Irina Khromacheva, 2–6, 6–3, [10–6]
