= 2012 Trofeul Popeci – Doubles =

Doubles
- 2012 Trofeul Popeci

Final
- Champions: (Czech Republic) Renata Voráčová (Slovakia) Lenka Wienerová
- Runners-up: (Poland) Paula Kania (Russia) Irina Khromacheva
- Score: 2–6, 6–3, [10–6]

Events
Singles	Doubles
← 2011 ·	Trofeul Popeci	· 2013 →

Diana Enache and Daniëlle Harmsen were the defending champions, but lost in the quarterfinals to Paula Kania and Irina Khromacheva, 4–6, 5–7.

Renata Voráčová and Lenka Wienerová won the title, defeating Paula Kania and Irina Khromacheva in the final, 2–6, 6–3, [10–6].

== Seeds ==
1. (Romania) Elena Bogdan / (Romania) Raluca Olaru (quarterfinals)
2. (Czech Republic) Renata Voráčová / (Slovakia) Lenka Wienerová (champions)
3. (Argentina) Mailen Auroux / (Argentina) María Irigoyen (first round)
4. (Romania) Diana Enache / (Netherlands) Daniëlle Harmsen (quarterfinals)

== Draw ==
=== Key ===
- Q = Qualifier
- WC = Wild card
- LL = Lucky loser
- Alt = Alternate
- SE = Special exempt
- PR = Protected ranking
- ITF = ITF entry
- JE = Junior exempt
- w/o = Walkover
- r = Retired
- d = Defaulted
- SR = Special ranking

=== Draw ===
First round
1	(Romania) E Bogdan (Romania) R Olaru	3	6	[10]
WC	(Romania) I-A Iova (China) M Liu	6	3	[3]
(Slovakia) L Juríková (Slovakia) Z Luknárová	6	3	[7]
(Serbia) A Krunić (Croatia) A Vrljić	2	6	[10]
4	(Romania) D Enache (Netherlands) D Harmsen	6	6
(Turkey) H Esen (Turkey) L Esen	2	4
(Poland) P Kania (Russia) I Khromacheva	6	6
(Romania) C Dinu (Romania) C Mitu	4	3
WC	(Romania) RM Naicu (Romania) I Radu	1	0
(Lithuania) L Stančiūtė (Slovenia) M Zec-Peškirič	6	6
(Romania) LI Andrei (Romania) D Marcu	4	7	[10]
3	(Argentina) M Auroux (Argentina) M Irigoyen	6	5	[4]
WC	(Romania) C Hristea (Romania) A-A Radu	4	2
(Venezuela) A Gámiz (Mexico) X Hermoso	6	6
(Bulgaria) E Kostova (Romania) Á Szatmári	1	6	[6]
2	(Czech Republic) R Voráčová (Slovakia) L Wienerová	6	4	[10]

Quarterfinals
1	(Romania) E Bogdan (Romania) R Olaru	7	2	[6]
(Serbia) A Krunić (Croatia) A Vrljić	5	6	[10]
4	(Romania) D Enache (Netherlands) D Harmsen	4	5
(Poland) P Kania (Russia) I Khromacheva	6	7
(Lithuania) L Stančiūtė (Slovenia) M Zec-Peškirič	6	3	[7]
(Romania) LI Andrei (Romania) D Marcu	4	6	[10]
(Venezuela) A Gámiz (Mexico) X Hermoso	3	5
2	(Czech Republic) R Voráčová (Slovakia) L Wienerová	6	7

Semifinals
(Serbia) A Krunić (Croatia) A Vrljić	2	1
(Poland) P Kania (Russia) I Khromacheva	6	6
(Romania) LI Andrei (Romania) D Marcu	3	5
2	(Czech Republic) R Voráčová (Slovakia) L Wienerová	6	7

Finals
(Poland) P Kania (Russia) I Khromacheva	6	3	[6]
2	(Czech Republic) R Voráčová (Slovakia) L Wienerová	2	6	[10]
