= 2013 Trofeul Popeci =

- Date: 12–18 August
- Edition: 7th
- Draw: 32S/16D
- Prize money: $50,000+H
- Surface: Clay
- Location: Craiova, Romania

Champions

Singles
- (Slovakia) Kristína Kučová

Doubles
- (Italy) Alice Balducci / (Poland) Katarzyna Kawa
← 2012 ·	Trofeul Popeci	· 2014 →

The 2013 Trofeul Popeci was a professional tennis tournament played on outdoor clay courts. It was the seventh edition of the tournament which was part of the 2013 ITF Women's Circuit, offering a total of $50,000+H in prize money. It took place in Craiova, Romania, on 12–18 August 2013.

== Singles entrants ==
=== Seeds ===
Country	Player	Rank^{1}	Seed
ESP	Estrella Cabeza Candela	101	1
AUT	Patricia Mayr-Achleitner	170	2
ROU	Cristina Dinu	206	3
RUS	Irina Khromacheva	217	4
SVK	Kristína Kučová	220	5
NED	Arantxa Rus	240	6
ESP	Beatriz García Vidagany	246	7
CZE	Tereza Smitková	257	8

- ^{1} Rankings as of 5 August 2013

=== Other entrants ===
The following players received wildcards into the singles main draw:

- (Romania) Elena Bogdan
- (Romania) Ioana Ducu
- (Romania) Camelia Hristea
- (Romania) Ioana Loredana Roșca

The following players received entry from the qualifying draw:

- (Italy) Alice Balducci
- (Italy) Martina Caregaro
- (Spain) Inés Ferrer Suárez
- (Austria) Lisa-Maria Moser

The following player received entry by a Junior Exempt:

- (Croatia) Ana Konjuh

== Champions ==
=== Women's singles ===
- (Slovakia) Kristína Kučová def. (Italy) Alberta Brianti 7–5, 3–6, 6–4

=== Women's doubles ===
- (Italy) Alice Balducci / (Poland) Katarzyna Kawa def. (Romania) Diana Buzean / (Germany) Christina Shakovets 3–6, 7–6^{(7–3)}, [10–8]
