= 2013 Trofeul Popeci – Singles =

Singles
- 2013 Trofeul Popeci

Final
- Champion: (Slovakia) Kristína Kučová
- Runner-up: (Italy) Alberta Brianti
- Score: 7–5, 3–6, 6–4

Events
Singles	Doubles
← 2012 ·	Trofeul Popeci	· 2014 →

María Teresa Torró Flor was the defending champion, having won the event in 2012, but decided to participate at the 2013 Western & Southern Open that week.

Kristína Kučová won the title, defeating Alberta Brianti in the final, 7–5, 3–6, 6–4.

== Seeds ==
1. (Spain) Estrella Cabeza Candela (quarterfinals)
2. (Austria) Patricia Mayr-Achleitner (semifinals)
3. (Romania) Cristina Dinu (second round)
4. (Russia) Irina Khromacheva (first round; retired)
5. (Slovakia) Kristína Kučová (champion)
6. (Netherlands) Arantxa Rus (first round)
7. (Spain) Beatriz García Vidagany (quarterfinals)
8. (Czech Republic) Tereza Smitková (second round)

== Main draw ==
=== Key ===
- Q = Qualifier
- WC = Wild card
- LL = Lucky loser
- Alt = Alternate
- SE = Special exempt
- PR = Protected ranking
- ITF = ITF entry
- JE = Junior exempt
- w/o = Walkover
- r = Retired
- d = Defaulted
- SR = Special ranking

=== Finals ===
Semifinals
5	(Slovakia) Kristína Kučová	7^{7}	6^{4}	6
JE	(Croatia) Ana Konjuh	6^{3}	7^{7}	0
(Italy) Alberta Brianti	2	6	6
2	(Austria) Patricia Mayr-Achleitner	6	4	4

Final
5	(Slovakia) Kristína Kučová	7	3	6
(Italy) Alberta Brianti	5	6	4

=== Top half ===
First round
1	(Spain) E Cabeza Candela	6	6
WC	(Romania) C Hristea	2	2
(Romania) L-I Andrei	5	4
(Netherlands) L Kerkhove	7	6
(Bulgaria) D Evtimova	7^{7}	7
WC	(Romania) I Ducu	6^{4}	5
WC	(Romania) IL Roșca	1	3
5	(Slovakia) K Kučová	6	6
3	(Romania) C Dinu	6	6
Q	(Austria) L-M Moser	0	4
WC	(Romania) E Bogdan	6	1	2
JE	(Croatia) A Konjuh	4	6	6
(Italy) A Remondina	7	3	6
Q	(Italy) A Balducci	5	6	4
(Bulgaria) E Kostova	2	6^{5}
7	(Spain) B García Vidagany	6	7^{7}

Second round
1	(Spain) E Cabeza Candela	6	7^{7}
(Netherlands) L Kerkhove	3	6^{5}
(Bulgaria) D Evtimova	1	4
5	(Slovakia) K Kučová	6	6
3	(Romania) C Dinu	2	6^{1}
JE	(Croatia) A Konjuh	6	7^{7}
(Italy) A Remondina	3	2
7	(Spain) B García Vidagany	6	6

Quarterfinals
1	(Spain) E Cabeza Candela	5	5
5	(Slovakia) K Kučová	7	7
JE	(Croatia) A Konjuh	6	6
7	(Spain) B García Vidagany	3	4

Semifinals
5	(Slovakia) K Kučová	7^{7}	6^{4}	6
JE	(Croatia) A Konjuh	6^{3}	7^{7}	0

=== Bottom half ===
First round
6	(Netherlands) A Rus	4	6	2
(France) C Sibille	6	4	6
Q	(Italy) M Caregaro	0	6^{3}
Q	(Spain) I Ferrer Suárez	6	7^{7}
(Venezuela) A Gámiz	1	2
(Italy) A Brianti	6	6
(Germany) K Barrois	7^{10}	3
4	(Russia) I Khromacheva	6^{8}	1^{r}
8	(Czech Republic) T Smitková	6	3	6
(Hungary) Á Bukta	1	6	3
(Poland) K Kawa	6	6
(Italy) A Floris	1	2
(Switzerland) C Perrin	4	3
(Croatia) A Savić	6	6
(Romania) R Olaru	3	3
2	(Austria) P Mayr-Achleitner	6	6

Second round
(France) C Sibille	3	6	6
Q	(Spain) I Ferrer Suárez	6	3	1
(Italy) A Brianti	7^{7}	6^{3}	6
(Germany) K Barrois	6^{4}	7^{7}	2
8	(Czech Republic) T Smitková	4	1
(Poland) K Kawa	6	6
(Croatia) A Savić	5	2
2	(Austria) P Mayr-Achleitner	7	6

Quarterfinals
(France) C Sibille	4	6	2
(Italy) A Brianti	6	3	6
(Poland) K Kawa	1	4
2	(Austria) P Mayr-Achleitner	6	6

Semifinals
(Italy) A Brianti	2	6	6
2	(Austria) P Mayr-Achleitner	6	4	4
