= 2013 Trofeul Popeci – Doubles =

Doubles
- 2013 Trofeul Popeci

Final
- Champions: (Italy) Alice Balducci (Poland) Katarzyna Kawa
- Runners-up: (Romania) Diana Buzean (Germany) Christina Shakovets
- Score: 3–6, 7–6^{(7–3)}, [10–8]

Events
Singles	Doubles
← 2012 ·	Trofeul Popeci	· 2014 →

Renata Voráčová and Lenka Wienerová were the defending champions, having won the event in 2012, but both players decided not to participate that year.

Qualifiers Alice Balducci and Katarzyna Kawa won the title, defeating fourth seeds Diana Buzean and Christina Shakovets in the final, 3–6, 7–6^{(7–3)}, [10–8].

== Seeds ==
1. (Romania) Elena Bogdan / (Romania) Raluca Olaru (semifinals)
2. (Spain) Inés Ferrer Suárez / (Netherlands) Arantxa Rus (quarterfinals)
3. (Italy) Nicole Clerico / (Czech Republic) Nikola Fraňková (first round)
4. (Romania) Diana Buzean / (Germany) Christina Shakovets (final)

== Draw ==
=== Key ===
- Q = Qualifier
- WC = Wild card
- LL = Lucky loser
- Alt = Alternate
- SE = Special exempt
- PR = Protected ranking
- ITF = ITF entry
- JE = Junior exempt
- w/o = Walkover
- r = Retired
- d = Defaulted
- SR = Special ranking

First round
1	(Romania) E Bogdan (Romania) R Olaru	6	6
(Slovakia) V Juhászová (Czech Republic) T Smitková	2	2
(Bulgaria) D Evtimova (Bulgaria) E Kostova	3	6	[9]
(Slovakia) K Kučová (Croatia) S Njirić	6	4	[11]
4	(Romania) D Buzean (Germany) C Shakovets	7^{7}	6
WC	(Romania) S Andrei (Romania) AM Vlăduțu	6^{4}	0
(Spain) A Fernández Rabener (Venezuela) A Gámiz	6	7^{7}
WC	(Romania) C Hristea (Romania) D Marcu	4	6^{3}
WC	(Romania) L-I Andrei (Romania) L Ungur	6	5	[6]
Q	(Belgium) M Boev (Bulgaria) V Tomova	2	7	[10]
(Switzerland) C Perrin (France) C Sibille	1	6	[10]
3	(Italy) N Clerico (Czech Republic) N Fraňková	6	2	[6]
Q	(Italy) A Balducci (Poland) K Kawa	w/o
(Russia) I Khromacheva (Croatia) A Konjuh
(Germany) K Barrois (Italy) A Brianti	5	2
2	(Spain) I Ferrer Suárez (Netherlands) A Rus	7	6

Quarterfinals
1	(Romania) E Bogdan (Romania) R Olaru	6	6
(Slovakia) K Kučová (Croatia) S Njirić	1	4
4	(Romania) D Buzean (Germany) C Shakovets	6	6
(Spain) A Fernández Rabener (Venezuela) A Gámiz	4	3
Q	(Belgium) M Boev (Bulgaria) V Tomova	3	7	[10]
(Switzerland) C Perrin (France) C Sibille	6	5	[12]
Q	(Italy) A Balducci (Poland) K Kawa	3	7^{8}	[10]
2	(Spain) I Ferrer Suárez (Netherlands) A Rus	6	6^{6}	[7]

Semifinals
1	(Romania) E Bogdan (Romania) R Olaru	4	3
4	(Romania) D Buzean (Germany) C Shakovets	6	6
(Switzerland) C Perrin (France) C Sibille	3	0
Q	(Italy) A Balducci (Poland) K Kawa	6	6

Final
4	(Romania) D Buzean (Germany) C Shakovets	6	6^{3}	[8]
Q	(Italy) A Balducci (Poland) K Kawa	3	7^{7}	[10]
