= 2012 Trofeul Popeci – Singles =

Singles
- 2012 Trofeul Popeci

Final
- Champion: (Spain) María-Teresa Torró-Flor
- Runner-up: (Romania) Cristina Mitu
- Score: 6–3, 6–4

Events
Singles	Doubles
← 2011 ·	Trofeul Popeci	· 2013 →

Mihaela Buzărnescu was the defending champion, but chose not to participate.
María-Teresa Torró-Flor won the title after defeating Cristina Mitu in the final, 6–3, 6–4.

== Seeds ==
1. (Bulgaria) Elitsa Kostova (second round)
2. (Italy) Anna Floris (first round)
3. (Germany) Dinah Pfizenmaier (first round, retired)
4. (Romania) Elena Bogdan (second round)
5. (Serbia) Aleksandra Krunić (quarterfinals)
6. (Lithuania) Lina Stančiūtė (second round)
7. (Italy) Annalisa Bona (first round)
8. (Russia) Irina Khromacheva (semifinals)

== Draw ==
=== Key ===
- Q = Qualifier
- WC = Wild card
- LL = Lucky loser
- Alt = Alternate
- SE = Special exempt
- PR = Protected ranking
- ITF = ITF entry
- JE = Junior exempt
- w/o = Walkover
- r = Retired
- d = Defaulted
- SR = Special ranking

=== Finals ===
Semifinals
(Argentina) María Irigoyen	2	1
(Romania) Cristina Mitu	6	6
8	(Russia) Irina Khromacheva	1	1
SR	(Spain) María-Teresa Torró-Flor	6	6

Final
(Romania) Cristina Mitu	3	4
SR	(Spain) María-Teresa Torró-Flor	6	6

=== Top half ===
First round
1	(Bulgaria) E Kostova	6	6
(Bosnia and Herzegovina) J Tinjić	3	4
(Argentina) M Irigoyen	6	6
WC	(Romania) IL Roșca	4	2
WC	(Romania) D Marcu	2	5
(Slovenia) N Kolar	6	7
Q	(Romania) C Adamescu	1	0
5	(Serbia) A Krunić	6	6
3	(Germany) D Pfizenmaier	5	0^{r}
(Romania) C Dinu	7	3
WC	(Romania) C Hristea	3	7	2
(Slovakia) L Wienerová	6	5	6
(Slovakia) Z Luknárová	6	6
(Spain) E Fernández-Brugués	3	3
(Romania) C Mitu	7^{9}	6
7	(Italy) A Bona	6^{7}	3

Second round
1	(Bulgaria) E Kostova	7	4	4
(Argentina) M Irigoyen	5	6	6
(Slovenia) N Kolar	0	3
5	(Serbia) A Krunić	6	6
(Romania) C Dinu	6	6
(Slovakia) L Wienerová	3	0
(Slovakia) Z Luknárová	6	0	3
(Romania) C Mitu	2	6	6

Quarterfinals
(Argentina) M Irigoyen	6	2	6
5	(Serbia) A Krunić	2	6	2
(Romania) C Dinu	4	6^{2}
(Romania) C Mitu	6	7^{7}

Semifinals
(Argentina) M Irigoyen	2	1
(Romania) C Mitu	6	6

=== Bottom half ===
First round
8	(Russia) I Khromacheva	7^{7}	6
Q	(Croatia) I Akiki	6^{3}	4
(Croatia) A Vrljić	4	3
(Slovenia) M Zec-Peškirič	6	6
Q	(Venezuela) A Gámiz	3	6^{4}
(Romania) R Olaru	6	7^{7}
(Czech Republic) R Voráčová	5	6	5
4	(Romania) E Bogdan	7	1	7
6	(Lithuania) L Stančiūtė	7	6
WC	(Romania) AM Vlăduțu	5	2
SR	(Spain) M Torró-Flor	6	6
(Slovakia) L Juríková	3	0
Q	(Poland) P Kania	2	6	4
(Argentina) M Auroux	6	3	6
(Belgium) K Flipkens	7	6
2	(Italy) A Floris	5	3

Second round
8	(Russia) I Khromacheva	6^{0}	6	7^{8}
(Slovenia) M Zec-Peškirič	7^{7}	2	6^{6}
(Romania) R Olaru	7^{7}	6
4	(Romania) E Bogdan	6^{1}	1
6	(Lithuania) L Stančiūtė	6^{2}	1
SR	(Spain) M Torró-Flor	7^{7}	6
(Argentina) M Auroux	6	1	2
(Belgium) K Flipkens	4	6	6

Quarterfinals
8	(Russia) I Khromacheva	6	3	6
(Romania) R Olaru	2	6	1
SR	(Spain) M Torró-Flor	6	6
(Belgium) K Flipkens	1	1

Semifinals
8	(Russia) I Khromacheva	1	1
SR	(Spain) M Torró-Flor	6	6
