= 2015 BRD Bucharest Open =

- Date: 13–19 July
- Edition: 2nd
- Category: WTA International
- Draw: 32S / 16D
- Prize money: $250,000
- Surface: Clay
- Location: Bucharest, Romania
- Venue: Arenele BNR

Champions

Singles
- (Slovakia) Anna Karolína Schmiedlová

Doubles
- (Georgia (country)) Oksana Kalashnikova / (Netherlands) Demi Schuurs
- BRD Bucharest Open

The 2015 BRD Bucharest Open was a professional tennis tournament played on red clay courts. It was the second edition of the tournament and was part of the WTA International category of the 2015 WTA Tour. It took place at Arenele BNR in Bucharest, Romania between 13 July and 19 July 2015. seventh-seeded Anna Karolína Schmiedlová won the singles title.

== Finals ==
=== Singles ===
- (Slovakia) Anna Karolína Schmiedlová defeated (Italy) Sara Errani, 7–6^{(7–3)}, 6–3

=== Doubles ===
- (Georgia (country)) Oksana Kalashnikova / (Netherlands) Demi Schuurs defeated (Romania) Andreea Mitu / (Romania) Patricia Maria Țig, 6–2, 6–2

== Points and prize money ==
=== Point distribution ===
Event	W	F	SF	QF	Round of 16	Round of 32	Q	Q3	Q2	Q1
Singles	280	180	110	60	30	1	18	14	10	1
Doubles	280	180	110	60	1	—N/a	—N/a	—N/a	—N/a	—N/a

=== Prize money ===
Event	W	F	SF	QF	Round of 16	Round of 32	Q2	Q1
Singles	$43,000	$21,400	$11,300	$5,900	$3,310	$1,925	$730	$530
Doubles	$12,300	$6,400	$3,435	$1,820	$960	—N/a	—N/a	—N/a

== Singles main-draw entrants ==
=== Seeds ===
Country	Player	Rank^{1}	Seed
ITA	Sara Errani	19	1
ITA	Roberta Vinci	35	2
ROU	Monica Niculescu	48	3
GER	Julia Görges	56	4
ROU	Alexandra Dulgheru	60	5
CZE	Tereza Smitková	62	6
SVK	Anna Karolína Schmiedlová	63	7
GER	Annika Beck	70	8

- ^{1} Rankings as of June 29, 2015.

=== Other entrants ===
The following players received wildcards into the main draw:

- (Romania) Ana Bogdan
- (Romania) Sorana Cîrstea
- (Romania) Patricia Maria Țig

The following players received entry from the qualifying draw:

- (Romania) Cristina Dinu
- (Hungary) Réka-Luca Jani
- (Russia) Darya Kasatkina
- (Croatia) Petra Martić

=== Withdrawals ===
Before the tournament

- (Italy) Karin Knapp →replaced by Shuai Zhang
- (Croatia) Ana Konjuh →replaced by Anna Tatishvili
- (Poland) Magda Linette →replaced by Shahar Pe'er
- (France) Pauline Parmentier →replaced by Çağla Büyükakçay

=== Retirements ===
- (Romania) Alexandra Dulgheru (right knee injury)
- (Spain) Sílvia Soler Espinosa (right shoulder injury)

== WTA doubles main-draw entrants ==
=== Seeds ===
Country	Player	Country	Player	Rank^{1}	Seed
SLO	Andreja Klepač	SRB	Aleksandra Krunić	136	1
GER	Julia Görges	CRO	Petra Martić	139	2
ROU	Raluca Olaru	USA	Anna Tatishvili	150	3
GEO	Oksana Kalashnikova	NED	Demi Schuurs	186	4

- ^{1} Rankings as of June 29, 2015.

=== Other entrants ===
The following pairs received wildcards into the main draw:

- (Romania) Jaqueline Cristian / (Romania) Elena Ruse
- (Romania) Andreea Mitu / (Romania) Patricia Maria Țig

The following pair received entry as alternates:

- (Romania) Cristina Dinu / (Romania) Camelia Hristea

=== Withdrawals ===
Before the tournament

- (Israel) Shahar Pe'er (right shoulder injury)
