= 2011 ITS Cup – Doubles =

Doubles
- 2011 ITS Cup

Final
- Champion: (Netherlands) Michaëlla Krajicek (Czech Republic) Renata Voráčová
- Runner-up: (Ukraine) Yulia Beygelzimer (Romania) Elena Bogdan
- Score: 7–5, 6–4

Events
Singles	Doubles
← 2010 ·	ITS Cup	· 2012 →

Sandra Klemenschits and Patricia Mayr-Achleitner were the defending champions, but both chose not to participate.
Michaëlla Krajicek and Renata Voráčová won the title, defeating Yulia Beygelzimer and Elena Bogdan 7–5, 6–4 in the final.

== Seeds ==
1. (Netherlands) Michaëlla Krajicek / (Czech Republic) Renata Voráčová (champions)
2. (Ukraine) Yulia Beygelzimer / (Romania) Elena Bogdan (final)
3. (Austria) Yvonne Meusburger / (Liechtenstein) Stephanie Vogt (first round)
4. (Russia) Ekaterina Ivanova / (Bulgaria) Elitsa Kostova (quarterfinals)

== Draw ==
=== Key ===
- Q = Qualifier
- WC = Wild card
- LL = Lucky loser
- Alt = Alternate
- SE = Special exempt
- PR = Protected ranking
- ITF = ITF entry
- JE = Junior exempt
- w/o = Walkover
- r = Retired
- d = Defaulted
- SR = Special ranking

=== Draw ===
First round
1	(Netherlands) M Krajicek (Czech Republic) R Voráčová	6	6
(France) S Beltrame (Czech Republic) E Hrdinová	1	4
WC	(Czech Republic) D Šeděnková (Czech Republic) K Šišková	6	4	[4]
(Czech Republic) Ka Plíšková (Czech Republic) Kr Plíšková	2	6	[10]
3	(Austria) Y Meusburger (Liechtenstein) S Vogt	4	7	[5]
WC	(Czech Republic) S Dobrá (Ukraine) K Kazimova	6	5	[10]
(Romania) A Cadanţu (Romania) C Hristea	7	3	[12]
(Hungary) R-L Jani (Slovenia) M Zec Peškirič	5	6	[10]
(Spain) E Cabeza Candela (Spain) B García Vidagany	6	6
(Croatia) A Vrljić (Slovakia) L Wienerová	3	3
(France) A Bergot (Italy) N Burnett	6	2	[5]
4	(Russia) E Ivanova (Bulgaria) E Kostova	4	6	[10]
(Slovakia) R Tabak (Switzerland) S Vögele	6	6
(Czech Republic) M Borecká (Czech Republic) M Kubičíková	1	3
WC	(Czech Republic) J Jandová (Czech Republic) G Marková	0	2
2	(Ukraine) Y Beygelzimer (Romania) E Bogdan	6	6

Quarterfinals
1	(Netherlands) M Krajicek (Czech Republic) R Voráčová	6	3	[10]
(Czech Republic) Ka Plíšková (Czech Republic) Kr Plíšková	4	6	[4]
WC	(Czech Republic) S Dobrá (Ukraine) K Kazimova	1	2
(Romania) A Cadanţu (Romania) C Hristea	6	6
(Spain) E Cabeza Candela (Spain) B García Vidagany	6^{4}	7^{7}	[10]
4	(Russia) E Ivanova (Bulgaria) E Kostova	7^{7}	6^{2}	[6]
(Slovakia) R Tabak (Switzerland) S Vögele	4	2
2	(Ukraine) Y Beygelzimer (Romania) E Bogdan	6	6

Semifinals
1	(Netherlands) M Krajicek (Czech Republic) R Voráčová	6	6
(Romania) A Cadanţu (Romania) C Hristea	3	1
(Spain) E Cabeza Candela (Spain) B García Vidagany	2	0
2	(Ukraine) Y Beygelzimer (Romania) E Bogdan	6	6

Finals
1	(Netherlands) M Krajicek (Czech Republic) R Voráčová	7	6
2	(Ukraine) Y Beygelzimer (Romania) E Bogdan	5	4
