= 2011 ITS Cup – Singles =

Singles
- 2011 ITS Cup

Final
- Champion: (Italy) Nastassya Burnett
- Runner-up: (Czech Republic) Eva Birnerová
- Score: 6–1, 6–3

Events
Singles	Doubles
← 2010 ·	ITS Cup	· 2012 →

Patricia Mayr-Achleitner was the defending champion, but chose not to participate.
Nastassya Burnett won the title, defeating Eva Birnerová 6–1, 6–3 in the final.

== Seeds ==
1. (Czech Republic) Sandra Záhlavová (first round)
2. (Austria) Yvonne Meusburger (second round)
3. (Czech Republic) Eva Birnerová (final)
4. (Czech Republic) Renata Voráčová (quarterfinals)
5. (Switzerland) Stefanie Vögele (quarterfinals)
6. (Romania) Elena Bogdan (first round)
7. (Romania) Alexandra Cadanţu (quarterfinals)
8. (Ukraine) Yulia Beygelzimer (semifinals)

== Main draw ==
=== Key ===
- Q = Qualifier
- WC = Wild card
- LL = Lucky loser
- Alt = Alternate
- SE = Special exempt
- PR = Protected ranking
- ITF = ITF entry
- JE = Junior exempt
- w/o = Walkover
- r = Retired
- d = Defaulted
- SR = Special ranking

=== Finals ===
Semifinals
Q	(Italy) Nastassya Burnett	6	6
8	(Ukraine) Yulia Beygelzimer	3	4
3	(Czech Republic) Eva Birnerová	6	6
WC	(Slovenia) Nastja Kolar	2	3

Final
Q	(Italy) Nastassya Burnett	6	6
3	(Czech Republic) Eva Birnerová	1	3

=== Top half ===
First round
1	(Czech Republic) S Záhlavová	5	6	4
Q	(Italy) N Burnett	7	4	6
(Liechtenstein) S Vogt	5	1
(Hungary) R-L Jani	7	6
(Bulgaria) E Kostova	6	6
(France) S Beltrame	3	3
(Czech Republic) Kr Plíšková	6	6
6	(Romania) E Bogdan	3	3
4	(Czech Republic) R Voráčová	6	6
WC	(Ukraine) K Kazimova	0	2
(Germany) A-L Grönefeld	6	6
(Slovenia) M Zec Peškirič	3	4
(Slovakia) L Wienerová	6	4	6
(Poland) M Linette	4	6	4
Q	(Germany) N Zander	1	2
8	(Ukraine) Y Beygelzimer	6	6

Second round
Q	(Italy) N Burnett	3	6	6
(Hungary) R-L Jani	6	4	1
(Bulgaria) E Kostova	6	6
(Czech Republic) Kr Plíšková	4	3
4	(Czech Republic) R Voráčová	6	6
(Germany) A-L Grönefeld	3	0
(Slovakia) L Wienerová	6	6
8	(Ukraine) Y Beygelzimer	4	2

Quarterfinals
Q	(Italy) N Burnett	5	7^{7}	6
(Bulgaria) E Kostova	7	6^{4}	4
4	(Czech Republic) R Voráčová	4	4
8	(Ukraine) Y Beygelzimer	6	6

Semifinals
Q	(Italy) N Burnett	6	6
8	(Ukraine) Y Beygelzimer	3	4

=== Bottom half ===
First round
5	(Switzerland) S Vögele	6	6
(Czech Republic) Ka Plíšková	2	3
(Russia) E Ivanova	1	1
(Croatia) A Vrljić	6	6
(France) L Thorpe	6	6
WC	(Czech Republic) M Kubičíková	4	2
Q	(France) A Bergot	3	6^{2}
3	(Czech Republic) E Birnerová	6	7^{7}
7	(Romania) A Cadanţu	6	7
(Netherlands) M Krajicek	3	5
(Spain) B García Vidagany	6	6
Q	(Croatia) D Banoveć	3	2
WC	(Slovenia) N Kolar	4	7^{8}	6
(Spain) E Cabeza Candela	6	6^{6}	4
WC	(Germany) J Gahdri	1	0
2	(Austria) Y Meusburger	6	6

Second round
5	(Switzerland) S Vögele	1	7^{3}	6
(Croatia) A Vrljić	6	6	4
(France) L Thorpe	0	1
3	(Czech Republic) E Birnerová	6	6
7	(Romania) A Cadanţu	6	2	6
(Spain) B García Vidagany	3	6	2
WC	(Slovenia) N Kolar	6	5	7^{7}
2	(Austria) Y Meusburger	2	6	6^{3}

Quarterfinals
5	(Switzerland) S Vögele	6	6^{6}	4
3	(Czech Republic) E Birnerová	3	7^{8}	6
7	(Romania) A Cadanţu	5	2
WC	(Slovenia) N Kolar	7	6

Semifinals
3	(Czech Republic) E Birnerová	6	6
WC	(Slovenia) N Kolar	2	3
