= 2012 ITS Cup =

- Date: 23–29 July
- Edition: 4th
- Surface: Clay (outdoor)
- Location: Olomouc, Czech Republic

Champions

Singles
- (Spain) María Teresa Torró Flor

Doubles
- (Spain) Inés Ferrer Suárez / (Netherlands) Richèl Hogenkamp
- ITS Cup

The 2012 ITS Cup was a professional tennis tournament played on outdoor clay courts. It was the fourth edition of the tournament which was part of the 2012 ITF Women's Circuit. It took place in Olomouc, Czech Republic, on 23–29 July 2012.

== WTA entrants ==
=== Seeds ===
Country	Player	Rank^{1}	Seed
CZE	Barbora Záhlavová-Strýcová	60	1
ROU	Alexandra Cadanțu	77	2
FRA	Mathilde Johansson	83	3
ESP	Garbiñe Muguruza	106	4
ARG	Paula Ormaechea	124	5
SUI	Stefanie Vögele	132	6
RUS	Valeria Savinykh	133	7
GER	Tatjana Malek	135	8

- Rankings as of 16 July 2012

=== Other entrants ===
The following players received wildcards into the singles main draw:

- (Poland) Anna Korzeniak
- (Czech Republic) Kateřina Kramperová
- (Hungary) Vanda Lukács
- (Latvia) Anastasija Sevastova

The following players received entry from the qualifying draw:

- (Russia) Elena Bovina
- (Italy) Corinna Dentoni
- (Spain) Inés Ferrer Suárez
- (Slovakia) Kristína Kučová

The following player received entry from a Special Exempt spot:

- (Spain) María Teresa Torró Flor

The following player received entry through her Protected Ranking:

- (Czech Republic) Zuzana Ondrášková

== Champions ==
=== Singles ===
- (Spain) María Teresa Torró Flor def. (Romania) Alexandra Cadanțu 6–2, 6–3

=== Doubles ===
- (Spain) Inés Ferrer Suárez / (Netherlands) Richèl Hogenkamp def. (Ukraine) Yuliya Beygelzimer / (Czech Republic) Renata Voráčová 6–2, 7–6^{(7–4)}
