= 2015 BRD Bucharest Open – Singles =

Singles
- 2015 BRD Bucharest Open

Final
- Champion: (Slovakia) Anna Karolína Schmiedlová
- Runner-up: (Italy) Sara Errani
- Score: 7–6^{(7–3)}, 6–3

Details
- Draw: 32
- Seeds: 8

Events
Singles	Doubles
- BRD Bucharest Open

Simona Halep was the defending champion, but chose not to participate this year.

Anna Karolína Schmiedlová won the title, defeating Sara Errani in the final, 7–6^{(7–3)}, 6–3.

== Seeds ==
1. (Italy) Sara Errani (final)
2. (Italy) Roberta Vinci (second round)
3. (Romania) Monica Niculescu (semifinals)
4. (Germany) Julia Görges (second round)
5. (Romania) Alexandra Dulgheru (second round, retired)
6. (Czech Republic) Tereza Smitková (first round)
7. (Slovakia) Anna Karolína Schmiedlová (champion)
8. (Germany) Annika Beck (first round)

== Draw ==
Key

- Q = Qualifier
- WC = Wild card
- LL = Lucky loser
- Alt = Alternate
- ITF = ITF entry
- PR = Protected ranking
- SR = Special ranking
- SE = Special exempt
- JE = Junior exempt
- JR = Junior Accelerator Programme entrant
- CO = College Accelerator Programme entrant
- NG = Next Gen Accelerator Program entrant
- w/o = Walkover
- r = Retired
- d = Defaulted

=== Finals ===
Semifinals
1	(Italy) Sara Errani	5	6	6
3	(Romania) Monica Niculescu	7	1	2
7	(Slovakia) Anna Karolína Schmiedlová	6	6
(Slovenia) Polona Hercog	4	3

Final
1	(Italy) Sara Errani	6^{3}	3
7	(Slovakia) Anna Karolína Schmiedlová	7^{7}	6

=== Top half ===
First round
1	(Italy) S Errani	6	7^{7}
(Turkey) Ç Büyükakçay	2	6^{2}
(Ukraine) K Bondarenko	6	4	4
(Israel) S Pe'er	2	6	6
(United States) A Tatishvili	6	7
(Switzerland) S Vögele	4	5
(China) S Zhang	6	4	4
5	(Romania) A Dulgheru	3	6	6
3	(Romania) M Niculescu	6	5	6
WC	(Romania) A Bogdan	2	7	2
(Slovakia) K Kučová	3	7^{7}	6^{6}
(Brazil) T Pereira	6	6^{4}	7^{8}
WC	(Romania) S Cîrstea	6	6
(Bulgaria) S Karatantcheva	2	2
(Romania) A Mitu	1	6	6
8	(Germany) A Beck	6	3	3

Second round
1	(Italy) S Errani	7^{7}	6
(Israel) S Pe'er	6^{5}	2
(United States) A Tatishvili	5
5	(Romania) A Dulgheru	2^{r}
3	(Romania) M Niculescu	6	6
(Brazil) T Pereira	2	3
WC	(Romania) S Cîrstea	7	2	4
(Romania) A Mitu	5	6	6

Quarterfinals
1	(Italy) S Errani	6	6
(United States) A Tatishvili	2	3
3	(Romania) M Niculescu	4	6	6
(Romania) A Mitu	6	0	2

Semifinals
1	(Italy) S Errani	5	6	6
3	(Romania) M Niculescu	7	1	2

=== Bottom half ===
First round
7	(Slovakia) AK Schmiedlová	6	6
Q	(Hungary) R-L Jani	1	2
(Czech Republic) D Allertová	6	3	6
Q	(Romania) C Dinu	4	6	3
Q	(Croatia) P Martić	3	4
(Montenegro) D Kovinić	6	6
Q	(Russia) D Kasatkina	6^{4}	4
4	(Germany) J Görges	7^{7}	6
6	(Czech Republic) T Smitková	2	5
(Slovenia) P Hercog	6	7
WC	(Romania) PM Țig	6	3
(Spain) S Soler Espinosa	4	1^{r}
(Serbia) A Krunić	6	6
(Russia) E Kulichkova	2	4
(Hungary) T Babos	2	1
2	(Italy) R Vinci	6	6

Second round
7	(Slovakia) AK Schmiedlová	6	6
(Czech Republic) D Allertová	1	2
(Montenegro) D Kovinić	6	6^{8}	6
4	(Germany) J Görges	4	7^{10}	2
(Slovenia) P Hercog	6	6
WC	(Romania) PM Țig	0	2
(Serbia) A Krunić	6	6
2	(Italy) R Vinci	1	1

Quarterfinals
7	(Slovakia) AK Schmiedlová	6	6
(Montenegro) D Kovinić	2	2
(Slovenia) P Hercog	6	6
(Serbia) A Krunić	3	3

Semifinals
7	(Slovakia) AK Schmiedlová	6	6
(Slovenia) P Hercog	4	3

== Qualifying ==
=== Seeds ===
1. (Kazakhstan) Yaroslava Shvedova (qualifying competition)
2. (Croatia) Petra Martić (qualified)
3. (Japan) Risa Ozaki (second round)
4. (Russia) Darya Kasatkina (qualified)
5. (Poland) Katarzyna Piter (first round)
6. (Greece) Maria Sakkari (qualifying competition)
7. (Argentina) Florencia Molinero (first round)
8. (Belgium) Elise Mertens (first round)

=== Qualifiers ===
1. (Romania) Cristina Dinu
2. (Croatia) Petra Martić
3. (Hungary) Réka-Luca Jani
4. (Russia) Darya Kasatkina

=== Draw ===
==== First qualifier ====
First round
1	(Kazakhstan) Yaroslava Shvedova	6	6
(Russia) Victoria Kan	2	3
(Hungary) Vanda Lukács	3	6	3
(Austria) Tamira Paszek	6	3	6
(Spain) Yvonne Cavallé Reimers	6	7
WC	(Romania) Irina Fetecău	2	5
(Romania) Cristina Dinu	6	6
8	(Belgium) Elise Mertens	1	4

Second round
1	(Kazakhstan) Yaroslava Shvedova	7^{7}	7^{8}
(Austria) Tamira Paszek	6^{4}	6^{6}
(Spain) Yvonne Cavallé Reimers	2	6	2
(Romania) Cristina Dinu	6	3	6

Qualifying competition
1	(Kazakhstan) Yaroslava Shvedova	3	3
(Romania) Cristina Dinu	6	6

==== Second qualifier ====
First round
2	(Croatia) Petra Martić	7^{7}	6
(Slovenia) Nastja Kolar	6^{5}	1
(Germany) Jasmin Jebawy	2	2
(Italy) Gaia Sanesi	6	6
(Switzerland) Viktorija Golubic	7	1	6
(Romania) Elena Bogdan	5	6	0
(Czech Republic) Tereza Martincová	6	6
5	(Poland) Katarzyna Piter	3	3

Second round
2	(Croatia) Petra Martić	6	6
(Italy) Gaia Sanesi	4	1
(Switzerland) Viktorija Golubic	6^{4}	6	6
(Czech Republic) Tereza Martincová	7^{7}	4	2

Qualifying competition
2	(Croatia) Petra Martić	6	6^{5}	7^{7}
(Switzerland) Viktorija Golubic	4	7^{7}	6^{2}

==== Third qualifier ====
First round
3	(Japan) Risa Ozaki	7	6
(Czech Republic) Nicole Vaidišová	5	1
(Hungary) Réka-Luca Jani	6	6
WC	(Turkey) Ayla Aksu	2	3
(Romania) Mihaela Buzărnescu	6	6
WC	(Romania) Jaqueline Cristian	3	4
(Romania) Irina Maria Bara	6	6
7	(Argentina) Florencia Molinero	2	2

Second round
3	(Japan) Risa Ozaki	7^{7}	4	4
(Hungary) Réka-Luca Jani	6^{4}	6	6
(Romania) Mihaela Buzărnescu	6	2	6
(Romania) Irina Maria Bara	4	6	3

Qualifying competition
(Hungary) Réka-Luca Jani	6	2	6
(Romania) Mihaela Buzărnescu	4	6	3

==== Fourth qualifier ====
First round
4	(Russia) Daria Kasatkina	6	6
(Ukraine) Anastasiya Vasylyeva	0	2
(Ukraine) Valeriya Strakhova	2	6	4
(Romania) Cristina Ene	6	4	6
WC	(Romania) Elena-Gabriela Ruse	6	6
(Romania) Alexandra Cadanțu	4	4
(Bulgaria) Aleksandrina Naydenova	3	2
6	(Greece) Maria Sakkari	6	6

Second round
4	(Russia) Daria Kasatkina	6	6
(Romania) Cristina Ene	1	2
WC	(Romania) Elena-Gabriela Ruse	2	3
6	(Greece) Maria Sakkari	6	6

Qualifying competition
4	(Russia) Daria Kasatkina	6	7
6	(Greece) Maria Sakkari	1	5
