= 2012 ITS Cup – Singles =

Singles
- 2012 ITS Cup

Final
- Champion: (Spain) María Teresa Torró Flor
- Runner-up: (Romania) Alexandra Cadanțu
- Score: 6–2, 6–3

Events
Singles	Doubles
← 2011 ·	ITS Cup	· 2013 →

Nastassja Burnett was the defending champion, but lost to Tatjana Malek in the second round.

María Teresa Torró Flor won the title, defeating Alexandra Cadanțu in the final, 6–2, 6–3.

== Seeds ==
1. (Czech Republic) Barbora Záhlavová-Strýcová (first round)
2. (Romania) Alexandra Cadanțu (final)
3. (France) Mathilde Johansson (second round)
4. (Spain) Garbiñe Muguruza (second round)
5. (Argentina) Paula Ormaechea (first round)
6. (Switzerland) Stefanie Vögele (first round)
7. (Russia) Valeria Savinykh (first round)
8. (Germany) Tatjana Malek (quarterfinals)

== Draw ==
=== Key ===
- Q = Qualifier
- WC = Wild card
- LL = Lucky loser
- Alt = Alternate
- SE = Special exempt
- PR = Protected ranking
- ITF = ITF entry
- JE = Junior exempt
- w/o = Walkover
- r = Retired
- d = Defaulted
- SR = Special ranking

=== Finals ===
Semifinals
SE	(Spain) María Teresa Torró Flor	6	6
(Austria) Yvonne Meusburger	3	3
Q	(Italy) Corinna Dentoni	2	2
2	(Romania) Alexandra Cadanțu	6	6

Final
SE	(Spain) María Teresa Torró Flor	6	6
2	(Romania) Alexandra Cadanțu	2	3

=== Top half ===
First round
1	(Czech Republic) B Záhlavová-Strýcová	3	1
SE	(Spain) MT Torró Flor	6	6
WC	(Poland) A Korzeniak	3	3
Q	(Russia) E Bovina	6	6
(Netherlands) R Hogenkamp	5	2
(Italy) N Burnett	7	6
WC	(Czech Republic) K Kramperová	1	0
8	(Germany) T Malek	6	6
4	(Spain) G Muguruza	6	6
Q	(Slovakia) K Kučová	4	2
(Bulgaria) D Evtimova	6^{0}	2
(Italy) ME Camerin	7^{7}	6
(Ukraine) Y Beygelzimer	6^{4}	6	2
(Germany) A Beck	7^{7}	3	6
(Austria) Y Meusburger	6^{6}	6	6
6	(Switzerland) S Vögele	7^{8}	4	4

Second round
SE	(Spain) MT Torró Flor	4	6	6
Q	(Russia) E Bovina	6	2	3
(Italy) N Burnett	6^{3}	4
8	(Germany) T Malek	7^{7}	6
4	(Spain) G Muguruza	6^{3}	0
(Italy) ME Camerin	7^{7}	6
(Germany) A Beck	6	3	0
(Austria) Y Meusburger	3	6	6

Quarterfinals
SE	(Spain) MT Torró Flor	6	6
8	(Germany) T Malek	0	0
(Italy) ME Camerin	1	7	4
(Austria) Y Meusburger	6	5	6

Semifinals
SE	(Spain) MT Torró Flor	6	6
(Austria) Y Meusburger	3	3

=== Bottom half ===
First round
5	(Argentina) P Ormaechea	2	6	6^{3}
(Italy) A Floris	6	2	7^{7}
Q	(Italy) C Dentoni	6	7^{7}
(Romania) M Buzărnescu	0	6^{2}
(Romania) M Gojnea	6	6
WC	(Hungary) V Lukács	0	1
(Germany) S Gronert	4	6	4
3	(France) M Johansson	6	4	6
7	(Russia) V Savinykh	6	5	4
(Puerto Rico) M Puig	4	7	6
(Bulgaria) E Kostova	4	6	7
PR	(Czech Republic) Z Ondrášková	6	4	5
(Switzerland) A Sadiković	2	1
WC	(Latvia) A Sevastova	6	6
Q	(Spain) I Ferrer Suárez	1	3
2	(Romania) A Cadanțu	6	6

Second round
(Italy) A Floris	5	2
Q	(Italy) C Dentoni	7	6
(Romania) M Gojnea	2	6	6
3	(France) M Johansson	6	2	1
(Puerto Rico) M Puig	6	6
(Bulgaria) E Kostova	1	3
WC	(Latvia) A Sevastova	5	2
2	(Romania) A Cadanțu	7	6

Quarterfinals
Q	(Italy) C Dentoni	7^{7}	6
(Romania) M Gojnea	6^{3}	4
(Puerto Rico) M Puig	6^{5}	3
2	(Romania) A Cadanțu	7^{7}	6

Semifinals
Q	(Italy) C Dentoni	2	2
2	(Romania) A Cadanțu	6	6
