= 2012 ITS Cup – Doubles =

Doubles
- 2012 ITS Cup

Final
- Champions: (Spain) Inés Ferrer Suárez (Netherlands) Richèl Hogenkamp
- Runners-up: (Ukraine) Yuliya Beygelzimer (Czech Republic) Renata Voráčová
- Score: 6–2, 7–6^{(7–4)}

Events
Singles	Doubles
← 2011 ·	ITS Cup	· 2013 →

The 2012 ITS Cup Doubles was a professional tennis tournament played on outdoor clay courts in Olomouc, Czech Republic.

Michaëlla Krajicek and Renata Voráčová were the defending champions, but Krajicek chose not to participate. Therefore, Voráčová partnered up with Yuliya Beygelzimer, but lost in the final to Inés Ferrer Suárez and Richèl Hogenkamp 2–6, 6–7^{(4–7)}.

== Seeds ==
1. (Czech Republic) Eva Hrdinová / (Bosnia and Herzegovina) Mervana Jugić-Salkić (semifinals)
2. (Austria) Sandra Klemenschits / (Germany) Tatjana Malek (quarterfinals)
3. (Russia) Elena Bovina / (Russia) Valeria Savinykh (first round)
4. (Croatia) Maria Abramović / (Romania) Mihaela Buzărnescu (quarterfinals)

== Draw ==
=== Key ===
- Q = Qualifier
- WC = Wild card
- LL = Lucky loser
- Alt = Alternate
- SE = Special exempt
- PR = Protected ranking
- ITF = ITF entry
- JE = Junior exempt
- w/o = Walkover
- r = Retired
- d = Defaulted
- SR = Special ranking

=== Draw ===
First round
1	(Czech Republic) E Hrdinová (Bosnia and Herzegovina) M Jugić-Salkić	6	6^{3}	[10]
(Russia) M Kondratieva (France) S Lefèvre	3	7^{7}	[2]
(Switzerland) A Sadiković (Croatia) A Vrljić	6	7
(Czech Republic) H Birnerová (Bulgaria) E Kostova	2	5
4	(Croatia) M Abramović (Romania) M Buzărnescu	7	7
(Czech Republic) S Dobrá (Czech Republic) L Kriegsmannová	5	5
WC	(Russia) L Avanesyan (Czech Republic) K Novotná	3	2
(Spain) I Ferrer Suárez (Netherlands) R Hogenkamp	6	6
WC	(Poland) A Korzeniak (Czech Republic) K Šišková	6	6
WC	(Czech Republic) B Štefková (Czech Republic) B Třeštíková	2	1
(Argentina) P Ormaechea (Switzerland) S Vögele	6	2	[10]
3	(Russia) E Bovina (Russia) V Savinykh	4	6	[3]
(Ukraine) Y Beygelzimer (Czech Republic) R Voráčová	6	6
(Poland) K Piter (Poland) B Sobaszkiewicz	4	1
(Czech Republic) K Kramperová (Czech Republic) M Kubičíková	1	4
2	(Austria) S Klemenschits (Germany) T Malek	6	6

Quarterfinals
1	(Czech Republic) E Hrdinová (Bosnia and Herzegovina) M Jugić-Salkić	3	6	[10]
(Switzerland) A Sadiković (Croatia) A Vrljić	6	1	[7]
4	(Croatia) M Abramović (Romania) M Buzărnescu	1	4
(Spain) I Ferrer Suárez (Netherlands) R Hogenkamp	6	6
WC	(Poland) A Korzeniak (Czech Republic) K Šišková	7^{7}	2	[3]
(Argentina) P Ormaechea (Switzerland) S Vögele	6^{4}	6	[10]
(Ukraine) Y Beygelzimer (Czech Republic) R Voráčová	6	6
2	(Austria) S Klemenschits (Germany) T Malek	3	4

Semifinals
1	(Czech Republic) E Hrdinová (Bosnia and Herzegovina) M Jugić-Salkić	6^{3}	2
(Spain) I Ferrer Suárez (Netherlands) R Hogenkamp	7^{7}	6
(Argentina) P Ormaechea (Switzerland) S Vögele	3	4
(Ukraine) Y Beygelzimer (Czech Republic) R Voráčová	6	6

Finals
(Spain) I Ferrer Suárez (Netherlands) R Hogenkamp	6	7^{7}
(Ukraine) Y Beygelzimer (Czech Republic) R Voráčová	2	6^{4}
