= 2011 ITS Cup =

- Date: 25–31 July
- Edition: 3rd
- Location: Olomouc, Czech Republic

Champions

Singles
- (Italy) Nastassya Burnett

Doubles
- (Netherlands) Michaëlla Krajicek / (Czech Republic) Renata Voráčová
- ITS Cup

The 2011 ITS Cup was a professional tennis tournament played on clay courts. It was the third edition of the tournament which was part of the 2011 ITF Women's Circuit. It took place in Olomouc, Czech Republic between 25 and 31 July 2011.

== WTA entrants ==
=== Seeds ===
Country	Player	Rank^{1}	Seed
CZE	Sandra Záhlavová	114	1
AUT	Yvonne Meusburger	119	2
CZE	Eva Birnerová	125	3
CZE	Renata Voráčová	130	4
SUI	Stefanie Vögele	139	5
ROU	Elena Bogdan	151	6
ROU	Alexandra Cadanţu	152	7
RUS	Yuliya Beygelzimer	154	8

- ^{1} Rankings are as of July 18, 2011.

=== Other entrants ===
The following players received wildcards into the singles main draw:

- (Germany) Jara Ghadri
- (Ukraine) Khristina Kazimova
- (Slovenia) Nastja Kolar
- (Czech Republic) Martina Kubičíková

The following players received entry from the qualifying draw:

- (Croatia) Dijana Banoveć
- (France) Audrey Bergot
- (Italy) Nastassya Burnett
- (Germany) Nina Zander

== Champions ==
=== Singles ===
(Italy) Nastassya Burnett def. (Czech Republic) Eva Birnerová, 6–1, 6–3

=== Doubles ===
(Netherlands) Michaëlla Krajicek / (Czech Republic) Renata Voráčová def. (Ukraine) Yuliya Beygelzimer / (Romania) Elena Bogdan, 7–5, 6–4
