= 2015 BRD Bucharest Open – Doubles =

Doubles
- 2015 BRD Bucharest Open

Final
- Champions: (Georgia (country)) Oksana Kalashnikova (Netherlands) Demi Schuurs
- Runners-up: (Romania) Andreea Mitu (Romania) Patricia Maria Țig
- Score: 6–2, 6–2

Details
- Draw: 16
- Seeds: 4

Events
Singles	Doubles
- BRD Bucharest Open

Elena Bogdan and Alexandra Cadanțu were the defending champions, but lost in the quarterfinals to Raluca Olaru and Anna Tatishvili.
Oksana Kalashnikova and Demi Schuurs won the title, defeating Andreea Mitu and Patricia Maria Țig in the final, 6–2, 6–2.

== Seeds ==
1. (Slovenia) Andreja Klepač / (Serbia) Aleksandra Krunić (quarterfinals)
2. (Germany) Julia Görges / (Croatia) Petra Martić (first round)
3. (Romania) Raluca Olaru / (United States) Anna Tatishvili (semifinals)
4. (Georgia (country)) Oksana Kalashnikova / (Netherlands) Demi Schuurs (champions)

== Draw ==
Key

- Q = Qualifier
- WC = Wild card
- LL = Lucky loser
- Alt = Alternate
- ITF = ITF entry
- PR = Protected ranking
- SR = Special ranking
- SE = Special exempt
- JE = Junior exempt
- JR = Junior Accelerator Programme entrant
- CO = College Accelerator Programme entrant
- NG = Next Gen Accelerator Program entrant
- w/o = Walkover
- r = Retired
- d = Defaulted

First round
1	(Slovenia) A Klepač (Serbia) A Krunić	6	6
(Ukraine) V Strakhova (Ukraine) A Vasylyeva	0	0
(Romania) IM Bara (Romania) M Buzărnescu	4	2
(Ukraine) K Bondarenko (Czech Republic) E Hrdinová	6	6
4	(Georgia (country)) O Kalashnikova (Netherlands) D Schuurs	6	7
(Argentina) F Molinero (Russia) V Solovyeva	3	5
Alt	(Romania) C Dinu (Romania) C Hristea	3	2
(Slovenia) N Kolar (Belgium) E Mertens	6	6
WC	(Romania) J Cristian (Romania) E Ruse	3	3
(Romania) E Bogdan (Romania) A Cadanțu	6	6
(Montenegro) D Kovinić (Poland) K Piter	3	4
3	(Romania) R Olaru (United States) A Tatishvili	6	6
(Turkey) Ç Büyükakçay (Switzerland) V Golubic	6	6
(Romania) D Buzean (Slovakia) C Škamlová	2	1
WC	(Romania) A Mitu (Romania) PM Țig	6	3	[10]
2	(Germany) J Görges (Croatia) P Martić	3	6	[8]

Quarterfinals
1	(Slovenia) A Klepač (Serbia) A Krunić	7	5	[7]
(Ukraine) K Bondarenko (Czech Republic) E Hrdinová	5	7	[10]
4	(Georgia (country)) O Kalashnikova (Netherlands) D Schuurs	5	7^{7}	[10]
(Slovenia) N Kolar (Belgium) E Mertens	7	6^{1}	[6]
(Romania) E Bogdan (Romania) A Cadanțu	2	1
3	(Romania) R Olaru (United States) A Tatishvili	6	6
(Turkey) Ç Büyükakçay (Switzerland) V Golubic	3	6	[5]
WC	(Romania) A Mitu (Romania) PM Țig	6	3	[10]

Semifinals
(Ukraine) K Bondarenko (Czech Republic) E Hrdinová	6	0	[6]
4	(Georgia (country)) O Kalashnikova (Netherlands) D Schuurs	2	6	[10]
3	(Romania) R Olaru (United States) A Tatishvili	5	6	5
WC	(Romania) A Mitu (Romania) PM Țig	7	4	[10]

Final
4	(Georgia (country)) O Kalashnikova (Netherlands) D Schuurs	6	6
WC	(Romania) A Mitu (Romania) PM Țig	2	2
