= Alice Balducci =

Italian tennis player

- Country (sports): Italy
- Born: 11 September 1986 (age 38)
- Plays: Right-handed (two-handed backhand)
- Prize money: $103,574

Singles
- Career record: 358–294
- Career titles: 8 ITF
- Highest ranking: No. 361 (26 May 2014)

Doubles
- Career record: 194–152
- Career titles: 22 ITF
- Highest ranking: No. 290 (20 August 2012)

Alice Balducci (born 11 September 1986) is an Italian former tennis player.

Balducci won eight singles and 22 doubles titles on the ITF Circuit. On 26 May 2014, she reached her best singles ranking of world No. 361. On 20 August 2012, she peaked at No. 290 in the WTA doubles rankings.

Partnering Katarzyna Kawa, Balducci won her first $50k tournament at the 2013 Trofeul Popeci, defeating Diana Buzean and Christina Shakovets in the final.

== ITF Circuit finals ==
Legend
$50,000 tournaments
$25,000 tournaments
$10/15,000 tournaments

=== Singles: 17 (8 titles, 9 runner-ups) ===
Result	No.	Date	Tournament	Surface	Opponent	Score
Loss	1.	8 May 2007	ITF Edinburgh, United Kingdom	Clay	(South Africa) Surina De Beer	2–6, 2–6
Loss	2.	6 July 2009	ITF Imola, Italy	Carpet	(Italy) Anna Remondina	2–6, 5–7
Loss	3.	15 August 2011	Internazionali di Todi, Italy	Clay	(Italy) Alice Moroni	1–6, 6–4, 3–6
Loss	4.	27 May 2013	ITF Cantanhede, Portugal	Hard	(Portugal) Bárbara Luz	3–6, 6–2, 5–7
Win	1.	1 July 2013	ITF Todi, Italy	Clay	(Armenia) Ani Amiraghyan	6–4, 6–3
Win	2.	22 July 2013	ITF Rimini, Italy	Clay	(United States) Sabrina Santamaria	6–2, 6–1
Win	3.	23 September 2013	ITF Pula, Italy	Clay	(Italy) Claudia Giovine	6–2, 6–4
Win	4.	24 March 2014	ITF Pula, Italy	Clay	(France) Estelle Cascino	6–3, 5–7, 6–3
Win	5.	31 March 2014	ITF Pula, Italy	Clay	(Spain) Inés Ferrer Suárez	6–7, 6–1, 6–0
Loss	5.	28 April 2014	ITF Pula, Italy	Clay	(Latvia) Jeļena Ostapenko	6–4, 6–7, 3–6
Loss	6.	5 April 2015	ITF Pula, Italy	Clay	(Italy) Georgia Brescia	3–6, 6–3, 4–6
Loss	7.	19 April 2015	ITF Pula, Italy	Clay	(Italy) Nastassja Burnett	2–6, 2–6
Win	6.	25 July 2015	ITF Viserba, Italy	Clay	(Russia) Marina Shamayko	6–3, 6–2
Win	7.	13 September 2015	ITF Pula, Italy	Clay	(France) Carla Touly	6–3, 6–2
Win	8.	18 September 2016	ITF Pula, Italy	Clay	(Switzerland) Tess Sugnaux	6–4, 6–1
Loss	8.	25 September 2016	ITF Pula, Italy	Clay	(Switzerland) Ylena In-Albon	5–7, 2–6
Loss	9.	2 October 2016	ITF Pula, Italy	Clay	(Italy) Claudia Giovine	4–6, 3–6

=== Doubles: 42 (22 titles, 20 runner-ups) ===
Result	No.	Date	Tournament	Surface	Partner	Opponents	Score
Loss	1.	10 August 2004	ITF Coimbra, Portugal	Hard	(Slovenia) Maša Zec Peškirič	(Argentina) Natalia Garbellotto (Spain) Gabriela Velasco Andreu	4–6, 1–6
Loss	2.	21 September 2004	ITF Volos, Greece	Carpet	(Italy) Cristina Celani	(Czech Republic) Eva Valková (Czech Republic) Sandra Záhlavová	6–7, 1–6
Win	1.	17 October 2005	ITF Settimo San Pietro, Italy	Clay	(Italy) Nancy Rustignoli	(Czech Republic) Simona Dobrá (Czech Republic) Renata Kučerková	6–2, 6–4
Loss	3.	21 August 2006	ITF Trecastagni, Italy	Hard	(Switzerland) Lisa Sabino	(France) Kildine Chevalier (Italy) Giulia Meruzzi	6–4, 3–6, 3–6
Win	2.	4 June 2007	ITF Birkerød, Denmark	Clay	(Italy) Elena Pioppo	(Latvia) Irina Kuzmina (Czech Republic) Zora Vlcková	6–7^{(7)}, 6–2, 6–0
Win	3.	9 July 2007	ITF Imola, Italy	Clay	(Switzerland) Lisa Sabino	(Italy) Nicole Clerico (France) Nadege Vergos	6–1, 6–4
Win	4.	3 August 2007	ITF Gardone Val Trompia, Italy	Clay	(France) Kildine Chevalier	(Italy) Anastasia Grymalska (Russia) Valeria Savinykh	3–6, 7–6^{(5)}, 6–3
Loss	4.	9 August 2007	ITF Jesi, Italy	Carpet	(Ukraine) Irina Buryachok	(Spain) Melisa Cabrera-Handt (Spain) Carolina Gago-Fuentes	5–7, 6–4, 4–6
Loss	5.	9 June 2008	ITF Lenzerheide, Switzerland	Clay	(Switzerland) Lisa Sabino	(Netherlands) Michelle Gerards (Netherlands) Marlot Meddens	0–6, 3–6
Win	5.	21 July 2008	ITF Jesi, Italy	Hard	(Italy) Federica Denti	(Italy) Giulia Bruzzone (Serbia) Aleksandra Markovic	6–4, 6–3
Loss	6.	20 October 2008	ITF Oristano, Italy	Hard	(Italy) Elisa Salis	(Italy) Silvia Disderi (Italy) Giulia Gatto-Monticone	0–6, 2–6
Loss	7.	15 August 2009	ITF Pesaro, Italy	Clay	(Italy) Federica di Sarra	(Italy) Anastasia Grymalska (Italy) Martina Trevisan	2–6, 2–6
Win	6.	17 August 2009	ITF Trecastagni, Italy	Hard	(Italy) Giulia Gasparri	(Spain) Lucia Cervera-Vazquez (Spain) Paula Fondevila Castro	7–5, 4–6, [10–8]
Win	7.	26 April 2010	ITF Bournemouth, UK	Clay	(Italy) Martina Caciotti	(Australia) Alexandra Cannizzaro (United Kingdom) Jessica Ren	6–4, 6–3
Loss	8.	6 June 2010	ITF Galatina, Italy	Clay	(Italy) Francesca Palmigiano	(Switzerland) Lisa Sabino (Bulgaria) Martina Gledacheva	4–6, 1–6
Loss	9.	5 July 2010	ITF Torino, Italy	Clay	(Italy) Martina Caciotti	(Italy) Elisa Balsamo (Italy) Valentina Sulpizio	5–7, 3–6
Loss	10.	16 August 2010	Internazionali di Todi, Italy	Clay	(Italy) Federica Grazioso	(Switzerland) Lisa Sabino (Italy) Maria Letizia Zavagli	6–0, 6–7^{(4)}, [8–10]
Win	8.	30 October 2010	ITF Vila Real de Santo António, Portugal	Clay	(Italy) Anastasia Grymalska	(France) Morgane Pons (France) Alice Tisset	6–2, 6–3
Win	9.	22 August 2011	ITF Bagnatica, Italy	Clay	(Italy) Benedetta Davato	(Australia) Stephanie Bengson (United States) Kirsten Flower	6–4, 6–7^{(8)}, [12–10]
Loss	11.	30 January 2012	ITF Mallorca, Spain	Clay	(Germany) Anne Schäfer	(Spain) Yvonne Cavallé Reimers (Spain) Lucia Cervera Vazquez	5–7, 4–6
Win	10.	16 July 2012	ITF Imola, Italy	Carpet	(Italy) Federica di Sarra	(Slovenia) Tadeja Majerič (Russia) Marina Melnikova	w/o
Loss	12.	6 August 2012	ITF Monteroni d'Arbia, Italy	Clay	(Italy) Karin Knapp	(Italy) Federica di Sarra (Italy) Anastasia Grymalska	4–6, 7–5, [7–10]
Win	11.	1 July 2013	ITF Todi, Italy	Clay	(Armenia) Ani Amiraghyan	(Italy) Claudia Giovine (Japan) Yuka Mori	6–2, 6–3
Win	12.	13 August 2013	ITF Craiova, Romania	Clay	(Poland) Katarzyna Kawa	(Romania) Diana Buzean (Germany) Christina Shakovets	3–6, 7–6, [10–8]
Win	13.	31 March 2014	ITF Pula, Italy	Clay	(Romania) Diana Buzean	(Argentina) Tatiana Búa (Spain) Inés Ferrer Suárez	3–6, 6–1, [10–1]
Loss	13.	7 April 2014	ITF Pula, Italy	Clay	(Romania) Diana Buzean	(Japan) Mana Ayukawa (Latvia) Jeļena Ostapenko	5–5, 6–3, [5–10]
Win	14.	8 August 2014	ITF Vienna, Austria	Clay	(Italy) Alice Savoretti	(Czech Republic) Kristýna Hrabalová (Czech Republic) Tereza Janatová	7–5, 6–0
Win	15.	13 September 2014	ITF Pula, Italy	Clay	(Italy) Angelica Moratelli	(Italy) Cristiana Ferrando (Italy) Stefania Rubini	6–1, 6–4
Win	16.	19 September 2014	ITF Pula, Italy	Clay	(Italy) Georgia Brescia	(Belgium) Marie Benoît (Belgium) Kimberley Zimmermann	3–6, 6–0, [10–5]
Win	17.	24 November 2014	ITF Sousse, Tunisia	Hard	(Italy) Martina Caregaro	(Ukraine) Oleksandra Korashvili (Serbia) Barbara Bonić	7–6^{(2)}, 6–4
Loss	14.	28 August 2015	ITF Bagnatica, Italy	Clay	(France) Shérazad Reix	(Italy) Anastasia Grymalska (Belarus) Ilona Kremen	4–6, 2–6
Loss	15.	18 September 2015	ITF Pula, Italy	Clay	(Italy) Camilla Scala	(Switzerland) Nina Stadler (Belgium) Kimberley Zimmermann	0–6, 1–6
Win	18.	3 October 2015	ITF Pula, Italy	Clay	(Italy) Martina di Giuseppe	(Italy) Corinna Dentoni (Italy) Anastasia Grymalska	w/o
Win	19.	16 October 2015	ITF Pula, Italy	Clay	(Italy) Valentine Confalonieri	(Belgium) Deborah Kerfs (Slovakia) Barbara Kotelesová	6–2, 6–4
Loss	16.	19 March 2016	ITF Hammamet, Tunisia	Clay	(Italy) Claudia Giovine	(Italy) Georgia Brescia (Greece) Despina Papamichail	6–4, 2–6, [7–10]
Win	20.	15 April 2016	ITF Pula, Italy	Clay	(Spain) Olga Parres Azcoitia	(Hungary) Vanda Lukacs (Slovakia) Kristína Schmiedlová	3–6, 6–2, [10–6]
Win	21.	17 June 2016	ITF Sassuolo, Italy	Clay	(Italy) Deborah Chiesa	(Italy) Tatiana Pieri (Italy) Lucrezia Stefanini	6–4, 6–2
Loss	17.	22 July 2016	ITF Schio, Italy	Clay	(Italy) Deborah Chiesa	(Chile) Bárbara Gatica (Colombia) María Fernanda Herazo	5–7, 6–1, [5–10]
Loss	18.	22 July 2016	ITF Pörtschach, Austria	Clay	(Italy) Marcella Cucca	(Austria) Natasha Bredl (Austria) Caroline Ilowska	6–3, 6–7^{(3)}, [6–10]
Loss	19.	23 September 2016	ITF Pula, Italy	Clay	(Italy) Marcella Cucca	(Italy) Tatiana Pieri (Italy) Lucrezia Stefanini	4–6, 0–6
Win	22.	8 April 2017	ITF Hammamet, Tunisia	Clay	(Italy) Giorgia Marchetti	(Chile) Fernanda Brito (Italy) Gaia Sanesi	2–6, 6–3, [10–2]
Loss	20.	8 September 2017	ITF Trieste, Italy	Clay	(Italy) Camilla Scala	(Italy) Martina Caregaro (Argentina) Paula Ormaechea	7–5, 5–7, [1–10]
