= Trofeul Popeci =

ITF Women's Tour
- Event name: Trofeul Popeci
- Location: Craiova, Romania
- Venue: Clubul Sportiv Popeci
- Category: ITF Women's Circuit $50,000+H
- Surface: Clay
- Draw: 32S/64Q/16D
- Prize money: $50,000+H
- Website: www.trofeulpopeci.ro

The Trofeul Popeci was a tournament for professional female tennis players played on outdoor clay courts. The event was classified as a $50,000+H ITF Women's Circuit tournament. It was annually held in Craiova, Romania, from 2007 to 2013. From 2007 until 2010 the tournament was classified as a $10,000 event on the ITF calendar. The last edition of the tournament was in 2013.

== Past finals ==
=== Singles ===
Year	Champion	Runner-up	Score
2013	(Slovakia) Kristína Kučová	(Italy) Alberta Brianti	7–5, 3–6, 6–4
2012	(Spain) María Teresa Torró Flor	(Romania) Andreea Mitu	6–3, 6–4
2011	(Romania) Mihaela Buzărnescu	(Italy) Annalisa Bona	6–2, 3–6, 6–4
2010	(Romania) Alexandra Cadanțu	(Romania) Mădălina Gojnea	5–7, 6–3, 6–0
2009	(Romania) Cristina Stancu	(Bulgaria) Tanya Germanlieva	6–4, 3–6, 6–2
2008	(Italy) Valentina Sulpizio	(Italy) Agnese Zucchini	6–2, 6–4
2007	(Argentina) Mailen Auroux	(Netherlands) Chayenne Ewijk	6–7^{(3–7)}, 6–2, 6–2

=== Doubles ===
Year	Champions	Runners-up	Score
2013	(Italy) Alice Balducci (Poland) Katarzyna Kawa	(Romania) Diana Buzean (Germany) Christina Shakovets	3–6, 7–6^{(7–3)}, [10–8]
2012	(Czech Republic) Renata Voráčová (Slovakia) Lenka Wienerová	(Poland) Paula Kania (Russia) Irina Khromacheva	2–6, 6–3, [10–6]
2011	(Romania) Diana Enache (Netherlands) Daniëlle Harmsen	(Romania) Elena Bogdan (Romania) Mihaela Buzărnescu	4–6, 7–6^{(7–5)}, [10–6]
2010	(Romania) Alexandra Cadanțu (Romania) Alexandra Damaschin	(Bulgaria) Tanya Germanlieva (Bulgaria) Dessislava Mladenova	6–3, 6–3
2009	(Bulgaria) Dessislava Mladenova (Bulgaria) Tanya Germanlieva	(Romania) Simona Matei (Serbia) Nataša Zorić	4–6, 6–1, [10–7]
2008	(Romania) Laura Ioana Andrei (Romania) Diana Enache	(Romania) Irina-Camelia Begu (Romania) Alexandra Damaschin	6–3, 6–1
2007	(Argentina) Andrea Benítez (Argentina) María Irigoyen	(Argentina) Mailen Auroux (Argentina) Vanesa Furlanetto	6–3, 6–4
