= Andreea Mitu =

Romanian tennis player

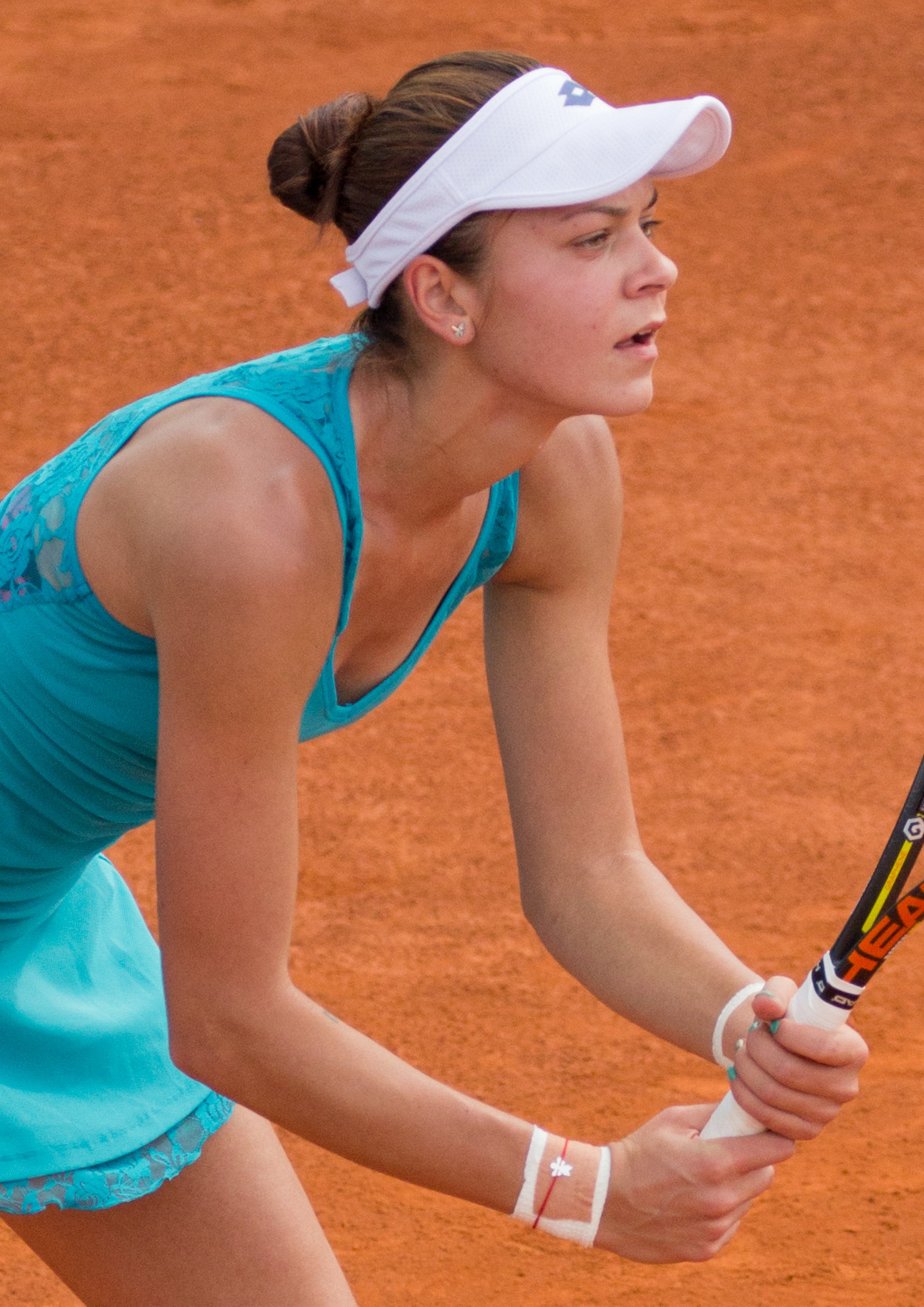
- Mitu at the 2015 Madrid Open
- Country (sports): Romania
- Born: 22 September 1991 (age 35) Bucharest, Romania
- Height: 1.75 m (5 ft 9 in)
- Plays: Right (two-handed backhand)
- Coach: Marius Cristian Onilă
- Prize money: US$ 1,010,100

Singles
- Career record: 410–229
- Career titles: 20 ITF
- Highest ranking: No. 68 (8 June 2015)

Grand Slam singles results
- Australian Open: 1R (2016)
- French Open: 4R (2015)
- Wimbledon: 1R (2014, 2015)
- US Open: 1R (2015)

Doubles
- Career record: 261–181
- Career titles: 4 WTA, 1 WTA Challenger
- Highest ranking: No. 69 (24 October 2016)

Grand Slam doubles results
- Australian Open: 2R (2021)
- French Open: 3R (2020)
- Wimbledon: 2R (2021)
- US Open: 2R (2021)

Team competitions
- Fed Cup: 1–3

Cristina-Andreea Mitu (born 22 September 1991) is an inactive tennis player from Romania.

She achieved her career-high singles ranking of 68 on 8 June 2015, and her highest doubles ranking of world No. 69 on 24 October 2016. Mitu is a member of the Romania Fed Cup team. On 19 April 2015, she beat then world No. 7 Eugenie Bouchard in a Fed Cup match.

== Personal life and background ==
She is coached by Adrian Marcu. Her parents are Petre and Ania. She also has a brother named Alex, who is a soccer player. She has an aggressive style of play. Andreea's favorite surface is hard (but loves grass too), while her favorite shot is forehand. She started playing tennis at age 7. Her tennis idols growing up were Jelena Dokic, Patty Schnyder, the Williams sisters, Jennifer Capriati and Martina Hingis. She also enjoys shopping, hanging out with friends and getting nails done. She stated that if weren't a tennis player, she would be a lawyer. In 2018, she gave birth to a son named Adam.

== Career ==
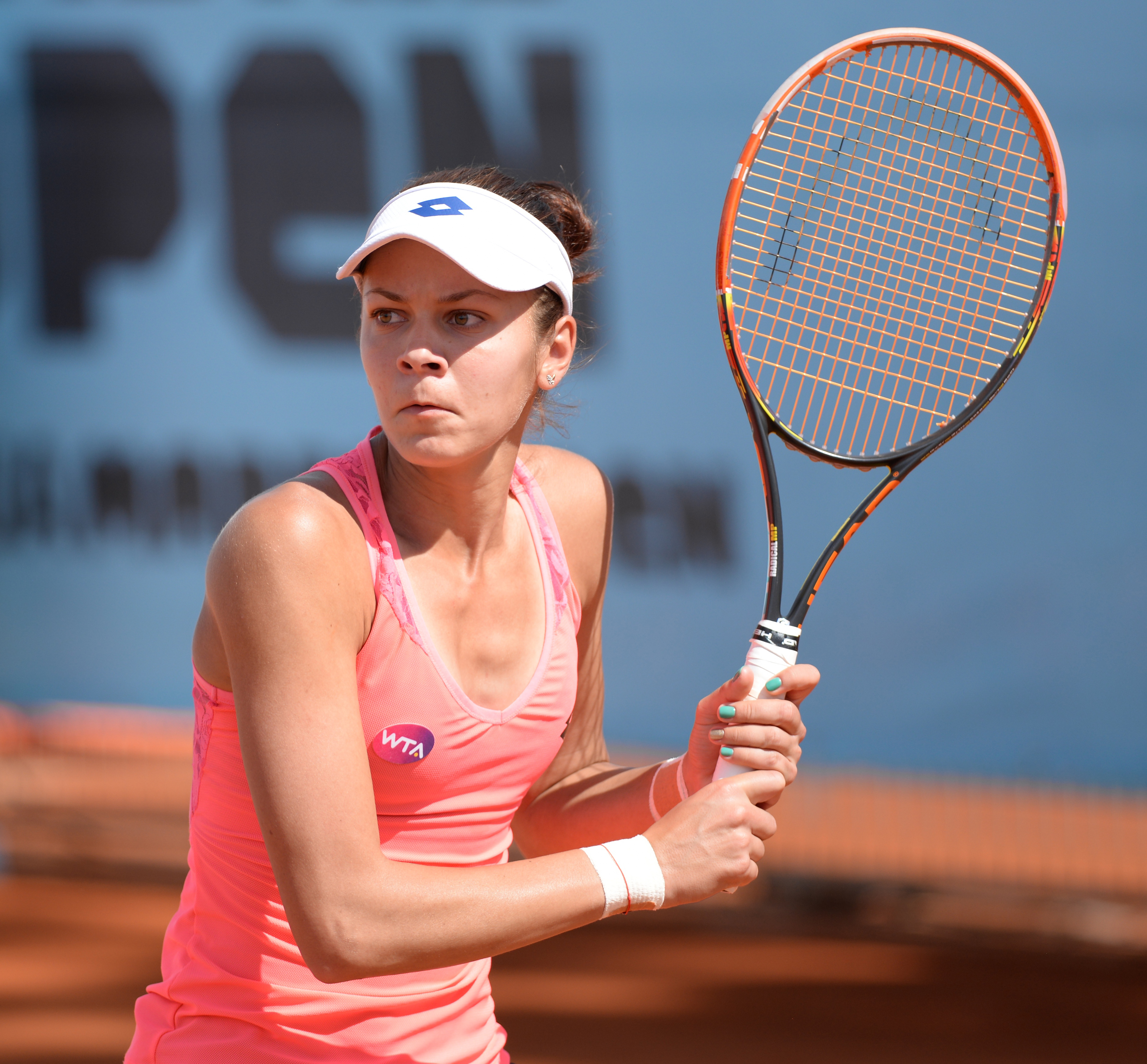
Mitu at the 2015 Madrid Open.

=== 2015-16: WTA Tour doubles titles, French Open singles 4th round ===
Not having won a single WTA Tour title, Mitu made it to the fourth round of 2015 French Open defeating world No. 12, Karolína Plíšková, in the second round, and former champion Francesca Schiavone in the third round. After this performance, Mitu rose to a career-high ranking of 68.

In 2016, Mitu won two WTA Tour doubles titles, in April the |İstanbul Cup with İpek Soylu, and in July the 2016 Swedish Open, where she trained up with Alicja Rosolska.

=== 2017-19: Motherhood, two more doubles titles ===
In 2017, Mitu took a break from competition: In January 2018, she became mother of a boy. In July 2018, she won the Bucharest Open doubles title partnering Irina-Camelia Begu. Alongside Sorana Cîrstea, she won her fourth WTA Tour doubles title at the 2019 Ladies Open Lugano.

=== 2020-21: Second and third round at majors ===
In 2020, she reached the third round at the French Open, with Patricia Tig, and in 2021, she reached second round at the Australian Open, with Raluca Olaru - her best major doubles performance so far.

== Performance timelines ==
Key
W	F	SF	QF	#R	RR	Q#	P#	DNQ	A	Z#	PO	G	S	B	NMS	NTI	P	NH

(W) winner; (F) finalist; (SF) semifinalist; (QF) quarterfinalist; (#R) rounds 4, 3, 2, 1; (RR) round-robin stage; (Q#) qualification round; (P#) preliminary round; (DNQ) did not qualify; (A) absent; (Z#) Davis/Fed Cup Zonal Group (with number indication) or (PO) play-off; (G) gold, (S) silver or (B) bronze Olympic/Paralympic medal; (NMS) not a Masters tournament; (NTI) not a Tier I tournament; (P) postponed; (NH) not held; (SR) strike rate (events won / competed); (W–L) win–loss record.
To avoid confusion and double counting, these charts are updated at the conclusion of a tournament or when the player's participation has ended.

=== Singles ===
Tournament	2012	2013	2014	2015	2016	...	2022	2023	2024	SR	W–L
Grand Slam tournaments
Australian Open	A	Q2	Q2	Q2	1R		A	A	Q1	0 / 1	0–1
French Open	A	Q2	Q1	4R	Q3		A	A	Q1	0 / 1	3–1
Wimbledon	A	Q2	1R	1R	Q2		A	A	Q1	0 / 2	0–2
US Open	Q2	Q2	Q1	1R	Q1		A	A	A	0 / 1	0–1
Win–loss	0–0	0–0	0–1	3–3	0–1		0–0	0–0	0–0	0 / 5	3–5
WTA 1000
Dubai / Qatar Ladies Open (Note: The first Premier 5 event of the year has switched back and forth between the Dubai Tennis Championships and the Qatar Ladies Open since 2009. Dubai was classified as a Premier 5 event from 2009 to 2011 before being succeeded by Doha for the 2012–2014 period. In 2015, Dubai regained its Premier 5 status while Doha was demoted to Premier status. The Premier 5 tournaments were reclassified as WTA 1000 tournaments in 2021.)	A	A	A	A	A		A	A	A	0 / 0	0–0
Indian Wells Open	A	A	A	A	A		A	A	A	0 / 0	0–0
Miami Open	A	A	A	Q1	A		A	A	A	0 / 0	0–0
Madrid Open	A	A	A	1R	A		A	A	A	0 / 1	0–1
Italian Open	A	A	A	A	A		A	A	A	0 / 0	0–0
Canadian Open	A	A	A	A	A		A	A	A	0 / 0	0–0
Cincinnati Open	A	A	A	Q1	A		A	A	A	0 / 0	0–0
Pan Pacific / Wuhan Open	A	A	A	A	A		A	A	A	0 / 0	0–0
China Open	A	A	A	A	A		A	A	A	0 / 0	0–0
Career statistics
Tournaments	0	0	2	15	8		0	0	0	25	
Overall win-loss	0–0	0–0	0–2	11–15	2–8		0–0	0–0	0–0	13–25	

=== Doubles ===
Tournament	2016	...	2019	2020	2021	2022	W–L
Grand Slam tournaments
Australian Open	A		A	A	2R	A	1–1
French Open	A		1R	3R	2R	A	3–3
Wimbledon	Q2		1R	NH	2R	A	1–2
US Open	1R		A	A	2R	A	1–2
Win–loss	0–1		0–2	2–1	4–4	0–0	6–8

== WTA Tour finals ==
=== Doubles: 5 (4 titles, 1 runner-up) ===
Legend WTA 250 (Note: The WTA International tournaments were reclassified as WTA 250 tournaments in 2021.) (4–1)	Finals by surface Clay (4–1)

Result	W–L	Date	Tournament	Tier	Surface	Partner	Opponents	Score
Loss	0–1	Jul 2015	Bucharest Open, Romania	International	Clay	(Romania) Patricia Maria Țig	(Georgia (country)) Oksana Kalashnikova (Netherlands) Demi Schuurs	2–6, 2–6
Win	1–1	Apr 2016	İstanbul Cup, Turkey	International	Clay	(Turkey) İpek Soylu	(Switzerland) Xenia Knoll (Montenegro) Danka Kovinić	w/o
Win	2–1	Jul 2016	Bastad Open, Sweden	International	Clay	(Poland) Alicja Rosolska	(Netherlands) Lesley Kerkhove (Belarus) Lidziya Marozava	6–3, 7–5
Win	3–1	Jul 2018	Bucharest Open, Romania	International	Clay	(Romania) Irina-Camelia Begu	(Montenegro) Danka Kovinić (Belgium) Maryna Zanevska	6–3, 6–4
Win	4–1	Apr 2019	Ladies Open Lugano, Switzerland	International	Clay	(Romania) Sorana Cîrstea	(Russia) Veronika Kudermetova (Kazakhstan) Galina Voskoboeva	1–6, 6–2, [10–8]

== WTA 125 finals ==
=== Doubles: 1 (title) ===
Result	W–L	Date	Tournament	Surface	Partner	Opponents	Score
Win	1–0	Sep 2020	Sparta Prague Open, Czech Republic	Clay	(Belarus) Lidziya Marozava	(Italy) Giulia Gatto-Monticone (Argentina) Nadia Podoroska	6–4, 6–4

== ITF Circuit finals ==
=== Singles: 34 (20 titles, 14 runner-ups) ===
Legend
$50/60,000 tournaments
$25,000 tournaments
$10/15,000 tournaments

Result	W–L	Date	Tournament	Tier	Surface	Opponent	Score
Loss	0–1	May 2007	ITF Bucharest, Romania	10,000	Clay	(Romania) Simona Halep	6–7^{(5)}, 0–6
Win	1–1	May 2007	ITF Galați, Romania	10,000	Clay	(Italy) Cristina Celani	6–0, 7–5
Loss	1–2	Jun 2007	ITF Pitești, Romania	10,000	Clay	(Russia) Natalia Orlova	6–4, 5–7, 5–7
Loss	1–3	Sep 2007	ITF Brașov, Romania	10,000	Clay	(Romania) Irina-Camelia Begu	6–7^{(2)}, 2–6
Win	2–3	Jul 2010	ITF Bucharest, Romania	10,000	Clay	(Romania) Elora Dabija	7–5, 7–5
Loss	2–4	Nov 2010	ITF Antalya, Turkey	10,000	Hard	(Uzbekistan) Vlada Ekshibarova	2–6, 6–4, 2–6
Loss	2–5	Aug 2011	ITF Bucharest, Romania	10,000	Clay	(Romania) Cristina Dinu	6–7^{(5)}, 4–6
Win	3–5	Sep 2011	ITF Mamaia, Romania	25,000	Clay	(Spain) Inés Ferrer Suárez	6–3, 6–0
Win	4–5	Feb 2012	ITF Antalya, Turkey	10,000	Clay	(Japan) Mana Ayukawa	6–3, 6–0
Win	5–5	May 2012	ITF Timișoara, Romania	10,000	Clay	(Slovakia) Viktória Maľová	6–2, 6–0
Win	6–5	Jun 2012	ITF Přerov, Czech Republic	10,000	Clay	(Czech Republic) Martina Kubičíková	6–2, 6–3
Loss	6–6	Jun 2012	ITF Craiova, Romania	50,000	Clay	(Spain) María Teresa Torró Flor	3–6, 4–6
Win	7–6	Sep 2012	ITF Sofia, Bulgaria	25,000	Clay	(Canada) Sharon Fichman	6–4, 3–6, 6–3
Win	8–6	Apr 2014	ITF Pula, Italy	10,000	Clay	(Spain) Sara Sorribes Tormo	6–4, 6–3
Win	9–6	Jul 2014	ITF Denain, France	25,000	Clay	(France) Fiona Ferro	4–6, 6–2, 6–1
Win	10–6	Jul 2014	ITF Darmstadt, Germany	25,000	Clay	(Switzerland) Viktorija Golubic	6–2, 6–1
Win	11–6	Aug 2014	ITF Mamaia, Romania	25,000	Clay	(Czech Republic) Tereza Martincová	6–2, 6–4
Win	12–6	Sep 2014	ITF Sofia, Bulgaria	25,000	Clay	(Russia) Victoria Kan	6–4, 4–6, 6–3
Loss	12–7	Sep 2014	ITF Dobrich, Bulgaria	25,000	Clay	(Russia) Evgeniya Rodina	6–3, 5–7, 3–6
Win	13–7	Sep 2014	Royal Cup, Montenegro	25,000	Clay	(Russia) Vitalia Diatchenko	6–1, 6–4
Loss	13–8	Feb 2015	ITF São Paulo, Brazil	25,000	Clay	(Spain) Laura Pous Tió	2–6, 2–6
Win	14–8	Feb 2015	ITF Campinas, Brazil	25,000	Clay	(Australia) Olivia Rogowska	6–3, 3–6, 6–2
Loss	14–9	Nov 2015	Open Nantes Atlantique, France	50,000	Hard (i)	(France) Mathilde Johansson	3−6, 4−6
Loss	14–10	Feb 2016	ITF São Paulo, Brazil	25,000	Clay	(Spain) Sara Sorribes Tormo	5–7, 1–6
Win	15–10	Nov 2016	Slovak Open, Slovakia	25,000	Hard (i)	(Czech Republic) Denisa Allertová	6–2, 6–3
Win	16–10	Mar 2017	ITF Antalya, Turkey	15,000	Clay	(Turkey) Ayla Aksu	6–2, 6–3
Loss	16–11	Jul 2018	ITF Curtea de Argeș, Romania	15,000	Clay	(Romania) Miriam Bulgaru	4–6, 5–7
Win	17–11	Jul 2018	ITF Focșani, Romania	15,000	Clay	(Romania) Oana Georgeta Simion	6–4, 6–4
Loss	17–12	Aug 2018	ITF Arad, Romania	15,000	Clay	(Bosnia and Herzegovina) Nefisa Berberović	3–6, 6–0, 4–6
Win	18–12	Aug 2019	ITF Wanfercée-Baulet, Belgium	15,000	Clay	(Austria) Sinja Kraus	6–4, 6–3
Loss	18–13	Sep 2019	ITF Focșani, Romania	15,000	Clay	(Germany) Laura Schaeder	2–6, 2–6
Win	19–13	Sep 2019	ITF Arad, Romania	25,000	Clay	(Spain) Irene Burillo	6–7^{(5)}, 6–4, 6–4
Win	20–13	Sep 2023	Prague Open, Czech Republic	60,000	Clay	(Czech Republic) Sára Bejlek	7–6^{(1)}, 2–6, 6–3
Loss	20–14	Oct 2023	ITF Heraklion, Greece	25,000	Clay	(Romania) Irina Bara	2–6, 1–6

=== Doubles: 39 (25 titles, 14 runner-ups) ===
Legend
$100,000 tournaments
$50/60,000 tournaments
$40,000 tournaments
$25,000 tournaments
$10/15,000 tournaments

Result	W–L	Date	Tournament	Tier	Surface	Partner	Opponents	Score
Loss	0–1	Aug 2008	ITF Arad, Romania	10,000	Clay	(Romania) Elora Dabija	(Romania) Laura Ioana Andrei (Romania) Diana Enache	6–2, 2–6, [6–10]
Loss	0–2	Dec 2008	ITF Benicarló, Spain	10,000	Clay	(Romania) Simona Matei	(Serbia) Neda Kozić (Bulgaria) Biljana Pavlova	4–6, 6–7^{(3)}
Loss	0–3	May 2009	ITF Pitești, Romania	10,000	Clay	(Romania) Diana Enache	(Romania) Alexandra Damaschin (Romania) Camelia Hristea	1–6, 4–6
Loss	0–4	Jun 2009	ITF Bucharest, Romania	10,000	Clay	(Romania) Simona Matei	(Romania) Laura Ioana Andrei (Romania) Ioana Gaspar	3–6, 6–7^{(3)}
Loss	0–5	Jul 2009	ITF Bucharest, Romania	10,000	Clay	(Romania) Ionela Andreea Iova	(Romania) Ioana Gaspar (Romania) Simona Matei	6–7^{(6)}, 1–6
Win	1–5	Aug 2009	ITF Arad, Romania	10,000	Clay	(Romania) Diana Enache	(Romania) Ionela Andreea Iova (Romania) Ioana Ivan	6–3, 7–5
Win	2–5	Mar 2010	ITF Antalya, Turkey	10,000	Clay	(Romania) Diana Enache	(Italy) Evelyn Mayr (Italy) Julia Mayr	6–7^{(3)}, 6–1, [11–9]
Loss	2–6	May 2010	ITF Bucharest, Romania	10,000	Clay	(Romania) Diana Enache	(Romania) Laura Ioana Andrei (Romania) Mădălina Gojnea	4–6, 6–3, [7–10]
Win	3–6	Jul 2010	ITF Bucharest, Romania	10,000	Clay	(Romania) Diana Enache	(Bulgaria) Dessislava Mladenova (Bulgaria) Dalia Zafirova	6–3, 6–1
Loss	3–7	Aug 2011	ITF Bucharest, Romania	10,000	Clay	(Romania) Alexandra Damaschin	(Romania) Cristina Dinu (Romania) Camelia Hristea	6–1, 6–7^{(6)}, [4–10]
Win	4–7	Oct 2011	ITF Dobrich, Bulgaria	25,000	Clay	(Romania) Diana Marcu	(Romania) Laura Ioana Andrei (Romania) Cristina Dinu	4–6, 6–3, [10–6]
Win	5–7	Jan 2012	ITF Antalya, Turkey	10,000	Clay	(Romania) Cristina Dinu	(Romania) Diana Marcu (Romania) Liana Ungur	7–6^{(3)}, 6–2
Win	6–7	Jan 2012	ITF Antalya, Turkey	10,000	Clay	(Romania) Cristina Dinu	(Japan) Yumi Nakano (Russia) Ekaterina Yashina	w/o
Win	7–7	May 2012	ITF Timișoara, Romania	10,000	Clay	(Serbia) Teodora Mirčić	(North Macedonia) Lina Gjorcheska (Bulgaria) Dalia Zafirova	6–1, 6–2
Loss	7–8	Nov 2013	Kemer Cup Istanbul, Turkey	50,000	Hard (i)	(Slovenia) Tadeja Majerič	(Uzbekistan) Nigina Abduraimova (Italy) Maria Elena Camerin	3–6, 6–2, [8–10]
Win	8–8	Apr 2014	ITF Pula, Italy	10,000	Clay	(Romania) Stefana Andrei	(France) Audrey Albié (France) Manon Peral	7–6^{(5)}, 6–2
Win	9–8	Aug 2014	ITF Mamaia, Romania	25,000	Clay	(Romania) Irina Bara	(Romania) Georgia Crăciun (Romania) Patricia Maria Țig	6–4, 6–1
Win	10–8	Sep 2014	ITF Dobrich, Bulgaria	25,000	Clay	(Romania) Irina Bara	(Hungary) Réka Luca Jani (Bulgaria) Isabella Shinikova	7–5, 7–6
Win	11–8	Feb 2015	ITF São Paulo, Brazil	25,000	Clay	(Montenegro) Danka Kovinić	(Argentina) Tatiana Búa (Brazil) Paula Cristina Gonçalves	6–2, 7–5
Win	12–8	Oct 2015	Internationaux de Poitiers, France	100,000	Hard (i)	(Romania) Monica Niculescu	(France) Stéphanie Foretz (France) Amandine Hesse	6–7^{(5)}, 7–6^{(2)}, [10–8]
Win	13–8	May 2016	Open de Cagnes-sur-Mer, France	100,000	Clay	(Netherlands) Demi Schuurs	(Switzerland) Xenia Knoll (Serbia) Aleksandra Krunić	6–4, 7–5
Win	14–8	Jul 2018	ITF Curtea de Argeș, Romania	15,000	Clay	(United States) Elizabeth Mandlik	(Italy) Anna Turati (Italy) Bianca Turati	6–4, 7–5
Win	15–8	Jul 2018	ITF Focșani, Romania	15,000	Clay	(Romania) Oana Georgeta Simion	(Romania) Selma Stefania Cadar (Russia) Anastasia Kharitonova	4–6, 6–2, [10–6]
Win	16–8	Sep 2018	Montreux Ladies Open, Switzerland	60,000	Clay	(Romania) Elena-Gabriela Ruse	(Brazil) Laura Pigossi (Belgium) Maryna Zanevska	4–6, 6–3, [10–4]
Win	17–8	Nov 2018	ITF Pula, Italy	25,000	Clay	(Romania) Cristina Dinu	(Italy) Federica di Sarra (Italy) Anastasia Grymalska	w/o
Loss	17–9	Jan 2019	Open Andrézieux-Bouthéon, France	60,000	Hard (i)	(Romania) Elena-Gabriela Ruse	(Sweden) Cornelia Lister (Czech Republic) Renata Voráčová	1–6, 2–6
Loss	17–10	Feb 2019	Open de l'Isère, France	25,000	Hard (i)	(Romania) Elena-Gabriela Ruse	(France) Estelle Cascino (France) Elixane Lechemia	2–6, 2–6
Loss	17–11	Sep 2019	ITF Focșani, Romania	15,000	Clay	(Romania) Gabriela Nicole Tătăruș	(Romania) Oana Gavrilă (Romania) Andreea Roșca	6–1, 2–6, [4–10]
Win	18–11	Sep 2019	ITF Arad, Romania	25,000	Clay	(Turkey) Başak Eraydın	(Romania) Oana Gavrilă (Romania) Andreea Roșca	6–0, 6–1
Win	19–11	Feb 2020	AK Ladies Open, Germany	W25	Carpet (i)	(Romania) Laura Ioana Paar	(United Kingdom) Anna Popescu (United States) Chiara Scholl	7–5, 6–2
Win	20–11	Apr 2021	Oeiras Ladies Open, Portugal	W60	Clay	(Belarus) Lidziya Marozava	(Russia) Marina Melnikova (Switzerland) Conny Perrin	3–6, 6–4, [10–3]
Win	21–11	Feb 2022	ITF Mâcon, France	W25	Hard (i)	(Switzerland) Xenia Knoll	(United Kingdom) Emily Appleton (United Kingdom) Ali Collins	6–1, 6–1
Loss	21–12	Mar 2023	Branik Maribor Open, Slovenia	W40	Hard (i)	(Romania) Irina Bara	Sofya Lansere; Anastasia Tikhonova	3–6, 2–6
Win	22–12	Apr 2023	Murska Sobota Open, Slovenia	W40	Hard	(United Kingdom) Harriet Dart	(Belgium) Magali Kempen (Switzerland) Xenia Knoll	w/o
Loss	22–13	Apr 2023	Chiasso Open, Switzerland	W60	Clay	(Argentina) Nadia Podoroska	(United Kingdom) Emily Appleton (Germany) Julia Lohoff	1–6, 2–6
Win	23–13	Apr 2023	Koper Open, Slovenia	W60	Clay	(Romania) Irina Bara	(Netherlands) Suzan Lamens (Australia) Kaylah McPhee	6–2, 6–3
Loss	23–14	Jul 2023	Montpellier Open, France	W60	Clay	(Germany) Julia Lohoff	Amina Anshba; Sofya Lansere	3–6, 4–6
Win	24–14	Nov 2023	Open de Valencia, Spain	W100	Clay	(Greece) Valentini Grammatikopoulou	(Spain) Aliona Bolsova (Georgia (country)) Natela Dzalamidze	7–5, 6–4
Win	25–14	Jun 2024	Open de Biarritz, France	W100	Clay	(Romania) Irina Bara	(France) Estelle Cascino (France) Carole Monnet	6–3, 3–6, [10–7]

== Head-to-head record ==
=== Record against top 10 players ===
Mitu's win–loss record against certain players who have been ranked world No. 10 or higher is as follows:

Player	Record	Win %	Hard	Clay	Grass	Last match
No. 1 ranked players						
(Czech Republic) Karolína Plíšková	1–0	100%	–	1–0	–	Won (2–6, 7–6^{(7–5)}, 6–4) at 2015 French Open
(Spain) Garbiñe Muguruza	1–1	50%	0–1	1–0	–	Loss (2–6, 2–6) at 2016 Summer Olympics
(Romania) Simona Halep	0–2	0%	–	0–2	–	Loss (0–6, 3–6) at 2008 ITF Bucharest
No. 2 ranked players						
(Poland) Agnieszka Radwańska	0–1	0%	–	–	0–1	Loss (2–6, 1–6) at 2014 Wimbledon
No. 4 ranked players						
(Japan) Kimiko Date-Krumm	0–1	67%	0–1	–	–	Loss (3–6, 6–1, 0–6) at 2014 Dubai Challenge
(Italy) Francesca Schiavone	1–0	100%	–	1–0	–	Won (7–5, 6–4) at 2015 French Open
No. 5 ranked players						
(Canada) Eugenie Bouchard	1–0	50%	1–0	–	–	Won (4–6, 6–4, 6–1) at 2015 Fed Cup
(Czech Republic) Lucie Šafářová	1–1	50%	–	1–1	–	Won (6–3, 6–4) at 2015 Linz Open
No. 7 ranked players						
(United States) Madison Keys	0–1	0%	–	0–1	–	Loss (2–6, 0–6) at 2015 Charleston
Total	5–6	45%	2–2	3–3	0–1	–

=== Top 10 wins ===
#	Player	Rank	Event	Surface	Round	Score
2015
1.	(Canada) Eugenie Bouchard	No. 7	Fed Cup, Canada	Hard	Play-offs	4–6, 6–4, 6–1
2.	(Czech Republic) Lucie Šafářová	No. 7	Linz Open, Austria	Hard (i)	1st	6–3, 6–4
