= Lenka Wienerová =

Slovak tennis player

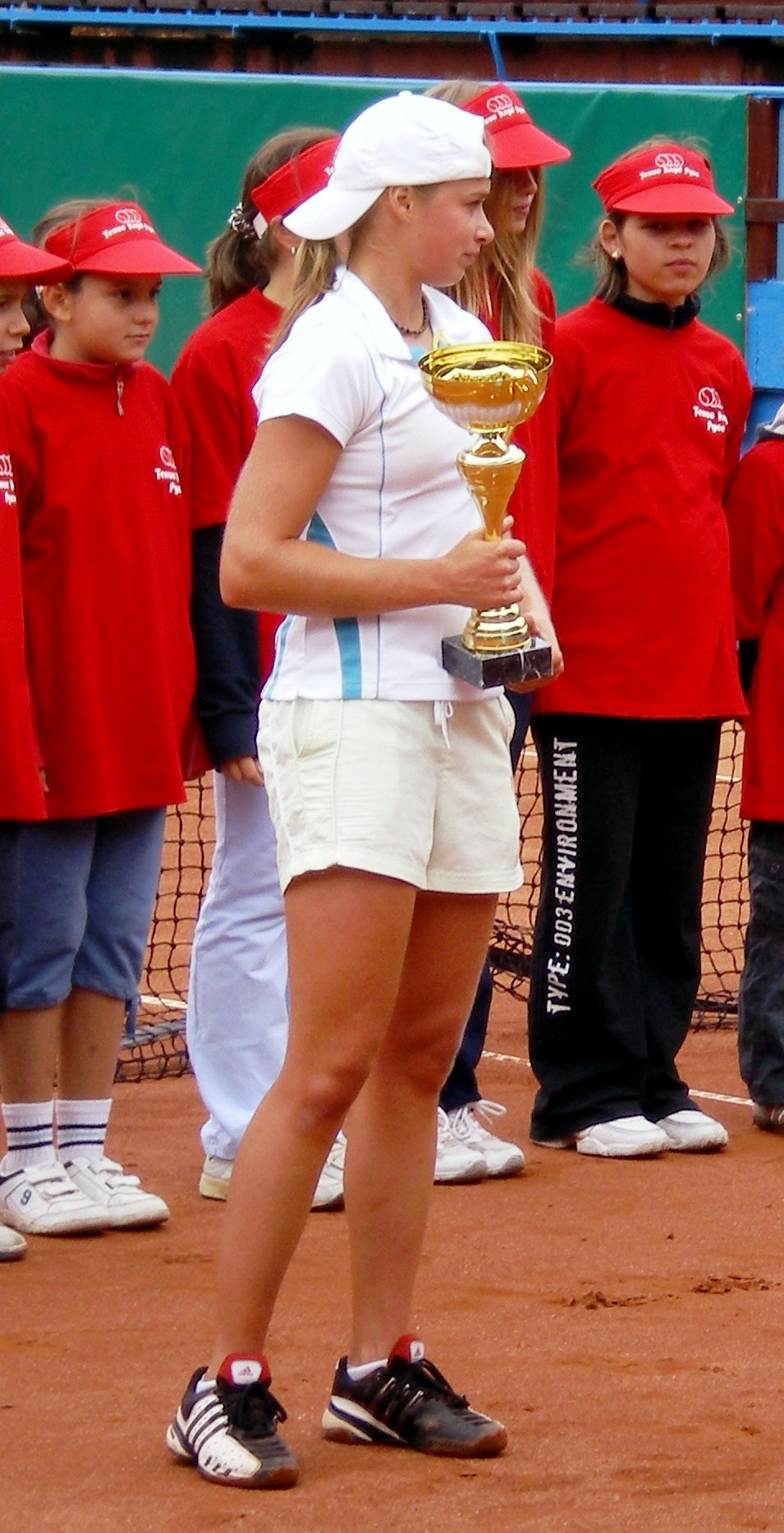
- Lenka Wienerová at the 2008 Ruse Open in Bulgaria
- Country (sports): Slovakia
- Born: 23 April 1988 (age 37) Košice, Czechoslovakia
- Height: 1.64 m (5 ft 5 in)
- Plays: Right (two-handed backhand)
- Prize money: $194,096

Singles
- Career record: 254–226
- Career titles: 10 ITF
- Highest ranking: No. 128 (10 August 2009)

Grand Slam singles results
- Australian Open: Q3 (2009)
- French Open: Q2 (2009)
- Wimbledon: Q1 (2009, 2011)
- US Open: Q1 (2009, 2011)

Doubles
- Career record: 153–134
- Career titles: 11 ITF
- Highest ranking: No. 158 (2 April 2012)

Lenka Wienerová (born 23 April 1988) is a Slovak former tennis player.

Wienerová won ten titles in singles and eleven in doubles on the ITF Circuit in her career. On 10 August 2009, she reached her best singles ranking of world No. 128. On 2 April 2012, she peaked at No. 158 in the doubles rankings.

Playing for Slovakia in Fed Cup, she has a win-loss record of 1–1.

== ITF Circuit finals ==
$100,000 tournaments
$75,000 tournaments
$50,000 tournaments
$25,000 tournaments
$10,000 tournaments

=== Singles (10–9) ===
Result	No.	Date	Tournament	Surface	Opponent	Score
Win	1.	18 April 2006	ITF Bol, Croatia	Clay	(Bosnia and Herzegovina) Dijana Stojić	6–2, 6–0
Loss	1.	17 July 2006	ITF Zwevegem, Belgium	Clay	(Lithuania) Lina Stančiūtė	1–6, 2–6
Loss	2.	28 August 2006	ITF Vienna, Austria	Clay	(Bosnia and Herzegovina) Sandra Martinović	w/o
Win	2.	29 May 2007	Macha Lake Open, Czech Republic	Clay	(Germany) Kristina Steiert	6–4, 6–2
Win	3.	19 June 2007	ITF Alkmaar, Netherlands	Clay	(Poland) Olga Brózda	6–3, 4–6, 6–4
Loss	3.	16 July 2007	ITF Zwevegem, Belgium	Clay	(Czech Republic) Petra Cetkovská	1–6, 7–5, 0–6
Win	4.	13 August 2007	ITF Koksijde, Belgium	Clay	(France) Claire de Gubernatis	6–1, 6–4
Loss	4.	12 May 2008	ITF Szczecin, Poland	Clay	(Czech Republic) Barbora Záhlavová-Strýcová	4–6, 2–6
Win	5.	11 August 2008	Palić Open, Serbia	Clay	(Hungary) Katalin Marosi	7–5, 7–6^{6}
Win	6.	25 August 2008	ITF Katowice, Poland	Clay	(Latvia) Anastasija Sevastova	6–3, 6–2
Win	7.	8 September 2008	Ruse Open, Bulgaria	Clay	(Russia) Ksenia Pervak	6–4, 6–4
Win	8.	29 June 2009	ITF Ystad, Sweden	Clay	(Austria) Melanie Klaffner	6–1, 7–6^{3}
Win	9.	26 June 2010	ITF Kristinehamn, Sweden	Clay	(United States) Jacqueline Cako	6–2, 3–6, 7–6^{2}
Loss	5.	20 February 2011	ITF Surprise, United States	Hard	(Puerto Rico) Monica Puig	4–6, 0–6
Loss	6.	18 July 2011	ITF Wrexham, Wales	Hard	(Germany) Sarah Gronert	4–6, 4–6
Loss	7.	12 February 2012	ITF Rancho Mirage, United States	Hard	(United Kingdom) Johanna Konta	0–6, 4–6
Win	10.	23 February 2014	ITF Antalya, Turkey	Clay	(China) Zhu Lin	5–7, 6–4, 6–4
Loss	8.	14 June 2015	ITF Adana, Turkey	Clay	(Switzerland) Lisa Sabino	2–6, 1–6
Loss	9.	21 June 2015	ITF Tarsus, Turkey	Clay	(North Macedonia) Lina Gjorcheska	2–6, 4–6

=== Doubles (11–15) ===
Result	No.	Date	Tournament	Surface	Partner	Opponents	Score
Win	1.	19 September 2005	ITF Ciampino, Italy	Clay	(Slovakia) Lenka Broošová	(Italy) Raffaella Bindi (Italy) Annalisa Bona	6–4, 6–4
Loss	1.	17 October 2005	ITF Dubrovnik, Croatia	Clay	(Slovakia) Lenka Broošová	(Serbia) Vanja Ćorović (Slovenia) Tina Obrez	4–6, 2–6
Win	2.	25 August 2008	ITF Katowice, Poland	Clay	(Latvia) Anastasija Sevastova	(Poland) Karolina Kosińska (Poland) Aleksandra Rosolska	5–7, 6–3, [10–3]
Loss	2.	22 March 2010	ITF Namangan, Uzbekistan	Hard	(Poland) Karolina Kosińska	(Ukraine) Kristina Antoniychuk (Russia) Ksenia Lykina	3–6, 7–5, [8–10]
Loss	3.	12 April 2010	ITF Cairo, Egypt	Clay	(Belarus) Ksenia Milevskaya	(Czech Republic) Eva Birnerová (Czech Republic) Renata Voráčová	6–7^{4}, 4–6
Win	3.	7 June 2010	ITF Budapest, Hungary	Clay	(Serbia) Teodora Mirčić	(Germany) Anna Livadaru (Argentina) Florencia Molinero	6–0, 6–2
Loss	4.	9 August 2010	Empire Slovak Open, Slovakia	Clay	(Slovakia) Michaela Hončová	(Czech Republic) Iveta Gerlová (Czech Republic) Lucie Kriegsmannová	2–6, 1–6
Win	4.	18 April 2011	ITF Dothan, United States	Clay	(Russia) Valeria Solovyeva	(Canada) Heidi El Tabakh (United States) Alison Riske	6–3, 6–4
Win	5.	2 May 2011	ITF Indian Harbour Beach, United States	Clay	(Ukraine) Alyona Sotnikova	(United States) Christina Fusano (United States) Alexa Glatch	6–4, 6–3
Win	6.	11 July 2011	ITF Zwevegem, Belgium	Clay	(Ukraine) Maryna Zanevska	(Netherlands) Kim Kilsdonk (Netherlands) Nicolette van Uitert	6–4, 3–6, [10–7]
Loss	5.	18 July 2011	ITF Wrexham, Wales	Hard	(United Kingdom) Melanie South	(United Kingdom) Anna Fitzpatrick (United Kingdom) Jade Windley	2–6, 6–4, 4–6
Loss	6.	1 August 2011	Empire Slovak Open, Slovakia	Hard	(Slovakia) Jana Čepelová	(Slovakia) Janette Husárová (Czech Republic) Renata Voráčová	6–7, 1–6
Loss	7.	6 February 2012	ITF Rancho Mirage, U.S.	Hard	(Russia) Valeria Solovyeva	(Georgia (country)) Ekaterine Gorgodze (Georgia (country)) Sofia Shapatava	2–6, 6–3, [6–10]
Win	7.	12 March 2012	ITF Poza Rica, Mexico	Hard	(Slovakia) Jana Čepelová	(Italy) Maria Elena Camerin (Ukraine) Mariya Koryttseva	7–5, 2–6, [10–3]
Win	8.	11 June 2012	ITF Craiova, Romania	Clay	(Czech Republic) Renata Voráčová	(Poland) Paula Kania (Russia) Irina Khromacheva	2–6, 6–3, [10–6]
Loss	8.	25 June 2012	ITF Ystad, Sweden	Hard	(Georgia (country)) Oksana Kalashnikova	(Poland) Magda Linette (Poland) Katarzyna Piter	3–6, 3–6
Win	9.	23 July 2012	ITF Wrexham, Wales	Hard	(Austria) Nicole Rottmann	(Japan) Yuka Higuchi (Japan) Hirono Watanabe	6–1, 6–1
Loss	9.	25 November 2013	ITF Monterrey, U.S.	Hard	(Netherlands) Indy de Vroome	(Argentina) Florencia Molinero (Brazil) Laura Pigossi	5–7, 5–7
Loss	10.	1 August 2014	ITF Michalovce, Slovakia	Hard	(Netherlands) Anna Katalina Alzate Esmurzaeva	(Czech Republic) Karolína Čechová (Czech Republic) Nikola Horáková	6–7, 3–6
Loss	11.	9 August 2014	Telavi Open, Georgia	Clay	(Belgium) India Maggen	(Lithuania) Justina Mikulskytė (Lithuania) Agnė Čepelytė	1–6, 5–7
Loss	12.	22 September 2014	ITF Juárez, Mexico	Clay	(Romania) Ioana Loredana Roșca	(Colombia) Mariana Duque (Brazil) Laura Pigossi	1–6, 6–3, [4–10]
Loss	13.	25 October 2014	ITF Victoria, Mexico	Hard	(Mexico) Carolina Betancourt	(Romania) Patricia Maria Țig (Brazil) Maria Fernanda Alves	1–6, 2–6
Loss	14.	11 January 2015	ITF Antalya, Turkey	Hard	(Germany) Anne Schäfer	(Bosnia and Herzegovina) Anita Husarić (United States) Danielle Mills	4–6, 6–4, [10–12]
Win	10.	18 January 2015	ITF Antalya, Turkey	Hard	(Germany) Anne Schäfer	(France) Audrey Albié (France) Alice Bacquié	6–4, 6–4
Win	11.	28 February 2015	ITF Antalya, Turkey	Clay	(Turkey) Melis Sezer	(Russia) Polina Novoselova (Belarus) Iryna Shymanovich	6–2, 6–2
Loss	15.	1 August 2015	ITF Tunis, Tunisia	Clay	(Germany) Alina Wessel	(Bosnia and Herzegovina) Jelena Simić (Argentina) Sofia Luini	6–7^{5}, 6–3, [8–10]
