= Inés Ferrer Suárez =

Spanish tennis player (born 1990)

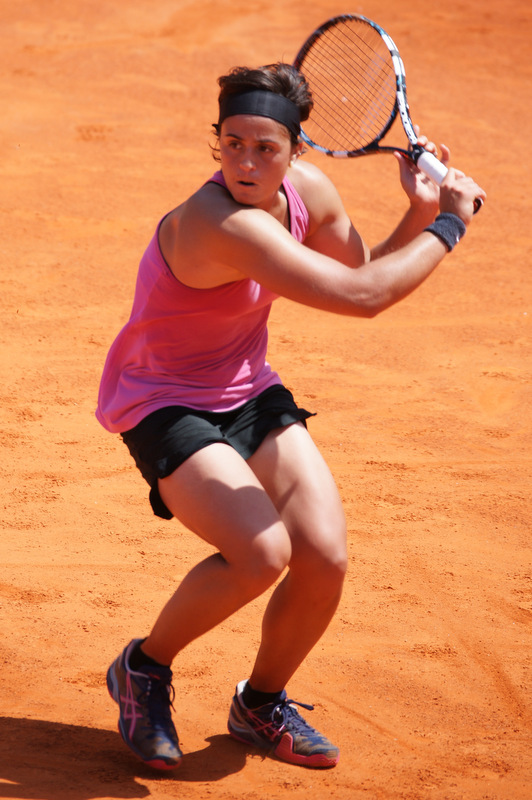
- Inés Ferrer Suárez in 2013
- Country (sports): Spain
- Born: 1 June 1990 (age 34)
- Turned pro: 2006
- Plays: Right (two-handed backhand)
- Prize money: US$ 120,897

Singles
- Career record: 225–192
- Career titles: 2 ITF
- Highest ranking: No. 202 (9 July 2012)

Grand Slam singles results
- Australian Open: Q1 (2013)
- Wimbledon: Q2 (2012)
- US Open: Q1 (2012)

Doubles
- Career record: 141–105
- Career titles: 9 ITF
- Highest ranking: No. 125 (17 September 2012)

Inés Ferrer Suárez (Spanish pronunciation: [iˈnes feˈreɾ ˈswaɾeθ]; born 1 June 1990) is a Spanish former professional tennis player.

Ferrer Suárez won two singles and nine doubles titles on the ITF Women's Circuit in her career. On 9 July 2012, she reached her highest singles ranking of 202 WTA whilst her best doubles ranking was 125, on 17 September 2012.

Ferrer Suárez made her WTA Tour main-draw debut at the 2012 Copa Colsanitas, where she qualified for the singles tournament.

== ITF finals ==
=== Singles (2–5) ===
Legend $25,000 tournaments $10,000 tournaments	Finals by surface Hard (0–0) Clay (2–5)

Outcome	No.	Date	Tournament	Surface	Opponent	Score
Runner-up	1.	4 February 2008	Mallorca, Spain	Clay	(Slovenia) Polona Hercog	3–6, 1–6
Winner	2.	May 31, 2009	Tortosa, Spain	Clay	(Spain) Yera Campos Molina	7–5, 4–6, 6–3
Winner	3.	27 November 2010	Asunción, Paraguay	Clay	(Spain) Eva Fernández Brugués	6–2, 6–2
Runner-up	4.	16 May 2011	Santa Coloma de Farners, Spain	Clay	(Switzerland) Viktorija Golubic	3–6, 3–6
Runner-up	5.	4 September 2011	Mamaia, Romania	Clay	(Romania) Andreea Mitu	3–6, 0–6
Runner-up	6.	February 24, 2014	Mallorca, Spain	Clay	(Spain) Julia Payola	5–7, 4–6
Runner-up	7.	April 7, 2014	Pula, Italy	Clay	(Italy) Alice Balducci	7–6, 6–1, 0–6

=== Doubles (9–21) ===
Legend $100,000 tournaments $75,000 tournaments $50,000 tournaments $25,000 tournaments $10,000 tournaments	Finals by surface Hard (1–2) Clay (8–19) Grass (0–0) Carpet (0–0)

Outcome	No.	Date	Tournament	Surface	Partner	Opponents	Score
Runner-up	1.	July 19, 2009	Cáceres, Spain	Hard	(Spain) Yera Campos Molina	(Argentina) Tatiana Búa (Spain) Carmen Lopez-Rueda	3–6, 2–6
Runner-up	2.	September 5, 2009	Mollerussa, Spain	Hard	(Argentina) Tatiana Búa	(Spain) Lara Arruabarrena (Spain) Carla Roset-Franco	3–6, 6–2 [6–10]
Runner-up	3.	November 15, 2009	Mallorca, Spain	Clay	(Spain) Leticia Costas	(Switzerland) Romina Oprandi (Spain) Laura Pous Tió	6–7, 2–6
Runner-up	4.	February 14, 2010	Mallorca, Spain	Clay	(Italy) Benedetta Davato	(Georgia (country)) Sofia Kvatsabaia (Russia) Avgusta Tsybysheva	6–7 4–6
Runner-up	5.	February 28, 2010	Madrid, Spain	Clay	(Italy) Benedetta Davato	(Italy) Giulia Gatto-Monticone (Italy) Federica Quercia	7–5, 4–6 [6–10]
Winner	6.	3 July 2010	Mont-de-Marsan, France	Clay	(Spain) Lara Arruabarrena	(Ukraine) Nadiia Kichenok (France) Constance Sibille	6–3, 6–1
Runner-up	7.	July 24, 2010	A Coruña, Spain	Clay	(Spain) Leticia Costas	(Australia) Jade Hopper (France) Victoria Larrière	6–7, 1–6
Winner	8.	6 November 2010	Mallorca, Spain	Clay	(Spain) Lara Arruabarrena	(Portugal) Maria João Koehler (Russia) Avgusta Tsybysheva	7–5, 6–2
Winner	9.	21 May 2011	Santa Coloma de Farners, Spain	Clay	(Spain) Eva Fernández Brugués	(Switzerland) Viktorija Golubic (Germany) Nina Zander	6–3, 6–7^{(3)}, [10–4]
Runner-up	10.	June 17, 2011	Montpellier, France	Clay	(Romania) Mădălina Gojnea	(Brazil) Paula Cristina Gonçalves (Ukraine) Maryna Zanevska	4–6, 5–7
Runner-up	11.	June 25, 2011	Périgueux, France	Clay	(Spain) Leticia Costas	(Argentina) Florencia Molinero (Japan) Erika Sema	2–6, 6–3 [7–10]
Runner-up	12.	July 24, 2011	A Coruña, Spain	Clay	(Spain) Leticia Costas	(Hungary) Tímea Babos (France) Victoria Larriere	5–7, 3–6
Runner-up	13.	September 23, 2011	Foggia, Italy	Clay	(Spain) Leticia Costas	(Slovakia) Janette Husárová (Czech Republic) Renata Voráčová	1–6, 2–6
Runner-up	14.	October 14, 2011	Sant Cugat del Valles, Spain	Clay	(Spain) Leticia Costas	(Slovakia) Jana Čepelová (Poland) Katarzyna Piter	3–6, 6–2 [6–10]
Runner-up	15.	October 23, 2011	Seville, Spain	Clay	(Spain) Leticia Costas	(Spain) Lara Arruabarrena (Spain) Estrella Cabeza Candela	4–6, 4–6
Winner	16.	7 November 2011	Benicarló, Spain	Clay	(Netherlands) Richèl Hogenkamp	(Russia) Ekaterina Lopes (Bulgaria) Aleksandrina Naydenova	7–6^{(6)}, 6–4
Runner-up	17.	28 November 2011	Rosario, Argentine	Clay	(Netherlands) Richèl Hogenkamp	(Argentina) Mailen Auroux (Argentina) María Irigoyen	4–6, 6–1, 6–3
Winner	18.	12 December 2011	Santiago, Chile	Clay	(Netherlands) Richèl Hogenkamp	(Argentina) Mailen Auroux (Argentina) María Irigoyen	6–4, 3–6, [10–5]
Runner-up	19.	April 28, 2012	Tunis, Tunisia	Clay	(Netherlands) Richèl Hogenkamp	(Romania) Elena Bogdan (Romania) Raluca Olaru	4–6, 3–6
Runner-up	20.	June 30, 2012	Périgueux, France	Clay	(Spain) Leticia Costas	(Argentina) Mailen Auroux (Argentina) María Irigoyen	1–6, 2–6
Winner	21.	29 July 2012	Olomouc, Czech Republic	Clay	(Netherlands) Richèl Hogenkamp	(Ukraine) Yuliya Beygelzimer (Czech Republic) Renata Voráčová	6–2, 7–6^{(4)}
Runner-up	22.	October 11, 2012	Sant Cugat del Valles, Spain	Clay	(Netherlands) Richèl Hogenkamp	(Spain) Leticia Costas (Czech Republic) Arantxa Parra Santonja	3–6, 3–6
Runner-up	23.	25 March 2013	Osprey, United States	Clay	(Paraguay) Verónica Cepede Royg	(United States) Raquel Kops-Jones (United States) Abigail Spears	1–6, 3–6
Runner-up	24.	June 23, 2013	Montpellier, France	Clay	(Brazil) Paula Cristina Gonçalves	(Russia) Irina Khromacheva (Czech Republic) Renata Voráčová	1–6, 4–6
Runner-up	25.	September 1, 2013	Mamaia, Romania	Clay	(Romania) Diana Buzean	(Kazakhstan) Kamila Kerimbayeva (Germany) Christina Shakovets	3–6, 5–7
Winner	26.	February 24, 2014	Mallorca, Spain	Clay	(Spain) Olga Parres Azcoitia	(Germany) Kim Grajdek (Netherlands) Monique Zuur	6–2, 7–6
Runner-up	27.	April 6, 2014	Pula, Italy	Clay	(Argentina) Tatiana Búa	(Italy) Alice Balducci (Romania) Diana Buzean	6–3, 1–6 [1–10]
Winner	28.	June 21, 2014	Montpellier, France	Clay	(Spain) Sara Sorribes Tormo	(Chinese Taipei) Hsu Chieh-yu (Bulgaria) Elitsa Kostova	2–6, 6–3, [12–10]
Winner	29.	19 September 2014	Madrid, Spain	Hard	(Greece) Maria Sakkari	(Spain) Yvonne Cavallé Reimers (Spain) Lucía Cervera Vázquez	6–2, 3–6, [11–9]
Runner-up	30.	2 November 2014	Benicarló, Spain	Clay	(Australia) Alexandra Nancarrow	(Spain) Aliona Bolsova (Venezuela) Andrea Gámiz	4–6, 1–6
