= Camelia Hristea =

Romanian tennis player

- Full name: Camelia-Elena Hristea
- Country (sports): Romania
- Residence: Balş, Romania
- Born: 3 February 1991 (age 34); Caracal, Romania
- Height: 170 cm (5 ft 7 in)
- Plays: Right-handed (two-handed backhand)
- Prize money: $53,588

Singles
- Career record: 161–188
- Career titles: 1 ITF
- Highest ranking: No. 579 (25 July 2011)

Doubles
- Career record: 201–154
- Career titles: 14 ITF
- Highest ranking: No. 345 (10 October 2011)

Camelia-Elena Hristea (born 3 February 1991) is a Romanian former tennis player.

On 10 October 2011, she reached her highest WTA doubles ranking of 345.

Hristea made her WTA Tour debut at the 2015 Bucharest Open in the doubles main draw, partnering Cristina Dinu.

== ITF Circuit finals ==
=== Singles: 2 (1–1) ===
Legend $25,000 tournaments $10,000 tournaments	Finals by surface Hard (0–0) Clay (1–1)

Result	No.	Datexf	Tournament	Surface	Opponent	Score
Win	1.	4 June 2012	ITF Sarajevo, Bosnia & Herzegovina	Clay	(Croatia) Bernarda Pera	6–3, 3–6, 6–4
Loss	1.	17 October 2015	ITF Albena, Bulgaria	Clay	(Bulgaria) Vivian Zlatanova	1–6, 5–7

=== Doubles: 34 (14–20) ===
Legend $10,000 tournaments	Finals by surface Clay (14–20)

Outcome	W–L	Date	Tournament	Surface	Partner	Opponents	Score
Winner	1.	9 September 2007	ITF Braşov, Romania	Clay	(Romania) Raluca Ciulei	(Romania) Irina-Camelia Begu (Romania) Diana Gae	7–5, 6–4
Winner	2.	18 July 2008	ITF Balş, Romania	Clay	(Romania) Ionela-Andreea Iova	(Romania) Laura Ioana Andrei (Romania) Diana Buzean	2–6, 6–4, [10–8]
Winner	3.	29 May 2009	ITF Piteşti, Romania	Clay	(Romania) Alexandra Damaschin	(Romania) Diana Buzean (Romania) Andreea Mitu	6–1, 6–4
Runner-up	1.	31 July 2009	ITF Oneşti, Romania	Clay	(Romania) Veronica Popovici	(Romania) Alexandra Damaschin (Romania) Diana Buzean	2–6, 1–6
Runner-up	2.	29 August 2009	ITF Velenje, Slovenia	Clay	(Romania) Diana Marcu	(Slovenia) Nastja Kolar (Slovenia) Polona Reberšak	3–6, 2–6
Runner-up	3.	25 September 2009	ITF Sandanski, Bulgaria	Clay	(Romania) Alice-Andrada Radu	(Italy) Raffaella Bindi (Italy) Federica Grazioso	3–6, 5–7
Winner	4.	25 October 2009	ITF Thessaloniki, Greece	Clay	(Romania) Diana Buzean	(Poland) Olga Brózda (Poland) Justyna Jegiołka	5–7, 6–4, [11–9]
Winner	5.	17 July 2010	ITF Prokuplje, Serbia	Clay	(Romania) Ionela Andreea Iova	(Slovenia) Jelena Durišič (Bulgaria) Isabella Shinikova	7–5, 6–4
Runner-up	4.	13 August 2010	ITF Oneşti, Romania	Clay	(Bulgaria) Biljana Pawlowa-Dimitrova	(Romania) Laura Ioana Andrei (Romania) Mihaela Buzărnescu	6–7^{(7)}, 2–6
Runner-up	5.	20 August 2010	ITF Bucharest, Romania	Clay	(Romania) Diana Buzean	(Romania) Laura Ioana Andrei (Romania) Mihaela Buzărnescu	1–6, 3–6
Winner	6.	8 October 2010	ITF Dobrich, Bulgaria	Clay	(Romania) Ionela Andreea Iova	(Bulgaria) Huliya Velieva (Bulgaria) Lütfiye Esen	6–0, 2–6, [10–6]
Winner	7.	29 May 2011	ITF Bucharest, Romania	Clay	(Romania) Laura Ioana Andrei	(Finland) Cecilia Estlander (Austria) Katharina Negrin	7–6^{(5)}, 6–1
Winner	8.	13 August 2011	ITF Bucharest, Romania	Clay	(Romania) Cristina Dinu	(Romania) Alexandra Damaschin (Romania) Andreea Mitu	1–6, 7–6^{(6)}, [10–4]
Winner	9.	27 August 2011	ITF Bucharest, Romania	Clay	(Romania) Laura Ioana Andrei	(Romania) Ionela Andreea Iova (Romania) Andreea Văideanu	6–1, 7–5
Winner	10.	23 September 2011	ITF Varna, Bulgaria	Clay	(Romania) Raluca Elena Platon	(Czech Republic) Jana Jandová (Czech Republic) Monika Tůmová	6–2, 6–3
Runner-up	6.	29 October 2011	ITF Antalya, Turkey	Clay	(Romania) Laura Ioana Andrei	(Romania) Diana Buzean (Netherlands) Daniëlle Harmsen	0–6, 3–6
Winner	11.	18 June 2012	ITF Craiova, Romania	Clay	(Romania) Alice Andrada Radu	(Romania) Laura Ioana Andrei (Romania) Raluca Elena Platon	6–0, 3–6, [10–6]
Runner-up	7.	25 June 2012	ITF Bals, Romania	Clay	(Romania) Alice Andrada Radu	(Romania) Laura-Ioana Andrei (Romania) Raluca Elena Platon	7–5, 3–6, [8–10]
Runner-up	8.	3 September 2012	ITF Belgrade, Serbia	Clay	(Slovakia) Lucia Butkovská	(Slovenia) Anja Prislan (Germany) Christina Shakovets	3–6, 3–6
Runner-up	9.	3 June 2013	ITF Sarajevo, Bosnia & Herzegovina	Clay	(Romania) Elena-Teodora Cadar	(Romania) Ana Bianca Mihăilă (Serbia) Kristina Ostojic	5–7, 4–6
Winner	12.	2 September 2013	ITF Belgrade, Serbia	Clay	(North Macedonia) Lina Gjorcheska	(Serbia) Tamara Čurović (Switzerland) Xenia Knoll	6–0, 6–1
Runner-up	10.	23 September 2013	ITF Varna, Bulgaria	Clay	(Belgium) Michaela Boev	(Romania) Raluca Elena Platon (Netherlands) Eva Wacanno	3–6, 4–6
Runner-up	11.	30 September 2013	ITF Albena, Bulgaria	Clay	(North Macedonia) Lina Gjorcheska	(Bulgaria) Dalia Zafirova (Netherlands) Eva Wacanno	6–4, 2–6, [8–10]
Runner-up	12.	7 October 2013	ITF Ruse, Bulgaria	Clay	(North Macedonia) Lina Gjorcheska	(Romania) Irina Bara (Netherlands) Eva Wacanno	1–6, 2–6
Winner	13.	26 May 2014	ITF Sibiu, Romania	Clay	(Romania) Oana Georgeta Simion	(Romania) Raluca Șerban (Czech Republic) Vendula Zovincová	7–6^{(2)}, 6–1
Winner	14.	16 June 2014	ITF Galați, Romania	Clay	(Romania) Patricia Maria Țig	(Ukraine) Maryna Kolb (Ukraine) Nadiya Kolb	6–3, 6–1
Runner-up	13.	27 July 2014	ITF Palić, Serbia	Clay	(Romania) Irina Bara	(North Macedonia) Lina Gjorcheska (Ukraine) Elizaveta Ianchuk	4–6, 1–6
Runner-up	14.	8 August 2014	ITF Arad, Romania	Clay	(North Macedonia) Lina Gjorcheska	(Romania) Irina Bara (Romania) Diana Buzean	6–4, 5–7, [6–10]
Runner-up	15.	22 August 2014	ITF Bucharest, Romania	Clay	(Romania) Oana Georgeta Simion	(Romania) Raluca Elena Platon (Romania) Cristina Stancu	1–6, 1–6
Runner-up	16.	1 June 2015	ITF Galați, Romania	Clay	(Moldova) Daniela Ciobanu	(Romania) Oana Georgeta Simion (Romania) Gabriela Talaba	6–4, 5–7, [8–10]
Runner-up	17.	21 November 2015	ITF Casablanca, Morocco	Clay	(Romania) Irina Fetecău	(Spain) Olga Parres Azcoitia (Italy) Camilla Rosatello	4–6, 3–6
Runner-up	18.	14 August 2016	ITF Arad, Romania	Clay	(Turkey) Yasmin Gülman	(Turkey) Ayla Aksu (Slovakia) Chantal Škamlová	4–6, 2–6
Runner-up	19.	16 June 2017	ITF Curtea de Argeș, Romania	Clay	(Romania) Gabriela Nicole Tătăruș	(Romania) Georgia Crăciun (Romania) Ilona Georgiana Ghioroaie	3–6, 5–7
Runner-up	20.	8 July 2017	ITF Focșani, Romania	Clay	(Italy) Martina Colmegna	(Romania) Oana Gavrilă (Russia) Ekaterina Kazionova	2–6, 1–6
