= 2010 ITF Women's Circuit (April–June) =

This is the April–June part of the 2010 ITF Women's Circuit.

== Key ==
$100,000 tournaments
$75,000 tournaments
$50,000 tournaments
$25,000 tournaments
$10,000 tournaments

== April ==
Week of	Tournament	Winner	Runners-up	Semifinalists	Quarterfinalists
April 5	Ain Elsokhna-Suiz, Egypt; Clay $10,000; Singles draw – Doubles draw	(Russia) Marta Sirotkina; 6–3 6–1	(Georgia (country)) Ekaterine Gorgodze	(Kyrgyzstan) Ksenia Palkina (Georgia (country)) Tatia Mikadze	(Czech Republic) Lucie Kriegsmannová (Estonia) Margit Rüütel (Georgia (country)) Sofia Kvatsabaia (India) Poojashree Venkatesha
April 5	Ain Elsokhna-Suiz, Egypt; Clay $10,000; Singles draw – Doubles draw	(Sweden) Anna Brazhnikova (Russia) Marta Sirotkina; 6–3 6–3	(France) Audrey Bergot (South Africa) Chanel Simmonds	(Kyrgyzstan) Ksenia Palkina (Georgia (country)) Tatia Mikadze	(Czech Republic) Lucie Kriegsmannová (Estonia) Margit Rüütel (Georgia (country)) Sofia Kvatsabaia (India) Poojashree Venkatesha
April 5	Torhout, Belgium; Hard $50,000; Singles draw – Doubles draw	(Germany) Mona Barthel; 2–6 6–4 6–2	(Canada) Rebecca Marino	(Serbia) Bojana Jovanovski (United Kingdom) Anne Keothavong	(United Kingdom) Katie O'Brien (Germany) Kathrin Wörle (Canada) Valérie Tétreault (United Kingdom) Anna Smith
April 5	Torhout, Belgium; Hard $50,000; Singles draw – Doubles draw	(Germany) Mona Barthel (Germany) Justine Ozga; 7–5 6–2	(Czech Republic) Hana Birnerová (Russia) Ekaterina Bychkova	(Serbia) Bojana Jovanovski (United Kingdom) Anne Keothavong	(United Kingdom) Katie O'Brien (Germany) Kathrin Wörle (Canada) Valérie Tétreault (United Kingdom) Anna Smith
April 5	Civitavecchia, Italy; Clay $25,000; Singles draw – Doubles draw	(Czech Republic) Renata Voráčová; 6–3 6–3	(Italy) Anna Floris	(Germany) Julia Schruff (Belarus) Darya Kustova	(Czech Republic) Zuzana Ondrášková (Estonia) Maret Ani (Italy) Federica Quercia (Romania) Liana Ungur
April 5	Civitavecchia, Italy; Clay $25,000; Singles draw – Doubles draw	(Belarus) Darya Kustova (Czech Republic) Renata Voráčová; 7–5 7–5	(Estonia) Maret Ani (Ukraine) Irina Buryachok	(Germany) Julia Schruff (Belarus) Darya Kustova	(Czech Republic) Zuzana Ondrášková (Estonia) Maret Ani (Italy) Federica Quercia (Romania) Liana Ungur
April 5	Incheon, South Korea; Hard $25,000; Singles draw – Doubles draw	(South Korea) Lee Jin-a; 6–4 6–2	(Romania) Irina-Camelia Begu	(Japan) Misaki Doi (South Korea) Kim So-jung	(Hong Kong) Zhang Ling (Australia) Sally Peers (Japan) Ryōko Fuda (Czech Republic) Kristýna Plíšková
April 5	Incheon, South Korea; Hard $25,000; Singles draw – Doubles draw	(Romania) Irina-Camelia Begu (Japan) Erika Sema; 6–0 7–6(8)	(Japan) Misaki Doi (Japan) Junri Namigata	(Japan) Misaki Doi (South Korea) Kim So-jung	(Hong Kong) Zhang Ling (Australia) Sally Peers (Japan) Ryōko Fuda (Czech Republic) Kristýna Plíšková
April 5	Jackson, Mississippi, United States; Clay $25,000; Singles draw – Doubles draw	(Croatia) Mirjana Lučić; 7–5 6–3	(United States) Jamie Hampton	(France) Claire de Gubernatis (Germany) Laura Siegemund	(Argentina) María Irigoyen (United Kingdom) Heather Watson (United States) Ahsha Rolle (Croatia) Ajla Tomljanović
April 5	Jackson, Mississippi, United States; Clay $25,000; Singles draw – Doubles draw	(Brazil) Maria Fernanda Alves (Brazil) Ana Clara Duarte; 6–4 3–6 [10–5]	(Argentina) María Irigoyen (Argentina) Florencia Molinero	(France) Claire de Gubernatis (Germany) Laura Siegemund	(Argentina) María Irigoyen (United Kingdom) Heather Watson (United States) Ahsha Rolle (Croatia) Ajla Tomljanović
April 5	Hvar, Croatia; Clay $10,000; Singles draw – Doubles draw	(Romania) Mădălina Gojnea; 6–4 6–4	(Bosnia and Herzegovina) Ema Burgić	(Liechtenstein) Stephanie Vogt (Hungary) Zsófia Mikó	(Romania) Alexandra Damaschin (Czech Republic) Simona Dobrá (Italy) Elisa Balsamo (Italy) Martina Caciotti
April 5	Hvar, Croatia; Clay $10,000; Singles draw – Doubles draw	(Netherlands) Marlot Meddens (Netherlands) Nicole Thijssen; 6–4 6–1	(Netherlands) Leonie Mekel (Liechtenstein) Stephanie Vogt	(Liechtenstein) Stephanie Vogt (Hungary) Zsófia Mikó	(Romania) Alexandra Damaschin (Czech Republic) Simona Dobrá (Italy) Elisa Balsamo (Italy) Martina Caciotti
April 5	Ningbo, China; Hard $10,000; Singles draw – Doubles draw	(China) Tian Ran; 6–2 6–3	(China) Zheng Saisai	(China) Duan Yingying (China) Zhang Kailin	(China) Zhou Xian (China) Li Ting (China) Guo Lu (China) Zhu Lin
April 5	Ningbo, China; Hard $10,000; Singles draw – Doubles draw	(China) Wang Yafan (China) Yang Zhaoxuan; 1–6 6–2 [10–4]	(China) Lu Jia Xiang (Hong Kong) Yang Zi-Jun	(China) Duan Yingying (China) Zhang Kailin	(China) Zhou Xian (China) Li Ting (China) Guo Lu (China) Zhu Lin
April 12	San Severo, Italy; Clay $10,000; Singles draw – Doubles draw	(Serbia) Milana Špremo; 2–6 6–3 7–5	(Italy) Erika Zanchetta	(Austria) Iris Khanna (Italy) Martina Di Giuseppe	(Netherlands) Angelique van der Meet (Italy) Vivienne Vierin (Slovenia) Dalila Jakupovič (Italy) Federica Quercia
April 12	San Severo, Italy; Clay $10,000; Singles draw – Doubles draw	(Italy) Gioia Barbieri (Italy) Anastasia Grymalska; 4–6 6–2 [11–9]	(Russia) Karina Pimkina (Russia) Marina Shamayko	(Austria) Iris Khanna (Italy) Martina Di Giuseppe	(Netherlands) Angelique van der Meet (Italy) Vivienne Vierin (Slovenia) Dalila Jakupovič (Italy) Federica Quercia
April 12	Bol, Croatia; Clay $10,000; Singles draw – Doubles draw	(Croatia) Dijana Banoveć; 6–3 7–6(5)	(France) Cindy Chala	(Romania) Alexandra Cadanțu (Croatia) Matea Mezak	(Liechtenstein) Stephanie Vogt (France) Alizé Lim (Slovakia) Romana Tabak (Croatia) Silvia Njirić
April 12	Bol, Croatia; Clay $10,000; Singles draw – Doubles draw	(Romania) Alexandra Cadanțu (Romania) Alexandra Damaschin; 6–2 1–6 [10–5]	(Slovakia) Chantal Škamlová (Slovakia) Romana Tabak	(Romania) Alexandra Cadanțu (Croatia) Matea Mezak	(Liechtenstein) Stephanie Vogt (France) Alizé Lim (Slovakia) Romana Tabak (Croatia) Silvia Njirić
April 12	Astana, Kazakhstan; Hard $10,000; Singles draw – Doubles draw	(Georgia (country)) Manana Shapakidze; 6–7(4) 6–1 6–4	(Russia) Daria Kuchmina	(United Kingdom) Lisa Whybourn (Russia) Eugeniya Pashkova	(Russia) Diana Arutyunova (Russia) Maria Zharkova (Russia) Anna Rapoport (Russia) Alexandra Artamonova
April 12	Astana, Kazakhstan; Hard $10,000; Singles draw – Doubles draw	(Russia) Eugeniya Pashkova (Russia) Maria Zharkova; 6–0 6–1	(Russia) Alexandra Artamonova (Ukraine) Khristina Kazimova	(United Kingdom) Lisa Whybourn (Russia) Eugeniya Pashkova	(Russia) Diana Arutyunova (Russia) Maria Zharkova (Russia) Anna Rapoport (Russia) Alexandra Artamonova
April 12	Soweto Open; Johannesburg, South Africa; Hard $100,000+H; Singles draw – Doubles draw	(Russia) Nina Bratchikova; 7–5 7–6(2)	(Thailand) Tamarine Tanasugarn	(Australia) Jarmila Groth (Luxembourg) Mandy Minella	(United Kingdom) Elena Baltacha (Canada) Stéphanie Dubois (Ukraine) Mariya Koryttseva (Austria) Patricia Mayr
April 12	Soweto Open; Johannesburg, South Africa; Hard $100,000+H; Singles draw – Doubles draw	(Russia) Vitalia Diatchenko (Greece) Irini Georgatou; 6–3 5–7 [16–14]	(New Zealand) Marina Erakovic (Thailand) Tamarine Tanasugarn	(Australia) Jarmila Groth (Luxembourg) Mandy Minella	(United Kingdom) Elena Baltacha (Canada) Stéphanie Dubois (Ukraine) Mariya Koryttseva (Austria) Patricia Mayr
April 12	Osprey, Florida, United States; Clay $25,000; Singles draw – Doubles draw	(United States) Jamie Hampton; 6–1 6–3	(Argentina) Florencia Molinero	(United States) Beatrice Capra (Belgium) Tamaryn Hendler	(Canada) Eugenie Bouchard (Ukraine) Tetiana Luzhanska (Argentina) Jorgelina Cravero (Argentina) María Irigoyen
April 12	Osprey, Florida, United States; Clay $25,000; Singles draw – Doubles draw	(Argentina) María Irigoyen (Argentina) Florencia Molinero; 6–1 7–6(3)	(United States) Madison Brengle (United States) Asia Muhammad	(United States) Beatrice Capra (Belgium) Tamaryn Hendler	(Canada) Eugenie Bouchard (Ukraine) Tetiana Luzhanska (Argentina) Jorgelina Cravero (Argentina) María Irigoyen
April 12	Gimhae, South Korea; Hard $25,000; Singles draw – Doubles draw	(Chinese Taipei) Chan Yung-Jan; 6–2 6–1	(France) Irena Pavlovic	(Japan) Junri Namigata (Japan) Ryōko Fuda	(South Korea) Kim Na-ri (France) Anaïs Laurendon (South Korea) Lee So-ra (Ukraine) Tetyana Arefyeva
April 12	Gimhae, South Korea; Hard $25,000; Singles draw – Doubles draw	(South Korea) Chang Kyung-mi (South Korea) Lee Jin-a; 1–6 6–4 [10–8]	(Japan) Misaki Doi (Japan) Junri Namigata	(Japan) Junri Namigata (Japan) Ryōko Fuda	(South Korea) Kim Na-ri (France) Anaïs Laurendon (South Korea) Lee So-ra (Ukraine) Tetyana Arefyeva
April 12	Cairo, Egypt; Clay $25,000; Singles draw – Doubles draw	(Czech Republic) Renata Voráčová; 6–3 6–4	(France) Audrey Bergot	(Romania) Liana Ungur (France) Mathilde Johansson	(Czech Republic) Petra Cetkovská (Spain) María Teresa Torró Flor (Slovenia) Tadeja Majerič (Italy) Evelyn Mayr
April 12	Cairo, Egypt; Clay $25,000; Singles draw – Doubles draw	(Czech Republic) Eva Birnerová (Czech Republic) Renata Voráčová; 7–6(4) 6–4	(Belarus) Ksenia Milevskaya (Slovakia) Lenka Wienerová	(Romania) Liana Ungur (France) Mathilde Johansson	(Czech Republic) Petra Cetkovská (Spain) María Teresa Torró Flor (Slovenia) Tadeja Majerič (Italy) Evelyn Mayr
April 12	Tessenderlo, Belgium; Clay $25,000; Singles draw – Doubles draw	(Germany) Nicola Geuer; 4–6 6–2 6–3	(Italy) Romina Oprandi	(Croatia) Ana Vrljić (Netherlands) Bibiane Schoofs	(Spain) Yera Campos Molina (Ukraine) Oksana Lyubtsova (France) Karla Mraz (Belgium) Sofie Oyen
April 12	Tessenderlo, Belgium; Clay $25,000; Singles draw – Doubles draw	(Poland) Magdalena Kiszczyńska (Finland) Emma Laine; 6–4 6–1	(Poland) Olga Brózda (Poland) Barbara Sobaszkiewicz	(Croatia) Ana Vrljić (Netherlands) Bibiane Schoofs	(Spain) Yera Campos Molina (Ukraine) Oksana Lyubtsova (France) Karla Mraz (Belgium) Sofie Oyen
April 19	2010 Dothan Pro Classic; Dothan, United States; Clay $50,000; Singles draw – Doubles draw	(Romania) Edina Gallovits; 6–1 6–4	(Belarus) Anastasiya Yakimova	(United Kingdom) Laura Robson (United States) Abigail Spears	(Australia) Sophie Ferguson (Russia) Evgeniya Rodina (United States) Jamie Hampton (United States) Varvara Lepchenko
April 19	2010 Dothan Pro Classic; Dothan, United States; Clay $50,000; Singles draw – Doubles draw	(Russia) Alina Jidkova (Belarus) Anastasiya Yakimova; 6–4 6–2	(Argentina) María Irigoyen (Serbia) Teodora Mirčić	(United Kingdom) Laura Robson (United States) Abigail Spears	(Australia) Sophie Ferguson (Russia) Evgeniya Rodina (United States) Jamie Hampton (United States) Varvara Lepchenko
April 19	Bari, Italy; Clay $25,000; Singles draw – Doubles draw	(Slovakia) Kristína Kučová; 6–4 6–2	(Slovakia) Zuzana Ondrášková	(Italy) Giulia Gatto-Monticone (Russia) Anastasia Pivovarova	(Italy) Anna Floris (Czech Republic) Eva Birnerová (Belarus) Iryna Kuryanovich (France) Stéphanie Foretz
April 19	Bari, Italy; Clay $25,000; Singles draw – Doubles draw	(Ukraine) Irina Buryachok (Russia) Anastasia Pivovarova; 6–7(3) 6–4 [10–4]	(Italy) Giulia Gatto-Monticone (Italy) Federica Querica	(Italy) Giulia Gatto-Monticone (Russia) Anastasia Pivovarova	(Italy) Anna Floris (Czech Republic) Eva Birnerová (Belarus) Iryna Kuryanovich (France) Stéphanie Foretz
April 19	Changwon, South Korea; Hard $25,000; Singles draw – Doubles draw	(South Korea) Lee Jin-a; 3–6 6–4 6–2	(China) Xu Yifan	(South Korea) Kim So-jung (Chinese Taipei) Hsieh Su-wei	(South Korea) Kim Kun-Hee (United Kingdom) Melanie South (South Korea) Lee Ye-ra (Japan) Misaki Doi
April 19	Changwon, South Korea; Hard $25,000; Singles draw – Doubles draw	(South Korea) Chang Kyung-mi (South Korea) Lee Jin-a; 5–7 6–3 10–8	(Japan) Misaki Doi (Japan) Junri Namigata	(South Korea) Kim So-jung (Chinese Taipei) Hsieh Su-wei	(South Korea) Kim Kun-Hee (United Kingdom) Melanie South (South Korea) Lee Ye-ra (Japan) Misaki Doi
April 19	Torrent, Spain; Clay $10,000; Singles draw – Doubles draw	(Puerto Rico) Monica Puig; 3–6 6–1 6–2	(Russia) Nanuli Pipiya	(Spain) Pilar Domínguez López (Poland) Magda Linette	(Spain) Sheila Solsona Carcasona (United Kingdom) Amanda Carreras (Romania) Cristina Stancu (Spain) Lucía Paz Monteagudo
April 19	Torrent, Spain; Clay $10,000; Singles draw – Doubles draw	(Italy) Benedetta Davato (Ukraine) Yevgeniya Kryvoruchko; Walkover	(Spain) Nuria Párrizas Díaz (Spain) Sheila Solsona Carcasona	(Spain) Pilar Domínguez López (Poland) Magda Linette	(Spain) Sheila Solsona Carcasona (United Kingdom) Amanda Carreras (Romania) Cristina Stancu (Spain) Lucía Paz Monteagudo
April 19	Šibenik, Croatia; Clay $10,000; Singles draw – Doubles draw	(Romania) Mădălina Gojnea; 6–2 6–1	(Switzerland) Conny Perrin	(Netherlands) Leonie Mekel (Croatia) Dijana Banoveć	(Germany) Sarah-Rebecca Sekulic (Slovakia) Zuzana Zlochová (Bosnia and Herzegovina) Jasmina Kajtazovič (Croatia) Indire Akiki
April 19	Šibenik, Croatia; Clay $10,000; Singles draw – Doubles draw	(Romania) Alexandra Cadanțu (Bulgaria) Dalia Zafirova; 6–2 6–3	(Croatia) Maria Abramović (Romania) Mădălina Gojnea	(Netherlands) Leonie Mekel (Croatia) Dijana Banoveć	(Germany) Sarah-Rebecca Sekulic (Slovakia) Zuzana Zlochová (Bosnia and Herzegovina) Jasmina Kajtazovič (Croatia) Indire Akiki
April 19	Almaty, Kazakhstan; Hard $10,000; Singles draw – Doubles draw	(Kyrgyzstan) Ksenia Palkina; 7–5 4–6 6–4	(Russia) Eugeniya Pashkova	(Russia) Daria Kuchmina (Georgia (country)) Manana Shapakidze	(Uzbekistan) Alexandra Kolesnichenko (Turkmenistan) Anastasiya Prenko (Belarus) Viktoria Yemialyanava (Russia) Diana Arutyunova
April 19	Almaty, Kazakhstan; Hard $10,000; Singles draw – Doubles draw	(Russia) Eugeniya Pashkova (Russia) Maria Zharkova; 3–6 7–6(9) [10–7]	(Kyrgyzstan) Ksenia Palkina (Turkmenistan) Anastasiya Prenko	(Russia) Daria Kuchmina (Georgia (country)) Manana Shapakidze	(Uzbekistan) Alexandra Kolesnichenko (Turkmenistan) Anastasiya Prenko (Belarus) Viktoria Yemialyanava (Russia) Diana Arutyunova
April 19	Mie, Japan; Carpet $10,000; Singles draw – Doubles draw	(Japan) Sachie Ishizu; 6–0 6–4	(Japan) Yumi Nakano	(Japan) Yurina Koshino (Japan) Emi Mutaguchi	(Japan) Mari Tanaka (China) Lu Jia-Jing (Japan) Yuuki Tanaka (Japan) Kazusa Ito
April 19	Mie, Japan; Carpet $10,000; Singles draw – Doubles draw	(Japan) Yurina Koshino (Japan) Miki Miyamura; 6–4 7–6(7)	(Japan) Miyabi Inoue (Japan) Aiko Yoshitomi	(Japan) Yurina Koshino (Japan) Emi Mutaguchi	(Japan) Mari Tanaka (China) Lu Jia-Jing (Japan) Yuuki Tanaka (Japan) Kazusa Ito
April 19	Poza Rica, Mexico; Hard $25,000; Singles draw – Doubles draw	(United States) Lauren Albanese; 6–4 6–1	(United States) Julia Cohen	(Austria) Melanie Klaffner (Bolivia) María Fernanda Álvarez Terán	(Brazil) Vivian Segnini (Russia) Yana Koroleva (United States) Lena Litvak (United States) Katie Ruckert
April 19	Poza Rica, Mexico; Hard $25,000; Singles draw – Doubles draw	(United States) Lauren Albanese (United States) Julia Cohen; 6–3 7–6(6)	(United States) Macall Harkins (Brazil) Vivian Segnini	(Austria) Melanie Klaffner (Bolivia) María Fernanda Álvarez Terán	(Brazil) Vivian Segnini (Russia) Yana Koroleva (United States) Lena Litvak (United States) Katie Ruckert
April 26	Cagnes-sur-Mer, France; Hard $100,000+H; Singles draw – Doubles draw	(Estonia) Kaia Kanepi; 6–3 6–2	(Slovenia) Maša Zec Peškirič	(Germany) Kristina Barrois (Spain) Lourdes Domínguez Lino	(Kazakhstan) Yaroslava Shvedova (France) Caroline Garcia (Netherlands) Arantxa Rus (Latvia) Anastasija Sevastova
April 26	Cagnes-sur-Mer, France; Hard $100,000+H; Singles draw – Doubles draw	(Bosnia and Herzegovina) Mervana Jugić-Salkić (Croatia) Darija Jurak; 0–6 6–2 [10–5]	(France) Stéphanie Cohen-Aloro (France) Kristina Mladenovic	(Germany) Kristina Barrois (Spain) Lourdes Domínguez Lino	(Kazakhstan) Yaroslava Shvedova (France) Caroline Garcia (Netherlands) Arantxa Rus (Latvia) Anastasija Sevastova
April 26	Gifu, Japan; Hard $50,000; Singles draw – Doubles draw	(Czech Republic) Karolína Plíšková; 6–3 3–6 6–3	(China) Sun Shengnan	(Ukraine) Tetyana Arefyeva (Czech Republic) Kristýna Plíšková	(Japan) Tomoko Yonemura (Japan) Ryōko Fuda (Japan) Misaki Doi (Japan) Remi Tezuka
April 26	Gifu, Japan; Hard $50,000; Singles draw – Doubles draw	(Japan) Erika Sema (Japan) Tomoko Yonemura; 6–3 2–6 [10–7]	(Russia) Ksenia Lykina (United Kingdom) Melanie South	(Ukraine) Tetyana Arefyeva (Czech Republic) Kristýna Plíšková	(Japan) Tomoko Yonemura (Japan) Ryōko Fuda (Japan) Misaki Doi (Japan) Remi Tezuka
April 26	Boyd Tinsley 2010 Women's Clay Court Classic; Charlottesville, United States; Clay $50,000; Singles draw – Doubles draw	(Netherlands) Michaëlla Krajicek; 6–2 6–4	(Germany) Laura Siegemund	(Belarus) Anastasiya Yakimova (Russia) Arina Rodionova	(United States) Madison Brengle (United Kingdom) Laura Robson (United States) Lilia Osterloh (United States) Lindsay Lee-Waters
April 26	Boyd Tinsley 2010 Women's Clay Court Classic; Charlottesville, United States; Clay $50,000; Singles draw – Doubles draw	(United States) Julie Ditty (United States) Carly Gullickson; 6–4 6–3	(United States) Alexandra Mueller (United States) Ahsha Rolle	(Belarus) Anastasiya Yakimova (Russia) Arina Rodionova	(United States) Madison Brengle (United Kingdom) Laura Robson (United States) Lilia Osterloh (United States) Lindsay Lee-Waters
April 26	Brescia, Italy; Clay $25,000; Singles draw – Doubles draw	(United Kingdom) Naomi Cavaday; 6–2 6–4	(Czech Republic) Andrea Hlaváčková	(France) Stéphanie Foretz (Poland) Anna Korzeniak	(Italy) Anna-Giulia Remondina (China) Han Xinyun (Russia) Anastasia Pivovarova (Czech Republic) Zuzana Ondrášková
April 26	Brescia, Italy; Clay $25,000; Singles draw – Doubles draw	(United Kingdom) Naomi Cavaday (Russia) Anastasia Pivovarova; 6–3 6–7(5) [10–8]	(Belarus) Iryna Kuryanovich (Russia) Valeria Savinykh	(France) Stéphanie Foretz (Poland) Anna Korzeniak	(Italy) Anna-Giulia Remondina (China) Han Xinyun (Russia) Anastasia Pivovarova (Czech Republic) Zuzana Ondrášková
April 26	Ipswich, Australia; Clay $25,000; Singles draw – Doubles draw	(Australia) Sally Peers; 6–4 6–3	(Australia) Sophie Letcher	(Australia) Karolina Wlodarczak (United States) Lauren Albanese	(Australia) Shannon Golds (Australia) Bojana Bobusic (Australia) Emelyn Starr (Japan) Miki Miyamura
April 26	Ipswich, Australia; Clay $25,000; Singles draw – Doubles draw	(Japan) Moe Kawatoko (Japan) Miki Miyamura; 6–4 4–6 [10–5]	(Australia) Isabella Holland (Australia) Sally Peers	(Australia) Karolina Wlodarczak (United States) Lauren Albanese	(Australia) Shannon Golds (Australia) Bojana Bobusic (Australia) Emelyn Starr (Japan) Miki Miyamura
April 26	Vic, Spain; Clay $10,000; Singles draw – Doubles draw	(Spain) Isabel Rapisarda Calvo; 6–3 7–5	(Spain) Laura Apaolaza Miradevilla	(Romania) Mihaela Buzărnescu (Italy) Annalisa Bona	(Poland) Magda Linette (France) Elixane Lechemia (Russia) Karina Pimkina (France) Victoria Larrière
April 26	Vic, Spain; Clay $10,000; Singles draw – Doubles draw	(Romania) Mihaela Buzărnescu (Romania) Cristina Stancu; 7–5 3–6 [10–7]	(Poland) Olga Brózda (Poland) Barbara Sobaskiewicz	(Romania) Mihaela Buzărnescu (Italy) Annalisa Bona	(Poland) Magda Linette (France) Elixane Lechemia (Russia) Karina Pimkina (France) Victoria Larrière
April 26	Bournemouth, United Kingdom; Clay $10,000; Singles draw – Doubles draw	(Slovakia) Romana Tabak; 6–1 6–7(7) 7–6(7)	(United Kingdom) Lisa Whybourn	(United Kingdom) Francesca Stephenson (France) Audrey Bergot	(Poland) Patrycja Sanduska (Italy) Alice Balducci (United Kingdom) Tara Moore (United Kingdom) Lucy Brown
April 26	Bournemouth, United Kingdom; Clay $10,000; Singles draw – Doubles draw	(Italy) Alice Balducci (Italy) Martina Caciotti; 6–4 6–3	(Australia) Alexandra Cannizzaro (United Kingdom) Jessica Ren	(United Kingdom) Francesca Stephenson (France) Audrey Bergot	(Poland) Patrycja Sanduska (Italy) Alice Balducci (United Kingdom) Tara Moore (United Kingdom) Lucy Brown
April 26	Antalya, Turkey; Clay $10,000; Singles draw – Doubles draw	(Tunisia) Ons Jabeur; 2–1, retired	(Poland) Sandra Zaniewska	(Russia) Viktoria Kamenskaya (Czech Republic) Martina Kubičíkova	(Ukraine) Nadiia Kichenok (Slovakia) Zuzana Zlochová (Netherlands) Marcella Koek (Netherlands) Daniëlle Harmsen
April 26	Antalya, Turkey; Clay $10,000; Singles draw – Doubles draw	(Turkey) Pemra Özgen (Poland) Sandra Zaniewska; 6–1 6–2	(Croatia) Indire Akiki (Czech Republic) Martina Kubičíkova	(Russia) Viktoria Kamenskaya (Czech Republic) Martina Kubičíkova	(Ukraine) Nadiia Kichenok (Slovakia) Zuzana Zlochová (Netherlands) Marcella Koek (Netherlands) Daniëlle Harmsen
April 26	Gimcheon, South Korea; Hard $25,000; Singles draw – Doubles draw	(South Korea) Kim Na-ri; 6–2 7–5	(South Korea) Lee Ye-Ra	(South Korea) Kim Kun-Hee (Chinese Taipei) Hsu Wen-hsin	(Hong Kong) Ling Zhang (Ukraine) Veronika Kapshay (France) Estelle Guisard (South Korea) Lee Jin-a
April 26	Gimcheon, South Korea; Hard $25,000; Singles draw – Doubles draw	(South Korea) Chang Kyung-mi (South Korea) Lee Jin-a; 7–5 6–3	(South Korea) Kim Kun-Hee (South Korea) Yu Min-Hwa	(South Korea) Kim Kun-Hee (Chinese Taipei) Hsu Wen-hsin	(Hong Kong) Ling Zhang (Ukraine) Veronika Kapshay (France) Estelle Guisard (South Korea) Lee Jin-a

== May ==
Week of	Tournament	Winner	Runners-up	Semifinalists	Quarterfinalists
May 3	Jounieh, Lebanon; Clay $50,000+H; Singles draw – Doubles draw	(Austria) Patricia Mayr; 6–3 6–7(3) 7–6(7)	(Czech Republic) Renata Voráčová	(Slovakia) Zuzana Kučová (France) Nathalie Piquion	(Ukraine) Mariya Koryttseva (Russia) Ksenia Pervak (Czech Republic) Eva Birnerová (Slovakia) Lenka Juríková
May 3	Jounieh, Lebanon; Clay $50,000+H; Singles draw – Doubles draw	(Czech Republic) Petra Cetkovská (Czech Republic) Renata Voráčová; 6–4 6–2	(Belarus) Ksenia Milevskaya (Ukraine) Lesia Tsurenko	(Slovakia) Zuzana Kučová (France) Nathalie Piquion	(Ukraine) Mariya Koryttseva (Russia) Ksenia Pervak (Czech Republic) Eva Birnerová (Slovakia) Lenka Juríková
May 3	2010 MIMA Foundation USTA Pro Tennis Classic; Indian Harbour Beach, Florida, United States; Clay $50,000; Singles draw – Doubles draw	(Romania) Edina Gallovits; 2–6 6–3 6–4	(United States) Shelby Rogers	(Belarus) Anastasiya Yakimova (United States) Julia Boserup	(Australia) Johanna Konta (Croatia) Mirjana Lučić (Netherlands) Michaëlla Krajicek (United States) Alexandra Stevenson
May 3	2010 MIMA Foundation USTA Pro Tennis Classic; Indian Harbour Beach, Florida, United States; Clay $50,000; Singles draw – Doubles draw	(United States) Christina Fusano (United States) Courtney Nagle; 6–3 7–6(4)	(United States) Julie Ditty (United States) Carly Gullickson	(Belarus) Anastasiya Yakimova (United States) Julia Boserup	(Australia) Johanna Konta (Croatia) Mirjana Lučić (Netherlands) Michaëlla Krajicek (United States) Alexandra Stevenson
May 3	Fukuoka, Japan; Carpet $50,000; Singles draw – Doubles draw	(Japan) Junri Namigata; 6–1 6–2	(Austria) Nikola Hofmanova	(Russia) Alexandra Panova (Japan) Shiho Akita	(Japan) Ryōko Fuda (Russia) Ksenia Lykina (Japan) Rika Fujiwara (New Zealand) Ellen Barry
May 3	Fukuoka, Japan; Carpet $50,000; Singles draw – Doubles draw	(Japan) Misaki Doi (Japan) Kotomi Takahata; 6–4 6–4	(New Zealand) Marina Erakovic (Russia) Alexandra Panova	(Russia) Alexandra Panova (Japan) Shiho Akita	(Japan) Ryōko Fuda (Russia) Ksenia Lykina (Japan) Rika Fujiwara (New Zealand) Ellen Barry
May 3	Rio de Janeiro, Brazil; Clay $25,000; Singles draw – Doubles draw	(Peru) Bianca Botto; 6–2 1–6 6–4	(France) Olivia Sanchez	(Argentina) Florencia Molinero (Ukraine) Maryna Zanevska	(Brazil) Ana Clara Duarte (United Kingdom) Amanda Carreras (Spain) María Teresa Torró Flor (Argentina) Carla Lucero
May 3	Rio de Janeiro, Brazil; Clay $25,000; Singles draw – Doubles draw	(Peru) Bianca Botto (United Kingdom) Amanda Carreras; 3–6 6–4 [10–8]	(Bolivia) María Fernanda Álvarez Terán (Slovenia) Andreja Klepač	(Argentina) Florencia Molinero (Ukraine) Maryna Zanevska	(Brazil) Ana Clara Duarte (United Kingdom) Amanda Carreras (Spain) María Teresa Torró Flor (Argentina) Carla Lucero
May 3	Bundaberg, Australia; Clay $25,000; Singles draw – Doubles draw	(Japan) Natsumi Hamamura; 6–0 6–4	(Australia) Sally Peers	(Australia) Jessica Moore (Australia) Marija Mirkovic	(Australia) Sophie Letcher (Japan) Mari Inoue (Australia) Tammi Patterson (Australia) Shannon Golds
May 3	Bundaberg, Australia; Clay $25,000; Singles draw – Doubles draw	(Australia) Marija Mirkovic (Australia) Jessica Moore; 6–3 1–6 [10–7]	(Australia) Viktorija Rajicic (Australia) Emelyn Starr	(Australia) Jessica Moore (Australia) Marija Mirkovic	(Australia) Sophie Letcher (Japan) Mari Inoue (Australia) Tammi Patterson (Australia) Shannon Golds
May 3	Florence, Italy; Clay $25,000; Singles draw – Doubles draw	(Romania) Liana Ungur; 6–3 7–5	(Belarus) Polina Pekhova	(Georgia (country)) Margalita Chakhnashvili (Italy) Anna-Giulia Remondina	(Russia) Anastasia Pivovarova (Serbia) Milana Špremo (Estonia) Maret Ani (Italy) Evelyn Mayr
May 3	Florence, Italy; Clay $25,000; Singles draw – Doubles draw	(Estonia) Maret Ani (Germany) Julia Schruff; 6–3 6–4	(China) Lu Jingjing (Belarus) Polina Pekhova	(Georgia (country)) Margalita Chakhnashvili (Italy) Anna-Giulia Remondina	(Russia) Anastasia Pivovarova (Serbia) Milana Špremo (Estonia) Maret Ani (Italy) Evelyn Mayr
May 3	Kharkiv, Ukraine; Hard $25,000; Singles draw – Doubles draw	(Turkey) Çağla Büyükakçay; 6–4 6–1	(Russia) Natalia Orlova	(Ukraine) Kateryna Kozlova (Slovenia) Tadeja Majerič	(Russia) Eugeniya Paskhova (Georgia (country)) Sofia Shapatava (Ukraine) Oksana Lyubtsova (Ukraine) Veronika Kapshay
May 3	Kharkiv, Ukraine; Hard $25,000; Singles draw – Doubles draw	(Ukraine) Lyudmyla Kichenok (Ukraine) Nadiia Kichenok; 6–4 6–2	(Ukraine) Kateryna Kozlova (Ukraine) Elina Svitolina	(Ukraine) Kateryna Kozlova (Slovenia) Tadeja Majerič	(Russia) Eugeniya Paskhova (Georgia (country)) Sofia Shapatava (Ukraine) Oksana Lyubtsova (Ukraine) Veronika Kapshay
May 3	Badalona, Spain; Clay $10,000; Singles draw – Doubles draw	(Spain) Lara Arruabarrena Vecino; 6–4 6–3	(Ukraine) Yevgeniya Kryvoruchko	(Italy) Annalisa Bona (Puerto Rico) Monica Puig	(Italy) Benedetta Davato (Italy) Valentina Sulpizio (Netherlands) Angelique van der Meet (France) Elixane Lechemia
May 3	Badalona, Spain; Clay $10,000; Singles draw – Doubles draw	(Poland) Olga Brózda (Poland) Barbara Sobaszkiewicz; 6–1 6–4	(Spain) Sheila Solsona Carcasona (Mexico) Alina Sullivan	(Italy) Annalisa Bona (Puerto Rico) Monica Puig	(Italy) Benedetta Davato (Italy) Valentina Sulpizio (Netherlands) Angelique van der Meet (France) Elixane Lechemia
May 3	Wiesbaden, Germany; Clay $10,000; Singles draw – Doubles draw	(Germany) Scarlett Werner; 5–7 6–2 6–4	(Netherlands) Elise Tamaëla	(Russia) Avgusta Tsybysheva (Croatia) Indire Akiki	(Bosnia and Herzegovina) Sandra Martinović (Germany) Linda Berlinecke (Serbia) Nataša Zorić (Slovakia) Jana Čepelová
May 3	Wiesbaden, Germany; Clay $10,000; Singles draw – Doubles draw	(Serbia) Barbara Bonić (Serbia) Nataša Zorić; 6–2 6–2	(Netherlands) Quirine Lemoine (Netherlands) Marlot Meddens	(Russia) Avgusta Tsybysheva (Croatia) Indire Akiki	(Bosnia and Herzegovina) Sandra Martinović (Germany) Linda Berlinecke (Serbia) Nataša Zorić (Slovakia) Jana Čepelová
May 3	Edinburgh, United Kingdom; Clay $10,000; Singles draw – Doubles draw	(Hungary) Tímea Babos; 6–2 6–2	(United Kingdom) Tara Moore	(Czech Republic) Jana Jandová (France) Alizé Lim	(United Kingdom) Anna Fitzpatrick (Italy) Carolina Pillot (Germany) Bianca Koch (United Kingdom) Lisa Whybourn
May 3	Edinburgh, United Kingdom; Clay $10,000; Singles draw – Doubles draw	(United Kingdom) Amanda Elliott (United Kingdom) Jocelyn Rae; 7–6(5) 6–4	(Hungary) Tímea Babos (United Kingdom) Tara Moore	(Czech Republic) Jana Jandová (France) Alizé Lim	(United Kingdom) Anna Fitzpatrick (Italy) Carolina Pillot (Germany) Bianca Koch (United Kingdom) Lisa Whybourn
May 3	Tarakan, Indonesia; Hard $10,000; Singles draw – Doubles draw	(Hong Kong) Zhang Ling; 6–3 6–4	(China) Hu Yue-Yue	(Japan) Kasame Hisami (South Korea) Han Sung-hee	(Uzbekistan) Sabina Sharipova (Thailand) Noppawan Lertcheewakarn (Thailand) Nudnida Luangnam (Indonesia) Lavinia Tananta
May 3	Tarakan, Indonesia; Hard $10,000; Singles draw – Doubles draw	(Indonesia) Ayu-Fani Damayanti (Indonesia) Lavinia Tananta; 6–4 7–5	(China) Liu Wan-Ting (Japan) Mari Tanaka	(Japan) Kasame Hisami (South Korea) Han Sung-hee	(Uzbekistan) Sabina Sharipova (Thailand) Noppawan Lertcheewakarn (Thailand) Nudnida Luangnam (Indonesia) Lavinia Tananta
May 10	2010 Open GDF Suez de Midi-Pyrénées; Saint-Gaudens, France; Clay $50,000+H; Singles draw – Doubles draw	(Estonia) Kaia Kanepi; 6–2 7–5	(China) Zhang Shuai	(China) Han Xinyun (France) Stéphanie Cohen-Aloro	(Australia) Olivia Rogowska (Argentina) María Irigoyen (Ukraine) Iryna Kuryanovich (Russia) Elena Chalova
May 10	2010 Open GDF Suez de Midi-Pyrénées; Saint-Gaudens, France; Clay $50,000+H; Singles draw – Doubles draw	(France) Claire Feuerstein (France) Stéphanie Foretz; 6–2 6–4	(Ukraine) Olga Savchuk (Belarus) Anastasiya Yakimova	(China) Han Xinyun (France) Stéphanie Cohen-Aloro	(Australia) Olivia Rogowska (Argentina) María Irigoyen (Ukraine) Iryna Kuryanovich (Russia) Elena Chalova
May 10	Kurume, Fukuoka, Japan; Carpet $50,000; Singles draw – Doubles draw	(Czech Republic) Kristýna Plíšková; 5–7 6–2 6–0	(Czech Republic) Karolína Plíšková	(Japan) Sachie Ishizu (China) Sun Shengnan	(United Kingdom) Melanie South (South Korea) Kim So-jung (South Korea) Lee Jin-a (Japan) Kotomi Takahata
May 10	Kurume, Fukuoka, Japan; Carpet $50,000; Singles draw – Doubles draw	(China) Sun Shengnan (China) Xu Yifan; 6–0 6–3	(Czech Republic) Karolína Plíšková (Czech Republic) Kristýna Plíšková	(Japan) Sachie Ishizu (China) Sun Shengnan	(United Kingdom) Melanie South (South Korea) Kim So-jung (South Korea) Lee Jin-a (Japan) Kotomi Takahata
May 10	2010 Sparta Prague Open; Prague, Czech Republic; Clay $50,000; Singles draw – Doubles draw	(Czech Republic) Lucie Hradecká; 6–1 7–6(4)	(Croatia) Ajla Tomljanović	(Italy) Corinna Dentoni (Russia) Ksenia Pervak	(Czech Republic) Petra Cetkovská (Australia) Jelena Dokić (Slovenia) Maša Zec Peškirič (Czech Republic) Sandra Záhlavová
May 10	2010 Sparta Prague Open; Prague, Czech Republic; Clay $50,000; Singles draw – Doubles draw	(Russia) Ksenia Lykina (Slovenia) Maša Zec Peškirič; 6–3 6–4	(Czech Republic) Petra Cetkovská (Czech Republic) Eva Hrdinová	(Italy) Corinna Dentoni (Russia) Ksenia Pervak	(Czech Republic) Petra Cetkovská (Australia) Jelena Dokić (Slovenia) Maša Zec Peškirič (Czech Republic) Sandra Záhlavová
May 10	2010 Professional Women's 50K Tournament; Raleigh, North Carolina, United States; Clay $50,000; Singles draw – Doubles draw	(Australia) Johanna Konta; 6–2 5–7 6–4	(United States) Lindsay Lee-Waters	(Croatia) Mirjana Lučić (United States) Alison Riske	(Canada) Stéphanie Dubois (United States) Ahsha Rolle (Russia) Alina Jidkova (United States) Carly Gullickson
May 10	2010 Professional Women's 50K Tournament; Raleigh, North Carolina, United States; Clay $50,000; Singles draw – Doubles draw	(United States) Kristie Ahn (United States) Nicole Gibbs; 6–3 6–2	(United States) Alexandra Mueller (United States) Ahsha Rolle	(Croatia) Mirjana Lučić (United States) Alison Riske	(Canada) Stéphanie Dubois (United States) Ahsha Rolle (Russia) Alina Jidkova (United States) Carly Gullickson
May 10	Tanjung Selor, Indonesia; Hard $25,000; Singles draw – Doubles draw	(Austria) Melanie Klaffner; 6–3 7–6(1)	(Hong Kong) Zhang Ling	(China) Duan Yingying (South Korea) Han Sung-hee	(Thailand) Nudnida Luangnam (Indonesia) Sandy Gumulya (Indonesia) Lavinia Tananta (Uzbekistan) Sabina Sharipova
May 10	Tanjung Selor, Indonesia; Hard $25,000; Singles draw – Doubles draw	(China) Liu Wanting (Hong Kong) Zhang Ling; 7–6(5) 6–3	(Thailand) Noppawan Lertcheewakarn (Indonesia) Jessy Rompies	(China) Duan Yingying (South Korea) Han Sung-hee	(Thailand) Nudnida Luangnam (Indonesia) Sandy Gumulya (Indonesia) Lavinia Tananta (Uzbekistan) Sabina Sharipova
May 10	Rio de Janeiro, Brazil; Clay $25,000; Singles draw – Doubles draw	(France) Olivia Sanchez; 6–4 6–3	(Peru) Bianca Botto	(Brazil) Fernanda Hermenegildo (Argentina) Florencia Molinero	(Brazil) Roxane Vaisemberg (Brazil) Maria Fernanda Alves (Spain) María Teresa Torró Flor (Argentina) Mailen Auroux
May 10	Rio de Janeiro, Brazil; Clay $25,000; Singles draw – Doubles draw	(Brazil) Maria Fernanda Alves (Argentina) Florencia Molinero; 6–2 6–4	(Argentina) Mailen Auroux (Brazil) Fernanda Hermenegildo	(Brazil) Fernanda Hermenegildo (Argentina) Florencia Molinero	(Brazil) Roxane Vaisemberg (Brazil) Maria Fernanda Alves (Spain) María Teresa Torró Flor (Argentina) Mailen Auroux
May 10	Caserta, Italy; Clay $25,000; Singles draw – Doubles draw	(Italy) Romina Oprandi; 6–3 6–3	(United States) Sloane Stephens	(France) Irena Pavlovic (Ukraine) Irina Buryachok	(France) Estelle Guisard (Kyrgyzstan) Ksenia Palkina (Romania) Liana Ungur (Italy) Anna-Giulia Remondina
May 10	Caserta, Italy; Clay $25,000; Singles draw – Doubles draw	(Belarus) Ekaterina Dzehalevich (France) Irena Pavlovic; 6–3 6–3	(Italy) Nicole Clerico (Canada) Rebecca Marino	(France) Irena Pavlovic (Ukraine) Irina Buryachok	(France) Estelle Guisard (Kyrgyzstan) Ksenia Palkina (Romania) Liana Ungur (Italy) Anna-Giulia Remondina
May 10	Tortosa, Spain; Clay $10,000; Singles draw – Doubles draw	(France) Victoria Larrière; 7–5 4–6 6–4	(Belgium) An-Sophie Mestach	(Italy) Benedetta Davato (Belgium) Sofie Oyen	(Russia) Natalia Orlova (Morocco) Fatima El Allami (Spain) Arabela Fernández Rabener (Spain) Alejandra Sala Juste
May 10	Tortosa, Spain; Clay $10,000; Singles draw – Doubles draw	(Chile) Camila Silva (Russia) Avgusta Tsybysheva; 6–1 6–3	(Spain) Montserrat Blasco Fernández (Spain) Arabela Fernández Rabener	(Italy) Benedetta Davato (Belgium) Sofie Oyen	(Russia) Natalia Orlova (Morocco) Fatima El Allami (Spain) Arabela Fernández Rabener (Spain) Alejandra Sala Juste
May 17	Karuizawa, Nagano, Japan; Carpet $25,000; Singles draw – Doubles draw	(Japan) Natsumi Hamamura; 6–1 6–2	(China) Xu Yifan	(Japan) Kumiko Iijima (Chinese Taipei) Hsu Wen-hsin	(South Korea) Lee Jin-a (Japan) Akiko Yonemura (China) Wang Qiang (South Korea) Kim So-jung
May 17	Karuizawa, Nagano, Japan; Carpet $25,000; Singles draw – Doubles draw	(Japan) Ayumi Oka (Japan) Akiko Yonemura; 7–6(1) 6–3	(China) Sun Shengnan (China) Xu Yifan	(Japan) Kumiko Iijima (Chinese Taipei) Hsu Wen-hsin	(South Korea) Lee Jin-a (Japan) Akiko Yonemura (China) Wang Qiang (South Korea) Kim So-jung
May 17	Kharkiv, Ukraine; Clay $25,000; Singles draw – Doubles draw	(Ukraine) Lyudmyla Kichenok; 6–2 4–6 6–1	(Ukraine) Elina Svitolina	(Ukraine) Kateryna Kozlova (Austria) Janina Toljan	(Russia) Elena Kulikova (Austria) Tina Schiechtl (Ukraine) Alyona Sotnikova (Ukraine) Nadiia Kichenok
May 17	Kharkiv, Ukraine; Clay $25,000; Singles draw – Doubles draw	(Ukraine) Katerina Avdiyenko (Belarus) Ksenia Milevskaya; 6–4 6–2	(Ukraine) Lyudmyla Kichenok (Ukraine) Nadiia Kichenok	(Ukraine) Kateryna Kozlova (Austria) Janina Toljan	(Russia) Elena Kulikova (Austria) Tina Schiechtl (Ukraine) Alyona Sotnikova (Ukraine) Nadiia Kichenok
May 17	Moscow, Russia; Clay $25,000; Singles draw – Doubles draw	(Serbia) Aleksandra Krunić; 6–4 4–6 6–2	(Russia) Natalia Ryzhonkova	(Slovenia) Tadeja Majerič (Russia) Viktoria Kamenskaya	(Russia) Avgusta Tsybysheva (Russia) Eugeniya Pashkova (Russia) Valeriya Solovyeva (Russia) Daria Kuchmina
May 17	Moscow, Russia; Clay $25,000; Singles draw – Doubles draw	(Russia) Anna Arina Marenko (Russia) Ekaterina Yakovleva; 6–2 6–2	(Serbia) Aleksandra Krunić (Russia) Marina Shamayko	(Slovenia) Tadeja Majerič (Russia) Viktoria Kamenskaya	(Russia) Avgusta Tsybysheva (Russia) Eugeniya Pashkova (Russia) Valeriya Solovyeva (Russia) Daria Kuchmina
May 17	Rivoli, Italy; Clay $10,000; Singles draw – Doubles draw	(Morocco) Nadia Lalami; 6–4 6–2	(Italy) Verdiana Verardi	(Switzerland) Lara Michel (Bulgaria) Martina Gledacheva	(Italy) Valentina Sulpizio (Germany) Vanessa Henke (Serbia) Milana Špremo (Italy) Annalisa Bona
May 17	Rivoli, Italy; Clay $10,000; Singles draw – Doubles draw	(Italy) Stefania Chieppa (Italy) Valentina Sulpizio; 7–6(1) 6–1	(Italy) Stefania Fadabini (Italy) Alice Moroni	(Switzerland) Lara Michel (Bulgaria) Martina Gledacheva	(Italy) Valentina Sulpizio (Germany) Vanessa Henke (Serbia) Milana Špremo (Italy) Annalisa Bona
May 17	Bucharest, Romania; Clay $10,000; Singles draw – Doubles draw	(Romania) Alexandra Cadanțu; 6–2 6–4	(Romania) Diana Enache	(Romania) Laura-Ioana Andrei (Romania) Cristina Mitu	(Italy) Alice Balducci (Bulgaria) Dessislava Mladenova (Belgium) An-Sophie Mestach (Romania) Ionela-Andreea Iova
May 17	Bucharest, Romania; Clay $10,000; Singles draw – Doubles draw	(Romania) Laura-Ioana Andrei (Romania) Mădălina Gojnea; 6–4 3–6 [10–7]	(Romania) Diana Enache (Romania) Cristina Mitu	(Romania) Laura-Ioana Andrei (Romania) Cristina Mitu	(Italy) Alice Balducci (Bulgaria) Dessislava Mladenova (Belgium) An-Sophie Mestach (Romania) Ionela-Andreea Iova
May 17	Sunchang, South Korea; Hard $10,000; Singles draw – Doubles draw	(South Korea) Lee Ye-ra; 7–5 6–1	(South Korea) Kim Na-ri	(South Korea) Yoo Mi (South Korea) Yu Min-Hwa	(Chinese Taipei) Chan Chin-wei (South Korea) Chang Kyung-mi (South Korea) Hong Hyun-Hui (South Korea) Kim Kun-Hee
May 17	Sunchang, South Korea; Hard $10,000; Singles draw – Doubles draw	(South Korea) Kim Kun-Hee (South Korea) Yu Min-Hwa; 6–7(5) 6–4 [10–4]	(South Korea) Chang Kyung-mi (South Korea) Lee Ye-ra	(South Korea) Yoo Mi (South Korea) Yu Min-Hwa	(Chinese Taipei) Chan Chin-wei (South Korea) Chang Kyung-mi (South Korea) Hong Hyun-Hui (South Korea) Kim Kun-Hee
May 17	Durban, South Africa; Hard $10,000; Singles draw – Doubles draw	(South Africa) Chanel Simmonds; 6–1 6–4	(India) Poojashree Venkatesha	(Denmark) Malou Ejdesgaard (Czech Republic) Zuzana Linhová	(Austria) Nicole Rottmann (South Africa) Natasha Fourouclas (India) Rushmi Chakravarthi (Australia) Daniela Scivetti
May 17	Durban, South Africa; Hard $10,000; Singles draw – Doubles draw	(India) Sanaa Bhambri (India) Rushmi Chakravarthi; 3–6 6–3 [10–4]	(South Africa) Tegan Edwards (South Africa) Bianca Swanepoel	(Denmark) Malou Ejdesgaard (Czech Republic) Zuzana Linhová	(Austria) Nicole Rottmann (South Africa) Natasha Fourouclas (India) Rushmi Chakravarthi (Australia) Daniela Scivetti
May 17	Landisville, Pennsylvania, United States; Hard $10,000; Singles draw – Doubles draw	(United States) Alexandra Mueller; 6–2 5–7 6–0	(United States) Kyle McPhillips	(United States) Robin Anderson (Ukraine) Anastasia Kharchenko	(United States) Ellen Tsay (Russia) Angelina Gabueva (United States) Elizabeth Lumpkin (Russia) Yana Koroleva
May 17	Landisville, Pennsylvania, United States; Hard $10,000; Singles draw – Doubles draw	(United States) Gail Brodsky (United States) Alexandra Mueller; 4–6 7–5 [10–2]	(New Zealand) Dianne Hollands (Australia) Tiffany Welford	(United States) Robin Anderson (Ukraine) Anastasia Kharchenko	(United States) Ellen Tsay (Russia) Angelina Gabueva (United States) Elizabeth Lumpkin (Russia) Yana Koroleva
May 24	2010 USTA LA Tennis Open USTA Men's & Women's Challenger; Carson, United States; Hard $50,000; Singles draw – Doubles draw	(United States) CoCo Vandeweghe; 6–1 6–3	(United States) Kristie Ahn	(United States) Lindsay Lee-Waters (Slovenia) Petra Rampre	(United States) Krista Hardebeck (Russia) Alina Jidkova (United States) Ahsha Rolle (United States) Asia Muhammad
May 24	2010 USTA LA Tennis Open USTA Men's & Women's Challenger; Carson, United States; Hard $50,000; Singles draw – Doubles draw	(United States) Lindsay Lee-Waters (United States) Megan Moulton-Levy; 6–1 6–2	(United States) Christina Fusano (United States) Courtney Nagle	(United States) Lindsay Lee-Waters (Slovenia) Petra Rampre	(United States) Krista Hardebeck (Russia) Alina Jidkova (United States) Ahsha Rolle (United States) Asia Muhammad
May 24	Kusatsu, Shiga, Japan; Carpet $25,000; Singles draw – Doubles draw	(Japan) Akiko Yonemura; 6–4 7–6(4)	(Japan) Junri Namigata	(Japan) Ayaka Maekawa (Japan) Shuko Aoyama	(Japan) Mari Inoue (Japan) Ai Yamamoto (Chinese Taipei) Hsu Wen-hsin (Japan) Shiho Akita
May 24	Kusatsu, Shiga, Japan; Carpet $25,000; Singles draw – Doubles draw	(Japan) Kumiko Iijima (Japan) Tomoko Yonemura; 6–7(5) 6–4 [10–8]	(Japan) Maya Kato (Japan) Ayaka Maekawa	(Japan) Ayaka Maekawa (Japan) Shuko Aoyama	(Japan) Mari Inoue (Japan) Ai Yamamoto (Chinese Taipei) Hsu Wen-hsin (Japan) Shiho Akita
May 24	Goyang, South Korea; Hard $25,000; Singles draw – Doubles draw	(South Korea) Kim Na-ri; 6–4 6–4	(South Korea) Lee Jin-a	(Japan) Remi Tezuka (South Korea) Yu Min-Hwa	(Japan) Miki Miyamura (South Korea) Lee Ye-ra (South Korea) Kim Kun-Hee (South Korea) Kim So-jung
May 24	Goyang, South Korea; Hard $25,000; Singles draw – Doubles draw	(South Korea) Kim Kun-Hee (South Korea) Yu Min-Hwa; 6–4 6–4	(South Korea) Chang Kyung-mi (South Korea) Lee Jin-a	(Japan) Remi Tezuka (South Korea) Yu Min-Hwa	(Japan) Miki Miyamura (South Korea) Lee Ye-ra (South Korea) Kim Kun-Hee (South Korea) Kim So-jung
May 24	Grado, Italy; Clay $25,000; Singles draw – Doubles draw	(Georgia (country)) Anna Tatishvili; 6–7(3) 6–3 6–4	(Serbia) Ana Jovanović	(Spain) Estrella Cabeza Candela (Italy) Julia Mayr	(Germany) Julia Schruff (Russia) Elena Bovina (Russia) Alexandra Panova (United States) Sloane Stephens
May 24	Grado, Italy; Clay $25,000; Singles draw – Doubles draw	(China) Han Xinyun (China) Lu Jingjing; 1–6 6–4 [10–8]	(Russia) Karina Pimkina (Russia) Marta Sirotkina	(Spain) Estrella Cabeza Candela (Italy) Julia Mayr	(Germany) Julia Schruff (Russia) Elena Bovina (Russia) Alexandra Panova (United States) Sloane Stephens
May 24	İzmir, Turkey; Hard $25,000; Singles draw – Doubles draw	(Austria) Tamira Paszek; 6–2 6–3	(Turkey) Çağla Büyükakçay	(Greece) Irini Georgatou (Ukraine) Ganna Piven	(Romania) Irina-Camelia Begu (Germany) Annika Beck (Russia) Valeria Savinykh (Germany) Sarah Gronert
May 24	İzmir, Turkey; Hard $25,000; Singles draw – Doubles draw	(Brazil) Maria Fernanda Alves (Austria) Tamira Paszek; 6–1 6–2	(Turkey) Çağla Büyükakçay (Turkey) Pemra Özgen	(Greece) Irini Georgatou (Ukraine) Ganna Piven	(Romania) Irina-Camelia Begu (Germany) Annika Beck (Russia) Valeria Savinykh (Germany) Sarah Gronert
May 24	Velenje, Slovenia; Clay $10,000; Singles draw – Doubles draw	(Liechtenstein) Stephanie Vogt; 6–1 6–2	(Czech Republic) Pavla Smidová	(Serbia) Barbara Bonić (Slovenia) Diana Nakič	(Hungary) Zsófia Susányi (Italy) Nicole Clerico (Czech Republic) Tereza Hladíková (Slovakia) Michaela Hončová
May 24	Velenje, Slovenia; Clay $10,000; Singles draw – Doubles draw	(Australia) Alenka Hubacek (Australia) Tammi Patterson; 6–1 3–6 [10–8]	(Czech Republic) Kateřina Kramperová (Czech Republic) Pavla Smidová	(Serbia) Barbara Bonić (Slovenia) Diana Nakič	(Hungary) Zsófia Susányi (Italy) Nicole Clerico (Czech Republic) Tereza Hladíková (Slovakia) Michaela Hončová
May 24	Craiova, Romania; Clay $10,000; Singles draw – Doubles draw	(Romania) Alexandra Cadanțu; 5–7 6–3 6–0	(Romania) Mădălina Gojnea	(Spain) Lucía Cervera Vázquez (Romania) Cristina Mitu	(Romania) Diana Enache (Romania) Alexandra Damaschin (Russia) Julia Parasyuk (Bulgaria) Dalia Zafirova
May 24	Craiova, Romania; Clay $10,000; Singles draw – Doubles draw	(Romania) Alexandra Cadanțu (Romania) Alexandra Damaschin; 6–3 6–3	(Bulgaria) Tanya Germanlieva (Bulgaria) Dessislava Mladenova	(Spain) Lucía Cervera Vázquez (Romania) Cristina Mitu	(Romania) Diana Enache (Romania) Alexandra Damaschin (Russia) Julia Parasyuk (Bulgaria) Dalia Zafirova
May 24	Olecko, Poland; Clay $10,000; Singles draw – Doubles draw	(Netherlands) Marcella Koek; 6–3 6–3	(Poland) Barbara Sobaszkiewicz	(Czech Republic) Martina Kubičíková (Poland) Olga Brózda	(Romania) Patricia Chirea (United Kingdom) Jennifer Allan (Latvia) Lina Lileikite (Poland) Joanna Nalborska
May 24	Olecko, Poland; Clay $10,000; Singles draw – Doubles draw	(Czech Republic) Martina Borecká (Czech Republic) Martina Kubičíková; 6–3 6–1	(Slovakia) Martina Frantová (Slovakia) Simonka Parajová	(Czech Republic) Martina Kubičíková (Poland) Olga Brózda	(Romania) Patricia Chirea (United Kingdom) Jennifer Allan (Latvia) Lina Lileikite (Poland) Joanna Nalborska
May 24	Ra'anana, Israel; Hard $10,000; Singles draw – Doubles draw	(Israel) Julia Glushko; 6–1 6–3	(Israel) Keren Shlomo	(Russia) Elina Gasanova (Israel) Liat Zimmermann	(Russia) Karina Isayan (Belgium) Valerie Verhamme (Israel) Chen Astrogo (Israel) Valeria Patiuk
May 24	Ra'anana, Israel; Hard $10,000; Singles draw – Doubles draw	(Israel) Julia Glushko (Israel) Keren Shlomo; 3–6 7–6(6) [10–3]	(Israel) Efrat Mishor (Russia) Anna Rapoport	(Russia) Elina Gasanova (Israel) Liat Zimmermann	(Russia) Karina Isayan (Belgium) Valerie Verhamme (Israel) Chen Astrogo (Israel) Valeria Patiuk
May 24	Durban, South Africa; Hard $10,000; Singles draw – Doubles draw	(South Africa) Chanel Simmonds; 6–1 6–4	(Australia) Daniela Scivetti	(South Africa) Bianca Swanepoel (India) Rushmi Chakravarthi	(India) Poojashree Venkatesha (Ukraine) Khristina Kazimova (Czech Republic) Zuzana Linhova (Slovakia) Zuzana Luknárová
May 24	Durban, South Africa; Hard $10,000; Singles draw – Doubles draw	(Austria) Nicole Rottmann (Hungary) Blanka Szávay; 3–6 7–5 [11–9]	(India) Sanaa Bhambri (India) Rushmi Chakravarthi	(South Africa) Bianca Swanepoel (India) Rushmi Chakravarthi	(India) Poojashree Venkatesha (Ukraine) Khristina Kazimova (Czech Republic) Zuzana Linhova (Slovakia) Zuzana Luknárová
May 24	2010 Palmetto Pro Open; Sumter, South Carolina, United States; Hard $10,000; Singles draw – Doubles draw	(Croatia) Jelena Pandžić; 6–2 1–6 6–2	(United States) Alexis King	(Finland) Piia Suomalainen (United States) Gira Schofield	(Russia) Yana Koroleva (United Kingdom) Nicole Slater (United States) Alexandra Mueller (United States) Nicole Melichar
May 24	2010 Palmetto Pro Open; Sumter, South Carolina, United States; Hard $10,000; Singles draw – Doubles draw	(United States) Alexandra Mueller (United States) Ashley Weinhold; 6–1 6–3	(United States) Alexandra Leatu (United States) Nicole Melichar	(Finland) Piia Suomalainen (United States) Gira Schofield	(Russia) Yana Koroleva (United Kingdom) Nicole Slater (United States) Alexandra Mueller (United States) Nicole Melichar
May 31	Torneo Internazionale Femminile Antico Tiro a Volo; Rome, Italy; Clay $50,000; Singles draw – Doubles draw	(Spain) Lourdes Domínguez Lino; 5–7 6–3 6–3	(Italy) Romina Oprandi	(Netherlands) Arantxa Rus (Italy) Maria Elena Camerin	(Russia) Elena Chalova (Australia) Sophie Ferguson (Italy) Corinna Dentoni (United States) Christina McHale
May 31	Torneo Internazionale Femminile Antico Tiro a Volo; Rome, Italy; Clay $50,000; Singles draw – Doubles draw	(United States) Christina McHale (Australia) Olivia Rogowska; 6–4 6–1	(Belarus) Iryna Kuryanovich (Netherlands) Arantxa Rus	(Netherlands) Arantxa Rus (Italy) Maria Elena Camerin	(Russia) Elena Chalova (Australia) Sophie Ferguson (Italy) Corinna Dentoni (United States) Christina McHale
May 31	Maribor, Slovenia; Clay $50,000; Singles draw – Doubles draw	(China) Zhang Shuai; 6–3 3–6 6–3	(Spain) Laura Pous Tió	(Russia) Ksenia Pervak (Serbia) Bojana Jovanovski	(Czech Republic) Renata Voráčová (Russia) Evgeniya Rodina (Slovenia) Maša Zec Peškirič (Russia) Alexandra Panova
May 31	Maribor, Slovenia; Clay $50,000; Singles draw – Doubles draw	(Slovenia) Andreja Klepač (Slovenia) Tadeja Majerič; 6–3 7–6(6)	(Russia) Alexandra Panova (Russia) Ksenia Pervak	(Russia) Ksenia Pervak (Serbia) Bojana Jovanovski	(Czech Republic) Renata Voráčová (Russia) Evgeniya Rodina (Slovenia) Maša Zec Peškirič (Russia) Alexandra Panova
May 31	Aegon Trophy; Nottingham, United Kingdom; Grass $50,000; Singles draw – Doubles draw	(United Kingdom) Elena Baltacha; 6–2, 6–2	(United States) Carly Gullickson	(China) Han Xinyun (Czech Republic) Sandra Záhlavová	(Thailand) Noppawan Lertcheewakarn (United States) Alison Riske (United States) Madison Brengle (United Kingdom) Anne Keothavong
May 31	Aegon Trophy; Nottingham, United Kingdom; Grass $50,000; Singles draw – Doubles draw	(United Kingdom) Sarah Borwell (United States) Raquel Kops-Jones; 6–3 2–6 [10–7]	(United Kingdom) Naomi Broady (United Kingdom) Katie O'Brien	(China) Han Xinyun (Czech Republic) Sandra Záhlavová	(Thailand) Noppawan Lertcheewakarn (United States) Alison Riske (United States) Madison Brengle (United Kingdom) Anne Keothavong
May 31	Bukhara, Uzbekistan; Hard $25,000; Singles draw – Doubles draw	(Greece) Irini Georgatou; 1–6 6–0 6–3	(Georgia (country)) Sofia Shapatava	(Russia) Elena Kulikova (Israel) Julia Glushko	(Georgia (country)) Ekaterine Gorgodze (Russia) Daria Kuchmina (Ukraine) Ganna Piven (Georgia (country)) Tatia Mikadze
May 31	Bukhara, Uzbekistan; Hard $25,000; Singles draw – Doubles draw	(Georgia (country)) Tatia Mikadze (Georgia (country)) Sofia Shapatava; 6–3 6–3	(Indonesia) Yayuk Basuki (Indonesia) Jessy Rompies	(Russia) Elena Kulikova (Israel) Julia Glushko	(Georgia (country)) Ekaterine Gorgodze (Russia) Daria Kuchmina (Ukraine) Ganna Piven (Georgia (country)) Tatia Mikadze
May 31	Brno, Czech Republic; Clay $25,000; Singles draw – Doubles draw	(Czech Republic) Zuzana Ondrášková; 6–3 4–6 6–2	(Slovakia) Kristína Kučová	(Slovakia) Lenka Juríková (Belarus) Darya Kustova	(China) Lu Jingjing (Czech Republic) Tereza Hladíková (Czech Republic) Eva Birnerová (Argentina) Florencia Molinero
May 31	Brno, Czech Republic; Clay $25,000; Singles draw – Doubles draw	(Germany) Carmen Klaschka (Germany) Laura Siegemund; Walkover	(Belarus) Darya Kustova (Ukraine) Lesia Tsurenko	(Slovakia) Lenka Juríková (Belarus) Darya Kustova	(China) Lu Jingjing (Czech Republic) Tereza Hladíková (Czech Republic) Eva Birnerová (Argentina) Florencia Molinero
May 31	Sarajevo, Bosnia and Herzegovina; Clay $25,000; Singles draw – Doubles draw	(Romania) Liana Ungur; 6–3 6–0	(France) Irena Pavlovic	(Germany) Sarah Gronert (Ukraine) Irina Buryachok	(Romania) Elena Bogdan (Bulgaria) Dia Evtimova (France) Mathilde Johansson (Croatia) Ana Vrljić
May 31	Sarajevo, Bosnia and Herzegovina; Clay $25,000; Singles draw – Doubles draw	(Ukraine) Irina Buryachok (France) Irena Pavlovic; 6–1 6–1	(Italy) Nicole Clerico (Poland) Karolina Kosińska	(Germany) Sarah Gronert (Ukraine) Irina Buryachok	(Romania) Elena Bogdan (Bulgaria) Dia Evtimova (France) Mathilde Johansson (Croatia) Ana Vrljić
May 31	Galatina, Italy; Clay $10,000; Singles draw – Doubles draw	(Germany) Anne Schäfer; 4–6 6–3 6–1	(Switzerland) Lara Michel	(Italy) Carolina Pillot (Bulgaria) Martina Gledacheva	(Italy) Anastasia Grymalska (Italy) Alice Moroni (Belgium) Valerie Verhamme (Italy) Alice Balducci
May 31	Galatina, Italy; Clay $10,000; Singles draw – Doubles draw	(Bulgaria) Martina Gledacheva (Switzerland) Lisa Sabino; 6–4 6–1	(Italy) Alice Balducci (Italy) Francesca Palmigiano	(Italy) Carolina Pillot (Bulgaria) Martina Gledacheva	(Italy) Anastasia Grymalska (Italy) Alice Moroni (Belgium) Valerie Verhamme (Italy) Alice Balducci
May 31	Bucharest, Romania; Clay $10,000; Singles draw – Doubles draw	(Romania) Mădălina Gojnea; 6–2 6–2	(Romania) Bianca Hîncu	(Romania) Ionela-Andreea Iova (Romania) Alexandra Damaschin	(Romania) Elora Dabija (Spain) Carmen López Rueda (Romania) Ioana Gașpar (Romania) Patricia Maria Țig
May 31	Bucharest, Romania; Clay $10,000; Singles draw – Doubles draw	(Romania) Laura-Ioana Andrei (Romania) Mădălina Gojnea; 6–2 6–4	(Romania) Elora Dabija (Romania) Ioana Gașpar	(Romania) Ionela-Andreea Iova (Romania) Alexandra Damaschin	(Romania) Elora Dabija (Spain) Carmen López Rueda (Romania) Ioana Gașpar (Romania) Patricia Maria Țig
May 31	Komoro, Nagano, Japan; Clay $10,000; Singles draw – Doubles draw	(Japan) Sachie Ishizu; 6–0 6–1	(Japan) Miyabi Inoue	(Japan) Ayumi Oka (China) Liang Chen	(South Korea) Chang Kyung-mi (South Korea) Hong Hyun-Hui (Japan) Yurina Koshino (South Korea) Yoo Mi
May 31	Komoro, Nagano, Japan; Clay $10,000; Singles draw – Doubles draw	(Japan) Shuko Aoyama (Japan) Maya Kato; 2–6 6–2 [11–9]	(South Korea) Kim Kun-Hee (South Korea) Yu Min-Hwa	(Japan) Ayumi Oka (China) Liang Chen	(South Korea) Chang Kyung-mi (South Korea) Hong Hyun-Hui (Japan) Yurina Koshino (South Korea) Yoo Mi
May 31	Hilton Head Island, United States; Hard $10,000; Singles draw – Doubles draw	(United States) Alexis King; 6–2 6–2	(United States) Jacqueline Cako	(Russia) Yana Koroleva (Australia) Isabella Holland	(United States) Alexandra Mueller (United States) Zoë Gwen Scandalis (United States) Megan Falcon (Croatia) Jelena Pandžić
May 31	Hilton Head Island, United States; Hard $10,000; Singles draw – Doubles draw	(United States) Jacqueline Cako (United States) Erica Krisan; 6–1 6–4	(United States) Brooke Bolender (United States) Lauren Herring	(Russia) Yana Koroleva (Australia) Isabella Holland	(United States) Alexandra Mueller (United States) Zoë Gwen Scandalis (United States) Megan Falcon (Croatia) Jelena Pandžić
May 31	Cantanhede, Portugal; Grass $10,000; Singles draw – Doubles draw	(Australia) Shayna McDowell; 6–1 7–5	(Austria) Christine Kandler	(Russia) Diana Arutyunova (Russia) Elina Gasanova	(Romania) Patricia Chirea (Portugal) Sofia Araujo (Spain) Nuria Párrizas Díaz (Bulgaria) Julia Stamatova
May 31	Cantanhede, Portugal; Grass $10,000; Singles draw – Doubles draw	(Russia) Elina Gasanova (Russia) Julia Parasyuk; 7–6(0) 6–1	(Russia) Daria Kirpicheva (Spain) Carolina Prats Millán	(Russia) Diana Arutyunova (Russia) Elina Gasanova	(Romania) Patricia Chirea (Portugal) Sofia Araujo (Spain) Nuria Párrizas Díaz (Bulgaria) Julia Stamatova
May 31	São Paulo, Brazil; Clay $10,000; Singles draw – Doubles draw	(Brazil) Nathalia Rossi; 6–4 6–3	(Brazil) Roxane Vaisemberg	(Brazil) Fernanda Faria (Brazil) Paula Cristina Gonçalves	(Brazil) Monique Albuquerque (Peru) Mariana Demichelli Vergara (Brazil) Fernanda Hermenegildo (Colombia) Paula Catalina Robles García
May 31	São Paulo, Brazil; Clay $10,000; Singles draw – Doubles draw	(Canada) Ekaterina Shulaeva (Brazil) Roxane Vaisemberg; 6–3 6–3	(Brazil) Fernanda Faria (Brazil) Paula Cristina Gonçalves	(Brazil) Fernanda Faria (Brazil) Paula Cristina Gonçalves	(Brazil) Monique Albuquerque (Peru) Mariana Demichelli Vergara (Brazil) Fernanda Hermenegildo (Colombia) Paula Catalina Robles García

== June ==
Week of	Tournament	Winner	Runners-up	Semifinalists	Quarterfinalists
June 7	Open GDF Suez de Marseille; Marseille, France; Clay $100,000+H; Singles draw – Doubles draw	(Czech Republic) Klára Zakopalová; 6–3, 6–3	(Sweden) Johanna Larsson	(United States) Varvara Lepchenko (Czech Republic) Barbora Záhlavová-Strýcová	(Croatia) Petra Martić (France) Nathalie Piquion (Australia) Jelena Dokić (Romania) Edina Gallovits
June 7	Open GDF Suez de Marseille; Marseille, France; Clay $100,000+H; Singles draw – Doubles draw	(Sweden) Johanna Larsson (Austria) Yvonne Meusburger; 6–4, 6–2	(France) Stéphanie Cohen-Aloro (France) Aurélie Védy	(United States) Varvara Lepchenko (Czech Republic) Barbora Záhlavová-Strýcová	(Croatia) Petra Martić (France) Nathalie Piquion (Australia) Jelena Dokić (Romania) Edina Gallovits
June 7	Smart Card Open Monet+ Zlín, Czech Republic; Clay $50,000+H; Singles draw – Doubles draw	(Austria) Patricia Mayr; 6–1, 6–2	(Italy) Corinna Dentoni	(Czech Republic) Zuzana Ondrášková (France) Stéphanie Foretz	(Ukraine) Lesia Tsurenko (Belarus) Darya Kustova (Spain) Estrella Cabeza Candela (United States) Christina McHale
June 7	Smart Card Open Monet+ Zlín, Czech Republic; Clay $50,000+H; Singles draw – Doubles draw	(Czech Republic) Eva Birnerová (France) Stéphanie Foretz; 7–5, 4–6, [10–6]	(Czech Republic) Tereza Hladíková (Slovakia) Michaela Pochabová	(Czech Republic) Zuzana Ondrášková (France) Stéphanie Foretz	(Ukraine) Lesia Tsurenko (Belarus) Darya Kustova (Spain) Estrella Cabeza Candela (United States) Christina McHale
June 7	Szczecin, Poland; Clay $25,000; Singles draw – Doubles draw	(Poland) Magda Linette; 6–2, 6–0	(Estonia) Margit Rüütel	(Romania) Ágnes Szatmári (Czech Republic) Petra Cetkovská	(Russia) Natalia Ryzhonkova (Poland) Katarzyna Piter (Poland) Paula Kania (Slovakia) Zuzana Luknárová
June 7	Szczecin, Poland; Clay $25,000; Singles draw – Doubles draw	(Czech Republic) Petra Cetkovská (Czech Republic) Eva Hrdinová; 7–6(5), 6–3	(Ukraine) Veronika Kapshay (Germany) Justine Ozga	(Romania) Ágnes Szatmári (Czech Republic) Petra Cetkovská	(Russia) Natalia Ryzhonkova (Poland) Katarzyna Piter (Poland) Paula Kania (Slovakia) Zuzana Luknárová
June 7	El Paso, United States; Hard $25,000; Singles draw – Doubles draw	(United States) CoCo Vandeweghe; 6–2, 6–1	(Japan) Ryōko Fuda	(Australia) Johanna Konta (United States) Kimberly Couts	(United States) Mashona Washington (United States) Ahsha Rolle (United States) Lindsay Lee-Waters (United States) Elizabeth Lumpkin
June 7	El Paso, United States; Hard $25,000; Singles draw – Doubles draw	(United States) Angela Haynes (United States) Ahsha Rolle; 6–3, 6–7(5), [10–7]	(United States) Lindsay Lee-Waters (United States) Ashley Weinhold	(Australia) Johanna Konta (United States) Kimberly Couts	(United States) Mashona Washington (United States) Ahsha Rolle (United States) Lindsay Lee-Waters (United States) Elizabeth Lumpkin
June 7	Campobasso, Italy; Clay $25,000; Singles draw – Doubles draw	(Argentina) María Irigoyen; 6–2, 7–6(5)	(France) Laura Thorpe	(Italy) Gioia Barbieri (Georgia (country)) Margalita Chakhnashvili	(Italy) Giulia Gatto-Monticone (Russia) Yuliya Kalabina (Portugal) Maria João Koehler (Ukraine) Anastasiya Vasylyeva
June 7	Campobasso, Italy; Clay $25,000; Singles draw – Doubles draw	(Ukraine) Yuliana Fedak (Ukraine) Anastasiya Vasylyeva; 2–6, 6–3, [10–7]	(Argentina) María Irigoyen (France) Laura Thorpe	(Italy) Gioia Barbieri (Georgia (country)) Margalita Chakhnashvili	(Italy) Giulia Gatto-Monticone (Russia) Yuliya Kalabina (Portugal) Maria João Koehler (Ukraine) Anastasiya Vasylyeva
June 7	Budapest, Hungary; Clay $25,000; Singles draw – Doubles draw	(France) Mathilde Johansson; 6–7(4), 6–1, 6–0	(Hungary) Tímea Babos	(Argentina) Florencia Molinero (France) Claire Feuerstein	(Austria) Tina Schiechtl (Slovakia) Lenka Wienerová (France) Audrey Bergot (Italy) Evelyn Mayr
June 7	Budapest, Hungary; Clay $25,000; Singles draw – Doubles draw	(Serbia) Teodora Mirčić (Slovakia) Lenka Wienerová; 6–0, 6–2	(Germany) Anna Livadaru (Argentina) Florencia Molinero	(Argentina) Florencia Molinero (France) Claire Feuerstein	(Austria) Tina Schiechtl (Slovakia) Lenka Wienerová (France) Audrey Bergot (Italy) Evelyn Mayr
June 7	Qarshi, Uzbekistan; Hard $25,000; Singles draw – Doubles draw	(South Korea) Lee Jin-a; 6–2, 1–6, 6–4	(Uzbekistan) Sabina Sharipova	(Greece) Irini Georgatou (Indonesia) Lavinia Tananta	(Russia) Marta Sirotkina (South Korea) Han Sung-hee (South Korea) Kim Na-ri (Indonesia) Jessy Rompies
June 7	Qarshi, Uzbekistan; Hard $25,000; Singles draw – Doubles draw	(Russia) Natela Dzalamidze (Russia) Daria Kuchmina; 6–2 2–6, [11–9]	(Belarus) Ksenia Milevskaya (Ukraine) Ganna Piven	(Greece) Irini Georgatou (Indonesia) Lavinia Tananta	(Russia) Marta Sirotkina (South Korea) Han Sung-hee (South Korea) Kim Na-ri (Indonesia) Jessy Rompies
June 7	Apeldoorn, Netherlands; Clay $10,000; Singles draw – Doubles draw	(Netherlands) Angelique van der Meet; 7–5, 6–3	(Netherlands) Kiki Bertens	(United States) Grace Min (Netherlands) Leonie Mekel	(Bosnia and Herzegovina) Sandra Martinović (Germany) Lena-Marie Hofmann (Germany) Nina Zander (Netherlands) Bibiane Schoofs
June 7	Apeldoorn, Netherlands; Clay $10,000; Singles draw – Doubles draw	(Belgium) Elyne Boeykens (Netherlands) Leonie Mekel; 4–6, 6–3, [10–4]	(Germany) Carolin Daniels (Germany) Nina Zander	(United States) Grace Min (Netherlands) Leonie Mekel	(Bosnia and Herzegovina) Sandra Martinović (Germany) Lena-Marie Hofmann (Germany) Nina Zander (Netherlands) Bibiane Schoofs
June 7	Iași, Romania; Clay $10,000; Singles draw – Doubles draw	(Romania) Mădălina Gojnea; 6–2, 7–5	(Romania) Ilinca Stoica	(Romania) Sabina Lupu (Romania) Bianca Hîncu	(Bulgaria) Anastasia Stepu (Romania) Claudia Antonia Enache (Bulgaria) Martina Gledacheva (Romania) Raluca Elena Platon
June 7	Iași, Romania; Clay $10,000; Singles draw – Doubles draw	(Romania) Mădălina Gojnea (Romania) Ionela-Andreea Iova; 6–3, 6–3	(Oman) Fatma Al-Nabhani (Bulgaria) Biljana Pawlowa-Dimitrova	(Romania) Sabina Lupu (Romania) Bianca Hîncu	(Bulgaria) Anastasia Stepu (Romania) Claudia Antonia Enache (Bulgaria) Martina Gledacheva (Romania) Raluca Elena Platon
June 7	(Portugal) Amarante; Hard $10,000; Singles draw – Doubles draw	(Canada) Mélanie Gloria; 7–5, 6–7(6), 6–0	(Australia) Shayna McDowell	(Portugal) Magali de Lattre (Spain) Georgina García Pérez	(Australia) Jade Hopper (Czech Republic) Zuzana Linhová (Greece) Despina Papamichail (Russia) Julia Parasyuk
June 7	(Portugal) Amarante; Hard $10,000; Singles draw – Doubles draw	(Canada) Mélanie Gloria (Mexico) Daniela Múñoz Gallegos; 6–4, 6–2	(Portugal) Magali de Lattre (Australia) Jade Hopper	(Portugal) Magali de Lattre (Spain) Georgina García Pérez	(Australia) Jade Hopper (Czech Republic) Zuzana Linhová (Greece) Despina Papamichail (Russia) Julia Parasyuk
June 7	Córdoba, Argentina; Clay $10,000; Singles draw – Doubles draw	(Argentina) Mailen Auroux; 5–3, retired	(Argentina) Agustina Lepore	(Argentina) Paula Ormaechea (Venezuela) Gabriela Coglitore	(Argentina) Barbara Rush (Colombia) Karen Castiblanco (Argentina) Carolina Zeballos (Argentina) Luciana Sarmenti
June 7	Córdoba, Argentina; Clay $10,000; Singles draw – Doubles draw	(Argentina) Mailen Auroux (Colombia) Karen Castiblanco; 6–1, 6–2	(Argentina) Luciana Sarmenti (Argentina) Emilia Yorio	(Argentina) Paula Ormaechea (Venezuela) Gabriela Coglitore	(Argentina) Barbara Rush (Colombia) Karen Castiblanco (Argentina) Carolina Zeballos (Argentina) Luciana Sarmenti
June 7	Tokyo, Japan; Hard $10,000; Singles draw – Doubles draw	(Japan) Shuko Aoyama; 7–6(3), 6–3	(Japan) Erika Takao	(South Korea) Chang Kyung-mi (Japan) Miharu Imanishi	(Japan) Akari Inoue (Japan) Mari Tanaka (Japan) Ayaka Maekawa (Japan) Misa Eguchi
June 7	Tokyo, Japan; Hard $10,000; Singles draw – Doubles draw	(Japan) Shuko Aoyama (Japan) Akari Inoue; 7–6(3), 6–0	(South Korea) Chang Kyung-mi (South Korea) Yoo Mi	(South Korea) Chang Kyung-mi (Japan) Miharu Imanishi	(Japan) Akari Inoue (Japan) Mari Tanaka (Japan) Ayaka Maekawa (Japan) Misa Eguchi
June 7	Brasília, Brazil; Clay $10,000; Singles draw – Doubles draw	(Brazil) Fernanda Faria; 6–7(5), 6–3, 6–4	(Brazil) Paula Cristina Gonçalves	(Brazil) Eduarda Piai (Brazil) Nathaly Kurata	(Paraguay) Isabella Robiani (Brazil) Gabriella Barbosa-Costa Silva (Ecuador) Mariana Correa (Brazil) Monique Albuquerque
June 7	Brasília, Brazil; Clay $10,000; Singles draw – Doubles draw	(Brazil) Fernanda Faria (Brazil) Paula Cristina Gonçalves; 6–4, 6–4	(Brazil) Gabriella Barbosa-Costa Silva (Brazil) Natalia Cheng	(Brazil) Eduarda Piai (Brazil) Nathaly Kurata	(Paraguay) Isabella Robiani (Brazil) Gabriella Barbosa-Costa Silva (Ecuador) Mariana Correa (Brazil) Monique Albuquerque
June 14	2010 Open GDF Suez de Montpellier Agglomération Hérault; Montpellier, France; Clay $25,000; Singles draw – Doubles draw	(France) Mathilde Johansson; 5–7, 6–4, 6–2	(France) Claire de Gubernatis	(Serbia) Tamara Čurović (Germany) Laura Siegemund	(France) Irena Pavlovic (France) Stéphanie Foretz (Ukraine) Yuliya Beygelzimer (France) Myrtille Georges
June 14	2010 Open GDF Suez de Montpellier Agglomération Hérault; Montpellier, France; Clay $25,000; Singles draw – Doubles draw	(China) Lu Jingjing (Germany) Laura Siegemund; 6–4, 6–2	(France) Amandine Hesse (Ukraine) Lyudmyla Kichenok	(Serbia) Tamara Čurović (Germany) Laura Siegemund	(France) Irena Pavlovic (France) Stéphanie Foretz (Ukraine) Yuliya Beygelzimer (France) Myrtille Georges
June 14	Padua, Italy; Clay $25,000; Singles draw – Doubles draw	(Romania) Liana Ungur; 6–4, 6–4	(France) Audrey Bergot	(Italy) Anna Remondina (Italy) Julia Mayr	(Australia) Jessica Moore (Serbia) Aleksandra Krunić (Ukraine) Yuliana Fedak (Bosnia and Herzegovina) Sandra Martinović
June 14	Padua, Italy; Clay $25,000; Singles draw – Doubles draw	(Austria) Sandra Klemenschits (Slovenia) Andreja Klepač; 4–6, 6–4, [10–5]	(Italy) Claudia Giovine (Italy) Valentina Sulpizio	(Italy) Anna Remondina (Italy) Julia Mayr	(Australia) Jessica Moore (Serbia) Aleksandra Krunić (Ukraine) Yuliana Fedak (Bosnia and Herzegovina) Sandra Martinović
June 14	Buenos Aires, Argentina; Clay $10,000; Singles draw – Doubles draw	(Argentina) Mailen Auroux; 6–1, 7–5	(Argentina) Paula Ormaechea	(Argentina) Sofía Luini (Argentina) Aranza Salut	(Argentina) Tatiana Búa (Brazil) Monique Albuquerque (Argentina) Catalina Pella (Argentina) Luciana Sarmenti
June 14	Buenos Aires, Argentina; Clay $10,000; Singles draw – Doubles draw	(Argentina) Lucía Jara Lozano (Argentina) Guadalupe Pérez Rojas; 7–6(2), 1–0, Ret.	(Argentina) Mailen Auroux (Colombia) Karen Castiblanco	(Argentina) Sofía Luini (Argentina) Aranza Salut	(Argentina) Tatiana Búa (Brazil) Monique Albuquerque (Argentina) Catalina Pella (Argentina) Luciana Sarmenti
June 14	Cologne, Germany; Clay $10,000; Singles draw – Doubles draw	(Poland) Sandra Zaniewska; 6–4, 6–4	(Germany) Julia Babilon	(Turkey) Pemra Özgen (France) Océane Adam	(Ukraine) Katerina Avdiyenko (Switzerland) Conny Perrin (Serbia) Nataša Zorić (Germany) Mara Nowak
June 14	Cologne, Germany; Clay $10,000; Singles draw – Doubles draw	(Ukraine) Katerina Avdiyenko (Turkey) Pemra Özgen; 6–0, 6–2	(Germany) Sarah Urbanek (Germany) Alina Wessel	(Turkey) Pemra Özgen (France) Océane Adam	(Ukraine) Katerina Avdiyenko (Switzerland) Conny Perrin (Serbia) Nataša Zorić (Germany) Mara Nowak
June 14	Lenzerheide, Switzerland; Clay $10,000; Singles draw – Doubles draw	(Germany) Tanja Ostertag; 3–6, 7–6(7), 7–6(4)	(Russia) Daria Salnikova	(Germany) Syna Kayser (Italy) Nicole Clerico	(Switzerland) Clelia Melena (Poland) Justyna Jegiołka (Switzerland) Samira Giger (Poland) Olga Brózda
June 14	Lenzerheide, Switzerland; Clay $10,000; Singles draw – Doubles draw	(Poland) Olga Brózda (Poland) Sylwia Zagórska; 4–6, 6–1, [10–5]	(Italy) Martina Caciotti (Italy) Nicole Clerico	(Germany) Syna Kayser (Italy) Nicole Clerico	(Switzerland) Clelia Melena (Poland) Justyna Jegiołka (Switzerland) Samira Giger (Poland) Olga Brózda
June 14	Montemor-o-Novo, Portugal; Hard $10,000; Singles draw – Doubles draw	(Portugal) Magali de Lattre; 3–6, 6–4, 6–4	(Spain) Arabela Fernández Rabener	(Greece) Despina Papamichail (Russia) Julia Parasyuk	(France) Alice Tisset (Russia) Diana Arutyunova (Bulgaria) Julia Stamatova (Australia) Shayna McDowell
June 14	Montemor-o-Novo, Portugal; Hard $10,000; Singles draw – Doubles draw	(Canada) Mélanie Gloria (Mexico) Daniela Múñoz Gallegos; 7–6(3), 6–1	(Germany) Kim Grajdek (Bulgaria) Julia Stamatova	(Greece) Despina Papamichail (Russia) Julia Parasyuk	(France) Alice Tisset (Russia) Diana Arutyunova (Bulgaria) Julia Stamatova (Australia) Shayna McDowell
June 14	Alkmaar, Netherlands; Clay $10,000; Singles draw – Doubles draw	(Netherlands) Marcella Koek; 6–3, 6–3	(Netherlands) Angelique van der Meet	(Belgium) Anouk Delefortrie (Netherlands) Kiki Bertens	(Australia) Monika Wejnert (Netherlands) Cindy Burger (Belarus) Sviatlana Pirazhenka (Belgium) Sofie Oyen
June 14	Alkmaar, Netherlands; Clay $10,000; Singles draw – Doubles draw	(Russia) Anna Arina Marenko (Belarus) Sviatlana Pirazhenka; 6–3, 6–1	(Belgium) Elyne Boeykens (Australia) Monika Wejnert	(Belgium) Anouk Delefortrie (Netherlands) Kiki Bertens	(Australia) Monika Wejnert (Netherlands) Cindy Burger (Belarus) Sviatlana Pirazhenka (Belgium) Sofie Oyen
June 14	Mount Pleasant, United States; Clay $10,000; Singles draw – Doubles draw	(Slovenia) Petra Rampre; 6–3, 6–2	(United States) Lauren Davis	(United States) Nicole Gibbs (United States) Megan Falcon	(United States) Caitlin Whoriskey (United States) Alexis King (Ukraine) Anastasia Kharchenko (Finland) Piia Suomalainen
June 14	Mount Pleasant, United States; Clay $10,000; Singles draw – Doubles draw	(United States) Kaitlyn Christian (United States) Caitlin Whoriskey; 6–4, 6–2	(Slovenia) Petra Rampre (United States) Shelby Rogers	(United States) Nicole Gibbs (United States) Megan Falcon	(United States) Caitlin Whoriskey (United States) Alexis King (Ukraine) Anastasia Kharchenko (Finland) Piia Suomalainen
June 14	Bratislava, Slovakia; Clay $25,000; Singles draw – Doubles draw	(Slovakia) Lenka Juríková; 6–2, 6–1	(Italy) Camila Giorgi	(France) Laura Thorpe (Ukraine) Oksana Lyubtsova	(Argentina) Florencia Molinero (Poland) Barbara Sobaszkiewics (Poland) Karolina Kosińska (Czech Republic) Tereza Hladíková
June 14	Bratislava, Slovakia; Clay $25,000; Singles draw – Doubles draw	(Slovakia) Katarina Kachlíková (Slovakia) Lenka Tvarošková; 6–4, 7–6(2)	(Canada) Gabriela Dabrowski (Slovakia) Chantal Škamlová	(France) Laura Thorpe (Ukraine) Oksana Lyubtsova	(Argentina) Florencia Molinero (Poland) Barbara Sobaszkiewics (Poland) Karolina Kosińska (Czech Republic) Tereza Hladíková
June 21	2010 Empire Loans Women's Pro Circuit 50K Challenger; Boston, United States; Hard $50,000; Singles draw – Doubles draw	(United States) Jamie Hampton; 6–2, 6–1	(United States) Madison Brengle	(United States) Alexandra Mueller (United States) Jennifer Elie	(United States) Lindsay Lee-Waters (Japan) Remi Tezuka (United States) Julia Boserup (United States) Julia Cohen
June 21	2010 Empire Loans Women's Pro Circuit 50K Challenger; Boston, United States; Hard $50,000; Singles draw – Doubles draw	(United States) Kimberly Couts (Ukraine) Tetiana Luzhanska; 6–4, 3–6, [10–8]	(United States) Lindsay Lee-Waters (United States) Megan Moulton-Levy	(United States) Alexandra Mueller (United States) Jennifer Elie	(United States) Lindsay Lee-Waters (Japan) Remi Tezuka (United States) Julia Boserup (United States) Julia Cohen
June 21	2010 Open GDF Suez du Périgord; Périgueux, France; Clay $25,000; Singles draw – Doubles draw	(Czech Republic) Petra Cetkovská; 2–6, 6–1, 6–1	(Georgia (country)) Margalita Chakhnashvili	(France) Claire Feuerstein (France) Stéphanie Foretz	(France) Nathalie Piquion (Germany) Scarlett Werner (Brazil) Maria Fernanda Alves (France) Stéphanie Vongsouthi
June 21	2010 Open GDF Suez du Périgord; Périgueux, France; Clay $25,000; Singles draw – Doubles draw	(Netherlands) Elise Tamaëla (Germany) Scarlett Werner; 6–2, 6–1	(Ukraine) Lyudmyla Kichenok (Ukraine) Nadiia Kichenok	(France) Claire Feuerstein (France) Stéphanie Foretz	(France) Nathalie Piquion (Germany) Scarlett Werner (Brazil) Maria Fernanda Alves (France) Stéphanie Vongsouthi
June 21	Getxo, Spain; Clay $25,000; Singles draw – Doubles draw	(Spain) Sílvia Soler Espinosa; 6–2, 6–1	(Germany) Sarah Gronert	(Turkey) Çağla Büyükakçay (France) Laura Thorpe	(Germany) Laura Siegemund (Spain) Leticia Costas (China) Lu Jingjing (Peru) Bianca Botto
June 21	Getxo, Spain; Clay $25,000; Singles draw – Doubles draw	(Austria) Sandra Klemenschits (Slovenia) Andreja Klepač; 6–0, 6–0	(China) Lu Jingjing (Germany) Laura Siegemund	(Turkey) Çağla Büyükakçay (France) Laura Thorpe	(Germany) Laura Siegemund (Spain) Leticia Costas (China) Lu Jingjing (Peru) Bianca Botto
June 21	Rome, Italy; Clay $25,000; Singles draw – Doubles draw	(Austria) Patricia Mayr; 7–6^{(7–2)}, 6–4	(Kazakhstan) Zarina Diyas	(Bulgaria) Dia Evtimova (Ukraine) Yuliana Fedak	(Romania) Diana Enache (Italy) Karin Knapp (Germany) Sina Haas (Australia) Sophie Ferguson
June 21	Rome, Italy; Clay $25,000; Singles draw – Doubles draw	(Australia) Sophie Ferguson (Australia) Trudi Musgrave; 6–0, 6–3	(Italy) Claudia Giovine (Italy) Valentina Sulpizio	(Bulgaria) Dia Evtimova (Ukraine) Yuliana Fedak	(Romania) Diana Enache (Italy) Karin Knapp (Germany) Sina Haas (Australia) Sophie Ferguson
June 21	Kristinehamn, Sweden; Clay $25,000; Singles draw – Doubles draw	(Slovakia) Lenka Wienerová; 6–2, 3–6, 7–6^{(7–2)}	(United States) Jacqueline Cako	(Germany) Anne Schäfer (Germany) Carmen Klaschka	(Ukraine) Tetyana Arefyeva (Finland) Emma Laine (Russia) Valeria Savinykh (Germany) Mona Barthel
June 21	Kristinehamn, Sweden; Clay $25,000; Singles draw – Doubles draw	(Bosnia and Herzegovina) Mervana Jugić-Salkić (Finland) Emma Laine; 6–2, 6–3	(Israel) Julia Glushko (Turkey) Pemra Özgen	(Germany) Anne Schäfer (Germany) Carmen Klaschka	(Ukraine) Tetyana Arefyeva (Finland) Emma Laine (Russia) Valeria Savinykh (Germany) Mona Barthel
June 21	Gausdal, Norway; Hard $10,000; Singles draw – Doubles draw	(France) Victoria Larrière; 6–1, 6–2	(Denmark) Karen Barbat	(Romania) Patricia Chirea (Norway) Emma Flood	(United States) Danielle Mills (Russia) Anastasia Mukhametova (United Kingdom) Samantha Vickers (Czech Republic) Zuzana Linhová
June 21	Gausdal, Norway; Hard $10,000; Singles draw – Doubles draw	(Denmark) Malou Ejdesgaard (Czech Republic) Zuzana Linhová; 6–2, 6–3	(Russia) Karina Isayan (Russia) Anastasia Mukhametova	(Romania) Patricia Chirea (Norway) Emma Flood	(United States) Danielle Mills (Russia) Anastasia Mukhametova (United Kingdom) Samantha Vickers (Czech Republic) Zuzana Linhová
June 21	Alcobaça, Portugal; Hard $10,000; Singles draw – Doubles draw	(Portugal) Magali de Lattre; 2–6, 6–3, 6–3	(Australia) Shayna McDowell	(Mexico) Alejandra Granillo (Canada) Mélanie Gloria	(Greece) Despina Papamichail (United Kingdom) Anna Fitzpatrick (Italy) Alice Balducci (Georgia (country)) Sofia Kvatsabaia
June 21	Alcobaça, Portugal; Hard $10,000; Singles draw – Doubles draw	(United Kingdom) Anna Fitzpatrick (United Kingdom) Jade Windley; 6–2, 6–1	(Canada) Mélanie Gloria (Mexico) Daniela Múñoz Gallegos	(Mexico) Alejandra Granillo (Canada) Mélanie Gloria	(Greece) Despina Papamichail (United Kingdom) Anna Fitzpatrick (Italy) Alice Balducci (Georgia (country)) Sofia Kvatsabaia
June 21	Davos, Switzerland; Clay $10,000; Singles draw – Doubles draw	(Switzerland) Myriam Casanova; 6–3, 4–6, 6–4	(Russia) Viktoria Kamenskaya	(Chile) Camila Silva (Italy) Annalisa Bona	(Italy) Stefania Fadabini (Switzerland) Lara Michel (Germany) Syna Kayser (Russia) Daria Salnikova
June 21	Davos, Switzerland; Clay $10,000; Singles draw – Doubles draw	(United Kingdom) Amanda Elliott (Australia) Emelyn Starr; 6–1, 6–2	(Switzerland) Sarah Moundir (Switzerland) Amra Sadiković	(Chile) Camila Silva (Italy) Annalisa Bona	(Italy) Stefania Fadabini (Switzerland) Lara Michel (Germany) Syna Kayser (Russia) Daria Salnikova
June 21	Rotterdam, Netherlands; Clay $10,000; Singles draw – Doubles draw	(Netherlands) Kiki Bertens; 6–4, 6–2	(Netherlands) Daniëlle Harmsen	(Russia) Marina Melnikova (Netherlands) Quirine Lemoine	(Netherlands) Marcella Koek (Czech Republic) Iveta Gerlová (Belgium) Elyne Boeykens (Netherlands) Bibiane Schoofs
June 21	Rotterdam, Netherlands; Clay $10,000; Singles draw – Doubles draw	(Czech Republic) Iveta Gerlová (Czech Republic) Jana Jandová; 6–4, 4–6, [10–5]	(Russia) Anna Arina Marenko (Russia) Ekaterina Yakovleva	(Russia) Marina Melnikova (Netherlands) Quirine Lemoine	(Netherlands) Marcella Koek (Czech Republic) Iveta Gerlová (Belgium) Elyne Boeykens (Netherlands) Bibiane Schoofs
June 21	Cleveland, United States; Clay $10,000; Singles draw – Doubles draw	(United States) Madison Keys; 6–2, 6–4	(Finland) Piia Suomalainen	(Colombia) Yuliana Lizarazo (Venezuela) Gabriela Paz	(United Kingdom) Nicola Slater (United States) Caitlin Whoriskey (Ukraine) Anastasia Kharchenko (United States) Sabrina Santamaria
June 21	Cleveland, United States; Clay $10,000; Singles draw – Doubles draw	(United States) Sanaz Marand (United States) Caitlin Whoriskey; 6–4, 6–0	(United States) Emily J. Harman (United States) Eleanor Peters	(Colombia) Yuliana Lizarazo (Venezuela) Gabriela Paz	(United Kingdom) Nicola Slater (United States) Caitlin Whoriskey (Ukraine) Anastasia Kharchenko (United States) Sabrina Santamaria
June 21	Buenos Aires, Argentina; Clay $10,000; Singles draw – Doubles draw	(Argentina) Paula Ormaechea; 6–2, 6–2	(Argentina) Lucía Jara Lozano	(Argentina) Tatiana Búa (Argentina) Luciana Sarmenti	(Bolivia) María Fernanda Álvarez Terán (Brazil) Nathalia Rossi (Argentina) Aranza Salut (Argentina) Mailen Auroux
June 21	Buenos Aires, Argentina; Clay $10,000; Singles draw – Doubles draw	(Argentina) Luciana Sarmenti (Argentina) Emilia Yorio; 6–3, 6–7(2), [10–8]	(Argentina) Tatiana Búa (Colombia) Karen Castiblanco	(Argentina) Tatiana Búa (Argentina) Luciana Sarmenti	(Bolivia) María Fernanda Álvarez Terán (Brazil) Nathalia Rossi (Argentina) Aranza Salut (Argentina) Mailen Auroux
June 28	Cuneo, Italy; Clay $100,000; Singles draw – Doubles draw	(Italy) Romina Oprandi; 6–0 6–2	(France) Pauline Parmentier	(Spain) Lourdes Domínguez Lino (France) Laura Thorpe	(Australia) Sophie Ferguson (Russia) Evgeniya Rodina (Italy) Claudia Giovine (Argentina) María Irigoyen
June 28	Cuneo, Italy; Clay $100,000; Singles draw – Doubles draw	(Czech Republic) Eva Birnerová (Czech Republic) Lucie Hradecká; 3–6 6–4 [10–8]	(Romania) Sorana Cîrstea (Slovenia) Andreja Klepač	(Spain) Lourdes Domínguez Lino (France) Laura Thorpe	(Australia) Sophie Ferguson (Russia) Evgeniya Rodina (Italy) Claudia Giovine (Argentina) María Irigoyen
June 28	Pozoblanco, Spain; Hard $50,000; Singles draw – Doubles draw	(France) Olivia Sanchez; 6–3 6–4	(Spain) Beatriz García Vidagany	(Belarus) Anastasiya Yakimova (Russia) Alexandra Panova	(Japan) Tomoko Yonemura (Austria) Melanie Klaffner (Spain) Sílvia Soler Espinosa (Turkey) Çağla Büyükakçay
June 28	Pozoblanco, Spain; Hard $50,000; Singles draw – Doubles draw	(Japan) Akiko Yonemura (Japan) Tomoko Yonemura; 6–4 3–6 [10–4]	(Ukraine) Valentyna Ivakhnenko (Ukraine) Kateryna Kozlova	(Belarus) Anastasiya Yakimova (Russia) Alexandra Panova	(Japan) Tomoko Yonemura (Austria) Melanie Klaffner (Spain) Sílvia Soler Espinosa (Turkey) Çağla Büyükakçay
June 28	Stuttgart-Vaihingen, Germany; Clay $25,000; Singles draw – Doubles draw	(Luxembourg) Mandy Minella; 6–4 6–2	(Netherlands) Elise Tamaëla	(Slovakia) Zuzana Luknárová (Germany) Sarah Gronert	(Romania) Elena Bogdan (Kazakhstan) Zarina Diyas (Romania) Irina-Camelia Begu (Russia) Elena Chalova
June 28	Stuttgart-Vaihingen, Germany; Clay $25,000; Singles draw – Doubles draw	(Luxembourg) Mandy Minella (France) Irena Pavlovic; 6–3 6–4	(Poland) Magdalena Kiszczyńska (Japan) Erika Sema	(Slovakia) Zuzana Luknárová (Germany) Sarah Gronert	(Romania) Elena Bogdan (Kazakhstan) Zarina Diyas (Romania) Irina-Camelia Begu (Russia) Elena Chalova
June 28	Mont-de-Marsan, France; Clay $25,000; Singles draw – Doubles draw	(Czech Republic) Petra Cetkovská; 6–2 6–2	(Bulgaria) Elitsa Kostova	(France) Anaïs Laurendon (France) Nathalie Piquion	(Belarus) Iryna Kuryanovich (Australia) Olivia Rogowska (Spain) Eloisa Compostizo de Andrés (Spain) Lara Arruabarrena Vecino
June 28	Mont-de-Marsan, France; Clay $25,000; Singles draw – Doubles draw	(Spain) Lara Arruabarrena Vecino (Spain) Inés Ferrer Suárez; 6–3 6–1	(Ukraine) Nadiia Kichenok (France) Constance Sibille	(France) Anaïs Laurendon (France) Nathalie Piquion	(Belarus) Iryna Kuryanovich (Australia) Olivia Rogowska (Spain) Eloisa Compostizo de Andrés (Spain) Lara Arruabarrena Vecino
June 28	Toruń, Poland; Clay $25,000; Singles draw – Doubles draw	(Russia) Ksenia Pervak; 6–4 6–1	(Poland) Magda Linette	(Poland) Katarzyna Piter (Ukraine) Yuliya Beygelzimer	(Australia) Karolina Wlodarczak (Ukraine) Veronika Kapshay (Italy) Camila Giorgi (Poland) Justyna Jegiołka
June 28	Toruń, Poland; Clay $25,000; Singles draw – Doubles draw	(Serbia) Teodora Mirčić (Australia) Marija Mirkovic; 4–6 6–2 [10–5]	(Poland) Katarzyna Piter (Poland) Barbara Sobaszkiewicz	(Poland) Katarzyna Piter (Ukraine) Yuliya Beygelzimer	(Australia) Karolina Wlodarczak (Ukraine) Veronika Kapshay (Italy) Camila Giorgi (Poland) Justyna Jegiołka
June 28	Ystad, Sweden; Clay $25,000; Singles draw – Doubles draw	(Sweden) Sofia Arvidsson; 6–3 6–1	(Russia) Valeria Savinykh	(Israel) Julia Glushko (France) Claire de Gubernatis	(Finland) Emma Laine (Slovakia) Lenka Wienerová (Ukraine) Tetyana Arefyeva (Canada) Heidi El Tabakh
June 28	Ystad, Sweden; Clay $25,000; Singles draw – Doubles draw	(Bosnia and Herzegovina) Mervana Jugić-Salkić (Finland) Emma Laine; 6–1 6–1	(Ukraine) Tetyana Arefyeva (Ukraine) Anastasiya Lytovchenko	(Israel) Julia Glushko (France) Claire de Gubernatis	(Finland) Emma Laine (Slovakia) Lenka Wienerová (Ukraine) Tetyana Arefyeva (Canada) Heidi El Tabakh
June 28	Melilla, Spain; Hard $10,000; Singles draw – Doubles draw	(Romania) Diana Stomlega; 5–7 6–4 7–5	(United States) Danielle Mills	(Spain) Carmen López Rueda (Russia) Elina Gasanova	(Mexico) Alejandra Granillo (Belgium) Gally De Wael (Spain) Carolina Prats Millán (Morocco) Fatima El Allami
June 28	Melilla, Spain; Hard $10,000; Singles draw – Doubles draw	(Belgium) Gally De Wael (Russia) Elina Gasanova; 6–0 6–0	(Spain) Yvonne Cavallé Reimers (Russia) Margarita Lazareva	(Spain) Carmen López Rueda (Russia) Elina Gasanova	(Mexico) Alejandra Granillo (Belgium) Gally De Wael (Spain) Carolina Prats Millán (Morocco) Fatima El Allami
June 28	Cremona, Italy; Clay $10,000; Singles draw – Doubles draw	(Italy) Raffaella Bindi; 6–4 6–1	(Spain) Sandra Soler Sola	(Italy) Paola Cigui (Italy) Annalisa Bona	(Romania) Diana Enache (Italy) Alice Savoretti (Germany) Sabrina Baumgarten (Italy) Francesca Palmigiano
June 28	Cremona, Italy; Clay $10,000; Singles draw – Doubles draw	(Switzerland) Lisa Sabino (Italy) Andreea Văideanu; 6–4 7–5	(Italy) Stefania Fadabini (Italy) Alice Moroni	(Italy) Paola Cigui (Italy) Annalisa Bona	(Romania) Diana Enache (Italy) Alice Savoretti (Germany) Sabrina Baumgarten (Italy) Francesca Palmigiano
June 28	Gausdal, Norway; Hard $10,000; Singles draw – Doubles draw	(France) Victoria Larrière; 6–3 6–4	(United States) Gail Brodsky	(Germany) Jasmin Steinherr (Denmark) Karen Barbat	(United Kingdom) Lisa Whybourn (Russia) Karina Isayan (Latvia) Diāna Marcinkēviča (Ukraine) Khristina Kazimova
June 28	Gausdal, Norway; Hard $10,000; Singles draw – Doubles draw	(Denmark) Karen Barbat (United Kingdom) Mhairi Brown; 6–2 6–2	(United Kingdom) Nicola George (United Kingdom) Lisa Whybourn	(Germany) Jasmin Steinherr (Denmark) Karen Barbat	(United Kingdom) Lisa Whybourn (Russia) Karina Isayan (Latvia) Diāna Marcinkēviča (Ukraine) Khristina Kazimova
June 28	Nonthaburi, Thailand; Hard $10,000; Singles draw – Doubles draw	(Indonesia) Jessy Rompies; 6–2 7–5	(Thailand) Nicha Lertpitaksinchai	(Thailand) Varatchaya Wongteanchai (Thailand) Nudnida Luangnam	(South Korea) Kim Kun-Hee (South Korea) Kang Seo-kyung (South Korea) Yu Min-hwa (Japan) Ai Yamamoto
June 28	Nonthaburi, Thailand; Hard $10,000; Singles draw – Doubles draw	(Chinese Taipei) Chen Yi (Thailand) Varatchaya Wongteanchai; 6–2 6–2	(South Korea) Kim Kun-Hee (South Korea) Yu Min-Hwa	(Thailand) Varatchaya Wongteanchai (Thailand) Nudnida Luangnam	(South Korea) Kim Kun-Hee (South Korea) Kang Seo-kyung (South Korea) Yu Min-hwa (Japan) Ai Yamamoto
June 28	Hefei, China; Hard $10,000; Singles draw – Doubles draw	(China) Duan Yingying; 6–3 6–4	(China) Zheng Saisai	(China) Liang Chen (Georgia (country)) Tatia Mikadze	(China) Zhou Xiao (China) Zhao Yijing (China) Liu Shaozhuo (China) Zhu Lin
June 28	Hefei, China; Hard $10,000; Singles draw – Doubles draw	(China) Tian Ran (China) Zheng Saisai; 6–0 6–4	(China) Bai Xi (China) Zhang Kailin	(China) Liang Chen (Georgia (country)) Tatia Mikadze	(China) Zhou Xiao (China) Zhao Yijing (China) Liu Shaozhuo (China) Zhu Lin

== See also ==
- 2010 ITF Women's Circuit
- 2010 ITF Women's Circuit (January–March)
- 2010 ITF Women's Circuit (July–September)
- 2010 ITF Women's Circuit (October–December)
- 2010 WTA Tour
