= 2011 ITK Open =

- Date: 22–28 August
- Edition: 1st
- Location: Istanbul, Turkey

Champions

Singles
- (France) Victoria Larrière

Doubles
- (France) Julie Coin / (Czech Republic) Eva Hrdinová
- ITK Open

The 2011 ITK Open was a professional tennis tournament played on hard courts. It was the first edition of the tournament which was part of the 2011 ITF Women's Circuit. It took place in Istanbul, Turkey between 22 and 28 August 2011.

== WTA entrants ==
=== Seeds ===
Country	Player	Rank^{1}	Seed
GER	Sarah Gronert	230	1
FRA	Irena Pavlovic	235	2
GBR	Melanie South	246	3
RSA	Chanel Simmonds	258	4
RUS	Valeria Solovieva	263	5
UKR	Veronika Kapshay	269	6
LTU	Lina Stančiūtė	272	7
UKR	Tetyana Arefyeva	274	8

- ^{1} Rankings are as of August 15, 2011.

=== Other entrants ===
The following players received wildcards into the singles main draw:

- (Turkey) Hülya Esen
- (Turkey) Sultan Gönen
- (Tunisia) Ons Jabeur
- (Turkey) Melis Sezer

The following players received entry from the qualifying draw:

- (Italy) Gioia Barbieri
- (Greece) Despina Papamichail
- (Austria) Nicole Rottmann
- (Ukraine) Elina Svitolina

== Champions ==
=== Singles ===
(France) Victoria Larrière def. (Germany) Sarah Gronert, 6–3, 1–6, 7–5

=== Doubles ===
(France) Julie Coin / (Czech Republic) Eva Hrdinová def. (Austria) Sandra Klemenschits / (France) Irena Pavlovic, 6–4, 7–5
