= 2011 ITK Open – Singles =

Singles
- 2011 ITK Open

Final
- Champions: (France) Victoria Larrière
- Runners-up: (Germany) Sarah Gronert
- Score: 6–3, 1–6, 7–5

Events
Singles	Doubles
← 2010 ·	ITK Open	· 2012 →

This is a new event to the 2011 ITF Women's Circuit.
Victoria Larrière won the title by defeating Sarah Gronert in the final 6–3, 1–6, 7–5.

== Seeds ==
1. (Germany) Sarah Gronert (final)
2. (France) Irena Pavlovic (second round)
3. (United Kingdom) Melanie South (first round)
4. (South Africa) Chanel Simmonds (second round)
5. (Russia) Valeria Solovieva (second round)
6. (Ukraine) Veronika Kapshay (first round)
7. (Lithuania) Lina Stančiūtė (first round)
8. (Ukraine) Tetyana Arefyeva (second round)

== Main draw ==
=== Key ===
- Q = Qualifier
- WC = Wild card
- LL = Lucky loser
- Alt = Alternate
- SE = Special exempt
- PR = Protected ranking
- ITF = ITF entry
- JE = Junior exempt
- w/o = Walkover
- r = Retired
- d = Defaulted
- SR = Special ranking

=== Finals ===
Semifinals
1	(Germany) Sarah Gronert	6	7
(Germany) Annika Beck	2	5
(Bosnia and Herzegovina) Jasmina Tinjić	2	2
(France) Victoria Larrière	6	6

Final
1	(Germany) Sarah Gronert	3	6	5
(France) Victoria Larrière	6	1	7

=== Top half ===
First round
1	(Germany) S Gronert	6	6
(Serbia) T Mirčić	3	4
(France) J Coin	5	6	3
(Netherlands) R Hogenkamp	7	3	6
(Morocco) N Lalami	6^{5}	6	6
(Italy) A Grymalska	7^{7}	1	4
(Georgia (country)) S Shapatava	4	7^{7}	6
7	(Lithuania) L Stančiūtė	6	6^{3}	2
4	(South Africa) C Simmonds	6	7^{7}
(United Kingdom) T Moore	2	6^{3}
(Germany) A Beck	6	6
WC	(Turkey) M Sezer	4	4
(Germany) N Geuer	3	0
Q	(Italy) G Barbieri	6	6
WC	(Tunisia) O Jabeur	3	7^{7}	3
5	(Russia) V Solovieva	6	6^{5}	6

Second round
1	(Germany) S Gronert	7^{10}	6
(Netherlands) R Hogenkamp	6^{8}	4
(Morocco) N Lalami	1	0
(Georgia (country)) S Shapatava	6	6
4	(South Africa) C Simmonds	4	3
(Germany) A Beck	6	6
Q	(Italy) G Barbieri	7^{7}	6
5	(Russia) V Solovieva	6^{3}	3

Quarterfinals
1	(Germany) S Gronert	6	7^{7}
(Georgia (country)) S Shapatava	0	6^{2}
(Germany) A Beck	6	6
Q	(Italy) G Barbieri	4	1

Semifinals
1	(Germany) S Gronert	6	7
(Germany) A Beck	2	5

=== Bottom half ===
First round
6	(Ukraine) V Kapshay	4	4
(Bosnia and Herzegovina) J Tinjić	6	6
(Croatia) A Vrljić	3	2
(Turkey) P Özgen	6	6
(Italy) N Burnett	6	6
JE	(Russia) I Khromacheva	3	3
(Japan) R Fuda	4	6	6
3	(United Kingdom) M South	6	2	4
8	(Ukraine) T Arefyeva	7	6
WC	(Turkey) S Gönen	5	3
Q	(Ukraine) E Svitolina	6	6
Q	(Greece) D Papamichail	2	3
Q	(Austria) N Rottmann	6	4	4
(France) V Larrière	4	6	6
WC	(Turkey) H Esen	2	1
2	(France) I Pavlovic	6	6

Second round
(Bosnia and Herzegovina) J Tinjić	6	6
(Turkey) P Özgen	4	2
(Italy) N Burnett	1	4
(Japan) R Fuda	6	6
8	(Ukraine) T Arefyeva	2	3
Q	(Ukraine) E Svitolina	6	6
(France) V Larrière	4	6	6
2	(France) I Pavlovic	6	4	4

Quarterfinals
(Bosnia and Herzegovina) J Tinjić	6	6
(Japan) R Fuda	0	4
Q	(Ukraine) E Svitolina	1	4
(France) V Larrière	6	6

Semifinals
(Bosnia and Herzegovina) J Tinjić	2	2
(France) V Larrière	6	6
