= ITK Open =

ITF Women's Tour
- Event name: ITK Open
- Location: Istanbul, Turkey
- Venue: İstanbul Tenis Kulübü
- Category: ITF Women's Circuit
- Surface: Hard
- Draw: 32S/32Q/16D
- Prize money: $50,000
- Website: istanbulteniskulubu.org.tr

The ITK Open was a tournament for professional female tennis players played on outdoor hard courts. The event was classified as a $50,000 ITF Women's Circuit tournament. It was held in Istanbul, Turkey, in 2011.

== Past finals ==
=== Women's singles ===
Year	Champion	Runner-up	Score
2011	(France) Victoria Larrière	(Germany) Sarah Gronert	6–3, 1–6, 7–5

=== Women's doubles ===
Year	Champions	Runners-up	Score
2011	(France) Julie Coin (Czech Republic) Eva Hrdinová	(Austria) Sandra Klemenschits (France) Irena Pavlovic	6–4, 7–5
