= 2011 ITK Open – Doubles =

Doubles
- 2011 ITK Open

Final
- Champion: (France) Julie Coin (Czech Republic) Eva Hrdinová
- Runner-up: (Austria) Sandra Klemenschits (France) Irena Pavlovic
- Score: 6–4, 7–5

Events
Singles	Doubles
← 2010 ·	ITK Open	· 2012 →

This was a new event to the 2011 ITF Women's Circuit.
Julie Coin and Eva Hrdinová won the title by defeating Sandra Klemenschits and Irena Pavlovic in the final 6–4, 7–5.

== Seeds ==
1. (Austria) Sandra Klemenschits / (France) Irena Pavlovic (final)
2. (France) Julie Coin / (Czech Republic) Eva Hrdinová (champions)
3. (France) Victoria Larrière / (United Kingdom) Melanie South (first round)
4. (Russia) Valeria Solovieva / (Ukraine) Maryna Zanevska (quarterfinals)

== Draw ==
=== Key ===
- Q = Qualifier
- WC = Wild card
- LL = Lucky loser
- Alt = Alternate
- SE = Special exempt
- PR = Protected ranking
- ITF = ITF entry
- JE = Junior exempt
- w/o = Walkover
- r = Retired
- d = Defaulted
- SR = Special ranking

=== Draw ===
First round
1	(Austria) S Klemenschits (France) I Pavlovic	7	5	[10]
(Turkey) M Sezer (Russia) M Shamayko	5	7	[3]
(Morocco) N Lalami (South Africa) C Simmonds	4	7	[10]
WC	(Turkey) H Esen (Turkey) L Esen	6	5	[7]
4	(Russia) V Solovieva (Ukraine) M Zanevska	6	6
(Ukraine) T Arefyeva (Russia) E Pashkova	3	2
WC	(Turkey) P Özgen (Lithuania) L Stančiūtė	1	6	[8]
(Ukraine) V Kapshay (Russia) E Yashina	6	4	[10]
(Serbia) T Mirčić (Croatia) A Vrljić	6	6
WC	(Turkey) S Gönen (Slovenia) A Prislan	4	2
(Georgia (country)) T Mikadze (Georgia (country)) S Shapatava	6	1	[10]
3	(France) V Larrière (United Kingdom) M South	3	6	[7]
(Uzbekistan) N Abduraimova (Uzbekistan) V Ekshibarova	0	4
(Italy) G Barbieri (Italy) A Grymalska	6	6
(Netherlands) R Hogenkamp (Austria) N Rottmann	3	1
2	(France) J Coin (Czech Republic) E Hrdinová	6	6

Quarterfinals
1	(Austria) S Klemenschits (France) I Pavlovic	6	7
(Morocco) N Lalami (South Africa) C Simmonds	4	5
4	(Russia) V Solovieva (Ukraine) M Zanevska	3	6	[4]
(Ukraine) V Kapshay (Russia) E Yashina	6	2	[10]
(Serbia) T Mirčić (Croatia) A Vrljić	0	6	[10]
(Georgia (country)) T Mikadze (Georgia (country)) S Shapatava	6	3	[6]
(Italy) G Barbieri (Italy) A Grymalska	3	1
2	(France) J Coin (Czech Republic) E Hrdinová	6	6

Semifinals
1	(Austria) S Klemenschits (France) I Pavlovic	7^{10}	6
(Ukraine) V Kapshay (Russia) E Yashina	6^{8}	4
(Serbia) T Mirčić (Croatia) A Vrljić	0	2
2	(France) J Coin (Czech Republic) E Hrdinová	6	6

Finals
1	(Austria) S Klemenschits (France) I Pavlovic	4	5
2	(France) J Coin (Czech Republic) E Hrdinová	6	7
