= Victoria Larrière =

French tennis player

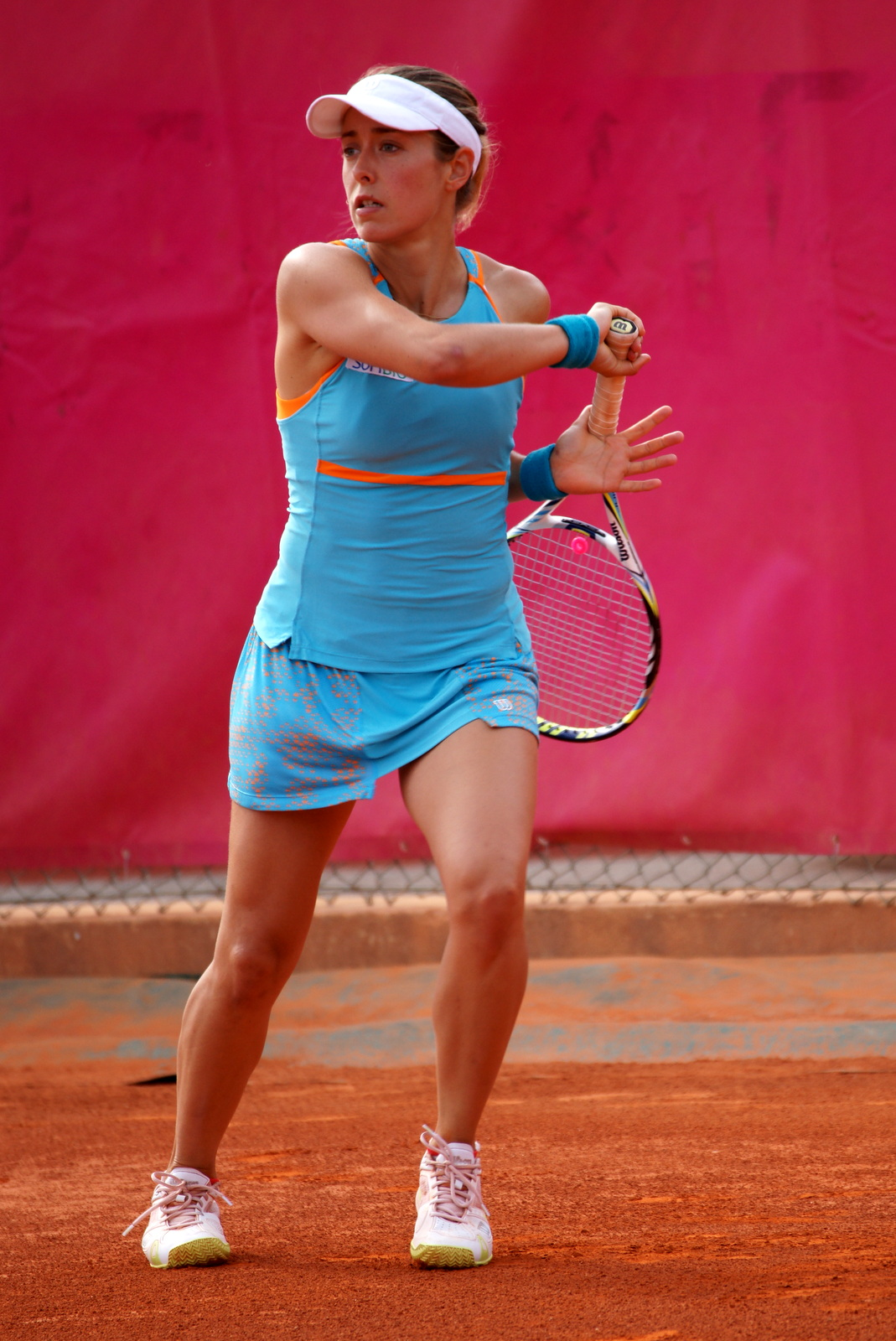
- Larrière at the 2013 Open GdF Suez
- Country (sports): France
- Residence: Cabriès, France
- Born: 2 May 1991 (age 33); Martigues, France
- Height: 1.68 m (5 ft 6 in)
- Plays: Right (two-handed backhand)
- Prize money: $144,513

Singles
- Career record: 168–117
- Career titles: 10 ITF
- Highest ranking: No. 172 (14 May 2012)

Grand Slam singles results
- Australian Open: Q3 (2012)
- French Open: 1R (2012)
- Wimbledon: Q1 (2012)
- US Open: Q2 (2012)

Doubles
- Career record: 71–57
- Career titles: 10 ITF
- Highest ranking: No. 233 (21 May 2012)

Grand Slam doubles results
- French Open: 1R (2011, 2012)

Victoria Larrière (born 2 May 1991) is a French former professional tennis player. She reached her highest singles ranking of world No. 172 on 14 May 2012.

== Career ==
Larrière won her first $50k level tournament at the 2011 ITK Open in Istanbul, defeating Sarah Gronert in the final. The following week, she qualified into the main draw of the WTA Tour's Tashkent Open, where she defeated Zuzana Kučová in the first round. She beat her first top 10 in the second round, the No. 5 seed Magdaléna Rybáriková, before bowing out to eventual tournament winner, Ksenia Pervak, in round three.

Larrière lost in the first round of the doubles main draw at the 2011 French Open. She nearly qualified for the 2012 Australian Open, leading by a set and a break in the last qualification round but she lost in three sets to Chang Kai-chen. She was awarded a wildcard for the main draw of the 2012 French Open but lost in the first round to the 16th seed Maria Kirilenko, in two sets.

== ITF Circuit finals ==
$50,000 tournaments
$25,000 tournaments
$10,000 tournaments

=== Singles: 15 (10 titles, 5 runner-ups) ===
Result	No.	Date	Location	Surface	Opponent	Score
Loss	1.	15 June 2009	Gausdal, Norway	Hard	(Russia) Maria Mokh	7–5, 3–6, 6–7^{(5)}
Loss	2.	26 January 2010	Grenoble, France	Hard	(France) Anaïs Laurendon	3–6, 2–6
Win	1.	11 May 2010	Tortosa, Spain	Clay	(Belgium) An-Sophie Mestach	7–5, 4–6, 6–4
Win	2.	21 June 2010	Gausdal, Norway	Hard	(Denmark) Karen Barbat	6–1, 6–2
Win	3.	28 June 2010	Gausdal, Norway	Hard	(United States) Gail Brodsky	6–3, 6–4
Loss	3.	5 October 2010	Port Pirie, Australia	Hard	(Japan) Erika Sema	1–6, 6–4, 3–6
Loss	4.	25 April 2011	Vic, Spain	Hard	(Greece) Despina Papamichail	6–7^{(8)}, 1–6
Win	4.	10 May 2011	Tenerife, Spain	Hard	(Mexico) Ximena Hermoso	6–1, 6–1
Win	5.	20 June 2011	Alcobaça, Portugal	Hard	(Spain) Garbiñe Muguruza	6–3, 3–6, 6–3
Win	6.	5 July 2011	Valladolid, Spain	Hard	(Argentina) Aranza Salut	6–2, 7–6^{(6)}
Win	7.	23 August 2011	Istanbul, Turkey	Hard	(Germany) Sarah Gronert	6–3, 1–6, 7–5
Win	8.	9 October 2012	Margaret River, Australia	Hard	(Australia) Olivia Rogowska	6–3, 6–3
Loss	5.	23 January 2016	Hammamet, Tunisia	Clay	(Italy) Anastasia Grymalska	6–3, 2–6, 3–6
Win	9.	21 February 2016	Hammamet, Tunisia	Clay	(Egypt) Sandra Samir	6–1, 6–4
Win	10.	1 October 2016	Roehampton, Great Britain	Hard	(United States) Dasha Ivanova	6–2, 6–3

=== Doubles: 12 (10 titles, 2 runner-ups) ===
Result	No.	Date	Location	Surface	Partner	Opponents	Score
Win	1.	16 Jun 2009	Gausdal, Norway	Hard	(Czech Republic) Zuzana Linhová	(Norway) Helene Auensen (Denmark) Malou Ejdesgaard	3–6, 6–4, [10–0]
Win	2.	23 Jun 2009	Gausdal, Norway	Hard	(Czech Republic) Zuzana Linhová	(Russia) Elizaveta Kuzmina (Israel) Margarita-Greta Skripnik	6–0, 6–2
Win	3.	13 Jan 2010	Glasgow, Great Britain	Hard (i)	(United Kingdom) Anna Smith	(Italy) Nicole Clerico (Romania) Liana Ungur	6–4, 6–4
Win	4.	26 Jan 2010	Grenoble, France	Hard (i)	(France) Irina Ramialison	(United States) Mallory Cecil (United States) Megan Moulton-Levy	6–3, 6–4
Win	5.	13 Jul 2010	Cáceres, Spain	Hard	(Australia) Jade Hopper	(Spain) Georgina García-Pérez (Germany) Kim-Alice Grajdek	7–5, 6–4
Win	6.	19 Jul 2010	A Coruña, Spain	Hard	(Australia) Jade Hopper	(Spain) Leticia Costas (Spain) Inés Ferrer Suárez	7–6^{(6)}, 6–1
Win	7.	16 Aug 2010	Innsbruck, Austria	Clay	(France) Elixane Lechemia	(Switzerland) Xenia Knoll (Switzerland) Amra Sadiković	w/o
Win	8.	5 Jul 2011	Valladolid, Spain	Hard	(Denmark) Malou Ejdesgaard	(Argentina) Vanesa Furlanetto (Argentina) Aranza Salut	6–0, 6–3
Loss	1.	12 Jul 2011	Cáceres, Spain	Hard	(France) Irena Pavlovic	(Netherlands) Richèl Hogenkamp (Portugal) Maria João Koehler	4–6, 4–6
Win	9.	19 Jul 2011	ITF La Coruña, Spain	Hard	(Hungary) Tímea Babos	(Spain) Leticia Costas (Spain) Inés Ferrer Suárez	7–5, 6–3
Win	10.	28 Aug 2012	ITF Cairns, Australia	Hard	(Australia) Monique Adamczak	(Australia) Tyra Calderwood (Australia) Tammi Patterson	6–2, 1–6, [10–5]
Loss	2.	1 Oct 2012	ITF Esperance, Australia	Hard	(Australia) Olivia Rogowska	(Australia) Ashleigh Barty (Australia) Sally Peers	6–4, 6–7^{(5)}, [4–10]
