= Sarah Gronert =

German tennis player

- Country (sports): Germany
- Born: 6 July 1986 (age 38); Linnich, West Germany
- Prize money: $96,009

Singles
- Career record: 164–108
- Career titles: 9 ITF
- Highest ranking: No. 164 (14 May 2012)

Grand Slam singles results
- Australian Open: Q2 (2012)
- French Open: Q1 (2012)
- Wimbledon: Q1 (2012)
- US Open: Q1 (2010, 2012)

Doubles
- Career record: 4–1
- Career titles: 1 ITF

Sarah Gronert (born 6 July 1986) is a German former professional tennis player. She won a total of ten titles on the ITF Women's Circuit in her career and her best WTA ranking of 164 came on 14 May 2012.

== Intersex condition ==
Gronert was born intersex, with both male and female genitalia. She had surgery at the age of 19 and is legally and competitively considered to be a woman.

== ITF finals ==
=== Singles (9–5) ===
Legend $100,000 tournaments $75,000 tournaments $50,000 tournaments $25,000 tournaments $10,000 tournaments	Finals by surface Hard (4–1) Clay (3–4) Grass (0–0) Carpet (2–0)

Result	No.	Date	Tournament	Surface	Opponent	Score
Loss	1.	23 March 2008	ITF Amiens, France	Clay (i)	(France) Karla Mraz	4–6, 7–5, 1–6
Win	1.	25 January 2009	ITF Kaarst, Germany	Carpet (i)	(Latvia) Irina Kuzmina	2–6, 6–4, 7–5
Win	2.	7 March 2009	ITF Ra'anana, Israel	Clay	(Belgium) Lavinia Lobbinger	6–0, 6–1
Win	3.	19 July 2009	ITF Darmstadt, Germany	Clay	(Slovakia) Zuzana Kučová	6–1, 6–1
Win	4.	16 August 2009	Reinert Open, Germany	Clay	(Croatia) Darija Jurak	6–3, 3–6, 7–6^{(5)}
Loss	2.	23 August 2009	ITF Wahlstedt, Germany	Clay	(Bosnia and Herzegovina) Sandra Martinović	6–2, 1–6, 4–6
Win	5.	17 January 2010	GB Pro-Series Glasgow, UK	Hard (i)	(Germany) Julia Babilon	2–6, 6–2, 6–1
Loss	3.	26 June 2010	ITF Getxo, Spain	Clay	(Spain) Sílvia Soler Espinosa	2–6, 1–6
Win	6.	30 January 2011	ITF Kaarst, Germany	Carpet (i)	(Germany) Anna Zaja	6–7^{(4)}, 7–6^{(5)}, 6–3
Win	7.	24 July 2011	ITF Wrexham, UK	Hard	(Slovakia) Lenka Wienerová	6–4, 6–4
Loss	4.	7 August 2011	Ladies Open Hechingen, Germany	Clay	(Germany) Tatjana Malek	3–6, 4–6
Loss	5.	28 August 2011	ITF Istanbul, Turkey	Hard	(France) Victoria Larrière	3–6, 6–1, 5–7
Win	8.	5 February 2012	GB Pro-Series Sunderland, UK	Hard (i)	(Germany) Annika Beck	3–6, 6–2, 6–3
Win	9.	21 July 2012	GB Pro-Series Foxhills, UK	Hard	(Latvia) Diāna Marcinkēviča	6–2, 6–3

=== Doubles (1–0) ===
Legend $50,000 tournaments $25,000 tournaments $10,000 tournaments	Finals by surface Hard (0–0) Clay (1–0) Carpet (0–0)

Result	Date	Tournament	Surface	Partner	Opponents	Score
Win	6 March 2009	ITF Ra'anana, Israel	Clay	(Israel) Keren Shlomo	(Switzerland) Lucia Kovarčíková (Czech Republic) Zuzana Linhová	7–5, 7–5
