= Irena Pavlovic =

French tennis player (born 1988)

Irena Pavlović
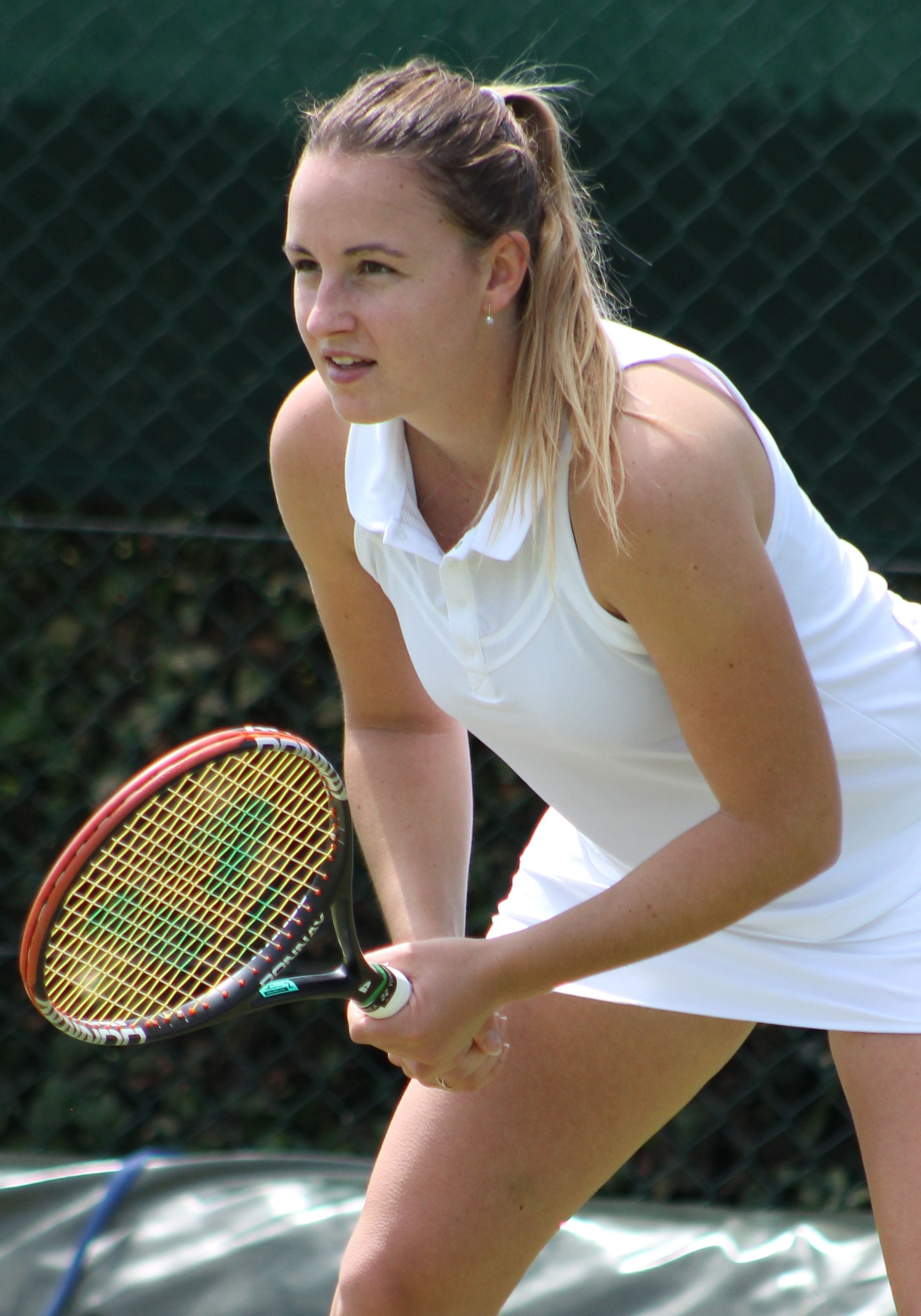
- Irena Pavlovic in 2014
- Country (sports): France
- Residence: Paris
- Born: 28 September 1988 (age 36); Belgrade, Serbia
- Height: 1.78 m (5 ft 10 in)
- Turned pro: 2004
- Plays: Right (two-handed both sides)
- Prize money: $418,053

Singles
- Career record: 260–234
- Career titles: 4 ITF
- Highest ranking: No. 138 (8 October 2012)

Grand Slam singles results
- Australian Open: 1R (2012)
- French Open: 2R (2012)
- Wimbledon: Q3 (2012, 2014)
- US Open: Q3 (2012, 2014)

Doubles
- Career record: 124–75
- Career titles: 14 ITF
- Highest ranking: No. 107 (21 February 2011)

Irena Pavlovic (Serbian: Irena Pavlović, Ирена Павловић, pronounced [irěːna pǎːʋloʋitɕ]; born 28 September 1988) is a French former tennis player of Serbian descent. Born in Serbian capital Belgrade, she moved to Paris when she was three.

Pavlovic won four singles and 14 doubles events organized by the International Tennis Federation. Her highest WTA rankings were No. 138 in singles and 107 in doubles.

She was awarded with wildcards for two WTA Tour tournaments in 2009, the Internationaux de Strasbourg and French Open, which was her first Grand Slam appearance. Pavlovic lost in the first round both times to Kristina Barrois and Akgul Amanmuradova, respectively. In her career, she defeated players such as Monica Niculescu, Anne Keothavong and Marina Erakovic.

== Early and personal life ==
Pavlovic, born in Belgrade (SFR Yugoslavia then) to Dragan and Mirjana, has a brother, Filip, who was a basketball player. Russian tennis player Arina Rodionova is a good friend of Pavlovic, who began playing tennis aged four, with Monica Seles as her idol. Upon being coached by Christophe Serriere and Danyel Ristic, she was coached at the Mouratoglou Tennis Academy.

== Grand Slam performance timeline ==
Key
W	F	SF	QF	#R	RR	Q#	P#	DNQ	A	Z#	PO	G	S	B	NMS	NTI	P	NH

(W) winner; (F) finalist; (SF) semifinalist; (QF) quarterfinalist; (#R) rounds 4, 3, 2, 1; (RR) round-robin stage; (Q#) qualification round; (P#) preliminary round; (DNQ) did not qualify; (A) absent; (Z#) Davis/Fed Cup Zonal Group (with number indication) or (PO) play-off; (G) gold, (S) silver or (B) bronze Olympic/Paralympic medal; (NMS) not a Masters tournament; (NTI) not a Tier I tournament; (P) postponed; (NH) not held; (SR) strike rate (events won / competed); (W–L) win–loss record.
To avoid confusion and double counting, these charts are updated at the conclusion of a tournament or when the player's participation has ended.

=== Singles ===
Tournament	2005	2006	2007	2008	2009	2010	2011	2012	2013	W–L
Australian Open	A	A	A	A	A	A	Q1	1R	Q1	0–1
French Open	Q2	Q1	Q1	Q1	1R	Q1	Q1	2R	1R	1–3
Wimbledon	A	A	A	A	A	A	A	Q3	Q1	0–0
US Open	A	A	A	Q2	A	Q1	A	Q3	Q1	0–0
Win–loss	0–0	0–0	0–0	0–0	0–1	0–0	0–0	1–2	0–1	1–4

== ITF Circuit finals ==
Legend
$75,000 tournaments
$50,000 tournaments
$25,000 tournaments
$10,000 tournaments

=== Singles: 14 (4 titles, 10 runner-ups) ===
Result	W–L	Date	Tournament	Tier	Surface	Opponent	Score
Loss	1.	22 January 2006	ITF Tipton, United Kingdom	10,000	Hard (i)	(France) Virginie Pichet	4–6, 1–6
Loss	2.	January 2006	ITF Hull, United Kingdom	10,000	Hard (i)	(United Kingdom) Melanie South	4–6, 1–6
Win	3.	Jul 2006	ITF Frinton, United Kingdom	10,000	Grass	(United Kingdom) Georgie Gent	6–2, 6–4
Win	4.	Aug 2006	ITF Wrexham, United Kingdom	10,000	Hard	(United Kingdom) Jane O'Donoghue	6–3, 6–7, 7–6
Loss	5.	Oct 2006	ITF Jersey, United Kingdom	25,000	Hard (i)	(Germany) Angelique Kerber	0–6, 4–6
Loss	6.	Feb 2007	ITF Portimão, Portugal	10,000	Hard	(Portugal) Neuza Silva	6–7^{(2–7)}, 4–6
Win	7.	Nov 2007	ITF Nuriootpa, Australia	25,000	Hard	(Australia) Monique Adamczak	6–2, 5–7, 6–4
Loss	8.	Dec 2009	Bendigo International, Australia	25,000	Hard	(Australia) Alicia Molik	3–6, 4–6
Loss	9.	Apr 2010	ITF Gimhae, South Korea	25,000	Hard	(Chinese Taipei) Chan Yung-jan	2–6, 1–6
Loss	10.	Jun 2010	ITF Sarajevo, BiH	25,000	Clay	(Romania) Liana Ungur	3–6, 0–6
Loss	11.	Sep 2010	ITF Alphen aan den Rijn, Netherlands	25,000	Clay	(Germany) Julia Schruff	0–6, 3–6
Win	12.	Jul 2013	ITF Middelburg, Netherlands	25,000	Clay	(Netherlands) Angelique van der Meet	6–3, 6–4
Loss	13.	Aug 2013	ITF Koksijde, Belgium	25,000	Clay	(Netherlands) Richèl Hogenkamp	4–6, 1–6
Loss	14.	Feb 2014	Launceston International, Australia	50,000	Hard	(Australia) Olivia Rogowska	7–5, 4–6, 0–6

=== Doubles: 23 (14 titles, 9 runner-ups) ===
Result	No.	Date	Tournament	Tier	Surface	Partner	Opponents	Score
Loss	1.	Oct 2006	Open Nantes Atlantique, France	25,000	Hard (i)	(Germany) Sabine Lisicki	(United Kingdom) Rebecca Llewellyn (United Kingdom) Melanie South	2–6, 0–6
Win	2.	Sep 2008	ITF Madrid, Spain	25,000	Hard	(France) Julie Coin	(Ukraine) Yuliya Beygelzimer (Russia) Anastasia Poltoratskaya	6–3, 6–4
Loss	3.	Sep 2008	ITF Granada, Spain	25,000	Hard	(Russia) Regina Kulikova	(Spain) Leticia Costas (Spain) Maite Gabarrús-Alonso	w/o
Win	4.	Dec 2008	Dubai Tennis Challenge, UAE	75,000	Hard	(Slovenia) Maša Zec Peškirič	(Russia) Elena Chalova (Russia) Valeria Savinykh	7–6^{(6)}, 3–6, [10–3]
Win	5.	Sep 2009	ITF Madrid, Spain	25,000	Hard	(Russia) Nina Bratchikova	(France) Claire Feuerstein (France) Constance Sibille	6–2, 6–4
Win	6.	Dec 2009	Bendigo International, Australia	25,000	Hard	(Russia) Arina Rodionova	(United Kingdom) Jocelyn Rae (Australia) Emelyn Starr	6–3, 7–6^{(3)}
Win	7.	Feb 2010	ITF Belfort, France	25,000	Carpet (i)	(Russia) Elena Bovina	(Austria) Nikola Hofmanova (Russia) Karina Pimkina	6–2, 2–6, [10–6]
Win	8.	Mar 2010	ITF Minsk, Belarus	25,000	Hard (i)	(Russia) Elena Bovina	(Estonia) Maret Ani (Russia) Vitalia Diatchenko	6–0, 6–1
Win	9.	Mar 2010	ITF Moscow, Russia	25,000	Hard (i)	(Russia) Nina Bratchikova	(Ukraine) Lyudmyla Kichenok (Ukraine) Nadiia Kichenok	6–7^{(4)}, 6–2, [10–3]
Win	10.	May 2010	ITF Caserta, Italy	25,000	Clay	(Belarus) Ekaterina Dzehalevich	(Italy) Nicole Clerico (Canada) Rebecca Marino	6–3, 6–3
Win	11.	Jun 2010	ITF Sarajevo, BiH	25,000	Clay	(Ukraine) Irina Buryachok	(Italy) Nicole Clerico (Poland) Karolina Kosińska	6–1, 6–1
Win	12.	Jul 2010	ITF Stuttgart, Germany	25,000	Clay	(Luxembourg) Mandy Minella	(Poland) Magdalena Kiszczyńska (Japan) Erika Sema	6–3, 6–4
Loss	13.	Sep 2010	ITF Alphen aan den Rijn, Netherlands	25,000	Clay	(Russia) Ksenia Lykina	(Netherlands) Daniëlle Harmsen (Netherlands) Bibiane Schoofs	3–6, 2–6
Win	14.	Sep 2010	GB Pro-Series Shrewsbury, United Kingdom	75,000	Hard (i)	(Russia) Vitalia Diatchenko	(France) Claire Feuerstein (Russia) Vesna Manasieva	4–6, 6–4, [10–6]
Win	15.	Oct 2010	Open de Touraine, France	50,000	Hard (i)	(Germany) Tatjana Malek	(France) Stéphanie Cohen-Aloro (Tunisia) Selima Sfar	6–4, 5–7, [10–8]
Win	16.	Nov 2010	ITF Bratislava, Slovakia	25,000	Hard (i)	(Finland) Emma Laine	(France) Claire Feuerstein (Russia) Valeria Savinykh	6–4, 6–4
Loss	17.	Jun 2011	ITF Campobasso, Italy	25,000	Clay	(Croatia) Ani Mijačika	(Argentina) Mailen Auroux (Argentina) María Irigoyen	2–6, 6–3, 4–6
Win	18.	Jul 2011	ITF Pozoblanco, Spain	50,000	Hard	(Russia) Nina Bratchikova	(Russia) Marina Melnikova (Georgia (country)) Sofia Shapatava	6–2, 6–4
Loss	19.	Jul 2011	ITF Cáceres, Spain	25,000	Hard	(France) Victoria Larrière	(Netherlands) Richèl Hogenkamp (Portugal) Maria João Koehler	4–6, 4–6
Loss	20.	Aug 2011	ITF Istanbul, Turkey	50,000	Hard	(Austria) Sandra Klemenschits	(France) Julie Coin (Czech Republic) Eva Hrdinová	4–6, 5–7
Loss	21.	Oct 2011	Open de Touraine, France	50,000	Hard (i)	(Greece) Eirini Georgatou	(Ukraine) Lyudmyla Kichenok (Ukraine) Nadiia Kichenok	2–6, 0–6
Loss	22.	Oct 2012	Open de Limoges, France	50,000	Hard (i)	(Switzerland) Stefanie Vögele	(Poland) Magda Linette (Poland) Sandra Zaniewska	1–6, 7–5, [5–10]
Loss	23.	Apr 2014	Seoul Open Challenger, South Korea	50,000	Hard	(Czech Republic) Kristýna Plíšková	(Chinese Taipei) Chan Chin-wei (Chinese Taipei) Chuang Chia-jung	4–6, 3–6
