= 2011 ITF Women's Circuit (July–September) =

The 2011 ITF Women's Circuit is the 2011 edition of the second-tier tour for women's professional tennis. It is organised by the International Tennis Federation and is a tier below the WTA Tour. During the months of July 2011 and September 2011 over 150 tournaments were played with the majority being played in the month of August.

== Key ==
$100,000 tournaments
$75,000 tournaments
$50,000 tournaments
$25,000 tournaments
$10,000 tournaments

== July ==
Week of	Tournament	Winner	Runners-up	Semifinalists	Quarterfinalists
July 4	2011 Open GDF Suez de Biarritz; Biarritz, France; Clay $100,000; Singles – Doubles	(France) Pauline Parmentier; 1–6, 6–4, 6–4	(Austria) Patricia Mayr-Achleitner	(Spain) Carla Suárez Navarro (Luxembourg) Mandy Minella	(France) Iryna Brémond (France) Stéphanie Foretz Gacon (Romania) Edina Gallovits-Hall (Spain) Leticia Costas
July 4	2011 Open GDF Suez de Biarritz; Biarritz, France; Clay $100,000; Singles – Doubles	(Russia) Alexandra Panova (Poland) Urszula Radwańska; 6–2, 6–1	(Japan) Erika Sema (Brazil) Roxane Vaisemberg	(Spain) Carla Suárez Navarro (Luxembourg) Mandy Minella	(France) Iryna Brémond (France) Stéphanie Foretz Gacon (Romania) Edina Gallovits-Hall (Spain) Leticia Costas
July 4	2011 WOW Tennis Challenger; Waterloo, Canada; Clay $50,000; Singles – Doubles	(Canada) Sharon Fichman; 6–3, 4–6, 6–4	(United States) Julia Boserup	(Slovenia) Petra Rampre (United States) Chichi Scholl	(United States) Alison Riske (South Africa) Chanel Simmonds (Canada) Carol Zhao (Ukraine) Tetiana Luzhanska
July 4	2011 WOW Tennis Challenger; Waterloo, Canada; Clay $50,000; Singles – Doubles	(United States) Alexandra Mueller (United States) Asia Muhammad; 6–3, 3–6, [10–7]	(Canada) Eugenie Bouchard (United States) Megan Moulton-Levy	(Slovenia) Petra Rampre (United States) Chichi Scholl	(United States) Alison Riske (South Africa) Chanel Simmonds (Canada) Carol Zhao (Ukraine) Tetiana Luzhanska
July 4	2011 Chang ITF Thailand Pro-Circuit; Pattaya, Thailand; Hard $25,000; Singles – Doubles	(Japan) Akiko Omae; 7–5, 6–2	(Japan) Sachie Ishizu	(United States) Chieh-yu Hsu (China) Zhao Yijing	(Japan) Misa Eguchi (Thailand) Luksika Kumkhum (China) Wang Qiang (Thailand) Nicha Lertpitaksinchai
July 4	2011 Chang ITF Thailand Pro-Circuit; Pattaya, Thailand; Hard $25,000; Singles – Doubles	(China) Liang Chen (China) Zhao Yijing; 6–1, 6–4	(Japan) Yurina Koshino (Thailand) Varatchaya Wongteanchai	(United States) Chieh-yu Hsu (China) Zhao Yijing	(Japan) Misa Eguchi (Thailand) Luksika Kumkhum (China) Wang Qiang (Thailand) Nicha Lertpitaksinchai
July 4	2011 Trofeul Popeci; Craiova, Romania; Clay $25,000; Singles – Doubles	(Romania) Mihaela Buzărnescu; 6–2, 3–6, 6–4	(Italy) Annalisa Bona	(Romania) Elena Bogdan (Austria) Tina Schiechtl	(Serbia) Doroteja Erić (Romania) Elora Dabija (Russia) Marina Shamayko (China) Liu Min
July 4	2011 Trofeul Popeci; Craiova, Romania; Clay $25,000; Singles – Doubles	(Romania) Diana Enache (Netherlands) Daniëlle Harmsen; 4–6, 7–6^{(7–5)}, [10–6]	(Romania) Elena Bogdan (Romania) Mihaela Buzărnescu	(Romania) Elena Bogdan (Austria) Tina Schiechtl	(Serbia) Doroteja Erić (Romania) Elora Dabija (Russia) Marina Shamayko (China) Liu Min
July 4	Aschaffenburg, Germany; Clay $25,000; Singles draw – Doubles draw	(Argentina) Florencia Molinero; 7–6^{(8–6)}, 6–1	(Liechtenstein) Stephanie Vogt	(Ukraine) Sofiya Kovalets (Austria) Nikola Hofmanova	(Germany) Anne Schäfer (Netherlands) Bibiane Schoofs (Poland) Sandra Zaniewska (Ukraine) Veronika Kapshay
July 4	Aschaffenburg, Germany; Clay $25,000; Singles draw – Doubles draw	(Turkey) Pemra Özgen (Japan) Yurika Sema; 6–4, 7–6^{(7–5)}	(Czech Republic) Hana Birnerová (Liechtenstein) Stephanie Vogt	(Ukraine) Sofiya Kovalets (Austria) Nikola Hofmanova	(Germany) Anne Schäfer (Netherlands) Bibiane Schoofs (Poland) Sandra Zaniewska (Ukraine) Veronika Kapshay
July 4	Valladolid, Spain; Hard $10,000; Singles draw – Doubles draw	(France) Victoria Larrière; 6–2, 7–6^{(8–6)}	(Argentina) Aranza Salut	(Spain) Arabela Fernández Rabener (Argentina) Vanesa Furlanetto	(Spain) Rocío de la Torre-Sánchez (Spain) Paula Rincón Otero (Spain) Carolina Prats Millán (Russia) Natalia Orlova
July 4	Valladolid, Spain; Hard $10,000; Singles draw – Doubles draw	(Denmark) Malou Ejdesgaard (France) Victoria Larrière; 6–0, 6–3	(Argentina) Vanesa Furlanetto (Argentina) Aranza Salut	(Spain) Arabela Fernández Rabener (Argentina) Vanesa Furlanetto	(Spain) Rocío de la Torre-Sánchez (Spain) Paula Rincón Otero (Spain) Carolina Prats Millán (Russia) Natalia Orlova
July 4	Brussels, Belgium; Clay $10,000; Singles draw – Doubles draw	(Slovakia) Zuzana Zlochová; 6–4, 6–2	(France) Marion Gaud	(France) Chloé Paquet (Russia) Marina Melnikova	(Czech Republic) Martina Borecká (Netherlands) Nicolette van Uitert (Poland) Veronika Domagała (Belgium) Nicky Van Dyck
July 4	Brussels, Belgium; Clay $10,000; Singles draw – Doubles draw	(Netherlands) Marcella Koek (Netherlands) Eva Wacanno; 7–5, 3–6, [10–5]	(Belgium) Els Callens (Belgium) Nancy Feber	(France) Chloé Paquet (Russia) Marina Melnikova	(Czech Republic) Martina Borecká (Netherlands) Nicolette van Uitert (Poland) Veronika Domagała (Belgium) Nicky Van Dyck
July 4	Prokuplje, Serbia; Clay $10,000; Singles draw – Doubles draw	(Serbia) Jovana Jakšić; 6–2, 6–3	(Hungary) Zsófia Susányi	(Bulgaria) Julia Stamatova (Serbia) Saška Gavrilovska	(Czech Republic) Zuzana Linhová (Slovenia) Polona Reberšak (Bulgaria) Dalia Zafirova (Bulgaria) Isabella Shinikova
July 4	Prokuplje, Serbia; Clay $10,000; Singles draw – Doubles draw	(Slovenia) Polona Reberšak (Hungary) Zsófia Susányi; 6–2, 4–6, [10–5]	(Romania) Claudia Enache (Austria) Katharina Negrin	(Bulgaria) Julia Stamatova (Serbia) Saška Gavrilovska	(Czech Republic) Zuzana Linhová (Slovenia) Polona Reberšak (Bulgaria) Dalia Zafirova (Bulgaria) Isabella Shinikova
July 4	Turin, Italy; Clay $10,000; Singles draw – Doubles draw	(Austria) Iris Khanna; 7–6^{(7–4)}, 5–7, 7–5	(Italy) Alice Moroni	(Italy) Federica Quercia (Italy) Benedetta Davato	(Italy) Stefania Chieppa (Italy) Paola Cigui (Italy) Federica Di Sarra (Italy) Martina Caregaro
July 4	Turin, Italy; Clay $10,000; Singles draw – Doubles draw	(Italy) Benedetta Davato (Italy) Valentina Sulpizio; 6–4, 6–3	(Japan) Yuka Higuchi (Japan) Kaori Onishi	(Italy) Federica Quercia (Italy) Benedetta Davato	(Italy) Stefania Chieppa (Italy) Paola Cigui (Italy) Federica Di Sarra (Italy) Martina Caregaro
July 4	İzmir, Turkey; Clay $10,000; Singles draw – Doubles draw	(Bulgaria) Aleksandrina Naydenova; 6–4, 6–3	(Russia) Daria Mironova	(Turkey) Hülya Esen (France) Manon Arcangioli	(Greece) Agni Stefanou (Russia) Eugeniya Pashkova (Norway) Emma Flood (Slovakia) Monika Širilová
July 4	İzmir, Turkey; Clay $10,000; Singles draw – Doubles draw	(Russia) Maria Mokh (Russia) Anastasia Mukhametova; 6–1, 6–3	(Russia) Alexandra Romanova (Czech Republic) Monika Tůmová	(Turkey) Hülya Esen (France) Manon Arcangioli	(Greece) Agni Stefanou (Russia) Eugeniya Pashkova (Norway) Emma Flood (Slovakia) Monika Širilová
July 4	Havana, Cuba; Hard $10,000; Singles draw – Doubles draw	(Japan) Makiho Kozawa; 6–1, 6–1	(Cuba) Misleydis Díaz González	(Italy) Jasmin Ladurner (Austria) Jeannine Prentner	(Mexico) Beatriz Flores (Mexico) Nazari Urbina (Belarus) Sasha Khabibulina (United Kingdom) Nicola George
July 4	Havana, Cuba; Hard $10,000; Singles draw – Doubles draw	(Cuba) Misleydis Díaz González (Cuba) Yamile Fors Guerra; 6–4, 6–1	(United Kingdom) Nicola George (Austria) Jeannine Prentner	(Italy) Jasmin Ladurner (Austria) Jeannine Prentner	(Mexico) Beatriz Flores (Mexico) Nazari Urbina (Belarus) Sasha Khabibulina (United Kingdom) Nicola George
July 4	Sarajevo, Bosnia and Herzegovina; Clay $10,000; Singles draw – Doubles draw	(Czech Republic) Martina Kubičíková; 3–6, 7–5, 6–0	(Czech Republic) Simona Dobrá	(Bosnia and Herzegovina) Jasmina Kajtazovič (Croatia) Bernarda Pera	(Serbia) Ema Polić (Australia) Azra Hadzic (Croatia) Ema Mikulčić (Norway) Ulrikke Eikeri
July 4	Sarajevo, Bosnia and Herzegovina; Clay $10,000; Singles draw – Doubles draw	(Czech Republic) Simona Dobrá (Czech Republic) Martina Kubičíková; 6–2, 6–1	(Hungary) Csilla Argyelán (Norway) Ulrikke Eikeri	(Bosnia and Herzegovina) Jasmina Kajtazovič (Croatia) Bernarda Pera	(Serbia) Ema Polić (Australia) Azra Hadzic (Croatia) Ema Mikulčić (Norway) Ulrikke Eikeri
July 11	2011 Open 88 Contrexéville; Contrexéville, France; Clay $50,000; Singles – Doubles	(France) Iryna Brémond; 6–4, 6–7^{(1–7)}, 6–2	(France) Stéphanie Foretz Gacon	(Czech Republic) Renata Voráčová (Romania) Edina Gallovits-Hall	(Netherlands) Arantxa Rus (Japan) Erika Sema (Germany) Nina Zander (Poland) Urszula Radwańska
July 11	2011 Open 88 Contrexéville; Contrexéville, France; Clay $50,000; Singles – Doubles	(Ukraine) Valentyna Ivakhnenko (Ukraine) Kateryna Kozlova; 2–6, 7–5, [12–10]	(Japan) Erika Sema (Brazil) Roxane Vaisemberg	(Czech Republic) Renata Voráčová (Romania) Edina Gallovits-Hall	(Netherlands) Arantxa Rus (Japan) Erika Sema (Germany) Nina Zander (Poland) Urszula Radwańska
July 11	2011 Internazionali di Imola; Imola, Italy; Carpet $25,000; Singles – Doubles	(Italy) Giulia Gatto-Monticone; 6–1, 6–3	(Italy) Federica Quercia	(Portugal) Magali de Lattre (Serbia) Milana Špremo	(Croatia) Maria Abramović (Germany) Scarlett Werner (Italy) Francesca Palmigiano (Poland) Justyna Jegiołka
July 11	2011 Internazionali di Imola; Imola, Italy; Carpet $25,000; Singles – Doubles	(Italy) Giulia Gatto-Monticone (Italy) Federica Quercia w/o	(Colombia) Yuliana Lizarazo (Germany) Scarlett Werner	(Portugal) Magali de Lattre (Serbia) Milana Špremo	(Croatia) Maria Abramović (Germany) Scarlett Werner (Italy) Francesca Palmigiano (Poland) Justyna Jegiołka
July 11	Darmstadt, Germany; Clay $25,000; Singles draw – Doubles draw	(Luxembourg) Mandy Minella; 7–6^{(7–5)}, 6–2	(Czech Republic) Karolína Plíšková	(Ukraine) Yuliya Lysa (Germany) Annika Beck	(Switzerland) Xenia Knoll (Ukraine) Veronika Kapshay (Slovakia) Zuzana Zlochová (Czech Republic) Zuzana Zálabská
July 11	Darmstadt, Germany; Clay $25,000; Singles draw – Doubles draw	(Russia) Natela Dzalamidze (Germany) Anna Zaja; 7–5, 2–6, [10–6]	(Czech Republic) Hana Birnerová (Czech Republic) Karolína Plíšková	(Ukraine) Yuliya Lysa (Germany) Annika Beck	(Switzerland) Xenia Knoll (Ukraine) Veronika Kapshay (Slovakia) Zuzana Zlochová (Czech Republic) Zuzana Zálabská
July 11	2011 Aegon GB Pro-Series Foxhills; Woking-Foxhills, United Kingdom; Hard $25,000; Singles – Doubles	(Australia) Johanna Konta; 6–4, 1–1, ret.	(United Kingdom) Laura Robson	(Russia) Vitalia Diatchenko (Lithuania) Lina Stančiūtė	(Russia) Marta Sirotkina (United Kingdom) Melanie South (Argentina) Catalina Pella (United Kingdom) Tara Moore
July 11	2011 Aegon GB Pro-Series Foxhills; Woking-Foxhills, United Kingdom; Hard $25,000; Singles – Doubles	(France) Julie Coin (Czech Republic) Eva Hrdinová; 6–1, 3–6, [10–8]	(Finland) Emma Laine (United Kingdom) Melanie South	(Russia) Vitalia Diatchenko (Lithuania) Lina Stančiūtė	(Russia) Marta Sirotkina (United Kingdom) Melanie South (Argentina) Catalina Pella (United Kingdom) Tara Moore
July 11	2011 Zwevegem Ladies Open; Zwevegem, Belgium; Clay $25,000; Singles – Doubles	(Romania) Mihaela Buzărnescu; 3–6, 6–2, 6–4	(Netherlands) Bibiane Schoofs	(Japan) Yurika Sema (Russia) Ekaterina Bychkova	(Germany) Mona Barthel (France) Myrtille Georges (Slovakia) Lenka Wienerová (Argentina) Florencia Molinero
July 11	2011 Zwevegem Ladies Open; Zwevegem, Belgium; Clay $25,000; Singles – Doubles	(Slovakia) Lenka Wienerová (Ukraine) Maryna Zanevska; 6–4, 3–6, [10–7]	(Netherlands) Kim Kilsdonk (Netherlands) Nicolette van Uitert	(Japan) Yurika Sema (Russia) Ekaterina Bychkova	(Germany) Mona Barthel (France) Myrtille Georges (Slovakia) Lenka Wienerová (Argentina) Florencia Molinero
July 11	Cáceres, Spain; Hard $25,000; Singles draw – Doubles draw	(Spain) Garbiñe Muguruza; 6–4, 6–3	(Turkey) Çağla Büyükakçay	(Netherlands) Richèl Hogenkamp (Portugal) Maria João Koehler	(Russia) Alexandra Panova (Venezuela) Marina Giral Lores (Spain) Sandra Soler-Sola (Greece) Despina Papamichail
July 11	Cáceres, Spain; Hard $25,000; Singles draw – Doubles draw	(Netherlands) Richèl Hogenkamp (Portugal) Maria João Koehler; 6–4, 6–4	(France) Victoria Larrière (France) Irena Pavlovic	(Netherlands) Richèl Hogenkamp (Portugal) Maria João Koehler	(Russia) Alexandra Panova (Venezuela) Marina Giral Lores (Spain) Sandra Soler-Sola (Greece) Despina Papamichail
July 11	2011 Challenger Banque Nationale de Granby; Granby, Canada; Hard $25,000; Singles – Doubles	(Canada) Stéphanie Dubois; 6–2, 2–6, 6–1	(Hong Kong) Zhang Ling	(Israel) Julia Glushko (Ukraine) Tetiana Luzhanska	(Chinese Taipei) Hsu Wen-hsin (Canada) Sharon Fichman (United States) Jennifer Elie (China) Sun Shengnan
July 11	2011 Challenger Banque Nationale de Granby; Granby, Canada; Hard $25,000; Singles – Doubles	(Canada) Sharon Fichman (China) Sun Shengnan; 6–4, 6–2	(Belarus) Viktoryia Kisialeva (Brazil) Nathalia Rossi	(Israel) Julia Glushko (Ukraine) Tetiana Luzhanska	(Chinese Taipei) Hsu Wen-hsin (Canada) Sharon Fichman (United States) Jennifer Elie (China) Sun Shengnan
July 11	İzmir, Turkey; Clay $10,000; Singles draw – Doubles draw	(Romania) Ana Bogdan; 6–1, 6–2	(Bulgaria) Aleksandrina Naydenova	(Russia) Maria Mokh (Russia) Ksenia Kirillova	(Italy) Sara Eccel (Turkey) Melis Sezer (Bulgaria) Julia Stamatova (France) Lou Brouleau
July 11	İzmir, Turkey; Clay $10,000; Singles draw – Doubles draw	(Russia) Elena Kulikova (Russia) Eugeniya Pashkova; 6–4, 6–3	(Russia) Ksenia Kirillova (Ukraine) Anna Piven	(Russia) Maria Mokh (Russia) Ksenia Kirillova	(Italy) Sara Eccel (Turkey) Melis Sezer (Bulgaria) Julia Stamatova (France) Lou Brouleau
July 11	Iași, Romania; Clay $10,000; Singles draw – Doubles draw	(Romania) Diana Enache; 7–6^{(11–9)}, 6–2	(Netherlands) Daniëlle Harmsen	(Italy) Andreea Văideanu (Romania) Camelia Hristea	(Romania) Cristina Adamescu (Romania) Elena-Theodora Cadar (China) Liu Min (Netherlands) Lisanne van Riet
July 11	Iași, Romania; Clay $10,000; Singles draw – Doubles draw	(Romania) Diana Enache (Netherlands) Daniëlle Harmsen; 6–4, 6–1	(Romania) Ionela-Andreea Iova (Italy) Andreea Văideanu	(Italy) Andreea Văideanu (Romania) Camelia Hristea	(Romania) Cristina Adamescu (Romania) Elena-Theodora Cadar (China) Liu Min (Netherlands) Lisanne van Riet
July 11	Tangier, Morocco; Clay $10,000; Singles draw – Doubles draw	(Mexico) Ximena Hermoso; 6–1, 7–6^{(7–5)}	(Morocco) Fatima El Allami	(Portugal) Bárbara Luz (France) Alice Tisset	(Spain) Sheila Solsona Carcasona (France) Alix Collombon (France) Amandine Cazeaux (Italy) Linda Mair
July 11	Tangier, Morocco; Clay $10,000; Singles draw – Doubles draw	(Morocco) Fatima El Allami (Russia) Anna Morgina; 3–6, 6–4, [10–6]	(Italy) Anna Agamennone (Italy) Linda Mair	(Portugal) Bárbara Luz (France) Alice Tisset	(Spain) Sheila Solsona Carcasona (France) Alix Collombon (France) Amandine Cazeaux (Italy) Linda Mair
July 11	Atlanta, United States; Hard $10,000; Singles draw – Doubles draw	(United States) Lauren Davis; 1–6, 6–2, 6–2	(United States) Alexis King	(United States) Lauren Embree (United States) Taylor Townsend	(China) Zhao Di (United States) Amanda McDowell (Russia) Angelina Gabueva (United States) Hayley Carter
July 11	Atlanta, United States; Hard $10,000; Singles draw – Doubles draw	(United States) Alexandra Cercone (United States) Natalie Pluskota; 7–5, 4–6, [10–8]	(United States) Alexandra Hirsch (United States) Amanda McDowell	(United States) Lauren Embree (United States) Taylor Townsend	(China) Zhao Di (United States) Amanda McDowell (Russia) Angelina Gabueva (United States) Hayley Carter
July 11	2011 Open Seguros Bolívar; Bogotá, Colombia; Clay $25,000; Singles – Doubles	(Colombia) Mariana Duque; 7–6^{(8–6)}, 4–6, 6–3	(Bolivia) María Fernanda Álvarez Terán	(Venezuela) Andrea Gámiz (United States) Sachia Vickery	(United States) Julia Cohen (Chile) Andrea Koch Benvenuto (Colombia) Karen Castiblanco (Venezuela) Adriana Pérez
July 11	2011 Open Seguros Bolívar; Bogotá, Colombia; Clay $25,000; Singles – Doubles	(Venezuela) Andrea Gámiz (Venezuela) Adriana Pérez; 6–3, 6–4	(United States) Julia Cohen (Chile) Andrea Koch Benvenuto	(Venezuela) Andrea Gámiz (United States) Sachia Vickery	(United States) Julia Cohen (Chile) Andrea Koch Benvenuto (Colombia) Karen Castiblanco (Venezuela) Adriana Pérez
July 18	2011 ITF Roller Open; Pétange, Luxembourg; Clay $100,000; Singles – Doubles	(France) Mathilde Johansson; 7–5, 6–3	(Czech Republic) Petra Cetkovská	(Czech Republic) Iveta Benešová (Sweden) Johanna Larsson	(Czech Republic) Eva Birnerová (Uzbekistan) Akgul Amanmuradova (Poland) Magda Linette (Germany) Kristina Barrois
July 18	2011 ITF Roller Open; Pétange, Luxembourg; Clay $100,000; Singles – Doubles	(Sweden) Johanna Larsson (Germany) Jasmin Wöhr; 7–6^{(7–2)}, 6–4	(Germany) Kristina Barrois (Germany) Anna-Lena Grönefeld	(Czech Republic) Iveta Benešová (Sweden) Johanna Larsson	(Czech Republic) Eva Birnerová (Uzbekistan) Akgul Amanmuradova (Poland) Magda Linette (Germany) Kristina Barrois
July 18	2011 Fifth Third Bank Tennis Championships; Lexington, United States; Hard $50,000; Singles – Doubles	(United States) Chichi Scholl; 6–1, 6–1	(United States) Amanda Fink	(Hong Kong) Zhang Ling (United States) Lauren Davis	(South Africa) Chanel Simmonds (Japan) Aiko Nakamura (Ukraine) Tetiana Luzhanska (United States) Alison Riske
July 18	2011 Fifth Third Bank Tennis Championships; Lexington, United States; Hard $50,000; Singles – Doubles	(Belgium) Tamaryn Hendler (United States) Chichi Scholl; 7–6^{(11–9)}, 3–6, [10–7]	(United States) Lindsay Lee-Waters (United States) Megan Moulton-Levy	(Hong Kong) Zhang Ling (United States) Lauren Davis	(South Africa) Chanel Simmonds (Japan) Aiko Nakamura (Ukraine) Tetiana Luzhanska (United States) Alison Riske
July 18	2011 Open GDF Suez des Contamines Montjoie; Les Contamines-Montjoie, France; Hard $25,000; Singles – Doubles	(France) Claire Feuerstein; 7–6^{(7–4)}, 2–6, 7–6^{(7–2)}	(France) Anaïs Laurendon	(Bulgaria) Isabella Shinikova (France) Julie Coin	(Croatia) Maria Abramović (Switzerland) Amra Sadiković (Croatia) Ana Vrljić (Poland) Patrycja Sanduska
July 18	2011 Open GDF Suez des Contamines Montjoie; Les Contamines-Montjoie, France; Hard $25,000; Singles – Doubles	(France) Julie Coin (Czech Republic) Eva Hrdinová; 6–3, 6–2	(Croatia) Maria Abramović (Italy) Nicole Clerico	(Bulgaria) Isabella Shinikova (France) Julie Coin	(Croatia) Maria Abramović (Switzerland) Amra Sadiković (Croatia) Ana Vrljić (Poland) Patrycja Sanduska
July 18	2011 Yesilyurt Tennis Cup; Samsun, Turkey; Hard $25,000; Singles – Doubles	(Russia) Yulia Putintseva; 7–6^{(8–6)}, 6–2	(Poland) Marta Domachowska	(Morocco) Nadia Lalami (Bulgaria) Dia Evtimova	(Croatia) Katja Milas (Slovenia) Tadeja Majerič (Bulgaria) Aleksandrina Naydenova (Turkey) Pemra Özgen
July 18	2011 Yesilyurt Tennis Cup; Samsun, Turkey; Hard $25,000; Singles – Doubles	(Romania) Mihaela Buzărnescu (Slovenia) Tadeja Majerič; 6–1, 6–4	(Turkey) Çağla Büyükakçay (Turkey) Pemra Özgen	(Morocco) Nadia Lalami (Bulgaria) Dia Evtimova	(Croatia) Katja Milas (Slovenia) Tadeja Majerič (Bulgaria) Aleksandrina Naydenova (Turkey) Pemra Özgen
July 18	2011 Aegon GB Pro-Series Wrexham; Wrexham, United Kingdom; Hard $25,000; Singles – Doubles	(Germany) Sarah Gronert; 6–4, 6–4	(Slovakia) Lenka Wienerová	(Lithuania) Lina Stančiūtė (Russia) Marta Sirotkina	(Spain) Garbiñe Muguruza (United Kingdom) Melanie South (United Kingdom) Lucy Brown (Japan) Shiho Akita
July 18	2011 Aegon GB Pro-Series Wrexham; Wrexham, United Kingdom; Hard $25,000; Singles – Doubles	(United Kingdom) Anna Fitzpatrick (United Kingdom) Jade Windley; 6–2, 4–6, [10–3]	(United Kingdom) Melanie South (Slovakia) Lenka Wienerová	(Lithuania) Lina Stančiūtė (Russia) Marta Sirotkina	(Spain) Garbiñe Muguruza (United Kingdom) Melanie South (United Kingdom) Lucy Brown (Japan) Shiho Akita
July 18	La Coruña, Spain; Hard $25,000; Singles draw – Doubles draw	(United States) Gail Brodsky; 6–3, 6–4	(Russia) Alexandra Panova	(Spain) Leticia Costas (Hungary) Tímea Babos	(Portugal) Maria João Koehler (France) Victoria Larrière (Greece) Despina Papamichail (France) Irena Pavlovic
July 18	La Coruña, Spain; Hard $25,000; Singles draw – Doubles draw	(Hungary) Tímea Babos (France) Victoria Larrière; 7–5, 6–3	(Spain) Leticia Costas (Spain) Inés Ferrer Suárez	(Spain) Leticia Costas (Hungary) Tímea Babos	(Portugal) Maria João Koehler (France) Victoria Larrière (Greece) Despina Papamichail (France) Irena Pavlovic
July 18	Viserba, Italy; Clay $10,000; Singles draw – Doubles draw	(Italy) Carolina Pillot; 6–4, 6–4	(Italy) Erika Zanchetta	(Italy) Silvia Albano (Italy) Agnese Zucchini	(Italy) Carolina Orsi (Slovakia) Nikola Vajdová (Switzerland) Clelia Melena (Switzerland) Lisa Sabino
July 18	Viserba, Italy; Clay $10,000; Singles draw – Doubles draw	(Japan) Yurina Koshino (Japan) Kaori Onishi; 6–2, 3–6, [10–6]	(Japan) Yuka Higuchi (Japan) Hirono Watanabe	(Italy) Silvia Albano (Italy) Agnese Zucchini	(Italy) Carolina Orsi (Slovakia) Nikola Vajdová (Switzerland) Clelia Melena (Switzerland) Lisa Sabino
July 18	Knokke, Belgium; Clay $10,000; Singles draw – Doubles draw	(Germany) Syna Kayser; 6–3, 6–0	(Netherlands) Eva Wacanno	(France) Amandine Hesse (Germany) Dinah Pfizenmaier	(Czech Republic) Monika Tůmová (Netherlands) Demi Schuurs (Kyrgyzstan) Bermet Duvanaeva (Belgium) Nicky Van Dyck
July 18	Knokke, Belgium; Clay $10,000; Singles draw – Doubles draw	(Belgium) Michaela Boev (Netherlands) Marcella Koek; 6–2, 7–6^{(7–3)}	(Germany) Katharina Holert (Czech Republic) Monika Tůmová	(France) Amandine Hesse (Germany) Dinah Pfizenmaier	(Czech Republic) Monika Tůmová (Netherlands) Demi Schuurs (Kyrgyzstan) Bermet Duvanaeva (Belgium) Nicky Van Dyck
July 18	Horb, Germany; Clay $10,000; Singles draw – Doubles draw	(Poland) Paula Kania; 4–6, 6–4, 7–5	(Germany) Carina Witthöft	(Czech Republic) Teresa Malíková (Czech Republic) Diana Šumová	(Poland) Katarzyna Kawa (Ukraine) Katerina Avdiyenko (Austria) Iris Khanna (France) Myrtille Georges
July 18	Horb, Germany; Clay $10,000; Singles draw – Doubles draw	(Poland) Paula Kania (Poland) Katarzyna Kawa; 1–6, 6–3, [10–2]	(Hungary) Vaszilisza Bulgakova (Germany) Christina Shakovets	(Czech Republic) Teresa Malíková (Czech Republic) Diana Šumová	(Poland) Katarzyna Kawa (Ukraine) Katerina Avdiyenko (Austria) Iris Khanna (France) Myrtille Georges
July 18	Casablanca, Morocco; Clay $10,000; Singles draw – Doubles draw	(Spain) Yvonne Cavallé Reimers; 7–5, 4–6, 6–3	(Mexico) Ximena Hermoso	(Japan) Kanami Tsuji (France) Alix Collombon	(Morocco) Fatima El Allami (Spain) Aida Martínez Sanjuán (Poland) Agata Barańska (Italy) Valentine Confalonierii
July 18	Casablanca, Morocco; Clay $10,000; Singles draw – Doubles draw	(Tunisia) Nour Abbès (Poland) Agata Barańska; 6–4, 6–2	(Mexico) Ximena Hermoso (Mexico) Ivette López	(Japan) Kanami Tsuji (France) Alix Collombon	(Morocco) Fatima El Allami (Spain) Aida Martínez Sanjuán (Poland) Agata Barańska (Italy) Valentine Confalonierii
July 18	Evansville, United States; Hard $10,000; Singles draw – Doubles draw	(United States) Elizabeth Ferris; 6–2, 6–1	(United States) Nicole Melichar	(Japan) Mai Minokoshi (Japan) Mayo Hibi	(United States) Jacqueline Wu (United States) Sabrina Santamaria (United States) Kyle McPhillips (Romania) Daiana Negreanu
July 18	Evansville, United States; Hard $10,000; Singles draw – Doubles draw	(United States) Brynn Boren (United States) Sabrina Santamaria; 6–4, 4–6, [11–9]	(United States) Nadia Echeverria Alam (United States) Elizabeth Ferris	(Japan) Mai Minokoshi (Japan) Mayo Hibi	(United States) Jacqueline Wu (United States) Sabrina Santamaria (United States) Kyle McPhillips (Romania) Daiana Negreanu
July 18	Ribeirão Preto, Brazil; Clay $10,000; Singles draw – Doubles draw	(Chile) Andrea Koch Benvenuto; 6–2, 6–2	(Brazil) Vivian Segnini	(Brazil) Paula Cristina Gonçalves (Brazil) Fernanda Faria	(Brazil) Nathaly Kurata (Argentina) Andrea Benítez (Brazil) Flávia Guimarães Bueno (Brazil) Gabriela Cé
July 18	Ribeirão Preto, Brazil; Clay $10,000; Singles draw – Doubles draw	(Brazil) Fernanda Faria (Brazil) Paula Cristina Gonçalves; 2–6, 6–2, [10–6]	(Argentina) Andrea Benítez (Brazil) Raquel Piltcher	(Brazil) Paula Cristina Gonçalves (Brazil) Fernanda Faria	(Brazil) Nathaly Kurata (Argentina) Andrea Benítez (Brazil) Flávia Guimarães Bueno (Brazil) Gabriela Cé
July 18	2011 BCR Open Romania Ladies; Bucharest, Romania; Clay $100,000+H; Singles – Doubles	(Romania) Irina-Camelia Begu; 6–3, 7–5	(Spain) Laura Pous Tió	(Romania) Simona Halep (Spain) Carla Suárez Navarro	(Romania) Alexandra Cadanțu (Romania) Sorana Cîrstea (Netherlands) Kiki Bertens (Italy) Maria Elena Camerin
July 18	2011 BCR Open Romania Ladies; Bucharest, Romania; Clay $100,000+H; Singles – Doubles	(Romania) Irina-Camelia Begu (Romania) Elena Bogdan; 6–7^{(1–7)}, 7–6^{(7–4)}, [16–14]	(Italy) Maria Elena Camerin (Turkey) İpek Şenoğlu	(Romania) Simona Halep (Spain) Carla Suárez Navarro	(Romania) Alexandra Cadanțu (Romania) Sorana Cîrstea (Netherlands) Kiki Bertens (Italy) Maria Elena Camerin
July 25	2011 ITS Cup; Olomouc, Czech Republic; Clay $50,000; Singles – Doubles	(Italy) Nastassya Burnett; 6–1, 6–3	(Czech Republic) Eva Birnerová	(Ukraine) Yuliya Beygelzimer (Slovenia) Nastja Kolar	(Bulgaria) Elitsa Kostova (Czech Republic) Renata Voráčová (Switzerland) Stefanie Vögele (Romania) Alexandra Cadanțu
July 25	2011 ITS Cup; Olomouc, Czech Republic; Clay $50,000; Singles – Doubles	(Netherlands) Michaëlla Krajicek (Czech Republic) Renata Voráčová; 7–5, 6–4	(Ukraine) Yuliya Beygelzimer (Romania) Elena Bogdan	(Ukraine) Yuliya Beygelzimer (Slovenia) Nastja Kolar	(Bulgaria) Elitsa Kostova (Czech Republic) Renata Voráčová (Switzerland) Stefanie Vögele (Romania) Alexandra Cadanțu
July 25	Vigo, Spain; Hard $25,000; Singles draw – Doubles draw	(France) Iryna Brémond; 7–6^{(7–3)}, 1–6, 7–6^{(7–3)}	(France) Julie Coin	(Japan) Misa Eguchi ju (Spain) Leticia Costas	(Venezuela) Marina Giral Lores (Portugal) Maria João Koehler (Netherlands) Richèl Hogenkamp (Argentina) Vanesa Furlanetto
July 25	Vigo, Spain; Hard $25,000; Singles draw – Doubles draw	(Italy) Claudia Giovine (Germany) Justine Ozga; 6–1, 6–3	(Argentina) Vanesa Furlanetto (Argentina) Aranza Salut	(Japan) Misa Eguchi ju (Spain) Leticia Costas	(Venezuela) Marina Giral Lores (Portugal) Maria João Koehler (Netherlands) Richèl Hogenkamp (Argentina) Vanesa Furlanetto
July 25	2011 Knoll Open; Bad Saulgau, Germany; Clay $25,000; Singles – Doubles	(Romania) Ioana Raluca Olaru; 3–6, 6–3, 7–5	(Germany) Tatjana Malek	(Germany) Laura Siegemund (Slovakia) Lenka Juríková	(Bosnia and Herzegovina) Mervana Jugić-Salkić (Italy) Anastasia Grymalska (Slovakia) Zuzana Luknárová (Ukraine) Oksana Lyubtsova
July 25	2011 Knoll Open; Bad Saulgau, Germany; Clay $25,000; Singles – Doubles	(Croatia) Maria Abramović (Italy) Nicole Clerico; 6–3, 5–7, [10–7]	(Colombia) Catalina Castaño (Colombia) Mariana Duque	(Germany) Laura Siegemund (Slovakia) Lenka Juríková	(Bosnia and Herzegovina) Mervana Jugić-Salkić (Italy) Anastasia Grymalska (Slovakia) Zuzana Luknárová (Ukraine) Oksana Lyubtsova
July 25	2011 MasterCard Tennis Cup; Campos do Jordão, Brazil; Hard $25,000; Singles – Doubles	(Paraguay) Verónica Cepede Royg; 7–6^{(7–4)}, 7–5	(Venezuela) Adriana Pérez	(Brazil) Vivian Segnini (Venezuela) Andrea Gámiz	(Brazil) Ana Clara Duarte (Argentina) Andrea Benítez (Chile) Andrea Koch Benvenuto (Brazil) Roxane Vaisemberg
July 25	2011 MasterCard Tennis Cup; Campos do Jordão, Brazil; Hard $25,000; Singles – Doubles	(Brazil) Fernanda Hermenegildo (Brazil) Teliana Pereira; 3–6, 7–6^{(7–5)}, [11–9]	(Brazil) Maria Fernanda Alves (Brazil) Roxane Vaisemberg	(Brazil) Vivian Segnini (Venezuela) Andrea Gámiz	(Brazil) Ana Clara Duarte (Argentina) Andrea Benítez (Chile) Andrea Koch Benvenuto (Brazil) Roxane Vaisemberg
July 25	Fergana, Uzbekistan; Hard $25,000; Singles draw – Doubles draw	(Indonesia) Ayu Fani Damayanti; 6–3, 6–4	(Chinese Taipei) Hsieh Su-wei	(France) Caroline Garcia (Uzbekistan) Nigina Abduraimova	(Japan) Mari Tanaka (Japan) Shiho Akita (Japan) Erika Takao (Indonesia) Jessy Rompies
July 25	Fergana, Uzbekistan; Hard $25,000; Singles draw – Doubles draw	(Uzbekistan) Nigina Abduraimova (Uzbekistan) Albina Khabibulina; 6–3, 6–3	(United States) Elizaveta Nemchinov (Turkmenistan) Anastasiya Prenko	(France) Caroline Garcia (Uzbekistan) Nigina Abduraimova	(Japan) Mari Tanaka (Japan) Shiho Akita (Japan) Erika Takao (Indonesia) Jessy Rompies
July 25	Chiswick, United Kingdom; Hard $10,000; Singles draw – Doubles draw	(Croatia) Donna Vekić; 3–6, 6–3, 6–3	(Australia) Bojana Bobusic	(Netherlands) Quirine Lemoine (Czech Republic) Kateřina Kramperová	(United Kingdom) Jade Windley (United Kingdom) Samantha Vickers (France) Irina Ramialison (Estonia) Margit Rüütel
July 25	Chiswick, United Kingdom; Hard $10,000; Singles draw – Doubles draw	(United Kingdom) Samantha Murray (United Kingdom) Jade Windley; 6–4, 6–4	(United Kingdom) Lucy Brown (United Kingdom) Francesca Stephenson	(Netherlands) Quirine Lemoine (Czech Republic) Kateřina Kramperová	(United Kingdom) Jade Windley (United Kingdom) Samantha Vickers (France) Irina Ramialison (Estonia) Margit Rüütel
July 25	Bad Waltersdorf, Austria; Clay $10,000; Singles draw – Doubles draw	(Russia) Victoria Kan; 7–6^{(7–3)}, 6–1	(Czech Republic) Kateřina Vaňková	(Hungary) Zsófia Mikó (Austria) Anna Maria Heil	(Italy) Giulia Pasini (Germany) Jasmin Steinherr (Austria) Iris Khanna (Austria) Jeannine Prentner
July 25	Bad Waltersdorf, Austria; Clay $10,000; Singles draw – Doubles draw	(Bosnia and Herzegovina) Sandra Martinović (Czech Republic) Kateřina Vaňková; 6–3, 3–6, [10–8]	(Austria) Pia König (Austria) Yvonne Neuwirth	(Hungary) Zsófia Mikó (Austria) Anna Maria Heil	(Italy) Giulia Pasini (Germany) Jasmin Steinherr (Austria) Iris Khanna (Austria) Jeannine Prentner
July 25	Palić, Serbia; Clay $10,000; Singles draw – Doubles draw	(Russia) Sabina Kurbanova; 1–6, 7–6^{(7–5)}, 6–3	(Czech Republic) Dana Machálková	(Poland) Natalia Kołat (Serbia) Dunja Šunkić	(Bulgaria) Julia Stamatova (Serbia) Nataša Zorić (Czech Republic) Lucie Kriegsmannová (Czech Republic) Tereza Malíková
July 25	Palić, Serbia; Clay $10,000; Singles draw – Doubles draw	(Poland) Olga Brózda (Poland) Natalia Kołat; 6–2, 6–3	(Romania) Karina Goia (Bulgaria) Dalia Zafirova	(Poland) Natalia Kołat (Serbia) Dunja Šunkić	(Bulgaria) Julia Stamatova (Serbia) Nataša Zorić (Czech Republic) Lucie Kriegsmannová (Czech Republic) Tereza Malíková
July 25	Maaseik, Belgium; Hard $10,000; Singles draw – Doubles draw	(Netherlands) Nicolette van Uitert; 6–4, 1–0, ret.	(Australia) Karolina Wlodarczak	(Belgium) Elyne Boeykens (Belgium) Nicky Van Dyck	(Bulgaria) Martina Gledacheva (Kazakhstan) Kamila Kerimbayeva (Germany) Katharina Holert (Slovakia) Lucia Butkovská
July 25	Maaseik, Belgium; Hard $10,000; Singles draw – Doubles draw	(Netherlands) Marcella Koek (Netherlands) Eva Wacanno; 7–5, 6–1	(Netherlands) Kim Kilsdonk (Netherlands) Nicolette van Uitert	(Belgium) Elyne Boeykens (Belgium) Nicky Van Dyck	(Bulgaria) Martina Gledacheva (Kazakhstan) Kamila Kerimbayeva (Germany) Katharina Holert (Slovakia) Lucia Butkovská
July 25	Tampere, Finland; Clay $10,000; Singles draw – Doubles draw	(Finland) Piia Suomalainen; 7–5, 6–0	(Germany) Dinah Pfizenmaier	(Finland) Emma Laine (Russia) Daria Mironova	(France) Amandine Hesse (Sweden) Evelina Virtanen (Russia) Julia Valetova (Estonia) Anett Kontaveit
July 25	Tampere, Finland; Clay $10,000; Singles draw – Doubles draw	(Finland) Leia Kaukonen (Russia) Polina Vinogradova; 7–5, 7–6^{(8–6)}	(Russia) Yanina Darishina (Russia) Liubov Vasilyeva	(Finland) Emma Laine (Russia) Daria Mironova	(France) Amandine Hesse (Sweden) Evelina Virtanen (Russia) Julia Valetova (Estonia) Anett Kontaveit
July 25	Saint Joseph, Missouri, United States; Hard $10,000; Singles draw – Doubles draw	(United States) Amanda McDowell; 6–0, 6–1	(United States) Denise Mureșan	(United States) Natalie Pluskota (Indonesia) Romana Tedjakusuma	(Japan) Mai Minokoshi (United States) Elizabeth Ferris (China) Wen Xin (Japan) Yuuki Tanaka
July 25	Saint Joseph, Missouri, United States; Hard $10,000; Singles draw – Doubles draw	(United States) Yawna Allen (Puerto Rico) Jessica Roland-Rosario; 2–6, 6–2, [10–5]	(Poland) Paulina Bigos (United States) Erin Clark	(United States) Natalie Pluskota (Indonesia) Romana Tedjakusuma	(Japan) Mai Minokoshi (United States) Elizabeth Ferris (China) Wen Xin (Japan) Yuuki Tanaka
July 25	El Jadida, Morocco; Clay $10,000; Singles draw – Doubles draw	(Spain) Yvonne Cavallé Reimers; 6–1, 6–0	(France) Sybille Gauvain	(Russia) Alena Tarasova (Tunisia) Nour Abbès	(Russia) Anna Morgina (Spain) Sheila Solsona Carcasona (Italy) Francesca Mazzali (Poland) Agata Barańska
July 25	El Jadida, Morocco; Clay $10,000; Singles draw – Doubles draw	(Spain) Carolina Prats Millán (Spain) Sheila Solsona Carcasona; 6–2, 6–1	(Spain) Yvonne Cavallé Reimers (Spain) Anna Montserrat Sánchez	(Russia) Alena Tarasova (Tunisia) Nour Abbès	(Russia) Anna Morgina (Spain) Sheila Solsona Carcasona (Italy) Francesca Mazzali (Poland) Agata Barańska
July 25	Gardone Val Trompia, Italy; Clay $10,000; Singles draw – Doubles draw	(Germany) Anne Schäfer; 7–6^{(8–6)}, 0–6, 6–4	(Italy) Martina Caregaro	(Italy) Alice Moroni (Italy) Benedetta Davato	(Australia) Stephanie Bengson (Italy) Valeria Prosperi (Japan) Yurina Koshino (Italy) Paola Cigui
July 25	Gardone Val Trompia, Italy; Clay $10,000; Singles draw – Doubles draw	(Japan) Yuka Higuchi (Japan) Hirono Watanabe; 6–1, 6–2	(Germany) Natalie Pröse (Switzerland) Mirjam Zeller	(Italy) Alice Moroni (Italy) Benedetta Davato	(Australia) Stephanie Bengson (Italy) Valeria Prosperi (Japan) Yurina Koshino (Italy) Paola Cigui
July 25	2011 President's Cup; Astana, Kazakhstan; Hard $100,000; Singles – Doubles	(Russia) Vitalia Diatchenko; 6–4, 6–1	(Uzbekistan) Akgul Amanmuradova	(Russia) Alexandra Panova (Belarus) Anastasiya Yakimova	(Ukraine) Veronika Kapshay (Russia) Ekaterina Bychkova (Ukraine) Lesia Tsurenko (Russia) Evgeniya Rodina
July 25	2011 President's Cup; Astana, Kazakhstan; Hard $100,000; Singles – Doubles	(Russia) Vitalia Diatchenko (Kazakhstan) Galina Voskoboeva; 6–3, 6–4	(Uzbekistan) Akgul Amanmuradova (Russia) Alexandra Panova	(Russia) Alexandra Panova (Belarus) Anastasiya Yakimova	(Ukraine) Veronika Kapshay (Russia) Ekaterina Bychkova (Ukraine) Lesia Tsurenko (Russia) Evgeniya Rodina

== August ==
Week of	Tournament	Winner	Runners-up	Semifinalists	Quarterfinalists
August 1	2011 Odlum Brown Vancouver Open; Vancouver, Canada; Hard $100,000; Singles – Doubles	(Canada) Aleksandra Wozniak; 6–3, 6–1	(United States) Jamie Hampton	(Greece) Eleni Daniilidou (United States) Irina Falconi	(Israel) Julia Glushko (United States) Julia Cohen (Croatia) Ajla Tomljanović (Poland) Urszula Radwańska
August 1	2011 Odlum Brown Vancouver Open; Vancouver, Canada; Hard $100,000; Singles – Doubles	(Czech Republic) Karolína Plíšková (Czech Republic) Kristýna Plíšková; 5–7, 6–2, [10–2]	(United States) Jamie Hampton (Thailand) Noppawan Lertcheewakarn	(Greece) Eleni Daniilidou (United States) Irina Falconi	(Israel) Julia Glushko (United States) Julia Cohen (Croatia) Ajla Tomljanović (Poland) Urszula Radwańska
August 1	2011 Beijing International Challenger; Beijing, China; Hard $75,000+H; Singles – Doubles	(Chinese Taipei) Hsieh Su-wei; 6–2, 6–2	(Japan) Kurumi Nara	(Ukraine) Tetiana Luzhanska (France) Irena Pavlovic	(Japan) Yurika Sema (China) Hu Yueyue (South Korea) Kim So-jung (Thailand) Varatchaya Wongteanchai
August 1	2011 Beijing International Challenger; Beijing, China; Hard $75,000+H; Singles – Doubles	(Chinese Taipei) Chan Hao-ching (Chinese Taipei) Chan Yung-jan; 6–2, 6–3	(Ukraine) Tetiana Luzhanska (China) Zheng Saisai	(Ukraine) Tetiana Luzhanska (France) Irena Pavlovic	(Japan) Yurika Sema (China) Hu Yueyue (South Korea) Kim So-jung (Thailand) Varatchaya Wongteanchai
August 1	2011 Empire Trnava Cup; Trnava, Slovakia; Clay $50,000; Singles – Doubles	(Austria) Yvonne Meusburger; 0–6, 6–2, 6–0	(Bulgaria) Elitsa Kostova	(Poland) Magda Linette (Czech Republic) Renata Voráčová	(Czech Republic) Sandra Záhlavová (Romania) Alexandra Cadanțu (Slovakia) Kristína Kučová (Slovakia) Lenka Juríková
August 1	2011 Empire Trnava Cup; Trnava, Slovakia; Clay $50,000; Singles – Doubles	(Slovakia) Janette Husárová (Czech Republic) Renata Voráčová; 7–6^{(7–2)}, 6–1	(Slovakia) Jana Čepelová (Slovakia) Lenka Wienerová	(Poland) Magda Linette (Czech Republic) Renata Voráčová	(Czech Republic) Sandra Záhlavová (Romania) Alexandra Cadanțu (Slovakia) Kristína Kučová (Slovakia) Lenka Juríková
August 1	2011 Monteroni International; Monteroni, Italy; Clay $25,000; Singles – Doubles	(Italy) Nastassya Burnett; 6–3, 7–6^{(9–7)}	(Italy) Anna Remondina	(Italy) Karin Knapp (Germany) Anne Schäfer	(Netherlands) Kiki Bertens (Austria) Nicole Rottmann (France) Alizé Lim (Italy) Anna Floris
August 1	2011 Monteroni International; Monteroni, Italy; Clay $25,000; Singles – Doubles	(Netherlands) Kiki Bertens (Austria) Nicole Rottmann; 6–0, 6–3	(Italy) Gioia Barbieri (Italy) Anastasia Grymalska	(Italy) Karin Knapp (Germany) Anne Schäfer	(Netherlands) Kiki Bertens (Austria) Nicole Rottmann (France) Alizé Lim (Italy) Anna Floris
August 1	2011 Moscow Open; Moscow, Russia; Clay $25,000; Singles – Doubles	(Ukraine) Valentyna Ivakhnenko; 6–1, 6–3	(Russia) Valeriya Solovyeva	(Russia) Ekaterina Bychkova (Lithuania) Lina Stančiūtė	(Ukraine) Kateryna Kozlova (Ukraine) Oksana Lyubtsova (Belarus) Polina Pekhova (Turkey) Pemra Özgen
August 1	2011 Moscow Open; Moscow, Russia; Clay $25,000; Singles – Doubles	(Ukraine) Valentyna Ivakhnenko (Ukraine) Kateryna Kozlova; 6–3, 6–0	(Hungary) Vaszilisza Bulgakova (Russia) Anna Rapoport	(Russia) Ekaterina Bychkova (Lithuania) Lina Stančiūtė	(Ukraine) Kateryna Kozlova (Ukraine) Oksana Lyubtsova (Belarus) Polina Pekhova (Turkey) Pemra Özgen
August 1	2011 Hechingen Ladies Open; Hechingen, Germany; Clay $25,000; Singles – Doubles	(Germany) Tatjana Malek; 6–3, 6–4	(Germany) Sarah Gronert	(Colombia) Catalina Castaño (Germany) Carina Witthöft	(Colombia) Mariana Duque (Croatia) Tereza Mrdeža (Germany) Korina Perkovic (Poland) Anna Korzeniak
August 1	2011 Hechingen Ladies Open; Hechingen, Germany; Clay $25,000; Singles – Doubles	(Austria) Sandra Klemenschits (Germany) Tatjana Malek; 4–6, 6–2, [10–7]	(Germany) Korina Perkovic (Germany) Laura Siegemund	(Colombia) Catalina Castaño (Germany) Carina Witthöft	(Colombia) Mariana Duque (Croatia) Tereza Mrdeža (Germany) Korina Perkovic (Poland) Anna Korzeniak
August 1	São Paulo, Brazil; Clay $10,000; Singles draw – Doubles draw	(Brazil) Maria Fernanda Alves; 4–6, 7–5, 6–3	(Brazil) Beatriz Haddad Maia	(Brazil) Nathalia Rossi (Brazil) Nathaly Kurata	(Brazil) Vivian Segnini (Chile) Belén Ludueña (Brazil) Fernanda Hermenegildo (Argentina) Agustína Serio
August 1	São Paulo, Brazil; Clay $10,000; Singles draw – Doubles draw	(Brazil) Carla Forte (Brazil) Beatriz Haddad Maia; 6–7^{(5–7)}, 6–3, [10–7]	(Paraguay) Isabella Robbiani (India) Kyra Shroff	(Brazil) Nathalia Rossi (Brazil) Nathaly Kurata	(Brazil) Vivian Segnini (Chile) Belén Ludueña (Brazil) Fernanda Hermenegildo (Argentina) Agustína Serio
August 1	Vienna, Austria; Clay $10,000; Singles draw – Doubles draw	(Belarus) Ilona Kremen; 6–1, 6–1	(Czech Republic) Kateřina Vaňková	(Bosnia and Herzegovina) Sandra Martinović (Czech Republic) Simona Dobrá	(Austria) Patricia Haas (Austria) Veronika Sepp (Czech Republic) Lucie Kriegsmannová (Czech Republic) Denisa Allertová
August 1	Vienna, Austria; Clay $10,000; Singles draw – Doubles draw	(Czech Republic) Simona Dobrá (Czech Republic) Lucie Kriegsmannová; 6–4, 6–1	(Bosnia and Herzegovina) Sandra Martinović (Austria) Janina Toljan	(Bosnia and Herzegovina) Sandra Martinović (Czech Republic) Simona Dobrá	(Austria) Patricia Haas (Austria) Veronika Sepp (Czech Republic) Lucie Kriegsmannová (Czech Republic) Denisa Allertová
August 1	Rebecq, Belgium; Clay $10,000; Singles draw – Doubles draw	(France) Constance Sibille; 6–3, 6–1	(Bulgaria) Martina Gledacheva	(Germany) Franziska Etzel (France) Céline Ghesquière	(Netherlands) Eva Wacanno (Belgium) Sofie Oyen (France) Victoire Mfoumouangana (Belgium) Ysaline Bonaventure
August 1	Rebecq, Belgium; Clay $10,000; Singles draw – Doubles draw	(Netherlands) Kim Kilsdonk (Netherlands) Nicolette van Uitert; 6–2, 6–2	(Belgium) Marie Benoît (Belgium) Kimberley Zimmermann	(Germany) Franziska Etzel (France) Céline Ghesquière	(Netherlands) Eva Wacanno (Belgium) Sofie Oyen (France) Victoire Mfoumouangana (Belgium) Ysaline Bonaventure
August 1	Savitaipale, Finland; Clay $10,000; Singles draw – Doubles draw	(Estonia) Anett Kontaveit; 6–3, 6–1	(Netherlands) Lisanne van Riet	(Russia) Ksenia Kirillova (Russia) Polina Vinogradova	(Finland) Piia Suomalainen (Russia) Daria Mironova (Germany) Dinah Pfizenmaier (Czech Republic) Nikola Horáková
August 1	Savitaipale, Finland; Clay $10,000; Singles draw – Doubles draw	(Russia) Ksenia Kirillova (Russia) Anastasia Vovk; 6–4, 7–6^{(8–6)}	(Sweden) Hilda Melander (Sweden) Paulina Milosavljevic	(Russia) Ksenia Kirillova (Russia) Polina Vinogradova	(Finland) Piia Suomalainen (Russia) Daria Mironova (Germany) Dinah Pfizenmaier (Czech Republic) Nikola Horáková
August 1	Istanbul, Turkey; Hard $10,000; Singles draw – Doubles draw	(Germany) Christina Shakovets; 6–2, 6–1	(Romania) Diana Stomlega	(France) Elixane Lechemia (Bulgaria) Isabella Shinikova	(Russia) Julia Samuseva (India) Ashvarya Shrivastava (Turkey) Seda Arantekin (Georgia (country)) Sofia Kvatsabaia
August 1	Istanbul, Turkey; Hard $10,000; Singles draw – Doubles draw	(France) Irina Ramialison (Bulgaria) Isabella Shinikova; 3–6, 6–1, [10–8]	(Ukraine) Khristina Kazimova (Germany) Christina Shakovets	(France) Elixane Lechemia (Bulgaria) Isabella Shinikova	(Russia) Julia Samuseva (India) Ashvarya Shrivastava (Turkey) Seda Arantekin (Georgia (country)) Sofia Kvatsabaia
August 1	Iława, Poland; Clay $10,000; Singles draw – Doubles draw	(Norway) Ulrikke Eikeri; 6–3, 6–2	(Czech Republic) Tereza Smitková	(Latvia) Lina Lileikite (Slovakia) Monika Širilová	(Vietnam) Huynh Phuong Dai Trang (Czech Republic) Martina Borecká (Italy) Stephanie Scimone (Poland) Veronika Domagała
August 1	Iława, Poland; Clay $10,000; Singles draw – Doubles draw	(Vietnam) Huynh Phuong Dai Trang (Poland) Magdalena Kiszczyńska; 2–6, 6–3, [10–7]	(Poland) Karolina Kosińska (Poland) Aleksandra Rosolska	(Latvia) Lina Lileikite (Slovakia) Monika Širilová	(Vietnam) Huynh Phuong Dai Trang (Czech Republic) Martina Borecká (Italy) Stephanie Scimone (Poland) Veronika Domagała
August 8	2011 Emblem Health Bronx Open; The Bronx, United States; Hard $50,000; Singles – Doubles	(Czech Republic) Andrea Hlaváčková; 7–6^{(10–8)}, 6–3	(Germany) Mona Barthel	(Italy) Camila Giorgi (Romania) Mădălina Gojnea	(Czech Republic) Karolína Plíšková (United States) Madison Brengle (Italy) Romina Oprandi (Belgium) Tamaryn Hendler
August 8	2011 Emblem Health Bronx Open; The Bronx, United States; Hard $50,000; Singles – Doubles	(United States) Megan Moulton-Levy (United States) Ahsha Rolle; 6–3, 7–6^{(7–5)}	(China) Han Xinyun (China) Lu Jingjing	(Italy) Camila Giorgi (Romania) Mădălina Gojnea	(Czech Republic) Karolína Plíšková (United States) Madison Brengle (Italy) Romina Oprandi (Belgium) Tamaryn Hendler
August 8	2011 Tatarstan Open; Kazan, Russia; Hard $50,000+H; Singles – Doubles	(Russia) Yulia Putintseva; 6–4, 6–2	(France) Caroline Garcia	(Belarus) Anastasiya Yakimova (Russia) Vitalia Diatchenko	(Russia) Evgeniya Rodina (Russia) Alexandra Panova (Ukraine) Valentyna Ivakhnenko (Romania) Mihaela Buzărnescu
August 8	2011 Tatarstan Open; Kazan, Russia; Hard $50,000+H; Singles – Doubles	(Russia) Ekaterina Ivanova (Slovenia) Andreja Klepač w/o	(Russia) Vitalia Diatchenko (Russia) Alexandra Panova	(Belarus) Anastasiya Yakimova (Russia) Vitalia Diatchenko	(Russia) Evgeniya Rodina (Russia) Alexandra Panova (Ukraine) Valentyna Ivakhnenko (Romania) Mihaela Buzărnescu
August 8	2011 Flanders Ladies Trophy Koksijde; Koksijde, Belgium; Clay $25,000; Singles – Doubles	(Netherlands) Kiki Bertens; 6–2, 6–1	(Bulgaria) Elitsa Kostova	(Netherlands) Bibiane Schoofs (Italy) Annalisa Bona	(France) Audrey Bergot (Slovakia) Jana Čepelová (Spain) Inés Ferrer Suárez (Russia) Irina Khromacheva
August 8	2011 Flanders Ladies Trophy Koksijde; Koksijde, Belgium; Clay $25,000; Singles – Doubles	(Netherlands) Kim Kilsdonk (Netherlands) Nicolette van Uitert; 5–7, 6–3, [10–8]	(Belgium) Elyne Boeykens (Belgium) Nicky Van Dyck	(Netherlands) Bibiane Schoofs (Italy) Annalisa Bona	(France) Audrey Bergot (Slovakia) Jana Čepelová (Spain) Inés Ferrer Suárez (Russia) Irina Khromacheva
August 8	2011 Reinert Open; Versmold, Germany; Clay $25,000; Singles – Doubles	(Colombia) Mariana Duque; 7–6^{(7–2)}, 7–5	(Germany) Scarlett Werner	(Germany) Nina Zander (Slovenia) Maša Zec Peškirič	(Bulgaria) Dia Evtimova (Colombia) Catalina Castaño (Germany) Dinah Pfizenmaier (Germany) Tatjana Malek
August 8	2011 Reinert Open; Versmold, Germany; Clay $25,000; Singles – Doubles	(Ukraine) Elizaveta Ianchuk (Italy) Julia Mayr; 6–4, 6–3	(Chile) Cecilia Costa Melgar (Chile) Daniela Seguel	(Germany) Nina Zander (Slovenia) Maša Zec Peškirič	(Bulgaria) Dia Evtimova (Colombia) Catalina Castaño (Germany) Dinah Pfizenmaier (Germany) Tatjana Malek
August 8	Locri, Italy; Clay $10,000; Singles draw – Doubles draw	(Italy) Agnese Zucchini; 2–6, 7–5, 6–4	(Norway) Ulrikke Eikeri	(France) Anaève Pain (Italy) Federica Di Sarra	(Italy) Erika Zanchetta (Japan) Yuka Higuchi (Italy) Carolina Pillot (France) Amandine Hesse
August 8	Locri, Italy; Clay $10,000; Singles draw – Doubles draw	(Japan) Yuka Higuchi (Japan) Hirono Watanabe; 3–6, 6–3, [10–8]	(Italy) Alessia Camplone (Norway) Ulrikke Eikeri	(France) Anaève Pain (Italy) Federica Di Sarra	(Italy) Erika Zanchetta (Japan) Yuka Higuchi (Italy) Carolina Pillot (France) Amandine Hesse
August 8	Bucharest, Romania; Clay $10,000; Singles draw – Doubles draw	(Romania) Cristina Dinu; 7–6^{(7–5)}, 6–4	(Romania) Cristina Mitu	(France) Morgane Pons (Romania) Raluca Elena Platon	(Netherlands) Lisanne van Riet (Romania) Sabina Lupu (Slovakia) Lucia Butkovská (Italy) Andreea Văideanu
August 8	Bucharest, Romania; Clay $10,000; Singles draw – Doubles draw	(Romania) Cristina Dinu (Romania) Camelia Hristea; 1–6, 7–6^{(8–6)}, [10–4]	(Romania) Alexandra Damaschin (Romania) Cristina Mitu	(France) Morgane Pons (Romania) Raluca Elena Platon	(Netherlands) Lisanne van Riet (Romania) Sabina Lupu (Slovakia) Lucia Butkovská (Italy) Andreea Văideanu
August 8	Innsbruck, Austria; Clay $10,000; Singles draw – Doubles draw	(Czech Republic) Martina Kubičíková; 6–7^{(5–7)}, 7–5, 7–5	(Czech Republic) Zuzana Zálabská	(Russia) Victoria Kan (Italy) Sara Sussarello	(Germany) Jasmin Steinherr (Belarus) Ilona Kremen (Austria) Veronika Sepp (Austria) Janina Toljan
August 8	Innsbruck, Austria; Clay $10,000; Singles draw – Doubles draw	(Russia) Victoria Kan (Belarus) Ilona Kremen; 2–6, 6–3, [10–8]	(Austria) Patricia Haas (Austria) Veronika Sepp	(Russia) Victoria Kan (Italy) Sara Sussarello	(Germany) Jasmin Steinherr (Belarus) Ilona Kremen (Austria) Veronika Sepp (Austria) Janina Toljan
August 8	Gijón, Spain; Hard $10,000; Singles draw – Doubles draw	(Spain) Arabela Fernández Rabener; 6–3, 6–4	(Romania) Diana Stomlega	(Poland) Sylwia Zagórska (Republic of Ireland) Amy Bowtell	(Poland) Natalia Siedliska (Spain) Yvonne Cavallé Reimers (United Kingdom) Amanda Carreras (Germany) Karolina Nowak
August 8	Gijón, Spain; Hard $10,000; Singles draw – Doubles draw	(Republic of Ireland) Amy Bowtell (United Kingdom) Lucy Brown w/o	(United Kingdom) Amanda Carreras (Venezuela) Andrea Gámiz	(Poland) Sylwia Zagórska (Republic of Ireland) Amy Bowtell	(Poland) Natalia Siedliska (Spain) Yvonne Cavallé Reimers (United Kingdom) Amanda Carreras (Germany) Karolina Nowak
August 8	Istanbul, Turkey; Clay $10,000; Singles draw – Doubles draw	(Hungary) Réka-Luca Jani; 6–4, 6–1	(Germany) Christina Shakovets	(Netherlands) Quirine Lemoine (France) Julie Coin	(Belarus) Sasha Khabibulina (Spain) Rocío de la Torre-Sánchez (Russia) Julia Samuseva (France) Irina Ramialison
August 8	Istanbul, Turkey; Clay $10,000; Singles draw – Doubles draw	(Portugal) Magali de Lattre (United Kingdom) Lisa Whybourn; 6–3, 2–6, [12–10]	(Georgia (country)) Sofia Kvatsabaia (Bulgaria) Isabella Shinikova	(Netherlands) Quirine Lemoine (France) Julie Coin	(Belarus) Sasha Khabibulina (Spain) Rocío de la Torre-Sánchez (Russia) Julia Samuseva (France) Irina Ramialison
August 8	Taipei, Chinese Taipei; Hard $10,000; Singles draw – Doubles draw	(South Korea) Han Na-lae; 6–3, ret.	(Japan) Emi Mutaguchi	(Russia) Anna Tyulpa (Japan) Mari Tanaka	(Chinese Taipei) Hsu Wen-hsin (Indonesia) Grace Sari Ysidora (Thailand) Peangtarn Plipuech (Japan) Aki Yamasoto
August 8	Taipei, Chinese Taipei; Hard $10,000; Singles draw – Doubles draw	(Chinese Taipei) Kao Shao-yuan (Thailand) Peangtarn Plipuech; 6–3, 6–4	(Chinese Taipei) Chan Hao-ching (Chinese Taipei) Chen Yi	(Russia) Anna Tyulpa (Japan) Mari Tanaka	(Chinese Taipei) Hsu Wen-hsin (Indonesia) Grace Sari Ysidora (Thailand) Peangtarn Plipuech (Japan) Aki Yamasoto
August 8	Doboj, Bosnia and Herzegovina; Clay $10,000; Singles draw – Doubles draw	(Croatia) Indire Akiki; 6–3, 6–1	(Slovakia) Vivien Juhászová	(Czech Republic) Martina Borecká (France) Gracia Radovanovic	(Slovakia) Zuzana Zlochová (Poland) Barbara Sobaszkiewicz (Serbia) Dunja Šunkić (Italy) Nicole Clerico
August 8	Doboj, Bosnia and Herzegovina; Clay $10,000; Singles draw – Doubles draw	(Slovakia) Vivien Juhászová (Poland) Barbara Sobaszkiewicz; 7–5, 6–3	(Czech Republic) Martina Borecká (Czech Republic) Petra Krejsová	(Czech Republic) Martina Borecká (France) Gracia Radovanovic	(Slovakia) Zuzana Zlochová (Poland) Barbara Sobaszkiewicz (Serbia) Dunja Šunkić (Italy) Nicole Clerico
August 8	São Paulo, Brazil; Clay $10,000; Singles draw – Doubles draw	(Brazil) Nathalia Rossi; 6–2, 6–3	(Peru) Patricia Kú Flores	(Brazil) Nathaly Kurata (Paraguay) Isabella Robbiani	(Brazil) Eduarda Piai (Brazil) Beatriz Haddad Maia (Brazil) Gabriela Cé (Argentina) Carolina Zeballos
August 8	São Paulo, Brazil; Clay $10,000; Singles draw – Doubles draw	(Brazil) Maria Fernanda Alves (Brazil) Fernanda Hermenegildo; 7–6^{(8–6)}, 4–6, [14–12]	(Brazil) Eduarda Piai (Brazil) Karina Souza	(Brazil) Nathaly Kurata (Paraguay) Isabella Robbiani	(Brazil) Eduarda Piai (Brazil) Beatriz Haddad Maia (Brazil) Gabriela Cé (Argentina) Carolina Zeballos
August 8	Santa Cruz de la Sierra, Bolivia; Clay $10,000; Singles draw – Doubles draw	(Argentina) María Irigoyen; 6–2, 6–3	(Chile) Andrea Koch Benvenuto	(Argentina) Carla Lucero (Bolivia) María Inés Deheza	(Bolivia) María Paula Deheza (Argentina) Paula López (Argentina) Tatiana Búa (Argentina) Guadalupe Moreno
August 8	Santa Cruz de la Sierra, Bolivia; Clay $10,000; Singles draw – Doubles draw	(Argentina) María Irigoyen (Chile) Andrea Koch Benvenuto; 6–2, 6–1	(Paraguay) Jazmin Britos (Brazil) Giovanna Tomita	(Argentina) Carla Lucero (Bolivia) María Inés Deheza	(Bolivia) María Paula Deheza (Argentina) Paula López (Argentina) Tatiana Búa (Argentina) Guadalupe Moreno
August 15	Todi, Italy; Clay $10,000; Singles draw – Doubles draw	(Italy) Alice Moroni; 6–1, 4–6, 6–3	(Italy) Alice Balducci	(Italy) Benedetta Davato (Italy) Federica Di Sarra	(Germany) Karolina Nowak (Italy) Erika Zanchetta (Italy) Chiara Mendo (Italy) Federica Quercia
August 15	Todi, Italy; Clay $10,000; Singles draw – Doubles draw	(Italy) Federica Di Sarra (Italy) Angelica Moratelli; 7–6^{(8–6)}, 7–5	(Australia) Stephanie Bengson (United States) Kirsten Flower	(Italy) Benedetta Davato (Italy) Federica Di Sarra	(Germany) Karolina Nowak (Italy) Erika Zanchetta (Italy) Chiara Mendo (Italy) Federica Quercia
August 15	Ratingen, Germany; Clay $10,000; Singles draw – Doubles draw	(Germany) Scarlett Werner; 6–0, 7–5	(Ukraine) Elizaveta Ianchuk	(Germany) Dinah Pfizenmaier (Germany) Anna Klasen	(Australia) Karolina Wlodarczak (Russia) Marina Melnikova (Germany) Franziska Etzel (Poland) Sandra Zaniewska
August 15	Ratingen, Germany; Clay $10,000; Singles draw – Doubles draw	(Ukraine) Elizaveta Ianchuk (Australia) Karolina Wlodarczak; 3–6, 6–1, [10–2]	(Germany) Katharina Hering (Germany) Dinah Pfizenmaier	(Germany) Dinah Pfizenmaier (Germany) Anna Klasen	(Australia) Karolina Wlodarczak (Russia) Marina Melnikova (Germany) Franziska Etzel (Poland) Sandra Zaniewska
August 15	Westende-Middlekerke, Belgium; Hard $10,000; Singles draw – Doubles draw	(China) Lu Jiajing; 6–4, 7–6^{(7–4)}	(Croatia) Donna Vekić	(France) Émilie Bacquet (Republic of Ireland) Amy Bowtell	(Belgium) Elyne Boeykens (Spain) Isabel Rapisarda-Calvo (Belgium) Kimberley Zimmermann (Germany) Julia Wachaczyk
August 15	Westende-Middlekerke, Belgium; Hard $10,000; Singles draw – Doubles draw	(Croatia) Donna Vekić (United Kingdom) Alexandra Walker; 6–4, 6–3	(Belgium) Anouk Delefortrie (Belgium) Deborah Kerfs	(France) Émilie Bacquet (Republic of Ireland) Amy Bowtell	(Belgium) Elyne Boeykens (Spain) Isabel Rapisarda-Calvo (Belgium) Kimberley Zimmermann (Germany) Julia Wachaczyk
August 15	Saint Petersburg, Russia; Clay $10,000; Singles draw – Doubles draw	(Russia) Polina Vinogradova; 3–6, 6–2, 6–1	(Russia) Tatiana Kotelnikova	(Russia) Elena Kulikova (Russia) Julia Samuseva	(Russia) Margarita Gasparyan (Russia) Daria Mironova (Russia) Anna Smolina (Russia) Polina Rodionova
August 15	Saint Petersburg, Russia; Clay $10,000; Singles draw – Doubles draw	(Russia) Anastasia Frolova (Russia) Polina Vinogradova; 6–2, 6–2	(Russia) Tatiana Kotelnikova (Russia) Maria Zharkova	(Russia) Elena Kulikova (Russia) Julia Samuseva	(Russia) Margarita Gasparyan (Russia) Daria Mironova (Russia) Anna Smolina (Russia) Polina Rodionova
August 15	Piešťany, Slovakia; Clay $10,000; Singles draw – Doubles draw	(Sweden) Hilda Melander; 6–3, 6–3	(Czech Republic) Denisa Allertová	(Slovakia) Klaudia Boczová (Czech Republic) Martina Borecká	(Poland) Paula Kania (Czech Republic) Tereza Martincová (Czech Republic) Martina Kubičíková (Czech Republic) Diana Šumová
August 15	Piešťany, Slovakia; Clay $10,000; Singles draw – Doubles draw	(Czech Republic) Simona Dobrá (Czech Republic) Lucie Kriegsmannová; 6–4, 6–2	(Poland) Paula Kania (Czech Republic) Martina Kubičíková	(Slovakia) Klaudia Boczová (Czech Republic) Martina Borecká	(Poland) Paula Kania (Czech Republic) Tereza Martincová (Czech Republic) Martina Kubičíková (Czech Republic) Diana Šumová
August 15	Istanbul, Turkey; Hard $10,000; Singles draw – Doubles draw	(Ukraine) Elina Svitolina; 6–2, 6–7^{(5–7)}, 6–0	(Slovenia) Anja Prislan	(Uzbekistan) Vlada Ekshibarova (Sweden) Ellen Allgurin	(Romania) Ana Bogdan (Germany) Christina Shakovets (United Kingdom) Tara Moore (Portugal) Magali de Lattre
August 15	Istanbul, Turkey; Hard $10,000; Singles draw – Doubles draw	(Germany) Christina Shakovets (India) Ashvarya Shrivastava; 6–1, 6–3	(United Kingdom) Tara Moore (United Kingdom) Lisa Whybourn	(Uzbekistan) Vlada Ekshibarova (Sweden) Ellen Allgurin	(Romania) Ana Bogdan (Germany) Christina Shakovets (United Kingdom) Tara Moore (Portugal) Magali de Lattre
August 15	Arad, Romania; Clay $10,000; Singles draw – Doubles draw	(Romania) Diana Enache; 6–1, 1–0, ret.	(Romania) Raluca Elena Platon	(Romania) Cristina Mitu (Romania) Ioana Loredana Roșca	(France) Morgane Pons (Romania) Elena-Theodora Cadar (China) Liu Min (Czech Republic) Tereza Smitková
August 15	Arad, Romania; Clay $10,000; Singles draw – Doubles draw	(Romania) Diana Enache (Italy) Andreea Văideanu; 6–3, 6–7^{(4–7)}, [16–14]	(Romania) Bianca Hincu (Romania) Diana Marcu	(Romania) Cristina Mitu (Romania) Ioana Loredana Roșca	(France) Morgane Pons (Romania) Elena-Theodora Cadar (China) Liu Min (Czech Republic) Tereza Smitková
August 15	Taipei, Chinese Taipei; Hard $10,000; Singles draw – Doubles draw	(Chinese Taipei) Lee Hua-chen; 6–2, 6–2	(Chinese Taipei) Lee Ya-hsuan	(South Korea) Han Na-lae (Indonesia) Grace Sari Ysidora	(Chinese Taipei) Chen Yi (Japan) Mari Tanaka (South Korea) Lee So-ra (China) Yang Zi
August 15	Taipei, Chinese Taipei; Hard $10,000; Singles draw – Doubles draw	(Japan) Miyabi Inoue (Japan) Mari Tanaka; 7–5, 2–6, [10–7]	(South Korea) Chae Kyung-yee (South Korea) Kim Hae-sung	(South Korea) Han Na-lae (Indonesia) Grace Sari Ysidora	(Chinese Taipei) Chen Yi (Japan) Mari Tanaka (South Korea) Lee So-ra (China) Yang Zi
August 15	Brčko, Bosnia and Herzegovina; Clay $10,000; Singles draw – Doubles draw	(Slovenia) Tjaša Šrimpf; 6–3, 6–3	(Croatia) Tena Lukas	(Bulgaria) Dalia Zafirova (Bulgaria) Julia Stamatova	(Portugal) Bárbara Luz (France) Gracia Radovanovic (Slovakia) Vivien Juhászová (Serbia) Saška Gavrilovska
August 15	Brčko, Bosnia and Herzegovina; Clay $10,000; Singles draw – Doubles draw	(Croatia) Silvia Njirić (Slovakia) Zuzana Zlochová; 6–4, 6–3	(Italy) Nicole Clerico (Italy) Maria Masini	(Bulgaria) Dalia Zafirova (Bulgaria) Julia Stamatova	(Portugal) Bárbara Luz (France) Gracia Radovanovic (Slovakia) Vivien Juhászová (Serbia) Saška Gavrilovska
August 15	La Paz, Bolivia; Clay $10,000; Singles draw – Doubles draw	(Chile) Andrea Koch Benvenuto; 6–0, 7–6^{(7–1)}	(Argentina) María Irigoyen	(Argentina) Guadalupe Moreno (Brazil) Maria Fernanda Alves	(Paraguay) Jazmin Britos (Peru) Patricia Kú Flores (Argentina) Carla Lucero (United States) Libby Muma
August 15	La Paz, Bolivia; Clay $10,000; Singles draw – Doubles draw	(Argentina) María Irigoyen (Chile) Andrea Koch Benvenuto; 6–2, 6–2	(Argentina) Carla Lucero (Argentina) Luciana Sarmenti	(Argentina) Guadalupe Moreno (Brazil) Maria Fernanda Alves	(Paraguay) Jazmin Britos (Peru) Patricia Kú Flores (Argentina) Carla Lucero (United States) Libby Muma
August 22	2011 ITK Open; Istanbul, Turkey; Hard $50,000; Singles – Doubles	(France) Victoria Larrière; 6–3, 1–6, 7–5	(Germany) Sarah Gronert	(Germany) Annika Beck (Bosnia and Herzegovina) Jasmina Tinjić	(Georgia (country)) Sofia Shapatava (Italy) Gioia Barbieri (Japan) Ryōko Fuda (Ukraine) Elina Svitolina
August 22	2011 ITK Open; Istanbul, Turkey; Hard $50,000; Singles – Doubles	(France) Julie Coin (Czech Republic) Eva Hrdinová; 6–4, 7–5	(Austria) Sandra Klemenschits (France) Irena Pavlovic	(Germany) Annika Beck (Bosnia and Herzegovina) Jasmina Tinjić	(Georgia (country)) Sofia Shapatava (Italy) Gioia Barbieri (Japan) Ryōko Fuda (Ukraine) Elina Svitolina
August 22	2011 Synot Tip Open; Prague-Neride, Czech Republic; Clay $25,000; Singles – Doubles	(Slovakia) Jana Čepelová; 7–6^{(8–6)}, 6–4	(Netherlands) Bibiane Schoofs	(Czech Republic) Sandra Záhlavová (Austria) Tina Schiechtl	(Italy) Annalisa Bona (Switzerland) Conny Perrin (Argentina) Paula Ormaechea (Slovenia) Maša Zec Peškirič
August 22	2011 Synot Tip Open; Prague-Neride, Czech Republic; Clay $25,000; Singles – Doubles	(Czech Republic) Iveta Gerlová (Czech Republic) Lucie Kriegsmannová; 6–7^{(8–10)}, 6–1, [10–8]	(Slovakia) Jana Čepelová (Poland) Katarzyna Piter	(Czech Republic) Sandra Záhlavová (Austria) Tina Schiechtl	(Italy) Annalisa Bona (Switzerland) Conny Perrin (Argentina) Paula Ormaechea (Slovenia) Maša Zec Peškirič
August 22	Bagnatica, Italy; Clay $10,000; Singles draw – Doubles draw	(Norway) Ulrikke Eikeri; 6–4, 6–4	(Armenia) Ani Amiraghyan	(Italy) Elisa Balsamo (Italy) Alice Moroni	(Italy) Federica Quercia (Bosnia and Herzegovina) Jelena Simić (Italy) Benedetta Davato (Italy) Giulia Gabba
August 22	Bagnatica, Italy; Clay $10,000; Singles draw – Doubles draw	(Italy) Alice Balducci (Italy) Benedetta Davato; 6–4, 6–7^{(8–10)}, [12–10]	(Australia) Stephanie Bengson (United States) Kirsten Flower	(Italy) Elisa Balsamo (Italy) Alice Moroni	(Italy) Federica Quercia (Bosnia and Herzegovina) Jelena Simić (Italy) Benedetta Davato (Italy) Giulia Gabba
August 22	Vinkovci, Croatia; Clay $10,000; Singles draw – Doubles draw	(Croatia) Indire Akiki; 3–6, 6–0, 6–2	(Serbia) Jovana Jakšić	(Austria) Katharina Negrin (Russia) Maria Mokh	(Croatia) Katja Milas (Serbia) Nataša Zorić (Croatia) Tena Lukas (Germany) Sarah-Rebecca Sekulic
August 22	Vinkovci, Croatia; Clay $10,000; Singles draw – Doubles draw	(Croatia) Silvia Njirić (Croatia) Karla Popović; 6–2, 6–3	(Germany) Lisa Brinkmann (Russia) Maria Mokh	(Austria) Katharina Negrin (Russia) Maria Mokh	(Croatia) Katja Milas (Serbia) Nataša Zorić (Croatia) Tena Lukas (Germany) Sarah-Rebecca Sekulic
August 22	Pörtschach, Austria; Clay $10,000; Singles draw – Doubles draw	(Russia) Victoria Kan; 4–6, 6–2, 6–3	(Czech Republic) Diana Šumová	(Czech Republic) Martina Kubičíková (Austria) Veronika Sepp	(Czech Republic) Kateřina Vaňková (Belarus) Ilona Kremen (Italy) Francesca Fusinato (Germany) Jasmin Steinherr
August 22	Pörtschach, Austria; Clay $10,000; Singles draw – Doubles draw	(Russia) Victoria Kan (Belarus) Ilona Kremen; 6–1, 6–3	(Austria) Pia König (Austria) Yvonne Neuwirth	(Czech Republic) Martina Kubičíková (Austria) Veronika Sepp	(Czech Republic) Kateřina Vaňková (Belarus) Ilona Kremen (Italy) Francesca Fusinato (Germany) Jasmin Steinherr
August 22	Braunschweig, Germany; Clay $10,000; Singles draw – Doubles draw	(Germany) Dinah Pfizenmaier; 7–6^{(7–5)}, 6–1	(Germany) Syna Kayser	(Germany) Katharina Lehnert (Germany) Vanessa Henke	(Germany) Korina Perkovic (Germany) Vivian Heisen (Denmark) Karen Barbat (Germany) Anna-Lena Friedsam
August 22	Braunschweig, Germany; Clay $10,000; Singles draw – Doubles draw	(Denmark) Karen Barbat (Vietnam) Huynh Phuong Dai Trang; 6–2, 6–4	(Germany) Sabrina Baumgarten (Germany) Katharina Lehnert	(Germany) Katharina Lehnert (Germany) Vanessa Henke	(Germany) Korina Perkovic (Germany) Vivian Heisen (Denmark) Karen Barbat (Germany) Anna-Lena Friedsam
August 22	Enschede, Netherlands; Clay $10,000; Singles draw – Doubles draw	(Bosnia and Herzegovina) Sandra Martinović; 2–6, 6–4, 6–4	(Netherlands) Lesley Kerkhove	(Germany) Franziska Etzel (France) Morgane Pons	(Netherlands) Bernice van de Velde (Netherlands) Lisanne van Riet (Poland) Agata Barańska (Netherlands) Nicolette van Uitert
August 22	Enschede, Netherlands; Clay $10,000; Singles draw – Doubles draw	(Germany) Anna-Maria Levers (Germany) Catrin Levers; 6–1, 7–6^{(7–4)}	(Poland) Natalia Siedliska (Poland) Sylwia Zagórska	(Germany) Franziska Etzel (France) Morgane Pons	(Netherlands) Bernice van de Velde (Netherlands) Lisanne van Riet (Poland) Agata Barańska (Netherlands) Nicolette van Uitert
August 22	Baulet-Charleroi, Belgium; Clay $10,000; Singles draw – Doubles draw	(Kyrgyzstan) Bermet Duvanaeva; 2–6, 7–5, 6–1	(Bulgaria) Martina Gledacheva	(Czech Republic) Veronika Kolářová (China) Deng Ming Neng	(Belgium) Nicky Van Dyck (United Kingdom) Alexandra Walker (Poland) Magdalena Kiszczyńska (Australia) Karolina Wlodarczak
August 22	Baulet-Charleroi, Belgium; Clay $10,000; Singles draw – Doubles draw	(China) Lu Jia Xiang (China) Lu Jiajing; 6–3, 6–0	(Poland) Magdalena Kiszczyńska (Australia) Karolina Wlodarczak	(Czech Republic) Veronika Kolářová (China) Deng Ming Neng	(Belgium) Nicky Van Dyck (United Kingdom) Alexandra Walker (Poland) Magdalena Kiszczyńska (Australia) Karolina Wlodarczak
August 22	Bucharest, Romania; Clay $10,000; Singles draw – Doubles draw	(Ukraine) Viktoriya Kutuzova; 6–2, 7–5	(Romania) Laura-Ioana Andrei	(Japan) Mai Minokoshi (Italy) Andreea Văideanu	(Romania) Camelia Hristea (Romania) Sabina Lupu (Romania) Ionela-Andreea Iova (Romania) Raluca Elena Platon
August 22	Bucharest, Romania; Clay $10,000; Singles draw – Doubles draw	(Romania) Laura-Ioana Andrei (Romania) Camelia Hristea; 6–1, 7–5	(Romania) Ionela-Andreea Iova (Italy) Andreea Văideanu	(Japan) Mai Minokoshi (Italy) Andreea Văideanu	(Romania) Camelia Hristea (Romania) Sabina Lupu (Romania) Ionela-Andreea Iova (Romania) Raluca Elena Platon
August 22	Mogi das Cruzes, Brazil; Clay $10,000; Singles draw – Doubles draw	(Brazil) Maria Fernanda Alves; 6–1, 6–4	(Brazil) Nathalia Rossi	(Brazil) Natasha Lotuffo (Brazil) Eduarda Piai	(Brazil) Paula Feitosa (Brazil) Flávia Guimarães Bueno (Brazil) Liz Tatiane Koehler Bogarin (Brazil) Gabriela Cé
August 22	Mogi das Cruzes, Brazil; Clay $10,000; Singles draw – Doubles draw	(Brazil) Flávia Dechandt Araújo (Brazil) Laura Pigossi; 7–6^{(7–3)}, 4–6, [12–10]	(Brazil) Eduarda Piai (Brazil) Karina Venditti	(Brazil) Natasha Lotuffo (Brazil) Eduarda Piai	(Brazil) Paula Feitosa (Brazil) Flávia Guimarães Bueno (Brazil) Liz Tatiane Koehler Bogarin (Brazil) Gabriela Cé
August 22	Saitama, Japan; Hard $10,000; Singles draw – Doubles draw	(Japan) Ayumi Oka; 6–3, 6–4	(China) Duan Yingying	(Hong Kong) Chan Wing-yau (China) Hu Yueyue	(Japan) Maya Kato (Japan) Mami Adachi (Japan) Chihiro Takayama (China) Liang Chen
August 22	Saitama, Japan; Hard $10,000; Singles draw – Doubles draw	(China) Liang Chen (China) Liu Wanting; 6–3, 5–7, [11–9]	(Japan) Akari Inoue (Japan) Ayumi Oka	(Hong Kong) Chan Wing-yau (China) Hu Yueyue	(Japan) Maya Kato (Japan) Mami Adachi (Japan) Chihiro Takayama (China) Liang Chen
August 22	San Luis Potosí, Mexico; Hard $10,000; Singles draw – Doubles draw	(Puerto Rico) Monica Puig; 6–3, 6–0	(Russia) Nika Kukharchuk	(Mexico) Nadia Abdala (United States) Lena Litvak	(Belarus) Sasha Khabibulina (Mexico) Carolina Betancourt (Japan) Mayo Hibi (Puerto Rico) Jessica Roland-Rosario
August 22	San Luis Potosí, Mexico; Hard $10,000; Singles draw – Doubles draw	(Russia) Nika Kukharchuk (United States) Lena Litvak; 6–1, 6–4	(Argentina) Andrea Benítez (United States) Margaret Lumia	(Mexico) Nadia Abdala (United States) Lena Litvak	(Belarus) Sasha Khabibulina (Mexico) Carolina Betancourt (Japan) Mayo Hibi (Puerto Rico) Jessica Roland-Rosario
August 22	Cochabamba, Bolivia; Clay $10,000; Singles draw – Doubles draw	(Slovakia) Lenka Broošová; 7–5, 6–7^{(7–9)}, 6–2	(Argentina) Tatiana Búa	(Argentina) María Irigoyen (Peru) Patricia Kú Flores	(Argentina) Guadalupe Moreno (Argentina) Carla Lucero (Argentina) Barbara Montiel (Argentina) Ornella Caron
August 22	Cochabamba, Bolivia; Clay $10,000; Singles draw – Doubles draw	(Argentina) María Irigoyen (Argentina) Carla Lucero; 6–2, 6–3	(Slovakia) Lenka Broošová (Romania) Daiana Negreanu	(Argentina) María Irigoyen (Peru) Patricia Kú Flores	(Argentina) Guadalupe Moreno (Argentina) Carla Lucero (Argentina) Barbara Montiel (Argentina) Ornella Caron
August 29	2011 Mamaia Idu Trophy; Mamaia, Romania; Clay $25,000; Singles – Doubles	(Romania) Cristina Mitu; 6–3, 6–0	(Spain) Inés Ferrer Suárez	(Ukraine) Viktoriya Kutuzova (Romania) Cristina Dinu	(Spain) Eva Fernández Brugués (Georgia (country)) Sofia Shapatava (Italy) Andreea Văideanu (Romania) Patricia Maria Țig
August 29	2011 Mamaia Idu Trophy; Mamaia, Romania; Clay $25,000; Singles – Doubles	(Romania) Elena Bogdan (Romania) Alexandra Cadanțu; 6–2, 6–2	(Russia) Marina Shamayko (Georgia (country)) Sofia Shapatava	(Ukraine) Viktoriya Kutuzova (Romania) Cristina Dinu	(Spain) Eva Fernández Brugués (Georgia (country)) Sofia Shapatava (Italy) Andreea Văideanu (Romania) Patricia Maria Țig
August 29	2011 Sekisho Challenge Open; Tsukuba, Ibaraki, Japan; Hard $25,000; Singles – Doubles	(Japan) Aiko Nakamura; 6–3, 2–6, 6–3	(Chinese Taipei) Chan Chin-wei	(Japan) Misa Eguchi (Belgium) Tamaryn Hendler	(Japan) Erika Sema (China) Wang Qiang (China) Hu Yueyue (Chinese Taipei) Hsu Wen-hsin
August 29	2011 Sekisho Challenge Open; Tsukuba, Ibaraki, Japan; Hard $25,000; Singles – Doubles	(Chinese Taipei) Chan Chin-wei (Chinese Taipei) Hsu Wen-hsin; 6–1, 6–1	(South Korea) Kim So-jung (Japan) Erika Takao	(Japan) Misa Eguchi (Belgium) Tamaryn Hendler	(Japan) Erika Sema (China) Wang Qiang (China) Hu Yueyue (Chinese Taipei) Hsu Wen-hsin
August 29	Sanremo, Italy; Clay $10,000; Singles draw – Doubles draw	(Italy) Carolina Pillot; 6–3, 6–3	(Italy) Stefania Chieppa	(Italy) Benedetta Davato (Italy) Federica Quercia	(Italy) Camilla Rosatello (Italy) Valentine Confalonieri (France) Amandine Hesse (Italy) Georgia Brescia
August 29	Sanremo, Italy; Clay $10,000; Singles draw – Doubles draw	(Italy) Benedetta Davato (Italy) Camilla Rosatello; 6–2, 6–4	(Italy) Francesca Gariglio (Italy) Giorgia Marchetti	(Italy) Benedetta Davato (Italy) Federica Quercia	(Italy) Camilla Rosatello (Italy) Valentine Confalonieri (France) Amandine Hesse (Italy) Georgia Brescia
August 29	Osijek, Croatia; Clay $10,000; Singles draw – Doubles draw	(Croatia) Petra Šunić; 4–6, 6–0, 6–2	(Czech Republic) Barbora Krejčíková	(Serbia) Jovana Jakšić (Bulgaria) Julia Stamatova	(Slovakia) Monika Staníková (Czech Republic) Monika Tůmová (Hungary) Vaszilisza Bulgakova (Croatia) Silvia Njirić
August 29	Osijek, Croatia; Clay $10,000; Singles draw – Doubles draw	(Czech Republic) Aneta Dvořáková (Czech Republic) Barbora Krejčíková; 7–5, 6–2	(Ukraine) Diana Bogoliy (Russia) Alena Tarasova	(Serbia) Jovana Jakšić (Bulgaria) Julia Stamatova	(Slovakia) Monika Staníková (Czech Republic) Monika Tůmová (Hungary) Vaszilisza Bulgakova (Croatia) Silvia Njirić
August 29	Apeldoorn, Netherlands; Clay $10,000; Singles draw – Doubles draw	(France) Myrtille Georges; 7–5, 6–4	(Netherlands) Lesley Kerkhove	(Belgium) Alison Van Uytvanck (Netherlands) Eva Wacanno	(Uzbekistan) Albina Khabibulina (Bosnia and Herzegovina) Sandra Martinović (China) Lu Jiajing (China) Lu Jia Xiang
August 29	Apeldoorn, Netherlands; Clay $10,000; Singles draw – Doubles draw	(Netherlands) Kim Kilsdonk (Netherlands) Nicolette van Uitert; 6–4, 6–0	(China) Lu Jia Xiang (China) Lu Jiajing	(Belgium) Alison Van Uytvanck (Netherlands) Eva Wacanno	(Uzbekistan) Albina Khabibulina (Bosnia and Herzegovina) Sandra Martinović (China) Lu Jiajing (China) Lu Jia Xiang
August 29	Trimbach, Switzerland; Clay $10,000; Singles draw – Doubles draw	(Czech Republic) Kateřina Vaňková; 6–3, 6–2	(Germany) Christina Shakovets	(Austria) Veronika Sepp (Kyrgyzstan) Bermet Duvanaeva	(Czech Republic) Kateřina Kramperová (Germany) Syna Kayser (France) Céline Cattaneo (Germany) Carolin Daniels
August 29	Trimbach, Switzerland; Clay $10,000; Singles draw – Doubles draw	(Switzerland) Xenia Knoll (Germany) Christina Shakovets; 6–3, 7–6^{(7–5)}	(Australia) Marisa Gianotti (Czech Republic) Kateřina Kramperová	(Austria) Veronika Sepp (Kyrgyzstan) Bermet Duvanaeva	(Czech Republic) Kateřina Kramperová (Germany) Syna Kayser (France) Céline Cattaneo (Germany) Carolin Daniels
August 29	Yeongwol, South Korea; Hard $10,000; Singles draw – Doubles draw	(South Korea) Yoo Mi; 6–1, 6–3	(Chinese Taipei) Lee Hua-chen	(Hong Kong) Chan Wing-yau (South Korea) Hong Seung-yeon	(Chinese Taipei) Lee Pei-chi (South Korea) Kim Sung-jung (South Korea) Kim Ji-young (South Korea) Lee Se Jin
August 29	Yeongwol, South Korea; Hard $10,000; Singles draw – Doubles draw	(South Korea) Kim Ji-young (South Korea) Yoo Mi; 6–2, 6–4	(South Korea) Kim Hae-sung (South Korea) Kim Ju-eun	(Hong Kong) Chan Wing-yau (South Korea) Hong Seung-yeon	(Chinese Taipei) Lee Pei-chi (South Korea) Kim Sung-jung (South Korea) Kim Ji-young (South Korea) Lee Se Jin
August 29	2011 Sarajevo Ladies Open; Sarajevo, Bosnia and Herzegovina; Clay $25,000; Singles – Doubles	(Croatia) Ani Mijačika; 6–1, 3–6, 6–4	(Argentina) Florencia Molinero	(Poland) Katarzyna Kawa (Montenegro) Danka Kovinić	(United States) Julia Cohen (Croatia) Tereza Mrdeža (Croatia) Maria Abramović (Italy) Nastassya Burnett
August 29	2011 Sarajevo Ladies Open; Sarajevo, Bosnia and Herzegovina; Clay $25,000; Singles – Doubles	(Croatia) Maria Abramović (Croatia) Ana Vrljić; 5–7, 7–6^{(7–3)}, [10–4]	(Portugal) Maria João Koehler (Argentina) Florencia Molinero	(Poland) Katarzyna Kawa (Montenegro) Danka Kovinić	(United States) Julia Cohen (Croatia) Tereza Mrdeža (Croatia) Maria Abramović (Italy) Nastassya Burnett

== September ==
Week of	Tournament	Winner	Runners-up	Semifinalists	Quarterfinalists
September 5	2011 Torneo Internazionale Regione Piemonte; Biella, Italy; Clay $100,000; Singles – Doubles	(Romania) Alexandra Cadanțu; 6–4, 6–3	(Colombia) Mariana Duque	(Estonia) Kaia Kanepi (Georgia (country)) Margalita Chakhnashvili	(Italy) Karin Knapp (Austria) Patricia Mayr-Achleitner (Canada) Sharon Fichman (Spain) Laura Pous Tió
September 5	2011 Torneo Internazionale Regione Piemonte; Biella, Italy; Clay $100,000; Singles – Doubles	(Spain) Lara Arruabarrena (Russia) Ekaterina Ivanova; 6–3, 0–6, [10–3]	(Slovakia) Janette Husárová (Czech Republic) Renata Voráčová	(Estonia) Kaia Kanepi (Georgia (country)) Margalita Chakhnashvili	(Italy) Karin Knapp (Austria) Patricia Mayr-Achleitner (Canada) Sharon Fichman (Spain) Laura Pous Tió
September 5	2011 Saransk Cup; Saransk, Russia; Clay $50,000; Singles – Doubles	(Russia) Alexandra Panova; 6–0, 6–2	(Russia) Marina Melnikova	(Ukraine) Veronika Kapshay (Romania) Mihaela Buzărnescu	(Russia) Anastasia Pivovarova (Russia) Victoria Kan (Russia) Valeria Solovyeva (Ukraine) Anastasiya Vasylyeva
September 5	2011 Saransk Cup; Saransk, Russia; Clay $50,000; Singles – Doubles	(Romania) Mihaela Buzărnescu (Serbia) Teodora Mirčić; 6–3, 6–1	(Czech Republic) Eva Hrdinová (Ukraine) Veronika Kapshay	(Ukraine) Veronika Kapshay (Romania) Mihaela Buzărnescu	(Russia) Anastasia Pivovarova (Russia) Victoria Kan (Russia) Valeria Solovyeva (Ukraine) Anastasiya Vasylyeva
September 5	2011 TEAN International; Alphen aan den Rijn, Netherlands; Clay $25,000; Singles – Doubles	(Liechtenstein) Stephanie Vogt; 6–2, 6–4	(Poland) Katarzyna Piter	(Netherlands) Angelique van der Meet (France) Séverine Beltrame	(Russia) Ksenia Kirillova (Venezuela) Andrea Gámiz (Germany) Carina Witthöft (Spain) Eva Fernández Brugués
September 5	2011 TEAN International; Alphen aan den Rijn, Netherlands; Clay $25,000; Singles – Doubles	(Romania) Diana Enache (Netherlands) Daniëlle Harmsen; 6–2, 6–7^{(4–7)}, [11–9]	(Poland) Katarzyna Piter (Poland) Barbara Sobaszkiewicz	(Netherlands) Angelique van der Meet (France) Séverine Beltrame	(Russia) Ksenia Kirillova (Venezuela) Andrea Gámiz (Germany) Carina Witthöft (Spain) Eva Fernández Brugués
September 5	Podgorica, Montenegro; Clay $25,000; Singles – Doubles	(Argentina) Paula Ormaechea; 6–1, 6–1	(Montenegro) Danka Kovinić	(Croatia) Maria Abramović (Argentina) Florencia Molinero	(Germany) Karolina Nowak (Latvia) Diāna Marcinkēviča (Hungary) Tímea Babos (Spain) Garbiñe Muguruza
September 5	Podgorica, Montenegro; Clay $25,000; Singles – Doubles	(Italy) Corinna Dentoni (Argentina) Florencia Molinero; 6–4, 5–7, [10–5]	(Montenegro) Danka Kovinić (Montenegro) Danica Krstajić	(Croatia) Maria Abramović (Argentina) Florencia Molinero	(Germany) Karolina Nowak (Latvia) Diāna Marcinkēviča (Hungary) Tímea Babos (Spain) Garbiñe Muguruza
September 5	Alice Springs, Australia; Hard $25,000; Singles – Doubles	(Australia) Olivia Rogowska; 7–5, 7–5	(Australia) Isabella Holland	(Australia) Sally Peers (Japan) Akiko Omae	(Israel) Keren Shlomo (Australia) Storm Sanders (United Kingdom) Melanie South (Australia) Tammi Patterson
September 5	Alice Springs, Australia; Hard $25,000; Singles – Doubles	(Brazil) Maria Fernanda Alves (United Kingdom) Samantha Murray; 3–6, 7–5, [10–3]	(Australia) Brooke Rischbieth (Australia) Storm Sanders	(Australia) Sally Peers (Japan) Akiko Omae	(Israel) Keren Shlomo (Australia) Storm Sanders (United Kingdom) Melanie South (Australia) Tammi Patterson
September 5	Noto, Ishikawa, Japan; Carpet $25,000; Singles – Doubles	(Belgium) Tamaryn Hendler; 7–6^{(7–4)}, 6–1	(Japan) Misa Eguchi	(Japan) Erika Takao (Thailand) Varatchaya Wongteanchai	(Japan) Aiko Nakamura (Japan) Ayumi Oka (Japan) Kanae Hisami (Japan) Sachie Ishizu
September 5	Noto, Ishikawa, Japan; Carpet $25,000; Singles – Doubles	(Japan) Kanae Hisami (Thailand) Varatchaya Wongteanchai; 1–6, 7–6^{(7–4)}, [14–12]	(Japan) Natsumi Hamamura (Japan) Ayumi Oka	(Japan) Erika Takao (Thailand) Varatchaya Wongteanchai	(Japan) Aiko Nakamura (Japan) Ayumi Oka (Japan) Kanae Hisami (Japan) Sachie Ishizu
September 5	Antalya, Turkey; Hard $10,000; Singles draw – Doubles draw	(United States) Chieh-yu Hsu; 6–4, 6–0	(Germany) Christina Shakovets	(Slovakia) Lucia Butkovská (Russia) Natela Dzalamidze	(Belarus) Sasha Khabibulina (Turkey) Hülya Esen (Russia) Alexandra Romanova (Romania) Ana Bogdan
September 5	Antalya, Turkey; Hard $10,000; Singles draw – Doubles draw	(Turkey) Hülya Esen (Turkey) Lütfiye Esen; 7–5, 7–5	(Portugal) Magali de Lattre (Germany) Christina Shakovets	(Slovakia) Lucia Butkovská (Russia) Natela Dzalamidze	(Belarus) Sasha Khabibulina (Turkey) Hülya Esen (Russia) Alexandra Romanova (Romania) Ana Bogdan
September 5	Madrid, Spain; Hard $10,000; Singles draw – Doubles draw	(Australia) Johanna Konta; 6–2, 6–1	(United Kingdom) Lucy Brown	(United Kingdom) Lisa Whybourn (Spain) Rocío de la Torre Sánchez	(Spain) Lucía Cervera Vázquez (Spain) Carolina Prats Millán (United Kingdom) Jade Windley (Italy) Stefania Fadabini
September 5	Madrid, Spain; Hard $10,000; Singles draw – Doubles draw	(United Kingdom) Anna Fitzpatrick (United Kingdom) Jade Windley; 0–6, 6–1, [10–8]	(Spain) Rocío de la Torre Sánchez (Spain) Georgina García Pérez	(United Kingdom) Lisa Whybourn (Spain) Rocío de la Torre Sánchez	(Spain) Lucía Cervera Vázquez (Spain) Carolina Prats Millán (United Kingdom) Jade Windley (Italy) Stefania Fadabini
September 5	Casale Monferrato, Italy; Clay $10,000; Singles draw – Doubles draw	(Peru) Bianca Botto; 6–2, 6–1	(Italy) Erika Zanchetta	(Italy) Chiara Mendo (Austria) Lisa-Maria Moser	(Italy) Giulia Pasini (France) Amandine Hesse (Czech Republic) Tereza Martincová (Netherlands) Cindy Burger
September 5	Casale Monferrato, Italy; Clay $10,000; Singles draw – Doubles draw	(Italy) Giulia Gabba (Russia) Irina Smirnova; 6–1, 6–3	(France) Morgane Pons (France) Alice Tisset	(Italy) Chiara Mendo (Austria) Lisa-Maria Moser	(Italy) Giulia Pasini (France) Amandine Hesse (Czech Republic) Tereza Martincová (Netherlands) Cindy Burger
September 5	Yeongwol, South Korea; Hard $10,000; Singles draw – Doubles draw	(Hong Kong) Venise Chan; 6–2, 6–3	(China) Yuan Yue	(South Korea) Kim Sun-jung (South Korea) Kim Ju-eun	(South Korea) Han Na-lae (South Korea) Hong Seung-yeon (South Korea) Yea Hyojung (South Korea) Hong Hyun-hui
September 5	Yeongwol, South Korea; Hard $10,000; Singles draw – Doubles draw	(South Korea) Kim Ji-young (South Korea) Kim Jin-hee; 6–1, 6–1	(Chinese Taipei) Lee Hua-chen (Chinese Taipei) Lee Pei-chi	(South Korea) Kim Sun-jung (South Korea) Kim Ju-eun	(South Korea) Han Na-lae (South Korea) Hong Seung-yeon (South Korea) Yea Hyojung (South Korea) Hong Hyun-hui
September 5	Mytilene, Greece; Hard $10,000; Singles draw – Doubles draw	(Israel) Deniz Khazaniuk; 6–4, 7–5	(Israel) Ofri Lankri	(Greece) Maria Sakkari (Spain) Nuria Párrizas Díaz	(Mexico) Ximena Hermoso (Germany) Laura Schaeder (United Kingdom) Nicola George (Spain) Beatriz Morales Hernández
September 5	Mytilene, Greece; Hard $10,000; Singles draw – Doubles draw	(Italy) Martina Caciotti (Italy) Maria Masini; 3–6, 6–0, [10–2]	(Israel) Rona Lavian (Israel) Ekaterina Tour	(Greece) Maria Sakkari (Spain) Nuria Párrizas Díaz	(Mexico) Ximena Hermoso (Germany) Laura Schaeder (United Kingdom) Nicola George (Spain) Beatriz Morales Hernández
September 12	2011 Ningbo Challenger; Ningbo, China; Hard $100,000+H; Singles – Doubles	(Belarus) Anastasiya Yakimova; 7–6^{(7–3)}, 6–3	(Japan) Erika Sema	(China) Xu Yifan (France) Stéphanie Foretz Gacon	(China) Hu Yueyue (Chinese Taipei) Chang Kai-chen (Ukraine) Tetiana Luzhanska (Japan) Aiko Nakamura
September 12	2011 Ningbo Challenger; Ningbo, China; Hard $100,000+H; Singles – Doubles	(Ukraine) Tetiana Luzhanska (China) Zheng Saisai; 6–4, 5–7, [10–4]	(Chinese Taipei) Chan Chin-wei (China) Han Xinyun	(China) Xu Yifan (France) Stéphanie Foretz Gacon	(China) Hu Yueyue (Chinese Taipei) Chang Kai-chen (Ukraine) Tetiana Luzhanska (Japan) Aiko Nakamura
September 12	2011 Allianz Cup; Sofia, Bulgaria; Clay $100,000; Singles – Doubles	(Spain) Sílvia Soler Espinosa; 2–6, 6–6, ret.	(Italy) Romina Oprandi	(Romania) Alexandra Cadanțu (France) Mathilde Johansson	(Sweden) Johanna Larsson (Colombia) Mariana Duque (France) Alizé Cornet (Romania) Andreea Mitu
September 12	2011 Allianz Cup; Sofia, Bulgaria; Clay $100,000; Singles – Doubles	(Russia) Nina Bratchikova (Croatia) Darija Jurak; 6–4, 7–5	(Romania) Alexandra Cadanțu (Romania) Ioana Raluca Olaru	(Romania) Alexandra Cadanțu (France) Mathilde Johansson	(Sweden) Johanna Larsson (Colombia) Mariana Duque (France) Alizé Cornet (Romania) Andreea Mitu
September 12	2011 Zagreb Ladies Open; Zagreb, Croatia; Clay $50,000+H; Singles – Doubles	(Bulgaria) Dia Evtimova; 6–2, 6–2	(Russia) Anastasia Pivovarova	(Netherlands) Bibiane Schoofs (Romania) Mihaela Buzărnescu	(Germany) Kristina Barrois (Hungary) Katalin Marosi (Italy) Corinna Dentoni (Croatia) Ani Mijačika
September 12	2011 Zagreb Ladies Open; Zagreb, Croatia; Clay $50,000+H; Singles – Doubles	(Portugal) Maria João Koehler (Hungary) Katalin Marosi; 6–0, 6–3	(Croatia) Maria Abramović (Romania) Mihaela Buzărnescu	(Netherlands) Bibiane Schoofs (Romania) Mihaela Buzărnescu	(Germany) Kristina Barrois (Hungary) Katalin Marosi (Italy) Corinna Dentoni (Croatia) Ani Mijačika
September 12	Mont-de-Marsan, France; Clay $25,000; Singles – Doubles	(Peru) Bianca Botto; 6–2, 6–4	(France) Laura Thorpe	(Poland) Patrycja Sanduska (Switzerland) Conny Perrin	(France) Alizé Lim (France) Céline Cattaneo (Germany) Karolina Nowak (Greece) Despina Papamichail
September 12	Mont-de-Marsan, France; Clay $25,000; Singles – Doubles	(Germany) Karolina Nowak (Switzerland) Conny Perrin; 2–6, 6–2, [10–7]	(France) Céline Cattaneo (Russia) Natalia Orlova	(Poland) Patrycja Sanduska (Switzerland) Conny Perrin	(France) Alizé Lim (France) Céline Cattaneo (Germany) Karolina Nowak (Greece) Despina Papamichail
September 12	Rotterdam, Netherlands; Clay $25,000; Singles – Doubles	(Germany) Dinah Pfizenmaier; 3–6, 6–1, 6–1	(Liechtenstein) Stephanie Vogt	(Lithuania) Lina Stančiūtė (Netherlands) Richèl Hogenkamp	(Poland) Katarzyna Piter (Romania) Cristina Dinu (Slovakia) Romana Tabak (Ukraine) Sofiya Kovalets
September 12	Rotterdam, Netherlands; Clay $25,000; Singles – Doubles	(Netherlands) Leonie Mekel (Netherlands) Anouk Tigu; 6–4, 7–5	(Brazil) Ana Clara Duarte (Brazil) Vivian Segnini	(Lithuania) Lina Stančiūtė (Netherlands) Richèl Hogenkamp	(Poland) Katarzyna Piter (Romania) Cristina Dinu (Slovakia) Romana Tabak (Ukraine) Sofiya Kovalets
September 12	Redding, California, United States; Hard $25,000; Singles – Doubles	(United States) Julia Boserup; 6–4, 2–6, 6–3	(Russia) Olga Puchkova	(Colombia) Yuliana Lizarazo (United States) Allie Will	(Italy) Camila Giorgi (United States) Yasmin Schnack (United States) Lauren Davis (Japan) Kurumi Nara
September 12	Redding, California, United States; Hard $25,000; Singles – Doubles	(United States) Maria Sanchez (United States) Yasmin Schnack; 7–6^{(7–2)}, 4–6, [10–7]	(United States) Brittany Augustine (United States) Whitney Jones	(Colombia) Yuliana Lizarazo (United States) Allie Will	(Italy) Camila Giorgi (United States) Yasmin Schnack (United States) Lauren Davis (Japan) Kurumi Nara
September 12	Cairns, Australia; Hard $25,000; Singles – Doubles	(Australia) Casey Dellacqua; 6–4, 7–6^{(7–3)}	(Poland) Sandra Zaniewska	(Indonesia) Ayu Fani Damayanti (Indonesia) Jessy Rompies	(Brazil) Maria Fernanda Alves (Australia) Isabella Holland (Australia) Azra Hadzic (Australia) Bojana Bobusic
September 12	Cairns, Australia; Hard $25,000; Singles – Doubles	(Indonesia) Ayu Fani Damayanti (Indonesia) Jessy Rompies; 6–3, 6–3	(Brazil) Maria Fernanda Alves (United Kingdom) Samantha Murray	(Indonesia) Ayu Fani Damayanti (Indonesia) Jessy Rompies	(Brazil) Maria Fernanda Alves (Australia) Isabella Holland (Australia) Azra Hadzic (Australia) Bojana Bobusic
September 12	Kyoto, Japan; Carpet $10,000; Singles draw – Doubles draw	(Japan) Kazusa Ito; 6–3, 3–6, 6–4	(Japan) Akiko Yonemura	(Japan) Aki Yamasoto (Japan) Makiho Kozawa	(Japan) Miharu Imanishi (Japan) Sakiko Shimizu (Japan) Ayumi Oka (Japan) Kanae Hisami
September 12	Kyoto, Japan; Carpet $10,000; Singles draw – Doubles draw	(Japan) Miyu Kato (Japan) Riko Sawayanagi; 6–4, 7–6^{(7–5)}	(Japan) Kazusa Ito (Japan) Tomoko Taira	(Japan) Aki Yamasoto (Japan) Makiho Kozawa	(Japan) Miharu Imanishi (Japan) Sakiko Shimizu (Japan) Ayumi Oka (Japan) Kanae Hisami
September 12	São José dos Campos, Brazil; Clay $10,000; Singles draw – Doubles draw	(Argentina) María Irigoyen; 6–0, 6–0	(Argentina) Carolina Zeballos	(Argentina) Carla Lucero (Brazil) Nathaly Kurata	(Paraguay) Isabella Robbiani (Brazil) Eduarda Piai (Argentina) Guadalupe Pérez Rojas (Brazil) Nathalia Rossi
September 12	São José dos Campos, Brazil; Clay $10,000; Singles draw – Doubles draw	(Brazil) Flávia Dechandt Araújo (Brazil) Laura Pigossi; 3–6, 7–5, [10–8]	(Argentina) María Irigoyen (Argentina) Carla Lucero	(Argentina) Carla Lucero (Brazil) Nathaly Kurata	(Paraguay) Isabella Robbiani (Brazil) Eduarda Piai (Argentina) Guadalupe Pérez Rojas (Brazil) Nathalia Rossi
September 12	Lleida, Spain; Clay $10,000; Singles draw – Doubles draw	(Switzerland) Viktorija Golubic; 6–1, 7–6^{(7–5)}	(Spain) Lucía Cervera Vázquez	(Spain) Paula Mocete Talamantes (Spain) Yvonne Cavallé Reimers	(Spain) Rocío de la Torre Sánchez (Argentina) Agustina Lepore (China) Zhang Nannan (Spain) Carolina Prats Millán
September 12	Lleida, Spain; Clay $10,000; Singles draw – Doubles draw	(Spain) Yvonne Cavallé Reimers (Spain) Isabel Rapisarda Calvo; 6–2, 7–6^{(7–5)}	(Spain) Arabela Fernández Rabener (Switzerland) Viktorija Golubic	(Spain) Paula Mocete Talamantes (Spain) Yvonne Cavallé Reimers	(Spain) Rocío de la Torre Sánchez (Argentina) Agustina Lepore (China) Zhang Nannan (Spain) Carolina Prats Millán
September 12	Antalya, Turkey; Hard $10,000; Singles draw – Doubles draw	(Czech Republic) Nikola Fraňková; 6–4, 6–3	(United Kingdom) Francesca Stephenson	(Turkey) Melis Sezer (Romania) Ana Bogdan	(Belarus) Sasha Khabibulina (United States) Chieh-yu Hsu (Russia) Natela Dzalamidze (Turkey) Başak Eraydın
September 12	Antalya, Turkey; Hard $10,000; Singles draw – Doubles draw	(Slovakia) Lucia Butkovská (United States) Chieh-yu Hsu; 6–2, 6–2	(Ukraine) Khristina Kazimova (Belarus) Sasha Khabibulina	(Turkey) Melis Sezer (Romania) Ana Bogdan	(Belarus) Sasha Khabibulina (United States) Chieh-yu Hsu (Russia) Natela Dzalamidze (Turkey) Başak Eraydın
September 12	Tbilisi, Georgia; Clay $10,000; Singles draw – Doubles draw	(Georgia (country)) Tatia Mikadze; 6–0, 6–2	(Georgia (country)) Sofia Kvatsabaia	(Russia) Polina Monova (Armenia) Ani Amiraghyan	(Ukraine) Maryna Zanevska (Ukraine) Nadiia Kolb (Germany) Alina Wessel (Russia) Mayya Katsitadze
September 12	Tbilisi, Georgia; Clay $10,000; Singles draw – Doubles draw	(Georgia (country)) Sofia Kvatsabaia (Georgia (country)) Tatia Mikadze; 6–1, 6–3	(Turkmenistan) Anastasiya Prenko (Belarus) Viktoria Yemialyanava	(Russia) Polina Monova (Armenia) Ani Amiraghyan	(Ukraine) Maryna Zanevska (Ukraine) Nadiia Kolb (Germany) Alina Wessel (Russia) Mayya Katsitadze
September 12	2011 Save Cup; Mestre, Italy; Clay $50,000; Singles – Doubles	(Germany) Mona Barthel; 7–5, 6–2	(Spain) Garbiñe Muguruza	(Czech Republic) Sandra Záhlavová (Croatia) Tereza Mrdeža	(Italy) Anna Floris (Georgia (country)) Margalita Chakhnashvili (Russia) Ekaterina Ivanova (Czech Republic) Renata Voráčová
September 12	2011 Save Cup; Mestre, Italy; Clay $50,000; Singles – Doubles	(Ukraine) Valentyna Ivakhnenko (Russia) Marina Melnikova; 6–4, 7–5	(Hungary) Tímea Babos (Poland) Magda Linette	(Czech Republic) Sandra Záhlavová (Croatia) Tereza Mrdeža	(Italy) Anna Floris (Georgia (country)) Margalita Chakhnashvili (Russia) Ekaterina Ivanova (Czech Republic) Renata Voráčová
September 12	Porto Rafti, Greece; Hard $10,000; Singles draw – Doubles draw	(Mexico) Ximena Hermoso; 4–6, 6–4, 6–2	(Israel) Ofri Lankri	(Israel) Deniz Khazaniuk (Italy) Stephanie Scimone	(Greece) Agni Stefanou (Spain) Nuria Párrizas Díaz (Italy) Martina Caciotti (Greece) Maria Sakkari
September 12	Porto Rafti, Greece; Hard $10,000; Singles draw – Doubles draw	(Poland) Natalia Siedliska (Poland) Sylwia Zagórska; 6–4, 6–0	(Poland) Veronika Domagała (Poland) Natalia Kołat	(Israel) Deniz Khazaniuk (Italy) Stephanie Scimone	(Greece) Agni Stefanou (Spain) Nuria Párrizas Díaz (Italy) Martina Caciotti (Greece) Maria Sakkari
September 19	2011 Open GDF Suez de Bretagne; Saint-Malo, France; Clay $100,000+H; Singles – Doubles	(Romania) Sorana Cîrstea; 6–2, 6–2	(Spain) Sílvia Soler Espinosa	(Switzerland) Stefanie Vögele (France) Mathilde Johansson	(Czech Republic) Lucie Hradecká (Spain) Laura Pous Tió (Netherlands) Kiki Bertens (Sweden) Johanna Larsson
September 19	2011 Open GDF Suez de Bretagne; Saint-Malo, France; Clay $100,000+H; Singles – Doubles	(Sweden) Johanna Larsson (Germany) Jasmin Wöhr; 6–4, 6–2	(Russia) Nina Bratchikova (Croatia) Darija Jurak	(Switzerland) Stefanie Vögele (France) Mathilde Johansson	(Czech Republic) Lucie Hradecká (Spain) Laura Pous Tió (Netherlands) Kiki Bertens (Sweden) Johanna Larsson
September 19	2011 Coleman Vision Tennis Championships; Albuquerque, United States; Hard $75,000; Singles – Doubles	(Russia) Regina Kulikova; 7–5, 6–3	(Georgia (country)) Anna Tatishvili	(Canada) Aleksandra Wozniak (Romania) Edina Gallovits-Hall	(United States) Lauren Davis (Italy) Camila Giorgi (Croatia) Mirjana Lučić (United States) Amanda Fink
September 19	2011 Coleman Vision Tennis Championships; Albuquerque, United States; Hard $75,000; Singles – Doubles	(United States) Alexa Glatch (United States) Asia Muhammad; 4–6, 6–3, [10–2]	(United States) Grace Min (United States) Melanie Oudin	(Canada) Aleksandra Wozniak (Romania) Edina Gallovits-Hall	(United States) Lauren Davis (Italy) Camila Giorgi (Croatia) Mirjana Lučić (United States) Amanda Fink
September 19	2011 Aegon GB Pro-Series Shrewsbury; Shrewsbury, United Kingdom; Hard $75,000; Singles – Doubles	(Germany) Mona Barthel; 6–0, 6–3	(United Kingdom) Heather Watson	(Russia) Ekaterina Bychkova (Germany) Annika Beck	(United Kingdom) Anne Keothavong (Germany) Tatjana Malek (Russia) Vitalia Diatchenko (United Kingdom) Naomi Broady
September 19	2011 Aegon GB Pro-Series Shrewsbury; Shrewsbury, United Kingdom; Hard $75,000; Singles – Doubles	(Portugal) Maria João Koehler (Hungary) Katalin Marosi; 7–6^{(7–3)}, 6–1	(United Kingdom) Amanda Elliott (Australia) Johanna Konta	(Russia) Ekaterina Bychkova (Germany) Annika Beck	(United Kingdom) Anne Keothavong (Germany) Tatjana Malek (Russia) Vitalia Diatchenko (United Kingdom) Naomi Broady
September 19	Foggia, Italy; Clay $25,000; Singles – Doubles	(Argentina) Paula Ormaechea; 6–4, 6–4	(Czech Republic) Renata Voráčová	(Spain) Leticia Costas (Netherlands) Richèl Hogenkamp	(Italy) Anna Remondina (Italy) Anna Floris (Argentina) Florencia Molinero (Lithuania) Lina Stančiūtė
September 19	Foggia, Italy; Clay $25,000; Singles – Doubles	(Slovakia) Janette Husárová (Czech Republic) Renata Voráčová; 6–1, 6–2	(Spain) Leticia Costas (Spain) Inés Ferrer Suárez	(Spain) Leticia Costas (Netherlands) Richèl Hogenkamp	(Italy) Anna Remondina (Italy) Anna Floris (Argentina) Florencia Molinero (Lithuania) Lina Stančiūtė
September 19	Darwin, Northern Territory, Australia; Hard $25,000; Singles – Doubles	(Australia) Casey Dellacqua; 6–1, 6–2	(Japan) Akiko Omae	(Australia) Olivia Rogowska (Australia) Bojana Bobusic	(Chinese Taipei) Juan Ting-fei (Turkey) Pemra Özgen (United States) Lena Litvak (Australia) Isabella Holland
September 19	Darwin, Northern Territory, Australia; Hard $25,000; Singles – Doubles	(Brazil) Maria Fernanda Alves (United Kingdom) Samantha Murray; 6–4, 6–2	(Australia) Stephanie Bengson (Australia) Tyra Calderwood	(Australia) Olivia Rogowska (Australia) Bojana Bobusic	(Chinese Taipei) Juan Ting-fei (Turkey) Pemra Özgen (United States) Lena Litvak (Australia) Isabella Holland
September 19	Adana, Turkey; Hard $10,000; Singles draw – Doubles draw	(United States) Chieh-yu Hsu; 6–0, 7–5	(Czech Republic) Nikola Fraňková	(Turkey) Hülya Esen (Turkey) Melis Sezer	(Russia) Yanina Darishina (Kazakhstan) Kamila Kerimbayeva (Ukraine) Khristina Kazimova (Russia) Julia Samuseva
September 19	Adana, Turkey; Hard $10,000; Singles draw – Doubles draw	(Czech Republic) Nikola Fraňková (United States) Chieh-yu Hsu; 7–6^{(7–4)}, 6–4	(Turkey) Hülya Esen (Turkey) Lütfiye Esen	(Turkey) Hülya Esen (Turkey) Melis Sezer	(Russia) Yanina Darishina (Kazakhstan) Kamila Kerimbayeva (Ukraine) Khristina Kazimova (Russia) Julia Samuseva
September 19	Madrid, Spain; Hard $10,000; Singles draw – Doubles draw	(Spain) Rocío de la Torre Sánchez; 4–6, 6–2, 7–5	(Italy) Julia Mayr	(Italy) Evelyn Mayr (Spain) Georgina García Pérez	(Bosnia and Herzegovina) Sandra Martinović (China) Liu Chang (United States) Rosalia Alda (Spain) Olga Sáez Larra
September 19	Madrid, Spain; Hard $10,000; Singles draw – Doubles draw	(Italy) Evelyn Mayr (Italy) Julia Mayr; 6–1, 6–4	(Spain) Rocío de la Torre Sánchez (Spain) Georgina García Pérez	(Italy) Evelyn Mayr (Spain) Georgina García Pérez	(Bosnia and Herzegovina) Sandra Martinović (China) Liu Chang (United States) Rosalia Alda (Spain) Olga Sáez Larra
September 19	Espinho, Portugal; Clay $10,000; Singles draw – Doubles draw	(France) Jessica Ginier; 7–5, 6–2	(France) Morgane Pons	(Germany) Carolin Daniels (France) Alice Tisset	(Italy) Costanza Mecchi (Spain) Sheila Solsona Carcasona (Portugal) Margarida Moura (Portugal) Bárbara Luz
September 19	Espinho, Portugal; Clay $10,000; Singles draw – Doubles draw	(Germany) Carolin Daniels (Germany) Karolina Nowak; 6–3, 6–0	(Portugal) Bárbara Luz (Spain) Sheila Solsona Carcasona	(Germany) Carolin Daniels (France) Alice Tisset	(Italy) Costanza Mecchi (Spain) Sheila Solsona Carcasona (Portugal) Margarida Moura (Portugal) Bárbara Luz
September 19	São Paulo, Brazil; Clay $10,000; Singles draw – Doubles draw	(Argentina) María Irigoyen; 6–2, 6–3	(Argentina) Carla Lucero	(Chile) Cecilia Costa Melgar (Argentina) Carolina Zeballos	(Brazil) Eduarda Piai (Brazil) Liz Tatiane Koehler Bogarin (Brazil) Nathaly Kurata (Mexico) Ana Sofía Sánchez
September 19	São Paulo, Brazil; Clay $10,000; Singles draw – Doubles draw	(Argentina) María Irigoyen (Argentina) Carla Lucero; 7–6^{(12–10)}, 6–4	(Brazil) Gabriela Cé (Brazil) Flávia Guimarães Bueno	(Chile) Cecilia Costa Melgar (Argentina) Carolina Zeballos	(Brazil) Eduarda Piai (Brazil) Liz Tatiane Koehler Bogarin (Brazil) Nathaly Kurata (Mexico) Ana Sofía Sánchez
September 19	Athens, Greece; Clay $10,000; Singles draw – Doubles draw	(Israel) Deniz Khazaniuk; 1–6, 6–3, 6–3	(Greece) Maria Sakkari	(Serbia) Marina Kachar (Poland) Sylwia Zagórska	(Greece) Agni Stefanou (Austria) Yvonne Neuwirth (Greece) Despoina Vogasari (Spain) Nuria Párrizas Díaz
September 19	Athens, Greece; Clay $10,000; Singles draw – Doubles draw	(Hungary) Vanda Lukács (Germany) Christina Shakovets; 6–3, 6–2	(Poland) Natalia Siedliska (Poland) Sylwia Zagórska	(Serbia) Marina Kachar (Poland) Sylwia Zagórska	(Greece) Agni Stefanou (Austria) Yvonne Neuwirth (Greece) Despoina Vogasari (Spain) Nuria Párrizas Díaz
September 19	Tbilisi, Georgia; Clay $25,000; Singles – Doubles	(Ukraine) Lesia Tsurenko; 7–6^{(7–3)}, 6–3	(Hungary) Réka-Luca Jani	(United States) Julia Cohen (Romania) Elena Bogdan	(Russia) Irina Khromacheva (Chile) Andrea Koch Benvenuto (Georgia (country)) Sofia Kvatsabaia (Romania) Ioana Raluca Olaru
September 19	Tbilisi, Georgia; Clay $25,000; Singles – Doubles	(Ukraine) Irina Buryachok (Hungary) Réka-Luca Jani; 7–6^{(7–3)}, 6–2	(Romania) Elena Bogdan (Chile) Andrea Koch Benvenuto	(United States) Julia Cohen (Romania) Elena Bogdan	(Russia) Irina Khromacheva (Chile) Andrea Koch Benvenuto (Georgia (country)) Sofia Kvatsabaia (Romania) Ioana Raluca Olaru
September 19	Varna, Bulgaria; Clay $10,000; Singles draw – Doubles draw	(Romania) Raluca Elena Platon; 6–0, 6–1	(Bulgaria) Dalia Zafirova	(Norway) Emma Flood (Romania) Ionela-Andreea Iova	(Bulgaria) Viktoriya Tomova (Belgium) Michaela Boev (Bulgaria) Julia Stamatova (Romania) Sabina Lupu
September 19	Varna, Bulgaria; Clay $10,000; Singles draw – Doubles draw	(Romania) Camelia Hristea (Romania) Raluca Elena Platon; 6–2, 6–3	(Czech Republic) Jana Jandová (Czech Republic) Monika Tůmová	(Norway) Emma Flood (Romania) Ionela-Andreea Iova	(Bulgaria) Viktoriya Tomova (Belgium) Michaela Boev (Bulgaria) Julia Stamatova (Romania) Sabina Lupu
September 26	2011 Lexus of Las Vegas Open; Las Vegas, United States; Hard $50,000; Singles – Doubles	(Italy) Romina Oprandi; 6–7^{(2–7)}, 6–3, 7–6^{(7–4)}	(United States) Alexa Glatch	(Japan) Kurumi Nara (Russia) Regina Kulikova	(United States) Allie Will (United States) Jamie Hampton (United States) Maria Sanchez (Georgia (country)) Anna Tatishvili
September 26	2011 Lexus of Las Vegas Open; Las Vegas, United States; Hard $50,000; Singles – Doubles	(United States) Alexa Glatch (United States) Mashona Washington; 6–4, 6–2	(United States) Varvara Lepchenko (United States) Melanie Oudin	(Japan) Kurumi Nara (Russia) Regina Kulikova	(United States) Allie Will (United States) Jamie Hampton (United States) Maria Sanchez (Georgia (country)) Anna Tatishvili
September 26	Madrid, Spain; Clay $25,000; Singles – Doubles	(Italy) Nastassya Burnett; 6–2, 6–3	(Argentina) Paula Ormaechea	(Spain) Lara Arruabarrena (Italy) Anna Remondina	(Spain) Eva Fernández Brugués (Bulgaria) Aleksandrina Naydenova (Netherlands) Richèl Hogenkamp (Argentina) Catalina Pella
September 26	Madrid, Spain; Clay $25,000; Singles – Doubles	(Spain) Rocío de la Torre Sánchez (Spain) Georgina García Pérez; 5–7, 6–4, [10–8]	(Netherlands) Kiki Bertens (Belgium) Elyne Boeykens	(Spain) Lara Arruabarrena (Italy) Anna Remondina	(Spain) Eva Fernández Brugués (Bulgaria) Aleksandrina Naydenova (Netherlands) Richèl Hogenkamp (Argentina) Catalina Pella
September 26	Clermont-Ferrand, France; Hard $25,000; Singles – Doubles	(Czech Republic) Andrea Hlaváčková; 6–4, 0–6, 7–6^{(8–6)}	(Germany) Tatjana Malek	(Australia) Johanna Konta (France) Victoria Larrière	(United Kingdom) Jade Windley (United Kingdom) Tara Moore (Bulgaria) Elitsa Kostova (United Kingdom) Anne Keothavong
September 26	Clermont-Ferrand, France; Hard $25,000; Singles – Doubles	(Bosnia and Herzegovina) Mervana Jugić-Salkić (United Kingdom) Anne Keothavong; 4–6, 6–3, [10–8]	(Russia) Ekaterina Ivanova (Russia) Ksenia Lykina	(Australia) Johanna Konta (France) Victoria Larrière	(United Kingdom) Jade Windley (United Kingdom) Tara Moore (Bulgaria) Elitsa Kostova (United Kingdom) Anne Keothavong
September 26	Antalya, Turkey; Clay $10,000; Singles draw – Doubles draw	(Czech Republic) Zuzana Zálabská; 6–1, 7–6^{(8–6)}	(Sweden) Hilda Melander	(Turkey) Hülya Esen (Romania) Bianca Hîncu	(Sweden) Matilda Hamlin (Russia) Julia Parasyuk (Croatia) Tea Faber (Hungary) Csilla Borsányi
September 26	Antalya, Turkey; Clay $10,000; Singles draw – Doubles draw	(Turkey) Hülya Esen (Turkey) Lütfiye Esen; 6–4, 6–2	(Ukraine) Khristina Kazimova (United Kingdom) Francesca Stephenson	(Turkey) Hülya Esen (Romania) Bianca Hîncu	(Sweden) Matilda Hamlin (Russia) Julia Parasyuk (Croatia) Tea Faber (Hungary) Csilla Borsányi
September 26	Amelia Island, United States; Clay $10,000; Singles draw – Doubles draw	(United States) Alexandra Kiick; 6–7^{(5–7)}, 6–2, 6–3	(United States) Chalena Scholl	(Czech Republic) Tereza Hladíková (Italy) Federica Grazioso	(United States) Taylor Townsend (United States) Kirsten Flower (United States) Sherry Li (Netherlands) Marrit Boonstra
September 26	Amelia Island, United States; Clay $10,000; Singles draw – Doubles draw	(United States) Jennifer Brady (United States) Kendal Woodard; 5–7, 6–1, [10–7]	(United States) Erin Clark (China) Wen Xin	(Czech Republic) Tereza Hladíková (Italy) Federica Grazioso	(United States) Taylor Townsend (United States) Kirsten Flower (United States) Sherry Li (Netherlands) Marrit Boonstra
September 26	Umag, Croatia; Clay $10,000; Singles draw – Doubles draw	(Croatia) Tereza Mrdeža; 7–6^{(7–2)}, 4–6, 6–2	(Slovakia) Zuzana Zlochová	(Serbia) Milana Špremo (Croatia) Dijana Banoveć	(Serbia) Natalija Kostić (Russia) Varvara Flink (Croatia) Ivana Klepić (Croatia) Karla Popović
September 26	Umag, Croatia; Clay $10,000; Singles draw – Doubles draw	(Slovakia) Lucia Butkovská (Serbia) Natalija Kostić; 7–5, 3–6, [10–6]	(Czech Republic) Martina Borecká (Czech Republic) Petra Krejsová	(Serbia) Milana Špremo (Croatia) Dijana Banoveć	(Serbia) Natalija Kostić (Russia) Varvara Flink (Croatia) Ivana Klepić (Croatia) Karla Popović
September 26	2011 Telavi Open; Telavi, Georgia; Clay $50,000; Singles – Doubles	(Russia) Alexandra Panova; 4–6, 6–1, 6–1	(Romania) Alexandra Cadanțu	(Russia) Irina Khromacheva (Georgia (country)) Margalita Chakhnashvili	(United States) Julia Cohen (Ukraine) Lesia Tsurenko (Romania) Mihaela Buzărnescu (Slovakia) Jana Čepelová
September 26	2011 Telavi Open; Telavi, Georgia; Clay $50,000; Singles – Doubles	(Romania) Elena Bogdan (Romania) Mihaela Buzărnescu; 1–6, 6–1, [10–3]	(Georgia (country)) Ekaterine Gorgodze (Italy) Anastasia Grymalska	(Russia) Irina Khromacheva (Georgia (country)) Margalita Chakhnashvili	(United States) Julia Cohen (Ukraine) Lesia Tsurenko (Romania) Mihaela Buzărnescu (Slovakia) Jana Čepelová
September 26	Jakarta, Indonesia; Hard $25,000; Singles – Doubles	(Belgium) Tamaryn Hendler; 5–7, 6–4, 6–3	(South Africa) Chanel Simmonds	(France) Iryna Brémond (Indonesia) Ayu Fani Damayanti	(Thailand) Luksika Kumkhum (Thailand) Nudnida Luangnam (China) Zhao Yijing (Thailand) Varatchaya Wongteanchai
September 26	Jakarta, Indonesia; Hard $25,000; Singles – Doubles	(Thailand) Nicha Lertpitaksinchai (Thailand) Nungnadda Wannasuk; 6–4, 6–4	(Chinese Taipei) Kao Shao-yuan (China) Zhao Yijing	(France) Iryna Brémond (Indonesia) Ayu Fani Damayanti	(Thailand) Luksika Kumkhum (Thailand) Nudnida Luangnam (China) Zhao Yijing (Thailand) Varatchaya Wongteanchai
September 26	Plovdiv, Bulgaria; Clay $10,000; Singles draw – Doubles draw	(Germany) Dinah Pfizenmaier; 6–4, 6–4	(Serbia) Jovana Jakšić	(Latvia) Diāna Marcinkēviča (Norway) Ulrikke Eikeri	(Romania) Raluca Elena Platon (Bulgaria) Viktoriya Tomova (Norway) Emma Flood (Belgium) Michaela Boev
September 26	Plovdiv, Bulgaria; Clay $10,000; Singles draw – Doubles draw	(Germany) Dinah Pfizenmaier (Germany) Julia Wachaczyk; 6–4, 7–5	(Switzerland) Clelia Melena (Italy) Stefania Rubini	(Latvia) Diāna Marcinkēviča (Norway) Ulrikke Eikeri	(Romania) Raluca Elena Platon (Bulgaria) Viktoriya Tomova (Norway) Emma Flood (Belgium) Michaela Boev

== See also ==
- 2011 ITF Women's Circuit
- 2011 ITF Women's Circuit (January–March)
- 2011 ITF Women's Circuit (April–June)
- 2011 ITF Women's Circuit (October–December)
- 2011 WTA Tour
