= Irina Smirnova =

Irina Smirnova may refer to:

- Irina Smirnova (boxer), Belarusian boxer in 2002 Women's World Amateur Boxing Championships
- Irina Ilchenko, Soviet / Russian volleyball player born in 1968
- Irina Smirnova (politician), Kazakhstan politician born in 1960
- Irina Smirnova (volleyball), Russian volleyball player born in 1990
- Irina Smirnova (tennis), female Russian tennis player (1984) in 2011 ITF Women's Circuit (July–September)
