= Kirsten Flower =

American tennis player

- Country (sports): United States
- Born: August 14, 1988 (age 37)
- Plays: Right-handed
- Prize money: $6,069

Singles
- Highest ranking: No. 996 (October 10, 2011)

Doubles
- Highest ranking: No. 505 (November 21, 2011)

Kirsten Flower (born August 14, 1988) is an American former professional tennis player.

A native of Columbus, Ohio, Flower was a member of Georgia Tech's 2007 NCAA Division I championship team. Her final two seasons of collegiate tennis were with Ohio State University and she was team captain as a senior.

Flower made her only WTA Tour singles main-draw appearance as a wildcard in Cincinnati in 2007.

Flower has also worked as a coach for the Yale Bulldogs and the New Haven Chargers.

== ITF finals ==
=== Doubles (0–3) ===
Outcome	No.	Date	Tournament	Surface	Partner	Opponents	Score
Runner-up	1.	Jul 2008	ITF Evansville, United States	Hard	(United States) Courtney Dolehide	(Canada) Rebecca Marino (United States) Ellah Nze	5–7, 3–6
Runner-up	2.	Aug 2011	ITF Todi, Italy	Clay	(Australia) Stephanie Bengson	(Italy) Federica di Sarra (Italy) Angelica Moratelli	6–7, 5–7
Runner-up	3.	Aug 2011	ITF Bagnatica, Italy	Clay	(Australia) Stephanie Bengson	(Italy) Alice Balducci (Italy) Benedetta Davato	4–6, 7–6^{(8)}, [10–12]
