= 2011 ITF Roller Open – Singles =

Singles
- 2011 ITF Roller Open

Final
- Champion: (France) Mathilde Johansson
- Runner-up: (Czech Republic) Petra Cetkovská
- Score: 7–5, 6–3

Events
Singles	Doubles
← 2010 ·	ITF Roller Open	· 2012 →

Mathilde Johansson was the defending champion, and successfully defended her title, defeating Petra Cetkovská in the final, 7–5, 6–3.

== Seeds ==
1. (Czech Republic) Iveta Benešová (semifinals)
2. (Sweden) Johanna Larsson (semifinals)
3. (Czech Republic) Petra Cetkovská (final)
4. (France) Mathilde Johansson (champion)
5. (Germany) Kristina Barrois (quarterfinals)
6. (Uzbekistan) Akgul Amanmuradova (quarterfinals)
7. (Germany) Mona Barthel (second round)
8. (Czech Republic) Sandra Záhlavová (first round)

== Main draw ==
=== Key ===
- Q = Qualifier
- WC = Wild card
- LL = Lucky loser
- Alt = Alternate
- SE = Special exempt
- PR = Protected ranking
- ITF = ITF entry
- JE = Junior exempt
- w/o = Walkover
- r = Retired
- d = Defaulted
- SR = Special ranking

=== Finals ===
Semifinals
1	(Czech Republic) Iveta Benešová	6	4	6^{6}
4	(France) Mathilde Johansson	3	6	7^{8}
3	(Czech Republic) Petra Cetkovská	7	4	6
2	(Sweden) Johanna Larsson	5	6	2

Final
4	(France) Mathilde Johansson	7	6
3	(Czech Republic) Petra Cetkovská	5	3

=== Top half ===
First round
1	(Czech Republic) I Benešová	6	7
(France) I Brémond	1	5
LL	(Germany) N Geuer	6	6^{8}	5
(Liechtenstein) S Vogt	4	7^{10}	7
(Czech Republic) E Birnerová	6	7^{7}
(Germany) A-L Grönefeld	2	6^{2}
WC	(Luxembourg) C Schaul	1	0
7	(Germany) M Barthel	6	6
4	(France) M Johansson	6	6
(Japan) Y Sema	2	1
WC	(France) M Maietti	3	0
WC	(Russia) N Dzalamidze	6	6
(Austria) Y Meusburger	7	4	0
(Colombia) C Castaño	5	6	6
(Russia) R Kulikova	2	1
6	(Uzbekistan) A Amanmuradova	6	6

Second round
1	(Czech Republic) I Benešová	6	6
(Liechtenstein) S Vogt	1	2
(Czech Republic) E Birnerová	7^{7}	1	6
7	(Germany) M Barthel	6^{5}	6	3
4	(France) M Johansson	6	6
WC	(Russia) N Dzalamidze	3	0
(Colombia) C Castaño	3	4
6	(Uzbekistan) A Amanmuradova	6	6

Quarterfinals
1	(Czech Republic) I Benešová	6	1	6
(Czech Republic) E Birnerová	4	6	2
4	(France) M Johansson	7^{7}	6
6	(Uzbekistan) A Amanmuradova	6^{3}	3

Semifinals
1	(Czech Republic) I Benešová	6	4	6^{6}
4	(France) M Johansson	3	6	7^{8}

=== Bottom half ===
First round
8	(Czech Republic) S Záhlavová	2	3
Q	(Bosnia and Herzegovina) M Jugić-Salkić	6	6
SR	(Hungary) K Marosi	1	0
(Poland) M Linette	6	6
(Georgia (country)) M Chakhnashvili	6	3	6
Q	(Italy) V Vierin	3	6	2
WC	(France) F Gervais	3	1
3	(Czech Republic) P Cetkovská	6	6
5	(Germany) K Barrois	6	7^{7}
(Ukraine) Y Beygelzimer	3	6^{1}
Q	(Switzerland) C Perrin	2	6	4
(Spain) L Arruabarrena Vecino	6	3	6
Q	(Germany) S Haas	7	6
(Luxembourg) M Minella	5	0
(Germany) T Malek	3	6	3
2	(Sweden) J Larsson	6	4	6

Second round
Q	(Bosnia and Herzegovina) M Jugić-Salkić	1	6	5
(Poland) M Linette	6	3	7
(Georgia (country)) M Chakhnashvili	3	3
3	(Czech Republic) P Cetkovská	6	6
5	(Germany) K Barrois	6	6
(Spain) L Arruabarrena Vecino	4	0
Q	(Germany) S Haas	4	1
2	(Sweden) J Larsson	6	6

Quarterfinals
(Poland) M Linette	1	0
3	(Czech Republic) P Cetkovská	6	6
5	(Germany) K Barrois	2	3
2	(Sweden) J Larsson	6	6

Semifinals
3	(Czech Republic) P Cetkovská	7	4	6
2	(Sweden) J Larsson	5	6	2
