= 2011 ITF Roller Open – Doubles =

Doubles
- 2011 ITF Roller Open

Final
- Champions: (Sweden) Johanna Larsson (Germany) Jasmin Wöhr
- Runners-up: (Germany) Kristina Barrois (Germany) Anna-Lena Grönefeld
- Score: 7–6^{(7–2)}, 6–4

Events
Singles	Doubles
← 2010 ·	ITF Roller Open	· 2012 →

Sharon Fichman and Monica Niculescu were the defending champions, but both chose not to participate.

Johanna Larsson and Jasmin Wöhr defeated Kristina Barrois and Anna-Lena Grönefeld in the final 7–6^{(7–2)}, 6–4.

== Seeds ==
1. (Germany) Kristina Barrois / (Germany) Anna-Lena Grönefeld (final)
2. (Sweden) Johanna Larsson / (Germany) Jasmin Wöhr (champions)
3. (Bosnia and Herzegovina) Mervana Jugić-Salkić / (Finland) Emma Laine (semifinals)
4. (Germany) Tatjana Malek / (Austria) Yvonne Meusburger (semifinals)

== Draw ==
=== Key ===
- Q = Qualifier
- WC = Wild card
- LL = Lucky loser
- Alt = Alternate
- SE = Special exempt
- PR = Protected ranking
- ITF = ITF entry
- JE = Junior exempt
- w/o = Walkover
- r = Retired
- d = Defaulted
- SR = Special ranking

First round
1	(Germany) K Barrois (Germany) A-L Grönefeld	6	3	[10]
(Switzerland) V Golubic (Australia) K Wlodarczak	2	6	[3]
(Ukraine) Y Beygelzimer (Luxembourg) M Minella	5	6^{4}
(Russia) N Dzalamidze (Japan) C Takayama	7	7^{7}
3	(Bosnia and Herzegovina) M Jugić-Salkić (Finland) E Laine	6	6
(France) I Brémond (Poland) M Linette	4	2
(France) F Gervais (Luxembourg) C Schaul	1	0
(Czech Republic) Iveta Gerlová (Czech Republic) Lucie Kriegsmannová	6	6
(Denmark) K Barbat (Germany) S Haas	6	7
(Luxembourg) T Cornelius (France) M Maietti	1	6^{2}
(Chile) C Costa Melgar (Chile) D Seguel	3	3
4	(Germany) T Malek (Austria) Y Meusburger	6	6
(Colombia) C Castaño (Hungary) K Marosi	1	6	[10]
(Georgia (country)) M Chakhnashvili (Australia) J Moore	6	4	[7]
(Czech Republic) E Birnerová (Czech Republic) H Birnerová	1	6	[8]
2	(Sweden) J Larsson (Germany) J Wöhr	6	4	[10]

Quarterfinals
1	(Germany) K Barrois (Germany) A-L Grönefeld	6	7
(Russia) N Dzalamidze (Japan) C Takayama	4	5
3	(Bosnia and Herzegovina) M Jugić-Salkić (Finland) E Laine	6	3	[10]
(Czech Republic) I Gerlová (Czech Republic) L Kriegsmannová	4	6	[8]
(Denmark) K Barbat (Germany) S Haas	4	2
4	(Germany) T Malek (Austria) Y Meusburger	6	6
(Colombia) C Castaño (Hungary) K Marosi	4	0^{r}
2	(Sweden) J Larsson (Germany) J Wöhr	6	3

Semifinals
1	(Germany) K Barrois (Germany) A-L Grönefeld	1	6	[11]
3	(Bosnia and Herzegovina) M Jugić-Salkić (Finland) E Laine	6	4	[9]
4	(Germany) T Malek (Austria) Y Meusburger	1	3
2	(Sweden) J Larsson (Germany) J Wöhr	6	6

Finals
1	(Germany) K Barrois (Germany) A-L Grönefeld	6^{2}	4
2	(Sweden) J Larsson (Germany) J Wöhr	7^{7}	6
