= 2011 ITF Roller Open =

- Date: 18–24 July
- Edition: 11th
- Location: Pétange, Luxembourg

Champions

Singles
- (France) Mathilde Johansson

Doubles
- (Sweden) Johanna Larsson / (Germany) Jasmin Wöhr
- ITF Roller Open

The 2011 ITF Roller Open was a professional tennis tournament played on clay courts. It was the 11th edition of the tournament which was part of the 2011 ITF Women's Circuit. It took place in Pétange, Luxembourg between 18 and 24 July 2011.

== WTA entrants ==
=== Seeds ===
Country	Player	Rank^{1}	Seed
CZE	Iveta Benešová	44	1
SWE	Johanna Larsson	46	2
CZE	Petra Cetkovská	62	3
FRA	Mathilde Johansson	67	4
GER	Kristina Barrois	86	5
UZB	Akgul Amanmuradova	98	6
GER	Mona Barthel	110	7
CZE	Sandra Záhlavová	121	8

- ^{1} Rankings are as of July 11, 2011.

=== Other entrants ===
The following players received wildcards into the singles main draw:

- (Russia) Natela Dzalamidze
- (France) Fiona Gervais
- (France) Melanie Maietti
- (Luxembourg) Claudine Schaul

The following players received entry from the qualifying draw:

- (Germany) Sina Haas
- (Bosnia and Herzegovina) Mervana Jugić-Salkić
- (Switzerland) Conny Perrin
- (Italy) Vivienne Vierin

The following players received entry by a lucky loser:

- (Germany) Nicola Geuer

== Champions ==
=== Singles ===
(France) Mathilde Johansson def. (Czech Republic) Petra Cetkovská, 7–5, 6–3

=== Doubles ===
(Sweden) Johanna Larsson / (Germany) Jasmin Wöhr def. (Germany) Kristina Barrois / (Germany) Anna-Lena Grönefeld, 7–6^{(7–2)}, 6–4
