= 2010 ITF Women's Circuit (July–September) =

This is the July–September part of the 2010 ITF Women's Circuit.

== Key ==
$100,000 tournaments
$75,000 tournaments
$50,000 tournaments
$25,000 tournaments
$10,000 tournaments

== July ==
Week of	Tournament	Winner	Runners-up	Semifinalists	Quarterfinalists
July 5	2010 Open GDF Suez de Biarritz; Biarritz, France; Clay $100,000; Singles draw – Doubles draw	(Germany) Julia Görges; 6–2 6–2	(Australia) Sophie Ferguson	(France) Pauline Parmentier (Romania) Simona Halep	(Russia) Evgeniya Rodina (Spain) Laura Pous Tió (Czech Republic) Lucie Hradecká (Switzerland) Stefanie Vögele
July 5	2010 Open GDF Suez de Biarritz; Biarritz, France; Clay $100,000; Singles draw – Doubles draw	(Canada) Sharon Fichman (Germany) Julia Görges; 7–5 6–4	(Spain) Lourdes Domínguez Lino (Romania) Monica Niculescu	(France) Pauline Parmentier (Romania) Simona Halep	(Russia) Evgeniya Rodina (Spain) Laura Pous Tió (Czech Republic) Lucie Hradecká (Switzerland) Stefanie Vögele
July 5	2010 Grapevine Women's $50,000 Tennis Classic; Grapevine, Texas, United States; Hard $50,000; Singles draw – Doubles draw	(United States) Jamie Hampton; 6–3 6–4	(Japan) Kurumi Nara	(United States) Varvara Lepchenko (United States) Lindsay Lee-Waters	(Japan) Junri Namigata (United States) Irina Falconi (Ukraine) Tetiana Luzhanska (Canada) Stéphanie Dubois
July 5	2010 Grapevine Women's $50,000 Tennis Classic; Grapevine, Texas, United States; Hard $50,000; Singles draw – Doubles draw	(United States) Lindsay Lee-Waters (United States) Megan Moulton-Levy; 6–2 7–5	(United States) Kimberly Couts (Ukraine) Tetiana Luzhanska	(United States) Varvara Lepchenko (United States) Lindsay Lee-Waters	(Japan) Junri Namigata (United States) Irina Falconi (Ukraine) Tetiana Luzhanska (Canada) Stéphanie Dubois
July 5	Aschaffenburg, Germany; Clay $25,000; Singles draw – Doubles draw	(Romania) Mădălina Gojnea; 6–1 6–0	(France) Caroline Garcia	(Netherlands) Kiki Bertens (France) Irena Pavlovic	(Australia) Olivia Rogowska (Italy) Julia Mayr (Romania) Elena Bogdan (Netherlands) Elise Tamaëla
July 5	Aschaffenburg, Germany; Clay $25,000; Singles draw – Doubles draw	(Serbia) Teodora Mirčić (Japan) Erika Sema; 7–6(4) 2–6 [10–8]	(Romania) Elena Bogdan (Chile) Andrea Koch Benvenuto	(Netherlands) Kiki Bertens (France) Irena Pavlovic	(Australia) Olivia Rogowska (Italy) Julia Mayr (Romania) Elena Bogdan (Netherlands) Elise Tamaëla
July 5	Valladolid, Spain; Hard $25,000; Singles draw – Doubles draw	(Turkey) Çağla Büyükakçay; 7–6(2) 6–3	(Hong Kong) Zhang Ling	(Russia) Alexandra Panova (Greece) Eirini Georgatou	(France) Estelle Guisard (Japan) Tomoko Yonemura (Spain) Yera Campos Molina (Japan) Sachie Ishizu
July 5	Valladolid, Spain; Hard $25,000; Singles draw – Doubles draw	(Austria) Melanie Klaffner (United Kingdom) Anna Smith; 6–3 2–6 [10–7]	(Spain) Yera Campos Molina (Spain) Leticia Costas	(Russia) Alexandra Panova (Greece) Eirini Georgatou	(France) Estelle Guisard (Japan) Tomoko Yonemura (Spain) Yera Campos Molina (Japan) Sachie Ishizu
July 5	Brussels, Belgium; Clay $10,000; Singles draw – Doubles draw	(France) Constance Sibille; 6–2 6–1	(Austria) Katharina Negrin	(Russia) Elina Gasanova (Belgium) Alison Van Uytvanck	(France) Émilie Bacquet (Slovakia) Zuzana Zlochová (Netherlands) Marcella Koek (France) Andrea Ka
July 5	Brussels, Belgium; Clay $10,000; Singles draw – Doubles draw	(Russia) Vasilisa Davydova (Russia) Elina Gasanova; 7–5 6–2	(Netherlands) Marcella Koek (Netherlands) Josanne van Bennekom	(Russia) Elina Gasanova (Belgium) Alison Van Uytvanck	(France) Émilie Bacquet (Slovakia) Zuzana Zlochová (Netherlands) Marcella Koek (France) Andrea Ka
July 5	Turin, Italy; Clay $10,000; Singles draw – Doubles draw	(Italy) Gabriella Polito; 6–4 7–6(3)	(Italy) Carolina Pillot	(Italy) Alice Balducci (Italy) Elisa Balsamo	(Norway) Ulrikke Eikeri (Italy) Stefania Chieppa (Italy) Valentina Sulpizio (Switzerland) Lisa Sabino
July 5	Turin, Italy; Clay $10,000; Singles draw – Doubles draw	(Italy) Elisa Balsamo (Italy) Valentina Sulpizio; 7–5 6–3	(Italy) Alice Balducci (Italy) Martina Caciotti	(Italy) Alice Balducci (Italy) Elisa Balsamo	(Norway) Ulrikke Eikeri (Italy) Stefania Chieppa (Italy) Valentina Sulpizio (Switzerland) Lisa Sabino
July 5	Prokuplje, Serbia; Clay $10,000; Singles draw – Doubles draw	(Slovakia) Vivien Juhászová; 6–2 3–6 6–0	(Romania) Ingrid-Alexandra Radu	(Serbia) Doroteja Erić (Russia) Polina Vinogradova	(Serbia) Saška Gavrilovska (Czech Republic) Martina Kubičíková (Slovakia) Simonka Parajová (Serbia) Natalija Kostić
July 5	Prokuplje, Serbia; Clay $10,000; Singles draw – Doubles draw	(Serbia) Karolina Jovanović (Slovenia) Polona Reberšak; 3–6 6–2 [10–2]	(Slovakia) Vivien Juhászová (Czech Republic) Teresa Malíková	(Serbia) Doroteja Erić (Russia) Polina Vinogradova	(Serbia) Saška Gavrilovska (Czech Republic) Martina Kubičíková (Slovakia) Simonka Parajová (Serbia) Natalija Kostić
July 5	Tokyo, Japan; Carpet $10,000; Singles draw – Doubles draw	(Japan) Kaori Onishi; 4–6 6–4 6–1	(Japan) Mari Tanaka	(Japan) Yuuki Tanaka (Japan) Hiroko Kuwata	(Japan) Yoshimi Kawasaki (Japan) Kazusa Ito (Japan) Misa Kinoshita (Japan) Kei Sekine
July 5	Tokyo, Japan; Carpet $10,000; Singles draw – Doubles draw	(Japan) Maki Arai (Japan) Maiko Inoue; 6–2 7–5	(Japan) Airi Hagimoto (Japan) Kaori Onishi	(Japan) Yuuki Tanaka (Japan) Hiroko Kuwata	(Japan) Yoshimi Kawasaki (Japan) Kazusa Ito (Japan) Misa Kinoshita (Japan) Kei Sekine
July 5	Pattaya, Thailand; Hard $10,000; Singles draw – Doubles draw	(Japan) Shiho Akita; 6–3 6–4	(Thailand) Nudnida Luangnam	(Japan) Sakiko Shimizu (South Korea) Kim Ji-Sun	(Japan) Kanae Hisami (South Korea) Yu Min-Hwa (South Korea) Hong Hyun-Hui (Thailand) Peangtarn Plipuech
July 5	Pattaya, Thailand; Hard $10,000; Singles draw – Doubles draw	(Chinese Taipei) Chen Yi (Japan) Sakiko Shimizu; 6–3 7–6(2)	(Indonesia) Jessy Rompies (Thailand) Varatchaya Wongteanchai	(Japan) Sakiko Shimizu (South Korea) Kim Ji-Sun	(Japan) Kanae Hisami (South Korea) Yu Min-Hwa (South Korea) Hong Hyun-Hui (Thailand) Peangtarn Plipuech
July 5	Fuzhou, China; Hard $25,000; Singles draw – Doubles draw	(Chinese Taipei) Chan Yung-jan; 6–2 6–4	(South Korea) Lee Jin-a	(China) Zhou Xiao (China) Zhang Shuai	(China) Xu Yifan (Georgia (country)) Tatia Mikadze (China) Liu Shaozhuo (China) Wang Qiang
July 5	Fuzhou, China; Hard $25,000; Singles draw – Doubles draw	(China) Liu Shaozhuo (China) Xu Yifan; 3–6 6–1 [10–2]	(Chinese Taipei) Kao Shao-Yuan (Japan) Ayaka Maekawa	(China) Zhou Xiao (China) Zhang Shuai	(China) Xu Yifan (Georgia (country)) Tatia Mikadze (China) Liu Shaozhuo (China) Wang Qiang
July 12	Contrexéville, France; Clay $50,000; Singles draw – Doubles draw	(Australia) Jelena Dokić; 4–6 6–3 6–1	(France) Olivia Sanchez	(France) Laura Thorpe (Peru) Bianca Botto	(Russia) Ekaterina Ivanova (Australia) Sally Peers (France) Claire de Gubernatis (France) Claire Feuerstein
July 12	Contrexéville, France; Clay $50,000; Singles draw – Doubles draw	(Russia) Nina Bratchikova (Russia) Ekaterina Ivanova; 4–6 6–4 [10–3]	(Australia) Jelena Dokić (Canada) Sharon Fichman	(France) Laura Thorpe (Peru) Bianca Botto	(Russia) Ekaterina Ivanova (Australia) Sally Peers (France) Claire de Gubernatis (France) Claire Feuerstein
July 12	Zwevegem, Belgium; Clay $25,000; Singles draw – Doubles draw	(Ukraine) Maryna Zanevska; 7–6(4) 6–1	(Belgium) Sofie Oyen	(Russia) Irina Khromacheva (France) Anaïs Laurendon	(Netherlands) Marcella Koek (Netherlands) Daniëlle Harmsen (Slovakia) Lenka Wienerová (Switzerland) Lisa Sabino
July 12	Zwevegem, Belgium; Clay $25,000; Singles draw – Doubles draw	(Netherlands) Richèl Hogenkamp (Russia) Valeria Savinykh; 6–3 3–6 [10–7]	(Russia) Irina Khromacheva (Ukraine) Maryna Zanevska	(Russia) Irina Khromacheva (France) Anaïs Laurendon	(Netherlands) Marcella Koek (Netherlands) Daniëlle Harmsen (Slovakia) Lenka Wienerová (Switzerland) Lisa Sabino
July 12	Darmstadt, Germany; Clay $25,000; Singles draw – Doubles draw	(Russia) Vitalia Diatchenko; 6–4 5–7 6–4	(Germany) Julia Schruff	(Romania) Mădălina Gojnea (France) Mathilde Johansson	(Liechtenstein) Stephanie Vogt (Hungary) Réka-Luca Jani (Romania) Irina-Camelia Begu (Romania) Elora Dabija
July 12	Darmstadt, Germany; Clay $25,000; Singles draw – Doubles draw	(Russia) Vitalia Diatchenko (Germany) Laura Siegemund; 4–6 6–1 [10–4]	(Romania) Irina-Camelia Begu (Japan) Erika Sema	(Romania) Mădălina Gojnea (France) Mathilde Johansson	(Liechtenstein) Stephanie Vogt (Hungary) Réka-Luca Jani (Romania) Irina-Camelia Begu (Romania) Elora Dabija
July 12	Woking, United Kingdom; Hard $25,000; Singles draw – Doubles draw	(Hungary) Tímea Babos; 7–5 6–4	(United Kingdom) Katie O'Brien	(Finland) Emma Laine (Uzbekistan) Nigina Abduraimova	(Estonia) Margit Rüütel (United Kingdom) Anna Smith (Germany) Mona Barthel (United Kingdom) Laura Robson
July 12	Woking, United Kingdom; Hard $25,000; Singles draw – Doubles draw	(Hungary) Tímea Babos (Finland) Emma Laine; 6–2 6–2	(United Kingdom) Jocelyn Rae (Australia) Emelyn Starr	(Finland) Emma Laine (Uzbekistan) Nigina Abduraimova	(Estonia) Margit Rüütel (United Kingdom) Anna Smith (Germany) Mona Barthel (United Kingdom) Laura Robson
July 12	Imola, Italy; Carpet $10,000; Singles draw – Doubles draw	(Italy) Gioia Barbieri; 6–1 6–1	(Italy) Verdiana Verardi	(Belarus) Aliaksandra Sasnovich (Italy) Alice Balducci	(Austria) Veronika Sepp (Italy) Angelica Moratelli (Italy) Alice Moroni (Italy) Martina Di Giuseppe
July 12	Imola, Italy; Carpet $10,000; Singles draw – Doubles draw	(Italy) Nicole Clerico (Italy) Maria Masini; 6–4 6–1	(Italy) Gioia Barbieri (Argentina) Maria-Belen Corbalan	(Belarus) Aliaksandra Sasnovich (Italy) Alice Balducci	(Austria) Veronika Sepp (Italy) Angelica Moratelli (Italy) Alice Moroni (Italy) Martina Di Giuseppe
July 12	Prokuplje, Serbia; Clay $10,000; Singles draw – Doubles draw	(Hungary) Zsófia Susányi; 6–4 6–4	(Russia) Polina Vinogradova	(Latvia) Diāna Marcinkēviča (Serbia) Doroteja Erić	(Russia) Nadezda Gorbachkova (Slovenia) Polona Reberšak (Romania) Camelia Hristea (Bulgaria) Dessislava Mladenova
July 12	Prokuplje, Serbia; Clay $10,000; Singles draw – Doubles draw	(Romania) Camelia Hristea (Romania) Ionela-Andreea Iova; 7–5 6–4	(Slovenia) Jelena Durišič (Bulgaria) Isabella Shinikova	(Latvia) Diāna Marcinkēviča (Serbia) Doroteja Erić	(Russia) Nadezda Gorbachkova (Slovenia) Polona Reberšak (Romania) Camelia Hristea (Bulgaria) Dessislava Mladenova
July 12	Piešťany, Slovakia; Clay $10,000; Singles draw – Doubles draw	(Czech Republic) Zuzana Zálabská; 3–6 6–3 6–0	(Slovakia) Chantal Škamlová	(Czech Republic) Petra Krejsová (Slovakia) Dominika Nociarová	(Poland) Paula Kania (Slovakia) Nikola Vajdová (Slovakia) Michaela Hončová (Czech Republic) Martina Borecká
July 12	Piešťany, Slovakia; Clay $10,000; Singles draw – Doubles draw	(Poland) Veronika Domagala (Poland) Paula Kania; 6–1 6–1	(Czech Republic) Gabriela Horáčková (Czech Republic) Petra Krejsová	(Czech Republic) Petra Krejsová (Slovakia) Dominika Nociarová	(Poland) Paula Kania (Slovakia) Nikola Vajdová (Slovakia) Michaela Hončová (Czech Republic) Martina Borecká
July 12	Cáceres, Spain; Hard $10,000; Singles draw – Doubles draw	(Hong Kong) Zhang Ling; 6–3 6–0	(Spain) Rocío de la Torre Sánchez	(France) Victoria Larrière (Spain) Lucía Cervera Vázquez	(Spain) Isabel Rapisarda Calvo (Portugal) Bárbara Luz (Czech Republic) Zuzana Linhová (Spain) Silvia García Jiménez
July 12	Cáceres, Spain; Hard $10,000; Singles draw – Doubles draw	(Australia) Jade Hopper (France) Victoria Larrière; 7–5 6–4	(Spain) Georgina García Pérez (Germany) Kim Grajdek	(France) Victoria Larrière (Spain) Lucía Cervera Vázquez	(Spain) Isabel Rapisarda Calvo (Portugal) Bárbara Luz (Czech Republic) Zuzana Linhová (Spain) Silvia García Jiménez
July 12	Atlanta, United States; Hard $10,000; Singles draw – Doubles draw	(United States) Irina Falconi; 6–1 6–4	(United States) Allie Will	(Israel) Julia Glushko (United States) Madison Keys	(United States) Amanda Fink (United States) Caitlin Whoriskey (United States) Lauren MacFarlane (United States) Hilary Barte
July 12	Atlanta, United States; Hard $10,000; Singles draw – Doubles draw	(United States) Kristy Frilling (Israel) Julia Glushko; 6–2 2–6 [10–7]	(United States) Irina Falconi (United States) Maria Sanchez	(Israel) Julia Glushko (United States) Madison Keys	(United States) Amanda Fink (United States) Caitlin Whoriskey (United States) Lauren MacFarlane (United States) Hilary Barte
July 12	Casablanca, Morocco; Clay $10,000; Singles draw – Doubles draw	(Slovakia) Martina Balogová; 7–5 6–7(4) 6–4	(Morocco) Fatima El Allami	(Morocco) Lina Bennani (Russia) Anna Morgina	(Greece) Despina Papamichail (France) Alice Tisset (Germany) Syna Kayser (Portugal) Rita Esteves de Freitas
July 12	Casablanca, Morocco; Clay $10,000; Singles draw – Doubles draw	(Morocco) Lina Bennani (Netherlands) Anouk Tigu; 6–1 6–2	(Spain) Laura Apaolaza Miradevilla (Spain) Montserrat Blasco Fernández	(Morocco) Lina Bennani (Russia) Anna Morgina	(Greece) Despina Papamichail (France) Alice Tisset (Germany) Syna Kayser (Portugal) Rita Esteves de Freitas
July 12	Hatyai, Thailand; Hard $10,000; Singles draw – Doubles draw	(Indonesia) Lavinia Tananta; 6–4 3–6 6–0	(Thailand) Nudnida Luangnam	(New Zealand) Katherine Westbury (Austria) Tina Schiechtl	(Australia) Alison Bai (Russia) Natela Dzalamidze (Japan) Ayaka Maekawa (Portugal) Magali de Lattre
July 12	Hatyai, Thailand; Hard $10,000; Singles draw – Doubles draw	(India) Rushmi Chakravarthi (India) Poojashree Venkatesha; 6–3 7–6(10)	(Indonesia) Ayu Fani Damayanti (Indonesia) Lavinia Tananta	(New Zealand) Katherine Westbury (Austria) Tina Schiechtl	(Australia) Alison Bai (Russia) Natela Dzalamidze (Japan) Ayaka Maekawa (Portugal) Magali de Lattre
July 12	2010 Seguros Bolívar Open Bogotá; Bogotá, Colombia; Clay $25,000; Singles draw – Doubles draw	(Argentina) Paula Ormaechea; 7–5 6–1	(United States) Julia Cohen	(Argentina) Mailen Auroux (Bolivia) María Fernanda Álvarez Terán	(Brazil) Nathalia Rossi (United States) Lena Litvak (United States) Lauren Albanese (Venezuela) Andrea Gámiz
July 12	2010 Seguros Bolívar Open Bogotá; Bogotá, Colombia; Clay $25,000; Singles draw – Doubles draw	(Venezuela) Andrea Gámiz (Argentina) Paula Ormaechea; 5–7 6–4 [10–8]	(Argentina) Mailen Auroux (Colombia) Karen Castiblanco	(Argentina) Mailen Auroux (Bolivia) María Fernanda Álvarez Terán	(Brazil) Nathalia Rossi (United States) Lena Litvak (United States) Lauren Albanese (Venezuela) Andrea Gámiz
July 19	Pétange, Luxembourg; Clay $100,000; Singles draw – Doubles draw	(France) Mathilde Johansson; 6–3 6–3	(Romania) Monica Niculescu	(Italy) Anna Floris (Belarus) Darya Kustova	(Germany) Kristina Barrois (Russia) Ekaterina Ivanova (Czech Republic) Eva Birnerová (Romania) Elena Bogdan
July 19	Pétange, Luxembourg; Clay $100,000; Singles draw – Doubles draw	(Canada) Sharon Fichman (Romania) Monica Niculescu; 6–4 6–2	(France) Sophie Lefèvre (France) Laura Thorpe	(Italy) Anna Floris (Belarus) Darya Kustova	(Germany) Kristina Barrois (Russia) Ekaterina Ivanova (Czech Republic) Eva Birnerová (Romania) Elena Bogdan
July 19	2010 Fifth Third Bank Tennis Championships; Lexington, Kentucky, United States; Hard $50,000; Singles draw – Doubles draw	(Japan) Kurumi Nara; 6–4 6–4	(Canada) Stéphanie Dubois	(Canada) Rebecca Marino (United States) Lilia Osterloh	(United States) Alison Riske (United States) Alexandra Stevenson (United States) Asia Muhammad (Ukraine) Tetiana Luzhanska
July 19	2010 Fifth Third Bank Tennis Championships; Lexington, Kentucky, United States; Hard $50,000; Singles draw – Doubles draw	(Australia) Bojana Bobusic (United States) Christina Fusano; 6–4 6–2	(United States) Jacqueline Cako (United States) Story Tweedie-Yates	(Canada) Rebecca Marino (United States) Lilia Osterloh	(United States) Alison Riske (United States) Alexandra Stevenson (United States) Asia Muhammad (Ukraine) Tetiana Luzhanska
July 19	Waterloo, Ontario, Canada; Clay $25,000; Singles draw – Doubles draw	(United States) Julia Cohen; 1–6 7–5 7–5	(Oman) Fatma Al-Nabhani	(Canada) Eugenie Bouchard (United States) Lauren Albanese	(Canada) Ekaterina Shulaeva (Australia) Tiffany Welford (United States) Danielle Mills (Canada) Elisabeth Abanda
July 19	Waterloo, Ontario, Canada; Clay $25,000; Singles draw – Doubles draw	(Canada) Elisabeth Abanda (Canada) Katarena Paliivets; Walkover	(United States) Lauren Albanese (United States) Chieh-Yu Hsu	(Canada) Eugenie Bouchard (United States) Lauren Albanese	(Canada) Ekaterina Shulaeva (Australia) Tiffany Welford (United States) Danielle Mills (Canada) Elisabeth Abanda
July 19	Les Contamines-Montjoie, France; Hard $25,000; Singles draw – Doubles draw	(Czech Republic) Andrea Hlaváčková; 7–5 0–6 6–4	(Bulgaria) Elitsa Kostova	(Australia) Jessica Moore (Italy) Giulia Gatto-Monticone	(Italy) Gioia Barbieri (Canada) Sonja Molnar (Lithuania) Lina Stančiūtė (France) Audrey Bergot
July 19	Les Contamines-Montjoie, France; Hard $25,000; Singles draw – Doubles draw	(Italy) Giulia Gatto-Monticone (Italy) Federica Quercia; 7–5 7–5	(France) Claire Feuerstein (France) Constance Sibille	(Australia) Jessica Moore (Italy) Giulia Gatto-Monticone	(Italy) Gioia Barbieri (Canada) Sonja Molnar (Lithuania) Lina Stančiūtė (France) Audrey Bergot
July 19	Wrexham, United Kingdom; Hard $25,000; Singles draw – Doubles draw	(United Kingdom) Heather Watson; 6–2 6–4	(India) Sania Mirza	(Finland) Emma Laine (United Kingdom) Lisa Whybourn	(Australia) Tammi Patterson (Australia) Olivia Rogowska (United Kingdom) Naomi Broady (United Kingdom) Tara Moore
July 19	Wrexham, United Kingdom; Hard $25,000; Singles draw – Doubles draw	(United Kingdom) Tara Moore (United Kingdom) Francesca Stephenson; 2–6 6–3 [13–11]	(Finland) Emma Laine (India) Sania Mirza	(Finland) Emma Laine (United Kingdom) Lisa Whybourn	(Australia) Tammi Patterson (Australia) Olivia Rogowska (United Kingdom) Naomi Broady (United Kingdom) Tara Moore
July 19	La Coruña, Spain; Hard $25,000; Singles draw – Doubles draw	(Spain) Leticia Costas; 1–6 6–4 6–3	(Spain) María Teresa Torró Flor	(Germany) Justine Ozga (Russia) Nanuli Pipiya	(Japan) Miyabi Inoue (Spain) Inés Ferrer Suárez (Hong Kong) Zhang Ling (Spain) Isabel Rapisarda Calvo
July 19	La Coruña, Spain; Hard $25,000; Singles draw – Doubles draw	(Australia) Jade Hopper (France) Victoria Larrière; 7–6(6) 6–1	(Spain) Leticia Costas (Spain) Inés Ferrer Suárez	(Germany) Justine Ozga (Russia) Nanuli Pipiya	(Japan) Miyabi Inoue (Spain) Inés Ferrer Suárez (Hong Kong) Zhang Ling (Spain) Isabel Rapisarda Calvo
July 19	Kharkiv, Ukraine; Clay $25,000; Singles draw – Doubles draw	(Georgia (country)) Tatia Mikadze; 6–7(5) 6–2 6–4	(Russia) Natalia Ryzhonkova	(Russia) Yuliya Kalabina (Russia) Anna Arina Marenko	(France) Alizé Lim (Ukraine) Elina Svitolina (Russia) Maria Zharkova (Russia) Tamara Bizhukova
July 19	Kharkiv, Ukraine; Clay $25,000; Singles draw – Doubles draw	(Ukraine) Kateryna Kozlova (Ukraine) Elina Svitolina; 6–3 7–5	(Ukraine) Valentyna Ivakhnenko (Ukraine) Alyona Sotnikova	(Russia) Yuliya Kalabina (Russia) Anna Arina Marenko	(France) Alizé Lim (Ukraine) Elina Svitolina (Russia) Maria Zharkova (Russia) Tamara Bizhukova
July 19	Knokke, Belgium; Clay $10,000; Singles draw – Doubles draw	(Netherlands) Angelique van der Meet; 6–2 6–0	(Belgium) Sofie Oyen	(Italy) Carolina Pillot (Netherlands) Cindy Burger	(France) Céline Ghesquière (France) Myrtille Georges (Germany) Sabrina Baumgarten (Russia) Valeria Solovyeva
July 19	Knokke, Belgium; Clay $10,000; Singles draw – Doubles draw	(Netherlands) Bernice van de Velde (Netherlands) Angelique van der Meet; 6–1 6–3	(Belgium) Elyne Boeykens (Belgium) Nicky Van Dyck	(Italy) Carolina Pillot (Netherlands) Cindy Burger	(France) Céline Ghesquière (France) Myrtille Georges (Germany) Sabrina Baumgarten (Russia) Valeria Solovyeva
July 19	Horb, Germany; Clay $10,000; Singles draw – Doubles draw	(Slovakia) Michaela Hončová; 6–4 6–2	(Italy) Annalisa Bona	(Romania) Patricia Chirea (Germany) Korina Perkovic	(Serbia) Barbara Bonić (Russia) Inna Kuzmenko (Czech Republic) Jana Jandová (Ukraine) Katerina Avdiyenko
July 19	Horb, Germany; Clay $10,000; Singles draw – Doubles draw	(Czech Republic) Simona Dobrá (Czech Republic) Lucie Kriegsmannová; 4–6 7–6(5) [10–8]	(Germany) Korina Perkovic (Germany) Anna Zaja	(Romania) Patricia Chirea (Germany) Korina Perkovic	(Serbia) Barbara Bonić (Russia) Inna Kuzmenko (Czech Republic) Jana Jandová (Ukraine) Katerina Avdiyenko
July 19	Bucharest, Romania; Clay $10,000; Singles draw – Doubles draw	(Romania) Andreea Mitu; 7–5 7–5	(Romania) Elora Dabija	(Romania) Camelia Hristea (Romania) Diana Enache	(Romania) Alexandra Damaschin (Switzerland) Lisa Sabino (Romania) Ingrid-Alexandra Radu (Romania) Claudia Enache
July 19	Bucharest, Romania; Clay $10,000; Singles draw – Doubles draw	(Romania) Diana Enache (Romania) Andreea Mitu; 6–3 6–1	(Bulgaria) Dessislava Mladenova (Bulgaria) Dalia Zafirova	(Romania) Camelia Hristea (Romania) Diana Enache	(Romania) Alexandra Damaschin (Switzerland) Lisa Sabino (Romania) Ingrid-Alexandra Radu (Romania) Claudia Enache
July 19	Casablanca, Morocco; Clay $10,000; Singles draw – Doubles draw	(Tunisia) Ons Jabeur; 7–5 6–3	(Russia) Anna Morgina	(France) Jennifer Migan (Switzerland) Samira Giger	(Morocco) Fatima El Allami (Russia) Galina Fokina (Morocco) Chaimae Roudami (Morocco) Lina Bennani
July 19	Casablanca, Morocco; Clay $10,000; Singles draw – Doubles draw	(Slovakia) Katarína Baranová (Tunisia) Ons Jabeur; 6–3 6–3	(Russia) Galina Fokina (Russia) Anna Morgina	(France) Jennifer Migan (Switzerland) Samira Giger	(Morocco) Fatima El Allami (Russia) Galina Fokina (Morocco) Chaimae Roudami (Morocco) Lina Bennani
July 19	Brasília, Brazil; Hard $10,000; Singles draw – Doubles draw	(Argentina) Paula Ormaechea; 3–6 7–6(1) 7–6(6)	(Brazil) Ana Clara Duarte	(Brazil) Fernanda Hermenegildo (Brazil) Roxane Vaisemberg	(Brazil) Teliana Pereira (Brazil) Paula Cristina Gonçalves (Brazil) Fernanda Faria (Brazil) Monique Albuquerque
July 19	Brasília, Brazil; Hard $10,000; Singles draw – Doubles draw	(Brazil) Ana Clara Duarte (Brazil) Fernanda Hermenegildo; 6–2 6–4	(Brazil) Monique Albuquerque (Brazil) Roxane Vaisemberg	(Brazil) Fernanda Hermenegildo (Brazil) Roxane Vaisemberg	(Brazil) Teliana Pereira (Brazil) Paula Cristina Gonçalves (Brazil) Fernanda Faria (Brazil) Monique Albuquerque
July 19	La Paz, Bolivia; Clay $10,000; Singles draw – Doubles draw	(Colombia) Karen Castiblanco; 6–4 6–3	(Chile) Daniela Seguel	(Ecuador) Marie Elise Casares (Argentina) Lucía Jara-Lozano	(Colombia) Karen Ramírez Rivera (Argentina) Estefania Donnet (Brazil) Karina Souza (Chile) Camila Silva
July 19	La Paz, Bolivia; Clay $10,000; Singles draw – Doubles draw	(Colombia) Karen Castiblanco (Argentina) Estefania Donnet; 6–4 6–3	(Chile) Giannina Minieri (Chile) Camila Silva	(Ecuador) Marie Elise Casares (Argentina) Lucía Jara-Lozano	(Colombia) Karen Ramírez Rivera (Argentina) Estefania Donnet (Brazil) Karina Souza (Chile) Camila Silva
July 19	Evansville, United States; Hard $10,000; Singles draw – Doubles draw	(Venezuela) Gabriela Paz; 6–4 6–0	(United States) Chichi Scholl	(United States) Chanelle van Nguyen (United States) Madison Keys	(United States) Chloe Jones (United States) Megan Falcon (United States) Amanda McDowell (United States) Sabrina Santamaria
July 19	Evansville, United States; Hard $10,000; Singles draw – Doubles draw	(United States) Brynn Boren (United States) Sabrina Santamaria; 6–3 6–4	(Ukraine) Anastasia Kharchenko (Venezuela) Gabriela Paz	(United States) Chanelle van Nguyen (United States) Madison Keys	(United States) Chloe Jones (United States) Megan Falcon (United States) Amanda McDowell (United States) Sabrina Santamaria
July 19	Nonthaburi, Thailand; Hard $25,000; Singles draw – Doubles draw	(Thailand) Nudnida Luangnam; 2–6 7–5 6–1	(Japan) Tomoko Yonemura	(Japan) Erika Takao (Thailand) Nungnadda Wannasuk	(South Korea) Lee Ye-ra (Japan) Shuko Aoyama (India) Rushmi Chakravarthi (Japan) Rika Fujiwara
July 19	Nonthaburi, Thailand; Hard $25,000; Singles draw – Doubles draw	(Japan) Akiko Yonemura (Japan) Tomoko Yonemura; 6–2 6–4	(South Korea) Kim So-jung (Japan) Remi Tezuka	(Japan) Erika Takao (Thailand) Nungnadda Wannasuk	(South Korea) Lee Ye-ra (Japan) Shuko Aoyama (India) Rushmi Chakravarthi (Japan) Rika Fujiwara
July 26	Bucharest, Romania; Clay $75,000; Singles draw – Doubles draw	(Australia) Jelena Dokić; 3–6 6–1 7–6(3)	(Czech Republic) Zuzana Ondrášková	(Italy) Maria Elena Camerin (Spain) Lourdes Domínguez Lino	(Spain) Eva Fernández Brugués (Romania) Monica Niculescu (Romania) Andreea Mitu (Spain) Laura Pous Tió
July 26	Bucharest, Romania; Clay $75,000; Singles draw – Doubles draw	(Romania) Irina-Camelia Begu (Romania) Elena Bogdan; 6–1 6–1	(Argentina) María Irigoyen (Argentina) Florencia Molinero	(Italy) Maria Elena Camerin (Spain) Lourdes Domínguez Lino	(Spain) Eva Fernández Brugués (Romania) Monica Niculescu (Romania) Andreea Mitu (Spain) Laura Pous Tió
July 26	Bad Saulgau, Germany; Clay $25,000; Singles draw – Doubles draw	(Slovakia) Lenka Juríková; 6–4 6–2	(Netherlands) Elise Tamaëla	(Romania) Liana Ungur (Italy) Julia Mayr	(Italy) Evelyn Mayr (Spain) Eloisa Compostizo de Andrés (Germany) Tanja Ostertag (Italy) Corinna Dentoni
July 26	Bad Saulgau, Germany; Clay $25,000; Singles draw – Doubles draw	(Netherlands) Elise Tamaëla (Germany) Scarlett Werner; 6–1 4–6 [10–7]	(Serbia) Ana Jovanović (Germany) Anna Zaja	(Romania) Liana Ungur (Italy) Julia Mayr	(Italy) Evelyn Mayr (Spain) Eloisa Compostizo de Andrés (Germany) Tanja Ostertag (Italy) Corinna Dentoni
July 26	Vigo, Spain; Hard $25,000; Singles draw – Doubles draw	(Czech Republic) Andrea Hlaváčková; 6–2 6–0	(United Kingdom) Katie O'Brien	(Hong Kong) Zhang Ling (Italy) Claudia Giovine	(Peru) Bianca Botto (United Kingdom) Anna Smith (France) Anaïs Laurendon (Italy) Giulia Gatto-Monticone
July 26	Vigo, Spain; Hard $25,000; Singles draw – Doubles draw	(France) Anaïs Laurendon (United Kingdom) Anna Smith; 6–3 6–1	(Georgia (country)) Sofia Kvatsabaia (Germany) Justine Ozga	(Hong Kong) Zhang Ling (Italy) Claudia Giovine	(Peru) Bianca Botto (United Kingdom) Anna Smith (France) Anaïs Laurendon (Italy) Giulia Gatto-Monticone
July 26	Campos do Jordão, Brazil; Hard $25,000; Singles draw – Doubles draw	(Argentina) Aranza Salut; 2–6 7–5 6–3	(Bolivia) María Fernanda Álvarez Terán	(South Africa) Chanel Simmonds (Argentina) Mailen Auroux	(Brazil) Nathaly Kurata (Brazil) Ana Clara Duarte (Argentina) Paula Ormaechea (Paraguay) Isabella Robbiani
July 26	Campos do Jordão, Brazil; Hard $25,000; Singles draw – Doubles draw	(Brazil) Fernanda Faria (Brazil) Paula Cristina Gonçalves; 6–3 6–2	(Brazil) Monique Albuquerque (Brazil) Roxane Vaisemberg	(South Africa) Chanel Simmonds (Argentina) Mailen Auroux	(Brazil) Nathaly Kurata (Brazil) Ana Clara Duarte (Argentina) Paula Ormaechea (Paraguay) Isabella Robbiani
July 26	Almaty, Kazakhstan; Hard $25,000; Singles draw – Doubles draw	(Netherlands) Richèl Hogenkamp; 6–2 6–3	(Georgia (country)) Sofia Shapatava	(Kazakhstan) Zarina Diyas (Russia) Daria Kuchmina	(Georgia (country)) Tatia Mikadze (Russia) Natalia Orlova (Kyrgyzstan) Ksenia Palkina (Japan) Chiaki Okadaue
July 26	Almaty, Kazakhstan; Hard $25,000; Singles draw – Doubles draw	(Uzbekistan) Albina Khabibulina (Kyrgyzstan) Ksenia Palkina; 6–4 6–4	(Ukraine) Yuliya Beygelzimer (United Kingdom) Emily Webley-Smith	(Kazakhstan) Zarina Diyas (Russia) Daria Kuchmina	(Georgia (country)) Tatia Mikadze (Russia) Natalia Orlova (Kyrgyzstan) Ksenia Palkina (Japan) Chiaki Okadaue
July 26	Saint Joseph, Missouri, United States; Hard $10,000; Singles draw – Doubles draw	(Venezuela) Gabriela Paz; 6–1 6–4	(Thailand) Noppawan Lertcheewakarn	(United States) Sanaz Marand (United States) Kyle McPhillips	(United States) Ellen Tsay (United States) Whitney Jones (Russia) Nika Kukharchuk (United States) Grace Min
July 26	Saint Joseph, Missouri, United States; Hard $10,000; Singles draw – Doubles draw	(United States) Maria Sanchez (United States) Ellen Tsay; 4–6 6–4 [10–5]	(Thailand) Noppawan Lertcheewakarn (Venezuela) Gabriela Paz	(United States) Sanaz Marand (United States) Kyle McPhillips	(United States) Ellen Tsay (United States) Whitney Jones (Russia) Nika Kukharchuk (United States) Grace Min
July 26	Bree, Belgium; Clay $10,000; Singles draw – Doubles draw	(Russia) Valeria Solovyeva; 5–7 6–4 6–3	(France) Myrtille Georges	(Netherlands) Marcella Koek (Netherlands) Sabine van der Sar	(France) Émilie Bacquet (Germany) Mara Nowak (Netherlands) Josanne van Bennekom (Belgium) Elke Lemmens
July 26	Bree, Belgium; Clay $10,000; Singles draw – Doubles draw	(Belgium) Sofie Oyen (Netherlands) Demi Schuurs; 6–0 6–1	(Netherlands) Marcella Koek (Russia) Marina Melnikova	(Netherlands) Marcella Koek (Netherlands) Sabine van der Sar	(France) Émilie Bacquet (Germany) Mara Nowak (Netherlands) Josanne van Bennekom (Belgium) Elke Lemmens
July 26	Cochabamba, Bolivia; Clay $10,000; Singles draw – Doubles draw	(Argentina) Lucía Jara-Lozano; 3–6 6–3 7–5	(Argentina) Estefania Donnet	(Colombia) Karen Castiblanco (Argentina) Guadalupe Moreno	(Colombia) Karen Ramírez Rivera (Chile) Daniela Seguel (Argentina) Sofía Luini (Peru) Ingrid Várgas Calvo
July 26	Cochabamba, Bolivia; Clay $10,000; Singles draw – Doubles draw	(Chile) Giannina Minieri (Chile) Camila Silva; 6–4 6–1	(Colombia) Karen Castiblanco (Argentina) Estefania Donnet	(Colombia) Karen Castiblanco (Argentina) Guadalupe Moreno	(Colombia) Karen Ramírez Rivera (Chile) Daniela Seguel (Argentina) Sofía Luini (Peru) Ingrid Várgas Calvo
July 26	Rabat, Morocco; Clay $10,000; Singles draw – Doubles draw	(Russia) Anastasia Mukhametova; 6–2 6–0	(Greece) Despina Papamichail	(Morocco) Fatima El Allami (France) Alice Tisset	(Spain) Olga Sáez Larra (Russia) Galina Fokina (Morocco) Lina Bennani (Russia) Daria Salnikova
July 26	Rabat, Morocco; Clay $10,000; Singles draw – Doubles draw	(Russia) Anastasia Mukhametova (Russia) Ekaterina Nikitina; 6–3 5–7 [10–3]	(France) Anne-Valérie Evain (Spain) Shelia Solsona Carcasona	(Morocco) Fatima El Allami (France) Alice Tisset	(Spain) Olga Sáez Larra (Russia) Galina Fokina (Morocco) Lina Bennani (Russia) Daria Salnikova
July 26	Tampere, Finland; Clay $10,000; Singles draw – Doubles draw	(France) Alizé Lim; 6–4 6–3	(France) Amandine Hesse	(Germany) Lena-Marie Hofmann (Latvia) Diāna Marcinkēviča	(Latvia) Irina Kuzmina (Czech Republic) Monika Tůmová (Germany) Katharina Holert (Finland) Piia Suomalainen
July 26	Tampere, Finland; Clay $10,000; Singles draw – Doubles draw	(Latvia) Irina Kuzmina (Latvia) Diāna Marcinkēviča; 6–4 6–2	(France) Amandine Hesse (Czech Republic) Monika Tůmová	(Germany) Lena-Marie Hofmann (Latvia) Diāna Marcinkēviča	(Latvia) Irina Kuzmina (Czech Republic) Monika Tůmová (Germany) Katharina Holert (Finland) Piia Suomalainen
July 26	Palić, Serbia; Clay $10,000; Singles draw – Doubles draw	(Slovakia) Zuzana Zlochová; 6–1 Retired	(Bulgaria) Martina Gledacheva	(Serbia) Dunja Sukić (Hungary) Zsófia Susányi	(Romania) Claudia Enache (Slovenia) Polona Reberšak (Slovakia) Viktória Maľová (Slovakia) Veronika Zateková
July 26	Palić, Serbia; Clay $10,000; Singles draw – Doubles draw	(Bosnia and Herzegovina) Jasmina Kajtazovič (Slovakia) Zuzana Zlochová; 6–1 4–6 [10–7]	(Bulgaria) Martina Gledacheva (Italy) Francesca Mazzali	(Serbia) Dunja Sukić (Hungary) Zsófia Susányi	(Romania) Claudia Enache (Slovenia) Polona Reberšak (Slovakia) Viktória Maľová (Slovakia) Veronika Zateková
July 26	Chiswick, United Kingdom; Hard $10,000; Singles draw – Doubles draw	(United Kingdom) Tara Moore; 6–3 6–4	(Republic of Ireland) Amy Bowtell	(Australia) Tammi Patterson (United Kingdom) Jocelyn Rae	(Denmark) Malou Ejdesgaard (France) Océane Adam (France) Irina Ramialison (United Kingdom) Claire Ricketts
July 26	Chiswick, United Kingdom; Hard $10,000; Singles draw – Doubles draw	(United Kingdom) Jocelyn Rae (Australia) Emelyn Starr; 6–1 6–4	(United Kingdom) Anna Fitzpatrick (United Kingdom) Jade Windley	(Australia) Tammi Patterson (United Kingdom) Jocelyn Rae	(Denmark) Malou Ejdesgaard (France) Océane Adam (France) Irina Ramialison (United Kingdom) Claire Ricketts
July 26	Gardone Val Trompia, Italy; Clay $10,000; Singles draw – Doubles draw	(Italy) Anastasia Grymalska; 6–0 6–2	(Italy) Paola Cigiu	(Italy) Chiara Mendo (Italy) Alice Moroni	(Italy) Alice Balducci (Italy) Carolina Pillot (Italy) Alexia Virgili (Italy) Gioia Barbieri
July 26	Gardone Val Trompia, Italy; Clay $10,000; Singles draw – Doubles draw	(Italy) Gioia Barbieri (Italy) Anastasia Grymalska; 6–2 6–2	(Bulgaria) Julia Stamatova (France) Stéphanie Vongsouthi	(Italy) Chiara Mendo (Italy) Alice Moroni	(Italy) Alice Balducci (Italy) Carolina Pillot (Italy) Alexia Virgili (Italy) Gioia Barbieri
July 26	Jakarta, Indonesia; Hard $10,000; Singles draw – Doubles draw	(Austria) Tina Schiechtl; 6–3 6–4	(Indonesia) Lavinia Tananta	(Indonesia) Jessy Rompies (Belgium) An-Sophie Mestach	(Indonesia) Sandy Gumulya (India) Poojashree Venkatesha (Japan) Yuka Higuchi (China) Liu Shaozhuo
July 26	Jakarta, Indonesia; Hard $10,000; Singles draw – Doubles draw	(Indonesia) Jessy Rompies (India) Poojashree Venkatesha; 6–2 7–5	(Japan) Yumi Miyazaki (Japan) Tomoko Taira	(Indonesia) Jessy Rompies (Belgium) An-Sophie Mestach	(Indonesia) Sandy Gumulya (India) Poojashree Venkatesha (Japan) Yuka Higuchi (China) Liu Shaozhuo

== August ==
Week of	Tournament	Winner	Runners-up	Semifinalists	Quarterfinalists
August 2	2010 Odlum Brown Vancouver Open; Vancouver, Canada; Hard $75,000; Singles draw – Doubles draw	(Australia) Jelena Dokić; 6–1 6–4	(France) Virginie Razzano	(United States) Christina McHale (United States) Irina Falconi	(United States) Gail Brodsky (United States) Lilia Osterloh (United States) Shelby Rogers (Canada) Stéphanie Dubois
August 2	2010 Odlum Brown Vancouver Open; Vancouver, Canada; Hard $75,000; Singles draw – Doubles draw	(Chinese Taipei) Chang Kai-chen (Canada) Heidi El Tabakh; 3–6 6–3 [10–4]	(United States) Irina Falconi (United States) Amanda Fink	(United States) Christina McHale (United States) Irina Falconi	(United States) Gail Brodsky (United States) Lilia Osterloh (United States) Shelby Rogers (Canada) Stéphanie Dubois
August 2	2010 Beijing International Challenger; Beijing, China; Hard $75,000+H; Singles draw – Doubles draw	(Japan) Junri Namigata; 7–6(3) 6–3	(China) Zhang Shuai	(South Korea) Lee Jin-a (China) Han Xinyun	(China) Lu Jing-jing (China) Duan Yingying (South Korea) Kim So-jung (Japan) Rika Fujiwara
August 2	2010 Beijing International Challenger; Beijing, China; Hard $75,000+H; Singles draw – Doubles draw	(China) Sun Sheng-Nan (China) Zhang Shuai; 4–6 6–2 [10–5]	(China) Ji Chun-Mei (China) Liu Wan-Ting	(South Korea) Lee Jin-a (China) Han Xinyun	(China) Lu Jing-jing (China) Duan Yingying (South Korea) Kim So-jung (Japan) Rika Fujiwara
August 2	Astana, Kazakhstan; Hard $50,000; Singles draw – Doubles draw	(Russia) Evgeniya Rodina; 4–6 6–1 6–4	(Belarus) Ekaterina Dzehalevich	(Russia) Alexandra Panova (Russia) Vesna Manasieva	(Netherlands) Richèl Hogenkamp (Georgia (country)) Oksana Kalashnikova (Kazakhstan) Zarina Diyas (Russia) Ekaterina Ivanova
August 2	Astana, Kazakhstan; Hard $50,000; Singles draw – Doubles draw	(Russia) Nina Bratchikova (Russia) Ekaterina Ivanova; 6–4 6–4	(Ukraine) Yuliana Fedak (Ukraine) Anastasiya Vasylyeva	(Russia) Alexandra Panova (Russia) Vesna Manasieva	(Netherlands) Richèl Hogenkamp (Georgia (country)) Oksana Kalashnikova (Kazakhstan) Zarina Diyas (Russia) Ekaterina Ivanova
August 2	Balikpapan, Indonesia; Hard $25,000; Singles draw – Doubles draw	(Thailand) Nudnida Luangnam; 6–0 3–6 6–2	(Belgium) An-Sophie Mestach	(Indonesia) Ayu Fani Damayanti (Indonesia) Lavinia Tananta	(South Korea) Lee Ye-ra (China) Liu Shaozhuo (Japan) Yuka Higuchi (Japan) Sakiko Shimizu
August 2	Balikpapan, Indonesia; Hard $25,000; Singles draw – Doubles draw	(Indonesia) Ayu Fani Damayanti (Indonesia) Lavinia Tananta; 6–4 7–5	(Chinese Taipei) Chan Hao-ching (Chinese Taipei) Kao Shao-yuan	(Indonesia) Ayu Fani Damayanti (Indonesia) Lavinia Tananta	(South Korea) Lee Ye-ra (China) Liu Shaozhuo (Japan) Yuka Higuchi (Japan) Sakiko Shimizu
August 2	Monteroni d'Arbia, Italy; Clay $25,000; Singles draw – Doubles draw	(Romania) Liana Ungur; 7–5 6–1	(Italy) Anna Floris	(Netherlands) Kiki Bertens (Romania) Elena Bogdan	(Italy) Elisa Balsamo (Italy) Giulia Gabba (Germany) Anne Schäfer (Italy) Claudia Giovine
August 2	Monteroni d'Arbia, Italy; Clay $25,000; Singles draw – Doubles draw	(Italy) Claudia Giovine (Italy) Valentina Sulpizio; 6–2 4–6 [10–5]	(Italy) Evelyn Mayr (Italy) Julia Mayr	(Netherlands) Kiki Bertens (Romania) Elena Bogdan	(Italy) Elisa Balsamo (Italy) Giulia Gabba (Germany) Anne Schäfer (Italy) Claudia Giovine
August 2	Moscow, Russia; Clay $25,000; Singles draw – Doubles draw	(Russia) Ekaterina Bychkova; 6–2 7–5	(Belarus) Darya Kustova	(Russia) Yana Koroleva (Russia) Yuliya Kalabina	(Russia) Valeria Solovieva (Ukraine) Oksana Lyubtsova (Russia) Arina Rodionova (Russia) Anna Arina Marenko
August 2	Moscow, Russia; Clay $25,000; Singles draw – Doubles draw	(Russia) Nadejda Guskova (Russia) Valeria Solovieva; 7–6(5) 6–3	(Serbia) Teodora Mirčić (Australia) Marija Mirkovic	(Russia) Yana Koroleva (Russia) Yuliya Kalabina	(Russia) Valeria Solovieva (Ukraine) Oksana Lyubtsova (Russia) Arina Rodionova (Russia) Anna Arina Marenko
August 2	Rebecq, Belgium; Clay $10,000; Singles draw – Doubles draw	(Belgium) Sofie Oyen; 4–6 7–6(5) 6–2	(Italy) Annalisa Bona	(France) Irina Ramialison (France) Alix Collombon	(France) Jessica Ginier (France) Myrtille Georges (Belgium) Anouk Delefortrie (Netherlands) Josanne van Bennekom
August 2	Rebecq, Belgium; Clay $10,000; Singles draw – Doubles draw	(France) Émilie Bacquet (France) Myrtille Georges; 6–3 4–6 [11–9]	(Netherlands) Kika Hogendoorn (Belgium) Elke Lemmens	(France) Irina Ramialison (France) Alix Collombon	(France) Jessica Ginier (France) Myrtille Georges (Belgium) Anouk Delefortrie (Netherlands) Josanne van Bennekom
August 2	Vienna, Austria; Clay $10,000; Singles draw – Doubles draw	(Czech Republic) Lucie Kriegsmannová; 6–3 6–1	(Czech Republic) Zuzana Zálabská	(Czech Republic) Iveta Gerlová (Germany) Sabrina Baumgarten	(Czech Republic) Pavla Šmídová (Slovakia) Karin Morgosová (Austria) Barbara Haas (Austria) Veronika Sepp
August 2	Vienna, Austria; Clay $10,000; Singles draw – Doubles draw	(Czech Republic) Iveta Gerlová (Czech Republic) Lucie Kriegsmannová; 7–5 6–3	(Czech Republic) Pavla Šmídová (Czech Republic) Zuzana Zálabská	(Czech Republic) Iveta Gerlová (Germany) Sabrina Baumgarten	(Czech Republic) Pavla Šmídová (Slovakia) Karin Morgosová (Austria) Barbara Haas (Austria) Veronika Sepp
August 2	Savitaipale, Finland; Clay $10,000; Singles draw – Doubles draw	(Norway) Ulrikke Eikeri; 7–5 6–4	(Finland) Piia Suomalainen	(Germany) Syna Kayser (Czech Republic) Monika Tůmová	(Russia) Alexandra Artamonova (Spain) Sheila Solsona-Carcasona (Latvia) Zane Zarina (Latvia) Diāna Marcinkēviča
August 2	Savitaipale, Finland; Clay $10,000; Singles draw – Doubles draw	(Russia) Alexandra Artamonova (Latvia) Diāna Marcinkēviča; 6–2 6–3	(Norway) Nina Munch-Søgaard (Finland) Katariina Tuohimaa	(Germany) Syna Kayser (Czech Republic) Monika Tůmová	(Russia) Alexandra Artamonova (Spain) Sheila Solsona-Carcasona (Latvia) Zane Zarina (Latvia) Diāna Marcinkēviča
August 2	Iława, Poland; Clay $10,000; Singles draw – Doubles draw	(Czech Republic) Zuzana Zlochová; 7–6(2) 5–7 6–2	(Poland) Katarzyna Kawa	(Poland) Olga Brózda (Czech Republic) Martina Kubičíková	(Italy) Giulia Gasparri (Montenegro) Danka Kovinić (Poland) Barbara Sobaskiewicz (Poland) Veronika Domagala
August 2	Iława, Poland; Clay $10,000; Singles draw – Doubles draw	(Czech Republic) Martina Borecká (Czech Republic) Martina Kubičíková; 6–3 6–1	(Poland) Veronika Domagala (Poland) Katarzyna Kawa	(Poland) Olga Brózda (Czech Republic) Martina Kubičíková	(Italy) Giulia Gasparri (Montenegro) Danka Kovinić (Poland) Barbara Sobaskiewicz (Poland) Veronika Domagala
August 2	Gaziantep, Turkey; Hard $10,000; Singles draw – Doubles draw	(Turkey) Pemra Özgen; 6–4 6–4	(Australia) Jade Hopper	(Turkey) Başak Eraydın (Portugal) Magali de Lattre	(Poland) Sandra Zaniewska (Oman) Fatma Al-Nabhani (Australia) Daniela Scivetti (Bulgaria) Isabella Shinikova
August 2	Gaziantep, Turkey; Hard $10,000; Singles draw – Doubles draw	(Oman) Fatma Al-Nabhani (Portugal) Magali de Lattre; 6–3 6–2	(Australia) Jade Hopper (Australia) Daniela Scivetti	(Turkey) Başak Eraydın (Portugal) Magali de Lattre	(Poland) Sandra Zaniewska (Oman) Fatma Al-Nabhani (Australia) Daniela Scivetti (Bulgaria) Isabella Shinikova
August 2	São Paulo, Brazil; Clay $10,000; Singles draw – Doubles draw	(South Africa) Chanel Simmonds; 6–2 3–6 6–1	(Brazil) Roxane Vaisemberg	(Brazil) Fernanda Hermenegildo (Brazil) Nathalia Rossi	(Brazil) Paula Cristina Gonçalves (Sweden) Kristina Andlovic (Austria) Nicole Rottmann (Brazil) Fernanda Faria
August 2	São Paulo, Brazil; Clay $10,000; Singles draw – Doubles draw	(Brazil) Monique Albuquerque (Brazil) Fernanda Hermenegildo; 7–6(5) 6–4	(Brazil) Fernanda Faria (Brazil) Paula Cristina Gonçalves	(Brazil) Fernanda Hermenegildo (Brazil) Nathalia Rossi	(Brazil) Paula Cristina Gonçalves (Sweden) Kristina Andlovic (Austria) Nicole Rottmann (Brazil) Fernanda Faria
August 2	Niigata, Japan; Carpet $10,000; Singles draw – Doubles draw	(Japan) Aki Yamasoto; 6–4 6–7(3) 7–5	(Japan) Yurina Koshino	(Japan) Yuuki Tanaka (Japan) Kaori Onishi	(Japan) Kei Sekine (Japan) Mari Tanaka (Japan) Kotomi Takahata (Japan) Kanae Hisami
August 2	Niigata, Japan; Carpet $10,000; Singles draw – Doubles draw	(Japan) Akari Inoue (Japan) Kotomi Takahata; 6–1 6–4	(Japan) Miki Miyamura (Japan) Ayumi Oka	(Japan) Yuuki Tanaka (Japan) Kaori Onishi	(Japan) Kei Sekine (Japan) Mari Tanaka (Japan) Kotomi Takahata (Japan) Kanae Hisami
August 2	Santa Cruz, Bolivia; Clay $10,000; Singles draw – Doubles draw	(Chile) Camila Silva; 6–1 4–6 6–1	(Bolivia) María Fernanda Álvarez Terán	(Israel) Deniz Khazaniuk (Argentina) Tatiana Búa	(Argentina) Luciana Sarmenti (Argentina) Guadalupe Pérez Rojas (Argentina) Sofía Luini (Argentina) Guadalupe Moreno
August 2	Santa Cruz, Bolivia; Clay $10,000; Singles draw – Doubles draw	(Colombia) Karen Castiblanco (Argentina) Estefania Donnet; 2–6 6–0 [12–10]	(Argentina) Tatiana Búa (Argentina) Luciana Sarmenti	(Israel) Deniz Khazaniuk (Argentina) Tatiana Búa	(Argentina) Luciana Sarmenti (Argentina) Guadalupe Pérez Rojas (Argentina) Sofía Luini (Argentina) Guadalupe Moreno
August 2	Hechingen, Germany; Clay $25,000; Singles draw – Doubles draw	(Poland) Magda Linette; 7–5 3–6 6–2	(Spain) Silvia Soler Espinosa	(Bulgaria) Dia Evtimova (Poland) Katarzyna Piter	(Czech Republic) Eva Birnerová (Germany) Sarah Gronert (Argentina) Florencia Molinero (France) Anaïs Laurendon
August 2	Hechingen, Germany; Clay $25,000; Singles draw – Doubles draw	(Romania) Irina-Camelia Begu (France) Anaïs Laurendon; 6–2 4–6 [10–8]	(Germany) Julia Schruff (Japan) Erika Sema	(Bulgaria) Dia Evtimova (Poland) Katarzyna Piter	(Czech Republic) Eva Birnerová (Germany) Sarah Gronert (Argentina) Florencia Molinero (France) Anaïs Laurendon
August 9	Versmold, Germany; Clay $25,000; Singles draw – Doubles draw	(Poland) Magda Linette; 6–2 7–5	(Romania) Irina-Camelia Begu	(Spain) Leticia Costas (Serbia) Aleksandra Krunić	(Italy) Romina Oprandi (Germany) Nicola Geuer (Australia) Jessica Moore (Germany) Sarah Gronert
August 9	Versmold, Germany; Clay $25,000; Singles draw – Doubles draw	(Czech Republic) Hana Birnerová (Japan) Erika Sema; 6–3 6–3	(Russia) Aminat Kushkhova (Russia) Olga Panova	(Spain) Leticia Costas (Serbia) Aleksandra Krunić	(Italy) Romina Oprandi (Germany) Nicola Geuer (Australia) Jessica Moore (Germany) Sarah Gronert
August 9	Koksijde, Belgium; Clay $25,000; Singles draw – Doubles draw	(Poland) Katarzyna Piter; 6–4 6–4	(Netherlands) Kiki Bertens	(Spain) Lara Arruabarrena Vecino (Spain) Garbiñe Muguruza	(Spain) María Teresa Torró Flor (Italy) Giulia Gatto-Monticone (Italy) Martina Caregaro (Bosnia and Herzegovina) Mervana Jugić-Salkić
August 9	Koksijde, Belgium; Clay $25,000; Singles draw – Doubles draw	(Italy) Nicole Clerico (Germany) Justine Ozga; 5–7 6–4 [10–6]	(Spain) Lara Arruabarrena Vecino (Spain) María Teresa Torró Flor	(Spain) Lara Arruabarrena Vecino (Spain) Garbiñe Muguruza	(Spain) María Teresa Torró Flor (Italy) Giulia Gatto-Monticone (Italy) Martina Caregaro (Bosnia and Herzegovina) Mervana Jugić-Salkić
August 9	Trnava, Slovakia; Clay $25,000; Singles draw – Doubles draw	(Czech Republic) Sandra Záhlavová; 2–6 6–3 6–1	(Slovakia) Lenka Juríková	(Czech Republic) Zuzana Zálabská (Czech Republic) Eva Birnerová	(Croatia) Ani Mijačika (Slovakia) Michaela Pochabová (Czech Republic) Kristýna Plíšková (Romania) Mădălina Gojnea
August 9	Trnava, Slovakia; Clay $25,000; Singles draw – Doubles draw	(Czech Republic) Iveta Gerlová (Czech Republic) Lucie Kriegsmannová; 6–2 6–1	(Slovakia) Michaela Hončová (Slovakia) Lenka Wienerová	(Czech Republic) Zuzana Zálabská (Czech Republic) Eva Birnerová	(Croatia) Ani Mijačika (Slovakia) Michaela Pochabová (Czech Republic) Kristýna Plíšková (Romania) Mădălina Gojnea
August 9	Tallinn, Estonia; Hard $25,000; Singles draw – Doubles draw	(Russia) Elena Bovina; 6–4 4–1 Retired	(United Kingdom) Anne Keothavong	(Slovakia) Kristína Kučová (Finland) Emma Laine	(United Kingdom) Anna Fitzpatrick (Russia) Elena Chalova (Ukraine) Yuliya Beygelzimer (Czech Republic) Eva Hrdinová
August 9	Tallinn, Estonia; Hard $25,000; Singles draw – Doubles draw	(Finland) Emma Laine (United Kingdom) Melanie South; 6–3 6–4	(China) Lu Jing-jing (China) Sun Sheng-Nan	(Slovakia) Kristína Kučová (Finland) Emma Laine	(United Kingdom) Anna Fitzpatrick (Russia) Elena Chalova (Ukraine) Yuliya Beygelzimer (Czech Republic) Eva Hrdinová
August 9	Oneşti, Romania; Clay $10,000; Singles draw – Doubles draw	(Romania) Mihaela Buzărnescu; 6–0 6–1	(Romania) Ionela-Andreea Iova	(Romania) Laura-Ioana Andrei (Romania) Raluca Elena Platon	(Romania) Karina Goia (Romania) Alexandra Damaschin (Romania) Camelia Hristea (Slovakia) Zuzana Zlochová
August 9	Oneşti, Romania; Clay $10,000; Singles draw – Doubles draw	(Romania) Laura-Ioana Andrei (Romania) Mihaela Buzărnescu; 7–6(7) 6–2	(Romania) Camelia Hristea (Bulgaria) Biljana Pavlova	(Romania) Laura-Ioana Andrei (Romania) Raluca Elena Platon	(Romania) Karina Goia (Romania) Alexandra Damaschin (Romania) Camelia Hristea (Slovakia) Zuzana Zlochová
August 9	Istanbul, Turkey; Hard $10,000; Singles draw – Doubles draw	(Turkey) Pemra Özgen; 6–2 5–0 Retired	(Portugal) Magali de Lattre	(New Zealand) Ellen Barry (Georgia (country)) Sofia Kvatsabaia	(Oman) Fatma Al-Nabhani (Poland) Sandra Zaniewska (Bulgaria) Isabella Shinikova (Australia) Daniela Scivetti
August 9	Istanbul, Turkey; Hard $10,000; Singles draw – Doubles draw	(Turkey) Başak Eraydın (Bulgaria) Isabella Shinikova; 3–6 6–3 [10–4]	(Oman) Fatma Al-Nabhani (Portugal) Magali de Lattre	(New Zealand) Ellen Barry (Georgia (country)) Sofia Kvatsabaia	(Oman) Fatma Al-Nabhani (Poland) Sandra Zaniewska (Bulgaria) Isabella Shinikova (Australia) Daniela Scivetti
August 9	Itaparica, Brazil; Hard $10,000; Singles draw – Doubles draw	(Brazil) Roxane Vaisemberg; 7–6(8) 6–3	(Brazil) Ana Clara Duarte	(Brazil) Nathalia Rossi (Brazil) Fernanda Hermenegildo	(Austria) Nicole Rottmann (United States) Megan Falcon (Brazil) Nathaly Kurata (Brazil) Monique Albuquerque
August 9	Itaparica, Brazil; Hard $10,000; Singles draw – Doubles draw	(Brazil) Ana Clara Duarte (Brazil) Roxane Vaisemberg; 6–2 6–0	(Brazil) Fernanda Hermenegildo (Brazil) Nathalia Rossi	(Brazil) Nathalia Rossi (Brazil) Fernanda Hermenegildo	(Austria) Nicole Rottmann (United States) Megan Falcon (Brazil) Nathaly Kurata (Brazil) Monique Albuquerque
August 9	Kazan, Russia; Hard $50,000; Singles draw – Doubles draw	(Russia) Anna Lapushchenkova; 6–1 2–6 7–6(4)	(Russia) Vitalia Diatchenko	(Ukraine) Kateryna Kozlova (Ukraine) Lesia Tsurenko	(Russia) Alexandra Panova (Russia) Ekaterina Bychkova (Kyrgyzstan) Ksenia Palkina (Russia) Nadejda Guskova
August 9	Kazan, Russia; Hard $50,000; Singles draw – Doubles draw	(Belarus) Ekaterina Dzehalevich (Ukraine) Lesia Tsurenko; 6–2 6–3	(Uzbekistan) Albina Khabibulina (Kyrgyzstan) Ksenia Palkina	(Ukraine) Kateryna Kozlova (Ukraine) Lesia Tsurenko	(Russia) Alexandra Panova (Russia) Ekaterina Bychkova (Kyrgyzstan) Ksenia Palkina (Russia) Nadejda Guskova
August 9	Locri, Italy; Clay $10,000; Singles draw – Doubles draw	(Italy) Valentina Sulpizio; 6–1 6–0	(Argentina) Maria-Belen Corbalan	(Italy) Federica Di Sarra (Italy) Giulia Gasparri	(Italy) Giulia Pasini (Morocco) Fatima El Allami (Italy) Elena Bertoia (France) Morgane Pons
August 9	Locri, Italy; Clay $10,000; Singles draw – Doubles draw	(Italy) Federica Di Sarra (Italy) Valentina Sulpizio; 6–4 6–2	(Italy) Federica Grazioso (Italy) Alice Savoretti	(Italy) Federica Di Sarra (Italy) Giulia Gasparri	(Italy) Giulia Pasini (Morocco) Fatima El Allami (Italy) Elena Bertoia (France) Morgane Pons
August 16	Bucharest, Romania; Clay $10,000; Singles draw – Doubles draw	(Romania) Ingrid-Alexandra Radu; 7–5 1–6 6–3	(Romania) Mihaela Buzărnescu	(Romania) Cristina Mitu (Romania) Diana Enache	(France) Alice Tisset (Belgium) Gally De Wael (Romania) Simona Ionescu (Romania) Patricia Maria Țig
August 16	Bucharest, Romania; Clay $10,000; Singles draw – Doubles draw	(Romania) Laura-Ioana Andrei (Romania) Mihaela Buzărnescu; 6–1 6–3	(Romania) Diana Enache (Romania) Camelia Hristea	(Romania) Cristina Mitu (Romania) Diana Enache	(France) Alice Tisset (Belgium) Gally De Wael (Romania) Simona Ionescu (Romania) Patricia Maria Țig
August 16	Čakovec, Croatia; Clay $10,000; Singles draw – Doubles draw	(Slovenia) Nastja Kolar; 7–5 6–4	(Italy) Paola Cigui	(Czech Republic) Zuzana Zlochová (Slovakia) Lucia Vrsková	(Italy) Martina Caciotti (Croatia) Indire Akiki (Croatia) Ivana Klepić (Slovakia) Vivien Juhászová
August 16	Čakovec, Croatia; Clay $10,000; Singles draw – Doubles draw	(Slovenia) Nastja Kolar (Slovenia) Polona Reberšak; 6–0 6–1	(Slovakia) Katarína Baranová (Slovakia) Simonka Parajová	(Czech Republic) Zuzana Zlochová (Slovakia) Lucia Vrsková	(Italy) Martina Caciotti (Croatia) Indire Akiki (Croatia) Ivana Klepić (Slovakia) Vivien Juhászová
August 16	Todi, Italy; Clay $10,000; Singles draw – Doubles draw	(Italy) Federica Di Sarra; 6–1 6–3	(Austria) Lisa Maria Reichmann	(Italy) Alice Balducci (Russia) Marina Shamayko	(Bulgaria) Martina Gledacheva (Italy) Federica Grazioso (Italy) Maria Masini (Switzerland) Lisa Sabino
August 16	Todi, Italy; Clay $10,000; Singles draw – Doubles draw	(Switzerland) Lisa Sabino (Italy) Maria-Letizia Zavagli; 0–6 7–6(4) [10–8]	(Italy) Alice Balducci (Italy) Federica Grazioso	(Italy) Alice Balducci (Russia) Marina Shamayko	(Bulgaria) Martina Gledacheva (Italy) Federica Grazioso (Italy) Maria Masini (Switzerland) Lisa Sabino
August 16	Innsbruck, Austria; Clay $10,000; Singles draw – Doubles draw	(Switzerland) Amra Sadiković; 6–4 6–2	(New Zealand) Ellen Barry	(Switzerland) Myriam Casanova (Italy) Valentine Confalonieri	(Austria) Yvonne Neuwirth (Poland) Justyna Jegiołka (France) Victoria Larrière (France) Elixane Lechemia
August 16	Innsbruck, Austria; Clay $10,000; Singles draw – Doubles draw	(France) Victoria Larrière (France) Elixane Lechemia; Walkover	(Switzerland) Xenia Knoll (Switzerland) Amra Sadiković	(Switzerland) Myriam Casanova (Italy) Valentine Confalonieri	(Austria) Yvonne Neuwirth (Poland) Justyna Jegiołka (France) Victoria Larrière (France) Elixane Lechemia
August 16	Itaparica, Brazil; Clay $10,000; Singles draw – Doubles draw	(Brazil) Fernanda Hermenegildo; 6–1 6–7(5) 6–3	(Brazil) Roxane Vaisemberg	(United States) Megan Falcon (Brazil) Natasha Lotuffo	(Brazil) Monique Albuquerque (Brazil) Nathaly Kurata (Brazil) Nathalia Rossi (Austria) Nicole Rottmann
August 16	Itaparica, Brazil; Clay $10,000; Singles draw – Doubles draw	(Brazil) Natasha Lotuffo (Brazil) Roxane Vaisemberg; 6–1 6–2	(Brazil) Julianna Barbosa Bacelar (Brazil) Beatriz Maria Martins Cecato	(United States) Megan Falcon (Brazil) Natasha Lotuffo	(Brazil) Monique Albuquerque (Brazil) Nathaly Kurata (Brazil) Nathalia Rossi (Austria) Nicole Rottmann
August 16	Westende, Belgium; Hard $10,000; Singles draw – Doubles draw	(Australia) Johanna Konta; 6–1 6–0	(Belgium) Nicky Van Dyck	(Belgium) Alison Van Uytvanck (Croatia) Darija Jurak	(Netherlands) Quirine Lemoine (France) Audrey Bergot (Turkey) Pemra Özgen (Russia) Irina Khromacheva
August 16	Westende, Belgium; Hard $10,000; Singles draw – Doubles draw	(Netherlands) Quirine Lemoine (Netherlands) Demi Schuurs; 3–6 6–4 [10–4]	(Russia) Irina Khromacheva (Belgium) Alison Van Uytvanck	(Belgium) Alison Van Uytvanck (Croatia) Darija Jurak	(Netherlands) Quirine Lemoine (France) Audrey Bergot (Turkey) Pemra Özgen (Russia) Irina Khromacheva
August 16	Olomouc, Czech Republic; Clay $25,000; Singles draw – Doubles draw	(Austria) Patricia Mayr; 6–2 6–4	(Italy) Julia Mayr	(Slovenia) Andreja Klepač (Slovakia) Michaela Pochabová	(China) Sun Sheng-Nan (Italy) Nastassja Burnett (Serbia) Aleksandra Krunić (China) Lu Jing-jing
August 16	Olomouc, Czech Republic; Clay $25,000; Singles draw – Doubles draw	(Austria) Sandra Klemenschits (Austria) Patricia Mayr; 6–3 6–1	(Czech Republic) Iveta Gerlová (Czech Republic) Lucie Kriegsmannová	(Slovenia) Andreja Klepač (Slovakia) Michaela Pochabová	(China) Sun Sheng-Nan (Italy) Nastassja Burnett (Serbia) Aleksandra Krunić (China) Lu Jing-jing
August 16	Wahlstedt, Germany; Clay $10,000; Singles draw – Doubles draw	(Poland) Barbara Sobaszkiewicz; 6–0, 7–6^{(8–6)}	(Germany) Korina Perkovic	(France) Élodie Rogge-Dietrich (Poland) Olga Brózda	(Germany) Carina Witthöft (Russia) Aminat Kushkhova (Bulgaria) Isabella Shinikova (Germany) Anna Klasen
August 16	Wahlstedt, Germany; Clay $10,000; Singles draw – Doubles draw	(Poland) Olga Brózda (Poland) Natalia Kołat; 3–6 6–3 [10–8]	(Netherlands) Marcella Koek (Netherlands) Bernice van de Velde	(France) Élodie Rogge-Dietrich (Poland) Olga Brózda	(Germany) Carina Witthöft (Russia) Aminat Kushkhova (Bulgaria) Isabella Shinikova (Germany) Anna Klasen
August 16	Saint Petersburg, Russia; Clay $10,000; Singles draw – Doubles draw	(Russia) Nadejda Guskova; 6–2 7–6(5)	(Russia) Anna Arina Marenko	(Russia) Daria Kuchmina (Russia) Daria Mironova	(Russia) Alexandra Artamonova (Russia) Anna Rapoport (Russia) Viktoria Kamenskaya (Ukraine) Elizaveta Ianchuk
August 16	Saint Petersburg, Russia; Clay $10,000; Singles draw – Doubles draw	(Russia) Eugeniya Pashkova (Russia) Maria Zharkova; 6–4 5–7 [11–9]	(Ukraine) Valentyna Ivakhnenko (Ukraine) Mariya Malkhasyan	(Russia) Daria Kuchmina (Russia) Daria Mironova	(Russia) Alexandra Artamonova (Russia) Anna Rapoport (Russia) Viktoria Kamenskaya (Ukraine) Elizaveta Ianchuk
August 23	2010 EmblemHealth Bronx Open Bronx, United States; Hard $100,000+H; Singles draw – Doubles draw	(Russia) Anna Chakvetadze; 4–6 6–2 6–2	(Sweden) Sofia Arvidsson	(Russia) Ekaterina Makarova (Czech Republic) Klára Zakopalová	(Latvia) Anastasija Sevastova (Germany) Angelique Kerber (Czech Republic) Barbora Záhlavová-Strýcová (Czech Republic) Lucie Hradecká
August 23	2010 EmblemHealth Bronx Open Bronx, United States; Hard $100,000+H; Singles draw – Doubles draw	(Germany) Kristina Barrois (Austria) Yvonne Meusburger; 1–6 6–4 [15–13]	(South Africa) Natalie Grandin (United States) Abigail Spears	(Russia) Ekaterina Makarova (Czech Republic) Klára Zakopalová	(Latvia) Anastasija Sevastova (Germany) Angelique Kerber (Czech Republic) Barbora Záhlavová-Strýcová (Czech Republic) Lucie Hradecká
August 23	Braunschweig, Germany; Clay $10,000; Singles draw – Doubles draw	(Germany) Scarlett Werner; 6–3 6–0	(Russia) Aminat Kushkhova	(Germany) Carina Witthöft (Germany) Lena-Marie Hofmann	(Netherlands) Marcella Koek (Denmark) Karen Barbat (Germany) Korina Perkovic (Germany) Alexandra Kiesl
August 23	Braunschweig, Germany; Clay $10,000; Singles draw – Doubles draw	(Russia) Aminat Kushkhova (Russia) Olga Panova; 6–3 6–0	(Germany) Antonia Lottner (Germany) Jana Nabel	(Germany) Carina Witthöft (Germany) Lena-Marie Hofmann	(Netherlands) Marcella Koek (Denmark) Karen Barbat (Germany) Korina Perkovic (Germany) Alexandra Kiesl
August 23	Wanfercee-Baulet, Belgium; Clay $10,000; Singles draw – Doubles draw	(Italy) Annalisa Bona; 6–0 6–1	(Belgium) Nicky Van Dyck	(Romania) Diana Enache (France) Alizé Lim	(Germany) Bianca Koch (France) Irina Ramialison (Bulgaria) Martina Gledacheva (Belgium) Gally De Wael
August 23	Wanfercee-Baulet, Belgium; Clay $10,000; Singles draw – Doubles draw	(Romania) Diana Enache (France) Alizé Lim; 6–0 6–3	(Belgium) Gally De Wael (Morocco) Fatima El Allami	(Romania) Diana Enache (France) Alizé Lim	(Germany) Bianca Koch (France) Irina Ramialison (Bulgaria) Martina Gledacheva (Belgium) Gally De Wael
August 23	Pörtschach, Austria; Clay $10,000; Singles draw – Doubles draw	(Italy) Julia Mayr; 6–3 6–1	(Italy) Evelyn Mayr	(Serbia) Nataša Zorić (Italy) Vivienne Vierin	(Germany) Anne Schäfer (Italy) Martina Parmigiani (Austria) Marlena Metzinger (Austria) Janina Toljan
August 23	Pörtschach, Austria; Clay $10,000; Singles draw – Doubles draw	(Italy) Evelyn Mayr (Italy) Julia Mayr; 6–4 6–1	(Slovenia) Dalila Jakupovič (Italy) Vivienne Vierin	(Serbia) Nataša Zorić (Italy) Vivienne Vierin	(Germany) Anne Schäfer (Italy) Martina Parmigiani (Austria) Marlena Metzinger (Austria) Janina Toljan
August 23	Enschede, Netherlands; Clay $10,000; Singles draw – Doubles draw	(Netherlands) Bibiane Schoofs; 6–1 6–2	(Germany) Nicola Geuer	(Netherlands) Lisanne van Riet (United Kingdom) Katharina Brown	(Poland) Natalia Kołat (Russia) Avgusta Tsybysheva (Russia) Marina Melnikova (Netherlands) Sabine van der Sar
August 23	Enschede, Netherlands; Clay $10,000; Singles draw – Doubles draw	(Poland) Olga Brózda (Poland) Natalia Kołat; 6–1 6–3	(Germany) Carolin Daniels (Germany) Julia Wachaczyk	(Netherlands) Lisanne van Riet (United Kingdom) Katharina Brown	(Poland) Natalia Kołat (Russia) Avgusta Tsybysheva (Russia) Marina Melnikova (Netherlands) Sabine van der Sar
August 23	Vinkovci, Croatia; Clay $10,000; Singles draw – Doubles draw	(Hungary) Réka-Luca Jani; 6–2 6–4	(Czech Republic) Zuzana Linhová	(Switzerland) Conny Perrin (Romania) Raluca Elena Platon	(Croatia) Indire Akiki (Hungary) Zsófia Susányi (Slovenia) Polona Reberšak (Russia) Ksenia Gospodinova
August 23	Vinkovci, Croatia; Clay $10,000; Singles draw – Doubles draw	(Hungary) Réka-Luca Jani (Romania) Raluca Elena Platon; 6–3 6–0	(Croatia) Indire Akiki (Czech Republic) Zuzana Linhová	(Switzerland) Conny Perrin (Romania) Raluca Elena Platon	(Croatia) Indire Akiki (Hungary) Zsófia Susányi (Slovenia) Polona Reberšak (Russia) Ksenia Gospodinova
August 23	Prague, Czech Republic; Clay $10,000; Singles draw – Doubles draw	(Slovakia) Michaela Pochabová; 7–5 7–5	(Czech Republic) Lucie Kriegsmannová	(Czech Republic) Monika Tůmová (Czech Republic) Jana Jandová	(Czech Republic) Petra Rohanová (Czech Republic) Tereza Hladíková (Czech Republic) Denisa Allertová (Czech Republic) Martina Borecká
August 23	Prague, Czech Republic; Clay $10,000; Singles draw – Doubles draw	(Czech Republic) Iveta Gerlová (Czech Republic) Lucie Kriegsmannová; 6–1 6–3	(Slovakia) Zuzana Luknárová (Slovakia) Karin Morgosová	(Czech Republic) Monika Tůmová (Czech Republic) Jana Jandová	(Czech Republic) Petra Rohanová (Czech Republic) Tereza Hladíková (Czech Republic) Denisa Allertová (Czech Republic) Martina Borecká
August 23	Doboj, Bosnia and Herzegovina; Clay $10,000; Singles draw – Doubles draw	(Slovakia) Zuzana Zlochová; 7–6(4) 7–5	(Bosnia and Herzegovina) Jasmina Kajtazovič	(Italy) Nicole Clerico (Romania) Patricia Chirea	(Romania) Camelia Hristea (Bulgaria) Dalia Zafirova (Bulgaria) Nadejda Vassileva (Germany) Anna Zaja
August 23	Doboj, Bosnia and Herzegovina; Clay $10,000; Singles draw – Doubles draw	(Bosnia and Herzegovina) Jasmina Kajtazovič (Slovakia) Zuzana Zlochová; 6–1 6–2	(Romania) Alexandra Damaschin (Germany) Anna Zaja	(Italy) Nicole Clerico (Romania) Patricia Chirea	(Romania) Camelia Hristea (Bulgaria) Dalia Zafirova (Bulgaria) Nadejda Vassileva (Germany) Anna Zaja
August 23	Saitama, Japan; Hard $10,000; Singles draw – Doubles draw	(Chinese Taipei) Hsu Wen-hsin; 6–1 1–6 6–3	(China) Duan Yingying	(Japan) Akiko Yonemura (Japan) Erika Takao	(Japan) Kumiko Iijima (Japan) Akari Inoue (China) Wang Qiang (Japan) Miyabi Inoue
August 23	Saitama, Japan; Hard $10,000; Singles draw – Doubles draw	(Japan) Akari Inoue (Japan) Kotomi Takahata; 6–3 6–3	(Japan) Kumiko Iijima (Japan) Akiko Yonemura	(Japan) Akiko Yonemura (Japan) Erika Takao	(Japan) Kumiko Iijima (Japan) Akari Inoue (China) Wang Qiang (Japan) Miyabi Inoue
August 23	Buenos Aires, Argentina; Clay $10,000; Singles draw – Doubles draw	(Argentina) Mailen Auroux; 6–2 7–5	(Argentina) Vanesa Furlanetto	(Argentina) Tatiana Búa (Argentina) Carla Lucero	(Chile) Daniela Seguel (Germany) Karolina Nowak (Paraguay) Isabella Robbiani (Argentina) Aranza Salut
August 23	Buenos Aires, Argentina; Clay $10,000; Singles draw – Doubles draw	(Argentina) Mailen Auroux (Colombia) Karen Castiblanco; 7–5 6–0	(Argentina) Estefania Donnet (Argentina) Carla Lucero	(Argentina) Tatiana Búa (Argentina) Carla Lucero	(Chile) Daniela Seguel (Germany) Karolina Nowak (Paraguay) Isabella Robbiani (Argentina) Aranza Salut
August 23	San Luis Potosí, Mexico; Hard $10,000; Singles draw – Doubles draw	(United States) Macall Harkins; 6–1 6–4	(Belarus) Sasha Khabibulina	(United States) Stacey Tan (Mexico) Carolina Betancourt	(Mexico) Marcela Zacarías (Austria) Nicole Rottmann (Serbia) Neda Kozić (Mexico) Nazari Urbina
August 23	San Luis Potosí, Mexico; Hard $10,000; Singles draw – Doubles draw	(United States) Macall Harkins (Austria) Nicole Rottmann; 6–1 6–4	(Argentina) Andrea Benítez (United States) Nadia Echeverria Alam	(United States) Stacey Tan (Mexico) Carolina Betancourt	(Mexico) Marcela Zacarías (Austria) Nicole Rottmann (Serbia) Neda Kozić (Mexico) Nazari Urbina
August 30	Tsukuba, Ibaraki, Japan; Hard $25,000; Singles draw – Doubles draw	(Thailand) Noppawan Lertcheewakarn; 6–4 6–1	(Japan) Shiho Akita	(South Korea) Lee Ye-ra (Japan) Sachie Ishizu	(China) Duan Yingying (Japan) Erika Sema (China) Lu Jia-jing (Thailand) Nudnida Luangnam
August 30	Tsukuba, Ibaraki, Japan; Hard $25,000; Singles draw – Doubles draw	(Japan) Kumiko Iijima (Japan) Akiko Yonemura; 4–6 7–6(6) [10–7]	(Chinese Taipei) Chan Chin-wei (Chinese Taipei) Chen Yi	(South Korea) Lee Ye-ra (Japan) Sachie Ishizu	(China) Duan Yingying (Japan) Erika Sema (China) Lu Jia-jing (Thailand) Nudnida Luangnam
August 30	Gliwice, Poland; Clay $10,000; Singles draw – Doubles draw	(Poland) Paula Kania; 7–6(2) 3–6 7–5	(Poland) Anna Korzeniak	(Poland) Katarzyna Kawa (Poland) Justyna Jegiołka	(Poland) Barbara Sobaszkiewicz (Russia) Anna Rapoport (Russia) Anastasia Mukhametova (Poland) Karolina Kosińska
August 30	Gliwice, Poland; Clay $10,000; Singles draw – Doubles draw	(Poland) Justyna Jegiołka (Poland) Katarzyna Kawa; 6–2 7–6(4)	(Poland) Olga Brózda (Poland) Veronika Domagala	(Poland) Katarzyna Kawa (Poland) Justyna Jegiołka	(Poland) Barbara Sobaszkiewicz (Russia) Anna Rapoport (Russia) Anastasia Mukhametova (Poland) Karolina Kosińska
August 30	Mollerussa, Spain; Hard $10,000; Singles draw – Doubles draw	(Spain) Estrella Cabeza Candela; 6–2 6–4	(Ukraine) Yevgeniya Kryvoruchko	(Russia) Marta Sirotkina (Israel) Keren Shlomo	(Spain) Yvonne Cavallé-Reimers (Spain) Pilar Domínguez López (Russia) Olga Panova (Norway) Ulrikke Eikeri
August 30	Mollerussa, Spain; Hard $10,000; Singles draw – Doubles draw	(Ukraine) Yevgeniya Kryvoruchko (Morocco) Nadia Lalami; 6–3 5–7 [10–8]	(Russia) Aminat Kushkhova (Russia) Olga Panova	(Russia) Marta Sirotkina (Israel) Keren Shlomo	(Spain) Yvonne Cavallé-Reimers (Spain) Pilar Domínguez López (Russia) Olga Panova (Norway) Ulrikke Eikeri
August 30	Bassano del Grappa, Italy; Clay $10,000; Singles draw – Doubles draw	(Italy) Paola Cigui; 6–4 6–1	(Austria) Tina Schiechtl	(Italy) Gioia Barbieri (Italy) Alice Moroni	(Italy) Anna Remondina (Russia) Marina Shamayko (Italy) Giulia Gabba (Switzerland) Clelia Melena
August 30	Bassano del Grappa, Italy; Clay $10,000; Singles draw – Doubles draw	(Italy) Federica Grazioso (Italy) Vivienne Vierin; 6–1 6–3	(Italy) Giulia Gasparri (Italy) Verdiana Verardi	(Italy) Gioia Barbieri (Italy) Alice Moroni	(Italy) Anna Remondina (Russia) Marina Shamayko (Italy) Giulia Gabba (Switzerland) Clelia Melena
August 30	Middelburg, Netherlands; Clay $10,000; Singles draw – Doubles draw	(Netherlands) Angelique van der Meet; 6–1 6–3	(Netherlands) Lesley Kerkhove	(Netherlands) Sabine van der Sar (Netherlands) Daniëlle Harmsen	(France) Océane Adam (Morocco) Fatima El Allami (Sweden) Anna Brazhnikova (Netherlands) Bernice van de Velde
August 30	Middelburg, Netherlands; Clay $10,000; Singles draw – Doubles draw	(Netherlands) Quirine Lemoine (Netherlands) Sabine van der Sar; 6–1 6–0	(Netherlands) Bernice van de Velde (Netherlands) Angelique van der Meet	(Netherlands) Sabine van der Sar (Netherlands) Daniëlle Harmsen	(France) Océane Adam (Morocco) Fatima El Allami (Sweden) Anna Brazhnikova (Netherlands) Bernice van de Velde
August 30	Balş, Romania; Clay $10,000; Singles draw – Doubles draw	(Romania) Mihaela Buzărnescu; 6–3 6–2	(Romania) Alexandra Cadanțu	(Bulgaria) Martina Gledacheva (Romania) Diana Enache	(Italy) Valentina Sulpizio (Romania) Sabina Lupu (Romania) Ingrid-Alexandra Radu (Romania) Ionela-Andreea Iova
August 30	Balş, Romania; Clay $10,000; Singles draw – Doubles draw	(Romania) Alexandra Cadanțu (Romania) Alexandra Damaschin; 6–3 7–5	(Bulgaria) Martina Gledacheva (Italy) Valentina Sulpizio	(Bulgaria) Martina Gledacheva (Romania) Diana Enache	(Italy) Valentina Sulpizio (Romania) Sabina Lupu (Romania) Ingrid-Alexandra Radu (Romania) Ionela-Andreea Iova
August 30	Osijek, Croatia; Clay $10,000; Singles draw – Doubles draw	(Switzerland) Conny Perrin; 7–6(10) 4–6 6–1	(Hungary) Réka-Luca Jani	(Slovakia) Klaudia Boczová (Serbia) Dunja Šunkić	(Hungary) Zsófia Susányi (Serbia) Nataša Zorić (Slovakia) Katarína Maráčková (France) Amandine Hesse
August 30	Osijek, Croatia; Clay $10,000; Singles draw – Doubles draw	(Hungary) Réka-Luca Jani (Czech Republic) Martina Kubičíková; 6–1 6–1	(Croatia) Petra Šunić (Serbia) Nataša Zorić	(Slovakia) Klaudia Boczová (Serbia) Dunja Šunkić	(Hungary) Zsófia Susányi (Serbia) Nataša Zorić (Slovakia) Katarína Maráčková (France) Amandine Hesse
August 30	Brčko, Bosnia and Herzegovina; Clay $10,000; Singles draw – Doubles draw	(Slovakia) Zuzana Zlochová; 6–4 6–4	(Czech Republic) Zuzana Linhová	(Bosnia and Herzegovina) Ema Burgić (Russia) Yana Buchina	(Bosnia and Herzegovina) Jasmina Kajtazovič (Germany) Bianca Koch (Latvia) Diāna Marcinkēviča (Hungary) Csilla Argyelán
August 30	Brčko, Bosnia and Herzegovina; Clay $10,000; Singles draw – Doubles draw	(Bosnia and Herzegovina) Ema Burgić (Bosnia and Herzegovina) Jasmina Kajtazovič; 6–3 6–3	(Romania) Patricia Chirea (Russia) Margarita Lazareva	(Bosnia and Herzegovina) Ema Burgić (Russia) Yana Buchina	(Bosnia and Herzegovina) Jasmina Kajtazovič (Germany) Bianca Koch (Latvia) Diāna Marcinkēviča (Hungary) Csilla Argyelán
August 30	Istanbul, Turkey; Hard $10,000; Singles draw – Doubles draw	(Italy) Annalisa Bona; 6–2 6–2	(Romania) Laura-Ioana Andrei	(Turkey) Başak Eraydın (Austria) Janina Toljan	(Kyrgyzstan) Ksenia Palkina (Germany) Jasmin Steinherr (Australia) Jade Hopper (Denmark) Malou Ejdesgaard
August 30	Istanbul, Turkey; Hard $10,000; Singles draw – Doubles draw	(Denmark) Malou Ejdesgaard (Kyrgyzstan) Ksenia Palkina; 6–4 6–4	(Belgium) Gally De Wael (Austria) Janina Toljan	(Turkey) Başak Eraydın (Austria) Janina Toljan	(Kyrgyzstan) Ksenia Palkina (Germany) Jasmin Steinherr (Australia) Jade Hopper (Denmark) Malou Ejdesgaard
August 30	Santa Fe, Argentina; Clay $10,000; Singles draw – Doubles draw	(Chile) Camila Silva; 1–6 6–3 7–6(7)	(Argentina) Vanesa Furlanetto	(Argentina) Aranza Salut (Argentina) Estefania Donnet	(United States) Nataly Yoo (Argentina) Tatiana Búa (Argentina) Lucía Jara-Lozano (Argentina) Carla Lucero
August 30	Santa Fe, Argentina; Clay $10,000; Singles draw – Doubles draw	(Colombia) Karen Castiblanco (Chile) Camila Silva; 4–6 6–3 [10–6]	(Argentina) Tatiana Búa (Argentina) Aranza Salut	(Argentina) Aranza Salut (Argentina) Estefania Donnet	(United States) Nataly Yoo (Argentina) Tatiana Búa (Argentina) Lucía Jara-Lozano (Argentina) Carla Lucero

== September ==
Week of	Tournament	Winner	Runners-up	Semifinalists	Quarterfinalists
September 6	Biella, Italy; Clay $100,000; Singles draw – Doubles draw	(Czech Republic) Renata Voráčová; 6–4 6–2	(Czech Republic) Zuzana Ondrášková	(Germany) Tatjana Malek (Czech Republic) Sandra Záhlavová	(Spain) Laura Pous Tió (France) Mathilde Johansson (France) Laura Thorpe (Italy) Tathiana Garbin
September 6	Biella, Italy; Clay $100,000; Singles draw – Doubles draw	(Ukraine) Mariya Koryttseva (Romania) Ioana Raluca Olaru; 7–5 6–4	(Slovenia) Andreja Klepač (France) Aurélie Védy	(Germany) Tatjana Malek (Czech Republic) Sandra Záhlavová	(Spain) Laura Pous Tió (France) Mathilde Johansson (France) Laura Thorpe (Italy) Tathiana Garbin
September 6	2010 Open GDF Suez de la Porte du Hainaut; Denain, France; Clay $25,000; Singles draw – Doubles draw	(France) Anaïs Laurendon; 6–3 7–5	(France) Stéphanie Cohen-Aloro	(Italy) Giulia Gatto-Monticone (Russia) Nadejda Guskova	(Belgium) Valerie Verhamme (Bulgaria) Elitsa Kostova (Spain) Lara Arruabarrena Vecino (Russia) Nanuli Pipiya
September 6	2010 Open GDF Suez de la Porte du Hainaut; Denain, France; Clay $25,000; Singles draw – Doubles draw	(Russia) Nadejda Guskova (Ukraine) Maryna Zanevska; 6–2 6–0	(Italy) Evelyn Mayr (Italy) Julia Mayr	(Italy) Giulia Gatto-Monticone (Russia) Nadejda Guskova	(Belgium) Valerie Verhamme (Bulgaria) Elitsa Kostova (Spain) Lara Arruabarrena Vecino (Russia) Nanuli Pipiya
September 6	2010 TEAN International; Alphen aan den Rijn, Netherlands; Clay $25,000; Singles draw – Doubles draw	(Germany) Julia Schruff; 6–0 6–3	(France) Irena Pavlovic	(Netherlands) Arantxa Rus (Russia) Valeria Solovieva	(Ukraine) Yuliya Beygelzimer (Netherlands) Angelique van der Meet (Spain) Estrella Cabeza Candela (Slovenia) Tadeja Majerič
September 6	2010 TEAN International; Alphen aan den Rijn, Netherlands; Clay $25,000; Singles draw – Doubles draw	(Netherlands) Daniëlle Harmsen (Netherlands) Bibiane Schoofs; 6–3 6–2	(Russia) Ksenia Lykina (France) Irena Pavlovic	(Netherlands) Arantxa Rus (Russia) Valeria Solovieva	(Ukraine) Yuliya Beygelzimer (Netherlands) Angelique van der Meet (Spain) Estrella Cabeza Candela (Slovenia) Tadeja Majerič
September 6	Katowice, Poland; Clay $25,000; Singles draw – Doubles draw	(Poland) Magda Linette; 3–6 6–2 6–2	(Czech Republic) Eva Birnerová	(Georgia (country)) Oksana Kalashnikova (Ukraine) Oksana Lyubtsova	(Poland) Paula Kania (Poland) Anna Korzeniak (Slovakia) Kristína Kučová (Slovakia) Lenka Wienerová
September 6	Katowice, Poland; Clay $25,000; Singles draw – Doubles draw	(Poland) Olga Brózda (Poland) Natalia Kołat; 6–3 6–3	(Poland) Katarzyna Piter (Poland) Barbara Sobaszkiewicz	(Georgia (country)) Oksana Kalashnikova (Ukraine) Oksana Lyubtsova	(Poland) Paula Kania (Poland) Anna Korzeniak (Slovakia) Kristína Kučová (Slovakia) Lenka Wienerová
September 6	Casale Monferrato, Italy; Clay $10,000; Singles draw – Doubles draw	(Italy) Federica Di Sarra; 6–3 6–4	(Italy) Erika Zanchetta	(Italy) Giulia Gabba (Italy) Vivienne Vierin	(Italy) Valentine Confalonieri (Italy) Stefania Chieppa (Italy) Chiara Mendo (Italy) Gioia Barbieri
September 6	Casale Monferrato, Italy; Clay $10,000; Singles draw – Doubles draw	(Italy) Federica Di Sarra (Italy) Giulia Gabba; 6–2 6–2	(Italy) Federica Grazioso (Italy) Vivienne Vierin	(Italy) Giulia Gabba (Italy) Vivienne Vierin	(Italy) Valentine Confalonieri (Italy) Stefania Chieppa (Italy) Chiara Mendo (Italy) Gioia Barbieri
September 6	Sarajevo, Bosnia and Herzegovina; Clay $10,000; Singles draw – Doubles draw	(Croatia) Ani Mijačika; 6–1 6–2	(Bulgaria) Viktorija Tomova	(Russia) Yana Buchina (Romania) Claudia Antonia Enache	(Norway) Emma Flood (Bulgaria) Dalia Zafirova (Slovakia) Zuzana Zlochová (Hungary) Blanka Szávay
September 6	Sarajevo, Bosnia and Herzegovina; Clay $10,000; Singles draw – Doubles draw	(Russia) Yana Buchina (Russia) Polina Rodionova; 7–6(5) 2–6 [10–5]	(Croatia) Matea Čutura (Croatia) Ani Mijačika	(Russia) Yana Buchina (Romania) Claudia Antonia Enache	(Norway) Emma Flood (Bulgaria) Dalia Zafirova (Slovakia) Zuzana Zlochová (Hungary) Blanka Szávay
September 6	Madrid, Spain; Hard $10,000; Singles draw – Doubles draw	(Russia) Marta Sirotkina; 4–6 6–4 6–4	(United Kingdom) Naomi Broady	(Italy) Alice Savoretti (United Kingdom) Emily Webley-Smith	(Spain) Yvonne Cavallé-Reimers (Spain) Rocío de la Torre-Sánchez (Spain) Carmen López Rueda (Mexico) Ximena Hermoso
September 6	Madrid, Spain; Hard $10,000; Singles draw – Doubles draw	(United Kingdom) Naomi Broady (United Kingdom) Emily Webley-Smith; 6–2 6–3	(United Kingdom) Jennifer Ren (Russia) Marta Sirotkina	(Italy) Alice Savoretti (United Kingdom) Emily Webley-Smith	(Spain) Yvonne Cavallé-Reimers (Spain) Rocío de la Torre-Sánchez (Spain) Carmen López Rueda (Mexico) Ximena Hermoso
September 6	Larissa, Greece; Hard $10,000; Singles draw – Doubles draw	(Russia) Alexandra Artamonova; 4–6 6–2 7–5	(Israel) Ofri Lankri	(Belgium) Gally De Wael (Uzbekistan) Vlada Ekshibarova	(Israel) Keren Shlomo (United Kingdom) Anna Fitzpatrick (Romania) Claudia Dumitrescu (United States) Samantha Powers
September 6	Larissa, Greece; Hard $10,000; Singles draw – Doubles draw	(Russia) Alexandra Artamonova (Latvia) Diāna Marcinkēviča; 6–1 6–1	(Romania) Claudia Dumitrescu (Russia) Diana Isaeva	(Belgium) Gally De Wael (Uzbekistan) Vlada Ekshibarova	(Israel) Keren Shlomo (United Kingdom) Anna Fitzpatrick (Romania) Claudia Dumitrescu (United States) Samantha Powers
September 6	Noto, Japan; Carpet $25,000; Singles draw – Doubles draw	(Thailand) Tamarine Tanasugarn; 7–5 6–2	(Thailand) Nudnida Luangnam	(Japan) Akari Inoue (China) Wang Qiang	(Chinese Taipei) Hsu Wen-hsin (Japan) Kazusa Ito (Japan) Shiho Hisamatsu (Japan) Shuko Aoyama
September 6	Noto, Japan; Carpet $25,000; Singles draw – Doubles draw	(Japan) Rika Fujiwara (Thailand) Tamarine Tanasugarn; 6–3 6–3	(Japan) Shuko Aoyama (Japan) Akari Inoue	(Japan) Akari Inoue (China) Wang Qiang	(Chinese Taipei) Hsu Wen-hsin (Japan) Kazusa Ito (Japan) Shiho Hisamatsu (Japan) Shuko Aoyama
September 6	Cairns, Australia; Hard $25,000; Singles draw – Doubles draw	(Brazil) Ana Clara Duarte; 6–3 3–6 6–2	(Thailand) Noppawan Lertcheewakarn	(Australia) Tammi Patterson (United Kingdom) Melanie South	(New Zealand) Sacha Jones (South Korea) Han Sung-hee (Australia) Olivia Rogowska (Australia) Azra Hadzic
September 6	Cairns, Australia; Hard $25,000; Singles draw – Doubles draw	(Australia) Tammi Patterson (Australia) Olivia Rogowska; 6–3 7–6(3)	(Australia) Tyra Calderwood (Thailand) Noppawan Lertcheewakarn	(Australia) Tammi Patterson (United Kingdom) Melanie South	(New Zealand) Sacha Jones (South Korea) Han Sung-hee (Australia) Olivia Rogowska (Australia) Azra Hadzic
September 6	Buenos Aires, Argentina; Clay $10,000; Singles draw – Doubles draw	(Argentina) Vanesa Furlanetto; 6–3 6–2	(Argentina) Carla Lucero	(Colombia) Karen Castiblanco (Brazil) Teliana Pereira	(Argentina) Carolina Zeballos (Germany) Karolina Nowak (Chile) Camila Silva (Argentina) Sofía Luini
September 6	Buenos Aires, Argentina; Clay $10,000; Singles draw – Doubles draw	(Argentina) Luciana Sarmenti (Argentina) Emilia Yorio; 7–5 6–1	(Argentina) Florencia di Biasi (Argentina) Verónica Spiegel	(Colombia) Karen Castiblanco (Brazil) Teliana Pereira	(Argentina) Carolina Zeballos (Germany) Karolina Nowak (Chile) Camila Silva (Argentina) Sofía Luini
September 13	Sofia, Bulgaria; Clay $100,000; Singles draw – Doubles draw	(France) Mathilde Johansson; 6–4 3–1 Retired	(Spain) Carla Suárez Navarro	(France) Alizé Cornet (Italy) Tathiana Garbin	(Slovenia) Maša Zec Peškirič (Austria) Yvonne Meusburger (Croatia) Petra Martić (Greece) Eleni Daniilidou
September 13	Sofia, Bulgaria; Clay $100,000; Singles draw – Doubles draw	(Greece) Eleni Daniilidou (Germany) Jasmin Wöhr; 6–3 6–4	(Austria) Sandra Klemenschits (Germany) Tatjana Malek	(France) Alizé Cornet (Italy) Tathiana Garbin	(Slovenia) Maša Zec Peškirič (Austria) Yvonne Meusburger (Croatia) Petra Martić (Greece) Eleni Daniilidou
September 13	Zagreb, Croatia; Clay $25,000; Singles draw – Doubles draw	(Czech Republic) Renata Voráčová; 6–1 4–6 6–4	(Poland) Magda Linette	(Slovakia) Klaudia Boczová (Croatia) Ana Vrljić	(Croatia) Ani Mijačika (Slovakia) Kristína Kučová (France) Anaïs Laurendon (Bulgaria) Dia Evtimova
September 13	Zagreb, Croatia; Clay $25,000; Singles draw – Doubles draw	(Argentina) Mailen Auroux (Serbia) Nataša Zorić; 7–5 5–7 [14–12]	(Croatia) Ani Mijačika (Croatia) Ana Vrljić	(Slovakia) Klaudia Boczová (Croatia) Ana Vrljić	(Croatia) Ani Mijačika (Slovakia) Kristína Kučová (France) Anaïs Laurendon (Bulgaria) Dia Evtimova
September 13	Podgorica, Montenegro; Clay $25,000; Singles draw – Doubles draw	(Romania) Irina-Camelia Begu; 6–1 6–1	(Italy) Annalisa Bona	(Ukraine) Yuliya Beygelzimer (France) Audrey Bergot	(Romania) Mihaela Buzărnescu (Ukraine) Maryna Zanevska (Slovenia) Tadeja Majerič (Slovakia) Lenka Wienerová
September 13	Podgorica, Montenegro; Clay $25,000; Singles draw – Doubles draw	(Romania) Irina-Camelia Begu (Romania) Mihaela Buzărnescu; 5–7 7–5 [12–10]	(Russia) Valeria Solovieva (Ukraine) Maryna Zanevska	(Ukraine) Yuliya Beygelzimer (France) Audrey Bergot	(Romania) Mihaela Buzărnescu (Ukraine) Maryna Zanevska (Slovenia) Tadeja Majerič (Slovakia) Lenka Wienerová
September 13	Mytilini, Greece; Hard $10,000; Singles draw – Doubles draw	(Greece) Despina Papamichail; 3–6 6–3 7–5	(Germany) Anna Zaja	(Uzbekistan) Vlada Ekshibarova (Russia) Diana Arutyunova	(Israel) Keren Shlomo (Germany) Jasmin Steinherr (Russia) Diana Isaeva (United States) Samantha Powers
September 13	Mytilini, Greece; Hard $10,000; Singles draw – Doubles draw	(Israel) Chen Astrogo (Israel) Keren Shlomo; 6–1 6–3	(Turkey) Başak Eraydın (Russia) Diana Isaeva	(Uzbekistan) Vlada Ekshibarova (Russia) Diana Arutyunova	(Israel) Keren Shlomo (Germany) Jasmin Steinherr (Russia) Diana Isaeva (United States) Samantha Powers
September 13	Lleida, Spain; Clay $10,000; Singles draw – Doubles draw	(France) Elixane Lechemia; 7–6(3) 6–1	(Morocco) Nadia Lalami	(Spain) Aida Martínez Sanjuán (United Kingdom) Amanda Carreras	(France) Alix Collombon (Russia) Avgusta Tsybysheva (Romania) Ilinca Stoica (Germany) Katharina Holert
September 13	Lleida, Spain; Clay $10,000; Singles draw – Doubles draw	(Norway) Ulrikke Eikeri (Norway) Caroline Rohde-Moe; 7–5 5–0 Retired	(France) Alix Collombon (France) Jessica Ginier	(Spain) Aida Martínez Sanjuán (United Kingdom) Amanda Carreras	(France) Alix Collombon (Russia) Avgusta Tsybysheva (Romania) Ilinca Stoica (Germany) Katharina Holert
September 13	Redding, United States; Hard $25,000; Singles draw – Doubles draw	(United States) Jamie Hampton; 3–6 6–1 6–4	(Croatia) Jelena Pandžić	(Ukraine) Tetiana Luzhanska (Germany) Laura Siegemund	(Venezuela) Gabriela Paz (United States) Allie Will (Russia) Daria Gavrilova (United States) Yasmin Schnack
September 13	Redding, United States; Hard $25,000; Singles draw – Doubles draw	(United States) Christina Fusano (United States) Yasmin Schnack; 6–2 3–6 [10–6]	(United States) Kim-Anh Nguyen (Croatia) Jelena Pandžić	(Ukraine) Tetiana Luzhanska (Germany) Laura Siegemund	(Venezuela) Gabriela Paz (United States) Allie Will (Russia) Daria Gavrilova (United States) Yasmin Schnack
September 13	Caracas, Venezuela; Hard $10,000; Singles draw – Doubles draw	(Venezuela) Adriana Pérez; 6–3 6–1	(Venezuela) Andrea Gámiz	(Austria) Nicole Rottmann (Belgium) Gally De Wael	(United States) Nataly Yoo (Venezuela) Stephany Gámiz (Venezuela) Ana Gabriela Gerbasi (Argentina) Guadalupe Moreno
September 13	Caracas, Venezuela; Hard $10,000; Singles draw – Doubles draw	(Belgium) Gally De Wael (Austria) Nicole Rottmann; 6–2 1–6 [10–4]	(Venezuela) Andrea Gámiz (Venezuela) Adriana Pérez	(Austria) Nicole Rottmann (Belgium) Gally De Wael	(United States) Nataly Yoo (Venezuela) Stephany Gámiz (Venezuela) Ana Gabriela Gerbasi (Argentina) Guadalupe Moreno
September 13	Kyoto, Japan; Carpet $10,000; Singles draw – Doubles draw	(Japan) Makiho Kozawa; 7–5 6–2	(Thailand) Nudnida Luangnam	(Japan) Ayumi Oka (Japan) Kotomi Takahata	(Japan) Tomoko Taira (Japan) Kazusa Ito (Japan) Yuka Mori (Japan) Akiko Omae
September 13	Kyoto, Japan; Carpet $10,000; Singles draw – Doubles draw	(Japan) Kazusa Ito (Japan) Tomoko Taira; 6–3 7–6(5)	(Japan) Ayumi Oka (Japan) Kaori Onishi	(Japan) Ayumi Oka (Japan) Kotomi Takahata	(Japan) Tomoko Taira (Japan) Kazusa Ito (Japan) Yuka Mori (Japan) Akiko Omae
September 13	Itapema, Brazil; Clay $10,000; Singles draw – Doubles draw	(Brazil) Roxane Vaisemberg; 6–0 6–0	(Ecuador) Marie Elise Casares	(Brazil) Natalia Cheng (Brazil) Natasha Lotuffo	(Brazil) Gabriella Barbosa-Costa Silva (Argentina) Carla Lucero (Brazil) Nathalia Rossi (Brazil) Carla Forte
September 13	Itapema, Brazil; Clay $10,000; Singles draw – Doubles draw	(Brazil) Monique Albuquerque (Brazil) Roxane Vaisemberg; 6–3 6–3	(Brazil) Maria Fernanda Alves (Brazil) Natalia Cheng	(Brazil) Natalia Cheng (Brazil) Natasha Lotuffo	(Brazil) Gabriella Barbosa-Costa Silva (Argentina) Carla Lucero (Brazil) Nathalia Rossi (Brazil) Carla Forte
September 13	Mestre, Italy; Clay $50,000; Singles draw – Doubles draw	(Czech Republic) Zuzana Ondrášková; 6–3 6–3	(Czech Republic) Lucie Hradecká	(Czech Republic) Eva Birnerová (Germany) Julia Schruff	(Slovenia) Andreja Klepač (Ukraine) Mariya Koryttseva (Netherlands) Elise Tamaëla (Netherlands) Arantxa Rus
September 13	Mestre, Italy; Clay $50,000; Singles draw – Doubles draw	(Italy) Claudia Giovine (Italy) Karin Knapp; 6–7(6) 7–5 [13–11]	(Czech Republic) Eva Birnerová (Slovenia) Andreja Klepač	(Czech Republic) Eva Birnerová (Germany) Julia Schruff	(Slovenia) Andreja Klepač (Ukraine) Mariya Koryttseva (Netherlands) Elise Tamaëla (Netherlands) Arantxa Rus
September 13	Darwin, Australia; Hard $25,000; Singles draw – Doubles draw	(Australia) Olivia Rogowska; 6–2 2–6 6–0	(United Kingdom) Naomi Cavaday	(Australia) Jessica Moore (Australia) Tammi Patterson	(France) Victoria Larrière (Japan) Chiaki Okadaue (United Kingdom) Melanie South (Japan) Kumiko Iijima
September 13	Darwin, Australia; Hard $25,000; Singles draw – Doubles draw	(Japan) Kumiko Iijima (Japan) Yurika Sema; 6–4 6–1	(Australia) Alenka Hubacek (Australia) Tammi Patterson	(Australia) Jessica Moore (Australia) Tammi Patterson	(France) Victoria Larrière (Japan) Chiaki Okadaue (United Kingdom) Melanie South (Japan) Kumiko Iijima
September 20	Saint-Malo, France; Clay $100,000+H; Singles draw – Doubles draw	(Italy) Romina Oprandi; 6–2 2–6 6–2	(France) Alizé Cornet	(France) Virginie Razzano (France) Olivia Sanchez	(Switzerland) Timea Bacsinszky (Czech Republic) Sandra Záhlavová (Czech Republic) Zuzana Ondrášková (France) Anaïs Laurendon
September 20	Saint-Malo, France; Clay $100,000+H; Singles draw – Doubles draw	(Czech Republic) Petra Cetkovská (Czech Republic) Lucie Hradecká; 6–4 6–2	(Ukraine) Mariya Koryttseva (Romania) Ioana Raluca Olaru	(France) Virginie Razzano (France) Olivia Sanchez	(Switzerland) Timea Bacsinszky (Czech Republic) Sandra Záhlavová (Czech Republic) Zuzana Ondrášková (France) Anaïs Laurendon
September 20	Aegon GB Pro-Series Shrewsbury; Shrewsbury, United Kingdom; Hard $75,000; Singles draw – Doubles draw	(Czech Republic) Eva Birnerová; 7–6(1) 3–6 6–0	(Luxembourg) Anne Kremer	(Germany) Kristina Barrois (Russia) Vesna Manasieva	(Russia) Vitalia Diatchenko (Croatia) Ana Vrljić (United Kingdom) Naomi Broady (United Kingdom) Heather Watson
September 20	Aegon GB Pro-Series Shrewsbury; Shrewsbury, United Kingdom; Hard $75,000; Singles draw – Doubles draw	(Russia) Vitalia Diatchenko (France) Irena Pavlovic; 4–6 6–4 [10–6]	(France) Claire Feuerstein (Russia) Vesna Manasieva	(Germany) Kristina Barrois (Russia) Vesna Manasieva	(Russia) Vitalia Diatchenko (Croatia) Ana Vrljić (United Kingdom) Naomi Broady (United Kingdom) Heather Watson
September 20	Madrid, Spain; Hard $10,000; Singles draw – Doubles draw	(Germany) Katharina Holert; 3–6 6–3 6–2	(Spain) Silvia García Jiménez	(Austria) Janina Toljan (Spain) Pilar Domíguez López	(Spain) Arabela Fernández Rabener (Romania) Diana Stomlega (Germany) Jasmin Steinherr (Spain) Rocío de la Torre-Sánchez
September 20	Madrid, Spain; Hard $10,000; Singles draw – Doubles draw	(Germany) Lena-Marie Hofmann (Austria) Janina Toljan; 7–6(6) 7–5	(Spain) Laura Apaolaza Miradevilla (Spain) Yvonne Cavallé-Reimers	(Austria) Janina Toljan (Spain) Pilar Domíguez López	(Spain) Arabela Fernández Rabener (Romania) Diana Stomlega (Germany) Jasmin Steinherr (Spain) Rocío de la Torre-Sánchez
September 20	(Georgia (country)) Telavi, Georgia; Clay $25,000; Singles draw – Doubles draw	(Austria) Melanie Klaffner; 3–6 6–0 3–0 Retired	(Ukraine) Irina Buryachok	(Georgia (country)) Oksana Kalashnikova (Poland) Karolina Kosińska	(Netherlands) Angelique van der Meet (Hungary) Réka-Luca Jani (Belarus) Viktoria Yemialyanava (Ukraine) Alyona Sotnikova
September 20	(Georgia (country)) Telavi, Georgia; Clay $25,000; Singles draw – Doubles draw	(Ukraine) Veronika Kapshay (Romania) Ágnes Szatmári; 6–1 2–6 [10–8]	(Georgia (country)) Oksana Kalashnikova (Austria) Melanie Klaffner	(Georgia (country)) Oksana Kalashnikova (Poland) Karolina Kosińska	(Netherlands) Angelique van der Meet (Hungary) Réka-Luca Jani (Belarus) Viktoria Yemialyanava (Ukraine) Alyona Sotnikova
September 20	Foggia, Italy; Clay $25,000; Singles draw – Doubles draw	(Spain) Laura Pous Tió; 3–6 6–3 6–4	(Spain) María Teresa Torró Flor	(Argentina) Florencia Molinero (Italy) Anna Floris	(Italy) Anna Remondina (Spain) Estrella Cabeza Candela (Argentina) María Irigoyen (Germany) Julia Schruff
September 20	Foggia, Italy; Clay $25,000; Singles draw – Doubles draw	(Argentina) María Irigoyen (Argentina) Florencia Molinero; 6–2 6–2	(Spain) Estrella Cabeza Candela (Spain) Laura Pous Tió	(Argentina) Florencia Molinero (Italy) Anna Floris	(Italy) Anna Remondina (Spain) Estrella Cabeza Candela (Argentina) María Irigoyen (Germany) Julia Schruff
September 20	Bucharest, Romania; Clay $25,000; Singles draw – Doubles draw	(Romania) Mădălina Gojnea; 6–4 6–4	(Slovakia) Kristína Kučová	(Slovakia) Lenka Juríková (Bulgaria) Elitsa Kostova	(Romania) Irina-Camelia Begu (Slovakia) Michaela Pochabová (Romania) Elena Bogdan (Netherlands) Bibiane Schoofs
September 20	Bucharest, Romania; Clay $25,000; Singles draw – Doubles draw	(Romania) Irina-Camelia Begu (Romania) Elena Bogdan; 6–1 6–3	(Spain) Leticia Costas (Spain) Eva Fernández-Brugués	(Slovakia) Lenka Juríková (Bulgaria) Elitsa Kostova	(Romania) Irina-Camelia Begu (Slovakia) Michaela Pochabová (Romania) Elena Bogdan (Netherlands) Bibiane Schoofs
September 20	Novi Sad, Serbia; Clay $10,000; Singles draw – Doubles draw	(Serbia) Ana Jovanović; 6–2 6–3	(Romania) Ingrid-Alexandra Radu	(Slovenia) Nastja Kolar (Serbia) Marina Kačhar	(Czech Republic) Jana Jandová (Serbia) Doroteja Erić (Serbia) Dunja Šunkić (Czech Republic) Martina Kubičíková
September 20	Novi Sad, Serbia; Clay $10,000; Singles draw – Doubles draw	(Czech Republic) Jana Jandová (Czech Republic) Martina Kubičíková; 6–7(4) 6–4 [11–9]	(Belarus) Lidziya Marozava (Russia) Ekaterina Yakovleva	(Slovenia) Nastja Kolar (Serbia) Marina Kačhar	(Czech Republic) Jana Jandová (Serbia) Doroteja Erić (Serbia) Dunja Šunkić (Czech Republic) Martina Kubičíková
September 20	Thessaloniki, Greece; Clay $10,000; Singles draw – Doubles draw	(Russia) Anastasia Mukhametova; 1–6 6–1 6–3	(Turkey) Başak Eraydın	(Israel) Keren Shlomo (United States) Gail Brodsky	(Germany) Bianca Koch (Israel) Chen Astrogo (Russia) Daria Mironova (Germany) Kim Grajdek
September 20	Thessaloniki, Greece; Clay $10,000; Singles draw – Doubles draw	(Germany) Kim Grajdek (Russia) Anastasia Mukhametova; 6–2 6–3	(Israel) Chen Astrogo (Israel) Keren Shlomo	(Israel) Keren Shlomo (United States) Gail Brodsky	(Germany) Bianca Koch (Israel) Chen Astrogo (Russia) Daria Mironova (Germany) Kim Grajdek
September 20	Albuquerque, United States; Hard $75,000; Singles draw – Doubles draw	(Croatia) Mirjana Lučić; 6–1 6–4	(United States) Lindsay Lee-Waters	(United States) Varvara Lepchenko (Georgia (country)) Anna Tatishvili	(United States) Sloane Stephens (Germany) Kathrin Wörle (United States) Kimberly Couts (United States) Ahsha Rolle
September 20	Albuquerque, United States; Hard $75,000; Singles draw – Doubles draw	(United States) Lindsay Lee-Waters (United States) Megan Moulton-Levy; 2–6 6–3 [10–8]	(United States) Abigail Spears (United States) Mashona Washington	(United States) Varvara Lepchenko (Georgia (country)) Anna Tatishvili	(United States) Sloane Stephens (Germany) Kathrin Wörle (United States) Kimberly Couts (United States) Ahsha Rolle
September 20	Saguenay, Quebec, Canada; Hard $50,000; Singles draw – Doubles draw	(Canada) Rebecca Marino; 6–4 6–7(4) 7–6(5)	(United States) Alison Riske	(New Zealand) Marina Erakovic (Canada) Heidi El Tabakh	(Australia) Johanna Konta (France) Séverine Beltrame (United States) Jamie Hampton (Canada) Valérie Tétreault
September 20	Saguenay, Quebec, Canada; Hard $50,000; Singles draw – Doubles draw	(Argentina) Jorgelina Cravero (France) Stéphanie Foretz Gacon; 6–3 6–4	(Canada) Heidi El Tabakh (Canada) Rebecca Marino	(New Zealand) Marina Erakovic (Canada) Heidi El Tabakh	(Australia) Johanna Konta (France) Séverine Beltrame (United States) Jamie Hampton (Canada) Valérie Tétreault
September 20	Alice Springs, Australia; Hard $25,000; Singles draw – Doubles draw	(New Zealand) Sacha Jones; 5–7 6–3 6–3	(Brazil) Ana Clara Duarte	(United Kingdom) Melanie South (Australia) Olivia Rogowska	(Turkey) Pemra Özgen (Australia) Daniella Dominikovic (Australia) Alison Bai (Australia) Bojana Bobusic
September 20	Alice Springs, Australia; Hard $25,000; Singles draw – Doubles draw	(Japan) Erika Sema (Japan) Yurika Sema; 7–5 6–1	(Australia) Alison Bai (Australia) Emelyn Starr	(United Kingdom) Melanie South (Australia) Olivia Rogowska	(Turkey) Pemra Özgen (Australia) Daniella Dominikovic (Australia) Alison Bai (Australia) Bojana Bobusic
September 20	Makinohara, Shizuoka, Japan; Carpet $25,000; Singles draw – Doubles draw	(Japan) Kumiko Iijima; 6–1 6–2	(Japan) Shiho Akita	(Japan) Hiroko Kuwata (Thailand) Nudnida Luangnam	(Japan) Ayumi Oka (Japan) Chinami Ogi (Japan) Maya Kato (Japan) Shuko Aoyama
September 20	Makinohara, Shizuoka, Japan; Carpet $25,000; Singles draw – Doubles draw	(China) Lu Jia Xiang (China) Lu Jia-Jing; 7–5 1–6 [11–9]	(Chinese Taipei) Kao Shao-Yuan (China) Wang Qiang	(Japan) Hiroko Kuwata (Thailand) Nudnida Luangnam	(Japan) Ayumi Oka (Japan) Chinami Ogi (Japan) Maya Kato (Japan) Shuko Aoyama
September 20	Algiers, Algeria; Clay $10,000; Singles draw – Doubles draw	(Morocco) Fatima El Allami; 6–1 6–4	(Czech Republic) Zuzana Linhová	(Italy) Linda Mair (Ukraine) Khristina Kazimova	(Germany) Alina Wessel (United Kingdom) Jennifer Allan (Morocco) Lina Bennani (France) Jennifer Migan
September 20	Algiers, Algeria; Clay $10,000; Singles draw – Doubles draw	(Belgium) Sophie Cornerotte (Netherlands) Marcella Koek; 7–6(3) 6–2	(Ukraine) Khristina Kazimova (Morocco) Nadia Lalami	(Italy) Linda Mair (Ukraine) Khristina Kazimova	(Germany) Alina Wessel (United Kingdom) Jennifer Allan (Morocco) Lina Bennani (France) Jennifer Migan
September 20	Mogi das Cruzes, Brazil; Clay $10,000; Singles draw – Doubles draw	(Brazil) Roxane Vaisemberg; 6–2 6–3	(Argentina) Carla Lucero	(Brazil) Natasha Lotuffo (Brazil) Monique Albuquerque	(Brazil) Maria Fernanda Alves (Argentina) Emilia Yorio (Brazil) Gabriela Cé (Argentina) Catalina Pella
September 20	Mogi das Cruzes, Brazil; Clay $10,000; Singles draw – Doubles draw	(Brazil) Flávia Guimarães Bueno (Brazil) Beatriz Haddad Maia; 6–1 6–3	(Brazil) Maria Fernanda Alves (Brazil) Natasha Lotuffo	(Brazil) Natasha Lotuffo (Brazil) Monique Albuquerque	(Brazil) Maria Fernanda Alves (Argentina) Emilia Yorio (Brazil) Gabriela Cé (Argentina) Catalina Pella
September 20	Mazatlán, Mexico; Hard $10,000; Singles draw – Doubles draw	(Mexico) Nazari Urbina; 6–4 6–3	(United States) Yasmin Schnack	(United States) Nadia Echeverria Alam (United States) Whitney Jones	(Canada) Monica Neveklovska (United States) Yawna Allen (Mexico) Carolina Betancourt (Argentina) Andrea Benítez
September 20	Mazatlán, Mexico; Hard $10,000; Singles draw – Doubles draw	(United States) Ivana King (United States) Yasmin Schnack; 6–4 3–6 [10–5]	(United States) Yawna Allen (Canada) Monica Neveklovska	(United States) Nadia Echeverria Alam (United States) Whitney Jones	(Canada) Monica Neveklovska (United States) Yawna Allen (Mexico) Carolina Betancourt (Argentina) Andrea Benítez
September 20	Caracas, Venezuela; Hard $10,000; Singles draw – Doubles draw	(Venezuela) Andrea Gámiz; 1–6 6–4 7–5	(Venezuela) Adriana Pérez	(Belgium) Gally De Wael (Austria) Nicole Rottmann	(Argentina) Guadalupe Moreno (Colombia) Maria Paula Ribero (Venezuela) Gabriela Coglitore (Trinidad and Tobago) Yolande Leacock
September 20	Caracas, Venezuela; Hard $10,000; Singles draw – Doubles draw	(Belgium) Gally De Wael (Austria) Nicole Rottmann; 6–0 6–1	(Argentina) Mikele Irazusta (Colombia) Maria Paula Ribero	(Belgium) Gally De Wael (Austria) Nicole Rottmann	(Argentina) Guadalupe Moreno (Colombia) Maria Paula Ribero (Venezuela) Gabriela Coglitore (Trinidad and Tobago) Yolande Leacock
September 27	Athens, Greece; Hard $50,000; Singles draw – Doubles draw	(Greece) Eleni Daniilidou; 6–4 6–1	(Spain) Laura Pous Tió	(Croatia) Petra Martić (Slovakia) Zuzana Kučová	(Germany) Kristina Barrois (Bulgaria) Dia Evtimova (Spain) María Teresa Torró Flor (Czech Republic) Karolína Plíšková
September 27	Athens, Greece; Hard $50,000; Singles draw – Doubles draw	(Russia) Vitalia Diatchenko (Turkey) İpek Şenoğlu; Walkover	(Greece) Eleni Daniilidou (Croatia) Petra Martić	(Croatia) Petra Martić (Slovakia) Zuzana Kučová	(Germany) Kristina Barrois (Bulgaria) Dia Evtimova (Spain) María Teresa Torró Flor (Czech Republic) Karolína Plíšková
September 27	Clermont-Ferrand, France; Hard $25,000; Singles draw – Doubles draw	(Croatia) Ivana Lisjak; 6–4 6–1	(Belarus) Iryna Kuryanovich	(Czech Republic) Petra Cetkovská (France) Audrey Bergot	(Poland) Patrycja Sanduska (France) Claire de Gubernatis (France) Alizé Lim (Russia) Natalia Orlova
September 27	Clermont-Ferrand, France; Hard $25,000; Singles draw – Doubles draw	(France) Youlia Fedossova (Belarus) Iryna Kuryanovich; 7–6(5) 6–3	(France) Elixane Lechemia (France) Alizé Lim	(Czech Republic) Petra Cetkovská (France) Audrey Bergot	(Poland) Patrycja Sanduska (France) Claire de Gubernatis (France) Alizé Lim (Russia) Natalia Orlova
September 27	(Georgia (country)) Tbilisi, Georgia; Clay $25,000; Singles draw – Doubles draw	(Georgia (country)) Margalita Chakhnashvili; 6–4 3–6 7–5	(Georgia (country)) Tatia Mikadze	(Hungary) Réka-Luca Jani (Georgia (country)) Sofia Shapatava	(Georgia (country)) Oksana Kalashnikova (Belarus) Aliaksandra Sasnovich (Ukraine) Veronika Kapshay (Israel) Julia Glushko
September 27	(Georgia (country)) Tbilisi, Georgia; Clay $25,000; Singles draw – Doubles draw	(Georgia (country)) Tatia Mikadze (Georgia (country)) Sofia Shapatava; 6–3 6–2	(Poland) Paula Kania (Hungary) Zsófia Susányi	(Hungary) Réka-Luca Jani (Georgia (country)) Sofia Shapatava	(Georgia (country)) Oksana Kalashnikova (Belarus) Aliaksandra Sasnovich (Ukraine) Veronika Kapshay (Israel) Julia Glushko
September 27	Helsinki, Finland; Hard $25,000; Singles draw – Doubles draw	(Ukraine) Yuliya Beygelzimer; 7–6(7) 6–0	(Finland) Emma Laine	(Slovakia) Jana Čepelová (Netherlands) Kiki Bertens	(Russia) Elena Chalova (Germany) Nicola Geuer (France) Kristina Mladenovic (United Kingdom) Tara Moore
September 27	Helsinki, Finland; Hard $25,000; Singles draw – Doubles draw	(Netherlands) Kiki Bertens (Netherlands) Richèl Hogenkamp; 6–3 7–5	(Ukraine) Yuliya Beygelzimer (France) Kristina Mladenovic	(Slovakia) Jana Čepelová (Netherlands) Kiki Bertens	(Russia) Elena Chalova (Germany) Nicola Geuer (France) Kristina Mladenovic (United Kingdom) Tara Moore
September 27	Bucha, Ukraine; Clay $25,000; Singles draw – Doubles draw	(Ukraine) Valentyna Ivakhnenko; 6–2 2–0 Retired	(Ukraine) Oksana Lyubtsova	(Russia) Yuliya Kalabina (Ukraine) Ganna Piven	(Belarus) Polina Pekhova (Kyrgyzstan) Ksenia Palkina (Kyrgyzstan) Bermet Duvanaeva (Russia) Daria Kuchmina
September 27	Bucha, Ukraine; Clay $25,000; Singles draw – Doubles draw	(Russia) Yuliya Kalabina (Russia) Tatiana Kotelnikova; 6–4 7–5	(Ukraine) Valentyna Ivakhnenko (Ukraine) Anastasiya Lytovchenko	(Russia) Yuliya Kalabina (Ukraine) Ganna Piven	(Belarus) Polina Pekhova (Kyrgyzstan) Ksenia Palkina (Kyrgyzstan) Bermet Duvanaeva (Russia) Daria Kuchmina
September 27	Porto, Portugal; Clay $10,000; Singles draw – Doubles draw	(United States) Gail Brodsky; 7–5 6–1	(Germany) Karolina Nowak	(Spain) Olga Sáez Larra (Germany) Lena-Marie Hofmann	(Portugal) Rita Vilaca (Spain) Rocío de la Torre-Sánchez (Spain) Arabela Fernández Rabener (United States) Samantha Powers
September 27	Porto, Portugal; Clay $10,000; Singles draw – Doubles draw	(Norway) Ulrikke Eikeri (Germany) Lena-Marie Hofmann; 7–6 6–7 [10–5]	(United States) Gail Brodsky (United States) Alexandra Riley	(Spain) Olga Sáez Larra (Germany) Lena-Marie Hofmann	(Portugal) Rita Vilaca (Spain) Rocío de la Torre-Sánchez (Spain) Arabela Fernández Rabener (United States) Samantha Powers
September 27	Ciampino, Italy; Clay $10,000; Singles draw – Doubles draw	(Italy) Martina Caregaro; 6–3 6–3	(Romania) Diana Enache	(Italy) Gioia Barbieri (Bulgaria) Martina Gledacheva	(Italy) Martina Di Giuseppe (Italy) Francesca Mazzali (Germany) Anne Schäfer (Italy) Giulia Gabba
September 27	Ciampino, Italy; Clay $10,000; Singles draw – Doubles draw	(Romania) Diana Enache (Italy) Valentina Sulpizio; 6–4 6–4	(Italy) Stefania Chieppa (Bulgaria) Martina Gledacheva	(Italy) Gioia Barbieri (Bulgaria) Martina Gledacheva	(Italy) Martina Di Giuseppe (Italy) Francesca Mazzali (Germany) Anne Schäfer (Italy) Giulia Gabba
September 27	Antalya, Turkey; Clay $10,000; Singles draw – Doubles draw	(Russia) Viktoria Kamenskaya; 6–3 6–0	(Czech Republic) Zuzana Zálabská	(France) Émilie Bacquet (Italy) Verdiana Verardi	(Lithuania) Joana Eidukonytė (Poland) Veronika Domagala (Czech Republic) Martina Kubičíková (Russia) Ksenia Kirillova
September 27	Antalya, Turkey; Clay $10,000; Singles draw – Doubles draw	(Russia) Viktoria Kamenskaya (Russia) Ksenia Kirillova; 6–7(10) 6–3 [10–3]	(Italy) Giulia Gasparri (Italy) Verdiana Verardi	(France) Émilie Bacquet (Italy) Verdiana Verardi	(Lithuania) Joana Eidukonytė (Poland) Veronika Domagala (Czech Republic) Martina Kubičíková (Russia) Ksenia Kirillova
September 27	Ningbo, China; Hard $100,000+H; Singles draw – Doubles draw	(Italy) Alberta Brianti; 6–4 6–4	(Slovakia) Magdaléna Rybáriková	(China) Zhang Shuai (China) Han Xinyun	(Thailand) Noppawan Lertcheewakarn (Australia) Sophie Ferguson (United States) Jill Craybas (China) Zhou Yi-Miao
September 27	Ningbo, China; Hard $100,000+H; Singles draw – Doubles draw	(Chinese Taipei) Chan Chin-wei (Chinese Taipei) Chen Yi; 6–3 3–6 [10–8]	(United States) Jill Craybas (Ukraine) Olga Savchuk	(China) Zhang Shuai (China) Han Xinyun	(Thailand) Noppawan Lertcheewakarn (Australia) Sophie Ferguson (United States) Jill Craybas (China) Zhou Yi-Miao
September 27	Las Vegas, United States; Hard $50,000; Singles draw – Doubles draw	(United States) Varvara Lepchenko; 6–2 6–2	(Romania) Sorana Cîrstea	(Romania) Edina Gallovits (Croatia) Mirjana Lučić	(Canada) Valérie Tétreault (United States) Lauren Albanese (United States) Abigail Spears (Georgia (country)) Anna Tatishvili
September 27	Las Vegas, United States; Hard $50,000; Singles draw – Doubles draw	(United States) Lindsay Lee-Waters (United States) Megan Moulton-Levy; 1–6 7–5 [10–4]	(United States) Irina Falconi (United States) Maria Sanchez	(Romania) Edina Gallovits (Croatia) Mirjana Lučić	(Canada) Valérie Tétreault (United States) Lauren Albanese (United States) Abigail Spears (Georgia (country)) Anna Tatishvili
September 27	Hamanako, Japan; Carpet $25,000; Singles draw – Doubles draw	(Japan) Kumiko Iijima; 6–7(4) 6–2 6–4	(Japan) Erika Sema	(Thailand) Nudnida Luangnam (Ukraine) Tetiana Luzhanska	(South Korea) Han Sung-hee (Japan) Ayaka Maekawa (China) Wang Qiang (Chinese Taipei) Hsu Wen-hsin
September 27	Hamanako, Japan; Carpet $25,000; Singles draw – Doubles draw	(Japan) Kumiko Iijima (Japan) Erika Sema; 6–2 6–1	(Chinese Taipei) Kao Shao-Yuan (Japan) Ayaka Maekawa	(Thailand) Nudnida Luangnam (Ukraine) Tetiana Luzhanska	(South Korea) Han Sung-hee (Japan) Ayaka Maekawa (China) Wang Qiang (Chinese Taipei) Hsu Wen-hsin
September 27	Amelia Island, United States; Clay $10,000; Singles draw – Doubles draw	(United States) Lauren Herring; 6–2 6–3	(United States) Catherine Harrison	(Russia) Olga Puchkova (United States) Madison Keys	(United States) Gabrielle Desimone (Ukraine) Anastasia Kharchenko (United States) Anna Mamalat (United States) Jan Abaza
September 27	Amelia Island, United States; Clay $10,000; Singles draw – Doubles draw	(United States) Elizabeth Lumpkin (United States) Story Tweedie-Yates; 7–5 6–4	(United States) Alexandra M. Haney (United States) Kendal Woodard	(Russia) Olga Puchkova (United States) Madison Keys	(United States) Gabrielle Desimone (Ukraine) Anastasia Kharchenko (United States) Anna Mamalat (United States) Jan Abaza
September 27	Arujá, Brazil; Clay $10,000; Singles draw – Doubles draw	(Brazil) Teliana Pereira; 4–6 6–4 6–1	(Argentina) Vanesa Furlanetto	(Brazil) Carla Forte (Brazil) Monique Albuquerque	(Argentina) Emilia Yorio (Argentina) Catalina Pella (Brazil) Roxane Vaisemberg (Brazil) Maria Fernanda Alves
September 27	Arujá, Brazil; Clay $10,000; Singles draw – Doubles draw	(Argentina) Carla Lucero (Argentina) Emilia Yorio; 6–4 4–6 [10–8]	(Colombia) Karen Castiblanco (Argentina) Vanesa Furlanetto	(Brazil) Carla Forte (Brazil) Monique Albuquerque	(Argentina) Emilia Yorio (Argentina) Catalina Pella (Brazil) Roxane Vaisemberg (Brazil) Maria Fernanda Alves
September 27	Algiers, Algeria; Clay $10,000; Singles draw – Doubles draw	(Netherlands) Marcella Koek; 6–4 6–4	(Morocco) Fatima El Allami	(Czech Republic) Zuzana Linhová (Croatia) Silvia Njirić	(Switzerland) Ladina Soler (Austria) Stephanie Hirsch (United Kingdom) Jennifer Allan (Morocco) Nadia Lalami
September 27	Algiers, Algeria; Clay $10,000; Singles draw – Doubles draw	(Morocco) Fatima El Allami (Netherlands) Marcella Koek; 6–0 6–1	(Ukraine) Khristina Kazimova (Morocco) Nadia Lalami	(Czech Republic) Zuzana Linhová (Croatia) Silvia Njirić	(Switzerland) Ladina Soler (Austria) Stephanie Hirsch (United Kingdom) Jennifer Allan (Morocco) Nadia Lalami
September 27	Jakarta, Indonesia; Hard $10,000; Singles draw – Doubles draw	(Indonesia) Sandy Gumulya; 6–3 6–0	(New Zealand) Katherine Westbury	(Indonesia) Grace Sari Ysidora (Thailand) Peangtarn Plipuech	(Indonesia) Ayu Fani Damayanti (Indonesia) Voni Darlina (South Korea) Kim Hae-Sung (Indonesia) Jessy Rompies
September 27	Jakarta, Indonesia; Hard $10,000; Singles draw – Doubles draw	(Indonesia) Ayu Fani Damayanti (Indonesia) Jessy Rompies; 6–0 6–0	(Thailand) Peangtarn Plipuech (Indonesia) Laili Rahmawati Ulfa	(Indonesia) Grace Sari Ysidora (Thailand) Peangtarn Plipuech	(Indonesia) Ayu Fani Damayanti (Indonesia) Voni Darlina (South Korea) Kim Hae-Sung (Indonesia) Jessy Rompies
September 27	Celaya, Mexico; Clay $10,000; Singles draw – Doubles draw	(Argentina) Andrea Benítez; 6–0 1–1 Retired	(United States) Elizabeth Ferris	(United States) Nicole Robinson (Switzerland) Stephanie Theiler	(United States) Noel Scott (Mexico) Alina Sullivan (Japan) Tomoko Dokei (Austria) Christine Kandler
September 27	Celaya, Mexico; Clay $10,000; Singles draw – Doubles draw	(Japan) Tomoko Dokei (Japan) Hiromi Okazaki; 3–6 6–3 [10–7]	(United States) Elizabeth Ferris (United States) Nicole Robinson	(United States) Nicole Robinson (Switzerland) Stephanie Theiler	(United States) Noel Scott (Mexico) Alina Sullivan (Japan) Tomoko Dokei (Austria) Christine Kandler

== See also ==
- 2010 ITF Women's Circuit
- 2010 ITF Women's Circuit (January–March)
- 2010 ITF Women's Circuit (April–June)
- 2010 ITF Women's Circuit (October–December)
- 2010 WTA Tour
