= Liu Shaozhuo =

Chinese tennis player

- Country (sports): China
- Born: 31 October 1990 (age 34); Tianjin, China
- Plays: Left-handed
- Prize money: $31,988

Singles
- Career titles: 1 ITF
- Highest ranking: No. 434 (16 August 2010)

Doubles
- Career titles: ITF
- Highest ranking: No. 389 (27 October 2008)

Liu Shaozhuo (born 31 October 1990) is a Chinese former professional tennis player.

A left-handed player born in Tianjin, Liu reached a best singles ranking of 434 in the world and won an ITF title in Manila in 2009. She won a further ITF title in 2010 as a doubles player, a $25,000 tournament in Fuzhou, partnering Xu Yifan.

Liu made her only WTA Tour main draw appearance at the 2010 Guangzhou International Women's Open, where she and Chinese Taipei's Chen Yi were beaten in the first round by Olga Savchuk and Tamarine Tanasugarn, in a match tiebreak.

== ITF finals ==
$25,000 tournaments
$10,000 tournaments

=== Singles: 1 (1–0) ===
Outcome	Date	Tournament	Surface	Opponent	Score
Winner	16 November 2009	Manila, Philippines	Hard	(South Korea) Han Sung-hee	6–1, 6–2

=== Doubles: 1 (1–0) ===
Outcome	Date	Tournament	Surface	Partner	Opponents	Score
Winner	9 July 2010	Fuzhou, China	Hard	(China) Xu Yifan	(Chinese Taipei) Kao Shao-yuan (Japan) Ayaka Maekawa	3–6, 6–1, [10–2]
