= Monique Albuquerque =

Brazilian tennis player

- Country (sports): Brazil
- Born: 11 September 1991 (age 35) Porto Alegre, Brazil
- Plays: Right-handed
- College: University of Miami
- Prize money: $17,839

Singles
- Highest ranking: No. 490 (6 June 2011)

Doubles
- Career titles: 6 ITF
- Highest ranking: No. 315 (6 June 2011)

Monique Albuquerque (born 11 September 1991) is a Brazilian former professional tennis player.

A right-handed player from Porto Alegre, Albuquerque represented the Brazil Cup team in a total of four ties, across 2009 and 2010. All of her appearances were in the doubles rubbers partnering Roxane Vaisemberg, with the pair winning three of their four matches together. She played on the professional tour until 2011, securing six ITF doubles titles.

From 2013 to 2015, she played varsity tennis for the Miami Hurricanes at the University of Miami.

== ITF finals ==
Legend
$25,000 tournaments
$10,000 tournaments

=== Doubles (6–8) ===
Outcome	No.	Date	Location	Surface	Partner	Opponents	Score
Runner-up	1.	6 October 2008	Mogi das Cruzes, Brazil	Clay	(Brazil) Paula Cristina Gonçalves	(Colombia) Karen Castiblanco (Argentina) Aranza Salut	3–6, 1–6
Runner-up	2.	27 July 2009	Campos do Jordão, Brazil	Clay	(Brazil) Paula Cristina Gonçalves	(Brazil) Larissa Carvalho (Brazil) Vivian Segnini	6–3, 1–6, [7–10]
Winner	1.	29 August 2009	Barueri, Brazil	Hard	(Brazil) Roxane Vaisemberg	(Argentina) Mailen Auroux (Brazil) Fernanda Hermenegildo	7–6^{(9–7)}, 7–5
Runner-up	3.	17 October 2009	Bauru, Brazil	Clay	(Brazil) Roxane Vaisemberg	(Argentina) Veronica Spiegel (Argentina) Emilia Yorio	4–6, 3–6
Winner	2.	24 October 2009	Belo Horizonte, Brazil	Clay	(Brazil) Roxane Vaisemberg	(Argentina) Veronica Spiegel (Argentina) Emilia Yorio	6–7^{(4–7)}, 6–1, [14–12]
Runner-up	4.	23 July 2010	Brasília, Brazil	Hard	(Brazil) Roxane Vaisemberg	(Brazil) Ana Clara Duarte (Brazil) Fernanda Hermenegildo	2–6, 4–6
Runner-up	5.	31 July 2010	Campos do Jordão, Brazil	Hard	(Brazil) Roxane Vaisemberg	(Brazil) Fernanda Faria (Brazil) Paula Cristina Gonçalves	3–6, 2–6
Winner	3.	8 August 2010	Brasília, Brazil	Hard	(Brazil) Fernanda Hermenegildo	(Brazil) Fernanda Faria (Brazil) Paula Cristina Gonçalves	7–6^{(7–5)}, 6–4
Winner	4.	18 September 2010	Itapema, Brazil	Clay	(Brazil) Roxane Vaisemberg	(Brazil) Maria Fernanda Alves (Brazil) Natalia Cheng	6–3, 6–3
Winner	5.	15 October 2010	São Paulo, Brazil	Clay	(Brazil) Vivian Segnini	(Brazil) Nathália Rossi (Argentina) Barbara Rush	6–4, 6–4
Runner-up	6.	20 November 2010	Niterói, Brazil	Clay	(Brazil) Fernanda Hermenegildo	(Brazil) Maria Fernanda Alves (Brazil) Ana Clara Duarte	4–6, 4–6
Runner-up	7.	1 April 2011	Ribeirão Preto, Brazil	Clay	(Brazil) Isabela Miró	(Brazil) Gabriela Cé (Russia) Irina Khromacheva	2–6, 4–6
Winner	6.	27 May 2011	Itaparica, Brazil	Hard	(Argentina) Aranza Salut	(Brazil) Roxane Vaisemberg (Brazil) Vivian Segnini	6–3, 4–6, [11–9]
Runner-up	8.	27 June 2011	São José dos Campos, Brazil	Clay	(Brazil) Fernanda Faria	(Brazil) Carla Forte (Brazil) Maria Fernanda Alves	4–6, 6–0, 4–6
