= 2010 ITF Women's Circuit (October–December) =

This is the October–December part of the 2010 ITF Women's Circuit.

== Key ==
$100,000 tournaments
$75,000 tournaments
$50,000 tournaments
$25,000 tournaments
$10,000 tournaments

== October ==
Week of	Tournament	Winner	Runners-up	Semifinalists	Quarterfinalists
October 4	Tokyo, Japan; Hard $100,000+H; Singles draw – Doubles draw	(Japan) Ayumi Morita; 6–3 7–5	(United States) Jill Craybas	(Japan) Misaki Doi (Slovakia) Magdaléna Rybáriková	(Ukraine) Olga Savchuk (Italy) Alberta Brianti (France) Séverine Beltrame (France) Julie Coin
October 4	Tokyo, Japan; Hard $100,000+H; Singles draw – Doubles draw	(United States) Jill Craybas (Thailand) Tamarine Tanasugarn; 6–3 6–1	(Poland) Urszula Radwańska (Ukraine) Olga Savchuk	(Japan) Misaki Doi (Slovakia) Magdaléna Rybáriková	(Ukraine) Olga Savchuk (Italy) Alberta Brianti (France) Séverine Beltrame (France) Julie Coin
October 4	Barnstaple, United Kingdom; Hard $75,000; Singles draw – Doubles draw	(United States) Alison Riske; 6–2 6–0	(Sweden) Johanna Larsson	(Russia) Ksenia Pervak (Czech Republic) Andrea Hlaváčková	(France) Pauline Parmentier (Germany) Mona Barthel (Belarus) Anastasiya Yakimova (Netherlands) Richèl Hogenkamp
October 4	Barnstaple, United Kingdom; Hard $75,000; Singles draw – Doubles draw	(Czech Republic) Andrea Hlaváčková (Netherlands) Michaëlla Krajicek; 7–6(4) 6–2	(Austria) Sandra Klemenschits (Germany) Tatjana Malek	(Russia) Ksenia Pervak (Czech Republic) Andrea Hlaváčková	(France) Pauline Parmentier (Germany) Mona Barthel (Belarus) Anastasiya Yakimova (Netherlands) Richèl Hogenkamp
October 4	Madrid, Spain; Clay $50,000; Singles draw – Doubles draw	(Romania) Elena Bogdan; 6–4 6–2	(Spain) Leticia Costas	(Italy) Anna Remondina (Germany) Julia Schruff	(Romania) Elora Dabija (Serbia) Aleksandra Krunić (Spain) Eva Fernández Brugués (Switzerland) Conny Perrin
October 4	Madrid, Spain; Clay $50,000; Singles draw – Doubles draw	(Spain) Lara Arruabarrena Vecino (Spain) María Teresa Torró Flor; 6–4 7–5	(Romania) Irina-Camelia Begu (Romania) Elena Bogdan	(Italy) Anna Remondina (Germany) Julia Schruff	(Romania) Elora Dabija (Serbia) Aleksandra Krunić (Spain) Eva Fernández Brugués (Switzerland) Conny Perrin
October 4	Kansas City, United States; Hard $50,000; Singles draw – Doubles draw	(Canada) Rebecca Marino; 6–7(4–7) 6–0 6–2	(Romania) Edina Gallovits	(United States) Irina Falconi (Germany) Kathrin Wörle	(United States) Lindsay Lee-Waters (Venezuela) Gabriela Paz (United States) Lauren Albanese (United States) Julie Ditty
October 4	Kansas City, United States; Hard $50,000; Singles draw – Doubles draw	(United States) Julie Ditty (United States) Abigail Spears; 6–2 4–6 [10-3]	(United States) Lauren Albanese (United States) Irina Falconi	(United States) Irina Falconi (Germany) Kathrin Wörle	(United States) Lindsay Lee-Waters (Venezuela) Gabriela Paz (United States) Lauren Albanese (United States) Julie Ditty
October 4	Port Pirie, Australia; Hard $25,000; Singles draw – Doubles draw	(Japan) Erika Sema; 6–1 4–6 6–3	(France) Victoria Larrière	(Australia) Marija Mirkovic (United Kingdom) Melanie South	(Russia) Arina Rodionova (Australia) Sophie Letcher (Turkey) Pemra Özgen (Japan) Remi Tezuka
October 4	Port Pirie, Australia; Hard $25,000; Singles draw – Doubles draw	(Australia) Bojana Bobusic (Australia) Alenka Hubacek; 6–3 6–2	(United Kingdom) Melanie South (Japan) Remi Tezuka	(Australia) Marija Mirkovic (United Kingdom) Melanie South	(Russia) Arina Rodionova (Australia) Sophie Letcher (Turkey) Pemra Özgen (Japan) Remi Tezuka
October 4	Limoges, France; Hard $25,000; Singles draw – Doubles draw	(Croatia) Ivana Lisjak; 6–0 6–3	(Ukraine) Yulia Beygelzimer	(France) Caroline Garcia (Italy) Julia Mayr	(France) Claire Feuerstein (Ukraine) Nadiya Kichenok (France) Audrey Bergot (Ukraine) Lyudmyla Kichenok
October 4	Limoges, France; Hard $25,000; Singles draw – Doubles draw	(Ukraine) Lyudmyla Kichenok (Ukraine) Nadiya Kichenok; 6–7(5) 6–4 [10-8]	(France) Claire Feuerstein (France) Caroline Garcia	(France) Caroline Garcia (Italy) Julia Mayr	(France) Claire Feuerstein (Ukraine) Nadiya Kichenok (France) Audrey Bergot (Ukraine) Lyudmyla Kichenok
October 4	Antalya, Turkey; Clay $10,000; Singles draw – Doubles draw	(Russia) Viktoria Kamenskaya; 6–4 6–0	(Slovakia) Karin Morgošová	(Slovakia) Chantal Škamlová (Czech Republic) Zuzana Zálabská	(Uzbekistan) Vlada Ekshibarova (Romania) Cristina Dinu (Italy) Verdiana Verardi (Netherlands) Lesley Kerkhove
October 4	Antalya, Turkey; Clay $10,000; Singles draw – Doubles draw	(Russia) Viktoria Kamenskaya (Belarus) Anna Orlik; 7–6(7) 6–4	(Slovakia) Chantal Škamlová (Czech Republic) Monika Tůmová	(Slovakia) Chantal Škamlová (Czech Republic) Zuzana Zálabská	(Uzbekistan) Vlada Ekshibarova (Romania) Cristina Dinu (Italy) Verdiana Verardi (Netherlands) Lesley Kerkhove
October 4	Espinho, Portugal; Clay $10,000; Singles draw – Doubles draw	(Norway) Ulrikke Eikeri; 6–0, 6–0	(France) Alice Tisset	(France) Morgane Pons (Germany) Bianca Koch	(Germany) Lena-Marie Hofmann (Germany) Karolina Nowak (Spain) Arabela Fernández Rabener (Spain) Sandra Soler-Sola
October 4	Espinho, Portugal; Clay $10,000; Singles draw – Doubles draw	(Norway) Ulrikke Eikeri (Germany) Lena-Marie Hofmann; 6–3 6–1	(Portugal) Barbara Luz (United States) Samantha Powers	(France) Morgane Pons (Germany) Bianca Koch	(Germany) Lena-Marie Hofmann (Germany) Karolina Nowak (Spain) Arabela Fernández Rabener (Spain) Sandra Soler-Sola
October 4	Dobrich, Bulgaria; Clay $10,000; Singles draw – Doubles draw	(Montenegro) Danka Kovinić; 6–4 6–3	(Bulgaria) Isabella Shinikova	(Bulgaria) Nadejda Vassileva (Serbia) Natalija Koštić	(Bulgaria) Nikol Hristova (Italy) Federica Grazioso (Romania) Claudia-Gianina Dumitrescu (Romania) Ingrid-Alexandra Radu
October 4	Dobrich, Bulgaria; Clay $10,000; Singles draw – Doubles draw	(Romania) Camelia Hristea (Romania) Ionela-Andreea Iova; 6–0 2–6 [10–6]	(Bulgaria) Huliya Velieva (Bulgaria) Lütfiye Esen	(Bulgaria) Nadejda Vassileva (Serbia) Natalija Koštić	(Bulgaria) Nikol Hristova (Italy) Federica Grazioso (Romania) Claudia-Gianina Dumitrescu (Romania) Ingrid-Alexandra Radu
October 4	Cagliari, Italy; Clay $10,000; Singles draw – Doubles draw	(Germany) Anne Schäfer; 6–2 6–2	(Italy) Francesca Mazzali	(Italy) Carolina Pillot (Italy) Valentina Sulpizio	(Germany) Carina Witthöft (Netherlands) Eva Wacanno (Slovenia) Anja Prislan (Italy) Erika Zanchetta
October 4	Cagliari, Italy; Clay $10,000; Singles draw – Doubles draw	(Italy) Elisa Salis (Italy) Valentina Sulpizio; Walkover	(Denmark) Mai Grage (Netherlands) Eva Wacanno	(Italy) Carolina Pillot (Italy) Valentina Sulpizio	(Germany) Carina Witthöft (Netherlands) Eva Wacanno (Slovenia) Anja Prislan (Italy) Erika Zanchetta
October 4	Jakarta, Indonesia; Hard $10,000; Singles draw – Doubles draw	(Indonesia) Sandy Gumulya; 6–2 6–2	(China) Yang Zi	(South Korea) Hong Seung-yeon (Indonesia) Grace Sari Ysidora	(India) Kanika Vaidya (Indonesia) Voni Darlina (Indonesia) Cynthia Melita (Indonesia) Aldila Sutjiadi
October 4	Jakarta, Indonesia; Hard $10,000; Singles draw – Doubles draw	(Indonesia) Sandy Gumulya (Japan) Moe Kawatoko; 7–6(3) 7–5	(Chinese Taipei) Chan Hao-ching (China) He Sirui	(South Korea) Hong Seung-yeon (Indonesia) Grace Sari Ysidora	(India) Kanika Vaidya (Indonesia) Voni Darlina (Indonesia) Cynthia Melita (Indonesia) Aldila Sutjiadi
October 4	Nonthaburi, Thailand; Hard $10,000; Singles draw – Doubles draw	(Thailand) Nungnadda Wannasuk; 6–4 6–1	(China) Zhu Lin	(Thailand) Luksika Kumkhum (Thailand) Nicha Lertpitaksinchai	(Thailand) Varatchaya Wongteanchai (Japan) Yurina Koshino (Chinese Taipei) Chen Yi (Japan) Chinami Ogi
October 4	Nonthaburi, Thailand; Hard $10,000; Singles draw – Doubles draw	(Thailand) Peangtarn Plipuech (Thailand) Nungnadda Wannasuk; 7–5 6–7(4) [11-9]	(Chinese Taipei) Chen Yi (Thailand) Varatchaya Wongteanchai	(Thailand) Luksika Kumkhum (Thailand) Nicha Lertpitaksinchai	(Thailand) Varatchaya Wongteanchai (Japan) Yurina Koshino (Chinese Taipei) Chen Yi (Japan) Chinami Ogi
October 4	Londrina, Brazil; Clay $10,000; Singles draw – Doubles draw	(Brazil) Teliana Pereira; 6–4 6–0	(Paraguay) Verónica Cepede Royg	(Argentina) Vanesa Furlanetto (Argentina) Catalina Pella	(Argentina) Aranza Salut (Ecuador) Marie Elise Casares (Brazil) Nathalia Rossi (Brazil) Fernanda Hermenegildo
October 4	Londrina, Brazil; Clay $10,000; Singles draw – Doubles draw	(Colombia) Karen Castiblanco (Chile) Camila Silva; 6–4 6–3	(Paraguay) Verónica Cepede Royg (Brazil) Vivian Segnini	(Argentina) Vanesa Furlanetto (Argentina) Catalina Pella	(Argentina) Aranza Salut (Ecuador) Marie Elise Casares (Brazil) Nathalia Rossi (Brazil) Fernanda Hermenegildo
October 4	Mexico City, Mexico; Hard $10,000; Singles draw – Doubles draw	(United States) Yasmin Schnack; 6–3 6–1	(Argentina) Andrea Benítez	(United States) Elizabeth Ferris (Mexico) Carolina Betancourt	(Mexico) Melissa Torres Sandoval (Japan) Tomoko Dokei (Mexico) Giovanna Manifacio (United States) Ivana King
October 4	Mexico City, Mexico; Hard $10,000; Singles draw – Doubles draw	(United States) Ivana King (United States) Yasmin Schnack; 6–7(2) 6–3 [10–7]	(United States) Elizabeth Ferris (United States) Nicole Robinson	(United States) Elizabeth Ferris (Mexico) Carolina Betancourt	(Mexico) Melissa Torres Sandoval (Japan) Tomoko Dokei (Mexico) Giovanna Manifacio (United States) Ivana King
October 4	Algiers, Algeria; Clay $10,000; Singles draw – Doubles draw	(Croatia) Silvia Njirić; 3–6 6–3 6–1	(Morocco) Fatima El Allami	(Italy) Silvia Albano (Russia) Ekaterina Nikitina	(Netherlands) Marcella Koek (Morocco) Lina Bennani (France) Amandine Cazeaux (France) Jennifer Migan
October 4	Algiers, Algeria; Clay $10,000; Singles draw – Doubles draw	(Morocco) Fatima El Allami (Netherlands) Marcella Koek; 6–4 6–3	(Belgium) Sophie Cornerotte (France) Jennifer Migan	(Italy) Silvia Albano (Russia) Ekaterina Nikitina	(Netherlands) Marcella Koek (Morocco) Lina Bennani (France) Amandine Cazeaux (France) Jennifer Migan
October 4	Williamsburg, United States; Clay $10,000; Singles draw – Doubles draw	(United States) Lauren Davis; 6–0 6–0	(Latvia) Līga Dekmeijere	(Russia) Angelina Gabueva (United States) Anna Mamalat	(United States) Brittany Augustine (Poland) Paulina Bigos (United States) Chanelle van Nguyen (United States) Lauren Herring
October 4	Williamsburg, United States; Clay $10,000; Singles draw – Doubles draw	(Russia) Angelina Gabueva (Bulgaria) Svetlana Krivencheva; 6–4 3–6 [10-8]	(Georgia (country)) Salome Devidze (Georgia (country)) Magda Okruashvili	(Russia) Angelina Gabueva (United States) Anna Mamalat	(United States) Brittany Augustine (Poland) Paulina Bigos (United States) Chanelle van Nguyen (United States) Lauren Herring
October 11	Torhout, Belgium; Hard $100,000+H; Singles draw – Doubles draw	(Belgium) Yanina Wickmayer; 6–3 6–2	(Romania) Simona Halep	(Czech Republic) Andrea Hlaváčková (Switzerland) Timea Bacsinszky	(Germany) Mona Barthel (Croatia) Karolina Šprem (Netherlands) Kiki Bertens (Netherlands) Arantxa Rus
October 11	Torhout, Belgium; Hard $100,000+H; Singles draw – Doubles draw	(Switzerland) Timea Bacsinszky (Italy) Tathiana Garbin; 6–4 6–2	(Netherlands) Michaëlla Krajicek (Belgium) Yanina Wickmayer	(Czech Republic) Andrea Hlaváčková (Switzerland) Timea Bacsinszky	(Germany) Mona Barthel (Croatia) Karolina Šprem (Netherlands) Kiki Bertens (Netherlands) Arantxa Rus
October 11	Troy, United States; Hard $50,000; Singles draw – Doubles draw	(Canada) Rebecca Marino; 6–1 6–2	(United States) Ashley Weinhold	(United States) Alexis King (United States) Irina Falconi	(United States) Ahsha Rolle (Germany) Laura Siegemund (Canada) Sharon Fichman (United States) Lindsay Lee-Waters
October 11	Troy, United States; Hard $50,000; Singles draw – Doubles draw	(United States) Madison Brengle (United States) Asia Muhammed; 6–2 6–4	(Russia) Alina Jidkova (Germany) Laura Siegemund	(United States) Alexis King (United States) Irina Falconi	(United States) Ahsha Rolle (Germany) Laura Siegemund (Canada) Sharon Fichman (United States) Lindsay Lee-Waters
October 11	Joué-lès-Tours, France; Hard $50,000; Singles draw – Doubles draw	(United States) Alison Riske; 5–7 6–4 6–1	(Russia) Vesna Manasieva	(Australia) Jelena Dokić (Germany) Tatjana Malek	(Bulgaria) Elitsa Kostova (France) Audrey Bergot (France) Stéphanie Cohen-Aloro (France) Stéphanie Foretz Gacon
October 11	Joué-lès-Tours, France; Hard $50,000; Singles draw – Doubles draw	(Germany) Tatjana Malek (France) Irena Pavlovic; 6–4 5–7 [10-8]	(France) Stéphanie Cohen-Aloro (Tunisia) Selima Sfar	(Australia) Jelena Dokić (Germany) Tatjana Malek	(Bulgaria) Elitsa Kostova (France) Audrey Bergot (France) Stéphanie Cohen-Aloro (France) Stéphanie Foretz Gacon
October 11	Mount Gambier, Australia; Hard $25,000; Singles draw – Doubles draw	(Japan) Erika Sema; 6–2 6–3	(Brazil) Ana-Clara Duarte	(Australia) Ashleigh Barty (Australia) Jade Hopper	(Australia) Sophie Letcher (Turkey) Pemra Özgen (Australia) Ashling Sumner (Australia) Tammi Patterson
October 11	Mount Gambier, Australia; Hard $25,000; Singles draw – Doubles draw	(Australia) Alison Bai (Brazil) Ana-Clara Duarte; Walkover	(Australia) Daniella Dominikovic (Poland) Sandra Zaniewska	(Australia) Ashleigh Barty (Australia) Jade Hopper	(Australia) Sophie Letcher (Turkey) Pemra Özgen (Australia) Ashling Sumner (Australia) Tammi Patterson
October 11	Ain Elsokhna, Egypt; Clay $10,000; Singles draw – Doubles draw	(Italy) Valentine Confalonieri; 5-0 Retired	(Czech Republic) Iveta Gerlová	(Slovakia) Zuzana Zlochová (Ukraine) Elizaveta Ianchuk	(Russia) Galina Fokina (Greece) Despina Papamichail (Ukraine) Anna Shkudun (Czech Republic) Lucie Kriegsmannová
October 11	Ain Elsokhna, Egypt; Clay $10,000; Singles draw – Doubles draw	(Czech Republic) Iveta Gerlová (Czech Republic) Lucie Kriegsmannová; 6–1 6–4	(Italy) Valentine Confalonieri (Slovenia) Dalila Jakupovič	(Slovakia) Zuzana Zlochová (Ukraine) Elizaveta Ianchuk	(Russia) Galina Fokina (Greece) Despina Papamichail (Ukraine) Anna Shkudun (Czech Republic) Lucie Kriegsmannová
October 11	Kharkiv, Ukraine; Carpet $25,000; Singles draw – Doubles draw	(Georgia (country)) Oksana Kalashnikova; 7–5 4–6 6–4	(Russia) Daria Kuchmina	(Georgia (country)) Sofia Shapatava (Ukraine) Ganna Piven	(France) Alizé Lim (Belarus) Polina Pekhova (Ukraine) Oksana Pavlova (Ukraine) Elina Svitolina
October 11	Kharkiv, Ukraine; Carpet $25,000; Singles draw – Doubles draw	(Ukraine) Ganna Piven (Ukraine) Anastasiya Vasylyeva; 6–4 6–4	(Romania) Mihaela Buzărnescu (Russia) Marina Shamayko	(Georgia (country)) Sofia Shapatava (Ukraine) Ganna Piven	(France) Alizé Lim (Belarus) Polina Pekhova (Ukraine) Oksana Pavlova (Ukraine) Elina Svitolina
October 11	Settimo San Pietro, Italy; Clay $10,000; Singles draw – Doubles draw	(Italy) Anastasia Grymalska; 4–6 6–2 7–5	(Italy) Karin Knapp	(Hungary) Vanda Lukács (Italy) Erika Zanchetta	(Denmark) Mai Grage (Italy) Alice Moroni (Switzerland) Lisa Sabino (Italy) Federica Quercia
October 11	Settimo San Pietro, Italy; Clay $10,000; Singles draw – Doubles draw	(Germany) Sabrina Baumgarten (Netherlands) Valeria Podda; 7–5 6–0	(Italy) Elisa Salis (Italy) Valentina Sulpizio	(Hungary) Vanda Lukács (Italy) Erika Zanchetta	(Denmark) Mai Grage (Italy) Alice Moroni (Switzerland) Lisa Sabino (Italy) Federica Quercia
October 11	Antalya, Turkey; Clay $10,000; Singles draw – Doubles draw	(Romania) Cristina Dinu; 6–3 6–3	(Poland) Barbara Sobaszkiewicz	(Uzbekistan) Vlada Ekshibarova (Netherlands) Lesley Kerkhove	(Bulgaria) Viktorija Tomova (Slovakia) Chantal Škamlová (Slovakia) Karin Morgošová (Ukraine) Sofiya Kovalets
October 11	Antalya, Turkey; Clay $10,000; Singles draw – Doubles draw	(Slovakia) Chantal Škamlová (Slovakia) Nikola Vajdová; 6–1 6–3	(Turkey) Başak Eraydın (Italy) Camilla Rosatello	(Uzbekistan) Vlada Ekshibarova (Netherlands) Lesley Kerkhove	(Bulgaria) Viktorija Tomova (Slovakia) Chantal Škamlová (Slovakia) Karin Morgošová (Ukraine) Sofiya Kovalets
October 11	Pattaya, Thailand; Hard $10,000; Singles draw – Doubles draw	(Thailand) Luksika Kumkhum; 6–4 6–3	(Norway) Emma Flood	(Chinese Taipei) Chen Yi (China) Zhu Lin	(Japan) Hirono Watanabe (Thailand) Nicha Lertpitaksinchai (New Zealand) Katherine Westbury (Austria) Nicole Rottmann
October 11	Pattaya, Thailand; Hard $10,000; Singles draw – Doubles draw	(Chinese Taipei) Chen Yi (Thailand) Varatchaya Wongteanchai; 7–5 6–2	(Chinese Taipei) Juan Ting-fei (China) Zhu Lin	(Chinese Taipei) Chen Yi (China) Zhu Lin	(Japan) Hirono Watanabe (Thailand) Nicha Lertpitaksinchai (New Zealand) Katherine Westbury (Austria) Nicole Rottmann
October 11	São Paulo, Brazil; Clay $10,000; Singles draw – Doubles draw	(Brazil) Roxane Vaisemberg; 7–6(9–7) 4–6 6–4	(Argentina) Catalina Pella	(Argentina) Carla Lucero (Brazil) Teliana Pereira	(Argentina) Aranza Salut (Brazil) Nathalia Rossi (Brazil) Fernanda Hermenegildo (Argentina) Vanesa Furlanetto
October 11	São Paulo, Brazil; Clay $10,000; Singles draw – Doubles draw	(Brazil) Monique Albuquerque (Brazil) Vivian Segnini; 6–4 6–4	(Brazil) Nathalia Rossi (Argentina) Barbara Rush	(Argentina) Carla Lucero (Brazil) Teliana Pereira	(Argentina) Aranza Salut (Brazil) Nathalia Rossi (Brazil) Fernanda Hermenegildo (Argentina) Vanesa Furlanetto
October 11	Bol, Croatia; Clay $10,000; Singles draw – Doubles draw	(Croatia) Dijana Banoveć; 6–0 6–0	(Bulgaria) Martina Gledacheva	(Italy) Vivienne Vierin (Romania) Ingrid-Alexandra Radu	(Italy) Paola Cigui (Slovenia) Anja Prislan (Poland) Katarzyna Kawa (Germany) Dejana Raickovic
October 11	Bol, Croatia; Clay $10,000; Singles draw – Doubles draw	(Poland) Katarzyna Kawa (Poland) Natalia Kołat; 5–7 6–4 [10-8]	(Slovenia) Anja Prislan (Netherlands) Eva Wacanno	(Italy) Vivienne Vierin (Romania) Ingrid-Alexandra Radu	(Italy) Paola Cigui (Slovenia) Anja Prislan (Poland) Katarzyna Kawa (Germany) Dejana Raickovic
October 11	Lima, Peru; Clay $10,000; Singles draw – Doubles draw	(Argentina) Lucía Jara-Lozano; 6–7(4) 6–3 6–3	(Brazil) Maria Fernanda Alves	(Peru) Patricia Kú Flores (Peru) Katherine Miranda-Chang	(United States) Nataly Yoo (Argentina) Guadalupe Pérez Rojas (Peru) Ingrid Várgas Calvo (Chile) Andrea Koch Benvenuto
October 11	Lima, Peru; Clay $10,000; Singles draw – Doubles draw	(Brazil) Maria Fernanda Alves (Brazil) Isabela Miró; 6–4 6–4	(Colombia) Karen Castiblanco (Chile) Andrea Koch Benvenuto	(Peru) Patricia Kú Flores (Peru) Katherine Miranda-Chang	(United States) Nataly Yoo (Argentina) Guadalupe Pérez Rojas (Peru) Ingrid Várgas Calvo (Chile) Andrea Koch Benvenuto
October 18	Saint Raphaël, France; Hard $50,000; Singles draw – Doubles draw	(United States) Alison Riske; 6–4 6–2	(Poland) Urszula Radwańska	(Spain) Laura Pous Tió (Germany) Tatjana Malek	(France) Claire Feuerstein (Croatia) Karolina Šprem (France) Stéphanie Foretz Gacon (Russia) Vesna Manasieva
October 18	Saint Raphaël, France; Hard $50,000; Singles draw – Doubles draw	(Austria) Sandra Klemenschits (Germany) Tatjana Malek; 6–2 6–4	(Spain) Estrella Cabeza Candela (Spain) Laura Pous Tió	(Spain) Laura Pous Tió (Germany) Tatjana Malek	(France) Claire Feuerstein (Croatia) Karolina Šprem (France) Stéphanie Foretz Gacon (Russia) Vesna Manasieva
October 18	Rock Hill, United States; Hard $25,000; Singles draw – Doubles draw	(Italy) Camila Giorgi; 6–3 6–4	(United States) Irina Falconi	(United States) Lauren Albanese (Croatia) Jelena Pandžić	(United States) Caitlin Whoriskey (Canada) Sharon Fichman (United States) Grace Min (United States) Krista Hardebeck
October 18	Rock Hill, United States; Hard $25,000; Singles draw – Doubles draw	(Brazil) Maria Fernanda Alves (Colombia) Mariana Duque; 6–1 4–6 [10-4]	(United States) Sanaz Marand (United States) Caitlin Whoriskey	(United States) Lauren Albanese (Croatia) Jelena Pandžić	(United States) Caitlin Whoriskey (Canada) Sharon Fichman (United States) Grace Min (United States) Krista Hardebeck
October 18	Glasgow, United Kingdom; Hard $25,000; Singles draw – Doubles draw	(Czech Republic) Karolína Plíšková; 3–6 6–0 6–3	(Greece) Eirini Georgatou	(United Kingdom) Naomi Broady (Portugal) Magali de Lattre	(Russia) Valeria Savinykh (France) Audrey Bergot (Romania) Irina-Camelia Begu (United Kingdom) Tara Moore
October 18	Glasgow, United Kingdom; Hard $25,000; Singles draw – Doubles draw	(Denmark) Karen Barbat (Italy) Julia Mayr; Walkover	(Greece) Eirini Georgatou (Russia) Valeria Savinykh	(United Kingdom) Naomi Broady (Portugal) Magali de Lattre	(Russia) Valeria Savinykh (France) Audrey Bergot (Romania) Irina-Camelia Begu (United Kingdom) Tara Moore
October 18	Seville, Spain; Clay $10,000; Singles draw – Doubles draw	(Italy) Karin Knapp; 6–0 6–1	(Venezuela) Andrea Gámiz	(Spain) Eva Fernández Brugués (Italy) Anastasia Grymalska	(Spain) Pilar Domínguez López (Italy) Federica Quercia (United Kingdom) Amanda Carreras (Spain) Arabela Fernández Rabener
October 18	Seville, Spain; Clay $10,000; Singles draw – Doubles draw	(Spain) Pilar Domínguez López (Spain) Shelia Solsona-Carcasona; 7–6(2) 6–2	(France) Morgane Pons (France) Alice Tisset	(Spain) Eva Fernández Brugués (Italy) Anastasia Grymalska	(Spain) Pilar Domínguez López (Italy) Federica Quercia (United Kingdom) Amanda Carreras (Spain) Arabela Fernández Rabener
October 18	Dubrovnik, Croatia; Clay $10,000; Singles draw – Doubles draw	(Romania) Diana Enache; 6–3 7–5	(Italy) Vivienne Vierin	(Croatia) Dijana Banoveć (Bulgaria) Martina Gledacheva	(Serbia) Nataša Zorić (Italy) Paola Cigui (Poland) Katarzyna Kawa (Montenegro) Danka Kovinić
October 18	Dubrovnik, Croatia; Clay $10,000; Singles draw – Doubles draw	(Romania) Raluca Elena Platon (Romania) Ingrid-Alexandra Radu; 1–6 6–1 [10–6]	(Romania) Elora Dabija (Serbia) Nataša Zorić	(Croatia) Dijana Banoveć (Bulgaria) Martina Gledacheva	(Serbia) Nataša Zorić (Italy) Paola Cigui (Poland) Katarzyna Kawa (Montenegro) Danka Kovinić
October 18	Antalya, Turkey; Clay $10,000; Singles draw – Doubles draw	(Romania) Cristina Dinu; 6–2 6–2	(Russia) Polina Vinogradova	(United Kingdom) Nicola Slater (Uzbekistan) Vlada Ekshibarova	(Ukraine) Sofiya Kovalets (Germany) Korina Perkovic (Slovakia) Nikola Vajdová (Bulgaria) Isabella Shinikova
October 18	Antalya, Turkey; Clay $10,000; Singles draw – Doubles draw	(Romania) Cristina Dinu (Romania) Ionela-Andreea Iova; 1–6 6–2 [10–7]	(Uzbekistan) Vlada Ekshibarova (Poland) Barbara Sobaszkiewicz	(United Kingdom) Nicola Slater (Uzbekistan) Vlada Ekshibarova	(Ukraine) Sofiya Kovalets (Germany) Korina Perkovic (Slovakia) Nikola Vajdová (Bulgaria) Isabella Shinikova
October 18	Yeongwol, South Korea; Hard $10,000; Singles draw – Doubles draw	(South Korea) Kim Kun-hee; 7–5 1–2 Retired	(South Korea) Kim Na-ri	(South Korea) Kim Sun-jung (South Korea) Kim Hae-sung	(South Korea) Hong Hyun-hui (South Korea) Kim Jung-eun (Japan) Yumi Nakano (South Korea) Kang Seo-kyung
October 18	Yeongwol, South Korea; Hard $10,000; Singles draw – Doubles draw	(South Korea) Kim Ji-young (South Korea) Kim Jung-eun; 3–6 7–5 [10–7]	(South Korea) Kim Kun-hee (South Korea) Kim Na-ri	(South Korea) Kim Sun-jung (South Korea) Kim Hae-sung	(South Korea) Hong Hyun-hui (South Korea) Kim Jung-eun (Japan) Yumi Nakano (South Korea) Kang Seo-kyung
October 18	Santa Maria do Herval, Brazil; Clay $10,000; Singles draw – Doubles draw	(Brazil) Roxane Vaisemberg; 6–3 6–4	(Chile) Fernanda Brito	(Brazil) Natasha Lotuffo (Paraguay) Verónica Cepede Royg	(Brazil) Eduarda Piai (Brazil) Liz Bogarin Koehler Bogarin (Paraguay) Isabella Robbiani (Chile) Daniela Seguel
October 18	Santa Maria do Herval, Brazil; Clay $10,000; Singles draw – Doubles draw	(Paraguay) Verónica Cepede Royg (Brazil) Vivian Segnini; Walkover	(Brazil) Natasha Lotuffo (Brazil) Roxane Vaisemberg	(Brazil) Natasha Lotuffo (Paraguay) Verónica Cepede Royg	(Brazil) Eduarda Piai (Brazil) Liz Bogarin Koehler Bogarin (Paraguay) Isabella Robbiani (Chile) Daniela Seguel
October 18	Ain Elsokhna, Egypt; Clay $10,000; Singles draw – Doubles draw	(Romania) Alexandra Cadanțu; 6–2 6–3	(Slovakia) Zuzana Zlochová	(Hungary) Réka-Luca Jani (Slovakia) Vivien Juhászová	(Belgium) Elyne Boeykens (Czech Republic) Lucie Kriegsmannová (Ukraine) Elizaveta Ianchuk (Czech Republic) Martina Kubičíková
October 18	Ain Elsokhna, Egypt; Clay $10,000; Singles draw – Doubles draw	(Czech Republic) Iveta Gerlová (Czech Republic) Lucie Kriegsmannová; 6–3 3–6 [10-8]	(Hungary) Réka-Luca Jani (Czech Republic) Martina Kubičíková	(Hungary) Réka-Luca Jani (Slovakia) Vivien Juhászová	(Belgium) Elyne Boeykens (Czech Republic) Lucie Kriegsmannová (Ukraine) Elizaveta Ianchuk (Czech Republic) Martina Kubičíková
October 18	Monastir, Tunisia; Hard $10,000; Singles draw – Doubles draw	(Czech Republic) Martina Borecká; 7–5 6–1	(Slovakia) Jana Čepelová	(Tunisia) Ons Jabeur (Tunisia) Nour Abbès	(France) Stéphanie Vongsouthi (Italy) Alice Savoretti (Netherlands) Ghislaine van Baal (France) Océane Adam
October 18	Monastir, Tunisia; Hard $10,000; Singles draw – Doubles draw	(Russia) Irina Glimakova (Russia) Polina Monova; 6–2 1–6 [10–7]	(Serbia) Jovana Jakšić (Belarus) Sasha Khabibulina	(Tunisia) Ons Jabeur (Tunisia) Nour Abbès	(France) Stéphanie Vongsouthi (Italy) Alice Savoretti (Netherlands) Ghislaine van Baal (France) Océane Adam
October 18	Khon Kaen, Thailand; Hard $10,000; Singles draw – Doubles draw	(China) Zhu Lin; 6–3 6–2	(Thailand) Luksika Kumkhum	(Japan) Maya Kato (Thailand) Peangtarn Plipuech	(Russia) Alisa Danilova (Austria) Nicole Rottmann (New Zealand) Katherine Westbury (Thailand) Kamonwan Buayam
October 18	Khon Kaen, Thailand; Hard $10,000; Singles draw – Doubles draw	(Thailand) Luksika Kumkhum (Thailand) Varatchaya Wongteanchai; 6–4 7–5	(Vietnam) Trang Huynh Phuong Dai (Japan) Maya Kato	(Japan) Maya Kato (Thailand) Peangtarn Plipuech	(Russia) Alisa Danilova (Austria) Nicole Rottmann (New Zealand) Katherine Westbury (Thailand) Kamonwan Buayam
October 18	Akko, Israel; Hard $10,000; Singles draw – Doubles draw	(Israel) Julia Glushko; 6–2 6–2	(Germany) Julia Kimmelmann	(Czech Republic) Zuzana Linhová (Belgium) Gally De Wael	(Israel) Valeria Patiuk (Israel) Deniz Khazaniuk (Russia) Diana Isaeva (Austria) Janina Toljan
October 18	Akko, Israel; Hard $10,000; Singles draw – Doubles draw	(Israel) Julia Glushko (Austria) Janina Toljan; 6–2 6–2	(Belgium) Gally De Wael (Czech Republic) Zuzana Linhová	(Czech Republic) Zuzana Linhová (Belgium) Gally De Wael	(Israel) Valeria Patiuk (Israel) Deniz Khazaniuk (Russia) Diana Isaeva (Austria) Janina Toljan
October 18	Lagos, Nigeria; Hard $25,000; Singles draw – Doubles draw	(Slovakia) Zuzana Kučová; 6–2 6–0	(France) Nathalie Piquion	(Austria) Melanie Klaffner (Slovenia) Dalila Jakupovič	(Germany) Karolina Nowak (United States) Gail Brodsky (Switzerland) Conny Perrin (Russia) Nina Bratchikova
October 18	Lagos, Nigeria; Hard $25,000; Singles draw – Doubles draw	(Russia) Nina Bratchikova (Romania) Ágnes Szatmári; 6–4 6–3	(Sweden) Anna Brazhnikova (Russia) Anastasia Mukhametova	(Austria) Melanie Klaffner (Slovenia) Dalila Jakupovič	(Germany) Karolina Nowak (United States) Gail Brodsky (Switzerland) Conny Perrin (Russia) Nina Bratchikova
October 25	Poitiers, France; Hard $100,000; Singles draw – Doubles draw	(Sweden) Sofia Arvidsson; 6–2 7–6(4)	(France) Pauline Parmentier	(Croatia) Karolina Šprem (Czech Republic) Petra Kvitová	(Russia) Regina Kulikova (France) Stéphanie Foretz Gacon (Luxembourg) Anne Kremer (Slovakia) Magdaléna Rybáriková
October 25	Poitiers, France; Hard $100,000; Singles draw – Doubles draw	(Czech Republic) Lucie Hradecká (Czech Republic) Renata Voráčová; 6–7(5) 6–2 [10-5]	(Uzbekistan) Akgul Amanmuradova (Germany) Kristina Barrois	(Croatia) Karolina Šprem (Czech Republic) Petra Kvitová	(Russia) Regina Kulikova (France) Stéphanie Foretz Gacon (Luxembourg) Anne Kremer (Slovakia) Magdaléna Rybáriková
October 25	Cairo, Egypt; Clay $25,000; Singles draw – Doubles draw	(Liechtenstein) Stephanie Vogt; 6–1 6–3	(Slovenia) Maša Zec Peškirič	(Portugal) Maria João Koehler (Slovakia) Kristína Kučová	(Hungary) Réka-Luca Jani (Slovakia) Michaela Pochabová (Georgia (country)) Margalita Chakhnashvili (Russia) Nanuli Pipiya
October 25	Cairo, Egypt; Clay $25,000; Singles draw – Doubles draw	(Hungary) Réka-Luca Jani (Czech Republic) Martina Kubičíková; 6–7(4) 6–1 [11-9]	(Liechtenstein) Stephanie Vogt (Slovenia) Maša Zec Peškirič	(Portugal) Maria João Koehler (Slovakia) Kristína Kučová	(Hungary) Réka-Luca Jani (Slovakia) Michaela Pochabová (Georgia (country)) Margalita Chakhnashvili (Russia) Nanuli Pipiya
October 25	Lagos, Nigeria; Hard $25,000; Singles draw – Doubles draw	(Russia) Nina Bratchikova; 7–5 6–1	(Slovakia) Zuzana Kučová	(Romania) Ágnes Szatmári (France) Nathalie Piquion	(Russia) Anastasia Mukhametova (Austria) Melanie Klaffner (Switzerland) Conny Perrin (Poland) Karolina Kosińska
October 25	Lagos, Nigeria; Hard $25,000; Singles draw – Doubles draw	(Austria) Melanie Klaffner (Poland) Karolina Kosińska; 3–6 7–5 [10–7]	(Russia) Nina Bratchikova (Romania) Ágnes Szatmári	(Romania) Ágnes Szatmári (France) Nathalie Piquion	(Russia) Anastasia Mukhametova (Austria) Melanie Klaffner (Switzerland) Conny Perrin (Poland) Karolina Kosińska
October 25	Bayamón, Puerto Rico; Hard $25,000; Singles draw – Doubles draw	(United States) Lauren Davis; 7–6(7–5) 6–4	(United States) Madison Keys	(Argentina) María Irigoyen (Australia) Johanna Konta	(United States) Sloane Stephens (Belgium) Tamaryn Hendler (United States) Lauren Albanese (United States) Julia Cohen
October 25	Bayamón, Puerto Rico; Hard $25,000; Singles draw – Doubles draw	(Brazil) Maria Fernanda Alves (Canada) Marie-Ève Pelletier; 7–6(5) 6–4	(Argentina) María Irigoyen (Argentina) Florencia Molinero	(Argentina) María Irigoyen (Australia) Johanna Konta	(United States) Sloane Stephens (Belgium) Tamaryn Hendler (United States) Lauren Albanese (United States) Julia Cohen
October 25	Istanbul, Turkey; Hard $25,000; Singles draw – Doubles draw	(Belarus) Iryna Kuryanovich; 3–6 6–1 7–5	(Czech Republic) Andrea Hlaváčková	(Russia) Ekaterina Bychkova (Belarus) Darya Kustova	(Croatia) Silvia Njirić (Croatia) Ana Vrljić (Czech Republic) Karolína Plíšková (Portugal) Magali de Lattre
October 25	Istanbul, Turkey; Hard $25,000; Singles draw – Doubles draw	(Georgia (country)) Oksana Kalashnikova (Russia) Marta Sirotkina; 6–3 6–1	(Russia) Ekaterina Bychkova (Belarus) Darya Kustova	(Russia) Ekaterina Bychkova (Belarus) Darya Kustova	(Croatia) Silvia Njirić (Croatia) Ana Vrljić (Czech Republic) Karolína Plíšková (Portugal) Magali de Lattre
October 25	St. Cugat, Spain; Clay $10,000; Singles draw – Doubles draw	(Italy) Benedetta Davato; 6–4 3–6 6–2	(Italy) Federica Quercia	(Lithuania) Iveta Dapkute (Italy) Karin Knapp	(Romania) Diana Stomlega (Spain) Laura Ubeda López (Spain) Georgina García-Pérez (Ukraine) Yevgeniya Kryvoruchko
October 25	St. Cugat, Spain; Clay $10,000; Singles draw – Doubles draw	(Spain) Yvonne Cavallé-Reimers (Spain) Carmen López Rueda; 6–3 7–5	(Germany) Desiree Schelenz (Russia) Yana Sizikova	(Lithuania) Iveta Dapkute (Italy) Karin Knapp	(Romania) Diana Stomlega (Spain) Laura Ubeda López (Spain) Georgina García-Pérez (Ukraine) Yevgeniya Kryvoruchko
October 25	Dubrovnik, Croatia; Clay $10,000; Singles draw – Doubles draw	(Slovakia) Klaudia Boczová; 6–3 7–5	(Serbia) Nataša Zorić	(Romania) Diana Enache (Croatia) Dijana Banoveć	(Italy) Andreea Văideanu (Bosnia and Herzegovina) Jasmina Kajtazović (Czech Republic) Darina Šeděnková (Romania) Elora Dabija
October 25	Dubrovnik, Croatia; Clay $10,000; Singles draw – Doubles draw	(Romania) Diana Enache (Italy) Andreea Văideanu; 6–3 6–2	(Poland) Olga Brózda (Poland) Natalia Kołat	(Romania) Diana Enache (Croatia) Dijana Banoveć	(Italy) Andreea Văideanu (Bosnia and Herzegovina) Jasmina Kajtazović (Czech Republic) Darina Šeděnková (Romania) Elora Dabija
October 25	Vila Real Santo António, Portugal; Clay $10,000; Singles draw – Doubles draw	(Italy) Anastasia Grymalska; 6–1 7–5	(Germany) Lena-Marie Hofmann	(Netherlands) Marcella Koek (France) Morgane Pons	(Spain) Arabela Fernández Rabener (Spain) Pilar Domínguez López (Czech Republic) Petra Krejsová (France) Alice Tisset
October 25	Vila Real Santo António, Portugal; Clay $10,000; Singles draw – Doubles draw	(Italy) Alice Balducci (Italy) Anastasia Grymalska; 6–2 6–3	(France) Morgane Pons (France) Alice Tisset	(Netherlands) Marcella Koek (France) Morgane Pons	(Spain) Arabela Fernández Rabener (Spain) Pilar Domínguez López (Czech Republic) Petra Krejsová (France) Alice Tisset
October 25	Yeongwol, South Korea; Hard $10,000; Singles draw – Doubles draw	(South Korea) Kim Ji-young; 7–6(7–1) 6–3	(South Korea) Kang Seo-kyung	(South Korea) Kim Kun-hee (South Korea) Jeong Yoon-young	(South Korea) Jang Su-jeong (New Caledonia) Anaeve Pain (South Korea) Kim Hae-sung (South Korea) Lee Hye-min
October 25	Yeongwol, South Korea; Hard $10,000; Singles draw – Doubles draw	(South Korea) Ham Mi-rae (South Korea) Jeong Yoon-young; 6–3 2–6 [10-4]	(South Korea) Kang Seo-kyung (South Korea) Lee Hye-min	(South Korea) Kim Kun-hee (South Korea) Jeong Yoon-young	(South Korea) Jang Su-jeong (New Caledonia) Anaeve Pain (South Korea) Kim Hae-sung (South Korea) Lee Hye-min
October 25	Bogotá, Colombia; Clay $10,000; Singles draw – Doubles draw	(Venezuela) Adriana Pérez; 6–1 1–6 6–1	(Colombia) Karen Castiblanco	(Chile) Daniela Seguel (Colombia) Melissa Bolívar	(Chile) Andrea Koch Benvenuto (Peru) Patricia Kú Flores (Colombia) Alexandra Moreno-Kaste (Peru) Mariana Demichelli Vergara
October 25	Bogotá, Colombia; Clay $10,000; Singles draw – Doubles draw	(Colombia) Karen Castiblanco (Chile) Andrea Koch Benvenuto; 1–6 6–3 [10–6]	(Chile) Fernanda Brito (Chile) Daniela Seguel	(Chile) Daniela Seguel (Colombia) Melissa Bolívar	(Chile) Andrea Koch Benvenuto (Peru) Patricia Kú Flores (Colombia) Alexandra Moreno-Kaste (Peru) Mariana Demichelli Vergara
October 25	Taipei, Chinese Taipei; Hard $10,000; Singles draw – Doubles draw	(China) Zheng Saisai; 6–3 6–3	(Hong Kong) Zhang Ling	(Chinese Taipei) Chan Chin-wei (Chinese Taipei) Chen Yi	(Japan) Yumi Nakano (China) Liu Shaozhuo (Chinese Taipei) Hsieh Su-wei (Chinese Taipei) Chen Lu-Ling
October 25	Taipei, Chinese Taipei; Hard $10,000; Singles draw – Doubles draw	(Chinese Taipei) Kao Shao-yuan (China) Wang Qiang; 6–3 7–6(2)	(Chinese Taipei) Juan Ting-fei (China) Zheng Saisai	(Chinese Taipei) Chan Chin-wei (Chinese Taipei) Chen Yi	(Japan) Yumi Nakano (China) Liu Shaozhuo (Chinese Taipei) Hsieh Su-wei (Chinese Taipei) Chen Lu-Ling
October 25	Itu, Brazil; Clay $10,000; Singles draw – Doubles draw	(Brazil) Nathalia Rossi; 6–4 6–4	(Argentina) Barbara Rush	(Brazil) Vivian Segnini (Paraguay) Isabella Robbiani	(Brazil) Nathaly Kurata (Brazil) Teliana Pereira (Argentina) Catalina López (Brazil) Eduarda Piai
October 25	Itu, Brazil; Clay $10,000; Singles draw – Doubles draw	(Brazil) Gabriela Cé (Brazil) Vivian Segnini; 6–0 6–4	(Brazil) Flávia Dechandt Araújo (Brazil) Carla Forte	(Brazil) Vivian Segnini (Paraguay) Isabella Robbiani	(Brazil) Nathaly Kurata (Brazil) Teliana Pereira (Argentina) Catalina López (Brazil) Eduarda Piai
October 25	Kuching, Malaysia; Hard $10,000; Singles draw – Doubles draw	(Uzbekistan) Sabina Sharipova; 6–4 6–3	(Indonesia) Sandy Gumulya	(France) Élodie Rogge-Dietrich (Finland) Piia Suomalainen	(United States) Ivana King (India) Rushmi Chakravarthi (Germany) Jessica Sabeshinskaja (Austria) Nicole Rottmann
October 25	Kuching, Malaysia; Hard $10,000; Singles draw – Doubles draw	(Indonesia) Sandy Gumulya (Uzbekistan) Sabina Sharipova; 6–3 6–2	(India) Rushmi Chakravarthi (France) Élodie Rogge-Dietrich	(France) Élodie Rogge-Dietrich (Finland) Piia Suomalainen	(United States) Ivana King (India) Rushmi Chakravarthi (Germany) Jessica Sabeshinskaja (Austria) Nicole Rottmann
October 25	Monastir, Tunisia; Hard $10,000; Singles draw – Doubles draw	(Slovakia) Jana Čepelová; 6–2 6–2	(Latvia) Diāna Marcinkēviča	(Tunisia) Ons Jabeur (Netherlands) Bernice van de Velde	(Italy) Alice Savoretti (Russia) Diana Arutyunova (Malta) Kimberley Cassar (Italy) Martina Caciotti
October 25	Monastir, Tunisia; Hard $10,000; Singles draw – Doubles draw	(Netherlands) Kim Kilsdonk (Netherlands) Nicolette van Uitert; 6–3 6–2	(Italy) Indra Bigi (Italy) Nicole Clerico	(Tunisia) Ons Jabeur (Netherlands) Bernice van de Velde	(Italy) Alice Savoretti (Russia) Diana Arutyunova (Malta) Kimberley Cassar (Italy) Martina Caciotti

== November ==
Week of	Tournament	Winner	Runners-up	Semifinalists	Quarterfinalists
November 1	OEC Taipei Ladies Open; Taipei, Chinese Taipei; Carpet $100,000+H; Singles – Doubles	(China) Peng Shuai; 6–1 6–4	(Japan) Ayumi Morita	(Australia) Jarmila Groth (Thailand) Tamarine Tanasugarn	(Chinese Taipei) Chang Kai-chen (China) Wang Qiang (Serbia) Bojana Jovanovski (Japan) Junri Namigata
November 1	OEC Taipei Ladies Open; Taipei, Chinese Taipei; Carpet $100,000+H; Singles – Doubles	(Chinese Taipei) Chang Kai-chen (Chinese Taipei) Chuang Chia-jung; 6–4 6–2	(Chinese Taipei) Hsieh Su-wei (India) Sania Mirza	(Australia) Jarmila Groth (Thailand) Tamarine Tanasugarn	(Chinese Taipei) Chang Kai-chen (China) Wang Qiang (Serbia) Bojana Jovanovski (Japan) Junri Namigata
November 1	Grapevine, United States; Hard $50,000; Singles draw – Doubles draw	(United States) Varvara Lepchenko; 7–6(1) 6–4	(United States) Jamie Hampton	(United States) Alexandra Stevenson (United States) Madison Brengle	(Georgia (country)) Anna Tatishvili (Russia) Elena Kulikova (Croatia) Ajla Tomljanović (United States) Ahsha Rolle
November 1	Grapevine, United States; Hard $50,000; Singles draw – Doubles draw	(United States) Ahsha Rolle (United States) Mashona Washington; 5–7 6–2 [11-9]	(United States) Julie Ditty (South Africa) Chanelle Scheepers	(United States) Alexandra Stevenson (United States) Madison Brengle	(Georgia (country)) Anna Tatishvili (Russia) Elena Kulikova (Croatia) Ajla Tomljanović (United States) Ahsha Rolle
November 1	Toronto, Canada; Hard $50,000; Singles draw – Doubles draw	(United Kingdom) Heather Watson; 6–3 6–3	(France) Alizé Lim	(Canada) Rebecca Marino (United States) Sloane Stephens	(France) Caroline Garcia (Canada) Carol Zhao (United States) Lauren Albanese (Croatia) Jelena Pandžić
November 1	Toronto, Canada; Hard $50,000; Singles draw – Doubles draw	(Canada) Gabriela Dabrowski (Canada) Sharon Fichman; 6–4 6–0	(United States) Brittany Augustine (United States) Alexandra Mueller	(Canada) Rebecca Marino (United States) Sloane Stephens	(France) Caroline Garcia (Canada) Carol Zhao (United States) Lauren Albanese (Croatia) Jelena Pandžić
November 1	Ismaning, Germany; Carpet $50,000+H; Singles draw – Doubles draw	(Poland) Urszula Radwańska; 7–5 6–4	(Czech Republic) Andrea Hlaváčková	(Germany) Kristina Barrois (Germany) Tatjana Malek	(United Kingdom) Naomi Cavaday (Germany) Annika Beck (Russia) Regina Kulikova (Germany) Julia Schruff
November 1	Ismaning, Germany; Carpet $50,000+H; Singles draw – Doubles draw	(Germany) Kristina Barrois (Germany) Anna-Lena Grönefeld; 6–1 7–6(3)	(Ukraine) Tetyana Arefyeva (Ukraine) Yuliana Fedak	(Germany) Kristina Barrois (Germany) Tatjana Malek	(United Kingdom) Naomi Cavaday (Germany) Annika Beck (Russia) Regina Kulikova (Germany) Julia Schruff
November 1	Nantes, France; Hard $50,000+H; Singles draw – Doubles draw	(Czech Republic) Lucie Hradecká; 6–3 6–1	(Russia) Valeria Savinykh	(Romania) Ioana Raluca Olaru (France) Stéphanie Foretz Gacon	(Czech Republic) Renata Voráčová (France) Séverine Beltrame (Bosnia and Herzegovina) Mervana Jugić-Salkić (France) Anaïs Laurendon
November 1	Nantes, France; Hard $50,000+H; Singles draw – Doubles draw	(United Kingdom) Anne Keothavong (United Kingdom) Anna Smith; 5–7 6–1 [10–6]	(Bosnia and Herzegovina) Mervana Jugić-Salkić (Croatia) Darija Jurak	(Romania) Ioana Raluca Olaru (France) Stéphanie Foretz Gacon	(Czech Republic) Renata Voráčová (France) Séverine Beltrame (Bosnia and Herzegovina) Mervana Jugić-Salkić (France) Anaïs Laurendon
November 1	Kalgoorlie, Australia; Hard $25,000; Singles draw – Doubles draw	(Israel) Julia Glushko; 6–1 6–2	(Australia) Isabella Holland	(Australia) Jessica Moore (New Zealand) Sacha Jones	(United Kingdom) Melanie South (Romania) Irina-Camelia Begu (Australia) Olivia Rogowska (Turkey) Çağla Büyükakçay
November 1	Kalgoorlie, Australia; Hard $25,000; Singles draw – Doubles draw	(Australia) Daniella Dominikovic (Australia) Jessica Moore; 6–4 2–6 [10–6]	(Hungary) Tímea Babos (Australia) Monika Wejnert	(Australia) Jessica Moore (New Zealand) Sacha Jones	(United Kingdom) Melanie South (Romania) Irina-Camelia Begu (Australia) Olivia Rogowska (Turkey) Çağla Büyükakçay
November 1	Bogotá, Colombia; Clay $10,000; Singles draw – Doubles draw	(Colombia) Yuliana Lizarazo; 6–1 7–6(1)	(United States) Nataly Yoo	(Chile) Andrea Koch Benvenuto (Colombia) Karen Castiblanco	(Peru) Patricia Kú Flores (Brazil) Karina Souza (Venezuela) Gabriela Coglitore (Chile) Fernanda Brito
November 1	Bogotá, Colombia; Clay $10,000; Singles draw – Doubles draw	(Colombia) Yuliana Lizarazo (Venezuela) Adriana Pérez; 6–2 7–6(5)	(Colombia) Karen Castiblanco (Chile) Andrea Koch Benvenuto	(Chile) Andrea Koch Benvenuto (Colombia) Karen Castiblanco	(Peru) Patricia Kú Flores (Brazil) Karina Souza (Venezuela) Gabriela Coglitore (Chile) Fernanda Brito
November 1	Manila, Philippines; Hard $10,000; Singles draw – Doubles draw	(Finland) Piia Suomalainen; 6–3 6–3	(Thailand) Luksika Kumkhum	(Germany) Katharina Lehnert (Belgium) Gally De Wael	(Thailand) Nungnadda Wannasuk (Thailand) Peangtarn Plipuech (United States) Chanelle van Nguyen (France) Élodie Rogge-Dietrich
November 1	Manila, Philippines; Hard $10,000; Singles draw – Doubles draw	(China) Yang Zhaoxuan (China) Zhu Lin; 6–4 6–7(5) [10–7]	(South Korea) Kim Ji-young (South Korea) Kim Jin-hee	(Germany) Katharina Lehnert (Belgium) Gally De Wael	(Thailand) Nungnadda Wannasuk (Thailand) Peangtarn Plipuech (United States) Chanelle van Nguyen (France) Élodie Rogge-Dietrich
November 1	Cariló, Argentina; Clay $10,000; Singles draw – Doubles draw	(Argentina) Vanesa Furlanetto; 6–3 6–3	(Argentina) Carla Lucero	(Argentina) Lucía Jara-Lozano (Argentina) Tatiana Búa	(Argentina) Florencia di Biasi (Germany) Karolina Nowak (Argentina) Luciana Sarmenti (Chile) Camila Silva
November 1	Cariló, Argentina; Clay $10,000; Singles draw – Doubles draw	(Argentina) Vanesa Furlanetto (Chile) Camila Silva; 6–2 6–1	(Argentina) Lucía Jara-Lozano (Argentina) Luciana Sarmenti	(Argentina) Lucía Jara-Lozano (Argentina) Tatiana Búa	(Argentina) Florencia di Biasi (Germany) Karolina Nowak (Argentina) Luciana Sarmenti (Chile) Camila Silva
November 1	Mallorca, Spain; Clay $10,000; Singles draw – Doubles draw	(Spain) Lara Arruabarrena Vecino; 6–3 6–3	(Spain) Sandra Soler-Sola	(Czech Republic) Kateřina Vaňková (Spain) Inés Ferrer Suárez	(Spain) Arabela Fernández Rabener (Portugal) Maria João Koehler (Spain) Carmen López Rueda (Italy) Gioia Barbieri
November 1	Mallorca, Spain; Clay $10,000; Singles draw – Doubles draw	(Spain) Lara Arruabarrena Vecino (Spain) Inés Ferrer Suárez; 7–5 6–2	(Portugal) Maria João Koehler (Russia) Avgusta Tsybysheva	(Czech Republic) Kateřina Vaňková (Spain) Inés Ferrer Suárez	(Spain) Arabela Fernández Rabener (Portugal) Maria João Koehler (Spain) Carmen López Rueda (Italy) Gioia Barbieri
November 1	Sunderland, United Kingdom; Hard $10,000; Singles draw – Doubles draw	(United Kingdom) Anna Fitzpatrick; 6–2 3–6 7–5	(United Kingdom) Samantha Murray	(Poland) Justyna Jegiołka (United Kingdom) Jocelyn Rae	(Germany) Katharina Holert (United Kingdom) Yasmin Clarke (Czech Republic) Nikola Fraňková (United Kingdom) Samantha Vickers
November 1	Sunderland, United Kingdom; Hard $10,000; Singles draw – Doubles draw	(United Kingdom) Amanda Elliott (United Kingdom) Anna Fitzpatrick; 6–2 6–3	(United Kingdom) Tara Moore (United Kingdom) Francesca Stephenson	(Poland) Justyna Jegiołka (United Kingdom) Jocelyn Rae	(Germany) Katharina Holert (United Kingdom) Yasmin Clarke (Czech Republic) Nikola Fraňková (United Kingdom) Samantha Vickers
November 1	Stockholm, Sweden; Hard $10,000; Singles draw – Doubles draw	(Slovakia) Michaela Hončová; 6–4 6–7(5) 6–3	(Sweden) Anna Brazhnikova	(Latvia) Diāna Marcinkēviča (Germany) Syna Kayser	(France) Stéphanie Vongsouthi (Norway) Caroline Rohde-Moe (Belgium) Alison Van Uytvanck (Switzerland) Lara Michel
November 1	Stockholm, Sweden; Hard $10,000; Singles draw – Doubles draw	(Switzerland) Xenia Knoll (Switzerland) Lara Michel; 6–3 6–3	(Denmark) Karen Barbat (Sweden) Anna Brazhnikova	(Latvia) Diāna Marcinkēviča (Germany) Syna Kayser	(France) Stéphanie Vongsouthi (Norway) Caroline Rohde-Moe (Belgium) Alison Van Uytvanck (Switzerland) Lara Michel
November 1	Antalya, Turkey; Hard $10,000; Singles draw – Doubles draw	(Russia) Marta Sirotkina; 6–2 6–0	(Slovakia) Martina Balogová	(Netherlands) Lesley Kerkhove (Uzbekistan) Vlada Ekshibarova	(France) Emilie Bacquet (Romania) Cristina Mitu (Slovakia) Klaudia Boczová (United Kingdom) Nicola Slater
November 1	Antalya, Turkey; Hard $10,000; Singles draw – Doubles draw	(Uzbekistan) Nigina Abduraimova (Russia) Martina Sirtokina; 3–6 6–1 [10–7]	(Russia) Julia Samuseva (Russia) Ekaterina Yakovleva	(Netherlands) Lesley Kerkhove (Uzbekistan) Vlada Ekshibarova	(France) Emilie Bacquet (Romania) Cristina Mitu (Slovakia) Klaudia Boczová (United Kingdom) Nicola Slater
November 1	Minsk, Belarus; Carpet $10,000; Singles draw – Doubles draw	(Ukraine) Anastasiya Vasylyeva; 6–4 4–6 6–3	(Russia) Eugeniya Pashkova	(Belarus) Polina Pekhova (Belarus) Aliaksandra Sasnovich	(Russia) Margarita Gasparyan (Russia) Tatiana Kotelnikova (Russia) Polina Vinogradova (Belarus) Lidziya Marozava
November 1	Minsk, Belarus; Carpet $10,000; Singles draw – Doubles draw	(Russia) Eugeniya Pashkova (Russia) Maria Zharkova; 5–7 7–5 [12-10]	(Ukraine) Oksana Pavlova (Russia) Ekaterina Yashina	(Belarus) Polina Pekhova (Belarus) Aliaksandra Sasnovich	(Russia) Margarita Gasparyan (Russia) Tatiana Kotelnikova (Russia) Polina Vinogradova (Belarus) Lidziya Marozava
November 1	La Marsa, Tunisia; Clay $10,000; Singles draw – Doubles draw	(United Kingdom) Amanda Carreras; 7–6(4) 6–0	(Italy) Erika Zanchetta	(Ukraine) Sofiya Kovalets (Czech Republic) Zuzana Linhová	(Germany) Sarah-Rebecca Sekulic (Serbia) Marina Kachar (Germany) Lena-Marie Hofmann (Italy) Federica Grazioso
November 1	La Marsa, Tunisia; Clay $10,000; Singles draw – Doubles draw	(United Kingdom) Amanda Carreras (Spain) Shelia Solsona-Carcasona; 6–4 7–5	(Mexico) Ximena Hermoso (Mexico) Ivette López	(Ukraine) Sofiya Kovalets (Czech Republic) Zuzana Linhová	(Germany) Sarah-Rebecca Sekulic (Serbia) Marina Kachar (Germany) Lena-Marie Hofmann (Italy) Federica Grazioso
November 8	Phoenix, United States; Hard $75,000; Singles draw – Doubles draw	(United States) Varvara Lepchenko; 6–3 7–6^{(7–5)}	(United States) Melanie Oudin	(Georgia (country)) Anna Tatishvili (United States) Irina Falconi	(United States) Jamie Hampton (Canada) Heidi El Tabakh (United States) Christina McHale (Argentina) María Irigoyen
November 8	Phoenix, United States; Hard $75,000; Singles draw – Doubles draw	(Ukraine) Tetiana Luzhanska (United States) Coco Vandeweghe; 7–5 6–4	(United States) Julia Boserup (United States) Sloane Stephens	(Georgia (country)) Anna Tatishvili (United States) Irina Falconi	(United States) Jamie Hampton (Canada) Heidi El Tabakh (United States) Christina McHale (Argentina) María Irigoyen
November 8	Esperance, Australia; Hard $25,000; Singles draw – Doubles draw	(New Zealand) Sacha Jones; 6–2 6–3	(Turkey) Çağla Büyükakçay	(Germany) Nicola Geuer (Australia) Sophie Letcher	(Romania) Mădălina Gojnea (Japan) Shiho Akita (Romania) Irina-Camelia Begu (United Kingdom) Melanie South
November 8	Esperance, Australia; Hard $25,000; Singles draw – Doubles draw	(Australia) Daniella Dominikovic (Australia) Jessica Moore; 7–6(5) 6–3	(Japan) Chiaki Okadaue (Japan) Remi Tezuka	(Germany) Nicola Geuer (Australia) Sophie Letcher	(Romania) Mădălina Gojnea (Japan) Shiho Akita (Romania) Irina-Camelia Begu (United Kingdom) Melanie South
November 8	Minsk, Belarus; Hard $25,000; Singles draw – Doubles draw	(Ukraine) Lesia Tsurenko; 6–3 6–2	(Netherlands) Richèl Hogenkamp	(United Kingdom) Naomi Cavaday (Slovakia) Kristína Kučová	(Russia) Evgeniya Rodina (Ukraine) Yulia Beygelzimer (Belarus) Iryna Kuryanovich (Georgia (country)) Oksana Kalashnikova
November 8	Minsk, Belarus; Hard $25,000; Singles draw – Doubles draw	(Russia) Elena Bovina (Russia) Ekaterina Bychkova; 6–4 6–0	(Poland) Paula Kania (Poland) Katarzyna Piter	(United Kingdom) Naomi Cavaday (Slovakia) Kristína Kučová	(Russia) Evgeniya Rodina (Ukraine) Yulia Beygelzimer (Belarus) Iryna Kuryanovich (Georgia (country)) Oksana Kalashnikova
November 8	Le Havre, France; Clay $10,000; Singles draw – Doubles draw	(Romania) Laura-Ioana Andrei; 6–2 6–4	(France) Céline Ghesquière	(France) Josepha Adam (France) Florence Haring	(Bulgaria) Nadejda Vassileva (France) Agathe Timsit (Netherlands) Nicolette van Uitert (France) Irina Ramialison
November 8	Le Havre, France; Clay $10,000; Singles draw – Doubles draw	(France) Céline Ghesquière (France) Andrea Ka; 7–5 7–5	(Romania) Laura-Ioana Andrei (Belgium) Michaela Boev	(France) Josepha Adam (France) Florence Haring	(Bulgaria) Nadejda Vassileva (France) Agathe Timsit (Netherlands) Nicolette van Uitert (France) Irina Ramialison
November 8	Mallorca, Spain; Clay $10,000; Singles draw – Doubles draw	(Spain) Lara Arruabarrena Vecino; 7–6(2) 6–3	(Portugal) Maria João Koehler	(Spain) Yvonne Cavallé-Reimers (Romania) Diana Enache	(Spain) Yera Campos Molina (Italy) Karin Knapp (France) Alice Tisset (Spain) Carmen López Rueda
November 8	Mallorca, Spain; Clay $10,000; Singles draw – Doubles draw	(Netherlands) Marcella Koek (Netherlands) Eva Wacanno; 6–3 6–2	(Italy) Benedetta Davato (Italy) Federica Quercia	(Spain) Yvonne Cavallé-Reimers (Romania) Diana Enache	(Spain) Yera Campos Molina (Italy) Karin Knapp (France) Alice Tisset (Spain) Carmen López Rueda
November 8	AEGON Pro-Series Loughborough; Loughborough, United Kingdom; Hard $10,000; Singles draw – Doubles draw	(Switzerland) Lara Michel; 6–2 6–2	(United Kingdom) Anna Fitzpatrick	(United Kingdom) Jocelyn Rae (United Kingdom) Tara Moore	(Germany) Mara Nowak (France) Myrtille Georges (Italy) Gioia Barbieri (United Kingdom) Alexandra Walker
November 8	AEGON Pro-Series Loughborough; Loughborough, United Kingdom; Hard $10,000; Singles draw – Doubles draw	(United Kingdom) Jocelyn Rae (United Kingdom) Jade Windley; 6–3, 5–7, [10–4]	(Czech Republic) Jana Jandová (Czech Republic) Petra Krejsová	(United Kingdom) Jocelyn Rae (United Kingdom) Tara Moore	(Germany) Mara Nowak (France) Myrtille Georges (Italy) Gioia Barbieri (United Kingdom) Alexandra Walker
November 8	Antalya, Turkey; Hard $10,000; Singles draw – Doubles draw	(Uzbekistan) Vlada Ekshibarova; 6–2 4–6 6–2	(Romania) Cristina Mitu	(Turkey) Pemra Özgen (Russia) Marta Sirotkina	(Russia) Daria Salnikova (Ukraine) Yuliya Lysa (Netherlands) Lesley Kerkhove (Ukraine) Nadya Kolb
November 8	Antalya, Turkey; Hard $10,000; Singles draw – Doubles draw	(Czech Republic) Nikola Fraňková (Russia) Marta Sirotkina; 3–6 7–5 [10-5]	(Russia) Daria Salnikova (United Kingdom) Nicola Slater	(Turkey) Pemra Özgen (Russia) Marta Sirotkina	(Russia) Daria Salnikova (Ukraine) Yuliya Lysa (Netherlands) Lesley Kerkhove (Ukraine) Nadya Kolb
November 8	Asunción, Paraguay; Clay $10,000; Singles draw – Doubles draw	(Argentina) Vanesa Furlanetto; 1–6 6–4 7–5	(Paraguay) Verónica Cepede Royg	(Brazil) Teliana Pereira (Argentina) Luciana Sarmenti	(Bolivia) María Fernanda Álvarez Terán (Brazil) Nathalia Rossi (Paraguay) Isabella Robbiani (Argentina) Carolina Zeballos
November 8	Asunción, Paraguay; Clay $10,000; Singles draw – Doubles draw	(Paraguay) Verónica Cepede Royg (Argentina) Vanesa Furlanetto; 6–0 6–3	(Argentina) Luciana Sarmenti (Argentina) Carolina Zeballos	(Brazil) Teliana Pereira (Argentina) Luciana Sarmenti	(Bolivia) María Fernanda Álvarez Terán (Brazil) Nathalia Rossi (Paraguay) Isabella Robbiani (Argentina) Carolina Zeballos
November 8	Manila, Philippines; Hard $10,000; Singles draw – Doubles draw	(France) Élodie Rogge-Dietrich; 6–4 6–0	(United States) Yasmin Schnack	(Germany) Katharina Lehnert (Finland) Piia Suomalainen	(Belgium) Gally De Wael (Chinese Taipei) Chen Yi (Thailand) Peangtarn Plipuech (Thailand) Luksika Kumkhum
November 8	Manila, Philippines; Hard $10,000; Singles draw – Doubles draw	(Thailand) Luksika Kumkhum (Thailand) Peangtarn Plipuech; 6–4 7–5	(United States) Ivana King (United States) Yasmin Schnack	(Germany) Katharina Lehnert (Finland) Piia Suomalainen	(Belgium) Gally De Wael (Chinese Taipei) Chen Yi (Thailand) Peangtarn Plipuech (Thailand) Luksika Kumkhum
November 8	Tandil, Argentina; Clay $10,000; Singles draw – Doubles draw	(Chile) Camila Silva; 6–7(5–7) 6–3 6–2	(Argentina) Barbara Rush	(Argentina) Lucía Jara-Lozano (Argentina) Andrea Benítez	(Argentina) Aranza Salut (Germany) Karolina Nowak (Argentina) Tatiana Búa (Argentina) Catalina Pella
November 8	Tandil, Argentina; Clay $10,000; Singles draw – Doubles draw	(Argentina) Lucía Jara-Lozano (Argentina) Carla Lucero; 4–6 6–4 [10-3]	(Argentina) Jordana Lujan (Argentina) Catalina Pella	(Argentina) Lucía Jara-Lozano (Argentina) Andrea Benítez	(Argentina) Aranza Salut (Germany) Karolina Nowak (Argentina) Tatiana Búa (Argentina) Catalina Pella
November 8	Bogotá, Colombia; Clay $10,000; Singles draw – Doubles draw	(Chile) Andrea Koch Benvenuto; 6–1 7–5	(Peru) Patricia Kú Flores	(Chile) Daniela Seguel (Colombia) Karen Ramírez Rivera	(United States) Katie Ruckert (Ecuador) Marie Elise Casares (The Bahamas) Kerrie Cartwright (Colombia) Karen Castiblanco
November 8	Bogotá, Colombia; Clay $10,000; Singles draw – Doubles draw	(Colombia) Karen Castiblanco (Chile) Andrea Koch Benvenuto; 6–4 7–5	(Colombia) Karen Ramírez Rivera (Chile) Daniela Seguel	(Chile) Daniela Seguel (Colombia) Karen Ramírez Rivera	(United States) Katie Ruckert (Ecuador) Marie Elise Casares (The Bahamas) Kerrie Cartwright (Colombia) Karen Castiblanco
November 15	2010 Ritro Slovak Open; Bratislava, Slovakia; Hard $25,000; Singles draw – Doubles draw	(Ukraine) Kateryna Bondarenko; 7–6^{(7–3)} 6–2	(Russia) Evgeniya Rodina	(Germany) Mona Barthel (Slovakia) Zuzana Kučová	(Germany) Sina Haas (Czech Republic) Karolína Plíšková (Czech Republic) Andrea Hlaváčková (Russia) Valeria Savinykh
November 15	2010 Ritro Slovak Open; Bratislava, Slovakia; Hard $25,000; Singles draw – Doubles draw	(Finland) Emma Laine (France) Irena Pavlovic; 6–4 6–4	(France) Claire Feuerstein (Russia) Valeria Savinykh	(Germany) Mona Barthel (Slovakia) Zuzana Kučová	(Germany) Sina Haas (Czech Republic) Karolína Plíšková (Czech Republic) Andrea Hlaváčková (Russia) Valeria Savinykh
November 15	Wellington, New Zealand; Hard $25,000; Singles draw – Doubles draw	(Japan) Erika Sema; 6–2 3–6 6–4	(Bulgaria) Elitsa Kostova	(Australia) Jarmila Groth (Japan) Kumiko Iijima	(Australia) Isabella Holland (Russia) Arina Rodionova (Greece) Eirini Georgatou (Australia) Monika Wejnert
November 15	Wellington, New Zealand; Hard $25,000; Singles draw – Doubles draw	(Hungary) Tímea Babos (Australia) Tammi Patterson; 6–3 6–2	(Australia) Jarmila Groth (Australia) Jade Hopper	(Australia) Jarmila Groth (Japan) Kumiko Iijima	(Australia) Isabella Holland (Russia) Arina Rodionova (Greece) Eirini Georgatou (Australia) Monika Wejnert
November 15	Niterói, Brazil; Clay $25,000; Singles draw – Doubles draw	(Romania) Alexandra Cadanțu; 6–1 1–6 6–1	(United States) Julia Cohen	(Bolivia) María Fernanda Álvarez Terán (France) Alizé Lim	(United States) Chiara Scholl (Austria) Tina Schiechtl (Brazil) Vivian Segnini (Argentina) Paula Ormaechea
November 15	Niterói, Brazil; Clay $25,000; Singles draw – Doubles draw	(Brazil) Maria Fernanda Alves (Brazil) Ana-Clara Duarte; 6–4 6–4	(Brazil) Monique Albuquerque (Brazil) Fernanda Hermenegildo	(Bolivia) María Fernanda Álvarez Terán (France) Alizé Lim	(United States) Chiara Scholl (Austria) Tina Schiechtl (Brazil) Vivian Segnini (Argentina) Paula Ormaechea
November 15	Opole, Poland; Clay $25,000; Singles draw – Doubles draw	(Czech Republic) Sandra Záhlavová; 5–7 7–6(4) 6–4	(Poland) Magda Linette	(Ukraine) Tetyana Arefyeva (Poland) Justyna Jegiołka	(Germany) Justine Ozga (Georgia (country)) Oksana Kalashnikova (Netherlands) Kiki Bertens (Belarus) Iryna Kuryanovich
November 15	Opole, Poland; Clay $25,000; Singles draw – Doubles draw	(Georgia (country)) Oksana Kalashnikova (Belarus) Polina Pekhova; 6–3 6–4	(Poland) Paula Kania (Poland) Magda Linette	(Ukraine) Tetyana Arefyeva (Poland) Justyna Jegiołka	(Germany) Justine Ozga (Georgia (country)) Oksana Kalashnikova (Netherlands) Kiki Bertens (Belarus) Iryna Kuryanovich
November 15	Équeurdreville, France; Hard $10,000; Singles draw – Doubles draw	(France) Jessica Ginier; 7–5 6–2	(France) Clothilde de Bernardi	(France) Irina Ramialison (France) Florence Haring	(France) Myrtille Georges (Netherlands) Nicolette van Uitert (France) Alix Collombon (Belgium) Valerie Verhamme
November 15	Équeurdreville, France; Hard $10,000; Singles draw – Doubles draw	(France) Florence Haring (Madagascar) Nantenaina Ramalalaharivololona; 1–6 6–3 [10–6]	(Netherlands) Kim Kilsdonk (Netherlands) Nicolette van Uitert	(France) Irina Ramialison (France) Florence Haring	(France) Myrtille Georges (Netherlands) Nicolette van Uitert (France) Alix Collombon (Belgium) Valerie Verhamme
November 15	Mallorca, Spain; Clay $10,000; Singles draw – Doubles draw	(Romania) Diana Enache; 6–4 6–2	(Italy) Karin Knapp	(Venezuela) Andrea Gámiz (Spain) Yera Campos Molina	(Switzerland) Clelia Melena (United Kingdom) Amanda Carreras (Portugal) Maria João Koehler (Italy) Federica Quercia
November 15	Mallorca, Spain; Clay $10,000; Singles draw – Doubles draw	(Romania) Diana Enache (Romania) Raluca Elena Platon; 6–3 7–6(3)	(Portugal) Maria João Koehler (Russia) Avgusta Tsybysheva	(Venezuela) Andrea Gámiz (Spain) Yera Campos Molina	(Switzerland) Clelia Melena (United Kingdom) Amanda Carreras (Portugal) Maria João Koehler (Italy) Federica Quercia
November 15	Asunción, Paraguay; Clay $10,000; Singles draw – Doubles draw	(Paraguay) Verónica Cepede Royg; 6–2 6–2	(Argentina) Tatiana Búa	(Argentina) Vanesa Furlanetto (Germany) Karolina Nowak	(Argentina) Lucía Jara-Lozano (Argentina) Carolina Zeballos (Paraguay) Isaura Enrique Aguilar (Argentina) Jordana Lujan
November 15	Asunción, Paraguay; Clay $10,000; Singles draw – Doubles draw	(Paraguay) Verónica Cepede Royg (Argentina) Vanesa Furlanetto; 6–2 2–6 [10-3]	(Argentina) Lucía Jara-Lozano (Argentina) Luciana Sarmenti	(Argentina) Vanesa Furlanetto (Germany) Karolina Nowak	(Argentina) Lucía Jara-Lozano (Argentina) Carolina Zeballos (Paraguay) Isaura Enrique Aguilar (Argentina) Jordana Lujan
November 15	Quito, Ecuador; Clay $10,000; Singles draw – Doubles draw	(Ecuador) Marie Elise Casares; 6–2 7–5	(Ecuador) Doménica González	(United States) Denise Starr (United States) Dina Bajramovic	(Brazil) Beatriz Maria Martins Cecato (Peru) Ingrid Várgas Calvo (Brazil) Karina Souza (United States) Katie Ruckert
November 15	Quito, Ecuador; Clay $10,000; Singles draw – Doubles draw	(Peru) Mariana Demichelli Vergara (United States) Katie Ruckert; 6–1 6–7(5) [10–7]	(Brazil) Beatriz Maria Martins Cecato (Brazil) Karina Souza	(United States) Denise Starr (United States) Dina Bajramovic	(Brazil) Beatriz Maria Martins Cecato (Peru) Ingrid Várgas Calvo (Brazil) Karina Souza (United States) Katie Ruckert
November 15	Hyōgo, Japan; Carpet $10,000; Singles draw – Doubles draw	(China) Wang Qiang; 6–1 6–4	(Japan) Yurina Koshino	(Japan) Miyabi Inoue (Japan) Makoto Ninomiya	(Japan) Hirono Watanabe (Japan) Mari Inoue (Japan) Makiho Kozawa (Japan) Kanae Hisami
November 15	Hyōgo, Japan; Carpet $10,000; Singles draw – Doubles draw	(Japan) Chinami Ogi (Japan) Shiho Otake; 7–5 6–2	(Japan) Kanae Hisami (Japan) Yurina Koshino	(Japan) Miyabi Inoue (Japan) Makoto Ninomiya	(Japan) Hirono Watanabe (Japan) Mari Inoue (Japan) Makiho Kozawa (Japan) Kanae Hisami
November 22	Dunlop World Challenge; Toyota, Aichi, Japan; Carpet $75,000+H; Singles – Doubles	(Japan) Misaki Doi; 7–5 6–2	(Japan) Junri Namigata	(Japan) Ayumi Morita (Croatia) Mirjana Lučić	(Germany) Kathrin Wörle (Thailand) Noppawan Lertcheewakarn (Japan) Erika Takao (Japan) Sachie Ishizu
November 22	Dunlop World Challenge; Toyota, Aichi, Japan; Carpet $75,000+H; Singles – Doubles	(Japan) Shuko Aoyama (Japan) Rika Fujiwara; 1–6 6–3 [11-9]	(Romania) Irina-Camelia Begu (Romania) Mădălina Gojnea	(Japan) Ayumi Morita (Croatia) Mirjana Lučić	(Germany) Kathrin Wörle (Thailand) Noppawan Lertcheewakarn (Japan) Erika Takao (Japan) Sachie Ishizu
November 22	Traralgon, Australia; Hard $25,000; Singles draw – Doubles draw	(Israel) Julia Glushko; 2–6 7–5 7–6(4)	(New Zealand) Sacha Jones	(Australia) Jarmila Groth (Greece) Eirini Georgatou	(Hungary) Tímea Babos (United States) Amanda Fink (Australia) Sally Peers (Peru) Bianca Botto
November 22	Traralgon, Australia; Hard $25,000; Singles draw – Doubles draw	(Hungary) Tímea Babos (United Kingdom) Melanie South; 6–3 6–2	(Australia) Jarmila Groth (Australia) Jade Hopper	(Australia) Jarmila Groth (Greece) Eirini Georgatou	(Hungary) Tímea Babos (United States) Amanda Fink (Australia) Sally Peers (Peru) Bianca Botto
November 22	Přerov, Czech Republic; Hard $25,000; Singles draw – Doubles draw	(Czech Republic) Renata Voráčová; 4–6 6–3 7–5	(France) Claire Feuerstein	(Slovenia) Maša Zec Peškirič (Czech Republic) Sandra Záhlavová	(Croatia) Ivana Lisjak (Germany) Laura Siegemund (Germany) Julia Babilon (France) Irena Pavlovic
November 22	Přerov, Czech Republic; Hard $25,000; Singles draw – Doubles draw	(Czech Republic) Iveta Gerlová (Czech Republic) Lucie Kriegsmannová; 6–1 6–3	(Poland) Olga Brózda (Poland) Natalia Kołat	(Slovenia) Maša Zec Peškirič (Czech Republic) Sandra Záhlavová	(Croatia) Ivana Lisjak (Germany) Laura Siegemund (Germany) Julia Babilon (France) Irena Pavlovic
November 22	La Vall d'Uixó, Spain; Clay $10,000; Singles draw – Doubles draw	(Russia) Nanuli Pipiya; 7–5, 7–6^{(8–6)}	(Spain) Lara Arruabarrena Vecino	(Venezuela) Andrea Gámiz (Russia) Anna Arina Marenko	(Spain) Rocío de la Torre Sánchez (Romania) Diana Stomlega (United Kingdom) Amanda Carreras (Mexico) Ximena Hermoso
November 22	La Vall d'Uixó, Spain; Clay $10,000; Singles draw – Doubles draw	(United Kingdom) Amanda Carreras (Venezuela) Andrea Gámiz; 7–6^{(7–5)}, 6–3	(Spain) Lara Arruabarrena Vecino (Italy) Benedetta Davato	(Venezuela) Andrea Gámiz (Russia) Anna Arina Marenko	(Spain) Rocío de la Torre Sánchez (Romania) Diana Stomlega (United Kingdom) Amanda Carreras (Mexico) Ximena Hermoso
November 22	Asunción, Paraguay; Clay $10,000; Singles draw – Doubles draw	(Spain) Inés Ferrer Suárez; 6–2 6–2	(Spain) Eva Fernández Brugués	(Austria) Tina Schiechtl (Germany) Karolina Nowak	(Argentina) Daniela Degano (Paraguay) Verónica Cepede Royg (Argentina) Luciana Sarmenti (Argentina) Estefania Donnet
November 22	Asunción, Paraguay; Clay $10,000; Singles draw – Doubles draw	(Argentina) Andrea Benítez (Argentina) Tatiana Búa; 6–2 6–4	(Argentina) Lucía Jara-Lozano (Argentina) Luciana Sarmenti	(Austria) Tina Schiechtl (Germany) Karolina Nowak	(Argentina) Daniela Degano (Paraguay) Verónica Cepede Royg (Argentina) Luciana Sarmenti (Argentina) Estefania Donnet
November 22	Barueri, Brazil; Hard $10,000; Singles draw – Doubles draw	(Switzerland) Conny Perrin; 5-0 Retired	(Romania) Alexandra Cadanțu	(Brazil) Paula Cristina Gonçalves (Chile) Andrea Koch Benvenuto	(United States) Megan Falcon (Argentina) Aranza Salut (Bolivia) María Fernanda Álvarez Terán (Brazil) Vivian Segnini
November 22	Barueri, Brazil; Hard $10,000; Singles draw – Doubles draw	(Brazil) Fernanda Faria (Brazil) Paula Cristina Gonçalves; 7–5 4–6 [10-3]	(Bolivia) María Fernanda Álvarez Terán (Argentina) Aranza Salut	(Brazil) Paula Cristina Gonçalves (Chile) Andrea Koch Benvenuto	(United States) Megan Falcon (Argentina) Aranza Salut (Bolivia) María Fernanda Álvarez Terán (Brazil) Vivian Segnini
November 22	Concepción, Chile; Clay $10,000; Singles draw – Doubles draw	(Chile) Camila Silva; 6–4 6–2	(Netherlands) Josanne van Bennekom	(Czech Republic) Kateřina Kramperová (Venezuela) Gabriela Coglitore	(Colombia) Karen Castiblanco (Chile) Romina Brante (United States) Katie Ruckert (Mexico) Nadia Abdala
November 22	Concepción, Chile; Clay $10,000; Singles draw – Doubles draw	(Chile) Fernanda Brito (Chile) Daniela Seguel; 6–2 6–3	(Colombia) Karen Castiblanco (Chile) Camila Silva	(Czech Republic) Kateřina Kramperová (Venezuela) Gabriela Coglitore	(Colombia) Karen Castiblanco (Chile) Romina Brante (United States) Katie Ruckert (Mexico) Nadia Abdala
November 29	Rio de Janeiro, Brazil; Clay $25,000; Singles draw – Doubles draw	(Romania) Alexandra Cadanțu; 6–1 6–3	(United States) Julia Cohen	(Spain) Eva Fernández Brugués (Switzerland) Conny Perrin	(Brazil) Vivian Segnini (Brazil) Ana-Clara Duarte (Austria) Melanie Klaffner (Argentina) Mailen Auroux
November 29	Rio de Janeiro, Brazil; Clay $25,000; Singles draw – Doubles draw	(Brazil) Maria Fernanda Alves (Brazil) Ana-Clara Duarte; Default	(France) Alizé Lim (Argentina) Paula Ormaechea	(Spain) Eva Fernández Brugués (Switzerland) Conny Perrin	(Brazil) Vivian Segnini (Brazil) Ana-Clara Duarte (Austria) Melanie Klaffner (Argentina) Mailen Auroux
November 29	Bendigo, Australia; Hard $25,000; Singles draw – Doubles draw	(Hungary) Tímea Babos; 3–6 6–3 7–5	(Bulgaria) Elitsa Kostova	(Australia) Tammi Patterson (New Zealand) Sacha Jones	(Japan) Erika Sema (United Kingdom) Lisa Whybourn (United States) Jennifer Elie (Greece) Eirini Georgatou
November 29	Bendigo, Australia; Hard $25,000; Singles draw – Doubles draw	(Hungary) Tímea Babos (United Kingdom) Melanie South; 6–3 6–2	(Australia) Jarmila Groth (Australia) Jade Hopper	(Australia) Tammi Patterson (New Zealand) Sacha Jones	(Japan) Erika Sema (United Kingdom) Lisa Whybourn (United States) Jennifer Elie (Greece) Eirini Georgatou
November 29	Vinaròs, Spain; Clay $10,000; Singles draw – Doubles draw	(Spain) Lara Arruabarrena Vecino; 6–2 6–0	(Romania) Cristina Dinu	(Russia) Nanuli Pipiya (Spain) Rocío de la Torre Sánchez	(Greece) Despina Papamichail (Italy) Valentine Confalonieri (Spain) Olga Sáez Larra (Switzerland) Viktorija Golubic
November 29	Vinaròs, Spain; Clay $10,000; Singles draw – Doubles draw	(Spain) Arabela Fernández Rabener (Russia) Anna Arina Marenko; 7–6(4) 7–5	(Romania) Cristina Dinu (Romania) Ionela-Andreea Iova	(Russia) Nanuli Pipiya (Spain) Rocío de la Torre Sánchez	(Greece) Despina Papamichail (Italy) Valentine Confalonieri (Spain) Olga Sáez Larra (Switzerland) Viktorija Golubic
November 29	Mandya, India; Hard $10,000; Singles draw – Doubles draw	(Ukraine) Anastasiya Vasylyeva; 6–2 3–6 6–2	(Thailand) Luksika Kumkhum	(United Kingdom) Emily Webley-Smith (India) Poojashree Venkatesha	(Thailand) Nungnadda Wannasuk (Ukraine) Anna Shkudun (India) Sharmada Balu (Russia) Anna Rapoport
November 29	Mandya, India; Hard $10,000; Singles draw – Doubles draw	(Thailand) Peangtarn Plipuech (Thailand) Nungnadda Wannasuk; 6–1 6–1	(India) Rushmi Chakravarthi (India) Poojashree Venkatesha	(United Kingdom) Emily Webley-Smith (India) Poojashree Venkatesha	(Thailand) Nungnadda Wannasuk (Ukraine) Anna Shkudun (India) Sharmada Balu (Russia) Anna Rapoport
November 29	Santiago, Chile; Clay $10,000; Singles draw – Doubles draw	(Chile) Andrea Koch Benvenuto; 6–2 6–2	(Paraguay) Verónica Cepede Royg	(Chile) Camila Silva (Germany) Karolina Nowak	(Chile) Fernanda Brito (Argentina) Barbara Rush (Argentina) Luciana Sarmenti (United States) Alexandra Hirsch
November 29	Santiago, Chile; Clay $10,000; Singles draw – Doubles draw	(Paraguay) Verónica Cepede Royg (Argentina) Luciana Sarmenti; 6–1 6–3	(Argentina) Barbara Rush (Chile) Camila Silva	(Chile) Camila Silva (Germany) Karolina Nowak	(Chile) Fernanda Brito (Argentina) Barbara Rush (Argentina) Luciana Sarmenti (United States) Alexandra Hirsch
November 29	Ain Elsokhna, Egypt; Clay $10,000; Singles draw – Doubles draw	(South Africa) Chanel Simmonds; 6–4 6–7(5) 7–6(6)	(Serbia) Ana Jovanović	(Russia) Galina Fokina (Hungary) Vaszilisza Bulgakova	(Egypt) Magy Aziz (Ukraine) Nadya Kolb (Russia) Aleksandra Romanova (Ukraine) Anastasia Kharchenko
November 29	Ain Elsokhna, Egypt; Clay $10,000; Singles draw – Doubles draw	(Russia) Galina Fokina (Russia) Marina Melnikova; 6–3 2–6 [13-11]	(Italy) Indra Bigi (Italy) Nicole Clerico	(Russia) Galina Fokina (Hungary) Vaszilisza Bulgakova	(Egypt) Magy Aziz (Ukraine) Nadya Kolb (Russia) Aleksandra Romanova (Ukraine) Anastasia Kharchenko

== December ==
Week of	Tournament	Winner	Runners-up	Semifinalists	Quarterfinalists
December 6	Bangalore, India; Hard $25,000; Singles draw – Doubles draw	(Thailand) Nicha Lertpitaksinchai; 6–4 6–3	(Japan) Kumiko Iijima	(France) Kristina Mladenovic (Thailand) Peangtarn Plipuech	(Slovenia) Dalila Jakupovič (Israel) Julia Glushko (Ukraine) Anna Shkudun (Ukraine) Anastasiya Vasylyeva
December 6	Bangalore, India; Hard $25,000; Singles draw – Doubles draw	(Thailand) Luksika Kumkhum (Thailand) Nungnadda Wannasuk; 7–6(5) 5–7 [10-8]	(Chinese Taipei) Chen Yi (Japan) Kumiko Iijima	(France) Kristina Mladenovic (Thailand) Peangtarn Plipuech	(Slovenia) Dalila Jakupovič (Israel) Julia Glushko (Ukraine) Anna Shkudun (Ukraine) Anastasiya Vasylyeva
December 6	Dubai, United Arab Emirates; Hard $10,000; Singles draw – Doubles draw	(Russia) Marta Sirotkina; 6–0 6–0	(Romania) Mihaela Buzărnescu	(Germany) Julia Babilon (Ukraine) Yuliana Fedak	(United Kingdom) Naomi Broady (Russia) Elena Chalova (Ukraine) Tetyana Arefyeva (Germany) Korina Perkovic
December 6	Dubai, United Arab Emirates; Hard $10,000; Singles draw – Doubles draw	(Russia) Elena Chalova (Kyrgyzstan) Ksenia Palkina; 6–2 6–4	(Ukraine) Tetyana Arefyeva (Ukraine) Yuliana Fedak	(Germany) Julia Babilon (Ukraine) Yuliana Fedak	(United Kingdom) Naomi Broady (Russia) Elena Chalova (Ukraine) Tetyana Arefyeva (Germany) Korina Perkovic
December 6	Havana, Cuba; Hard $10,000; Singles draw – Doubles draw	(Russia) Nadejda Guskova; 6–1 6–2	(Cuba) Misleydis Díaz González	(United Kingdom) Jennifer Allan (Trinidad and Tobago) Yolande Leacock	(United Kingdom) Nicola George (Slovenia) Anja Prislan (Brazil) Lara Ruffel (Israel) Ester Masuri
December 6	Havana, Cuba; Hard $10,000; Singles draw – Doubles draw	(Cuba) Misleydis Díaz González (Cuba) Yamile Fors Guerra; 6–1 6–2	(United Kingdom) Jennifer Allan (Russia) Nadejda Guskova	(United Kingdom) Jennifer Allan (Trinidad and Tobago) Yolande Leacock	(United Kingdom) Nicola George (Slovenia) Anja Prislan (Brazil) Lara Ruffel (Israel) Ester Masuri
December 6	Benicarló, Spain; Clay $10,000; Singles draw – Doubles draw	(Venezuela) Andrea Gámiz; 3–6 6–2 6–4	(Italy) Anastasia Grymalska	(Italy) Andreea Văideanu (Russia) Nanuli Pipiya	(United Kingdom) Amanda Carreras (Italy) Valentine Confalonieri (Romania) Raluca Elena Platon (Spain) Arabela Fernández Rabener
December 6	Benicarló, Spain; Clay $10,000; Singles draw – Doubles draw	(Spain) Arabela Fernández Rabener (Russia) Anna Arina Marenko; 6–3 7–6(1)	(Italy) Anastasia Grymalska (Italy) Andreea Văideanu	(Italy) Andreea Văideanu (Russia) Nanuli Pipiya	(United Kingdom) Amanda Carreras (Italy) Valentine Confalonieri (Romania) Raluca Elena Platon (Spain) Arabela Fernández Rabener
December 6	Ain Elsokhna, Egypt; Clay $10,000; Singles draw – Doubles draw	(Ukraine) Sofiya Kovalets; 6–0 6–2	(Serbia) Ana Jovanović	(Czech Republic) Zuzana Linhová (Italy) Nicole Clerico	(Russia) Aleksandra Romanova (France) Chloé Paquet (Russia) Marina Melnikova (Czech Republic) Darina Šeděnková
December 6	Ain Elsokhna, Egypt; Clay $10,000; Singles draw – Doubles draw	(Ukraine) Sofiya Kovalets (South Africa) Chanel Simmonds; 6–1 6–2	(Russia) Galina Fokina (Russia) Marina Melnikova	(Czech Republic) Zuzana Linhová (Italy) Nicole Clerico	(Russia) Aleksandra Romanova (France) Chloé Paquet (Russia) Marina Melnikova (Czech Republic) Darina Šeděnková
December 6	Talca, Chile; Clay $10,000; Singles draw – Doubles draw	(Paraguay) Verónica Cepede Royg; 7–6(2) 3–6 6–3	(Chile) Camila Silva	(Chile) Fernanda Brito (Chile) Andrea Koch Benvenuto	(Argentina) Carla Lucero (Venezuela) Adriana Pérez (Argentina) Carolina Zeballos (Czech Republic) Kateřina Kramperová
December 6	Talca, Chile; Clay $10,000; Singles draw – Doubles draw	(Paraguay) Verónica Cepede Royg (Argentina) Luciana Sarmenti; 6–3 6–1	(Brazil) Flávia Guimarães Bueno (Chile) Belén Ludueña	(Chile) Fernanda Brito (Chile) Andrea Koch Benvenuto	(Argentina) Carla Lucero (Venezuela) Adriana Pérez (Argentina) Carolina Zeballos (Czech Republic) Kateřina Kramperová
December 13	Al Habtoor Tennis Challenge; Dubai, United Arab Emirates; Hard $75,000; Singles – Doubles	(India) Sania Mirza; 4–6 6–3 6–0	(Serbia) Bojana Jovanovski	(Russia) Evgeniya Rodina (Spain) Anabel Medina Garrigues	(Germany) Julia Görges (Germany) Tatjana Malek (Ukraine) Maryna Zanevska (Latvia) Anastasija Sevastova
December 13	Al Habtoor Tennis Challenge; Dubai, United Arab Emirates; Hard $75,000; Singles – Doubles	(Germany) Julia Görges (Croatia) Petra Martić; 64- 7–6(7)	(India) Sania Mirza (Czech Republic) Vladimíra Uhlířová	(Russia) Evgeniya Rodina (Spain) Anabel Medina Garrigues	(Germany) Julia Görges (Germany) Tatjana Malek (Ukraine) Maryna Zanevska (Latvia) Anastasija Sevastova
December 20	Gimcheon, South Korea; Hard $10,000; Singles draw – Doubles draw	(South Korea) Kim Kun-hee; 4–6 6–1 6–3	(South Korea) Hong Hyun-hui	(South Korea) Kim Na-ri (South Korea) Kim Sun-jung	(South Korea) Kim Ji-sun (South Korea) Jeong Yoon-young (Japan) Ai Koga (South Korea) Kang Seo-kyung
December 20	Gimcheon, South Korea; Hard $10,000; Singles draw – Doubles draw	(South Korea) Hong Hyun-hui (South Korea) Kim Kun-hee; 6–4 7–5	(South Korea) Kim Ji-young (South Korea) Kim Jung-eun	(South Korea) Kim Na-ri (South Korea) Kim Sun-jung	(South Korea) Kim Ji-sun (South Korea) Jeong Yoon-young (Japan) Ai Koga (South Korea) Kang Seo-kyung
December 20	Pune, India; Hard $25,000; Singles draw – Doubles draw	(Serbia) Bojana Jovanovski; 6–4 6–4	(Russia) Nina Bratchikova	(Ukraine) Anna Shkudun (Russia) Alexandra Panova	(Slovenia) Tadeja Majerič (United Kingdom) Emily Webley-Smith (Japan) Sachie Ishizu (Slovenia) Anja Prislan
December 20	Pune, India; Hard $25,000; Singles draw – Doubles draw	(Russia) Nina Bratchikova (Russia) Alexandra Panova; 6–3 7–6(2)	(Japan) Sachie Ishizu (Ukraine) Anna Shkudun	(Ukraine) Anna Shkudun (Russia) Alexandra Panova	(Slovenia) Tadeja Majerič (United Kingdom) Emily Webley-Smith (Japan) Sachie Ishizu (Slovenia) Anja Prislan

== See also ==
- 2010 ITF Women's Circuit
- 2010 ITF Women's Circuit (January–March)
- 2010 ITF Women's Circuit (April–June)
- 2010 ITF Women's Circuit (July–September)
- 2010 WTA Tour
