= 2010 Al Habtoor Tennis Challenge – Doubles =

Doubles
- 2010 Al Habtoor Tennis Challenge

Final
- Champions: (Germany) Julia Görges (Croatia) Petra Martić
- Runners-up: (India) Sania Mirza (Czech Republic) Vladimíra Uhlířová
- Score: 6-4, 7-6(7)

Events
| Singles | Doubles |
| ← 2009 · | Al Habtoor Tennis Challenge | · 2011 → |

Julia Görges and Oksana Kalashnikova were the defending champions, but chose not to defend their title together. Görges played alongside Petra Martić whereas Kalashnikova played with Marta Sirotkina.

Kalashnikova and Sirotkina lost in the semifinals to Görges and Martić.

Görges and Martić won in the final, beating Sania Mirza and Vladimíra Uhlířová 6-4, 7-6(7).

== Seeds ==
1. (India) Sania Mirza / (Czech Republic) Vladimíra Uhlířová (final)
2. (Germany) Julia Görges / (Croatia) Petra Martić (champions)
3. (Russia) Vitalia Diatchenko / (Russia) Alexandra Panova (first round)
4. (Austria) Sandra Klemenschits / (Germany) Tatjana Malek (first round)

== Draw ==
=== Key ===
- Q = Qualifier
- WC = Wild card
- LL = Lucky loser
- Alt = Alternate
- SE = Special exempt
- PR = Protected ranking
- ITF = ITF entry
- JE = Junior exempt
- w/o = Walkover
- r = Retired
- d = Defaulted
- SR = Special ranking

=== Draw ===
First round
1 | (India) S Mirza (Czech Republic) V Uhlířová | 7^{7} | 6
(Russia) E Chalova (Kyrgyzstan) K Palkina | 6^{5} | 4
(Russia) N Bratchikova (Finland) E Laine | 6 | 6
WC | (Serbia) B Jovanovski (Serbia) S Sabljarević | 3 | 1
3 | (Russia) V Diatchenko (Russia) A Panova | 0 | 1
(United States) L Lee-Waters (United States) M Moulton-Levy | 6 | 6
WC | (United Kingdom) T Moore (United Kingdom) K O'Brien | 3 | 6^{6}
(United Kingdom) S Borwell (Russia) V Savinykh | 6 | 7^{8}
(Russia) E Rodina (Turkey) İ Şenoğlu | 3 | 6^{3}
(Georgia (country)) O Kalashnikova (Russia) M Sirotkina | 6 | 7^{7}
(Russia) K Pervak (Ukraine) L Tsurenko | 7 | 7^{7}
4 | (Austria) S Klemenschits (Germany) T Malek | 5 | 6^{3}
(Germany) J Babilon (Germany) K Perkovic | 6 | 7^{7}
(Croatia) D Jurak (Switzerland) S Vögele | 4 | 6^{5}
(Latvia) L Dekmeijere (Latvia) A Sevastova | 0 | 6^{3}
2 | (Germany) J Görges (Croatia) P Martić | 6 | 7^{7}

Quarterfinals
1 | (India) S Mirza (Czech Republic) V Uhlířová | 6 | 6
(Russia) N Bratchikova (Finland) E Laine | 3 | 4
(United States) L Lee-Waters (United States) M Moulton-Levy | 6 | 6
(United Kingdom) S Borwell (Russia) V Savinykh | 2 | 3
(Georgia (country)) O Kalashnikova (Russia) M Sirotkina | 6 | 1
(Russia) K Pervak (Ukraine) L Tsurenko | 2 | 1 | r
(Germany) J Babilon (Germany) K Perkovic | 3 | 6 | [5]
2 | (Germany) J Görges (Croatia) P Martić | 6 | 4 | [10]

Semifinals
1 | (India) S Mirza (Czech Republic) V Uhlířová | 2 | 7 | [10]
(United States) L Lee-Waters (United States) M Moulton-Levy | 6 | 5 | [5]
(Georgia (country)) O Kalashnikova (Russia) M Sirotkina | 5 | 6^{7}
2 | (Germany) J Görges (Croatia) P Martić | 7 | 7^{9}

Final
1 | (India) S Mirza (Czech Republic) V Uhlířová | 4 | 6^{7}
2 | (Germany) J Görges (Croatia) P Martić | 6 | 7^{9}
