= 2010 Al Habtoor Tennis Challenge – Singles =

Singles
- 2010 Al Habtoor Tennis Challenge

Final
- Champion: (India) Sania Mirza
- Runner-up: (Serbia) Bojana Jovanovski
- Score: 4-6, 6-3, 6-0

Events
Singles	Doubles
← 2009 ·	Al Habtoor Tennis Challenge	· 2011 →

Regina Kulikova was the defending champion, but chose not to participate that year.

Sania Mirza won in the final, defeating Bojana Jovanovski 4-6, 6-3, 6-0.

== Seeds ==
1. (Germany) Julia Görges (quarterfinals)
2. (Latvia) Anastasija Sevastova (quarterfinals)
3. (Austria) Sybille Bammer (second round)
4. (Spain) Anabel Medina Garrigues (semifinals)
5. (Serbia) Bojana Jovanovski (final)
6. (Russia) Ksenia Pervak (first round)
7. (Austria) Patricia Mayr-Achleitner (first round)
8. (Russia) Evgeniya Rodina (semifinals)

== Draw ==
=== Key ===
- Q = Qualifier
- WC = Wild card
- LL = Lucky loser
- Alt = Alternate
- SE = Special exempt
- PR = Protected ranking
- ITF = ITF entry
- JE = Junior exempt
- w/o = Walkover
- r = Retired
- d = Defaulted
- SR = Special ranking

=== Finals ===
Semifinals
(India) Sania Mirza	6	4	6
8	(Russia) Evgeniya Rodina	3	6	4
4	(Spain) Anabel Medina Garrigues	0	7^{7}	3
5	(Serbia) Bojana Jovanovski	6	6^{5}	6

Final
(India) Sania Mirza	4	6	6
5	(Serbia) Bojana Jovanovski	6	3	0

=== Top half ===
First round
1	(Germany) J Görges	7	2	6
(Luxembourg) A Kremer	5	6	4
(France) C de Gubernatis	7	1	6^{1}
Q	(United Kingdom) A Fitzpatrick	5	6	7^{7}
WC	(Belgium) T Hendler	1	2	r
Q	(Germany) K Perkovic	6	2
(India) S Mirza	6	6
6	(Russia) K Pervak	2	3
3	(Austria) S Bammer	6	4	6
(Switzerland) S Vögele	4	6	1
(Russia) E Bychkova	5	4
(Germany) T Malek	7	6
(France) K Mladenovic	6	6
(Russia) A Panova	1	4
(France) S Beltrame	3	0
8	(Russia) E Rodina	6	6

Second round
1	(Germany) J Görges	2	6	6
Q	(United Kingdom) A Fitzpatrick	6	1	2
Q	(Germany) K Perkovic	1	2
(India) S Mirza	6	6
3	(Austria) S Bammer	4	5
(Germany) T Malek	6	7
(France) K Mladenovic	2	2
8	(Russia) E Rodina	6	6

Quarter Finals
1	(Germany) J Görges	1	6^{8}
(India) S Mirza	6	7^{10}
(Germany) T Malek	4	0
8	(Russia) E Rodina	6	6

Semi Final
(India) S Mirza	6	4	6
8	(Russia) E Rodina	3	6	4

=== Bottom half ===
First round
7	(Austria) P Mayr-Achleitner	6^{4}	1
(United States) L Lee-Waters	7^{7}	6
Q	(Ukraine) M Zanevska	6	6
WC	(Croatia) S Njirić	2	1
WC	(Russia) V Savinykh	1	6	2
(Ukraine) L Tsurenko	6	4	6
Q	(Romania) A Cadanţu	5	2
4	(Spain) A Medina Garrigues	7	6
5	(Serbia) B Jovanovski	6	6^{3}	6
WC	(Germany) J Babilon	4	7^{7}	1
(Croatia) P Martić	6	6
(Russia) N Bratchikova	2	2
(Russia) V Diatchenko	7	6
(United Kingdom) K O'Brien	5	3
(Georgia (country)) O Kalashnikova	5	6	6^{3}
2	(Latvia) A Sevastova	7	2	7^{7}

Second round
(United States) L Lee-Waters	7^{10}	2	0
Q	(Ukraine) M Zanevska	6^{8}	6	6
(Ukraine) L Tsurenko	3	2
4	(Spain) A Medina Garrigues	6	6
5	(Serbia) B Jovanovski	6^{4}	6	6
(Croatia) P Martić	7^{7}	3	1
(Russia) V Diatchenko	4	4
2	(Latvia) A Sevastova	6	6

Quarter Finals
Q	(Ukraine) M Zanevska	4	3
4	(Spain) A Medina Garrigues	6	6
5	(Serbia) B Jovanovski	6	5	6
2	(Latvia) A Sevastova	3	7	0

Semi Final
4	(Spain) A Medina Garrigues	0	7^{7}	3
5	(Serbia) B Jovanovski	6	6^{5}	6
