= 2010 Al Habtoor Tennis Challenge =

- Date: December 13–19
- Edition: 12th
- Location: (United Arab Emirates) Dubai

Champions

Singles
- (India) Sania Mirza

Doubles
- (Germany) Julia Görges / (Croatia) Petra Martić
← 2009 ·	Al Habtoor Tennis Challenge	· 2011 →

The 2010 Al Habtoor Tennis Challenge was a women's tennis tournament on the 2010 ITF Women's Circuit under the tier of the 2010 WTA Tour. It took place in Dubai from 13–19 December. The prize money was US$75,000.

== WTA entrants ==
=== Seeds ===
Country	Player	Seed
GER	Julia Görges	1
LAT	Anastasija Sevastova	2
AUT	Sybille Bammer	3
ESP	Anabel Medina Garrigues	4
SRB	Bojana Jovanovski	5
RUS	Ksenia Pervak	6
AUT	Patricia Mayr-Achleitner	7
RUS	Evgeniya Rodina	8

=== Other entrants ===
==== Wildcards ====
The following players received wildcards into the singles main draw:

- (Croatia) Silvia Njirić
- (Belgium) Tamaryn Hendler
- (Russia) Valeria Savinykh
- (Germany) Julia Babilon

==== Qualifiers ====
The following players received entry from the qualifying draw:

- (United Kingdom) Anna Fitzpatrick
- (Germany) Korina Perkovic
- (Ukraine) Maryna Zanevska
- (Romania) Alexandra Cadanţu

== Singles champion ==
(India) Sania Mirza def. (Serbia) Bojana Jovanovski, 4-6, 6-3, 6-0

== Doubles champions ==
(Germany) Julia Görges / (Croatia) Petra Martić def. (India) Sania Mirza / (Czech Republic) Vladimíra Uhlířová, 6-4, 7-6(7)
