= 2010 OEC Taipei Ladies Open – Doubles =

Doubles
- 2010 OEC Taipei Ladies Open

Final
- Champions: (Chinese Taipei) Chang Kai-chen (Chinese Taipei) Chuang Chia-jung
- Runners-up: (Chinese Taipei) Hsieh Su-wei (India) Sania Mirza
- Score: 6–4, 6–2

Events
| Singles | Doubles |
- OEC Taipei Ladies Open

Chan Yung-jan and Chuang Chia-jung were the defending champions, but Chan decided not to participate that year.

Chuang successfully defended her title alongside Chang Kai-chen, defeating Hsieh Su-wei and Sania Mirza 6–4, 6–2 in the final.

== Seeds ==
1. (China) Peng Shuai / (China) Yan Zi (semifinals)
2. (Chinese Taipei) Hsieh Su-wei / (India) Sania Mirza (final)
3. (Chinese Taipei) Chang Kai-chen / (Chinese Taipei) Chuang Chia-jung (champions)
4. (Australia) Jarmila Groth / (Thailand) Tamarine Tanasugarn (semifinals)

== Draw ==
Key

- Q = Qualifier
- WC = Wild card
- LL = Lucky loser
- Alt = Alternate
- ITF = ITF entry
- PR = Protected ranking
- SR = Special ranking
- SE = Special exempt
- JE = Junior exempt
- JR = Junior Accelerator Programme entrant
- CO = College Accelerator Programme entrant
- NG = Next Gen Accelerator Program entrant
- w/o = Walkover
- r = Retired
- d = Defaulted

=== Draw ===
First round
1 | (China) S Peng (China) Z Yan | 6 | 6
WC | (Chinese Taipei) C-f Liu (China) Z Yang | 3 | 3
(Indonesia) Y Basuki (Indonesia) J Rompies | 6 | 6
(South Korea) S-h Han (Japan) Y Nakano | 3 | 4
3 | (Chinese Taipei) K-c Chang (Chinese Taipei) C-j Chuang | 6 | 6
(Chinese Taipei) H-c Chan (China) S Zheng | 4 | 2
WC | (Chinese Taipei) S-y Hsieh (Chinese Taipei) H-c Lee | 1 | 3
(Romania) E Bogdan (Thailand) N Lertcheewakarn | 6 | 6
(Chinese Taipei) Y Chen (China) S Liu | 3 | 3
(Ukraine) Y Beygelzimer (Russia) K Lykina | 6 | 6
WC | (Vietnam) PĐT Huỳnh (Chinese Taipei) T-f Juan | 4 | 2
4 | (Australia) J Groth (Thailand) T Tanasugarn | 6 | 6
(Chinese Taipei) S-y Kao (Hong Kong) L Zhang | 6 | 3 | [10]
(Chinese Taipei) W-h Hsu (Australia) A Molik | 2 | 6 | [7]
(Chinese Taipei) C-w Chan (Japan) K Iijima | 1 | 5
2 | (Chinese Taipei) S-w Hsieh (India) S Mirza | 6 | 7

Quarterfinals
1 | (China) S Peng (China) Z Yan | 6 | 6
(Indonesia) Y Basuki (Indonesia) J Rompies | 3 | 2
3 | (Chinese Taipei) K-c Chang (Chinese Taipei) C-j Chuang | 7^{9} | 6
(Romania) E Bogdan (Thailand) N Lertcheewakarn | 6^{7} | 3
(Ukraine) Y Beygelzimer (Russia) K Lykina | 3 | 3
4 | (Australia) J Groth (Thailand) T Tanasugarn | 6 | 6
(Chinese Taipei) S-y Kao (Hong Kong) L Zhang | 3 | 3
2 | (Chinese Taipei) S-w Hsieh (India) S Mirza | 6 | 6

Semifinals
1 | (China) S Peng (China) Z Yan | 6 | 2 | [5]
3 | (Chinese Taipei) K-c Chang (Chinese Taipei) C-j Chuang | 1 | 6 | [10]
4 | (Australia) J Groth (Thailand) T Tanasugarn | 6 | 4 | [8]
2 | (Chinese Taipei) S-w Hsieh (India) S Mirza | 4 | 6 | [10]

Final
3 | (Chinese Taipei) K-c Chang (Chinese Taipei) C-j Chuang | 6 | 6
2 | (Chinese Taipei) S-w Hsieh (India) S Mirza | 4 | 2
