= 2010 OEC Taipei Ladies Open =

- Date: November 1 – November 7
- Edition: 3rd
- Surface: Carpet (i)
- Location: Taipei City, Taiwan

Champions

Singles
- (China) Peng Shuai

Doubles
- (Chinese Taipei) Chang Kai-chen / (Chinese Taipei) Chuang Chia-jung
- Taipei Open

The 2010 OEC Taipei Ladies Open was a women's professional tennis tournament played on indoor carpet courts. It was the third edition of the OEC Taipei Ladies Open, and was part of the $100,000 tournaments of the 2010 ITF Women's Circuit. It took place at the Taipei Arena in Taipei City, Taiwan, from November 1 to November 7, 2010.

== WTA entrants ==
=== Seeds ===
Country	Player	Rank^{1}	Seed
AUS	Jarmila Groth	43	1
THA	Tamarine Tanasugarn	61	2
SRB	Bojana Jovanovski	72	3
JPN	Ayumi Morita	76	4
CHN	Peng Shuai	95	5
AUS	Alicia Molik	110	6
TPE	Chang Kai-chen	112	7
JPN	Junri Namigata	133	8

- Rankings as of October 25, 2010.

=== Other entrants ===
The following players received wildcards into the singles main draw:

- (Chinese Taipei) Chan Chin-wei
- (Chinese Taipei) Chen Yi
- (Chinese Taipei) Chuang Chia-jung
- (China) Yan Zi

The following players received entry from the qualifying draw:

- (Chinese Taipei) Juan Ting-fei
- (Japan) Yumi Nakano
- (Indonesia) Jessy Rompies
- (United States) Yasmin Schnack

The following player received entry via the Junior Exempt (JE) spot:

- (France) Kristina Mladenovic

== Champions ==
=== Singles ===
(China) Peng Shuai def. (Japan) Ayumi Morita, 6–1, 6–4.

- It was Peng's 1st title of the year and the 8th of her career.

=== Doubles ===
(Chinese Taipei) Chang Kai-chen / (Chinese Taipei) Chuang Chia-jung def. (Chinese Taipei) Hsieh Su-wei / (India) Sania Mirza, 6–4, 6–2.

- It was Chang's 2nd title of the year and 7th of her career
- It was Chuang's 1st title of the year and 30th of her career
