= 2010 OEC Taipei Ladies Open – Singles =

Singles
- 2010 OEC Taipei Ladies Open

Final
- Champion: (China) Peng Shuai
- Runner-up: (Japan) Ayumi Morita
- Score: 6–1, 6–4

Events
Singles	Doubles
- OEC Taipei Ladies Open

Chan Yung-jan was the defending champion, but decided not to participate.

Peng Shuai won the title, defeating Ayumi Morita 6–1, 6–4 in the final.

== Seeds ==
1. (Australia) Jarmila Groth (semifinals)
2. (Thailand) Tamarine Tanasugarn (semifinals)
3. (Serbia) Bojana Jovanovski (quarterfinals)
4. (Japan) Ayumi Morita (final)
5. (China) Peng Shuai (champion)
6. (Australia) Alicia Molik (first round)
7. (Chinese Taipei) Chang Kai-chen (quarterfinals)
8. (Japan) Junri Namigata (quarterfinals)

== Draw ==
Key

- Q = Qualifier
- WC = Wild card
- LL = Lucky loser
- Alt = Alternate
- ITF = ITF entry
- PR = Protected ranking
- SR = Special ranking
- SE = Special exempt
- JE = Junior exempt
- JR = Junior Accelerator Programme entrant
- CO = College Accelerator Programme entrant
- NG = Next Gen Accelerator Program entrant
- w/o = Walkover
- r = Retired
- d = Defaulted

=== Finals ===
Semifinals
1	(Australia) Jarmila Groth	4	6	5
4	(Japan) Ayumi Morita	6	2	7
5	(China) Peng Shuai	7^{9}	7^{7}
2	(Thailand) Tamarine Tanasugarn	6^{7}	6^{4}

Final
4	(Japan) Ayumi Morita	1	4
5	(China) Peng Shuai	6	6

=== Top half ===
First round
1	(Australia) J Groth	6	6
Q	(United States) Y Schnack	2	3
(Thailand) N Luangnam	2	1
(Ukraine) Y Beygelzimer	6	6
(Chinese Taipei) S-w Hsieh	6	6^{3}	7
JE	(France) K Mladenovic	2	7^{7}	5
WC	(Chinese Taipei) C-j Chuang	2	1
7	(Chinese Taipei) K-c Chang	6	6
4	(Japan) A Morita	6	6
Q	(Chinese Taipei) T-f Juan	2	2
(Kazakhstan) Z Diyas	6	1	3
(Romania) M Gojnea	1	6	6
(Hong Kong) L Zhang	6	6
Q	(Japan) Y Nakano	0	3
(China) Q Wang	6	6
6	(Australia) A Molik	2	0

Second round
1	(Australia) J Groth	6	6
(Ukraine) Y Beygelzimer	4	4
(Chinese Taipei) S-w Hsieh	2	7^{7}	4
7	(Chinese Taipei) K-c Chang	6	6^{2}	6
4	(Japan) A Morita	6	6^{4}	6
(Romania) M Gojnea	2	7^{7}	4
(Hong Kong) L Zhang	6^{3}	3
(China) Q Wang	7^{7}	6

Quarter Finals
1	(Australia) J Groth	7^{8}	4	6
7	(Chinese Taipei) K-c Chang	6^{6}	6	4
4	(Japan) A Morita	6	6
(China) Q Wang	2	1

Semi Final
1	(Australia) J Groth	4	6	5
4	(Japan) A Morita	6	2	7

=== Bottom half ===
First round
5	(China) S Peng	6	7^{7}
(Chinese Taipei) W-h Hsu	2	6^{4}
WC	(China) Z Yan	6	4	6
(South Korea) S-h Han	2	6	2
(Russia) K Lykina	1	1
(Thailand) N Lertcheewakarn	6	6
(India) S Mirza	3	4
3	(Serbia) B Jovanovski	6	6
8	(Japan) J Namigata	6	4	6
WC	(Chinese Taipei) C-w Chan	3	6	4
WC	(Chinese Taipei) Y Chen	6^{9}	1
(Romania) E Bogdan	7^{11}	6
(Japan) K Iijima	6	6
Q	(Indonesia) J Rompies	4	2
(China) S Liu	2	1
2	(Thailand) T Tanasugarn	6	6

Second round
5	(China) S Peng	7	6
WC	(China) Z Yan	5	1
(Thailand) N Lertcheewakarn	6	4	1
3	(Serbia) B Jovanovski	0	6	6
8	(Japan) J Namigata	6	6^{7}	6
(Romania) E Bogdan	3	7^{9}	3
(Japan) K Iijima	1	1
2	(Thailand) T Tanasugarn	6	6

Quarter Finals
5	(China) S Peng	6	3	6
3	(Serbia) B Jovanovski	1	6	0
8	(Japan) J Namigata	3	1
2	(Thailand) T Tanasugarn	6	6

Semi Final
5	(China) S Peng	7^{9}	7^{7}
2	(Thailand) T Tanasugarn	6^{7}	6^{4}
