= Elena Chalova =

Russian tennis player

- Country (sports): Russia
- Residence: Ufa, Russia
- Born: 16 May 1987 (age 37); Ufa
- Height: 1.71 m (5 ft 7 in)
- Turned pro: 2003
- Retired: 2012
- Plays: Right (two-handed backhand)
- Prize money: $111,293

Singles
- Career record: 174–108
- Career titles: 8 ITF
- Highest ranking: No. 151 (9 November 2009)

Doubles
- Career record: 103–79
- Career titles: 9 ITF
- Highest ranking: No. 133 (14 June 2010)

Elena Valeryevna Chalova (Елена Валерьевна Чалова, born 16 May 1987) is a Russian former tennis player.

Elena was born to Valeri Chalov and Irina Chalova, and has a brother named Michael. She started played tennis at the age of seven.

On 9 November 2009, she reached her career-high singles ranking of world No. 151. On 14 June 2010, she peaked at No. 133 in the doubles rankings.

== ITF finals ==
$100,000 tournaments
$75,000 tournaments
$50,000 tournaments
$25,000 tournaments
$10,000 tournaments

=== Singles: 11 (8–3) ===
Result	No.	Date	Tournament	Surface	Opponent	Score
Win	1.	21 June 2004	ITF Protvino, Russia	Hard	(Russia) Vasilisa Bardina	6–2, 6–1
Win	2.	4 July 2005	ITF Krasnoarmeysk, Russia	Hard	(Russia) Irina Bulykina	6–4, 6–0
Win	3.	8 August 2005	ITF Rebecq, Belgium	Clay	(France) Noémie Scharle	6–1, ret.
Win	4.	12 September 2005	ITF Lleida, Spain	Clay	(Spain) Núria Roig	6–2, 3–6, 7–6^{(1)}
Win	5.	16 July 2006	ITF Chongquing, China	Hard	(China) Zhang Shuai	6–4, 4–6, 6–2
Loss	1.	4 February 2008	ITF Vale do Lobo, Portugal	Hard	(Slovakia) Dominika Nociarová	2–6, 0–6
Win	6.	18 February 2008	ITF Portimão, Portugal	Hard	(Russia) Nina Bratchikova	6–4, 6–4
Win	7.	10 March 2008	ITF Cairo, Egypt	Clay	(Romania) Alexandra Cadanţu	6–2, 6–3
Loss	2.	10 March 2009	ITF Las Palmas, Spain	Hard	(United Kingdom) Emily Webley-Smith	0–6, 6–7^{(5)}
Loss	3.	17 May 2009	Kurume Cup, Japan	Grass	(Russia) Ksenia Lykina	5–7, 3–6
Win	8.	27 July 2009	ITF Almaty, Kazakhstan	Hard	(Georgia (country)) Oksana Kalashnikova	6–3, 6–4

=== Doubles: 21 (9–12) ===
Result	No.	Date	Tournament	Surface	Partner	Opponents	Score
Loss	1.	27 June 2004	ITF Protvino, Russia	Hard	(Israel) Maria Gugel	(Russia) Vasilisa Bardina (Russia) Julia Efremova	3–6, 2–6
Loss	2.	6 June 2005	ITF Warsaw, Poland	Clay	(Ukraine) Veronika Kapshay	(Poland) Olga Brózda (Poland) Natalia Kołat	1–6, 4–6
Loss	3.	21 June 2005	ITF Bucharest, Romania	Clay	(Russia) Ekaterina Lopes	(Romania) Corina Corduneanu (Romania) Gabriela Niculescu	2–6, 4–6
Loss	4.	4 July 2005	ITF Krasnoarmeysk, Russia	Hard	(Russia) Ekaterina Lopes	(Russia) Anna Bastrikova (Russia) Julia Efremova	2–6, 6–7
Loss	5.	19 July 2005	ITF Düsseldorf, Germany	Clay	(Serbia and Montenegro) Danica Krstajić	(Poland) Olga Brózda (Poland) Monika Schneider	6–1, 1–6, 2–6
Loss	6.	31 July 2005	ITF Horb, Germany	Clay	(Uzbekistan) Ivanna Israilova	(Czech Republic) Lucie Kriegsmannová (Czech Republic) Zuzana Zálabská	4–6, 3–6
Win	1.	2 August 2005	ITF Bad Saulgau, Germany	Clay	(Uzbekistan) Ivanna Israilova	(Bosnia and Herzegovina) Sandra Martinović (Croatia) Darija Jurak	6–4, 4–6, 6–4
Win	2.	6 September 2005	ITF Durmersheim, Germany	Clay	(Montenegro) Danica Krstajić	(Germany) Adriana Barna (Germany) Caroline Schneider	4–6, 6–4, 6–4
Loss	7.	28 May 2006	ITF Campobasso, Italy	Clay	(Czech Republic) Renata Voráčová	(Czech Republic) Nikola Fraňková (Russia) Alisa Kleybanova	w/o
Loss	8.	11 February 2008	ITF Albufeira, Portugal	Hard	(Slovakia) Martina Babáková	(Israel) Julia Glushko (Russia) Marina Melnikova	3–6, 6–0, [9–11]
Loss	9.	24 February 2008	ITF Portimão, Portugal	Hard	(Armenia) Liudmila Nikoyan	(France) Émilie Bacquet (Netherlands) Chayenne Ewijk	w/o
Loss	10.	10 March 2008	ITF Cairo, Egypt	Clay	(Russia) Inna Sokolova	(Georgia (country)) Oksana Kalashnikova (Russia) Galina Fokina	4–6, 2–6
Win	3.	20 October 2008	Lagos Open, Nigeria	Hard	(Russia) Valeria Savinykh	(India) Rushmi Chakravarthi (India) Isha Lakhani	6–7, 6–3, [10–7]
Loss	11.	19 December 2008	Dubai Challenge, United Arab Emirates	Hard	(Russia) Valeria Savinykh	(Slovenia) Maša Zec Peškirič (France) Irena Pavlovic	6–7^{(6)}, 6–3, [3–10]
Win	4.	19 January 2009	ITF Kaarst, Germany	Carpet (i)	(Russia) Marina Melnikova	(Germany) Julia Babilon (Germany) Franziska Etzel	6–3, 6–2
Loss	12.	11 July 2009	Zagreb Ladies Open, Croatia	Clay	(Russia) Anastasia Poltoratskaya	(Croatia) Darija Jurak (Czech Republic) Renata Voráčová	2–6, 5–7
Win	5.	13 July 2009	ITF Zwevegem, Belgium	Clay	(Croatia) Darija Jurak	(Japan) Yurika Sema (France) Aurélie Védy	6–1, 6–4
Win	6.	1 August 2009	ITF Almaty, Kazakhstan	Hard	(Georgia (country)) Oksana Kalashnikova	(Russia) Nina Bratchikova (Romania) Ágnes Szatmári	6–1, 6–0
Win	7.	7 September 2009	ITF Denain, France	Clay	(Russia) Ksenia Lykina	(Poland) Magdalena Kiszczyńska (Serbia) Teodora Mirčić	6–4, 6–3
Win	8.	5 October 2009	Open de Limoges, France	Hard (i)	(Georgia (country)) Oksana Kalashnikova	(France) Florence Haring (France) Violette Huck	4–6, 6–3, [10–4]
Win	9.	6 December 2010	Dubai Challenge, United Arab Emirates	Hard	(Kyrgyzstan) Ksenia Palkina	(Ukraine) Tetyana Arefyeva (Ukraine) Yuliana Fedak	6–2, 6–4
