= Korina Perkovic =

German tennis player

- Country (sports): Germany
- Born: 14 April 1987 (age 38); Frankfurt, West Germany
- Height: 1.70 m (5 ft 7 in)
- Prize money: $51,808

Singles
- Career record: 173–116
- Career titles: 3 ITF
- Highest ranking: No. 339 (2 April 2007)

Doubles
- Career record: 71–55
- Career titles: 7 ITF
- Highest ranking: No. 299 (28 April 2008)

Korina Perkovic (Serbo-Croatian: Korina Perković, pronounced [korǐːna pěːrkoʋitɕ]; born 14 April 1987) is a German former tennis player.

In her career, she won three singles and seven doubles titles on the ITF Women's Circuit. On 2 April 2007, she reached her best singles ranking of world No. 339. On 28 April 2008, she peaked at No. 299 in the doubles rankings.

== ITF Circuit finals ==
=== Singles: 7 (3 titles, 4 runner-ups) ===
Legend $50,000 tournaments $25,000 tournaments $10,000 tournaments	Finals by surface Hard (0–1) Clay (2–3) Carpet (1–0)

Result	No.	Date	Tournament	Surface	Opponent	Score
Loss	1.	11 July 2005	ITF Garching, Germany	Clay	(Croatia) Josipa Bek	7–5, 1–6, 1–6
Win	1.	30 June 2008	ITF Cremona, Italy	Clay	(France) Aurélie Védy	6–1, 6–4
Win	2.	2 March 2009	ITF Buchen, Germany	Carpet (i)	(Italy) Romina Oprandi	6–3, 7–6^{(7–0)}
Win	3.	24 August 2009	ITF Braunschweig, Germany	Clay	(Croatia) Matea Mezak	2–6, 6–3, 6–2
Loss	2.	16 August 2010	ITF Wahlstedt, Germany	Clay	(Poland) Barbara Sobaszkiewicz	0–6, 6–7^{(6–8)}
Loss	3.	14 February 2011	ITF Leimen, Germany	Hard (i)	(Italy) Gioia Barbieri	4–6, 2–6
Loss	4.	27 June 2011	ITF Stuttgart, Germany	Clay	(Hungary) Tímea Babos	6–1, 2–6, 3–6

=== Doubles: 11 (7 titles, 4 runner-ups) ===
Legend $50,000 tournaments $25,000 tournaments $10,000 tournaments	Finals by surface Hard (2–1) Clay (4–3) Carpet (1–0)

Result	No.	Date	Tournament	Surface	Partner	Opponents	Score
Win	1.	17 January 2005	ITF Oberhaching, Germany	Carpet (i)	(Germany) Kristina Barrois	(Czech Republic) Lucie Hradecká (Czech Republic) Zuzana Zálabská	6–3, 5–7, 7–6^{(8–6)}
Loss	1.	28 February 2005	ITF Buchen, Germany	Hard (i)	(Germany) Andrea Petkovic	(Bosnia and Herzegovina) Mervana Jugić-Salkić (Croatia) Darija Jurak	2–6, 2–6
Win	2.	25 April 2005	ITF Cavtat, Croatia	Clay	(Croatia) Ivana Lisjak	(Slovenia) Meta Sevšek (Slovenia) Ana Skafar	6–4, 7–6^{(7–2)}
Win	3.	22 August 2005	ITF Bielefeld, Germany	Clay	(Germany) Kristina Barrois	(Germany) Justine Ozga (Germany) Andrea Sieveke	7–6^{(7–1)}, 6–3
Win	4.	6 March 2006	ITF Sunderland, Great Britain	Hard (i)	(Germany) Carmen Klaschka	(Sweden) Nadja Roma (Finland) Piia Suomalainen	6–2, 6–3
Loss	2.	4 September 2006	ITF Düsseldorf, Germany	Clay	(Germany) Lisa Steinbach	(Germany) Franziska Etzel (Germany) Laura Zelder	1–6, 7–6^{(9–7)}, 2–6
Win	5.	7 May 2007	ITF Antalya, Turkey	Hard	(Turkey) İpek Şenoğlu	(United Kingdom) Anna Smith (Brazil) Roxane Vaisemberg	7–6^{(7–1)}, 6–4
Win	6.	14 May 2007	ITF Antalya, Turkey	Clay	(Turkey) İpek Şenoğlu	(United Kingdom) Anna Fitzpatrick (Serbia) Ana Veselinović	1–6, 6–1, 6–4
Win	7.	13 July 2009	ITF Darmstadt, Germany	Clay	(Germany) Valentina Stephan	(Russia) Anastasia Meglinskaya (Czech Republic) Michaela Paštiková	7–5, 6–4
Loss	3.	19 July 2010	ITF Horb, Germany	Clay	(Germany) Anna Zaja	(Czech Republic) Simona Dobrá (Czech Republic) Lucie Kriegsmannová	6–4, 6–7^{(5–7)}, [8–10]
Loss	4.	1 August 2011	Ladies Open Hechingen, Germany	Clay	(Germany) Laura Siegemund	(Austria) Sandra Klemenschits (Germany) Tatjana Malek	6–4, 2–6, [7–10]
