= Julia Babilon =

German former professional tennis player

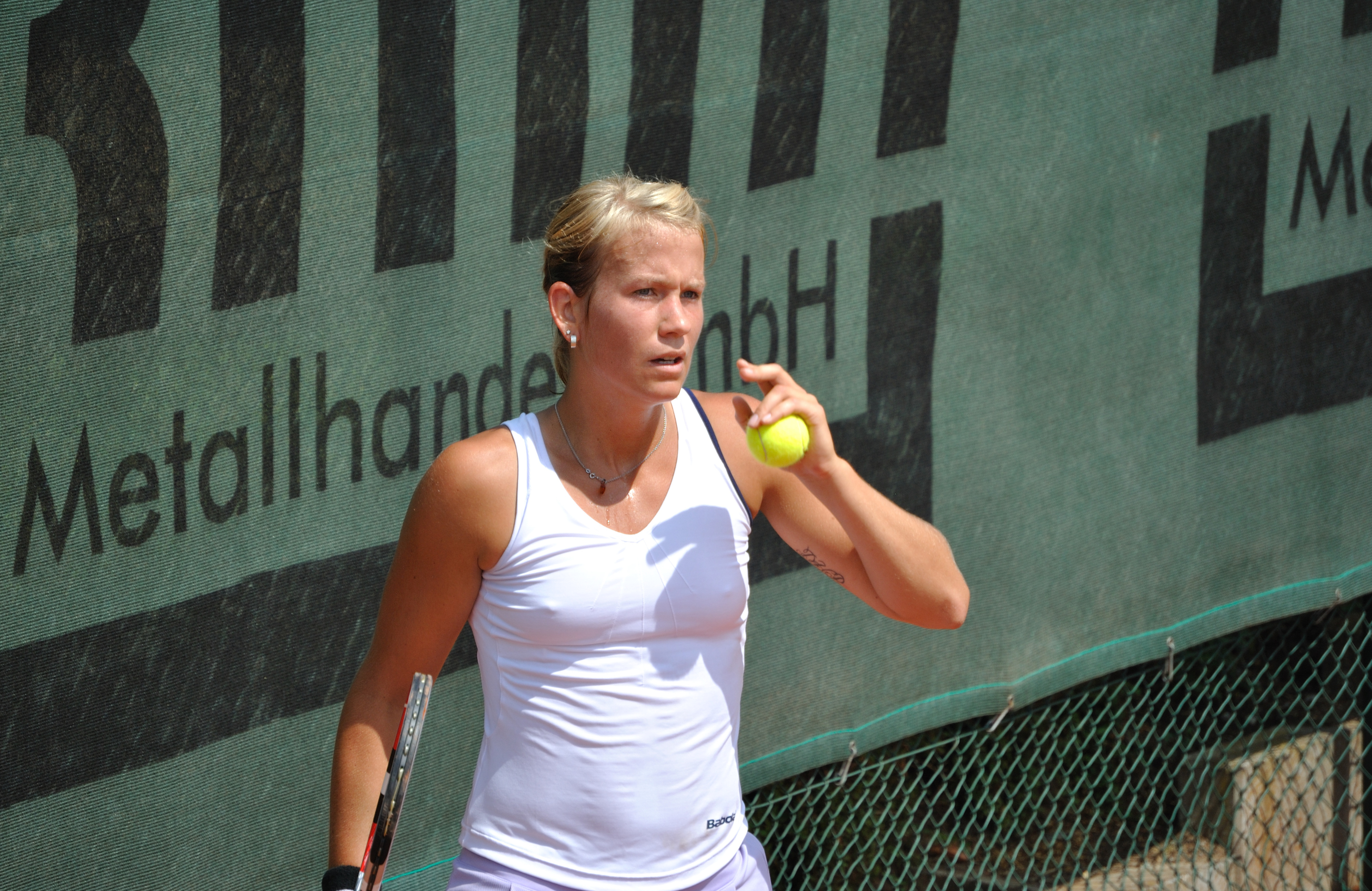
- Country (sports): Germany
- Born: 14 July 1984 (age 40); Düsseldorf, West Germany
- Turned pro: 2000
- Plays: Right (two-handed backhand)
- Prize money: $35,138

Singles
- Career record: 133–85
- Career titles: 5 ITF
- Highest ranking: No. 357 (20 June 2005)

Doubles
- Career record: 19–25
- Career titles: 0
- Highest ranking: No. 510 (8 August 2005)

Julia Babilon (born 14 July 1984) is a German former professional tennis player.

In her career, she won five singles titles on the ITF Women's Circuit.

On 20 June 2005, she achieved her career-high singles ranking of world No. 357. On 8 August 2005, she peaked at No. 510 in the WTA doubles rankings.

== ITF finals ==
$25,000 tournaments
$10,000 tournaments

=== Singles (5–5) ===
Result	No.	Date	Location	Surface	Opponent	Score
Loss	1.	20 June 2004	Lenzerheide, Switzerland	Clay	(Czech Republic) Kateřina Böhmová	4–6, 4–6
Win	2.	12 August 2007	Rebecq, Belgium	Clay	(France) Samantha Schoeffel	6–2, 6–0
Loss	3.	9 September 2007	Düsseldorf, Germany	Clay	(Germany) Franziska Etzel	6–4, 3–6, 2–6
Win	4.	29 March 2009	Gonesse, France	Clay (i)	(Poland) Magdalena Kiszczyńska	3–6, 6–3, 6–4
Loss	5.	5 April 2009	Antalya, Turkey	Hard	(France) Samantha Schoeffel	7–6^{(8)}, 1–0 ret.
Win	6.	10 May 2009	Wiesbaden, Germany	Clay	(Croatia) Darija Jurak	6–1, 6–2
Win	7.	2 August 2009	Bree, Belgium	Clay	(Ukraine) Yevgeniya Kryvoruchko	6–3, 7–5
Win	8.	30 August 2009	Pörtschach, Austria	Clay	(Italy) Alexia Virgili	6–2, 6–2
Loss	9.	17 January 2010	Glasgow, UK	Hard (i)	(Germany) Sarah Gronert	6–2, 2–6, 1–6
Loss	10.	20 June 2010	Cologne, Germany	Clay	(Poland) Sandra Zaniewska	4–6, 4–6

=== Doubles (0–2) ===
Result	No.	Date	Location	Surface	Partner	Opponents	Score
Loss	1.	21 May 2005	Tenerife, Spain	Hard	(Germany) Adriana Barna	(United Kingdom) Amanda Janes (United Kingdom) Anne Keothavong	6–7^{(5)}, 6–3, 3–6
Loss	2.	25 January 2009	Kaarst, Germany	Carpet (i)	(Germany) Franziska Etzel	(Russia) Marina Melnikova (Russia) Elena Chalova	3–6, 2–6
