= 2005 Gaz de France Stars – Doubles =

Doubles
- 2005 Gaz de France Stars

Final
- Champion: (France) Émilie Loit (Slovenia) Katarina Srebotnik
- Runner-up: (Netherlands) Michaëlla Krajicek (Hungary) Ágnes Szávay
- Score: 6–3, 6–4

Details
- Draw: 16
- Seeds: 4

Events
Singles	Doubles
← 2004 ·	Gaz de France Stars	· 2006 →

The doubles Tournament at the 2005 Gaz de France Stars took place in late October, 2005, on indoor hard courts in Hasselt, Belgium.

Jennifer Russell and Mara Santangelo were the defending champions, but competed with different partners. Russell paired up with Eleni Daniilidou, but lost in the quarterfinals; Santangelo partnered with Roberta Vinci, also losing in the quarterfinals.

Émilie Loit and Katarina Srebotnik emerged as the winners.

== Seeds ==
1. N/A (team withdrew)
2. (France) Émilie Loit / (Slovenia) Katarina Srebotnik (winners)
3. (Greece) Eleni Daniilidou / (United States) Jennifer Russell (quarterfinals)
4. (Italy) Maria Elena Camerin / (Spain) Nuria Llagostera Vives (semifinals)
5. (Italy) Mara Santangelo / (Italy) Roberta Vinci (quarterfinals)

== Results ==
=== Key ===
- Q = Qualifier
- WC = Wild card
- LL = Lucky loser
- Alt = Alternate
- ITF = ITF entry
- PR = Protected ranking
- SR = Special ranking
- SE = Special exempt
- JE = Junior exempt
- JR = Junior Accelerator Programme entrant
- CO = College Accelerator Programme entrant
- NG = Next Gen Accelerator Program entrant
- w/o = Walkover
- r = Retired
- d = Defaulted

=== Draw ===
First round
5	(Italy) M Santangelo (Italy) R Vinci	6	6
(Poland) K Jans (Poland) A Rosolska	0	1
WC	(Belgium) K Flipkens (Belgium) C Maes	5	1
WC	(Belgium) E Callens (Belgium) K Clijsters	7	6
3	(Greece) E Daniilidou (United States) J Russell	7	4	6
(Germany) J Schruff (Germany) J Wöhr	6^{9}	6	3
LL	(Belgium) L Butkiewicz (Netherlands) K Kilsdonk	3	4
(Netherlands) M Krajicek (Hungary) Á Szávay	6	6
Q	(Belarus) E Dzehalevich (Serbia and Montenegro) D Krstajić	6	6
LL	(Belgium) J de Vries (Belgium) D Feys	4	4
(United States) N Uberoi (India) S Uberoi	4	2
4	(Italy) ME Camerin (Spain) N Llagostera Vives	6	6
(Russia) An Rodionova (Russia) G Voskoboeva	4	2
(Belarus) T Poutchek (Belarus) A Yakimova	6	6
(Russia) E Bychkova (France) S Foretz	2	1
2	(France) É Loit (Slovenia) K Srebotnik	6	6

Quarterfinals
5	(Italy) M Santangelo (Italy) R Vinci
WC	(Belgium) E Callens (Belgium) K Clijsters	w/o
3	(Greece) E Daniilidou (United States) J Russell	1	2
(Netherlands) M Krajicek (Hungary) Á Szávay	6	6
Q	(Belarus) E Dzehalevich (Serbia and Montenegro) D Krstajić	2	2
4	(Italy) ME Camerin (Spain) N Llagostera Vives	6	6
(Belarus) T Poutchek (Belarus) A Yakimova	3	1
2	(France) É Loit (Slovenia) K Srebotnik	6	6

Semifinals
WC	(Belgium) E Callens (Belgium) K Clijsters	6^{5}	6	5
(Netherlands) M Krajicek (Hungary) Á Szávay	7	4	7
4	(Italy) ME Camerin (Spain) N Llagostera Vives	1	3
2	(France) É Loit (Slovenia) K Srebotnik	6	6

Final
(Netherlands) M Krajicek (Hungary) Á Szávay	3	4
2	(France) É Loit (Slovenia) K Srebotnik	6	6
