= 2004 Gaz de France Stars – Doubles =

Doubles
- 2004 Gaz de France Stars

Final
- Champion: (United States) Jennifer Russell (Italy) Mara Santangelo
- Runner-up: (Spain) Nuria Llagostera Vives (Spain) Marta Marrero
- Score: 6–3, 7–5

Details
- Draw: 16
- Seeds: 4

Events
Singles	Doubles
Gaz de France Stars	· 2005 →

The doubles Tournament at the 2004 Gaz de France Stars took place in late September to early October, 2004, on indoor hard courts in Hasselt, Belgium.

Jennifer Russell and Mara Santangelo won the title.

== Seeds ==
The top two seeds get a bye into round two.

1. (Croatia) Jelena Kostanić / (Luxembourg) Claudine Schaul (quarterfinals)
2. (Australia) Lisa McShea / (Ukraine) Tatiana Perebiynis (first round)
3. (Italy) Tathiana Garbin / (Slovenia) Tina Križan (first round)
4. (Czech Republic) Olga Blahotová / (Czech Republic) Gabriela Chmelinová (first round)

== Results ==
=== Key ===
- Q = Qualifier
- WC = Wild card
- LL = Lucky loser
- Alt = Alternate
- ITF = ITF entry
- PR = Protected ranking
- SR = Special ranking
- SE = Special exempt
- JE = Junior exempt
- JR = Junior Accelerator Programme entrant
- CO = College Accelerator Programme entrant
- NG = Next Gen Accelerator Program entrant
- w/o = Walkover
- r = Retired
- d = Defaulted

=== Draw ===
First round
1	(Croatia) J Kostanić (Luxembourg) C Schaul	6	6
Q	(Belgium) J de Vries (Belgium) D Feys	0	1
(Czech Republic) M Paštiková (Russia) An Rodionova	6	7
(Bulgaria) D Krastevitch (Italy) V Sassi	1	5
4	(Czech Republic) O Blahotová (Czech Republic) G Chmelinová	5	6^{5}
(Spain) N Llagostera Vives (Spain) M Marrero	7	7
WC	(Belgium) L Butkiewicz (Belgium) E Vanhyfte	4	3
(Germany) V Henke (Germany) M Müller	6	6
(Hungary) K Marosi (Brazil) M Tavares	4	5
(Czech Republic) I Benešová (Czech Republic) D Chládková	6	7
(Italy) ME Camerin (Germany) A Rösch	6	7
3	(Italy) T Garbin (Slovenia) T Križan	3	6^{7}
(United States) L Lee-Waters (Germany) C Schneider	4	4
(Czech Republic) E Birnerová (Czech Republic) L Průšová	6	6
(United States) J Russell (Italy) M Santangelo	4	6	6
2	(Australia) L McShea (Ukraine) T Perebiynis	6	3	4

Quarterfinals
1	(Croatia) J Kostanić (Luxembourg) C Schaul	4	4
(Czech Republic) M Paštiková (Russia) An Rodionova	6	6
(Spain) N Llagostera Vives (Spain) M Marrero	7	6
(Germany) V Henke (Germany) M Müller	5	4
(Czech Republic) I Benešová (Czech Republic) D Chládková	6	3	3
(Italy) ME Camerin (Germany) A Rösch	2	6	6
(Czech Republic) E Birnerová (Czech Republic) L Průšová	3	0
(United States) J Russell (Italy) M Santangelo	6	6

Semifinals
(Czech Republic) M Paštiková (Russia) An Rodionova	1	3
(Spain) N Llagostera Vives (Spain) M Marrero	6	6
(Italy) ME Camerin (Germany) A Rösch	6	2	3
(United States) J Russell (Italy) M Santangelo	2	6	6

Final
(Spain) N Llagostera Vives (Spain) M Marrero	3	5
(United States) J Russell (Italy) M Santangelo	6	7
