= Kim Kilsdonk =

Dutch tennis player (born 1979)

- Country (sports): Netherlands
- Born: 31 March 1979 (age 45); Haarlem
- Turned pro: 1997
- Retired: 2016
- Plays: Left-handed (two-handed backhand)
- Prize money: $51,943

Singles
- Career record: 63–67
- Career titles: 1 ITF
- Highest ranking: No. 347 (15 February 1999)

Doubles
- Career record: 248–144
- Career titles: 30 ITF
- Highest ranking: No. 144 (1 August 2005)

Kim Kilsdonk (born 31 March 1979) is a Dutch former professional tennis player.

In her career, she won one singles title and 30 doubles titles on the ITF Circuit. Her highest singles ranking is world No. 347, which she reached in February 1999. Her career-high in doubles is 144, achieved August 2005.

Kilsdonk made her WTA Tour main-draw debut 2003 at the indoor event in Paris, in the doubles event, partnering Sophie Lefèvre.

She retired from professional tennis in 2016.

== Career ==
In October 2004, Kilsdonk partnered Leanne Baker and the duo lost in the semifinals of the Luxembourg Open. They were beaten in two sets by Jill Craybas and Marlene Weingärtner.

In February 2005, Kilsdonk partnered Claire Curran and the duo lost in the first round of the Open Gaz de France. They were beaten by Iveta Benešová and Květa Peschke. Following this, they headed to Antwerp to compete in the Proximus Diamond Games. There, they won two matches to qualify and then went on to beat Francesca Lubiani and Marta Marrero in the first round. They lost to Anabel Medina Garrigues and Dinara Safina in the quarterfinals, in straight sets. This was followed by a run to the semifinals at the İstanbul Cup partnering Claire Curran where they lost to Sandra and Daniela Klemenschits.

In October 2006, at Hasselt, Kilsdonk partnered Elise Tamaëla. The duo lost in the quarterfinals; they were beaten by Eleni Daniilidou and Jasmin Wöhr.

In September 2007, Kilsdonk partnered Sophie Lefèvre and the duo lost in the quarterfinals of the Guangzhou International Open to Anabel Medina Garrigues and Virginia Ruano Pascual.

== ITF Circuit finals ==
=== Singles: 2 (1 title, 1 runner-up) ===
Legend $25,000 tournaments $10,000 tournaments	Finals by surface Hard (1–0) Clay (0–1)

Result	No.	Date	Tournament	Surface	Opponent	Score
Win	1.	23 March 1998	ITF Ashkelon, Israel	Hard	(Ukraine) Tatiana Perebiynis	6–1, 3–6, 6–3
Loss	1.	16 March 2003	ITF Amiens, France	Clay (i)	(Germany) Syna Schmidle	6–7^{(5)}, 2–6

=== Doubles: 55 (30 titles, 25 runner-ups) ===
Legend $50,000 tournaments $25,000 tournaments $10,000 tournaments	Finals by surface Hard (14–8) Clay (14–16) Carpet (2–1)

Result	No.	Date	Tournament	Surface	Partner	Opponents	Score
Win	1.	9 June 1997	ITF Bossonnens, Switzerland	Clay	(Netherlands) Jolanda Mens	(Switzerland) Laura Bao (Switzerland) Caecilia Charbonnier	6–4, 6–2
Win	1.	16 June 1997	ITF Klosters, Switzerland	Clay	(Netherlands) Jolanda Mens	(Uruguay) Elena Juricich (Venezuela) Milagros Sequera	6–7^{(8)}, 6–4, 6–2
Loss	1.	29 June 1997	ITF Velp, Netherlands	Clay	(Netherlands) Jolanda Mens	(Bulgaria) Galina Dimitrova (Bulgaria) Dessislava Topalova	7–5, 5–7, 4–6
Loss	2.	5 July 1997	ITF Hoorn, Netherlands	Clay	(Netherlands) Jolanda Mens	(Netherlands) Yvette Basting (Slovakia) Simona Galikova	1–6, 6–1, 4–6
Win	3.	4 August 1997	ITF Rebecq, Belgium	Clay	(Netherlands) Jolanda Mens	(Sweden) Annica Lindstedt (Netherlands) Annemarie Mikkers	6–3, 6–4
Win	4.	12 January 1998	ITF Reykjavík, Iceland	Carpet (i)	(Netherlands) Jolanda Mens	(Czech Republic) Olga Blahotová (Czech Republic) Gabriela Navrátilová	6–4, 5–7, 7–5
Loss	3.	22 June 1998	ITF Velp, Netherlands	Clay	(Netherlands) Jolanda Mens	(Netherlands) Claudia Reimering (Netherlands) Andrea van den Hurk	4–6, 4–6
Win	5.	24 June 2002	ITF Alkmaar, Netherlands	Clay	(Austria) Nicole Melch	(Netherlands) Jolanda Mens (Australia) Sarah Stone	7–6^{(2)}, 6–2
Win	6.	5 November 2002	ITF Manila, Philippines	Hard	(Philippines) Dianne Matias	(China) Dong Yan-Hua (China) Zhang Yao	4–6, 6–4, 6–4
Loss	4.	20 January 2003	ITF Grenoble, France	Hard (i)	(Belgium) Leslie Butkiewicz	(France) Séverine Brémond Beltrame (France) Amandine Dulon	7–5, 6–7^{(2)}, 6–7^{(4)}
Loss	5.	18 February 2003	ITF Buchen, Germany	Carpet (i)	(Belgium) Leslie Butkiewicz	(Romania) Magda Mihalache (Germany) Syna Schmidle	2–6, 3–6
Win	7.	27 January 2003	ITF Belfort, France	Hard (i)	(France) Sophie Lefèvre	(China) Liu Nannan (China) Xie Yanze	6–3, 6–3
Win	8.	23 June 2003	ITF Alkmaar, Netherlands	Clay	(Belgium) Leslie Butkiewicz	(Netherlands) Marielle Hoogland (Netherlands) Jolanda Mens	6–1, 6–4
Loss	6.	21 July 2003	ITF Horb, Germany	Clay	(Belgium) Leslie Butkiewicz	(Russia) Maria Kondratieva (New Zealand) Shelley Stephens	3–6, 6–3, 3–6
Loss	7.	4 August 2003	ITF Rebecq, Belgium	Clay	(Belgium) Leslie Butkiewicz	(France) Anne-Laure Heitz (France) Amandine Singla	6–0, 6–7^{(3)}, 5–7
Win	9.	24 August 2003	ITF Middelkerke, Belgium	Clay	(Belgium) Leslie Butkiewicz	(Turkey) İpek Şenoğlu (Belgium) Eveline Vanhyfte	6–4, 6–2
Loss	8.	21 September 2003	ITF Sunderland, United Kingdom	Hard (i)	(Australia) Nicole Kriz	(Republic of Ireland) Claire Curran (Sweden) Helena Ejeson	2–6, 1–6
Win	10.	28 September 2003	GB Pro-Series Glasgow, UK	Hard (i)	(Australia) Nicole Kriz	(New Zealand) Leanne Baker (Italy) Francesca Lubiani	7–5, 6–2
Loss	9.	26 January 2004	ITF Belfort, France	Hard (i)	(France) Sophie Lefèvre	(Czech Republic) Olga Blahotová (Czech Republic) Gabriela Navrátilová	3–6, 2–6
Win	11.	9 February 2004	ITF Sunderland, UK	Hard (i)	(Republic of Ireland) Claire Curran	(United Kingdom) Helen Crook (Germany) Martina Müller	6–4, 3–6, 6–3
Win	12.	16 February 2004	ITF Redbridge, UK	Hard (i)	(Republic of Ireland) Claire Curran	(Czech Republic) Olga Blahotová (Czech Republic) Gabriela Navrátilová	6–3, 3–6, 7–6^{(10)}
Loss	10.	19 July 2005	ITF Pétange, Luxembourg	Clay	(United Kingdom) Claire Curran	(Ukraine) Yuliya Beygelzimer (Germany) Sandra Klösel	4–6, 0–6
Loss	11.	8 August 2005	ITF Rebecq, Belgium	Clay	(Serbia and Montenegro) Neda Kozić	(Belgium) Leslie Butkiewicz (Belgium) Jessie de Vries	w/o
Win	13.	12 February 2006	ITF Sunderland, UK	Hard (i)	(Netherlands) Elise Tamaëla	(South Africa) Surina De Beer (Japan) Ayami Takase	7–5, 6–4
Win	14.	10 February 2007	ITF Tipton, UK	Hard (i)	(Netherlands) Elise Tamaëla	(Russia) Ksenia Lykina (Poland) Urszula Radwańska	6–3, 6–3
Win	15.	20 July 2007	ITF Zwevegem, Belgium	Clay	(Netherlands) Elise Tamaëla	(Poland) Magdalena Kiszczyńska (Poland) Karolina Kosińska	3–6, 6–4, 6–3
Loss	12.	28 October 2007	ITF İstanbul, Turkey	Hard (i)	(Netherlands) Elise Tamaëla	(Bosnia and Herzegovina) Mervana Jugić-Salkić (Turkey) İpek Şenoğlu	1–6, 2–6
Win	16.	13 July 2008	ITF Brussels, Belgium	Clay	(Netherlands) Daniëlle Harmsen	(Belarus) Volha Duko (Belgium) Ineke Mergaert	6–4, 5–3 ret.
Win	17.	18 July 2008	ITF Zwevegem, Belgium	Clay	(Netherlands) Daniëlle Harmsen	(Czech Republic) Iveta Gerlová (Slovenia) Tadeja Majerič	6–4, 6–2
Loss	13.	27 July 2008	ITF Horb, Germany	Clay	(Netherlands) Daniëlle Harmsen	(Czech Republic) Simona Dobrá (Czech Republic) Lucie Kriegsmannová	6–2, 3–6, [8–10]
Win	18.	8 November 2008	ITF Sunderland, UK	Hard (i)	(Netherlands) Daniëlle Harmsen	(United Kingdom) Katharina Brown (United Kingdom) Tara Moore	6–7^{(4)}, 6–4, [10–4]
Win	19.	16 November 2008	ITF Jersey, UK	Hard (i)	(Netherlands) Daniëlle Harmsen	(United Kingdom) Tara Moore (United Kingdom) Elizabeth Thomas	7–6^{(4)}, 6–4
Win	20.	15 March 2009	ITF Dijon, France	Hard (i)	(Netherlands) Daniëlle Harmsen	(United Kingdom) Amanda Elliott (France) Violette Huck	7–6^{(2)}, 6–1
Win	21.	4 April 2009	ITF Pelham, United States	Clay	(Netherlands) Daniëlle Harmsen	(Canada) Marie-Ève Pelletier (Portugal) Frederica Piedade	6–4, 5–7, [11–9]
Loss	14.	28 August 2009	ITF Enschede, Netherlands	Clay	(Netherlands) Daniëlle Harmsen	(Netherlands) Quirine Lemoine (Netherlands) Sabine van der Sar	2–6, 6–4, [8–10]
Loss	15.	6 September 2009	ITF Almere, Netherlands	Clay	(Netherlands) Daniëlle Harmsen	(Netherlands) Kiki Bertens (Netherlands) Nicole Thyssen	6–4, 2–6, [4–10]
Win	22.	20 September 2009	ITF Porto, Portugal	Clay	(Netherlands) Marcella Koek	(Italy) Apollonia Melzani (Romania) Andreea Văideanu	6–3, 6–0
Loss	16.	22 October 2009	ITF Sevilla, Spain	Clay	(Netherlands) Marcella Koek	(Spain) Sara del Barrio Aragón (Netherlands) Nicolette van Uitert	3–6, 4–6
Win	23.	28 October 2010	ITF Monastir, Tunisia	Hard	(Netherlands) Nicolette van Uitert	(Italy) Indra Bigi (Italy) Nicole Clerico	6–3, 6–2
Loss	17.	21 November 2010	ITF Équeurdreville, France	Hard (i)	(Netherlands) Nicolette van Uitert	(France) Florence Haring (Madagascar) Nantenaina Ramalalaharivololona	6–1, 3–6, [6–10]
Loss	18.	19 February 2011	ITF Leimen, Germany	Hard (i)	(Netherlands) Nicolette van Uitert	(Czech Republic) Martina Borecká (Czech Republic) Petra Krejsová	6–2, 6–7^{(5)}, [4–10]
Win	24.	26 February 2011	ITF Zell am Harmersbach, Germany	Carpet (i)	(Netherlands) Nicolette van Uitert	(Belarus) Lidziya Marozava (Belarus) Sviatlana Pirazhenka	7–5, 6–4
Loss	19.	25 June 2011	ITF Breda, Netherlands	Clay	(Netherlands) Nicolette van Uitert	(Netherlands) Eva Wacanno (Australia) Karolina Wlodarczak	2–6, 4–6
Loss	20.	15 July 2011	ITF Zwevegem, Belgium	Clay	(Netherlands) Nicolette van Uitert	(Slovakia) Lenka Wienerová (Ukraine) Maryna Zanevska	4–6, 6–3, [7–10]
Loss	21.	29 July 2011	ITF Maaseik, Belgium	Clay	(Netherlands) Nicolette van Uitert	(Netherlands) Marcella Koek (Netherlands) Eva Wacanno	5–7, 1–6
Win	25.	5 August 2011	ITF Rebecq, Belgium	Hard	(Netherlands) Nicolette van Uitert	(Belgium) Marie Benoît (Belgium) Kimberley Zimmermann	6–2, 6–2
Win	26.	12 August 2011	ITF Koksijde, Belgium	Clay	(Netherlands) Nicolette van Uitert	(Belgium) Elyne Boeykens (Belgium) Nicky Van Dyck	5–7, 6–3, [10–8]
Win	27.	2 September 2011	ITF Apeldoorn, Netherlands	Clay	(Netherlands) Nicolette van Uitert	(China) Lu Jiaxiang (China) Lu Jiajing	6–4, 6–0
Loss	22.	25 February 2012	ITF Mâcon, France	Hard (i)	(Netherlands) Nicolette van Uitert	(Italy) Giulia Gatto-Monticone (Slovakia) Michaela Hončová	4–6, 6–1, [5–10]
Loss	23.	13 July 2012	ITF Zwevegem, Belgium	Clay	(Netherlands) Nicolette van Uitert	(Romania) Mihaela Buzărnescu (Germany) Nicola Geuer	6–7^{(5)}, 6–1, [4–10]
Win	28.	28 July 2012	ITF Maaseik, Belgium	Clay	(Netherlands) Nicolette van Uitert	(United States) Brynn Boren (United States) Shelby Talcott	6–4, 6–0
Loss	24.	24 August 2012	ITF Enschede, Netherlands	Clay	(Netherlands) Nicolette van Uitert	(Georgia (country)) Ekaterine Gorgodze (Georgia (country)) Sofia Kvatsabaia	4–6, 6–1, [6–10]
Win	29.	6 October 2012	ITF Sharm El Sheikh, Egypt	Hard	(Netherlands) Nicolette van Uitert	(China) Lu Jiaxiang (China) Lu Jiajing	4–6, 6–4, [10–3]
Loss	25.	3 August 2013	ITF Sharm El Sheikh, Egypt	Hard	(Netherlands) Nicolette van Uitert	(New Zealand) Dianne Hollands (Ukraine) Anastasia Kharchenko	6–3, 4–6, [8–10]
Win	30.	10 August 2013	ITF Sharm El Sheikh, Egypt	Hard	(Netherlands) Nicolette van Uitert	(China) Gai Ao (Russia) Ekaterina Lavrikova	6–1, 6–0
