= 2004 Gaz de France Stars =

- Date: 27 September – 3 October
- Edition: 1st
- Category: Tier III
- Draw: 30S / 16D
- Prize money: $170,000
- Surface: Hard / indoor
- Location: Hasselt, Belgium

Champions

Singles
- (Russia) Elena Dementieva

Doubles
- (United States) Jennifer Russell / (Italy) Mara Santangelo
Gaz de France Stars	· 2005 →

The 2004 Gaz de France Stars was a women's tennis tournament played on indoor hard courts. It was the inaugural edition of the Gaz de France Stars, and was part of the Tier III category of the 2004 WTA Tour. It took place in Hasselt, Belgium, from 27 September until 3 October 2004. First-seeded Elena Dementieva won the singles title.

== Finals ==
=== Singles ===
(Russia) Elena Dementieva defeated (Russia) Elena Bovina, 0–6, 6–0, 6–4

- It was Dementieva's only singles title of the year and the 4th of her career.

=== Doubles ===
(United States) Jennifer Russell / (Italy) Mara Santangelo defeated (Spain) Nuria Llagostera Vives / (Spain) Marta Marrero, 6–3, 7–5

- It was Russell's only doubles title of her career. It was Santangelo's only doubles title of the year and the 1st of her career.

== Singles entrants ==
=== Seeds ===
Country	Player	Rank^{1}	Seed
RUS	Elena Dementieva	6	1
BEL	Kim Clijsters	7	2
RUS	Elena Bovina	17	3
CRO	Karolina Šprem	18	4
ITA	Francesca Schiavone	19	5
ITA	Silvia Farina Elia	20	6
BUL	Magdalena Maleeva	22	7
FRA	~~Nathalie Dechy~~	24	8
CRO	Jelena Kostanić	35	9

- Rankings as of September 20, 2004

=== Other entrants ===
The following players received wildcards into the singles main draw:

- (Belgium) Els Callens
- (Belgium) Caroline Maes
- (Bulgaria) Magdalena Maleeva

The following players received entry from the qualifying draw:

- (Germany) Angelika Bachmann
- (Czech Republic) Eva Birnerová
- (Germany) Vanessa Henke
- (United States) Lindsay Lee-Waters

The following players received entry as a lucky loser:

- (Czech Republic) Michaela Paštiková
- (France) Capucine Rousseau

=== Withdrawals ===
- (Germany) Anca Barna
- (France) Nathalie Dechy (left thigh sprain)
- (France) Émilie Loit (pelvis injury)
