= Claire de Gubernatis =

French tennis player

- Country (sports): France
- Born: 18 July 1986 (age 38)
- Plays: Left-handed (two-handed backhand)
- Prize money: $87,275

Singles
- Career record: 196–150
- Career titles: 5 ITF
- Highest ranking: No. 196 (13 September 2010)

Grand Slam singles results
- French Open: Q1 (2010, 2011)
- US Open: Q2 (2010)

Doubles
- Career record: 80–81
- Career titles: 7 ITF
- Highest ranking: 233 (9 April 2007)

Claire de Gubernatis (born 18 July 1986) is a French former professional tennis player.

As of 13 September 2010, she reached her highest singles rankings of 196. Her best doubles ranking was 233, which she achieved on 9 April 2007.

At the Morocco Open in Fes, she made her first appearance in the main draw of a WTA Tour tournament, reaching the second round as a qualifier where she fell to the eventual winner, Iveta Benešová.

== ITF Circuit finals ==
$100,000 tournaments
$75,000 tournaments
$50,000 tournaments
$25,000 tournaments
$10,000 tournaments

=== Singles 11 (5–6) ===
| Outcome | No. | Date | Tournament | Surface | Opponent | Score |
|---|---|---|---|---|---|---|
| Winner | 1. | 26 June 2005 | ITF Orestiada, Greece | Hard | (Germany) Christine Sperling | 6–4, 6–7^{(4)}, 6–1 |
| Runner-up | 2. | 16 July 2005 | ITF Brussels, Belgium | Clay | (Belgium) Leslie Butkiewicz | 7–5, 1–6, 4–6 |
| Runner-up | 3. | 28 August 2005 | ITF Westende, Belgium | Hard | (France) Diana Brunel | 4–6, 6–3, 1–6 |
| Runner-up | 4. | 8 May 2006 | ITF Antalya, Turkey | Clay | (Georgia (country)) Margalita Chakhnashvili | 1–6, 5–7 |
| Winner | 5. | 27 August 2006 | ITF Westende, Belgium | Hard | (Italy) Verdiana Verardi | 6–3, 6–3 |
| Runner-up | 6. | 13 August 2007 | ITF Koksijde, Belgium | Clay | (Slovakia) Lenka Wienerová | 1–6, 4–6 |
| Runner-up | 7. | 14 October 2007 | ITF Espinho, Portugal | Clay | (Portugal) Ana Catarina Nogueira | 5–7, 6–3, 1–6 |
| Winner | 8. | 6 December 2009 | ITF Poza Rica, Mexico | Hard | (Netherlands) Chayenne Ewijk | 6–3, 6–2 |
| Winner | 9. | 15 March 2010 | ITF Amiens, France | Clay | (Italy) Giulia Gatto-Monticone | 6–3, 6–3 |
| Runner-up | 10. | 20 June 2010 | ITF Montpellier, France | Clay | (France) Mathilde Johansson | 7–5, 4–6, 2–6 |
| Winner | 11. | 17 April 2011 | ITF Osprey, United States | Clay | (France) Caroline Garcia | 6–4, 6–4 |

=== Doubles: 11 (7–4) ===
| Outcome | No. | Date | Tournament | Surface | Partner | Opponents | Score |
|---|---|---|---|---|---|---|---|
| Winner | 1. | 8 May 2005 | ITF Tortosa, Spain | Clay | (Spain) Adriana González Peñas | (Spain) Anna Font Estrada (Spain) Lourdes Pascual-Rodriguez | w/o |
| Winner | 2. | 26 June 2005 | Orestiada, Greece | Hard | (Germany) Christine Sperling | (Czech Republic) Klara Jagosova (Ukraine) Kateryna Polunina | 7–5, 6–2 |
| Runner-up | 3. | 28 August 2005 | Westende, Belgium | Hard | (Spain) Anna Font Estrada | (Belgium) Leslie Butkiewicz (Belgium) Eveline Vanhyfte | 4–6, 2–6 |
| Runner-up | 4. | 8 May 2006 | Antalya, Turkey | Clay | (Romania) Alexandra Dulgheru | (Georgia (country)) Margalita Chakhnashvili (Turkey) İpek Şenoğlu | 4–6, 3–6 |
| Runner-up | 5. | 13 August 2006 | Rebecq, Belgium | Clay | (Italy) Verdiana Verardi | (Netherlands) Daniëlle Harmsen (Belgium) Jessie de Vries | 4–6, 2–6 |
| Winner | 6. | 27 August 2006 | Westende, Belgium | Hard | (France) Celine Cattaneo | (Belgium) Leslie Butkiewicz (France) Émilie Bacquet | 7–6^{(4)}, 6–3 |
| Winner | 7. | 21 January 2007 | Stuttgart, Germany | Hard (i) | (Italy) Valentina Sulpizio | (Czech Republic) Iveta Gerlová (Czech Republic) Lucie Kriegsmannová | 6–1, 6–4 |
| Winner | 8. | 30 January 2007 | Hull, Great Britain | Hard | (Portugal) Neuza Silva | (United Kingdom) Danielle Brown (United Kingdom) Elizabeth Thomas | 6–7^{(2)}, 7–5, 6–4 |
| Winner | 9. | 24 August 2007 | Westende, Belgium | Hard | (France) Samantha Schoeffel | (Belgium) Leslie Butkiewicz (United Kingdom) Katharina Brown | 4–6, 6–2, 6–2 |
| Winner | 10. | 17 September 2007 | ITF Lecce, Italy | Clay | (Germany) Tatjana Priachin | (Hungary) Kira Nagy (Italy) Valentina Sassi | 6–3, 6–2 |
| Runner-up | 11. | 1 October 2007 | ITF Porto, Portugal | Clay | (Russia) Anna Savitskaya | (Switzerland) Conny Perrin (Switzerland) Nicole Riner | 7–5, 3–6, [3–10] |
