= 2005 Gaz de France Stars =

- Date: 24–30 October
- Edition: 2nd
- Category: Tier III
- Draw: 32S / 16D
- Prize money: $170,000
- Surface: Hard / indoor
- Location: Hasselt, Belgium

Champions

Singles
- (Belgium) Kim Clijsters

Doubles
- (France) Émilie Loit / (Slovenia) Katarina Srebotnik
← 2004 ·	Gaz de France Stars	· 2006 →

The 2005 Gaz de France Stars was a women's tennis tournament played on indoor hard courts. It was the second edition of the Gaz de France Stars, and was part of the Tier III category of the 2005 WTA Tour. It took place in Hasselt, Belgium, from 24 October until 30 October 2005. First-seeded Kim Clijsters won the singles title.

== Finals ==
=== Singles ===
(Belgium) Kim Clijsters defeated (Italy) Francesca Schiavone, 6–2, 6–3

- It was Clijsters' 9th and last singles title of the year and the 30th of her career.

=== Doubles ===
(France) Émilie Loit / (Slovenia) Katarina Srebotnik defeated (Netherlands) Michaëlla Krajicek / (Hungary) Ágnes Szávay, 6–3, 6–4

- It was Loit's 6th and last doubles title of the year and the 14th of her career. It was Srebotnik's 4th and last doubles title of the year and the 11th of her career.

== Singles entrants ==
=== Seeds ===
Country	Player	Rank^{1}	Seed
BEL	Kim Clijsters	2	1
FRA	Nathalie Dechy	14	2
ITA	Francesca Schiavone	18	3
RUS	Dinara Safina	20	4
ESP	Anabel Medina Garrigues	30	5
ITA	Silvia Farina Elia	31	6
RUS	Anna Chakvetadze	35	7
SLO	Katarina Srebotnik	43	8

- Rankings as of October 17, 2005

=== Other entrants ===
The following players received wildcards into the singles main draw:

- (Belgium) Els Callens
- (Belgium) Kirsten Flipkens

The following players received entry from the qualifying draw:

- (Estonia) Kaia Kanepi
- (Luxembourg) Mandy Minella
- (Ukraine) Olga Savchuk
- (United States) Meilen Tu

=== Withdrawals ===
Before the tournament

- (Colombia) Catalina Castaño
- (Argentina) Mariana Díaz Oliva
- (Russia) Maria Kirilenko
- (Australia) Alicia Molik (vestibular neuronitis)
- (Venezuela) María Vento-Kabchi
