= Liana Ungur =

Romanian tennis player

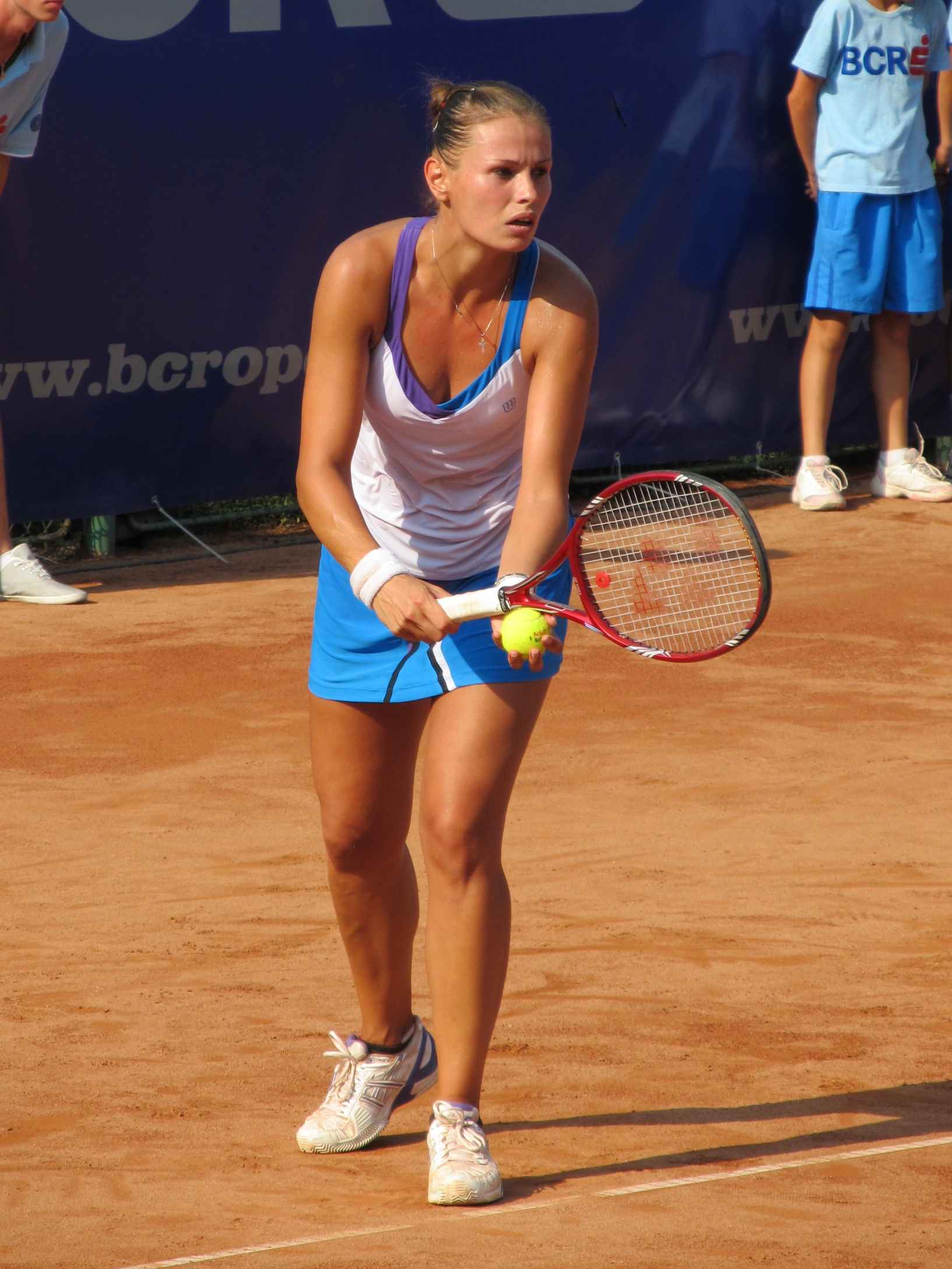
- Ungur at the 2011 Open Romania Ladies
- Full name: Liana-Gabriela Ungur
- Country (sports): Romania
- Residence: Florence, Italy
- Born: 2 January 1985 (age 40); Socialist Republic of Romania
- Turned pro: 2000
- Plays: Right-handed (two-handed backhand)
- Prize money: $161,627

Singles
- Career record: 346–204
- Career titles: 13 ITF
- Highest ranking: No. 157 (13 December 2010)

Grand Slam singles results
- Australian Open: Q1 (2011)
- French Open: Q3 (2011)
- Wimbledon: Q1 (2011)
- US Open: Q1 (2008, 2010, 2011)

Doubles
- Career record: 115–84
- Career titles: 6 ITF
- Highest ranking: No. 262 (8 August 2011)

Team competitions
- Fed Cup: 2–3

Liana-Gabriela Ungur (née Balaci; born 2 January 1985) is a former professional tennis player from Romania. On 13 December 2010, she reached her highest singles ranking of 157 by the Women's Tennis Association (WTA).

== Personal life ==
Liana, daughter of Romanian football legend Ilie Balaci, is married to Adrian Ungur who is also a professional tennis player.

== ITF Circuit finals ==
=== Singles: 26 (13–13) ===
$100,000 tournaments
$75,000 tournaments
$50,000 tournaments
$40,000 tournaments
$25,000 tournaments
$10,000 tournaments

Result	No.	Date	Tournament	Surface	Opponent	Score
Loss	1.	20 May 2001	ITF Szczecin, Poland	Clay	(Czech Republic) Lenka Snajdrová	7–5, 2–6, 5–7
Loss	2.	19 August 2001	ITF Bucharest, Romania	Clay	(Germany) Antonela Voina	3–6, 5–7
Win	1.	9 September 2001	ITF Mollerussa, Spain	Clay	(Spain) María Pilar Sánchez Alayeto	7–5, 6–0
Loss	3.	26 May 2002	Olecko, Poland	Clay	(Poland) Marta Domachowska	6–1, 3–6, 1–6
Loss	4.	9 June 2002	Poznań, Poland	Clay	(Netherlands) Jolanda Mens	0–6, 5–7
Win	2.	9 March 2003	Nuevo Laredo, Mexico	Hard	(Germany) Caroline-Ann Basu	7–6^{(4)}, 6–2
Win	3.	27 July 2003	Ancona, Italy	Clay	(Luxembourg) Mandy Minella	3–6, 6–3, 6–1
Loss	5.	1 February 2004	Tipton, England	Hard	(Finland) Emma Laine	7–6^{(4)}, 2–6, 3–6
Win	4.	8 February 2004	Vale do Lobo, Portugal	Hard	(France) Servane Delobelle	6–2, 6–4
Loss	6.	13 June 2004	Piteşti, Romania	Clay	(Romania) Mihaela Buzărnescu	3–6, 6–7^{(4)}
Win	5.	8 August 2004	Rebecq, Belgium	Clay	(Germany) Antonela Voina	6–4, 6–1
Win	6.	5 September 2004	Arad, Romania	Clay	(Hungary) Barbara Pócza	7–5, 7–5
Loss	7.	24 October 2004	Settimo San Pietro, Italy	Clay	(France) Aravane Rezaï	3–6, 4–6
Loss	8.	15 May 2005	Bucharest, Romania	Clay	(Romania) Alexandra Dulgheru	2–6, 2–6
Win	7.	19 November 2006	Cairo, Egypt	Clay	(Romania) Alexandra Dulgheru	6–1, 6–1
Win	8.	26 November 2006	Cairo, Egypt	Clay	(Russia) Varvara Galanina	6–2, 6–4
Win	9.	11 February 2007	Vale do Lobo, Portugal	Hard	(Israel) Evgenia Linetskaya	7–6^{(4)}, 6–2
Loss	9.	8 July 2007	Båstad, Sweden	Clay	(Sweden) Sofia Arvidsson	7–6^{(7)}, 2–6, 0–6
Loss	10.	12 August 2007	Gdynia, Poland	Clay	(Czech Republic) Renata Voráčová	4–6, 4–6
Loss	11.	23 March 2008	Pomezia, Italy	Clay	(Poland) Anna Korzeniak	3–6, 3–6
Win	10.	9 May 2010	Florence, Italy	Clay	(Belarus) Polina Pekhova	6–3, 7–5
Win	11.	6 June 2010	Sarajevo, Bosnia Herzegovina	Clay	(France) Irena Pavlovic	6–3, 6–0
Win	12.	20 June 2010	ITF Padua, Italy	Clay	(France) Audrey Bergot	6–4, 6–4
Win	13.	7 August 2010	ITF Monteroni d'Arbia, Italy	Clay	(Italy) Anna Floris	7–5, 6–1
Loss	12.	28 January 2012	ITF Antalya, Turkey	Clay	(Romania) Cristina Dinu	5–7, 3–6
Loss	13.	19 February 2012	ITF Antalya, Turkey	Clay	(Ukraine) Yuliya Beygelzimer	5–7, 5–7

=== Doubles: 18 (6–12) ===
Result	No.	Date	Tournament	Surface	Partner	Opponents	Score
Win	1.	6 August 2000	ITF Bucharest, Romania	Clay	(Romania) Edina Gallovits	(Slovakia) Zuzana Kučová (Czech Republic) Dominika Luzarová	7–5, 4–0 ret.
Loss	1.	27 January 2002	ITF Båstad, Sweden	Hard (i)	(Greece) Christina Zachariadou	(Hungary) Eszter Molnár (Sweden) Aleksandra Srndovic	6–2, 2–6, 5–7
Loss	2.	17 February 2002	ITF Vilamoura, Portugal	Hard	(Spain) Marta Fraga	(Japan) Maki Arai (Japan) Remi Tezuka	2–6, 5–7
Loss	3.	26 May 2002	Olecko, Poland	Clay	(Czech Republic) Eva Erbová	(Slovakia) Martina Babáková (Slovakia) Lenka Tvarošková	2–6, 6–3, 2–6
Win	2.	2 February 2003	Tipton, England	Hard (i)	(Belgium) Elke Clijsters	(Czech Republic) Zuzana Černá (Czech Republic) Iveta Gerlová	6–3, 6–2
Loss	4.	11 May 2003	Tortosa, Spain	Clay	(Spain) María Pilar Sánchez Alayeto	(Portugal) Frederica Piedade (Turkey) İpek Şenoğlu	4–6, 6–7^{(3)}
Loss	5.	18 May 2003	Monzón, Spain	Clay	(France) Kildine Chevalier	(Ukraine) Olena Antypina (Russia) Raissa Gourevitch	6–3, 5–7, 1–6
Win	3.	14 September 2003	Madrid, Spain	Hard	(Turkey) İpek Şenoğlu	(Australia) Lisa D'Amelio (Belgium) Jennifer De Bodt	6–3, 6–3
Loss	6.	18 July 2004	Bucharest, Romania	Clay	(United States) Iris Ichim	(Romania) Mădălina Gojnea (Romania) Monica Niculescu	4–6, 1–6
Win	4.	8 August 2004	Rebecq, Belgium	Clay	(Germany) Antonela Voina	(Belgium) Jessie de Vries (Belgium) Debbrich Feys	6–2, 5–7, 6–4
Loss	7.	27 August 2005	Bucharest, Romania	Clay	(Romania) Simona Matei	(Romania) Corina Corduneanu (Romania) Ágnes Szatmári	w/o
Loss	8.	12 February 2006	Vale do Lobo, Portugal	Hard	(Turkey) İpek Şenoğlu	(France) Émilie Bacquet (Netherlands) Chayenne Ewijk	3–6, 3–6
Win	5.	27 June 2008	Padua, Italy	Clay	(Romania) Anda Perianu	(Argentina) Mailen Auroux (Germany) Carmen Klaschka	6–3, 6–3
Loss	9.	16 January 2010	Glasgow, Scotland	Hard (i)	(Italy) Nicole Clerico	(France) Victoria Larrière (United Kingdom) Anna Smith	4–6, 4–6
Win	6.	26 March 2010	Pomezia, Italy	Clay	(Italy) Stefania Chieppa	(Italy) Andreea Văideanu (Italy) Erika Zanchetta	7–6^{(3)}, 4–6, [10–7]
Loss	10.	22 April 2011	Civitavecchia, Italy	Clay	(Romania) Diana Enache	(Netherlands) Daniëlle Harmsen (Hungary) Réka Luca Jani	2–6, 3–6
Loss	11.	4 June 2011	ITF Rome, Italy	Clay	(Poland) Magda Linette	(Australia) Sophie Ferguson (Australia) Sally Peers	w/o
Loss	12.	20 January 2012	ITF Antalya, Turkey	Clay	(Romania) Diana Marcu	(Romania) Cristina Dinu (Romania) Andreea Mitu	6–7, 2–6
