= Olga Brózda =

Polish tennis player (born 1986)

- Country (sports): Poland
- Residence: Poznań, Poland
- Born: 26 January 1986 (age 40) Poznań
- Turned pro: 2001
- Plays: Right (two-handed backhand)
- Prize money: $109,075

Singles
- Career record: 248–187
- Career titles: 6 ITF
- Highest ranking: No. 281 (7 April 2008)

Doubles
- Career record: 326–137
- Career titles: 48 ITF
- Highest ranking: No. 135 (3 August 2009)

Olga Brózda (Polish pronunciation: [ˈolɡa ˈbruzda]; born 26 January 1986) is a Polish former tennis player.

As a professional, her career-high WTA rankings are 281 in singles, achieved in April 2008, and 135 in doubles, set in August 2009. She reached twelve finals on the ITF Women's Circuit in singles, six of which she won. In doubles, she won 48 ITF titles. Her regular doubles partners were Magdalena Kiszczyńska or Natalia Kołat.

== ITF Circuit finals ==
$100,000 tournaments
$75,000 tournaments
$50,000 tournaments
$25,000 tournaments
$15,000 tournaments
$10,000 tournaments

=== Singles: 12 (6 titles, 6 runner-ups) ===
Result	No.	Date	Tournament	Surface	Opponent	Score
Loss	1.	30 May 2004	ITF Olecko, Poland	Clay	(Belarus) Ekaterina Dzehalevich	6–4, 5–7, 4–6
Loss	2.	5 September 2004	ITF Warsaw, Poland	Clay	(Poland) Natalia Kołat	4–6, 6–4, 3–6
Loss	3.	4 June 2006	ITF Olecko, Poland	Clay	(Latvia) Irina Kuzmina	4–6, 4–6
Win	4.	13 April 2007	ITF Split, Croatia	Clay	(Austria) Patricia Mayr	7–6^{(3)}, 6–0
Loss	5.	24 June 2007	ITF Alkmaar, Netherlands	Clay	(Slovakia) Lenka Wienerová	3–6, 6–4, 4–6
Win	6.	26 August 2007	ITF Westende, Belgium	Hard	(Italy) Evelyn Mayr	3–6, 6–3, 6–0
Loss	7.	9 September 2007	ITF Kędzierzyn-Koźle, Poland	Clay	(Czech Republic) Kateřina Vaňková	6–3, 4–6, 6–7^{(7)}
Win	8.	7 October 2007	ITF Mytilini, Greece	Hard	(Israel) Keren Shlomo	6–2, 6–4
Win	9.	14 October 2007	ITF Volos, Greece	Carpet	(Bulgaria) Biljana Pavlova	6–7^{(2)}, 6–2, 6–0
Win	10.	16 March 2008	ITF Dijon, France	Hard (i)	(United Kingdom) Sarah Borwell	7–5, 4–6, 6–4
Win	11.	25 October 2009	ITF Thessaloniki, Greece	Clay	(Bulgaria) Tanya Germanlieva	5–7, 6–1, 6–2
Loss	12.	14 May 2011	ITF Båstad, Sweden	Clay	(Slovakia) Romana Tabak	5–7, 7–6^{(2)}, 2–6

=== Doubles: 77 (48 titles, 29 runner-ups) ===
Result	No.	Date	Tournament	Surface	Partner	Opponents	Score
Win	1.	3 May 2004	ITF Warsaw, Poland	Clay	(Poland) Monika Schneider	(Ukraine) Natalia Bogdanova (Ukraine) Valeria Bondarenko	2–6, 6–4, 6–2
Loss	2.	4 October 2004	ITF Dubrovnik, Croatia	Clay	(Poland) Sylwia Niedbalo	(Croatia) Darija Jurak (Croatia) Lucia Krzelj	6–4, 2–6, 4–6
Loss	3.	8 February 2005	ITF Mallorca, Spain	Clay	(Austria) Tina Schiechtl	(Spain) Adriana Gonzalez-Peñas (Switzerland) Romina Oprandi	3–6, 5–7
Win	4.	15 February 2005	ITF Mallorca, Spain	Clay	(Czech Republic) Petra Cetkovská	(Spain) Adriana Gonzalez-Peñas (Switzerland) Romina Oprandi	6–3, 6–4
Win	5.	24 May 2005	ITF Olecko, Poland	Clay	(Poland) Natalia Kołat	(Latvia) Irina Kuzmina (Latvia) Alise Vaidere	5–7, 6–1, 6–1
Win	6.	7 June 2005	Warsaw, Poland	Clay	(Poland) Natalia Kołat	(Ukraine) Veronika Kapshay (Russia) Elena Chalova	6–1, 6–4
Win	7.	19 July 2005	Düsseldorf, Germany	Clay	(Poland) Monika Schneider	(Montenegro) Danica Krstajić (Russia) Elena Chalova	1–6, 6–1, 6–2
Loss	8.	30 August 2005	Gliwice, Poland	Clay	(Poland) Natalia Kołat	(Czech Republic) Lucie Kriegsmannová (Czech Republic) Zuzana Zálabská	5–7, 6–4, 2–6
Loss	9.	27 September 2005	Morelia, Mexico	Hard	(United States) Jessica Williams	(Mexico) Daniela Múñoz Gallegos (Mexico) Valeria Pulido	2–6, 0–6
Loss	10.	22 November 2005	San Luis Potosí, Mexico	Hard	(Brazil) Jenifer Widjaja	(Italy) Francesca Lubiani (Italy) Valentina Sassi	3–6, 6–4, 5–7
Win	11.	14 March 2006	Cairo, Egypt	Clay	(Italy) Silvia Disderi	(Ukraine) Kateryna Herth (France) Iryna Brémond	6–3, 6–1
Win	12.	3 April 2006	Athens, Greece	Clay	(Estonia) Margit Rüütel	(Romania) Gabriela Niculescu (Romania) Monica Niculescu	2–6, 6–4, 6–2
Loss	13.	8 May 2006	Monzón, Spain	Hard	(Israel) Yevgenia Savransky	(Australia) Monique Adamczak (Germany) Annette Kolb	5–7, 3–6
Win	14.	22 May 2006	La Palma, Spain	Hard	(Poland) Karolina Kosińska	(Croatia) Matea Mezak (Croatia) Nadja Pavić	4–6, 6–3, 6–4
Win	15.	30 May 2006	Olecko, Poland	Clay	(Poland) Natalia Kołat	(Latvia) Irina Kuzmina (Latvia) Alise Vaidere	6–2, 6–3
Loss	16.	18 July 2006	Zwevegem, Belgium	Clay	(Poland) Natalia Kołat	(Belgium) Leslie Butkiewicz (Belgium) Caroline Maes	2–6, 2–6
Win	17.	8 August 2006	Gdynia, Poland	Clay	(Poland) Natalia Kołat	(Belarus) Aleksandra Malyarchikova (Ukraine) Oksana Teplyakova	6–2, 6–1
Loss	18.	7 November 2006	Opole, Poland	Carpet	(Poland) Natalia Kołat	(Czech Republic) Nikola Fraňková (Czech Republic) Andrea Hlaváčková	5–7, 0–6
Win	19.	28 November 2006	Cairo, Egypt	Clay	(France) Émilie Bacquet	(Russia) Vasilisa Davydova (Russia) Varvara Galanina	6–1, 6–3
Loss	20.	14 December 2006	Valašské Meziříčí, Czech Republic	Hard	(Poland) Natalia Kołat	(Czech Republic) Nikola Fraňková (Czech Republic) Andrea Hlaváčková	1–6, 2–6
Win	21.	26 March 2007	Patras, Greece	Hard	(Slovakia) Lenka Tvarošková	(Bosnia and Herzegovina) Mervana Jugić-Salkić (Greece) Anna Koumantou	6–3, 3–1 ret.
Win	22.	10 April 2007	Split, Croatia	Clay	(Poland) Natalia Kołat	(Romania) Mihaela Buzărnescu (Romania) Antonia Xenia Tout	6–2, 6–1
Loss	23.	15 May 2007	Michalovce, Slovakia	Clay	(Poland) Justyna Jegiołka	(Slovakia) Klaudia Boczová (Slovakia) Kristína Kučová	5–7, 6–4, 3–6
Win	24.	19 June 2007	Alkmaar, Netherlands	Clay	(Poland) Natalia Kołat	(Netherlands) Daniëlle Harmsen (Netherlands) Claire Lablans	6–3, 3–6, 6–3
Loss	25.	13 August 2007	Koksijde, Belgium	Clay	(Poland) Sylwia Zagórska	(France) Émilie Bacquet (France) Samantha Schoeffel	1–6, 1–6
Loss	26.	4 September 2007	Kędzierzyn-Koźle, Poland	Clay	(Poland) Sylwia Zagórska	(Slovakia) Michaela Pochabová (Slovakia) Patrícia Verešová	2–6, 4–6
Loss	27.	25 September 2007	Thessaloniki, Greece	Clay	(Poland) Sylwia Zagórska	(Italy) Nicole Clerico (Greece) Anna Koumantou	6–4, 4–6, [9–11]
Win	28.	2 October 2007	Mytilini, Greece	Hard	(Poland) Magdalena Kiszczyńska	(Italy) Nicole Clerico (Greece) Anna Koumantou	6–2, 7–6^{(3)}
Win	29.	9 October 2007	Volos, Greece	Carpet	(Poland) Magdalena Kiszczyńska	(Poland) Justyna Jegiołka (Ukraine) Anastasiya Vasylyeva	6–3, 7–6^{(5)}
Win	30.	6 November 2007	ITF Jounieh Open, Israel	Clay	(Russia) Maria Kondratieva	(Italy) Nicole Clerico (Brazil) Teliana Pereira	6–3, 6–1
Win	31.	21 November 2007	Opole, Poland	Carpet	(Ukraine) Veronika Kapshay	(Czech Republic) Lucie Kriegsmannová (Czech Republic) Darina Sedenková	7–5, 6–3
Win	32.	18 March 2008	Amiens, France	Clay	(Belarus) Volha Duko	(Portugal) Magali de Lattre (Sweden) Madeleine Saari-Bystrom	6–2, 6–3
Loss	33.	25 March 2008	Tessenderlo, Belgium	Clay	(Russia) Maria Kondratieva	(Netherlands) Daniëlle Harmsen (Netherlands) Marlot Meddens	4–6, 4–6
Win	34.	27 May 2008	Olecko, Poland	Clay	(Poland) Magdalena Kiszczyńska	(Sweden) Annie Goransson (Denmark) Hanne Skak Jensen	6–4, 6–2
Win	35.	1 July 2008	Bella Cup Toruń, Poland	Clay	(Poland) Magdalena Kiszczyńska	(Romania) Mihaela Buzărnescu (Russia) Anastasia Pivovarova	4–6, 6–4, [10–2]
Loss	36.	5 August 2008	Coimbra, Portugal	Clay	(Slovakia) Martina Babáková	(Spain) Paula Fondevila Castro (Spain) Lucía Sainz	6–7^{(2)}, 0–6
Win	37.	12 August 2008	Palić Open, Serbia	Clay	(Poland) Magdalena Kiszczyńska	(Bosnia and Herzegovina) Mervana Jugić-Salkić (Serbia) Teodora Mirčić	6–3, 7–6^{(5)}
Win	38.	2 September 2008	Brno, Czech Republic	Clay	(Poland) Magdalena Kiszczyńska	(Czech Republic) Hana Birnerová (Czech Republic) Darina Sedenková	6–2, 6–2
Win	39.	21 October 2008	Sant Cugat, Spain	Clay	(Romania) Diana Enache	(Spain) Melisa Cabrera-Handt (Spain) Lucía Sainz	6–7^{(4)}, 7–6^{(3)}, [10–7]
Loss	40.	3 November 2008	Kraków, Poland	Hard	(Poland) Sandra Zaniewska	(Germany) Angelique Kerber (Poland) Urszula Radwańska	3–6, 2–6
Win	41.	16 March 2009	Amiens, France	Clay	(Poland) Magdalena Kiszczyńska	(Romania) Bianca Hincu (France) Anaïs Laurendon	6–2, 6–1
Win	42.	23 March 2009	Gonesse, France	Clay	(Poland) Magdalena Kiszczyńska	(Italy) Martina Caciotti (Italy) Nicole Clerico	6–1, 6–2
Win	43.	13 October 2009	Mytilini, Greece	Hard	(Poland) Justyna Jegiołka	(United Kingdom) Jocelyn Rae (United Kingdom) Jade Windley	6–4, 6–4
Loss	44.	20 October 2009	Thessaloniki, Greece	Clay	(Poland) Justyna Jegiołka	(Romania) Diana Enache (Romania) Camelia-Elena Hristea	7–5, 4–6, [9–11]
Win	45.	27 October 2009	Volos, Greece	Carpet	(Poland) Justyna Jegiołka	(Bulgaria) Tanya Germanlieva (Bulgaria) Dessislava Mladenova	4–6, 6–4, [10–7]
Win	46.	1 March 2010	Lyon, France	Hard	(Poland) Magdalena Kiszczyńska	(Romania) Elena Bogdan (France) Stéphanie Vongsouthi	5–7, 6–4, [10–6]
Loss	47.	8 March 2010	Dijon, France	Hard	(Poland) Magdalena Kiszczyńska	(France) Estelle Guisard (France) Anaïs Laurendon	5–7, 5–7
Loss	48.	13 April 2010	Tessenderlo, Belgium	Clay	(Poland) Barbara Sobaszkiewicz	(Poland) Magdalena Kiszczyńska (Finland) Emma Laine	4–6, 1–6
Loss	49.	26 April 2010	Vic, Spain	Clay	(Poland) Barbara Sobaszkiewicz	(Romania) Mihaela Buzărnescu (Romania) Cristina-Madalina Stancu	5–7, 6–3, [7–10]
Win	50.	3 May 2010	Badalona, Spain	Clay	(Poland) Barbara Sobaszkiewicz	(Spain) Sheila Solsona-Carcasona (Mexico) Alina Sullivan	6–1, 6–4
Win	51.	15 June 2010	Lenzerheide, Switzerland	Clay	(Poland) Sylwia Zagórska	(Italy) Martina Caciotti (Italy) Nicole Clerico	4–6, 6–1, [10–5]
Win	52.	17 August 2010	Wahlstedt, Germany	Clay	(Poland) Natalia Kołat	(Netherlands) Marcella Koek (Netherlands) Bernice van de Velde	3–6, 6–3, [10–8]
Win	53.	24 August 2010	Enschede, Netherlands	Clay	(Poland) Natalia Kołat	(Germany) Carolin Daniels (Germany) Julia Wachaczyk	6–1, 6–3
Loss	54.	31 August 2010	Gliwice, Poland	Clay	(Poland) Veronika Domagała	(Poland) Justyna Jegiołka (Poland) Katarzyna Kawa	2–6, 6–7^{(4)}
Win	55.	7 September 2010	Katowice, Poland	Clay	(Poland) Natalia Kołat	(Poland) Katarzyna Piter (Poland) Barbara Sobaszkiewicz	6–3, 6–3
Loss	56.	26 October 2010	Dubrovnik, Croatia	Clay	(Poland) Natalia Kołat	(Romania) Diana Enache (Italy) Andreea Văideanu	3–6, 2–6
Loss	57.	24 November 2010	Zubr Cup Přerov, Czech Republic	Hard	(Poland) Natalia Kołat	(Czech Republic) Iveta Gerlová (Czech Republic) Lucie Kriegsmannová	1–6, 3–6
Win	58.	13 May 2011	Båstad, Sweden	Clay	(Poland) Natalia Kołat	(Colombia) Yuliana Lizarazo (Germany) Alina Wessel	7–6^{(3)}, 6–2
Win	59.	20 May 2011	Båstad, Sweden	Clay	(Poland) Natalia Kołat	(Sweden) Hilda Melander (Sweden) Paulina Milosavljevic	6–3, 6–1
Win	60.	18 June 2011	Alkmaar, Netherlands	Clay	(Poland) Natalia Kołat	(Malta) Kimberley Cassar (Bulgaria) Isabella Shinikova	6–7^{(6)}, 6–2, [10–2]
Win	61.	30 July 2011	Palić Open, Serbia	Clay	(Poland) Natalia Kołat	(Romania) Karina Goia (Bulgaria) Dalia Zafirova	6–2, 6–3
Loss	62.	8 June 2012	ITF Amarante, Portugal	Hard	(Poland) Natalia Kołat	(Mexico) Ivette López (Spain) Nuria Párrizas Díaz	w/o
Win	63.	28 July 2012	Tampere Open, Finland	Clay	(Netherlands) Anouk Tigu	(Czech Republic) Nikola Horáková (Russia) Julia Valetova	6–4, 6–3
Loss	64.	3 August 2012	ITF Savitaipale, Finland	Clay	(Czech Republic) Nikola Horáková	(Denmark) Karen Barbat (Sweden) Eveliina Virtanen	w/o
Win	65.	30 August 2012	ITF Gaziantep, Turkey	Hard	(Czech Republic) Nikola Horáková	(Ukraine) Khristina Kazimova (Kazakhstan) Zalina Khairudinova	6–4, 6–2
Win	66.	8 September 2012	ITF Antalya, Turkey	Hard	(Czech Republic) Nikola Horáková	(Belarus) Darya Shulzhanok (Slovakia) Nikola Vajdová	6–0, 6–4
Loss	67.	21 September 2012	ITF Sharm El Sheikh, Egypt	Hard	(Ukraine) Ganna Piven	(Switzerland) Belinda Bencic (France) Lou Brouleau	6–7^{(3)}, 6–3, [6–10]
Win	68.	28 September 2012	ITF Sharm El Sheikh, Egypt	Hard	(China) Lu Jiaxiang	(Oman) Fatma Al-Nabhani (Belarus) Lidziya Marozava	7–5, 6–2
Win	69.	18 October 2012	ITF Akko, Israel	Hard	(Poland) Natalia Kołat	(Czech Republic) Nikola Fraňková (Russia) Ekaterina Yashina	6–2, 6–4
Win	70.	25 October 2012	ITF Ashkelon, Israel	Hard	(Poland) Natalia Kołat	(Czech Republic) Nikola Fraňková (Russia) Ekaterina Yashina	7–6^{(11)}, 6–1
Win	71.	20 April 2013	ITF Sharm El Sheikh, Egypt	Hard	(Poland) Natalia Kołat	(Russia) Olga Doroshina (Brazil) Laura Pigossi	6–3, 6–1
Win	72.	14 August 2015	ITF Las Palmas, Spain	Clay	(Ukraine) Anastasiya Shoshyna	(Netherlands) Chayenne Ewijk (Netherlands) Rosalie van der Hoek	7–6^{(8)}, 3–6, [10–7]
Win	73.	7 November 2015	ITF Stockholm, Sweden	Hard (i)	(Ukraine) Anastasiya Shoshyna	(Italy) Deborah Chiesa (Estonia) Valeria Gorlats	6–3, 6–2
Loss	74.	30 April 2016	Chiasso Open, Switzerland	Clay	(Poland) Katarzyna Kawa	(Germany) Antonia Lottner (Germany) Anne Schäfer	1–6, 1–6
Win	75.	3 June 2016	ITF Szczawno-Zdrój, Poland	Clay	(Ukraine) Anastasiya Shoshyna	(Ukraine) Maryna Kolb (Ukraine) Nadiya Kolb	6–2, 7–6^{(4)}
Loss	76.	18 May 2019	ITF Tacarigua, Trinidad & Tobago	Hard (i)	(Poland) Paulina Jastrzebska	(Venezuela) Nadia Echeverria Alam (United States) Sabastiani Leon	5–7, 4–6
Loss	77.	25 May 2019	ITF Tacarigua, Trinidad & Tobago	Hard (i)	(Poland) Paulina Jastrzebska	(Venezuela) Nadia Echeverria Alam (United States) Sabastiani Leon	4–6, 3–6
