= Sophie Erre =

French tennis player

- Country (sports): France
- Born: 6 April 1979 (age 47) Calais, France
- Height: 171 cm (5 ft 7 in)
- Plays: Right-handed
- Prize money: $66,932

Singles
- Career record: 145–111
- Career titles: 5 ITF
- Highest ranking: No. 165 (12 June 2000)

Grand Slam singles results
- French Open: 1R (2000)

Doubles
- Career titles: 0
- Highest ranking: No. 368 (29 September 2003)

Sophie Erre (born 6 April 1979) is a former professional tennis player from France.

== Biography ==
A right-handed player from Calais, Erre had a best ranking in singles of 165 in the world.

Erre qualified for her first WTA Tour main draw at the 2000 Internationaux de Strasbourg, after which she was received a wildcard into the French Open, where she was beaten in the first round by Tamarine Tanasugarn in two tiebreaks.

== ITF finals ==
$25,000 tournaments
$10,000 tournaments

=== Singles: 8 (5–3) ===
Result	No.	Date	Tournament	Surface	Opponent	Score
Win	1.	13 October 1997	Saint Raphael, France	Hard (i)	(Netherlands) Yvette Basting	6–1, 6–4
Win	2.	13 September 1998	Denain, France	Clay	(France) Sandrine Bouilleau	6–2, 6–3
Win	3.	22 August 1999	Koksijde, Belgium	Clay	(Germany) Gabriela Kučerová	5–7, 7–6, 6–2
Loss	4.	21 February 2000	Bushey, United Kingdom	Carpet (i)	(Belarus) Nadejda Ostrovskaya	6–3, 3–6, 6–7^{(5)}
Loss	5.	19 March 2001	Cholet, France	Clay	(Germany) Vanessa Henke	7–6^{(1)}, 3–6, 3–6
Win	6.	26 March 2001	Amiens, France	Clay	(Croatia) Jelena Pandžić	6–7^{(3)}, 6–3, 7–6^{(6)}
Loss	7.	17 September 2001	Glasgow, United Kingdom	Hard (i)	(Czech Republic) Eva Birnerová	6–3, 5–7, 4–6
Win	8.	19 November 2001	Deauville, France	Clay (i)	(France) Virginie Pichet	6–4, 6–3

=== Doubles: 1 (0–1) ===
Result	No.	Date	Tournament	Surface	Partner	Opponents	Score
Loss	1.	15 June 2003	Canet-en-Roussillon, France	Clay	(France) Aurélie Védy	(Belgium) Leslie Butkiewicz (Belgium) Eveline Vanhyfte	6–4, 3–6, 4–6
