= Zuzana Černá =

Czech tennis player

- Country (sports): Czech Republic
- Born: 10 February 1983 (age 42); Prague, Czechoslovakia
- Height: 1.68 m (5 ft 6 in)
- Plays: Right-handed
- Prize money: $17,757

Singles
- Career record: 52–50
- Career titles: 1 ITF
- Highest ranking: No. 495 (3 May 2004)

Doubles
- Career record: 89–37
- Career titles: 11 ITF
- Highest ranking: No. 279 (23 June 2003)

Zuzana Černá (born 10 February 1983) is a Czech former professional tennis player.

Born in Prague, Černá won a total of twelve titles while competing on the ITF Women's Circuit, eleven of which came in doubles.

In 2004, she left the tour and continued her career as a collegiate player for Baylor University in the United States.

== ITF finals ==
Legend
$25,000 tournaments
$10,000 tournaments

=== Singles (1–0) ===
Result	Date	Tournament	Surface	Opponent	Score
Win	27 July 2003	ITF Puerto Ordaz, Venezuela	Hard	(Argentina) Betina Jozami	6–0, 6–0

=== Doubles: 19 (11–8) ===
Result	No.	Date	Tournament	Surface	Partner	Opponents	Score
Loss	1.	24 June 2002	ITF Périgueux, France	Clay	(Ukraine) Irena Nossenko	(Uruguay) Ana Lucía Migliarini de León (Italy) Giorgia Mortello	6–7^{(3)}, 2–6
Loss	2.	14 July 2002	Bella Cup, Poland	Clay	(Czech Republic) Iveta Gerlová	(Poland) Anna Bieleń-Żarska (Slovakia) Lenka Tvarošková	5–7, 6–4, 4–6
Win	1.	4 August 2002	ITF Pétange, Luxembourg	Clay	(Czech Republic) Iveta Gerlová	(Slovakia) Dominika Diešková (Slovakia) Lenka Tvarošková	1–6, 6–1, 6–3
Loss	3.	18 August 2002	ITF Koksijde, Belgium	Clay	(Czech Republic) Vladimíra Uhlířová	(Ukraine) Valeria Bondarenko (Lithuania) Edita Liachovičiūtė	4–6, 2–6
Win	2.	18 November 2002	ITF Deauville, France	Clay	(Czech Republic) Zuzana Hejdová	(Bulgaria) Maria Geznenge (Bulgaria) Antoaneta Pandjerova	6–4, 7–5
Loss	4.	2 February 2003	ITF Tipton, United Kingdom	Hard	(Czech Republic) Iveta Gerlová	(Belgium) Elke Clijsters (Romania) Liana Ungur	3–6, 2–6
Loss	5.	24 March 2003	ITF Athens, Greece	Clay	(Germany) Caroline Korsawe	(Romania) Magda Mihalache (Romania) Ruxandra Marin	2–6, 3–6
Win	3.	7 April 2003	ITF Antalya, Turkey	Clay	(Czech Republic) Vladimíra Uhlířová	(Austria) Daniela Klemenschits (Austria) Sandra Klemenschits	6–3, 6–2
Win	4.	14 July 2003	ITF Puerto Ordaz, Venezuela	Hard	(Germany) Caroline Korsawe	(Mexico) Daniela Múñoz Gallegos (Argentina) Micaela Moran	6–3, 1–6, 6–2
Loss	6.	11 August 2003	ITF Koksijde, Belgium	Clay	(Czech Republic) Vladimíra Uhlířová	(Belgium) Elke Clijsters (Belgium) Kirsten Flipkens	2–6, 4–6
Win	5.	19 October 2003	ITF Valencia, Venezuela	Hard	(Czech Republic) Eva Hrdinová	(Argentina) Soledad Esperón (Argentina) Flavia Mignola	6–3, 4–6, 6–1
Win	6.	26 October 2003	ITF Caracas, Venezuela	Hard	(Czech Republic) Eva Hrdinová	(Argentina) María José Argeri (Brazil) Letícia Sobral	w/o
Win	7.	15 February 2004	ITF Albufeira, Portugal	Clay	(Czech Republic) Vladimíra Uhlířová	(France) Kildine Chevalier (Portugal) Frederica Piedade	6–7^{(4)}, 6–4, 7–5
Win	8.	28 February 2004	ITF Benin City 1, Nigeria	Hard	(Germany) Franziska Etzel	(South Africa) Chanelle Scheepers (Austria) Jennifer Schmidt	6–0, 5–7, 6–3
Loss	7.	7 March 2004	ITF Benin City 2, Nigeria	Hard	(Germany) Franziska Etzel	(South Africa) Chanelle Scheepers (Jamaica) Alanna Broderick	2–6, 2–6
Win	9.	19 April 2004	ITF Hvar, Croatia	Clay	(Czech Republic) Tereza Veverková	(Austria) Daniela Kix (Bosnia and Herzegovina) Sandra Martinović	4–6, 6–4, 7–6
Loss	8.	11 July 2004	ITF Le Touquet, France	Clay	(Russia) Ekaterina Kirianova	(Canada) Aneta Soukup (Czech Republic) Janette Bejlková	6–2, 4–6, 2–6
Win	10.	18 July 2004	ITF Brussels, Belgium	Hard	(Czech Republic) Eva Hrdinová	(Belgium) Leslie Butkiewicz (Belgium) Eveline Vanhyfte	7–6^{(3)}, 7–6^{(5)}
Win	11.	25 July 2004	ITF Zwevegem, Belgium	Clay	(Canada) Aneta Soukup	(Belgium) Leslie Butkiewicz (New Zealand) Shelley Stephens	6–3, 6–2
