= Martina Babáková =

Slovak tennis player

- Country (sports): Slovakia
- Born: 18 April 1983 (age 42) Žilina, Czechoslovakia
- Plays: Right (two-handed backhand)
- Prize money: $50,483

Singles
- Career record: 120–191
- Career titles: 0
- Highest ranking: No. 402 (8 September 2003)

Doubles
- Career record: 179–145
- Career titles: 18 ITF
- Highest ranking: No. 269 (11 February 2008)
Medal record
Tennis
Representing Slovakia
Summer Universiade
Bronze medal – third place	2009 Belgrade	Doubles
Bronze medal – third place	2009 Belgrade	Team

Martina Babáková (born 18 April 1983) is a Slovak former professional tennis player.

== Biography ==
A right-handed player born in Žilina, Babáková was a top-50 junior who was most prominent on the professional tour as a doubles player.

Babáková won 18 ITF doubles titles and made her only WTA Tour main-draw appearance at the 2008 Budapest Grand Prix, with Anna Lapushchenkova in the doubles.

At the 2009 Summer Universiade in Belgrade, she partnered Katarína Kachlíková to win a women's doubles bronze medal for Slovakia. She also won a bronze medal for the team event.

== ITF Circuit finals ==
Legend
$25,000 tournaments
$10,000 tournaments

=== Singles (0–2) ===
Result	No.	Date	Tournament	Surface	Opponent	Score
Loss	1.	12 March 2007	ITF Ramat Hasharon, Israel	Hard	(Israel) Evgenia Linetskaya	3–6, 6–7
Loss	2.	26 August 2007	ITF London, United Kingdom	Hard	(Netherlands) Pauline Wong	4–6, 1–6

=== Doubles (18–19) ===
Result	No.	Date	Tournament	Surface	Partner	Opponents	Score
Win	1.	8 October 2000	ITF Fiumicino, Italy	Clay	(Germany) Scarlett Werner	(Greece) Asimina Kaplani (Greece) Maria Pavlidou	4–1, 4–1, 4–2
Win	2.	20 May 2001	ITF Szczecin, Poland	Clay	(Czech Republic) Iveta Benešová	(Russia) Anastassia Belova (Belarus) Darya Kustova	6–4, 7–6^{(4)}
Win	3.	27 May 2001	ITF Olecko, Poland	Clay	(Czech Republic) Lenka Snajdrová	(Ukraine) Kateryna Bondarenko (Ukraine) Valeria Bondarenko	6–2, 6–2
Win	4.	3 June 2001	Warsaw, Poland	Clay	(Czech Republic) Lenka Snajdrová	(Ukraine) Yuliya Beygelzimer (Armenia) Liudmila Nikoyan	6–4, 6–4
Win	5.	26 May 2002	Olecko, Poland	Clay	(Slovakia) Lenka Tvarošková	(Czech Republic) Eva Erbová (Romania) Liana Ungur	6–2, 3–6, 6–2
Loss	6.	16 June 2002	Kędzierzyn-Koźle, Poland	Clay	(Slovakia) Lenka Tvarošková	(Ukraine) Valeria Bondarenko (Ukraine) Mariya Koryttseva	3–6, 0–6
Loss	7.	9 July 2002	Sezze, Italy	Clay	(Ukraine) Yevgenia Savranska	(France) Kildine Chevalier (France) Aurélie Védy	3–6, 5–7
Loss	8.	1 September 2002	Bielefeld, Germany	Clay	(Slovakia) Lenka Tvarošková	(Germany) Lisa Fritz (Germany) Lydia Steinbach	5–7, 4–6
Loss	9.	8 September 2002	Chieti, Italy	Clay	(Czech Republic) Veronika Ctvrtnicková	(Italy) Katia Altilia (Italy) Valentina Sulpizio	2–6, 6–2, 3–6
Win	10.	15 September 2002	Prešov, Slovakia	Clay	(Slovakia) Maria Jedličková	(Czech Republic) Ivana Plateniková (Slovakia) Eva Šestáková	7–6, 3–6, 6–4
Win	11.	20 October 2002	Makarska, Croatia	Clay	(Czech Republic) Lenka Novotná	(Netherlands) Kika Hogendoorn (Germany) Christiane Hoppmann	6–4, 6–1
Loss	12.	16 March 2003	Amiens, France	Clay (i)	(Slovakia) Lenka Tvarošková	(France) Karla Mraz (France) Aurélie Védy	4–5 ret.
Loss	13.	16 November 2003	Le Havre, France	Clay (i)	(Poland) Monika Schneider	(Belgium) Leslie Butkiewicz (Belgium) Eveline Vanhyfte	2–6, 2–2 ret.
Win	14.	11 April 2004	Makarska, Croatia	Clay	(Czech Republic) Iveta Gerlová	(Bulgaria) Maria Penkova (Italy) Lisa Tognetti	6–1, 6–4
Loss	15.	16 May 2004	Casale Monferrato, Italy	Clay	(Italy) Stefania Chieppa	(Russia) Irina Smirnova (Italy) Valentina Sulpizio	3–6, 6–3, 3–6
Loss	16.	23 May 2004	Zadar, Croatia	Clay	(Slovakia) Michaela Michálková	(Luxembourg) Mandy Minella (Italy) Lisa Tognetti	w/o
Loss	17.	31 August 2004	Warsaw, Poland	Clay	(Czech Republic) Iveta Gerlová	(Poland) Alicja Rosolska (Poland) Klaudia Jans-Ignacik	2–6, 3–6
Loss	18.	2 October 2004	Benevento, Italy	Hard	(Czech Republic) Sandra Záhlavová	(Italy) Giulia Gabba (Italy) Karin Knapp	2–6, 1–0 ret.
Win	19.	2 April 2006	GB Pro-Series Bath, United Kingdom	Hard (i)	(Poland) Urszula Radwańska	(France) Marie-Perrine Baudouin (France) Karla Mraz	6–3, 6–1
Loss	20.	6 August 2006	Saulgau, Germany	Clay	(Slovakia) Linda Smolenaková	(Croatia) Josipa Bek (Germany) Lydia Steinbach	4–6, 3–6
Win	21.	28 August 2006	Vienna, Austria	Clay	(Bosnia and Herzegovina) Sandra Martinović	(Austria) Franziska Klotz (Austria) Marlena Metzinger	6–2, 6–0
Loss	22.	11 February 2007	Algarve, Portugal	Hard	(Romania) Raluca Ciulei	(Spain) Melissa Cabrera-Handt (Spain) Carolina Gago Fuentes	7–6, 0–6, 6–7
Loss	23.	11 March 2007	Ramat Hasharon, Israel	Hard	(Turkey) İpek Şenoğlu	(Czech Republic) Iveta Gerlová (Czech Republic) Lucie Kriegsmannová	3–6, 3–6
Loss	24.	19 March 2007	Raanana, Israel	Hard	(Argentina) Veronica Spiegel	(Israel) Evgenia Linetskaya (Israel) Tzipora Obziler	1–6, 2–6
Win	25.	7 April 2007	GB Pro-Series Bath, UK	Hard (i)	(Czech Republic) Kateřina Vaňková	(United Kingdom) Rebecca Fong (United States) Susanna Lingman	6–4, 6–4
Win	26.	15 April 2007	Torhout, Belgium	Hard	(Netherlands) Kika Hogendoorn	(Italy) Elena Pioppo (Italy) Verdiana Verardi	7–6, 6–3
Win	27.	23 August 2007	Cumberland, United Kingdom	Hard	(United Kingdom) Anna Smith	(United Kingdom) Anna Hawkins (United Kingdom) Karen Paterson	6–2, 6–3
Win	28.	2 September 2007	Palić Open, Serbia	Clay	(Belgium) Davinia Lobbinger	(Turkey) Hülya Esen (Turkey) Lütfiye Esen	6–2, 6–3
Loss	29.	16 January 2008	Sunderland, UK	Hard (i)	(Czech Republic) Iveta Gerlová	(Sweden) Johanna Larsson (United Kingdom) Anna Smith	1–6, 6–3, [3–10]
Win	30.	21 January 2008	Wrexham, UK	Clay	(Czech Republic) Iveta Gerlová	(New Zealand) Dianne Hollands (Russia) Elena Kulikova	3–6, 6–3, [11–9]
Loss	31.	11 February 2008	Albufeira, Portugal	Hard	(Russia) Elena Chalova	(Israel) Julia Glushko (Russia) Marina Melnikova	3–6, 6–0, [9–11]
Win	32.	16 March 2008	Dijon, France	Hard	(Czech Republic) Iveta Gerlová	(United Kingdom) Natasha Khan (United Kingdom) Danielle Brown	5–7, 7–5, [10–4]
Win	33.	22 March 2008	GB Pro-Series Bath, UK	Hard	(Czech Republic) Iveta Gerlová	(United Kingdom) Sarah Borwell (United Kingdom) Olivia Scarfi	6–1, 5–7, [10–1]
Loss	34.	5 August 2008	Coimbra, Portugal	Clay	(Poland) Olga Brózda	(Spain) Paula Fondevila Castro (Spain) Lucía Sainz	6–7^{(2)}, 0–6
Loss	35.	13 August 2008	ITF London, UK	Hard	(Georgia (country)) Manana Shapakidze	(United States) Megan Moulton-Levy (United Kingdom) Emily Webley-Smith	1–6, 1–6
Win	36.	25 January 2009	ITF Wrexham, UK	Hard	(Czech Republic) Iveta Gerlová	(United Kingdom) Danielle Brown (United Kingdom) Elizabeth Thomas	2–6, 6–3, [11–9]
Loss	37.	31 May 2009	ITF Braga, Portugal	Clay	(Belgium) Davinia Lobbinger	(Mexico) Ximena Hermoso (Mexico) Daniela Múñoz Gallegos	3–6, 4–6
