= Maria Kondratieva =

Russian tennis player

- Native name: Мария Александровна Кондратьева
- Country (sports): Russia
- Born: 17 January 1982 (age 44) Moscow, Russian SFSR, Soviet Union
- Turned pro: 1999
- Retired: 2016
- Plays: Right-handed (two-handed backhand)
- Prize money: $333,832

Singles
- Career record: 259–211
- Career titles: 4 ITF
- Highest ranking: No. 210 (23 June 2008)

Grand Slam singles results
- US Open: Q1 (2005, 2008)

Doubles
- Career record: 260–270
- Career titles: 1 WTA, 20 ITF
- Highest ranking: No. 48 (18 October 2010)

Grand Slam doubles results
- Australian Open: 2R (2011)
- French Open: 2R (2010)
- Wimbledon: 1R (2010, 2011)
- US Open: 1R (2010, 2011)

Grand Slam mixed doubles results
- Wimbledon: 1R (2011)

Maria Alexandrovna Kondratieva (Russian: Мария Александровна Кондратьева; born 17 January 1982) is a Russian former professional tennis player.

Kondratieva started playing tennis aged seven and turned professional in 1999. She has a career-high singles ranking of world No. 210, achieved on 23 June 2008. On 18 October 2010, she peaked at No. 48 in the WTA doubles rankings. Kondratieva won one doubles title on the WTA Tour, as well as four singles and 20 doubles titles on the ITF Women's Circuit.

She and her partner Vladimíra Uhlířová beat Marina Erakovic and Anna Chakvetadze in the final of the 2010 Banka Koper Slovenia Open. This was Kondratieva's only time to win a WTA Tour doubles title in her career. In 2016, Kondratieva announced her retirement from tennis.

== WTA Tour finals ==
=== Doubles: 4 (1 title, 3 runner-ups) ===
Winner – Legend
Grand Slam tournaments
WTA Championships
Premier M & Premier 5
Premier (0–1)
International (1–2)

Result	No.	Date	Tournament	Surface	Partner	Opponents	Score
Loss	1.	Oct 2009	Kremlin Cup, Russia	Hard (i)	(Czech Republic) Klára Zakopalová	(Russia) Maria Kirilenko (Russia) Nadia Petrova	6–2, 6–2
Loss	2.	Apr 2010	Andalucia Tennis Experience, Spain	Clay	(Kazakhstan) Yaroslava Shvedova	(Italy) Sara Errani (Italy) Roberta Vinci	6–4, 6–2
Win	3.	Jul 2010	Koper Open, Slovenia	Hard	(Czech Republic) Vladimíra Uhlířová	(New Zealand) Marina Erakovic (Russia) Anna Chakvetadze	6–4, 2–6, [10–7]
Loss	4.	Jul 2010	İstanbul Cup, Turkey	Hard	(Czech Republic) Vladimíra Uhlířová	(Greece) Eleni Daniilidou (Germany) Jasmin Wöhr	6–4, 1–6, [11–9]

== ITF finals ==
=== Singles (4–7) ===
Legend $50,000 tournaments $25,000 tournaments $10,000 tournaments	Finals by surface Hard (0–2) Clay (4–5)

Result	No.	Date	Location	Surface	Opponent	Score
Loss	1.	24 June 2001	Velp, Netherlands	Clay	(Russia) Ilona Vichnevskaya	7–6^{(5)}, 3–6, 2–6
Win	1.	22 July 2001	Le Touquet, France	Clay	(France) Aurore Desert	6–4, 7–6^{(6)}
Loss	2.	23 September 2001	Tbilisi, Georgia	Clay	(Austria) Patricia Wartusch	0–6, 6–4, 2–6
Win	2.	18 November 2001	Le Havre, France	Clay	(Russia) Oksana Karyshkova	7–5, 5–7, 7–5
Win	3.	27 July 2003	Horb, Germany	Clay	(Serbia) Ana Timotić	7–5, 6–3
Loss	3.	4 July 2004	Mont-de-Marsan, France	Clay	(Spain) Paula García	3–6, 2–6
Loss	4.	18 July 2004	Garching, Germany	Clay	(Croatia) Sanda Mamić	3–6, 6–1, 2–6
Loss	5.	29 August 2004	Moscow, Russia	Clay	(Russia) Ekaterina Bychkova	2–6, 1–6
Win	4.	12 September 2004	Tbilisi, Georgia	Clay	(Georgia (country)) Margalita Chakhnashvili	7–5, 6–4
Loss	6.	9 October 2005	Troy, United States	Hard	(United States) Ahsha Rolle	1–6, 5–7
Loss	7.	26 April 2008	Namangan, Uzbekistan	Hard	(Kyrgyzstan) Ksenia Palkina	0–6, 6–3, 3–6

=== Doubles (20–12) ===
Legend $100,000 tournaments $75,000 tournaments $50,000 tournaments $25,000 tournaments $10,000 tournaments	Finals by surface Hard (2–4) Clay (16–7) Carpet (2–1)

Result	No.	Date	Location	Surface	Partner	Opponents	Score
Loss	1.	19 January 2001	Istanbul, Turkey	Hard	(Russia) Svetlana Mossiakova	(Turkey) Duygu Akşit Oal (Belarus) Elena Yaryshka	3–6, 0–6
Win	1.	30 July 2001	Istanbul, Turkey	Hard	(Russia) Svetlana Mossiakova	(Greece) Maria Pavlidou (Greece) Evagelia Roussi	6–2, 7–5
Win	2.	27 August 2001	Alphen aan den Rijn, Netherlands	Clay	(Russia) Ilona Vichnevskaya	(Netherlands) Anouk Sterk (Netherlands) Susanne Trik	3–6, 6–2, 6–1
Win	3.	11 November 2001	Le Havre, France	Clay	(Latvia) Līga Dekmeijere	(Uruguay) Daniela Olivera (Madagascar) Natacha Randriantefy	6–4, 6–3
Win	4.	19 November 2001	Deauville, France	Clay	(Latvia) Līga Dekmeijere	(Republic of Ireland) Yvonne Doyle (Czech Republic) Eva Erbova	6–1, 7–6^{(7)}
Win	5.	21 January 2002	Courmayeur, Italy	Carpet	(Russia) Goulnara Fattakhetdinova	(Ukraine) Yuliya Beygelzimer (Netherlands) Jolanda Mens	5–7, 6–3, 6–4
Win	6.	18 March 2002	Juárez, Mexico	Clay	(Australia) Anastasia Rodionova	(Czech Republic) Olga Vymetálková (Czech Republic) Magdalena Zděnovcová	6–3, 6–0
Win	7.	30 June 2002	Rabat, Morocco	Clay	(Russia) Goulnara Fattakhetdinova	(Netherlands) Debby Haak (Netherlands) Jolanda Mens	6–3, 7–5
Win	8.	21 July 2002	Les Contamines, France	Hard	(Serbia and Montenegro) Katarina Mišić	(France) Stéphanie Cohen-Aloro (France) Anne-Laure Heitz	6–1, 7–6^{(4)}
Win	9.	12 August 2002	Innsbruck, Austria	Clay	(Russia) Goulnara Fattakhetdinova	(Germany) Magdalena Kučerová (Germany) Lydia Steinbach	6–4, 4–6, 6–3
Loss	2.	15 September 2002	Tbilisi, Georgia	Clay	(Russia) Goulnara Fattakhetdinova	(Czech Republic) Eva Birnerová (Czech Republic) Gabriela Chmelinová	4–6, 0–6
Loss	3.	23 September 2002	Batumi Ladies Open, Georgia	Hard	(Russia) Goulnara Fattakhetdinova	(Bulgaria) Antoaneta Pandjerova (Bulgaria) Dessislava Topalova	6–2, 1–6, 1–6
Win	10.	21 July 2003	Horb, Germany	Clay	(New Zealand) Shelley Stephens	(Belgium) Leslie Butkiewicz (Netherlands) Kim Kilsdonk	6–3, 3–6, 6–3
Loss	4.	1 September 2003	Zhukovsky, Russia	Clay	(Russia) Goulnara Fattakhetdinova	(Ukraine) Alona Bondarenko (Ukraine) Valeria Bondarenko	7–6^{(6)}, 4–6, 3–6
Loss	5.	13 September 2004	Tbilisi, Georgia	Clay	(Russia) Ekaterina Kozhokina	(Belarus) Darya Kustova (Russia) Elena Vesnina	2–6, 4–6
Win	11.	6 June 2005	Grado Tennis Cup, Italy	Clay	(Belarus) Tatsiana Uvarova	(Australia) Daniella Jeflea (Belarus) Darya Kustova	6–1, 3–6, 7–5
Win	12.	11 April 2006	Jackson, United States	Clay	(France) Sophie Lefèvre	(Japan) Seiko Okamoto (Japan) Ayami Takase	6–0, 6–3
Win	13.	21 August 2006	Moscow, Russia	Clay	(Russia) Ekaterina Makarova	(Romania) Mihaela Buzărnescu (Russia) Evgeniya Rodina	4–6, 6–4, 6–1
Loss	6.	25 June 2007	Istanbul, Turkey	Hard	(Slovakia) Stanislava Hrozenská	(Australia) Monique Adamczak (United States) Tetiana Luzhanska	4–6, 4–6
Win	14.	21 August 2007	Moscow, Russia	Clay	(Serbia) Vesna Dolonc	(France) Sophie Lefèvre (Russia) Nina Bratchikova	6–2, 6–1
Loss	7.	1 September 2007	Moscow, Russia	Clay	(Russia) Vasilisa Davydova	(Russia) Alisa Kleybanova (Russia) Anastasia Pivovarova	4–6, 6–3, 2–6
Win	15.	5 November 2007	Jounieh, Lebanon	Clay	(Poland) Olga Brózda	(Italy) Nicole Clerico (Brazil) Teliana Pereira	6–3, 6–1
Loss	8.	24 March 2008	Tessenderlo, Belgium	Clay	(Poland) Olga Brózda	(Netherlands) Daniëlle Harmsen (Netherlands) Marlot Meddens	4–6, 4–6
Loss	9.	19 May 2008	Moscow, Russia	Clay	(Ukraine) Oksana Uzhylovska	(Finland) Emma Laine (Serbia) Teodora Mirčić	6–7^{(7)}, 2–6
Win	16.	28 July 2008	Dnipropetrovsk, Ukraine	Clay	(Russia) Vasilisa Davydova	(Ukraine) Lyudmyla Kichenok (Ukraine) Nadiia Kichenok	6–3, 6–1
Win	17.	8 August 2008	Moscow, Russia	Clay	(Russia) Vitalia Diatchenko	(Ukraine) Veronika Kapshay (Latvia) Irina Kuzmina	6–0, 6–4
Loss	10.	26 January 2009	Grenoble, France	Carpet (i)	(France) Sophie Lefèvre	(France) Youlia Fedossova (France) Virginie Pichet	3–6, 3–6
Win	18.	23 May 2009	Moscow, Russia	Clay	(Russia) Arina Rodionova	(Russia) Yuliya Kalabina (Russia) Marta Sirotkina	7–5, 6–1
Win	19.	22 June 2009	Getxo, Spain	Clay	(Russia) Anastasia Poltoratskaya	(Argentina) Agustina Lepore (Portugal) Frederica Piedade	6–3, 6–1
Loss	11.	29 June 2009	Mont-de-Marsan, France	Clay	(France) Sophie Lefèvre	(Argentina) Jorgelina Cravero (Argentina) María Irigoyen	6–2, 4–6, [7–10]
Loss	12.	24 October 2011	Poitiers, France	Hard	(France) Sophie Lefèvre	(France) Alizé Cornet (France) Virginie Razzano	3–6, 2–6
Win	20.	10 February 2013	Open de l'Isère, France	Carpet (i)	(Czech Republic) Renata Voráčová	(Italy) Nicole Clerico (Spain) Leticia Costas	6–1, 6–4
