= 2004 Gaz de France Stars – Singles =

Singles
- 2004 Gaz de France Stars

Final
- Champion: (Russia) Elena Dementieva
- Runner-up: (Russia) Elena Bovina
- Score: 0–6, 6–0, 6–4

Details
- Draw: 30
- Seeds: 8

Events
Singles	Doubles
Gaz de France Stars	· 2005 →

The singles event at the 2004 Gaz de France Stars took place in late September to early October, 2004, on indoor hard courts in Hasselt, Belgium.

Elena Dementieva won the title with a bizarre scoreline in the final, becoming the first winner of this tournament in an all-Russian final.

== Seeds ==
The top two seeds get a bye into round two.

1. (Russia) Elena Dementieva (champion)
2. (Belgium) Kim Clijsters (semifinals, retired due to a left wrist injury)
3. (Russia) Elena Bovina (final)
4. (Croatia) Karolina Šprem (second round)
5. (Italy) Francesca Schiavone (quarterfinals)
6. (Italy) Silvia Farina Elia (second round)
7. (Bulgaria) Magdalena Maleeva (quarterfinals)
8. (France) Nathalie Dechy (withdrew due to a left thigh sprain)
9. (Croatia) Jelena Kostanić (first round)

== Draw ==
=== Key ===
- Q = Qualifier
- WC = Wild card
- LL = Lucky loser
- Alt = Alternate
- ITF = ITF entry
- PR = Protected ranking
- SR = Special ranking
- SE = Special exempt
- JE = Junior exempt
- JR = Junior Accelerator Programme entrant
- CO = College Accelerator Programme entrant
- NG = Next Gen Accelerator Program entrant
- w/o = Walkover
- r = Retired
- d = Defaulted

=== Finals ===
Semifinals
1	(Russia) Elena Dementieva	6	6
(Italy) Maria Elena Camerin	3	3
3	(Russia) Elena Bovina	6	2
2	(Belgium) Kim Clijsters	4	2^{r}

Final
1	(Russia) Elena Dementieva	0	6	6
3	(Russia) Elena Bovina	6	0	4

=== Top half ===
First round
LL	(Czech Republic) M Paštiková	7	6
(Italy) T Garbin	6^{4}	4
(Czech Republic) D Chládková	6	6
(Spain) A Parra Santonja	1	4
(Ukraine) T Perebiynis	7	3	1
6	(Italy) S Farina Elia	5	6	6
4	(Croatia) K Šprem	4	6	6
(Spain) A Medina Garrigues	6	4	4
LL	(France) C Rousseau	2	0
(Italy) ME Camerin	6	6
(Spain) M Sánchez Lorenzo	6	6
(Luxembourg) C Schaul	3	0
(Spain) V Ruano Pascual	3	7	6
9	(Croatia) J Kostanić	6	6^{3}	4

Second round
1	(Russia) E Dementieva	6	6
LL	(Czech Republic) M Paštiková	4	2
(Czech Republic) D Chládková	6	6
6	(Italy) S Farina Elia	0	2
4	(Croatia) K Šprem	4	4
(Italy) ME Camerin	6	6
(Spain) M Sánchez Lorenzo	4	3
(Spain) V Ruano Pascual	6	6

Quarterfinals
1	(Russia) E Dementieva	7	6
(Czech Republic) D Chládková	5	4
(Italy) ME Camerin	5	7	6
(Spain) V Ruano Pascual	7	5	4

Semifinals
1	(Russia) E Dementieva	6	6
(Italy) ME Camerin	3	3

=== Bottom half ===
First round
5	(Italy) F Schiavone	6	6
(Italy) M Santangelo	2	0
(Spain) N Llagostera Vives	6	6^{4}	6
(Spain) M Marrero	0	7	0
Q	(Germany) V Henke	6	1	6
(Belgium) K Flipkens	2	6	4
WC	(Belgium) C Maes	1	1
3	(Russia) E Bovina	6	6
7/WC	(Bulgaria) M Maleeva	6	6
Q	(United States) L Lee-Waters	3	3
WC	(Belgium) E Callens	7	6
Q	(Czech Republic) E Birnerová	6^{5}	4
(Czech Republic) I Benešová	6	6
Q	(Germany) A Bachmann	4	3

Second round
5	(Italy) F Schiavone	6	6
(Spain) N Llagostera Vives	1	0
Q	(Germany) V Henke	1	3
3	(Russia) E Bovina	6	6
7/WC	(Bulgaria) M Maleeva	6	6
WC	(Belgium) E Callens	0	1
(Czech Republic) I Benešová	6^{3}	2
2	(Belgium) K Clijsters	7	6

Quarterfinals
5	(Italy) F Schiavone	6^{6}	1
3	(Russia) E Bovina	7	6
7/WC	(Bulgaria) M Maleeva	3	4
2	(Belgium) K Clijsters	6	6

Semifinals
3	(Russia) E Bovina	6	2
2	(Belgium) K Clijsters	4	2^{r}
