= Aurélie Védy =

French tennis player

- Country (sports): France
- Residence: Paris
- Born: 8 February 1981 (age 44) France
- Turned pro: 1998
- Retired: 2013
- Plays: Left-handed (two-handed backhand)
- Prize money: $232,909

Singles
- Career record: 253–262
- Career titles: 6 ITF
- Highest ranking: No. 260 (15 May 2006)

Grand Slam singles results
- French Open: 1R (2006)

Doubles
- Career record: 270–181
- Career titles: 33 ITF
- Highest ranking: No. 85 (4 May 2009)

Grand Slam doubles results
- French Open: 2R (2007, 2008)
- Wimbledon: Q1 (2010, 2011)

Aurélie Védy (French pronunciation: [ɔʁeli vedi]; born 8 February 1981) is a French former professional tennis player.

On 15 May 2006, she achieved her career-high singles ranking of world No. 260. On 4 May 2009, Védy peaked at No. 85 in the doubles rankings. In her career, she won six singles and 33 doubles titles on the ITF Women's Circuit.

Védy retired from tennis 2013.

== WTA Tour finals ==
=== Doubles: 1 (runner-up) ===
Winner-Legend
Grand Slam tournaments
Premier M & Premier 5
Premier
International (0–1)

Result	Date	Tournament	Surface	Partner	Opponents	Score
Loss	May 2010	Portugal Open	Clay	(Russia) Vitalia Diatchenko	(Spain) Anabel Medina Garrigues (Romania) Sorana Cîrstea	1–6, 5–7

== ITF Circuit finals ==
Legend
$100,000 tournaments
$75,000 tournaments
$50,000 tournaments
$25,000 tournaments
$10,000 tournaments

=== Singles: 11 (6 titles, 5 runner-ups) ===
Result	No.	Date	Tournament	Surface	Opponent	Score
Loss	1	Apr 1998	ITF Gelos, France	Clay	(Belgium) Justine Henin	0–6, 0–6
Win	1	Apr 1999	ITF Maglie, Italy	Clay	(Ukraine) Tatiana Kovalchuk	6–3, 6–2
Loss	2	Nov 2003	ITF Le Havre, France	Clay (i)	(Spain) Marta Marrero	3–6, 3–6
Win	2	Jun 2004	ITF Orestiada, Greece	Hard	(Greece) Anna Koumantou	6–1, 6–1
Win	3	Aug 2004	ITF İstanbul, Turkey	Hard	(Spain) Gabriela Velasco Andreu	6–0, 7–6^{(9–7)}
Loss	3	May 2005	ITF Antalya, Turkey	Clay	(Romania) Gabriela Niculescu	7–5, 2–6, 2–6
Win	4	Jul 2005	ITF Sezze, Italy	Clay	(Italy) Claudia Ivone	6–1, 6–2
Win	5	Apr 2006	ITF Athens, Greece	Clay	(Germany) Martina Müller	4–6, 6–2, 6–4
Loss	4	Sep 2007	ITF Casale Monferrato, Italy	Clay	(Italy) Valentina Sassi	6–3, 6–7^{(7–9)}, 2–6
Loss	5	Jul 2008	ITF Cremona, Italy	Clay	(Germany) Korina Perkovic	1–6, 4–6
Win	6	Aug 2008	ITF Gardone Val Trompia, Italy	Clay	(Italy) Apollonia Melzani	3–6, 6–2, 6–1

=== Doubles: 56 (33 titles, 23 runner-ups) ===
Result	No.	Date	Tournament	Surface	Partner	Opponents	Score
Win	1.	Jan 1998	ITF Dinan, France	Clay (i)	(France) Camille Pin	(Italy) Tathiana Garbin (Romania) Oana Elena Golimbioschi	w/o
Loss	1.	Apr 1998	ITF Gelos, France	Clay	(Belgium) Justine Henin	(Netherlands) Yvette Basting (France) Emmanuelle Curutchet	6–0, 6–7, 5–7
Win	2.	Aug 1998	Open Saint-Gaudens, France	Clay	(France) Sylvie Sallaberry	(Spain) Paula García (Republic of Ireland) Kelly Liggan	6–3, 7–6
Win	3.	Jul 1999	ITF Le Touquet, France	Clay	(France) Stéphanie Rizzi	(Colombia) Giana Gutiérrez (Slovakia) Silvia Uricková	6–3, 6–7, 6–4
Win	4.	Nov 1999	ITF Le Havre, France	Clay (i)	(France) Stéphanie Rizzi	(Spain) Anna Font (Spain) Veronica Rizhik	6–4, 6–4
Loss	2.	Feb 2000	ITF Mallorca, Spain	Clay	(Sweden) Maria Wolfbrandt	(Austria) Stefanie Haidner (Netherlands) Debby Haak	4–6, 6–3, 4–6
Loss	3.	Jul 2001	ITF Le Touquet, France	Clay	(France) Karla Mraz	(Netherlands) Susanne Trik (Australia) Rochelle Rosenfield	2–6, 4–6
Win	5.	Aug 2001	ITF London, Great Britain	Hard	(Czech Republic) Eva Erbova	(Republic of Ireland) Claire Curran (Sweden) Helena Ejeson	7–6^{(7–4)}, 6–3
Loss	4.	Jan 2002	ITF Grenoble, France	Hard (i)	(France) Karla Mraz	(France) Kildine Chevalier (Madagascar) Natacha Randriantefy	4–6, 4–6
Win	6.	Jul 2002	ITF Sezze, Italy	Clay	(France) Kildine Chevalier	(Israel) Yevgenia Savransky (Slovakia) Martina Babáková	6–3, 7–5
Loss	5.	Aug 2002	ITF Enschede, Netherlands	Clay	(Bulgaria) Dimana Krastevitch	(Austria) Daniela Kix (Germany) Annette Kolb	1–6, 5–7
Win	7.	Sep 2002	ITF Cuneo, Italy	Clay	(France) Karla Mraz	(Italy) Stefania Chieppa (Israel) Yevgenia Savransky	2–6, 6–3, 6–2
Loss	6.	Oct 2002	ITF Ain Sukhna, Egypt	Clay	(Slovenia) Kim Kambic	(Ukraine) Olena Antypina (Czech Republic) Hana Šromová	2–6, 5–7
Loss	7.	Oct 2002	ITF Giza, Egypt	Clay	(Slovenia) Kim Kambic	(Czech Republic) Ema Janašková (Czech Republic) Dominika Luzarová	5–7, 6–7^{(3–7)}
Win	8.	Mar 2003	ITF Amiens, France	Clay (i)	(France) Karla Mraz	(Slovakia) Martina Babáková (Slovakia) Lenka Tvarošková	5–4 ret.
Loss	8.	May 2003	ITF Catania, Italy	Clay	(Greece) Christina Zachariadou	(Spain) Bruna Colosio (Brazil) Joana Cortez	1–6, 1–6
Loss	9.	Jun 2003	ITF Canet-en-Roussillon, France	Clay	(France) Sophie Erre	(Belgium) Leslie Butkiewicz (Belgium) Eveline Vanhyfte	6–4, 3–6, 4–6
Win	9.	Jul 2003	ITF Le Touquet, France	Clay	(Madagascar) Natacha Randriantefy	(Luxembourg) Mandy Minella (France) Pauline Parmentier	6–2, 6–2
Win	10.	Aug 2003	ITF San Marino	Clay	(Romania) Oana Elena Golimbioschi	(France) Kildine Chevalier (Greece) Christina Zachariadou	2–6, 7–6^{(9–7)}, 6–4
Loss	10.	Oct 2003	ITF Bari, Italy	Clay	(Italy) Giulia Meruzzi	(Austria) Betina Pirker (New Zealand) Shelley Stephens	2–6, 2–6
Win	11.	Nov 2003	ITF Villenave-d'Ornon, France	Clay (i)	(Belgium) Caroline Maes	(Israel) Yevgenia Savransky (France) Iryna Brémond	6–3, 7–6^{(8–6)}
Win	12.	Nov 2003	ITF Deauville, France	Clay (i)	(France) Pauline Parmentier	(Bulgaria) Maria Geznenge (Czech Republic) Zuzana Hejdová	5–7, 6–2, 6–1
Win	13.	Jun 2004	ITF Lenzerheide, Switzerland	Clay	(Argentina) Erica Krauth	(Brazil) Joana Cortez (Brazil) Marina Tavares	6–2, 6–4
Win	14.	Jun 2004	ITF Orestiada, Greece	Hard	(France) Mathilde Johansson	(Argentina) Belen Corbalan (Argentina) Luciana Sarmenti	6–0, 6–0
Win	15.	Jul 2004	ITF Garching, Germany	Clay	(Argentina) Erica Krauth	(Germany) Angelika Bachmann (Slovakia) Stanislava Hrozenská	6–4, 7–6^{(7–5)}
Win	16.	Jul 2004	ITF Ancona, Italy	Clay	(Romania) Oana Elena Golimbioschi	(Croatia) Nadja Pavic (Sweden) Aleksandra Srndovic	6–3, 6–3
Win	17.	Aug 2004	ITF Martina Franca, Italy	Clay	(Germany) Jasmin Wöhr	(Russia) Nina Bratchikova (Italy) Giulia Casoni	6–1, 3–6, 7–6^{(8–6)}
Win	18.	Oct 2004	ITF Quartu Sant'Elena, Italy	Hard	(France) Anaïs Laurendon	(Czech Republic) Sandra Záhlavová (Italy) Raffaella Bindi	6–3, 3–6, 6–3
Win	19.	Mar 2005	ITF Athens, Greece	Clay	(Australia) Lauren Breadmore	(Romania) Mădălina Gojnea (Romania) Lenore Lăzăroiu	6–3, 7–5
Loss	11.	Apr 2005	Open de Biarritz, France	Clay	(Switzerland) Timea Bacsinszky	(France) Stéphanie Cohen-Aloro (Tunisia) Selima Sfar	2–6, 1–6
Loss	12.	Oct 2005	Open Nantes Atlantique, France	Hard (i)	(Canada) Marie-Ève Pelletier	(France) Mailyne Andrieux (Czech Republic) Renata Voráčová	7–6^{(7–3)}, 5–7, 2–6
Win	20.	Feb 2006	ITF Stockholm, Sweden	Hard (i)	(Switzerland) Timea Bacsinszky	(South Africa) Surina De Beer (United Kingdom) Anne Keothavong	6–4, 6–4
Win	21.	Apr 2006	Open de Cagnes-sur-Mer, France	Clay	(France) Sophie Lefèvre	(Austria) Daniela Klemenschits (Austria) Sandra Klemenschits	2–6, 6–4, 7–6^{(7–1)}
Win	22.	Jul 2006	ITF Bastad, Sweden	Clay	(Argentina) Erica Krauth	(Romania) Mihaela Buzărnescu (Romania) Magda Mihalache	2–6, 6–4, 6–4
Win	23.	Jul 2006	ITF Monteroni d'Arbia, Italy	Clay	(Italy) Valentina Sassi	(Croatia) Matea Mezak (Croatia) Nika Ožegović	5–7, 6–4, 6–0
Win	24.	Aug 2006	ITF Martina Franca, Italy	Clay	(Croatia) Ivana Abramović	(Romania) Edina Gallovits (Bosnia and Herzegovina) Mervana Jugić-Salkić	6–3, 6–2
Loss	13.	Apr 2007	ITF Dinan, France	Clay (i)	(France) Stéphanie Foretz	(Germany) Angelique Kerber (Austria) Yvonne Meusburger	4–6, 7–6^{(8–6)}, 2–6
Win	25.	Apr 2007	Open de Cagnes-sur-Mer, France	Clay	(Switzerland) Timea Bacsinszky	(Slovakia) Katarína Kachlíková (Russia) Anastasia Pavlyuchenkova	7–5, 7–5
Loss	14.	Oct 2007	ITF Sant Cugat, Spain	Clay	(Hungary) Kira Nagy	(Spain) Nuria Llagostera Vives (Spain) María José Martínez Sánchez	4–6, 1–6
Loss	15.	Mar 2008	ITF New Delhi, India	Hard	(United States) Sunitha Rao	(China) Ji Chunmei (China) Sun Shengnan	6–2, 2–6, [4–10]
Loss	16.	May 2008	Open de Saint-Gaudens, France	Clay	(South Africa) Chanelle Scheepers	(Chinese Taipei) Hsieh Su-wei (Canada) Marie-Ève Pelletier	4–6, 0–6
Win	26.	Jun 2008	Open de Marseille, France	Clay	(Romania) Ágnes Szatmári	(Ukraine) Viktoria Kutuzova (Russia) Anna Lapushchenkova	6–4, 6–3
Win	27.	Jul 2008	Contrexéville Open, France	Clay	(France) Stéphanie Foretz	(Argentina) Erica Krauth (Sweden) Hanna Nooni	6–4, 6–4
Win	28.	Aug 2008	ITF Monteroni d'Arbia, Italy	Clay	(Bosnia and Herzegovina) Mervana Jugić-Salkić	(Italy) Valentina Sulpizio (Italy) Verdiana Verardi	6–4, 6–2
Win	29.	Sep 2008	ITF Mestre, Italy	Clay	(Bosnia and Herzegovina) Mervana Jugić-Salkić	(Georgia (country)) Margalita Chakhnashvili (France) Violette Huck	6–2, 6–3
Win	30.	Apr 2009	ITF Civitavecchia, Italy	Clay	(Argentina) Erica Krauth	(Belarus) Darya Kustova (Belarus) Tatiana Poutchek	6–1, 6–1
Loss	17.	Jul 2009	ITF Zwevegem, Belgium	Clay	(Japan) Yurika Sema	(Russia) Elena Chalova (Croatia) Darija Jurak	1–6, 4–6
Loss	18.	Sep 2009	Open de Saint-Malo, France	Clay	(Slovenia) Andreja Klepač	(Switzerland) Timea Bacsinszky (Italy) Tathiana Garbin	3–6, ret.
Loss	19.	Oct 2009	Open de Touraine, France	Hard (i)	(France) Stéphanie Cohen-Aloro	(France) Youlia Fedossova (Tunisia) Selima Sfar	6–4, 0–6, [8–10]
Win	31.	Jan 2010	ITF Plantation, United States	Clay	(United States) Mashona Washington	(Argentina) Jorgelina Cravero (Argentina) María Irigoyen	6–0, 6–2
Win	32.	Jan 2010	ITF Lutz, United States	Clay	(United States) Mashona Washington	(Brazil) Maria Fernanda Alves (Argentina) Florencia Molinero	6–3, 6–3
Loss	20.	Jun 2010	Open de Marseille, France	Clay	(France) Stéphanie Cohen-Aloro	(Sweden) Johanna Larsson (Austria) Yvonne Meusburger	4–6, 2–6
Loss	21.	Sep 2010	ITF Biella, Italy	Clay	(Slovenia) Andreja Klepač	(Ukraine) Mariya Koryttseva (Romania) Raluca Olaru	5–7, 4–6
Loss	22.	Jan 2011	Open de l'Isère, France	Hard (i)	(France) Iryna Brémond	(France) Stéphanie Cohen-Aloro (Tunisia) Selima Sfar	1–6, 3–6
Win	33.	May 2011	Open de Saint-Gaudens, France	Clay	(France) Caroline Garcia	(Russia) Anastasia Pivovarova (Ukraine) Olga Savchuk	6–3, 6–3
Loss	23.	Oct 2011	Open de Limoges, France	Hard (i)	(France) Caroline Garcia	(Sweden) Sofia Arvidsson (United States) Jill Craybas	4–6, 6–4, [7–10]
