= Monika Schneider =

Polish tennis player

- Country (sports): Poland
- Born: 12 August 1983 (age 41); Siedlce, Poland
- Plays: Right-handed
- Prize money: $17,305

Singles
- Career record: 57–70
- Career titles: 0
- Highest ranking: No. 484 (16 June 2003)

Doubles
- Career record: 45–41
- Career titles: 2 ITF
- Highest ranking: No. 434 (24 May 2004)

Monika Schneider (born 12 August 1983) is a former professional tennis player from Poland.

== Biography ==
Schneider, who was born in Siedlce, was ranked as high as 19th in the world during her junior career, which included wins over Jelena Janković and Svetlana Kuznetsova. A right-handed player, she played in two Fed Cup ties for Poland, against Slovenia and Romania in 2000. On the professional tour, she won two ITF doubles titles, both partnering Olga Brózda. Her last performance on the ITF Circuit was in November 2005.

Based in the UAE, Schneider works as a coach at Dubai's Elite Tennis Academy.

== ITF Circuit finals ==
=== Singles: 1 (runner-up) ===
Outcome	No.	Date	Tournament	Surface	Opponent	Score
Runner-up	1.	8 June 2003	ITF Ankara, Turkey	Clay	(Ukraine) Olga Lazarchuk	4–6, 4–6

=== Doubles: 6 (2 titles, 4 runner-ups) ===
Outcome	No.	Date	Tournament	Surface	Partner	Opponents	Score
Runner-up	1.	19 May 2003	ITF Olecko, Poland	Clay	(Poland) Alicja Rosolska	(Belarus) Ekaterina Dzehalevich (Australia) Michelle Summerside	2–6, 6–1, 4–6
Runner-up	2.	10 August 2003	ITF Gdynia, Poland	Clay	(Latvia) Irina Kuzmina-Rimša	(Poland) Klaudia Jans-Ignacik (Poland) Alicja Rosolska	5–7, 2–6
Runner-up	3.	16 November 2003	ITF Le Havre, France	Clay (i)	(Slovakia) Martina Babáková	(Belgium) Leslie Butkiewicz (Belgium) Eveline Vanhyfte	2–6, 2–2 ret.
Winner	1.	3 May 2004	ITF Warsaw, Poland	Clay	(Poland) Olga Brózda	(Ukraine) Natalia Bogdanova (Ukraine) Valeria Bondarenko	2–6, 6–4, 6–2
Runner-up	4.	14 May 2005	ITF Falkenberg, Sweden	Clay	(Poland) Natalia Kołat	(Sweden) Mari Andersson (Sweden) Johanna Larsson	1–6, 1–6
Winner	2.	19 July 2005	ITF Düsseldorf, Germany	Clay	(Poland) Olga Brózda	(Montenegro) Danica Krstajić (Russia) Elena Chalova	1–6, 6–1, 6–2

== See also ==
- List of Poland Fed Cup team representatives
