= Daniëlle Harmsen =

Dutch tennis player

Danielle Harmsen
- Country (sports): Netherlands
- Born: 25 January 1986 (age 39) Velsen, Netherlands
- Turned pro: 2004
- Retired: 2013
- Plays: Left-handed (two-handed backhand)
- Prize money: $72,194

Singles
- Career record: 214–140
- Career titles: 5 ITF
- Highest ranking: No. 406 (4 October 2010)

Doubles
- Career record: 223–88
- Career titles: 33 ITF
- Highest ranking: No. 213 (24 September 2012)

Danielle Harmsen (born 25 January 1986) is a Dutch former professional tennis player.

On 4 October 2010, she reached her highest WTA singles ranking of No. 406 whilst her best doubles ranking was 213 in September 2012.

Over her career, she won five singles titles and 33 doubles titles on the ITF Women's Circuit. She won the Dutch Championships in 2006. Harmsen retired from tennis 2013.

== ITF Circuit finals ==
$25,000 tournaments
$15,000 tournaments
$10,000 tournaments

=== Singles: 15 (5 titles, 10 runner-ups) ===
Result	No.	Date	Location	Surface	Opponent	Score
Win	1.	25 June 2006	Alkmaar, Netherlands	Clay	(Netherlands) Pauline Wong	6–1, 6–1
Win	2.	26 June 2006	Heerhugowaard, Netherlands	Clay	(Belgium) Debbrich Feys	6–1, 1–6, 6–4
Loss	3.	2 September 2007	Enschede, Netherlands	Clay	(Netherlands) Pauline Wong	6–7^{(1–7)}, 4–6
Loss	4.	23 June 2008	Breda, Netherlands	Clay	(Russia) Olga Kalyuzhnaya	6–4, 2–6, 4–6
Win	5.	13 July 2008	Brussels, Belgium	Clay	(France) Émilie Bacquet	6–1, 6–2
Loss	6.	17 August 2008	Koksijde, Belgium	Clay	(Luxembourg) Claudine Schaul	6–7^{(2–7)}, 6–7^{(7–9)}
Loss	7.	22 June 2009	Rotterdam, Netherlands	Clay	(France) Iryna Brémond	4–6, 2–6
Loss	8.	4 April 2010	Antalya, Turkey	Clay	(Russia) Valentyna Ivakhnenko	3–6, 6–7^{(5–77)}
Loss	9.	27 June 2010	Rotterdam, Netherlands	Clay	(Netherlands) Kiki Bertens	4–6, 2–6
Loss	10.	13 March 2011	Antalya, Turkey	Clay	(Netherlands) Bibiane Weijers	0–6, 6–4, 3–6
Loss	11.	19 June 2011	Alkmaar, Netherlands	Clay	(United Kingdom) Eleanor Dean	7–6^{(7–1)}, 3–6, 1–6
Loss	12.	11 July 2011	Iași, Romania	Clay	(Romania) Diana Enache	6–7^{(9–11)}, 2–6
Win	13.	26 November 2011	Antalya, Turkey	Clay	(Russia) Julia Parasyuk	6–1, 6–2
Win	14.	5 February 2012	Antalya, Turkey	Clay	(Italy) Martina di Giuseppe	6–3, 6–4
Loss	15.	24 June 2012	Craiova, Romania	Clay	(Romania) Sabina Lupu	2–6, 4–6

=== Doubles: 50 (33 titles, 17 runner-ups) ===
Result	No.	Date	Location	Surface	Partner	Opponents	Score
Loss	1.	4 July 2004	Heerhugowaard, Netherlands	Clay	(Netherlands) Susanne Trik	(Sweden) Aleksandra Srndovic (Australia) Kristen van Elden	1–6, 2–6
Loss	2.	10 January 2005	Stuttgart, Germany	Hard	(Netherlands) Eva Pera	(Bosnia and Herzegovina) Mervana Jugić-Salkić (Croatia) Darija Jurak	3–6, 5–7
Loss	3.	11 September 2005	Enschede, Netherlands	Clay	(Netherlands) Nicole Thyssen	(Netherlands) Kelly de Beer (Netherlands) Eva Pera	4–6, 4–6
Loss	4.	25 June 2006	Alkmaar, Netherlands	Clay	(Netherlands) Eva Pera	(Belgium) Jessie de Vries (Belgium) Debbrich Feys	5–7, 6–4, 6–7^{(4–7)}
Loss	5.	2 July 2006	Heerhugowaard, Netherlands	Clay	(Netherlands) Alexandra Poorta	(Netherlands) Karen Nijssen (Netherlands) Renée Reinhard	5–7, 3–6
Win	6.	13 August 2006	Rebecq, Belgium	Clay	(Belgium) Jessie de Vries	(France) Claire de Gubernatis (Italy) Verdiana Verardi	6–4, 6–2
Win	7.	27 August 2006	Vlaardingen, Netherlands	Clay	(Netherlands) Eva Pera	(China) Guo Xuanyu (China) Zhou Yimiao	6–2, 7–6^{(7–2)}
Loss	8.	17 March 2007	Rome, Italy	Clay	(Austria) Marlena Metzinger	(Belarus) Darya Kustova (Italy) Giulia Gatto-Monticone	4–6, 1–6
Loss	9.	19 June 2007	Alkmaar, Netherlands	Clay	(Netherlands) Claire Lablans	(Poland) Olga Brózda (Poland) Natalia Kołat	3–6, 6–3, 3–6
Win	10.	26 August 2007	Vlaardingen, Netherlands	Clay	(Netherlands) Renée Reinhard	(Netherlands) Talitha De Groot (Russia) Anna Savitskaya	3–6, 6–4, 6–2
Win	11.	10 September 2007	Alphen aan den Rijn, Netherlands	Clay	(Netherlands) Renée Reinhard	(South Africa) Kelly Anderson (United States) Kady Pooler	6–2, 6–4
Loss	12.	5 November 2007	Redbridge, UK	Hard	(Netherlands) Renée Reinhard	(United Kingdom) Naomi Broady (Poland) Patrycja Sanduska	6–0, 1–6, [5–10]
Loss	13.	11 November 2007	Sunderland, UK	Hard	(Netherlands) Renée Reinhard	(United Kingdom) Katharina Brown (United Kingdom) Elizabeth Thomas	3–6, 1–6
Win	14.	26 January 2008	Kaarst, Germany	Carpet (i)	(Netherlands) Chayenne Ewijk	(Serbia) Neda Kozić (Russia) Anastasia Poltoratskaya	6–4, 6–1
Loss	15.	4 February 2008	Algarve, Portugal	Hard	(Portugal) Neuza Silva	(Ukraine) Kateryna Herth (Russia) Nina Bratchikova	4–6, 3–6
Win	16.	24 March 2008	Tessenderlo, Belgium	Clay	(Netherlands) Marlot Meddens	(Russia) Maria Kondratieva (Poland) Olga Brózda	6–4, 6–4
Win	17.	22 June 2008	Alkmaar, Netherlands	Clay	(Netherlands) Renée Reinhard	(Serbia) Neda Kozić (Russia) Anastasia Poltoratskaya	6–2, 7–6^{(12–10)}
Win	18.	29 June 2008	Breda, Netherlands	Clay	(Netherlands) Renée Reinhard	(Belarus) Ima Bohush (Ukraine) Lesia Tsurenko	w/o
Win	19.	13 July 2008	Brussels, Belgium	Clay	(Netherlands) Kim Kilsdonk	(Belarus) Volha Duko (Belgium) Ineke Mergaert	6–4, 5–3 ret.
Win	20.	18 July 2008	Zwevegem, Belgium	Clay	(Netherlands) Kim Kilsdonk	(Slovenia) Tadeja Majerič (Czech Republic) Iveta Gerlová	6–4, 6–2
Loss	21.	21 July 2008	Horb, Germany	Clay	(Netherlands) Kim Kilsdonk	(Czech Republic) Simona Dobrá (Czech Republic) Lucie Kriegsmannová	6–2, 3–6, [8–10]
Win	22.	5 November 2008	Sunderland, UK	Hard (i)	(Netherlands) Kim Kilsdonk	(United Kingdom) Tara Moore (United Kingdom) Katharina Brown	6–7^{(4–7)}, 6–4, [10–4]
Win	23.	13 November 2008	Jersey, UK	Hard (i)	(Netherlands) Kim Kilsdonk	(United Kingdom) Tara Moore (United Kingdom) Elizabeth Thomas	7–6^{(7–4)}, 6–4
Win	24.	15 March 2009	Dijon, France	Hard	(Netherlands) Kim Kilsdonk	(United Kingdom) Amanda Elliott (France) Violette Huck	7–6^{(7–2)}, 6–1
Win	25.	4 April 2009	Pelham, United States	Clay	(Netherlands) Kim Kilsdonk	(Portugal) Frederica Piedade (Canada) Marie-Ève Pelletier	6–4, 5–7, [11–9]
Loss	26.	30 August 2009	Enschede, Netherlands	Clay	(Netherlands) Kim Kilsdonk	(Netherlands) Quirine Lemoine (Netherlands) Sabine van der Sar	2–6, 6–4, [8–10]
Loss	27.	6 September 2009	Almere, Netherlands	Clay	(Netherlands) Kim Kilsdonk	(Netherlands) Kiki Bertens (Netherlands) Nicole Thyssen	6–4, 2–6, [4–10]
Loss	28.	8 November 2009	Sunderland, UK	Hard (i)	(Netherlands) Josanne van Bennekom	(United Kingdom) Jennifer Ren (United Kingdom) Jessica Ren	6–3, 4–6, [8–10]
Win	29.	14 November 2009	Jersey, UK	Hard (i)	(Netherlands) Kiki Bertens	(Hungary) Tímea Babos (Denmark) Malou Ejdesgaard	7–5, 7–5
Win	30.	21 March 2010	Antalya, Turkey	Clay	(Netherlands) Kiki Bertens	(Chile) Andrea Koch-Benvenuto (Oman) Fatma Al-Nabhani	6–2, 6–4
Win	31.	12 September 2010	Alphen aan den Rijn, Netherlands	Clay	(Netherlands) Bibiane Weijers	(Russia) Ksenia Lykina (France) Irena Pavlovic	6–3, 6–2
Win	32.	17 January 2011	Stuttgart, Germany	Hard (i)	(Russia) Marina Melnikova	(Slovakia) Jana Čepelová (Slovakia) Michaela Pochabová	3–6, 6–4, [14–12]
Win	33.	13 February 2011	Mallorca, Spain	Clay	(Germany) Scarlett Werner	(Hungary) Réka Luca Jani (Switzerland) Conny Perrin	6–4, 6–3
Win	34.	12 March 2011	Antalya, Turkey	Clay	(Netherlands) Bibiane Weijers	(Russia) Maria Zharkova (Russia) Eugeniya Pashkova	6–3, 7–5
Win	35.	18 April 2011	Civitavecchia, Italy	Clay	(Hungary) Réka Luca Jani	(Romania) Diana Enache (Romania) Liana Ungur	6–2, 6–3
Win	36.	4 July 2011	Craiova, Romania	Clay	(Romania) Diana Enache	(Romania) Elena Bogdan (Romania) Mihaela Buzărnescu	4–6, 7–6^{(7–5)}, [10–6]
Win	37.	11 July 2011	Iași, Romania	Clay	(Romania) Diana Enache	(Romania) Ionela-Andreea Iova (Italy) Andreea Văideanu	6–4, 6–1
Win	38.	5 September 2011	Alphen aan den Rijn, Netherlands	Clay	(Romania) Diana Enache	(Poland) Katarzyna Piter (Poland) Barbara Sobaszkiewicz	6–2, 6–7^{(4–7)}, [11–9]
Loss	39.	17 October 2011	Antalya, Turkey	Clay	(Romania) Diana Enache	(Georgia (country)) Sofia Kvatsabaia (Ukraine) Maryna Zanevska	4–6, 1–6
Win	40.	24 October 2011	Antalya, Turkey	Clay	(Romania) Diana Enache	(Romania) Laura Ioana Andrei (Romania) Camelia Hristea	6–0, 6–3
Win	41.	21 November 2011	Antalya, Turkey	Clay	(Romania) Diana Enache	(Slovenia) Dalila Jakupović (Germany) Sarah-Rebecca Sekulic	6–1, 6–3
Win	42.	28 November 2011	Antalya, Turkey	Clay	(Romania) Diana Enache	(Romania) Elena-Teodora Cadar (Romania) Ioana Loredana Roșca	7–5, 6–2
Win	43.	30 January 2012	Antalya, Turkey	Clay	(Romania) Diana Enache	(Belarus) Ilona Kremen (Japan) Emi Mutaguchi	6–0, 1–6, [10–6]
Win	44.	6 February 2012	Antalya, Turkey	Clay	(Romania) Diana Enache	(Turkey) Seda Arantekin (Turkey) Hülya Esen	7–6^{(7–5)}, 6–1
Loss	45.	2 July 2012	Rovereto, Italy	Clay	(Romania) Diana Buzean	(France) Estelle Guisard (Italy) Julia Mayr	3–6, 3–6
Win	46.	30 July 2012	Rebecq, Belgium	Clay	(Romania) Diana Buzean	(Netherlands) Lesley Kerkhove (Russia) Marina Melnikova	6–4, 6–2
Win	47.	6 August 2012	Koksijde, Belgium	Clay	(Romania) Diana Buzean	(France) Myrtille Georges (France) Céline Ghesquière	3–6, 6–3, [10–5]
Win	48.	3 September 2012	Alphen aan den Rijn, Netherlands	Clay	(Romania) Diana Buzean	(Italy) Corinna Dentoni (Germany) Justine Ozga	6–2, 6–0
Win	49.	29 October 2012	Antalya, Turkey	Clay	(Romania) Diana Buzean	(Turkey) Hülya Esen (Turkey) Lütfiye Esen	4–6, 6–1, [10–3]
Loss	50.	5 November 2012	Antalya, Turkey	Clay	(Romania) Diana Buzean	(Hungary) Ágnes Bukta (Czech Republic) Petra Krejsová	w/o
