= Eveline Vanhyfte =

Belgian tennis player

- Country (sports): Belgium
- Born: 19 March 1984 (age 41)
- Prize money: $22,328

Singles
- Career record: 77–67
- Career titles: 1 ITF
- Highest ranking: No. 362 (5 July 2004)

Doubles
- Career record: 41–33
- Career titles: 4 ITF
- Highest ranking: No. 282 (15 November 2004)

Eveline Vanhyfte (born 19 March 1984) is a Belgian former professional tennis player.

== Biography ==
Vanhyfte began competing professionally in 2001 and won her only ITF singles title in 2003, at Heerhugowaard.

As a doubles player, she won four titles on the ITF Circuit, all partnering Leslie Butkiewicz. She formed a wildcard pairing with Butkiewicz in the doubles event at the Hasselt Cup in 2004, which was her only WTA Tour main-draw appearance.

In both 2004 and 2005, Vanhyfte featured in the Belgium Fed Cup squad. Not used in 2004, her opportunity came when an understrength Belgium faced the United States in the 2005 World Group quarter-final, held in Delray Beach. Ranked 392 in the world at the time, she was beaten in the singles by the world No. 1, Lindsay Davenport, in a one-sided 39 minute match. She also played in the doubles rubber with Kirsten Flipkens.

== ITF Circuit finals ==
=== Singles (1–1) ===
Result	Date	Tournament	Surface	Opponent	Score
Win	6 July 2003	ITF Heerhugowaard, Netherlands	Clay	(Germany) Christiane Hoppmann	6–3, 6–3
Loss	24 August 2003	ITF Westende, Belgium	Clay	(Turkey) İpek Şenoğlu	3–6, 2–6

=== Doubles (4–2) ===
Result	Date	Tournament	Surface	Partner	Opponents	Score
Win	15 June 2003	ITF Canet-en-Roussillon, France	Clay	(Belgium) Leslie Butkiewicz	(France) Sophie Erre (France) Aurélie Védy	4–6, 6–3, 6–4
Loss	24 August 2003	ITF Westende, Belgium	Clay	(Turkey) İpek Şenoğlu	(Belgium) Leslie Butkiewicz (Netherlands) Kim Kilsdonk	4–6, 2–6
Win	16 November 2003	ITF Le Havre, France	Clay (i)	(Belgium) Leslie Butkiewicz	(Slovakia) Martina Babáková (Poland) Monika Schneider	6–2, 2–2 ret.
Loss	18 July 2004	ITF Brussels, Belgium	Clay	(Belgium) Leslie Butkiewicz	(Czech Republic) Zuzana Černá (Czech Republic) Eva Hrdinová	6–7^{(3)}, 6–7^{(5)}
Win	29 August 2004	ITF Alphen a/d Rijn, Netherlands	Clay	(Belgium) Leslie Butkiewicz	(Austria) Daniela Klemenschits (Austria) Sandra Klemenschits	7–5, 6–3
Win	28 August 2005	ITF Westende, Belgium	Hard	(Belgium) Leslie Butkiewicz	(France) Claire de Gubernatis (Spain) Anna Font]	6–4, 6–2
