= Leslie Butkiewicz =

Belgian tennis player (born 1982)

- Country (sports): Belgium
- Born: 26 May 1982 (age 43) Antwerp, Belgium
- Plays: Right-handed
- Prize money: $62,804

Singles
- Career record: 162–99
- Career titles: 9 ITF
- Highest ranking: No. 341 (10 June 2002)

Doubles
- Career record: 135–77
- Career titles: 15 ITF
- Highest ranking: No. 224 (17 February 2003)

Team competitions
- Fed Cup: 0–2

Leslie Butkiewicz (born 26 May 1982) is a former tennis player from Belgium.

== Biography ==
Butkiewicz, a right-handed player, won nine singles and 15 doubles titles on the ITF Circuit.

She also featured in the main draw of the doubles at several WTA Tour events, including five appearances at her home tournament in Antwerp.

Both of the Fed Cup ties she played in for Belgium came against the United States. In 2005, she lost a dead rubber singles match to Venus Williams in the quarterfinals of the World Group. The following year, she partnered Caroline Maes in the doubles of the World Group semifinal against the United States, which was also a dead rubber. She was a member of the Belgian squad that lost the 2006 World Group final to Italy, but was unused.

== ITF Circuit finals ==
$25,000 tournaments
$10,000 tournaments

=== Singles: 10 (9–1) ===
Result	No.	Date	Tournament	Surface	Opponent	Score
Win	1.	17 June 2001	ITF Raalte, Netherlands	Clay	(Netherlands) Anouk Sterk	5–7, 6–3, 6–2
Win	2.	19 August 2002	ITF Westende, Belgium	Hard	(France) Virginie Pichet	6–4, 6–3
Win	3.	1 September 2002	ITF Alphen aan den Rijn, Netherlands	Clay	(Bulgaria) Dimana Krastevitch	6–3, 6–3
Win	4.	14 July 2003	ITF Brussels, Belgium	Clay	(Belgium) Debbrich Feys	4–6, 6–4, 6–1
Win	5.	19 July 2004	ITF Zwevegem, Belgium	Clay	(Russia) Ekaterina Kirianova	6–3, 6–1
Win	6.	16 August 2004	ITF Westende, Belgium	Hard	(Finland) Emma Laine	7–6^{(7–4)}, 7–6^{(7–4)}
Win	7.	3 October 2004	Open Nantes Atlantique, France	Hard (i)	(Hungary) Rita Kuti-Kis	6–2, 6–1
Win	8.	16 July 2005	ITF Brussels, Belgium	Clay	(France) Claire de Gubernatis	5–7, 6–1, 6–4
Win	9.	13 November 2005	ITF Le Havre, France	Clay (i)	(France) Émilie Bacquet	7–5, 6–3
Loss	10.	15 July 2007	ITF Brussels, Belgium	Clay	(France) Nathalie Mohn	4–6, 6–7^{(6–8)}

=== Doubles: 30 (15–15) ===
Result	No.	Date	Tournament	Surface	Partner	Opponents	Score
Win	1.	14 August 2000	ITF Koksijde, Belgium	Clay	(Czech Republic) Lenka Snajdrova	(France) Marion Bartoli (Spain) Carmen Cajo	6–3, 6–4
Win	2.	23 September 2001	GB Pro-Series Glasgow, United Kingdom	Hard (i)	(Belgium) Patty Van Acker	(Sweden) Helena Ejeson (Czech Republic) Eva Erbová	6–2, 6–2
Loss	3.	11 November 2001	ITF Villenave-d'Ornon, France	Clay (i)	(Belgium) Caroline Maes	(Uruguay) Daniela Olivera (Madagascar) Natacha Randriantefy	4–6, 2–6
Loss	4.	24 March 2002	ITF Cholet, France	Clay	(Belgium) Patty Van Acker	(Czech Republic) Caroline Maes (Czech Republic) Gabriela Navrátilová	1–4 ret.
Loss	5.	17 June 2002	ITF Lenzerheide, Switzerland	Clay	(Belgium) Patty Van Acker	(Australia) Nicole Sewell (Australia) Samantha Stosur	4–6, 3–6
Win	6.	30 June 2002	ITF Fontanafredda, Italy	Clay	(Belgium) Patty Van Acker	(Netherlands) Susanne Trik (Australia) Kristen van Elden	7–5, 6–3
Loss	7.	5 August 2002	ITF Rebecq, Belgium	Clay	(Netherlands) Tessy van de Ven	(Belgium) Elke Clijsters (Australia) Jaslyn Hewitt	6–3, 3–6, 4–6
Win	8.	18 August 2002	ITF Westende, Belgium	Clay	(Australia) Nicole Kriz	(Ukraine) Valeria Bondarenko (Lithuania) Edita Liachovičiūtė	6–1, 7–6^{(4–7)}
Loss	9.	20 January 2003	Open de l'Isère, France	Hard (i)	(Netherlands) Kim Kilsdonk	(France) Séverine Beltrame (France) Amandine Dulon	7–5, 6–7^{(2–7)}, 6–7^{(4–7)}
Loss	10.	18 February 2003	ITF Buchen, Germany	Carpet (i)	(Netherlands) Kim Kilsdonk	(Romania) Magda Mihalache (Germany) Syna Schmidle	2–6, 3–6
Win	11.	15 June 2003	ITF Canet-en-Roussillon, France	Clay	(Belgium) Eveline Vanhyfte	(France) Sophie Erre (France) Aurélie Védy	4–6, 6–3, 6–4
Win	12.	23 June 2003	ITF Alkmaar, Netherlands	Clay	(Netherlands) Kim Kilsdonk	(Netherlands) Marielle Hoogland (Netherlands) Jolanda Mens	6–1, 6–4
Win	13.	14 July 2003	ITF Brussels, Belgium	Clay	(Czech Republic) Lenka Snajdrova	(Belgium) Debbrich Feys (Belgium) Jessie de Vries	6–3, 6–1
Loss	14.	21 July 2003	ITF Horb, Germany	Clay	(Netherlands) Kim Kilsdonk	(Russia) Maria Kondratieva (New Zealand) Shelley Stephens	3–6, 6–3, 3–6
Loss	15.	4 August 2003	ITF Rebecq, Belgium	Clay	(Netherlands) Kim Kilsdonk	(France) Anne-Laure Heitz (France) Amandine Singla	6–0, 6–7^{(3–7)}, 5–7
Win	16.	24 August 2003	ITF Middelkerke, Belgium	Clay	(Netherlands) Kim Kilsdonk	(Turkey) İpek Şenoğlu (Belgium) Eveline Vanhyfte	6–4, 6–2
Loss	17.	12 October 2003	Open de Touraine, France	Hard (i)	(Belgium) Caroline Maes	(Latvia) Līga Dekmeijere (Germany) Bianka Lamade	1–6, 2–6
Win	18.	16 November 2003	ITF Le Havre, France	Clay (i)	(Belgium) Eveline Vanhyfte	(Slovakia) Martina Babáková (Poland) Monika Schneider	6–2, 2–2 ret.
Loss	19.	18 July 2004	ITF Brussels, Belgium	Clay	(Belgium) Eveline Vanhyfte	(Czech Republic) Zuzana Černá (Czech Republic) Eva Hrdinová	6–7^{(3–7)}, 6–7^{(5–7)}
Loss	20.	25 July 2004	ITF Zwevegem, Belgium	Clay	(New Zealand) Shelley Stephens	(Czech Republic) Zuzana Černá (Canada) Aneta Soukup	3–6, 2–6
Win	21.	9 August 2004	ITF Koksijde, Belgium	Clay	(New Zealand) Shelley Stephens	(Belgium) Jessie de Vries (Belgium) Debbrich Feys	6–2, 7–5
Win	22.	29 August 2004	ITF Alphen aan den Rijn, Netherlands	Clay	(Belgium) Eveline Vanhyfte	(Austria) Daniela Klemenschits (Austria) Sandra Klemenschits	7–5, 6–3
Loss	23.	12 July 2005	ITF Brussels, Belgium	Clay	(Belgium) Caroline Maes	(Czech Republic) Iveta Gerlová (Germany) Carmen Klaschka	5–7, 2–6
Win	24.	24 July 2005	ITF Zwevegem, Belgium	Clay	(Belgium) Caroline Maes	(Czech Republic) Petra Cetkovská (Spain) Gabriela Velasco Andreu	6–3, 6–2
Win	25.	14 August 2005	ITF Rebecq, Belgium	Clay	(Belgium) Jessie de Vries	(Netherlands) Kim Kilsdonk (Serbia and Montenegro) Neda Kozić	w/o
Win	26.	28 August 2005	ITF Westende, Belgium	Hard	(Belgium) Eveline Vanhyfte	(France) Claire de Gubernatis (Spain) Anna Font Estrada	6–4, 6–2
Win	27.	22 July 2006	ITF Zwevegem, Belgium	Clay	(Belgium) Caroline Maes	(Poland) Olga Brózda (Poland) Natalia Kołat	6–2, 6–2
Loss	28.	27 August 2006	ITF Westende, Belgium	Hard	(France) Émilie Bacquet	(France) Celine Cattaneo (France) Claire de Gubernatis	6–7^{(4–7)}, 3–6
Loss	29.	26 August 2006	ITF Alphen aan den Rijn, Netherlands	Clay	(Belgium) Caroline Maes	(Slovenia) Andreja Klepač (Montenegro) Danica Krstajić	2–6, 6–7
Loss	30.	24 August 2007	ITF Westende, Belgium	Hard	(United Kingdom) Katharina Brown	(France) Claire de Gubernatis (France) Samantha Schoeffel	6–4, 2–6, 2–6
