= Debbrich Feys =

Belgian tennis player (born 1984)

- Country (sports): Belgium
- Born: 20 December 1984 (age 41) Ghent, Belgium
- Turned pro: October 2005
- Retired: 2014
- Plays: Right (two-handed backhand)
- Prize money: $64,960

Singles
- Career record: 139–175
- Career titles: 1 ITF
- Highest ranking: No. 341 (10 March 2008)

Doubles
- Career record: 79–89
- Career titles: 6 ITF
- Highest ranking: No. 178 (11 February 2008)

Debbrich Feys (born 20 December 1984, in Ghent) is a Belgian former professional tennis player. Her career-high singles ranking is world No. 341, which she reached in March 2008. Her highest doubles ranking is No. 178, achieved in February 2008.

In her career, she won seven titles on the ITF Women's Circuit- one in singles and six in doubles. She played on the WTA Tour on numerous occasions.

== Biography ==
Feys started playing tennis at the age of nine and preferred hardcourts. She turned professional after playing in the first round of the 2005 Hasselt Open, losing in round one in the doubles event.

She participated at the 2008 Canara Bank Bangalore Open in the doubles event with Angelika Bachmann, but was eliminated in round one against Ji Chunmei and Sun Shengnan.

Feys played her last pro match 2009. She retired from tennis 2014.

== ITF finals ==
$25,000 tournaments
$10,000 tournaments

=== Singles (1–2) ===
Result	No.	Date	Location	Surface	Opponent	Score
Loss	1.	14 July 2003	Brussels, Belgium	Clay	(Belgium) Leslie Butkiewicz	6–4, 4–6, 1–6
Loss	2.	26 June 2006	Heerhugowaard, Netherlands	Clay	(Netherlands) Danielle Harmsen	1–6, 6–1, 4–6
Win	3.	10 March 2007	Benin City, Nigeria	Hard	(Brazil) Ana Clara Duarte	6–7^{(6–8)}, 6–4, 6–4

=== Doubles (6–7) ===
Result	No.	Date	Location	Surface	Partner	Opponents	Score
Loss	1.	7 August 2000	Rebecq, Belgium	Clay	(Belgium) Karin Kues	(Croatia) Jelena Pandžić (Czech Republic) Lenka Snajdrova	7–6, 2–6, 4–6
Loss	2.	14 July 2003	Brussels, Belgium	Clay	(Belgium) Jessie de Vries	(Belgium) Leslie Butkiewicz (Czech Republic) Lenka Snajdrova	3–6, 1–6
Loss	3.	2 August 2004	Rebecq, Belgium	Clay	(Belgium) Jessie de Vries	(Romania) Liana Ungur (Germany) Antonela Voina	2–6, 7–5, 4–6
Loss	4.	9 August 2004	Koksijde, Belgium	Clay	(Belgium) Jessie de Vries	(Belgium) Leslie Butkiewicz (New Zealand) Shelley Stephens	2–6, 5–7
Win	5.	8 April 2006	Dubai, United Arab Emirates	Hard	(Germany) Diana Vrânceanu	(South Africa) Tegan Edwards (Armenia) Ofelya Poghosyan	6–1, 6–2
Win	6.	25 June 2006	Alkmaar, Netherlands	Clay	(Belgium) Jessie de Vries	(Netherlands) Danielle Harmsen (Netherlands) Eva Pera	7–5, 4–6, 7–6
Loss	7.	15 August 2006	Koksijde, Belgium	Clay	(Belgium) Jessie de Vries	(France) Émilie Bacquet (Belgium) Valerie Verhamme	6–7^{(3)}, 6–7^{(3)}
Loss	8.	3 March 2007	Benin City, Nigeria	Hard	(Ukraine) Kateryna Polunina	(Brazil) Ana Clara Duarte (Venezuela) Mariana Muci	6–3, 3–6, 5–7
Win	9.	10 March 2007	Benin City, Nigeria	Hard	(Ukraine) Kateryna Polunina	(Brazil) Ana Clara Duarte (Venezuela) Mariana Muci	6–3, 6–4
Win	10.	4 May 2007	Catania, Italy	Clay	(Belarus) Darya Kustova	(New Zealand) Leanne Baker (Australia) Nicole Kriz	6–4, 6–4
Loss	11.	13 October 2007	Saltillo, Mexico	Hard	(Netherlands) Leonie Mekel	(Argentina) Soledad Esperón (South Africa) Chanelle Scheepers	0–6, 4–6
Win	12.	21 October 2007	San Luis Potosí, Mexico	Hard	(South Africa) Chanelle Scheepers	(Uruguay) Estefanía Craciún (Argentina) Betina Jozami	6–1, 6–4
Win	13.	18 August 2008	Westende, Belgium	Hard	(Finland) Emma Laine	(Spain) Rebeca Bou Nogueiro (Russia) Julia Parasyuk	7–5, 7–5
