= Jennifer Russell (tennis) =

American tennis player

- Full name: Jennifer Rebecca Russell
- Country (sports): United States
- Born: August 7, 1978 (age 47) Houston, Texas, U.S.
- Prize money: $211,593

Singles
- Career record: 58–81
- Highest ranking: No. 319 (May 28, 2001)

Doubles
- Career record: 158–132
- Career titles: 1
- Highest ranking: No. 41 (June 13, 2005)

Grand Slam doubles results
- Australian Open: QF (2005)
- French Open: 2R (2002, 2004)
- Wimbledon: 3R (2004)
- US Open: 2R (2002)

Jennifer Russell (born Jennifer Rebecca Embry, August 7, 1978) is an American former professional tennis player.

Russell was ranked in top 50 for doubles and as high as number 41, in November 2005. Before joining th WTA Tour, she had won 13 titles on the ITF Women's Circuit. She won her first WTA doubles title at the Gaz de France Stars in 2004, partnered with Mara Santangelo. In 2004, they reached the third round at Wimbledon, before being beaten by Martina Navratilova and Lisa Raymond. In 2005, they reached the quarterfinals at the Australian Open. Russell is a graduate of Purdue University and was one of the highest ranked professional players ever to have also been a college graduate player. Jennifer Embry married Jeff Russell on May 1, 2004. She now has two children, Isabella Mae, born 2006, and Chloe Nicole, born 2009.
