= Gaz de France Stars =

Defunct tennis tournament
- Founded: 2004
- Abolished: 2006
- Editions: 3
- Location: Hasselt; Belgium
- Venue: Ethias Arena
- Category: Tier III
- Surface: Hard / indoor
- Draw: 32M/32Q/16D
- Prize money: $175,000

Gaz de France Stars, also known by its non-sponsored name, the Hasselt Cup, was a women's tennis tournament held at the Ethias Arena in Hasselt, Belgium. Held from 2004 till 2006, this WTA Tour event was categorized as a Tier III-tournament and was played on indoor hardcourts.

== Finals ==
=== Singles ===
| Year | Champion | Runner-up | Score |
|---|---|---|---|
| 2004 | (Russia) Elena Dementieva | (Russia) Elena Bovina | 0–6, 6–0, 6–4 |
| 2005 | (Belgium) Kim Clijsters | (Italy) Francesca Schiavone | 6–2, 6–3 |
| 2006 | (Belgium) Kim Clijsters | (Estonia) Kaia Kanepi | 6–3, 3–6, 6–4 |

=== Doubles ===
| Year | Champions | Runners-up | Score |
|---|---|---|---|
| 2004 | (United States) Jennifer Russell & (Italy) Mara Santangelo | (Spain) Nuria Llagostera & (Spain) Marta Marrero | 6–3, 7–5 |
| 2005 | (France) Émilie Loit & (Slovenia) Katarina Srebotnik | (Netherlands) Michaëlla Krajicek & (Hungary) Ágnes Szávay | 6–3, 6–4 |
| 2006 | (United States) Lisa Raymond & (Australia) Samantha Stosur | (Greece) Eleni Daniilidou & (Germany) Jasmin Wöhr | 6–2, 6–3 |

== See also ==
- List of tennis tournaments
