= Jessie de Vries =

Belgian tennis player

- Country (sports): Belgium
- Born: 26 January 1984 (age 41)
- Plays: Right-handed
- Prize money: $9,581

Singles
- Highest ranking: No. 827 (11 July 2005)

Doubles
- Career record: 49–39
- Career titles: 4 ITF
- Highest ranking: No. 492 (29 August 2005)

Jessie de Vries (born 26 January 1984) is a former professional tennis player from Belgium. On 11 July 2005, she reached her highest WTA singles ranking of 827. Over her career from 2000 to 2006, she played ten doubles finals on the ITF Women's Circuit winning four of them.

Her only WTA Tour main-draw appearance came 2004 at the Gaz de France Stars in Hasselt, Belgium where she partnered Debbrich Feys; they lost in the first round to Croatian Jelena Kostanić and Claudine Schaul from Luxembourg, 0–6, 1–6.
