= Laura Ioana Paar =

Romanian tennis player

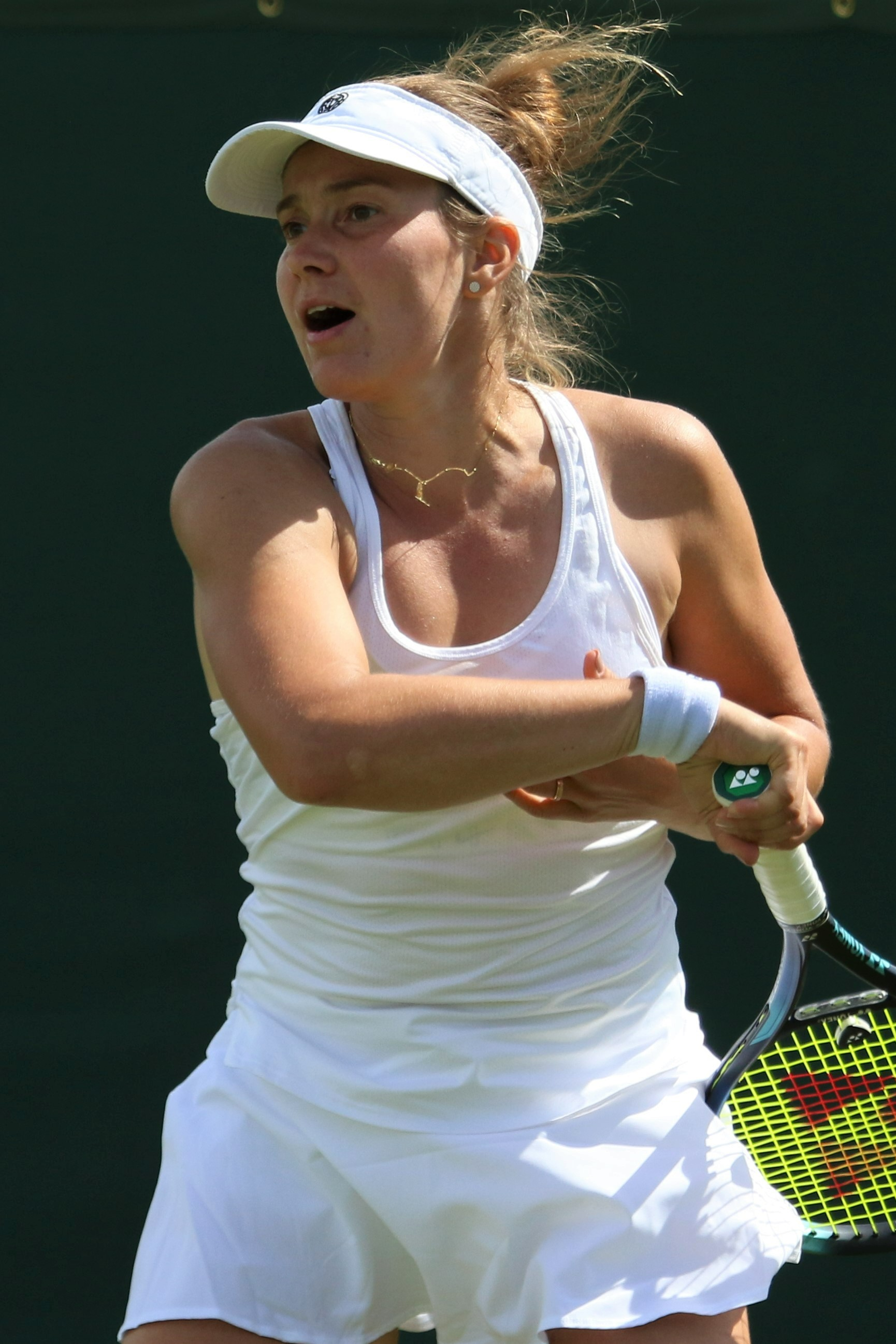
- Paar at the 2022 Wimbledon Championships
- Country (sports): Romania
- Residence: Bucharest, Romania
- Born: 31 May 1988 (age 38) Bucharest, Socialist Republic of Romania
- Height: 1.73 m (5 ft 8 in)
- Plays: Right (two-handed backhand)
- Prize money: $364,580

Singles
- Career record: 455–271
- Career titles: 13 ITF
- Highest ranking: No. 190 (1 February 2021)

Grand Slam singles results
- Australian Open: Q2 (2020)
- French Open: Q2 (2020)
- Wimbledon: Q1 (2022)

Doubles
- Career record: 399–196
- Career titles: 1 WTA, 53 ITF
- Highest ranking: No. 113 (9 March 2020)

Grand Slam doubles results
- French Open: 1R (2020)

Laura Ioana Paar (née Andrei; born 31 May 1988) is an inactive Romanian tennis player. She has career-high WTA rankings of 190 in singles, achieved on 31 January 2021, and 113 in doubles, set on 9 March 2020.

Laura has won one WTA Tour doubles title, 2020 at the Lyon Open, as well as 13 singles and 53 doubles titles on the ITF Circuit.

== Career ==
She started tennis at age six and has been coached by German Calin Alexandru Paar whom she married.

In December 2016, she won the singles and the doubles at the ITF Cordenons tournament.

On 19 May 2019, she made her WTA Tour debut when she entered the main draw of the Nürnberger Versicherungscup by defeating Raluca Șerban in the qualifying round.

Paar has never competed for the Romania Fed Cup team.

== WTA Tour finals ==
=== Doubles: 1 (title) ===
Legend WTA 500 WTA 250 (1–0)	Finals by surface Hard (1–0) Clay (0–0)

Result	Date	Tournament	Tier	Surface	Partner	Opponents	Score
Win	Mar 2020	Lyon Open, France	International (Note: The WTA International tournaments were reclassified as WTA 250 tournaments in 2021.)	Hard (i)	(Germany) Julia Wachaczyk	(Netherlands) Lesley Pattinama Kerkhove (Netherlands) Bibiane Schoofs	7–5, 6–4

== ITF Circuit finals ==
Legend
$100,000 tournaments
$25,000 tournaments
$10/15,000 tournaments

=== Singles: 30 (13 titles, 17 runner-ups) ===
Result	W–L	Date	Tournament	Tier	Surface	Opponent	Score
Loss	0–1	Sep 2008	ITF Budapest, Hungary	10,000	Clay	(Romania) Irina-Camelia Begu	5–7, 1–6
Loss	0–2	Mar 2009	ITF Dijon, France	10,000	Hard (i)	(France) Violette Huck	4–6, 6–7^{(2)}
Loss	0–3	Sep 2010	ITF İstanbul, Turkey	10,000	Hard	(Italy) Annalisa Bona	2–6, 2–6
Win	1–3	Nov 2010	ITF Le Havre, France	10,000	Clay (i)	(France) Céline Ghesquière	6–2, 6–4
Loss	1–4	Mar 2011	ITF Madrid, Spain	10,000	Clay	(Spain) Estrella Cabeza Candela	3–6, 2–6
Loss	1–5	May 2011	ITF Bucharest, Romania	10,000	Clay	(Romania) Elora Dabija	4–6, 2–6
Loss	1–6	Aug 2011	ITF Bucharest, Romania	10,000	Clay	(Ukraine) Viktoriya Kutuzova	2–6, 5–7
Loss	1–7	Nov 2011	ITF Antalya, Turkey	10,000	Clay	(Serbia) Natalija Kostić	4–6, 6–2, 2–6
Win	2–7	July 2012	ITF Ankara, Turkey	10,000	Clay	(Uzbekistan) Sabina Sharipova	6–1, 6–0
Loss	2–8	Aug 2012	Bursa Cup, Turkey	10,000	Clay	(Russia) Victoria Kan	7–6^{(4)}, 6–4
Win	3–8	Aug 2012	ITF Bucharest, Romania	10,000	Clay	(Belgium) Catherine Chantraine	6–0, 6–1
Win	4–8	Oct 2012	ITF Dubrovnik, Croatia	10,000	Clay	(Slovakia) Lenka Juríková	3–6, 6–4, 6–2
Loss	4–9	Nov 2012	ITF Antalya, Turkey	10,000	Clay	(Hungary) Ágnes Bukta	2–6, 7–5, 3–6
Loss	4–10	Nov 2012	ITF Antalya, Turkey	10,000	Clay	(Serbia) Jovana Jakšić	2–6, 0–6
Loss	4–11	Nov 2012	ITF Antalya, Turkey	10,000	Clay	(Belgium) Marie Benoît	3–6, 2–6
Win	5–11	Feb 2013	ITF Antalya, Turkey	10,000	Clay	(Spain) Eva Fernández Brugués	6–2, 4–6, 6–2
Loss	5–12	Jun 2013	ITF Bucharest, Romania	10,000	Clay	(Romania) Irina Bara	4–6, 4–6
Win	6–12	Jun 2013	ITF Balș, Romania	10,000	Clay	(Moldova) Anastasia Vdovenco	6–7^{(3)}, 7–6^{(4)}, 7–6^{(3)}
Win	7–12	Nov 2015	Ismaning Open, Germany	10,000	Carpet (i)	(Croatia) Adrijana Lekaj	6–2, 6–2
Loss	7–13	Aug 2016	ITF Arad, Romania	10,000	Clay	(Slovakia) Chantal Škamlová	2–6, 6–3, 4–6
Loss	7–14	Sep 2016	ITF Prague, Czech Republic	10,000	Clay	(Czech Republic) Magdalena Pantůčková	2–6, 7–6^{(4)}, 2–6
Loss	7–15	Oct 2016	ITF Stockholm, Sweden	10,000	Hard (i)	(Poland) Iga Świątek	4–6, 3–6
Win	8–15	Dec 2016	ITF Cordenons, Italy	10,000	Carpet (i)	(Germany) Laura Schaeder	6–4, 6–2
Win	9–15	Dec 2016	ITF Ortisei, Italy	10,000	Hard (i)	(Italy) Deborah Chiesa	6–2, 6–7^{(5)}, 6–4
Win	10–15	Apr 2017	ITF Sharm El Sheikh, Egypt	15,000	Hard	(Moldova) Anastasia Vdovenco	6–1, 6–1
Loss	10–16	Apr 2017	ITF Sharm El Sheikh	15,000	Hard	(Germany) Sarah-Rebecca Sekulic	7–6^{(5)}, 6–7^{(2)}, 2–6
Win	11–16	Feb 2018	ITF Sharm El Sheikh	15,000	Hard	(Russia) Anna Pribylova	6–3, 6–1
Win	12–16	Jan 2019	ITF Stuttgart, Germany	15,000	Hard (i)	(Finland) Anastasia Kulikova	6–3, 6–1
Win	13–16	Apr 2019	ITF Sunderland, UK	25,000	Hard (i)	(United Kingdom) Harriet Dart	7–5, 4–6, 6–2
Loss	13–17	Nov 2019	ITF Pétange, Luxembourg	25,000	Hard (i)	(Netherlands) Arantxa Rus	3–6, 6–3, 3–6

=== Doubles: 88 (53 titles, 35 runner-ups) ===
Result	W–L	Date	Tournament	Tier	Surface	Partner	Opponents	Score
Loss	0–1	Mar 2006	ITF El Mansoura, Egypt	10,000	Clay	(Serbia) Vojislava Lukić	(Ukraine) Katerina Avdiyenko (Belarus) Iryna Kuryanovich	2–6, 1–6
Loss	0–2	Apr 2006	ITF Cairo, Egypt	10,000	Clay	(Serbia) Vojislava Lukić	(Russia) Galina Fokina (Russia) Raissa Gourevitch	6–7^{(2)}, 7–5, 4–6
Win	1–2	Jun 2006	ITF Mediaş, Romania	10,000	Clay	(Romania) Andrada Dinu	(Romania) Raluca Ciulei (Romania) Diana Enache	7–5, 7–5
Win	2–2	Jul 2006	ITF Arad, Romania	10,000	Clay	(Romania) Gabriela Niculescu	(Serbia) Karolina Jovanović (Serbia) Neda Kozić	6–2, 6–3
Win	3–2	Aug 2006	ITF Bucharest, Romania	10,000	Clay	(Romania) Gabriela Niculescu	(Romania) Maria Luiza Crăciun (Romania) Ágnes Szatmári	6–3, 3–6, 6–4
Win	4–2	Sep 2006	ITF Bucharest, Romania	10,000	Clay	(Romania) Maria Luiza Crăciun	(Romania) Diana Enache (Romania) Antonia Xenia Tout	6–4, 1–6, 6–3
Loss	4–3	Apr 2007	ITF Cairo, Egypt	10,000	Clay	(Romania) Antonia Xenia Tout	(Russia) Galina Fokina (Egypt) Yasmin Hamza	0–6, 6–2, 1–6
Loss	4–4	May 2007	ITF Bucharest, Romania	10,000	Clay	(Romania) Ioana Gașpar	(Romania) Simona Halep (Romania) Ionela-Andreea Iova	4–6, 6–2, 3–6
Loss	4–5	May 2007	ITF Bucharest, Romania	10,000	Clay	(Romania) Ioana Gașpar	(Romania) Irina-Camelia Begu (Romania) Simona Halep	4–6, 2–6
Win	5–5	Jun 2007	ITF Piteşti, Romania	10,000	Clay	(Romania) Raluca Ciulei	(Romania) Diana Enache (Romania) Antonia Xenia Tout	6–2, 6–4
Loss	5–6	Jun 2007	ITF Bucharest, Romania	25,000	Clay	(Romania) Mădălina Gojnea	(Germany) Julia Görges (Serbia) Vojislava Lukić	2–6, 4–6
Loss	5–7	Aug 2007	ITF Hunedoara, Romania	10,000	Clay	(Romania) Irina-Camelia Begu	(Romania) Diana Enache (Romania) Antonia Xenia Tout	6–3, 4–6, 4–6
Loss	5–8	Apr 2008	ITF San Severo, Italy	10,000	Clay	(Chinese Taipei) Chen Yi	(Italy) Benedetta Davato (Italy) Lisa Sabino	3–6, 6–7^{(3)}
Win	6–8	Jun 2008	ITF Piteşti, Romania	10,000	Clay	(Romania) Mihaela Buzărnescu	(Romania) Simona Matei (Italy) Valentina Sulpizio	7–5, 3–6, [10–2]
Win	7–8	Jun 2008	ITF Craiova, Romania	10,000	Clay	(Romania) Diana Enache	(Romania) Irina-Camelia Begu (Romania) Alexandra Damaschin	6–3, 6–1
Win	8–8	Jun 2008	ITF Bucharest, Romania	10,000	Clay	(Romania) Mihaela Buzărnescu	(Italy) Benedetta Davato (Italy) Valentina Sulpizio	6–4, 4–6, [10–6]
Loss	8–9	Jul 2008	ITF Balş, Romania	10,000	Clay	(Romania) Diana Enache	(Romania) Camelia Hristea (Romania) Ionela-Andreea Iova	6–2, 4–6, [8–10]
Win	9–9	Aug 2008	ITF Arad, Romania	10,000	Clay	(Romania) Diana Enache	(Romania) Elora Dabija (Romania) Cristina Mitu	3–6, 6–2, [10–6]
Loss	9–10	Aug 2008	ITF Vienna, Austria	10,000	Clay	(Austria) Nikola Hofmanova	(Slovakia) Ľudmila Cervanová (Slovakia) Katarína Maráčková	6–0, 3–6, [11–13]
Win	10–10	Aug 2008	ITF Bucharest, Romania	10,000	Clay	(Romania) Irina-Camelia Begu	(Ukraine) Lyudmyla Kichenok (Ukraine) Nadiia Kichenok	6–2, 3–6, [10–6]
Win	11–10	Sep 2008	ITF Braşov, Romania	10,000	Clay	(Romania) Irina-Camelia Begu	(Romania) Bianca Hîncu (Romania) Cristina Stancu	6–2, 6–2
Win	12–10	Sep 2008	ITF Budapest, Hungary	10,000	Clay	(Romania) Irina-Camelia Begu	(Belgium) Davinia Lobbinger (Israel) Efrat Mishor	6–2, 6–4
Win	13–10	Sep 2008	ITF Sandanski, Bulgaria	10,000	Clay	(Poland) Sylwia Zagórska	(Romania) Elena Bogdan (Ukraine) Alyona Sotnikova	6–3, 6–1
Loss	13–11	Oct 2008	GB Pro-Series Glasgow, UK	25,000	Hard (i)	(Romania) Irina-Camelia Begu	(Switzerland) Stefania Boffa (United Kingdom) Amanda Elliott	4–6, 6–7^{(3)}
Win	14–11	May 2009	ITF Bucharest, Romania	10,000	Clay	(Romania) Diana Gae	(Bulgaria) Dessislava Mladenova (Bulgaria) Dalia Zafirova	6–1, 5–7, [14–12]
Win	15–11	Jun 2009	ITF Bucharest, Romania	10,000	Clay	(Romania) Ioana Gașpar	(Romania) Simona Matei (Romania) Cristina Mitu	6–3, 7–6^{(3)}
Loss	15–12	Jun 2009	ITF Bucharest, Romania	10,000	Clay	(Romania) Ioana Gașpar	(Romania) Mihaela Buzărnescu (Romania) Elora Dabija	6–1, 5–7, [5–10]
Win	16–12	Jul 2009	ITF Les Contamines, France	25,000	Hard	(Poland) Patrycja Sanduska	(France) Anaïs Laurendon (Switzerland) Nicole Riner	6–3, 6–2
Win	17–12	May 2010	ITF Bucharest, Romania	10,000	Clay	(Romania) Mădălina Gojnea	(Romania) Diana Enache (Romania) Cristina Mitu	6–4, 3–6, [10–7]
Win	18–12	Jun 2010	ITF Bucharest, Romania	10,000	Clay	(Romania) Mădălina Gojnea	(Romania) Elora Dabija (Romania) Ioana Gașpar	6–2, 6–4
Win	19–12	Aug 2010	ITF Oneşti, Romania	10,000	Clay	(Romania) Mihaela Buzărnescu	(Romania) Camelia Hristea (Bulgaria) Biljana Pawlowa-Dimitrova	7–6^{(7)}, 6–2
Win	20–12	Aug 2010	ITF Bucharest, Romania	10,000	Clay	(Romania) Mihaela Buzărnescu	(Romania) Diana Enache (Romania) Camelia Hristea	6–1, 6–3
Loss	20–13	Nov 2010	ITF Le Havre, France	10,000	Clay (i)	(Belgium) Michaela Boev	(France) Céline Ghesquière (France) Andrea Ka	5–7, 5–7
Win	21–13	Apr 2011	ITF Antalya, Turkey	10,000	Clay	(Poland) Sylwia Zagórska	(Russia) Marta Sirotkina (Russia) Maria Zharkova	6–1, 7–6^{(0)}
Win	22–13	Apr 2011	ITF Antalya, Turkey	10,000	Clay	(Georgia (country)) Ekaterine Gorgodze	(Russia) Aleksandra Romanova (Russia) Maria Zharkova	6–1, 7–5
Win	23–13	May 2011	ITF Istanbul, Turkey	10,000	Clay	(Georgia (country)) Sofia Kvatsabaia	(Bulgaria) Dessislava Mladenova (Slovenia) Anja Prislan	6–2, 6–2
Win	24–13	May 2011	ITF Bucharest, Romania	10,000	Clay	(Romania) Camelia Hristea	(Finland) Cecilia Estlander (Austria) Katharina Negrin	7–6^{(5)}, 6–1
Loss	24–14	Jun 2011	Open de Marseille, France	100,000	Clay	(Romania) Mădălina Gojnea	(Romania) Irina-Camelia Begu (Russia) Nina Bratchikova	2–6, 2–6
Win	25–14	Aug 2011	ITF Bucharest, Romania	10,000	Clay	(Romania) Camelia Hristea	(Romania) Ionela-Andreea Iova (Italy) Andreea Văideanu	6–1, 7–5
Loss	25–15	Oct 2011	ITF Dobrich, Bulgaria	25,000	Clay	(Romania) Cristina Dinu	(Romania) Diana Marcu (Romania) Cristina Mitu	6–4, 3–6, [6–10]
Loss	25–16	Oct 2011	ITF Antalya, Turkey	10,000	Clay	(Romania) Camelia Hristea	(Romania) Diana Enache (Netherlands) Daniëlle Harmsen	0–6, 3–6
Loss	25–17	Nov 2011	ITF Antalya, Turkey	10,000	Clay	(Romania) Raluca Elena Platon	(Hungary) Vaszilisza Bulgakova (Czech Republic) Martina Kubičíková	7–6^{(3)}, 2–6, [12–10]
Win	26–17	Nov 2011	ITF Antalya, Turkey	10,000	Clay	(Romania) Raluca Elena Platon	(Hungary) Vaszilisza Bulgakova (Russia) Elena Kulikova	6–4, 6–1
Loss	26–18	Dec 2011	ITF Antalya, Turkey	10,000	Clay	(Romania) Raluca Elena Platon	(Turkey) Hülya Esen (Turkey) Lütfiye Esen	0–6, 6–1, [7–10]
Loss	26–19	Jun 2012	ITF Craiova, Romania	10,000	Clay	(Romania) Raluca Elena Platon	(Romania) Camelia Hristea (Romania) Alice-Andrada Radu	0–6, 6–3, [6–10]
Win	27–19	Jun 2012	ITF Balș, Romania	10,000	Clay	(Romania) Raluca Elena Platon	(Romania) Camelia Hristea (Romania) Alice-Andrada Radu	5–7, 6–3, [10–8]
Win	28–19	Jul 2012	Ankara Cup, Turkey	10,000	Hard	(Slovakia) Zuzana Zlochová	(Japan) Kazusa Ito (Japan) Kaori Onishi	4–6, 6–0, [10–4]
Win	29–19	Aug 2012	Bursa Cup, Turkey	10,000	Clay	(Austria) Melanie Klaffner	(Japan) Erika Takao (Japan) Remi Tezuka	6–2, 6–2
Win	30–19	Aug 2012	ITF Bucharest, Romania	10,000	Clay	(Romania) Raluca Elena Platon	(Moldova) Julia Helbet (Ukraine) Sofiko Kadzhaya	3–6, 6–2, [10–5]
Win	31–19	Nov 2012	ITF Antalya, Turkey	10,000	Clay	(Romania) Raluca Elena Platon	(Turkey) Hülya Esen (Turkey) Lütfiye Esen	6–4, 3–6, [10–7]
Loss	31–20	Nov 2012	ITF Antalya, Turkey	10,000	Clay	(Austria) Janina Toljan	(Russia) Eugeniya Pashkova (Ukraine) Anastasiya Vasylyeva	6–4, 3–6, [2–10]
Win	32–20	Jun 2013	ITF Bucharest, Romania	10,000	Clay	(Romania) Raluca Elena Platon	(Romania) Raluca Ciufrila (Romania) Andreea Ghitescu	6–2, 7–6^{(2)}
Loss	32–21	Jul 2013	Open Porte du Hainaut, France	25,000	Clay	(Bulgaria) Dia Evtimova	(Argentina) Tatiana Búa (Spain) Arabela Fernández Rabener	5–7, 2–6
Win	33–21	Aug 2013	ITF Bad Saulgau, Germany	25,000	Clay	(Romania) Elena Bogdan	(Czech Republic) Barbora Krejčíková (Czech Republic) Kateřina Siniaková	6–7^{(11)}, 6–4, [10–8]
Loss	33–22	Aug 2013	Ladies Open Hechingen, Germany	25,000	Clay	(France) Laura Thorpe	(Czech Republic) Barbora Krejčíková (Czech Republic) Kateřina Siniaková	1–6, 4–6
Loss	33–23	Dec 2013	ITF Mérida, Mexico	25,000	Hard	(Russia) Marina Melnikova	(Argentina) Vanesa Furlanetto (Argentina) Florencia Molinero	6–2, 6–7^{(8)}, [7–10]
Loss	33–24	Feb 2014	ITF Antalya, Turkey	10,000	Clay	(Belarus) Sviatlana Pirazhenka	(Bosnia and Herzegovina) Anita Husarić (Ukraine) Alyona Sotnikova	7–5, 4–6, [6–10]
Win	34–24	Sep 2016	ITF Prague, Czech Republic	10,000	Clay	(Germany) Sarah-Rebecca Sekulic	(Czech Republic) Miriam Kolodziejová (Czech Republic) Vendula Žovincová	6–4, 6–2
Win	35–24	Oct 2016	ITF Stockholm, Sweden	10,000	Hard (i)	(Germany) Anna Klasen	(Sweden) Mirjam Björklund (Sweden) Brenda Njuki	6–2, 6–2
Win	36–24	Nov 2016	ITF Helsinki, Finland	10,000	Hard (i)	(Denmark) Karen Barritza	(Russia) Alina Silich (Russia) Valeriya Zeleva	6–4, 6–3
Win	37–24	Dec 2016	ITF Cordenons, Italy	10,000	Carpet (i)	(Ukraine) Anastasia Zarytska	(Switzerland) Nina Stadler (Germany) Caroline Werner	6–0, 7–6^{(3)}
Win	38–24	Dec 2016	ITF Ortisei, Italy	10,000	Hard (i)	(Germany) Sarah-Rebecca Sekulic	(Kyrgyzstan) Ksenia Palkina (Italy) Anna-Giulia Remondina	6–2, 6–3
Loss	38–25	Feb 2017	GB Pro-Series Glasgow, UK	15,000	Hard (i)	(Czech Republic) Petra Krejsová	(United Kingdom) Jocelyn Rae (United Kingdom) Anna Smith	3–6, 2–6
Win	39–25	Mar 2017	ITF Solarino, Italy	15,000	Carpet	(Czech Republic) Petra Krejsová	(Switzerland) Ylena In-Albon (Italy) Tatiana Pieri	6–0, 6–3
Win	40–25	Mar 2017	ITF Solarino, Italy	15,000	Carpet	(Czech Republic) Petra Krejsová	(Italy) Georgia Brescia (Switzerland) Ylena In-Albon	6–3, 6–2
Win	41–25	Apr 2017	ITF Sharm El Sheikh, Egypt	15,000	Hard	(Austria) Melanie Klaffner	(Denmark) Emilie Francati (Sweden) Kajsa Rinaldo Persson	6–4, 7–5
Loss	41–26	Apr 2017	ITF Sharm El Sheikh, Egypt	15,000	Hard	(Austria) Melanie Klaffner	(Montenegro) Ana Veselinović (China) You Xiaodi	6–2, 5–7, [11–13]
Win	42–26	Jun 2017	Macha Lake Open, Czech Republic	25,000	Clay	(Czech Republic) Anastasia Zarycká	(Germany) Tayisiya Morderger (Germany) Yana Morderger	6–3, 6–4
Loss	42–27	Jun 2017	ITF Lund, Sweden	25,000	Clay	(Germany) Julia Wachaczyk	(Sweden) Ida Jarlskog (Sweden) Fanny Östlund	2–6, 7–6^{(4)}, [12–14]
Win	43–27	Jul 2017	ITF Darmstadt, Germany	25,000	Clay	(Czech Republic) Anastasia Zarycká	(Egypt) Sandra Samir (Liechtenstein) Kathinka von Deichmann	4–6, 7–6^{(5)}, [10–3]
Win	44–27	Aug 2017	GB Pro-Series Foxhills, UK	25,000	Hard	(Czech Republic) Petra Krejsová	(Romania) Mihaela Buzărnescu (Poland) Justyna Jegiołka	4–6, 6–2, [11–9]
Win	45–27	Aug 2017	ITF Chiswick, UK	25,000	Hard	(Germany) Julia Wachaczyk	(United Kingdom) Katy Dunne (Bulgaria) Elitsa Kostova	7–5, 7–5
Win	46–27	Sep 2017	Székesfehérvár Open, Hungary	15,000	Clay	(Romania) Elena Bogdan	(Hungary) Réka Luca Jani (Hungary) Panna Udvardy	1–6, 6–2, [10–7]
Win	47–27	Jan 2018	ITF Stuttgart, Germany	15,000	Hard (i)	(Romania) Raluca Șerban	(Czech Republic) Petra Krejsová (Czech Republic) Jesika Malečková	6–0, 6–7^{(7)}, [10–5]
Loss	47–28	Feb 2018	ITF Sharm El Sheikh, Egypt	15,000	Hard	(Belgium) Hélène Scholsen	(Poland) Katarzyna Kawa (United Kingdom) Emily Webley-Smith	3–6, 6–3, [5–10]
Loss	47–29	Feb 2018	ITF Sharm El Sheikh, Egypt	15,000	Hard	(Germany) Julia Kimmelmann	(Russia) Anastasia Pribylova (United Kingdom) Emily Webley-Smith	3–6, 3–6
Loss	47–30	Mar 2018	ITF Sharm El Sheikh, Egypt	15,000	Hard	(Bulgaria) Julia Terziyska	(Belarus) Yuliya Hatouka (Chinese Taipei) Lee Pei-chi	6–4, 6–7^{(5)}, [8–10]
Loss	47–31	Mar 2018	ITF Sharm El Sheikh, Egypt	15,000	Hard	(Bulgaria) Julia Terziyska	(Thailand) Kamonwan Buayam (Russia) Angelina Gabueva	6–1, 4–6, [5–10]
Loss	47–32	Jun 2018	ITF Óbidos, Portugal	25,000	Carpet	(Germany) Julia Wachaczyk	(Russia) Amina Anshba (Georgia (country)) Sofia Shapatava	7–6^{(4)}, 0–6, [9–11]
Loss	47–33	Oct 2018	ITF Oslo, Norway	25,000	Hard (i)	(Belgium) Hélène Scholsen	(United Kingdom) Harriet Dart (Sweden) Cornelia Lister	6–7^{(3)}, 5–7
Win	48–33	Jan 2019	ITF Stammheim, Germany	W15	Hard (i)	(Germany) Julia Wachaczyk	(Luxembourg) Eléonora Molinaro (Latvia) Daniela Vismane	7–5, 6–0
Win	49–33	Feb 2019	Trnava Indoor, Slovakia	W25	Hard (i)	(Czech Republic) Anastasia Zarycká	(Poland) Maja Chwalińska (Czech Republic) Miriam Kolodziejová	6–4, 6–3
Loss	49–34	Apr 2019	ITF Bolton, UK	W25	Hard (i)	(Belgium) Hélène Scholsen	(United Kingdom) Alicia Barnett (United Kingdom) Jodie Burrage	3–6, 3–6
Loss	49–35	Jun 2019	Manchester Trophy, UK	W100	Grass	(United States) Robin Anderson	(China) Duan Yingying (China) Zhu Lin	4–6, 3–6
Win	50–35	Nov 2019	ITF Pétange, Luxembourg	W25	Hard (i)	(Germany) Julia Wachaczyk	(Poland) Katarzyna Piter (Netherlands) Arantxa Rus	7–6^{(11)}, 1–6, [11–9]
Win	51–35	Nov 2019	ITF Saint-Étienne, France	W25	Hard (i)	(Russia) Marina Melnikova	(Spain) Cristina Bucșa (Germany) Julia Wachaczyk	6–3, 6–7^{(7)}, [11–9]
Win	52–35	Feb 2020	Trnava Indoor, Slovakia	W25	Hard (i)	(Czech Republic) Miriam Kolodziejová	(Russia) Victoria Kan (Ukraine) Ganna Poznikhirenko	6–1, 6–1
Win	53–35	Feb 2020	AK Ladies Open, Germany	W25	Carpet (i)	(Romania) Andreea Mitu	(United Kingdom) Anna Popescu (United States) Chiara Scholl	7–5, 6–2
