= Antonia Xenia Tout =

Romanian tennis player (born 1986)

- Country (sports): Romania
- Born: 2 July 1986 (age 39)
- Prize money: $28,494

Singles
- Career titles: 0
- Highest ranking: No. 483 (24 July 2006)

Doubles
- Career record: 102–61
- Career titles: 9 ITF
- Highest ranking: No. 374 (19 March 2007)

Antonia Xenia Tout (born 2 July 1986) is a Romanian former professional tennis player.

Tout, who comes from the city of Satu Mare, is the daughter of Romanian footballer Anton, who played for local club Olimpia.

Most successful in doubles, Tout won nine ITF doubles titles and featured in her only WTA Tour main draw at the 2008 Budapest Grand Prix, partnering Nataša Zorić.

== ITF finals ==
=== Singles (0–2) ===
Outcome	No.	Date	Tournament	Surface	Opponent	Score
Runner-up	1.	28 March 2005	Patras, Greece	Hard	(Romania) Mădălina Gojnea	5–7, 2–6
Runner-up	2.	30 May 2006	Győr, Hungary	Clay	(Hungary) Virág Németh	2–6, 3–6

=== Doubles (9–10) ===
Outcome	No.	Date	Tournament	Surface	Partner	Opponents	Score
Winner	1.	27 April 2005	Herceg Novi, Serbia & Montenegro	Clay	(Romania) Raluca Olaru	(Slovenia) Aleksandra Lukič (Slovenia) Patricia Vollmeier	6–4, 4–1 ret.
Runner-up	1.	30 August 2005	Bucharest, Romania	Clay	(United Kingdom) Emily Webley-Smith	(Romania) Corina Claudia Corduneanu (Romania) Lenore Lăzăroiu	1–6, 2–6
Runner-up	2.	10 September 2005	Câmpina, Romania	Clay	(Romania) Ágnes Szatmári	(Romania) Maria Luiza Crăciun (Romania) Ioana Gașpar	7–6^{(6)}, 4–6, 4–6
Winner	2.	9 April 2006	Makarska, Croatia	Clay	(Romania) Raluca Olaru	(Sweden) Johanna Larsson (Sweden) Nadja Roma	6–4, 7–5
Winner	3.	16 April 2006	Hvar, Croatia	Clay	(Serbia and Montenegro) Karolina Jovanović	(Serbia and Montenegro) Neda Kozić (Serbia and Montenegro) Andrea Popović	6–1, 2–6, 6–0
—	—	30 April 2006	Herceg Novi, Serbia & Montenegro	Clay	(Serbia and Montenegro) Karolina Jovanović	(Germany) Katharina Killi (Serbia and Montenegro) Ana Veselinović	NP
Runner-up	3.	7 May 2006	Dubrovnik, Croatia	Clay	(Serbia and Montenegro) Karolina Jovanović	(Slovenia) Tina Obrež (Slovenia) Polona Reberšak	3–6, 4–6
Winner	4.	23 May 2006	Budapest, Hungary	Clay	(Serbia and Montenegro) Nataša Zorić	(United Kingdom) Naomi Cavaday (United Kingdom) Georgie Gent	6–1, 6–2
Winner	5.	21 August 2006	Maribor, Slovenia	Clay	(Romania) Diana Enache	(Bulgaria) Dia Evtimova (Slovenia) Maša Zec Peškirič	w/o
Runner-up	4.	4 September 2006	Bucharest, Romania	Clay	(Romania) Diana Enache	(Romania) Laura Ioana Andrei (Romania) Maria Luiza Crăciun	4–6, 6–1, 3–6
Winner	6.	25 September 2006	Szeged, Hungary	Clay	(Serbia) Nataša Zorić	(Netherlands) Talitha De Groot (Czech Republic) Lucie Makrlíková	6–3, 6–3
Winner	7.	8 October 2006	Sofia, Bulgaria	Clay	(Serbia) Andrea Popović	(Argentina) Maria-Belen Corbalan (Belgium) Davina Lobbinger	6–4, 1–6, 7–5
Winner	8.	5 February 2007	Mallorca, Spain	Clay	(Czech Republic) Simona Dobrá	(Russia) Angelina Gabueva (Germany) Tatjana Priachin	6–1, 6–2
Runner-up	5.	1 April 2007	Cairo, Egypt	Clay	(Romania) Laura Ioana Paar	(Russia) Galina Fokina (Egypt) Yasmin Hamza	0–6, 6–2, 1–6
Runner-up	6.	13 April 2007	Split, Croatia	Clay	(Romania) Mihaela Buzărnescu	(Poland) Olga Brózda (Poland) Natalia Kołat	2–6, 1–6
Runner-up	7.	4 June 2007	Pitești, Romania	Clay	(Romania) Diana Enache	(Romania) Laura-Ioana Andrei (Romania) Raluca Ciulei	2–6, 4–6
Runner-up	8.	11 June 2007	Balș, Romania	Clay	(Romania) Diana Enache	(Romania) Raluca Ciulei (Argentina) María Irigoyen	3–6, 3–6
Runner-up	9.	23 July 2007	Arad, Romania	Clay	(Romania) Diana Enache	(Spain) Melisa Cabrera Handt (Spain) Carolina Gago Fuentes	5–7, 4–6
Winner	9.	27 August 2007	Hunedoara, Romania	Clay	(Romania) Diana Enache	(Romania) Laura-Ioana Andrei (Romania) Irina-Camelia Begu	3–6, 6–4, 6–4
Runner-up	10.	25 May 2008	Galaţi, Romania	Clay	(Romania) Alexandra Cadanțu	(Slovakia) Kristína Kučová (Italy) Valentina Sulpizio	0–6, 2–6
