= Simona Matei =

Romanian tennis player

- Full name: Simona-Iulia Matei
- Country (sports): Romania
- Residence: Bucharest, Romania
- Born: 7 July 1985 (age 41) Brașov, Socialist Republic of Romania
- Height: 1.66 m (5 ft 5 1/2 in)
- Turned pro: 2002
- Retired: 2010
- Plays: Right (two-handed backhand)
- Prize money: $84,879

Singles
- Career record: 221–156
- Career titles: 9 ITF
- Highest ranking: No. 145 (2 October 2006)

Grand Slam singles results
- Australian Open: Q1 (2007)
- French Open: Q1 (2008)

Doubles
- Career record: 91–79
- Career titles: 7 ITF
- Highest ranking: No. 246 (2 October 2006)

Team competitions
- Fed Cup: 3–5

Simona-Iulia Matei (born 7 July 1985) is a former professional Romanian tennis player.

On 2 October 2006, she reached her career-high singles ranking of world No. 145 and her best WTA doubles ranking of 246. In her career, she won nine singles and seven doubles titles on the ITF Women's Circuit.

She was coached by Michele Tellini, and retired from tennis in 2010.

== ITF Circuit finals ==
Legend
$25,000 tournaments
$10,000 tournaments

=== Singles: 15 (9 titles, 6 runner-ups) ===
Result	No.	Date	Tournament	Surface	Opponent	Score
Loss	1.	Jun 2003	ITF Orestiada, Greece	Hard	(Bulgaria) Tsvetana Pironkova	1–6, 4–6
Win	2.	Jul 2003	ITF Monteroni d'Arbia, Italy	Clay	(Slovakia) Zuzana Zemenová	6–0, 7–5
Loss	3.	May 2004	ITF Bucharest, Romania	Clay	(Romania) Monica Niculescu	2–6, 2–6
Win	4.	May 2004	ITF Oradea, Romania	Clay	(Czech Republic) Petra Novotníková	6–3, 6–4
Win	5.	Jul 2004	ITF Balş, Romania	Clay	(Romania) Cătălina Cristea	6–1, 6–2
Loss	6.	Aug 2004	ITF Târgu Mureş, Romania	Clay	(Russia) Ekaterina Makarova	1–6, 1–6
Win	7.	Aug 2004	ITF Timișoara, Romania	Clay	(Israel) Yevgenia Savransky	6–3, 6–3
Win	8.	Aug 2005	ITF Bucharest, Romania	Clay	(Romania) Diana Enache	6–3, 6–0
Loss	9.	May 2006	ITF Bucharest, Romania	Clay	(Romania) Sorana Cîrstea	2–6, 6–2, 5–7
Win	10.	Jul 2006	ITF Båstad, Sweden	Clay	(Czech Republic) Sandra Záhlavová	6–4, 4–6, 7–6^{(7–0)}
Loss	11.	Sep 2006	ITF Sofia, Bulgaria	Clay	(Germany) Andrea Petkovic	5–7, 5–7
Win	12.	Sep 2006	ITF Lecce, Italy	Clay	(Italy) Giulia Gabba	6–3, 4–6, 6–3
Loss	13.	Jun 2009	ITF Bucharest, Romania	Clay	(Romania) Elena Bogdan	4–6, 3–6
Win	14.	Sep 2009	ITF Ruse, Bulgaria	Clay	(Bulgaria) Martina Gledacheva	6–2, 6–3
Win	15.	Oct 2009	ITF Dobrich, Bulgaria	Clay	(Bulgaria) Dia Evtimova	6–2, 6–3

=== Doubles: 15 (7 titles, 8 runner-ups) ===
Result	No.	Date	Tournament	Surface	Partner	Opponents	Score
Loss	1.	Aug 2004	ITF Târgu Mureş, Romania	Clay	(Hungary) Barbara Pócza	(Romania) Gabriela Niculescu (Romania) Monica Niculescu	5–7, 1–6
Loss	2.	Aug 2005	ITF Bucharest, Romania	Clay	(Romania) Liana Ungur	(Romania) Corina Corduneanu (Romania) Ágnes Szatmári	w/o
Win	3.	Oct 2005	ITF Porto, Portugal	Clay	(Lithuania) Lina Stančiūtė	(Netherlands) Kelly de Beer (Netherlands) Eva Pera	2–6, 6–4, 6–4
Win	4.	Jan 2006	ITF Grenoble, France	Hard (i)	(Turkey) Pemra Özgen	(France) Florence Haring (France) Virginie Pichet	6–3, 7–4
Win	5.	Mar 2006	ITF Parioli, Italy	Clay	(Poland) Magdalena Kiszczyńska	(Italy) Stefania Chieppa (Italy) Valentina Sulpizio	6–3, 6–2
Loss	6.	May 2006	ITF Bucharest, Romania	Clay	(Romania) Raluca Olaru	(Romania) Sorana Cîrstea (Romania) Gabriela Niculescu	4–6, 6–0, 6–7^{(3)}
Win	7.	Apr 2008	ITF Antalya, Turkey	Clay	(Italy) Valentina Sulpizio	(Russia) Eugeniya Pashkova (Russia) Avgusta Tsybysheva	6–2, 5–7, [10–4]
Loss	8.	Jun 2008	ITF Piteşti, Romania	Clay	(Italy) Valentina Sulpizio	(Romania) Laura Ioana Andrei (Romania) Mihaela Buzărnescu	5–7, 6–3, [2–10]
Loss	9.	Dec 2008	ITF Benicarló, Spain	Clay	(Romania) Cristina Mitu	(Serbia) Neda Kozić (Bulgaria) Biljana Pavlova	4–6, 6–7^{(3)}
Loss	10.	May 2009	ITF Craiova, Romania	Clay	(Serbia) Nataša Zorić	(Bulgaria) Tanya Germanlieva (Bulgaria) Dessislava Mladenova	6–4, 1–6, [7–10]
Loss	11.	Jun 2009	ITF Bucharest, Romania	Clay	(Romania) Cristina Mitu	(Romania) Laura Ioana Andrei (Romania) Ioana Gașpar	3–6, 6–7^{(3)}
Win	12.	Jul 2009	ITF Bucharest, Romania	Clay	(Romania) Ioana Gașpar	(Romania) Ionela-Andreea Iova (Romania) Cristina Mitu	7–6^{(6)}, 6–1
Win	13.	Sep 2009	ITF Ruse, Bulgaria	Clay	(Romania) Ioana Ivan	(Denmark) Malou Ejdesgaard (Bulgaria) Dia Evtimova	6–1, 6–4
Win	14.	Oct 2009	ITF Dobrich, Bulgaria	Clay	(Romania) Diana Marcu	(Turkey) Hülya Esen (Turkey) Lütfiye Esen	7–5, 4–6, [10–5]
Loss	15.	Mar 2010	ITF Antalya, Turkey	Clay	(Romania) Diana Marcu	(Slovakia) Michaela Pochabová (Slovakia) Romana Tabaková	1–6, 1–6
