= Corina Claudia Corduneanu =

Romanian tennis player

- Country (sports): Romania
- Born: 8 February 1988 (age 37); Timișoara, Romania
- Turned pro: 2002
- Retired: 2008
- Plays: Right-handed (two-handed backhand)
- Prize money: $26,452

Singles
- Career record: 91–33
- Career titles: 6 ITF
- Highest ranking: No. 305 (12 June 2006)

Doubles
- Career record: 60–20
- Career titles: 10 ITF
- Highest ranking: No. 389 (12 September 2005)

Corina Claudia Corduneanu (born 8 February 1988) is a Romanian former tennis player.

She started played tennis at the age of seven. On 12 June 2006, she reached her career-high singles ranking of world No. 305. On 12 September 2005, she peaked at No. 389 in the doubles rankings. She won six singles and ten doubles titles on the ITF Women's Circuit.

== Career ==
In July 2005, she won her first professional singles title at the $10k event in Bucharest beating compatriot Mihaela Moldovan in the final.

In June 2006 won singles title at the $25k event in Galatina beating compatriot uzbek Iroda Tulyaganova in the final. Corduneanu played on the WTA Tour in 2006 in qualifying for Palermo. She retired from professional tennis in 2008.

== ITF finals ==
$25,000 tournaments
$10,000 tournaments

=== Singles: 9 (6–3) ===
| Outcome | No. | Date | Tournament | Surface | Opponent | Score |
|---|---|---|---|---|---|---|
| Winner | 1. | 19 June 2005 | Bucharest, Romania | Clay | (Romania) Mihaela Moldovan | 6–2, 6–0 |
| Runner-up | 1. | 26 June 2005 | Bucharest, Romania | Clay | (Russia) Ekaterina Lopes | 6–4, 3–6, 5–7 |
| Winner | 2. | 3 July 2005 | Galați, Romania | Clay | (Russia) Anna Bastrikova | 6–3, 5–7, 6–4 |
| Winner | 3. | 4 September 2005 | Bucharest, Romania | Clay | (Bulgaria) Maria Penkova | 6–2, 6–3 |
| Winner | 4. | 26 March 2006 | Mansoura, Egypt | Clay | (Italy) Stella Menna | 6–1, 7–6^{(2)} |
| Runner-up | 2. | 2 April 206 | Cairo, Egypt | Clay | (Russia) Galina Fokina | 7–5, 4–6, 1–6 |
| Winner | 5. | 4 June 2006 | Galatina, Italy | Clay | (Uzbekistan) Iroda Tulyaganova | 6–3, 6–4 |
| Runner-up | 3. | 3 September 2006 | Timișoara, Romania | Clay | (Serbia and Montenegro) Andrea Popović | 2–6, 4–6 |
| Winner | 6. | 19 August 2007 | Constanța, Romania | Clay | (Romania) Alexandra Cadanţu | 6–4, 6–4 |

=== Doubles: 10 (10–0) ===
| Outcome | No. | Date | Tournament | Surface | Partner | Opponents | Score |
|---|---|---|---|---|---|---|---|
| Winner | 1. | 20 June 2004 | Brașov, Romania | Clay | (Romania) Alexandra Iacob | (Romania) Lenore Lăzăroiu (Romania) Raluca Olaru | 6–4, 7–5 |
| Winner | 2. | 3 October 2004 | Cluj-Napoca, Romania | Clay | (Romania) Raluca Olaru | (Czech Republic) Veronika Raimrová (Romania) Anamaria Sere | 4–6, 6–0, 6–4 |
| Winner | 3. | 19 June 2005 | Bucharest, Romania | Clay | (Romania) Diana Enache | (Romania) Alexandra Dulgheru (Romania) Mihaela Moldovan | 2–2 ret. |
| Winner | 4. | 26 June 2005 | Bucharest, Romania | Clay | (Romania) Gabriela Niculescu | (Russia) Ekaterina Lopes (Russia) Elena Chalova | 6–2, 6–4 |
| Winner | 5. | 3 July 2005 | Galați, Romania | Clay | (Romania) Gabriela Niculescu | (Russia) Vasilisa Davydova (Russia) Olga Panova | 6–4, 5–7, 6–1 |
| Winner | 6. | 31 July 2005 | Arad, Romania | Clay | (Romania) Raluca Olaru | (Russia) Anna Bastrikova (Russia) Vasilisa Davydova | 6–1, 6–4 |
| Winner | 7. | 7 August 2005 | Bucharest, Romania | Clay | (Romania) Raluca Olaru | (Romania) Bianca-Ioana Bonifate (Romania) Sorana Cîrstea | 6–1, 6–1 |
| Winner | 8. | 28 August 2005 | Bucharest, Romania | Clay | (Romania) Ágnes Szatmári | (Romania) Liana Ungur (Romania) Simona Matei | w/o |
| Winner | 9. | 4 September 2005 | Bucharest, Romania | Clay | (Romania) Lenore Lăzăroiu | (Romania) Antonia Xenia Tout (United Kingdom) Emily Webley-Smith | 6–1, 6–2 |
| Winner | 10. | 3 September 2006 | Timișoara, Romania | Clay | (Romania) Ioana Gașpar | (Romania) Diana Enache (Romania) Ágnes Szatmári | 6–3, 6–4 |

== Ranking history ==
| Year | Ranking Singles | Ranking Doubles |
|---|---|---|
| 2003 | – | 788 |
| 2004 | 708 | 508 |
| 2005 | 441 | 389 |
| 2006 | 305 | 404 |
| 2007 | 350 | 735 |
| 2008 | 753 | 821 |
