= 2000 Fed Cup Europe/Africa Zone Group I – Pool C =

International tennis competition

Group C of the 2000 Fed Cup Europe/Africa Zone Group I was one of four pools in the Europe/Africa Zone Group I of the 2000 Fed Cup. Four teams competed in a round robin competition, with the top team advancing to the knockout stage.

	(Belarus) BLR	(Slovenia) SLO	(Romania) ROU	(Poland) POL	(Morocco) MAR	Match; W–L	Set; W–L	Game; W–L	Standings
Belarus		2–1	3–0	3–0	3–0	4–0	23–3	147–75	1
Slovenia	1–2		3–0	3–0	2–0	3–1	19–5	140–83	2
Romania	0–3	0–3		3–0	3–0	2–2	12–13	110–109	3
Poland	0–3	0–3	0–3		3–0	1–3	7–19	95–130	4
Morocco	0–3	0–2	0–3	0–3		0–4	1–22	43–138	5

== Belarus vs. Poland ==
Belarus
3
La Manga Club, Murcia, Spain
15 May 2000
Red clay (outdoors)

Poland
0

			1	2	3
1	(Belarus) (Poland)	Nadejda Ostrovskaya; Joanna Sakowicz-Kostecka	6; 1	6; 4
2	(Belarus) (Poland)	Olga Barabanschikova; Katarzyna Strączy	6; 0	6; 3
3	(Belarus) (Poland)	Olga Barabanschikova / Tatiana Poutchek; Katarzyna Strączy / Katarzyna Teodorowicz-Lisowska	6; 1	7^{7} 6^{5}

== Slovenia vs. Romania ==
Slovenia
3
La Manga Club, Murcia, Spain
15 May 2000
Red clay (outdoors)

Romania
0

			1	2	3
1	(Slovenia) (Romania)	Tina Križan; Raluca Ciochină	7; 5	6; 3
2	(Slovenia) (Romania)	Katarina Srebotnik; Mihaela Moldovan	6; 0	6; 3
3	(Slovenia) (Romania)	Tina Križan / Katarina Srebotnik; Raluca Ciochină / Mihaela Moldovan	6; 4	7; 5

== Belarus vs. Morocco ==
Belarus
3
La Manga Club, Murcia, Spain
16 May 2000
Red clay (outdoors)

Morocco
0

			1	2	3
1	(Belarus) (Morocco)	Tatiana Poutchek; Meryem Lahlou	6; 1	6; 1
2	(Belarus) (Morocco)	Olga Barabanschikova; Meryem El Haddad	6; 1	6; 3
3	(Belarus) (Morocco)	Nadejda Ostrovskaya / Tatiana Poutchek; Meryem El Haddad / Meryem Lahlou	6; 0	6; 0

== Slovenia vs. Poland ==
Slovenia
3
La Manga Club, Murcia, Spain
16 May 2000
Red clay (outdoors)

Poland
0

			1	2	3
1	(Slovenia) (Poland)	Tina Križan; Monika Schneider	7; 5	6; 2
2	(Slovenia) (Poland)	Katarina Srebotnik; Katarzyna Strączy	6; 3	6; 2
3	(Slovenia) (Poland)	Tina Križan / Katarina Srebotnik; Joanna Sakowicz-Kostecka / Monika Schneider	6; 3	6; 1

== Belarus vs. Romania ==
Belarus
3
La Manga Club, Murcia, Spain
17 May 2000
Red clay (outdoors)

Romania
0

			1	2	3
1	(Belarus) (Romania)	Tatiana Poutchek; Raluca Ciochină	6; 2	6; 1
2	(Belarus) (Romania)	Nadejda Ostrovskaya; Mihaela Moldovan	6; 1	7; 5
3	(Belarus) (Romania)	Olga Barabanschikova / Tatiana Poutchek; Raluca Ciochină / Mihaela Moldovan	6; 2	6; 3

== Poland vs. Morocco ==
Poland
3
La Manga Club, Murcia, Spain
17 May 2000
Red clay (outdoors)

Morocco
0

			1	2	3
1	(Poland) (Morocco)	Joanna Sakowicz-Kostecka; Habiba Ifrakh	6; 1	6; 1
2	(Poland) (Morocco)	Katarzyna Strączy; Meryem El Haddad	5; 7	6; 3	6; 3
3	(Poland) (Morocco)	Joanna Sakowicz-Kostecka / Katarzyna Teodorowicz-Lisowska; Habiba Ifrakh / Meryem Lahlou	6; 1	6; 0

== Belarus vs. Slovenia ==
Belarus
2
La Manga Club, Murcia, Spain
18 May 2000
Red clay (outdoors)

Slovenia
1

			1	2	3
1	(Belarus) (Slovenia)	Nadejda Ostrovskaya; Tina Križan	6; 3	7^{11} 6^{9}
2	(Belarus) (Slovenia)	Olga Barabanschikova; Katarina Srebotnik	0; 6	6; 3	2; 6
3	(Belarus) (Slovenia)	Olga Barabanschikova / Tatiana Poutchek; Tina Križan / Katarina Srebotnik	7; 5	2; 6	7; 5

== Romania vs. Morocco ==
Romania
3
La Manga Club, Murcia, Spain
18 May 2000
Red clay (outdoors)

Morocco
0

			1	2	3
1	(Romania) (Morocco)	Raluca Ciochină; Habiba Ifrakh	6; 2	6; 1
2	(Romania) (Morocco)	Mihaela Moldovan; Meryem El Haddad	6; 4	6; 0
3	(Romania) (Morocco)	Raluca Ciochină / Mihaela Moldovan; Habiba Ifrakh / Meryem Lahlou	6; 2	6; 2

== Slovenia vs. Morocco ==
Slovenia
2
La Manga Club, Murcia, Spain
19 May 2000
Red clay (outdoors)

Morocco
0

			1	2	3
1	(Slovenia) (Morocco)	Maja Matevžič; Meryem Lahlou	6; 2	6; 1
2	(Slovenia) (Morocco)	Tina Hergold; Meryem El Haddad	7; 5	6; 2
3	(Slovenia) (Morocco)					not played

== Romania vs. Poland ==
Romania
3
La Manga Club, Murcia, Spain
19 May 2000
Red clay (outdoors)

Poland
0

			1	2	3
1	(Romania) (Poland)	Raluca Ciochină; Joanna Sakowicz-Kostecka	6; 2	6; 0
2	(Romania) (Poland)	Mihaela Moldovan; Katarzyna Strączy	6; 4	6; 4
3	(Romania) (Poland)	Adriana Burz / Raluca Ciochină; Monika Schneider / Katarzyna Teodorowicz-Lisowska	4; 6	6; 3	6; 4

- Morocco failed to win any ties in the pool, and thus was relegated to Group II in 2001, where they placed last in their pool of four.

== See also ==
- Fed Cup structure
