= Gabriela Niculescu =

Romanian tennis player

- Full name: Gabriela Niculescu
- Country (sports): Romania
- Born: 7 June 1986 (age 39); Socialist Republic of Romania
- Turned pro: 2002
- Retired: 2008
- Plays: Right Handed (Double Handed Backhand)
- Prize money: US$32,208

Singles
- Career record: 91–67
- Career titles: 0 WTA, 1 ITF
- Highest ranking: No. 376 (4 July 2005)

Doubles
- Career record: 157–43
- Career titles: 0 WTA, 25 ITF
- Highest ranking: No. 199 (20 February 2006)

Gabriela Niculescu (born 7 June 1986) is a retired professional tennis player and former member of the Romania Fed Cup team. On 4 July 2005, she reached her highest WTA singles ranking of 376; her best doubles ranking was 199 on 20 February 2006.

In 2008 playing for the University of Southern California in doubles, teamed up with American player Amanda Fink, she won the 2008 Pac-10 Doubles Championship, won the ITA West Regional doubles title, and finished the season ranked No. 4 in the nation.

She became a national platform tennis champion after retiring from professional tennis. She won titles in 2016, 2018 and 2019.

== Personal life ==
She is the older sister of tennis player Monica Niculescu.

== ITF finals ==
=== Singles (1–2) ===
Legend
$25,000 tournaments
$10,000 tournaments

Result	No.	Date	Tournament	Surface	Opponent	Score
Loss	1.	18 July 2004	Bucharest, Romania	Clay	(Czech Republic) Petra Novotníková	5–7, 6–7
Loss	2.	28 November 2004	Cairo, Egypt	Clay	(Ukraine) Yuliya Ustyuzhanina	4–6, 4–6
Win	3.	8 May 2005	Antalya, Turkey	Clay	(France) Aurélie Védy	5–7, 6–2, 6–2

=== Doubles (25-11) ===
Result	No.	Date	Tournament	Surface	Partner	Opponents	Score
Loss	1.	18 August 2002	Bucharest, Romania	Clay	(Romania) Monica Niculescu	(Bulgaria) Radoslava Topalova (Bulgaria) Virginia Trifonova	4–6, 6–3, 3–6
Win	2.	26 August 2002	Bucharest, Romania	Clay	(Romania) Monica Niculescu	(Czech Republic) Iveta Gerlová (Germany) Nina Nittinger	6–2, 6–2
Loss	3.	16 March 2003	Makarska, Croatia	Clay	(Romania) Monica Niculescu	(Austria) Stefanie Haidner (Austria) Daniela Klemenschits	6–3, 6–7^{(7)}, 4–6
Win	4.	31 March 2003	Makarska, Croatia	Clay	(Romania) Monica Niculescu	(Croatia) Darija Jurak (Slovakia) Maria Jedlicková	6–2, 6–2
Loss	5.	20 April 2003	Dubrovnik, Croatia	Clay	(Romania) Monica Niculescu	(Bosnia and Herzegovina) Mervana Jugić-Salkić (Croatia) Darija Jurak	2–6, 6–4, 2–6
Loss	6.	17 August 2003	Bucharest, Romania	Clay	(Romania) Monica Niculescu	(Russia) Anna Bastrikova (Russia) Elena Vesnina	4–6, 4–6
Loss	7.	31 August 2003	Timișoara, Romania	Clay	(Romania) Monica Niculescu	(Hungary) Julia Ács (Russia) Vasilisa Davydova	4–6, 3–6
Win	8.	23 May 2004	Bucharest, Romania	Clay	(Romania) Monica Niculescu	(Romania) Lenore Lazaroiu (Romania) Andra Savu	6–4, 6–2
Win	9.	6 June 2004	Constanța, Romania	Clay	(Romania) Mihaela Buzărnescu	(Romania) Bianca Bonifate (Romania) Diana Gae	6–4, 6–3
Win	10.	13 June 2004	Pitești, Romania	Clay	(Romania) Mihaela Buzărnescu	(Argentina) Andrea Benítez (Uruguay) Estefanía Craciún	6–4, 6–4
Win	11.	15 August 2004	Târgu Mureș, Romania	Clay	(Romania) Monica Niculescu	(Romania) Simona Matei (Hungary) Barbara Pócza	7–5, 6–1
Win	12.	22 August 2004	Iași, Romania	Clay	(Romania) Monica Niculescu	(Austria) Nadine Schlotterer (Czech Republic) Eva Valková	7–5, 6–1
Win	13.	29 August 2004	Timişoara, Romania	Clay	(Romania) Sorana Cîrstea	(Romania) Lenore Lazaroiu (Romania) Raluca Olaru	6–1, 2–6, 6–2
Win	14.	5 September 2004	Arad, Romania	Clay	(Romania) Sorana Cîrstea	(Israel) Yevgenia Savransky (Czech Republic) Sandra Záhlavová	6–2, 6–2
Loss	15.	19 September 2004	Sofia, Bulgaria	Clay	(Czech Republic) Sandra Záhlavová	(Hungary) Kyra Nagy (Hungary) Virág Németh	6–2, 2–6, 5–7
Win	16.	6 February 2005	Vale do Lobo, Portugal	Hard	(Romania) Mădălina Gojnea	(Ukraine) Irina Buryachok (Russia) Olga Panova	6–3, 6–4
Win	17.	20 March 2005	Cairo, Egypt	Clay	(Romania) Monica Niculescu	(Ukraine) Hanna Andreyeva (Ukraine) Valeria Bondarenko	6–2, 6–3
Win	18.	27 March 2005	Ain Sokhna, Egypt	Clay	(Romania) Monica Niculescu	(Romania) Laura-Ramona Husaru (Germany) Sarah Raab	6–1, 6–1
Loss	19.	17 April 2005	Civitavecchia, Italy	Clay	(Romania) Monica Niculescu	(Czech Republic) Lucie Hradecká (Czech Republic) Sandra Záhlavová	4–6, 3–6
Win	20.	8 May 2005	Antalya, Turkey	Clay	(Romania) Monica Niculescu	(Ukraine) Irina Buryachok (Russia) Olga Panova	6–3, 6–4
Win	21.	15 May 2005	Antalya, Turkey	Clay	(Romania) Monica Niculescu	(Czech Republic) Renata Kucerková (Germany) Kathrin Wörle	6–7, 6–0, 6–0
Win	22.	21 May 2005	Pitești, Romania	Clay	(Romania) Mădălina Gojnea	(Serbia and Montenegro) Vojislava Lukić (Serbia and Montenegro) Andrea Popović	6–4, 6–3
Win	23.	28 May 2005	Balș, Romania	Clay	(Romania) Bianca Bonifate	(Slovakia) Lenka Dlhopolcová (Romania) Alexandra Iacob	6–2, 7–5
Win	24.	25 June 2005	Bucharest, Romania	Clay	(Romania) Corina Corduneanu	(Russia) Elena Chalova (Russia) Ekaterina Lopes	6–2, 6–4
Win	25.	3 July 2005	Galați, Romania	Clay	(Romania) Corina Corduneanu	(Russia) Vasilisa Davydova (Russia) Olga Panova	6–4, 5–7, 6–1
Win	26.	23 July 2005	Bucharest, Romania	Clay	(Romania) Mădălina Gojnea	(Romania) Ágnes Szatmári (Ukraine) Oksana Teplyakova	6–3, 6–2
Loss	27.	23 October 2005	Sevilla, Spain	Clay	(Romania) Monica Niculescu	(Italy) Sara Errani (Spain) María José Martínez Sánchez	2–6, 6–7^{(5)}
Loss	28.	9 April 2006	Athens, Greece	Clay	(Romania) Monica Niculescu	(Poland) Olga Brózda (Estonia) Margit Rüütel	6–2, 4–6, 2–6
Win	29.	7 May 2006	Bucharest, Romania	Clay	(Romania) Sorana Cîrstea	(Romania) Simona Matei (Romania) Raluca Olaru	6–4, 0–6, 7–6^{(3)}
Win	30.	14 May 2006	Bucharest, Romania	Clay	(Romania) Monica Niculescu	(Romania) Sorana Cîrstea (Romania) Diana Buzean	6–3, 6–0
Win	31.	25 June 2006	Bucharest, Romania	Clay	(Romania) Monica Niculescu	(Romania) Raluca Ciulei (Serbia) Neda Kozić	6–2, 6–1
Win	32.	30 July 2006	Arad, Romania	Clay	(Romania) Laura Ioana Paar	(Serbia) Karolina Jovanović (Serbia) Neda Kozić	6–2, 6–3
Win	33.	6 August 2006	Bucharest, Romania	Clay	(Romania) Laura Ioana Paar	(Romania) Maria Luiza Crăciun (Romania) Ágnes Szatmári	6–3, 3–6, 6–4
Loss	34.	24 June 2007	Bucharest, Romania	Clay	(Romania) Maria Luiza Crăciun	(Ukraine) Kateryna Herth (Ukraine) Oksana Uzhylovska	5–7, 3–6
Win	35.	19 August 2007	Constanța, Romania	Clay	(Romania) Diana Gae	(Romania) Alexandra Damaschin (Romania) Lenore Lazaroiu	6–3, 6–4
Loss	36.	11 July 2008	Bucharest, Romania	Clay	(Romania) Mihaela Bunea	(Romania) Irina-Camelia Begu (Romania) Ioana Gașpar	6–4, 3–6, [3–10]
