= Natalia Kołat =

Polish tennis player

- Country (sports): Poland
- Born: 19 November 1987 (age 38) Poland
- Turned pro: 2003
- Retired: 2013
- Plays: Right-handed (two-handed backhand)
- Prize money: $41,094

Singles
- Career record: 107–96
- Career titles: 3 ITF
- Highest ranking: No. 281 (7 April 2008)

Doubles
- Career record: 143–67
- Career titles: 19 ITF
- Highest ranking: No. 135 (3 August 2009)

Natalia Kołat (Polish pronunciation: [naˈtalja ˈkɔwat]; born 19 November 1987) is a retired Polish tennis player.

Kołat won three singles and 19 doubles titles on the ITF Circuit during her career. On 7 April 2008, she reached her best singles ranking of world No. 281. On 3 August 2009, she peaked at No. 135 in the doubles rankings.

Kołat made her WTA Tour main-draw debut at the 2007 Internationaux de Strasbourg, in the doubles event partnering Émilie Bacquet.

She retired from tennis 2013.

== ITF finals ==
=== Singles (3–2) ===
| Legend $25,000 tournaments $10,000 tournaments | Finals by surface Hard (1–1) Clay (2–1) |

| Result | No. | Date | Tournament | Surface | Opponent | Score |
|---|---|---|---|---|---|---|
| Win | 1. | 30 August 2004 | ITF Warsaw, Poland | Clay | (Poland) Olga Brózda | 6–4, 4–6, 6–3 |
| Loss | 1. | 30 August 2005 | ITF Gliwice, Poland | Clay | (Hungary) Katalin Marosi | 1–6, 3–6 |
| Win | 2. | 14 May 2006 | ITF Warsaw, Poland | Clay | (Poland) Urszula Radwańska | 3–6, 7–5, 6–1 |
| Win | 3. | 15 October 2012 | ITF Akko, Israel | Hard | (Israel) Deniz Khazaniuk | 6–7^{(5)}, 6–4, 6–2 |
| Loss | 2. | 8 April 2013 | ITF Sharm El Sheikh, Egypt | Hard | (Spain) Arabela Fernandez Rabener | 4–6, 3–6 |

=== Doubles (19–11) ===
| Legend $50,000 tournaments $25,000 tournaments $10,000 tournaments | Finals by surface Hard (5–4) Clay (14–6) Carpet (0–1) |

| Result | No. | Date | Tournament | Surface | Partner | Opponents | Score |
|---|---|---|---|---|---|---|---|
| Loss | 1. | 14 May 2005 | ITF Falkenberg, Sweden | Clay | (Poland) Monika Schneider | (Sweden) Mari Andersson (Sweden) Johanna Larsson | 1–6, 1–6 |
| Win | 1. | 24 May 2005 | ITF Olecko, Poland | Clay | (Poland) Olga Brózda | (Latvia) Irina Kuzmina (Latvia) Alise Vaidere | 5–7, 6–1, 6–1 |
| Win | 2. | 7 June 2005 | ITF Warsaw, Poland | Clay | (Poland) Olga Brózda | (Ukraine) Veronika Kapshay (Russia) Elena Chalova | 6–1, 6–4 |
| Loss | 2. | 30 August 2005 | Gliwice, Poland | Clay | (Poland) Olga Brózda | (Czech Republic) Lucie Kriegsmannová (Czech Republic) Zuzana Zálabská | 5–7, 6–4, 2–6 |
| Win | 3. | 30 May 2006 | Olecko, Poland | Clay | (Poland) Olga Brózda | (Latvia) Irina Kuzmina (Latvia) Alise Vaidere | 6–2, 6–3 |
| Loss | 3. | 18 July 2006 | Zwevegem, Belgium | Clay | (Poland) Olga Brózda | (Belgium) Leslie Butkiewicz (Belgium) Caroline Maes | 2–6, 2–6 |
| Win | 4. | 8 August 2006 | Gdynia, Poland | Clay | (Poland) Olga Brózda | (Belarus) Aleksandra Malyarchikova (Ukraine) Oksana Teplyakova | 6–2, 6–1 |
| Loss | 4. | 7 November 2006 | Opole, Poland | Carpet | (Poland) Olga Brózda | (Czech Republic) Nikola Fraňková (Czech Republic) Andrea Hlaváčková | 5–7, 0–6 |
| Loss | 5. | 14 December 2006 | Valašské Meziříčí, Czech Republic | Hard | (Poland) Olga Brózda | (Czech Republic) Nikola Fraňková (Czech Republic) Andrea Hlaváčková | 1–6, 2–6 |
| Win | 5. | 10 April 2007 | Split, Croatia | Clay | (Poland) Olga Brózda | (Romania) Mihaela Buzărnescu (Romania) Antonia Xenia Tout | 6–2, 6–1 |
| Win | 6. | 19 June 2007 | Alkmaar, Netherlands | Clay | (Poland) Olga Brózda | (Netherlands) Danielle Harmsen (Netherlands) Claire Lablans | 6–3, 3–6, 6–3 |
| Loss | 6. | 14 July 2007 | Toruń, Poland | Clay | (Poland) Magdalena Kiszczyńska | (Bosnia and Herzegovina) Sandra Martinović (Switzerland) Stefanie Vögele | 6–2, 4–6, 3–6 |
| Loss | 7. | 21 August 2007 | Wahlstedt, Germany | Clay | (Austria) Stefanie Haidner | (Serbia) Neda Kozić (Germany) Antonia Matic | 1–6, 6–2, 3–6 |
| Win | 7. | 17 August 2010 | Wahlstedt, Germany | Clay | (Poland) Olga Brózda | (Netherlands) Marcella Koek (Netherlands) Bernice van de Velde | 3–6, 6–3, [10–8] |
| Win | 8. | 24 August 2010 | Enschede, Netherlands | Clay | (Poland) Olga Brózda | (Germany) Carolin Daniels (Germany) Julia Wachaczyk | 6–1, 6–3 |
| Win | 9. | 7 September 2010 | Katowice, Poland | Clay | (Poland) Olga Brózda | (Poland) Katarzyna Piter (Poland) Barbara Sobaszkiewicz | 6–3, 6–3 |
| Win | 10. | 12 October 2010 | Bol, Croatia | Clay | (Poland) Katarzyna Kawa | (Slovenia) Anja Prislan (Netherlands) Eva Wacanno | 5–7, 6–4, [10–8] |
| Loss | 8. | 26 October 2010 | Dubrovnik, Croatia | Clay | (Poland) Olga Brózda | (Romania) Diana Enache (Italy) Andreea-Roxana Vaideanu | 3–6, 2–6 |
| Loss | 9. | 24 November 2010 | Přerov, Czech Republic | Hard | (Poland) Olga Brózda | (Czech Republic) Iveta Gerlová (Czech Republic) Lucie Kriegsmannová | 1–6, 3–6 |
| Win | 11. | 17 January 2011 | Tallinn, Estonia | Hard | (Poland) Veronika Domagała | (Russia) Yanina Darishina (Russia) Polina Rodionova | 6–1, 6–0 |
| Win | 12. | 9 May 2011 | Båstad, Sweden | Clay | (Poland) Olga Brózda | (Colombia) Yuliana Lizarazo (Germany) Alina Wessel | 7–6^{(3)}, 6–2 |
| Win | 13. | 16 May 2011 | Båstad, Sweden | Clay | (Poland) Olga Brózda | (Sweden) Hilda Melander (Sweden) Paulina Milosavljevic | 6–3, 6–1 |
| Win | 14. | 15 June 2011 | Alkmaar, Netherlands | Clay | (Poland) Olga Brózda | (Malta) Kimberley Cassar (Bulgaria) Isabella Shinikova | 6–7^{(6)}, 6–2, [10–2] |
| Win | 15. | 26 July 2011 | Palić, Serbia | Clay | (Poland) Olga Brózda | (Romania) Karina Goia (Bulgaria) Dalia Zafirova | 6–2, 6–3 |
| Loss | 10. | 12 September 2011 | Porto Rafti, Greece | Hard | (Poland) Veronika Domagała | (Poland) Natalia Siedliska (Poland) Sylwia Zagórska | 4–6, 0–6 |
| Loss | 11. | 5 June 2012 | Amarante, Portugal | Hard | (Poland) Olga Brózda | (Mexico) Ivette López (Spain) Nuria Párrizas Díaz | w/o |
| Win | 16. | 15 October 2012 | Akko, Israel | Hard | (Poland) Olga Brózda | (Czech Republic) Nikola Fraňková (Russia) Ekaterina Yashina | 6–2, 6–4 |
| Win | 17. | 22 October 2012 | ITF Ashkelon, Israel | Hard | (Poland) Olga Brózda | (Czech Republic) Nikola Fraňková (Russia) Ekaterina Yashina | 7–6^{(11)}, 6–1 |
| Win | 18. | 30 January 2013 | ITF Sharm El Sheikh, Egypt | Hard | (Poland) Katarzyna Kawa | (Bulgaria) Aleksandrina Naydenova (Russia) Ekaterina Yashina | 6–1, 6–4 |
| Win | 19. | 17 April 2013 | ITF Sharm El Sheikh, Egypt | Hard | (Poland) Olga Brózda | (Russia) Olga Doroshina (Brazil) Laura Pigossi | 6–3, 6–1 |
