= Diana Enache =

Romanian tennis player

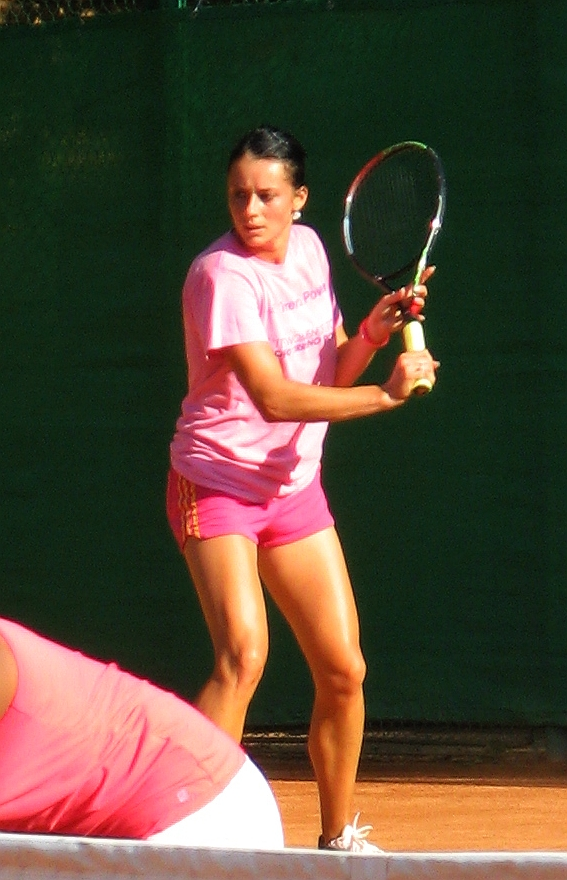
- Enache at the 2011 Open Romania Ladies
- Country (sports): Romania
- Born: 12 December 1987 (age 38) Pitești, Romania
- Prize money: $125,963

Singles
- Career record: 387–197
- Career titles: 13 ITF
- Highest ranking: No. 343 (11 April 2011)

Doubles
- Career record: 361–161
- Career titles: 49 ITF
- Highest ranking: No. 213 (2 November 2015)

Diana Enache (born 12 December 1987; formerly known as Diana Buzean) is a Romanian former tennis player.

== Career overview ==
In her career, she won 13 singles and 49 doubles titles on the ITF Women's Circuit. On 11 April 2011, she reached her best singles ranking of world No. 343. On 2 November 2015, she peaked at No. 213 in the doubles rankings.

Enache made her WTA Tour debut at the 2015 BRD Bucharest Open, partnering with Chantal Škamlová in the doubles draw where they lost their first-round match against Çağla Büyükakçay and Viktorija Golubic.

== Personal life ==
In June 2012, Diana married footballer Ionuț Buzean.

In September 2016, she reverted to being called Enache.

== ITF Circuit finals ==
=== Singles: 31 (13 titles, 18 runner-ups) ===
Legend $100,000 tournaments $75,000 tournaments $50,000 tournaments $25,000 tournaments $10,000 tournaments	Finals by surface Hard (0–0) Clay (13–18)

Result	No.	Date	Tournament	Surface	Opponent	Score
Loss	1.	22 August 2005	ITF Bucharest, Romania	Clay	(Romania) Simona Matei	3–6, 0–6
Loss	2.	22 May 2006	ITF Balș, Romania	Clay	(Austria) Melanie Klaffner	3–6, 4–6
Win	1.	31 July 2006	ITF Bucharest	Clay	(Serbia and Montenegro) Neda Kozić	6–3, 2–6, 6–4
Loss	3.	11 June 2007	ITF Balș	Clay	(Russia) Natalia Orlova	6–2, 1–6, 5–7
Loss	4.	5 November 2007	ITF Mallorca, Spain	Clay	(Israel) Julia Glushko	0–6, 0–6
Loss	5.	12 November 2007	ITF Mallorca	Clay	(Poland) Sylwia Zagórska	1–6, 6–7^{(2)}
Win	2.	21 July 2008	ITF Hunedoara, Romania	Clay	(Australia) Marija Mirkovic	6–2, 4–6, 6–1
Loss	6.	25 August 2008	ITF Bucharest	Clay	(Switzerland) Conny Perrin	3–6, 2–6
Loss	7.	1 September 2008	ITF Brașov, Romania	Clay	(Romania) Irina-Camelia Begu	6–4, 4–6, 1–6
Loss	8.	3 August 2009	ITF Arad, Romania	Clay	(Croatia) Ani Mijačika	1–6, 2–6
Loss	9.	14 September 2009	ITF Lleida, Spain	Clay	(Spain) Lara Arruabarrena	3–6, 7–5, 2–6
Loss	10.	17 May 2010	ITF Bucharest	Clay	(Romania) Alexandra Cadanțu	2–6, 4–6
Loss	11.	27 September 2010	ITF Ciampino, Italy	Clay	(Italy) Martina Caregaro	3–6, 3–6
Win	3.	18 October 2010	ITF Dubrovnik, Croatia	Clay	(Italy) Vivienne Vierin	6–3, 7–5
Win	4.	15 November 2010	ITF Mallorca	Clay	(Italy) Karin Knapp	6–4, 6–2
Loss	12.	28 February 2011	ITF Antalya, Turkey	Clay	(Romania) Cristina Dinu	2–6, 3–6
Win	5.	11 July 2011	ITF Iași, Romania	Clay	(Netherlands) Daniëlle Harmsen	7–6^{(9)}, 6–2
Win	6.	15 August 2011	ITF Arad, Romania	Clay	(Romania) Raluca Elena Platon	6–1, 1–0 ret.
Win	7.	17 October 2011	ITF Antalya	Clay	(Germany) Anna-Lena Friedsam	6–4, 6–2
Win	8.	24 October 2011	ITF Antalya	Clay	(Belgium) Maryna Zanevska	6–1, 6–7^{(5)}, 6–4
Loss	13.	6 February 2012	ITF Antalya	Clay	(Romania) Cristina Dinu	1–6, 1–6
Loss	14.	22 October 2012	ITF Antalya	Clay	(Ukraine) Olga Ianchuk	6–3, 4–6, 4–6
Loss	15.	18 November 2013	ITF Antalya	Clay	(Georgia (country)) Ekaterine Gorgodze	6–4, 1–6, 4–6
Win	9.	5 May 2014	ITF Pula, Italy	Clay	(Canada) Gloria Liang	6–2, 6–7^{(7)}, 6–0
Loss	16.	4 August 2014	ITF Arad	Clay	(Romania) Nicoleta Dascălu	3–6, 3–6
Win	10.	20 October 2014	ITF Pula	Clay	(Italy) Martina Spigarelli	6–2, 6–4
Loss	17.	16 February 2015	ITF Antalya	Clay	(Georgia (country)) Sofia Kvatsabaia	4–6, 6–7^{(6)}
Win	11.	23 February 2015	ITF Antalya	Clay	(Turkey) Berfu Cengiz	4–6, 6–4, 6–0
Win	12.	1 June 2015	ITF Galați, Romania	Clay	(Romania) Irina Bara	6–3, 4–6, 6–3
Win	13.	17 August 2015	ITF Bucharest	Clay	(Romania) Cristina Ene	6–3, 4–6, 6–1
Loss	18.	31 October 2016	ITF Hammamet, Tunisia	Clay	(Switzerland) Jil Teichmann	4–6, 4–6

=== Doubles: 80 (49 titles, 31 runner-ups) ===
Legend $75,000 tournaments $50,000 tournaments $25,000 tournaments $15,000 tournaments $10,000 tournaments	Finals by surface Hard (1–2) Clay (48–29)

Outcome	No.	Date	Location	Surface	Partner	Opponents	Score
Winner	1.	13 June 2005	Bucharest, Romania	Clay	(Romania) Corina Corduneanu	(Romania) Alexandra Dulgheru (Romania) Mihaela Moldovan	2–2 ret.
Runner-up	1.	8 May 2006	Bucharest	Clay	(Romania) Sorana Cîrstea	(Romania) Gabriela Niculescu (Romania) Monica Niculescu	3–6, 0–6
Runner-up	2.	12 June 2006	Mediaș, Romania	Clay	(Romania) Raluca Ciulei	(Romania) Laura Ioana Andrei (Romania) Andrada Dinu	5–7, 5–7
Runner-up	3.	14 August 2006	Bratislava, Slovakia	Clay	(Germany) Maren Kassens	(Slovakia) Eva Fislová (Slovakia) Stanislava Hrozenská	2–6, 2–6
Winner	2.	21 August 2006	Maribor, Slovenia	Clay	(Romania) Antonia Xenia Tout	(Bulgaria) Dia Evtimova (Slovenia) Maša Zec Peškirič	w/o
Runner-up	4.	28 August 2006	Timișoara, Romania	Clay	(Romania) Ágnes Szatmári	(Romania) Corina Corduneanu (Romania) Ioana Gaspar	3–6, 4–6
Runner-up	5.	4 September 2006	ITF Bucharest	Clay	(Romania) Antonia Xenia Tout	(Romania) Laura Ioana Andrei (Romania) Maria Luiza Crăciun	4–6, 6–1, 3–6
Runner-up	6.	4 June 2007	Pitești, Romania	Clay	(Romania) Antonia Xenia Tout	(Romania) Laura Ioana Andrei (Romania) Raluca Ciulei	2–6, 4–6
Runner-up	7.	11 June 2007	Balș, Romania	Clay	(Romania) Antonia Xenia Tout	(Romania) Raluca Ciulei (Argentina) María Irigoyen	3–6, 3–6
Runner-up	8.	23 July 2007	Arad, Romania	Clay	(Romania) Antonia Xenia Tout	(Spain) Melisa Cabrera Handt (Spain) Carolina Gago Fuentes	5–7, 4–6
Winner	3.	27 August 2007	Hunedoara, Romania	Clay	(Romania) Antonia Xenia Tout	(Romania) Laura Ioana Andrei (Romania) Irina-Camelia Begu	3–6, 6–4, 6–4
Winner	4.	9 June 2008	Craiova, Romania	Clay	(Romania) Laura Ioana Andrei	(Romania) Irina-Camelia Begu (Romania) Alexandra Damaschin	6–3, 6–1
Runner-up	9.	14 July 2008	Balș, Romania	Clay	(Romania) Laura Ioana Andrei	(Romania) Camelia Hristea (Romania) Ionela-Andreea Iova	6–2, 4–6, [8–10]
Winner	5.	28 July 2008	Arad, Romania	Clay	(Romania) Laura Ioana Andrei	(Romania) Elora Dabija (Romania) Andreea Mitu	3–6, 6–2, [10–6]
Winner	6.	20 October 2008	Sant Cugat del Vallès, Spain	Clay	(Poland) Olga Brózda	(Spain) Melisa Cabrera Handt (Spain) Lucía Sainz	6–7^{(4)}, 7–6^{(3)}, [10–7]
Runner-up	10.	25 May 2009	Pitești, Romania	Clay	(Romania) Andreea Mitu	(Romania) Alexandra Damaschin (Romania) Camelia Hristea	1–6, 4–6
Winner	7.	27 July 2009	Onești, Romania	Clay	(Romania) Alexandra Damaschin	(Romania) Camelia Hristea (Romania) Veronica Popovici	6–2, 6–1
Winner	8.	3 August 2009	Arad, Romania	Clay	(Romania) Andreea Mitu	(Romania) Ionela-Andreea Iova (Romania) Ioana Ivan	6–3, 7–5
Winner	9.	19 October 2009	Thessaloniki, Greece	Clay	(Romania) Camelia Hristea	(Poland) Olga Brózda (Poland) Justyna Jegiołka	5–7, 6–4, [11–9]
Runner-up	11.	7 December 2009	Benicarló, Spain	Clay	(Romania) Alexandra Cadanțu	(Italy) Romina Oprandi (Spain) Laura Pous Tió	4–6, 3–6
Winner	10.	8 March 2010	Antalya, Turkey	Clay	(Romania) Andreea Mitu	(Italy) Evelyn Mayr (Italy) Julia Mayr	6–7^{(3)}, 6–1, [11–9]
Runner-up	12.	17 May 2010	Bucharest, Romania	Clay	(Romania) Andreea Mitu	(Romania) Laura Ioana Andrei (Romania) Mădălina Gojnea	4–6, 6–3, [7–10]
Winner	11.	19 July 2010	Bucharest, Romania	Clay	(Romania) Andreea Mitu	(Bulgaria) Dessislava Mladenova (Bulgaria) Dalia Zafirova	6–3, 6–1
Runner-up	13.	16 August 2010	Bucharest, Romania	Clay	(Romania) Camelia Hristea	(Romania) Laura Ioana Andrei (Romania) Mihaela Buzărnescu	1–6, 3–6
Winner	12.	23 August 2010	Wanfercée-Baulet, Belgium	Clay	(France) Alizé Lim	(Belgium) Gally De Wael (Morocco) Fatima El Allami	6–0, 6–3
Winner	13.	27 September 2010	Ciampino, Italy	Clay	(Italy) Valentina Sulpizio	(Italy) Stefania Chieppa (Bulgaria) Martina Gledacheva	6–4, 6–4
Winner	14.	25 October 2010	Dubrovnik, Croatia	Clay	(Italy) Andreea Văideanu	(Poland) Olga Brózda (Poland) Natalia Kołat	6–3, 6–2
Winner	15.	15 November 2010	Mallorca, Spain	Clay	(Romania) Raluca Elena Platon	(Portugal) Maria João Koehler (Russia) Avgusta Tsybysheva	6–3, 7–6^{(3)}
Winner	16.	11 April 2011	Pomezia, Italy	Clay	(Italy) Karin Knapp	(Switzerland) Conny Perrin (Russia) Marina Shamayko	7–6^{(3)}, 6–2
Runner-up	14.	18 April 2011	Civitavecchia, Italy	Clay	(Romania) Liana Ungur	(Netherlands) Daniëlle Harmsen (Hungary) Réka Luca Jani	2–6, 3–6
Winner	17.	27 June 2011	Ystad, Sweden	Clay	(Romania) Alexandra Cadanțu	(Bosnia and Herzegovina) Mervana Jugić-Salkić (Finland) Emma Laine	6–4, 2–6, [10–5]
Winner	18.	4 July 2011	Craiova, Romania	Clay	(Netherlands) Daniëlle Harmsen	(Romania) Elena Bogdan (Romania) Mihaela Buzărnescu	4–6, 7–6^{(5)}, [10–6]
Winner	19.	11 July 2011	Iași, Romania	Clay	(Netherlands) Daniëlle Harmsen	(Romania) Ionela-Andreea Iova (Italy) Andreea Văideanu	6–4, 6–1
Winner	20.	15 August 2011	Arad, Romania	Clay	(Italy) Andreea Văideanu	(Romania) Bianca Hîncu (Romania) Diana Marcu	6–3, 6–7^{(4)}, [16–14]
Winner	21.	5 September 2011	Alphen aan den Rijn, Netherlands	Clay	(Netherlands) Daniëlle Harmsen	(Poland) Katarzyna Piter (Poland) Barbara Sobaszkiewicz	6–2, 6–7^{(4)}, [11–9]
Runner-up	15.	17 October 2011	Antalya, Turkey	Clay	(Netherlands) Daniëlle Harmsen	(Georgia (country)) Sofia Kvatsabaia (Ukraine) Maryna Zanevska	4–6, 1–6
Winner	22.	24 October 2011	Antalya, Turkey	Clay	(Netherlands) Daniëlle Harmsen	(Romania) Laura Ioana Andrei (Romania) Camelia Hristea	6–0, 6–3
Winner	23.	21 November 2011	Antalya, Turkey	Clay	(Netherlands) Daniëlle Harmsen	(Slovenia) Dalila Jakupović (Germany) Sarah-Rebecca Sekulic	6–1, 6–3
Winner	24.	28 November 2011	Antalya, Turkey	Clay	(Netherlands) Daniëlle Harmsen	(Romania) Elena-Teodora Cadar (Romania) Ioana Loredana Roșca	7–5, 6–2
Winner	25.	30 January 2012	Antalya, Turkey	Clay	(Netherlands) Daniëlle Harmsen	(Belarus) Ilona Kremen (Japan) Emi Mutaguchi	6–0, 1–6, [10–6]
Winner	26.	6 February 2012	Antalya, Turkey	Clay	(Netherlands) Daniëlle Harmsen	(Turkey) Seda Arantekin (Turkey) Hülya Esen	7–6^{(5)}, 6–1
Winner	27.	5 March 2012	Antalya, Turkey	Clay	(Romania) Cristina Dinu	(Russia) Angelina Gabueva (Russia) Margarita Lazareva	6–0, 5–7, [10–3]
Runner-up	16.	2 July 2012	Rovereto, Italy	Clay	(Netherlands) Daniëlle Harmsen	(France) Estelle Guisard (Italy) Julia Mayr	3–6, 3–6
Winner	28.	30 July 2012	Rebecq, Belgium	Clay	(Netherlands) Daniëlle Harmsen	(Netherlands) Lesley Kerkhove (Russia) Marina Melnikova	6–4, 6–2
Winner	29.	6 August 2012	Koksijde, Belgium	Clay	(Netherlands) Daniëlle Harmsen	(France) Myrtille Georges (France) Céline Ghesquière	3–6, 6–3, [10–5]
Winner	30.	3 September 2012	Alphen aan den Rijn, Netherlands	Clay	(Netherlands) Daniëlle Harmsen	(Italy) Corinna Dentoni (Germany) Justine Ozga	6–2, 6–0
Runner-up	17.	24 September 2012	Antalya, Turkey	Clay	(Romania) Bianca Hîncu	(France) Anaïs Laurendon (Czech Republic) Kateřina Vaňková	5–7, 3–6
Winner	31.	29 October 2012	Antalya, Turkey	Clay	(Netherlands) Daniëlle Harmsen	(Turkey) Hülya Esen (Turkey) Lütfiye Esen	4–6, 6–1, [10–3]
Runner-up	18.	5 November 2012	Antalya, Turkey	Clay	(Netherlands) Daniëlle Harmsen	(Hungary) Ágnes Bukta (Czech Republic) Petra Krejsová	w/o
Winner	32.	8 April 2013	Antalya, Turkey	Hard	(Romania) Irina Bara	(Brazil) Beatriz Haddad Maia (Portugal) Bárbara Luz	7–5, 6–1
Runner-up	19.	15 April 2013	Antalya, Turkey	Hard	(Romania) Irina Bara	(Argentina) Andrea Benítez (Brazil) Carla Forte	2–6, 4–6
Winner	33.	8 July 2013	Iași, Romania	Clay	(Romania) Irina Bara	(Bosnia and Herzegovina) Anita Husarić (Ukraine) Kateryna Sliusar	6–2, 6–1
Winner	34.	5 August 2013	Arad, Romania	Clay	(Romania) Irina Bara	(Romania) Cristina Adamescu (Romania) Ana Bianca Mihaila	6–4, 6–3
Runner-up	20.	12 August 2013	Craiova, Romania	Clay	(Germany) Christina Shakovets	(Italy) Alice Balducci (Poland) Katarzyna Kawa	6–3, 6–7^{(3)}, [8–10]
Runner-up	21.	26 August 2013	Mamaia, Romania	Clay	(Spain) Inés Ferrer Suárez	(Kazakhstan) Kamila Kerimbayeva (Germany) Christina Shakovets	3–6, 5–7
Winner	35.	28 October 2013	Antalya, Turkey	Clay	(Romania) Raluca Elena Platon	(Georgia (country)) Ekaterine Gorgodze (Austria) Pia König	3–6, 6–3, [10–5]
Winner	36.	4 November 2013	Antalya, Turkey	Clay	(Romania) Raluca Elena Platon	(North Macedonia) Lina Gjorcheska (Czech Republic) Martina Kubičíková	7–5, 6–1
Runner-up	22.	11 November 2013	Antalya, Turkey	Clay	(Romania) Raluca Elena Platon	(North Macedonia) Lina Gjorcheska (Moldova) Anastasia Vdovenco	3–6, 2–6
Winner	37.	9 December 2013	Antalya, Turkey	Clay	(Romania) Raluca Elena Platon	(Japan) Michika Ozeki (Japan) Hikari Yamamoto	7–5, 6–1
Runner-up	23.	27 January 2014	Antalya, Turkey	Clay	(Romania) Irina Bara	(Belarus) Sviatlana Pirazhenka (Ukraine) Alyona Sotnikova	5–7, 6–1, [7–10]
Winner	38.	31 March 2014	Pula, Italy	Clay	(Italy) Alice Balducci	(Argentina) Tatiana Búa (Spain) Inés Ferrer Suárez	3–6, 6–1, [10–1]
Runner-up	24.	7 April 2014	Pula, Italy	Clay	(Italy) Alice Balducci	(Japan) Mana Ayukawa (Latvia) Jeļena Ostapenko	5–7, 6–3, [5–10]
Winner	39.	28 April 2014	Pula, Italy	Clay	(Italy) Claudia Giovine	(Italy) Martina Caregaro (Italy) Anna Floris	6–2, 6–4
Runner-up	25.	30 June 2014	Brussels, Belgium	Clay	(Russia) Natela Dzalamidze	(Italy) Alice Matteucci (Italy) Camilla Rosatello	4–6, 6–3, [3–10]
Winner	40.	28 July 2014	Bad Saulgau, Germany	Clay	(Spain) Arabela Fernández Rabener	(Sweden) Rebecca Peterson (Sweden) Hilda Melander	7–5, 6–3
Winner	41.	4 August 2014	Arad, Romania	Clay	(Romania) Irina Bara	(North Macedonia) Lina Gjorcheska (Romania) Camelia Hristea	4–6, 7–5, [10–6]
Runner-up	26.	1 September 2014	Galați, Romania	Clay	(Spain) Arabela Fernández Rabener	(Romania) Oana Georgeta Simion (Romania) Ágnes Szatmári	6–4, 4–6, [8–10]
Runner-up	27.	22 September 2014	Varna, Bulgaria	Clay	(Romania) Raluca Elena Platon	(Bulgaria) Isabella Shinikova (Bulgaria) Julia Terziyska	5–7, 1–6
Winner	42.	29 September 2014	Albena, Bulgaria	Clay	(Romania) Raluca Elena Platon	(Ukraine) Helen Ploskina (Moldova) Anastasia Vdovenco	6–2, 6–2
Runner-up	28.	13 October 2014	Pula, Italy	Clay	(Romania) Raluca Elena Platon	(Germany) Anna Klasen (Germany) Charlotte Klasen	2–6, 3–6
Winner	43.	20 October 2014	Pula, Italy	Clay	(Romania) Raluca Elena Platon	(Netherlands) Inger van Dijkman (Netherlands) Janneke Wikkerink	6–2, 7–5
Winner	44.	8 December 2014	Antalya, Turkey	Clay	(Romania) Irina Bara	(North Macedonia) Magdalena Stoilkovska (Netherlands) Elke Tiel	6–2, 6–4
Runner-up	29.	16 March 2015	Port El Kantaoui, Tunisia	Hard	(Romania) Raluca Ciufrila	(Netherlands) Inger van Dijkman (Belgium) Britt Geukens	2–6, 0–6
Winner	45.	6 April 2015	Chiasso, Switzerland	Clay	(Hungary) Réka Luca Jani	(Italy) Giulia Gatto-Monticone (Italy) Alice Matteucci	6–2, 7–5
Runner-up	30.	27 April 2015	Pula, Italy	Clay	(Italy) Alice Matteucci	(Slovenia) Nastja Kolar (Greece) Despina Papamichail	1–6, 6–1, [8–10]
Runner-up	31.	8 June 2015	Galați, Romania	Clay	(Romania) Irina Bara	(Romania) Cristina Dinu (North Macedonia) Lina Gjorcheska	4–6, 2–6
Winner	46.	3 August 2015	Bad Saulgau, Germany	Clay	(Romania) Cristina Dinu	(Greece) Despina Papamichail (Greece) Maria Sakkari	2–6, 6–3, [10–8]
Winner	47.	17 August 2015	Bucharest, Romania	Clay	(Romania) Cristina Dinu	(Romania) Elena Ruse (Romania) Oana Georgeta Simion	6–0, 6–2
Winner	48.	17 October 2016	Antalya, Turkey	Clay	(Hungary) Ágnes Bukta	(Russia) Ulyana Ayzatulina (Ukraine) Anastasiya Poplavska	6–4, 6–1
Winner	49.	7 November 2016	Hammamet, Tunisia	Clay	(Romania) Ilona Georgiana Ghioroaie	(Brazil) Carolina Alves (Bolivia) Noelia Zeballos	3–6, 6–1, [10–8]
