= Dessislava Mladenova =

Bulgarian tennis player

Dessislava Mladenova Десислава Младенова
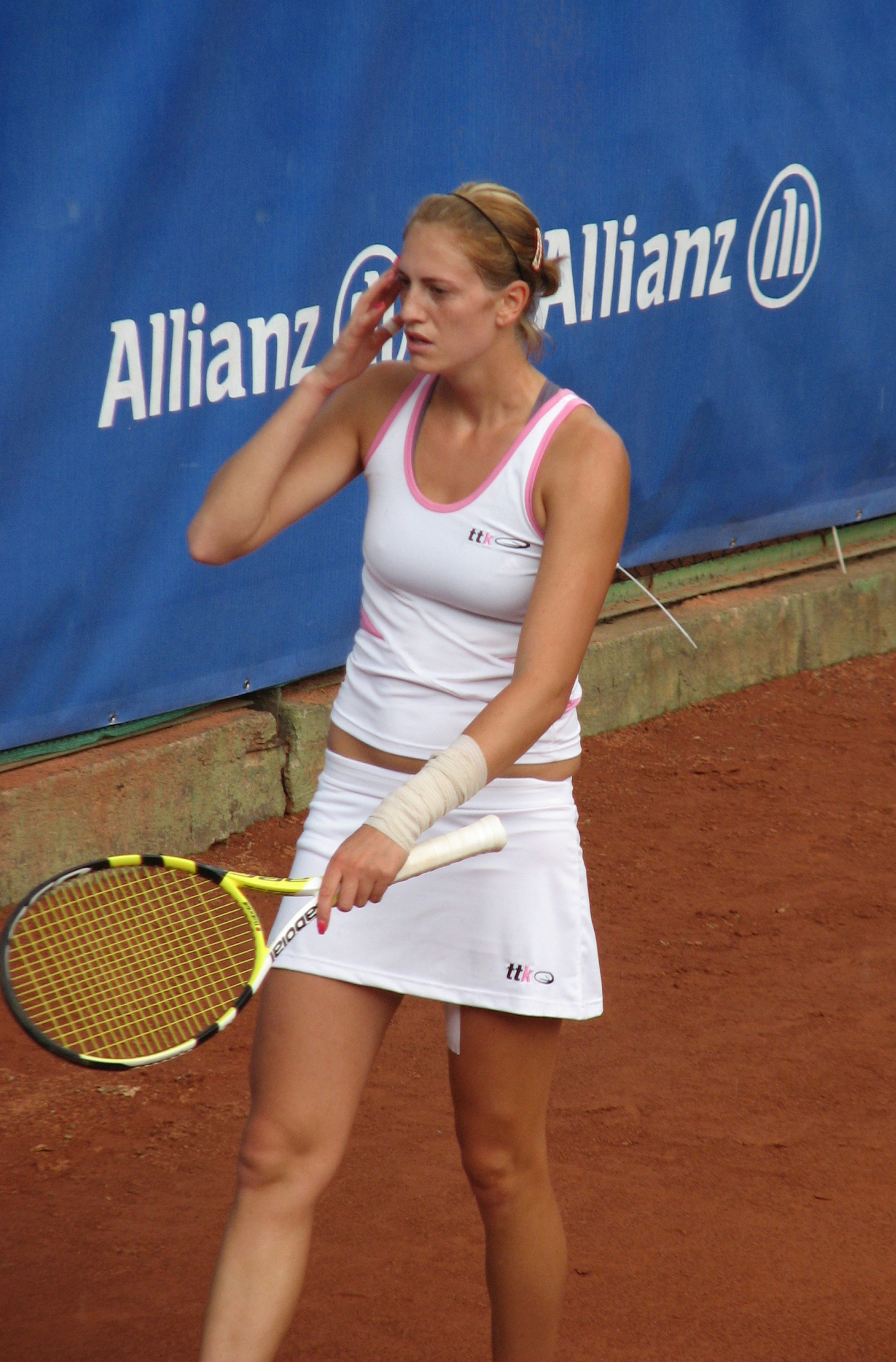
- Dessislava Mladenova at the 2008 Allianz Cup
- Country (sports): Bulgaria
- Residence: Sofia, Bulgaria
- Born: 21 June 1988 (age 36); Sofia, Bulgaria
- Height: 1.79 m (5 ft 10 in)
- Turned pro: 2004
- Retired: 2011
- Plays: Left-handed (two-handed both sides)
- Prize money: US$ 19,354

Singles
- Career record: 52–79
- Career titles: 0 WTA, 0 ITF
- Highest ranking: No. 684 (6 October 2008)

Doubles
- Career record: 64–54
- Career titles: 0 WTA, 3 ITF
- Highest ranking: No. 388 (5 May 2008)

Team competitions
- Fed Cup: 1–2 (doubles 1-2)

Dessislava Svetoslavova Mladenova (Bulgarian: Десислава Светославова Младенова, born 21 June 1988) is a Bulgarian former professional tennis player.

On 6 October 2008, she reached her highest WTA singles ranking of No. 684, whilst her best doubles ranking was 388 on 5 May 2008. IN her career, she won three doubles titles on the ITF Circuit.

== ITF Circuit finals ==
=== Singles: 1 (1 runner–up) ===
Legend $100,000 tournaments $75,000 tournaments $50,000 tournaments $25,000 tournaments $10,000 tournaments	Finals by surface Hard (0–1) Clay (0–0) Grass (0–0) Carpet (0–0)

Result	W–L	Date	Tournament	Tier	Surface	Opponent	Score
Loss	0–1	Feb 2008	ITF Melilla, Spain	10,000	Hard	(Ukraine) Tetyana Arefyeva	1–6, 6–7^{(1–7)}

=== Doubles 10 (3 titles, 7 runner–ups) ===
Legend $100,000 tournaments $75,000 tournaments $50,000 tournaments $25,000 tournaments $10,000 tournaments	Finals by surface Hard (2–2) Clay (1–5) Grass (0–0) Carpet (0–1)

Result	W–L	Date	Tournament	Tier	Surface	Partner	Opponents	Score
Win	1–0	May 2007	ITF Antalya, Turkey	25,000	Hard	(Serbia) Vojislava Lukić	(Georgia (country)) Oksana Kalashnikova (Georgia (country)) Sofia Kvatsabaia	2–6, 6–2, 6–3
Loss	1–1	Jun 2008	ITF Istanbul, Turkey	10,000	Hard	(Turkey) Pemra Özgen	(Israel) Chen Astrogo (Belarus) Volha Duko	5–7, 6–1, [5–10]
Loss	1–2	Sep 2008	ITF Sofia, Bulgaria	10,000	Clay	(France) Émilie Bacquet	(Ukraine) Mariya Malkhasyan (Ukraine) Oksana Pavlova	2–6, 1–6
Loss	1–3	May 2009	ITF Bucharest, Romania	10,000	Clay	(Bulgaria) Dalia Zafirova	(Romania) Laura Ioana Paar (Romania) Diana-Andreea Gae	1–6, 7–5, [12–14]
Win	2–3	May 2009	ITF Craiova, Romania	10,000	Clay	(Bulgaria) Tanya Germanlieva	(Romania) Simona Matei (Serbia) Nataša Zorić	4–6, 6–1, [10–7]
Loss	2–4	Nov 2009	ITF Volos, Greece	10,000	Carpet	(Bulgaria) Tanya Germanlieva	(Poland) Olga Brózda (Poland) Justyna Jegiołka	6–4, 4–6, [7–10]
Loss	2–5	May 2010	ITF Craiova, Romania	10,000	Clay	(Bulgaria) Tanya Germanlieva	(Romania) Alexandra Cadanțu (Romania) Alexandra Damaschin	3–6, 3–6
Loss	2–6	Jul 2010	ITF Bucharest, Romania	10,000	Clay	(Bulgaria) Dalia Zafirova	(Romania) Diana Enache (Romania) Andreea Mitu	3–6, 1–6
Loss	2–7	May 2011	ITF Istanbul, Turkey	10,000	Hard	(Slovenia) Anja Prislan	(Romania) Laura Ioana Paar (Georgia (country)) Sofia Kvatsabaia	2–6, 2–6
Win	3–7	May 2011	ITF Istanbul, Turkey	10,000	Hard	(Italy) Andreea Vaideanu	(Ukraine) Ganna Piven (Ukraine) Anastasiya Vasylyeva	4–6, 6–1, [10–5]

== Fed Cup ==
Dessislava Mladenova debuted for the Bulgaria Fed Cup team in 2007. Since then, she has a 1–2 doubles record (1–2 overall).

=== Doubles: 3 (1–2) ===
Edition	Round	Date	Partner	Against	Surface	Opponents	W/L	Result
2007 Europe/Africa Group I	RR	18 April 2007	Jaklin Alawi	Great Britain	Clay	(United Kingdom) Elena Baltacha (United Kingdom) Claire Curran	L	4–6, 2–6
2007 Europe/Africa Group I	RR	19 April 2007	Jaklin Alawi	Poland	Clay	(Poland) Marta Domachowska (Poland) Klaudia Jans-Ignacik	L	0–6, 3–6
2007 Europe/Africa Group I	RR	20 April 2007	Dia Evtimova	Luxembourg	Clay	(Luxembourg) Mandy Minella (Luxembourg) Lynn Philippe	W	3–6, 7–6^{(7–3)}, 0–1 ret.
