= Barbara Pócza =

Hungarian tennis player

- Country (sports): Hungary
- Born: 6 April 1986 (age 39) Győr, Hungary
- Height: 5 ft 8 in (1.73 m)
- Plays: Right-handed
- Prize money: $16,228

Singles
- Career titles: 0 WTA / 2 ITF
- Highest ranking: No. 422 (13 September 2004)

Doubles
- Career titles: 0 WTA / 2 ITF
- Highest ranking: No. 467 (30 August 2004)

Barbara Pócza (born 6 April 1986) is a Hungarian former professional tennis player.

== Biography ==
A right-handed player from Győr, Pócza was ranked as high as 63 in the world as a junior.

Pócza won two professional titles on the ITF circuit, at Carcavelos in 2003 and Dubrovnik in 2004.

In 2005 she featured in two Federation Cup ties for Hungary. She played a doubles rubber against Estonia, which she and partner Ágnes Szávay won, then appeared against Luxembourg in a singles match, losing to Mandy Minella.

Pócza finished up on the professional tour in 2005 and later played college tennis in the United States for Barry University. She helped Barry University claim the NCAA Women's Division II Tennis Championship title as a senior in 2011.

== ITF finals ==
=== Singles (2–2) ===
Outcome	No.	Date	Tournament	Surface	Opponent	Score
Runner-up	1.	21 September 2003	Sidi Fredj, Algeria	Clay	(Germany) Isabel Collischonn	1–6, 2–6
Winner	1.	12 October 2003	Carcavelos, Portugal	Clay	(Bulgaria) Sesil Karatantcheva	6–2, 6–0
Runner-up	2.	5 September 2004	Arad, Romania	Clay	(Romania) Liana Ungur	5–7, 5–7
Winner	2.	17 October 2004	Dubrovnik, Croatia	Clay	(Croatia) Sanja Ančić	6–4, 6–0

=== Doubles (2–4) ===
Outcome	No.	Date	Tournament	Surface	Partner	Opponents	Score
Runner-up	1.	13 October 2002	Haifa, Israel	Hard	(Hungary) Zsuzsanna Babos	(Netherlands) Leonie Muller van Moppe (Thailand) Suchanun Viratprasert	3–6, 3–6
Winner	1.	1 September 2003	Ben Aknoun, Algeria	Clay	(Hungary) Petra Teller	(Denmark) Karina Jacobsgaard (Norway) Ina Sartz	3–6, 6–4, 6–4
Winner	2.	14 September 2003	Tlemcen, Algeria	Clay	(Hungary) Petra Teller	(India) Liza Pereira Viplav (Austria) Jennifer Schmidt	7–5, 0–6, 6–4
Runner-up	2.	24 November 2003	Haifa, Israel	Hard	(Ukraine) Veronika Kapshay	(Ukraine) Olena Antypina (Russia) Nina Bratchikova	5–7, 4–6
Runner-up	3.	15 August 2004	Târgu Mureş, Romania	Clay	(Romania) Simona Matei	(Romania) Gabriela Niculescu (Romania) Monica Niculescu	5–7, 1–6
Runner-up	4.	11 October 2004	Dubrovnik, Croatia	Clay	(Czech Republic) Klara Jagosova	(Croatia) Darija Jurak (Croatia) Lucija Krzelj	3–6, 6–4, 3–6

== See also ==
- List of Hungary Fed Cup team representatives
