= Mihaela Moldovan =

Romanian tennis player

- Country (sports): Romania
- Born: 23 March 1981 (age 44)
- Prize money: $15,698

Singles
- Highest ranking: No. 358 (13 September 1999)

Grand Slam singles results
- French Open Junior: 1R (1999)

Doubles
- Highest ranking: No. 379 (13 September 1999)

Grand Slam doubles results
- French Open Junior: 1R (1999)

Mihaela Moldovan (born 23 March 1981) is a Romanian former professional tennis player.

Moldovan has career-high WTA rankings of 358 in singles, achieved on 13 September 1999, and 379 in doubles, set on 13 September 1999. Moldovan retirement from professional tennis in 2005.

Playing for Romania at the Fed Cup, Moldovan has a win–loss record of 3–4.

== ITF finals ==
$100,000 tournaments
$75,000 tournaments
$50,000 tournaments
$25,000 tournaments
$10,000 tournaments

=== Singles (1–3) ===
Outcome	No.	Date	Tournament	Surface	Opponent	Score
Runner-up	1.	July 1998	Skopje, North Macedonia	Clay	(Belgium) Cindy Schuurmans	6–7, 6–7
Runner-up	2.	July 1999	Sezze, Italy	Clay	(Argentina) Clarisa Fernández	2–6, 3–6
Winner	1.	April 2000	Cavtat, Croatia	Clay	(Czech Republic) Paulina Šlitrová	6–4, 2–6, 6–3
Runner-up	3.	June 2005	Bucharest, Romania	Clay	(Romania) Corina-Claudia Corduneanu	2–6, 0–6

=== Doubles (2–3) ===
Outcome	No.	Date	Tournament	Surface	Partner	Opponents	Score
Runner-up	1.	April 1999	San Severo, Italy	Clay	(Romania) Oana Elena Golimbioschi	(Netherlands) Natascha de Kramer (Spain) Laura Pena	5–7, 0–6
Winner	1.	August 1999	Bucharest, Romania	Clay	(North Macedonia) Marina Lazarovska	(Romania) Raluca Ciochină (Romania) Adriana Mingireanu	6–1, 6–2
Winner	2.	August 1999	Bucharest, Romania	Clay	(North Macedonia) Marina Lazarovska	(Romania) Ioana Gașpar (Romania) Carmen-Raluca Țibuleac	3–2 ret.
Runner-up	2.	August 2000	Bucharest, Romania	Clay	(Romania) Alexandra Orăşanu	(Czech Republic) Dominika Luzarová (Czech Republic) Veronika Raimrová	6–2, 5–7, 5–7
Runner-up	3.	June 2005	Bucharest, Romania	Clay	(Romania) Alexandra Dulgheru	(Romania) Corina-Claudia Corduneanu (Romania) Diana Enache	2–2 ret.

== Fed Cup participation ==
=== Singles (2–2) ===
Edition	Stage	Date	Location	Against	Surface	Opponent	W/L	Score
2000 Fed Cup; Europe/Africa Zone Group I	R/R	15 May 2000	Murcia, Spain	(Slovenia) Slovenia	Clay	(Slovenia) Katarina Srebotnik	L	0–6, 3–6
2000 Fed Cup; Europe/Africa Zone Group I	R/R	17 May 2000	Murcia, Spain	Belarus	Clay	(Belarus) Nadejda Ostrovskaya	L	1–6, 5–7
2000 Fed Cup; Europe/Africa Zone Group I	R/R	18 May 2000	Murcia, Spain	Morocco	Clay	(Morocco) Meryem El Haddad	W	6–4, 6–0
2000 Fed Cup; Europe/Africa Zone Group I	R/R	19 May 2000	Murcia, Spain	Poland	Clay	(Poland) Katarzyna Strączy	W	6–4, 6–4

=== Doubles (1–2) ===
Edition	Stage	Date	Location	Against	Surface	Partner	Opponents	W/L	Score
2000 Fed Cup; Europe/Africa Zone Group I	R/R	15 May 2000	Murcia, Spain	(Slovenia) Slovenia	Clay	(Romania) Raluca Ciochină	(Slovenia) Tina Križan (Slovenia) Katarina Srebotnik	L	4–6, 5–7
2000 Fed Cup; Europe/Africa Zone Group I	R/R	17 May 2000	Murcia, Spain	Belarus	Clay	(Romania) Raluca Ciochină	(Belarus) Olga Barabanschikova (Belarus) Tatiana Poutchek	L	2–6, 3–6
2000 Fed Cup; Europe/Africa Zone Group I	R/R	18 May 2000	Murcia, Spain	Morocco	Clay	(Romania) Raluca Ciochină	(Morocco) Habiba Ifrakh (Morocco) Meryem Lahlou	W	6–2, 6–2
