= Dalia Zafirova =

Bulgarian tennis player

Dalia Zafirova Далия Зафирова
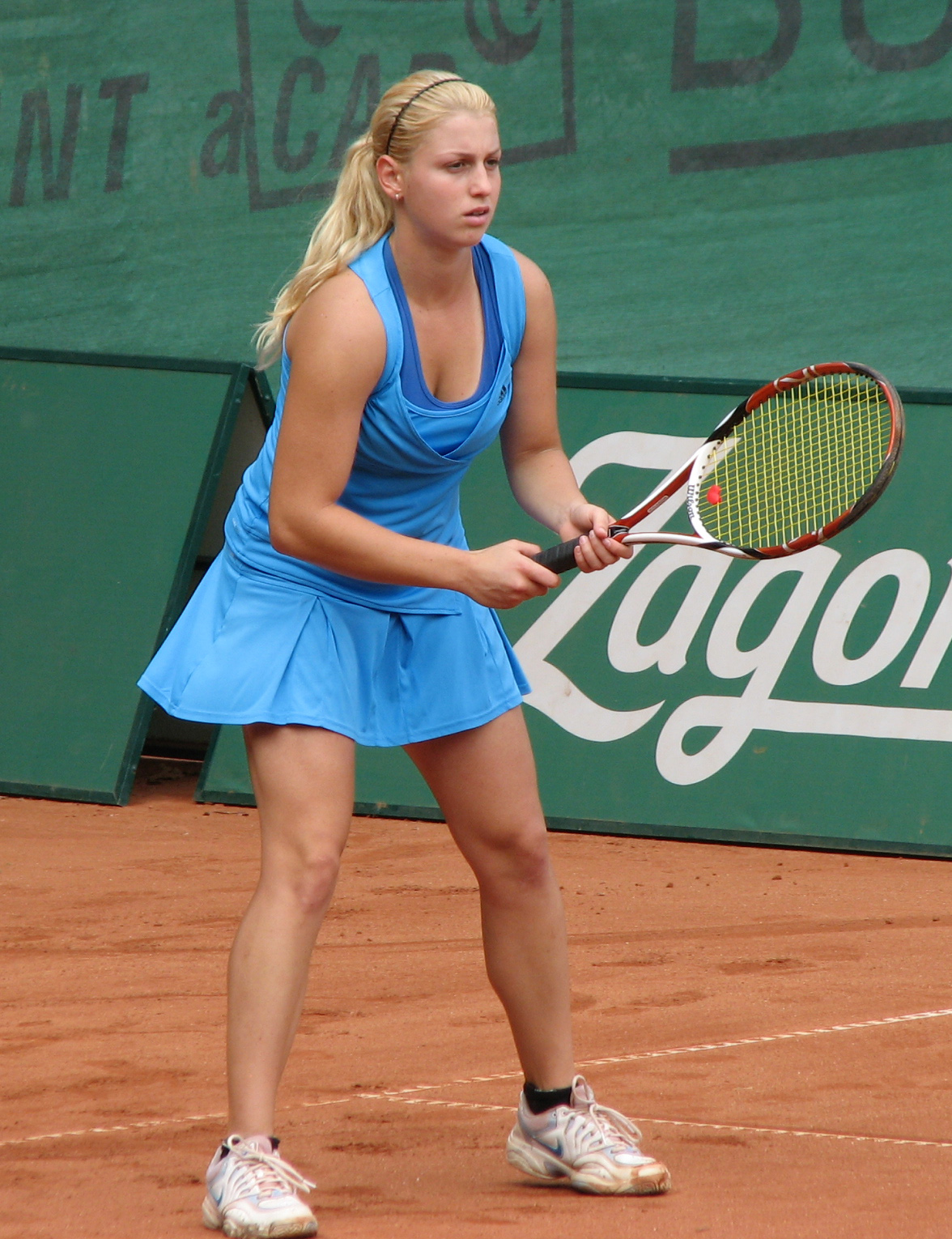
- Dalia Zafirova at the 2009 Allianz Cup
- Country (sports): Bulgaria
- Residence: Bulgaria
- Born: 2 April 1991 (age 35) Sofia, Bulgaria
- Height: 1.70 m (5 ft 7 in)
- Turned pro: 2005
- Retired: 2013
- Plays: Right-handed
- Prize money: US$ 37,877

Singles
- Career record: 110–132
- Career titles: 0 WTA, 2 ITF
- Highest ranking: No. 499 (21 September 2009)

Doubles
- Career record: 103–117
- Career titles: 8 ITF
- Highest ranking: No. 410 (11 November 2013)

Dalia Kirilova Zafirova (Bulgarian: Далия Кирилова Зафирова, born 2 April 1991) is a Bulgarian former professional tennis player and member of the Bulgaria Fed Cup team. On 21 September 2009, she reached her highest WTA singles ranking of 499 whilst her best doubles ranking was 410 on 11 November 2013.

== ITF Circuit finals ==
=== Singles: 5 (2 titles, 3 runner–ups) ===
Legend $25,000 tournaments $10,000 tournaments	Finals by surface Hard (0–0) Clay (2–3)

Result	W–L	Date	Tournament	Tier	Surface	Opponent	Score
Loss	0–1	Oct 2008	ITF Thessaloniki, Greece	10,000	Clay	(Netherlands) Marlot Meddens	1–6, 0–6
Win	1–1	Jul 2009	ITF Prokuplje, Serbia	10,000	Clay	(Serbia) Aleksandra Krunić	6–3, 7–6^{(7–3)}
Loss	1–2	Sep 2011	ITF Varna, Bulgaria	10,000	Clay	(Romania) Raluca Elena Platon	0–6, 1–6
Win	2–2	Sep 2012	ITF Belgrade, Serbia	10,000	Clay	(Slovakia) Lucia Butkovská	6–2, 6–0
Loss	2–3	Sep 2012	ITF Belgrade, Serbia	10,000	Clay	(Serbia) Natalija Kostić	4–6, 3–6

=== Doubles 17 (8 titles, 9 runner–ups) ===
Legend $25,000 tournaments $10,000 tournaments	Finals by surface Hard (0–0) Clay (8–9)

Result	W–L	Date	Tournament	Tier	Surface	Partner	Opponents	Score
Loss	0–1	May 2009	ITF Bucharest, Romania	10,000	Clay	(Bulgaria) Dessislava Mladenova	(Romania) Laura Ioana Paar (Romania) Diana-Andreea Gae	1–6, 7–5, [12–14]
Win	1–1	Apr 2010	ITF Antalya, Turkey	10,000	Clay	(Romania) Mihaela Buzărnescu	(Czech Republic) Veronika Chvojková (Czech Republic) Martina Kubičíková	7–6^{(7–1)}, 7–5
Win	2–1	Apr 2010	ITF Šibenik, Croatia	10,000	Clay	(Romania) Alexandra Cadanțu	(Croatia) Maria Abramović (Romania) Mădălina Gojnea	6–2, 6–3
Loss	2–2	Jul 2010	ITF Bucharest, Romania	10,000	Clay	(Bulgaria) Dessislava Mladenova	(Romania) Diana Enache (Romania) Andreea Mitu	3–6, 1–6
Loss	2–3	May 2011	ITF Velenje, Slovenia	10,000	Clay	(Germany) Dejana Raickovic	(Croatia) Maria Abramović (Germany) Scarlett Werner	4–6, 4–6
Loss	2–4	Jul 2011	ITF Palić, Serbia	10,000	Clay	(Romania) Karina Goia	(Poland) Olga Brózda (Poland) Natalia Kołat	2–6, 3–6
Win	3–4	Oct 2011	ITF Pirot, Serbia	10,000	Clay	(Hungary) Csilla Argyelán	(Serbia) Jelena Lazarević (Romania) Ana Mihaela Vlăduțu	6–2, 6–2
Loss	3–5	Oct 2011	ITF Dubrovnik, Croatia	10,000	Clay	(Czech Republic) Martina Kubičíková	(Russia) Victoria Kan (Czech Republic) Barbora Krejčíková	6–7^{(3–7)}, 0–6
Loss	3–6	May 2012	ITF Timișoara, Romania	10,000	Clay	(North Macedonia) Lina Gjorcheska	(Serbia) Teodora Mirčić (Romania) Andreea Mitu	1–6, 2–6
Win	4–6	Jun 2012	ITF Cologne, Germany	10,000	Clay	(Italy) Julia Mayr	(Brazil) Nathália Rossi (Argentina) Carolina Zeballos	6–1, 6–1
Win	5–6	Jul 2012	ITF Prokuplje, Serbia	10,000	Clay	(North Macedonia) Lina Gjorcheska	(Turkey) Hülya Esen (Turkey) Lütfiye Esen	6–3, 6–2
Loss	5–7	Jul 2012	ITF Prokuplje, Serbia	10,000	Clay	(North Macedonia) Lina Gjorcheska	(Slovakia) Lucia Butkovská (Russia) Victoria Kan	0–6, 6–2, [7–10]
Loss	5–8	Aug 2012	ITF Pirot, Serbia	10,000	Clay	(North Macedonia) Lina Gjorcheska	(Romania) Raluca Elena Platon (Netherlands) Eva Wacanno	2–6, 6–1, [8–10]
Win	6–8	Jul 2013	ITF Prokuplje, Serbia	10,000	Clay	(North Macedonia) Lina Gjorcheska	(Bulgaria) Viktoriya Tomova (Australia) Viktorija Rajicic	6–3, 6–0
Win	7–8	Aug 2013	ITF Brčko, Bosnia and Herzegovina	10,000	Clay	(North Macedonia) Lina Gjorcheska	(Bosnia and Herzegovina) Katarina Jokić (Serbia) Nikolina Jović	7–5, 6–1
Loss	7–9	Sep 2013	ITF Dobrich, Bulgaria	25,000	Clay	(Bulgaria) Isabella Shinikova	(Switzerland) Xenia Knoll (Serbia) Teodora Mirčić	5–7, 6–7^{(5–7)}
Win	8–9	Oct 2013	ITF Albena, Bulgaria	10,000	Clay	(Netherlands) Eva Wacanno	(North Macedonia) Lina Gjorcheska (Romania) Camelia Hristea	4–6, 6–2, [10–8]
