= Ágnes Szatmári =

Romanian tennis player

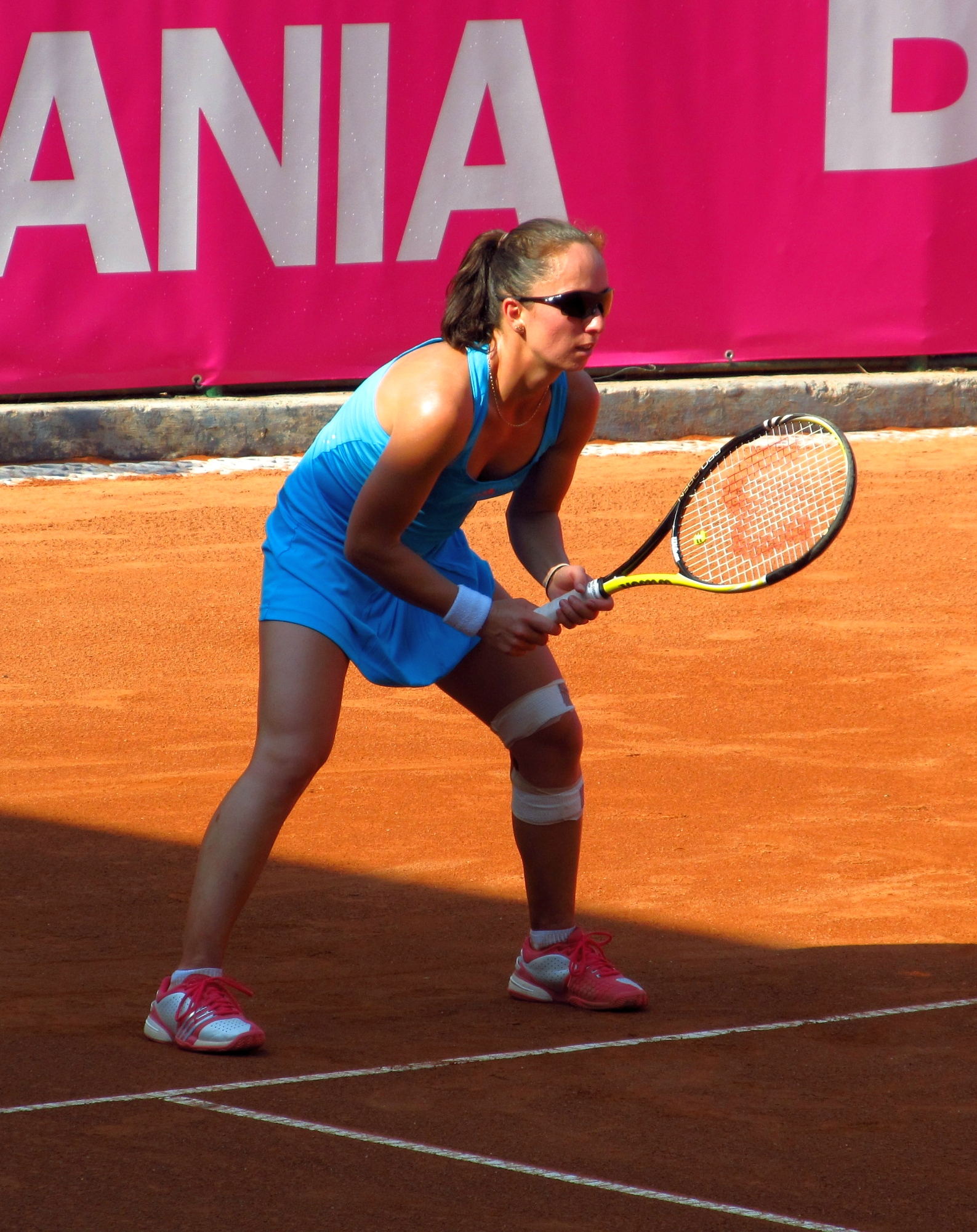
- Agnes Szatmari at the 2012 BCR Open Romania Ladies
- Country (sports): Romania
- Born: 28 June 1987 (age 38) Gheorgheni, Socialist Republic of Romania
- Height: 1.61 m (5 ft 3 1/2 in)
- Turned pro: 2004
- Plays: Right-handed (two-handed backhand)
- Prize money: $124,226

Singles
- Career record: 204–147
- Career titles: 2 ITF
- Highest ranking: No. 187 (24 March 2008)

Grand Slam singles results
- French Open: Q1 (2008)
- Wimbledon: Q1 (2008)

Doubles
- Career record: 169–118
- Career titles: 14 ITF
- Highest ranking: No. 123 (20 August 2007)

Ágnes Szatmári (born 28 June 1987) is a Romanian former professional tennis player.

On 24 March 2008, she reached her highest singles ranking of 187 by the Women's Tennis Association (WTA). On 20 August 2007, she reached her highest WTA doubles ranking of 123.

Over her career, she won two singles and 14 doubles titles on the ITF Women's Circuit.

Szatmári was coached by Portik Endre.

== ITF Circuit finals ==
$75,000 tournaments
$50,000 tournaments
$25,000 tournaments
$10,000 tournaments

=== Singles: 8 (2–6) ===
Result	No.	Date	Tournament	Surface	Opponent	Score
Loss	1.	23 October 2004	Lagos Open, Nigeria	Hard	(United States) Tiffany Dabek	5–7, 0–6
Loss	2.	15 May 2005	ITF Mostar, Bosnia and Herzegovina	Clay	(Serbia) Vanja Ćorović	4–6, 1–6
Win	3.	30 July 2006	ITF Arad, Romania	Clay	(Serbia) Karolina Jovanović	6–1, 6–3
Win	4.	1 October 2006	Batumi Ladies Open, Georgia	Hard	(Czech Republic) Petra Cetkovská	6–3, 6–3
Loss	5.	21 October 2006	Lagos Open, Nigeria	Hard	(Romania) Magda Mihalache	1–6, 6–3, 4–6
Loss	6.	19 May 2007	ITF Thiruvananthapuram, India	Clay	(Mauritius) Marinne Giraud	5–7, 3–6
Loss	7.	25 October 2008	Lagos Open, Nigeria	Hard	(Slovakia) Zuzana Kučová	6–7^{(5)}, 6–4, 3–6
Loss	8.	19 July 2009	ITF Bucha, Ukraine	Clay	(Russia) Yuliya Kalabina	7–6^{(6)}, 6–7^{(5)}, 1–6

=== Doubles: 28 (14–14) ===
Result	No.	Date	Tournament	Surface	Partner	Opponents	Score
Loss	1.	15 May 2005	ITF Mostar, Bosnia and Herzegovina	Clay	(Belgium) Jessie de Vries	(Slovakia) Daniela Krejsová (Slovakia) Michaela Michalková	7–6^{(5)}, 5–7, 1–6
Loss	2.	23 July 2005	ITF Bucharest, Romania	Clay	(Ukraine) Oksana Teplyakova	(Romania) Mădălina Gojnea (Romania) Gabriela Niculescu	3–6, 2–6
Win	3.	27 August 2005	ITF Bucharest, Romania	Clay	(Romania) Corina Corduneanu	(Romania) Liana Ungur (Romania) Simona Matei	w/o
Loss	4.	10 September 2005	ITF Câmpina, Romania	Clay	(Romania) Antonia Xenia Tout	(Romania) Maria Luiza Crăciun (Romania) Ioana Ivan	7–6^{(6)}, 4–6, 4–6
Loss	5.	21 July 2006	ITF Bucharest, Romania	Clay	(Romania) Maria Luiza Crăciun	(Romania) Raluca Ciulei (Kazakhstan) Amina Rakhim	3–6, 1–6
Loss	6.	4 August 2006	ITF Bucharest, Romania	Clay	(Romania) Maria Luiza Crăciun	(Romania) Laura-Ioana Andrei (Romania) Gabriela Niculescu	3–6, 6–3, 4–6
Loss	7.	1 September 2006	ITF Timișoara, Romania	Clay	(Romania) Diana Buzean	(Romania) Corina Corduneanu (Romania) Ioana Gaspar	3–6, 4–6
Win	8.	21 October 2006	Lagos Open, Nigeria	Hard	(South Africa) Surina De Beer	(India) Sanaa Bhambri (India) Rushmi Chakravarthi	6–3, 6–1
Win	9.	19 November 2006	Pune Championships, India	Clay	(Russia) Olga Panova	(Italy) Nicole Clerico (Kyrgyzstan) Ksenia Palkina	6–2, 6–4
Win	10.	17 February 2007	Challenger de Saguenay, Canada	Hard (i)	(Germany) Angelique Kerber	(Germany) Sabine Klaschka (Germany) Angelika Rösch	6–1, 6–4
Loss	11.	18 May 2007	ITF Thiruvananthapuram, India	Clay	(Italy) Nicole Clerico	(United States) Lauren Albanese (Belgium) Yanina Wickmayer	6–3, 5–7, 0–6
Win	12.	3 August 2007	ITF Bucharest, Romania	Clay	(Romania) Sorana Cîrstea	(Romania) Mihaela Buzărnescu (Romania) Monica Niculescu	w/o
Win	13.	18 August 2007	ITF Penza, Russia	Clay	(France) Sophie Lefèvre	(Romania) Mihaela Buzărnescu (Ukraine) Veronika Kapshay	6–1, 6–2
Loss	14.	15 December 2007	Lagos Open, Nigeria	Hard	(France) Iryna Brémond	(South Africa) Kelly Anderson (South Africa) Chanelle Scheepers	6–0, 3–6, [8–10]
Loss	15.	22 December 2007	Lagos Open, Nigeria	Hard	(France) Iryna Brémond	(South Africa) Kelly Anderson (South Africa) Chanelle Scheepers	6–1, 3–6, [6–10]
Loss	16.	11 May 2008	ITF Bucharest, Romania	Clay	(Romania) Sorana Cîrstea	(Czech Republic) Petra Cetkovská (Czech Republic) Hana Šromová	4–6, 5–7
Win	17.	15 June 2008	Open de Marseille, France	Clay	(France) Aurélie Védy	(Ukraine) Viktoriya Kutuzova (Russia) Anna Lapushchenkova	6–4, 6–3
Win	18.	17 October 2008	Lagos Open, Nigeria	Hard	(South Africa) Surina De Beer	(Belgium) Tamaryn Hendler (Italy) Lisa Sabino	7–6^{(7)}, 6–3
Win	19.	21 November 2008	ITF Kolkata, India	Hard	(Germany) Laura Siegemund	(China) Lu Jingjing (China) Sun Shengnan	7–5, 6–3
Loss	20.	4 July 2009	ITF Pozoblanco, Spain	Hard	(Russia) Nina Bratchikova	(Czech Republic) Andrea Hlaváčková (Ukraine) Olga Savchuk	3–6, 3–6
Loss	21.	1 August 2009	ITF Almaty, Kazakhstan	Hard	(Russia) Nina Bratchikova	(Russia) Elena Chalova (Georgia (country)) Oksana Kalashnikova	1–6, 0–6
Loss	22.	8 August 2009	ITF Astana, Kazakhstan	Hard	(Russia) Nina Bratchikova	(Ukraine) Yuliana Fedak (Belarus) Darya Kustova	4–6, 5–7
Win	23.	6 October 2009	ITF Katowice, Poland	Clay	(Poland) Karolina Kosińska	(Austria) Melanie Klaffner (Sweden) Johanna Larsson	6–1, 2–6, [10–5]
Win	24.	25 September 2010	Telavi Open, Georgia	Clay	(Ukraine) Veronika Kapshay	(Georgia (country)) Oksana Kalashnikova (Austria) Melanie Klaffner	6–1, 2–6, [10–8]
Win	25.	22 October 2010	Lagos Open, Nigeria	Hard	(Russia) Nina Bratchikova	(Sweden) Anna Brazhnikova (Russia) Anastasia Mukhametova	6–4, 6–3
Loss	26.	29 October 2010	Lagos Open, Nigeria	Hard	(Russia) Nina Bratchikova	(Austria) Melanie Klaffner (Poland) Karolina Kosińska	6–3, 5–7, [7–10]
Win	27.	28 October 2011	Lagos Open, Nigeria	Hard	(Austria) Melanie Klaffner	(Montenegro) Danka Kovinić (Ukraine) Elina Svitolina	6–0, 6–7^{(1)}, [10–5]
Win	28.	7 September 2014	ITF Galați, Romania	Clay	(Romania) Oana Georgeta Simion	(Romania) Diana Buzean (Spain) Arabela Fernández Rabener	4–6, 6–4, [10–8]

== Year-end rankings ==
Year	Singles	Doubles
2015	-	756
2014	869	822
2013	1109	-
2012	-	487
2011	560	463
2010	424	316
2009	248	172
2008	200	182
2007	297	136
2006	325	328
2005	545	411
2004	743	537
