= Ioana Gașpar =

Romanian tennis player (born 1983)

- Country (sports): Romania
- Residence: Timișoara
- Born: 17 April 1983 (age 43) Timișoara, Socialist Republic of Romania
- Height: 1.65 m (5 ft 5 in)
- Plays: Right-handed (two-handed backhand)
- Coach: Niculae Vlad
- Prize money: US$ 73,651

Singles
- Career record: 229–161
- Career titles: 7 ITF
- Highest ranking: No. 258 (17 September 2001)

Doubles
- Career record: 190–141
- Career titles: 10 ITF
- Highest ranking: No. 310 (17 September 2001)

Team competitions
- Fed Cup: 1–4

Ioana Gașpar-Ivan (born 17 April 1983) is a former tennis player from Romania.

In May 2010, Ioana married her tennis coach, Mădălin Ivan, and changed her name to Gașpar-Ivan. But her name is listed on both WTA and ITF sites as Ioana Gașpar.

On 17 September 2001, she reached her career-high singles ranking of world No. 258. In her career, she won seven singles titles and ten doubles titles on the ITF Women's Circuit.

== ITF Circuit finals ==
Legend
$25,000 tournaments
$15,000 tournaments
$10,000 tournaments

=== Singles: 9 (7 titles, 2 runner-ups) ===
Result	W–L	Date	Tournament	Tier	Surface	Opponent	Score
Win	1–0	Aug 1999	ITF Bucharest, Romania	10,000	Clay	(Romania) Raluca Ciochină	0–6, 6–3, 6–3
Win	2–0	Apr 2000	ITF Cerignola, Italy	10,000	Clay	(Switzerland) Aliénor Tricerri	4–6, 6–3, 6–1
Loss	2–1	Oct 2000	ITF Makarska, Croatia	25,000	Clay	(Czech Republic) Zuzana Ondrášková	2–6, 3–6
Win	3–1	Oct 2000	ITF Ciampino, Italy	10,000	Clay	(Romania) Andreea Ehritt-Vanc	5–4, 4–1, 4–1
Win	4–1	Nov 2000	ITF Stupava, Slovakia	10,000	Hard (i)	(Czech Republic) Magdalena Zděnovcová	5–3, 5–4, 4–2
Loss	4–2	Jul 2007	ITF Bucharest, Romania	10,000	Clay	(Romania) Alexandra Cadanțu	2–6, 3–6
Win	5–2	Sep 2018	ITF Székesfehérvár, Hungary	15,000	Clay	(Hungary) Vanda Lukács	7–5, 6–3
Win	6–2	Dec 2018	ITF Antalya, Turkey	15,000	Hard	(France) Carole Monnet	6–1, 6–2
Win	7–2	May 2021	ITF Heraklion, Greece	15,000	Clay	(Romania) Arina Vasilescu	6–0, 6–1

=== Doubles: 28 (10 titles, 18 runner-ups) ===
Result	W–L	Date	Tournament	Tier	Surface	Partnering	Opponents	Score
Loss	0–1	Aug 1999	ITF Bucharest, Romania	10,000	Clay	(Romania) Carmen-Raluca Țibuleac	(North Macedonia) Marina Lazarovska (Romania) Mihaela Moldovan	2–3 ret.
Loss	0–2	Jan 2002	ITF Skopje, Macedonia	10,000	Clay	(Romania) Ramona But	(North Macedonia) Marina Lazarovska (Federal Republic of Yugoslavia) Ljiljana Nanušević	4–6, 7–5, 3–6
Win	1–2	May 2004	ITF Oradea, Romania	10,000	Clay	(Romania) Lavinia Toader	(Romania) Bianca Bonifate (Romania) Diana Gae	2–6, 6–1, 6–2
Win	2–2	Sep 2006	ITF Timișoara, Romania	10,000	Clay	(Romania) Corina Corduneanu	(Romania) Diana Enache (Romania) Ágnes Szatmári	6–3, 6–4
Loss	2–3	May 2007	ITF Bucharest, Romania	10,000	Clay	(Romania) Laura Ioana Andrei	(Romania) Simona Halep (Romania) Ionela-Andreea Iova	4–6, 6–2, 3–6
Loss	2–4	May 2007	ITF Bucharest, Romania	10,000	Clay	(Romania) Laura Ioana Andrei	(Romania) Irina-Camelia Begu (Romania) Simona Halep	4–6, 2–6
Win	3–4	Jul 2008	ITF Bucharest, Romania	10,000	Clay	(Romania) Irina-Camelia Begu	(Romania) Mihaela Bunea (Romania) Gabriela Niculescu	4–6, 6–3, [10–3]
Win	4–4	Jun 2009	ITF Bucharest, Romania	10,000	Clay	(Romania) Laura Ioana Andrei	(Romania) Simona Matei (Romania) Andreea Mitu	6–3, 7–6^{(3)}
Loss	4–5	Jun 2009	ITF Bucharest, Romania	10,000	Clay	(Romania) Laura Ioana Andrei	(Romania) Mihaela Buzărnescu (Romania) Elora Dabija	6–1, 5–7, [5–10]
Win	5–5	Jul 2009	ITF Bucharest, Romania	10,000	Clay	(Romania) Simona Matei	(Romania) Ionela-Andreea Iova (Romania) Andreea Mitu	7–6^{(6)}, 6–1
Loss	5–6	Jun 2010	ITF Bucharest, Romania	10,000	Clay	(Romania) Elora Dabija	(Romania) Laura Ioana Andrei (Romania) Mădălina Gojnea	2–6, 4–6
Loss	5–7	Nov 2017	ITF Heraklion, Greece	15,000	Clay	(Serbia) Bojana Marinković	(Hungary) Anna Bondár (Hungary) Réka Luca Jani	4–6, 6–2, [8–10]
Loss	5–8	Mar 2018	ITF Heraklion, Greece	15,000	Clay	(Belgium) Michaela Boev	(Denmark) Emilie Francati (Denmark) Maria Jespersen	3–6, 1–6
Loss	5–9	Jul 2018	ITF Bucharest, Romania	15,000	Clay	(Romania) Camelia-Elena Hristea	(United Kingdom) Soumeya Anane (Malta) Elaine Genovese	4–6, 6–3, [2–10]
Loss	5–10	Aug 2018	ITF Arad, Romania	15,000	Clay	(Romania) Camelia-Elena Hristea	(Romania) Cristina Ene (Romania) Ioana Loredana Roșca	3–6, 4–6
Win	6–10	Nov 2018	ITF Antalya, Turkey	15,000	Clay	(Romania) Gabriela Nicole Tătăruș	(Turkey) İpek Öz (Turkey) Melis Sezer	6–7^{(3)}, 7–5, [10–4]
Loss	6–11	Nov 2018	ITF Antalya, Turkey	15,000	Clay	(Romania) Oana Georgeta Simion	(Germany) Lisa Ponomar (Japan) Naho Sato	4–6, 2–6
Loss	6–12	Nov 2018	ITF Antalya, Turkey	15,000	Clay	(Romania) Andreea Prisăcariu	(Romania) Georgia Crăciun (Romania) Oana Georgeta Simion	1–6, 3–6
Win	7–12	Feb 2019	ITF Antalya, Turkey	15,000	Clay	(Romania) Karola Patricia Bejenaru	(Sweden) Fanny Östlund (Russia) Anna Ureke	6–4, 6–3
Win	8–12	Jul 2019	ITF Tabarka, Tunisia	15,000	Clay	(Colombia) Yuliana Lizarazo	(Slovakia) Alica Rusová (Bolivia) Noelia Zeballos	7–5, 6–3
Loss	8–13	Nov 2019	ITF Antalya, Turkey	15,000	Hard	(Switzerland) Jenny Dürst	(Japan) Haine Ogata (Japan) Aiko Yoshitomi	1–6, 1–6
Loss	8–14	Dec 2019	ITF Antalya, Turkey	15,000	Hard	(Russia) Nina Rudiukova	(Netherlands) Quirine Lemoine (Netherlands) Gabriella Mujan	3–6, 4–6
Win	9–14	Dec 2019	ITF Antalya, Turkey	15,000	Hard	(Romania) Georgia Crăciun	(Switzerland) Leonie Küng (Turkey) Melis Sezer	6–4, 1–6, [14–12]
Loss	9–15	Feb 2020	ITF Heraklion, Greece	15,000	Clay	(Germany) Romy Kölzer	(Italy) Martina Colmegna (Italy) Dalila Spiteri	6–4, 0–6, [6–10]
Loss	9–16	Mar 2020	ITF Heraklion, Greece	15,000	Clay	(Spain) Rebeka Masarova	(Serbia) Tamara Čurović (Sweden) Fanny Östlund	4–6, 5–7
Loss	9–17	Jun 2021	ITF Heraklion, Greece	15,000	Clay	(Poland) Weronika Falkowska	(Germany) Julia Kimmelmann (United Kingdom) Anna Popescu	2–6, 4–6
Win	10–17	Jun 2021	ITF Prokuplje, Serbia	15,000	Clay	(Russia) Ekaterina Vishnevskaya	(France) Alice Robbe (Serbia) Draginja Vuković	6–4, 6–3
Loss	10–18	Sep 2022	ITF Brașov, Romania	15,000	Clay	(Romania) Ilinca Amariei	(Slovenia) Nastja Kolar (Serbia) Bojana Marinković	4–6, 4–6

=== Junior Grand Slam finals ===
==== Doubles: 1 (title) ====
Result	Year	Tournament	Surface	Partnering	Opponents	Score
Win	2000	Wimbledon	Grass	(Ukraine) Tatiana Perebiynis	(Czech Republic) Dája Bedáňová (Argentina) María Emilia Salerni	7–6^{(7–2)}, 6–3
