= Raluca Ciochină =

Romanian tennis player

- Country (sports): Romania
- Born: 16 February 1983 (age 42); Bucharest, Romania
- Prize money: $15,698

Singles
- Career titles: 2 ITF
- Highest ranking: No. 386 (13 September 1999)

Doubles
- Career titles: 0
- Highest ranking: No. 502 (24 April 2000)

Raluca Ciochină (born 16 February 1983) is a Romanian former professional tennis player.

Born in Bucharest, Ciochină was the girls' 16-and-under Orange Bowl champion in 1999, also winning the doubles title.

From 2000 to 2002, she appeared in six Fed Cup ties for the Romania Fed Cup team.

Ciochină left the professional tour in 2002 to study and play college tennis at the University of Pennsylvania, before ultimately settling in the United States.

== ITF finals ==
=== Singles (2–4) ===
Outcome	No.	Date	Tournament	Surface	Opponent	Score
Runner-up	1.	30 May 1999	Oliveira de Azeméis, Portugal	Hard	(Israel) Tzipora Obziler	1–6, 1–6
Runner-up	2.	8 August 1999	Bucharest, Romania	Clay	(Romania) Ioana Gașpar	6–0, 3–6, 3–6
Winner	1.	15 August 1999	Bucharest, Romania	Clay	(Austria) Bianca Kamper	6–0, 6–1
Winner	2.	27 August 1999	Bucharest, Romania	Clay	(Romania) Adriana Burz	6–2, 5–7, 6–4
Runner-up	3.	6 August 2000	Bucharest, Romania	Clay	(United States) Edina Gallovits-Hall	3–6, 3–6
Runner-up	4.	3 June 2001	Warsaw, Poland	Clay	(Poland) Joanna Sakowicz-Kostecka	6–1, 2–6, 1–6

=== Doubles (0–1) ===
Outcome	Date	Tournament	Surface	Partnering	Opponents	Score
Runner-up	2 August 1999	Bucharest, Romania	Clay	(Romania) Adriana Mingireanu	(Romania) Mihaela Moldovan (North Macedonia) Marina Lazarovska	1–6, 2–6
