= Neda Kozić =

Serbian tennis player and coach

Neda Kozić Неда Козић
- Country (sports): Serbia and Montenegro (2004–2006) / Serbia (2006–2013)
- Residence: Long Island City, United States
- Born: November 21, 1985 (age 39); Belgrade, SR Serbia, SFR Yugoslavia
- Turned pro: 2004
- Retired: 2013
- Plays: Right-handed (two-handed backhand)
- Prize money: $45,972

Singles
- Career record: 132–124
- Career titles: 0
- Highest ranking: No. 399 (15 September 2008)

Doubles
- Career record: 114–110
- Career titles: 9 ITF
- Highest ranking: No. 224 (13 October 2008)

Neda Kozić (Serbian Cyrillic: Неда Козић; born 21 November 1985) is a Serbian tennis coach and former professional tennis player.

Kozić has career-high WTA rankings of 399 in singles, achieved on 15 September 2008, and 224 in doubles, set on 13 October 2008. She won nine doubles titles at tournaments of the ITF Women's Circuit.

== Biography and Coaching ==
Neda Kozić was born in Serbia and took up tennis at age 12 to help on her path to becoming a professional soccer player. She continued with tennis, began touring professionally from 2003- 2011, and achieved a WTA ranking of No. 399 in singles and 224 in doubles —along with wins over Ana Ivanovic and Mona Barthel. Her coaching accolades include being an adviser to professional players Aleksandra Krunić, Jelena Janković, Georgina Garcia Perez and other highly ranked singles and doubles players on the WTA Tour.

In 2010, Kozić team competed with Bielefelder TC in German tennis league.

In 2011, Kozić fine-tuned her coaching abilities and met Ana Bezjak, developing a specialized program with her to prepare promising junior players for competition. She has worked with WTA players Janković, and Darija Jurak, and Ellie Douglas, one of the top U.S. juniors. Neda joined the teaching staff at Manhattan Plaza Racquet Club in 2015. She has her USPTA certification and instructs several of our Adult Programs as well as the Quick Start Program (10yrs & younger) where, with her help, some future tennis stars are being trained. Her vast experience, and passion for tennis has led her to be a highly respected tennis coach. She teaches students of all levels with terrific energy.
