= Palić Open =

ITF Women's Tour
- Event name: Palić
- Location: Palić, Serbia
- Venue: Tennis Club Palić 1878
- Category: ITF Women's Circuit
- Surface: Clay
- Draw: 32S/32Q/16D
- Prize money: $10,000

The Palić Open was a tournament for professional female tennis players played on outdoor clay courts. The event was classified as a $10,000 ITF Women's Circuit tournament and was held in Palić, Serbia, from 2004 to 2016. In 2008, the tournament was upgraded to $50k level, however it remained a $10k tournament afterwards.

== Past finals ==
=== Singles ===
Year	Champion	Runner-up	Score
2016	(Hungary) Ágnes Bukta	(France) Sara Cakarevic	6–4, 1–6, 6–4
2015	(Australia) Alexandra Nancarrow	(Slovakia) Zuzana Zlochová	6–1, 6–4
2014	(Ukraine) Elizaveta Ianchuk	(Hungary) Ágnes Bukta	6–7^{(11–13)}, 7–5, 6–4
2013	(Hungary) Réka Luca Jani	(Serbia) Milana Spremo	6–0, 6–3
2012	(Russia) Victoria Kan	(Serbia) Doroteja Erić	6–1, 6–4
2011	(Russia) Sabrina Kurbanova	(Czech Republic) Dana Machálková	1–6, 7–6^{(7–5)}, 6–3
2010	(Slovakia) Zuzana Zlochová	(Bulgaria) Martina Gledacheva	6–1, ret.
2009	(Hungary) Aleksandra Filipovski	(Croatia) Ani Mijačika	6–3, 7–5
2008	(Slovakia) Lenka Wienerová	(Hungary) Katalin Marosi	7–5, 7–6^{(8–6)}
2007	(Slovenia) Tadeja Majerič	(Bulgaria) Biljana Pavlova	6–2, 6–2
2006	(Bulgaria) Dia Evtimova	(Czech Republic) Iveta Gerlová	6–0, 6–4
2005	(Hungary) Miljana Adanko	(Serbia and Montenegro) Ana Jovanović	7–5, 6–1
2004	(Czech Republic) Eva Hrdinová	(Serbia and Montenegro) Andrea Popović	6–0, 3–6, 6–0

=== Doubles ===
Year	Champions	Runners-up	Score
2016	(Serbia) Barbara Bonić (Bulgaria) Dia Evtimova	(Czech Republic) Petra Krejsová (Slovenia) Nina Potočnik	6–3, 6–3
2015	(Czech Republic) Nina Holanová (Slovakia) Barbara Kötelesová	(Serbia) Dajana Dukić (Australia) Alexandra Nancarrow	6–3, 5–7, [10–6]
2014	(North Macedonia) Lina Gjorcheska (Ukraine) Elizaveta Ianchuk	(Romania) Irina Maria Bara (Romania) Camelia Hristea	6–4, 6–1
2013	(Slovakia) Vivien Juhászová (Czech Republic) Tereza Malíková	(Serbia) Katarina Adamović (Montenegro) Vladica Babić	3–6, 6–4, [10–5]
2012	(Slovakia) Karin Morgošová (Slovakia) Lenka Tvarošková	(Hungary) Csilla Borsányi (Hungary) Ágnes Bukta	5–7, 6–4, [10–8]
2011	(Poland) Olga Brózda (Poland) Natalia Kołat	(Romania) Karina Goia (Bulgaria) Dalia Zafirova	6–2, 6–3
2010	(Bosnia and Herzegovina) Jasmina Kajtazović (Slovakia) Zuzana Zlochová	(Bulgaria) Martina Gledacheva (Italy) Francesca Mazzali	6–1, 4–6, [10–7]
2009	(Hungary) Dunja Antunovic (Croatia) Ani Mijačika	(Poland) Katarzyna Kawa (Slovakia) Simona Parajová	6–4, 6–0
2008	(Poland) Olga Brózda (Poland) Magdalena Kiszczyńska	(Bosnia and Herzegovina) Mervana Jugić-Salkić (Serbia) Teodora Mirčić	6–3, 7–6^{(7–5)}
2007	(Slovakia) Martina Babáková (Belgium) Davinia Lobbinger	(Bulgaria) Huliya Velieva (Bulgaria) Lyutfya Velieva	6–2, 6–3
2006	(Hungary) Miljana Adanko (Slovenia) Anja Prislan	(Czech Republic) Iveta Gerlová (Germany) Maren Kassens	7–6^{(7–3)}, 2–6, 7–6^{(7–5)}
2005	(Serbia and Montenegro) Karolina Jovanović (Serbia and Montenegro) Nataša Zorić	(Serbia and Montenegro) Tatjana Ječmenica (France) Ana-Maria Zubori	6–1, 6–4
2004	(Serbia and Montenegro) Ana Četnik (Serbia and Montenegro) Ljiljana Nanušević	(Serbia and Montenegro) Karolina Jovanović (Serbia and Montenegro) Nataša Zorić	walkover
