= 2012 Fed Cup Europe/Africa Zone Group I – Pool B =

Group B of the 2012 Fed Cup Europe/Africa Zone Group I was one of four pools in the Europe/Africa zone of the 2012 Fed Cup. Three teams competed in a round robin competition, with the top team and the bottom team proceeding to their respective sections of the play-offs: the top team played for advancement to the World Group II Play-offs, while the bottom team faced potential relegation to Group II.

		(Sweden) SWE	(Hungary) HUN	(Greece) GRE	(Bosnia and Herzegovina) BIH	RR; W–L	Set; W–L	Game; W–L	Standings
19	Sweden		2–1	2–1	3–0	3–0	10–3	73–37	1
34	Hungary	1–2		3–0	2–1	2–1	9–4	107–82	2
39	Greece	1–2	0–3		0–3	0–3	1–12	46–79	4
45	Bosnia and Herzegovina	0–3	1–2	3–0		1–2	16–10	77–96	3

== Sweden vs. Bosnia and Herzegovina ==
Sweden
3
Municipal Tennis Club, Eilat, Israel
February 1, 2012
Hard (outdoors)

Bosnia and Herzegovina
0

			1	2	3
1	(Sweden) (Bosnia and Herzegovina)	Sofia Arvidsson; Jelena Stanivuk	6; 1	6; 0
2	(Sweden) (Bosnia and Herzegovina)	Johanna Larsson; Anita Husarić	6; 2	6; 1
3	(Sweden) (Bosnia and Herzegovina)	Sofia Arvidsson / Johanna Larsson; Jelena Stanivuk / Jasmina Tinjić	6; 2	6; 3

== Hungary vs. Greece ==
Hungary
3
Municipal Tennis Club, Eilat, Israel
February 1, 2012
Hard (outdoors)

Greece
0

			1	2	3
1	(Hungary) (Greece)	Réka-Luca Jani; Maria Sakkari	6; 4	7; 5
2	(Hungary) (Greece)	Tímea Babos; Despina Papamichail	6; 4	6; 0
3	(Hungary) (Greece)	Tímea Babos / Katalin Marosi; Despina Papamichail / Agni Stefanou	6; 2	6; 4

== Sweden vs. Hungary ==
Sweden
2
Municipal Tennis Club, Eilat, Israel
February 2, 2012
Hard (outdoors)

Hungary
1

			1	2	3
1	(Sweden) (Hungary)	Sofia Arvidsson; Réka-Luca Jani	6; 4	6; 3
2	(Sweden) (Hungary)	Johanna Larsson; Tímea Babos	5; 7	5; 7
3	(Sweden) (Hungary)	Sofia Arvidsson / Johanna Larsson; Tímea Babos / Réka-Luca Jani	7^{11} 6^{9}	2; 6	6; 4

== Greece vs. Bosnia and Herzegovina ==
Greece
0
Municipal Tennis Club, Eilat, Israel
February 2, 2012
Hard (outdoors)

Bosnia and Herzegovina
3

			1	2	3
1	(Greece) (Bosnia and Herzegovina)	Maria Sakkari; Anita Husarić	4; 6	4; 6
2	(Greece) (Bosnia and Herzegovina)	Despina Papamichail; Jasmina Tinjić	6^{7} 7^{9}	2; 6
3	(Greece) (Bosnia and Herzegovina)	Despina Papamichail / Maria Sakkari; Jelena Stanivuk / Jasmina Tinjić	4; 6	7; 5	0; 6

== Sweden vs. Greece ==
Sweden
2
Municipal Tennis Club, Eilat, Israel
February 3, 2012
Hard (outdoors)

Greece
1

			1	2	3
1	(Sweden) (Greece)	Ellen Allgurin; Maria Sakkari	6; 1	6; 2
2	(Sweden) (Greece)	Hilda Melander; Despina Papamichail	4; 6	4; 6
3	(Sweden) (Greece)	Ellen Allgurin / Hilda Melander; Despina Papamichail / Agni Stefanou	6; 1	6; 2

== Hungary vs. Bosnia and Herzegovina ==
Hungary
2
Municipal Tennis Club, Eilat, Israel
February 3, 2012
Hard (outdoors)

Bosnia and Herzegovina
1

			1	2	3
1	(Hungary) (Bosnia and Herzegovina)	Réka-Luca Jani; Anita Husarić	3; 6	6; 1	6; 2
2	(Hungary) (Bosnia and Herzegovina)	Tímea Babos; Jasmina Tinjić	4; 6	2; 6
3	(Hungary) (Bosnia and Herzegovina)	Tímea Babos / Réka-Luca Jani; Jelena Stanivuk / Jasmina Tinjić	6; 1	6; 4

== See also ==
- Fed Cup structure
