= Jelena Stanivuk =

- Country (sports): Croatia– 2011; Bosnia and Herzegovina 2012
- Born: 17 February 1988 (age 38) Tuzla, Bosnia and Herzegovina
- College: Baylor University
- Prize money: $8,588

Singles
- Career record: 30–30
- Career titles: 0
- Highest ranking: 706 (30 July 2007)

Doubles
- Career record: 28–24
- Career titles: 2 ITF
- Highest ranking: 544 (29 May 2006)

Team competitions
- Fed Cup: 1–3

Jelena Stanivuk (born 17 February 1988) is a Bosnia and Herzegovinan former tennis player who also competed for Croatia. She was studying at Baylor University, between 2007 and 2011.

Playing for Bosnia and Herzegovina in the Fed Cup, Stanivuk has a win/loss record of 1–3. In 2013, she was the captain of the Bosnia and Herzegovina Fed Cup team.

== ITF finals ==
=== Doubles: 5 (2–3) ===
| Legend $100,000 tournaments $75,000 tournaments $50,000 tournaments $25,000 tournaments $10,000 tournaments | Finals by surface Hard (0–0) Clay (2–3) Grass (0–0) Carpet (0–0) |

| Outcome | No. | Date | Tournament | Surface | Partner | Opponents | Score |
|---|---|---|---|---|---|---|---|
| Winner | 1. | 22 May 2005 | ITF Zadar, Croatia | Clay | (Croatia) Josipa Bek | (Serbia and Montenegro) Bernadetta Birkas (Japan) Sayaka Yoshino | 6–0, 6–0 |
| Winner | 2. | 13 May 2006 | ITF Mostar, Bosnia and Herzegovina | Clay | (Croatia) Ani Mijačika | (Serbia and Montenegro) Karolina Jovanović (Slovenia) Polona Reberšak | 6–7^{(0)}, 7–6^{(4)}, 6–4 |
| Runner-up | 1. | 21 May 2006 | ITF Zadar, Croatia | Clay | (Slovenia) Polona Reberšak | (Croatia) Josipa Bek (Croatia) Ani Mijačika | 4–6, 6–2, 1–6 |
| Runner-up | 2. | 1 April 2007 | ITF Dubrovnik, Croatia | Clay | (Croatia) Mirna Marinović | (Serbia) Karolina Jovanović (Serbia) Nataša Zorić | 1–5 ret. |
| Runner-up | 3. | 13 May 2007 | ITF Mostar, Bosnia and Herzegovina | Clay | (Bosnia and Herzegovina) Dijana Stojić | (Italy) Elena Pioppo (Italy) Gabriella Polito | 2–6, 4–6 |

== Junior career ==
Stanivuk has a career-high ITF juniors ranking of 482, achieved on 29 March 2005.

=== ITF Junior Circuit finals ===
Grand Slam
Category GA
Category G1
Category G2
Category G3
Category G4
Category G5

==== Doubles (0–1) ====
| Outcome | Date | Tournament | Grade | Surface | Partner | Opponents | Score |
|---|---|---|---|---|---|---|---|
| Runner-up | 7 September 2003 | Bled, Slovenia | G5 | Clay | (Croatia) Anja Mihaldinec | (Croatia) Andrea Hadziev (Croatia) Mateja Horvat | 4–6, 6–7^{(3–7)} |

== National representation ==
=== Fed Cup ===
Stanivuk made her Fed Cup debut for Bosnia and Herzegovina in 2012, while the team was competing in the Europe/Africa Zone Group I.

==== Fed Cup (1–3) ====
| Group membership World Group (0–0) World Group Play-off (0–0) World Group II (0–0) World Group II Play-off (0–0) Europe/Africa Group (1–3) | Matches by surface Hard (1–3) Clay (0–0) Grass (0–0) Carpet (0–0) | Matches by type Singles (0–1) Doubles (1–2) | Matches by setting Indoors (0–0) Outdoors (1–3) |

==== Singles (0–1) ====
| Edition | Stage | Date | Location | Against | Surface | Opponent | W/L | Score |
|---|---|---|---|---|---|---|---|---|
| 2012 Fed Cup; Europe/Africa Zone Group I | Pool B | 1 February 2012 | Eilat, Israel | Sweden | Hard | Sofia Arvidsson | L | 1–6, 0–6 |

==== Doubles (1–2) ====
| Edition | Stage | Date | Location | Against | Surface | Partner | Opponents | W/L | Score |
|---|---|---|---|---|---|---|---|---|---|
| 2012 Fed Cup; Europe/Africa Zone Group I | Pool B | 1 February 2012 | Eilat, Israel | Sweden | Hard | Jasmina Tinjić | Sofia Arvidsson; Johanna Larsson | L | 2–6, 3–6 |
| 2012 Fed Cup; Europe/Africa Zone Group I | Pool B | 2 February 2012 | Eilat, Israel | Greece | Hard | Jasmina Tinjić | Despina Papamichail; Maria Sakkari | W | 6–4, 5–7, 6–0 |
| 2012 Fed Cup; Europe/Africa Zone Group I | Pool B | 3 February 2012 | Eilat, Israel | Hungary | Hard | Jasmina Tinjić | Tímea Babos; Réka Luca Jani | L | 1–6, 4–6 |
