= 2011 Fed Cup Europe/Africa Zone Group I – Pool C =

Group C of the 2011 Fed Cup Europe/Africa Zone Group I was one of four pools in the Europe/Africa zone of the 2011 Fed Cup. Three teams competed in a round robin competition, with the top team and the bottom team proceeding to their respective sections of the play-offs: the top team played for advancement to the World Group II Play-offs, while the bottom team faced potential relegation to Group II.

		(Belarus) BLR	(Austria) AUT	(Croatia) CRO	(Greece) GRE	RR; W–L	Set; W–L	Game; W–L	Standings
26	Belarus		3–0	3–0	3–0	3–0	17–0	104–30	1
30	Austria	0–3		0–3	3–0	1–2	8–13	51–86	3
38	Croatia	0–3	3–0		0–3	1–2	9–14	92–115	2
44	Greece	0–3	0–3	3–0		1–2	7–15	73–108	4

== Belarus vs. Austria ==
Belarus
3
Municipal Tennis Club, Eilat, Israel
February 2, 2011
Hard (outdoors)

Austria
0

			1	2	3
1	(Belarus) (Austria)	Olga Govortsova; Patricia Mayr-Achleitner	6; 2	6; 1
2	(Belarus) (Austria)	Victoria Azarenka; Sybille Bammer	6; 4	6; 1
3	(Belarus) (Austria)	Darya Kustova / Tatiana Poutchek; Sandra Klemenschits / Patricia Mayr-Achleitner	6; 0	6; 2

== Croatia vs. Greece ==
Croatia
0
Municipal Tennis Club, Eilat, Israel
February 2, 2011
Hard (outdoors)

Greece
3

			1	2	3
1	(Croatia) (Greece)	Jelena Pandžić; Eirini Georgatou	6; 2	1; 6	4; 6
2	(Croatia) (Greece)	Ajla Tomljanović; Eleni Daniilidou	6; 4	3; 6	4; 6
3	(Croatia) (Greece)	Ani Mijačika / Silvia Njirić; Eleni Daniilidou / Eirini Georgatou	3; 6	6; 2	2; 6

== Belarus vs. Croatia ==
Belarus
3
Municipal Tennis Club, Eilat, Israel
February 3, 2011
Hard (outdoors)

Croatia
0

			1	2	3
1	(Belarus) (Croatia)	Olga Govortsova; Ani Mijačika	6; 2	6; 2
2	(Belarus) (Croatia)	Victoria Azarenka; Jelena Pandžić	6; 3	6; 1
3	(Belarus) (Croatia)	Darya Kustova / Tatiana Poutchek; Silvia Njirić / Ajla Tomljanović	6; 2	6; 4

== Austria vs. Greece ==
Austria
3
Municipal Tennis Club, Eilat, Israel
February 3, 2011
Hard (outdoors)

Greece
0

			1	2	3
1	(Austria) (Greece)	Patricia Mayr-Achleitner; Eirini Georgatou	4; 6	6; 3	6; 3
2	(Austria) (Greece)	Sybille Bammer; Eleni Daniilidou	7; 5	6; 3
3	(Austria) (Greece)	Melanie Klaffner / Sandra Klemenschits; Eirini Georgatou / Despina Papamichail	6; 2	6; 1

== Belarus vs. Greece ==
Belarus
3
Municipal Tennis Club, Eilat, Israel
February 4, 2011
Hard (outdoors)

Greece
0

			1	2	3
1	(Belarus) (Greece)	Olga Govortsova; Eirini Georgatou	6; 2	6; 3
2	(Belarus) (Greece)	Victoria Azarenka; Eleni Daniilidou	6; 0	2; 0		retired
3	(Belarus) (Greece)	Darya Kustova / Tatiana Poutchek; Anna Gerasimou / Despina Papamichail	6; 0	6; 1

== Austria vs. Croatia ==
Austria
0
Municipal Tennis Club, Eilat, Israel
February 4, 2011
Hard (outdoors)

Croatia
3

			1	2	3
1	(Austria) (Croatia)	Patricia Mayr-Achleitner; Ani Mijačika	6; 4	6^{2} 7^{7}	5; 7
2	(Austria) (Croatia)	Sybille Bammer; Ajla Tomljanović	6; 4	6^{0} 7^{7}	1; 6
3	(Austria) (Croatia)	Melanie Klaffner / Sandra Klemenschits; Ani Mijačika / Ajla Tomljanović	2; 6	3; 6

== See also ==
- Fed Cup structure
