= 2011 Fed Cup Europe/Africa Zone Group I – Pool A =

Group A of the 2011 Fed Cup Europe/Africa Zone Group I was one of four pools in the Europe/Africa zone of the 2011 Fed Cup. Three teams competed in a round robin competition, with the top team and the bottom team proceeding to their respective sections of the play-offs: the top team played for advancement to the World Group II Play-offs, while the bottom team faced potential relegation to Group II.

		(Switzerland) SUI	(United Kingdom) GBR	(Denmark) DEN	RR; W–L	Set; W–L	Game; W–L	Standings
19	Switzerland		2–1	2–1	2–0	8–4	64–37	1
31	Great Britain	1–2		2–1	1–1	6–7	50–51	2
39	Denmark	1–2	1–2		0–2	5–8	48–63	3

== Switzerland vs. Great Britain ==
Switzerland
2
Municipal Tennis Club, Eilat, Israel
February 2, 2011
Hard (outdoors)

Great Britain
1

			1	2	3
1	(Switzerland) (United Kingdom)	Timea Bacsinszky; Heather Watson	6; 1	6; 3
2	(Switzerland) (United Kingdom)	Patty Schnyder; Anne Keothavong	6; 1	6; 2
3	(Switzerland) (United Kingdom)	Timea Bacsinszky / Amra Sadiković; Jocelyn Rae / Heather Watson	4; 6	3; 6

== Switzerland vs. Denmark ==
Switzerland
2
Municipal Tennis Club, Eilat, Israel
February 3, 2011
Hard (outdoors)

Denmark
1

			1	2	3
1	(Switzerland) (Denmark)	Timea Bacsinszky; Karen Barbat	6; 0	6; 1
2	(Switzerland) (Denmark)	Patty Schnyder; Caroline Wozniacki	3; 6	3; 6
3	(Switzerland) (Denmark)	Timea Bacsinszky / Patty Schnyder; Mai Grage / Caroline Wozniacki	6; 3	6; 2

== Denmark vs. Great Britain ==
Denmark
1
Municipal Tennis Club, Eilat, Israel
February 4, 2011
Hard (outdoors)

Great Britain
2

			1	2	3
1	(Denmark) (United Kingdom)	Karen Barbat; Heather Watson	0; 6	1; 6
2	(Denmark) (United Kingdom)	Caroline Wozniacki; Anne Keothavong	6; 0	6; 2
3	(Denmark) (United Kingdom)	Mai Grage / Caroline Wozniacki; Jocelyn Rae / Heather Watson	7; 5	5; 7	5; 7

== See also ==
- Fed Cup structure
