= Émilie Bacquet =

French tennis player

- Country (sports): France
- Born: 20 April 1984 (age 41)
- Turned pro: 2001
- Plays: Right (two-handed backhand)
- Prize money: $60,257

Singles
- Career record: 167–194
- Highest ranking: No. 413 (10 July 2006)

Doubles
- Career record: 140–137
- Career titles: 12 ITF
- Highest ranking: No. 254 (19 July 2010)

Émilie Bacquet (French pronunciation: [emili bakɛ]; born 20 April 1984) is a French former professional tennis player.

Her career-high WTA rankings are 413 in singles, achieved on 10 July 2006, and 254 in doubles, set on 19 July 2010.

Over her career, she won twelve titles at tournaments of the ITF Women's Circuit, all in doubles.

== ITF Circuit finals ==
$50,000 tournaments
$25,000 tournaments
$10,000 tournaments

=== Singles (0–4) ===
Result	No.	Date	Location	Surface	Opponent	Score
Loss	1.	10 April 2005	Makarska, Croatia	Clay	(Croatia) Sanja Ančić	4–6, 3–6
Loss	2.	13 November 2005	Le Havre, France	Clay (i)	(Belgium) Leslie Butkiewicz	5–7, 3–6
Loss	3.	28 November 2006	Cairo, Egypt	Clay	(Russia) Galina Fokina	2–6, 6–7^{(8)}
Loss	4.	13 July 2008	Brussels, Belgium	Clay	(Netherlands) Daniëlle Harmsen	1–6, 2–6

=== Doubles (12–12) ===
Result	No.	Date	Location	Surface	Partner	Opponents	Score
Loss	1.	16 January 2005	Grenoble, France	Hard (i)	(France) Anaïs Laurendon	(Bosnia and Herzegovina) Mervana Jugić-Salkić (Croatia) Darija Jurak	2–6, 2–6
Loss	2.	8 February 2005	Albufeira, Portugal	Hard	(France) Anaïs Laurendon	(Slovakia) Lenka Broosová (Slovakia) Jana Juricová	4–6, 6–2, 2–6
Loss	3.	3 July 2005	Mont de Marsan, France	Clay	(France) Violette Huck	(Argentina) Natalia Gussoni (Portugal) Frederica Piedade	1–6, 6–7^{(5)}
Loss	4.	13 November 2005	Le Havre, France	Clay (i)	(France) Louise Doutrelant	(Czech Republic) Janette Bejlková (Czech Republic) Renata Voráčová	3–6, 3–6
Win	5.	7 February 2006	Vale do Lobo, Portugal	Hard	(Netherlands) Chayenne Ewijk	(Romania) Liana Ungur (Turkey) İpek Şenoğlu	6–3, 6–3
Win	6.	13 February 2006	Albufeira, Portugal	Hard	(Netherlands) Chayenne Ewijk	(Slovenia) Polona Reberšak (Romania) Sorana Cîrstea	6–4, 6–4
Win	7.	7 May 2006	Rabat, Morocco	Clay	(Morocco) Bahia Mouhtassine	(Romania) Raluca Olaru (Bolivia) María Fernanda Álvarez Terán	w/o
Win	8.	30 May 2006	Tortosa, Spain	Clay	(Morocco) Bahia Mouhtassine	(France) Laura Thorpe (Spain) Irene Rehberger Bescos	1–6, 6–4, 7–6^{(5)}
Win	9.	15 August 2006	Koksijde, Belgium	Clay	(Belgium) Valerie Verhamme	(Belgium) Debbrich Feys (Belgium) Jessie de Vries	7–6^{(3)}, 7–6^{(3)}
Loss	10.	27 August 2006	Westende, Belgium	Hard	(Belgium) Leslie Butkiewicz	(France) Celine Cattaneo (France) Claire de Gubernatis	6–7^{(4)}, 3–6
Loss	11.	12 November 2006	Le Havre, France	Clay (i)	(Belgium) Valerie Verhamme	(Netherlands) Claire Lablans (Netherlands) Marcella Koek	1–6, 4–6
Win	12.	28 November 2006	Cairo, Egypt	Clay	(Poland) Olga Brózda	(Russia) Vasilisa Davydova (Russia) Varvara Galanina	6–1, 6–3
Loss	13.	20 April 2007	Hvar, Croatia	Clay	(Serbia) Karolina Jovanović	(Romania) Mihaela Buzărnescu (Poland) Magdalena Kiszczyńska	4–6, 2–6
Win	14.	24 June 2007	Montpellier, France	Clay	(France) Nadege Vergos	(Belarus) Tatsiana Kapshay (Ukraine) Kateryna Polunina	5–7, 6–4, 6–3
Win	15.	12 August 2007	Rebecq, Belgium	Clay	(France) Samantha Schoeffel	(Netherlands) Claire Lablans (Netherlands) Marcella Koek	7–6^{(6)}, 6–7^{(3)}, 6–4
Win	16.	19 August 2007	Koksijde, Belgium	Clay	(France) Samantha Schoeffel	(Poland) Sylwia Zagórska (Poland) Olga Brózda	6–1, 6–1
Win	17.	10 September 2007	Casale Monferrato, Italy	Clay	(France) Samantha Schoeffel	(Italy) Stefania Chieppa (Italy) Giulia Gatto-Monticone	6–2, 6–2
Loss	18.	15 October 2007	Dubrovnik, Croatia	Clay	(France) Samantha Schoeffel	(Serbia) Nataša Zorić (Serbia) Miljana Adanko	3–6, 3–6
Win	19.	24 February 2008	Portimão, Portugal	Hard	(Netherlands) Chayenne Ewijk	(Russia) Elena Chalova (Armenia) Liudmila Nikoyan	w/o
Loss	20.	4 August 2008	Rebecq, Belgium	Clay	(Netherlands) Marcella Koek	(Belgium) Sofie Oyen (Poland) Aleksandra Grela	3–6, 2–6
Loss	21.	28 September 2008	Sofia, Bulgaria	Clay	(Bulgaria) Dessislava Mladenova	(Ukraine) Mariya Malkhasyan (Ukraine) Oksana Pavlova	2–6, 1–6
Loss	22.	21 August 2009	Westende, Belgium	Hard	(Germany) Jasmin Wöhr	(Russia) Vasilisa Davydova (Georgia (country)) Margalita Chakhnashvili	2–6, 5–7
Loss	23.	17 October 2009	Dubrovnik, Croatia	Clay	(Serbia) Nataša Zorić	(Slovakia) Michaela Hončová (Slovakia) Karin Morgosová	4–6, 6–3, [6–10]
Win	24.	8 August 2010	Rebecq, Belgium	Clay	(France) Myrtille Georges	(Netherlands) Kika Hogendoorn (Belgium) Elke Lemmens	6–3, 4–6, [11–9]
