= Virág Németh =

Hungarian tennis player

- Country (sports): Hungary
- Born: 19 June 1985 (age 39); Zalaegerszeg, Hungary
- Height: 1.72 m (5 ft 8 in)
- Turned pro: 2001
- Retired: 2010
- Plays: Right-handed (two-handed backhand)
- Prize money: $76,455

Singles
- Career record: 121–68
- Career titles: 8 ITF
- Highest ranking: No. 130 (22 November 2004)

Grand Slam singles results
- French Open: Q1 (2004, 2005)
- Wimbledon: Q2 (2005)
- US Open: Q1 (2004)

Doubles
- Career record: 47–27
- Career titles: 5 ITF
- Highest ranking: No. 177 (7 February 2005)

Virág Németh (born 19 June 1985) is a former professional tennis player from Hungary.

She won eight singles and five doubles titles on the ITF Circuit and reached one WTA Tour doubles final, in Budapest in 2004, partnering with Ágnes Szávay, losing to Petra Mandula and Barbara Schett.

== WTA career finals ==
=== Doubles: 1 (runner-up) ===
Result	Date	Tournament	Tier	Surface	Partner	Opponents	Score
Loss	Jul 2004	Budapest Grand Prix, Hungary	Tier IV	Clay	(Hungary) Ágnes Szávay	(Hungary) Petra Mandula (Austria) Barbara Schett	3–6, 2–6

== ITF Circuit finals ==
$100,000 tournaments
$75,000 tournaments
$50,000 tournaments
$25,000 tournaments
$10,000 tournaments

=== Singles: 13 (8 titles, 5 runner-ups) ===
Result	No.	Date	Tournament	Surface	Opponent	Score
Loss	1.	23 April 2002	ITF Taranto, Italy	Clay	(Germany) Sandra Klösel	4–6, 6–1, 4–6
Win	2.	9 February 2003	ITF Bergamo, Italy	Hard (i)	(Italy) Alberta Brianti	7–5, 5–7, 7–6
Win	3.	21 April 2002	ITF Taranto, Italy	Clay	(Spain) Rosa María Andrés Rodríguez	3–6, 6–7, 1–6
Win	4.	4 May 2003	ITF Pula, Croatia	Clay	(Czech Republic) Lucie Hradecká	4–6, 6–0, 6–1
Loss	5.	29 September 2003	ITF Caserta, Italy	Clay	(Bosnia and Herzegovina) Mervana Jugić-Salkić	6–7, 3–1 ret.
Loss	6.	2 February 2004	ITF Ortisei, Italy	Carpet (i)	(Czech Republic) Iveta Melzer	3–6, 1–6
Win	7.	13 September 2004	ITF Sofia, Bulgaria	Clay	(Slovakia) Zuzana Kučová	5–1 ret.
Win	8.	3 October 2004	ITF Belgrade, Serbia	Clay	(Russia) Ekaterina Bychkova	2–6, 6–2, 6–2
Win	9.	31 October 2004	ITF Istanbul, Turkey	Hard (i)	(Turkey) İpek Şenoğlu	7–5, 6–4
Win	10.	30 May 2006	ITF Győr, Hungary	Clay	(Romania) Antonia Xenia Tout	6–2, 6–3
Loss	11.	4 September 2007	ITF Brčko, Bosnia & Herzegovina	Clay	(Slovenia) Diana Nakič	3–6, 4–6
Loss	12.	14 June 2009	ITF Budapest, Hungary	Clay	(Serbia) Nataša Zorić	6–4, 6–7, 4–6
Win	13.	5 July 2009	ITF Prokuplje, Serbia	Clay	(Serbia) Karolina Jovanović	6–4, 2–6, 7–5

=== Doubles: 9 (5 titles, 4 runner-ups) ===
Result	No.	Date	Tournament	Surface	Partner	Opponents	Score
Win	1.	13 September 2004	ITF Sofia, Bulgaria	Clay	(Hungary) Kira Nagy	(Romania) Gabriela Niculescu (Czech Republic) Sandra Záhlavová	2–6, 6–2, 7–5
Loss	2.	19 October 2004	ITF Seville, Spain	Clay	(Hungary) Kira Nagy	(Spain) Lourdes Domínguez Lino (Spain) Laura Pous Tió	2–6, 3–6
Win	3.	21 November 2004	ITF Deauville, France	Clay	(Israel) Tzipora Obziler	(Germany) Vanessa Henke (Czech Republic) Květa Peschke	6–4, 6–1
Win	4.	30 May 2006	ITF Győr, Hungary	Clay	(Hungary) Csilla Borsányi	(Slovakia) Nikola Vajdová (Slovakia) Patrícia Verešová	6–4, 6–4
Win	5.	23 June 2008	ITF Budapest, Hungary	Clay	(New Zealand) Shona Lee	(Hungary) Palma Kiraly (Slovakia) Monika Kochanová	6–2, 6–2
Loss	6.	5 July 2008	ITF Prokuplje, Serbia	Clay	(Hungary) Aleksandra Filipovski	(Serbia) Ljubica Avramović (Serbia) Karolina Jovanović	6–7^{(4)}, 4–6
Loss	7.	1 September 2008	ITF Brčko, Bosnia & Herzegovina	Clay	(Hungary) Aleksandra Filipovski	(Slovakia) Katarína Poljaková (Slovakia) Zuzana Zlochová	1–6, 6–1, [8–10]
Runner-up	8.	4 July 2009	ITF Prokuplje, Serbia	Clay	(Hungary) Aleksandra Filipovski	(Serbia) Karolina Jovanović (Slovenia) Tina Obrež	7–6^{(4)}, 1–6, [14–16]
Win	9.	7 September 2009	ITF Budapest, Hungary	Clay	(Hungary) Réka Luca Jani	(Czech Republic) Jana Jandová (Czech Republic) Lucie Kriegsmannová	4–6, 6–3, [10–6]
