= Sofie Oyen =

Belgian tennis player

- Country (sports): Belgium
- Born: 4 February 1992 (age 33) Leopoldsburg, Belgium
- Height: 1.60 m (5 ft 3 in)
- Plays: Right (two-handed backhand)
- Prize money: $36,938

Singles
- Career record: 155–93
- Career titles: 3 ITF
- Highest ranking: No. 403 (23 August 2010)

Doubles
- Career record: 53–42
- Career titles: 3 ITF
- Highest ranking: No. 526 (21 December 2015)

Sofie Oyen (born 4 February 1992) is a Belgian former tennis player.

In her career, Leopoldsburg-born Oyen won three singles titles and three doubles titles on the ITF Women's Circuit. On 23 August 2010, she reached her best singles ranking of world No. 403. On 21 December 2015, she peaked at No. 526 in the WTA doubles rankings.

Oyen played for Belgium at the Fed Cup in 2009 and 2010, and has a win–loss record of 0–2.

== ITF Circuit finals ==
=== Singles (3–5) ===
Legend $25,000 tournaments $10/15,000 tournaments	Finals by surface Hard (1–0) Clay (2–5)

Outcome	No.	Date	Tournament	Surface	Opponent	Score
Runner-up	1.	18 July 2010	Zwevegem, Belgium	Clay	(Belgium) Maryna Zanevska	6–7^{(4–7)}, 1–6
Runner-up	2.	24 July 2010	Knokke, Belgium	Clay	(Netherlands) Angelique van der Meet	2–6, 0–6
Winner	1.	8 August 2010	Rebecq, Belgium	Clay	(Italy) Annalisa Bona	4–6, 7–6^{(7–5)}, 6–2
Runner-up	3.	24 August 2014	Wanfercée-Baulet, Belgium	Clay	(Sweden) Hilda Melander	6–3, 3–6, 2–6
Winner	2.	1 March 2015	Mâcon, France	Hard (i)	(France) Céline Ghesquière	2–6, 6–3, 7–6^{(7–5)}
Runner-up	4.	11 July 2015	Knokke, Belgium	Clay	(Russia) Polina Leykina	4–6, 2–6
Winner	3.	19 July 2015	Nieuwpoort, Belgium	Clay	(Belgium) Greet Minnen	6–2, 6–1
Runner-up	5.	27 March 2016	Le Havre, France	Clay (i)	(Italy) Martina Di Giuseppe	3–6, 0–6

=== Doubles (3–4) ===
Legend $25,000 tournaments $10,000 tournaments	Finals by surface Hard (0–1) Clay (3–3)

Outcome	No.	Date	Tournament	Surface	Partner	Opponents	Score
Winner	1.	10 August 2008	Rebecq, Belgium	Clay	(Poland) Aleksandra Grela	(France) Émilie Bacquet (Netherlands) Marcella Koek	6–3, 6–2
Runner-up	1.	16 May 2009	Antalya, Turkey	Clay	(Belgium) An-Sophie Mestach	(United Kingdom) Amanda Carreras (Italy) Valentina Sulpizio	6–4, 3–6, [4–10]
Winner	2.	31 July 2010	Bree, Belgium	Clay	(Netherlands) Demi Schuurs	(Netherlands) Marcella Koek (Russia) Marina Melnikova	6–0, 6–1
Runner-up	2.	18 July 2013	Knokke, Belgium	Clay	(Belgium) Elke Lemmens	(Japan) Mana Ayukawa (Netherlands) Monique Zuur	2–6, 6–4, [8–10]
Runner-up	3.	18 July 2014	Knokke, Belgium	Clay	(Belgium) Justine De Sutter	(Spain) Aliona Bolsova (Chile) Cecilia Costa Melgar	6–4, 3–6, [4–10]
Winner	3.	6 September 2014	Bol, Croatia	Clay	(Belgium) Justine De Sutter	(Germany) Anna Klasen (Germany) Charlotte Klasen	3–6, 7–6^{(7–4)}, [10–7]
Runner-up	4.	17 October 2015	Port El Kantaoui, Tunisia	Hard	(India) Kyra Shroff	(Bosnia and Herzegovina) Jelena Simić (Ukraine) Valeriya Strakhova	3–6, 4–6

== Fed Cup participation ==
=== Doubles (0–2) ===
Edition	Stage	Date	Location	Against	Surface	Partner	Opponents	W/L	Score
2009 Fed Cup; World Group II	WG2	8 February 2009	Bratislava, Slovakia	Slovakia	Hard (i)	(Belgium) Tamaryn Hendler	(Slovakia) Magdaléna Rybáriková (Slovakia) Lenka Wienerová	L	4–6, 4–6
2010 Fed Cup; World Group II	WG2	7 February 2010	Bydgoszcz, Poland	Poland	Hard (i)	(Belgium) An-Sophie Mestach	(Poland) Klaudia Jans (Poland) Alicja Rosolska	L	3–6, 6–3, 1–6
