= Réka Luca Jani =

Hungarian tennis player (born 1991)

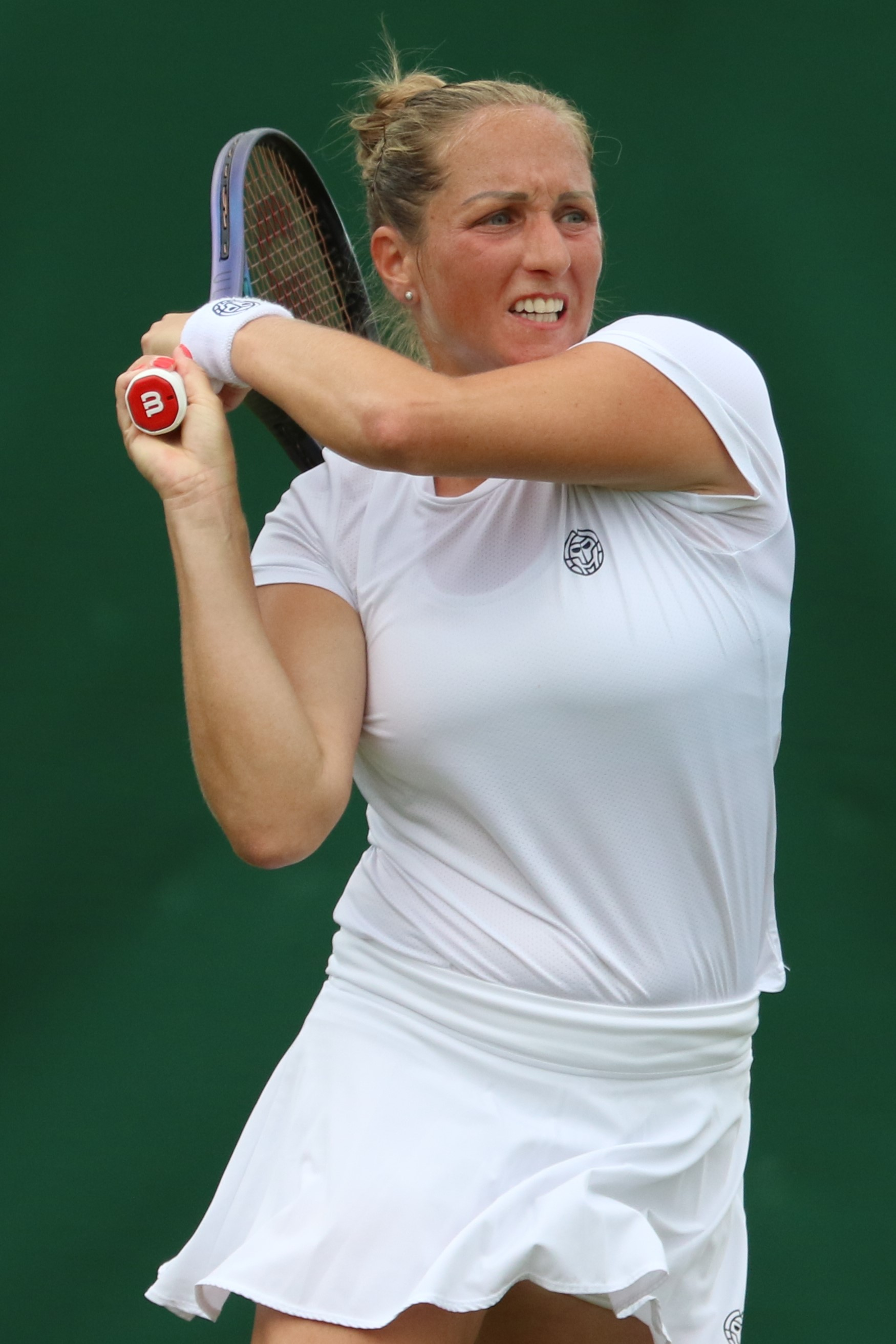
- Jani at the 2023 Wimbledon Championships
- Country (sports): Hungary
- Residence: Sopron, Hungary
- Born: 31 July 1991 (age 35) Siófok, Hungary
- Height: 1.61 m (5 ft 3 in)
- Turned pro: 2008
- Retired: 2024
- Plays: Right (two-handed backhand)
- Prize money: $861,407

Singles
- Career record: 548–362
- Career titles: 25 ITF
- Highest ranking: No. 104 (19 September 2022)

Grand Slam singles results
- Australian Open: Q2 (2012)
- French Open: 1R (2022)
- Wimbledon: Q2 (2022, 2023)
- US Open: 1R (2011)

Doubles
- Career record: 366–215
- Career titles: 34 ITF
- Highest ranking: No. 124 (22 August 2016)

Other doubles tournaments
- Olympic Games: 1R (2016)

Team competitions
- Fed Cup: 30–22

Réka Luca Jani (born 31 July 1991) is a Hungarian former professional tennis player.

She has won 25 singles titles and 34 doubles titles on the ITF Women's World Tennis Tour. On 19 September 2022, she reached her best singles ranking of world No. 104. On 22 August 2016, she peaked at No. 124 in the doubles rankings. Her favorite surface is clay.

Playing for Hungary Billie Jean King Cup team, Jani has a win–loss record of 30–22.

== Early life ==
Parents are Janos, Szilvia and Zsolt; brothers are Mate and Balint, sister is Petra.

== Career ==
Jani who began playing at age six, reached the first final on the WTA Tour in 2016, at the Brasil Tennis Cup partnering Tímea Babos.

She was awarded a wildcard entry to the 2016 Summer Olympics in Rio de Janeiro, along with Tímea Babos to play in women's doubles.

Jani made her Grand Slam tournament main-draw debut at the 2011 US Open, losing to wildcard Sloane Stephens in the first round.

Jani reached her first-ever WTA Tour quarterfinal at the 2021 Serbia Open defeating Anna Kalinskaya. As a result, she returned to the top 200 in singles.

On 9 May 2022, she reached a new career-high in singles of world No. 129, after reaching the quarterfinals in Chiasso, Switzerland ($60k), the final of the $60k Zagreb (lost to Jule Niemeier), Croatia, and quarterfinals of the $60k Prague tournaments.

After an 11-year gap, Jani made it back into a Grand Slam tournament main draw at the 2022 French Open when she made it through the qualifying rounds as a lucky loser. She lost to 14th seed Belinda Bencic in the first round.

Partnering with Panna Udvardy, she was runner-up at the WTA 125 2022 Iași Open, losing to Darya Astakhova and Andreea Roșca in the final which went to a deciding champions tiebreak.

Jani made her first WTA 125 singles final at the 2022 Țiriac Foundation Trophy, defeating Andreea Roșca in the semifinals. She lost the championship match to second seed Irina-Camelia Begu.

In July 2024, Jani announced her retirement from professional tennis.

== Performance timelines ==
Key
| W | F | SF | QF | #R | RR | Q# | P# | DNQ | A | Z# | PO | G | S | B | NMS | NTI | P | NH |

(W) winner; (F) finalist; (SF) semifinalist; (QF) quarterfinalist; (#R) rounds 4, 3, 2, 1; (RR) round-robin stage; (Q#) qualification round; (P#) preliminary round; (DNQ) did not qualify; (A) absent; (Z#) Davis/Fed Cup Zonal Group (with number indication) or (PO) play-off; (G) gold, (S) silver or (B) bronze Olympic/Paralympic medal; (NMS) not a Masters tournament; (NTI) not a Tier I tournament; (P) postponed; (NH) not held; (SR) strike rate (events won / competed); (W–L) win–loss record.
To avoid confusion and double counting, these charts are updated at the conclusion of a tournament or when the player's participation has ended.

=== Singles ===
Current through the 2023 French Open.

| Tournament | 2011 | 2012 | 2013 | 2014 | 2015 | 2016 | 2017 | 2018 | 2019 | 2020 | 2021 | 2022 | 2023 | SR | W–L |
|---|---|---|---|---|---|---|---|---|---|---|---|---|---|---|---|
Grand Slam tournaments
| Australian Open | A | Q2 | A | A | A | A | A | A | A | Q1 | Q1 | Q1 | Q1 | 0 / 0 | 0–0 |
| French Open | A | Q1 | A | A | A | A | A | A | A | Q1 | Q1 | 1R | Q2 | 0 / 1 | 0–1 |
| Wimbledon | A | Q1 | A | A | A | A | A | A | A | NH | Q1 | Q2 | Q2 | 0 / 0 | 0–0 |
| US Open | 1R | Q1 | A | A | Q1 | A | A | A | A | A | Q3 | Q2 | Q1 | 0 / 1 | 0–1 |
| Win–loss | 0–1 | 0–0 | 0–0 | 0–0 | 0–0 | 0–0 | 0–0 | 0–0 | 0–0 | 0–0 | 0–0 | 0–1 | 0–0 | 0 / 2 | 0–2 |
WTA 1000
| Dubai / Qatar Open (Note: The first Premier 5 event of the year has switched back and forth between the Dubai Tennis Championships and the Qatar Ladies Open since 2009. Dubai was classified as a Premier 5 event from 2009 to 2011 before being succeeded by Doha for the 2012–2014 period. In 2015, Dubai regained its Premier 5 status while Doha was demoted to Premier status. The Premier 5 tournaments were reclassified as WTA 1000 tournaments in 2021.) | A | A | A | A | A | A | A | A | A | A | A | A | Q1 | 0 / 0 | 0–0 |
| Indian Wells Open | A | A | A | A | A | A | A | A | A | NH | A | Q1 | Q1 | 0 / 0 | 0–0 |
| Miami Open | A | A | A | A | A | A | A | A | A | NH | A | A | Q1 | 0 / 0 | 0–0 |
| Madrid Open | A | A | A | A | A | A | A | A | A | NH | A | A | Q1 | 0 / 0 | 0–0 |
Career statistics
| Tournaments | 2 | 0 | 1 | 0 | 1 | 2 | 0 | 1 | 1 | 0 | 3 | 5 | 1 | Career total: 17 | |
| Overall win-loss | 0–2 | 0–0 | 0–1 | 0–0 | 0–1 | 1–2 | 0–0 | 1–1 | 1–1 | 0–0 | 3–3 | 1–5 | 0–1 | 0 / 17 | 7–17 |
| Year-end ranking | 162 | 329 | 247 | 315 | 212 | 229 | 811 | 311 | 189 | 207 | 168 | 111 | 319 | $861,407 | |

== WTA Tour finals ==
=== Doubles: 1 (runner-up) ===
| Legend WTA 250 (0–1) | Finals by surface Hard (0–1) |

| Result | Date | Tournament | Tier | Surface | Partner | Opponents | Score |
|---|---|---|---|---|---|---|---|
| Loss | Aug 2016 | Brasil Tennis Cup, Brazil | International (Note: The WTA International tournaments were reclassified as WTA 250 tournaments in 2021.) | Hard | (Hungary) Tímea Babos | (Ukraine) Lyudmyla Kichenok (Ukraine) Nadiia Kichenok | 3–6, 1–6 |

== WTA 125 finals ==
=== Singles: 1 (runner-up) ===
| Result | Date | Tournament | Surface | Opponent | Score |
|---|---|---|---|---|---|
| Loss | Sep 2022 | Open Romania Ladies | Clay | (Romania) Irina-Camelia Begu | 3–6, 3–6 |

=== Doubles: 3 (3 runner-ups) ===
| Result | W–L | Date | Tournament | Surface | Partner | Opponents | Score |
|---|---|---|---|---|---|---|---|
| Loss | 0–1 | Dec 2021 | Korea Open, South Korea | Hard (i) | (Greece) Valentini Grammatikopoulou | (South Korea) Choi Ji-hee (South Korea) Han Na-lae | 4–6, 4–6 |
| Loss | 0–2 | Aug 2022 | Iași Open, Romania | Clay | (Hungary) Panna Udvardy | Darya Astakhova (Romania) Andreea Roșca | 5–7, 7–5, [7–10] |
| Loss | 0–3 | Sep 2022 | Open Romania Ladies | Clay | (Hungary) Panna Udvardy | (Spain) Aliona Bolsova (Venezuela) Andrea Gámiz | 5–7, 3–6 |

== ITF Circuit finals ==
=== Singles: 42 (25 titles, 17 runner-ups) ===
| Legend $100,000 tournaments $60,000 tournaments $25,000 tournaments $10/15,000 tournaments | Finals by surface Hard (2–1) Clay (23–15) Carpet (0–1) |

| Result | W–L | Date | Tournament | Tier | Surface | Opponent | Score |
|---|---|---|---|---|---|---|---|
| Loss | 0–1 | Sep 2008 | ITF Sofia, Bulgaria | 10,000 | Clay | (Ukraine) Alyona Sotnikova | 2–6, 6–4, 3–6 |
| Loss | 0–2 | Jun 2009 | ITF Kristinehamn, Sweden | 25,000 | Clay | (Georgia (country)) Anna Tatishvili | 1–6, 5–7 |
| Win | 1–2 | Sep 2009 | ITF Budapest, Hungary | 10,000 | Clay | (Czech Republic) Lucie Kriegsmannová | 7–6^{(3)}, 6–2 |
| Win | 2–2 | Sep 2009 | Telavi Open, Georgia | 25,000 | Clay | (Austria) Melanie Klaffner | 6–2, 6–4 |
| Loss | 2–3 | Oct 2009 | ITF Dubrovnik, Croatia | 10,000 | Clay | (Croatia) Matea Mezak | 6–0, 5–7, 6–7^{(4)} |
| Win | 3–3 | Aug 2010 | ITF Vinkovci, Croatia | 10,000 | Clay | (Czech Republic) Zuzana Linhová | 6–2, 6–4 |
| Loss | 3–4 | Aug 2010 | ITF Osijek, Croatia | 10,000 | Clay | (Switzerland) Conny Perrin | 6–7^{(10)}, 6–4, 1–6 |
| Loss | 3–5 | Mar 2011 | ITF Antalya, Turkey | 10,000 | Clay | (Romania) Cristina Dinu | 3–6, 4–6 |
| Win | 4–5 | Mar 2011 | ITF Antalya, Turkey | 10,000 | Clay | (Spain) Garbiñe Muguruza | 6–2, 6–1 |
| Win | 5–5 | May 2011 | Zubr Cup, Czech Republic | 25,000 | Clay | (Czech Republic) Karolína Plíšková | 6–0, 6–3 |
| Win | 6–5 | Aug 2011 | ITF Istanbul, Turkey | 10,000 | Hard | (Germany) Christina Shakovets | 6–4, 6–1 |
| Loss | 6–6 | Sep 2011 | ITF Tbilisi, Georgia | 25,000 | Clay | (Ukraine) Lesia Tsurenko | 6–7^{(3)}, 3–6 |
| Win | 7–6 | Oct 2011 | ITF Sant Cugat del Vallès, Spain | 25,000 | Clay | (Georgia (country)) Margalita Chakhnashvili | 6–4, 6–2 |
| Win | 8–6 | Oct 2011 | ITF Seville, Spain | 25,000 | Clay | (Spain) Estrella Cabeza Candela | 2–6, 6–3, 6–3 |
| Win | 9–6 | Jan 2013 | ITF Antalya, Turkey | 10,000 | Clay | (Netherlands) Marrit Boonstra | 6–1, 1–6, 7–6^{(4)} |
| Win | 10–6 | Jan 2013 | ITF Antalya, Turkey | 10,000 | Clay | (Georgia (country)) Sofia Kvatsabaia | 6–0, 6–1 |
| Loss | 10–7 | Jan 2013 | ITF Antalya, Turkey | 10,000 | Clay | (Romania) Alexandra Dulgheru | 2–6, 2–6 |
| Win | 11–7 | Mar 2013 | ITF Madrid, Spain | 10,000 | Clay | (Ukraine) Sofiya Kovalets | 6–1, 6–0 |
| Win | 12–7 | Mar 2013 | ITF Madrid, Spain | 10,000 | Clay | (United States) Bernarda Pera | 2–6, 6–4, 6–4 |
| Win | 13–7 | Jul 2013 | Zubr Cup, Czech Republic | 15,000 | Clay | (Russia) Ekaterina Alexandrova | 6–2, 7–6^{(4)} |
| Win | 14–7 | Jul 2013 | Palić Open, Serbia | 10,000 | Clay | (Serbia) Milana Špremo | 6–0, 6–3 |
| Win | 15–7 | Jul 2013 | ITF Bad Saulgau, Germany | 25,000 | Clay | (Austria) Patricia Mayr-Achleitner | 7–6^{(4)}, 6–3 |
| Win | 16–7 | Aug 2013 | ITF Prague, Czech Republic | 10,000 | Clay | (Czech Republic) Zuzana Zálabská | 7–5, 6–1 |
| Loss | 16–8 | Feb 2014 | AK Ladies Open, Germany | 15,000 | Carpet (i) | (Belarus) Iryna Shymanovich | 1–6, 6–7^{(3)} |
| Win | 17–8 | Oct 2014 | ITF Heraklion, Greece | 10,000 | Hard | (Austria) Barbara Haas | 4–6, 6–3, 7–6^{(6)} |
| Win | 18–8 | Nov 2014 | ITF Antalya, Turkey | 10,000 | Clay | (Georgia (country)) Ekaterine Gorgodze | 6–4, 6–0 |
| Loss | 18–9 | Feb 2015 | ITF Trnava, Slovakia | 10,000 | Hard (i) | (Latvia) Anastasija Sevastova | 1–6, 6–7^{(3–7)} |
| Loss | 18–10 | Mar 2015 | ITF Antalya, Turkey | 10,000 | Clay | (Romania) Cristina Dinu | 6–2, 4–6, 2–6 |
| Win | 19–10 | Apr 2015 | Chiasso Open, Switzerland | 25,000 | Clay | (Romania) Alexandra Cadanțu | 3–6, 6–3, 7–6^{(6)} |
| Loss | 19–11 | Jun 2015 | ITF Padova, Italy | 25,000 | Clay | (Argentina) Paula Ormaechea | 3–6, 4–6 |
| Loss | 19–12 | Jun 2016 | ITF Rome, Italy | 25,000 | Clay | (Slovakia) Rebecca Šramková | 1–6, 1–6 |
| Loss | 19–13 | Sep 2017 | ITF Székesfehérvár, Hungary | 15,000 | Clay | (Hungary) Panna Udvardy | 5–7, 3–6 |
| Loss | 19–14 | Oct 2017 | ITF Heraklion, Greece | 15,000 | Clay | (Hungary) Anna Bondár | 2–6, 3–6 |
| Win | 20–14 | Nov 2017 | ITF Heraklion, Greece | 15,000 | Clay | (Hungary) Anna Bondár | 6–0, 6–3 |
| Win | 21–14 | Mar 2018 | ITF Heraklion, Greece | 15,000 | Clay | (Spain) Rosa Vicens Mas | 6–4, 7–5 |
| Win | 22–14 | Jul 2019 | ITF Baja, Hungary | W25 | Clay | (Egypt) Mayar Sherif | 6–3, 2–6, 6–2 |
| Loss | 22–15 | Sep 2019 | Zagreb Ladies Open, Croatia | W60+H | Clay | (Ukraine) Maryna Chernyshova | 1–6, 4–6 |
| Loss | 22–16 | Sep 2019 | ITF Sankt Pölten, Austria | W25 | Clay | (Argentina) Paula Ormaechea | 6–2, 3–6, 3–6 |
| Win | 23–16 | Oct 2021 | ITF Budapest, Hungary | W25 | Clay | (Italy) Giulia Gatto-Monticone | 6–1, 6–4 |
| Win | 24–16 | Feb 2022 | ITF Antalya, Turkey | W25 | Clay | (China) Wang Yafan | 6–4, 6–3 |
| Loss | 24–17 | Apr 2022 | Zagreb Ladies Open, Croatia | W60 | Clay | (Germany) Jule Niemeier | 2–6, 2–6 |
| Win | 25–17 | Sep 2022 | Prague Open, Czech Republic | W60 | Clay | (Germany) Noma Noha Akugue | 6–3, 7–6 |

=== Doubles: 67 (34 titles, 33 runner-ups) ===
| Legend $100,000 tournaments (0–2) $50/60,000 tournaments (2–6) $25,000 tournaments (17–17) $10/15,000 tournaments (15–8) | Finals by surface Hard (4–2) Clay (30–30) Grass (0–1) |

| Result | W–L | Date | Tournament | Tier | Surface | Partner | Opponents | Score |
|---|---|---|---|---|---|---|---|---|
| Loss | 0–1 | Oct 2008 | ITF Dubrovnik, Croatia | 10k | Clay | (Hungary) Aleksandra Filipovski | (Czech Republic) Lucie Kriegsmannová (Czech Republic) Darina Šeděnková | 2–6, 2–6 |
| Win | 1–1 | Apr 2009 | ITF Hvar, Croatia | 10k | Clay | (Czech Republic) Martina Kubičíková | (Romania) Elena Bogdan (Czech Republic) Martina Borecká | 6–4, 0–6, [10–6] |
| Win | 2–1 | Sep 2009 | ITF Budapest, Hungary | 10k | Clay | (Hungary) Virág Németh | (Czech Republic) Jana Jandová (Czech Republic) Lucie Kriegsmannová | 4–6, 6–3, [10–6] |
| Win | 3–1 | Sep 2009 | ITF Tbilisi, Georgia | 25k | Clay | (Ukraine) Veronika Kapshay | (Georgia (country)) Tatia Mikadze (Georgia (country)) Manana Shapakidze | 7–5, 0–6, [10–8] |
| Win | 4–1 | Oct 2009 | ITF Dubrovnik, Croatia | 10k | Clay | (Switzerland) Conny Perrin | (Croatia) Matea Čutura (Croatia) Dorotea Kraljević | 6–2, 6–3 |
| Win | 5–1 | Aug 2010 | ITF Vinkovci, Croatia | 10k | Clay | (Romania) Raluca Elena Platon | (Croatia) Indire Akiki (Czech Republic) Zuzana Linhová | 6–3, 6–0 |
| Win | 6–1 | Aug 2010 | ITF Osijek, Croatia | 10k | Clay | (Czech Republic) Martina Kubičíková | (Croatia) Petra Šunić (Serbia) Nataša Zorić | 6–1, 6–1 |
| Loss | 6–2 | Oct 2010 | ITF Ain Sukhna, Egypt | 10k | Clay | (Czech Republic) Martina Kubičíková | (Czech Republic) Lucie Kriegsmannová (Czech Republic) Iveta Gerlová | 3–6, 6–3, [8–10] |
| Win | 7–2 | Oct 2010 | ITF Cairo, Egypt | 25k | Clay | (Czech Republic) Martina Kubičíková | (Liechtenstein) Stephanie Vogt (Slovenia) Maša Zec Peškirič | 6–7^{(4)}, 6–1, [11–9] |
| Loss | 7–3 | Feb 2011 | ITF Mallorca, Spain | 10k | Clay | (Switzerland) Conny Perrin | (Netherlands) Daniëlle Harmsen (Germany) Scarlett Werner | 4–6, 3–6 |
| Loss | 7–4 | Mar 2011 | ITF Antalya, Turkey | 10k | Clay | (Czech Republic) Martina Kubičíková | (Turkey) Pemra Özgen (Poland) Sandra Zaniewska | 6–2, 5–7, [6–10] |
| Win | 8–4 | Apr 2011 | ITF Civitavecchia, Italy | 25k | Clay | (Netherlands) Daniëlle Harmsen | (Romania) Diana Enache (Romania) Liana Ungur | 6–2, 6–3 |
| Loss | 8–5 | Jun 2011 | Zlín Open, Czech Republic | 50k | Clay | (Hungary) Katalin Marosi | (Ukraine) Yuliya Beygelzimer (Georgia (country)) Margalita Chakhnashvili | 6–3, 1–6, [8–10] |
| Loss | 8–6 | Jun 2011 | ITF Padova, Italy | 25k | Clay | (Ukraine) Irina Buryachok | (France) Kristina Mladenovic (Poland) Katarzyna Piter | 4–6, 3–6 |
| Win | 9–6 | Sep 2011 | ITF Tbilisi, Georgia | 25k | Clay | (Ukraine) Irina Buryachok | (Romania) Elena Bogdan (Chile) Andrea Koch Benvenuto | 7–6^{(3)}, 6–2 |
| Win | 10–6 | Feb 2012 | ITF Rabat, Morocco | 25k | Clay | (Slovakia) Jana Čepelová | (Italy) Anastasia Grymalska (Belarus) Ilona Kremen | 6–7^{(4)}, 6–1, [10–4] |
| Loss | 10–7 | Jun 2012 | Nottingham Open, UK | 50k | Grass | (Portugal) Maria João Koehler | (Australia) Ashleigh Barty (Australia) Sally Peers | 6–7^{(2)}, 6–3, [5–10] |
| Loss | 10–8 | Jul 2012 | Versmold Open, Germany | 50k | Clay | (Romania) Elena Bogdan | (Argentina) Mailen Auroux (Argentina) María Irigoyen | 1–6, 4–6 |
| Loss | 10–9 | Jul 2012 | ITF Aschaffenburg, Germany | 25k | Clay | (Denmark) Malou Ejdesgaard | (Argentina) Florencia Molinero (Liechtenstein) Stephanie Vogt | 3–6, 6–7^{(3)} |
| Win | 11–9 | Jul 2012 | ITF Bad Waltersdorf, Austria | 10k | Clay | (Germany) Christina Shakovets | (Australia) Alexandra Nancarrow (Austria) Katharina Negrin | 6–2, 6–0 |
| Loss | 11–10 | Sep 2012 | Save Cup Mestre, Italy | 50k | Clay | (Serbia) Teodora Mirčić | (Argentina) Mailen Auroux (Argentina) María Irigoyen | 7–5, 4–6, [8–10] |
| Win | 12–10 | Sep 2012 | Telavi Open, Georgia | 50k | Clay | (Germany) Christina Shakovets | (Belarus) Ekaterina Dzehalevich (Georgia (country)) Oksana Kalashnikova | 3–6, 6–4, [10–6] |
| Win | 13–10 | Feb 2013 | ITF Mallorca, Spain | 10k | Clay | (Spain) Leticia Costas | (Italy) Anastasia Grymalska (Russia) Yana Sizikova | 6–3, 6–2 |
| Win | 14–10 | Feb 2013 | ITF Mallorca, Spain | 10k | Clay | (Spain) Leticia Costas | (Spain) Lucía Cervera Vázquez (Spain) Carolina Prats Millán | 6–2, 6–1 |
| Win | 15–10 | Apr 2013 | ITF La Marsa, Tunisia | 25k | Clay | (Russia) Eugeniya Pashkova | (Montenegro) Danka Kovinić (Brazil) Laura Pigossi | 6–3, 4–6, [10–5] |
| Loss | 15–11 | Apr 2013 | Nana Trophy, Tunisia | 25k | Clay | (Russia) Eugeniya Pashkova | (Serbia) Aleksandra Krunić (Poland) Katarzyna Piter | 2–6, 6–3, [7–10] |
| Loss | 15–12 | Jun 2013 | Internazionali di Brescia, Italy | 25k | Clay | (Russia) Irina Khromacheva | (Australia) Monique Adamczak (Japan) Yurika Sema | 4–6, 5–7 |
| Loss | 15–13 | Sep 2013 | Sofia Cup, Bulgaria | 25k | Clay | (Spain) Beatriz García Vidagany | (Bulgaria) Dia Evtimova (Bulgaria) Viktoriya Tomova | 4–6, 6–2, [6–10] |
| Loss | 15–14 | Sep 2013 | ITF Budapest, Hungary | 25k | Clay | (Ukraine) Veronika Kapshay | (Switzerland) Timea Bacsinszky (Switzerland) Xenia Knoll | 6–7^{(3)}, 2–6 |
| Win | 16–14 | Jan 2014 | ITF Port St. Lucie, United States | 25k | Clay | (Russia) Irina Khromacheva | (United States) Jan Abaza (United States) Louisa Chirico | 6–4, 6–4 |
| Win | 17–14 | Mar 2014 | ITF Dijon, France | 15k | Hard (i) | (Bulgaria) Isabella Shinikova | (Czech Republic) Martina Borecká (Netherlands) Michaëlla Krajicek | 6–3, 7–5 |
| Win | 18–14 | Jun 2014 | ITF Budapest, Hungary | 25k | Clay | (Russia) Irina Khromacheva | (Slovenia) Dalila Jakupović (Czech Republic) Kateřina Kramperová | 7–5, 6–4 |
| Loss | 18–15 | Sep 2014 | ITF Dobrich, Bulgaria | 25k | Clay | (Bulgaria) Isabella Shinikova | (Romania) Irina Bara (Romania) Andreea Mitu | 5–7, 6–7^{(5)} |
| Win | 19–15 | Oct 2014 | ITF Heraklion, Greece | 10k | Hard | (Bulgaria) Julia Stamatova | (Hungary) Anna Bondár (Hungary) Dalma Gálfi | 6–4, 6–4 |
| Loss | 19–16 | Nov 2014 | ITF Antalya, Turkey | 10k | Clay | (Bulgaria) Julia Stamatova | (Georgia (country)) Ekaterine Gorgodze (Georgia (country)) Sofia Kvatsabaia | 6–7^{(3)}, 6–7^{(7)} |
| Win | 20–16 | Apr 2015 | Chiasso Open, Switzerland | 25k | Clay | (Romania) Diana Buzean | (Italy) Giulia Gatto-Monticone (Italy) Alice Matteucci | 6–2, 7–5 |
| Loss | 20–17 | Jun 2015 | ITF Padua, Italy | 25k | Clay | (Argentina) Paula Ormaechea | (Argentina) María Irigoyen (Czech Republic) Barbora Krejčíková | 4–6, 2–6 |
| Loss | 20–18 | Sep 2015 | Open de Biarritz, France | 100k | Clay | (Liechtenstein) Stephanie Vogt | (Turkey) Başak Eraydın (Belarus) Lidziya Marozava | 4–6, 4–6 |
| Loss | 20–19 | Dec 2015 | ITF Cairo, Egypt | 25k | Clay | (Italy) Martina Caregaro | (Russia) Valentyna Ivakhnenko (Slovenia) Dalila Jakupović | w/o |
| Win | 21–19 | Feb 2016 | ITF Trnava, Slovakia | 10k | Hard (i) | (Slovakia) Chantal Škamlová | (Slovakia) Lenka Juríková (Czech Republic) Tereza Malíková | 6–3, 2–6, [10–7] |
| Loss | 21–20 | Mar 2016 | ITF Curitiba, Brazil | 25k | Clay | (Italy) Martina Caregaro | (Argentina) Catalina Pella (Chile) Daniela Seguel | 3–6, 6–7^{(5)} |
| Win | 22–20 | May 2016 | ITF Győr, Hungary | 25k | Clay | (Croatia) Ana Vrljić | (Hungary) Vanda Lukács (Slovakia) Chantal Škamlová | 6–4, 6–3 |
| Loss | 22–21 | Jun 2016 | ITF Rome, Italy | 25k | Clay | (Venezuela) Andrea Gámiz | (Italy) Claudia Giovine (Poland) Katarzyna Piter | 3–6, 6–3, [7–10] |
| Loss | 22–22 | Jun 2016 | ATV Roma, Italy | 50k | Clay | (Georgia (country)) Sofia Shapatava | (Turkey) İpek Soylu (China) Xu Shilin | 5–7, 1–6 |
| Loss | 22–23 | Aug 2016 | ITF Bükfürdő, Hungary | 25k | Clay | (Hungary) Dalma Gálfi | (Spain) Georgina García Pérez (Hungary) Fanny Stollár | 3–6, 6–7^{(4)} |
| Win | 23–23 | Aug 2017 | ITF Graz, Austria | 15k | Clay | (Hungary) Anna Bondár | (Slovakia) Jana Jablonovská (Slovakia) Natália Vajdová | 6–4, 6–3 |
| Loss | 23–24 | Sep 2017 | ITF Székesfehérvár, Hungary | 15k | Clay | (Hungary) Panna Udvardy | (Romania) Laura-Ioana Andrei (Romania) Elena Bogdan | 6–1, 2–6, [7–10] |
| Loss | 23–25 | Oct 2017 | ITF Antalya, Turkey | 15k | Clay | (Ukraine) Sofiya Kovalets | (Uzbekistan) Albina Khabibulina (Turkey) İpek Öz | 5–7, 6–1, [9–11] |
| Win | 24–25 | Oct 2017 | ITF Heraklion, Greece | 15k | Clay | (Hungary) Anna Bondár | (Belgium) Michaela Boëv (Russia) Anna Ukolova | 6–4, 6–2 |
| Win | 25–25 | Nov 2017 | ITF Heraklion, Greece | 15k | Clay | (Hungary) Anna Bondár | (Romania) Ioana Gaspar (Serbia) Bojana Marinković | 6–4, 2–6, [10–8] |
| Loss | 25–26 | Nov 2017 | ITF Antalya, Turkey | 15k | Clay | (Bulgaria) Dia Evtimova | (Ukraine) Maryna Chernyshova (Belarus) Sviatlana Pirazhenka | 4–6, 1–6 |
| Win | 26–26 | Mar 2018 | ITF Heraklion, Greece | 15k | Clay | (Hungary) Anna Bondár | (Finland) Emma Laine (United States) Sabrina Santamaria | 7–5, 6–2 |
| Win | 27–26 | Jun 2018 | Hódmezővásárhely Ladies Open, Hungary | 60k | Clay | (Argentina) Nadia Podoroska | (Montenegro) Danka Kovinić (Serbia) Nina Stojanović | 6–4, 6–4 |
| Loss | 27–27 | Aug 2018 | NEK Ladies Open, Hungary | 60k | Clay | (Hungary) Dalma Gálfi | (Norway) Ulrikke Eikeri (Bulgaria) Elitsa Kostova | 6–2, 4–6, [8–10] |
| Win | 28–27 | Oct 2018 | ITF Pula, Italy | 25k | Clay | (Romania) Cristina Dinu | (Italy) Giorgia Marchetti (Italy) Camilla Rosatello | 3–6, 6–1, [13–11] |
| Loss | 28–28 | Dec 2018 | Dubai Tennis Challenge, UAE | 100k | Hard | (Sweden) Cornelia Lister | (Russia) Alena Fomina (Russia) Valentina Ivakhnenko | 5–7, 2–6 |
| Loss | 28–29 | Mar 2019 | ITF Pula, Italy | W25 | Clay | (Romania) Cristina Dinu | (Russia) Alena Fomina (Russia) Valentina Ivakhnenko | 5–7, 6–3, [8–10] |
| Win | 29–29 | Jun 2019 | Grado Tennis Cup, Italy | W25 | Clay | (Kazakhstan) Anna Danilina | (Uzbekistan) Akgul Amanmuradova (Romania) Cristina Dinu | 6–2, 6–3 |
| Win | 30–29 | Jul 2019 | ITF Biella, Italy | W25 | Clay | (Romania) Elena Bogdan | (Japan) Chihiro Muramatsu (Japan) Yuki Naito | 6–1, 6–3 |
| Loss | 30–30 | Jul 2019 | ITF Baja, Hungary | W25 | Clay | (Belgium) Lara Salden | (Austria) Melanie Klaffner (Egypt) Mayar Sherif | 2–6, 6–4, [8–10] |
| Loss | 30–31 | Sep 2019 | ITF Sankt Pölten, Austria | W25 | Clay | (Hungary) Anna Bondár | (Romania) Irina Fetecău (Hungary) Panna Udvardy | 6–7^{(5)}, 6–0, [9–11] |
| Loss | 30–32 | Sep 2019 | ITF Kaposvár, Hungary | W25 | Clay | (Hungary) Anna Bondár | (Hungary) Dalma Gálfi (Hungary) Adrienn Nagy | 6–7^{(5)}, 6–2, [3–10] |
| Win | 31–32 | Mar 2020 | ITF Antalya, Turkey | W25 | Clay | (Egypt) Mayar Sherif | (Turkey) Melis Sezer (Turkey) İpek Öz | 6–7^{(8)}, 6–1, [10–3] |
| Loss | 31–33 | Feb 2021 | ITF Potchefstroom, South Africa | W25 | Hard | (Hungary) Anna Bondár | (Czech Republic) Miriam Kolodziejová (Czech Republic) Jesika Malečková | 2–6, 6–3, [5–10] |
| Win | 32–33 | Mar 2021 | ITF Manacor, Spain | W25 | Hard | (Belgium) Lara Salden | (Hungary) Anna Bondár (Slovakia) Tereza Mihalíková | 6–4, 7–5 |
| Win | 33–33 | Jun 2021 | ITF Otočec, Slovenia | W25 | Clay | (Norway) Ulrikke Eikeri | (Slovenia) Pia Lovrič (Burundi) Sada Nahimana | 5–7, 6–4, [10–5] |
| Win | 34–33 | Mar 2022 | ITF Anapoima, Colombia | W25 | Clay | (Switzerland) Ylena In-Albon | (Argentina) María Carlé (Brazil) Laura Pigossi | 1–6, 6–3, [10–7] |

== National representation ==
=== Fed Cup/Billie Jean King Cup ===
Jani made her debut for the Hungary Fed Cup team in 2010, while the team was competing in the Europe/Africa Zone Group I, when she was 18 years and 187 days old.

| Group membership World Group World Group Play-off World Group II World Group II Play-off Europe/Africa Group (23–17) | Matches by surface Hard (23–17) Clay (0–0) Grass (0–0) Carpet (0–0) | Matches by type Singles (11–10) Doubles (12–7) | Matches by setting Indoors (15–8) Outdoors (8–9) |

==== Singles: 21 (11–10) ====
| Edition | Stage | Date | Location | Against | Surface | Opponent | W/L | Score |
|---|---|---|---|---|---|---|---|---|
| 2010 | Z1 Pool C | Feb 2010 | Lisbon (POR) | Latvia | Hard (i) | Diāna Marcinkeviča | W | 2–6, 6–4, 7–5 |
| 2010 | Z1 Pool C | Feb 2010 | Lisbon (POR) | Denmark | Hard (i) | Karina Jacobsgaard | W | 6–0, 6–1 |
| 2010 | Z1 Pool C | Feb 2010 | Lisbon (POR) | Sweden | Hard (i) | Johanna Larsson | L | 4–6, 2–6 |
| 2010 | Z1 PO | Feb 2010 | Lisbon (POR) | Romania | Hard (i) | Simona Halep | L | 4–6, 2–6 |
| 2011 | Z1 Pool D | Feb 2011 | Eilat (ISR) | Romania | Hard | Monica Niculescu | L | 0–6, 2–6 |
| 2012 | Z1 Pool B | Feb 2012 | Eilat (ISR) | Greece | Hard | Maria Sakkari | W | 6–4, 7–5 |
| 2012 | Z1 Pool B | Feb 2012 | Eilat (ISR) | Sweden | Hard | Sofia Arvidsson | L | 4–6, 3–6 |
| 2012 | Z1 Pool B | Feb 2012 | Eilat (ISR) | Bosnia and Herzegovina | Hard | Anita Husarić | W | 3–6, 6–1, 6–2 |
| 2012 | Z1 PO | Feb 2012 | Eilat (ISR) | Romania | Hard | Simona Halep | L | 2–6, 3–6 |
| 2013 | Z1 PO | Feb 2013 | Eilat (ISR) | Netherlands | Hard | Bibiane Schoofs | W | 6–3, 2–6, 6–3 |
| 2014 | Z1 Pool B | Feb 2014 | Budapest (HUN) | Romania | Hard (i) | Sorana Cîrstea | L | 1–6, 0–6 |
| 2014 | Z1 Pool B | Feb 2014 | Budapest (HUN) | Latvia | Hard (i) | Jeļena Ostapenko | W | 6–0, 6–4 |
| 2014 | Z1 Pool B | Feb 2014 | Budapest (HUN) | (United Kingdom) Great Britain | Hard (i) | Heather Watson | L | 4–6, 1–6 |
| 2014 | Z1 PO | Feb 2014 | Budapest (HUN) | Israel | Hard (i) | Keren Shlomo | W | 6–4, 6–3 |
| 2015 | Z1 Pool A | Feb 2015 | Budapest (HUN) | Austria | Hard (i) | Barbara Haas | W | 7–5, 6–2 |
| 2015 | Z1 PO | Feb 2015 | Budapest (HUN) | Belgium | Hard (i) | Kirsten Flipkens | W | 2–6, 7–6^{(5)}, ret. |
| 2016 | Z1 Pool D | Feb 2016 | Eilat (ISR) | Bulgaria | Hard | Tsvetana Pironkova | L | 1–6, 1–6 |
| 2016 | Z1 Pool D | Feb 2016 | Eilat (ISR) | Latvia | Hard | Jeļena Ostapenko | L | 3–6, 2–6 |
| 2016 | Z1 RPO | Feb 2016 | Eilat (ISR) | South Africa | Hard | Chanel Simmonds | W | 6–0, 6–3 |
| 2018 | Pool C | Feb 2018 | Tallinn (EST) | Sweden | Hard (i) | Cornelia Lister | L | 2–6, 6–0, 6–7^{(6)} |
| 2019 | Z1 PO | Feb 2019 | Bath (GBR) | Croatia | Hard (i) | Jana Fett | W | 3–6, 5–2 ret. |

==== Doubles: 19 (12–7) ====
| Edition | Stage | Date | Location | Against | Surface | Partner | Opponents | W/L | Score |
|---|---|---|---|---|---|---|---|---|---|
| 2010 | Z1 Pool C | Feb 2010 | Lisbon (POR) | Latvia | Hard (i) | Anikó Kapros | Līga Dekmeijere; Anastasija Sevastova | W | 7–6^{(3)}, 6–1 |
| 2010 | Z1 Pool C | Feb 2010 | Lisbon (POR) | Denmark | Hard (i) | Zsófia Susányi | Malou Ejdesgaard; Karina Jacobsgaard | L | 6–3, 3–6, 1–6 |
| 2010 | Z1 Pool C | Feb 2010 | Lisbon (POR) | Sweden | Hard (i) | Zsófia Susányi | Ellen Allgurin; Anna Brazhnikova | L | 4–6, 2–6 |
| 2010 | Z1 PO | Feb 2010 | Lisbon (POR) | Romania | Hard (i) | Anikó Kapros | Irina-Camelia Begu; Alexandra Dulgheru | W | w/o |
| 2011 | Z1 Pool D | Feb 2011 | Eilat (ISR) | Latvia | Hard | Tímea Babos | Līga Dekmeijere; Irina Kuzmina | W | 6–4, 6–3 |
| 2011 | Z1 Pool D | Feb 2011 | Eilat (ISR) | Netherlands | Hard | Katalin Marosi | Kiki Bertens; Richèl Hogenkamp | L | 6–2, 2–6, 2–6 |
| 2012 | Z1 Pool B | Feb 2012 | Eilat (ISR) | Sweden | Hard | Tímea Babos | Sofia Arvidsson; Johanna Larsson | L | 6–7^{(9)}, 6–2, 4–6 |
| 2012 | Z1 Pool B | Feb 2012 | Eilat (ISR) | Bosnia and Herzegovina | Hard | Tímea Babos | Jelena Stanivuk; Jasmina Tinjić | W | 6–1, 6–4 |
| 2013 | Z1 Pool B | Feb 2013 | Eilat (ISR) | Portugal | Hard | Katalin Marosi | Margarida Moura; Joana Valle Costa | W | 6–4, 6–2 |
| 2013 | Z1 Pool B | Feb 2013 | Eilat (ISR) | (United Kingdom) Great Britain | Hard | Katalin Marosi | Johanna Konta; Laura Robson | W | 6–4, 2–6, 6–2 |
| 2014 | Z1 Pool B | Feb 2014 | Budapest (HUN) | Romania | Hard (i) | Tímea Babos | Irina-Camelia Begu; Monica Niculescu | L | 7–6^{(5)}, 2–6, 0–6 |
| 2014 | Z1 Pool B | Feb 2014 | Budapest (HUN) | Latvia | Hard (i) | Tímea Babos | Diāna Marcinkeviča; Jeļena Ostapenko | W | 7–5, 3–6, 6–1 |
| 2014 | Z1 Pool B | Feb 2014 | Budapest (HUN) | (United Kingdom) Great Britain | Hard (i) | Tímea Babos | Johanna Konta; Tara Moore | W | 5–7, 7–5, 6–3 |
| 2014 | Z1 PO | Feb 2014 | Budapest (HUN) | Israel | Hard (i) | Szabina Szlavikovics | Ofri Lankri; Keren Shlomo | W | 6–3, 6–4 |
| 2015 | Z1 Pool A | Feb 2015 | Budapest (HUN) | Serbia | Hard (i) | Tímea Babos | Ivana Jorović; Aleksandra Krunić | W | 4–6, 7–6^{(2)}, 6–2 |
| 2016 | Z1 Pool D | Feb 2016 | Eilat (ISR) | Belgium | Hard | Dalma Gálfi | Ysaline Bonaventure; An-Sophie Mestach | L | 6–3, 2–6, 2–6 |
| 2016 | Z1 Pool D | Feb 2016 | Eilat (ISR) | Latvia | Hard | Dalma Gálfi | Diāna Marcinkeviča; Jeļena Ostapenko | L | 6–7^{(2)}, 3–6 |
| 2018 | Z1 Pool C | Feb 2018 | Tallinn (EST) | Croatia | Hard (i) | Anna Bondár | Darija Jurak; Tena Lukas | W | 3–2 ret. |
| 2019 | Z1 Pool A | Feb 2019 | Bath (GBR) | Greece | Hard (i) | Dalma Gálfi | Despina Papamichail; Maria Sakkari | W | 6–3, 6–4 |
| 2019 | Z1 Pool A | Feb 2019 | Bath (GBR) | Slovenia | Hard (i) | Adrienn Nagy | Nina Potočnik; Nika Radišič | W | 7–6^{(3)}, 4–6, 6–2 |
