= Tina Obrez =

Slovenian tennis player

Tina Bohorič
- Country (sports): Slovenia
- Born: Tina Obrez; 21 April 1986 (age 39) Ljubljana, SR Slovenia, SFR Yugoslavia
- Prize money: $25,718

Singles
- Career record: 85–79
- Career titles: 2 ITF
- Highest ranking: No. 489 (27 February 2006)

Doubles
- Career record: 66–47
- Career titles: 6 ITF
- Highest ranking: No. 447 (15 May 2006)

Team competitions
- Fed Cup: 1–1

Tina Bohorič (née Obrez, born 21 April 1986) is a retired Slovenian tennis player.

Obrez was born in Ljubljana. She won two singles and six doubles titles on the ITF Circuit in her career. On 27 February 2006, she reached her best singles ranking of world No. 489. On 15 May 2006, she peaked at No. 447 in the doubles rankings. She played for the Slovenia Fed Cup team on two occasions.

Obrez made the third qualifying round at the 2008 Slovenia Open, losing to Maria Elena Camerin and narrowly missing out on a place in the main draw, but received a wildcard alongside Anja Prislan in the doubles draw.

== ITF Circuit finals ==
=== Singles (2–0) ===
Legend $25,000 tournaments $10,000 tournaments	Finals by surface Hard (0–0) Clay (2–0)

Outcome	No.	Date	Tournament	Surface	Opponent	Score
Winner	1.	3 October 2005	Herceg Novi, Serbia and Montenegro	Clay	(Serbia and Montenegro) Nataša Zorić	7–6^{(7–4)}, 2–6, 6–4
Winner	2.	17 October 2005	Dubrovnik, Croatia	Clay	(Croatia) Ani Mijačika	6–1, 7–5

=== Doubles (6–7) ===
Legend $25,000 tournaments $10,000 tournaments	Finals by surface Hard (0–0) Clay (6–7)

Outcome	No.	Date	Tournament	Surface	Partner	Opponents	Score
Runner-up	1.	2 May 2005	Dubrovnik, Croatia	Clay	(Slovenia) Meta Sevšek	(Ukraine) Natalia Bogdanova (Russia) Evgeniya Rodina	6–4, 4–6, 4–6
Runner-up	2.	27 June 2005	Padua, Italy	Clay	(Slovenia) Aleksandra Lukič	(Italy) Giulia Meruzzi (Italy) Nancy Rustignoli	7–5, 1–6, 2–6
Winner	1.	18 July 2005	Ancona, Italy	Clay	(Slovenia) Aleša Bagola	(Italy) Eleonora Iannozzi (Italy) Stella Menna	6–1, 6–0
Runner-up	3.	3 October 2005	Herceg Novi, Serbia and Montenegro	Clay	(Serbia and Montenegro) Miljana Adanko	(Serbia and Montenegro) Vanja Čorović (Serbia and Montenegro) Nataša Zorić	7–5, 4–6, 2–6
Winner	2.	17 October 2005	Dubrovnik, Croatia	Clay	(Serbia and Montenegro) Vanja Čorović	(Slovakia) Lenka Broošová (Slovakia) Lenka Wienerová	6–4, 6–2
Winner	3.	24 April 2006	Cavtat, Croatia	Clay	(Slovenia) Anja Prislan	(Australia) Christina Horiatopoulos (Belgium) Caroline Maes	w/o
Winner	4.	1 May 2006	Dubrovnik, Croatia	Clay	(Slovenia) Polona Reberšak	(Serbia and Montenegro) Karolina Jovanović (Romania) Antonia Xenia Tout	6–3, 6–4
Runner-up	4.	6 November 2006	Mallorca, Spain	Clay	(Slovenia) Anja Prislan	(Italy) Stefania Chieppa (Argentina) María Belén Corbalán	4–6, 7–6^{(3)}, 0–6
Runner-up	5.	14 April 2008	Bol, Croatia	Clay	(Slovenia) Anja Prislan	(United Kingdom) Naomi Broady (Switzerland) Amra Sadiković	4–6, 3–6
Runner-up	6.	6 April 2009	Šibenik, Croatia	Clay	(Slovenia) Mika Urbančič	(Serbia) Teodora Mirčić (Serbia) Nataša Zorić	0–6, 3–6
Winner	5.	29 June 2009	Prokuplje, Serbia	Clay	(Serbia) Karolina Jovanović	(Hungary) Aleksandra Filipovski (Hungary) Virág Németh	6–7^{(4)}, 6–1, [16–14]
Winner	6.	17 August 2009	Vinkovci, Croatia	Clay	(Serbia) Karolina Jovanović	(Romania) Raluca Elena Platon (Romania) Cristina Stancu	6–1, 6–2
Runner-up	7.	24 August 2009	Pörtschach, Austria	Clay	(Italy) Martina Caciotti	(Italy) Evelyn Mayr (Italy) Julia Mayr	2–6, 6–4, [6–10]
