= Samantha Schoeffel =

French tennis player

- Full name: Samantha Schoeffel-Hechinger
- Country (sports): France
- Residence: Obernai, France
- Born: 24 January 1981 (age 44) Cape Town, South Africa
- Prize money: $33,876

Singles
- Career record: 95–62
- Career titles: 5 ITF
- Highest ranking: No. 430 (18 May 2009)

Doubles
- Career record: 65–42
- Career titles: 10 ITF
- Highest ranking: No. 198 (12 July 1999)

Grand Slam doubles results
- French Open: 1R (1999)

Samantha Schoeffel-Hechinger (born 24 January 1981) is a former professional tennis player from France.

== Biography ==
Schoeffel, who is originally from Cape Town, South Africa began competing on the professional circuit in 1996.

As a doubles player, she broke into the world's top 200, with WTA Tour quarterfinal appearances at the 1999 Internationaux de Strasbourg and the 2000 Belgian Open. She featured in the women's doubles main draw at the 1999 French Open, as a wildcard pairing with Stéphanie Foretz.

In 2001, she left the tour to play collegiate tennis at Florida State University, later returning to the professional circuit in 2006 and going on to win five ITF Circuit singles titles. She reached her best singles ranking of 430 in the world in 2009.

== ITF finals ==
$25,000 tournaments
$10,000 tournaments

=== Singles (5–3) ===
Result	No.	Date	Tournament	Surface	Opponent	Score
Loss	1.	12 August 2007	ITF Rebecq, Belgium	Clay	(Germany) Julia Babilon	2–6, 0–6
Loss	2.	28 October 2007	ITF Dubrovnik, Croatia	Clay	(Serbia) Nataša Zorić	6–0, 6–7^{(5–7)}, 1–6
Win	1.	5 November 2007	ITF Le Havre, France	Clay (i)	(Netherlands) Romana Janshen	6–1, 6–2
Loss	3.	22 September 2008	ITF Clermont-Ferrand, France	Hard (i)	(Russia) Ksenia Lykina	4–6, 4–6
Win	2.	6 October 2008	ITF Barcelona, Spain	Clay	(Georgia (country)) Ekaterine Gorgodze	6–2, 6–1
Win	3.	18 October 2008	ITF Dubrovnik, Croatia	Clay	(Italy) Paola Cigui	6–1, 6–3
Win	4.	9 November 2008	ITF Le Havre, France	Clay (i)	(France) Shérazad Reix	7–6^{(7–4)}, 7–6^{(8–6)}
Win	5.	5 April 2009	ITF Antalya, Turkey	Hard	(Germany) Julia Babilon	6–7^{(8–10)}, 0–1 ret.

=== Doubles (10–5) ===
Result	No.	Date	Tournament	Surface	Partner	Opponents	Score
Loss	1.	15 March 1998	ITF Biel, Switzerland	Hard (i)	(Switzerland) Laura Bao	(Germany) Kirstin Freye (United States) Jean Okada	0–6, 7–6, 1–6
Loss	2.	3 August 1998	ITF Périgueux, France	Clay	(France) Stephanie Testard	(Spain) Paula García (Republic of Ireland) Kelly Liggan	6–3, 3–6, 6–7^{(3–7)}
Win	1.	22 November 1998	ITF Deauville, France	Carpet (i)	(France) Emmanuelle Curutchet	(Bulgaria) Lubomira Bacheva (Uzbekistan) Iroda Tulyaganova	6–1, 2–6, 7–6
Win	2.	9 May 1999	ITF Seoul, South Korea	Clay	(Uzbekistan) Iroda Tulyaganova	(South Korea) Choi Young-ja (South Korea) Kim Eun-sook	6–3, 4–6, 6–4
Win	3.	24 April 2000	ITF Talence, France	Hard	(France) Séverine Beltrame	(France) Aurore Desert (France) Magalie Lamarre	6–2, 6–2
Win	4.	12 August 2007	ITF Rebecq, Belgium	Clay	(France) Émilie Bacquet	(Netherlands) Claire Lablans (Netherlands) Marcella Koek	7–6^{(8–6)}, 6–7^{(3–7)}, 6–4
Win	5.	19 August 2007	ITF Koksijde, Belgium	Clay	(France) Émilie Bacquet	(Poland) Sylwia Zagórska (Poland) Olga Brózda	6–1, 6–1
Win	6.	24 August 2007	ITF Westende, Belgium	Hard	(France) Claire de Gubernatis	(Belgium) Leslie Butkiewicz (United Kingdom) Katharina Brown	4–6, 6–2, 6–2
Win	7.	16 September 2007	ITF Casale Monferrato, Italy	Clay	(France) Émilie Bacquet	(Italy) Stefania Chieppa (Italy) Giulia Gatto-Monticone	6–2, 6–2
Loss	3.	21 October 2007	ITF Dubrovnik, Croatia	Clay	(France) Émilie Bacquet	(Serbia) Nataša Zorić (Serbia) Miljana Adanko	3–6, 3–6
Win	8.	11 November 2007	ITF Le Havre, France	Clay (i)	(France) Elodie Caillat	(Russia) Anna Savitskaya (Netherlands) Bibiane Schoofs	6–2, 2–6, [10–6]
Win	9.	17 August 2008	ITF Versmold, Germany	Clay	(Netherlands) Bibiane Schoofs	(Germany) Nicola Geuer (Germany) Laura Haberkorn	4–6, 7–6^{(7–5)}, [10–5]
Loss	4.	28 September 2008	ITF Clermont-Ferrand, France	Hard (i)	(Netherlands) Bibiane Schoofs	(Russia) Ksenia Lykina (Italy) Vivienne Vierin	3–6, 2–6
Loss	5.	12 October 2008	ITF Barcelona, Spain	Clay	(Netherlands) Bibiane Schoofs	(United States) Kristi Miller (Spain) Lucía Sainz	7–6^{(7–5)}, 6–7^{(6–8)}, [7–10]
Win	10.	8 November 2008	ITF Le Havre, France	Clay (i)	(Netherlands) Bibiane Schoofs	(Croatia) Ana Bezjak (Serbia) Neda Kozić	6–3, 6–1
