= Ani Mijačika =

Croatian tennis player

- Country (sports): Croatia
- Born: 15 June 1987 (age 38) Tučepi, SR Croatia, SFR Yugoslavia
- Retired: 2014, active again 2016–18
- Plays: Right (two-handed backhand)
- Prize money: $90,964

Singles
- Career record: 203–114
- Career titles: 10 ITF
- Highest ranking: No. 193 (17 October 2011)

Grand Slam singles results
- US Open: Q1 (2010, 2011)

Doubles
- Career record: 82–56
- Career titles: 10 ITF
- Highest ranking: No. 222 (19 September 2011)

Team competitions
- Fed Cup: 4–5

Ani Mijačika (Croatian pronunciation: [mijǎtʃika]; born 15 June 1987) is a Croatian former tennis player. On 17 October 2011, she reached her highest WTA singles ranking of 193 whilst her best doubles ranking was 222 in September 2011.

Mijačika retired from professional tour in September 2014, but she has resurfaced in low level ITF events as of April 2016, and has played matches until September 2018.

== ITF Circuit finals ==
Legend
$50,000 tournaments
$25,000 tournaments
$15,000 tournaments
$10,000 tournaments

=== Singles: 17 (10 titles, 7 runner-ups) ===
Result	No.	Date	Tournament	Surface	Opponent	Score
Loss	1.	23 October 2005	ITF Dubrovnik, Croatia	Clay	(Slovenia) Tina Obrež	1–6, 5–7
Win	2.	30 October 2005	ITF Dubrovnik	Clay	(Serbia) Andrea Popović	6–4, 7–5
Win	3.	9 April 2006	ITF Makarska, Croatia	Clay	(Sweden) Kristina Andlovic	6–4, 7–6
Loss	4.	14 May 2006	ITF Mostar, Bosnia and Herzegovina	Clay	(Serbia) Ana Jovanović	2–6, 4–6
Win	5.	21 May 2006	ITF Zadar, Croatia	Clay	(Slovenia) Tadeja Majerič	6–1, 7–5
Loss	6.	2 August 2009	ITF Palić, Serbia	Clay	(Hungary) Aleksandra Filipovski	3–6, 5–7
Win	7.	9 August 2009	ITF Arad, Romania	Clay	(Romania) Diana Enache	6–1, 6–2
Win	8.	23 August 2009	ITF Vinkovci, Croatia	Clay	(Croatia) Maria Abramović	6–2, 6–3
Loss	9.	8 November 2009	ITF Rock Hill, United States	Hard	(Australia) Sacha Jones	0–6, 4–6
Win	10.	12 September 2010	ITF Sarajevo, Bosnia and Herzegovina	Clay	(Bulgaria) Viktoriya Tomova	6–1, 6–2
Win	11.	27 February 2011	ITF Portimão, Portugal	Hard	(Germany) Justine Ozga	6–4, 6–4
Loss	12.	3 April 2011	ITF Wenshan, China	Hard (i)	(France) Iryna Brémond	5–7, 6–3, 5–7
Win	13.	20 June 2011	ITF Lenzerheide, Switzerland	Clay	(Switzerland) Amra Sadiković	6–3, 3–6, 6–3
Win	14.	4 September 2011	ITF Sarajevo	Clay	(Argentina) Florencia Molinero	6–1, 3–6, 6–4
Win	15.	1 May 2016	ITF Tučepi, Croatia	Clay	(Croatia) Tereza Mrdeža	6–3, 1–6, 6–3
Loss	16.	23 October 2016	ITF Bol, Croatia	Clay	(Czech Republic) Gabriela Pantůčková	3–6, 2–6
Loss	17.	19 March 2017	ITF Hammamet, Tunisia	Clay	(Slovenia) Nina Potočnik	0–6, 0–6

=== Doubles: 17 (10 titles, 7 runner-ups) ===
Result	No.	Date	Tournament	Surface	Partner	Opponents	Score
Win	1.	2 October 2005	Royal Cup, Montenegro	Clay	(Bosnia and Herzegovina) Dijana Stojić	(Serbia) Neda Kozić (Serbia) Vesna Manasieva	1–6, 6–3, 6–3
Win	2.	30 October 2005	ITF Dubrovnik, Croatia	Clay	(Croatia) Josipa Bek	(Slovenia) Polona Reberšak (Slovenia) Patricia Vollmeier	7–6, 7–6
Win	3.	21 January 2006	ITF Oberhaching, Germany	Carpet (i)	(Croatia) Josipa Bek	(Austria) Eva-Maria Hoch (Germany) Martina Pavelec	2–6, 6–1, 6–4
Loss	4.	23 April 2006	ITF Bol, Croatia	Clay	(Croatia) Josipa Bek	(Australia) Christina Horiatopoulos (Germany) Sarah Raab	7–5, 6–7, 5–7
Win	5.	13 May 2006	ITF Mostar, Bosnia and Herzegovina	Clay	(Croatia) Jelena Stanivuk	(Serbia) Karolina Jovanović (Slovenia) Polona Reberšak	6–7, 7–6, 6–4
Win	6.	20 May 2006	ITF Zadar, Croatia	Clay	(Croatia) Josipa Bek	(Slovenia) Polona Reberšak (Croatia) Jelena Stanivuk	6–4, 2–6, 6–1
Win	7.	31 July 2009	ITF Palić, Serbia	Clay	(Hungary) Dunja Antunović	(Poland) Katarzyna Kawa (Slovakia) Simonka Parajová	6–4, 6–0
Win	8.	4 September 2009	ITF Maribor, Slovenia	Clay	(Croatia) Ana Vrljić	(Croatia) Maria Abramović (Slovakia) Katarína Kachlíková	6–2, 6–3
Loss	9.	10 September 2010	ITF Sarajevo, Bosnia and Herzegovina	Clay	(Croatia) Matea Čutura	(Russia) Yana Buchina (Russia) Polina Rodionova	6–7, 6–2, [5–10]
Loss	10.	17 September 2010	ITF Zagreb, Croatia	Clay	(Croatia) Ana Vrljić	(Argentina) Mailen Auroux (Serbia) Nataša Zorić	5–7, 7–5, [12–14]
Win	11.	26 February 2011	ITF Portimão, Portugal	Hard	(Switzerland) Amra Sadiković	(Russia) Ksenia Gospodinova (Germany) Dejana Raickovic	6–1, 7–6
Win	12.	18 March 2011	ITF Sanya, China	Hard	(France) Iryna Brémond	(Japan) Rika Fujiwara (Chinese Taipei) Hsu Wen-hsin	3–6, 7–5, [12–10]
Loss	13.	14 May 2011	ITF Zagreb, Croatia	Clay	(Croatia) Ana Vrljić	(Bulgaria) Elitsa Kostova (Poland) Barbara Sobaszkiewicz	6–1, 3–6, [10–12]
Loss	14.	30 May 2011	ITF Maribor, Slovenia	Clay	(Croatia) Ana Vrljić	(Colombia) Karen Castiblanco (Venezuela) Adriana Pérez	3–6, 6–7
Loss	15.	6 June 2011	ITF Campobasso, Italy	Clay	(France) Irena Pavlovic	(Argentina) Mailen Auroux (Argentina) María Irigoyen	2–6, 6–3, [11–13]
Win	16.	20 June 2011	ITF Lenzerheide, Switzerland	Clay	(Switzerland) Amra Sadiković	(Austria) Nikola Hofmanova (Slovakia) Romana Tabak	4–6, 6–2, [10–4]
Loss	17.	23 October 2016	ITF Bol, Croatia	Clay	(Croatia) Mariana Dražić	(Croatia) Lea Bošković (Slovenia) Kaja Juvan	6–4, 5–7, [4–10]

== Fed Cup participation ==
=== Singles ===
Edition	Stage	Date	Location	Against	Surface	Opponent	W/L	Score
2011 Fed Cup; Europe/Africa Zone Group I	R/R	3 February 2011	Eilat, Israel	Belarus	Hard	(Belarus) Olga Govortsova	L	2–6, 2–6
2011 Fed Cup; Europe/Africa Zone Group I	R/R	4 February 2011	Eilat, Israel	Austria	Hard	(Austria) Patricia Mayr-Achleitner	W	4–6, 7–6^{(7–2)}, 7–5
2012 Fed Cup; Europe/Africa Zone Group I	R/R	1 February 2012	Eilat, Israel	Romania	Hard	(Romania) Simona Halep	L	2–6, 2–6
2012 Fed Cup; Europe/Africa Zone Group I	R/R	3 February 2012	Eilat, Israel	Luxembourg	Hard	(Luxembourg) Claudine Schaul	W	6–1, 2–6, 6–4
