= 2011 Fed Cup Europe/Africa Zone Group I – play-offs =

The play-offs of the 2011 Fed Cup Europe/Africa Zone Group I were the final stages of the Group I Zonal Competition involving teams from Europe and Africa. Using the positions determined in their pools, the fifteen teams faced off to determine their placing in the 2011 Fed Cup Europe/Africa Zone Group I. The top two teams advanced to World Group II play-offs, and the bottom two teams were relegated down to the Europe/Africa Zone Group II.

Placing	Pool A	Pool B	Pool C	Pool D
1	Switzerland	Poland	Belarus	Netherlands
2	Great Britain	Israel	Croatia	Romania
3		Luxembourg	Austria	Hungary
4	Denmark	Bulgaria	Greece	Latvia

== Promotion play-offs ==
The first placed teams of each pool were drawn in head-to-head rounds. The winner of each round advanced to the World Group II play-offs, where they'd get a chance to advanced to World Group II.

=== Belarus vs. Poland ===
Belarus
2
Municipal Tennis Club, Eilat, Israel
February 5, 2011
Hard (outdoors)

Poland
0

			1	2	3
1	(Belarus) (Poland)	Olga Govortsova; Magda Linette	7^{7} 6^{2}	7^{7} 6^{0}
2	(Belarus) (Poland)	Victoria Azarenka; Agnieszka Radwańska	7; 5	7; 5
3	(Belarus) (Poland)	Victoria Azarenka / Olga Govortsova; Klaudia Jans / Alicja Rosolska				not played

=== Netherlands vs. Switzerland ===
Netherlands
1
Municipal Tennis Club, Eilat, Israel
February 5, 2011
Hard (outdoors)

Switzerland
2

			1	2	3
1	(Netherlands) (Switzerland)	Michaëlla Krajicek; Timea Bacsinszky	4; 6	7; 5	5; 7
2	(Netherlands) (Switzerland)	Arantxa Rus; Patty Schnyder	6; 4	6; 1
3	(Netherlands) (Switzerland)	Michaëlla Krajicek / Arantxa Rus; Timea Bacsinszky / Patty Schnyder	5; 7	2; 6

== 5th to 8th play-offs ==
The second placed teams of each pool were drawn in head-to-head rounds to find the equal fifth and seventh placed teams.

=== Croatia vs. Great Britain ===
Croatia
0
Municipal Tennis Club, Eilat, Israel
February 5, 2011
Hard (outdoors)

Great Britain
2

			1	2	3
1	(Croatia) (United Kingdom)	Silvia Njirić; Heather Watson	2; 6	5; 7
2	(Croatia) (United Kingdom)	Ajla Tomljanović; Elena Baltacha	2; 6	3; 6
3	(Croatia) (United Kingdom)	Silvia Njirić / Ajla Tomljanović; Jocelyn Rae / Heather Watson				not played

=== Israel vs. Romania ===
Israel
2
Municipal Tennis Club, Eilat, Israel
February 5, 2011
Hard (outdoors)

Romania
1

			1	2	3
1	(Israel) (Romania)	Julia Glushko; Monica Niculescu	4; 6	1; 6
2	(Israel) (Romania)	Shahar Pe'er; Alexandra Dulgheru	6; 0	7; 5
3	(Israel) (Romania)	Julia Glushko / Shahar Pe'er; Cristina Dinu / Alexandra Dulgheru	6; 4	6; 3

== 9th to 12th play-offs ==
The third placed teams of each pool except Pool A were drawn in head-to-head rounds to find the equal ninth and the eleventh placed teams.

=== Austria vs. Luxembourg ===
Austria
2
Municipal Tennis Club, Eilat, Israel
February 5, 2011
Hard (outdoors)

Luxembourg
1

			1	2	3
1	(Austria) (Luxembourg)	Melanie Klaffner; Anne Kremer	0; 6	4; 6
2	(Austria) (Luxembourg)	Sybille Bammer; Mandy Minella	6; 4	6; 2
3	(Austria) (Luxembourg)	Melanie Klaffner / Sandra Klemenschits; Anne Kremer / Mandy Minella	0; 6	6; 0	7; 5

- Hungary was not drawn against anyone due to the odd number of teams in Pool A. As such, Hungary was automatically named an equal 9th team along with Austria.

== Relegation play-offs ==
The last placed teams of each pool were drawn in head-to-head rounds. The loser of each round was relegated down to Europe/Africa Zone Group II in 2012.

=== Denmark vs. Greece ===
Denmark
1
Municipal Tennis Club, Eilat, Israel
February 5, 2011
Hard (outdoors)

Greece
2

			1	2	3
1	(Denmark) (Greece)	Karen Barbat; Eirini Georgatou	1; 6	6^{2} 7^{7}
2	(Denmark) (Greece)	Caroline Wozniacki; Eleni Daniilidou	6; 0	6; 3
3	(Denmark) (Greece)	Mai Grage / Caroline Wozniacki; Eleni Daniilidou / Eirini Georgatou	2; 6	5; 7

=== Bulgaria vs. Latvia ===
Bulgaria
2
Municipal Tennis Club, Eilat, Israel
February 5, 2011
Hard (outdoors)

Latvia
0

			1	2	3
1	(Bulgaria) (Latvia)	Dia Evtimova; Irina Kuzmina	5; 7	6; 3	6; 3
2	(Bulgaria) (Latvia)	Elitsa Kostova; Līga Dekmeijere	6; 3	6; 3
3	(Bulgaria) (Latvia)	Elitsa Kostova / Magdalena Maleeva; Līga Dekmeijere / Irina Kuzmina				not played

== Final Placements ==
Placing	Teams	
Promoted	Belarus	Switzerland
Third	Poland	Netherlands
Fifth	Great Britain	Israel
Seventh	Croatia	Romania
Ninth	Austria	Hungary
Eleventh	Luxembourg	
Twelfth	Greece	Bulgaria
Relegated	Denmark	Latvia

- Belarus advanced to the World Group II play-offs, where they were drawn against Estonia. They won 5–0, and as such progressed through to World Group II for 2012. Their win against Estonia was the most decisive in Fed Cup history, with Estonia winning only thirteen games.
- Switzerland advanced to the World Group II play-offs, where they were drawn against Sweden. They won 4–1, and as such progressed through to World Group II for 2012.
- Denmark and Latvia were relegated down to the 2012 Fed Cup Europe/Africa Zone Group II. Both teams were positioned in the relegation play-offs, where they were drawn against each other. The Latvians won, meaning they remained in Group II for 2013, while the Danes lost and were relegated down to Group III.

== See also ==
- Fed Cup structure
