= 2011 Fed Cup Europe/Africa Zone Group I – Pool D =

Group D of the 2011 Fed Cup Europe/Africa Zone Group I was one of four pools in the Europe/Africa zone of the 2011 Fed Cup. Three teams competed in a round robin competition, with the top team and the bottom team proceeding to their respective sections of the play-offs: the top team played for advancement to the World Group II Play-offs, while the bottom team faced potential relegation to Group II.

		(Netherlands) NED	(Hungary) HUN	(Romania) ROU	(Latvia) LAT	RR; W–L	Set; W–L	Game; W–L	Standings
27	Netherlands		3–0	3–0	3–0	3–0	18–2	115–60	1
28	Hungary	0–3		1–2	3–0	1–2	9–10	74–84	3
32	Romania	0–3	2–1		2–1	2–1	10–10	96–80	2
46	Latvia	0–3	0–3	1–2		0–3	2–17	50–111	4

== Netherlands vs. Romania ==
Netherlands
3
Municipal Tennis Club, Eilat, Israel
February 2, 2011
hard (outdoors)

Romania
0

			1	2	3
1	(Netherlands) (Romania)	Michaëlla Krajicek; Monica Niculescu	6; 3	6; 1
2	(Netherlands) (Romania)	Arantxa Rus; Alexandra Dulgheru	6; 4	6; 3
3	(Netherlands) (Romania)	Kiki Bertens / Richèl Hogenkamp; Alexandra Dulgheru / Monica Niculescu	7^{8} 6^{6}	3; 6	7; 5

== Hungary vs. Latvia ==
Hungary
3
Municipal Tennis Club, Eilat, Israel
February 2, 2011
Hard (outdoors)

Latvia
0

			1	2	3
1	(Hungary) (Latvia)	Tímea Babos; Irina Kuzmina	6; 3	6; 4
2	(Hungary) (Latvia)	Gréta Arn; Līga Dekmeijere	6; 3	6; 0
3	(Hungary) (Latvia)	Tímea Babos / Réka-Luca Jani; Līga Dekmeijere / Irina Kuzmina	6; 4	6; 3

== Netherlands vs. Hungary ==
Netherlands
3
Municipal Tennis Club, Eilat, Israel
February 3, 2011
Hard (outdoors)

Hungary
0

			1	2	3
1	(Netherlands) (Hungary)	Michaëlla Krajicek; Tímea Babos	6; 2	6; 3
2	(Netherlands) (Hungary)	Arantxa Rus; Gréta Arn	6; 2	6; 4
3	(Netherlands) (Hungary)	Kiki Bertens / Richèl Hogenkamp; Réka-Luca Jani / Katalin Marosi	2; 6	6; 2	6; 2

== Romania vs. Latvia ==
Romania
2
Municipal Tennis Club, Eilat, Israel
February 3, 2011
Hard (outdoors)

Latvia
1

			1	2	3
1	(Romania) (Latvia)	Monica Niculescu; Irina Kuzmina	6; 4	6; 2
2	(Romania) (Latvia)	Alexandra Dulgheru; Līga Dekmeijere	6; 2	6; 1
3	(Romania) (Latvia)	Cristina Dinu / Alexandra Dulgheru; Līga Dekmeijere / Irina Kuzmina	4; 6	6; 0	5; 7

== Netherlands vs. Latvia ==
Netherlands
3
Municipal Tennis Club, Eilat, Israel
February 4, 2011
Hard (outdoors)

Latvia
0

			1	2	3
1	(Netherlands) (Latvia)	Kiki Bertens; Lina Lileikite	6; 2	6; 1
2	(Netherlands) (Latvia)	Michaëlla Krajicek; Līga Dekmeijere	6; 2	6; 2
3	(Netherlands) (Latvia)	Kiki Bertens / Richèl Hogenkamp; Līga Dekmeijere / Irina Kuzmina	6; 1	6; 3

== Hungary vs. Romania ==
Hungary
1
Municipal Tennis Club, Eilat, Israel
February 4, 2011
Hard (outdoors)

Romania
2

			1	2	3
1	(Hungary) (Romania)	Réka-Luca Jani; Monica Niculescu	0; 6	2; 6
2	(Hungary) (Romania)	Tímea Babos; Alexandra Dulgheru	1; 6	1; 6
3	(Hungary) (Romania)	Gréta Arn / Tímea Babos; Cristina Dinu / Alexandra Dulgheru	7; 5	6; 0

== See also ==
- Fed Cup structure
