= Karolina Jovanović =

Serbian tennis player

Karolina Jovanović Каролина Јовановић
- Country (sports): Serbia and Montenegro (2003–2006); Serbia (2006–2010)
- Residence: Niš, Serbia
- Born: 13 February 1988 (age 37); Niš, SR Serbia, SFR Yugoslavia
- Height: 1.83 m (6 ft 0 in)
- Turned pro: 2003
- Retired: 2010
- Plays: Right (two-handed backhand)
- Prize money: $33,614

Singles
- Career record: 95–74
- Career titles: 2 ITF
- Highest ranking: No. 404 (30 July 2007)

Doubles
- Career record: 104–42
- Career titles: 13 ITF
- Highest ranking: No. 201 (20 August 2007)

Karolina Jovanović (Serbian Cyrillic: Каролина Јовановић; born 13 February 1988) is a Serbian former tennis player.

Jovanović won two singles and 13 doubles titles on the ITF Circuit in her career. On 30 July 2007, she reached her best singles ranking of world No. 404. On 20 August 2007, she peaked at No. 201 in the doubles rankings.

== ITF Circuit finals ==
Legend
$75,000 tournaments
$50,000 tournaments
$25,000 tournaments
$10,000 tournaments

=== Singles: 6 (2–4) ===
Result	No.	Date	Tournament	Surface	Opponent	Score
Loss	1.	7 May 2006	ITF Dubrovnik, Croatia	Clay	(Belgium) Caroline Maes	1–6, 1–6
Loss	2.	30 July 2006	ITF Arad, Romania	Clay	(Romania) Ágnes Szatmári	1–6, 3–6
Win	1.	22 October 2006	ITF Dubrovnik, Croatia	Clay	(Croatia) Ivana Gelo	2–6, 6–3, 6–1
Win	2.	20 April 2007	ITF Hvar, Croatia	Clay	(Slovakia) Kristína Kučová	6–1, 6–4
Loss	3.	1 July 2007	ITF Sarajevo, Bosnia Herzegovina	Clay	(Serbia) Teodora Mirčić	3–6, 3–6
Loss	4.	5 July 2009	ITF Prokuplje, Serbia	Clay	(Hungary) Virág Németh	4–6, 6–2, 5–7

=== Doubles: 25 (13–12) ===
Outcome	No.	Date	Tournament	Surface	Partner	Opponents	Score
Runner-up	1.	6 June 2004	Palić Open, Serbia and Montenegro	Clay	(Serbia and Montenegro) Nataša Zorić	(Serbia and Montenegro) Ana Četnik (Serbia and Montenegro) Ljiljana Nanušević	w/o
Runner-up	2.	30 August 2004	ITF Kranjska Gora, Slovenia	Clay	(Czech Republic) Janette Bejlková	(Slovenia) Polona Reberšak (Slovenia) Maša Zec Peškirič	7–6^{(4)}, 6–1
Winner	1.	24 July 2005	Palić Open, Serbia and Montenegro	Clay	(Serbia and Montenegro) Nataša Zorić	(Serbia and Montenegro) Tatjana Ječmenica (France) Ana-Maria Zubori]	6–1, 6–4
Winner	2.	16 April 2006	ITF Hvar, Croatia	Clay	(Romania) Antonia Xenia Tout	(Serbia and Montenegro) Neda Kozić (Serbia and Montenegro) Andrea Popović	6–1, 2–6, 6–0
Runner-up	3.	7 May 2006	ITF Dubrovnik, Croatia	Clay	(Romania) Antonia Xenia Tout	(Slovenia) Tina Obrež (Slovenia) Polona Reberšak	6–3, 6–4
Runner-up	4.	13 May 2006	ITF Mostar, Bosnia Herzegovina	Clay	(Slovenia) Polona Reberšak	(Croatia) Ani Mijačika (Bosnia and Herzegovina) Jelena Stanivuk	6–7^{(0)}, 7–6^{(4)}, 6–4
Runner-up	5.	7 July 2006	ITF Prokuplje, Serbia	Clay	(Serbia) Neda Kozić	(Slovenia) Aleksandra Lukič (Slovenia) Patricia Vollmeier	6–4, 6–4
Runner-up	6.	28 July 2006	ITF Arad, Romania	Clay	(Serbia) Neda Kozić	(Romania) Laura Ioana Andrei (Romania) Gabriela Niculescu	6–2, 6–3
Winner	3.	1 October 2006	Royal Cup, Montenegro	Clay	(Croatia) Josipa Bek	(Ukraine) Lyudmyla Kichenok (Ukraine) Nadiia Kichenok	6–4, 5–7, 6–2
Runner-up	7.	22 October 2006	ITF Dubrovnik, Croatia	Clay	(Slovenia) Polona Reberšak	(Serbia) Teodora Mirčić (Serbia) Ana Veselinović	6–1, 6–1
Winner	4.	9 June 2007	ITF Dubrovnik, Croatia	Clay	(Serbia) Nataša Zorić	(Croatia) Mirna Marinović (Bosnia and Herzegovina) Jelena Stanivuk	5–1 ret.
Runner-up	8.	20 April 2007	ITF Cavtat, Croatia	Clay	(Serbia) Nataša Zorić	(Russia) Anastasia Poltoratskaya (Croatia) Ana Savić	6–1, 6–1
Runner-up	9.	20 April 2007	ITF Hvar, Croatia	Clay	(France) Émilie Bacquet	(Romania) Mihaela Buzărnescu (Poland) Magdalena Kiszczyńska	6–4, 6–2
Winner	5.	9 June 2007	Zagreb Ladies Open, Croatia	Clay	(Russia) Anastasia Poltoratskaya	(Montenegro) Danica Krstajić (Serbia) Teodora Mirčić	0–6, 6–4, 6–1
Winner	6.	24 June 2007	ITF Sarajevo, Bosnia Herzegovina	Clay	(Russia) Vasilisa Davydova	(Russia) Vitalia Diatchenko (Croatia) Tamara Stojković	1–6, 6–0, 6–0
Winner	7.	29 June 2007	ITF Sarajevo, Bosnia Herzegovina	Clay	(Serbia) Teodora Mirčić	(Slovakia) Katarína Poljaková (Slovakia) Zuzana Zlochová	6–1, 6–0
Runner-up	10.	4 August 2007	ITF Rimini, Italy	Clay	(Bosnia and Herzegovina) Mervana Jugić-Salkić	(Estonia) Maret Ani (Slovenia) Andreja Klepač	6–0, 6–4
Runner-up	11.	29 June 2008	ITF Sarajevo, Bosnia Herzegovina	Clay	(Bosnia and Herzegovina) Ema Burgić	(Italy) Martina Caciotti (Slovenia) Mika Urbančič	6–4, 6–3
Winner	8.	5 July 2008	ITF Prokuplje, Serbia	Clay	(Serbia) Ljubica Avramović	(Hungary) Aleksandra Filipovski (Hungary) Virág Németh	7–6^{(4)}, 6–4
Winner	9.	4 July 2009	ITF Prokuplje, Serbia	Clay	(Slovenia) Tina Obrež	(Hungary) Aleksandra Filipovski (Hungary) Virág Németh	6–7^{(4)}, 6–1, [16–14]
Winner	10.	22 August 2009	ITF Vinkovci, Croatia	Clay	(Slovenia) Tina Obrež	(Romania) Raluca Elena Platon (Romania) Cristina Stancu	6–1, 6–2
Winner	11.	5 September 2009	ITF Brčko, Bosnia Herzegovina	Clay	(Serbia) Teodora Mirčić	(Romania) Patricia Chirea (Slovenia) Petra Pajalič	6–4, 6–1
Winner	12.	12 September 2009	ITF Sarajevo, Bosnia Herzegovina	Clay	(Romania) Cristina Stancu	(Italy) Martina Caciotti (Slovakia) Zuzana Zlochová	6–4, 0–6, [11–9]
Runner-up	12.	10 October 2009	Royal Cup Montenegro	Clay	(Serbia) Teodora Mirčić	(Italy) Nicole Clerico (Poland) Karolina Kosińska	7–6^{(4)}, 4–6, [4–10]
Winner	13.	10 July 2010	ITF Prokuplje, Serbia	Clay	(Slovenia) Polona Reberšak	(Slovakia) Vivien Juhászová (Czech Republic) Tereza Malíková	3–6, 6–2, [10–2]
