= Polona Reberšak =

Slovenian tennis player

- Country (sports): Slovenia
- Born: 9 February 1987 (age 38); Celje, SFR Yugoslavia
- Prize money: $35,468

Singles
- Career record: 147–117
- Career titles: 1 ITF
- Highest ranking: No. 499 (10 July 2006)

Grand Slam singles results
- French Open Junior: 1R (2005)
- Wimbledon Junior: 1R (2005)

Doubles
- Career record: 100–61
- Career titles: 12 ITF
- Highest ranking: No. 506 (30 October 2006)

Grand Slam doubles results
- Wimbledon Junior: 1R (2005)

Team competitions
- Fed Cup: 2–1

Polona Reberšak (born 9 February 1987) is a Slovenian former professional tennis player. Today she is a stringer to professional tennis player Naomi Osaka.

In her career, Reberšak won one singles title and 12 doubles titles on the ITF Women's Circuit. On 10 July 2006, she reached her best singles ranking of world No. 499. On 30 October 2006, she peaked at No. 506 in the doubles rankings.

Reberšak made three appearances for the Slovenia Fed Cup team in April 2006.

== ITF Circuit finals ==
=== Singles: 3 (1 title, 2 runner-ups) ===
Legend $25,000 tournaments $10,000 tournaments	Finals by surface Hard (1–0) Clay (0–2)

Result	No.	Date	Tournament	Surface	Opponent	Score
Win	1	Feb 2006	ITF Portimão, Portugal	Hard	(Portugal) Magali de Lattre	7–5, 6–4
Loss	1	Oct 2006	ITF Dubrovnik, Croatia	Clay	(Croatia) Ana Savić	6–1, 3–6, 4–6
Loss	2	Oct 2013	ITF Dubrovnik, Croatia	Clay	(Czech Republic) Barbora Krejčíková	1–6, 6–3, 0–6

=== Doubles: 22 (12 titles, 10 runner-ups) ===
Legend $25,000 tournaments $10,000 tournaments	Finals by surface Hard (0–1) Clay (12–9)

Result	No.	Date	Tournament	Surface	Partner	Opponents	Score
Win	1	4 September 2004	ITF Kranjska Gora, Slovenia	Clay	(Slovenia) Maša Zec Peškirič	(Czech Republic) Janette Bejlková (Serbia and Montenegro) Karolina Jovanović	7–6^{(4)}, 6–1
Loss	1	29 October 2005	ITF Dubrovnik, Croatia	Clay	(Slovenia) Patricia Vollmeier	(Croatia) Josipa Bek (Croatia) Ani Mijačika	6–7^{(3)}, 6–7^{(2)}
Loss	2	18 February 2006	ITF Albufeira, Portugal	Hard	(Romania) Sorana Cîrstea	(France) Émilie Bacquet (Netherlands) Chayenne Ewijk	4–6, 4–6
Win	2	6 May 2006	ITF Dubrovnik, Croatia	Clay	(Slovenia) Tina Obrez	(Serbia and Montenegro) Karolina Jovanović (Romania) Antonia Xenia Tout	6–3, 6–4
Loss	3	12 May 2006	ITF Mostar, Bosnia and Herzegovina	Clay	(Serbia and Montenegro) Karolina Jovanović	(Croatia) Ani Mijačika (Bosnia and Herzegovina) Jelena Stanivuk	7–6^{(0)}, 6–7^{(4)}, 6–4
Loss	4	20 May 2006	ITF Zadar, Croatia	Clay	(Bosnia and Herzegovina) Jelena Stanivuk	(Croatia) Josipa Bek (Croatia) Ani Mijačika	4–6, 6–2, 1–6
Loss	5	21 October 2006	ITF Dubrovnik, Croatia	Clay	(Serbia) Karolina Jovanović	(Serbia) Teodora Mirčić (Serbia) Ana Veselinović	4–6, 5–7
Win	3	28 August 2009	ITF Velenje, Slovenia	Clay	(Slovenia) Nastja Kolar	(Romania) Camelia Hristea (Romania) Diana Marcu	6–3, 6–2
Win	4	10 July 2010	ITF Prokuplje, Serbia	Clay	(Serbia) Karolina Jovanović	(Slovakia) Vivien Juhászová (Czech Republic) Tereza Malíková	3–6, 6–2, [10–2]
Win	5	20 August 2010	ITF Čakovec, Croatia	Clay	(Slovenia) Nastja Kolar	(Slovakia) Katarína Baranová (Slovakia) Simonka Parajová	6–0, 6–1
Win	6	2 July 2011	ITF Prokuplje, Serbia	Clay	(Hungary) Zsófia Susányi	(Bulgaria) Isabella Shinikova (Bulgaria) Julia Stamatova	6–4, 7–6^{(2)}
Win	7	9 July 2011	ITF Prokuplje, Serbia	Clay	(Hungary) Zsófia Susányi	(Romania) Claudia Enache (Austria) Katharina Negrin	6–2, 4–6, 6–4
Win	8	17 August 2012	ITF Innsbruck, Austria	Clay	(Bosnia and Herzegovina) Jasmina Kajtazovič	(Czech Republic) Klára Dohnalová (Czech Republic) Lenka Kunčíková	7–5, 2–6, [20–18]
Loss	6	16 August 2013	ITF Innsbruck, Austria	Clay	(Slovenia) Nastja Kolar	(United Kingdom) Lucy Brown (Sweden) Hilda Melander	6–3, 3–6, [7–10]
Win	9	24 August 2013	ITF Pörtschach, Austria	Clay	(Slovenia) Nastja Kolar	(Italy) Gioia Barbieri (Italy) Giulia Sussarello	6–0, 2–6, [10–4]
Loss	7	19 October 2013	ITF Dubrovnik, Croatia	Clay	(Czech Republic) Gabriela Pantůčková	(Slovakia) Lenka Juríková (Czech Republic) Barbora Krejčíková	5–7, 6–3, [4–10]
Win	10	25 July 2014	ITF Bad Waltersdorf, Austria	Clay	(Austria) Pia König	(Czech Republic) Kristýna Hrabalová (Czech Republic) Tereza Janatová	6–7^{(4)}, 7–5, [14–12]
Win	11	21 August 2015	ITF Graz, Austria	Clay	(Austria) Lisa Hofbauer	(Slovenia) Pia Brglez (Austria) Katharina Knöbl	7–5, 6–0
Loss	8	12 June 2016	ITF Velenje, Slovenia	Clay	(Slovenia) Manca Pislak	(Czech Republic) Gabriela Pantůčková (Czech Republic) Magdaléna Pantůčková	6–4, 6–7^{(0)}, [11–13]
Loss	9	17 June 2016	ITF Maribor, Slovenia	Clay	(Romania) Gabriela Talabă	(Slovenia) Nastja Kolar (United Kingdom) Francesca Stephenson	7–5, 0–6, [3–10]
Loss	10	24 June 2016	ITF Maribor, Slovenia	Clay	(Slovenia) Manca Pislak	(Slovenia) Sara Palčič (Slovenia) Nina Potočnik	3–6, 2–6
Win	12	22 July 2016	ITF Bad Waltersdorf, Austria	Clay	(Slovenia) Nina Potočnik	(Slovenia) Nastja Kolar (United Kingdom) Francesca Stephenson	6–3, 6–4

== Fed Cup participation ==
=== Singles ===
Edition	Stage	Date	Location	Against	Surface	Opponent	W/L	Score
2006 Fed Cup; Europe/Africa Zone Group I	R/R	18 April 2006	Plovdiv, Bulgaria	Serbia and Montenegro	Clay	(Serbia and Montenegro) Ana Timotić	W	6–3, 6–2
2006 Fed Cup; Europe/Africa Zone Group I	R/R	19 April 2006	Plovdiv, Bulgaria	Denmark	Clay	(Denmark) Karina Jacobsgaard	L	3–6, 6–1, 1–6
2006 Fed Cup; Europe/Africa Zone Group I	R/R	20 April 2006	Plovdiv, Bulgaria	South Africa	Clay	(South Africa) Elze Potgieter	W	6–2, 6–3
