= Hilda Melander =

Swedish tennis player

- Country (sports): Sweden
- Born: 1 December 1991 (age 33); Stockholm, Sweden
- Plays: Right-handed (two-handed backhand)
- Prize money: $45,892

Singles
- Career record: 129–101
- Career titles: 3 ITF
- Highest ranking: No. 311 (8 September 2014)

Doubles
- Career record: 92–68
- Career titles: 9 ITF
- Highest ranking: No. 224 (10 November 2014)

Hilda Melander (born 1 December 1991) is a Swedish former tennis player.

In her career, she won three singles titles and nine doubles titles on the ITF Women's Circuit. On 8 September 2014, she reached her best singles ranking of world No. 311. On 10 November 2014, she peaked at No. 224 in the WTA doubles rankings.

Melander made her debut for Sweden Fed Cup team in February 2012. In Fed Cup competitions, she has a win–loss record of 2–2.

== ITF finals ==
=== Singles (3–4) ===
Legend $15,000 tournaments $10,000 tournaments	Finals by surface Hard (0–0) Clay (3–4)

Result	No.	Date	Tournament	Surface	Opponent	Score
Loss	1.	21 May 2011	Båstad, Sweden	Clay	(Colombia) Yuliana Lizarazo	2–6, 6–3, 2–6
Loss	2.	12 June 2011	Almere, Netherlands	Clay	(Poland) Anna Korzeniak	2–6, 5–7
Win	1.	21 August 2011	Piešťany, Slovakia	Clay	(Czech Republic) Denisa Allertová	6–3, 6–3
Loss	3.	2 October 2011	Antalya, Turkey	Clay	(Czech Republic) Zuzana Zálabská	1–6, 6–7^{(6–8)}
Loss	4.	25 January 2013	Lima, Peru	Clay	(Brazil) Maria Fernanda Alves	2–6, 2–6
Win	2.	17 August 2013	Innsbruck, Austria	Clay	(Croatia) Tena Lukas	6–2, 6–3
Win	3.	24 August 2014	Wanfercée-Baulet, Belgium	Clay	(Belgium) Sofie Oyen	3–6, 6–3, 6–2

=== Doubles (9–8) ===
Legend $25,000 tournaments $15,000 tournaments $10,000 tournaments	Finals by surface Hard (5–2) Clay (4–6)

Result	No.	Date	Tournament	Surface	Partner	Opponents	Score
Loss	1.	20 May 2011	Båstad, Sweden	Clay	(Sweden) Paulina Milosavljevic	(Poland) Olga Brózda (Poland) Natalia Kołat	3–6, 1–6
Loss	2.	6 August 2011	Savitaipale, Finland	Clay	(Sweden) Paulina Milosavljevic	(Russia) Ksenia Kirillova (Russia) Anastasia Vovk	4–6, 6–7^{(6–8)}
Win	1.	7 April 2012	Šibenik, Croatia	Clay	(Ukraine) Sofiya Kovalets	(Hungary) Vaszilisza Bulgakova (Germany) Anne Schäfer	2–1 ret.
Loss	3.	11 May 2012	Båstad, Sweden	Clay	(Sweden) Paulina Milosavljevic	(Sweden) Sandra Roma (Sweden) Eveliina Virtanen	2–6, 6–3, [7–10]
Win	2.	3 November 2012	Stockholm, Sweden	Hard (i)	(Sweden) Paulina Milosavljevic	(Germany) Carolin Daniels (Germany) Laura Schaeder	6–2, 6–1
Win	3.	23 March 2013	Sunderland, England	Hard (i)	(Sweden) Sandra Roma	(Republic of Ireland) Amy Bowtell (United Kingdom) Lucy Brown	6–0, 6–3
Win	4.	28 July 2013	Horb, Germany	Clay	(Russia) Tatiana Kotelnikova	(Germany) Carolin Daniels (Germany) Laura Schaeder	6–3, 6–3
Win	5.	16 August 2013	Innsbruck, Austria	Clay	(United Kingdom) Lucy Brown	(Slovenia) Nastja Kolar (Slovenia) Polona Reberšak	3–6, 6–3, [10–7]
Loss	4.	6 December 2013	Mérida, Mexico	Hard	(Sweden) Rebecca Peterson	(United States) Hsu Chieh-yu (Argentina) María Irigoyen	4–6, 7–5, [6–10]
Win	6.	20 December 2013	Mérida, Mexico	Hard	(Serbia) Barbara Bonić	(Bulgaria) Dia Evtimova (United States) Hsu Chieh-yu	6–3, 7–5
Win	7.	11 April 2014	Gloucester, England	Hard (i)	(United Kingdom) Lucy Brown	(United Kingdom) Sarah Beth Askew (United Kingdom) Katy Dunne	7–5, 6–3
Loss	5.	4 July 2014	Toruń, Poland	Clay	(Slovakia) Chantal Škamlová	(Czech Republic) Martina Borecká (Czech Republic) Martina Kubičíková	6–7^{(4–7)}, 2–6
Win	8.	27 July 2014	Horb, Germany	Clay	(Czech Republic) Barbora Štefková	(Germany) Carolin Daniels (Germany) Laura Schaeder	6–4, 6–1
Loss	6.	3 August 2014	Bad Saulgau, Germany	Clay	(Sweden) Rebecca Peterson	(Romania) Diana Buzean (Spain) Arabela Fernández Rabener	5–7, 3–6
Loss	7.	30 August 2014	Fleurus, Belgium	Clay	(Russia) Marina Melnikova	(Netherlands) Arantxa Rus (Netherlands) Demi Schuurs	4–6, 1–6
Win	9.	31 October 2015	Stockholm, Sweden	Hard (i)	(Sweden) Cornelia Lister	(Russia) Ksenia Gaydarzhi (Sweden) Anette Munozova	6–4, 6–3
Loss	8.	5 November 2016	Stockholm, Sweden	Hard (i)	(Sweden) Paulina Milosavljevic	(Sweden) Cornelia Lister (Ukraine) Anastasiya Shoshyna	6–7^{(3–7)}, 2–6
