= Nataša Zorić =

Serbian tennis player

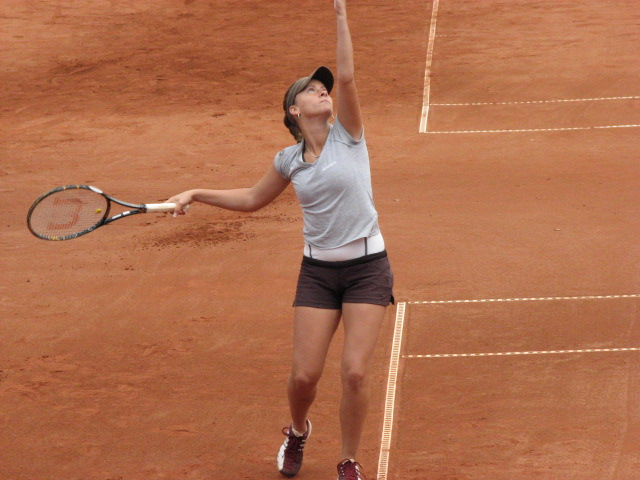
- Zorić at the Allianz Cup, 2008
- Country (sports): Serbia and Montenegro; Serbia
- Residence: Palić, Serbia
- Born: 27 November 1989 (age 35); Osijek, SR Croatia, SFR Yugoslavia
- Turned pro: 2004
- Plays: Right-handed (two-handed backhand)
- Prize money: $45,707

Singles
- Career record: 152–85
- Career titles: 4 ITF
- Highest ranking: No. 388 (6 October 2008)

Doubles
- Career record: 88–49
- Career titles: 12 ITF
- Highest ranking: No. 218 (6 October 2008)

Nataša Zorić (Serbian Cyrillic: Наташа Зорић, pronounced [nâtaʃa zǒːritɕ]; born 27 November 1989) is a Serbian former tennis player. Zorić has reached one WTA Tour final in doubles, at the 2008 Gastein Ladies with Sesil Karatantcheva, where they lost to Andrea Hlaváčková and Lucie Hradecká in straight sets. Her career-high rankings are 388 in singles and No. 218 in doubles, both set on 6 October 2008. Zorić won four ITF singles titles, and 12 ITF doubles titles in her career.

After solving injury problems, Zorić won the singles title at the ITF Budapest on 14 June 2009.

== WTA Tour finals ==
=== Doubles: 1 (runner-up) ===
Legend
Tier III (0–1)

Result	Date	Tournament	Tier	Surface	Partner	Opponents	Score
Loss	Jul 2008	Gastein Ladies, Austria	Tier III	Clay	(Kazakhstan) Sesil Karatantcheva	(Czech Republic) Andrea Hlaváčková (Czech Republic) Lucie Hradecká	3–6, 3–6

== ITF Circuit finals ==
Legend
$10,000 tournaments

=== Singles: 8 (4–4) ===
Result	W–L	Date	Tournament	Tier	Surface	Opponent	Score
Loss	1.	9 October 2005	ITF Herceg Novi, Serbia and Montenegro	10,000	Clay	(Slovenia) Tina Obrež	6–7^{(4)}, 6–2, 4–6
Win	2.	16 April 2006	ITF Hvar, Croatia	10,000	Clay	(Bosnia and Herzegovina) Dijana Stojić	6–2, 6–1
Loss	3.	28 May 2006	ITF Budapest, Hungary	10,000	Clay	(Hungary) Katalin Marosi	4–6, 5–7
Win	4.	1 April 2007	ITF Dubrovnik, Croatia	10,000	Clay	(Spain) Berta Morata Flaquer	6–1, 3–6, 6–1
Win	5.	28 October 2007	ITF Dubrovnik, Croatia	10,000	Clay	(France) Samantha Schoeffel	0–6, 7–6^{(5)}, 6–1
Win	6.	14 June 2009	ITF Budapest, Hungary	10,000	Clay	(Hungary) Virág Németh	4–6, 7–6^{(3)}, 6–4
Loss	7.	9 August 2009	ITF Vienna, Austria	10,000	Clay	(Czech Republic) Lucie Kriegsmannová	4–6, 7–6^{(7)}, 5–7
Loss	8.	31 October 2010	ITF Dubrovnik, Croatia	10,000	Clay	(Slovakia) Klaudia Boczová	3–6, 2–6

=== Doubles: 19 (12–7) ===
Legend
$25,000 tournaments
$10,000 tournaments

Result	W–L	Date	Tournament	Tier	Surface	Partner	Opponents	Score
Loss	1.	6 June 2004	Palić, Serbia and Montenegro	10,000	Clay	(Serbia and Montenegro) Karolina Jovanović	(Serbia and Montenegro) Ana Četnik (Serbia and Montenegro) Ljiljana Nanušević	w/o
Winner	2.	24 July 2005	Palić, Serbia and Montenegro	10,000	Clay	(Serbia and Montenegro) Karolina Jovanović	(Serbia and Montenegro) Tatjana Ječmenica (Serbia and Montenegro) Ana-Maria Zubori	6–1, 6–4
Winner	3.	3 October 2005	Herceg Novi, Serbia and Montenegro	10,000	Clay	(Serbia and Montenegro) Vanja Ćorović	(Slovenia) Tina Obrež (Serbia and Montenegro) Miljana Adanko	5–7, 6–4, 6–2
Winner	4.	23 May 2006	Budapest, Hungary	10,000	Clay	(Romania) Antonia Xenia Tout	(United Kingdom) Naomi Cavaday (United Kingdom) Georgie Gent	6–1, 6–2
Winner	5.	25 September 2006	Szeged, Hungary	10,000	Clay	(Romania) Antonia Xenia Tout	(Netherlands) Talitha De Groot (Czech Republic) Lucie Makrlikova	6–3, 6–3
Winner	6.	9 June 2007	Dubrovnik, Croatia	10,000	Clay	(Serbia) Karolina Jovanović	(Croatia) Mirna Marinović (Croatia) Jelena Stanivuk	5–1 ret.
Loss	7.	20 April 2007	Cavtat, Croatia	10,000	Clay	(Serbia) Karolina Jovanović	(Russia) Anastasia Poltoratskaya (Croatia) Ana Savić	1–6, 1–6
Winner	8.	9 July 2007	Prokuplje, Serbia	10,000	Clay	(Serbia) Neda Kozić	(Slovakia) Klaudia Boczová (Finland) Katarina Tuohimaa	6–4, 7–5
Loss	9.	28 August 2007	Pörtschach, Austria	10,000	Clay	(Slovenia) Taja Mohorčič	(Austria) Stefanie Haidner (Austria) Eva Hoch	2–6, 2–6
Winner	10.	4 September 2007	Brčko, Bosnia and Herzegovina	10,000	Clay	(Serbia) Neda Kozić	(Slovakia) Katarina Poljaková (Croatia) Petra Sunic	6–3, 6–2
Winner	11.	15 October 2007	Dubrovnik, Croatia	10,000	Clay	(Serbia) Miljana Adanko	(France) Émilie Bacquet (France) Samantha Schoeffel	6–3, 6–3
Winner	12.	22 October 2007	Dubrovnik, Croatia	10,000	Clay	(Serbia) Miljana Adanko	(Bulgaria) Biljana Pawlowa-Dimitrova (Belgium) Soetkin Van Deun	w/o
Winner	13.	12 April 2009	Šibenik, Croatia	10,000	Clay	(Serbia) Teodora Mirčić	(Slovenia) Tina Obrež (Slovenia) Mika Urbančič	6–0, 6–3
Loss	14.	22 May 2009	Craiova, Romania	10,000	Clay	(Romania) Simona Matei	(Bulgaria) Tanya Germanlieva (Bulgaria) Dessislava Mladenova	6–4, 1–6, [7–10]
Loss	15.	12 October 2009	Dubrovnik, Croatia	10,000	Clay	(France) Émilie Bacquet	(Slovakia) Michaela Honcová (Slovakia) Karin Morgosová	4–6, 6–3, [6–10]
Winner	16.	3 May 2010	Wiesbaden, Germany	10,000	Clay	(Serbia) Barbara Bonić	(Netherlands) Quirine Lemoine (Netherlands) Marlot Meddens	6–2, 6–2
Loss	17.	30 August 2010	Osijek, Croatia	10,000	Clay	(Croatia) Petra Sunic	(Hungary) Réka Luca Jani (Czech Republic) Martina Kubiciková	1–6, 1–6
Winner	18.	18 September 2010	Zagreb, Croatia	25,000	Clay	(Argentina) Mailen Auroux	(Croatia) Ani Mijačika (Croatia) Ana Vrljić	7–5, 5–7, [14–12]
Loss	19.	24 October 2010	ITF Dubrovnik, Croatia	10,000	Clay	(Romania) Elora Dabija	(Romania) Raluca Elena Platon (Romania) Ingrid Radu	6–1, 1–6, [6–10]
