= Josipa Bek =

Croatian tennis player (born 1988)

- Country (sports): Croatia
- Residence: Osijek, Croatia
- Born: 27 January 1988 (age 37); Osijek, SR Croatia, SFR Yugoslavia
- Turned pro: 2003
- Retired: 2007
- Plays: Right-handed
- College: Clemson Tigers
- Prize money: $16,055

Singles
- Career record: 67–43
- Career titles: 1 ITF
- Highest ranking: No. 549 (17 July 2006)

Grand Slam singles results
- Australian Open Junior: 1R (2005)

Doubles
- Career record: 52–24
- Career titles: 8 ITF
- Highest ranking: No. 277 (9 July 2007)

Grand Slam doubles results
- Australian Open Junior: 1R (2005)

Josipa Bek (born 27 January 1988) is a Croatian former tennis player and tennis coach who specialises in doubles. She won one singles title and eight doubles titles on the ITF Circuit.

== College ==
Bek played on the Clemson University with their tennis team between 2008 and 2011. She reached a career-high ranking of No. 8 in singles and No. 1 in doubles, partnering Keri Wong. Bek won her 100th career match against Florida State University, and her 106th doubles match in 2012, setting a new school record. Has 29 three-set match wins, which is the most three-set wins in school history. Three-times All-American champion in singles and three times All-American in doubles. Runner-up of the NCAA Doubles Championship in 2011 NCAA Division I Tennis Championships.

== Career ==
In July 2005, she won her first professional singles title at the $10k event in Garching beating compatriot Korina Perkovic in the final.

In September 2006, partnering Serbian Karolina Jovanović, she won the $25k Royal Cup in Podgorica, Montenegro. In the final, they defeated Ukrainian twin sisters Lyudmyla and Nadiia Kichenok.

In May 2007, at a $25k tournament in Warsaw, Poland, she and Bosnian Sandra Martinović beat Polish Karolina Kosińska and Russian Arina Rodionova in the final.

At the end of 2007, Bek ended her career having won over $16,000 prizemoney.
