= 2012 Telavi Open =

- Date: 24–30 September
- Edition: 5th
- Location: Telavi, Georgia

Champions

Singles
- (Ukraine) Elina Svitolina

Doubles
- (Hungary) Réka-Luca Jani / (Germany) Christina Shakovets
← 2011 ·	Telavi Open	· 2013 →

The 2012 Telavi Open will be a professional tennis tournament played on clay courts. It is the fifth edition of the tournament which is part of the 2012 ITF Women's Circuit. It takes place in Telavi, Georgia on 24–30 September 2012.

== WTA entrants ==
=== Seeds ===
Country	Player	Rank^{1}	Seed
UKR	Lesia Tsurenko	105	1
UKR	Elina Svitolina	155	2
RUS	Irina Khromacheva	176	3
SRB	Aleksandra Krunić	186	4
CRO	Tereza Mrdeža	190	5
NED	Richèl Hogenkamp	195	6
ITA	Anna Floris	200	7
GER	Anna-Lena Friedsam	201	8

- ^{1} Rankings are as of 17 September 2012.

=== Other entrants ===
The following players received wildcards into the singles main draw:

- (Georgia (country)) Natia Gegia
- (Georgia (country)) Ekaterine Gorgodze
- (Georgia (country)) Oksana Kalashnikova
- (Georgia (country)) Sofia Kvatsabaia

The following players received entry from the qualifying draw:

- (Russia) Victoria Kan
- (Russia) Margarita Lazareva
- (Ukraine) Anna Shkudun
- (Ukraine) Ganna Poznikhirenko

The following player received entry by a Special Exempt:

- (Czech Republic) Renata Voráčová

The following player received entry by a Special Ranking:

- (Belarus) Ekaterina Dzehalevich

== Champions ==
=== Singles ===
- (Ukraine) Elina Svitolina def. (Ukraine) Lesia Tsurenko, 6–1, 6–2

=== Doubles ===
- (Hungary) Réka-Luca Jani / (Germany) Christina Shakovets def. (Belarus) Ekaterina Dzehalevich / (Georgia (country)) Oksana Kalashnikova, 3–6, 6–4, [10–6]
