= 2013 Telavi Open – Singles =

Singles
- 2013 Telavi Open

Final
- Champion: (Russia) Alexandra Panova
- Runner-up: (Russia) Victoria Kan
- Score: 7–5, 6–1

Events
Singles	Doubles
← 2012 ·	Telavi Open	· 2014 →

Elina Svitolina was the defending champion, having won the event in 2012, but she decided to participate at the 2013 Toray Pan Pacific Open instead.

Alexandra Panova won the title, defeating Victoria Kan in the final, 7–5, 6–1.

== Seeds ==
1. (Romania) Andreea Mitu (semifinals)
2. (Russia) Alexandra Panova (champion)
3. (Poland) Paula Kania (first round)
4. (United States) Julia Cohen (first round)
5. (Italy) Maria Elena Camerin (second round)
6. (Russia) Irina Khromacheva (quarterfinals)
7. (Ukraine) Valentyna Ivakhnenko (first round)
8. (Georgia (country)) Sofia Shapatava (second round)

== Main draw ==
=== Key ===
- Q = Qualifier
- WC = Wild card
- LL = Lucky loser
- Alt = Alternate
- SE = Special exempt
- PR = Protected ranking
- ITF = ITF entry
- JE = Junior exempt
- w/o = Walkover
- r = Retired
- d = Defaulted
- SR = Special ranking

=== Finals ===
Semifinals
1	(Romania) Andreea Mitu	6	2	1
(Russia) Victoria Kan	4	6	6
Q	(Ukraine) Ganna Poznikhirenko	1	7	4
2	(Russia) Alexandra Panova	6	5	6

Final
(Russia) Victoria Kan	5	1
2	(Russia) Alexandra Panova	7	6

=== Top half ===
First round
1	(Romania) A Mitu	6	6
(Armenia) A Amiraghyan	1	2
WC	(Georgia (country)) M Bolkvadze	5	1
(Slovenia) M Zec Peškirič	7	6
(Ukraine) T Arefyeva	5	2
Q	(Slovenia) N Kolar	7	6
Q	(Russia) E Yashina	6	1	2
5	(Italy) ME Camerin	1	6	6
3	(Poland) P Kania	6	6^{2}	4
(Russia) V Kan	3	7^{7}	6
(Ukraine) A Shkudun	5	3
(Slovenia) D Jakupović	7	6
(Ukraine) O Ianchuk	4	7	6
WC	(Georgia (country)) S Kvatsabaia	6	5	1
(Belarus) I Kremen	7^{7}	7
7	(Ukraine) V Ivakhnenko	6^{3}	5

Second round
1	(Romania) A Mitu	6	4	6
(Slovenia) M Zec Peškirič	2	6	4
Q	(Slovenia) N Kolar	6	6
5	(Italy) ME Camerin	1	2
(Russia) V Kan	6	6
(Slovenia) D Jakupović	2	2
(Ukraine) O Ianchuk	2	3
(Belarus) I Kremen	6	6

Quarterfinals
1	(Romania) A Mitu	6	6
Q	(Slovenia) N Kolar	3	3
(Russia) V Kan	6	6
(Belarus) I Kremen	2	1

Semifinals
1	(Romania) A Mitu	6	2	1
(Russia) V Kan	4	6	6

=== Bottom half ===
First round
8	(Georgia (country)) S Shapatava	6	6
(Poland) K Kawa	3	2
(Japan) M Eguchi	1	6	6
WC	(Georgia (country)) E Gorgodze	6	4	3
(Japan) A Omae	6^{2}	2
Q	(Ukraine) G Poznikhirenko	7^{7}	6
(Russia) M Shamayko	6	5	6
4	(United States) J Cohen	4	7	1
6	(Russia) I Khromacheva	6	6
WC	(Georgia (country)) T Chalaganidze	1	1
(Germany) A Zaja	6	7
(Russia) M Lazareva	3	5
Q	(Brazil) L Pigossi	3	1
(Croatia) A Savić	6	6
(Georgia (country)) M Chakhnashvili	5	4
2	(Russia) A Panova	7	6

Second round
8	(Georgia (country)) S Shapatava	3	1
(Japan) M Eguchi	6	6
Q	(Ukraine) G Poznikhirenko	6	6
(Russia) M Shamayko	3	4
6	(Russia) I Khromacheva	6	6
(Germany) A Zaja	2	4
(Croatia) A Savić	6	4	4
2	(Russia) A Panova	3	6	6

Quarterfinals
(Japan) M Eguchi	3	5
Q	(Ukraine) G Poznikhirenko	6	7
6	(Russia) I Khromacheva	6	4	4
2	(Russia) A Panova	3	6	6

Semifinals
Q	(Ukraine) G Poznikhirenko	1	7	4
2	(Russia) A Panova	6	5	6
