= 2013 Telavi Open =

- Date: 23–29 September
- Edition: 6th
- Prize money: $50,000
- Surface: Clay
- Location: Telavi, Georgia

Champions

Singles
- (Russia) Alexandra Panova

Doubles
- (Italy) Maria Elena Camerin / (Slovenia) Anja Prislan
- Telavi Open

The 2013 Telavi Open was a professional tennis tournament played on outdoor clay courts. It was the sixth edition of the tournament which was part of the 2013 ITF Women's Circuit, offering a total of $50,000 in prize money. It took place in Telavi, Georgia, on 23–29 September 2013.

== Singles entrants ==
=== Seeds ===
Country	Player	Rank^{1}	Seed
ROU	Andreea Mitu	170	1
RUS	Alexandra Panova	177	2
POL	Paula Kania	195	3
USA	Julia Cohen	198	4
ITA	Maria Elena Camerin	201	5
RUS	Irina Khromacheva	222	6
UKR	Valentyna Ivakhnenko	226	7
GEO	Sofia Shapatava	233	8

- ^{1} Rankings as of 16 September 2013

=== Other entrants ===
The following players received wildcards into the singles main draw:

- (Georgia (country)) Mariam Bolkvadze
- (Georgia (country)) Tamari Chalaganidze
- (Georgia (country)) Ekaterine Gorgodze
- (Georgia (country)) Sofia Kvatsabaia

The following players received entry from the qualifying draw:

- (Slovenia) Nastja Kolar
- (Brazil) Laura Pigossi
- (Ukraine) Ganna Poznikhirenko
- (Russia) Ekaterina Yashina

== Champions ==
=== Singles ===
- (Russia) Alexandra Panova def. (Russia) Victoria Kan 7–5, 6–1

=== Doubles ===
- (Italy) Maria Elena Camerin / (Slovenia) Anja Prislan def. (Germany) Anna Zaja / (Slovenia) Maša Zec Peškirič 7–5, 6–2
