= 2013 Telavi Open – Doubles =

Doubles
- 2013 Telavi Open

Final
- Champions: (Italy) Maria Elena Camerin (Slovenia) Anja Prislan
- Runners-up: (Germany) Anna Zaja (Slovenia) Maša Zec Peškirič
- Score: 7–5, 6–2

Events
| Singles | Doubles |
- Telavi Open

Réka-Luca Jani and Christina Shakovets were the defending champions, having won the event in 2012, but Jani decided not to participate. Shakovets partnered up with Alona Fomina as the fourth seeds, but they lost in the first round.

Maria Elena Camerin and Anja Prislan won the title, defeating Anna Zaja and Maša Zec Peškirič in the final, 7–5, 6–2.

== Seeds ==
1. (Poland) Paula Kania / (Russia) Irina Khromacheva (semifinals)
2. (Belarus) Ilona Kremen / (Japan) Akiko Omae (quarterfinals)
3. (United States) Julia Cohen / (Russia) Ekaterina Yashina (first round)
4. (Ukraine) Alona Fomina / (Germany) Christina Shakovets (first round)

== Draw ==
Key

- Q = Qualifier
- WC = Wild card
- LL = Lucky loser
- Alt = Alternate
- ITF = ITF entry
- PR = Protected ranking
- SR = Special ranking
- SE = Special exempt
- JE = Junior exempt
- JR = Junior Accelerator Programme entrant
- CO = College Accelerator Programme entrant
- NG = Next Gen Accelerator Program entrant
- w/o = Walkover
- r = Retired
- d = Defaulted

First round
1 | (Poland) P Kania (Russia) I Khromacheva | 6 | 6
(Romania) A Mitu (Germany) J Steinherr | 3 | 1
WC | (Georgia (country)) B Machaidze (Georgia (country)) M Tchichashvili | 0 | 0
(Russia) O Doroshina (Brazil) L Pigossi | 6 | 6
3 | (United States) J Cohen (Russia) E Yashina | 6^{1} | 3
(Belarus) S Pirazhenka (Ukraine) A Shkudun | 7^{7} | 6
WC | (Georgia (country)) M Bolkvadze (Georgia (country)) T Chalaganidze | 0 | 4
(Germany) A Zaja (Slovenia) M Zec Peškirič | 6 | 6
(Poland) K Kawa (Russia) M Lazareva | 6^{5} | 6^{7}
WC | (Georgia (country)) M Chakhnashvili (Georgia (country)) S Kvatsabaia | 7^{7} | 7^{9}
(Georgia (country)) E Gorgodze (Georgia (country)) S Shaptava | 4 | 6 | [10]
4 | (Ukraine) A Fomina (Germany) C Shakovets | 6 | 3 | [8]
(Italy) ME Camerin (Slovenia) A Prislan | 7 | 6
(Russia) V Kan (Ukraine) G Poznikhirenko | 5 | 4
(Ukraine) V Ivakhnenko (Russia) M Shamayko | 6^{4} | 6 | [7]
2 | (Belarus) I Kremen (Japan) A Omae | 7^{7} | 4 | [10]

Quarterfinals
1 | (Poland) P Kania (Russia) I Khromacheva | 4 | 7 | [10]
(Russia) O Doroshina (Brazil) L Pigossi | 6 | 5 | [8]
(Belarus) S Pirazhenka (Ukraine) A Shkudun | 5 | 4
(Germany) A Zaja (Slovenia) M Zec Peškirič | 7 | 6
WC | (Georgia (country)) M Chakhnashvili (Georgia (country)) S Kvatsabaia | 4 | 2
(Georgia (country)) E Gorgodze (Georgia (country)) S Shaptava | 6 | 6
(Italy) ME Camerin (Slovenia) A Prislan | 1 | 6 | [10]
2 | (Belarus) I Kremen (Japan) A Omae | 6 | 4 | [6]

Semifinals
1 | (Poland) P Kania (Russia) I Khromacheva | 4 | 3
(Germany) A Zaja (Slovenia) M Zec Peškirič | 6 | 6
(Georgia (country)) E Gorgodze (Georgia (country)) S Shaptava | 4 | 4
(Italy) ME Camerin (Slovenia) A Prislan | 6 | 6

Final
(Germany) A Zaja (Slovenia) M Zec Peškirič | 5 | 2
(Italy) ME Camerin (Slovenia) A Prislan | 7 | 6
