= 2011 Telavi Open =

- Date: 26 September–2 October
- Edition: 4th
- Location: Telavi, Georgia

Champions

Singles
- (Russia) Alexandra Panova

Doubles
- (Romania) Elena Bogdan / (Romania) Mihaela Buzărnescu
← 2010 ·	Telavi Open	· 2012 →

The 2011 Telavi Open was a professional tennis tournament played on clay courts. It was the fourth edition of the tournament which was part of the 2011 ITF Women's Circuit. It took place in Telavi, Georgia between 26 September and 2 October 2011.

== WTA entrants ==
=== Seeds ===
Country	Player	Rank^{1}	Seed
ROU	Alexandra Cadanțu	113	1
RUS	Anastasia Pivovarova	128	2
UKR	Lesia Tsurenko	134	3
RUS	Alexandra Panova	141	4
ROU	Mihaela Buzărnescu	157	5
GEO	Margalita Chakhnashvili	175	6
ROU	Elena Bogdan	177	7
ITA	Corinna Dentoni	193	8

- ^{1} Rankings are as of September 19, 2011.

=== Other entrants ===
The following players received wildcards into the singles main draw:

- (Georgia (country)) Ekaterine Gorgodze
- (Ukraine) Olga Ianchuk
- (Georgia (country)) Tatia Mikadze
- (Ukraine) Elina Svitolina

The following players received entry from the qualifying draw:

- (Russia) Alexandra Artamonova
- (Italy) Anastasia Grymalska
- (Ukraine) Elizaveta Ianchuk
- (Chile) Andrea Koch Benvenuto

== Champions ==
=== Singles ===
(Russia) Alexandra Panova def. (Romania) Alexandra Cadanțu, 4–6, 6–1, 6–1

=== Doubles ===
(Romania) Elena Bogdan / (Romania) Mihaela Buzărnescu def. (Georgia (country)) Ekaterine Gorgodze / (Italy) Anastasia Grymalska, 1–6, 6–1, [10–3]
