= 2012 Royal Cup NLB Montenegro =

- Date: 17–23 September
- Edition: 9th
- Location: Podgorica, Montenegro

Champions

Singles
- (Czech Republic) Renata Voráčová

Doubles
- (Italy) Nicole Clerico / (Germany) Anna Zaja
← 2011 ·	Royal Cup NLB Montenegro	· 2013 →

The 2012 Royal Cup NLB Montenegro was a professional tennis tournament played on clay courts. It was the ninth edition of the tournament which was part of the 2012 ITF Women's Circuit. It took place in Podgorica, Montenegro on 17–23 September 2012.

== WTA entrants ==
=== Seeds ===
Country	Player	Rank^{1}	Seed
AUT	Yvonne Meusburger	124	1
GER	Dinah Pfizenmaier	126	2
ITA	Karin Knapp	135	3
UKR	Elina Svitolina	154	4
ITA	Maria Elena Camerin	181	5
CRO	Tereza Mrdeža	184	6
NED	Richèl Hogenkamp	202	7
ROU	Mihaela Buzărnescu	210	8

- ^{1} Rankings are as of 10 September 2012.

=== Other entrants ===
The following players received wildcards into the singles main draw:

- (Slovenia) Andreja Klepač
- (Slovenia) Maša Marc
- (Serbia) Andjela Novčić
- (Germany) Dejana Raickovic

The following players received entry from the qualifying draw:

- (Croatia) Ema Mikulčić
- (Slovakia) Karin Morgošová
- (Serbia) Teodora Mirčić
- (Germany) Anna Zaja

The following players received by a lucky loser spot:

- (Serbia) Natalija Kostić
- (Croatia) Karla Popović

The following player received by a Special Ranking:

- (Czech Republic) Renata Voráčová

== Champions ==
=== Singles ===
- (Czech Republic) Renata Voráčová def. (Italy) Maria Elena Camerin, 3–6, 6–2, 6–0

=== Doubles ===
- (Italy) Nicole Clerico / (Germany) Anna Zaja def. (Argentina) Mailen Auroux / (Argentina) María Irigoyen, 4–6, 6–3, [11–9]
