= 2012 Royal Cup NLB Montenegro – Singles =

Singles
- 2012 Royal Cup NLB Montenegro

Final
- Champion: (Czech Republic) Renata Voráčová
- Runner-up: (Italy) Maria Elena Camerin
- Score: 3–6, 6–2, 6–0

Events
Singles	Doubles
← 2011 ·	Royal Cup NLB Montenegro	· 2013 →

Paula Ormaechea was the defending champion, but chose not to participate.

Renata Voráčová won the title, defeating Maria Elena Camerin in the final, 3–6, 6–2, 6–0.

== Seeds ==
1. (Austria) Yvonne Meusburger (semifinals)
2. (Germany) Dinah Pfizenmaier (first round)
3. (Italy) Karin Knapp (quarterfinals)
4. (Ukraine) Elina Svitolina (first round)
5. (Italy) Maria Elena Camerin (final)
6. (Croatia) Tereza Mrdeža (quarterfinals)
7. (Netherlands) Richèl Hogenkamp (first round)
8. (Romania) Mihaela Buzărnescu (first round)

== Main draw ==
=== Key ===
- Q = Qualifier
- WC = Wild card
- LL = Lucky loser
- Alt = Alternate
- SE = Special exempt
- PR = Protected ranking
- ITF = ITF entry
- JE = Junior exempt
- w/o = Walkover
- r = Retired
- d = Defaulted
- SR = Special ranking

=== Finals ===
Semifinals
1	(Austria) Yvonne Meusburger	2	5
5	(Italy) Maria Elena Camerin	6	7
(Montenegro) Danka Kovinić	2	2
SR	(Czech Republic) Renata Voráčová	6	6

Final
5	(Italy) Maria Elena Camerin	6	2	0
SR	(Czech Republic) Renata Voráčová	3	6	6

=== Top half ===
First round
1	(Austria) Y Meusburger	7^{7}	7
(Germany) C Witthöft	6^{2}	5
(Argentina) M Irigoyen	3	2
(Romania) C Mitu	6	6
LL	(Serbia) N Kostić	3	0^{r}
(Argentina) M Auroux	6	2
(Spain) I Ferrer Suárez	2	4
6	(Croatia) T Mrdeža	6	6
3	(Italy) K Knapp	3	6	6
(Romania) E Bogdan	6	1	1
(Liechtenstein) S Vogt	7	3	6
LL	(Croatia) K Popović	5	6	0
Q	(Slovakia) K Morgošová	7	6
WC	(Serbia) A Novčić	5	2
Q	(Croatia) E Mikulčić	7^{7}	0	2
5	(Italy) ME Camerin	6^{3}	6	6

Second round
1	(Austria) Y Meusburger	6	6
(Romania) C Mitu	3	2
(Argentina) M Auroux	3	3
6	(Croatia) T Mrdeža	6	6
3	(Italy) K Knapp	6	7
(Liechtenstein) S Vogt	2	5
Q	(Slovakia) K Morgošová	4	6	0
5	(Italy) ME Camerin	6	1	6

Quarterfinals
1	(Austria) Y Meusburger	3	7^{7}	7
6	(Croatia) T Mrdeža	6	6^{4}	5
3	(Italy) K Knapp	6	6^{3}	4
5	(Italy) ME Camerin	3	7^{7}	6

Semifinals
1	(Austria) Y Meusburger	2	5
5	(Italy) ME Camerin	6	7

=== Bottom half ===
First round
8	(Romania) M Buzărnescu	2	7^{7}	5
(Romania) R Olaru	6	6^{5}	7
(Germany) A-L Friedsam	6	6
WC	(Germany) D Raickovic	1	3
Q	(Serbia) T Mirčić	6	3	5
(Slovakia) K Kučová	4	6	7
(Montenegro) D Kovinić	6	6
4	(Ukraine) E Svitolina	4	1
7	(Netherlands) R Hogenkamp	1	2
SR	(Czech Republic) R Voráčová	6	6
(Slovakia) AK Schmiedlová	6	7
WC	(Slovenia) M Marc	4	5
(Belarus) I Kremen	7^{7}	1	0
Q	(Germany) A Zaja	6^{3}	6	6
WC	(Slovenia) A Klepač	6	6
2	(Germany) D Pfizenmaier	2	1

Second round
(Romania) R Olaru	6	1	3
(Germany) A-L Friedsam	2	6	6
(Slovakia) K Kučová	2	7^{8}	4
(Montenegro) D Kovinić	6	6^{6}	6
SR	(Czech Republic) R Voráčová	6	6
(Slovakia) AK Schmiedlová	2	4
Q	(Germany) A Zaja	6	6
WC	(Slovenia) A Klepač	4	1

Quarterfinals
(Germany) A-L Friedsam	3	3
(Montenegro) D Kovinić	6	6
SR	(Czech Republic) R Voráčová	6	6
Q	(Germany) A Zaja	2	0

Semifinals
(Montenegro) D Kovinić	2	2
SR	(Czech Republic) R Voráčová	6	6
