= 2011 Telavi Open – Doubles =

Doubles
- 2011 Telavi Open

Final
- Champions: (Romania) Elena Bogdan (Romania) Mihaela Buzărnescu
- Runners-up: (Georgia (country)) Ekaterine Gorgodze (Italy) Anastasia Grymalska
- Score: 1–6, 6–1, [10–3]

Events
| Singles | Doubles |
| ← 2010 · | Telavi Open | · 2012 → |

Veronika Kapshay and Ágnes Szatmári were the defending champions, but Szatmári chose not to participate. Kapshay partnered up with Julia Cohen but lost in the first round to Tatia Mikadze and Sofia Shapatava.
Elena Bogdan and Mihaela Buzărnescu won the title, defeating Ekaterine Gorgodze and Anastasia Grymalska, 1–6, 6–1, [10–3] in the final.

== Seeds ==
1. (Romania) Elena Bogdan / (Romania) Mihaela Buzărnescu (champions)
2. (Romania) Ioana Raluca Olaru / (Ukraine) Lesia Tsurenko (quarterfinals)
3. (United States) Julia Cohen / (Ukraine) Veronika Kapshay (first round)
4. (Ukraine) Irina Buryachok / (Hungary) Réka-Luca Jani (semifinals)

== Draw ==
=== Key ===
- Q = Qualifier
- WC = Wild card
- LL = Lucky loser
- Alt = Alternate
- SE = Special exempt
- PR = Protected ranking
- ITF = ITF entry
- JE = Junior exempt
- w/o = Walkover
- r = Retired
- d = Defaulted
- SR = Special ranking

=== Draw ===
First round
1 | (Romania) E Bogdan (Romania) M Buzărnescu | 6 | 6
(Turkey) Ç Büyükakçay (Austria) N Hofmanova | 2 | 4
(Chile) A Koch-Benvenuto (Belarus) P Pekhova | 6 | 6
WC | (Georgia (country)) T Tatishvili (Georgia (country)) M Tchitchashvili | 0 | 0
3 | (United States) J Cohen (Ukraine) V Kapshay | 5 | 1
(Georgia (country)) T Mikadze (Georgia (country)) S Shapatava | 7 | 6
(Italy) C Dentoni (Austria) M Klaffner | 6 | 6
WC | (Georgia (country)) N Gegia (Georgia (country)) A Jikia | 0 | 0
(Croatia) A Mijačika (Slovenia) M Zec Peškirič | 7 | 6
(Ukraine) E Svitolina (Ukraine) M Zanevska | 5 | 4
WC | (Russia) N Dzalamidze (Ukraine) O Ianchuk | 4 | 1
4 | (Ukraine) I Buryachok (Hungary) R-L Jani | 6 | 6
(Russia) A Artamonova (Russia) P Monova | 5 | 3
(Georgia (country)) E Gorgodze (Italy) A Grymalska | 7 | 6
(Slovakia) J Čepelová (Slovakia) Z Luknárová | 1 | 5
2 | (Romania) IR Olaru (Ukraine) L Tsurenko | 6 | 7

Quarterfinals
1 | (Romania) E Bogdan (Romania) M Buzărnescu | 6 | 6
(Chile) A Koch-Benvenuto (Belarus) P Pekhova | 4 | 1
(Georgia (country)) T Mikadze (Georgia (country)) S Shapatava | 7^{10} | 7
(Italy) C Dentoni (Austria) M Klaffner | 6^{8} | 5
(Croatia) A Mijačika (Slovenia) M Zec Peškirič | 2 | 4
4 | (Ukraine) I Buryachok (Hungary) R-L Jani | 6 | 6
(Georgia (country)) E Gorgodze (Italy) A Grymalska | 6 | 6
2 | (Romania) IR Olaru (Ukraine) L Tsurenko | 2 | 3

Semifinals
1 | (Romania) E Bogdan (Romania) M Buzărnescu | 7 | 3 | [10]
(Georgia (country)) T Mikadze (Georgia (country)) S Shapatava | 5 | 6 | [7]
4 | (Ukraine) I Buryachok (Hungary) R-L Jani | 4 | 0
(Georgia (country)) E Gorgodze (Italy) A Grymalska | 6 | 6

Final
1 | (Romania) E Bogdan (Romania) M Buzărnescu | 1 | 6 | [10]
(Georgia (country)) E Gorgodze (Italy) A Grymalska | 6 | 1 | [3]
