= 2011 Telavi Open – Singles =

Singles
- 2011 Telavi Open

Final
- Champion: (Russia) Alexandra Panova
- Runner-up: (Romania) Alexandra Cadanțu
- Score: 4–6, 6–1, 6–1

Events
Singles	Doubles
← 2010 ·	Telavi Open	· 2012 →

Melanie Klaffner was the defending champion but lost in the first round to Tatia Mikadze.
Alexandra Panova won the title by defeating Alexandra Cadanțu in the final 4–6, 6–1, 6–1.

== Seeds ==
1. (Romania) Alexandra Cadanțu (final)
2. (Russia) Anastasia Pivovarova (first round)
3. (Ukraine) Lesia Tsurenko (quarterfinals, retired)
4. (Russia) Alexandra Panova (champion)
5. (Romania) Mihaela Buzărnescu (quarterfinals)
6. (Georgia (country)) Margalita Chakhnashvili (semifinals)
7. (Romania) Elena Bogdan (first round)
8. (Italy) Corinna Dentoni (first round)

== Draw ==
=== Key ===
- Q = Qualifier
- WC = Wild card
- LL = Lucky loser
- Alt = Alternate
- SE = Special exempt
- PR = Protected ranking
- ITF = ITF entry
- JE = Junior exempt
- w/o = Walkover
- r = Retired
- d = Defaulted
- SR = Special ranking

=== Finals ===
Semifinals
1	(Romania) Alexandra Cadanțu	6	6
JE	(Russia) Irina Khromacheva	3	2
4	(Russia) Alexandra Panova	6	6
6	(Georgia (country)) Margalita Chakhnashvili	2	3

Final
1	(Romania) Alexandra Cadanțu	6	1	1
4	(Russia) Alexandra Panova	4	6	6

=== Top half ===
First round
1	(Romania) A Cadanțu	6	6
(Bosnia and Herzegovina) J Tinjić	4	2
(Austria) N Hofmanova	4	6	2
WC	(Ukraine) E Svitolina	6	1	6
(Ukraine) V Kapshay	0	3
(United States) J Cohen	6	6
(Georgia (country)) S Shapatava	4	6	7
8	(Italy) C Dentoni	6	3	5
3	(Ukraine) L Tsurenko	7	7^{7}
Q	(Chile) A Koch-Benvenuto	5	6^{1}
WC	(Georgia (country)) E Gorgodze	4	6	2
(Croatia) A Mijačika	6	3	6
(Hungary) R-L Jani	3	4
JE	(Russia) I Khromacheva	6	6
(Turkey) Ç Büyükakçay	2	6	6
7	(Romania) E Bogdan	6	3	1

Second round
1	(Romania) A Cadanțu	7^{7}	6
WC	(Ukraine) E Svitolina	6^{4}	4
(United States) J Cohen	5	7^{7}	6
(Georgia (country)) S Shapatava	7	6^{5}	0
3	(Ukraine) L Tsurenko	1	6	6
(Croatia) A Mijačika	6	2	1
JE	(Russia) I Khromacheva	7^{7}	6^{2}	6
(Turkey) Ç Büyükakçay	6^{5}	7^{7}	4

Quarterfinals
1	(Romania) A Cadanțu	2	6	6
(United States) J Cohen	6	4	4
3	(Ukraine) L Tsurenko	5	1^{r}
JE	(Russia) I Khromacheva	7	1

Semifinals
1	(Romania) A Cadanțu	6	6
JE	(Russia) I Khromacheva	3	2

=== Bottom half ===
First round
5	(Romania) M Buzărnescu	6	6
Q	(Italy) A Grymalska	1	3
Q	(Russia) A Artamonova	1	4
(Lithuania) L Stančiūtė	6	6
(France) N Piquion	7	1	3
Q	(Ukraine) E Ianchuk	5	6	6
(Slovenia) M Zec Peškirič	4	3
4	(Russia) A Panova	6	6
6	(Georgia (country)) M Chakhnashvili	3	6	7^{7}
(Ukraine) I Buryachok	6	4	6^{1}
(Romania) IR Olaru	6	7
WC	(Ukraine) O Ianchuk	2	5
(Austria) M Klaffner	4	4
WC	(Georgia (country)) T Mikadze	6	6
(Slovakia) J Čepelová	6^{4}	6	6
2	(Russia) A Pivovarova	7^{7}	2	2

Second round
5	(Romania) M Buzărnescu	6	6
(Lithuania) L Stančiūtė	4	4
Q	(Ukraine) E Ianchuk	6	4	1
4	(Russia) A Panova	1	6	6
6	(Georgia (country)) M Chakhnashvili	6^{4}	7^{7}	6
(Romania) IR Olaru	7^{7}	6^{4}	2
WC	(Georgia (country)) T Mikadze	2	3
(Slovakia) J Čepelová	6	6

Quarterfinals
5	(Romania) M Buzărnescu	2	6^{3}
4	(Russia) A Panova	6	7^{7}
6	(Georgia (country)) M Chakhnashvili	6	3	6
(Slovakia) J Čepelová	4	6	2

Semifinals
4	(Russia) A Panova	6	6
6	(Georgia (country)) M Chakhnashvili	2	3
