= 2012 Telavi Open – Doubles =

Doubles
- 2012 Telavi Open

Final
- Champions: (Hungary) Réka-Luca Jani (Germany) Christina Shakovets
- Runners-up: (Belarus) Ekaterina Dzehalevich (Georgia (country)) Oksana Kalashnikova
- Score: 3–6, 6–4, [10–6]

Events
Singles	Doubles
- Telavi Open

Elena Bogdan and Mihaela Buzărnescu were the defending champions, but both players chose not to participate.

Réka-Luca Jani and Christina Shakovets won the title, defeating Ekaterina Dzehalevich and Oksana Kalashnikova in the final, 3–6, 6–4, [10–6].

== Seeds ==
1. (Ukraine) Lyudmyla Kichenok / (Ukraine) Nadiya Kichenok (first round)
2. (Spain) Leticia Costas / (Spain) Arantxa Parra Santonja (semifinals)
3. (Spain) Inés Ferrer Suárez / (Netherlands) Richèl Hogenkamp (first round)
4. (Georgia (country)) Ekaterine Gorgodze / (Italy) Anastasia Grymalska (withdrew)

== Draw ==
Key

- Q = Qualifier
- WC = Wild card
- LL = Lucky loser
- Alt = Alternate
- ITF = ITF entry
- PR = Protected ranking
- SR = Special ranking
- SE = Special exempt
- JE = Junior exempt
- JR = Junior Accelerator Programme entrant
- CO = College Accelerator Programme entrant
- NG = Next Gen Accelerator Program entrant
- w/o = Walkover
- r = Retired
- d = Defaulted

First round
1	(Ukraine) L Kichenok (Ukraine) N Kichenok	4	2
(Belarus) E Dzehalevich (Georgia (country)) O Kalashnikova	6	6
(Russia) I Khromacheva (Ukraine) E Svitolina	6	6
(Georgia (country)) M Chakhnashvili (Georgia (country)) S Kvatsabaia	3	1
3	(Spain) I Ferrer Suárez (Netherlands) R Hogenkamp	2	7	[8]
(Ukraine) E Ianchuk (Belarus) A Sasnovich	6	5	[10]
WC	(Georgia (country)) M Tchitchashvili (Russia) E Tsiklauri	0	1
(Slovenia) T Majerič (Ukraine) A Shkudun	6	6
WC	(Georgia (country)) M Kurasbediani (Georgia (country)) B Machaidze	0	1
(Hungary) R-L Jani (Germany) C Shakovets	6	6
(Romania) R Olaru (Ukraine) L Tsurenko	6	6
Alt	(Sweden) H Melander (Sweden) P Milosavljevic	3	1
(Belarus) D Lebesheva (Georgia (country)) S Shapatava	6	6
WC	(Georgia (country)) T Chalaganidze (Georgia (country)) A Gogvadze	1	2
(Serbia) A Krunić (Russia) M Lazareva	4	4
2	(Spain) L Costas (Spain) A Parra Santonja	6	6

Quarterfinals
(Belarus) E Dzehalevich (Georgia (country)) O Kalashnikova	6	2	[10]
(Russia) I Khromacheva (Ukraine) E Svitolina	4	6	[7]
(Ukraine) E Ianchuk (Belarus) A Sasnovich	7	7^{9}
(Slovenia) T Majerič (Ukraine) A Shkudun	5	6^{7}
(Hungary) R-L Jani (Germany) C Shakovets	6	6^{3}	[12]
(Romania) R Olaru (Ukraine) L Tsurenko	4	7^{7}	[10]
(Belarus) D Lebesheva (Georgia (country)) S Shapatava	1	6^{5}
2	(Spain) L Costas (Spain) A Parra Santonja	6	7^{7}

Semifinals
(Belarus) E Dzehalevich (Georgia (country)) O Kalashnikova	6	6
(Ukraine) E Ianchuk (Belarus) A Sasnovich	4	0
(Hungary) R-L Jani (Germany) C Shakovets	6	6
2	(Spain) L Costas (Spain) A Parra Santonja	2	3

Final
(Belarus) E Dzehalevich (Georgia (country)) O Kalashnikova	6	4	[6]
(Hungary) R-L Jani (Germany) C Shakovets	3	6	[10]
