= Christina Shakovets =

German tennis player

- Country (sports): Germany
- Born: 29 April 1994 (age 30); Lörrach, Germany
- Prize money: $69,023

Singles
- Career record: 154–136
- Career titles: 2 ITF
- Highest ranking: No. 450 (16 July 2012)

Doubles
- Career record: 153–105
- Career titles: 16 ITF
- Highest ranking: No. 164 (21 July 2014)

Christina Shakovets (born 29 April 1994) is a German former tennis player.

Shakovets won two singles and 16 doubles titles on the ITF Women's Circuit in her career. On 16 July 2012, she reached her best singles ranking of world No. 450. On 21 July 2014, she peaked at No. 164 in the doubles rankings.

Partnering Réka Luca Jani, Shakovets won her first $50k tournament at the 2012 Telavi Open, defeating Ekaterina Dzehalevich and Oksana Kalashnikova in the final.

== ITF Circuit finals ==
=== Singles (2–3) ===
| Legend $100,000 tournaments $75,000 tournaments $50,000 tournaments $25,000 tournaments $10,000 tournaments | Finals by surface Hard (1–2) Clay (1–1) Grass (0–0) Carpet (0–0) |

| Outcome | No. | Date | Tournament | Surface | Opponent | Score |
|---|---|---|---|---|---|---|
| Winner | 1. | 14 February 2011 | Antalya, Turkey | Clay | (Serbia) Teodora Mirčić | 6–4, 6–1 |
| Winner | 2. | 1 August 2011 | Istanbul, Turkey | Hard | (Romania) Diana Stomlega | 6–2, 6–1 |
| Runner-up | 1. | 8 August 2011 | Istanbul, Turkey | Hard | (Hungary) Réka Luca Jani | 4–6, 1–6 |
| Runner-up | 2. | 29 August 2011 | Trimbach, Switzerland | Clay | (Czech Republic) Kateřina Vaňková | 3–6, 2–6 |
| Runner-up | 3. | 5 September 2011 | Antalya, Turkey | Hard | (United States) Hsu Chieh-yu | 4–6, 0–6 |

=== Doubles (16–16) ===
| Legend $50,000 tournaments $25,000 tournaments $15,000 tournaments $10,000 tournaments | Finals by surface Hard (5–6) Clay (11–10) Grass (0–0) Carpet (0–0) |

| Outcome | No. | Date | Tournament | Surface | Partner | Opponents | Score |
|---|---|---|---|---|---|---|---|
| Runner-up | 1. | 25 April 2011 | Zell am Harmersbach, Germany | Clay | (Germany) Désirée Schelenz | (Netherlands) Marcella Koek (Netherlands) Eva Wacanno | 1–6, 4–6 |
| Runner-up | 2. | 13 June 2011 | Cologne, Germany | Clay | (Germany) Carolin Daniels | (Germany) Vanessa Henke (Germany) Anna Zaja | 6–1, 3–6, 4–6 |
| Runner-up | 3. | 18 July 2011 | Horb, Germany | Clay | (Hungary) Vaszilisza Bulgakova | (Poland) Paula Kania (Poland) Katarzyna Kawa | 6–1, 3–6, 4–6 |
| Runner-up | 4. | 1 August 2011 | Istanbul, Turkey | Hard | (Ukraine) Khristina Kazimova | (France) Irina Ramialison (Bulgaria) Isabella Shinikova | 6–3, 1–6, 4–6 |
| Winner | 1. | 15 August 2011 | Istanbul, Turkey | Hard | (India) Ashvarya Shrivastava | (United Kingdom) Tara Moore (United Kingdom) Lisa Whybourn | 6–1, 6–3 |
| Winner | 2. | 29 August 2011 | Trimbach, Switzerland | Clay | (Switzerland) Xenia Knoll | (Australia) Marisa Gianotti (Czech Republic) Kateřina Kramperová | 6–3, 7–6^{(5)} |
| Runner-up | 5. | 5 September 2011 | Antalya, Turkey | Hard | (Portugal) Magali de Lattre | (Turkey) Hülya Esen (Turkey) Lütfiye Esen | 5–7, 5–7 |
| Winner | 3. | 19 September 2011 | Athens, Greece | Clay | (Hungary) Vanda Lukács | (Poland) Natalia Siedliska (Poland) Sylwia Zagórska | 6–3, 6–2 |
| Runner-up | 6. | 6 February 2012 | Sharm El Sheikh, Egypt | Hard | (Spain) Rocío de la Torre Sánchez | (Russia) Natela Dzalamidze (Ukraine) Khristina Kazimova | 4–6, 5–7 |
| Winner | 4. | 23 July 2012 | Bad Waltersdorf, Austria | Clay | (Hungary) Réka Luca Jani | (Australia) Alexandra Nancarrow (Austria) Katharina Negrin | 6–2, 6–0 |
| Runner-up | 7. | 30 July 2012 | Vienna, Austria | Clay | (Ukraine) Sofiya Kovalets | (Russia) Natela Dzalamidze (Ukraine) Anna Shkudun | 4–6, 5–7 |
| Winner | 5. | 3 September 2012 | Belgrade, Serbia | Clay | (Slovenia) Anja Prislan | (Slovakia) Lucia Butkovská (Romania) Camelia Hristea | 6–3, 6–3 |
| Winner | 6. | 24 September 2012 | Telavi, Georgia | Clay | (Hungary) Réka Luca Jani | (Belarus) Ekaterina Dzehalevich (Georgia (country)) Oksana Kalashnikova | 3–6, 6–4, [10–6] |
| Runner-up | 8. | 22 October 2012 | Dubrovnik, Croatia | Clay | (Slovakia) Lucia Butkovská | (Czech Republic) Barbora Krejčíková (Czech Republic) Tereza Malíková | 5–7, 6–7^{(5)} |
| Winner | 7. | 17 June 2013 | Istanbul, Turkey | Hard | (Bulgaria) Julia Stamatova | (Russia) Polina Leykina (Belarus) Lidziya Marozava | 6–2, 6–0 |
| Runner-up | 9. | 15 July 2013 | Darmstadt, Germany | Clay | (Slovenia) Maša Zec Peškirič | (Russia) Alexandra Artamonova (Russia) Natela Dzalamidze | 3–6, 6–7^{(5)} |
| Runner-up | 10. | 12 August 2013 | Craiova, Romania | Clay | (Romania) Diana Buzean | (Italy) Alice Balducci (Poland) Katarzyna Kawa | 6–3, 6–7^{(3)}, [8–10] |
| Winner | 8. | 19 August 2013 | İzmir, Turkey | Hard | (Ukraine) Khristina Kazimova | (Turkey) İpek Soylu (Bulgaria) Julia Stamatova | 6–4, 6–1 |
| Winner | 9. | 26 August 2013 | Mamaia, Romania | Clay | (Kazakhstan) Kamila Kerimbayeva | (Romania) Diana Buzean (Spain) Inés Ferrer Suárez | 6–3, 7–5 |
| Runner-up | 11. | 2 September 2013 | Trabzon, Turkey | Hard | (Ukraine) Alona Fomina | (Ukraine) Yuliya Beygelzimer (Ukraine) Maryna Zanevska | 3–6, 1–6 |
| Runner-up | 12. | 16 September 2013 | Batumi, Georgia | Hard | (Ukraine) Alona Fomina | (Ukraine) Valentyna Ivakhnenko (Ukraine) Kateryna Kozlova | 0–6, 4–6 |
| Winner | 10. | 11 November 2013 | Sharm El Sheikh, Egypt | Hard | (Ukraine) Alona Fomina | (Italy) Giulia Bruzzone (France) Pauline Payet | 7–5, 6–4 |
| Runner-up | 13. | 19 May 2014 | Bol, Croatia | Clay | (Ukraine) Olga Ianchuk | (Finland) Emma Laine (Russia) Eugeniya Pashkova | 4–6, 0–6 |
| Runner-up | 14. | 2 June 2014 | Bol, Croatia | Clay | (Ukraine) Olga Ianchuk | (Czech Republic) Lenka Kunčíková (Czech Republic) Karolína Stuchlá | 6–0, 1–6, [8–10] |
| Winner | 11. | 11 August 2014 | Telavi, Georgia | Clay | (Ukraine) Alona Fomina | (Armenia) Ani Amiraghyan (Russia) Margarita Lazareva | 6–4, 4–6, [10–7] |
| Winner | 12. | 25 August 2014 | Antalya, Turkey | Hard | (Ukraine) Alona Fomina | (China) Wang Yan (China) Yang Zhaoxuan | 6–3, 6–1 |
| Winner | 13. | 6 April 2015 | Cairo, Egypt | Clay | (Spain) Arabela Fernández Rabener | (Russia) Alina Mikheeva (Hungary) Naomi Totka | 6–4, 6–2 |
| Winner | 14. | 18 May 2015 | Bol, Croatia | Clay | (North Macedonia) Lina Gjorcheska | (Switzerland) Karin Kennel (Croatia) Iva Primorac | 4–6, 6–2, [10–2] |
| Runner-up | 15. | 9 November 2015 | Antalya, Turkey | Clay | (Ukraine) Alona Fomina | (North Macedonia) Lina Gjorcheska (Croatia) Iva Primorac | 4–6, 6–4, [11–13] |
| Winner | 15. | 30 November 2015 | Antalya, Turkey | Clay | (Ukraine) Alyona Sotnikova | (Ukraine) Alona Fomina (Georgia (country)) Sofia Kvatsabaia | 7–5, 6–4 |
| Winner | 16. | 7 December 2015 | Antalya, Turkey | Clay | (Ukraine) Alona Fomina | (Denmark) Julie Noe (Romania) Elena Ruse | 7–6^{(4)}, 6–2 |
| Runner-up | 16. | 6 June 2016 | Acre, Israel | Hard | (Ukraine) Veronika Stotyka | (Israel) Vlada Ekshibarova (Hungary) Naomi Totka | 0–6, 6–3, [6–10] |
