= 2012 Royal Cup NLB Montenegro – Doubles =

Doubles
- 2012 Royal Cup NLB Montenegro

Final
- Champions: (Italy) Nicole Clerico (Germany) Anna Zaja
- Runners-up: (Argentina) Mailen Auroux (Argentina) María Irigoyen
- Score: 4–6, 6–3, [11–9]

Events
Singles	Doubles
← 2011 ·	Royal Cup NLB Montenegro	· 2013 →

Corinna Dentoni and Florencia Molinero were the defending champions, but both players chose not to participate.

Nicole Clerico and Anna Zaja won the title, defeating Mailen Auroux and María Irigoyen in the final, 4–6, 6–3, [11–9].

== Seeds ==
1. (Romania) Elena Bogdan / (Czech Republic) Renata Voráčová (first round)
2. (Argentina) Mailen Auroux / (Argentina) María Irigoyen (final)
3. (Spain) Inés Ferrer Suárez / (Netherlands) Richèl Hogenkamp (quarterfinals)
4. (Croatia) Tereza Mrdeža / (Romania) Raluca Olaru (quarterfinals)

== Draw ==
=== Key ===
- Q = Qualifier
- WC = Wild card
- LL = Lucky loser
- Alt = Alternate
- SE = Special exempt
- PR = Protected ranking
- ITF = ITF entry
- JE = Junior exempt
- w/o = Walkover
- r = Retired
- d = Defaulted
- SR = Special ranking

First round
1	(Romania) E Bogdan (Czech Republic) R Voráčová	3	6	[7]
(Italy) N Clerico (Germany) A Zaja	6	2	[10]
(Slovakia) K Morgošová (Slovakia) AK Schmiedlová	4	1
(Germany) A-L Friedsam (Russia) P Leykina	6	6
3	(Spain) I Ferrer Suárez (Netherlands) R Hogenkamp	6	6
(Slovakia) V Juhászová (Belarus) I Kremen	2	0
(Montenegro) D Kovinić (Montenegro) D Krstajić	6	6
WC	(Montenegro) V Babić (Serbia) A Novčić	0	4
WC	(Croatia) E Mikulčić (Germany) D Raickovic	4	5
(Romania) M Buzărnescu (Serbia) T Mirčić	6	7
(Romania) D Marcu (Romania) C Mitu	4	1
4	(Croatia) T Mrdeža (Romania) R Olaru	6	6
WC	(Montenegro) N Brnović (Montenegro) N Bulatović	0	1
(Slovakia) L Butkovská (Slovakia) Z Luknárová	6	6
(Slovakia) K Kučová (Ukraine) E Svitolina	1	2
2	(Argentina) M Auroux (Argentina) M Irigoyen	6	6

Quarterfinals
(Italy) N Clerico (Germany) A Zaja	3	6	[10]
(Germany) A-L Friedsam (Russia) P Leykina	6	0	[7]
3	(Spain) I Ferrer Suárez (Netherlands) R Hogenkamp	4	5
(Montenegro) D Kovinić (Montenegro) D Krstajić	6	7
(Romania) M Buzărnescu (Serbia) T Mirčić	6	3	[10]
4	(Croatia) T Mrdeža (Romania) R Olaru	3	6	[7]
(Slovakia) L Butkovská (Slovakia) Z Luknárová	6	3	[4]
2	(Argentina) M Auroux (Argentina) M Irigoyen	3	6	[10]

Semifinals
(Italy) N Clerico (Germany) A Zaja	6	6^{3}	[10]
(Montenegro) D Kovinić (Montenegro) D Krstajić	4	7^{7}	[8]
(Romania) M Buzărnescu (Serbia) T Mirčić	3	6	[7]
2	(Argentina) M Auroux (Argentina) M Irigoyen	6	2	[10]

Finals
(Italy) N Clerico (Germany) A Zaja	4	6	[11]
2	(Argentina) M Auroux (Argentina) M Irigoyen	6	3	[9]
