= Tsinandali Park =

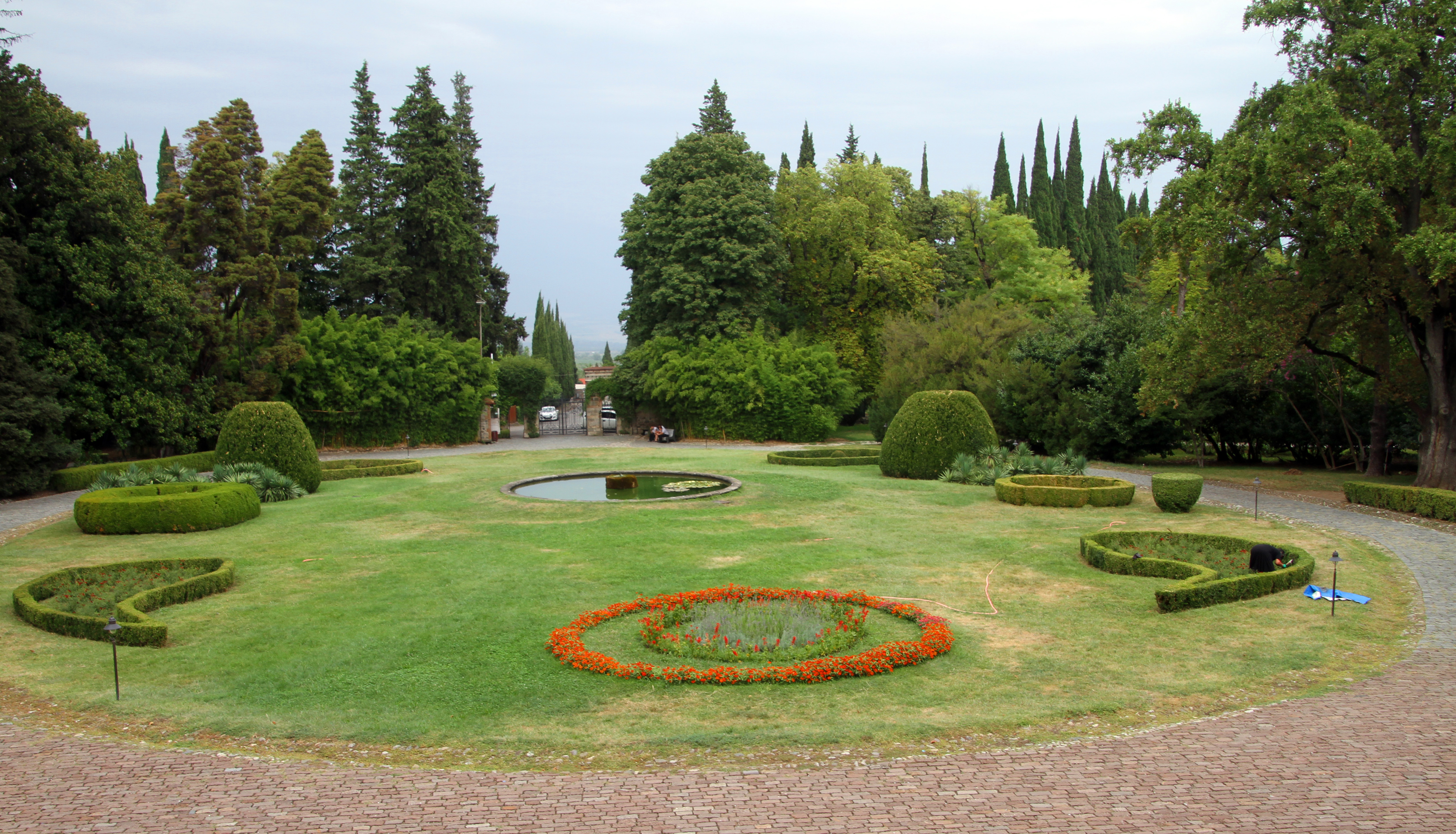
- Panoramic view of the park
- Interactive map of Tsinandali Park
- Location: Kakheti, Georgia
- Coordinates: 41°53′46″N 45°34′01″E
- Area: square

The Tsinandali Park or Aleksandre Chavchavadze complex, is an architectural and historical monument at the village of Tsinandali in the municipality of Telavi about 80 km from Tbilisi, Georgia. The Alexandre Chavchavadze complex was approved by the decree of the President of Georgia in 2006, under the category of Immovable Cultural Monuments of National Importance of Georgia.

== History ==
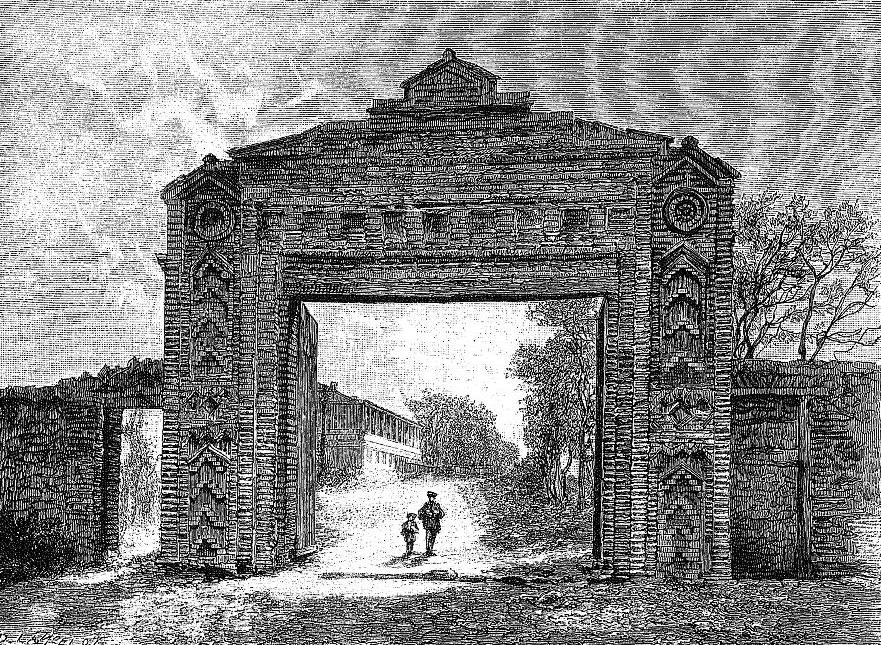
Mansion of Prince David Chavchavadze in Tsinandali

The history of the Tsinandali Chavchavadze complex originates in the 17th century when Heraclius I resettled the ancestors of Chavchavadzes from the village of Chavchavadze, to strengthen the village. In 1680 they settled in Tsinandali. In 1797, Heraclius II of Georgia donated to Garsevan Chavchavadze (Georgian Ambassador to Russia), together with Tsinandali, the villages: Zegaani, Napareuli and Muganlo. The first building was built in 1818, and in 1831 the second. In 1829, the water pump was built and obtained 12 hectares of the wooded area, where the garden-park was made in 1835 by European decorators. In 1840, Alexander Chavchavadze built a winery. Its name is associated with the introduction of new vines and the implementation of technological innovations in winemaking, the highly regarded dry white Tsinandali, is still produced there. By this period, the romantic poet's hometown became a meeting place for the main Georgian and European cultures.

After the death of Alexander Chavchavadze in 1846, the land of Tsinandali was inherited by his son David. In 1854, during the Shamil attack in Tsinandali, the palace and the library were destroyed along with part of the park. Family members of Aleksandre Chavchavadze were kidnapped. This event shocked not only Russia, but also the West. On March 22, 1855, after complicated negotiations, the hostages were exchanged for Shamil's captive son, Jamal al-Din, and 40,000 rubles of silver as part of an agreement involving a general exchange of prisoners. Afterward David Chavchavadze restored his property and in 1886 he bought the department of the Russian Imperial Houses and began the reconstruction. The land was ruled by P. Bacauut, during this period the current palace was built. In 1886–1887, a new water supply was built and the largest wine factory in the Russian Empire of that period, in addition to its architectural value.

In 1946, the poet's museum was inaugurated by Giorgi Leonidze, an academic at the Georgia Academy of Sciences, to celebrate the centenary of Alexander Chavchavadze's death.

== Napareuli Chavchavadze Estate ==
In 1797, King Erekle granted to Garsevan Chavchavadze, a well-known statesman, estates in the village Napareuli as well as the Tsinandali estate. Napareuli is located in Khaketi, approximately 10 minutes drive from Tsinandali. After his death, his son Aleksandre Chavchavadze took care of these estates, who became particularly skilled at managing the vineyards and developed special wine production techniques. Aleksandre carried out several reforms that were helpful to improve the quality of the vineyards as well as wines. The estate in Napareuli is still visible today, located near the Twins Wine House, although the original estate buildings remain in a derelict state.
