= Telavi Open =

ITF Women's Tour
- Event name: Telavi Open
- Location: Telavi, Georgia
- Venue: Telavi Tennis Club
- Category: ITF Women's Circuit
- Surface: Clay
- Draw: 32S/16Q/16D
- Prize money: $25,000
- Website: http://www.tennisgeorgia.ge/

The Telavi Open is a tournament for professional female tennis players. The event is classified as a $25,000 ITF Women's Circuit tournament. It has been held on outdoor clay courts in Telavi, Georgia, since 2007. From 2011 until 2013 the tournament was classified as a $50,000 event on the ITF calendar.

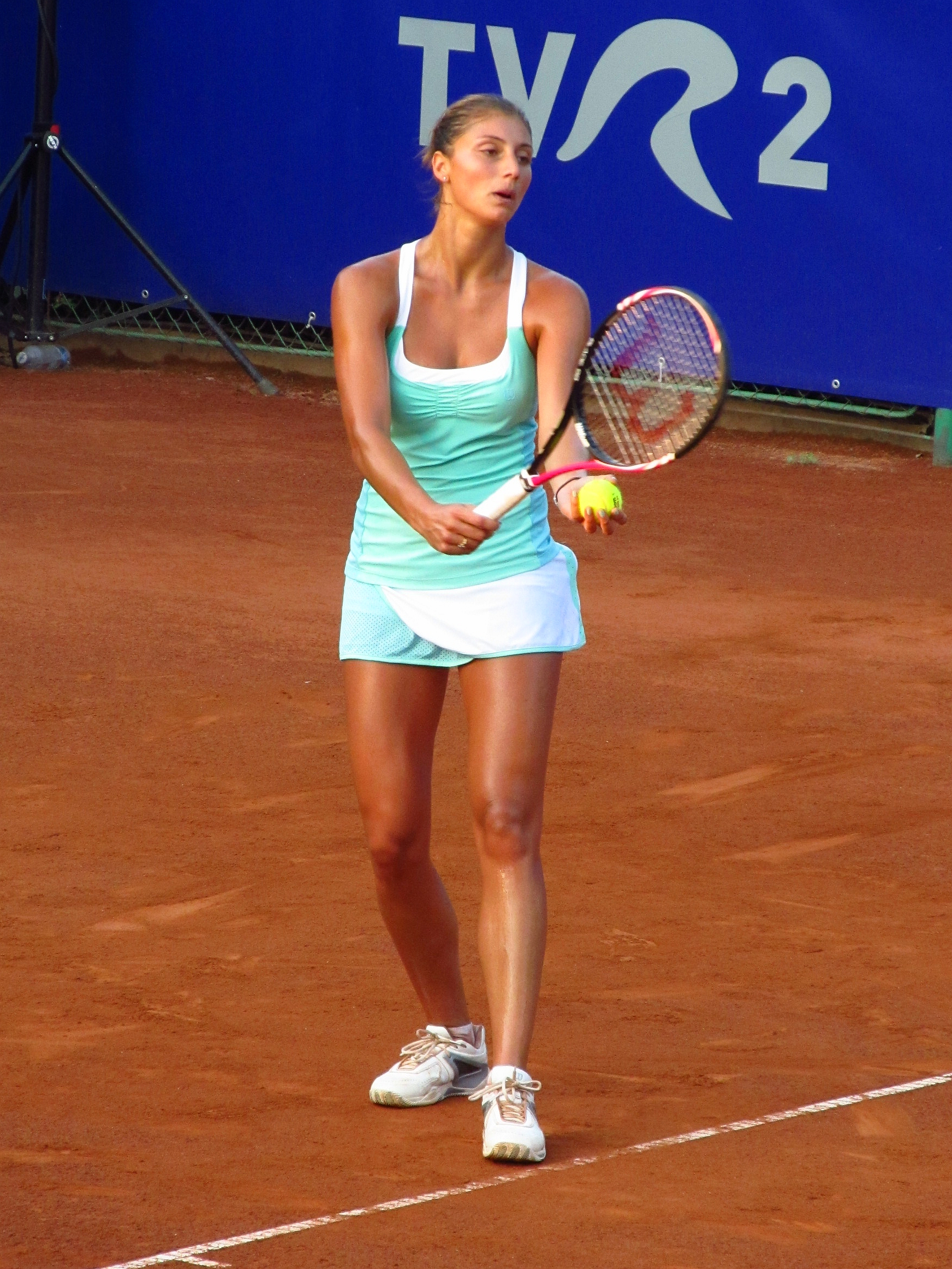
Corinna Dentoni won the inaugural singles event in 2007

== Past finals ==
=== Singles ===
Year	Champion	Runner-up	Score
2021 (2)	(Greece) Valentini Grammatikopoulou	(France) Tessah Andrianjafitrimo	7–5, 6–4
2021 (1)	(Netherlands) Suzan Lamens	(Switzerland) Joanne Züger	7–5, 6–2
2020	tournament cancelled due to the COVID-19 pandemic		
2019 (2)	(Russia) Daria Kudashova	(Romania) Oana Georgeta Simion	6–2, 4–6, 6–4
2019 (1)	(Romania) Oana Georgeta Simion	(Czech Republic) Anna Sisková	6–2, 6–3
2018	(Georgia (country)) Zoziya Kardava	(Russia) Vasilisa Aponasenko	6–2, 6–2
2017	(Georgia (country)) Ekaterine Gorgodze (2)	(Belgium) Margaux Bovy	6–2, 6–0
2016	(Russia) Veronika Kudermetova	(Israel) Deniz Khazaniuk	7–5, 6–4
2015	(Georgia (country)) Ekaterine Gorgodze	(Armenia) Ani Amiraghyan	5–7, 6–2, 6–2
2014	(Russia) Darya Kasatkina	(Italy) Jasmine Paolini	6–1, 4–6, [10–7]
2013	(Russia) Alexandra Panova	(Russia) Victoria Kan	7–5, 6–1
2012	(Ukraine) Elina Svitolina	(Ukraine) Lesia Tsurenko	6–1, 6–2
2011	(Russia) Alexandra Panova	(Romania) Alexandra Cadanțu	4–6, 6–1, 6–1
2010	(Austria) Melanie Klaffner	(Ukraine) Irina Buryachok	3–6, 6–0, 3–0 ret.
2009	(Hungary) Réka Luca Jani	(Austria) Melanie Klaffner	6–2, 6–4
2008	not held		
2007	(Italy) Corinna Dentoni	(Greece) Anna Gerasimou	6–2, 1–6, 6–0

=== Doubles ===
Year	Champions	Runners-up	Score
2021 (2)	(Netherlands) Eva Vedder (Netherlands) Stéphanie Visscher	(Argentina) Victoria Bosio (Italy) Angelica Moratelli	3–6, 6–4, [13–11]
2021 (1)	(North Macedonia) Lina Gjorcheska (Ukraine) Valeriya Strakhova	(Argentina) Victoria Bosio (Italy) Angelica Moratelli	4–6, 6–4, [10–5]
2020	tournament cancelled due to the COVID-19 pandemic		
2019 (2)	(Russia) Margarita Lazareva (Romania) Oana Georgeta Simion	(Russia) Valeriya Olyanovskaya (Russia) Taisya Pachkaleva	6–4, 4–6, [10–8]
2019 (1)	(Romania) Oana Georgeta Simion (Czech Republic) Anna Sisková	(Kazakhstan) Yekaterina Dmitrichenko (Russia) Anna Ureke	6–1, 6–0
2018	(Russia) Nadezda Gorbachkova (Moldova) Julia Helbet	(Turkey) İpek Öz (Turkey) Melis Sezer	1–0 ret.
2017	(Belarus) Polina Pekhova (Russia) Maria Solnyshkina	(Georgia (country)) Mariam Bolkvadze (Georgia (country)) Ekaterine Gorgodze	6–2, 1–6, [10–7]
2016	(Russia) Natela Dzalamidze (Russia) Veronika Kudermetova	(Georgia (country)) Tatia Mikadze (Georgia (country)) Sofia Shapatava	6–4, 6–2
2015	(Armenia) Ani Amiraghyan (Russia) Amina Anshba	(Russia) Polina Golubovskaya (Russia) Alina Kislitskaya	6–1, 6–1
2014	not completed due to bad weather		
2013	(Italy) Maria Elena Camerin (Slovenia) Anja Prislan	(Germany) Anna Zaja (Slovenia) Maša Zec Peškirič	7–5, 6–2
2012	(Hungary) Réka Luca Jani (Germany) Christina Shakovets	(Belarus) Ekaterina Dzehalevich (Georgia (country)) Oksana Kalashnikova	3–6, 6–4, [10–6]
2011	(Romania) Elena Bogdan (Romania) Mihaela Buzărnescu	(Georgia (country)) Ekaterine Gorgodze (Italy) Anastasia Grymalska	1–6, 6–1, [10–3]
2010	(Ukraine) Veronika Kapshay (Romania) Ágnes Szatmári	(Georgia (country)) Oksana Kalashnikova (Austria) Melanie Klaffner	6–1, 2–6, [10–8]
2009	(Netherlands) Chayenne Ewijk (Netherlands) Marlot Meddens	(Georgia (country)) Tatia Mikadze (Georgia (country)) Manana Shapakidze	6–2, 6–4
2008	not held		
2007	(Germany) Ria Dörnemann (Kyrgyzstan) Ksenia Palkina	(Russia) Vasilisa Davydova (Russia) Marina Shamayko	6–2, 6–2
