= Royal Cup NLB Montenegro =

ITF Women's Tour
- Event name: Podgorica
- Location: Donji Kokoti, Podgorica, Montenegro
- Venue: Tennis Club AS-Podgorica
- Category: ITF Women's Circuit
- Surface: Clay / outdoor
- Draw: 32S/32Q/16D
- Prize money: $25,000
- Website: Official website

The Royal Cup NLB Montenegro was a tournament for professional female tennis players played on outdoor clay courts, held in Donji Kokoti, Podgorica, Montenegro, from 2004 to 2019. The event was part of the ITF Women's Circuit and was classified in the $25,000 category. It was previously a $50k event but was downgraded in 2013.

== Past finals ==
=== Singles ===
Year	Champion	Runner-up	Score
2019	(Croatia) Tena Lukas	(Russia) Marina Melnikova	6–4, 7–5
2018	(Czech Republic) Jesika Malečková	(Croatia) Tena Lukas	6–2, 6–0
2017	(Russia) Marina Melnikova	(Czech Republic) Jesika Malečková	6–2, 6–0
2016	(Netherlands) Quirine Lemoine	(Argentina) Paula Ormaechea	7–5, 6–1
2015	(Austria) Barbara Haas	(Serbia) Doroteja Erić	6–3, 6–1
2014	(Romania) Andreea Mitu	(Russia) Vitalia Diatchenko	6–1, 6–4
2013	(Liechtenstein) Stephanie Vogt	(Estonia) Anett Kontaveit	6–4, 6–3
2012	(Czech Republic) Renata Voráčová	(Italy) Maria Elena Camerin	3–6, 6–2, 6–0
2011	(Argentina) Paula Ormaechea	(Montenegro) Danka Kovinić	6–1, 6–1
2010	(Romania) Irina-Camelia Begu	(Italy) Annalisa Bona	6–1, 6–1
2009	(Czech Republic) Renata Voráčová	(Serbia) Ana Timotić	7–5, 2–1 ret.
2008	(Slovenia) Maša Zec Peškirič	(Slovakia) Dominika Nociarová	6–3, 7–6^{(7–1)}
2007	(Czech Republic) Michaela Paštiková	(Slovakia) Martina Suchá	5–7, 7–5, 7–6^{(7–4)}
2006	(Serbia) Ana Veselinović	(Bulgaria) Dia Evtimova	6–4, 7–5
2005	(Bosnia and Herzegovina) Dijana Stojić	(Serbia and Montenegro) Neda Kozić	4–6, 7–5, 6–3
2004	(Germany) Andrea Petković	(Serbia and Montenegro) Dragana Zarić	6–3, 6–3

=== Doubles ===
Year	Champions	Runners-up	Score
2019	(Russia) Amina Anshba (Czech Republic) Anastasia Dețiuc	(Finland) Anastasia Kulikova (Russia) Evgeniya Levashova	2–6, 6–3, [10–7]
2018	(Czech Republic) Miriam Kolodziejová (Slovenia) Nina Potočnik	(Bosnia and Herzegovina) Nefisa Berberović (Slovenia) Veronika Erjavec	2–6, 6–3, [10–0]
2017	(Czech Republic) Petra Krejsová (Czech Republic) Jesika Malečková	(Slovakia) Tereza Mihalíková (Slovakia) Chantal Škamlová	6–2, 6–3
2016	(Bosnia and Herzegovina) Anita Husarić (Netherlands) Quirine Lemoine	(Serbia) Ivana Jorović (Switzerland) Xenia Knoll	3–6, 6–4, [10–4]
2015	(North Macedonia) Lina Gjorcheska (Turkey) Melis Sezer	(Montenegro) Nikoleta Bulatović (Montenegro) Nina Kalezić	6–0, 6–0
2014	(Romania) Alexandra Cadanțu (Liechtenstein) Stephanie Vogt	(Switzerland) Xenia Knoll (Netherlands) Arantxa Rus	6–1, 3–6, [10–2]
2013	(Montenegro) Vladica Babić (Croatia) Iva Mekovec	(Czech Republic) Kateřina Vaňková (Slovenia) Maša Zec Peškirič	6–4, 6–7^{(1–7)}, [10–5]
2012	(Italy) Nicole Clerico (Germany) Anna Zaja	(Argentina) Mailen Auroux (Argentina) María Irigoyen	4–6, 6–3, [11–9]
2011	(Italy) Corinna Dentoni (Argentina) Florencia Molinero	(Montenegro) Danka Kovinić (Montenegro) Danica Krstajić	6–4, 5–7, [10–5]
2010	(Romania) Irina-Camelia Begu (Romania) Mihaela Buzărnescu	(Russia) Valeriya Solovyeva (Ukraine) Maryna Zanevska	5–7, 7–5, [12–10]
2009	(Italy) Nicole Clerico (Poland) Karolina Kosińska	(Serbia) Karolina Jovanović (Serbia) Teodora Mirčić	6–7^{(4–7)}, 6–4, [10–4]
2008	(Serbia) Neda Kozić (Bosnia and Herzegovina) Sandra Martinović	(Argentina) Erica Krauth (Sweden) Hanna Nooni	7–6^{(7–5)}, 6–2
2007	(Montenegro) Danica Krstajić (Bosnia and Herzegovina) Sandra Martinović	(Croatia) Ivana Abramović (Croatia) Maria Abramović	6–1, 6–2
2006	(Croatia) Josipa Bek (Serbia) Karolina Jovanović	(Ukraine) Lyudmyla Kichenok (Ukraine) Nadiya Kichenok	6–4, 5–7, 6–2
2005	(Croatia) Ani Mijačika (Bosnia and Herzegovina) Dijana Stojić	(Serbia and Montenegro) Neda Kozić (Russia) Vesna Manasieva	1–6, 6–3, 6–4
2004	(Germany) Andrea Petković (Russia) Sofia Avakova	(Czech Republic) Janette Bejlková (Bulgaria) Biljana Pawlowa-Dimitrova	6–1, 6–2

== Record ==
=== Titles by player ===
Since first edition of Podgorica tour, Czech player Renata Voráčová is the only participant which won the singles tournament twice (2009, 2012). Among the players which won title in singles and in doubles are Andrea Petković, Dijana Stojić, Irina-Camelia Begu and Stephanie Vogt. Below is the list of players which won at least two tournaments in singles and doubles.

Player	Titles	Singles	Doubles
(Czech Republic) Renata Voráčová	2	2	0
(Germany) Andrea Petković	2	1	1
(Bosnia and Herzegovina) Dijana Stojić	2	1	1
(Romania) Irina-Camelia Begu	2	1	1
(Liechtenstein) Stephanie Vogt	2	1	1
(Bosnia and Herzegovina) Sandra Martinović	2	0	2
(Italy) Nicole Clerico	2	0	2

=== Titles by country ===
By now, tennis players from 16 different countries won the trophy in singles or doubles competition at Royal Cup NLB Montenegro. Most successful were players from Romania, which won five titles. Additionally, more than two titles won players from Bosnia and Herzegovina, Czech Republic, Serbia, Germany, Croatia and Italy. Argentina is the only country out of Europe whose players won the trophy.

Country	Titles	Singles		Doubles	
Country	Titles	WIN	RUN	WIN	RUN
Romania	5	2	0	3	0
Bosnia and Herzegovina	4	1	0	3	0
Czech Republic	3	3	0	0	2
Serbia	3	1	4	2	4
Germany	3	1	0	2	0
Italy	3	0	2	3	0
Croatia	3	0	0	3	2
Argentina	2	1	0	1	3
Liechtenstein	2	1	0	1	0
Montenegro	2	0	1	2	4
Slovenia	1	1	0	0	1
Austria	1	1	0	0	0
Russia	1	0	1	1	2
(North Macedonia) Republic of Macedonia	1	0	0	1	0
Poland	1	0	0	1	0
Turkey	1	0	0	1	0
Slovakia	0	0	2	0	0
Bulgaria	0	0	1	0	1
Estonia	0	0	1	0	0
Ukraine	0	0	0	0	3
Netherlands	0	0	0	0	1
Sweden	0	0	0	0	1
Switzerland	0	0	0	0	1

WIN - winners; RUN - runners-up
