= 2012 Telavi Open – Singles =

Singles
- 2012 Telavi Open

Final
- Champion: (Ukraine) Elina Svitolina
- Runner-up: (Ukraine) Lesia Tsurenko
- Score: 6–1, 6–2

Events
Singles	Doubles
- Telavi Open

Alexandra Panova was the defending champion, but chose not to participate.

Elina Svitolina won the title, defeating Lesia Tsurenko in the final, 6–1, 6–2.

== Seeds ==
1. (Ukraine) Lesia Tsurenko (final)
2. (Ukraine) Elina Svitolina (champion)
3. (Russia) Irina Khromacheva (first round)
4. (Serbia) Aleksandra Krunić (semifinals)
5. (Croatia) Tereza Mrdeža (quarterfinals)
6. (Netherlands) Richèl Hogenkamp (second round)
7. (Italy) Anna Floris (first round)
8. (Germany) Anna-Lena Friedsam (quarterfinals)

== Main draw ==
Key

- Q = Qualifier
- WC = Wild card
- LL = Lucky loser
- Alt = Alternate
- ITF = ITF entry
- PR = Protected ranking
- SR = Special ranking
- SE = Special exempt
- JE = Junior exempt
- JR = Junior Accelerator Programme entrant
- CO = College Accelerator Programme entrant
- NG = Next Gen Accelerator Program entrant
- w/o = Walkover
- r = Retired
- d = Defaulted

=== Finals ===
Semifinals
1	(Ukraine) Lesia Tsurenko	6^{3}	6	6
4	(Serbia) Aleksandra Krunić	7^{7}	4	2
Q	(Ukraine) Anna Shkudun	3	1
2	(Ukraine) Elina Svitolina	6	6

Final
1	(Ukraine) Lesia Tsurenko	1	2
2	(Ukraine) Elina Svitolina	6	6

=== Top half ===
First round
1	(Ukraine) L Tsurenko	6	6
(Spain) L Costas	4	0
Q	(Russia) M Lazareva	6	7^{7}
(Slovenia) T Majerič	3	6^{3}
WC	(Georgia (country)) E Gorgodze	3	6	4
(Georgia (country)) M Chakhnashvili	6	1	6
SE	(Czech Republic) R Voráčová	4	6	2
8	(Germany) A-L Friedsam	6	2	6
4	(Serbia) A Krunić	6	6
(Hungary) R-L Jani	3	4
(Ukraine) N Kichenok	6	7
(Spain) A Parra Santonja	3	5
(Georgia (country)) S Shapatava	6	7^{7}
(Spain) I Ferrer Suárez	1	6^{2}
(Switzerland) C Perrin	6	6
7	(Italy) A Floris	4	0

Second round
1	(Ukraine) L Tsurenko	6	6
Q	(Russia) M Lazareva	3	0
(Georgia (country)) M Chakhnashvili	6^{2}	7	4
8	(Germany) A-L Friedsam	7^{7}	5	6
4	(Serbia) A Krunić	6	6
(Ukraine) N Kichenok	1	3
(Georgia (country)) S Shapatava	4	6	6
(Switzerland) C Perrin	6	3	4

Quarterfinals
1	(Ukraine) L Tsurenko	6	1	6
8	(Germany) A-L Friedsam	2	6	1
4	(Serbia) A Krunić	6	6
(Georgia (country)) S Shapatava	2	4

Semifinals
1	(Ukraine) L Tsurenko	6^{3}	6	6
4	(Serbia) A Krunić	7^{7}	4	2

=== Bottom half ===
First round
6	(Netherlands) R Hogenkamp	6	6
Q	(Russia) V Kan	4	0
(Italy) A Grymalska	5	2^{r}
WC	(Georgia (country)) O Kalashnikova	7	5
Q	(Ukraine) A Shkudun	4	7^{8}	6
WC	(Georgia (country)) N Gegia	6	6^{6}	0
(Romania) R Olaru	6	7
3	(Russia) I Khromacheva	3	5
5	(Croatia) T Mrdeža	6	6
WC	(Georgia (country)) S Kvatsabaia	4	1
(Ukraine) L Kichenok	7	5	6^{3}
(Slovakia) AK Schmiedlová	5	7	7^{7}
(Italy) C Dentoni	6	6
Q	(Ukraine) G Poznikhirenko	0	4
SR	(Belarus) E Dzehalevich	3	1
2	(Ukraine) E Svitolina	6	6

Second round
6	(Netherlands) R Hogenkamp	4	6	6^{5}
WC	(Georgia (country)) O Kalashnikova	6	2	7^{7}
Q	(Ukraine) A Shkudun	6	1	6
(Romania) R Olaru	4	6	4
5	(Croatia) T Mrdeža	1	6	7^{7}
(Slovakia) AK Schmiedlová	6	3	6^{5}
(Italy) C Dentoni	1	4
2	(Ukraine) E Svitolina	6	6

Quarterfinals
WC	(Georgia (country)) O Kalashnikova	1	4
Q	(Ukraine) A Shkudun	6	6
5	(Croatia) T Mrdeža	2	1
2	(Ukraine) E Svitolina	6	6

Semifinals
Q	(Ukraine) A Shkudun	3	1
2	(Ukraine) E Svitolina	6	6
