= Anja Prislan =

Slovenian tennis player

- Country (sports): Slovenia
- Born: 11 December 1985 (age 39); Ljubljana, SR Slovenia, SFR Yugoslavia
- Prize money: $41,257

Singles
- Career record: 118–139
- Career titles: 0
- Highest ranking: No. 460 (17 October 2011)

Doubles
- Career record: 121–127
- Career titles: 7 ITF
- Highest ranking: No. 289 (7 October 2013)

Anja Prislan (born 11 December 1985 in Ljubljana) is a Slovenian former tennis player.

In her career, Prislan won seven doubles titles on the ITF Women's Circuit. On 17 October 2011, she reached her best singles ranking of world No. 460. On 7 October 2013, she peaked at No. 289 in the doubles rankings.

On the WTA Tour, Prislan twice played in the doubles main draw of the Slovenia Open.

== ITF finals ==
=== Singles (0–1) ===
Legend $25,000 tournaments $10,000 tournaments	Finals by surface Hard (0–1) Clay (0–0)

Outcome	No.	Date	Tournament	Surface	Opponent	Score
Runner-up	1.	16 August 2011	ITF Istanbul, Turkey	Hard	(Ukraine) Elina Svitolina	2–6, 7–6^{(5)}, 0–6

=== Doubles (7–16) ===
Legend $50,000 tournaments $25,000 tournaments $15,000 tournaments $10,000 tournaments	Finals by surface Hard (2–5) Clay (4–9) Grass (1–0) Carpet (0–2)

Outcome	No.	Date	Tournament	Surface	Partner	Opponents	Score
Winner	1.	24 April 2006	ITF Cavtat, Croatia	Clay	(Slovenia) Tina Obrez	(Australia) Christina Horiatopoulos (Belgium) Caroline Maes	w/o
Winner	2.	28 August 2006	Palić Open, Serbia and Montenegro	Clay	(Serbia and Montenegro) Miljana Adanko	(Czech Republic) Iveta Gerlová (Germany) Maren Kassens	7–6^{(3)}, 2–6, 7–6^{(5)}
Runner-up	1.	6 November 2006	ITF Mallorca, Spain	Clay	(Slovenia) Tina Obrez	(Italy) Stefania Chieppa (Argentina) María Belén Corbalán	4–6, 7–6^{(3)}, 0–6
Runner-up	2.	13 November 2006	ITF Mallorca, Spain	Clay	(Germany) Laura Siegemund	(Spain) Nuria Sánchez García (Portugal) Neuza Silva	3–6, 1–6
Runner-up	3.	21 May 2007	ITF Gorizia, Italy	Clay	(Italy) Denise Mascherini	(Italy) Stefania Chieppa (Italy) Giulia Gabba	3–6, 0–6
Runner-up	4.	14 April 2008	ITF Bol, Croatia	Clay	(Slovenia) Tina Obrez	(United Kingdom) Naomi Broady (Switzerland) Amra Sadiković	4–6, 3–6
Runner-up	5.	19 May 2008	ITF Gorizia, Italy	Clay	(Slovenia) Maja Kambič	(Croatia) Darija Jurak (Italy) Lisa Sabino	0–6, 1–6
Runner-up	6.	7 July 2008	ITF Prokuplje, Serbia	Clay	(Serbia) Zorica Petrov	(Serbia) Ljubica Avramović (Russia) Valeria Savinykh	w/o
Runner-up	7.	20 July 2009	ITF Horb, Germany	Clay	(Switzerland) Amra Sadiković	(Netherlands) Michelle Gerards (Netherlands) Marcella Koek	6–7^{(6)}, 1–6
Runner-up	8.	11 October 2010	ITF Bol, Croatia	Clay	(Netherlands) Eva Wacanno	(Poland) Katarzyna Kawa (Poland) Natalia Kołat	7–5, 4–6, [8–10]
Runner-up	9.	14 March 2011	ITF Fällanden, Switzerland	Carpet (i)	(Slovenia) Dalila Jakupović	(Switzerland) Xenia Knoll (Switzerland) Amra Sadiković	3–6, 3–6
Winner	3.	28 March 2011	ITF New Delhi, India	Hard	(India) Kyra Shroff	(Austria) Stephanie Hirsch (Austria) Yvonne Neuwirth	6–3, 7–5
Winner	4.	4 April 2011	ITF Lucknow, India	Grass	(India) Kyra Shroff	(India) Aishwarya Agrawal (India) Ankita Raina	6–3, 6–3
Runner-up	10.	2 May 2011	ITF Istanbul, Turkey	Hard	(Bulgaria) Dessislava Mladenova	(Romania) Laura-Ioana Andrei (Georgia (country)) Sofia Kvatsabaia	2–6, 2–6
Runner-up	11.	13 February 2012	ITF Portimão, Portugal	Hard	(Netherlands) Lisanne van Riet	(Czech Republic) Nikola Horáková (Czech Republic) Tereza Malíková	3–6, 6–2, [5–10]
Runner-up	12.	12 March 2012	ITF Mumbai, India	Hard	(India) Kyra Shroff	(Thailand) Peangtarn Plipuech (Thailand) Varunya Wongteanchai	1–6, 2–6
Runner-up	13.	19 March 2012	ITF Bangalore, India	Hard	(Slovenia) Tadeja Majerič	(Belgium) Tamaryn Hendler (Austria) Melanie Klaffner	2–6, 6–4, [6–10]
Runner-up	14.	21 May 2012	ITF Velenje, Slovenia	Clay	(Germany) Dejana Raickovic	(Germany) Anna-Lena Friedsam (Hungary) Vanda Lukács	6–7^{(3)}, 7–5, [4–10]
Winner	5.	3 September 2012	ITF Belgrade, Serbia	Clay	(Germany) Christina Shakovets	(Slovakia) Lucia Butkovská (Romania) Camelia Hristea	6–3, 6–3
Runner-up	15.	21 January 2013	ITF Kaarst, Germany	Carpet (i)	(Germany) Jasmin Steinherr	(Switzerland) Viktorija Golubic (Germany) Julia Kimmelmann	3–6, 6–4, [5–10]
Winner	6.	18 February 2013	ITF Sharm el-Sheikh, Egypt	Hard	(Germany) Jasmin Steinherr	(France) Clothilde de Bernardi (France) Chloé Paquet	3–6, 6–2, [10–4]
Runner-up	16.	8 July 2013	ITF Istanbul, Turkey	Hard	(Ukraine) Alona Fomina	(Georgia (country)) Oksana Kalashnikova (Ukraine) Lyudmyla Kichenok	2–6, 6–4, [7–10]
Winner	7.	23 September 2013	Telavi Open, Georgia	Clay	(Italy) Maria Elena Camerin	(Germany) Anna Zaja (Slovenia) Maša Zec Peškirič	7–5, 6–2
