= Anna Zaja =

German tennis player (born 1991)

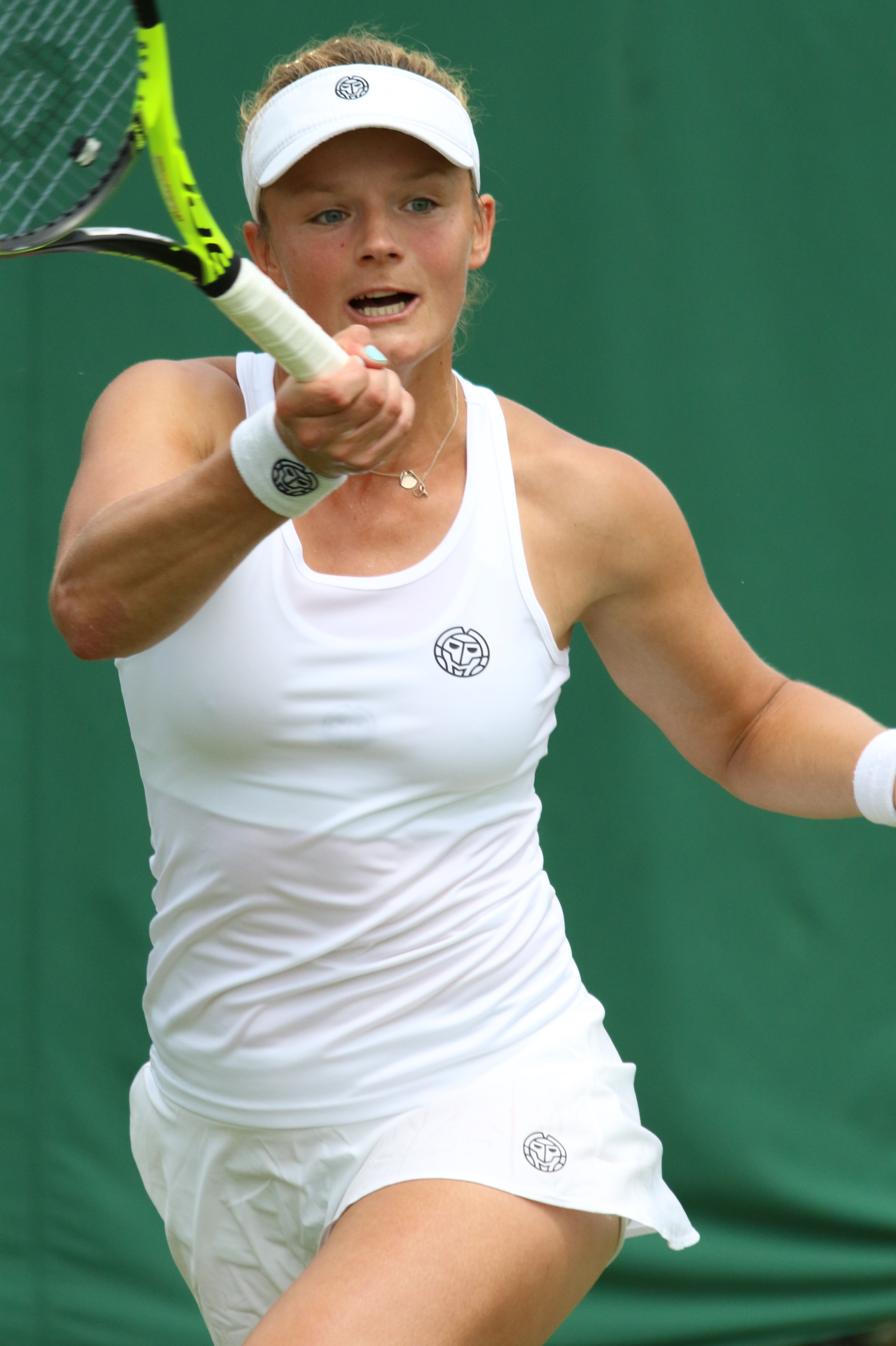
- Zaja at the 2019 Wimbledon qualifying
- Country (sports): Germany
- Born: 25 June 1991 (age 35) Sigmaringen, Germany
- Height: 1.83 m (6 ft 0 in)
- Retired: July 2022
- Plays: Right (two-handed backhand)
- Prize money: $300,489

Singles
- Career record: 332–249
- Career titles: 6 ITF
- Highest ranking: No. 184 (6 May 2019)

Grand Slam singles results
- Australian Open: Q2 (2019)
- French Open: Q1 (2019)
- Wimbledon: Q2 (2019)
- US Open: 1R (2017)

Doubles
- Career record: 164–116
- Career titles: 13 ITF
- Highest ranking: No. 145 (28 April 2014)

Anna Zaja (born 25 June 1991) is a retired German tennis player.

Zaja has won six singles and 13 doubles titles on the ITF Women's Circuit. In May 2019, she reached her best singles ranking of world No. 184. On 28 April 2014, she peaked at No. 145 in the WTA doubles rankings.

== ITF Circuit finals ==
=== Singles: 12 (6 titles, 6 runner-ups) ===
Legend $25,000 tournaments (1–2) $15,000 tournaments (1–0) $10,000 tournaments (4–4)	Finals by surface Hard (4–2) Clay (2–3) Carpet (0–1)

Result	W–L	Date	Tournament	Tier	Surface	Opponent	Score
Loss	0–1	Sep 2010	ITF Mytilene, Greece	10,000	Hard	(Greece) Despina Papamichail	6–3, 3–6, 5–7
Loss	0–2	Jan 2011	ITF Kaarst, Germany	10,000	Carpet (i)	(Germany) Sarah Gronert	7–6^{(4)}, 6–7^{(5)}, 3–6
Win	1–2	Apr 2012	ITF Muscat, Oman	10,000	Hard	(France) Laëtitia Sarrazin	6–2, 6–2
Win	2–2	Mar 2014	ITF Heraklion, Greece	10,000	Hard	(Liechtenstein) Kathinka von Deichmann	6–4, 6–1
Loss	2–3	Jun 2015	ITF Bol, Croatia	10,000	Clay	(Croatia) Iva Mekovec	3–6, 2–6
Win	3–3	Feb 2016	GB Pro-Series Glasgow, UK	10,000	Hard (i)	(United Kingdom) Maia Lumsden	6–4, 6–3
Win	4–3	Mar 2016	ITF Sharm El Sheikh, Egypt	10,000	Hard	(Russia) Anastasiya Komardina	6–4, 7–5
Loss	4–4	Jan 2017	ITF Stuttgart, Germany	15,000	Hard (i)	(Czech Republic) Markéta Vondroušová	6–3, 2–6, 1–6
Win	5–4	Mar 2017	ITF Gonesse, France	15,000	Clay (i)	(France) Priscilla Heise	6–3, 2–6, 7–6^{(6)}
Loss	5–5	Jul 2017	ITF Stuttgart, Germany	25,000	Clay	(United States) Bernarda Pera	4–6, 4–6
Loss	5–6	Jul 2018	ITF Stuttgart, Germany	25,000	Clay	(Luxembourg) Mandy Minella	4–6, 6–4, 1–6
Win	6–6	Jul 2018	ITF Aschaffenburg, Germany	25,000	Clay	(Germany) Katharina Hobgarski	6–4, 7–5

=== Doubles: 27 (13 titles, 14 runner-ups) ===
Legend $50/60,000 tournaments (2–1) $25,000 tournaments (8–6) $10,000 tournaments (3–7)	Finals by surface Hard (3–7) Clay (9–7) Carpet (1–0)

Result	W–L	Date	Tournament	Tier	Surface	Partner	Opponents	Score
Loss	0–1	Oct 2009	ITF Les Franqueses del Vallès, Spain	10,000	Hard	(Israel) Efrat Mishor	(Mexico) Ximena Hermoso (Spain) Garbiñe Muguruza	2–6, 2–6
Loss	0–2	Jul 2010	ITF Horb, Germany	10,000	Clay	(Germany) Korina Perkovic	(Czech Republic) Simona Dobrá (Czech Republic) Lucie Kriegsmannová	6–4, 6–7^{(5)}, [8–10]
Loss	0–3	Jul 2010	ITF Bad Saulgau, Germany	25,000	Clay	(Serbia) Ana Jovanović	(Netherlands) Elise Tamaëla (Germany) Scarlett Werner	4–6, 6–1, 5–7
Loss	0–4	Aug 2010	ITF Doboj, Bosnia and Herzegovina	10,000	Clay	(Romania) Alexandra Damaschin	(Bosnia and Herzegovina) Jasmina Kajtazovič (Slovakia) Zuzana Zlochová	1–6, 2–6
Win	1–4	Jun 2011	ITF Cologne, Germany	10,000	Clay	(Germany) Vanessa Henke	(Germany) Carolin Daniels (Germany) Christina Shakovets	1–6, 6–3, 6–4
Win	2–4	Jul 2011	ITF Darmstadt, Germany	25,000	Clay	(Russia) Natela Dzalamidze	(Czech Republic) Hana Birnerová (Czech Republic) Karolína Plíšková	7–5, 2–6, [10–6]
Loss	2–5	Apr 2012	ITF Manama, Bahrain	10,000	Hard	(Russia) Yana Sizikova	(Australia) Abbie Myers (Russia) Anna Tyulpa	3–6, 6–3, [11–13]
Win	3–5	Apr 2012	ITF Fujairah, United Arab Emirates	10,000	Hard	(Russia) Yana Sizikova	(Oman) Fatma Al-Nabhani (India) Kyra Shroff	6–4, 6–1
Loss	3–6	May 2012	ITF Istanbul, Turkey	10,000	Hard	(Oman) Fatma Al-Nabhani	(Turkey) Başak Eraydın (Turkey) Melis Sezer	2–6, 6–3, [7–10]
Win	4–6	Sep 2012	Royal Cup, Montenegro	50,000	Clay	(Italy) Nicole Clerico	(Argentina) Mailen Auroux (Argentina) María Irigoyen	4–6, 6–3, [11–9]
Loss	4–7	Oct 2012	GB Pro-Series Glasgow, UK	25,000	Hard (i)	(Italy) Nicole Clerico	(Poland) Justyna Jegiołka (Latvia) Diāna Marcinkēviča	2–6, 1–6
Loss	4–8	Apr 2013	Wiesbaden Open, Germany	25,000	Clay	(Germany) Dinah Pfizenmaier	(Canada) Gabriela Dabrowski (Canada) Sharon Fichman	3–6, 3–6
Win	5–8	May 2013	ITF Casablanca, Morocco	25,000	Clay	(Germany) Justine Ozga	(Bulgaria) Elitsa Kostova (Poland) Sandra Zaniewska	6–4, 6–2
Loss	5–9	Sep 2013	Telavi Open, Georgia	50,000	Clay	(Slovenia) Maša Zec Peškirič	(Italy) Maria Elena Camerin (Slovenia) Anja Prislan	5–7, 2–6
Loss	5–10	Mar 2014	ITF Irapuato, Mexico	25,000	Hard	(Russia) Irina Khromacheva	(United States) Denise Muresan (Netherlands) Indy de Vroome	4–6, 7–5, [7–10]
Win	6–10	Oct 2015	Ismaning Open, Germany	10,000	Carpet (i)	(Germany) Lena Rüffer	(Belgium) Michaela Boev (Germany) Hristina Dishkova	5–7, 7–6^{(3)}, [10–3]
Loss	6–11	Jan 2016	ITF Stuttgart, Germany	10,000	Hard (i)	(Germany) Laura Schaeder	(Russia) Anna Blinkova (Russia) Maria Marfutina	6–0, 4–6, [8–10]
Loss	6–12	Feb 2016	GB Pro-Series Glasgow, UK	10,000	Hard (i)	(Oman) Fatma Al-Nabhani	(Switzerland) Nina Stadler (Belgium) Kimberley Zimmermann	2–6, 6–7^{(7)}
Win	7–12	Jul 2016	ITF Aschaffenburg, Germany	25,000	Clay	(Germany) Nicola Geuer	(Slovenia) Dalila Jakupović (China) Lu Jiajing	6–4, 6–4
Loss	7–13	Aug 2016	ITF Bad Saulgau, Germany	25,000	Clay	(Germany) Nicola Geuer	(Romania) Irina Bara (Ukraine) Oleksandra Korashvili	5–7, 6–4, [4–10]
Win	8–13	Aug 2016	Ladies Open Hechingen, Germany	25,000	Clay	(Germany) Nicola Geuer	(Germany) Vivian Heisen (Austria) Pia König	6–3, 6–1
Win	9–13	Jan 2017	Open Andrézieux-Bouthéon, France	60,000	Hard (i)	(Germany) Nicola Geuer	(Romania) Ana Bogdan (Romania) Ioana Loredana Roșca	6–3, 2–2 ret.
Win	10–13	Apr 2017	ITF Jackson, United States	25,000	Clay	(Russia) Alla Kudryavtseva	(Chile) Alexa Guarachi (United States) Ronit Yurovsky	6–2, 6–0
Win	11–13	Jun 2017	ITF Baja, Hungary	25,000	Clay	(Slovakia) Chantal Škamlová	(Hungary) Ágnes Bukta (Slovakia) Vivien Juhászová	6–7^{(5)}, 6–1, [11–9]
Loss	11–14	Jul 2017	ITF Stuttgart, Germany	25,000	Clay	(Germany) Laura Schaeder	(Russia) Kseniia Bekker (Romania) Raluca Șerban	3–6, 7–5, [5–10]
Win	12–14	Apr 2018	ITF Pula, Italy	25,000	Clay	(Russia) Valeriya Solovyeva	(France) Manon Arcangioli (Slovakia) Chantal Škamlová	7–5, 6–3
Win	13–14	Feb 2019	GB Pro-Series Glasgow, UK	25,000	Hard (i)	(Netherlands) Lesley Kerkhove	(United Kingdom) Freya Christie (Croatia) Jana Fett	6–4, 3–6, [10–3]
