= Telavi =

Telavi თელავი
- City
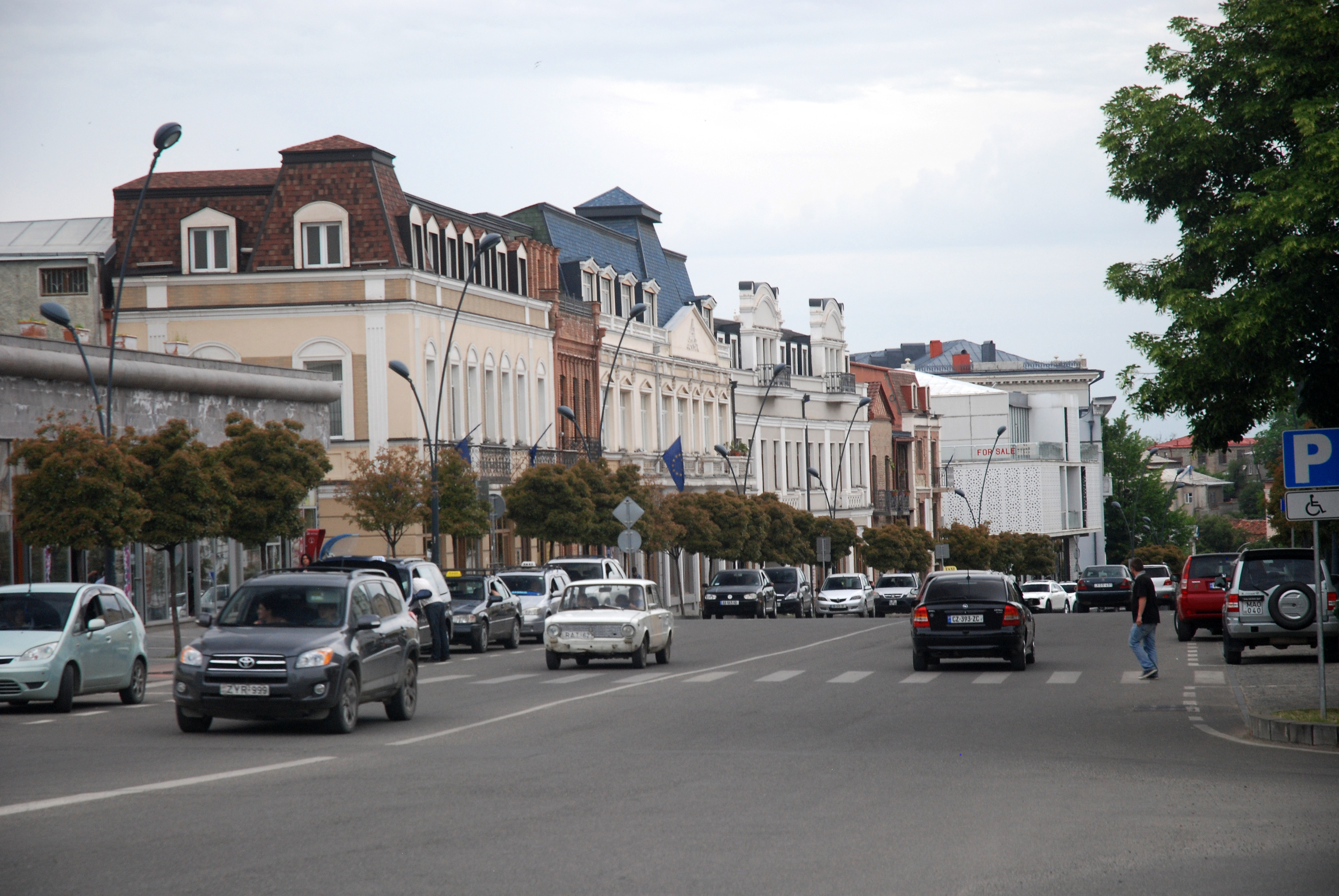
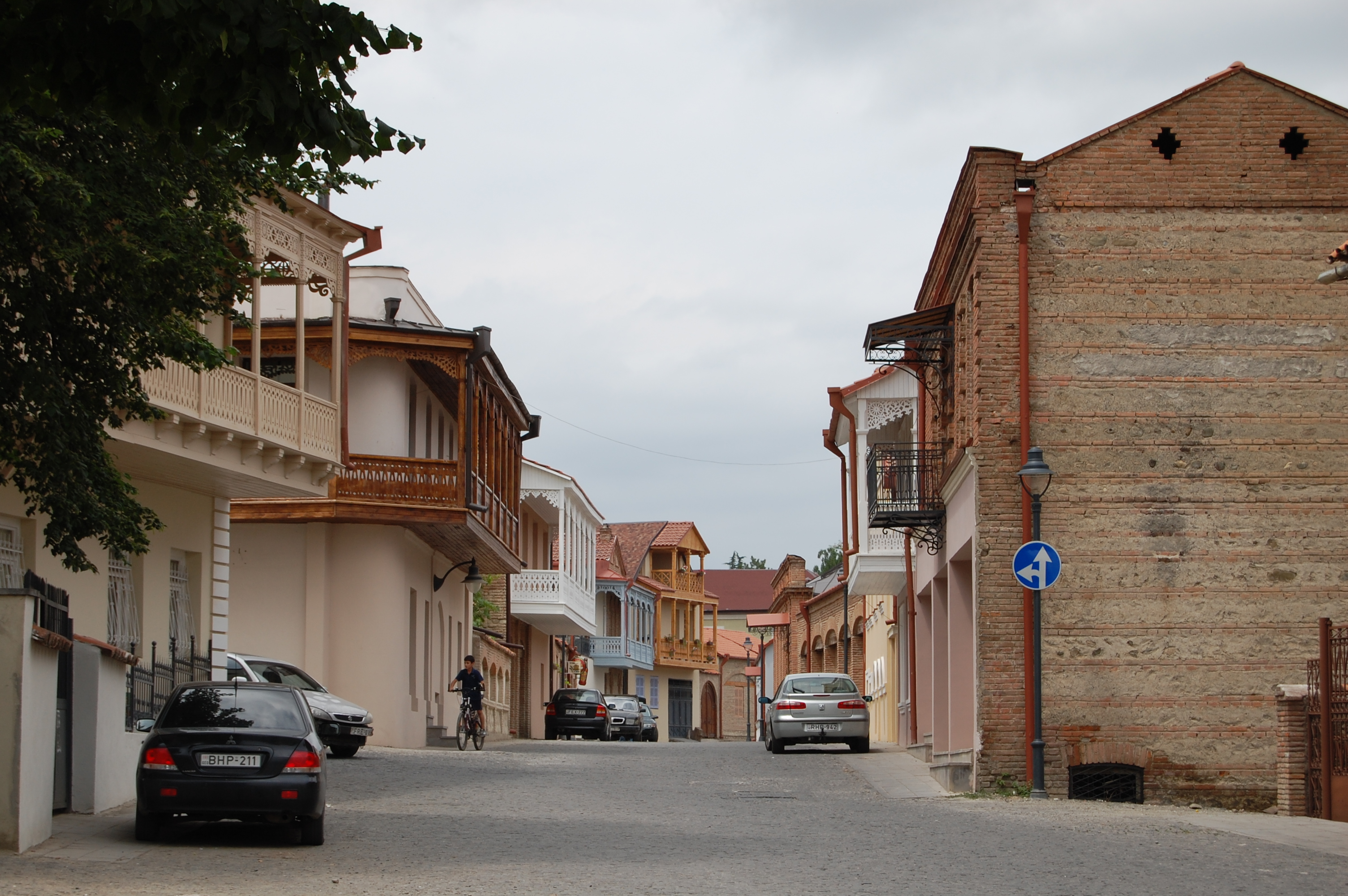
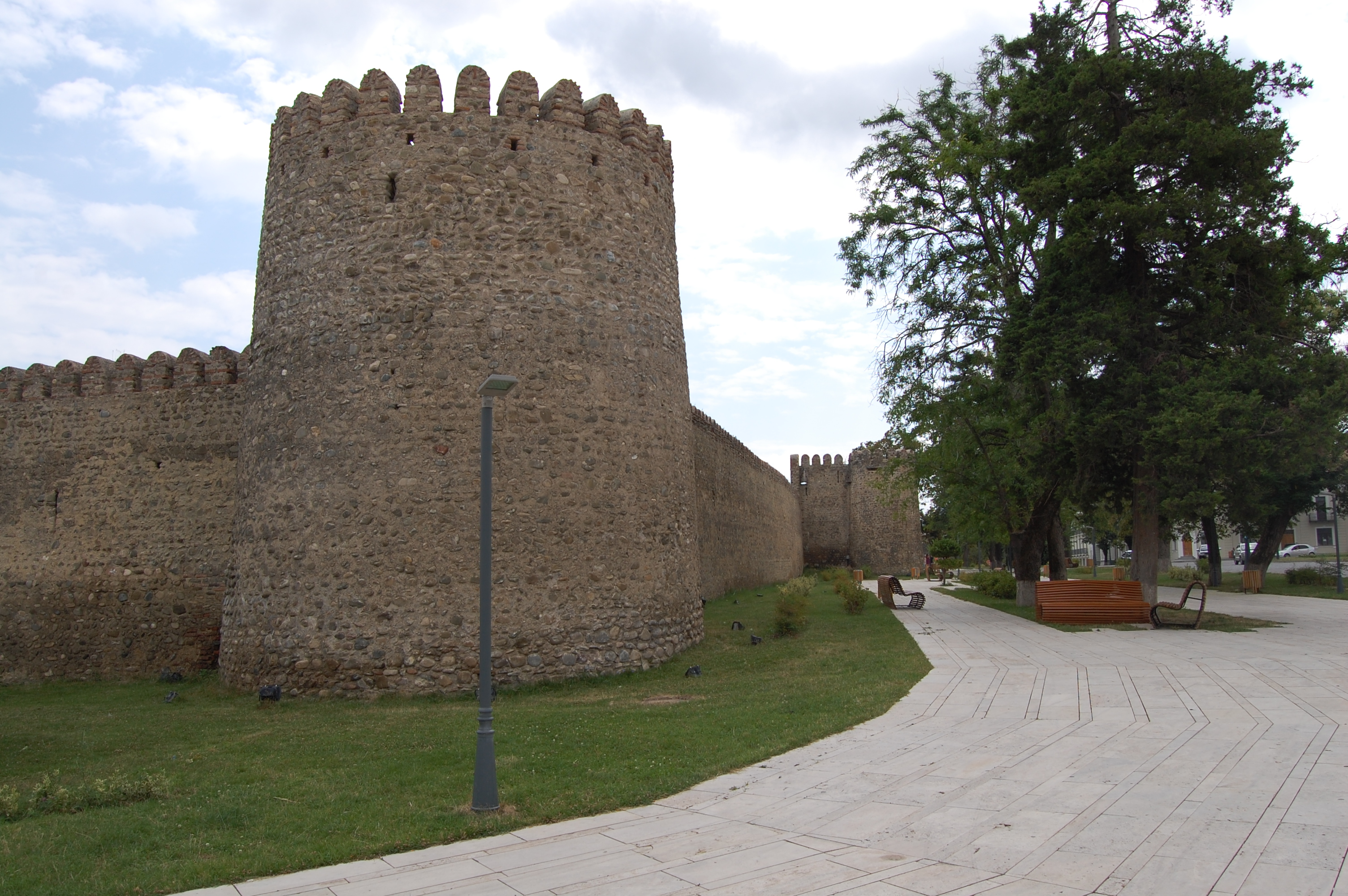

- Flag Coat of arms

- Location within Georgia Location within Kakheti
- Coordinates: 41°55′0″N 45°29′0″E
- Country: Georgia
- Mkhare: Kakheti
- Municipality: Telavi Municipality
- Elevation: 490 m (1,610 ft)

Population (2024)
  - Total: 16,800
- Time zone: UTC+4 (Georgian Time)
- Area code: (+995) 350
- Website: telavi.gov.ge/en

Telavi (/təˈlɑːvi/; თელავი [t̪ʰeɫaβi]) is the main city and administrative center of the eastern Georgian province of Kakheti. As of the 2024 census, its population was 16,800. The city is located on the foothills of the Tsiv-Gombori Range at 500–800 m (1,600–2,600 ft) above sea level.

== History ==
The first archaeological findings from Telavi date back to the Bronze Age. One of the earliest surviving accounts of Telavi is from the 2nd century AD, by Greek geographer Claudius Ptolemaeus, who mentions the name Teleda (a reference to Telavi). Telavi began to transform into a fairly important and large political and administrative center in the 8th century. Interesting information on Telavi is provided in the records by an Arab geographer, Al-Muqaddasi of the 10th century, who mentions Telavi along with such important cities of that time's Caucasus as Tbilisi, Shamkhor, Ganja, Shemakha and Shirvan. Speaking about the population of Telavi, Al-Muqaddasi points out that for the most part it consisted of Christians.

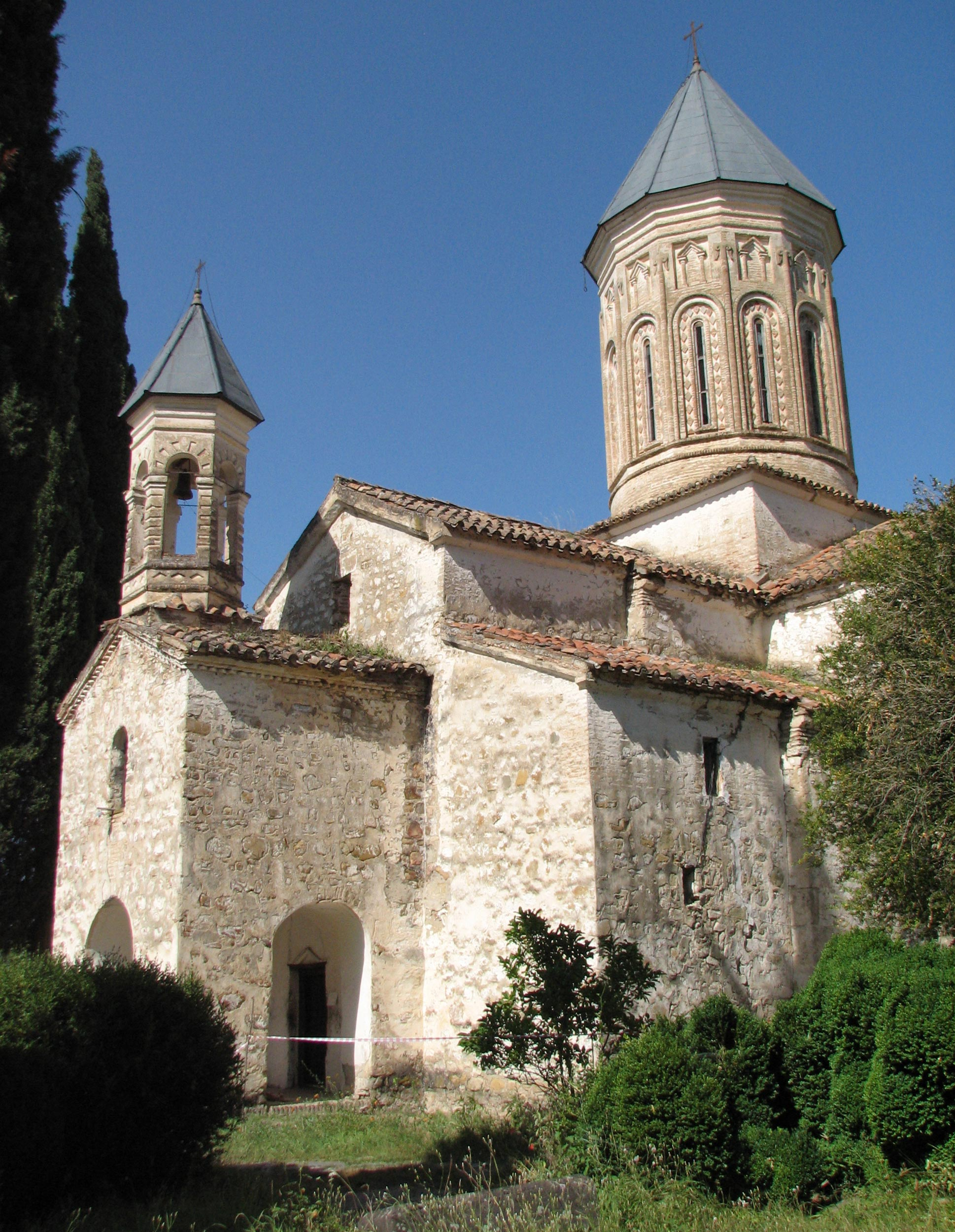
Ikalto (c. 800)

From the 10th to the 12th centuries, Telavi served as the capital of the Kingdom of Kakheti and later Kingdom of Kakheti-Hereti. During the Golden Era of the Georgian State (12th–13th centuries), Telavi turned into one of the most important political and economic centers of the Georgian State. After the disintegration of the united Georgian Kingdom in the 15th century, the role of Telavi started to decline and the city eventually became an ordinary town of trade and crafts. Telavi regained its political importance in the 17th century when it became a capital of the kingdom of Kakheti. By 1762, it turned into the second capital (after Tbilisi) of the united Eastern Georgian Kingdom of Kartl-Kakheti. The reign of King Erekle II, who was born and died in this city, was a special epoch in the history of Telavi. During this period from 1744 to 1798, it grew into a strategic and cultural centre. Erakle II established there a theological seminary and founded a theatre. Erekle II's reforms touched upon all aspects of life in the country. They changed fundamentally the political, economical and cultural orientation of Kartli-Kakheti and, subsequently of the whole Georgia. His name became a symbol of freedom and national independence of the Georgian people. Erakle II is still called affectionately "Patara Kakhi" ('Little Kakhetian'), and his heroic deeds are described in folk literature.

=== Russian rule ===
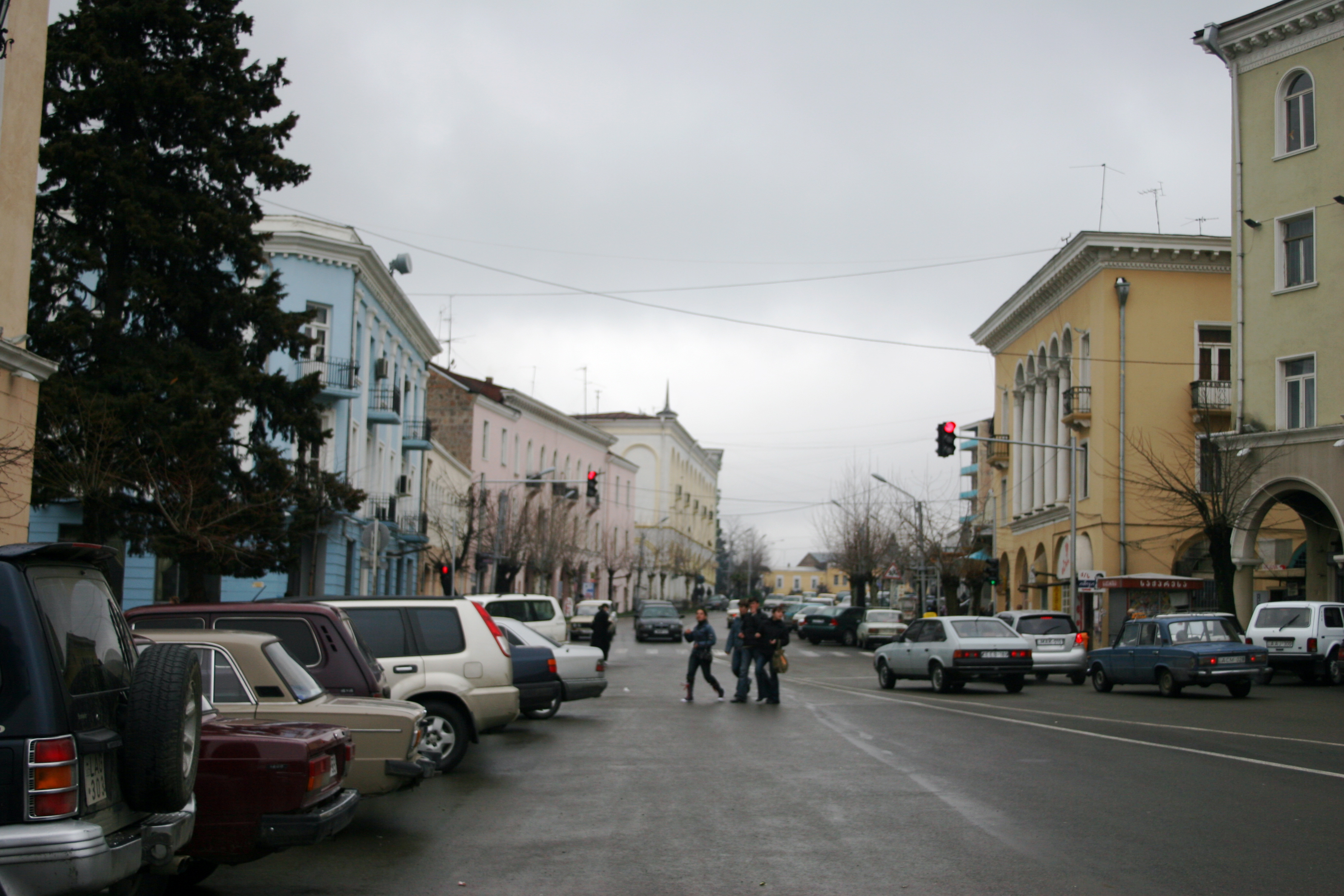
Streets of Telavi city

In 1801, after the Kingdom of Kartli-Kakheti was annexed by the Russian Empire, Telavi lost its status as a capital. In the 19th century, the city was the administrative center of the Telavi uezd within the Tiflis Governorate. During that period, the economy of the city was mainly composed of small-scale industries (leather painting, pottery production, wine-making, etc.), commerce and agriculture. The town's population was about 12,000 in the end of the 19th century (including about 9,000 Armenians and 2,000 ethnic Georgians).

== Heritage ==
Telavi and its surroundings are rich in historical, architectural and natural monuments. The most important heritage monuments preserved within the city limits include:

- Dzveli Galavani ('Old Walls') – fortress of the first Kakhetian kings (9th–10th centuries)
- Church of the St. Mary (16th century)
- Church of the Holy Trinity (6th century)
- Fortress Batonis Tsikhe ('Fortress of Master') built in the 17th century; one of the only well-preserved medieval royal palaces in Georgia
- Korchibashishvilebis Tsikhe – castle of the local noblemen named Korchibashishvilis (16th–18th century)
- Akhvakhishvilebis Tsikhe – castle of the local noblemen named Vakhvakhishvilis (18th century)

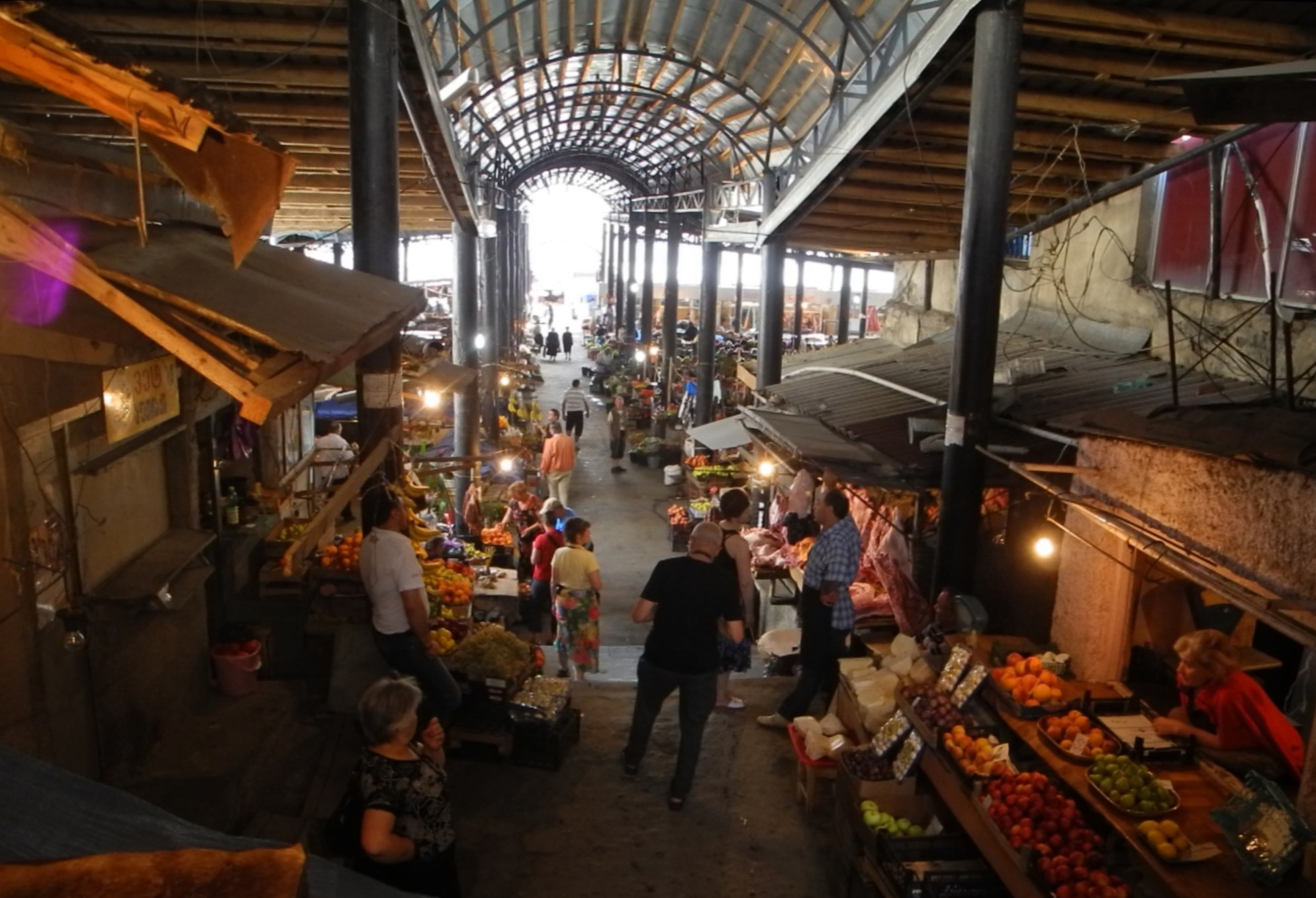
Open market of Telavi city

Telavi is the only city in Georgia where four fortification monuments from four historical periods remain relatively intact. Due to this reason, architects, scholars and art historians consider Telavi as the most "medieval" city in the country. Another curious sight in Telavi is a 900-year-old plane tree which is 40 m (130 ft) high and 11 m (36 ft) around the trunk. Other notable landmarks around Telavi include the Alaverdi Cathedral (11th century), the second highest cathedral in Georgia after the newly built Tbilisi Sameba Cathedral; the Ikalto Academy (8th-12th centuries–), where the famous Georgian writer Shota Rustaveli studied; the Church of St. George (dedicated to the patron saint of Georgia, where it is said that there are 365 churches named St. George); ruins of the city and castle of Gremi (the former capital of Kakheti during the 15th–17th centuries); Shuamta, a complex made of three churches of different periods—6th, 7th and 8th centuries—in a highland forest; Akhali Shuamta ('New Shuamta'), the monastery close to Dzveli Shuamta ('Old Shuamta'), built in the 16th century; the stunning Tsinandali Gardens (the residential Palace of Noblemen Chavchavadzes family); and many others.

=== Armenian heritage of Telavi ===
The former Armenian population had a rich cultural life, some of which remains to this day, and some of which is lost.

- Avag (Mother) St. George Church – called Surb Gevorg in Armenian, located in the heart of the old city. The bell tower was built in 1829. In 1861 permission was requested to build a dome (gmbet) on the church. By early 1923 the church was closed, and the bell tower was demolished on April 19, 1924. In May of the same year the gavit was also demolished, along with the serf walls on the western and southern sides.
- Surb Karapet Church – built in 1797. By 1818 it was already not used anymore.
- Dzvelgalavani Surb Gevorg Church – date of construction is unknown, but there are records that it was already built between 1798 and 1800, and that it was renovated in 1852 at a cost of 1,500 manet. Still stands. In poor condition.
- Surb Astvatsatsin ('Holy Mother of God'). Located in the old Armenian cemetery. There are records of it already existing by 1840, which means it was built at some point prior. In 1879, 4000 rubles were spent to build a dome (gmbet) on the church. On the night of December 10, 1894, the church was robbed, leading to protective walls being built around it. Still stands, and functions as a Georgian Church now.
- Surb Yerordutyun Church. There are no known records about the construction, but there are records of it beginning in the 1800s. It was closed in 1923.
- Surb Tovmas Chapel. Built of wood from 1882 to 1885 at a cost of 280 rubles. Closed in 1923. Still stands.

== Geography ==
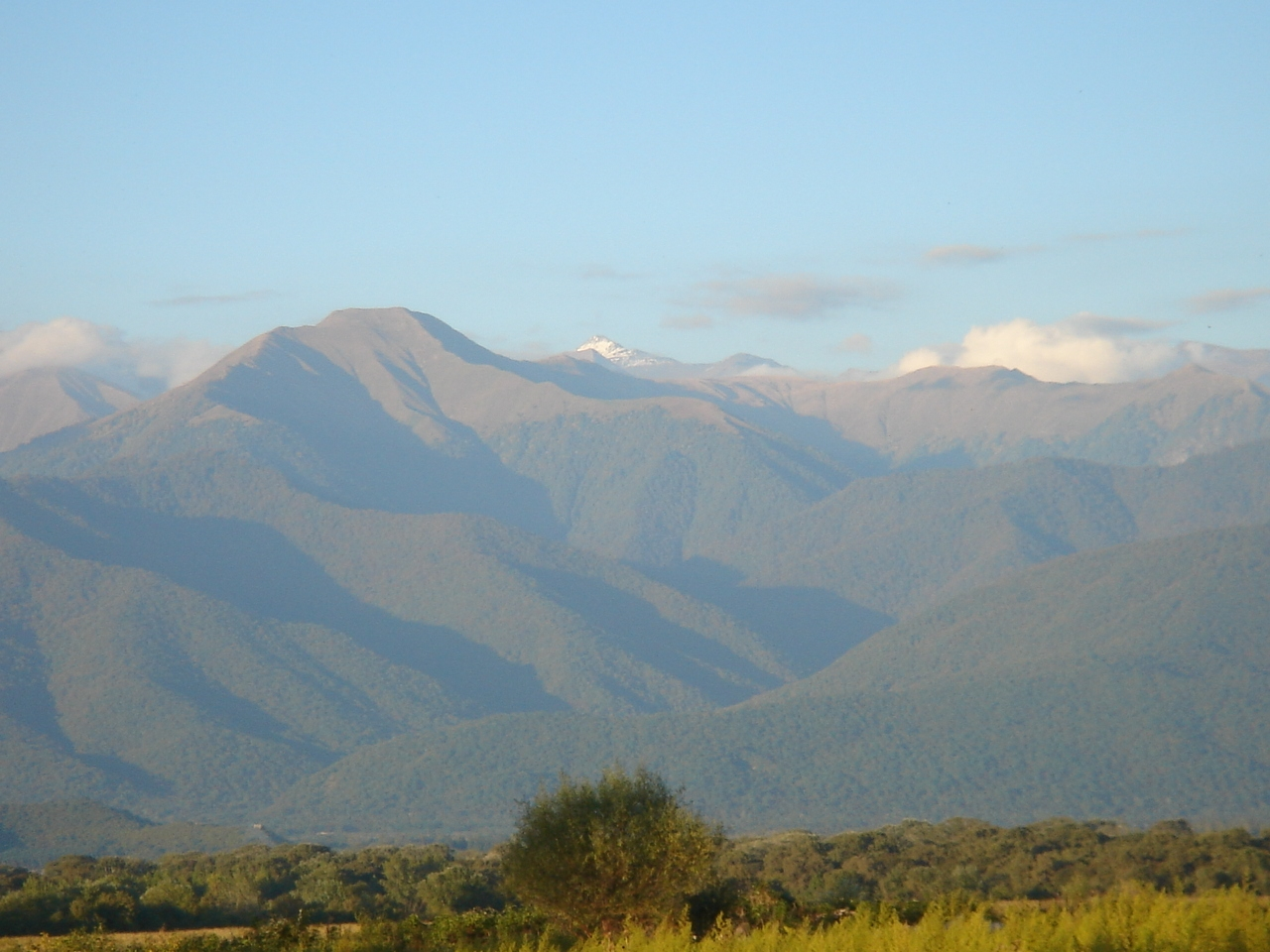
The Alazani River Plain

Telavi faces the Tsiv-Gombori Range to the south and southwest and borders on the Alazani Valley to the north and east.

The Greater Caucasus Mountain Range, which runs to the north of the Alazani Valley, can be seen from most of Telavi.

At present, the city of Telavi is connected with Tbilisi by two highways. The most widely traveled (and better-paved) highway runs through the rural areas of Kakheti and is longer (the overall length of the highway is approximately 156 km (97 mi)) than the route, which runs through the highlands of the Gombori Mountain Range.

The shorter route (approximately 96 km (60 mi)) is quite scenic, but is less used due to the reconstruction works that are being carried out there from 2014, but now it is used way. The road is a little difficult for non-professional and non-experienced drivers, as it is very narrow and dangerous.

Because of its beauty, historical monuments and hospitality and the reputation for kindness of its residents, the city is a popular tourist destination in Georgia.

=== Climate ===
Highest recorded temperature: 41.6 °C (106.9 °F) on 31 July 2000.

Lowest recorded temperature: −15.0 °C (5.0 °F) on 28 January 2016.

Climate data for Telavi (1991–2020, extremes 1981-2020)
Month	Jan	Feb	Mar	Apr	May	Jun	Jul	Aug	Sep	Oct	Nov	Dec	Year
Record high °C (°F)	18.8 (65.8)	20.4 (68.7)	26.1 (79.0)	32.3 (90.1)	32.1 (89.8)	35.8 (96.4)	40.2 (104.4)	41.6 (106.9)	36.0 (96.8)	32.7 (90.9)	24.6 (76.3)	21.3 (70.3)	41.6 (106.9)
Mean daily maximum °C (°F)	6.3 (43.3)	7.9 (46.2)	12.6 (54.7)	17.8 (64.0)	22.7 (72.9)	27.3 (81.1)	30.2 (86.4)	30.4 (86.7)	25.4 (77.7)	19.2 (66.6)	12.3 (54.1)	8.0 (46.4)	18.3 (65.0)
Mean daily minimum °C (°F)	−1.7 (28.9)	−0.9 (30.4)	2.9 (37.2)	7.4 (45.3)	12.1 (53.8)	16.1 (61.0)	18.9 (66.0)	18.8 (65.8)	14.7 (58.5)	9.8 (49.6)	3.7 (38.7)	−0.1 (31.8)	8.5 (47.3)
Record low °C (°F)	−15.0 (5.0)	−14.6 (5.7)	−10.5 (13.1)	−4.7 (23.5)	3.1 (37.6)	8.4 (47.1)	9.9 (49.8)	9.0 (48.2)	4.5 (40.1)	−1.6 (29.1)	−6.8 (19.8)	−13.7 (7.3)	−15.0 (5.0)
Average precipitation mm (inches)	28.0 (1.10)	28.0 (1.10)	51.5 (2.03)	90.3 (3.56)	119.1 (4.69)	96.2 (3.79)	67.1 (2.64)	66.7 (2.63)	69.5 (2.74)	61.6 (2.43)	46.5 (1.83)	29.4 (1.16)	753.9 (29.7)
Average precipitation days (≥ 1.0 mm)	5	5.1	7.5	9.8	12.1	9.1	6.8	6.3	6.8	6.9	5.5	4.8	85.7
Source: NCEI

== Politics ==
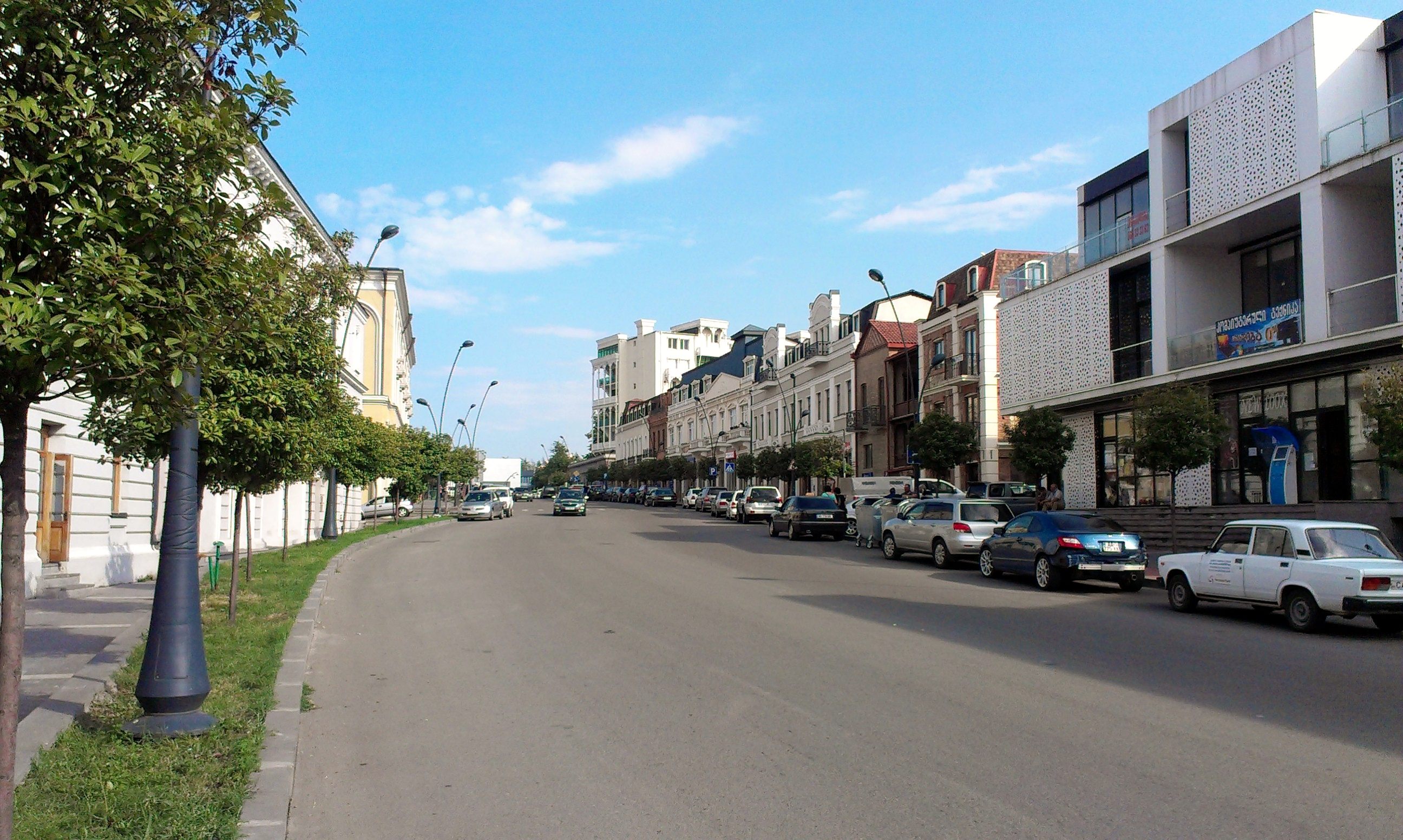
Ilia Chavchavadze Street

Telavi Municipal Assembly (Georgian: თელავის საკრებულო) is a representative body in Telavi. currently consisting of 33 members. The council is assembles into session regularly, to consider subject matters such as code changes, utilities, taxes, city budget, oversight of city government and more. Telavi sakrebulo is elected every four year. The last election was held in October 2017.

Party	Seats	Current Municipal Assembly
Georgian Dream	24	
UNM	5	
European Georgia	2	
For Georgia	1	
Alliance of Patriots	1	

== Notable Residents ==
- King Erekle II (1720-1798), King of Kartli and Kakheti
- King George XII (1746-1800), Last Georgian Monarch
- Prince Iulon (1760-1816), Georgian prince, half-brother of King George XII
- Elene Akhvlediani (1898-1976), Georgian painter
- Girgor Harutyunyan (1900-1957), First Secretary of the Communist Party of the Armenian SSR
- Henrik Malyan (1925-1988), Armenian film director
- Givi Chikvanaia (1939-2018), Georgian waterpolo player
- Kakhi Asatiani (1947-2002), Georgian football player
- Larissa Petrosyan (1993-), model
- Givi Chokheli (1937-1994), Georgian football player
- Alim Nabiev (1994-), Azerbaijani kickboxer

== In popular culture ==
Telavi serves as the hometown of the Georgian bush pilot Mimino (Vakhtang Kikabidze) in the 1977 Soviet comedy Mimino.

== Twin towns – sister cities ==
- Ushiku, Japan (2026)
- Arkadag, Turkmenistan (2023)
- Biberach an der Riß, Germany
- Kėdainiai, Lithuania
- Napa, California, United States
- Santa Coloma de Gramenet, Catalonia, Spain

== See also ==
- Kakheti
- Tsinandali
