= Margarita Lazareva =

Russian tennis player (born 1990)

Margarita Lazareva Маргарита Лазарева
- Full name: Margarita Valerievna Lazareva
- Country (sports): Russia
- Born: October 10, 1990 (age 36) Zhukovsky, Russia
- Plays: Left (two-handed backhand)
- Prize money: US$ 125,017

Singles
- Career record: 303–324
- Career titles: 7 ITF
- Highest ranking: No. 336 (24 November 2014)

Doubles
- Career record: 308–258
- Career titles: 26 ITF
- Highest ranking: No. 254 (6 June 2016)

Margarita Valerievna Lazareva (Russian: Маргарита Валерьевна Лазарева; born October 10, 1990) is a retired Russian tennis player.

== Early life ==
Margarita Lazareva was born in Zhukovsky, Russia where she started playing tennis when she was seven years old. She is predominantly left-handed, her preferred surface is hardcourt.

== Career ==
Her end of the year singles ranking in 2021 was 1165, in 2020 it was 922, in 2019 it was 853 and in 2018 it was 988. Margarita has won seven titles. In 2016, she won two titles, both in Djibouti on hardcourt. In 2015, she won one title ($10k in El Kantaoui), in 2014 and in 2013 she won also one title, and in 2012 two titles (all $10ks in Gaziantep and Trabzon).

In June 2012, she defeated Melis Sezer in the Trabzon final in Turkey. She won the first singles title of her career. She became the champion in doubles with her Australian partner Abbie Myers. In September 2012, she defeated Uzbek Nigina Abduraimova in the final in Gaziantep, Turkey. In October 2012, she played in the final of the Lagos Open in Nigeria, with her doubles partner, Russian Nina Bratchikova. In the final, they were defeated by Swiss Conny Perrin and South African Chanel Simmonds.

In December 2015, she played with her doubles partner Valeriya Strakhova in another final of the Lagos Open in which they defeated Valeria Bhunu from Zimbabwe and Ester Masuri from Israel.

In January 2016, she and Valeriya Strakhova defeated Melis Sezer and Ekaterina Yashina in the final of Aurangabad, India. In October 2016, she played the singles final in Stellenbosch, South Africa where she beat African Chanel Simmonds. In December 2016, she reached the singles and doubles finals in Djibouti, and defeated India's Riya Bhatia in singles. In doubles, she reached two finals in two weeks with her partners Kelia Le Bihan and Riya Bhatia.

In 2019, Volkl Tennis made a post saying “Margarita Lazareva is one of our Russian WTA/ITF World Tennis Tour players. Her current ITF singles ranking is 316. She has been competing on tour since 2008 and has six ITF singles titles to go along with more than 20 doubles titles. Margarita’s weapon of choice is the V-Feel 8 300g and she uses Cyclone Tour 1.25mm string”.

Lazareva competed on the WTA Tour but her most recent win was in March 2021 in the first round in Manacor, Spain against Paula Cabrer, on the ITF World Tennis Tour.
