= Tímea Babos career statistics =

List of the career statistics of tennis player Tímea Babos

Career finals
Discipline	Type	Won	Lost	Total
Singles	Grand Slam	–	–	0
Singles	WTA Finals	–	–	0
Singles	WTA Elite (Note: Formerly known as WTA Tournament of Champions until 2015.)	–	–	0
Singles	WTA 1000	–	–	0
Singles	WTA 500	–	–	0
Singles	WTA 250	3	5	8
Singles	Olympics	–	–	0
Singles	Total	3	5	8
Doubles	Grand Slam	4	4	8
Doubles	WTA Finals	3	1	4
Doubles	WTA Elite	–	–	0
Doubles	WTA 1000	2	5	7
Doubles	WTA 500	7	2	9
Doubles	WTA 250	13	3	16
Doubles	Olympics	–	–	0
Doubles	Total	29	15	44
Mixed	Grand Slam	–	2	2
Mixed	Total	0	2	2

This is a list of the main career statistics of Hungarian professional tennis player Tímea Babos. Babos has won three titles in singles and 28 in doubles. For her results, she is widely regarded as one of the most successful players in doubles events for the last years. Among her biggest achievements as a doubles player, there are four majors; she won at the Australian Open in 2018 and 2020 and at the French Open in 2019 and 2020. She also won three WTA Finals, as well as two WTA Premier 5 trophies. In addition, she has more significant results in doubles such as finishing as a runner-up at Wimbledon in 2014 and 2016, the US Open in 2018 and Australian Open in 2019. Babos gained world No. 1 in doubles on 16 July 2018, while in singles, she has peaked at No. 25 in September 2016.

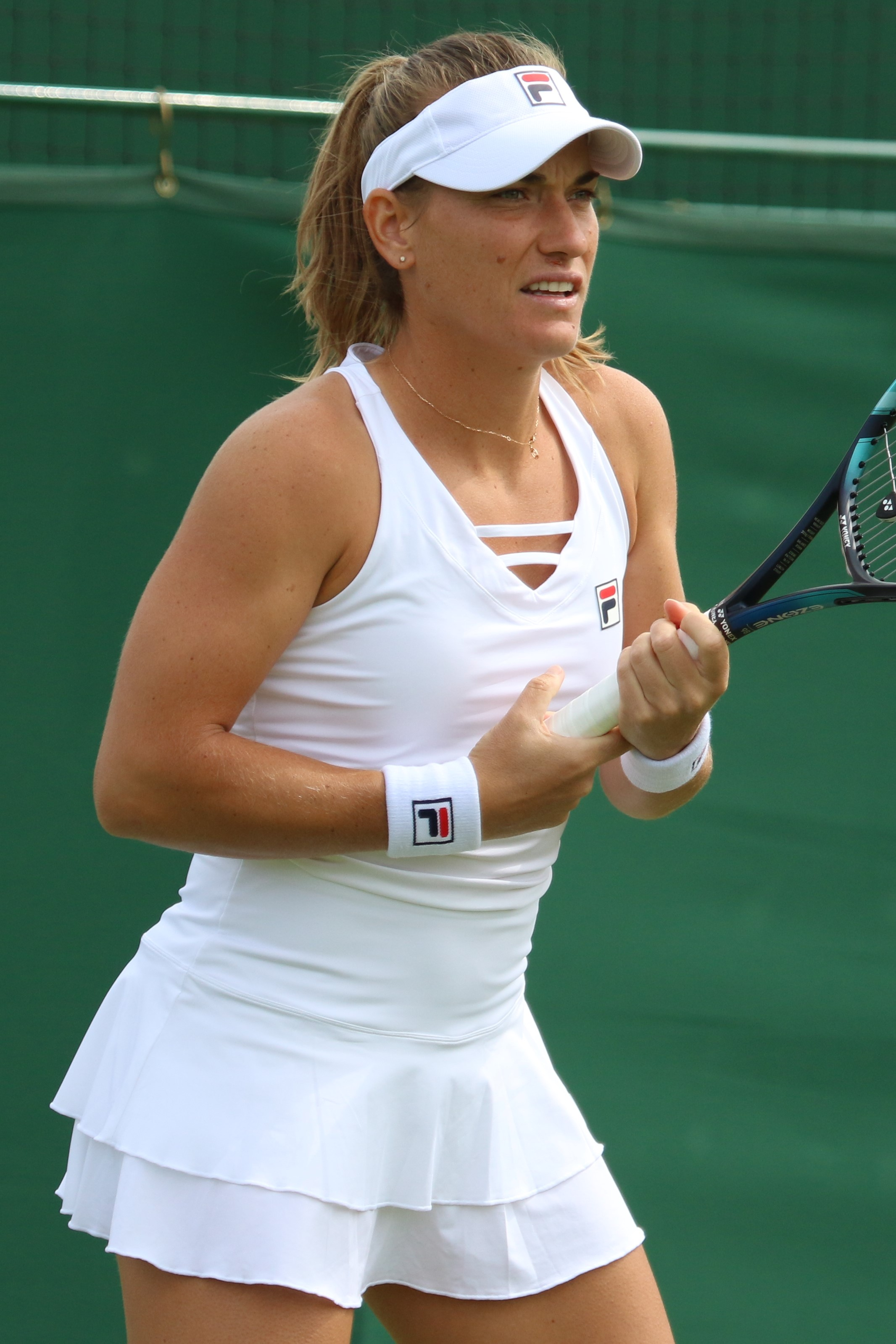
Babos at the 2023 Wimbledon Championships.

== Performance timelines ==
Key
W	F	SF	QF	#R	RR	Q#	P#	DNQ	A	Z#	PO	G	S	B	NMS	NTI	P	NH

(W) winner; (F) finalist; (SF) semifinalist; (QF) quarterfinalist; (#R) rounds 4, 3, 2, 1; (RR) round-robin stage; (Q#) qualification round; (P#) preliminary round; (DNQ) did not qualify; (A) absent; (Z#) Davis/Fed Cup Zonal Group (with number indication) or (PO) play-off; (G) gold, (S) silver or (B) bronze Olympic/Paralympic medal; (NMS) not a Masters tournament; (NTI) not a Tier I tournament; (P) postponed; (NH) not held; (SR) strike rate (events won / competed); (W–L) win–loss record.
To avoid confusion and double counting, these charts are updated at the conclusion of a tournament or when the player's participation has ended.

Only main-draw results in WTA Tour, Grand Slam tournaments, Billie Jean King Cup, United Cup, Hopman Cup and Olympic Games are included in win–loss records.

=== Singles ===
Current through the 2025 US Open – Women's doubles .

Tournament	2010	2011	2012	2013	2014	2015	2016	2017	2018	2019	2020	2021	2022	2023	2024	2025	SR	W–L	Win %
Grand Slam tournaments
Australian Open	A	A	Q2	1R	1R	1R	2R	1R	2R	2R	1R	2R	A	A	Q1	A	0 / 9	4–9	31%
French Open	A	A	1R	Q2	Q3	1R	2R	1R	1R	1R	1R	Q2	A	A	Q2	A	0 / 7	1–7	13%
Wimbledon	A	A	2R	1R	1R	2R	2R	1R	1R	Q1	NH	1R	Q3	Q1	A	A	0 / 8	3–8	27%
US Open	A	Q1	1R	1R	1R	1R	3R	2R	1R	2R	1R	A	A	Q2	A	A	0 / 9	4–9	31%
Win–Loss	0–0	0–0	1–3	0–3	0–3	1–4	5–4	1–4	1–4	2–3	0–3	1–2	0–0	0–0	0–0	0–0	0 / 33	12–33	27%
Year-end championships
WTA Elite Trophy	DNQ						RR	DNQ			NH			DNQ			0 / 1	0–2	0%
National representation
Summer Olympics	NH		2R	NH			1R	NH				A	NH		A	NH	0 / 2	1–2	33%
Billie Jean King Cup (Note: Formerly known as Fed Cup until 2020.)	A	Z1	Z1	Z1	Z1	Z1	A	Z1	A	A	A (Note: Edition is split into the two years due to COVID-19.)		A	A	A	Z1	0 / 0	11–6	65%
WTA 1000 + former^{†} tournaments
Qatar Open	NH	NTI	A	2R	A	NTI	3R	NTI	1R	NTI	1R	NTI	A	NTI	Q2	A	0 / 4	4–4	30%
Dubai Championships	A	A	Not Tier I			1R	NTI	A	NTI	1R	NTI	1R	NTI	A	Q2	A	0 / 3	0–3	30%
Indian Wells Open	A	A	A	1R	Q1	Q2	1R	3R	1R	1R	NH	A	A	A	A	A	0 / 5	1–5	17%
Miami Open	A	A	A	A	Q1	1R	4R	2R	2R	Q2	NH	Q2	A	A	A	A	0 / 4	4–4	50%
Madrid Open	A	A	A	A	A	A	1R	1R	1R	A	NH	A	A	A	A	A	0 / 3	0–3	0%
Italian Open	A	A	A	A	A	Q1	3R	1R	2R	A	Q2	A	A	A	A	A	0 / 4	3–3	50%
Canadian Open	A	A	1R	A	A	Q1	1R	2R	1R	Q2	NH	A	A	A	Q1	A	0 / 4	1–4	20%
Cincinnati Open	A	A	2R	A	Q2	2R	QF	1R	1R	A	A	A	A	A	A	A	0 / 5	5–5	50%
China Open	A	A	Q1	A	A	Q1	2R	A	2R	Q1	Not Held			A	A	A	0 / 2	2–2	50%
Wuhan Open	Not Held				A	1R	1R	A	1R	A	Not Held				A	A	0 / 3	0–3	0%
Pan Pacific Open^{†}	A	A	Q1	A	Not Tier I						Not Held		Not Tier I				0 / 0	0–0	0%
Win–loss	0–0	0–0	1–2	1–2	0–0	1–4	11–9	2–6	3–9	0–2	0–1	0–1	0–0	0–0	0–0	0–0	0 / 36	19–36	35%
Career statistics
	2010	2011	2012	2013	2014	2015	2016	2017	2018	2019	2020	2021	2022	2023	2024	2025	SR	W–L	Win %
Tournaments	1	1	16	16	11	21	27	27	25	16	6	9	1	3	16	0	Career total: 196		
Titles	0	0	1	0	0	0	0	1	1	0	0	0	0	0	0	0	Career total: 3		
Finals	0	0	1	0	0	1	1	3	2	0	0	0	0	0	0	0	Career total: 8		
Overall win–loss	0–1	2–3	16–16	12–17	6–12	13–22	35–28	22–26	19–24	6–16	0–6	3–9	0–1	1–3	1–4	0-0	3 / 196	136–188	42%
Win %	0%	40%	50%	41%	33%	37%	56%	46%	44%	27%	0%	25%	0%	25%	0%	0%	Career total: 42%		
Year-end ranking (Note: 2009: WTA ranking–700.)	329	153	64	88	99	85	26	57	61	104	115	161	319	177	333		$8,939,062		

=== Doubles ===
Current through the 2023 Italian Open.

Tournament	2011	2012	2013	2014	2015	2016	2017	2018	2019	2020	2021	2022	2023	2024	2025	SR	W–L	Win%
Grand Slam tournaments
Australian Open	A	A	1R	3R	2R	2R	3R	W	F	W	A	A	2R	2R	3R	2 / 11	27–9	75%
French Open	A	2R	1R	1R	2R	3R	2R	QF	W	W	1R	A	2R	1R	3R	2 / 13	23–11	68%
Wimbledon	A	1R	1R	F	SF	F	3R	QF	SF	NH	1R	A	3R	QF	QF	0 / 11	28–11	72%
US Open	A	1R	2R	1R	3R	3R	QF	F	QF	2R (Note: Withdrew during the tournament. Not counted as a loss.)	A	A	1R	1R	QF	0 / 11	17–10	63%
Win–loss	0–0	1–3	1–4	7–4	8–4	10–4	8–4	17–3	17–3	13–0	0–2	0–0	4–4	4–4	10–4	4 / 47	98–41	71%
Year-end championships
WTA Finals	DNQ				RR	QF	W	W	W	NH	DNQ					3 / 5	12–3	80%
National representation
Summer Olympics	NH	1R	Not Held			1R	Not Held				A	Not Held		A	NH	0 / 2	0–2	0%
WTA 1000 tournaments
Qatar Open	NTI	A	A	A	NTI	QF	NTI	QF	NTI	SF	NTI	A	NTI	1R	1R	0 / 5	4–5	44%
Dubai Championships	A	Not Tier I			W	NTI	A	NTI	2R	NTI	SF	NTI	2R	2R	1R	1 / 6	10–5	67%
Indian Wells Open	A	A	A	1R	1R	SF	1R	SF	1R	NH	A	A	A	A	QF	0 / 7	8–7	53%
Miami Open	A	A	2R	1R	SF	F	2R	1R	1R	NH	2R	A	1R	A	2R	0 / 10	11–10	52%
Madrid Open	A	A	A	A	A	QF	F	F	A	NH	A	A	1R	1R	1R	0 / 6	8–6	57%
Italian Open	A	A	A	A	W	QF	SF	QF	A	2R	A	A	QF	A	1R	1 / 7	8–6	57%
Canadian Open	A	1R	A	1R	A	1R	1R	QF	QF	NH	A	A	A	1R	2R	0 / 8	3–8	27%
Cincinnati Open	A	A	A	F	QF	QF	QF	QF	A	A	A	A	A	1R	2R	0 / 7	10–7	59%
China Open	A	1R	A	A	QF	2R	F	QF	QF	Not Held			A	2R	QF	0 / 8	10–8	56%
Wuhan Open	Not Held			A	2R	QF	A	QF	A	Not Held				A	2R	0 / 4	4–4	50%
Win–loss	0–0	0–2	1–1	4–4	13–5	14–9	12–7	11–9	3–5	2–2	4–2	0–0	2–4	2-6	8-6	2 / 68	76–66	54%
Career statistics
	2011	2012	2013	2014	2015	2016	2017	2018	2019	2020	2021	2022	2023	2024	2025	SR	W–L	Win %
Tournaments	1	14	17	21	20	22	22	17	14	5	7	6	8	21	20	Career total: 215		
Titles	0	1	4	2	3	0	6	3	3	2	0	0	0	1	3	Career total: 28		
Finals	0	1	5	6	3	3	8	5	4	2	0	0	0	1	3	Career total: 41		
Hard win–loss	0–0	0–6	17–8	20–11	17–12	24–16	27–7	23–9	19–10	9–1	4–2	1–3	4–6	5–14	18–9	15 / 132	188–112	63%
Clay win–loss	0–1	7–5	8–2	1–3	9–2	4–3	13–4	7–3	10–0	6–1	4–2	3–3	1–2	11–5	8–4	10 / 52	92–40	70%
Grass win–loss	0–0	3–2	0–2	6–3	7–2	7–3	5–4	8–2	3–1	0–0	0–1	0–0	0–0	3–1	7–4	2 / 29	49–25	66%
Carpet win–loss	0–0	0–0	0–0	2–1	0–0	0–0	4–0	0–0	0–0	0–0	0–0	0–0	0–0	0–0	0–0	1 / 2	6–1	86%
Overall win–loss	0–1	10–13	25–11	29–18	33–16	35–22	49–15	38–14	32–11	15–2	8–5	4–6	5–8	19–20	33–17	28 / 215	335–176	66%
Year-end ranking	145	90	45	21	11	15	7	3	3	4	25	92	63	55	13			

== Grand Slam tournaments finals ==
=== Doubles: 8 (4 titles, 4 runner-ups) ===
Result	Year	Tournament	Surface	Partner	Opponents	Score
Loss	2014	Wimbledon	Grass	(France) Kristina Mladenovic	(Italy) Sara Errani (Italy) Roberta Vinci	1–6, 3–6
Loss	2016	Wimbledon	Grass	(Kazakhstan) Yaroslava Shvedova	(United States) Serena Williams (United States) Venus Williams	3–6, 4–6
Win	2018	Australian Open	Hard	(France) Kristina Mladenovic	(Russia) Ekaterina Makarova (Russia) Elena Vesnina	6–4, 6–3
Loss	2018	US Open	Hard	(France) Kristina Mladenovic	(Australia) Ashleigh Barty (United States) CoCo Vandeweghe	6–3, 6–7^{(2–7)}, 6–7^{(6–8)}
Loss	2019	Australian Open	Hard	(France) Kristina Mladenovic	(Australia) Samantha Stosur (China) Zhang Shuai	3–6, 4–6
Win	2019	French Open	Clay	(France) Kristina Mladenovic	(China) Duan Yingying (China) Zheng Saisai	6–2, 6–3
Win	2020	Australian Open (2)	Hard	(France) Kristina Mladenovic	(Chinese Taipei) Hsieh Su-wei (Czech Republic) Barbora Strýcová	6–2, 6–1
Win	2020	French Open (2)	Clay	(France) Kristina Mladenovic	(Chile) Alexa Guarachi (United States) Desirae Krawczyk	6–4, 7–5

=== Mixed doubles: 2 (2 runner-ups) ===
Result	Year	Tournament	Surface	Partner	Opponents	Score
Loss	2015	Wimbledon	Grass	(Austria) Alexander Peya	(India) Leander Paes (Switzerland) Martina Hingis	1–6, 1–6
Loss	2018	Australian Open	Hard	(India) Rohan Bopanna	(Canada) Gabriela Dabrowski (Croatia) Mate Pavić	6–2, 4–6, [9–11]

== Other significant finals ==
=== Year-end championships ===
==== Doubles: 4 (3 titles, 1 runner-up) ====
Result	Year	Tournament	Surface	Partner	Opponents	Score
Win	2017	WTA Finals, Singapore	Hard (i)	(Czech Republic) Andrea Hlaváčková	(Netherlands) Kiki Bertens (Sweden) Johanna Larsson	4–6, 6–4, [10–5]
Win	2018	WTA Finals, Singapore (2)	Hard (i)	(France) Kristina Mladenovic	(Czech Republic) Barbora Krejčíková (Czech Republic) Kateřina Siniaková	6–4, 7–5
Win	2019	WTA Finals, China (3)	Hard (i)	(France) Kristina Mladenovic	(Chinese Taipei) Hsieh Su-wei (Czech Republic) Barbora Strýcová	6–1, 6–3
Loss	2025	WTA Finals, Saudi Arabia	Hard (i)	(Brazil) Luisa Stefani	Veronika Kudermetova (Belgium) Elise Mertens	6–7^{(4–7)}, 1–6

=== WTA 1000 tournaments ===
==== Doubles: 7 (2 titles, 5 runner-ups) ====
Result	Year	Tournament	Surface	Partner	Opponents	Score
Loss	2014	Cincinnati Open	Hard	(France) Kristina Mladenovic	(United States) Raquel Kops-Jones (United States) Abigail Spears	1–6, 0–2 ret.
Win	2015	Dubai Championships	Hard	(France) Kristina Mladenovic	(Spain) Garbiñe Muguruza (Spain) Carla Suárez Navarro	6–3, 6–2
Win	2015	Italian Open	Clay	(France) Kristina Mladenovic	(Switzerland) Martina Hingis (India) Sania Mirza	6–4, 6–3
Loss	2016	Miami Open	Hard	(Kazakhstan) Yaroslava Shvedova	(United States) Bethanie Mattek-Sands (Czech Republic) Lucie Šafářová	3–6, 4–6
Loss	2017	Madrid Open	Clay	(Czech Republic) Andrea Hlaváčková	(Chinese Taipei) Chan Yung-jan (Switzerland) Martina Hingis	4–6, 3–6
Loss	2017	China Open	Hard	(Czech Republic) Andrea Hlaváčková	(Chinese Taipei) Chan Yung-jan (Switzerland) Martina Hingis	1–6, 4–6
Loss	2018	Madrid Open	Clay	(France) Kristina Mladenovic	(Russia) Ekaterina Makarova (Russia) Elena Vesnina	6–2, 4–6, [8–10]

== WTA Tour finals ==
=== Singles: 8 (3 titles, 5 runner-ups) ===
Legend International (3–5)	Finals by surface Hard (3–3) Clay (0–1) Carpet (0–1)	Finals by setting Outdoor (1–4) Indoor (2–1)

Result	W–L	Date	Tournament	Tier	Surface	Opponent	Score
Win	1–0	Feb 2012	Monterrey Open, Mexico	International	Hard	(Romania) Alexandra Cadanțu	6–4, 6–4
Loss	1–1	May 2015	Rabat Grand Prix, Morocco	International	Clay	(Ukraine) Elina Svitolina	5–7, 6–7^{(3–7)}
Loss	1–2	Aug 2016	Brasil Tennis Cup, Brazil	International	Hard	(Romania) Irina-Camelia Begu	6–2, 4–6, 3–6
Win	2–2	Feb 2017	Hungarian Ladies Open, Hungary	International	Hard (i)	(Czech Republic) Lucie Šafářová	6–7^{(4–7)}, 6–4, 6–3
Loss	2–3	Sep 2017	Tournoi de Québec, Canada	International	Carpet (i)	(Belgium) Alison Van Uytvanck	7–5, 4–6, 1–6
Loss	2–4	Sep 2017	Tashkent Open, Uzbekistan	International	Hard	(Ukraine) Kateryna Bondarenko	4–6, 4–6
Win	3–4	Feb 2018	Taiwan Open, Taiwan	International	Hard (i)	(Ukraine) Kateryna Kozlova	7–5, 6–1
Loss	3–5	Apr 2018	Monterrey Open, Mexico	International	Hard	(Spain) Garbiñe Muguruza	6–3, 4–6, 3–6

=== Doubles: 44 (29 titles, 15 runner-ups) ===
Legend Grand Slam (4–4) WTA Finals (3–1) Premier M & Premier 5 (2–5) Premier / WTA 500 (7–2) International / WTA 250 (13–3)	Finals by surface Hard (15–11) Clay (10–2) Grass (2–2) Carpet (1–0)	Finals by setting Outdoor (21–13) Indoor (7–2)

Result	W–L	Date	Tournament	Tier	Surface	Partner	Opponents	Score
Win	1–0	Jun 2012	Birmingham Classic, United Kingdom	International	Grass	(Chinese Taipei) Hsieh Su-wei	(United States) Liezel Huber (United States) Lisa Raymond	7–5, 6–7^{(2–7)}, [10–8]
Loss	1–1	Jan 2013	Hobart International, Australia	International	Hard	(Luxembourg) Mandy Minella	(Spain) Garbiñe Muguruza (Spain) María Teresa Torró Flor	3–6, 6–7^{(5–7)}
Win	2–1	Feb 2013	Copa Colsanitas, Colombia	International	Clay	(Luxembourg) Mandy Minella	(Czech Republic) Eva Birnerová (Russia) Alexandra Panova	6–4, 6–3
Win	3–1	Apr 2013	Monterrey Open, Mexico	International	Hard	(Japan) Kimiko Date-Krumm	(Czech Republic) Eva Birnerová (Thailand) Tamarine Tanasugarn	6–1, 6–4
Win	4–1	Apr 2013	Rabat Grand Prix, Morocco	International	Clay	(Luxembourg) Mandy Minella	(Croatia) Petra Martić (France) Kristina Mladenovic	6–3, 6–1
Win	5–1	Sep 2013	Tashkent Open, Uzbekistan	International	Hard	(Kazakhstan) Yaroslava Shvedova	(Luxembourg) Mandy Minella (Belarus) Olga Govortsova	6–3, 6–3
Win	6–1	Jan 2014	Sydney International, Australia	Premier	Hard	(Czech Republic) Lucie Šafářová	(Italy) Sara Errani (Italy) Roberta Vinci	7–5, 3–6, [10–7]
Loss	6–2	Feb 2014	Open GDF Suez, France	Premier	Hard (i)	(France) Kristina Mladenovic	(Germany) Anna-Lena Grönefeld (Czech Republic) Květa Peschke	7–6^{(9–7)}, 4–6, [5–10]
Loss	6–3	Apr 2014	Monterrey Open, Mexico	International	Hard	(Belarus) Olga Govortsova	(Croatia) Darija Jurak (United States) Megan Moulton-Levy	6–7^{(5–7)}, 6–3, [9–11]
Win	7–3	Apr 2014	Malaysian Open, Malaysia	International	Hard	(Chinese Taipei) Chan Hao-ching	(Chinese Taipei) Latisha Chan (China) Zheng Saisai	6–3, 6–4
Loss	7–4	Jul 2014	Wimbledon, United Kingdom	Grand Slam	Grass	(France) Kristina Mladenovic	(Italy) Sara Errani (Italy) Roberta Vinci	1–6, 3–6
Loss	7–5	Aug 2014	Cincinnati Open, United States	Premier 5	Hard	(France) Kristina Mladenovic	(United States) Raquel Kops-Jones (United States) Abigail Spears	1–6, 0–2 ret.
Win	8–5	Feb 2015	Dubai Championships, UAE	Premier 5	Hard	(France) Kristina Mladenovic	(Spain) Garbiñe Muguruza (Spain) Carla Suárez Navarro	6–3, 6–2
Win	9–5	May 2015	Rabat Grand Prix, Morocco (2)	International	Clay	(France) Kristina Mladenovic	(Germany) Laura Siegemund (Ukraine) Maryna Zanevska	6–1, 7–6^{(7–5)}
Win	10–5	May 2015	Italian Open, Italy	Premier 5	Clay	(France) Kristina Mladenovic	(Switzerland) Martina Hingis (India) Sania Mirza	6–4, 6–3
Loss	10–6	Mar 2016	Miami Open, United States	Premier M	Hard	(Kazakhstan) Yaroslava Shvedova	(United States) Bethanie Mattek-Sands (Czech Republic) Lucie Šafářová	3–6, 4–6
Loss	10–7	Jul 2016	Wimbledon, United Kingdom	Grand Slam	Grass	(Kazakhstan) Yaroslava Shvedova	(United States) Serena Williams (United States) Venus Williams	3–6, 4–6
Loss	10–8	Aug 2016	Brasil Tennis Cup, Brazil	International	Hard	(Hungary) Réka Luca Jani	(Ukraine) Lyudmyla Kichenok (Ukraine) Nadiia Kichenok	3–6, 1–6
Win	11–8	Jan 2017	Sydney International, Australia (2)	Premier	Hard	(Russia) Anastasia Pavlyuchenkova	(India) Sania Mirza (Czech Republic) Barbora Strýcová	6–4, 6–4
Win	12–8	May 2017	Rabat Grand Prix, Morocco (3)	International	Clay	(Czech Republic) Andrea Hlaváčková	(Serbia) Nina Stojanović (Belgium) Maryna Zanevska	2–6, 6–3, [10–5]
Loss	12–9	May 2017	Madrid Open, Spain	Premier M	Clay	(Czech Republic) Andrea Hlaváčková	(Chinese Taipei) Latisha Chan (Switzerland) Martina Hingis	4–6, 3–6
Win	13–9	Sep 2017	Tournoi de Québec, Canada	International	Carpet (i)	(Czech Republic) Andrea Hlaváčková	(Canada) Bianca Andreescu (Canada) Carson Branstine	6–3, 6–1
Win	14–9	Sep 2017	Tashkent Open, Uzbekistan (2)	International	Hard	(Czech Republic) Andrea Hlaváčková	(Japan) Nao Hibino (Georgia (country)) Oksana Kalashnikova	7–5, 6–4
Loss	14–10	Oct 2017	China Open, China	Premier M	Hard	(Czech Republic) Andrea Hlaváčková	(Chinese Taipei) Latisha Chan (Switzerland) Martina Hingis	1–6, 4–6
Win	15–10	Oct 2017	Kremlin Cup, Russia	Premier	Hard (i)	(Czech Republic) Andrea Hlaváčková	(United States) Nicole Melichar (United Kingdom) Anna Smith	6–2, 3–6, [10–3]
Win	16–10	Oct 2017	WTA Finals, Singapore	Finals	Hard (i)	(Czech Republic) Andrea Hlaváčková	(Netherlands) Kiki Bertens (Sweden) Johanna Larsson	4–6, 6–4, [10–5]
Win	17–10	Jan 2018	Australian Open, Australia	Grand Slam	Hard	(France) Kristina Mladenovic	(Russia) Ekaterina Makarova (Russia) Elena Vesnina	6–4, 6–3
Loss	17–11	May 2018	Madrid Open, Spain	Premier M	Clay	(France) Kristina Mladenovic	(Russia) Ekaterina Makarova (Russia) Elena Vesnina	6–2, 4–6, [8–10]
Win	18–11	Jun 2018	Birmingham Classic, UK (2)	Premier	Grass	(France) Kristina Mladenovic	(Belgium) Elise Mertens (Netherlands) Demi Schuurs	4–6, 6–3, [10–8]
Loss	18–12	Sep 2018	US Open, United States	Grand Slam	Hard	(France) Kristina Mladenovic	(Australia) Ashleigh Barty (United States) CoCo Vandeweghe	6–3, 6–7^{(2–7)}, 6–7^{(6–8)}
Win	19–12	Oct 2018	WTA Finals, Singapore (2)	Finals	Hard (i)	(France) Kristina Mladenovic	(Czech Republic) Barbora Krejčíková (Czech Republic) Kateřina Siniaková	6–4, 7–5
Loss	19–13	Jan 2019	Australian Open, Australia	Grand Slam	Hard	(France) Kristina Mladenovic	(Australia) Samantha Stosur (China) Zhang Shuai	3–6, 4–6
Win	20–13	Apr 2019	İstanbul Cup, Turkey	International	Clay	(France) Kristina Mladenovic	(Chile) Alexa Guarachi (United States) Sabrina Santamaria	6–1, 6–0
Win	21–13	Jun 2019	French Open, France	Grand Slam	Clay	(France) Kristina Mladenovic	(China) Duan Yingying (China) Zheng Saisai	6–2, 6–3
Win	22–13	Nov 2019	WTA Finals, China (3)	Finals	Hard (i)	(France) Kristina Mladenovic	(Chinese Taipei) Hsieh Su-wei (Czech Republic) Barbora Strýcová	6–1, 6–3
Win	23–13	Jan 2020	Australian Open (2)	Grand Slam	Hard	(France) Kristina Mladenovic	(Chinese Taipei) Hsieh Su-wei (Czech Republic) Barbora Strýcová	6–2, 6–1
Win	24–13	Oct 2020	French Open, France (2)	Grand Slam	Clay	(France) Kristina Mladenovic	(Chile) Alexa Guarachi (United States) Desirae Krawczyk	6–4, 7–5
Win	25–13	Apr 2024	Open de Rouen, France	WTA 250	Clay (i)	Irina Khromacheva	(United Kingdom) Naiktha Bains (United Kingdom) Maia Lumsden	6–3, 6–4
Win	26–13	Jan 2025	Linz Open, Austria	WTA 500	Hard (i)	(Brazil) Luisa Stefani	(Ukraine) Lyudmyla Kichenok (Ukraine) Nadiia Kichenok	3–6, 7–5, [10–4]
Win	27–13	May 2025	Internationaux de Strasbourg, France	WTA 500	Clay	(Brazil) Luisa Stefani	(United States) Nicole Melichar-Martinez (China) Guo Hanyu	6–3, 6–7^{(4–7)}, [10–7]
Win	28–13	Sep 2025	SP Open, Brasil	WTA 250	Hard	(Brazil) Luisa Stefani	(Brazil) Laura Pigossi (Brazil) Ingrid Martins	4–6, 6–3, [10–4]
Loss	28–14	Oct 2025	Ningbo Open, China	WTA 500	Hard	(Brazil) Luisa Stefani	(United States) Nicole Melichar-Martinez; Liudmila Samsonova	7-5, 4–6, [8–10]
Win	29–14	Oct 2025	Pan Pacific Open, Japan	WTA 500	Hard	(Brazil) Luisa Stefani	(Kazakhstan) Anna Danilina (Serbia) Aleksandra Krunić	6–1, 6–4
Loss	29–15	Nov 2025	WTA Finals, Saudi Arabia	Finals	Hard (i)	(Brazil) Luisa Stefani	Veronika Kudermetova (Belgium) Elise Mertens	6–7^{(4–7)}, 1–6

== WTA 125 finals ==
=== Singles: 2 (1 title, 1 runner-up) ===
Result	W–L	Date	Tournament	Surface	Opponent	Score
Win	1–0	Nov 2015	Taipei Open, Taiwan	Carpet (i)	(Japan) Misaki Doi	7–5, 6–3
Loss	1–1	Nov 2019	Taipei Open, Taiwan	Carpet (i)	(Russia) Vitalia Diatchenko	3–6, 2–6

=== Doubles: 6 (1 title, 5 runner-ups) ===
Result	W–L	Date	Tournament	Surface	Partner	Opponents	Score
Win	1–0	Aug 2013	Suzhou Ladies Open, China	Hard	(Netherlands) Michaëlla Krajicek	(China) Han Xinyun (Japan) Eri Hozumi	6–2, 6–2
Loss	1–1	Nov 2014	Open de Limoges, France	Hard (i)	(France) Kristina Mladenovic	(Czech Republic) Kateřina Siniaková (Czech Republic) Renata Voráčová	6–2, 2–6, [5–10]
Loss	1–2	Aug 2022	Vancouver Open, Canada	Hard	(United States) Angela Kulikov	(Japan) Miyu Kato (United States) Asia Muhammad	3–6, 5–7
Loss	1–3	Dec 2023	Andorrà Open, Andorra	Hard (i)	(United Kingdom) Heather Watson	Erika Andreeva (Switzerland) Céline Naef	1–6, 2–6
Loss	1–4	Mar 2024	Antalya Challenger, Turkey	Clay	Vera Zvonareva	(Italy) Angelica Moratelli (Italy) Camilla Rosatello	3–6, 6–3, [13–15]
Loss	1–5	Apr 2024	Solgironès Open, Spain	Clay	(Hungary) Dalma Gálfi	(Czech Republic) Miriam Škoch (Czech Republic) Anna Sisková	walkover

== ITF Circuit finals ==
=== Singles: 25 (15 titles, 10 runner-ups) ===
Legend $100,000 tournaments (1–1) $75,000 tournaments (1–1) $50/60,000 tournaments (2–3) $25,000 tournaments (8–2) $10,000 tournaments (3–3)	Finals by surface Hard (10–6) Clay (5–2) Grass (0–2)

Result	W–L	Date	Tournament	Tier	Surface	Opponent	Score
Loss	0–1	Apr 2009	ITF Bournemouth, United Kingdom	10,000	Clay	(Germany) Svenja Weidemann	6–4, 3–6, 4–6
Win	1–1	May 2009	ITF Edinburgh, United Kingdom	10,000	Clay	(United Kingdom) Naomi Broady	6–4, 6–7^{(3–7)}, 7–6^{(10–8)}
Loss	1–2	Jul 2009	ITF Felixstowe, United Kingdom	10,000	Grass	(United Kingdom) Anna Smith	5–7, 6–3, 4–6
Win	2–2	Nov 2009	ITF Sunderland, United Kingdom	10,000	Hard	(Croatia) Matea Mezak	7–6^{(7–2)}, 6–4
Loss	2–3	Nov 2009	ITF Jersey, United Kingdom	10,000	Hard	(Croatia) Matea Mezak	2–6, 3–6
Win	3–3	May 2010	ITF Edinburgh, United Kingdom	10,000	Clay	(United Kingdom) Tara Moore	6–2, 6–2
Loss	3–4	Jun 2010	ITF Budapest, Hungary	25,000	Clay	(France) Mathilde Johansson	7–6^{(7–4)}, 1–6, 0–6
Win	4–4	Jul 2010	GB Pro-Series Foxhills, United Kingdom	25,000	Hard	(United Kingdom) Katie O'Brien	7–5, 6–4
Win	5–4	Nov 2010	Bendigo International, Australia	25,000	Hard	(Bulgaria) Elitsa Kostova	3–6, 6–3, 7–5
Win	6–4	Jun 2011	ITF Astana, Kazakhstan	25,000	Hard	(Slovenia) Tadeja Majerič	6–0, 6–2
Win	7–4	Jul 2011	ITF Stuttgart, Germany	25,000	Clay	(Germany) Korina Perkovic	1–6, 6–2, 6–3
Win	8–4	Oct 2011	Challenger de Saguenay, Canada	50,000	Hard (i)	(United States) Julia Boserup	7–6^{(9–7)}, 6–3
Win	9–4	Nov 2011	ITF Helsinki, Finland	25,000	Hard (i)	(Slovakia) Jana Čepelová	6–3, 6–1
Loss	9–5	Jan 2012	Blossom Cup, China	50,000+H	Hard	(Japan) Kimiko Date-Krumm	3–6, 3–6
Win	10–5	May 2013	Johannesburg Open, South Africa	50,000+H	Hard	(South Africa) Chanel Simmonds	6–7^{(3–7)}, 6–4, 6–1
Loss	10–6	Jul 2013	Donetsk Cup, Ukraine	75,000	Hard	(Ukraine) Elina Svitolina	6–3, 2–6, 6–7^{(9–11)}
Loss	10–7	Oct 2013	Toronto Challenger, Canada	50,000	Hard (i)	(United States) Victoria Duval	5–7, ret.
Win	11–7	Apr 2014	Kangaroo Cup Gifu, Japan	75,000	Hard	(Russia) Ekaterina Bychkova	6–1, 6–2
Win	12–7	Oct 2014	Internationaux de Poitiers, France	100,000	Hard (i)	(France) Océane Dodin	6–3, 4–6, 7–5
Loss	12–8	Jun 2019	Ilkley Trophy, United Kingdom	100,000	Grass	(Romania) Monica Niculescu	2–6, 6–4, 3–6
Loss	12–9	Oct 2021	ITF Hamburg, Germany	25,000	Hard (i)	(Croatia) Antonia Ružić	2–6, 1–4 ret.
Loss	12–10	Mar 2023	Pretoria International, South Africa	60,000	Hard	Alina Korneeva	3–6, 6–7^{(3–7)}
Win	13–10	Apr 2023	ITF Jackson, United States	25,000	Clay	(United States) Whitney Osuigwe	7–5, 7–5
Win	14–10	Apr 2023	ITF Sharm El Sheikh, Egypt	25,000	Hard	Maria Timofeeva	6–4, 6–1
Win	15–10	May 2023	ITF Larnaca, Cyprus	25,000	Clay	(Cyprus) Raluca Șerban	6–4, 5–7, 7–6^{(7–5)}

=== Doubles: 26 (14 titles, 12 runner-ups) ===
Legend $100,000 tournaments (4–2) $50/60,000 tournaments (2–3) $25,000 tournaments (7–5) $10,000 tournaments (1–2)	Finals by surface Hard (10–8) Clay (4–4)

Result	W–L	Date	Tournament	Tier	Surface	Partner	Opponents	Score
Win	1–0	Apr 2009	ITF Bournemouth, United Kingdom	10,000	Clay	(United Kingdom) Stephanie Cornish	(France) Elixane Lechemia (France) Alizé Lim	w/o
Loss	1–1	Nov 2009	ITF Jersey, United Kingdom	10,000	Hard	(Denmark) Malou Ejdesgaard	(Netherlands) Kiki Bertens (Netherlands) Daniëlle Harmsen	5–7, 5–7
Loss	1–2	Feb 2010	Burnie International, Australia	25,000	Hard	(Russia) Anna Arina Marenko	(Australia) Jessica Moore (Australia) Arina Rodionova	2–6, 4–6
Loss	1–3	May 2010	ITF Edinburgh, United Kingdom	10,000	Clay	(United Kingdom) Tara Moore	(United Kingdom) Amanda Elliott (United Kingdom) Jocelyn Rae	6–7^{(5–7)}, 4–6
Win	2–3	Jul 2010	GB Pro-Series Foxhills, UK	25,000	Hard	(Finland) Emma Laine	(United Kingdom) Jocelyn Rae (Australia) Emelyn Starr	6–2, 6–2
Loss	2–4	Nov 2010	ITF Kalgoorlie, Australia	25,000	Hard	(Australia) Monika Wejnert	(Australia) Daniella Dominikovic (Australia) Jessica Moore	4–6, 6–2, [6–10]
Win	3–4	Nov 2010	ITF Wellington, New Zealand	25,000	Hard	(Australia) Tammi Patterson	(Australia) Jarmila Groth (Australia) Jade Hopper	6–3, 6–2
Win	4–4	Nov 2010	ITF Traralgon, Australia	25,000	Hard	(United Kingdom) Melanie South	(Australia) Jarmila Groth (Australia) Jade Hopper	6–3, 6–2
Win	5–4	Nov 2010	Bendigo International, Australia	25,000	Hard	(United Kingdom) Melanie South	(Australia) Jarmila Groth (Australia) Jade Hopper	6–3, 6–2
Win	6–4	Mar 2011	ITF Irapuato, Mexico	25,000	Hard	(Australia) Johanna Konta	(United States) Macall Harkins (Austria) Nicole Rottmann	6–3, 6–4
Win	7–4	Mar 2011	GB Pro-Series Bath, UK	25,000	Hard (i)	(Luxembourg) Anne Kremer	(Poland) Marta Domachowska (Poland) Katarzyna Piter	7–6^{(7–5)}, 6–2
Loss	7–5	Jun 2011	ITF Kristinehamn, Sweden	25,000	Clay	(Russia) Ksenia Lykina	(Bosnia and Herzegovina) Mervana Jugić-Salkić (Finland) Emma Laine	4–6, 4–6
Win	8–5	Jul 2011	ITF La Coruña, Spain	25,000	Hard	(France) Victoria Larrière	(Spain) Leticia Costas (Spain) Inés Ferrer Suárez	7–5, 6–3
Loss	8–6	Sep 2011	Save Cup Mestre, Italy	50,000	Clay	(Poland) Magda Linette	(Ukraine) Valentyna Ivakhnenko (Russia) Marina Melnikova	4–6, 5–7
Win	9–6	Oct 2011	Challenger de Saguenay, Canada	50,000	Hard (i)	(United States) Jessica Pegula	(Canada) Gabriela Dabrowski (Canada) Marie-Ève Pelletier	6–4, 6–3
Loss	9–7	Nov 2011	Toronto Challenger, Canada	50,000	Hard (i)	(United States) Jessica Pegula	(Canada) Gabriela Dabrowski (Canada) Marie-Ève Pelletier	5–7, 7–6^{(7–5)}, [4–10]
Loss	9–8	Nov 2011	ITF Helsinki, Finland	25,000	Hard (i)	(Ukraine) Irina Buryachok	(Slovakia) Janette Husárová (Finland) Emma Laine	7–5, 5–7, [9–11]
Loss	9–9	Apr 2022	Pretoria International, South Africa	W60	Hard	Anastasia Tikhonova	(Hong Kong) Eudice Chong (Hong Kong) Cody Wong	5–7, 7–5, [11–13]
Win	10–9	May 2022	Bonita Springs Championship, US	W100	Clay	(Japan) Nao Hibino	Olga Govortsova (Poland) Katarzyna Kawa	6–4, 3–6, [10–7]
Loss	10–10	Jul 2022	ITF Charleston Pro, US	W100	Clay	(Mexico) Marcela Zacarías	(United States) Alycia Parks (United States) Sachia Vickery	4–6, 7–5, [5–10]
Win	11–10	Nov 2022	Barranquilla Open, Colombia	W60	Clay	(Ukraine) Kateryna Volodko	(Brazil) Carolina Alves (Ukraine) Valeriya Strakhova	3–6, 7–5, [10–7]
Win	12–10	Dec 2022	Dubai Tennis Challenge, United Arab Emirates	W100+H	Hard	(France) Kristina Mladenovic	(Poland) Magdalena Fręch (Ukraine) Kateryna Volodko	6–1, 6–3
Loss	12–11	Mar 2023	Pretoria International, South Africa	W25	Hard	(Spain) Georgina Garcia Perez	(United States) Emina Bektas (Israel) Lina Glushko	3–6, 6–4, [11–13]
Win	13–11	Aug 2023	ITF Maspalomas, Spain	W100	Clay	(Hungary) Anna Bondar	(Spain) Leyre Romero Gormaz (Netherlands) Arantxa Rus	6–4, 3–6, [10–4]
Loss	13–12	Oct 2023	Shenzhen Longhua Open, China	W100	Hard	(Ukraine) Kateryna Volodko	(France) Kristina Mladenovic (Japan) Moyuka Uchijima	2–6, 5–7
Win	14–12	Dec 2023	Dubai Tennis Challenge, U.A.E.	W100	Hard	Vera Zvonareva	(United Kingdom) Olivia Nicholls (United Kingdom) Heather Watson	6–1, 2–6, [10–7]

== Junior finals ==
=== Grand Slam tournaments ===
==== Doubles: 5 (3 titles, 2 runner-ups) ====
Result	Year	Tournament	Surface	Partner	Opponents	Score
Loss	2009	French Open	Clay	(United Kingdom) Heather Watson	(Romania) Elena Bogdan (Thailand) Noppawan Lertcheewakarn	6–3, 3–6, [8–10]
Loss	2010	Australian Open	Hard	(Canada) Gabriela Dabrowski	(Slovakia) Jana Čepelová (Slovakia) Chantal Škamlová	6–7^{(1–7)}, 2–6
Win	2010	French Open	Clay	(United States) Sloane Stephens	(Spain) Lara Arruabarrena (Spain) María Teresa Torró Flor	6–2, 6–3
Win	2010	Wimbledon	Grass	(United States) Sloane Stephens	(Russia) Irina Khromacheva (Ukraine) Elina Svitolina	6–7^{(7–9)}, 6–2, 6–2
Win	2010	US Open	Hard	(United States) Sloane Stephens	(Belgium) An-Sophie Mestach (Croatia) Silvia Njirić	w/o

== WTA Tour career earnings ==
As of 15 September 2025

Year	Grand Slam singles titles	WTA singles titles	Total singles titles	Earnings ($)	Money list rank
2012	–	1	1	n/a	n/a
2013	–	–	0	259,689	99
2014	–	–	0	467,418	60
2015	–	–	0	730,327	43
2016	–	–	0	1,222,057	28
2017	–	1	1	1,129,393	34
2018	–	1	1	1,578,697	26
2019	–	–	0	1,541,943	25
2020	–	–	0	707,628	22
2021	–	–	0	274,906	131
2022	–	–	0	59,656	298
2023	–	–	0	95,998	187
2024	–	–	0	105,471	172
Career	0	3	3	8,227,595	69

== Career Grand Slam statistics ==
=== Seedings ===
The tournaments won by Babos are in boldface, and advanced into finals by Babos are in italics.

==== Singles ====
Year	Australian Open	French Open	Wimbledon	US Open
2011	A	A	A	DNQ
2012	DNQ	–	–	–
2013	–	DNQ	–	–
2014	–	DNQ	–	–
2015	–	–	–	–
2016	–	–	–	31st
2017	25th	–	–	–
2018	–	–	–	–
2019	–	LL	DNQ	Q
2020	–	–	cancelled	–
2021	Q	DNQ	–	A
2022	A	A	DNQ	A

==== Doubles ====
Year	Australian Open	French Open	Wimbledon	US Open
2012	A	–	–	–
2013	–	–	–	–
2014	–	–	14th	7th
2015	10th	3rd	4th	3rd
2016	4th	4th	5th	3rd
2017	–	5th	4th	5th
2018	**5th**	1st	1st	2nd
2019	2nd	**2nd**	1st	1st
2020	**2nd**	**2nd**	cancelled	1st
2021	A	7th	2nd	A
2022	A	A	A	A
2023	–	–	–	–
2024	–	–	–	–
2025	13th	14th	10th	11th

- Key: (A) absent; (Q) qualifier; (DNQ) did not qualify; (RT) retired; (NH) Not Held; (–) unseeded; (LL) lucky looser.

== Wins against top 10 players ==
Season	2014	...	2018	Total
Wins	1		1	2

	Player	Rk	Event	Surface	Rd	Score	Rk	Years	Ref
1	(Romania) Simona Halep	10	Fed Cup, Hungary	Hard (i)	RR	1–6, 6–3, 7–5	83	2014	
2	(United States) CoCo Vandeweghe	9	Australian Open, Australia	Hard	1R	7–6^{(7–4)}, 6–2	51	2018	

- Key: (Rk) first use, opponent rank; (Rd) round; (Rk) 2nd use, player rank; (Ref) reference; (F) final; (SF) semifinal; (QF) quarterfinal; (#R) rounds 4, 3, 2, 1; (RR) round-robin stage; (Q#) qualifying rounds or stages (3), 2, 1.

== Longest winning streaks ==
=== 15–match doubles winning streak (2017–18) ===
#	Tournament	Category	Start date	Surface	Partner	Rd	Opponent	Rank	Score	TBR
–	China Open	Premier Mandatory	2 October 2017	Hard	(Czech Republic) Andrea Hlaváčková	F	(Chinese Taipei) Chan Yung-jan (1) (Switzerland) Martina Hingis (1)	No. 2 No. 1	1–6, 4–6	16
1	Kremlin Cup, Russia	Premier	16 October 2017	Hard (i)	(Czech Republic) Andrea Hlaváčková	1R	(France) Alizé Cornet (France) Kristina Mladenovic	No. 116; No. 19	6–7^{(7–9)}, 7–6^{(7–5)}, [10–8]	14
2	Kremlin Cup, Russia	Premier	16 October 2017	Hard (i)	(Czech Republic) Andrea Hlaváčková	QF	(Belarus) Vera Lapko (Russia) Anastasia Potapova	No. 115; No. 324	7–5, 6–2	14
3	Kremlin Cup, Russia	Premier	16 October 2017	Hard (i)	(Czech Republic) Andrea Hlaváčková	SF	(Czech Republic) Barbora Krejčíková (3) (Czech Republic) Kateřina Siniaková (3)	No. 60; No. 12	4–6, 6–1, [10–8]	14
4	Kremlin Cup, Russia	Premier	16 October 2017	Hard (i)	(Czech Republic) Andrea Hlaváčková	F	(United States) Nicole Melichar (United Kingdom) Anna Smith	No. 47; No. 55	6–2, 3–6, [10–3]	14
5	WTA Finals, Singapore	Year-end championships	23 October 2017	Hard (i)	(Czech Republic) Andrea Hlaváčková	QF	(Slovenia) Andreja Klepač (7) (Spain) María José Martínez Sánchez (7)	No. 23; No. 23	6–3, 6–4	12
6	WTA Finals, Singapore	Year-end championships	23 October 2017	Hard (i)	(Czech Republic) Andrea Hlaváčková	SF	(Chinese Taipei) Chan Yung-jan (1) (Switzerland) Martina Hingis (1)	No. 1 No. 1	6–4, 7–6^{(7–5)}	12
7	WTA Finals, Singapore	Year-end championships	23 October 2017	Hard (i)	(Czech Republic) Andrea Hlaváčková	F	(Netherlands) Kiki Bertens (8) (Sweden) Johanna Larsson (8)	No. 25; No. 28	4–6, 6–4, [10–5]	12
8	Australian Open, Australia	Grand Slam	15 January 2018	Hard	(France) Kristina Mladenovic	1R	(Russia) Natela Dzalamidze (Switzerland) Xenia Knoll	No. 76; No. 58	7–5, 6–3	7
9	Australian Open, Australia	Grand Slam	15 January 2018	Hard	(France) Kristina Mladenovic	2R	(Spain) Lara Arruabarrena (PR) (Spain) Arantxa Parra Santonja (PR)	No. 66; No. 93	3–6, 6–3, 6–4	7
10	Australian Open, Australia	Grand Slam	15 January 2018	Hard	(France) Kristina Mladenovic	3R	(Switzerland) Viktorija Golubic (Serbia) Nina Stojanović	No. 63; No. 56	7–5, 6–2	7
11	Australian Open, Australia	Grand Slam	15 January 2018	Hard	(France) Kristina Mladenovic	QF	(Chinese Taipei) Latisha Chan (1) (Czech Republic) Andrea Sestini Hlaváčková (1)	No. 1 No. 5	6–4, 0–6, 7–6^{(8–6)}	7
12	Australian Open, Australia	Grand Slam	15 January 2018	Hard	(France) Kristina Mladenovic	SF	(Chinese Taipei) Hsieh Su-wei (8) (China) Peng Shuai (8)	No. 34; No. 10	6–4, 6–2	7
13	Australian Open, Australia	Grand Slam	15 January 2018	Hard	(France) Kristina Mladenovic	F	(Russia) Ekaterina Makarova (2) (Russia) Elena Vesnina (2)	No. 3 No. 3	6–4, 6–3	7
14	Taiwan Open, Taiwan	International	29 January 2018	Hard (i)	(Chinese Taipei) Chan Hao-ching	1R	(Russia) Anna Blinkova (Poland) Magda Linette	No. 116; No. 143	3–6, 6–0, [10–5]	5
15	Taiwan Open, Taiwan	International	29 January 2018	Hard (i)	(Chinese Taipei) Chan Hao-ching	QF	(Japan) Eri Hozumi (Japan) Junri Namigata	No. 56; No. 120	6–1, 6–4	5
–	Taiwan Open, Taiwan	International	29 January 2018	Hard (i)	(Chinese Taipei) Chan Hao-ching	SF	(Japan) Nao Hibino (Georgia (country)) Oksana Kalashnikova	No. 48; No. 63	2–6, 2–6	5
