= 2018 Taiwan Open =

- Date: 29 January – 4 February
- Edition: 3rd
- Category: International
- Draw: 32S / 16D
- Prize money: $250,000
- Surface: Hard (i)
- Location: Taipei, Taiwan
- Venue: Heping Basketball Gymnasium

Champions

Singles
- (Hungary) Tímea Babos

Doubles
- (China) Duan Yingying / (China) Wang Yafan
- Taiwan Open

The 2018 Taiwan Open was a women's professional tennis tournament played on indoor hard courts in Taipei, Taiwan. It was the third edition of the tournament and part of the WTA International category of the 2018 WTA Tour. Fourth-seeded Tímea Babos won the singles title.

== Finals ==
=== Singles ===
- (Hungary) Tímea Babos defeated (Ukraine) Kateryna Kozlova, 7–5, 6–1
- It was Babos' only singles title of the year and the third of her career.

=== Doubles ===
(China) Duan Yingying / (China) Wang Yafan defeated (Japan) Nao Hibino / (Georgia (country)) Oksana Kalashnikova, 7–6^{(7–4)}, 7–6^{(7–5)}

== Points and prize money ==
=== Point distribution ===
Event^{1}	W	F	SF	QF	Round of 16	Round of 32	Q	Q2	Q1
Singles	280	180	110	60	30	1	18	12	1
Doubles	280	180	110	60	1	—N/a	—N/a	—N/a	—N/a

=== Prize money ===
Event	W	F	SF	QF	Round of 16	Round of 32^{2}	Q2	Q1
Singles	$43,000	$21,400	$11,500	$6,175	$3,400	$2,100	$1,020	$600
Doubles *	$12,300	$6,400	$3,435	$1,820	$960	—N/a	—N/a	—N/a

_{^{1} Qualifiers' prize money is also the Round of 32 prize money}
_{* per team}

== Singles main-draw entrants ==
=== Seeds ===
Country	Player	Rank^{1}	Seed
CHN	Peng Shuai	27	1
CHN	Zhang Shuai	34	2
AUS	Samantha Stosur	41	3
HUN	Tímea Babos	51	4
KAZ	Yulia Putintseva	54	5
KAZ	Zarina Diyas	60	6
POL	Magda Linette	74	7
FRA	Pauline Parmentier	82	8

- ^{1} Rankings as of January 15, 2018.

=== Other entrants ===
The following players received wildcards into the singles main draw:

- (Canada) Eugenie Bouchard
- (Chinese Taipei) Chang Kai-chen
- (Chinese Taipei) Lee Ya-hsuan

The following players received entry using a protected ranking:

- (Germany) Sabine Lisicki
- (China) Wang Yafan

The following players received entry from the qualifying draw:

- (Russia) Anna Blinkova
- (Australia) Lizette Cabrera
- (China) Han Xinyun
- (Slovenia) Dalila Jakupović
- (Japan) Junri Namigata
- (China) Zhang Yuxuan

The following player received entry as a lucky loser:

- (China) Lu Jingjing

=== Withdrawals ===
Before the tournament

- (Switzerland) Belinda Bencic → replaced by (Japan) Kurumi Nara
- (Russia) Margarita Gasparyan → replaced by (China) Wang Yafan
- (Australia) Daria Gavrilova → replaced by (China) Zhu Lin
- (Ukraine) Elina Svitolina → replaced by (China) Lu Jingjing
- (Ukraine) Lesia Tsurenko → replaced by (Romania) Ana Bogdan
- (Belgium) Alison Van Uytvanck → replaced by (Japan) Risa Ozaki

=== Retirements ===
- (Tunisia) Ons Jabeur
- (China) Zhu Lin

== Doubles main-draw entrants ==
=== Seeds ===
Country	Player	Country	Player	Rank^{1}	Seed
HUN	Tímea Babos	TPE	Chan Hao-ching	24	1
JPN	Miyu Kato	JPN	Makoto Ninomiya	79	2
UKR	Lyudmyla Kichenok	UKR	Nadiia Kichenok	96	3
AUS	Monique Adamczak	AUS	Storm Sanders	121	4

- ^{1} Rankings as of January 15, 2018.

=== Other entrants ===
The following pairs received wildcards into the doubles main draw:

- (Chinese Taipei) Chan Chin-wei / (Chinese Taipei) Liang En-shuo
- (Chinese Taipei) Hsu Ching-wen / (Chinese Taipei) Lee Ya-hsuan

== See also ==
- List of sporting events in Taiwan
