= 2017 Taiwan Open – Singles =

Singles
- 2017 Taiwan Open

Final
- Champion: (Ukraine) Elina Svitolina
- Runner-up: (China) Peng Shuai
- Score: 6–3, 6–2

Details
- Draw: 32
- Seeds: 8

Events
Singles	Doubles
- Taiwan Open

Venus Williams was the defending champion, but chose to compete in St. Petersburg instead.

Elina Svitolina won the title, defeating Peng Shuai in the final, 6–3, 6–2.

== Seeds ==
1. (Ukraine) Elina Svitolina (champion)
2. (Australia) Samantha Stosur (quarterfinals)
3. (France) Caroline Garcia (second round)
4. (Latvia) Anastasija Sevastova (second round)
5. (Czech Republic) Kateřina Siniaková (second round)
6. (Japan) Misaki Doi (quarterfinals)
7. (United States) Shelby Rogers (second round)
8. (Serbia) Jelena Janković (first round)

== Draw ==
Key

- Q = Qualifier
- WC = Wild card
- LL = Lucky loser
- Alt = Alternate
- ITF = ITF entry
- PR = Protected ranking
- SR = Special ranking
- SE = Special exempt
- JE = Junior exempt
- JR = Junior Accelerator Programme entrant
- CO = College Accelerator Programme entrant
- NG = Next Gen Accelerator Program entrant
- w/o = Walkover
- r = Retired
- d = Defaulted

=== Finals ===
Semifinals
1	(Ukraine) Elina Svitolina	6	6
(Luxembourg) Mandy Minella	3	2
WC	(Czech Republic) Lucie Šafářová	4	2
(China) Peng Shuai	6	6

Final
1	(Ukraine) Elina Svitolina	6	6
(China) Peng Shuai	3	2

=== Top half ===
First round
1	(Ukraine) E Svitolina	6	6
(Russia) E Rodina	0	3
(Ukraine) K Kozlova	6^{3}	6	1
Q	(Czech Republic) L Hradecká	7^{7}	4	6
(United States) N Gibbs	4	6	1
Q	(Tunisia) O Jabeur	6	4	6
WC	(Chinese Taipei) Y-h Lee	3	4
7	(United States) S Rogers	6	6
3	(France) C Garcia	6	6
Q	(New Zealand) M Erakovic	3	2
(Luxembourg) M Minella	1	7^{7}	6
(Slovakia) J Čepelová	6	6^{2}	4
(Poland) M Linette	3	7	4
(China) L Zhu	6	5	6
(Japan) K Nara	6^{4}	7	6
8	(Serbia) J Janković	7^{7}	5	4

Second round
1	(Ukraine) E Svitolina	6	7
Q	(Czech Republic) L Hradecká	4	5
Q	(Tunisia) O Jabeur	7	6
7	(United States) S Rogers	5	2
3	(France) C Garcia	4	4
(Luxembourg) M Minella	6	6
(China) L Zhu	4	6	6
(Japan) K Nara	6	1	2

Quarterfinals
1	(Ukraine) E Svitolina	6	3	7^{7}
Q	(Tunisia) O Jabeur	1	6	6^{4}
(Luxembourg) M Minella	1	6	7
(China) L Zhu	6	3	5

Semifinals
1	(Ukraine) E Svitolina	6	6
(Luxembourg) M Minella	3	2

=== Bottom half ===
First round
6	(Japan) M Doi	6	2	6
(Japan) N Hibino	2	6	4
(Romania) S Cîrstea	6^{3}	2^{r}
(Japan) R Ozaki	7^{7}	3
WC	(Czech Republic) L Šafářová	6	6
Q	(Serbia) A Krunić	3	4
Q	(Japan) M Kato	0	4
4	(Latvia) A Sevastova	6	6
5	(Czech Republic) K Siniaková	5	6	6
PR	(Kazakhstan) G Voskoboeva	7	4	2
(China) S Zheng	2	2
(China) S Peng	6	6
Q	(Slovenia) D Jakupović	7^{7}	6
(Italy) F Schiavone	6^{2}	3
(Montenegro) D Kovinić	2	4
2/WC	(Australia) S Stosur	6	6

Second round
6	(Japan) M Doi	6	6
(Japan) R Ozaki	4	3
WC	(Czech Republic) L Šafářová	6	6
4	(Latvia) A Sevastova	2	4
5	(Czech Republic) K Siniaková	1	3
(China) S Peng	6	6
Q	(Slovenia) D Jakupović	6	5	3
2/WC	(Australia) S Stosur	3	7	6

Quarterfinals
6	(Japan) M Doi	4	6^{1}
WC	(Czech Republic) L Šafářová	6	7^{7}
(China) S Peng	6	6
2/WC	(Australia) S Stosur	4	4

Semifinals
WC	(Czech Republic) L Šafářová	4	2
(China) S Peng	6	6

== Qualifying ==
=== Seeds ===
1. (New Zealand) Marina Erakovic (qualified)
2. (Chinese Taipei) Chang Kai-chen (first round)
3. (Serbia) Aleksandra Krunić (qualified)
4. (China) Zhang Kailin (first round)
5. (United Kingdom) Tara Moore (qualifying competition)
6. (Slovenia) Dalila Jakupović (qualified)
7. (Tunisia) Ons Jabeur (qualified)
8. (Czech Republic) Lucie Hradecká (qualified)
9. (Japan) Miyu Kato (qualified)
10. (Israel) Julia Glushko (qualifying competition)
11. (Australia) Lizette Cabrera (first round)
12. (Switzerland) Conny Perrin (qualifying competition)

=== Qualifiers ===
1. (New Zealand) Marina Erakovic
2. (Japan) Miyu Kato
3. (Serbia) Aleksandra Krunić
4. (Tunisia) Ons Jabeur
5. (Czech Republic) Lucie Hradecká
6. (Slovenia) Dalila Jakupović

=== Draw ===
==== First qualifier ====
First round
1	(New Zealand) Marina Erakovic	6	6
WC	(Russia) Marta Paigina	4	3
(Japan) Eri Hozumi	6^{5}	4
10	(Israel) Julia Glushko	7^{7}	6

Qualifying competition
1	(New Zealand) Marina Erakovic	7^{7}	6
10	(Israel) Julia Glushko	6^{1}	3

==== Second qualifier ====
First round
2	(Chinese Taipei) Chang Kai-chen	4	7^{7}	5
(Czech Republic) Barbora Krejčíková	6	6^{3}	7
WC	(Chinese Taipei) Hsieh Shu-ying	1	0
9	(Japan) Miyu Kato	6	6

Qualifying competition
(Czech Republic) Barbora Krejčíková	1	7	4
9	(Japan) Miyu Kato	6	5	6

==== Third qualifier ====
First round
3	(Serbia) Aleksandra Krunić	6	6
WC	(Chinese Taipei) Hsu Ching-wen	2	0
(Japan) Shuko Aoyama	3	6	0
12	(Switzerland) Conny Perrin	6	1	6

Qualifying competition
3	(Serbia) Aleksandra Krunić	7^{7}	6^{1}	6
12	(Switzerland) Conny Perrin	6^{3}	7^{7}	2

==== Fourth qualifier ====
First round
4	(China) Zhang Kailin	3	2
PR	(Japan) Ayumi Morita	6	6
(Japan) Akiko Omae	7^{7}	3	3
7	(Tunisia) Ons Jabeur	6^{3}	6	6

Qualifying competition
PR	(Japan) Ayumi Morita	3	0^{r}
7	(Tunisia) Ons Jabeur	6	0

==== Fifth qualifier ====
First round
5	(United Kingdom) Tara Moore	6	3	7
(Japan) Shiho Akita	4	6	5
WC	(Chinese Taipei) Chan Chin-wei	5	2
8	(Czech Republic) Lucie Hradecká	7	6

Qualifying competition
5	(United Kingdom) Tara Moore	3	4
8	(Czech Republic) Lucie Hradecká	6	6

==== Sixth qualifier ====
First round
6	(Slovenia) Dalila Jakupović	6	7^{7}
(China) Lu Jiajing	1	6^{5}
(China) Liu Chang	6	6
11	(Australia) Lizette Cabrera	4	2

Qualifying competition
6	(Slovenia) Dalila Jakupović	6	6
(China) Liu Chang	2	1
