= 2016 Taiwan Open – Singles =

Singles
- 2016 Taiwan Open

Final
- Champion: (United States) Venus Williams
- Runner-up: (Japan) Misaki Doi
- Score: 6–4, 6–2

Details
- Draw: 32
- Seeds: 8

Events
| Singles | Doubles |
- Taiwan Open

This was the first edition of the tournament.

First-seeded Venus Williams won the title, defeating Misaki Doi in the final, 6–4, 6–2. It is her only title of 2016.

== Seeds ==
1. (United States) Venus Williams (champion)
2. (Japan) Misaki Doi (final)
3. (Kazakhstan) Yulia Putintseva (semifinals)
4. (Kazakhstan) Zarina Diyas (second round)
5. (China) Zheng Saisai (second round)
6. (Chinese Taipei) Hsieh Su-wei (semifinals)
7. (Japan) Kurumi Nara (quarterfinals, withdrew)
8. (United States) Alison Riske (first round)

== Draw ==
Key

- Q = Qualifier
- WC = Wild card
- LL = Lucky loser
- Alt = Alternate
- ITF = ITF entry
- PR = Protected ranking
- SR = Special ranking
- SE = Special exempt
- JE = Junior exempt
- JR = Junior Accelerator Programme entrant
- CO = College Accelerator Programme entrant
- NG = Next Gen Accelerator Program entrant
- w/o = Walkover
- r = Retired
- d = Defaulted

=== Finals ===
Semifinals
1 | (United States) Venus Williams | 7 | 6
3 | (Kazakhstan) Yulia Putintseva | 5 | 3
6 | (Chinese Taipei) Hsieh Su-wei | 0 | 2
2 | (Japan) Misaki Doi | 6 | 6

Final
1 | (United States) Venus Williams | 6 | 6
2 | (Japan) Misaki Doi | 4 | 2

=== Top half ===
First round
1 | (United States) V Williams | 6 | 6
WC | (Chinese Taipei) P-c Lee | 3 | 2
(Poland) U Radwańska | 6 | 7^{7}
WC | (Chinese Taipei) C-w Hsu | 4 | 6^{1}
(Slovakia) K Kučová | 6 | 6^{0} | 6^{3}
(Latvia) A Sevastova | 4 | 7^{7} | 7^{7}
(Croatia) D Vekić | 4 | 7^{7} | 6
8 | (United States) A Riske | 6 | 6^{5} | 3
3 | (Kazakhstan) Y Putintseva | 6 | 6
LL | (Russia) M Melnikova | 2 | 3
Q | (France) S Reix | 6^{1} | 3
Q | (Japan) M Kato | 7^{7} | 6
(Chinese Taipei) K-c Chang | 6 | 3 | 4
(Switzerland) S Vögele | 1 | 6 | 6
Q | (Spain) L Pous Tió | 2 | 5
5 | (China) S Zheng | 6 | 7

Second round
1 | (United States) V Williams | 6 | 6
(Poland) U Radwańska | 4 | 2
(Latvia) A Sevastova | 7 | 2 | 7
(Croatia) D Vekić | 5 | 6 | 5
3 | (Kazakhstan) Y Putintseva | 6 | 5 | 6
Q | (Japan) M Kato | 4 | 7 | 0
(Switzerland) S Vögele | 6 | 6
5 | (China) S Zheng | 4 | 4

Quarterfinals
1 | (United States) V Williams | 7 | 6
(Latvia) A Sevastova | 5 | 2
3 | (Kazakhstan) Y Putintseva | 6 | 0
(Switzerland) S Vögele | 3 | 0^{r}

Semifinals
1 | (United States) V Williams | 7 | 6
3 | (Kazakhstan) Y Putintseva | 5 | 3

=== Bottom half ===
First round
6 | (Chinese Taipei) S-w Hsieh | 7^{7} | 4 | 6
Q | (Japan) A Okuno | 6^{1} | 6 | 2
(Luxembourg) M Minella | 6 | 7^{7}
(Japan) N Osaka | 2 | 6^{4}
WC | (Chinese Taipei) Y-h Lee | 6 | 4 | 4
(Russia) E Kulichkova | 3 | 6 | 6
Q | (Ukraine) L Kichenok | 7 | 1 | 2
4 | (Kazakhstan) Z Diyas | 5 | 6 | 6
7 | (Japan) K Nara | 6 | 6
(China) Q Wang | 1 | 3
LL | (Japan) H Kuwata | 7 | 6^{3} | 2
Q | (China) Y Zhang | 5 | 7^{7} | 6
(China) Y Wang | 5 | 5
(Poland) M Linette | 7 | 7
(Czech Republic) Kr Plíšková | 3 | 4
2 | (Japan) M Doi | 6 | 6

Second round
6 | (Chinese Taipei) S-w Hsieh | 6 | 4 | 6
(Luxembourg) M Minella | 4 | 6 | 2
(Russia) E Kulichkova | 7 | 0 | 6
4 | (Kazakhstan) Z Diyas | 5 | 6 | 4
7 | (Japan) K Nara | 6 | 4 | 6
Q | (China) Y Zhang | 2 | 6 | 3
(Poland) M Linette | 2 | 3
2 | (Japan) M Doi | 6 | 6

Quarterfinals
6 | (Chinese Taipei) S-w Hsieh | 6 | 6
(Russia) E Kulichkova | 0 | 2
7 | (Japan) K Nara
2 | (Japan) M Doi | w/o

Semifinals
6 | (Chinese Taipei) S-w Hsieh | 0 | 2
2 | (Japan) M Doi | 6 | 6

== Qualifying ==
=== Seeds ===
1. (Japan) Miyu Kato (qualified)
2. (Spain) Laura Pous Tió (qualified)
3. (China) Zhang Yuxuan (qualified)
4. (Japan) Hiroko Kuwata (qualifying competition, lucky loser)
5. (Russia) Marina Melnikova (qualifying competition, lucky loser)
6. (China) Liu Chang (qualifying competition)
7. (China) Xu Yifan (qualifying competition)
8. (France) Shérazad Reix (qualified)
9. (Japan) Ayaka Okuno (qualified)
10. (Bulgaria) Aleksandrina Naydenova (qualifying competition)
11. (Japan) Junri Namigata (qualifying competition)
12. (Ukraine) Lyudmyla Kichenok (qualified)

=== Qualifiers ===
1. (Japan) Miyu Kato
2. (Spain) Laura Pous Tió
3. (China) Zhang Yuxuan
4. (France) Shérazad Reix
5. (Japan) Ayaka Okuno
6. (Ukraine) Lyudmyla Kichenok

=== Lucky losers ===
1. (Japan) Hiroko Kuwata
2. (Russia) Marina Melnikova

=== Draw ===
==== First qualifier ====
| First round | | | | Qualifying competition |
| | | | | 1 | (Japan) Miyu Kato | 6 | 3 | 6 |
| | (Slovakia) Michaela Hončová | 4 | 4 | 11 | (Japan) Junri Namigata | 4 | 6 | 2 |
| 11 | (Japan) Junri Namigata | 6 | 6 |

==== Second qualifier ====
| First round | | | | Qualifying competition |
| | | | | 2 | (Spain) Laura Pous Tió | 6 | 6^{5} | 6 |
| WC | (Chinese Taipei) Chien Pei-ju | 1 | 2 | 10 | (Bulgaria) Aleksandrina Naydenova | 4 | 7^{7} | 3 |
| 10 | (Bulgaria) Aleksandrina Naydenova | 6 | 6 |

==== Third qualifier ====
| First round | | | | Qualifying competition |
| | | | | 3 | (China) Zhang Yuxuan | 6 | 6^{3} | 6 |
| WC | (Chinese Taipei) Cho I-hsuan | 1 | 1 | 7 | (China) Xu Yifan | 4 | 7^{7} | 2 |
| 7 | (China) Xu Yifan | 6 | 6 |

==== Fourth qualifier ====
| First round | | | | Qualifying competition |
| | | | | 4 | (Japan) Hiroko Kuwata | 6^{5} | 2 |
| | (United Kingdom) Emily Webley-Smith | 5 | 5 | 8 | (France) Shérazad Reix | 7^{7} | 6 |
| 8 | (France) Shérazad Reix | 7 | 7 |

==== Fifth qualifier ====
First round
5 | (Russia) Marina Melnikova | 6 | 6
WC | (Chinese Taipei) Tang Wei | 2 | 1
(Japan) Mizuno Kijima | 2 | 4
9 | (Japan) Ayaka Okuno | 6 | 6

Qualifying competition
5 | (Russia) Marina Melnikova | 2 | 6 | 3
9 | (Japan) Ayaka Okuno | 6 | 3 | 6

==== Sixth qualifier ====
First round
6 | (China) Liu Chang | 6 | 6
WC | (Chinese Taipei) Shih Hsin-yuan | 2 | 0
(United States) Tori Kinard | 7^{7} | 3 | 2
12 | (Ukraine) Lyudmyla Kichenok | 6^{2} | 6 | 6

Qualifying competition
6 | (China) Liu Chang | 6 | 4 | 2
12 | (Ukraine) Lyudmyla Kichenok | 3 | 6 | 6
