= 2017 Taiwan Open – Doubles =

Doubles
- 2017 Taiwan Open

Final
- Champions: (Chinese Taipei) Chan Hao-ching (Chinese Taipei) Chan Yung-jan
- Runners-up: (Czech Republic) Lucie Hradecká (Czech Republic) Kateřina Siniaková
- Score: 6–4, 6–2

Details
- Draw: 16
- Seeds: 4

Events
Singles	Doubles
- Taiwan Open

Chan Hao-ching and Chan Yung-jan were the defending champions and successfully defended their title, defeating Lucie Hradecká and Kateřina Siniaková in the final, 6–4, 6–2.

== Seeds ==
1. (Chinese Taipei) Chan Hao-ching / (Chinese Taipei) Chan Yung-jan (champions)
2. (Czech Republic) Lucie Hradecká / (Czech Republic) Kateřina Siniaková (final)
3. (Georgia (country)) Oksana Kalashnikova / (Serbia) Aleksandra Krunić (first round)
4. (Japan) Eri Hozumi / (Japan) Miyu Kato (quarterfinals)

== Draw ==
Key

- Q = Qualifier
- WC = Wild card
- LL = Lucky loser
- Alt = Alternate
- ITF = ITF entry
- PR = Protected ranking
- SR = Special ranking
- SE = Special exempt
- JE = Junior exempt
- JR = Junior Accelerator Programme entrant
- CO = College Accelerator Programme entrant
- NG = Next Gen Accelerator Program entrant
- w/o = Walkover
- r = Retired
- d = Defaulted

First round
1	(Chinese Taipei) H-c Chan (Chinese Taipei) Y-j Chan	6	7^{7}
WC	(Chinese Taipei) S-y Hsieh (Chinese Taipei) C-w Hsu	4	6^{5}
(Montenegro) D Kovinić (Poland) M Linette	6	4	[10]
(Japan) M Doi (Japan) K Nara	4	6	[4]
4	(Japan) E Hozumi (Japan) M Kato	3	6	[10]
(Czech Republic) B Krejčíková (Kazakhstan) G Voskoboeva	6	3	[8]
(China) C Liu (China) S Zheng	6	4	[10]
(Russia) N Dzalamidze (Luxembourg) M Minella	4	6	[4]
(Chinese Taipei) K-c Chang (Chinese Taipei) C-j Chuang	4	4
(Japan) N Hibino (China) K Zhang	6	6
WC	(Chinese Taipei) Y-h Lee (Thailand) P Plipuech	6	0	[10]
3	(Georgia (country)) O Kalashnikova (Serbia) A Krunić	4	6	[8]
(Japan) A Omae (China) L Zhu	5	2
(Chinese Taipei) C-w Chan (United States) N Melichar	7	6
(Japan) S Aoyama (Japan) M Ninomiya	4	1
2	(Czech Republic) L Hradecká (Czech Republic) K Siniaková	6	6

Quarterfinals
1	(Chinese Taipei) H-c Chan (Chinese Taipei) Y-j Chan	6	6
(Montenegro) D Kovinić (Poland) M Linette	1	4
4	(Japan) E Hozumi (Japan) M Kato	2	5
(China) C Liu (China) S Zheng	6	7
(Japan) N Hibino (China) K Zhang	2	6	[10]
WC	(Chinese Taipei) Y-h Lee (Thailand) P Plipuech	6	2	[7]
(Chinese Taipei) C-w Chan (United States) N Melichar	5	4
2	(Czech Republic) L Hradecká (Czech Republic) K Siniaková	7	6

Semifinals
1	(Chinese Taipei) H-c Chan (Chinese Taipei) Y-j Chan	6^{4}	6	[10]
(China) C Liu (China) S Zheng	7^{7}	2	[5]
(Japan) N Hibino (China) K Zhang	3	4
2	(Czech Republic) L Hradecká (Czech Republic) K Siniaková	6	6

Final
1	(Chinese Taipei) H-c Chan (Chinese Taipei) Y-j Chan	6	6
2	(Czech Republic) L Hradecká (Czech Republic) K Siniaková	4	2
