= 2016 Taiwan Open – Doubles =

Doubles
- 2016 Taiwan Open

Final
- Champion: (Chinese Taipei) Chan Hao-ching (Chinese Taipei) Chan Yung-jan
- Runner-up: (Japan) Eri Hozumi (Japan) Miyu Kato
- Score: 6–4, 6–3

Details
- Draw: 16
- Seeds: 4

Events
| Singles | Doubles |
- Taiwan Open

This was the first edition of the tournament.
Chan Hao-ching and Chan Yung-jan won the title, defeating Eri Hozumi and Miyu Kato in the final, 6–4, 6–3.

== Seeds ==
1. (Chinese Taipei) Chan Hao-ching / (Chinese Taipei) Chan Yung-jan (champions)
2. (China) Liang Chen / (China) Wang Yafan (quarterfinals)
3. (Ukraine) Lyudmyla Kichenok / (Ukraine) Nadiia Kichenok (semifinals)
4. (Japan) Shuko Aoyama / (Chinese Taipei) Chan Chin-wei (first round)

== Draw ==
Key

- Q = Qualifier
- WC = Wild card
- LL = Lucky loser
- Alt = Alternate
- ITF = ITF entry
- PR = Protected ranking
- SR = Special ranking
- SE = Special exempt
- JE = Junior exempt
- JR = Junior Accelerator Programme entrant
- CO = College Accelerator Programme entrant
- NG = Next Gen Accelerator Program entrant
- w/o = Walkover
- r = Retired
- d = Defaulted

First round
1 | (Chinese Taipei) H-c Chan (Chinese Taipei) Y-j Chan | 6 | 7^{7}
(Kazakhstan) Z Diyas (China) Y Xu | 1 | 6^{5}
WC | (Chinese Taipei) I-h Cho (Chinese Taipei) H-y Shih | 2 | 1
(Russia) M Melnikova (Luxembourg) M Minella | 6 | 6
4 | (Japan) S Aoyama (Chinese Taipei) C-w Chan | 5 | 6 | [9]
(Chinese Taipei) C-w Hsu (Chinese Taipei) Y-h Lee | 7 | 3 | [11]
(Czech Republic) Kr Plíšková (Switzerland) S Vögele | 6 | 3 | [13]
(Japan) J Namigata (United Kingdom) E Webley-Smith | 4 | 6 | [11]
(Slovakia) K Kučová (Latvia) A Sevastova | 6 | 6
(China) C Liu (Japan) A Okuno | 4 | 1
(Germany) C Daniels (Spain) L Pous Tió | 1 | 3
3 | (Ukraine) L Kichenok (Ukraine) N Kichenok | 6 | 6
WC | (Chinese Taipei) P-j Chien (Chinese Taipei) P-c Lee | 1 | 3
(Japan) E Hozumi (Japan) M Kato | 6 | 6
(Chinese Taipei) K-c Chang (Chinese Taipei) C-j Chuang | 6^{7} | 5
2 | (China) C Liang (China) Y Wang | 7^{9} | 7

Quarterfinals
1 | (Chinese Taipei) H-c Chan (Chinese Taipei) Y-j Chan | 6 | 6
(Russia) M Melnikova (Luxembourg) M Minella | 2 | 4
(Chinese Taipei) C-w Hsu (Chinese Taipei) Y-h Lee | 6 | 6
(Czech Republic) Kr Plíšková (Switzerland) S Vögele | 3 | 1
(Slovakia) K Kučová (Latvia) A Sevastova | 6^{9} | 6 | [4]
3 | (Ukraine) L Kichenok (Ukraine) N Kichenok | 7^{11} | 4 | [10]
(Japan) E Hozumi (Japan) M Kato | 6 | 7
2 | (China) C Liang (China) Y Wang | 2 | 5

Semifinals
1 | (Chinese Taipei) H-c Chan (Chinese Taipei) Y-j Chan | 6 | 6
(Chinese Taipei) C-w Hsu (Chinese Taipei) Y-h Lee | 3 | 3
3 | (Ukraine) L Kichenok (Ukraine) N Kichenok | 1 | 6 | [7]
(Japan) E Hozumi (Japan) M Kato | 6 | 2 | [10]

Final
1 | (Chinese Taipei) H-c Chan (Chinese Taipei) Y-j Chan | 6 | 6
(Japan) E Hozumi (Japan) M Kato | 4 | 3
