= 2017 Taiwan Open =

- Date: 30 January – 5 February
- Edition: 2nd
- Category: International
- Draw: 32S / 16D
- Prize money: $250,000
- Surface: Hard (i)
- Location: Taipei, Taiwan
- Venue: Taipei Arena

Champions

Singles
- (Ukraine) Elina Svitolina

Doubles
- (Chinese Taipei) Chan Hao-ching / (Chinese Taipei) Chan Yung-jan
- Taiwan Open

The 2017 Taiwan Open was a women's professional tennis tournament played on indoor hard courts. It was the second edition of the tournament and part of the WTA International category of the WTA International tournaments of the 2017 WTA Tour. The tournament was moved from Kaohsiung to Taipei starting from this year. First-seeded Elina Svitolina won the singles title.

== Finals ==
=== Singles ===
- (Ukraine) Elina Svitolina defeated (China) Peng Shuai 6–3, 6–2

=== Doubles ===
- (Chinese Taipei) Chan Hao-ching / (Chinese Taipei) Chan Yung-jan defeated (Czech Republic) Lucie Hradecká / (Czech Republic) Kateřina Siniaková, 6–4, 6–2

== Points and prize money ==
=== Point distribution ===
Event^{1}	W	F	SF	QF	Round of 16	Round of 32	Q	Q3	Q2	Q1
Singles	280	180	110	60	30	1	18	14	10	1
Doubles	280	180	110	60	1	—N/a	—N/a	—N/a	—N/a	—N/a

=== Prize money ===
Event	W	F	SF	QF	Round of 16	Round of 32^{2}	Q2	Q1
Singles	$43,000	$21,400	$11,500	$6,175	$3,400	$2,100	$1,020	$600
Doubles *	$12,300	$6,400	$3,435	$1,820	$960	—N/a	—N/a	—N/a

_{^{1} Qualifiers' prize money is also the Round of 32 prize money}
_{* per team}

== Singles main-draw entrants ==
=== Seeds ===
Country	Player	Rank^{1}	Seed
UKR	Elina Svitolina	13	1
AUS	Samantha Stosur	21	2
FRA	Caroline Garcia	24	3
LAT	Anastasija Sevastova	33	4
CZE	Kateřina Siniaková	37	5
JPN	Misaki Doi	41	6
USA	Shelby Rogers	52	7
SRB	Jelena Janković	54	8

- ^{1} Rankings as of January 16, 2017.

=== Other entrants ===
The following players received wildcards into the singles main draw:

- (Chinese Taipei) Lee Ya-hsuan
- (Czech Republic) Lucie Šafářová
- (Australia) Samantha Stosur

The following players received entry using a protected ranking:

- (Kazakhstan) Galina Voskoboeva

The following players received entry from the qualifying draw:

- (New Zealand) Marina Erakovic
- (Czech Republic) Lucie Hradecká
- (Tunisia) Ons Jabeur
- (Slovenia) Dalila Jakupović
- (Japan) Miyu Kato
- (Serbia) Aleksandra Krunić

=== Withdrawals ===
Before the tournament

- (United States) Catherine Bellis → replaced by (Japan) Risa Ozaki
- (Slovakia) Kristína Kučová → replaced by (Luxembourg) Mandy Minella
- (Germany) Sabine Lisicki → replaced by (Slovakia) Jana Čepelová
- (United States) Christina McHale → replaced by (Poland) Magda Linette
- (France) Pauline Parmentier → replaced by (Italy) Francesca Schiavone
- (United States) Alison Riske → replaced by (Japan) Nao Hibino

=== Retirements ===
- (Romania) Sorana Cîrstea (Left wrist injury)

== Doubles main-draw entrants ==
=== Seeds ===
Country	Player	Country	Player	Rank^{1}	Seed
TPE	Chan Hao-ching	TPE	Chan Yung-jan	26	1
CZE	Lucie Hradecká	CZE	Kateřina Siniaková	45	2
GEO	Oksana Kalashnikova	SRB	Aleksandra Krunić	100	3
JPN	Eri Hozumi	JPN	Miyu Kato	105	4

- ^{1} Rankings as of January 16, 2017.

=== Other entrants ===
The following pairs received wildcards into the doubles main draw:

- (Chinese Taipei) Hsieh Shu-ying / (Chinese Taipei) Hsu Ching-wen
- (Chinese Taipei) Lee Ya-hsuan / (Thailand) Peangtarn Plipuech

== See also ==
- List of sporting events in Taiwan
