= 2018 Taiwan Open – Singles =

Singles
- 2018 Taiwan Open

Final
- Champion: (Hungary) Tímea Babos
- Runner-up: (Ukraine) Kateryna Kozlova
- Score: 7–5, 6–1

Details
- Draw: 32
- Seeds: 8

Events
Singles	Doubles
- Taiwan Open

The 2018 Taiwan Open – Singles was an event of the 2018 Taiwan Open women's tennis tournament, held in Taipei, Taiwan. The draw comprised 32 players and eight of them were seeded, with Peng Shuai as the top seed. Elina Svitolina was the defending champion, but withdrew before the tournament began. Fourth-seeded Tímea Babos won the title, defeating Kateryna Kozlova in the final, 7–5, 6–1.

== Seeds ==
1. (China) Peng Shuai (first round)
2. (China) Zhang Shuai (first round)
3. (Australia) Samantha Stosur (first round)
4. (Hungary) Tímea Babos (champion)
5. (Kazakhstan) Yulia Putintseva (quarterfinals)
6. (Kazakhstan) Zarina Diyas (second round)
7. (Poland) Magda Linette (quarterfinals)
8. (France) Pauline Parmentier (second round)

== Draw ==
Key

- Q = Qualifier
- WC = Wild card
- LL = Lucky loser
- Alt = Alternate
- ITF = ITF entry
- PR = Protected ranking
- SR = Special ranking
- SE = Special exempt
- JE = Junior exempt
- JR = Junior Accelerator Programme entrant
- CO = College Accelerator Programme entrant
- NG = Next Gen Accelerator Program entrant
- w/o = Walkover
- r = Retired
- d = Defaulted

=== Finals ===
Semifinals
PR	(China) Wang Yafan	3	4
4	(Hungary) Tímea Babos	6	6
PR	(Germany) Sabine Lisicki	5	4
(Ukraine) Kateryna Kozlova	7	6

Final
4	(Hungary) Tímea Babos	7	6
(Ukraine) Kateryna Kozlova	5	1

=== Top half ===
First round
1	(China) S Peng	4	1
(Romania) A Bogdan	6	6
(China) L Zhu	6	5	0^{r}
WC	(Canada) E Bouchard	1	7	2
PR	(China) Y Wang	6	6
(Japan) R Ozaki	2	4
(Japan) K Nara	6	4	1
8	(France) P Parmentier	1	6	6
4	(Hungary) T Babos	6	6
(Australia) Ar Rodionova	3	2
Q	(Australia) L Cabrera	0	1
Q	(Slovenia) D Jakupović	6	6
LL	(China) Jin Lu	3	1
(Sweden) J Larsson	6	6
Q	(China) X Han	2	0
7	(Poland) M Linette	6	6

Second round
(Romania) A Bogdan	5	5
WC	(Canada) E Bouchard	7	7
PR	(China) Y Wang	6	6
8	(France) P Parmentier	3	3
4	(Hungary) T Babos	6	4	6
Q	(Slovenia) D Jakupović	3	6	2
(Sweden) J Larsson	1	7^{7}	6^{3}
7	(Poland) M Linette	6	6^{4}	7^{7}

Quarterfinals
WC	(Canada) E Bouchard	4	0
PR	(China) Y Wang	6	6
4	(Hungary) T Babos	6	6
7	(Poland) M Linette	1	3

Semifinals
PR	(China) Y Wang	3	4
4	(Hungary) T Babos	6	6

=== Bottom half ===
First round
6	(Kazakhstan) Z Diyas	6	7
Q	(Russia) A Blinkova	2	5
(Romania) M Niculescu	6	4
(Tunisia) O Jabeur	1	0^{r}
PR	(Germany) S Lisicki	6	1	7^{7}
Q	(China) Y Zhang	3	6	6^{3}
(Japan) N Hibino	7^{8}	6
3	(Australia) S Stosur	6^{6}	2
5	(Kazakhstan) Y Putintseva	6	6
Q	(Japan) J Namigata	2	4
WC	(Chinese Taipei) Y-h Lee	5	2
WC	(Chinese Taipei) K-c Chang	7	6
(China) Y Duan	6	4	7
(Japan) M Kato	2	6	5
(Ukraine) K Kozlova	6	6
2	(China) S Zhang	2	4

Second round
6	(Kazakhstan) Z Diyas	0	6	4
(Romania) M Niculescu	6	1	6
PR	(Germany) S Lisicki	6	6
(Japan) N Hibino	4	1
5	(Kazakhstan) Y Putintseva	6	7^{7}
WC	(Chinese Taipei) K-c Chang	3	6^{3}
(China) Y Duan	6	2	6^{4}
(Ukraine) K Kozlova	3	6	7^{7}

Quarterfinals
(Romania) M Niculescu	6	4	4
PR	(Germany) S Lisicki	4	6	6
5	(Kazakhstan) Y Putintseva	5	3
(Ukraine) K Kozlova	7	6

Semifinals
PR	(Germany) S Lisicki	5	4
(Ukraine) K Kozlova	7	6

== Qualifying ==
=== Seeds ===
1. (China) Han Xinyun (qualified)
2. (Russia) Anna Blinkova (qualified)
3. (China) Liu Fangzhou (qualifying competition)
4. (China) Lu Jingjing (qualifying competition; lucky loser)
5. (Australia) Lizette Cabrera (qualified)
6. (Japan) Eri Hozumi (first round)
7. (Slovenia) Dalila Jakupović (qualified)
8. (Japan) Junri Namigata (qualified)
9. (Australia) Priscilla Hon (qualifying competition)
10. (Thailand) Peangtarn Plipuech (qualifying competition)
11. (Japan) Ayano Shimizu (first round)
12. (India) Ankita Raina (qualifying competition)

=== Qualifiers ===
1. (China) Han Xinyun
2. (Russia) Anna Blinkova
3. (Slovenia) Dalila Jakupović
4. (China) Zhang Yuxuan
5. (Australia) Lizette Cabrera
6. (Japan) Junri Namigata

=== Lucky losers ===
1. (China) Lu Jingjing

=== Draw ===
==== First qualifier ====
First round
1	(China) Han Xinyun	6	6
WC	(Chinese Taipei) Hsieh Shu-ying	3	3
(Hong Kong) Zhang Ling	4	6	2
10	(Thailand) Peangtarn Plipuech	6	1	6

Qualifying competition
1	(China) Han Xinyun	6^{6}	6	6
10	(Thailand) Peangtarn Plipuech	7^{8}	2	2

==== Second qualifier ====
First round
2	(Russia) Anna Blinkova	6	6
WC	(Hong Kong) Ng Kwan-yau	3	2
(Sweden) Cornelia Lister	2	0
12	(India) Ankita Raina	6	6

Qualifying competition
2	(Russia) Anna Blinkova	6	6
12	(India) Ankita Raina	3	4

==== Third qualifier ====
First round
3	(China) Liu Fangzhou	6	6
(Slovakia) Michaela Hončová	3	1
(Japan) Haruka Kaji	5	2
7	(Slovenia) Dalila Jakupović	7	6

Qualifying competition
3	(China) Liu Fangzhou	6	4	3
7	(Slovenia) Dalila Jakupović	3	6	6

==== Fourth qualifier ====
First round
4	(China) Lu Jingjing	7^{7}	7
WC	(Chinese Taipei) Joanna Garland	6^{5}	5
(China) Zhang Yuxuan	6	6
11	(Japan) Ayano Shimizu	3	1

Qualifying competition
4	(China) Lu Jingjing	4	6	3
(China) Zhang Yuxuan	6	3	6

==== Fifth qualifier ====
First round
5	(Australia) Lizette Cabrera	7^{7}	7^{7}
(China) Kang Jiaqi	6^{3}	6^{2}
(Australia) Naiktha Bains	4	6	5
9	(Australia) Priscilla Hon	6	4	7

Qualifying competition
5	(Australia) Lizette Cabrera	6	6
9	(Australia) Priscilla Hon	3	2

==== Sixth qualifier ====
First round
6	(Japan) Eri Hozumi	1	6^{3}
(Japan) Hiroko Kuwata	6	7^{7}
(Chinese Taipei) Lee Pei-chi	2	3
8	(Japan) Junri Namigata	6	6

Qualifying competition
(Japan) Hiroko Kuwata	6	3	2
8	(Japan) Junri Namigata	4	6	6
