= 2016 Taiwan Open =

- Date: 8–14 February
- Edition: 1st
- Category: WTA International
- Draw: 32S / 16D
- Prize money: $500,000
- Surface: Hard
- Location: Kaohsiung, Taiwan
- Venue: Yangming Tennis Center

Champions

Singles
- (United States) Venus Williams

Doubles
- (Chinese Taipei) Chan Hao-ching / (Chinese Taipei) Chan Yung-jan
- Taiwan Open

The 2016 Taiwan Open was a women's tennis tournament played on outdoor hard courts. It was the inaugural edition of the tournament and part of the WTA International category of the 2016 WTA Tour. It took place at the Yangming Tennis Center in Kaohsiung, Taiwan from 8 February through 14 February 2016. First-seeded Venus Williams won the singles title.

== Finals ==
=== Singles ===
(United States) Venus Williams defeated (Japan) Misaki Doi 6–4, 6–2

- It was Williams' only singles title of the year and the 49th of her career.

=== Doubles ===
(Chinese Taipei) Chan Hao-ching / (Chinese Taipei) Chan Yung-jan defeated (Japan) Eri Hozumi / (Japan) Miyu Kato 6–4, 6–3

== Points and prize money ==
=== Point distribution ===
Event^{1}	W	F	SF	QF	Round of 16	Round of 32	Q	Q3	Q2	Q1
Singles	280	180	110	60	30	1	18	14	10	1
Doubles	280	180	110	60	1	—N/a	—N/a	—N/a	—N/a	—N/a

=== Prize money ===
Event	W	F	SF	QF	Round of 16	Round of 32^{2}	Q2	Q1
Singles	$111,164	$55,324	$29,730	$8,898	$4,899	$3,026	$1,470	$865
Doubles *	$17,724	$9,222	$4,950	$2,623	$1,383	—N/a	—N/a	—N/a

_{^{1} Points per the WTA.}
_{^{2} Qualifiers prize money is also the Round of 32 prize money}
_{* per team}

== Singles main-draw entrants ==
=== Seeds ===
Country	Player	Rank^{1}	Seed
USA	Venus Williams	12	1
JPN	Misaki Doi	62	2
KAZ	Yulia Putintseva	64	3
KAZ	Zarina Diyas	69	4
CHN	Zheng Saisai	71	5
TPE	Hsieh Su-wei	82	6
JPN	Kurumi Nara	90	7
USA	Alison Riske	92	8

- ^{1} Rankings as of February 1, 2016.

=== Other entrants ===
The following players received wildcards into the singles main draw:

- (Chinese Taipei) Hsu Ching-wen
- (Chinese Taipei) Lee Pei-chi
- (Chinese Taipei) Lee Ya-hsuan

The following players received entry from the qualifying draw:

- (Japan) Miyu Kato
- (Ukraine) Lyudmyla Kichenok
- (Japan) Ayaka Okuno
- (Spain) Laura Pous Tió
- (France) Shérazad Reix
- (China) Zhang Yuxuan

The following players received entry as lucky losers:

- (Japan) Hiroko Kuwata
- (Russia) Marina Melnikova

=== Withdrawals ===
Before the tournament

- (Slovakia) Jana Čepelová (Abdominal strain) → replaced by (Russia) Marina Melnikova
- (Thailand) Luksika Kumkhum → replaced by (Luxembourg) Mandy Minella
- (Switzerland) Romina Oprandi → replaced by (Slovakia) Kristína Kučová
- (France) Pauline Parmentier → replaced by (Japan) Hiroko Kuwata
- (Croatia) Ajla Tomljanović → replaced by (Japan) Naomi Osaka

During the tournament

- (Japan) Kurumi Nara (Left thigh injury)

=== Retirements ===
- (Switzerland) Stefanie Vögele (Dizziness)

== Doubles main-draw entrants ==
=== Seeds ===
Country	Player	Country	Player	Rank^{1}	Seed
TPE	Chan Hao-ching	TPE	Chan Yung-jan	21	1
CHN	Liang Chen	CHN	Wang Yafan	88	2
UKR	Lyudmyla Kichenok	UKR	Nadiia Kichenok	121	3
JPN	Shuko Aoyama	TPE	Chan Chin-wei	162	4

- ^{1} Rankings as of February 1, 2016.

=== Other entrants ===
The following pairs received wildcards into the doubles main draw:

- (Chinese Taipei) Chien Pei-ju / (Chinese Taipei) Lee Pei-chi
- (Chinese Taipei) Cho I-hsuan / (Chinese Taipei) Shih Hsin-yuan

== See also ==
- List of sporting events in Taiwan
