= 2016 Brasil Tennis Cup =

- Date: July 31 – August 5
- Edition: 4th
- Category: WTA International
- Draw: 32S / 16D
- Prize money: $250,000
- Surface: Hard
- Location: Florianópolis, Brazil
- Venue: Federação Catarinense de Tênis

Champions

Singles
- (Romania) Irina-Camelia Begu

Doubles
- (Ukraine) Lyudmyla Kichenok / (Ukraine) Nadiia Kichenok
- Brasil Tennis Cup

The 2016 Brasil Tennis Cup was a women's professional tennis tournament played on outdoor hard courts. It was the fourth edition of the Brasil Tennis Cup and part of the WTA International category of the 2016 WTA Tour. It took place in Florianópolis, Brazil from July 31 to August 5, 2016. Second-seeded Irina-Camelia Begu won the singles title.

== Finals ==
=== Singles ===
(Romania) Irina-Camelia Begu defeated (Hungary) Tímea Babos, 2–6, 6–4, 6–3

- It was Begu's only singles title of the year and the 3rd of her career.

=== Doubles ===
(Ukraine) Lyudmyla Kichenok / (Ukraine) Nadiia Kichenok defeated (Hungary) Tímea Babos / (Hungary) Réka Luca Jani, 6–3, 6–1

== Points and prize money ==
=== Point distribution ===
Event	W	F	SF	QF	Round of 16	Round of 32	Q	Q2	Q1
Singles	280	180	110	60	30	1	18	12	1
Doubles	280	180	110	60	1	—N/a	—N/a	—N/a	—N/a

=== Prize money ===
Event	W	F	SF	QF	Round of 16	Round of 32	Q2	Q1
Singles	$43,000	$21,400	$11,500	$6,175	$3,400	$2,100	$1,020	$600
Doubles	$12,300	$6,400	$3,435	$1,820	$960	—N/a	—N/a	—N/a

== Singles main draw entrants ==
=== Seeds ===
Country	Player	Rank^{1}	Seed
SRB	Jelena Janković	27	1
ROU	Irina-Camelia Begu	30	2
PUR	Monica Puig	37	3
LAT	Jeļena Ostapenko	40	4
~~KAZ~~	~~Yulia Putintseva~~	~~43~~	~~5~~
HUN	Tímea Babos	44	6
JPN	Nao Hibino	75	7
JPN	Naomi Osaka	87	8
BRA	Teliana Pereira	94	9

- Rankings are as of July 25, 2016.

=== Other entrants ===
The following players received wildcards into the singles main draw:

- (Brazil) Maria Fernanda Alves
- (Brazil) Beatriz Haddad Maia
- (Serbia) Jelena Janković

The following players received entry from the qualifying draw:

- (Paraguay) Montserrat González
- (Hungary) Réka Luca Jani
- (Ukraine) Nadiia Kichenok
- (Argentina) Nadia Podoroska
- (Russia) Valeriya Solovyeva
- (Mexico) Renata Zarazúa

The following players received entry as lucky losers:

- (Argentina) Martina Capurro Taborda
- (Ukraine) Lyudmyla Kichenok
- (Brazil) Laura Pigossi
- (United Kingdom) Emily Webley-Smith

=== Withdrawals ===
Before the tournament

- (Germany) Annika Beck → replaced by (France) Alizé Lim
- (Colombia) Mariana Duque Mariño → replaced by (Ukraine) Lyudmyla Kichenok
- (France) Caroline Garcia → replaced by (Bulgaria) Aleksandrina Naydenova
- (Chinese Taipei) Hsieh Su-wei → replaced by (Paraguay) Verónica Cepede Royg
- (Slovakia) Kristína Kučová → replaced by (Brazil) Laura Pigossi
- (Germany) Tatjana Maria → replaced by (Brazil) Paula Cristina Gonçalves
- (Romania) Monica Niculescu → replaced by (Brazil) Gabriela Cé
- (Austria) Tamira Paszek → replaced by (Ukraine) Olga Savchuk
- (Czech Republic) Kristýna Plíšková → replaced by (Russia) Anastasia Pivovarova
- (Kazakhstan) Yulia Putintseva → replaced by (United Kingdom) Emily Webley-Smith
- (Greece) Maria Sakkari → replaced by (Spain) Laura Pous Tió
- (Latvia) Anastasija Sevastova → replaced by (Romania) Ana Bogdan
- (Germany) Laura Siegemund → replaced by (Argentina) Martina Capurro Taborda
- (Ukraine) Lesia Tsurenko → replaced by (Argentina) Catalina Pella

== Doubles main draw entrants ==
=== Seeds ===
Country	Player	Country	Player	Rank^{1}	Seed
UKR	Lyudmyla Kichenok	UKR	Nadiia Kichenok	150	1
TPE	Chuang Chia-jung	LAT	Jeļena Ostapenko	163	2
HUN	Tímea Babos	HUN	Réka Luca Jani	184	3
BUL	Aleksandrina Naydenova	ESP	Laura Pous Tió	259	4

- Rankings are as of July 25, 2016.

=== Other entrants ===
The following pair received a wildcard into the doubles main draw:

- (Brazil) Carolina Alves / (Brazil) Luisa Stefani
