= 2018 Taiwan Open – Doubles =

Doubles
- 2018 Taiwan Open

Final
- Champions: (China) Duan Yingying (China) Wang Yafan
- Runners-up: (Japan) Nao Hibino (Georgia (country)) Oksana Kalashnikova
- Score: 7–6^{(7–4)}, 7–6^{(7–5)}

Details
- Draw: 16
- Seeds: 4

Events
Singles	Doubles
- Taiwan Open

Chan Hao-ching and Latisha Chan were the defending champions, but Latisha Chan chose not to participate this year. Chan Hao-ching played alongside Tímea Babos, but lost in the semifinals to Nao Hibino and Oksana Kalashnikova.

Duan Yingying and Wang Yafan won the title, defeating Hibino and Kalashnikova in the final, 7–6^{(7–4)}, 7–6^{(7–5)}.

== Seeds ==
1. (Hungary) Tímea Babos / (Chinese Taipei) Chan Hao-ching (semifinals)
2. (Japan) Miyu Kato / (Japan) Makoto Ninomiya (first round)
3. (Ukraine) Lyudmyla Kichenok / (Ukraine) Nadiia Kichenok (quarterfinals)
4. (Australia) Monique Adamczak / (Australia) Storm Sanders (first round)

== Draw ==
Key

- Q = Qualifier
- WC = Wild card
- LL = Lucky loser
- Alt = Alternate
- ITF = ITF entry
- PR = Protected ranking
- SR = Special ranking
- SE = Special exempt
- JE = Junior exempt
- JR = Junior Accelerator Programme entrant
- CO = College Accelerator Programme entrant
- NG = Next Gen Accelerator Program entrant
- w/o = Walkover
- r = Retired
- d = Defaulted

=== Draw ===
First round
1	(Hungary) T Babos (Chinese Taipei) H-c Chan	3	6	[10]
(Russia) A Blinkova (Poland) M Linette	6	0	[5]
(Japan) E Hozumi (Japan) J Namigata	6	7^{7}
WC	(Chinese Taipei) C-w Hsu (Chinese Taipei) Y-h Lee	2	6^{4}
4	(Australia) M Adamczak (Australia) S Sanders	2	2
(Sweden) C Lister (Australia) Ar Rodionova	6	6
(Kazakhstan) Z Diyas (Kazakhstan) Y Putintseva	2	1
(Japan) N Hibino (Georgia (country)) O Kalashnikova	6	6
(Chinese Taipei) K-c Chang (Chinese Taipei) C-j Chuang	2	6	[10]
(Thailand) P Plipuech (India) P Thombare	6	3	[2]
WC	(Chinese Taipei) C-w Chan (Chinese Taipei) E-s Liang	2	4
3	(Ukraine) L Kichenok (Ukraine) N Kichenok	6	6
(China) X Han (China) C Liang	0	5
PR	(China) Y Duan (China) Y Wang	6	7
(Australia) P Hon (Slovenia) D Jakupović	6	3	[10]
2	(Japan) M Kato (Japan) M Ninomiya	3	6	[7]

Quarterfinals
1	(Hungary) T Babos (Chinese Taipei) H-c Chan	6	6
(Japan) E Hozumi (Japan) J Namigata	1	4
(Sweden) C Lister (Australia) Ar Rodionova	2	2
(Japan) N Hibino (Georgia (country)) O Kalashnikova	6	6
(Chinese Taipei) K-c Chang (Chinese Taipei) C-j Chuang	2	6	[11]
3	(Ukraine) L Kichenok (Ukraine) N Kichenok	6	4	[9]
PR	(China) Y Duan (China) Y Wang	7^{7}	6
(Australia) P Hon (Slovenia) D Jakupović	6^{4}	3

Semifinals
1	(Hungary) T Babos (Chinese Taipei) H-c Chan	2	2
(Japan) N Hibino (Georgia (country)) O Kalashnikova	6	6
(Chinese Taipei) K-c Chang (Chinese Taipei) C-j Chuang	0	0
PR	(China) Y Duan (China) Y Wang	6	6

Final
(Japan) N Hibino (Georgia (country)) O Kalashnikova	6^{4}	6^{5}
PR	(China) Y Duan (China) Y Wang	7^{7}	7^{7}
