= 2016 Brasil Tennis Cup – Singles =

Singles
- 2016 Brasil Tennis Cup

Final
- Champion: (Romania) Irina-Camelia Begu
- Runner-up: (Hungary) Tímea Babos
- Score: 2–6, 6–4, 6–3

Details
- Draw: 32
- Seeds: 8

Events
Singles	Doubles
- Brasil Tennis Cup

Teliana Pereira was the defending champion, but lost in the first round to Lyudmyla Kichenok.

Irina-Camelia Begu won the title, defeating Tímea Babos in the final, 2–6, 6–4, 6–3.

== Seeds ==
1. (Serbia) Jelena Janković (second round)
2. (Romania) Irina-Camelia Begu (champion)
3. (Puerto Rico) Monica Puig (semifinals)
4. (Latvia) Jeļena Ostapenko (quarterfinals)
5. (Kazakhstan) Yulia Putintseva (withdrew)
6. (Hungary) Tímea Babos (final)
7. (Japan) Nao Hibino (quarterfinals)
8. (Japan) Naomi Osaka (quarterfinals)
9. (Brazil) Teliana Pereira (first round)

== Draw ==
Key

- Q = Qualifier
- WC = Wild card
- LL = Lucky loser
- Alt = Alternate
- ITF = ITF entry
- PR = Protected ranking
- SR = Special ranking
- SE = Special exempt
- JE = Junior exempt
- JR = Junior Accelerator Programme entrant
- CO = College Accelerator Programme entrant
- NG = Next Gen Accelerator Program entrant
- w/o = Walkover
- r = Retired
- d = Defaulted

=== Finals ===
Semifinals
(Romania) Ana Bogdan	6^{8}	3
6	(Hungary) Tímea Babos	7^{10}	6
3	(Puerto Rico) Monica Puig	3	3
2	(Romania) Irina-Camelia Begu	6	6

Final
6	(Hungary) Tímea Babos	6	4	3
2	(Romania) Irina-Camelia Begu	2	6	6

=== Top half ===
First round
1/WC	(Serbia) J Janković	7	6
Q	(Russia) V Solovyeva	5	4
(Bulgaria) A Naydenova	2	4
(Romania) A Bogdan	6	6
Q	(Hungary) RL Jani	3	2
(Czech Republic) T Martincová	6	6
LL	(Ukraine) L Kichenok	6	6
9	(Brazil) T Pereira	3	2
4	(Latvia) J Ostapenko	6	6
Q	(Ukraine) N Kichenok	4	4
(Argentina) C Pella	7	6^{5}	6
Q	(Mexico) R Zarazúa	5	7^{7}	4
(Spain) L Pous Tió	3	4
(France) A Lim	6	6
Q	(Argentina) N Podoroska	7^{7}	3	2
6	(Hungary) T Babos	6^{3}	6	6

Second round
1/WC	(Serbia) J Janković	2	5
(Romania) A Bogdan	6	7
(Czech Republic) T Martincová	6	4	6^{1}
LL	(Ukraine) L Kichenok	1	6	7^{7}
4	(Latvia) J Ostapenko	6	6
(Argentina) C Pella	2	3
(France) A Lim	0	1
6	(Hungary) T Babos	6	6

Quarterfinals
(Romania) A Bogdan	6	6
LL	(Ukraine) L Kichenok	3	3
4	(Latvia) J Ostapenko	6	3	2
6	(Hungary) T Babos	4	6	6

Semifinals
(Romania) A Bogdan	6^{8}	3
6	(Hungary) T Babos	7^{10}	6

=== Bottom half ===
First round
8	(Japan) N Osaka	6	6
(Mexico) AS Sánchez	1	1
Q	(Paraguay) M González	6	6
(Brazil) G Cé	1	4
WC	(Brazil) B Haddad Maia	7	5	0
(Ukraine) O Savchuk	5	7	6
(Russia) A Pivovarova	2	3
3	(Puerto Rico) M Puig	6	6
7	(Japan) N Hibino	6	6
LL	(United Kingdom) E Webley-Smith	3	0
(Paraguay) V Cepede Royg	6	6
WC	(Brazil) MF Alves	2	3
LL	(Argentina) M Capurro Taborda	3	1
(Brazil) PC Gonçalves	6	6
LL	(Brazil) L Pigossi	6	3	4
2	(Romania) I-C Begu	3	6	6

Second round
8	(Japan) N Osaka	6	6
Q	(Paraguay) M González	3	0
(Ukraine) O Savchuk	0	4
3	(Puerto Rico) M Puig	6	6
7	(Japan) N Hibino	6	7^{8}
(Paraguay) V Cepede Royg	3	6^{6}
(Brazil) PC Gonçalves	1	2
2	(Romania) I-C Begu	6	6

Quarterfinals
8	(Japan) N Osaka	3	4
3	(Puerto Rico) M Puig	6	6
7	(Japan) N Hibino	2	4
2	(Romania) I-C Begu	6	6

Semifinals
3	(Puerto Rico) M Puig	3	3
2	(Romania) I-C Begu	6	6

== Qualifying ==
=== Seeds ===
The top two seeds received a bye into the qualifying competition.

1. (Paraguay) Montserrat González (qualified)
2. (Hungary) Réka Luca Jani (qualified)
3. (Argentina) Nadia Podoroska (qualified)
4. (Russia) Valeriya Solovyeva (qualified)
5. (Ukraine) Lyudmyla Kichenok (qualifying competition, lucky loser)
6. (Mexico) Renata Zarazúa (qualified)
7. (Brazil) Laura Pigossi (qualifying competition, lucky loser)
8. (Ukraine) Nadiia Kichenok (qualified)
9. (France) Harmony Tan (first round)
10. (United Kingdom) Emily Webley-Smith (qualifying competition, lucky loser)
11. (Argentina) Guadalupe Pérez Rojas (first round)
12. (Brazil) Nathaly Kurata (qualifying competition)

=== Qualifiers ===
1. (Paraguay) Montserrat González
2. (Hungary) Réka Luca Jani
3. (Argentina) Nadia Podoroska
4. (Russia) Valeriya Solovyeva
5. (Ukraine) Nadiia Kichenok
6. (Mexico) Renata Zarazúa

=== Lucky losers ===
1. (Ukraine) Lyudmyla Kichenok
2. (Brazil) Laura Pigossi
3. (United Kingdom) Emily Webley-Smith
4. (Argentina) Martina Capurro Taborda

=== Draw ===
==== First qualifier ====
First round				Qualifying competition
				1	(Paraguay) Montserrat González	3	7	7
	(Argentina) Martina Capurro Taborda	7^{7}	6		(Argentina) Martina Capurro Taborda	6	5	5
9	(France) Harmony Tan	6^{5}	1

==== Second qualifier ====
First round					Qualifying competition
					2	(Hungary) Réka Luca Jani	3	6	6
	(Russia) Nika Kukharchuk	4	6	1	7	(Brazil) Laura Pigossi	6	3	1
7	(Brazil) Laura Pigossi	6	1	6

==== Third qualifier ====
First round
3	(Argentina) Nadia Podoroska	7	6
(Brazil) Carolina Alves	5	2
WC	(Brazil) Flávia Guimarães Bueno	6^{4}	2
10	(United Kingdom) Emily Webley-Smith	7^{7}	6

Qualifying competition
3	(Argentina) Nadia Podoroska	6	6
10	(United Kingdom) Emily Webley-Smith	2	2

==== Fourth qualifier ====
First round
4	(Russia) Valeriya Solovyeva	6	6
WC	(Brazil) Marcela Bueno	0	0
WC	(Brazil) Lara Teodoro de Oliveira	1	0
12	(Brazil) Nathaly Kurata	6	6

Qualifying competition
4	(Russia) Valeriya Solovyeva	6	6
12	(Brazil) Nathaly Kurata	2	1

==== Fifth qualifier ====
First round
5	(Ukraine) Lyudmyla Kichenok	6	6
WC	(Brazil) Luisa Stefani	3	2
WC	(Brazil) Nathália Rossi	1	4
8	(Ukraine) Nadiia Kichenok	6	6

Qualifying competition
5	(Ukraine) Lyudmyla Kichenok	3	2
8	(Ukraine) Nadiia Kichenok	6	6

==== Sixth qualifier ====
First round
6	(Mexico) Renata Zarazúa	6	6
(France) Fiona Codino	3	0
WC	(Brazil) Ingrid Gamarra Martins	6	6
11	(Argentina) Guadalupe Pérez Rojas	3	4

Qualifying competition
6	(Mexico) Renata Zarazúa	4	6	6
WC	(Brazil) Ingrid Gamarra Martins	6	4	4
