= 2016 Brasil Tennis Cup – Doubles =

Doubles
- 2016 Brasil Tennis Cup

Final
- Champions: (Ukraine) Lyudmyla Kichenok (Ukraine) Nadiia Kichenok
- Runners-up: (Hungary) Tímea Babos (Hungary) Réka Luca Jani
- Score: 6–3, 6–1

Details
- Draw: 14
- Seeds: 4

Events
Singles	Doubles
- Brasil Tennis Cup

Annika Beck and Laura Siegemund were the defending champions, but chose not to participate this year.

Lyudmyla and Nadiia Kichenok won the title, defeating Tímea Babos and Réka Luca Jani in the final, 6–3, 6–1.

== Seeds ==
The top two seeds received a bye into the quarterfinals.

1. (Ukraine) Lyudmyla Kichenok / (Ukraine) Nadiia Kichenok (champions)
2. (Chinese Taipei) Chuang Chia-jung / (Latvia) Jeļena Ostapenko (quarterfinals)
3. (Hungary) Tímea Babos / (Hungary) Réka Luca Jani (final)
4. (Bulgaria) Aleksandrina Naydenova / (Spain) Laura Pous Tió (first round)

== Draw ==
Key

- Q = Qualifier
- WC = Wild card
- LL = Lucky loser
- Alt = Alternate
- ITF = ITF entry
- PR = Protected ranking
- SR = Special ranking
- SE = Special exempt
- JE = Junior exempt
- JR = Junior Accelerator Programme entrant
- CO = College Accelerator Programme entrant
- NG = Next Gen Accelerator Program entrant
- w/o = Walkover
- r = Retired
- d = Defaulted

=== Bracket ===
First round
(Argentina) G Pérez Rojas (Mexico) R Zarazúa	7	6
(Brazil) PC Gonçalves (Brazil) T Pereira	5	1
4	(Bulgaria) A Naydenova (Spain) L Pous Tió	2	3
(France) A Lim (Russia) V Solovyeva	6	6
WC	(Brazil) C Alves (Brazil) L Stefani	6	0	[10]
(Japan) N Hibino (United Kingdom) E Webley-Smith	1	6	[7]
(Brazil) L Pigossi (Argentina) N Podoroska	3	4
(Paraguay) V Cepede Royg (Czech Republic) T Martincová	6	6
(Ukraine) O Savchuk (Ukraine) E Svitolina	4	2
3	(Hungary) T Babos (Hungary) RL Jani	6	6
(Paraguay) M González (Mexico) AS Sánchez	6	6
(Brazil) MF Alves (Brazil) G Cé	3	3

Quarterfinals
1	(Ukraine) L Kichenok (Ukraine) N Kichenok	6	6
(Argentina) G Pérez Rojas (Mexico) R Zarazúa	2	0
(France) A Lim (Russia) V Solovyeva	6	6
WC	(Brazil) C Alves (Brazil) L Stefani	3	4
(Paraguay) V Cepede Royg (Czech Republic) T Martincová	0	1
3	(Hungary) T Babos (Hungary) RL Jani	6	6
(Paraguay) M González (Mexico) AS Sánchez	3	6	[10]
2	(Chinese Taipei) C-j Chuang (Latvia) J Ostapenko	6	4	[4]

Semifinals
1	(Ukraine) L Kichenok (Ukraine) N Kichenok	6	7
(France) A Lim (Russia) V Solovyeva	0	5
3	(Hungary) T Babos (Hungary) RL Jani	6	6
(Paraguay) M González (Mexico) AS Sánchez	2	1

Final
1	(Ukraine) L Kichenok (Ukraine) N Kichenok	6	6
3	(Hungary) T Babos (Hungary) RL Jani	3	1
