= Kateryna Baindl =

Ukrainian tennis player (born 1994)

Kateryna Baindl Катерина Баіндль
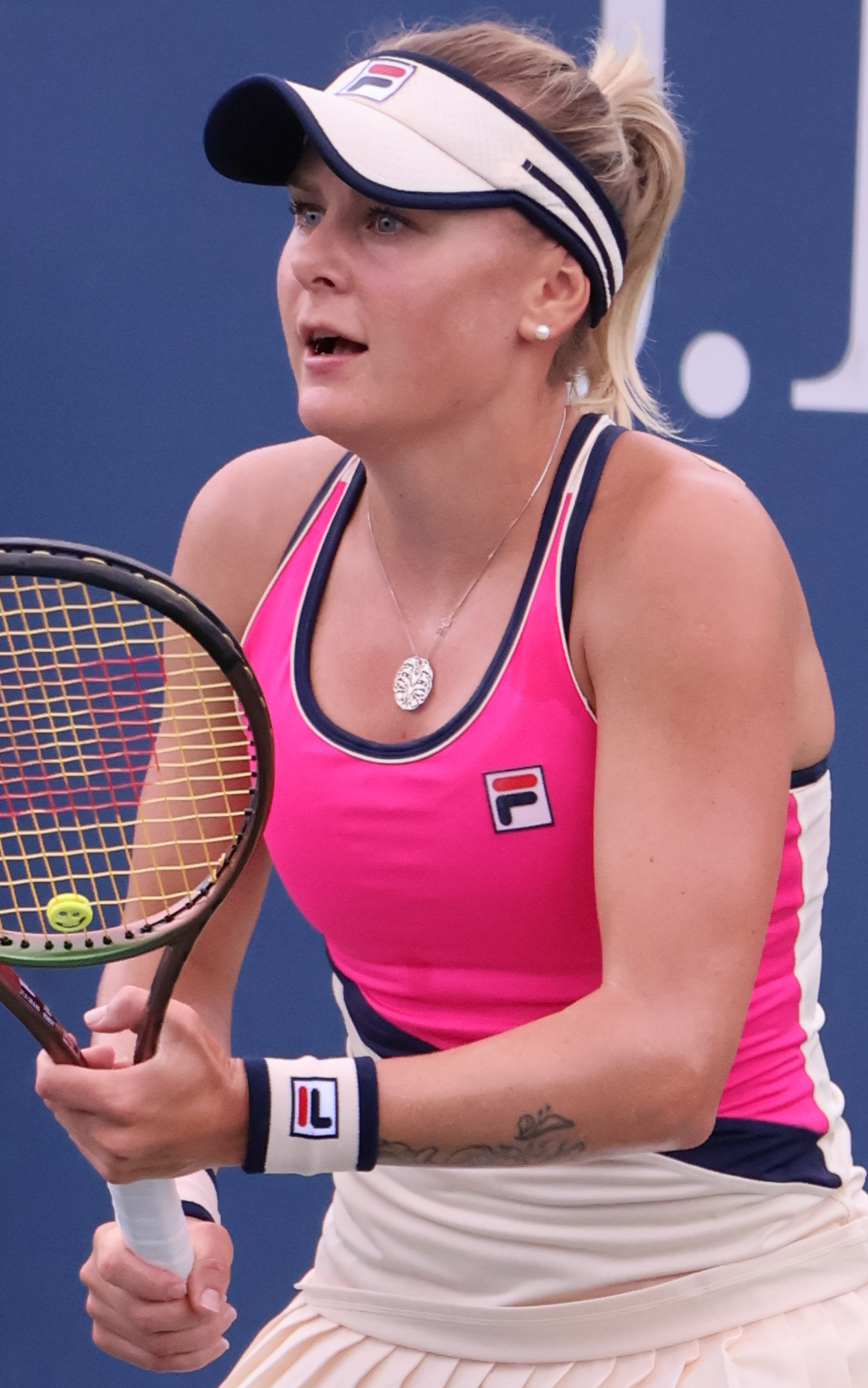
- Baindl at the 2023 US Open
- Country (sports): Ukraine
- Residence: Odesa, Ukraine
- Born: 20 February 1994 (age 32) Mykolaiv, Ukraine
- Height: 1.75 m (5 ft 9 in)
- Turned pro: 2009
- Plays: Right (two-handed backhand)
- Coach: Christopher Kas
- Prize money: $2,927,870

Singles
- Career record: 402–293
- Career titles: 1 WTA Challenger, 5 ITF
- Highest ranking: No. 62 (19 February 2018)

Grand Slam singles results
- Australian Open: 3R (2023)
- French Open: 2R (2018, 2019)
- Wimbledon: 1R (2016, 2018, 2019, 2021, 2023, 2024)
- US Open: 2R (2017, 2020)

Doubles
- Career record: 120–80
- Career titles: 13 ITF
- Highest ranking: No. 139 (22 October 2012)

Grand Slam doubles results
- Australian Open: 1R (2018)
- French Open: 2R (2020)
- Wimbledon: 2R (2023)
- US Open: 1R (2024)

Team competitions
- Fed Cup: 4–3

Kateryna Baindl (Ukrainian: Катерина Ігорівна Байндль, née Kozlova Ukrainian: Козлова; born 20 February 1994) is a Ukrainian inactive tennis player. On 19 February 2018, she achieved her career-high singles ranking of world No. 62. On 22 October 2012, she peaked at No. 139 in the WTA doubles rankings. She has won one singles title on the WTA Challenger Tour as well as five singles and 13 doubles titles on the ITF Circuit.

In 2021, she married Michael Baindl and changed from Kozlova to Kateryna Baindl as her competing name.

== Career ==
=== 2015: Suspension due to doping ===
On 27 May 2015, the International Tennis Federation announced that Kozlova has been found to have committed an anti-doping rule violation. She was found positive to a doping substance after taking a stimulant, dimethylbutylamine. Kozlova's suspension was reduced to six months starting from 15 February to 15 August 2015.

=== 2018: Top 5 win, maiden WTA Tour final ===
In February, Kozlova reached her first WTA Tour final at the 2018 Taiwan Open, defeating Sabine Lisicki in the semifinals, before losing the championship match to Timea Babos.

In May at the French Open, she became the second player to defeat a defending champion in the first round of the French Open, after a straight sets victory over 2017 champion Jeļena Ostapenko.

At the 2018 Tashkent Open Kozlova reached the semifinals but lost to Anastasia Potapova.

=== 2022: Poland Open semifinal ===
Having lost in qualifying, Baindl gained entry to the Poland Open as a lucky loser where wins over 11th seed Maryna Zanevska, qualifier Sara Errani and eighth seed Petra Martić, saw her reach the semifinals. She lost to Ana Bogdan in the last four.

At the Emilia-Romagna Open in Parma, she qualified into the main draw where she was defeated by world No. 7 and top seed, Maria Sakkari.

=== 2023–2024: Australian Open third round ===
At the 2023 Australian Open, Baindl defeated Kamilla Rakhimova and Caty McNally to reach the third round of a Grand Slam tournament for the first time in her career. She lost to 17th seed Jeļena Ostapenko.

Baindl reached her second career singles final at the 2023 Budapest Grand Prix, defeating Claire Liu in the semifinals. She lost to lucky loser Maria Timofeeva in the final.

She used a protected ranking to get into the 2024 Wimbledon Championships and the 2024 US Open, but lost in the first round at both events, in straight sets to Laura Siegemund, and to Elisabetta Cocciaretto, respectively.

== Performance timeline ==
Key
W	F	SF	QF	#R	RR	Q#	P#	DNQ	A	Z#	PO	G	S	B	NMS	NTI	P	NH

(W) winner; (F) finalist; (SF) semifinalist; (QF) quarterfinalist; (#R) rounds 4, 3, 2, 1; (RR) round-robin stage; (Q#) qualification round; (P#) preliminary round; (DNQ) did not qualify; (A) absent; (Z#) Davis/Fed Cup Zonal Group (with number indication) or (PO) play-off; (G) gold, (S) silver or (B) bronze Olympic/Paralympic medal; (NMS) not a Masters tournament; (NTI) not a Tier I tournament; (P) postponed; (NH) not held; (SR) strike rate (events won / competed); (W–L) win–loss record.
To avoid confusion and double counting, these charts are updated at the conclusion of a tournament or when the player's participation has ended.

Only main-draw results in WTA Tour, Grand Slam tournaments, Billie Jean King Cup, United Cup, Hopman Cup and Olympic Games are included in win–loss records.

=== Singles ===
Current through the 2024 WTA Tour.

Tournament	2013	2014	2015	2016	2017	2018	2019	2020	2021	2022	2023	2024	SR	W–L	Win %
Grand Slam tournaments
Australian Open	A	A	A	Q1	1R	1R	1R	1R	A	Q2	3R	A	0 / 5	2–5	29%
French Open	Q1	Q2	A	Q3	1R	2R	2R (Note: Withdrew during the tournament. Not counted as a loss.)	1R	1R	Q1	1R	Q1	0 / 6	2–5	29%
Wimbledon	Q1	Q3	A	1R	Q2	1R	1R	NH	1R	Q1	1R	1R	0 / 6	0–6	0%
US Open	Q2	Q3	1R	1R	2R	1R	1R	2R	Q1	Q2	1R	1R	0 / 8	2–8	20%
Win–Loss	0–0	0–0	0–1	0–2	1–3	1–4	1–3	1–3	0–2	0–0	2–4	0–2	0 / 25	6–24	20%
National representation
Billie Jean King Cup (Note: Formerly known as Fed Cup until 2020.)	A	A	Z1	A	A	A	Z1	A (Note: Edition is split into the two years due to COVID-19.)		A	A	A	0 / 0	3–2	60%
WTA 1000
Qatar / Dubai Open (Note: The first Premier 5 event of the year has switched back and forth between the Dubai Tennis Championships and the Qatar Ladies Open since 2009. Dubai was classified as a Premier 5 event from 2009 to 2011 before being succeeded by Doha for the 2012–2014 period. In 2015, Dubai regained its Premier 5 status while Doha was demoted to Premier status. The Premier 5 tournaments were reclassified as WTA 1000 tournaments in 2021.)	A	A	2R	A	A	A	A	A	A	A	A	A	0 / 1	1–1	50%
Indian Wells Open	A	A	1R	Q1	Q1	Q1	3R	NH	1R	A	A	A	0 / 3	2–3	40%
Miami Open	A	A	1R	Q1	Q1	A	Q2	NH	A	A	A	A	0 / 1	0–1	0%
Madrid Open	A	A	A	A	A	A	3R	NH	1R	Q1	A	A	0 / 2	2–2	50%
Italian Open	A	A	A	A	A	A	A	A	A	A	A	A	0 / 0	0–0	–
Canadian Open	A	A	A	A	A	A	Q1	NH	A	A	A	A	0 / 0	0–0	–
Cincinnati Open	A	A	A	Q1	A	A	Q1	Q1	A	A	A	A	0 / 0	0–0	–
China Open	A	A	A	A	A	A	Q2	NH			1R	A	0 / 1	0–1	0%
Pan Pacific / Wuhan Open (Note: In 2014, the Pan Pacific Open was downgraded to a Premier event and replaced by the Wuhan Open. The Premier 5 tournaments were reclassified as WTA 1000 tournaments in 2021.)	A	A	A	A	A	A	1R	NH				A	0 / 1	0–1	0%
Win–Loss	0–0	0–0	1–3	0–0	0–0	0–0	4–3	0–0	0–2	0–0	0–1	0–0	0 / 9	5–9	36%
Career statistics
	2013	2014	2015	2016	2017	2018	2019	2020	2021	2022	2023	2024	SR	W–L	Win %
Tournaments	2	3	10	11	12	15	16	6	11	5	13	4	Career total: 104		
Titles	0	0	0	0	0	0	0	0	0	0	0	0	Career total: 0		
Finals	0	0	0	0	0	1	0	0	0	0	1	0	Career total: 2		
Overall win–loss	1–2	1–3	7–10	12–11	7–12	11–15	14–17	2–6	9–11	4–5	9–13	1–4	0 / 109	78–109	42%
Year-end ranking (Note: 2009: WTA ranking–916, 2010: WTA ranking–374, 2011: WTA ranking–343, 2012: WTA ranking–192.)	204	135	165	98	86	99	89	106	142	138	99	445	$2,927,870		

=== Doubles ===
Current through the 2024 US Open.

Tournament	2012	2013	2014	2015	2016	2017	2018	2019	2020	2021	2022	2023	2024	SR	W–L	Win %
Grand Slam tournaments
Australian Open	A	A	A	A	A	A	1R	A	1R	A	A	A	A	0 / 2	0–2	0%
French Open	A	A	A	A	A	A	1R	A	2R	A	A	A	A	0 / 2	1–2	33%
Wimbledon	A	A	A	A	Q1	A	1R	2R	NH	A	A	2R	A	0 / 3	2–3	40%
US Open	A	A	A	A	A	A	1R	1R	A	A	A	A	1R	0 / 3	0–3	0%
Win–Loss	0–0	0–0	0–0	0–0	0–0	0–0	0–4	1–2	1–2	0–0	0–0	1–1	0–1	0 / 10	3–10	23%
National representation
Billie Jean King Cup	A	A	A	Z1	A	A	A	Z1	A		A	A	A	0 / 0	1–1	50%
WTA 1000
Qatar / Dubai Open	A	A	A	1R	A	A	A	A	A	A	A	A	A	0 / 1	0–1	0%
Career statistics
Tournaments	1	3	2	2	0	2	7	2	3	0	0	1	1	Career total: 24		
Overall win–loss	1–1	0–3	0–2	0–2	0–0	0–2	3–7	2–3	1–3	0–0	0–0	1–1	0–1	0 / 25	8–25	24%
Year-end ranking (Note: 2009: WTA ranking–782, 2010: WTA ranking–326, 2011: WTA ranking–243.)	141	281	227	n/a	n/a	617	237	433	282	1320	n/a	509	1493			

== WTA Tour finals ==
=== Singles: 2 (2 runner-ups) ===
Legend WTA 500 WTA 250 (Note: The WTA International tournaments were reclassified as WTA 250 tournaments in 2021.) (0–2)	Finals by surface Hard (0–1) Clay (0–1)

Result	W–L	Date	Tournament	Tier	Surface	Opponent	Score
Loss	0–1	Feb 2018	Taipei Open, Taiwan	International	Hard (i)	(Hungary) Tímea Babos	5–7, 1–6
Loss	0–2	Jul 2023	Budapest Grand Prix, Hungary	WTA 250	Clay	Maria Timofeeva	3–6, 6–3, 0–6

== WTA 125 finals ==
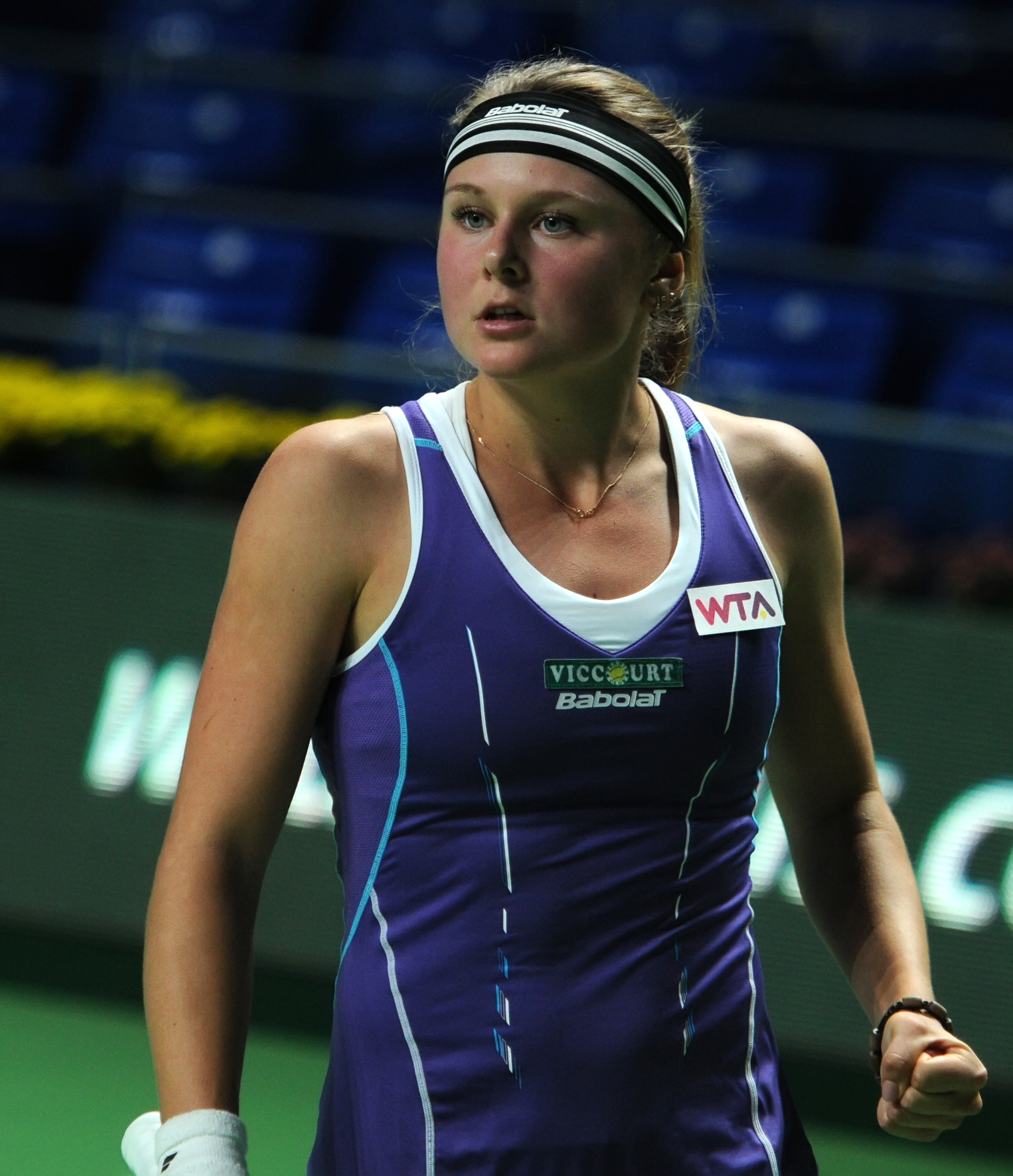
Kateryna Kozlova, 2014

=== Singles: 2 (1 title, 1 runner-up) ===
Result	W–L	Date	Tournament	Surface	Opponent	Score
Win	1–0	Sep 2017	Dalian Open, China	Hard	(Russia) Vera Zvonareva	6–4, 6–2
Loss	1–1	Nov 2022	Copa Colina, Chile	Clay	(Egypt) Mayar Sherif	6–3, 6–7^{(3)}, 5–7

== ITF Circuit finals ==
=== Singles: 11 (5 titles, 6 runner-ups) ===
Legend
$100,000 tournaments
$50/60,000 tournaments
$25,000 tournaments

Result	W–L	Date	Tournament	Tier	Surface	Opponent	Score
Win	1–0	Jul 2012	ITF Stuttgart, Germany	25,000	Clay	(Argentina) Florencia Molinero	3–6, 7–5, 6–4
Win	2–0	Aug 2012	Tatarstan Open, Russia	50,000	Hard	(United Kingdom) Tara Moore	6–3, 6–3
Win	3–0	Sep 2012	ITF Shymkent, Kazakhstan	25,000	Hard	(Kazakhstan) Anna Danilina	6–3, 4–6, 6–4
Loss	3–1	Jul 2013	ITF Istanbul, Turkey	25,000	Hard	(Russia) Elizaveta Kulichkova	3–6, 6–4, 0–6
Loss	3–2	Sep 2013	Batumi Ladies Open, Georgia	25,000	Hard	(Russia) Alexandra Panova	4–6, 6–0, 5–7
Loss	3–3	Jun 2014	Grado Tennis Cup, Italy	25,000	Clay	(Italy) Gioia Barbieri	4–6, 6–4, 4–6
Win	4–3	Jul 2014	Reinert Open Versmold, Germany	50,000	Clay	(Netherlands) Richèl Hogenkamp	6–4, 6–7^{(3)}, 6–1
Win	5–3	Jul 2017	Internazionale di Roma, Italy	60,000	Clay	(Colombia) Mariana Duque-Marino	7–6^{(6)}, 6–4
Loss	5–4	Nov 2018	Toronto Challenger, Canada	60,000	Hard (i)	(Netherlands) Quirine Lemoine	2–6, 3–6
Loss	5–5	Jul 2022	Open de Montpellier, France	W60	Clay	(Russia) Oksana Selekhmeteva	3–6, 7–5, 5–7
Loss	5–6	Oct 2022	ITF Les Franqueses del Vallès, Spain	W100	Hard	(Italy) Jasmine Paolini	4–6, 4–6

=== Doubles: 22 (13 titles, 9 runner-ups) ===
Legend
$100,000 tournaments
$50,000 tournaments
$25,000 tournaments
$10,000 tournaments

Result	W–L	Date	Tournament	Tier	Surface	Partner	Opponents	Score
Loss	0–1	May 2009	ITF Kharkiv, Ukraine	10,000	Clay	(Ukraine) Elina Svitolina	(Ukraine) Kateryna Avdiyenko (Russia) Maria Zharkova	7–6^{(3)}, 3–6, [9–11]
Loss	0–2	Oct 2009	ITF Belek, Turkey	10,000	Clay	(Ukraine) Sofiya Kovalets	(Belarus) Anna Orlik (Czech Republic) Kateřina Vaňková	3–6, 0–6
Loss	0–3	May 2010	ITF Kharkiv, Ukraine	25,000	Clay	(Ukraine) Elina Svitolina	(Ukraine) Lyudmyla Kichenok (Ukraine) Nadiia Kichenok	4–6, 2–6
Loss	0–4	Jul 2010	ITF Pozoblanco, Spain	50,000	Clay	(Ukraine) Valentyna Ivakhnenko	(Japan) Akiko Yonemura (Japan) Tomoko Yonemura	4–6, 6–3, 2–6
Win	1–4	Jul 2010	ITF Kharkiv, Ukraine	25,000	Clay	(Ukraine) Elina Svitolina	(Ukraine) Valentyna Ivakhnenko (Ukraine) Alyona Sotnikova	6–3, 7–5
Win	2–4	Jun 2011	ITF Kharkiv, Ukraine	25,000	Clay	(Ukraine) Valentyna Ivakhnenko	(Austria) Melanie Klaffner (Lithuania) Lina Stančiūtė	6–4, 6–3
Win	3–4	Jul 2011	Contrexéville Open, France	50,000	Clay	(Ukraine) Valentyna Ivakhnenko	(Japan) Erika Sema (Brazil) Roxane Vaisemberg	2–6, 7–5, [12–10]
Win	4–4	Aug 2011	ITF Moscow, Russia	25,000	Clay	(Ukraine) Valentyna Ivakhnenko	(Hungary) Vaszilisza Bulgakova (Russia) Anna Rapoport	6–3, 6–0
Loss	4–5	Mar 2012	ITF Moscow, Russia	25,000	Carpet (i)	(Ukraine) Valentyna Ivakhnenko	(Russia) Margarita Gasparyan (Russia) Anna Arina Marenko	6–3, 6–7^{(7)}, [6–10]
Win	5–5	May 2012	ITF Moscow, Russia	25,000	Clay	(Ukraine) Valentyna Ivakhnenko	(Belarus) Darya Lebesheva (Russia) Julia Valetova	6–1, 6–3
Win	6–5	May 2012	ITF Astana, Kazakhstan	25,000	Hard (i)	(Ukraine) Valentyna Ivakhnenko	(Russia) Diana Isaeva (Russia) Ksenia Kirillova	6–2, 6–0
Win	7–5	Jun 2012	ITF Qarshi, Uzbekistan	25,000	Hard	(Ukraine) Valentyna Ivakhnenko	(Ukraine) Veronika Kapshay (Serbia) Teodora Mirčić	7–5, 6–3
Loss	7–6	Jun 2012	ITF Bukhara, Uzbekistan	25,000	Hard	(Ukraine) Valentyna Ivakhnenko	(Ukraine) Lyudmyla Kichenok (Ukraine) Nadiia Kichenok	5–7, 5–7
Loss	7–7	Jul 2012	Donetsk Cup, Ukraine	50,000	Hard	(Ukraine) Valentyna Ivakhnenko	(Ukraine) Lyudmyla Kichenok (Ukraine) Nadiia Kichenok	2–6, 5–7
Win	8–7	Aug 2012	Tatarstan Open, Russia	50,000	Clay	(Ukraine) Valentyna Ivakhnenko	(Ukraine) Lyudmyla Kichenok (Ukraine) Nadiia Kichenok	6–4, 6–7^{(6)}, [10–4]
Win	9–7	Sep 2012	ITF Shymkent, Kazakhstan	25,000	Hard	(Ukraine) Valentyna Ivakhnenko	(Uzbekistan) Nigina Abduraimova (Kyrgyzstan) Ksenia Palkina	6–2, 6–4
Win	10–7	Aug 2013	Tatarstan Open, Russia	50,000	Clay	(Ukraine) Valentyna Ivakhnenko	(Turkey) Başak Eraydın (Ukraine) Veronika Kapshay	6–4, 6–1
Win	11–7	Sep 2013	Batumi Ladies Open, Georgia	25,000	Clay	(Ukraine) Valentyna Ivakhnenko	(Germany) Christina Shakovets (Ukraine) Alona Fomina	6–0, 6–4
Win	12–7	Jan 2014	Open Andrézieux-Bouthéon, France	25,000	Hard (i)	(Ukraine) Yuliya Beygelzimer	(Switzerland) Timea Bacsinszky (Germany) Kristina Barrois	6–3, 3–6, [10–8]
Loss	12–8	Feb 2014	Open de Grenoble, France	25,000	Hard (i)	(Russia) Margarita Gasparyan	(Georgia (country)) Sofia Shapatava (Ukraine) Anastasiya Vasylyeva	1–6, 4–6
Win	13–8	Feb 2014	ITF Moscow, Russia	25,000	Hard (i)	(Ukraine) Valentyna Ivakhnenko	(Russia) Veronika Kudermetova (Belarus) Sviatlana Pirazhenka	7–6^{(6)}, 6–4
Loss	13–9	Aug 2018	Vancouver Open, Canada	100,000	Hard	(Netherlands) Arantxa Rus	(United States) Desirae Krawczyk (Mexico) Giuliana Olmos	2–6, 5–7

== Wins over top-10 players ==
Season	2018	2019	Total
Wins	1	1	2

No.	Player	Rank	Event	Surface	Rd	Score	KKR
2018
1.	(Latvia) Jeļena Ostapenko	No. 5	French Open, France	Clay	1R	7–5, 6–3	No. 66
2019
2.	(Czech Republic) Karolína Plíšková	No. 5	Madrid Open, Spain	Clay	2R	7–5, 2–6, 6–4	No. 85
