= WTA Taiwan Open =

Taiwan Open

Tournament information
- Founded: 2016; 10 years ago (as WTA tournament)
- Abolished: 2018
- Editions: 3
- Location: Kaohsiung (2016); Taipei (since 2017); Taiwan
- Venue: Yangming Tennis Center (2016); Taipei Arena (2017); Taipei Heping Basketball Gymnasium (since 2018)
- Category: WTA International tournaments
- Surface: Hard - outdoors (2016); Hard - indoors (since 2017)
- Draw: 32S / 24Q / 16D
- Prize money: US$226,750 (2017)
- Website: taiwanopen.com.tw

Current champions (2018)
- Women's singles: (Hungary) Tímea Babos
- Women's doubles: (China) Duan Yingying (China) Wang Yafan

The Taiwan Open was a professional women's tennis tournament played on indoor hard courts in Taipei, Taiwan. The tournament began in 2016 and was held in Kaohsiung, Taiwan for its first year. Affiliated with the Women's Tennis Association (WTA), the Taiwan Open was an International-level tournament on the WTA Tour. The Taiwan Open was discontinued from the 2019 season, with the Hua Hin Championships replacing it on the calendar.

== Results ==
=== Singles ===
Year	Champions	Runners-up	Score
2016	(United States) Venus Williams	(Japan) Misaki Doi	6–4, 6–2
2017	(Ukraine) Elina Svitolina	(China) Peng Shuai	6–3, 6–2
2018	(Hungary) Tímea Babos	(Ukraine) Kateryna Kozlova	7–5, 6–1
2019	succeeded by Hua Hin Championships		

=== Doubles ===
Year	Champions	Runners-up	Score
2016	(Chinese Taipei) Chan Hao-ching (Chinese Taipei) Chan Yung-jan	(Japan) Eri Hozumi (Japan) Miyu Kato	6–4, 6–3
2017	(Chinese Taipei) Chan Hao-ching (2) (Chinese Taipei) Chan Yung-jan (2)	(Czech Republic) Lucie Hradecká (Czech Republic) Kateřina Siniaková	6–4, 6–2
2018	(China) Duan Yingying (China) Wang Yafan	(Japan) Nao Hibino (Georgia (country)) Oksana Kalashnikova	7–6^{(7–4)}, 7–6^{(7–5)}
2019	succeeded by Hua Hin Championships		

== See also ==
- List of sporting events in Taiwan
