= 2012 Tashkent Open – Singles =

Singles
- 2012 Tashkent Open

Final
- Champion: (Romania) Irina-Camelia Begu
- Runner-up: (Croatia) Donna Vekić
- Score: 6–4, 6–4

Details
- Draw: 32
- Seeds: 8

Events
Singles	Doubles
- Tashkent Open

Ksenia Pervak was the defending champion, but decided not to participate.

Irina-Camelia Begu won the title, defeating Donna Vekić in the final, 6–4, 6–4.

== Seeds ==
1. (Romania) Monica Niculescu (first round)
2. (Poland) Urszula Radwańska (semifinals)
3. (France) Alizé Cornet (second round)
4. (Slovakia) Magdaléna Rybáriková (first round)
5. (Romania) Alexandra Cadanțu (quarterfinals)
6. (Serbia) Bojana Jovanovski (quarterfinals)
7. (Russia) Alexandra Panova (quarterfinals)
8. (Kazakhstan) Galina Voskoboeva (quarterfinals)

== Draw ==
Key

- Q = Qualifier
- WC = Wild card
- LL = Lucky loser
- Alt = Alternate
- ITF = ITF entry
- PR = Protected ranking
- SR = Special ranking
- SE = Special exempt
- JE = Junior exempt
- JR = Junior Accelerator Programme entrant
- CO = College Accelerator Programme entrant
- NG = Next Gen Accelerator Program entrant
- w/o = Walkover
- r = Retired
- d = Defaulted

=== Finals ===
Semifinals
(Czech Republic) Eva Birnerová	1	6	1
Q	(Croatia) Donna Vekić	6	3	6
(Romania) Irina-Camelia Begu	6	6
2	(Poland) Urszula Radwańska	3	3

Final
Q	(Croatia) Donna Vekić	4	4
(Romania) Irina-Camelia Begu	6	6

=== Top half ===
First round
1	(Romania) M Niculescu	6	3	5
(Italy) K Knapp	2	6	7
(Czech Republic) E Birnerová	7^{7}	6
(France) C Feuerstein	6^{4}	4
WC	(Uzbekistan) V Ekshibarova	4	5
WC	(Uzbekistan) S Sharipova	6	7
Q	(Russia) E Bychkova	6	4	5
5	(Romania) A Cadanțu	3	6	7
4	(Slovakia) M Rybáriková	6^{3}	3
Q	(Croatia) D Vekić	7^{7}	6
(Spain) L Arruabarrena Vecino	6	6
(Slovakia) J Čepelová	1	2
LL	(Puerto Rico) M Puig	4	2
(Greece) E Daniilidou	6	6
(Germany) D Pfizenmaier	2	6	4
6	(Serbia) B Jovanovski	6	2	6

Second round
(Italy) K Knapp	2	2
(Czech Republic) E Birnerová	6	6
WC	(Uzbekistan) S Sharipova	6	3	3
5	(Romania) A Cadanțu	1	6	6
Q	(Croatia) D Vekić	6	6
(Spain) L Arruabarrena Vecino	2	2
(Greece) E Daniilidou	3	7^{10}	3
6	(Serbia) B Jovanovski	6	6^{8}	6

Quarterfinals
(Czech Republic) E Birnerová	6	4	6
5	(Romania) A Cadanțu	3	6	2
Q	(Croatia) D Vekić	6	6
6	(Serbia) B Jovanovski	4	4

Semifinals
(Czech Republic) E Birnerová	1	6	1
Q	(Croatia) D Vekić	6	3	6

=== Bottom half ===
First round
8	(Kazakhstan) G Voskoboeva	3	6	6
Q	(Serbia) V Dolonc	6	1	0
(Ukraine) L Tsurenko	4	3
Q	(Russia) A Chakvetadze	6	6
(Romania) I-C Begu	6	6
(Uzbekistan) A Amanmuradova	4	3
(Russia) N Bratchikova	1	3
3	(France) A Cornet	6	6
7	(Russia) A Panova	4	6	7
(Australia) J Gajdošová	6	2	5
(United States) J Cohen	3	0
(Japan) M Doi	6	6
WC	(Uzbekistan) N Abduraimova	2	4
(Russia) V Diatchenko	6	6
(Spain) MT Torró Flor	4	5
2	(Poland) U Radwańska	6	7

Second round
8	(Kazakhstan) G Voskoboeva	6	6
Q	(Russia) A Chakvetadze	1	3
(Romania) I-C Begu	6	6
3	(France) A Cornet	4	1
7	(Russia) A Panova	6	6
(Japan) M Doi	4	4
(Russia) V Diatchenko	2	2
2	(Poland) U Radwańska	6	6

Quarterfinals
8	(Kazakhstan) G Voskoboeva	6	6^{1}	5
(Romania) I-C Begu	3	7^{7}	7
7	(Russia) A Panova	7	2	6^{3}
2	(Poland) U Radwańska	5	6	7^{7}

Semifinals
(Romania) I-C Begu	6	6
2	(Poland) U Radwańska	3	3

== Qualifying draw ==
=== Seeds ===
1. (Russia) Olga Puchkova (second round)
2. (Russia) Alla Kudryavtseva (second round)
3. (Netherlands) Bibiane Schoofs (second round)
4. (Puerto Rico) Monica Puig (qualifying competition, lucky loser)
5. (Russia) Marta Sirotkina (qualifying competition)
6. (Thailand) Noppawan Lertcheewakarn (first round)
7. (Turkey) Çağla Büyükakçay (qualifying competition)
8. (Russia) Ekaterina Bychkova (qualified)

=== Qualifiers ===
1. (Russia) Ekaterina Bychkova
2. (Russia) Anna Chakvetadze
3. (Serbia) Vesna Dolonc
4. (Croatia) Donna Vekić

=== Lucky loser ===
1. (Puerto Rico) Monica Puig

=== Draw ===
==== First qualifier ====
First round
1	(Russia) Olga Puchkova	6	6
(Russia) Daria Gavrilova	1	4
(Belarus) Polina Pekhova	6	6
(Russia) Valeriya Solovyeva	4	4
WC	(Russia) Mayya Katsitadze	7^{7}	6
(Russia) Ekaterina Yashina	6^{4}	4
(Poland) Paula Kania	7	6^{4}	2
8	(Russia) Ekaterina Bychkova	5	7^{7}	6

Second round
1	(Russia) Olga Puchkova	6	6^{4}	5
(Belarus) Polina Pekhova	4	7^{7}	7
WC	(Russia) Mayya Katsitadze	5	5
8	(Russia) Ekaterina Bychkova	7	7

Qualifying competition
(Belarus) Polina Pekhova	4	6	2
8	(Russia) Ekaterina Bychkova	6	3	6

==== Second qualifier ====
First round
2	(Russia) Alla Kudryavtseva	6	6
(Ukraine) Kateryna Kozlova	1	2
(Russia) Anna Chakvetadze	6	6
(Ukraine) Irina Buryachok	1	0
(Ukraine) Lyudmyla Kichenok	3	6^{5}
(Ukraine) Valentyna Ivakhnenko	6	7^{7}
WC	(Uzbekistan) Alina Abdurakhimova	1	0
7	(Turkey) Çağla Büyükakçay	6	6

Second round
2	(Russia) Alla Kudryavtseva	4	1
(Russia) Anna Chakvetadze	6	6
(Ukraine) Valentyna Ivakhnenko	1	3
7	(Turkey) Çağla Büyükakçay	6	6

Qualifying competition
(Russia) Anna Chakvetadze	6	6^{2}	6
7	(Turkey) Çağla Büyükakçay	1	7^{7}	1

==== Third qualifier ====
First round
3	(Netherlands) Bibiane Schoofs	6	4	6
(Russia) Ksenia Lykina	4	6	2
(Serbia) Vesna Dolonc	6	6
WC	(Uzbekistan) Arina Folts	1	0
(Kyrgyzstan) Ksenia Palkina	4	3
(Georgia (country)) Sofia Shapatava	6	6
(Georgia (country)) Oksana Kalashnikova	6	4	4
5	(Russia) Marta Sirotkina	1	6	6

Second round
3	(Netherlands) Bibiane Schoofs	1	6	4
(Serbia) Vesna Dolonc	6	4	6
(Georgia (country)) Sofia Shapatava	6^{0}	3
5	(Russia) Marta Sirotkina	7^{7}	6

Qualifying competition
(Serbia) Vesna Dolonc	6	6
5	(Russia) Marta Sirotkina	2	2

==== Fourth qualifier ====
First round
4	(Puerto Rico) Monica Puig	6	6
(Romania) Mădălina Gojnea	0	2
(Russia) Margarita Gasparyan	6	0
WC	(Uzbekistan) Polina Merenkova	1	0^{r}
(Ukraine) Nadiia Kichenok	3	3
(Croatia) Donna Vekić	6	6
(Russia) Alexandra Artamonova	7	6
6	(Thailand) Noppawan Lertcheewakarn	5	4

Second round
4	(Puerto Rico) Monica Puig	6	6
(Russia) Margarita Gasparyan	4	3
(Croatia) Donna Vekić	6	6
(Russia) Alexandra Artamonova	2	3

Qualifying competition
4	(Puerto Rico) Monica Puig	2	3
(Croatia) Donna Vekić	6	6
