= 2012 Tashkent Open =

- Date: September 10–16
- Edition: 14th
- Category: WTA International
- Draw: 32S / 16D
- Prize money: $220,000
- Surface: Hard
- Location: Tashkent, Uzbekistan

Champions

Singles
- (Romania) Irina-Camelia Begu

Doubles
- (Poland) Paula Kania / (Belarus) Polina Pekhova
| ← 2011 · | Tashkent Open | · 2013 → |

The 2012 Tashkent Open was a women's tennis tournament played on outdoor hard courts. It was the 14th edition of the Tashkent Open, and was part of the WTA International tournaments of the 2012 WTA Tour. It took place at the Tashkent Tennis Center in Tashkent, Uzbekistan, from September 10 through September 16, 2012. Unseeded Irina-Camelia Begu won the singles title.

== Finals ==
=== Singles ===
(Romania) Irina-Camelia Begu defeated (Croatia) Donna Vekić, 6–4, 6–4

- It was Begu's only singles title of the year and the 1st of her career.

=== Doubles ===
(Poland) Paula Kania / (Belarus) Polina Pekhova defeated (Russia) Anna Chakvetadze / (Serbia) Vesna Dolonc, 6–2, ret.

== Singles main-draw entrants ==
| Country | Player | Rank^{1} | Seed |
|---|---|---|---|
| ROU | Monica Niculescu | 33 | 1 |
| POL | Urszula Radwańska | 43 | 2 |
| FRA | Alizé Cornet | 50 | 3 |
| SVK | Magdaléna Rybáriková | 66 | 4 |
| ROU | Alexandra Cadanțu | 68 | 5 |
| SRB | Bojana Jovanovski | 72 | 6 |
| RUS | Alexandra Panova | 76 | 7 |
| KAZ | Galina Voskoboeva | 80 | 8 |

- ^{1} Rankings are as of August 27, 2012

=== Other entrants ===
The following players received wildcards into the singles main draw:

- (Uzbekistan) Nigina Abduraimova
- (Uzbekistan) Vlada Ekshibarova
- (Uzbekistan) Sabina Sharipova

The following players received entry from the qualifying draw:

- (Russia) Ekaterina Bychkova
- (Russia) Anna Chakvetadze
- (Serbia) Vesna Dolonc
- (Croatia) Donna Vekić

The following player received entry as a lucky loser:

- (Puerto Rico) Monica Puig

=== Withdrawals ===
- (Ukraine) Kateryna Bondarenko
- (France) Stéphanie Foretz Gacon
- (Slovenia) Polona Hercog
- (Israel) Shahar Pe'er
- (Kazakhstan) Ksenia Pervak

== Doubles main-draw entrants ==
=== Seeds ===
| Country | Player | Country | Player | Rank^{1} | Seed |
|---|---|---|---|---|---|
| ROU | Irina-Camelia Begu | ROU | Monica Niculescu | 65 | 1 |
| RUS | Nina Bratchikova | RUS | Alexandra Panova | 135 | 2 |
| CZE | Eva Birnerová | GRE | Eleni Daniilidou | 138 | 3 |
| FRA | Alizé Cornet | RUS | Alla Kudryavtseva | 149 | 4 |

- ^{1} Rankings are as of August 27, 2012

=== Other entrants ===
The following pairs received wildcards into the doubles main draw:

- (Uzbekistan) Nigina Abduraimova / (Russia) Ksenia Lykina
- (Russia) Daria Gavrilova / (Uzbekistan) Sabina Sharipova

=== Retirements ===
- (Russia) Anna Chakvetadze (back injury)
