= 2011 Tashkent Open – Doubles =

Doubles
- 2011 Tashkent Open

Final
- Champions: (Greece) Eleni Daniilidou (Russia) Vitalia Diatchenko
- Runners-up: (Ukraine) Lyudmyla Kichenok (Ukraine) Nadiya Kichenok
- Score: 6–4, 6–3

Details
- Draw: 16
- Seeds: 4

Events
Singles	Doubles
← 2010 ·	Tashkent Open	· 2012 →

Alexandra Panova and Tatiana Poutchek were the defending champions, but Poutchek decided not to participate.
Panova partnered with Akgul Amanmuradova, but were eliminated in the semifinals by Eleni Daniilidou and Vitalia Diatchenko.
Daniilidou and Diatchenko later defeated Lyudmyla Kichenok and Nadiya Kichenok in the final, 6–4, 6–3.

== Seeds ==
1. (Belarus) Olga Govortsova / (Russia) Alla Kudryavtseva
  (withdrew due to Govortsova's right elbow injury)
2. (Greece) Eleni Daniilidou / (Russia) Vitalia Diatchenko (champions)
3. (Uzbekistan) Akgul Amanmuradova / (Russia) Alexandra Panova (semifinals)
4. (Romania) Sorana Cîrstea / (France) Pauline Parmentier (first round)

== Draw ==
=== Key ===
- Q = Qualifier
- WC = Wild card
- LL = Lucky loser
- Alt = Alternate
- SE = Special exempt
- PR = Protected ranking
- ITF = ITF entry
- JE = Junior exempt
- w/o = Walkover
- r = Retired
- d = Defaulted
- SR = Special ranking

=== Draw ===
First round
Alt	(Serbia) A Krunić (Slovakia) M Rybáriková	4	5
(Ukraine) L Kichenok (Ukraine) N Kichenok	6	7
(Greece) E Georgatou (Russia) M Sirotkina	2	1
(Czech Republic) E Birnerová (Russia) V Dolonts	6	6
4	(Romania) S Cîrstea (France) P Parmentier	2	6	[8]
(France) I Brémond (Luxembourg) M Minella	6	2	[10]
(Russia) M Shamayko (Georgia (country)) S Shapatava	3	1
(Poland) U Radwańska (Russia) E Rodina	6	6
(Russia) K Pervak (Ukraine) L Tsurenko	6	2	[10]
(Bosnia and Herzegovina) M Jugić-Salkić (Finland) E Laine	3	6	[5]
Alt	(Azerbaijan) K Farhad (Georgia (country)) E Gorgodze	2	1
3	(Uzbekistan) A Amanmuradova (Russia) A Panova	6	6
WC	(Uzbekistan) S Sharipova (Russia) E Yashina	6	5	[7]
WC	(Uzbekistan) N Abduraimova (Belarus) P Pekhova	3	7	[10]
(Ukraine) T Arefyeva (Ukraine) M Koryttseva	4	4
2	(Greece) E Daniilidou (Russia) V Diatchenko	6	6

Quarterfinals
(Ukraine) L Kichenok (Ukraine) N Kichenok	1	6	[10]
(Czech Republic) E Birnerová (Russia) V Dolonts	6	2	[7]
(France) I Brémond (Luxembourg) M Minella	3	6^{3}
(Poland) U Radwańska (Russia) E Rodina	6	7^{7}
(Russia) K Pervak (Ukraine) L Tsurenko	7	5	[9]
3	(Uzbekistan) A Amanmuradova (Russia) A Panova	5	7	[11]
WC	(Uzbekistan) N Abduraimova (Belarus) P Pekhova	1	2
2	(Greece) E Daniilidou (Russia) V Diatchenko	6	6

Semifinals
(Ukraine) L Kichenok (Ukraine) N Kichenok	5	6	[10]
(Poland) U Radwańska (Russia) E Rodina	7	0	[8]
3	(Uzbekistan) A Amanmuradova (Russia) A Panova	6	1	[7]
2	(Greece) E Daniilidou (Russia) V Diatchenko	3	6	[10]

Final
(Ukraine) L Kichenok (Ukraine) N Kichenok	4	3
2	(Greece) E Daniilidou (Russia) V Diatchenko	6	6
