= 2014 Fergana Challenger – Women's singles =

Women's singles
- 2014 Fergana Challenger

Final
- Champion: (Uzbekistan) Nigina Abduraimova
- Runner-up: (Japan) Nao Hibino
- Score: 6–3, 6–4

Events
Singles	men	women
Doubles	men	women
- Fergana Challenger

Nigina Abduraimova was the defending champion, having won the event in 2013. She successfully defended her title by defeating Nao Hibino in the final, 6–3, 6–4

== Seeds ==
1. (Uzbekistan) Nigina Abduraimova (champion)
2. (Japan) Nao Hibino (final)
3. (Japan) Hiroko Kuwata (semifinals)
4. (India) Ankita Raina (second round)
5. (Kazakhstan) Kamila Kerimbayeva (quarterfinals)
6. (Japan) Mari Tanaka (second round)
7. (Uzbekistan) Sabina Sharipova (quarterfinals)
8. (India) Prarthana Thombare (first round)

== Main draw ==
Key

- Q = Qualifier
- WC = Wild card
- LL = Lucky loser
- Alt = Alternate
- ITF = ITF entry
- PR = Protected ranking
- SR = Special ranking
- SE = Special exempt
- JE = Junior exempt
- JR = Junior Accelerator Programme entrant
- CO = College Accelerator Programme entrant
- NG = Next Gen Accelerator Program entrant
- w/o = Walkover
- r = Retired
- d = Defaulted

=== Finals ===
Semifinals
1	(Uzbekistan) Nigina Abduraimova	6	6
(Montenegro) Ana Veselinović	4	4
3	(Japan) Hiroko Kuwata	1	6	6^{5}
2	(Japan) Nao Hibino	6	2	7^{7}

Final
1	(Uzbekistan) Nigina Abduraimova	6	6
2	(Japan) Nao Hibino	3	4

=== Top half ===
First round
1	(Uzbekistan) N Abduraimova	6	6
(Uzbekistan) A Khabibulina	0	0
Q	(Ukraine) A Tymofeyeva	4	2
WC	(Uzbekistan) P Merenkova	6	6
(India) R Sunkara	3	1
(Georgia (country)) E Gorgodze	6	6
LL	(Uzbekistan) A Abdurakhimova	0	0
7	(Uzbekistan) S Sharipova	6	6
4	(India) A Raina	6	4	6
(Russia) E Yashina	3	6	1
(Uzbekistan) V Ekshibarova	6	4	3
(Montenegro) A Veselinović	1	6	6
Q	(Ukraine) K Malikova	6	6
Q	(Uzbekistan) A Mukhametshina	3	4
WC	(Uzbekistan) S Khatamova	3	3
5/Q	(Kazakhstan) K Kerimbayeva	6	6

Second round
1	(Uzbekistan) N Abduraimova	6	6
WC	(Uzbekistan) P Merenkova	1	2
(Georgia (country)) E Gorgodze	3	3
7	(Uzbekistan) S Sharipova	6	6
4	(India) A Raina	2	1
(Montenegro) A Veselinović	6	6
Q	(Ukraine) K Malikova	4	7^{7}	6^{3}
5/Q	(Kazakhstan) K Kerimbayeva	6	6^{2}	7^{7}

Quarterfinals
1	(Uzbekistan) N Abduraimova	6	5	6
7	(Uzbekistan) S Sharipova	1	7	4
(Montenegro) A Veselinović	6	7^{8}
5/Q	(Kazakhstan) K Kerimbayeva	0	6^{6}

Semifinals
1	(Uzbekistan) N Abduraimova	6	6
(Montenegro) A Veselinović	4	4

=== Bottom half ===
First round
6	(Japan) M Tanaka	6	4
(Georgia (country)) S Kvatsabaia	1	1^{r}
(Japan) Y Miyazaki	6	7^{7}
Q	(Uzbekistan) K Umarova	2	6^{4}
(Uzbekistan) A Folts	6	6
(Kazakhstan) A Danilina	4	3
WC	(Uzbekistan) S Saidhujaeva	1	1
3	(Japan) H Kuwata	6	6
8	(India) P Thombare	3	4
(Russia) M Lazareva	6	6
Q	(Uzbekistan) G Yusupova	6	6
Q	(Uzbekistan) G Mukhammadsidikova	2	1
(China) X Wang	2	2
(India) S Baluu	6	6
Q	(Russia) V Kuznetsova	1	2
2	(Japan) N Hibino	6	6

Second round
6	(Japan) M Tanaka	6	3	4
(Japan) Y Miyazaki	2	6	6
(Uzbekistan) A Folts	0	1
3	(Japan) H Kuwata	6	6
(Russia) M Lazareva	6	7
Q	(Uzbekistan) G Yusupova	1	5
(India) S Baluu	6^{3}	4
2	(Japan) N Hibino	7^{7}	6

Quarterfinals
(Japan) Y Miyazaki	0	6	0
3	(Japan) H Kuwata	6	2	6
(Russia) M Lazareva	6	1	1
2	(Japan) N Hibino	4	6	6

Semifinals
3	(Japan) H Kuwata	1	6	6^{5}
2	(Japan) N Hibino	6	2	7^{7}
