= 2010 Tashkent Open – Singles =

Singles
- 2010 Tashkent Open

Final
- Champion: (Russia) Alla Kudryavtseva
- Runner-up: (Russia) Elena Vesnina
- Score: 6–4, 6–4

Details
- Draw: 32
- Seeds: 8

Events
Singles	Doubles
- Tashkent Open

Shahar Pe'er was the defending champion, but chose not to participate that year.
Alla Kudryavtseva won in the final, 6–4, 6–4, against Elena Vesnina.

== Seeds ==
1. (Romania) Alexandra Dulgheru (quarterfinals)
2. (Uzbekistan) Akgul Amanmuradova (quarterfinals)
3. (Russia) Anna Chakvetadze (second round, retired due to viral disease)
4. (Russia) Elena Vesnina (final)
5. (Romania) Monica Niculescu (semifinals)
6. (Slovakia) Magdaléna Rybáriková (second round)
7. (Russia) Alla Kudryavtseva (champion)
8. (Italy) Maria Elena Camerin (second round)

== Main draw ==
Key

- Q = Qualifier
- WC = Wild card
- LL = Lucky loser
- Alt = Alternate
- ITF = ITF entry
- PR = Protected ranking
- SR = Special ranking
- SE = Special exempt
- JE = Junior exempt
- JR = Junior Accelerator Programme entrant
- CO = College Accelerator Programme entrant
- NG = Next Gen Accelerator Program entrant
- w/o = Walkover
- r = Retired
- d = Defaulted

=== Finals ===
Semifinals
5	(Romania) Monica Niculescu	3	6	4
4	(Russia) Elena Vesnina	6	3	6
(Russia) Evgeniya Rodina	1	6	3
7	(Russia) Alla Kudryavtseva	6	3	6

Final
4	(Russia) Elena Vesnina	4	4
7	(Russia) Alla Kudryavtseva	6	6

=== Top half ===
First round
1	(Romania) A Dulgheru	6	7
(Japan) K Nara	2	5
(Russia) E Bychkova	6	4	7
(India) S Mirza	1	6	5
(United Kingdom) K O'Brien	5	1
(Russia) E Ivanova	7	6
Q	(Kazakhstan) Z Diyas	3	7	2
5	(Romania) M Niculescu	6	6^{2}	6
4	(Russia) E Vesnina	6	6
(Ukraine) L Tsurenko	3	2
(Ukraine) O Savchuk	6	6
Q	(Russia) N Guskova	2	2
WC	(Uzbekistan) N Abduraimova	7	3	3
(Belarus) D Kustova	5	6	6
WC	(Uzbekistan) S Sharipova	3	3
6	(Slovakia) M Rybáriková	6	6

Second round
1	(Romania) A Dulgheru	4	6	7
(Russia) E Bychkova	6	1	5
(Russia) E Ivanova	6	0	1
5	(Romania) M Niculescu	0	6	6
4	(Russia) E Vesnina	6	6
(Ukraine) O Savchuk	2	2
(Belarus) D Kustova	6	4	6
6	(Slovakia) M Rybáriková	2	6	3

Quarterfinals
1	(Romania) A Dulgheru	6^{5}	6	3
5	(Romania) M Niculescu	7	2	6
4	(Russia) E Vesnina	6	6
(Belarus) D Kustova	0	1

Semifinals
5	(Romania) M Niculescu	3	6	4
4	(Russia) E Vesnina	6	3	6

=== Bottom half ===
First round
8	(Italy) ME Camerin	6	3	6
(Russia) E Bovina	0	6	4
WC	(Uzbekistan) A Abdurakhimova	3	1
(Switzerland) S Vögele	6	6
(Russia) E Rodina	7	6
(Russia) A Rodionova	6^{3}	3
(Slovakia) Z Kučová	3	5
3	(Russia) A Chakvetadze	6	7
7	(Russia) A Kudryavtseva	6	6
Q	(Ukraine) Y Fedak	4	1
(Russia) A Panova	6	6
(Russia) N Bratchikova	4	4
(United States) J Craybas	6	6
LL	(Kyrgyzstan) K Palkina	2	3
Q	(Greece) E Georgatou	4	3
2	(Uzbekistan) A Amanmuradova	6	6

Second round
8	(Italy) ME Camerin	4	1
(Switzerland) S Vögele	6	6
(Russia) E Rodina	7	3
3	(Russia) A Chakvetadze	6^{4}	2	r
7	(Russia) A Kudryavtseva	6	6
(Russia) A Panova	4	2
(United States) J Craybas	5	7	2
2	(Uzbekistan) A Amanmuradova	7	6^{6}	6

Quarterfinals
(Switzerland) S Vögele	4	6	0
(Russia) E Rodina	6	4	6
7	(Russia) A Kudryavtseva	7	6
2	(Uzbekistan) A Amanmuradova	6^{5}	3

Semifinals
(Russia) E Rodina	1	6	3
7	(Russia) A Kudryavtseva	6	3	6
