= 2014 Fergana Challenger =

Professional tennis tournament in Uzbekistan

- Date: 9–15 June
- Edition: 15th (men); 4th (women)
- Prize money: $50,000 (men) $25,000 (women)
- Surface: Hard
- Location: Fergana, Uzbekistan

Champions

Men's singles
- (Slovenia) Blaž Kavčič

Women's singles
- (Uzbekistan) Nigina Abduraimova

Men's doubles
- (Belarus) Sergey Betov / (Belarus) Alexander Bury

Women's doubles
- (Japan) Hiroko Kuwata / (Japan) Mari Tanaka
- Fergana Challenger

The 2014 Fergana Challenger was a professional tennis tournament played on hard courts. It was the 15th edition of the tournament for men which was part of the 2014 ATP Challenger Tour, offering a total of $50,000 in prize money, and the fourth edition of the event for women on the 2014 ITF Women's Circuit, offering a total of $25,000 in prize money. It took place in Fergana, Uzbekistan, on 9–15 June 2014.

== Men's singles main draw entrants ==
=== Seeds ===
Country	Player	Rank^{1}	Seed
SLO	Blaž Kavčič	120	1
RUS	Alexander Kudryavtsev	187	2
GEO	Nikoloz Basilashvili	209	3
UKR	Denys Molchanov	265	4
RUS	Valery Rudnev	269	5
BLR	Egor Gerasimov	283	6
JPN	Shuichi Sekiguchi	284	7
RUS	Alexander Lobkov	296	8

- ^{1} Rankings as of 26 May 2014

=== Other entrants ===
The following players received wildcards into the singles main draw:

- (Uzbekistan) Rasul Akhmadaliev
- (Uzbekistan) Djurabeck Karimov
- (Uzbekistan) Rizo Saidkhodjaev
- (Uzbekistan) Khumoun Sultanov

The following players entered as an alternate into the singles main draw:

- (Belarus) Artur Dubinski
- (Uzbekistan) Sarvar Ikramov
- (Uzbekistan) Batyr Sapaev
- (Uzbekistan) Shonigmatjon Shofayziyev

The following players received entry from the qualifying draw:

- (Uzbekistan) Sanjar Fayziev
- (Uzbekistan) Temur Ismailov
- (Russia) Mikhail Ledovskikh
- (Uzbekistan) Vaja Uzakov

The following players entered as a lucky loser into the singles main draw:

- (Uzbekistan) Odil Akramov

== Men's doubles main draw entrants ==
=== Seeds ===
Country	Player	Country	Player	Rank^{1}	Seed
BLR	Sergey Betov	BLR	Alexander Bury	280	1
IND	Sriram Balaji	TPE	Chen Ti	344	2
IND	Saketh Myneni	IND	Jeevan Nedunchezhiyan	468	3
RUS	Alexander Kudryavtsev	UKR	Denys Molchanov	665	4

- ^{1} Rankings as of 26 May 2014

=== Other entrants ===
The following pairs received wildcards into the doubles main draw:

- (Uzbekistan) Rizo Saidkhodjaev / (Uzbekistan) Diyor Yuldashev
- (Uzbekistan) Ahad Ermatov / (Uzbekistan) Azizbek Lukmanov
- (Uzbekistan) Rasul Akhmadaliev / (Uzbekistan) Khumoun Sultanov

== Women's singles main draw entrants ==
=== Seeds ===
Country	Player	Rank^{1}	Seed
UZB	Nigina Abduraimova	223	1
JPN	Nao Hibino	234	2
JPN	Hiroko Kuwata	251	3
IND	Ankita Raina	290	4
KAZ	Kamila Kerimbayeva	295	5
JPN	Mari Tanaka	301	6
UZB	Sabina Sharipova	311	7
IND	Prarthana Thombare	355	8

- ^{1} Rankings as of 26 May 2014

=== Other entrants ===
The following players received wildcards into the singles main draw:

- (Uzbekistan) ~~Akgul Amanmuradova~~ (withdrew)
- (Uzbekistan) Shakhnoza Khatamova
- (Uzbekistan) Polina Merenkova
- (Uzbekistan) Sarvinoz Saidhujaeva

The following players received entry from the qualifying draw:

- (Kazakhstan) Kamila Kerimbayeva
- (Russia) Varvara Kuznetsova
- (Ukraine) Katya Malikova
- (Uzbekistan) Amina Mukhametshina
- (Uzbekistan) Gulchekhra Mukhammadsidikova
- (Ukraine) Alisa Tymofeyeva
- (Uzbekistan) Komola Umarova
- (Uzbekistan) Guzal Yusupova

The following player received entry by a lucky loser spot:

- (Uzbekistan) Alina Abdurakhimova

== Women's doubles main draw entrants ==
=== Seeds ===
Country	Player	Country	Player	Rank^{1}	Seed
KAZ	Anna Danilina	RUS	Ekaterina Yashina	584	1
JPN	Hiroko Kuwata	JPN	Mari Tanaka	615	2
KAZ	Kamila Kerimbayeva	RUS	Margarita Lazareva	670	3
JPN	Nao Hibino	IND	Prarthana Thombare	687	4

- ^{1} Rankings as of 26 May 2014

=== Other entrants ===
The following pairs received wildcards into the doubles main draw:

- (Uzbekistan) Shakhnoza Khatamova / (Uzbekistan) Sarvinoz Saidhujaeva
- (Uzbekistan) Polina Merenkova / (Uzbekistan) Komola Umarova
- (Uzbekistan) Amina Mukhametshina / (Uzbekistan) Jamilya Sadykzhanova

== Champions ==
=== Men's singles ===
- (Slovenia) Blaž Kavčič def. (Russia) Alexander Kudryavtsev, 6–4, 7–6^{(10–8)}

=== Women's singles ===
- (Uzbekistan) Nigina Abduraimova def. (Japan) Nao Hibino, 6–3, 6–4

=== Men's doubles ===
- (Belarus) Sergey Betov / (Belarus) Alexander Bury def. (Colombia) Nicolás Barrientos / (Russia) Stanislav Vovk 6–7^{(6–8)}, 7–6^{(7–1)}, [10–3]

=== Women's doubles ===
- (Japan) Hiroko Kuwata / (Japan) Mari Tanaka def. (Japan) Nao Hibino / (India) Prarthana Thombare 6–1, 6–4
