= 2014 Fergana Challenger – Women's doubles =

Women's doubles
- 2014 Fergana Challenger

Final
- Champions: (Japan) Hiroko Kuwata (Japan) Mari Tanaka
- Runners-up: (Japan) Nao Hibino (India) Prarthana Thombare
- Score: 6–1, 6–4

Events
| Singles | men | women |
| Doubles | men | women |
- Fergana Challenger

Lyudmyla Kichenok and Polina Pekhova were the defending champions, having won the event in 2013, but both players chose not to participate.

Hiroko Kuwata and Mari Tanaka won the tournament, defeating Nao Hibino and Prarthana Thombare in the final, 6–1, 6–4.

== Seeds ==
1. (Kazakhstan) Anna Danilina / (Russia) Ekaterina Yashina (first round)
2. (Japan) Hiroko Kuwata / (Japan) Mari Tanaka (champions)
3. (Kazakhstan) Kamila Kerimbayeva / (Russia) Margarita Lazareva (semifinals)
4. (Japan) Nao Hibino / (India) Prarthana Thombare (final)

== Draw ==
Key

- Q = Qualifier
- WC = Wild card
- LL = Lucky loser
- Alt = Alternate
- ITF = ITF entry
- PR = Protected ranking
- SR = Special ranking
- SE = Special exempt
- JE = Junior exempt
- JR = Junior Accelerator Programme entrant
- CO = College Accelerator Programme entrant
- NG = Next Gen Accelerator Program entrant
- w/o = Walkover
- r = Retired
- d = Defaulted

First round
1 | (Kazakhstan) A Danilina (Russia) E Yashina | 6 | 6^{2} | [8]
(India) A Raina (Uzbekistan) S Sharipova | 3 | 7^{7} | [10]
WC | (Uzbekistan) A Mukhametshina (Uzbekistan) J Sadykzhanova | 5 | 3
(Japan) Y Miyazaki (Montenegro) A Veselinović | 7 | 6
4 | (Japan) N Hibino (India) P Thombare | 6 | 6
(Georgia (country)) E Gorgodze (Georgia (country)) S Kvatsabaia | 3 | 1
(India) S Baluu (India) R Sunkara | 7^{7} | 6
WC | (Uzbekistan) P Merenkova (Uzbekistan) K Umarova | 6^{4} | 1
(India) A Easwaramurthi (Uzbekistan) V Ekshibarova | 6 | 2
(Israel) E Masuri (China) X Wang | 4 | 0^{r}
(Uzbekistan) A Abdurakhimova (Uzbekistan) A Khabibulina | 6 | 3 | [6]
3 | (Kazakhstan) K Kerimbayeva (Russia) M Lazareva | 1 | 6 | [10]
(Uzbekistan) N Abduraimova (Uzbekistan) A Amanmuradova | 6 | 6
WC | (Uzbekistan) S Khatamova (Uzbekistan) S Saidhujaeva | 4 | 0
(Uzbekistan) A Folts (Uzbekistan) G Yusupova | 2 | 0
2 | (Japan) H Kuwata (Japan) M Tanaka | 6 | 6

Quarterfinals
(India) A Raina (Uzbekistan) S Sharipova | 4 | 4
(Japan) Y Miyazaki (Montenegro) A Veselinović | 6 | 6
4 | (Japan) N Hibino (India) P Thombare | 3 | 6 | [10]
(India) S Baluu (India) R Sunkara | 6 | 3 | [3]
(India) A Easwaramurthi (Uzbekistan) V Ekshibarova | 4 | 3
3 | (Kazakhstan) K Kerimbayeva (Russia) M Lazareva | 6 | 6
(Uzbekistan) N Abduraimova (Uzbekistan) A Amanmuradova
2 | (Japan) H Kuwata (Japan) M Tanaka | w/o

Semifinals
(Japan) Y Miyazaki (Montenegro) A Veselinović | 2 | 6 | [1]
4 | (Japan) N Hibino (India) P Thombare | 6 | 3 | [10]
3 | (Kazakhstan) K Kerimbayeva (Russia) M Lazareva | 1 | 2
2 | (Japan) H Kuwata (Japan) M Tanaka | 6 | 6

Final
4 | (Japan) N Hibino (India) P Thombare | 1 | 4
2 | (Japan) H Kuwata (Japan) M Tanaka | 6 | 6
