= 2012 Tashkent Open – Doubles =

Doubles
- 2012 Tashkent Open

Final
- Champions: (Poland) Paula Kania (Belarus) Polina Pekhova
- Runners-up: (Russia) Anna Chakvetadze (Serbia) Vesna Dolonc
- Score: 6–2, ret.

Details
- Draw: 16
- Seeds: 4

Events
Singles	Doubles
← 2011 ·	Tashkent Open	· 2013 →

Eleni Daniilidou and Vitalia Diatchenko were the defending champions, but decided not to defend their title together. Daniilidou played with Eva Birnerová, but lost in the first round to Lyudmyla Kichenok and Nadiya Kichenok.
Diatchenko played alongside Akgul Amanmuradova, losing in the semifinals to Paula Kania and Polina Pekhova.
They eventually won the title Anna Chakvetadze and Vesna Dolonc retired in the final after losing the first set 2–6.

== Seeds ==
1. (Romania) Irina-Camelia Begu / (Romania) Monica Niculescu (semifinals)
2. (Russia) Nina Bratchikova / (Russia) Alexandra Panova (first round)
3. (Czech Republic) Eva Birnerová / (Greece) Eleni Daniilidou (first round)
4. (France) Alizé Cornet / (Russia) Alla Kudryavtseva (first round)

== Draw ==
=== Key ===
- Q = Qualifier
- WC = Wild card
- LL = Lucky loser
- Alt = Alternate
- SE = Special exempt
- PR = Protected ranking
- ITF = ITF entry
- JE = Junior exempt
- w/o = Walkover
- r = Retired
- d = Defaulted
- SR = Special ranking

=== Draw ===
First round
1	(Romania) I-C Begu (Romania) M Niculescu	6	6
(Ukraine) I Buryachok (Russia) V Solovieva	3	4
WC	(Russia) D Gavrilova (Uzbekistan) S Sharipova	3	3
(Ukraine) V Ivakhnenko (Ukraine) K Kozlova	6	6
4	(France) A Cornet (Russia) A Kudryavtseva	2	6^{5}
(Russia) A Chakvetadze (Serbia) V Dolonc	6	7^{7}
(Slovakia) J Čepelová (United States) J Cohen	6	6
WC	(Uzbekistan) N Abduraimova (Russia) K Lykina	2	3
(Belarus) E Dzehalevich (Kyrgyzstan) K Palkina	3	4
(Poland) P Kania (Belarus) P Pekhova	6	6
(Ukraine) L Kichenok (Ukraine) N Kichenok	6	7^{7}
3	(Czech Republic) E Birnerová (Greece) E Daniilidou	4	6^{2}
(Romania) A Cadanțu (Thailand) N Lertcheewakarn	6^{5}	2
(Georgia (country)) O Kalashnikova (Russia) M Sirotkina	7^{7}	6
(Uzbekistan) A Amanmuradova (Russia) V Diatchenko	6^{4}	6	[12]
2	(Russia) N Bratchikova (Russia) A Panova	7^{7}	4	[10]

Quarterfinals
1	(Romania) I-C Begu (Romania) M Niculescu	6	4	[12]
(Ukraine) V Ivakhnenko (Ukraine) K Kozlova	3	6	[10]
(Russia) A Chakvetadze (Serbia) V Dolonc	6	7^{9}
(Slovakia) J Čepelová (United States) J Cohen	3	6^{7}
(Poland) P Kania (Belarus) P Pekhova	2	6	[10]
(Ukraine) L Kichenok (Ukraine) N Kichenok	6	3	[5]
(Georgia (country)) O Kalashnikova (Russia) M Sirotkina	2	2
(Uzbekistan) A Amanmuradova (Russia) V Diatchenko	6	6

Semifinals
1	(Romania) I-C Begu (Romania) M Niculescu	1	0
(Russia) A Chakvetadze (Serbia) V Dolonc	6	6
(Poland) P Kania (Belarus) P Pekhova	6	4	[10]
(Uzbekistan) A Amanmuradova (Russia) V Diatchenko	4	6	[4]

Final
(Russia) A Chakvetadze (Serbia) V Dolonc	2^{r}
(Poland) P Kania (Belarus) P Pekhova	6
