= 2011 Tashkent Open =

- Date: September 12–17
- Edition: 13th
- Category: WTA International
- Draw: 32S / 16D
- Prize money: $220,000
- Surface: Hard
- Location: Tashkent, Uzbekistan

Champions

Singles
- (Russia) Ksenia Pervak

Doubles
- (Greece) Eleni Daniilidou / (Russia) Vitalia Diatchenko
← 2010 ·	Tashkent Open	· 2012 →

The 2011 Tashkent Open was a women's tennis tournament played on outdoor hard courts. It was the 13th edition of the Tashkent Open, and was part of the WTA International tournaments of the 2011 WTA Tour. It took place at the Tashkent Tennis Center in Tashkent, Uzbekistan, from September 12 through September 17, 2011. First-seeded Ksenia Pervak won the singles title.

== Finals ==
=== Singles ===
(Russia) Ksenia Pervak defeated (Czech Republic) Eva Birnerová, 6–3, 6–1

- It was Pervak's only singles title of her career.

=== Doubles ===
(Greece) Eleni Daniilidou / (Russia) Vitalia Diatchenko defeated (Ukraine) Lyudmyla Kichenok / (Ukraine) Nadiia Kichenok, 6–4, 6–3

== Entrants ==
Country	Player	Rank^{1}	Seed
RUS	Ksenia Pervak	52	1
SRB	Bojana Jovanovski	54	2
FRA	Pauline Parmentier	62	3
LAT	Anastasija Sevastova	66	4
SVK	Magdaléna Rybáriková	70	5
RUS	Alla Kudryavtseva	77	6
RUS	Evgeniya Rodina	83	7
FRA	Aravane Rezaï	86	8

- ^{1} Rankings are as of August 29, 2011.

=== Other entrants ===
The following players received wildcards into the singles main draw:

- (Uzbekistan) Nigina Abduraimova
- (Azerbaijan) Kamilla Farhad
- (Uzbekistan) Sabina Sharipova

The following players received entry from the qualifying draw:

- (Slovakia) Jana Čepelová
- (Greece) Eirini Georgatou
- (Serbia) Aleksandra Krunić
- (France) Victoria Larrière
