= 2010 Tashkent Open – Doubles =

Doubles
- 2010 Tashkent Open

Final
- Champions: (Russia) Alexandra Panova (Belarus) Tatiana Poutchek
- Runners-up: (Romania) Alexandra Dulgheru (Slovakia) Magdaléna Rybáriková
- Score: 6–3, 6–4

Details
- Draw: 16
- Seeds: 4

Events
| Singles | Doubles |
| ← 2009 · | Tashkent Open | · 2011 → |

Olga Govortsova and Tatiana Poutchek were the defending champions, but only Poutchek tries to defend the title.
She partnered with Alexandra Panova and they won this tournament, by defeating Alexandra Dulgheru and Magdaléna Rybáriková 6–3, 6–4 in the final.

== Seeds ==
1. (United States) Jill Craybas / (Romania) Monica Niculescu (semifinals)
2. (Russia) Arina Rodionova / (Ukraine) Olga Savchuk (quarterfinals)
3. (Uzbekistan) Akgul Amanmuradova / (Belarus) Darya Kustova (first round)
4. (Russia) Maria Kondratieva / (France) Sophie Lefèvre (semifinals)

== Draw ==
=== Key ===
- Q = Qualifier
- WC = Wild card
- LL = Lucky loser
- Alt = Alternate
- SE = Special exempt
- PR = Protected ranking
- ITF = ITF entry
- JE = Junior exempt
- w/o = Walkover
- r = Retired
- d = Defaulted
- SR = Special ranking

=== Draw ===
First round
1 | (United States) J Craybas (Romania) M Niculescu | 6 | 6
WC | (Uzbekistan) N Abduraimova (Uzbekistan) S Sharipova | 4 | 1
(Russia) N Bratchikova (Russia) E Ivanova | 7 | 4 | [7]
(Russia) E Rodina (Switzerland) S Vögele | 5 | 6 | [10]
3 | (Uzbekistan) A Amanmuradova (Belarus) D Kustova | 5 | 6^{13}
(Romania) A Dulgheru (Slovakia) M Rybáriková | 7 | 7
(Ukraine) L Kichenok (Ukraine) N Kichenok | 2 | 3
(Italy) ME Camerin (India) S Mirza | 6 | 6
(Russia) E Bovina (Greece) E Georgatou | 6 | 5 | [10]
(Ukraine) Y Fedak (Ukraine) A Vasylyeva | 1 | 7 | [6]
(Belarus) E Dzehalevich (Ukraine) L Tsurenko | 3 | 5
4 | (Russia) M Kondratieva (France) S Lefèvre | 6 | 7
(Uzbekistan) A Khabibulina (Kyrgyzstan) K Palkina | 1 | 1
(Russia) A Panova (Belarus) T Poutchek | 6 | 6
WC | (Uzbekistan) A Abdurakhimova (Uzbekistan) L Azimova | 0 | 0
2 | (Russia) A Rodionova (Ukraine) O Savchuk | 6 | 6

Quarterfinals
1 | (United States) J Craybas (Romania) M Niculescu | 6 | 6
(Russia) E Rodina (Switzerland) S Vögele | 3 | 4
(Romania) A Dulgheru (Slovakia) M Rybáriková | 7 | 6
(Italy) ME Camerin (India) S Mirza | 5 | 1
(Russia) E Bovina (Greece) E Georgatou | 4 | 6 | [9]
4 | (Russia) M Kondratieva (France) S Lefèvre | 6 | 2 | [11]
(Russia) A Panova (Belarus) T Poutchek | 7 | 6
2 | (Russia) A Rodionova (Ukraine) O Savchuk | 6^{2} | 4

Semifinals
1 | (United States) J Craybas (Romania) M Niculescu | 6 | 6^{6} | [6]
(Romania) A Dulgheru (Slovakia) M Rybáriková | 4 | 7 | [10]
4 | (Russia) M Kondratieva (France) S Lefèvre | 3 | 6 | [3]
(Russia) A Panova (Belarus) T Poutchek | 6 | 3 | [10]

Finals
(Romania) A Dulgheru (Slovakia) M Rybáriková | 3 | 4
(Russia) A Panova (Belarus) T Poutchek | 6 | 6
