= 2011 Tashkent Open – Singles =

Singles
- 2011 Tashkent Open

Final
- Champion: (Russia) Ksenia Pervak
- Runner-up: (Czech Republic) Eva Birnerová
- Score: 6–3, 6–1

Details
- Draw: 32
- Seeds: 8

Events
Singles	Doubles
- Tashkent Open

Alla Kudryavtseva was the defending champion and reached the semifinals, but retired against Eva Birnerová due to a left hamstring strain.

Birnerová was later defeated in the final by Ksenia Pervak, 6–3, 6–1.

== Seeds ==
1. (Russia) Ksenia Pervak (champion)
2. (Serbia) Bojana Jovanovski (first round)
3. (France) Pauline Parmentier (first round)
4. (Latvia) Anastasija Sevastova (second round)
5. (Slovakia) Magdaléna Rybáriková (second round)
6. (Russia) Alla Kudryavtseva (semifinals, retired due to a left hamstring strain)
7. (Russia) Evgeniya Rodina (second round)
8. (France) Aravane Rezaï (first round)

== Main draw ==
Key

- Q = Qualifier
- WC = Wild card
- LL = Lucky loser
- Alt = Alternate
- ITF = ITF entry
- PR = Protected ranking
- SR = Special ranking
- SE = Special exempt
- JE = Junior exempt
- JR = Junior Accelerator Programme entrant
- CO = College Accelerator Programme entrant
- NG = Next Gen Accelerator Program entrant
- w/o = Walkover
- r = Retired
- d = Defaulted

=== Finals ===
Semifinals
1	(Russia) Ksenia Pervak	6	6
(Poland) Urszula Radwańska	2	4
(Czech Republic) Eva Birnerová	3	5
6	(Russia) Alla Kudryavtseva	6	3^{r}

Final
1	(Russia) Ksenia Pervak	6	6
(Czech Republic) Eva Birnerová	3	1

=== Top half ===
First round
1	(Russia) K Pervak	6	7
(Kazakhstan) G Voskoboeva	2	5
WC	(Uzbekistan) S Sharipova	6	6
Q	(Greece) E Georgatou	4	1
(Slovakia) Z Kučová	6	4	1
Q	(France) V Larrière	3	6	6
WC	(Uzbekistan) N Abduraimova	7^{7}	4	3
5	(Slovakia) M Rybáriková	6^{5}	6	6
3	(France) P Parmentier	5	1
(Greece) E Daniilidou	7	6
(Japan) M Doi	6	4	6
(Luxembourg) M Minella	2	6	4
Q	(Slovakia) J Čepelová	1	4
(Poland) U Radwańska	6	6
(Uzbekistan) A Amanmuradova	6	6
8	(France) A Rezaï	4	3

Second round
1	(Russia) K Pervak	6	6
WC	(Uzbekistan) S Sharipova	3	3
Q	(France) V Larrière	6	6
5	(Slovakia) M Rybáriková	4	4
(Greece) E Daniilidou	7^{7}	6
(Japan) M Doi	6^{5}	4
(Poland) U Radwańska	6^{2}	6	6
(Uzbekistan) A Amanmuradova	7^{7}	4	3

Quarterfinals
1	(Russia) K Pervak	6	6
Q	(France) V Larrière	1	2
(Greece) E Daniilidou	3	6	4
(Poland) U Radwańska	6	4	6

Semifinals
1	(Russia) K Pervak	6	6
(Poland) U Radwańska	2	4

=== Bottom half ===
First round
7	(Russia) E Rodina	6	4	6
(France) I Brémond	3	6	0
(Japan) J Namigata	4	1
(Czech Republic) E Birnerová	6	6
(Ukraine) L Tsurenko	4	3
(Russia) V Savinykh	6	6
(Ukraine) M Koryttseva	0	6^{1}
4	(Latvia) A Sevastova	6	7^{7}
6	(Russia) A Kudryavtseva	6	7
(Russia) V Dolonts	2	5
(Belarus) O Govortsova	6^{6}	6	4
(Russia) V Diatchenko	7^{8}	3	6
Q	(Serbia) A Krunić	6	6
WC	(Azerbaijan) K Farhad	0	1
(Romania) S Cîrstea	6	6
2	(Serbia) B Jovanovski	3	1

Second round
7	(Russia) E Rodina	7^{7}	4	1
(Czech Republic) E Birnerová	6^{4}	6	6
(Russia) V Savinykh	7	3	6
4	(Latvia) A Sevastova	5	6	3
6	(Russia) A Kudryavtseva	6	2	6
(Russia) V Diatchenko	1	6	3
Q	(Serbia) A Krunić	3	4
(Romania) S Cîrstea	6	6

Quarterfinals
(Czech Republic) E Birnerová	6	4	6
(Russia) V Savinykh	4	6	3
6	(Russia) A Kudryavtseva	7^{7}	6
(Romania) S Cîrstea	6^{5}	4

Semifinals
(Czech Republic) E Birnerová	3	5
6	(Russia) A Kudryavtseva	6	3^{r}

== Qualifying draw ==
=== Seeds ===
1. (Romania) Mădălina Gojnea (qualifying competition)
2. (Japan) Yurika Sema (second round)
3. (Greece) Eirini Georgatou (qualified)
4. (Russia) Marta Sirotkina (qualifying competition)
5. (Serbia) Aleksandra Krunić (qualified)
6. (France) Victoria Larrière (qualified)
7. (Ukraine) Tetyana Arefyeva (second round)
8. (Japan) Ryōko Fuda (second round)

=== Qualifiers ===
1. (Slovakia) Jana Čepelová
2. (France) Victoria Larrière
3. (Greece) Eirini Georgatou
4. (Serbia) Aleksandra Krunić

=== First qualifier ===
First round
1	(Romania) Mădălina Gojnea	6	6
WC	(Uzbekistan) Liliya Izmaylova	0	0
WC	(Russia) Polina Rodionova	6	6
WC	(Uzbekistan) Arina Folts	4	4
(Russia) Yana Buchina	6	2	2
(Slovakia) Jana Čepelová	4	6	6
WC	(Uzbekistan) Alisa Ogordova	1	1
8	(Japan) Ryōko Fuda	6	6

Second round
1	(Romania) Mădălina Gojnea	7	6
WC	(Russia) Polina Rodionova	5	1
(Slovakia) Jana Čepelová	6	6
8	(Japan) Ryōko Fuda	3	2

Qualifying competition
1	(Romania) Mădălina Gojnea	6	3	3
(Slovakia) Jana Čepelová	3	6	6

=== Second qualifier ===
First round
2	(Japan) Yurika Sema	6	6
(Finland) Emma Laine	1	4
WC	(Uzbekistan) Polina Merenkova	4	4
(Slovenia) Dalila Jakupović	6	6
(Georgia (country)) Sofia Shapatava	6	6
WC	(Uzbekistan) Maftuna Yunusova	1	2
(Georgia (country)) Ekaterine Gorgodze	2	3
6	(France) Victoria Larrière	6	6

Second round
2	(Japan) Yurika Sema	3	1
(Slovenia) Dalila Jakupović	6	6
(Georgia (country)) Sofia Shapatava	4	0
6	(France) Victoria Larrière	6	6

Qualifying competition
(Slovenia) Dalila Jakupović	6	3	0
6	(France) Victoria Larrière	4	6	6

=== Third qualifier ===
First round
3	(Greece) Eirini Georgatou	6	6
WC	(Uzbekistan) Lola Azimova	1	1
(Russia) Marina Shamayko	7^{7}	6
WC	(Uzbekistan) Alina Abdurakhimova	6^{1}	3
WC	(Uzbekistan) Yana Khon	0	2
(Belarus) Polina Pekhova	6	6
WC	(Uzbekistan) Natella Nabieva	2	2
7	(Ukraine) Tetyana Arefyeva	6	6

Second round
3	(Greece) Eirini Georgatou	7	7^{7}
(Russia) Marina Shamayko	5	6^{2}
(Belarus) Polina Pekhova	7^{7}	6
7	(Ukraine) Tetyana Arefyeva	6^{4}	4

Qualifying competition
3	(Greece) Eirini Georgatou	6	6
(Belarus) Polina Pekhova	3	3

=== Fourth qualifier ===
First round
4	(Russia) Marta Sirotkina	6	6
WC	(Uzbekistan) Viktoriya Karmenova	2	0
WC	(Uzbekistan) Madina Hatamova	0	1
(Ukraine) Lyudmyla Kichenok	6	6
(Bosnia and Herzegovina) Mervana Jugić-Salkić	6	5	6
(Ukraine) Nadiia Kichenok	4	7	4
(Russia) Ekaterina Yashina	5	2
5	(Serbia) Aleksandra Krunić	7	6

Second round
4	(Russia) Marta Sirotkina	7	7
(Ukraine) Lyudmyla Kichenok	5	5
(Bosnia and Herzegovina) Mervana Jugić-Salkić	2	4
5	(Serbia) Aleksandra Krunić	6	6

Qualifying competition
4	(Russia) Marta Sirotkina	4	6	6^{2}
5	(Serbia) Aleksandra Krunić	6	4	7^{7}
