= 2010 Tashkent Open =

- Date: September 20–26
- Edition: 12th
- Category: WTA International
- Draw: 32S / 16D
- Prize money: $220,000
- Surface: Hard
- Location: Tashkent, Uzbekistan
- Venue: Tashkent Tennis Center

Champions

Singles
- (Russia) Alla Kudryavtseva

Doubles
- (Russia) Alexandra Panova / (Belarus) Tatiana Poutchek
← 2009 ·	Tashkent Open	· 2011 →

The 2010 Tashkent Open was a women's tennis tournament played on outdoor hard courts. It was the 12th edition of the Tashkent Open, and is part of the WTA International tournaments of the 2010 WTA Tour. It was held at the Tashkent Tennis Center in Tashkent, Uzbekistan, from September 20 through September 26, 2010. Seventh-seeded Alla Kudryavtseva won the singles title.

== Finals ==
=== Singles ===
(Russia) Alla Kudryavtseva defeated (Russia) Elena Vesnina 6–4, 6–4.

- It was Kudryavtseva's only singles title of her career.

=== Doubles ===
(Russia) Alexandra Panova' / (Belarus) Tatiana Poutchek defeated (Romania) Alexandra Dulgheru / (Slovakia) Magdaléna Rybáriková, 6–3, 6–4

== Entrants ==
Country	Player	Rank^{1}	Seed
ROU	Alexandra Dulgheru	27	1
UZB	Akgul Amanmuradova	60	2
RUS	Anna Chakvetadze	68	3
RUS	Elena Vesnina	72	4
ROU	Monica Niculescu	81	5
SVK	Magdaléna Rybáriková	85	6
RUS	Alla Kudryavtseva	103	7
ITA	Maria Elena Camerin	106	8

- ^{1} Rankings are based on the rankings of September 13, 2010

=== Other entrants ===
The following players received wildcards into the singles main draw:

- (Uzbekistan) Nigina Abduraimova
- (Uzbekistan) Alina Abdurakhimova
- (Uzbekistan) Sabina Sharipova

The following players received entry from the qualifying draw:

- (Kazakhstan) Zarina Diyas
- (Ukraine) Yuliana Fedak
- (Greece) Eirini Georgatou
- (Russia) Nadejda Guskova

The following player received the lucky loser spot:

- (Kyrgyzstan) Ksenia Palkina
