= Shahar Pe'er career statistics =

Career finals
Discipline	Type	Won	Lost	Total
Singles	Grand Slam	–	–	–
Singles	Summer Olympics	–	–	–
Singles	WTA Finals (Note: Formerly known as: Virginia Slims Championships (until 1995); WTA Tour Championships (until 2014))	–	–	–
Singles	WTA Elite (Note: Elite tier: WTA Tournament of Champions (2009–14); WTA Elite Trophy (2015–present))	–	–	–
Singles	WTA 1000 (Note: Formerly known as: Category 4 & 5 & 6 (until 1990); Tier I (until 2009); WTA Premier Mandatory and 5 (until 2021))	–	–	–
Singles	WTA 500 (Note: Formerly known as: Category 3 (until 1990); Tier II (until 2009); WTA Premier (until 2021))	–	–	–
Singles	WTA 250 (Note: Formerly known as: Category 1 & 2 (until 1990); Tier III & IV & V (until 2009); WTA International (until 2021))	5	4	9
Singles	Total	5	4	9
Doubles	Grand Slam	0	1	1
Doubles	Summer Olympics	–	–	–
Doubles	WTA Finals	–	–	–
Doubles	WTA Elite	–	–	–
Doubles	WTA 1000	0	2	2
Doubles	WTA 500	2	2	4
Doubles	WTA 250	1	2	3
Doubles	Total	3	7	10
Total		8	11	19

This is a list of the main career statistics of professional Israeli tennis player Shahar Peer.

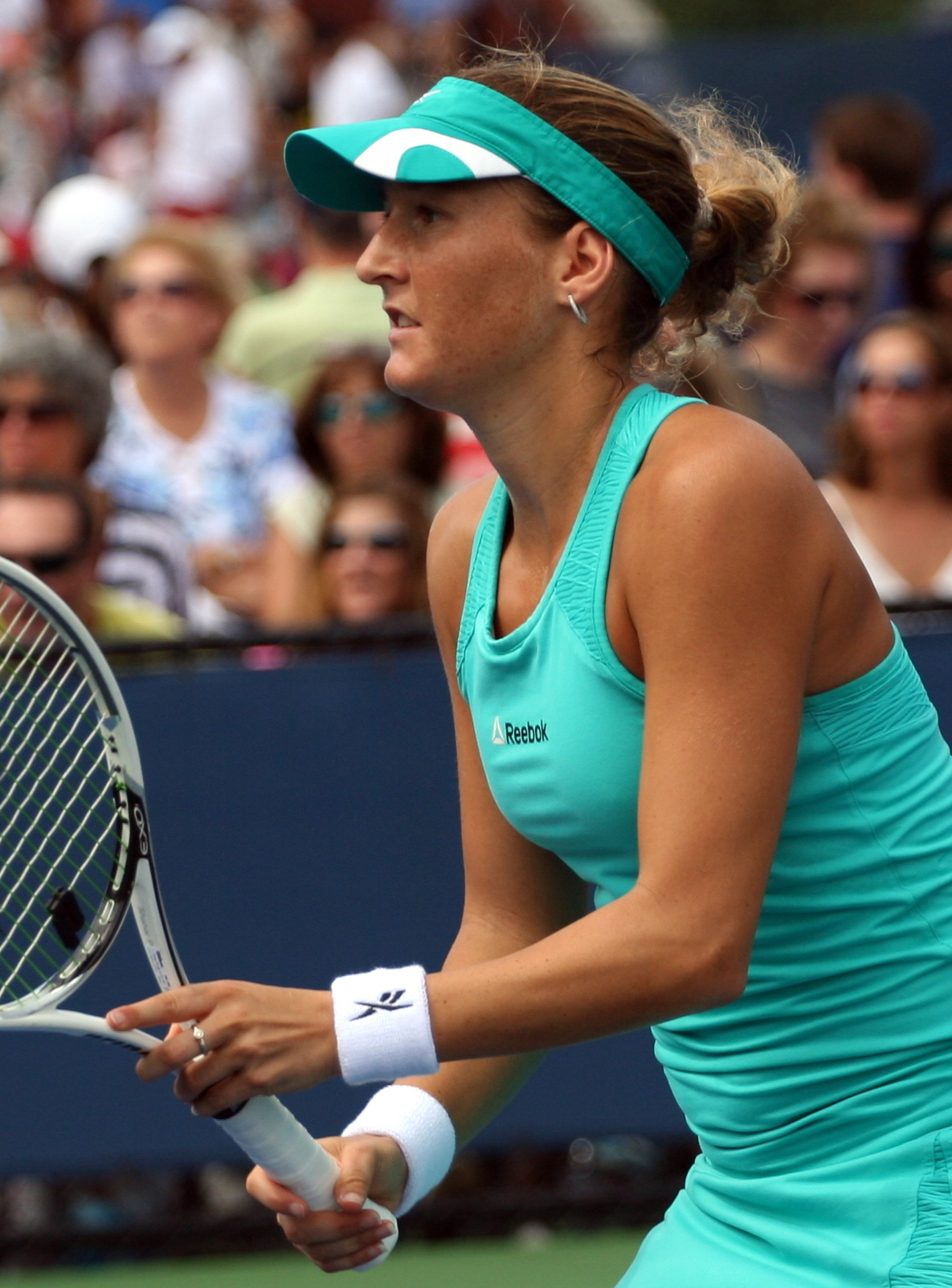
Peer at the 2013 US Open.

== Performance timelines ==
Key
W	F	SF	QF	#R	RR	Q#	P#	DNQ	A	Z#	PO	G	S	B	NMS	NTI	P	NH

(W) winner; (F) finalist; (SF) semifinalist; (QF) quarterfinalist; (#R) rounds 4, 3, 2, 1; (RR) round-robin stage; (Q#) qualification round; (P#) preliminary round; (DNQ) did not qualify; (A) absent; (Z#) Davis/Fed Cup Zonal Group (with number indication) or (PO) play-off; (G) gold, (S) silver or (B) bronze Olympic/Paralympic medal; (NMS) not a Masters tournament; (NTI) not a Tier I tournament; (P) postponed; (NH) not held; (SR) strike rate (events won / competed); (W–L) win–loss record.

Only main-draw results in WTA Tour, Grand Slam tournaments, Billie Jean King Cup (Fed Cup), Hopman Cup and Olympic Games are included in win–loss records.

=== Singles ===
Tournament	2004	2005	2006	2007	2008	2009	2010	2011	2012	2013	2014	2015	2016	SR	W–L	Win%
Grand Slam tournaments
Australian Open	A	Q3	1R	QF	3R	1R	3R	3R	2R	2R	1R	Q3	Q1	0 / 9	12–9	57%
French Open	A	3R	4R	4R	1R	A	4R	1R	2R	1R	1R	Q3	A	0 / 9	12–9	57%
Wimbledon	A	2R	2R	3R	4R	2R	2R	1R	1R	Q3	1R	Q3	A	0 / 9	9–9	50%
US Open	Q2	3R	4R	QF	1R	3R	4R	2R	1R	Q1	2R	Q1	A	0 / 9	16–9	64%
Win–loss	0–0	5–3	7–4	13–4	5–4	3–3	9–4	3–4	2–4	1–2	1–4	0–0	0–0	0 / 36	49–36	58%
Year-end championship
WTA Elite Trophy	DNQ					RR	DNQ							0 / 1	1–1	50%
National representation
Summer Olympics	A	NH			2R	NH			1R	NH				0 / 2	1–2	33%
WTA 1000 + former^{†} tournaments
Dubai / Qatar Open (Note: The first Premier 5 event of the year has switched back and forth between the Dubai Tennis Championships and the Qatar Total Open since 2009. Dubai was classified as a Premier 5 event from 2009 to 2011 before being succeeded by Doha for the 2012–2014 period. In 2015, Dubai regained its Premier 5 status while Doha was demoted to Premier status. The Premier 5 tournaments were reclassified as WTA 1000 tournaments in 2021.)	NMS				3R	A	SF	QF	3R	A	A	Q1	A	0 / 4	11–4	73%
Indian Wells Open	A	A	4R	QF	3R	4R	4R	QF	1R	2R	1R	Q2	A	0 / 9	15–9	63%
Miami Open	Q1	3R	2R	SF	4R	2R	3R	2R	2R	1R	1R	Q1	A	0 / 10	11–10	52%
Berlin / Madrid Open (Note: In 2009, the Berlin Open was replaced by the Madrid Open. The Premier Mandatory tournaments were reclassified as WTA 1000 tournaments in 2021.)	A	A	A	2R	1R	1R	SF	1R	2R	A	A	A	A	0 / 6	6–6	50%
Italian Open	A	A	1R	3R	A	A	3R	3R	2R	A	Q1	A	A	0 / 5	7–5	58%
Canadian Open	A	A	QF	3R	2R	3R	1R	1R	1R	A	Q1	Q1	A	0 / 7	8–7	53%
Cincinnati Open	NMS					Q2	3R	3R	1R	A	Q2	A	A	0 / 3	4–3	57%
Pan Pacific / Wuhan Open (Note: In 2014, the Toray Pan Pacific Open was downgraded to a Premier event and replaced by the Wuhan Open. The Premier 5 tournaments were reclassified as WTA 1000 tournaments in 2021.)	A	A	A	1R	1R	A	2R	2R	A	A	A	A	A	0 / 4	2–4	33%
China Open	NMS					1R	SF	1R	A	Q1	A	A	A	0 / 3	4–3	57%
Charleston Open^{†}	A	1R	A	2R	A	NMS								0 / 2	0–2	0%
Southern California Open^{†}	A	2R	1R	1R	A	NMS								0 / 3	1–3	25%
Kremlin Cup^{†}	A	A	2R	A	A	NMS								0 / 1	1–1	50%
Zurich Open^{†}	A	A	2R	1R	NH/NMS									0 / 2	1–2	33%
Win–loss	0–0	3–3	7–7	12–9	6–6	6–5	20–9	11–9	5–7	1–2	0–2	0–0	0–0	0 / 59	71–59	55%
Career statistics
	2004	2005	2006	2007	2008	2009	2010	2011	2012	2013	2014	2015	2016	SR	W–L	Win%
Tournaments	3	20	23	22	21	23	21	21	23	15	18	3	0	Career total: 213		
Titles	0	0	3	0	0	2	0	0	0	0	0	0	0	Career total: 5		
Finals	0	0	3	1	0	2	1	1	0	1	0	0	0	Career total: 9		
Hard win–loss	3–3	16–13	22–14	32–15	21–18	31–15	34–15	23–15	9–13	8–11	9–14	1–2	2–2	4 / 141	211–150	58%
Clay win–loss	0–1	7–6	19–3	8–4	2–4	7–6	12–4	3–5	6–8	4–5	2–3	1–1	0–0	1 / 50	71–50	59%
Grass win–loss	0–0	1–2	1–2	4–2	3–2	1–1	1–2	0–2	1–3	0–0	1–2	0–0	0–0	0 / 18	13–18	42%
Carpet win–loss	0–0	0–0	1–1	2–1	0–0	0–0	2–1	0–0	0–1	0–0	0–0	0–0	0–0	0 / 4	5–4	56%
Overall win–loss	3–4	24–21	43–20	46–22	26–24	39–22	49–22	26–22	16–25	12–16	12–19	2–3	2–2	5 / 213	300–222	57%
Year-end ranking	183	45	20	17	38	31	13	37	74	77	119	174	1001	$5,148,411		

=== Doubles ===
Tournament	2002	2003	2004	2005	2006	2007	2008	2009	2010	2011	2012	2013	2014	2015	2016	SR	W–L	Win%
Grand Slam tournaments
Australian Open	A	A	A	A	1R	1R	F	1R	2R	3R	2R	1R	QF	1R	A	0 / 10	12–10	55%
French Open	A	A	A	A	3R	3R	QF	A	QF	A	1R	A	1R	2R	A	0 / 7	11–7	61%
Wimbledon	A	A	A	QF	2R	3R	QF	2R	2R	3R	1R	1R	A	Q1	A	0 / 9	13–9	59%
US Open	A	A	A	2R	2R	3R	1R	3R	3R	1R	1R	1R	1R	A	A	0 / 10	8–10	44%
Win–loss	0–0	0–0	0–0	4–2	4–4	6–4	11–4	3–3	7–4	4–3	1–4	0–3	3–3	1–2	0–0	0 / 36	44–36	55%
National representation
Summer Olympics	NH		A	NH			1R	NH			A	NH			A	0 / 1	0–1	0%
WTA 1000 + former^{†} tournaments
Dubai / Qatar Open	NMS						1R	1R	2R	2R	QF	A	A	A	A	0 / 5	4–5	44%
Indian Wells Open	A	A	A	A	2R	QF	2R (Note: Withdraw during the tournament. Not counted as a loss.)	F	1R	1R	1R	A	A	QF	A	0 / 8	9–7	56%
Miami Open	A	A	A	A	1R	2R	SF	2R	1R	SF	QF	A	A	A	A	0 / 7	9–7	56%
Berlin / Madrid Open	A	A	A	A	A	2R	SF	2R	SF	1R	1R	A	A	A	A	0 / 6	7–4	64%
Italian Open	A	A	A	A	2R	1R	A	A	2R	2R	A	A	A	A	A	0 / 4	3–4	43%
Canadian Open	A	A	A	A	SF	2R	A (Note: Was part of the draw but did not play any match.)	1R	SF	2R	1R	A	2R	A	A	0 / 7	9–7	56%
Cincinnati Open	NMS							2R	A	1R	1R	A	A	A	A	0 / 3	1–3	25%
Pan Pacific / Wuhan Open	A	A	A	A	A	1R	1R	A	F	1R	A	A	A	A	A	0 / 4	3–4	43%
China Open	NMS							A	2R	1R	A	A	A	A	A	0 / 2	1–2	33%
Charleston Open^{†}	A	A	A	A	A	1R	A	NMS								0 / 1	0–1	0%
Southern California Open^{†}	NMS		A	1R	2R	2R	A	NMS								0 / 3	2–3	40%
Kremlin Cup^{†}	A	A	A	A	SF	A	A	NMS								0 / 1	2–1	67%
Zurich Open^{†}	A	A	A	A	1R	1R	NMS/NH									0 / 2	0–2	0%
Win–loss	0–0	0–0	0–0	0–1	8–7	6–8	6–4	7–5	12–8	5–9	4–6	0–0	1–1	1–1	0–0	0 / 51	50–49	51%
Career statistics
	2002	2003	2004	2005	2006	2007	2008	2009	2010	2011	2012	2013	2014	2015	2016	SR	W–L	Win%
Tournaments	0 (Note: During the season, she did not play in the main-draw of any WTA Tour-level tournaments. However, she played at the Fed Cup that is not counted as a played tournament but matches counted.)	0	3	11	21	19	16	13	16	16	15	10	14	5	1	Career total: 160		
Titles	0	0	0	0	2	1	0	0	0	0	0	0	0	0	0	Career total: 3		
Finals	0	0	0	0	2	2	1	1	1	0	0	1	2	0	0	Career total: 10		
Hard win–loss	0–0	0–0	0–3	6–7	14–13	15–11	11–13	9–10	14–11	9–13	9–11	3–9	11–11	1–5	3–1	2 / 109	105–118	47%
Clay win–loss	0–1	0–1	0–2	2–1	13–3	4–3	5–2	3–1	9–4	1–2	1–3	4–2	4–3	1–1	0–0	1 / 32	47–29	62%
Grass win–loss	0–0	0–0	0–0	4–2	3–2	2–2	3–2	1–1	1–2	3–2	0–2	0–1	0–1	0–0	0–0	0 / 17	17–17	50%
Carpet win–loss	0–0	0–0	0–0	0–0	2–1	0–2	0–0	0–0	0–0	0–0	0–0	0–0	0–0	0–0	0–0	0 / 2	2–3	40%
Overall win–loss	0–1	0–1	0–5	12–10	32–19	21–18	19–17	13–12	24–17	13–17	10–16	7–12	15–15	2–6	3–1	3 / 160	171–167	51%
Year-end ranking	855	n/a	288	86	27	29	19	56	24	51	79	128	70	141	n/a			

== Significant finals ==
=== Grand Slams ===
==== Doubles: 1 runner–up ====
Result	Year	Championship	Surface	Partner	Opponents	Score
Loss	2008	Australian Open	Hard	(Belarus) Victoria Azarenka	(Ukraine) Alona Bondarenko (Ukraine) Kateryna Bondarenko	6–2, 1–6, 4–6

=== WTA 1000 ===
==== Doubles: 2 runner–ups ====
Result	Year	Tournament	Surface	Partner	Opponents	Score
Loss	2009	Indian Wells Open	Hard	(Argentina) Gisela Dulko	(Belarus) Victoria Azarenka (Russia) Vera Zvonareva	4–6, 6–3, [5–10]
Loss	2010	Pan Pacific Open	Hard	(China) Peng Shuai	(Czech Republic) Iveta Benešová (Czech Republic) Barbora Záhlavová-Strýcová	4–6, 6–4, [8–10]

== WTA Tour finals ==
=== Singles: 9 (5 titles, 4 runners-up) ===
Legend WTA 250 (Tier III / Tier IV / International) (5–4)	Surface Hard (4–4) Clay (1–0)

Result	W–L	Date	Tournament	Tier	Surface	Opponent	Score
Win	1–0	Feb 2006	Pattaya Open, Thailand	Tier IV	Hard	(Croatia) Jelena Kostanić Tošić	6–3, 6–1
Win	2–0	May 2006	Prague Open, Czech Republic	Tier IV	Clay	(Australia) Samantha Stosur	4–6, 6–2, 6–1
Win	3–0	May 2006	İstanbul Cup, Turkey	Tier III	Clay	(Russia) Anastasia Myskina	1–6, 6–3, 7–6^{(7–3)}
Loss	3–1	Feb 2007	U.S. National Indoor Championships	Tier III	Hard	(United States) Venus Williams	1–6, 1–6
Win	4–1	Sep 2009	Guangzhou Open, China	International	Hard	(Italy) Alberta Brianti	6–3, 6–4
Win	5–1	Sep 2009	Tashkent Open, Uzbekistan	International	Hard	(Uzbekistan) Akgul Amanmuradova	6–3, 6–4
Loss	5–2	Jan 2010	Hobart International, Australia	International	Hard	(Ukraine) Alona Bondarenko	2–6, 4–6
Loss	5–3	Jul 2011	Citi Open, U.S.	International	Hard	(Russia) Nadia Petrova	5–7, 2–6
Loss	5–4	Jul 2013	Baku Cup, Azerbaijan	International	Hard	(Ukraine) Elina Svitolina	4–6, 4–6

=== Doubles: 10 (3 titles, 7 runners-up) ===
Legend Grand Slam tournaments (0–1) WTA 1000 (Tier I / Premier 5) (0–2) WTA 500 (Tier II / Premier) (2–2) WTA 250 (Tier IV / International) (1–2)	Titles by surface Hard (2–5) Clay (1–2)

Result	W–L	Date	Tournament	Tier	Surface	Partner	Opponent	Score
Win	1–0	May 2006	Prague Open, Czech Republic	Tier IV	Clay	(France) Marion Bartoli	(United States) Ashley Harkleroad (United States) Bethanie Mattek	6–4, 6–4
Win	2–0	Jul 2006	Bank of the West Classic, U.S.	Tier II	Hard	(Germany) Anna-Lena Grönefeld	(Italy) Maria Elena Camerin (Argentina) Gisela Dulko	6–1, 6–4
Win	3–0	Jul 2007	Bank of the West Classic, U.S. (2)	Tier II	Hard	(India) Sania Mirza	(Belarus) Victoria Azarenka (Russia) Anna Chakvetadze	6–4, 7–6
Loss	3–1	Sep 2007	Luxembourg Open	Tier II	Hard	(Belarus) Victoria Azarenka	(Czech Republic) Iveta Benešová (Slovakia) Janette Husárová	4–6, 2–6
Loss	3–2	Jan 2008	Australian Open	Grand Slam	Hard	(Belarus) Victoria Azarenka	(Ukraine) Alona Bondarenko (Ukraine) Kateryna Bondarenko	6–2, 1–6, 4–6
Loss	3–3	Mar 2009	Indian Wells Open, U.S.	Tier I	Hard	(Argentina) Gisela Dulko	(Belarus) Victoria Azarenka (Russia) Vera Zvonareva	4–6, 6–3, [5–10]
Loss	3–4	Oct 2010	Pan Pacific Open, Japan	Premier 5	Hard	(China) Peng Shuai	(Czech Republic) Iveta Benešová (Czech Republic) Barbora Záhlavová-Strýcová	4–6, 6–4, [8–10]
Loss	3–5	May 2013	Brussels Open, Belgium	Premier	Clay	(Canada) Gabriela Dabrowski	(Germany) Anna-Lena Grönefeld (Czech Republic) Květa Peschke	0–6, 3–6
Loss	3–6	May 2014	Nuremberg Cup, Germany	International	Clay	(Romania) Raluca Olaru	(Netherlands) Michaëlla Krajicek (Czech Republic) Karolína Plíšková	0–6, 6–4, [6–10]
Loss	3–7	Jul 2014	Baku Cup, Azerbaijan	International	Hard	(Romania) Raluca Olaru	(Russia) Alexandra Panova (United Kingdom) Heather Watson	2–6, 6–7^{(3–7)}

== WTA Challenger finals ==
=== Singles: 1 (1 title) ===
Result	W–L	Date	Tournament	Surface	Opponent	Score
Win	1–0	Aug 2013	WTA 125 Suzhou, China	Hard	(China) Zheng Saisai	6–2, 2–6, 6–3

== ITF Circuit finals ==
=== Singles: 9 (5 titles, 4 runner–ups) ===
Legend
$50,000 tournaments
$25,000 tournaments
$10,000 tournaments

Result	W–L	Date	Tournament	Tier	Surface	Opponent	Score
Loss	0–1	May 2002	ITF Tel Aviv, Israel	10,000	Hard	(Israel) Yevgenia Savransky	5–7, 6–1, 4–6
Loss	0–2	Sep 2003	ITF Prešov, Slovakia	10,000	Clay	(Slovakia) Zuzana Zemenová	4–6, 3–6
Loss	0–3	Nov 2003	ITF Istanbul, Turkey	10,000	Hard	(Bulgaria) Tsvetana Pironkova	3–6, 2–6
Win	1–3	Nov 2003	ITF Ramat HaSharon, Israel	10,000	Hard	(Belarus) Olga Govortsova	6–1, 6–0
Win	2–3	Nov 2003	ITF Haifa, Israel	10,000	Hard	(Belarus) Olga Govortsova	6–1, 6–7^{(4–7)}, 6–3
Loss	2–4	Dec 2003	ITF Tel Aviv, Israel	10,000	Hard	(Russia) Nina Bratchikova	4–6, 4–6
Win	3–4	Feb 2004	ITF Bendigo, Australia	25,000	Hard	(Thailand) Suchanun Viratprasert	6–4, 7–5
Win	4–4	Dec 2004	ITF Ra'anana, Israel	25,000	Hard	(Hungary) Zsófia Gubacsi	6–2, 6–1
Win	5–4	Apr 2015	ITF Istanbul, Turkey	50,000	Hard	(Czech Republic) Kristýna Plíšková	1–6, 7–6^{(7–4)}, 7–5

=== Doubles: 6 (4 titles, 2 runner–ups) ===
Legend
$50,000 tournaments
$25,000 tournaments
$10,000 tournaments

Result	W–L	Date	Tournament	Tier	Surface	Partner	Opponents	Score
Loss	0–1	Sep 2003	ITF Prešov, Slovakia	10,000	Clay	(Israel) Efrat Zlotikamin	(Lithuania) Edita Liachovičiūtė (Slovakia) Zuzana Zemenová	0–6, 6–4, 3–6
Loss	0–2	Feb 2004	ITF Bendigo, Australia	25,000	Hard	(Indonesia) Wynne Prakusya	(Australia) Casey Dellaqua (Australia) Nicole Sewell	2–6, 6–1, 2–6
Win	1–2	Jun 2004	ITF Marseille, France	50,000	Clay	(Russia) Elena Vesnina	(France) Kildine Chevalier (Spain) Conchita Martínez Granados	6–1, 6–1
Win	2–2	Dec 2004	ITF Ra'anana, Israel	25,000	Hard	(Israel) Tzipora Obziler	(Morocco) Bahia Mouhtassine (Turkey) İpek Şenoğlu	6–3, 6–0
Win	3–2	May 2005	ITF Ra'anana, Israel (2)	25,000	Hard	(Israel) Tzipora Obziler	(Austria) Daniela Klemenschits (Austria) Sandra Klemenschits	7–6^{(7–2)}, 1–6, 6–2
Win	4–2	Jul 2015	ITF Versmold, Germany	50,000	Clay	(Czech Republic) Eva Hrdinová	(Ukraine) Alona Fomina (Ukraine) Sofiya Kovalets	6–1, 6–3

== Junior Grand Slam finals ==
=== Singles: 1 (1 title) ===
Result	Year	Tournament	Surface	Opponent	Score
Win	2004	Australian Open	Hard	(Czech Republic) Nicole Vaidisova	6–1, 6–4

== Record against other players ==
=== Top 10 wins ===
Season	2006	2007	2008	2009	2010	2011	Total
Wins	1	3	1	0	5	1	11

#	Player	vsRank	Event	Surface	Round	Score
2006
1.	(Russia) Elena Dementieva	8	French Open	Clay	3R	6–4, 7–5
2007
2.	(Switzerland) Patty Schnyder	9	Sydney International, Australia	Hard	2R	7–6^{(7–3)}, 6–2
3.	(Russia) Svetlana Kuznetsova	4	Australian Open	Hard	4R	6–4, 6–2
4.	(Russia) Svetlana Kuznetsova	3	Miami Open, United States	Hard	QF	6–4, 4–6, 6–3
2008
5.	(Russia) Dinara Safina	9	Wimbledon, United Kingdom	Grass	3R	7–5, 6–7^{(4–7)}, 8–6
2010
6.	(Denmark) Caroline Wozniacki	3	Dubai Championships, UAE	Hard	3R	6–2, 7–5
7.	(China) Li Na	10	Dubai Championships, UAE	Hard	QF	7–5, 3–0 ret.
8.	(Poland) Agnieszka Radwańska	8	Stuttgart Open, Germany	Clay (i)	2R	6–3, 6–7^{(4–7)}, 6–2
9.	(Russia) Dinara Safina	3	Stuttgart Open, Germany	Clay (i)	QF	6–3, 6–2
10.	(Russia) Svetlana Kuznetsova	7	Madrid Open, Spain	Clay	1R	6–3, 2–6, 6–0
2011
11.	(Italy) Francesca Schiavone	5	Indian Wells Open, United States	Hard	4R	6–4, 3–6, 7–6^{(7–3)}

=== Double bagels ===
#	Year	Tournament	Surface	Player	Round	vsRank
1	2007	U.S. National Indoor Championships	Hard (i)	(Venezuela) Milagros Sequera	2R	84
2	2012	Qatar Open	Hard	(Morocco) Nadia Lalami	1R	334

== Longest winning streaks ==
=== First 10–match singles winning streak (2006) ===
#	Tournament	Category	Start date	Surface	Round	Opponent	vsRank	Score	Rank
–	Amelia Island, United States	Tier II	3 April 2006	Clay	2R	(Russia) Dinara Safina (9)	20	2–6, 0–6	6
1	Fed Cup Europe/Africa Zone Group, Bulgaria	Team event	17 April 2006	Clay	RR	(Sweden) Sofia Arvidsson	31	6–4, 6–2	36
2	Fed Cup Europe/Africa Zone Group, Bulgaria	Team event	17 April 2006	Clay	RR	(Romania) Monica Niculescu	278	6–4, 6–4	36
3	Fed Cup Europe/Africa Zone Group, Bulgaria	Team event	17 April 2006	Clay	RR	(Estonia) Maret Ani	67	6–0, 6–1	36
4	Fed Cup Europe/Africa Zone Group, Bulgaria	Team event	17 April 2006	Clay	RR	(Belarus) Anastasiya Yakimova	86	6–2, 6–1	36
5	Fed Cup Europe/Africa Zone Group, Bulgaria	Team event	17 April 2006	Clay	PO	(Serbia and Montenegro) Ana Ivanovic	17	6–2, 4–6, 6–4	36
6	Prague Open, Czech Republic	Tier IV	8 May 2006	Clay	1R	(Czech Republic) Nikola Fraňková (WC)	503	6–3, 6–1	35
7	Prague Open, Czech Republic	Tier IV	8 May 2006	Clay	2R	(Czech Republic) Zuzana Ondrášková	96	7–6^{(8–6)}, 0–6, 6–3	35
8	Prague Open, Czech Republic	Tier IV	8 May 2006	Clay	QF	(Ukraine) Alona Bondarenko (8)	68	7–5, 6–0	35
9	Prague Open, Czech Republic	Tier IV	8 May 2006	Clay	SF	(Estonia) Kaia Kanepi	84	6–3, 6–0	35
10	Prague Open, Czech Republic	Tier IV	8 May 2006	Clay	F	(Australia) Samantha Stosur (5)	55	4–6, 6–2, 6–1	35
–	Italian Open, Italy	Tier I	15 May 2006	Clay	1R	(Russia) Vera Zvonareva	67	6–1, 2–6, 0–6	32

=== Second 10–match (12 with qualifiers) singles winning streak (2009) ===
#	Tournament	Category	Start date	Surface	Round	Opponent	vsRank	Score	Rank
–	US Open, United States	Grand Slam	31 August 2009	Hard	3R	(Russia) Svetlana Kuznetsova (6)	6	5–7, 1–6	64
1	Guangzhou International, China	WTA International	14 September 2009	Hard	1R	(Germany) Kathrin Wörle	130	6–1, 6–4	57
2	Guangzhou International, China	WTA International	14 September 2009	Hard	2R	(Uzbekistan) Akgul Amanmuradova	122	6–3, 6–3	57
3	Guangzhou International, China	WTA International	14 September 2009	Hard	QF	(Chinese Taipei) Chan Yung-jan	140	6–3, 6–1	57
4	Guangzhou International, China	WTA International	14 September 2009	Hard	SF	(China) Peng Shuai (3)	48	6–4, 1–0 ret.	57
5	Guangzhou International, China	WTA International	14 September 2009	Hard	F	(Italy) Alberta Brianti (8)	85	6–3, 6–4	57
6	Tashkent Open, Uzbekistan	WTA International	21 September 2009	Hard	1R	(Estonia) Maret Ani	156	6–1, 6–2	46
7	Tashkent Open, Uzbekistan	WTA International	21 September 2009	Hard	2R	(Germany) Kathrin Wörle	129	6–2, 6–4	46
8	Tashkent Open, Uzbekistan	WTA International	21 September 2009	Hard	QF	(Russia) Alexandra Panova (Q)	160	6–4, 6–4	46
9	Tashkent Open, Uzbekistan	WTA International	21 September 2009	Hard	SF	(Belarus) Olga Govortsova (4)	73	7–6^{(7–5)}, 6–2	46
10	Tashkent Open, Uzbekistan	WTA International	21 September 2009	Hard	F	(Uzbekistan) Akgul Amanmuradova	113	6–3, 6–4	46
–	China Open, China	WTA Premier Mandatory	5 October 2009	Hard	Q1	(Chinese Taipei) Chang Kai-chen	132	4–6, 6–4, 6–4	34
–	China Open, China	WTA Premier Mandatory	5 October 2009	Hard	Q2	(United States) Vania King	90	2–6, 6–0, 6–4	34
–	China Open, China	WTA Premier Mandatory	5 October 2009	Hard	1R	(Russia) Ekaterina Makarova	55	4–6, 2–6	34
