= 2014 Fergana Challenger – Men's singles =

Men's singles
- 2014 Fergana Challenger

Final
- Champion: (Slovenia) Blaž Kavčič
- Runner-up: (Russia) Alexander Kudryavtsev
- Score: 6–4, 7–6^{(10–8)}

Events
Singles	men	women
Doubles	men	women
- Fergana Challenger

Radu Albot was the defending champion but decided to participate at the 2014 Košice Open instead.

Blaž Kavčič won the title, defeating Alexander Kudryavtsev in the final, 6–4, 7–6^{(10–8)}.

== Seeds ==
1. (Slovenia) Blaž Kavčič (champion)
2. (Russia) Alexander Kudryavtsev (final)
3. (Georgia (country)) Nikoloz Basilashvili (second round)
4. (Ukraine) Denys Molchanov (semifinals)
5. (Russia) Valery Rudnev (quarterfinals)
6. (Belarus) Egor Gerasimov (semifinals)
7. (Japan) Shuichi Sekiguchi (quarterfinals)
8. (Russia) Alexander Lobkov (quarterfinals)

== Draw ==
Key

- Q = Qualifier
- WC = Wild card
- LL = Lucky loser
- Alt = Alternate
- ITF = ITF entry
- PR = Protected ranking
- SR = Special ranking
- SE = Special exempt
- JE = Junior exempt
- JR = Junior Accelerator Programme entrant
- CO = College Accelerator Programme entrant
- NG = Next Gen Accelerator Program entrant
- w/o = Walkover
- r = Retired
- d = Defaulted

=== Finals ===
Semifinals
1	(Slovenia) Blaž Kavčič	6	6
4	(Ukraine) Denys Molchanov	3	0
6	(Belarus) Egor Gerasimov	2	6	3
2	(Russia) Alexander Kudryavtsev	6	1	6

Final
1	(Slovenia) Blaž Kavčič	6	7^{10}
2	(Russia) Alexander Kudryavtsev	4	6^{8}

=== Top half ===
First round
1	(Slovenia) B Kavčič	7^{7}	6
(Austria) B Trinker	6^{4}	4
Alt	(Uzbekistan) Shonigmatjon Shofayziyev	7	6
Alt	(Uzbekistan) Batyr Sapaev	5	3
(India) J Nedunchezhiyan	6	6
WC	(Uzbekistan) Rasul Akhmadaliev	1	1
(Belarus) A Bury	6	4	2
8	(Russia) Alexander Lobkov	3	6	6
4	(Ukraine) D Molchanov	6	7
(India) S Myneni	4	5
Q	(Uzbekistan) T Ismailov	6	6
WC	(Uzbekistan) D Karimov	3	0
WC	(Uzbekistan) K Sultanov	4	3
Q	(Uzbekistan) S Fayziev	6	6
LL	(Uzbekistan) Odil Akramov	1	1
7	(Japan) Shuichi Sekiguchi	6	6

Second round
1	(Slovenia) B Kavčič	6	6
Alt	(Uzbekistan) S Shofayziyev	2	2
(India) J Nedunchezhiyan	4	4
8	(Russia) A Lobkov	6	6
4	(Ukraine) D Molchanov	6	7^{7}
Q	(Uzbekistan) T Ismailov	3	6^{4}
Q	(Uzbekistan) S Fayziev	3	2
7	(Japan) S Sekiguchi	6	6

Quarterfinals
1	(Slovenia) B Kavčič	6	6
8	(Russia) A Lobkov	3	2
4	(Ukraine) D Molchanov	7^{7}	6
7	(Japan) S Sekiguchi	6^{3}	2

Semifinals
1	(Slovenia) B Kavčič	6	6
4	(Ukraine) D Molchanov	3	0

=== Bottom half ===
First round
6	(Belarus) E Gerasimov	6	6^{3}	6
(Russia) S Vovk	3	7^{7}	4
Q	(Uzbekistan) V Uzakov	1	2
Q	(Russia) M Ledovskikh	6	6
(Russia) D Matsukevich	6	3	6^{1}
(Colombia) N Barrientos	3	6	7^{7}
(India) S Balaji	4	3
3	(Georgia (country)) N Basilashvili	6	6
5	(Russia) V Rudnev	6	3	7
(Thailand) K Wachiramanowong	1	6	5
Alt	(Belarus) Artur Dubinski	6	6
(Switzerland) L Margaroli	2	2
WC	(Uzbekistan) Rizo Saidkhodjaev	0	2
Alt	(Uzbekistan) S Ikramov	6	6
(Chinese Taipei) T Chen	4	5
2	(Russia) A Kudryavtsev	6	7

Second round
6	(Belarus) E Gerasimov	2	6	7^{7}
Q	(Russia) M Ledovskikh	6	1	6^{2}
(Colombia) N Barrientos	7^{11}	6
3	(Georgia (country)) N Basilashvili	6^{9}	4
5	(Russia) V Rudnev	6	6
Alt	(Belarus) A Dubinski	3	2
Alt	(Uzbekistan) S Ikramov	4	0
2	(Russia) A Kudryavtsev	6	6

Quarterfinals
6	(Belarus) E Gerasimov	6^{6}	7^{7}	7
(Colombia) N Barrientos	7^{8}	6^{3}	5
5	(Russia) V Rudnev	0	2
2	(Russia) A Kudryavtsev	6	6

Semifinals
6	(Belarus) E Gerasimov	2	6	3
2	(Russia) A Kudryavtsev	6	1	6
