= 2014 Fergana Challenger – Men's doubles =

Men's doubles
- 2014 Fergana Challenger

Final
- Champions: (Belarus) Sergey Betov (Belarus) Alexander Bury
- Runners-up: (Colombia) Nicolás Barrientos (Russia) Stanislav Vovk
- Score: 6–7^{(6–8)}, 7–6^{(7–1)}, [10–3]

Events
Singles	men	women
Doubles	men	women
← 2013 ·	Fergana Challenger	· 2015 →

Farrukh Dustov and Malek Jaziri were the defending champions, but decided not to compete.

Sergey Betov and Alexander Bury won the title, defeating Nicolás Barrientos and Stanislav Vovk in the final, 6–7^{(6–8)}, 7–6^{(7–1)}, [10–3].

== Seeds ==
1. (Belarus) Sergey Betov / (Belarus) Alexander Bury (champions)
2. (India) Sriram Balaji / (Chinese Taipei) Chen Ti (quarterfinals)
3. (India) Saketh Myneni / (India) Jeevan Nedunchezhiyan (first round)
4. (Russia) Alexander Kudryavtsev / (Ukraine) Denys Molchanov (semifinals)

== Draw ==
=== Key ===
- Q = Qualifier
- WC = Wild card
- LL = Lucky loser
- Alt = Alternate
- SE = Special exempt
- PR = Protected ranking
- ITF = ITF entry
- JE = Junior exempt
- w/o = Walkover
- r = Retired
- d = Defaulted
- SR = Special ranking

=== Draw ===
First round
1	(Belarus) S Betov (Belarus) A Bury	6	6^{6}	[10]
(Uzbekistan) Shonigmatjon Shofayziyev (Uzbekistan) V Uzakov	4	7^{8}	[7]
(Russia) Alexander Lobkov (Thailand) K Wachiramanowong	6	3
WC	(Uzbekistan) Rizo Saidkhodjaev (Uzbekistan) Diyor Yuldashev	4	3
4	(Russia) A Kudryavtsev (Ukraine) D Molchanov	6	6
(Uzbekistan) S Fayziev (Uzbekistan) T Ismailov	1	4
(Russia) M Ledovskikh (Russia) V Rudnev	2	4
(Uzbekistan) S Ikramov (Uzbekistan) D Karimov	6	6
WC	(Uzbekistan) Ahad Ermatov (Uzbekistan) Azizbek Lukmanov	6	3	[8]
(Georgia (country)) N Basilashvili (United States) Amrit Narasimhan	4	6	[10]
(Switzerland) L Margaroli (Japan) Shuichi Sekiguchi	2	6
3	(India) S Myneni (India) J Nedunchezhiyan	6	4	r
WC	(Uzbekistan) Rasul Akhmadaliev (Uzbekistan) K Sultanov	3	2
(Colombia) N Barrientos (Russia) S Vovk	6	6
(Belarus) E Gerasimov (Russia) D Matsukevich	4	2
2	(India) S Balaji (Chinese Taipei) T Chen	6	6

Quarterfinals
1	(Belarus) S Betov (Belarus) A Bury	6	6
(Russia) A Lobkov (Thailand) K Wachiramanowong	3	4
4	(Russia) A Kudryavtsev (Ukraine) D Molchanov	7^{7}	6
(Uzbekistan) S Ikramov (Uzbekistan) D Karimov	6^{3}	1
(Georgia (country)) N Basilashvili (United States) A Narasimhan	5	4
(Switzerland) L Margaroli (Japan) S Sekiguchi	7	6
(Colombia) N Barrientos (Russia) S Vovk	6	7^{7}
2	(India) S Balaji (Chinese Taipei) T Chen	5	6^{4}

Semifinals
1	(Belarus) S Betov (Belarus) A Bury	7	6
4	(Russia) A Kudryavtsev (Ukraine) D Molchanov	5	3
(Switzerland) L Margaroli (Japan) S Sekiguchi	1	6	[13]
(Colombia) N Barrientos (Russia) S Vovk	6	3	[15]

Final
1	(Belarus) S Betov (Belarus) A Bury	6^{6}	7^{7}	[10]
(Colombia) N Barrientos (Russia) S Vovk	7^{8}	6^{1}	[3]
