= 2009 Tashkent Open – Doubles =

Doubles
- 2009 Tashkent Open

Final
- Champion: (Belarus) Olga Govortsova (Belarus) Tatiana Poutchek
- Runner-up: (Russia) Vitalia Diatchenko (Belarus) Ekaterina Dzehalevich
- Score: 6–2, 6–7^{(1–7)}, [10–8]

Details
- Draw: 16
- Seeds: 4

Events
Singles	Doubles
← 2008 ·	Tashkent Open	· 2010 →

Ioana Raluca Olaru and Olga Savchuk were the defending champions, both of them were present this year, but played with different partners.
Olaru partnered with Galina Voskoboeva, but they lost in the first round against Arina Rodionova and Olga Savchuk.
Savchuk partnered with Arina Rodionova, but they lost in the semifinals against Vitalia Diatchenko and Ekaterina Dzehalevich.

== Seeds ==
1. (Turkey) İpek Şenoğlu / (Kazakhstan) Yaroslava Shvedova (quarterfinals)
2. (Uzbekistan) Akgul Amanmuradova / (Belarus) Darya Kustova (quarterfinals)
3. (Romania) Ioana Raluca Olaru / (Kazakhstan) Galina Voskoboeva (first round)
4. (Russia) Maria Kondratieva / (France) Sophie Lefèvre (first round)

== Draw ==
=== Key ===
- Q = Qualifier
- WC = Wild card
- LL = Lucky loser
- Alt = Alternate
- SE = Special exempt
- PR = Protected ranking
- ITF = ITF entry
- JE = Junior exempt
- w/o = Walkover
- r = Retired
- d = Defaulted
- SR = Special ranking

First round
1	(Turkey) İ Şenoğlu (Kazakhstan) Y Shvedova	6	7
(Slovakia) K Kučová (Germany) K Wörle	3	5
(Belarus) O Govortsova (Belarus) T Poutchek	6	6
(Russia) E Chalova (Czech Republic) N Fraňková	2	3
4	(Russia) M Kondratieva (France) S Lefèvre	1	4
(Romania) M Niculescu (United States) A Rolle	6	6
WC	(Uzbekistan) A Khabibulina (Uzbekistan) I Tulyaganova	7	1	[11]
(Italy) ME Camerin (Kyrgyzstan) K Palkina	6^{2}	6	[13]
(Ukraine) Y Fedak (Russia) V Manasieva	6	3	[10]
(Estonia) M Ani (Ukraine) L Tsurenko	4	6	[4]
(Russia) Ar Rodionova (Ukraine) O Savchuk	5	7	[11]
3	(Romania) IR Olaru (Kazakhstan) G Voskoboeva	7	6^{5}	[9]
(Austria) P Mayr (Switzerland) S Vögele	4	6^{4}
(Russia) V Diatchenko (Belarus) E Dzehalevich	6	7
(Russia) E Bychkova (Russia) A Panova	2	1
2	(Uzbekistan) A Amanmuradova (Belarus) D Kustova	6	6

Quarterfinals
1	(Turkey) İ Şenoğlu (Kazakhstan) Y Shvedova	4	6	[4]
(Belarus) O Govortsova (Belarus) T Poutchek	6	4	[10]
(Romania) M Niculescu (United States) A Rolle	w/o
(Italy) ME Camerin (Kyrgyzstan) K Palkina
(Ukraine) Y Fedak (Russia) V Manasieva	1	1
(Russia) Ar Rodionova (Ukraine) O Savchuk	6	6
(Russia) V Diatchenko (Belarus) E Dzehalevich	6	1	[10]
2	(Uzbekistan) A Amanmuradova (Belarus) D Kustova	2	6	[8]

Semifinals
(Belarus) O Govortsova (Belarus) T Poutchek	6	6
(Romania) M Niculescu (United States) A Rolle	1	2
(Russia) Ar Rodionova (Ukraine) O Savchuk	6	1	[9]
(Russia) V Diatchenko (Belarus) E Dzehalevich	3	6	[11]

Final
(Belarus) O Govortsova (Belarus) T Poutchek	6	6^{1}	[10]
(Russia) V Diatchenko (Belarus) E Dzehalevich	2	7	[8]
