= 2009 Tashkent Open =

- Date: 21–27 September
- Edition: 11th
- Category: WTA International
- Draw: 32S / 16D
- Prize money: $220,000
- Surface: Hard
- Location: Tashkent, Uzbekistan
- Venue: Olympic Tennis School

Champions

Singles
- (Israel) Shahar Pe'er

Doubles
- (Belarus) Olga Govortsova / (Belarus) Tatiana Poutchek
- Tashkent Open

The 2009 Tashkent Open was a women's tennis tournament played on outdoor hard courts. It was the 11th edition of the Tashkent Open, and was part of the WTA International tournaments of the 2009 WTA Tour. It was held at the Olympic Tennis School in Tashkent, Uzbekistan, from 21 September through 27 September 2009. Second-seeded Shahar Pe'er won the singles title.

== Finals ==
=== Singles ===
(Israel) Shahar Pe'er defeated (Uzbekistan) Akgul Amanmuradova 6–3, 6–4

- It was Pe'er's 2nd and last singles title of the year and the 5th and last of her career.

=== Doubles ===
(Belarus) Olga Govortsova / (Belarus) Tatiana Poutchek defeated (Russia) Vitalia Diatchenko / (Belarus) Ekaterina Dzehalevich 6–2, 6–7^{(1–7)}, [10–8]

== WTA entrants ==
=== Seeds ===
Country	Player	Rank^{1}	Seed
KAZ	Yaroslava Shvedova	55	1
ISR	Shahar Pe'er	57	2
ROU	Ioana Raluca Olaru	66	3
BLR	Olga Govortsova	73	4
SUI	Stefanie Vögele	74	5
ROU	Monica Niculescu	78	6
AUT	Patricia Mayr	83	7
KAZ	Galina Voskoboeva	96	8

- ^{1} Rankings are based on the rankings of September 14, 2009

=== Other entrants ===
The following players received wildcards into the singles main draw

- (Uzbekistan) Nigina Abduraimova
- (Uzbekistan) Alexandra Kolesnichenko
- (Uzbekistan) Sabina Sharipova

The following players received entry from the qualifying draw:

- (Russia) Alexandra Panova
- (Ukraine) Lesia Tsurenko
- (Russia) Ksenia Lykina
- (Russia) Arina Rodionova

The following players received entry as a Lucky loser

- (Ukraine) Yuliana Fedak
