= 2009 Tashkent Open – Singles =

Singles
- 2009 Tashkent Open

Final
- Champions: (Israel) Shahar Pe'er
- Runners-up: (Uzbekistan) Akgul Amanmuradova
- Score: 6-3, 6-4

Details
- Draw: 32
- Seeds: 8

Events
Singles	Doubles
- Tashkent Open

Sorana Cîrstea was the defending champion, but she chose to participate at the Hansol Korea Open instead.
Shahar Pe'er won in the final 6–3, 6–4 against Akgul Amanmuradova.

== Seeds ==
1. (Kazakhstan) Yaroslava Shvedova (semifinals)
2. (Israel) Shahar Pe'er (champion)
3. (Romania) Ioana Raluca Olaru (first round)
4. (Belarus) Olga Govortsova (semifinals)
5. (Switzerland) Stefanie Vögele (quarterfinals)
6. (Romania) Monica Niculescu (quarterfinals)
7. (Austria) Patricia Mayr (second round)
8. (Kazakhstan) Galina Voskoboeva (second round)

== Draw ==
Key

- Q = Qualifier
- WC = Wild card
- LL = Lucky loser
- Alt = Alternate
- ITF = ITF entry
- PR = Protected ranking
- SR = Special ranking
- SE = Special exempt
- JE = Junior exempt
- JR = Junior Accelerator Programme entrant
- CO = College Accelerator Programme entrant
- NG = Next Gen Accelerator Program entrant
- w/o = Walkover
- r = Retired
- d = Defaulted

=== Finals ===
Semifinals
1	(Kazakhstan) Yaroslava Shvedova	4	6^{3}
(Uzbekistan) Akgul Amanmuradova	6	7
4	(Belarus) Olga Govortsova	6^{5}	2
2	(Israel) Shahar Pe'er	7	6

Final
(Uzbekistan) Akgul Amanmuradova	3	4
2	(Israel) Shahar Pe'er	6	6

=== Top half ===
First round
1	(Kazakhstan) Y Shvedova	6	6
(Italy) ME Camerin	1	1
(Russia) E Ivanova	7	7
(Slovakia) L Wienerová	6^{5}	5
(Russia) Y Rodina	7	7
(Slovakia) K Kučová	6^{5}	6^{1}
(Italy) C Dentoni	3	0
6	(Romania) M Niculescu	6	6
3	(Romania) IR Olaru	5	5
(Russia) E Bychkova	7	7
(Uzbekistan) A Amanmuradova	6	4	6
Q	(Russia) K Lykina	1	6	3
WC	(Uzbekistan) N Abduraimova	6	6
Q	(Ukraine) L Tsurenko	3	2
(Russia) V Diatchenko	3	5
5	(Switzerland) S Vögele	6	7

Second round
1	(Kazakhstan) Y Shvedova	7	6
(Russia) E Ivanova	5	2
(Russia) Y Rodina	1	4
6	(Romania) M Niculescu	6	6
(Russia) E Bychkova	6	5	6^{4}
(Uzbekistan) A Amanmuradova	4	7	7
WC	(Uzbekistan) N Abduraimova	2	7	3
5	(Switzerland) S Vögele	6	5	6

Quarterfinals
1	(Kazakhstan) Y Shvedova	6^{3}	7	6
6	(Romania) M Niculescu	7	5	2
(Uzbekistan) A Amanmuradova	6	6
5	(Switzerland) S Vögele	1	4

Semifinals
1	(Kazakhstan) Y Shvedova	4	6^{3}
(Uzbekistan) A Amanmuradova	6	7

=== Bottom half ===
First round
8	(Kazakhstan) G Voskoboeva	6	3	6
(Portugal) N Silva	4	6	4
(Belarus) D Kustova	6	6
LL	(Ukraine) Y Fedak	2	4
WC	(Uzbekistan) A Kolesnichenko	1	1
(Russia) V Manasieva	6	6
Q	(Russia) Ar Rodionova	3	2
4	(Belarus) O Govortsova	6	6
7	(Austria) P Mayr	7	6
(Belarus) E Dzehalevich	5	4
(Czech Republic) S Záhlavová	2	1
Q	(Russia) A Panova	6	6
(Germany) K Wörle	7	7
WC	(Uzbekistan) S Sharipova	6^{0}	5
(Estonia) M Ani	1	2
2	(Israel) S Pe'er	6	6

Second round
8	(Kazakhstan) G Voskoboeva	6	3	6^{9}
(Belarus) D Kustova	1	6	7
(Russia) V Manasieva	3	2
4	(Belarus) O Govortsova	6	6
7	(Austria) P Mayr	5	1
Q	(Russia) A Panova	7	6
(Germany) K Wörle	2	4
2	(Israel) S Pe'er	6	6

Quarterfinals
(Belarus) D Kustova	3	6	2
4	(Belarus) O Govortsova	6	2	6
Q	(Russia) A Panova	4	4
2	(Israel) S Pe'er	6	6

Semifinals
4	(Belarus) O Govortsova	6^{5}	2
2	(Israel) S Pe'er	7	6
