= Ksenia Pervak =

Russian tennis player (born 1991)

Ksenia Pervak Ксения Первак
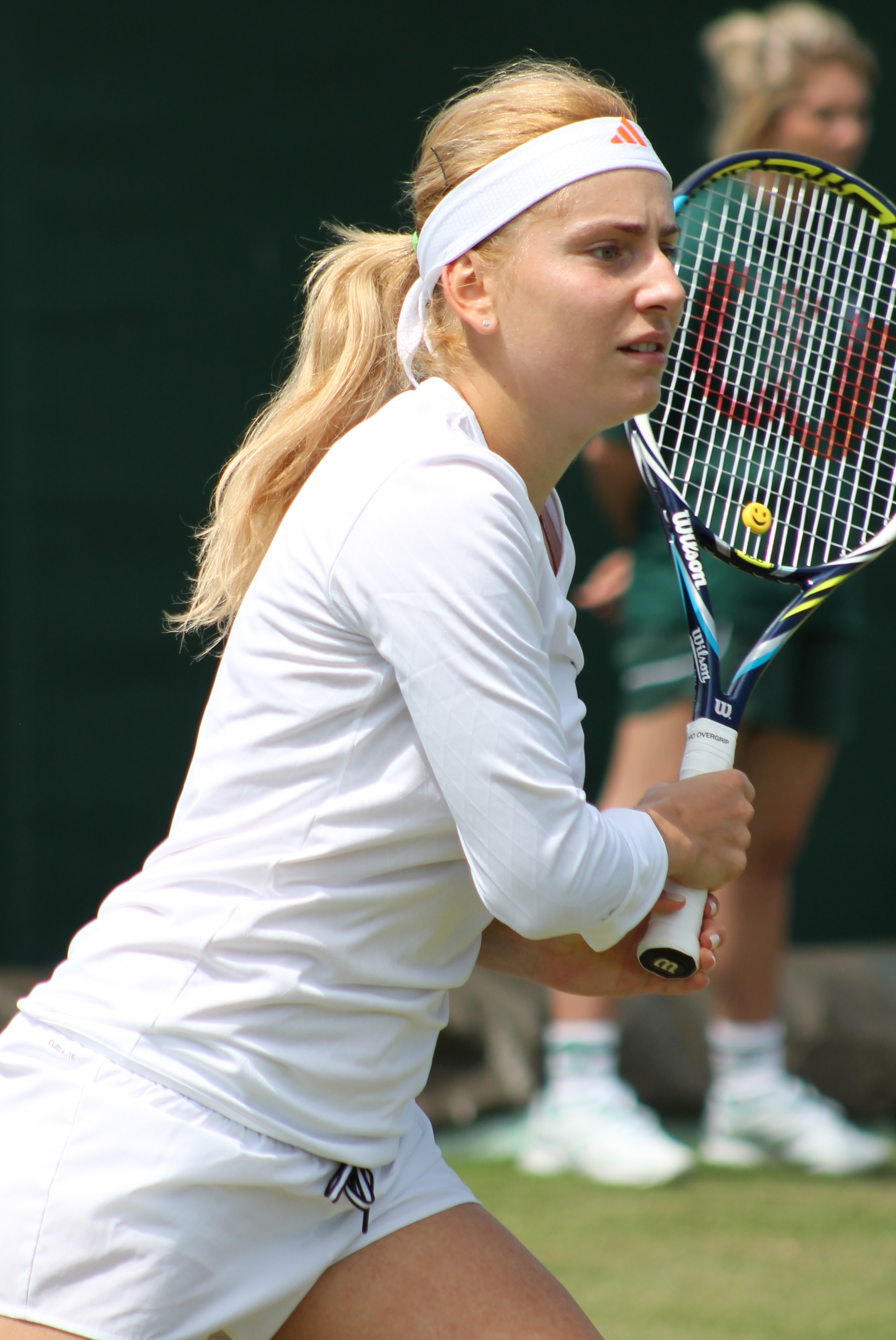
- Pervak at the 2014 Wimbledon Qualifying
- Full name: Ksenia Yuryevna Pervak
- Country (sports): Russia (2005–2011, 2013–2017); Kazakhstan (2011–2013)
- Residence: Moscow, Russia
- Born: 27 May 1991 (age 35) Chelyabinsk, Russian SFSR, Soviet Union
- Height: 1.70 m (5 ft 7 in)
- Turned pro: 2005
- Retired: 2017
- Plays: Left (two-handed backhand)
- Prize money: US$ 1,024,792

Singles
- Career record: 269–153
- Career titles: 1 WTA, 9 ITF
- Highest ranking: No. 37 (19 September 2011)

Grand Slam singles results
- Australian Open: 2R (2013)
- French Open: 1R (2010, 2011, 2012, 2014)
- Wimbledon: 4R (2011)
- US Open: 1R (2010, 2011, 2012, 2014)

Doubles
- Career record: 42–44
- Career titles: 3 ITF
- Highest ranking: No. 123 (30 January 2012)

Grand Slam doubles results
- Australian Open: 2R (2013)
- French Open: 1R (2012)
- Wimbledon: 1R (2012)
- US Open: 1R (2011)

Team competitions
- Fed Cup: 3–1

Ksenia Yuryevna Pervak (Russian: Ксения Юрьевна Первак; born 27 May 1991) is a former tennis player from Russia.

Pervak won one singles title on the WTA Tour, as well as nine singles and three doubles titles on the ITF Circuit. On 19 September 2011, she reached her best singles ranking of world No. 37. On 30 January 2012, she peaked at No. 123 in the doubles rankings.

Pervak won the 2009 Australian Open girls' singles title, defeating Laura Robson in straight sets in the final.

In November 2015, she announced her retirement from professional tennis due to chronic injuries. However, she did return to tennis briefly, playing four tournaments between September 2016 and January 2017. Her last match was a loss in the first qualifying round of the Australian Open.

== Career ==
=== 2009 ===
Pervak made it to the second round of the Pattaya Open where she lost to second seed Caroline Wozniacki in three sets. She then won three qualifying matches to advance to the main draw in 's-Hertogenbosch where she defeated Czech Petra Cetkovská in the first round. Pervak also won the Australian Open junior tournament in that year, defeating Laura Robson in the final.

=== 2010 ===
In early February, Pervak lost in the first round of the Pattaya Open to then world No. 14, Vera Zvonareva. Pervak then reached the Malaysian Open main draw but lost to Noppawan Lertcheewakarn, in the first round. At the French Open, she reached the main draw where she lost to Maria Sharapova in the first round. At the Slovenia Open, Pervak reached her first WTA Tour semifinal against Johanna Larsson but she had to retire due to a wrist injury.

At the Guangzhou International Open, she defeated the No. 2 seed Chan Yung-jan in the first round, and reached the quarterfinals by defeating Russian compatriot Alexandra Panova, winning 24 of 27 points in the final set.

=== 2011 ===
Pervak kicked off her 2011 season in Brisbane, Australia, where she was seeded seventh for the qualifying draw of the Brisbane International. She defeated Jessica Moore and Alexandra Panova but was defeated by Anastasia Pivovarova in the third qualifying round. She gained entry into the main draw as a lucky loser and defeated Anna Chakvetadze in the first round, before losing in the second to Petra Kvitová.

Pervak played in the first round of the main draw of the Australian Open for the first time in her career, but lost to 13th seed and fellow Russian Nadia Petrova.

Pervak made the semifinals of the $100k event in Midland, losing to eventual champion Lucie Hradecká. She made two consecutive quarterfinals of WTA Tour events in Memphis and Monterrey, losing to Hradecká and Gisela Dulko, respectively.

Pervak lost in qualifying at the Indian Wells Open to Jamie Hampton. However, she qualified for the Miami Open, defeating Zuzana Kučová and Junri Namigata. She lost in the fourth round of Wimbledon to Tamira Paszek, in three sets.

At the Baku Cup in July, she reached the final, losing to top seed Vera Zvonareva.

In September, Pervak defeated Eva Birnerová in the final at the Tashkent Open to win her first WTA Tour singles title.

=== 2013 ===
Pervak began her 2013 season at the Brisbane International. Coming through qualifying, she upset eighth seed Caroline Wozniacki in the first round. Her win over Wozniacki was her first victory over a top-ten player.

== Grand Slam tournament performance timelines ==
Key
W	F	SF	QF	#R	RR	Q#	DNQ	A	NH

(W) winner; (F) finalist; (SF) semifinalist; (QF) quarterfinalist; (#R) rounds 4, 3, 2, 1; (RR) round-robin stage; (Q#) qualification round; (DNQ) did not qualify; (A) absent; (NH) not held; (SR) strike rate (events won / competed); (W–L) win–loss record.

=== Singles ===
Tournament	2009	2010	2011	2012	2013	2014	2015	2016	2017	W–L
Australian Open	Q1	Q3	1R	1R	2R	A	A	A	Q1	1–3
French Open	A	1R	1R	1R	A	1R	A	A	A	0–4
Wimbledon	A	Q2	4R	1R	A	Q1	A	A	A	3–2
US Open	A	1R	1R	1R	Q3	1R	A	A	A	0–4
Win–Loss	0–0	0–2	3–4	0–4	1–1	0–2	0–0	0–0	0–0	4–13

=== Doubles ===
Tournament	2011	2012	2013	W–L
Australian Open	A	1R	2R	1–2
French Open	A	1R	A	0–1
Wimbledon	A	1R	A	0–1
US Open	1R	A	A	0–1
Win–Loss	0–1	0–3	1–1	1–5

== WTA Tour finals ==
=== Singles: 2 (1 title, 1 runner-up) ===
Legend International	Finals by surface Hard (1–1)

Result	W–L	Date	Tournament	Tier	Surface	Opponent	Score
Loss	0–1	Jul 2011	Baku Cup, Azerbaijan	International	Hard	(Russia) Vera Zvonareva	1–6, 4–6
Win	1–1	Sep 2011	Tashkent Open, Uzbekistan	International	Hard	(Czech Republic) Eva Birnerová	6–3, 6–1

=== Doubles: 1 (runner-up) ===
Legend International	Finals by surface Hard (0–1)

Result	Date	Tournament	Tier	Surface	Partner	Opponents	Score
Loss	Feb 2010	Pattaya Open, Thailand	International	Hard	(Russia) Anna Chakvetadze	(New Zealand) Marina Erakovic (Thailand) Tamarine Tanasugarn	5–7, 1–6

== ITF Circuit finals ==
=== Singles: 17 (9–8) ===
Legend $100,000 tournaments $50,000 tournaments $25,000 tournaments	Finals by surface Hard (4–2) Clay (5–5) Carpet (0–1)

Result	W–L	Date	Tournament	Tier	Surface	Opponent	Score
Win	1–0	Sep 2007	ITF Batumi, Georgia	25,000	Hard	(Italy) Corinna Dentoni	6–4, 6–3
Loss	1–1	May 2008	ITF Moscow, Russia	25,000	Clay	(Russia) Nina Bratchikova	6–3, 1–6, 5–7
Win	2–1	Aug 2008	ITF Penza, Russia	50,000	Clay	(Georgia (country)) Sofia Shapatava	6–4, 6–1
Win	3–1	Aug 2008	ITF Moscow, Russia	25,000	Clay	(Russia) Elena Kulikova	3–6, 6–3, 6–1
Loss	3–2	Sep 2008	ITF Ruse, Bulgaria	25,000	Clay	(Slovakia) Lenka Wienerová	4–6, 4–6
Loss	3–3	Oct 2008	ITF Podolsk, Russia	50,000	Carpet (i)	(Russia) Alisa Kleybanova	6–7^{(5)}, 0–6
Win	4–3	Aug 2009	ITF Moscow, Russia	25,000	Clay	(Russia) Ekaterina Ivanova	4–6, 6–4, 6–2
Win	5–3	Aug 2009	ITF Moscow, Russia	25,000	Clay	(Russia) Ekaterina Ivanova	6–0, 6–2
Loss	5–4	Aug 2009	ITF Katowice, Poland	25,000	Clay	(Italy) Camila Giorgi	2–6, 3–6
Loss	5–5	Sep 2009	Denain Open, France	50,000	Clay	(France) Stéphanie Cohen-Aloro	3–6, 4–6
Win	6–5	Sep 2009	ITF Helsinki, Finland	25,000	Hard (i)	(France) Stéphanie Foretz	6–4, 6–2
Win	7–5	Jun 2010	Bella Cup Toruń, Poland	25,000	Clay	(Poland) Magda Linette	6–4, 6–1
Loss	7–6	Jun 2011	Zlín Open, Сzech Republic	50,000	Clay	(Austria) Patricia Mayr-Achleitner	1–6, 0–6
Win	8–6	Oct 2013	ITF Istanbul, Turkey	25,000	Hard (i)	(Ukraine) Anhelina Kalinina	6–0, 7–5
Win	9–6	Nov 2013	ITF Istanbul, Turkey	50,000	Hard (i)	(Czech Republic) Eva Birnerová	6–4, 7–6^{(4)}
Loss	9–7	Feb 2014	Dow Midland Classic, US	100,000	Hard (i)	(United Kingdom) Heather Watson	4–6, 0–6
Loss	9–8	Jul 2015	President's Cup, Kazakhstan	25,000	Hard	(Russia) Natela Dzalamidze	6–6 ret.

=== Doubles: 4 (3–1) ===
Legend $50,000 tournaments $25,000 tournaments	Finals by surface Clay (1–1) Carpet (2–0)

Result	W–L	Date	Tournament	Tier	Surface	Partner	Opponents	Score
Win	1–0	8 September 2008	ITF Ruse, Bulgaria	25,000	Clay	(Russia) Alexandra Panova	(Russia) Vitalia Diatchenko (Russia) Eugeniya Pashkova	6–2, 6–7^{(5)}, [10–5]
Win	2–0	3 November 2008	Ismaning Open, Germany	50,000	Carpet (i)	(Ukraine) Oxana Lyubtsova	(Germany) Julia Görges (Germany) Laura Siegemund	6–2, 4–6, [10–7]
Win	6–0	30 March 2010	ITF Khanty-Mansiysk, Russia	50,000	Carpet (i)	(Russia) Alexandra Panova	(Ukraine) Lyudmyla Kichenok (Ukraine) Nadiia Kichenok	7–6^{(7)}, 2–6, [10–7]
Loss	3–1	31 May 2010	Maribor Open, Slovenia	50,000	Clay	(Russia) Alexandra Panova	(Slovenia) Andreja Klepač (Slovenia) Tadeja Majerič	3–6, 6–7^{(6)}

== Junior Grand Slam tournament finals ==
=== Singles: 1 (title) ===
Result	Year	Tournament	Surface	Opponent	Score
Win	2009	Australian Open	Hard	(United Kingdom) Laura Robson	6–3, 6–1
