= Eva Birnerová =

Czech tennis player

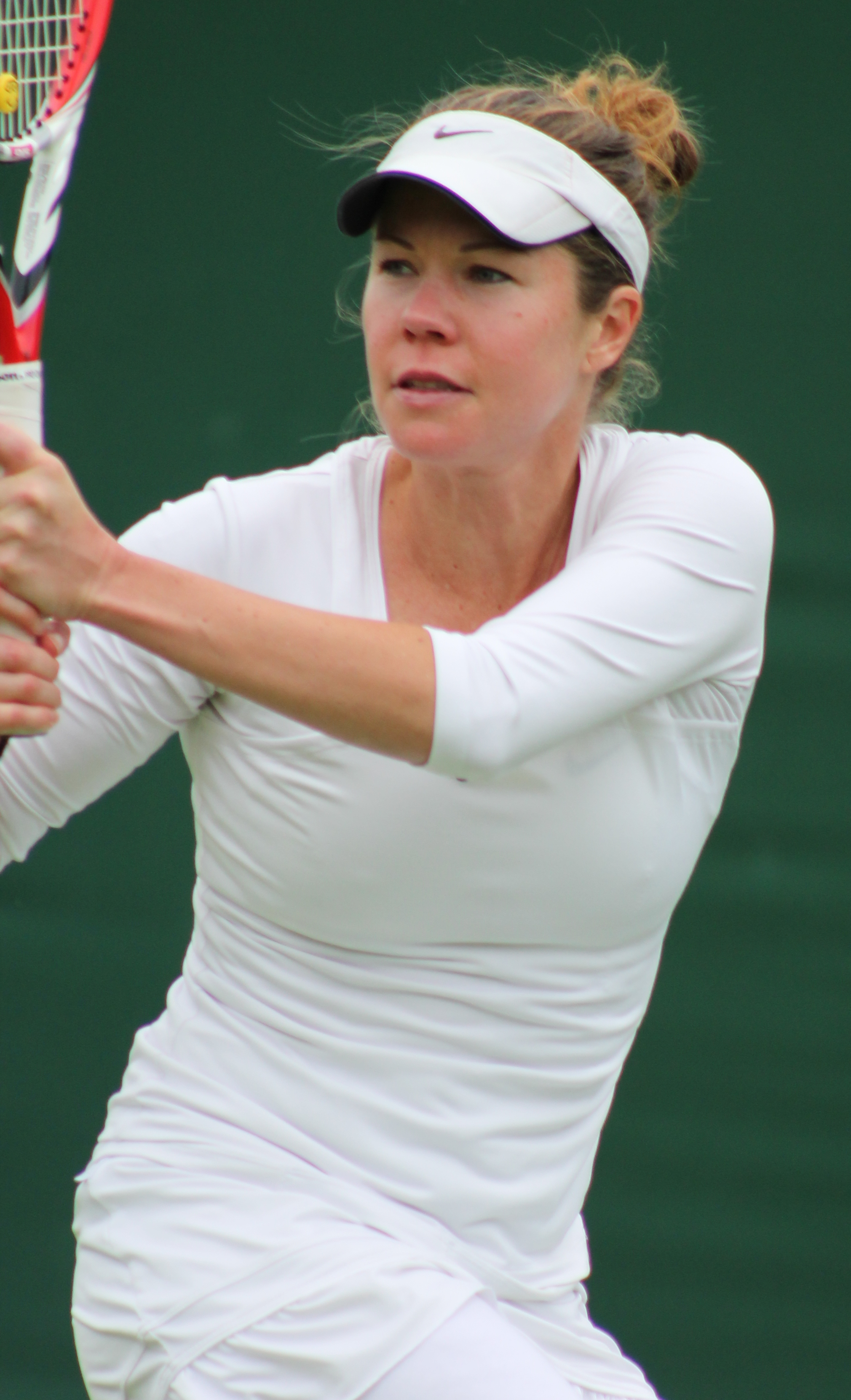
- Birnerová at the 2013 Wimbledon Championships
- Country (sports): Czech Republic
- Residence: Plzeň, Czech Republic
- Born: 14 August 1984 (age 42) Duchcov, Czechoslovakia
- Height: 1.70 m (5 ft 7 in)
- Turned pro: 2002
- Retired: 9 November 2018
- Plays: Right (two-handed backhand)
- Prize money: US$ 1,131,089

Singles
- Career record: 333–306
- Career titles: 8 ITF
- Highest ranking: No. 59 (29 January 2007)

Grand Slam singles results
- Australian Open: 3R (2007)
- French Open: 2R (2005)
- Wimbledon: 3R (2013)
- US Open: 2R (2006)

Doubles
- Career record: 183–199
- Career titles: 3 WTA, 11 ITF
- Highest ranking: No. 52 (21 May 2012)

Grand Slam doubles results
- Australian Open: 3R (2005)
- French Open: 3R (2005)
- Wimbledon: 1R (2004, 2005, 2006, 2012, 2013)
- US Open: 2R (2004, 2005, 2006, 2012)

Grand Slam mixed doubles results
- Wimbledon: 1R (2006)

Eva Birnerová (born 14 August 1984) is a Czech former tennis player.

During her career, she won three doubles titles on the WTA Tour, as well as eight singles and eleven doubles titles on the ITF Women's Circuit. On 29 January 2007, she reached her best singles ranking of world No. 59. On 21 May 2012, she peaked at No. 52 in the WTA doubles rankings.

Playing for the Czech Republic Fed Cup team, Birnerová reached a win–loss record of 0–2.

== Career ==
Birnerová was an all-court player who preferred playing on grass.

On the junior tour, she was the 2002 European Champion and number one in the combined world ranking of 18-under.

In 2006, Birnerová won her first WTA Tour doubles title in Stockholm, alongside Jarmila Gajdošová.

In 2011, she reached her first WTA Tour singles final in Tashkent, losing to top seed Ksenia Pervak in straight sets.

In 2012, she won her third career doubles title at the 2012 Copa Colsanitas, alongside Alexandra Panova.

== Performance timelines ==
Key
W	F	SF	QF	#R	RR	Q#	DNQ	A	NH

(W) winner; (F) finalist; (SF) semifinalist; (QF) quarterfinalist; (#R) rounds 4, 3, 2, 1; (RR) round-robin stage; (Q#) qualification round; (DNQ) did not qualify; (A) absent; (NH) not held; (SR) strike rate (events won / competed); (W–L) win–loss record.
To avoid confusion and double counting, these charts are updated at the conclusion of a tournament or when the player's participation has ended.

Only main-draw results in WTA Tour and Grand Slam tournaments, Fed Cup, Olympic Games and Hopman Cup are included in win–loss records.

=== Singles ===
Tournament	2002	2003	2004	2005	2006	2007	2008	2009	2010	2011	2012	2013	2014	SR	W–L	Win %
Grand Slam tournaments
Australian Open	A	A	1R	Q1	1R	3R	A	A	A	Q2	1R	Q1	Q1	0 / 4	2–4	33%
French Open	A	1R	1R	2R	1R	1R	A	A	A	Q1	1R	Q3	Q1	0 / 6	1–6	14%
Wimbledon	A	Q3	1R	1R	2R	1R	A	A	Q2	Q2	Q1	3R	Q1	0 / 5	3–5	38%
US Open	Q2	Q2	Q3	1R	2R	Q1	Q1	A	Q1	Q2	Q1	Q1	A	0 / 2	1–2	33%
Win–Loss	0–0	0–1	0–3	1–3	2–4	2–3	0–0	0–0	0–0	0–0	0–2	2–1	0–0	0 / 17	7–17	29%
WTA Premier Mandatory & 5 + former^{†} tournaments
Qatar Open	Not Tier I						A	Not Held		NTI	A	A	Q1	0 / 0	0–0	–
Dubai Championships	Not Tier I							A	A	A	Not Tier I			0 / 0	0–0	–
Indian Wells Open	A	A	1R	2R	Q2	1R	A	A	A	Q1	Q1	Q1	A	0 / 3	1–3	25%
Miami Open	A	A	Q1	A	Q1	A	A	A	A	Q2	1R	A	A	0 / 0	0–0	–
Italian Open	A	A	A	A	A	A	A	A	A	A	A	Q1	A	0 / 0	0–0	–
Canadian Open	A	A	A	A	A	Q1	A	A	A	A	A	A	A	0 / 0	0–0	–
Berlin Open^{†}	A	A	A	A	A	Q1	A	Not Held						0 / 0	0–0	–
Charleston Open^{†}	A	A	A	A	Q1	1R	A	Not Tier I						0 / 1	0–1	0%
Kremlin Cup^{†}	A	Q3	Q1	Q3	A	A	A	Not Tier I						0 / 0	0–0	–
Zurich Open^{†}	A	A	A	Q1	A	A	NTI	Not Held						0 / 0	0–0	–
Career statistics
Tournaments	0	3	7	7	9	14	0	0	0	5	9	6	0	Career total: 60		
Titles	0	0	0	0	0	0	0	0	0	0	0	0	0	Career total: 0		
Finals	0	0	0	0	0	0	0	0	0	1	0	0	0	Career total: 1		
Overall Win–Loss	0–0	0–3	2–7	5–7	6–9	5–14	0–0	0–0	0–0	7–5	5–9	2–6	0–0	0 / 60	32–60	35%

=== Doubles ===
Tournament	2004	2005	2006	2007	2011	2012	2013	SR	W–L	Win %
Australian Open	A	3R	1R	1R	A	2R	1R	0 / 5	3–5	38%
French Open	A	3R	1R	1R	A	1R	1R	0 / 5	2–5	29%
Wimbledon	1R	1R	1R	A	A	1R	1R	0 / 5	0–5	0%
US Open	2R	2R	2R	A	1R	2R	1R	0 / 6	4–6	40%
Win–Loss	1–2	5–4	1–4	0–2	0–1	2–4	0–4	0 / 21	9–21	30%

== WTA Tour finals ==
=== Singles: 1 (runner-up) ===
Legend International (0–1)	Finals by surface Hard (0–1)

Result	Date	Tournament	Tier	Surface	Opponent	Score
Loss	Sep 2011	Tashkent Open, Uzbekistan	International	Hard	(Russia) Ksenia Pervak	3–6, 1–6

=== Doubles: 9 (3 titles, 6 runner-ups) ===
Legend Tier IV / International (3–6)	Finals by surface Hard (1–4) Clay (2–2)

Result	W–L	Date	Tournament	Tier	Surface	Partner	Opponents	Score
Loss	0–1	Aug 2005	Nordic Light Open, Sweden	Tier IV	Hard	(Italy) Mara Santangelo	(France) Émilie Loit (Slovenia) Katarina Srebotnik	4–6, 3–6
Win	1–1	Aug 2006	Nordic Light Open, Sweden	Tier IV	Hard	(Slovakia) Jarmila Gajdošová	(China) Yan Zi (China) Zheng Jie	0–6, 6–4, 6–2
Loss	1–2	Sep 2006	Slovenia Open, Slovenia	Tier IV	Hard	(France) Émilie Loit	(Czech Republic) Lucie Hradecká (Czech Republic) Renata Voráčová	w/o
Win	2–2	Jul 2011	Austrian Open, Austria	International	Clay	(Czech Republic) Lucie Hradecká	(Germany) Julia Görges (Australia) Jarmila Gajdošová	4–6, 6–2, [12–10]
Win	3–2	Feb 2012	Copa Colsanitas, Colombia	International	Clay	(Russia) Alexandra Panova	(Luxembourg) Mandy Minella (Switzerland) Stefanie Vögele	6–2, 6–2
Loss	3–3	May 2012	Budapest Grand Prix, Hungary	International	Clay	(Netherlands) Michaëlla Krajicek	(Slovakia) Janette Husárová (Slovakia) Magdaléna Rybáriková	4–6, 2–6
Loss	3–4	Jul 2012	Baku Cup, Azerbaijan	International	Hard	(Italy) Alberta Brianti	(Ukraine) Irina Buryachok (Russia) Valeria Solovieva	3–6, 2–6
Loss	3–5	Feb 2013	Copa Colsanitas, Colombia	International	Clay	(Russia) Alexandra Panova	(Hungary) Tímea Babos (Luxembourg) Mandy Minella	4–6, 3–6
Loss	3–6	Apr 2013	Monterrey Open, Mexico	International	Hard	(Thailand) Tamarine Tanasugarn	(Hungary) Tímea Babos (Japan) Kimiko Date-Krumm	1–6, 4–6

== ITF Circuit finals ==
=== Singles: 13 (8 titles, 5 runner-ups) ===
Legend 75K tournaments 50K tournaments 25K tournaments	Finals by surface Hard (3–2) Clay (4–2) Carpet (1–1)

Result	W–L	Date	Tournament	Tier	Surface	Opponent	Score
Win	1–0	Sep 2001	GB Pro-Series Glasgow, UK	25K	Hard (i)	(France) Sophie Erre	3–6, 7–5, 6–4
Win	2–0	Feb 2002	ITF New Delhi, India	25K	Hard	(China) Peng Shuai	6–4, 7–5
Win	3–0	Jun 2002	ITF Lenzerheide, Switzerland	25K	Clay	(South Africa) Chanelle Scheepers	7–5, 6–4
Win	4–0	Apr 2003	ITF Dinan, France	50K	Clay (i)	(Czech Republic) Zuzana Ondrášková	1–6, 6–2, 6–3
Win	5–0	Jul 2003	ITF Vittel, France	50K	Clay	(Belarus) Tatiana Poutchek	6–4, 6–4
Win	6–0	Nov 2003	ITF Deauville, France	25K	Clay (i)	(France) Camille Pin	6–4, 6–3
Win	7–0	Feb 2006	ITF Ortisei, Italy	75K	Carpet (i)	(Poland) Marta Domachowska	4–6, 7–5, 6–2
Loss	7–1	Sep 2010	ITF Katowice, Poland	25K	Clay	(Poland) Magda Linette	6–3, 2–6, 2–6
Win	8–1	Sep 2010	GB Pro-Series Shrewsbury, UK	75K	Hard (i)	(Luxembourg) Anne Kremer	7–6^{(7–1)}, 3–6, 6–0
Loss	8–2	Jul 2011	ITS Cup, Czech Republic	50K	Clay	(Italy) Nastassja Burnett	1–6, 3–6
Loss	8–3	Oct 2012	Ismaning Open, Germany	75K	Carpet (i)	(Germany) Annika Beck	3–6, 6–7^{(8–10)}
Loss	8–4	Nov 2013	ITF Istanbul, Turkey	50K	Hard (i)	(Russia) Ksenia Pervak	4–6, 6–7^{(4–7)}
Loss	8–5	Dec 2013	ITF Madrid, Spain	25K	Hard	(France) Amandine Hesse	6–4, 0–6, 2–6

=== Doubles: 19 (11 titles, 8 runner-ups) ===
Legend 100K tournaments 75K tournaments 50K tournaments 25K tournaments 10K tournaments	Finals by surface Hard (2–2) Clay (6–6) Grass (1–0) Carpet (2–0)

Result	W–L	Date	Tournament	Tier	Surface	Partner	Opponents	Score
Win	1–0	Oct 1998	ITF Nicosia, Cyprus	10K	Clay	(Germany) Annette Zweck	(Lithuania) Galina Misiuriova (Estonia) Liina Suurvarik	6–3, 6–4
Win	2–0	Oct 2000	ITF Minsk, Belarus	10K	Carpet (i)	(Russia) Alexandra Zerkalova	(Russia) Raissa Gourevitch (Armenia) Liudmila Nikoyan	2–4, 3–5, 5–3, 4–2, 4–0
Loss	2–1	Feb 2002	ITF New Delhi, India	25K	Hard	(Czech Republic) Jana Hlaváčková	(South Korea) Choi Young-ja (South Korea) Kim Eun-ha	7–6^{(7–4)}, 4–6, 3–6
Loss	2–2	Jul 2002	ITF Darmstadt, Germany	25K	Clay	(Czech Republic) Dominika Luzarová	(Germany) Kirstin Freye (Germany) Andrea Glass	5–7, 2–6
Win	3–2	Sep 2002	ITF Tbilisi, Georgia	25K	Clay	(Czech Republic) Gabriela Chmelinová	(Russia) Goulnara Fattakhetdinova (Russia) Maria Kondratieva	6–4, 6–0
Loss	3–3	Jul 2003	ITF Vittel, France	50K	Clay	(Czech Republic) Libuše Průšová	(Ukraine) Yuliya Beygelzimer (Belarus) Tatiana Poutchek	3–6, 2–6
Win	4–3	Apr 2004	Open de Cagnes-sur-Mer, France	75k	Clay	(Bulgaria) Lubomira Bacheva	(Romania) Ruxandra Dragomir (Germany) Antonia Matic	4–6, 7–6^{(7–4)}, 6–3
Loss	4–4	Jul 2004	ITF Modena, Italy	75K	Clay	(Bulgaria) Lubomira Bacheva	(Czech Republic) Gabriela Chmelinová (Czech Republic) Michaela Paštiková	2–6, 3–6
Win	5–4	Oct 2008	Open Saint-Raphaël, France	50K	Hard (i)	(Czech Republic) Lucie Hradecká	(France) Gracia Radovanovic (Czech Republic) Renata Voráčová	6–4, 6–3
Win	6–4	Apr 2010	ITF Cairo, Egypt	25K	Clay	(Czech Republic) Renata Voráčová	(Belarus) Ksenia Milevskaya (Slovakia) Lenka Wienerová	7–6^{(7–4)}, 6–4
Win	7–4	Jun 2010	ITF Zlín, Czech Republic	50K	Clay	(France) Stéphanie Foretz Gacon	(Czech Republic) Tereza Hladíková (Slovakia) Michaela Pochabová	7–5, 4–6, 6–4
Win	8–4	Jun 2010	ITF Cuneo, Italy	100K	Clay	(Czech Republic) Lucie Hradecká	(Romania) Sorana Cîrstea (Slovenia) Andreja Klepač	3–6, 6–4, [10–8]
Loss	8–5	Sep 2010	Save Cup, Italy	50K	Clay	(Slovenia) Andreja Klepač	(Italy) Claudia Giovine (Italy) Karin Knapp	7–6^{(8–6)}, 5–7, [11–13]
Loss	8–6	Oct 2010	ITF Jounieh Open, Lebanon	100K	Clay	(Slovenia) Andreja Klepač	(Czech Republic) Petra Cetkovská (Czech Republic) Renata Voráčová	5–7, 2–6
Win	9–6	Jun 2011	Nottingham Trophy, UK	100K	Grass	(Czech Republic) Petra Cetkovská	(Russia) Regina Kulikova (Russia) Evgeniya Rodina	6–3, 6–2
Loss	9–7	Jun 2011	ITF Cuneo, Italy	100K	Clay	(Russia) Vesna Dolonc	(Luxembourg) Mandy Minella (Switzerland) Stefanie Vögele	3–6, 2–6
Win	10–7	Oct 2011	GB Pro-Series Barnstaple, UK	75K	Hard (i)	(United Kingdom) Anne Keothavong	(Austria) Sandra Klemenschits (Germany) Tatjana Malek	7–5, 6–1
Loss	10–8	Mar 2012	The Bahamas Open, UK	100K	Hard	(United Kingdom) Anne Keothavong	(Slovakia) Janette Husárová (Hungary) Katalin Marosi	1–6, 6–3, [6–10]
Win	11–8	Feb 2014	ITF Kreuzlingen, Switzerland	25K	Carpet (i)	(Netherlands) Michaëlla Krajicek	(Serbia) Aleksandra Krunić (Switzerland) Amra Sadiković	6–1, 4–6, [10–6]
