= Alina Abdurakhimova =

Uzbekistani tennis player

- Country (sports): Uzbekistan
- Born: 23 March 1995 (age 30); Tashkent, Uzbekistan
- Height: 5 ft 8 in (173 cm)
- Plays: Right-handed
- Prize money: $9,940

Singles
- Career record: 15–36
- Highest ranking: No. 830 (29 Apr 2013)

Doubles
- Career record: 4–19
- Highest ranking: No. 869 (29 Dec 2014)

Alina Abdurakhimova (born 23 March 1995) is an Uzbekistani former professional tennis player.

A Tashkent native, Abdurakhimova competed as a wildcard in the main draw of the 2010 Tashkent Open and featured in the qualifying draw of her home tournament a further three times.

In 2014 she played a doubles rubber for the Uzbekistan Fed Cup team, against South Korea in Astana, Kazakhstan.

Abdurakhimova was a collegiate tennis player for Temple University between 2014 and 2018.
