= 2012 Tatarstan Open – Singles =

Singles
- 2012 Tatarstan Open

Final
- Champion: (Ukraine) Kateryna Kozlova
- Runner-up: (United Kingdom) Tara Moore
- Score: 6–3, 6–3

Events
Singles	Doubles
← 2011 ·	Tatarstan Open	· 2013 →

Yulia Putintseva was the defending champion, but chose not to participate.

Kateryna Kozlova won the title defeating Tara Moore in the final 6–3, 6–3.

== Seeds ==
1. (Russia) Nina Bratchikova (first round)
2. (Romania) Mădălina Gojnea (second round)
3. (Russia) Valeria Solovieva (first round)
4. (Ukraine) Valentyna Ivakhnenko (semifinals)
5. (Russia) Daria Gavrilova (first round)
6. (Ukraine) Lyudmyla Kichenok (quarterfinals)
7. (Romania) Raluca Olaru (second round)
8. (Russia) Margarita Gasparyan (second round)

== Draw ==
=== Key ===
- Q = Qualifier
- WC = Wild card
- LL = Lucky loser
- Alt = Alternate
- SE = Special exempt
- PR = Protected ranking
- ITF = ITF entry
- JE = Junior exempt
- w/o = Walkover
- r = Retired
- d = Defaulted
- SR = Special ranking

=== Finals ===
Semifinals
(Ukraine) Kateryna Kozlova	6	7^{7}
4	(Ukraine) Valentyna Ivakhnenko	3	6^{5}
(United Kingdom) Tara Moore	5	7	6
(Slovenia) Tadeja Majerič	7	5	4

Final
(Ukraine) Kateryna Kozlova	6	6
(United Kingdom) Tara Moore	3	3

=== Top half ===
First round
1	(Russia) N Bratchikova	4	2
(Turkey) P Özgen	6	6
Q	(Russia) J Valetova	1	6	1
Q	(Uzbekistan) N Abduraimova	6	4	6
(Russia) M Melnikova	6	2	6^{3}
(Ukraine) K Kozlova	4	6	7^{7}
(Ukraine) N Kichenok	2	1
8	(Russia) M Gasparyan	6	6
4	(Ukraine) V Ivakhnenko	6	6
(Lithuania) L Stančiūtė	2	3
WC	(Russia) E Yashina	1	1
(Russia) A Artamonova	6	6
(Thailand) V Wongteanchai	6	6
Q	(Russia) M Shamayko	3	4
(United Kingdom) M South	5	4
6	(Ukraine) L Kichenok	7	6

Second round
(Turkey) P Özgen	4	3
Q	(Uzbekistan) N Abduraimova	6	6
(Ukraine) K Kozlova	7	6
8	(Russia) M Gasparyan	5	2
4	(Ukraine) V Ivakhnenko	6	6
(Russia) A Artamonova	0	4
(Thailand) V Wongteanchai	0	6	4
6	(Ukraine) L Kichenok	6	3	6

Quarterfinals
Q	(Uzbekistan) N Abduraimova	1	3
(Ukraine) K Kozlova	6	6
4	(Ukraine) V Ivakhnenko	6	6
6	(Ukraine) L Kichenok	3	4

Semifinals
(Ukraine) K Kozlova	6	7^{7}
4	(Ukraine) V Ivakhnenko	3	6^{5}

=== Bottom half ===
First round
5	(Russia) D Gavrilova	6^{3}	6	5
(Russia) A Rodionova	7^{7}	3	7
Q	(Russia) M Katsitadze	2	6	6
WC	(Russia) E Kulichkova	6	4	2
(Russia) K Lykina	6	6
WC	(Russia) P Novoselova	0	2
(United Kingdom) T Moore	6	6
3	(Russia) V Solovieva	3	2
7	(Romania) R Olaru	6	7
WC	(Russia) A Romanova	1	5
(Ukraine) E Ianchuk	3	1
(Slovenia) T Majerič	6	6
(Ukraine) A Vasylyeva	1	1
(Belarus) I Kremen	6	6
SR	(Kyrgyzstan) K Palkina	5	6	3
2	(Romania) M Gojnea	7	4	6

Second round
(Russia) A Rodionova	6^{9}	3
Q	(Russia) M Katsitadze	7^{11}	6
(Russia) K Lykina	3	3
(United Kingdom) T Moore	6	6
7	(Romania) R Olaru	3	4
(Slovenia) T Majerič	6	6
(Belarus) I Kremen	7	1	6
2	(Romania) M Gojnea	5	6	1

Quarterfinals
Q	(Russia) M Katsitadze	5	2
(United Kingdom) T Moore	7	6
(Slovenia) T Majerič	0	6	7
(Belarus) I Kremen	6	4	5

Semifinals
(United Kingdom) T Moore	5	7	6
(Slovenia) T Majerič	7	5	3
