= 2011 President's Cup (tennis) =

Professional tennis tournament

- Date: 25–31 July
- Edition: 5th (men); 3rd (women)
- Surface: Hard
- Location: Astana, Kazakhstan

Champions

Men's singles
- (Kazakhstan) Mikhail Kukushkin

Women's singles
- (Russia) Vitalia Diatchenko

Men's doubles
- (Russia) Konstantin Kravchuk / (Ukraine) Denys Molchanov

Women's doubles
- (Russia) Vitalia Diatchenko / (Kazakhstan) Galina Voskoboeva
- President's Cup (tennis)

The 2011 President's Cup was a professional tennis tournament played on hard courts. It was the fifth edition of the tournament which was part of the 2011 ATP Challenger Tour and the third edition for the 2011 ITF Women's Circuit. It took place in Astana, Kazakhstan between 25 and 31 July 2011.

== ATP entrants ==
=== Seeds ===
Country	Player	Rank^{1}	Seed
KAZ	Andrey Golubev	46	1
KAZ	Mikhail Kukushkin	67	2
ISR	Dudi Sela	79	3
SVK	Karol Beck	98	4
SVK	Lukáš Lacko	144	5
RUS	Konstantin Kravchuk	147	6
ESP	Arnau Brugués Davi	213	7
RUS	Denis Matsukevich	237	8

- ^{1} Rankings are as of July 18, 2011.

=== Other entrants ===
The following players received wildcards into the singles main draw:

- (Kazakhstan) Andrey Golubev
- (Uzbekistan) Vaja Uzakov
- (Kazakhstan) Serizhan Yessenbekov
- (Kazakhstan) Denis Yevseyev

The following players received entry from the qualifying draw:

- (Kazakhstan) Danjil Braun
- (Russia) Sergei Krotiouk
- (Kazakhstan) Dmitriy Makeyev
- (Germany) Lars Übel

== WTA entrants ==
=== Seeds ===
Country	Player	Rank^{1}	Seed
~~RUS~~	~~Ksenia Pervak~~	~~55~~	~~1~~
RUS	Evgeniya Rodina	78	2
NED	Arantxa Rus	81	3
BLR	Anastasiya Yakimova	88	4
RUS	Vesna Dolonts	91	5
UZB	Akgul Amanmuradova	97	6
UKR	Lesia Tsurenko	128	7
JPN	Junri Namigata	135	8

- ^{1} Rankings are as of July 18, 2011.

=== Other entrants ===
The following players received wildcards into the singles main draw:

- (Kazakhstan) Aselya Arginbayeva
- (Russia) Ekaterina Klyueva
- (Russia) Yulia Putintseva
- (Kazakhstan) Anastasiya Yepisheva

The following players received entry from the qualifying draw:

- (Russia) Yana Buchina
- (Ukraine) Yuliya Lysa
- (Belarus) Polina Pekhova
- (Russia) Maria Zharkova

The following players received entry by a lucky loser spot:

- (India) Prerna Bhambri
- (Russia) Ekaterina Yashina

== Champions ==
=== Men's singles ===
(Kazakhstan) Mikhail Kukushkin def. (Ukraine) Sergei Bubka, 6–3, 6–4

=== Women's singles ===
(Russia) Vitalia Diatchenko def. (Uzbekistan) Akgul Amanmuradova, 6–4, 6–1

=== Men's doubles ===
(Russia) Konstantin Kravchuk / (Ukraine) Denys Molchanov def. (Spain) Arnau Brugués Davi / (Tunisia) Malek Jaziri, 7–6^{(7–4)}, 6–7^{(1–7)}, [10–3]

=== Women's doubles ===
(Russia) Vitalia Diatchenko / (Kazakhstan) Galina Voskoboeva def. (Uzbekistan) Akgul Amanmuradova / (Russia) Alexandra Panova, 6–3, 6–4
