= 2012 Tatarstan Open – Doubles =

Doubles
- 2012 Tatarstan Open

Final
- Champions: (Ukraine) Valentyna Ivakhnenko (Ukraine) Kateryna Kozlova
- Runners-up: (Ukraine) Lyudmyla Kichenok (Ukraine) Nadiya Kichenok
- Score: 6–4, 6–7^{(6–8)}, [10–4]

Events
Singles	Doubles
← 2011 ·	Tatarstan Open	· 2013 →

Ekaterina Ivanova and Andreja Klepač were the defending champions, but neither chose to participate.

In an all-Ukrainian final, the number two seeds, Valentyna Ivakhnenko and Kateryna Kozlova, defeated the top seeds, Lyudmyla Kichenok and Nadiya Kichenok to take the title, 6–4, 6–7^{(6–8)}, [10–4].

== Seeds ==
1. (Ukraine) Lyudmyla Kichenok / (Ukraine) Nadiya Kichenok (final)
2. (Ukraine) Valentyna Ivakhnenko / (Ukraine) Kateryna Kozlova (champions)
3. (Russia) Arina Rodionova / (United Kingdom) Melanie South (first round)
4. (Thailand) Varatchaya Wongteanchai / (Thailand) Varunya Wongteanchai (first round)

== Draw ==
=== Key ===
- Q = Qualifier
- WC = Wild card
- LL = Lucky loser
- Alt = Alternate
- SE = Special exempt
- PR = Protected ranking
- ITF = ITF entry
- JE = Junior exempt
- w/o = Walkover
- r = Retired
- d = Defaulted
- SR = Special ranking

=== Draw ===
First round
1	(Ukraine) L Kichenok (Ukraine) N Kichenok	7^{7}	6
(United Kingdom) T Moore (Kyrgyzstan) K Palkina	6^{5}	4
WC	(Russia) M Gasparyan (Russia) V Kudermetova	5	6	[7]
(Russia) M Melnikova (Russia) M Shamayko	7	1	[10]
3	(Russia) A Rodionova (United Kingdom) M South	7	2	[9]
(Uzbekistan) N Abduraimova (Russia) K Lykina	5	6	[11]
WC	(Uzbekistan) V Ekshibarova (Russia) P Novoselova	2	4
Alt	(Ukraine) E Ianchuk (Belarus) S Pirazhenka	6	6
(Slovenia) T Majerič (Ukraine) A Sotnikova	6	6
(Russia) M Lazareva (Russia) E Yashina	0	3
(Belarus) I Kremen (Belarus) L Marozava	7^{7}	6^{4}	[10]
4	(Thailand) Vara Wongteanchai (Thailand) Varu Wongteanchai	6^{5}	7^{7}	[8]
(Turkey) P Özgen (Lithuania) L Stančiūtė	4	3
(Romania) M Gojnea (Romania) R Olaru	6	6
(Russia) E Pashkova (Ukraine) A Vasylyeva	2	3
2	(Ukraine) V Ivakhnenko (Ukraine) K Kozlova	6	6

Quarterfinals
1	(Ukraine) L Kichenok (Ukraine) N Kichenok	7^{9}	4	[10]
(Russia) M Melnikova (Russia) M Shamayko	6^{7}	6	[3]
(Uzbekistan) N Abduraimova (Russia) K Lykina	5	4
Alt	(Ukraine) E Ianchuk (Belarus) S Pirazhenka	7	6
(Slovenia) T Majerič (Ukraine) A Sotnikova	2	5
(Belarus) I Kremen (Belarus) L Marozava	6	7
(Romania) M Gojnea (Romania) R Olaru	6	2	[5]
2	(Ukraine) V Ivakhnenko (Ukraine) K Kozlova	1	6	[10]

Semifinals
1	(Ukraine) L Kichenok (Ukraine) N Kichenok	6	3	[10]
Alt	(Ukraine) E Ianchuk (Belarus) S Pirazhenka	2	6	[5]
(Belarus) I Kremen (Belarus) L Marozava	2	6	[6]
2	(Ukraine) V Ivakhnenko (Ukraine) K Kozlova	6	4	[10]

Finals
1	(Ukraine) L Kichenok (Ukraine) N Kichenok	4	7^{8}	[4]
2	(Ukraine) V Ivakhnenko (Ukraine) K Kozlova	6	6^{6}	[10]
