= 2013 Tatarstan Open =

- Date: 26 August–1 September
- Edition: 4th
- Draw: 32S/16D
- Prize money: $50,000+H
- Surface: Hard
- Location: Kazan, Russia

Champions

Singles
- (Germany) Anna-Lena Friedsam

Doubles
- (Ukraine) Valentyna Ivakhnenko / (Ukraine) Kateryna Kozlova
- Tatarstan Open

The 2013 Tatarstan Open was a professional tennis tournament played on outdoor hard courts. It was the fourth edition of the tournament which was part of the 2013 ITF Women's Circuit, offering a total of $50,000+H in prize money. It took place in Kazan, Russia, on 26 August–1 September 2013.

== WTA entrants ==
=== Seeds ===
Country	Player	Rank^{1}	Seed
UKR	Nadiya Kichenok	121	1
POL	Magda Linette	158	2
RUS	Marta Sirotkina	187	3
GER	Anna-Lena Friedsam	196	4
UKR	Lyudmyla Kichenok	216	5
RUS	Arina Rodionova	220	6
BLR	Ilona Kremen	223	7
UKR	Kateryna Kozlova	234	8

- ^{1} Rankings as of 19 August 2013

=== Other entrants ===
The following players received wildcards into the singles main draw:

- (Russia) Elizaveta Kulichkova
- (Russia) Polina Novoselova
- (Russia) Evgeniya Rodina
- (Russia) Sabina Shaydullina

The following players received entry from the qualifying draw:

- (Russia) Ekaterina Alexandrova
- (Russia) Anastasia Frolova
- (Russia) Anastasiya Saitova
- (Ukraine) Anastasiya Vasylyeva

== Champions ==
=== Singles ===
- (Germany) Anna-Lena Friedsam def. (Russia) Marta Sirotkina 6–2, 6–3

=== Doubles ===
- (Ukraine) Valentyna Ivakhnenko / (Ukraine) Kateryna Kozlova def. (Turkey) Başak Eraydın / (Ukraine) Veronika Kapshay 6–4, 6–1
