= 2012 Tatarstan Open =

- Date: 13–19 August
- Edition: 3rd
- Surface: Hard
- Location: Kazan, Russia

Champions

Singles
- (Ukraine) Kateryna Kozlova

Doubles
- (Ukraine) Valentyna Ivakhnenko / (Ukraine) Kateryna Kozlova
- Tatarstan Open

The 2012 Tatarstan Open was a professional tennis tournament played on hard courts. It was the third edition of the tournament and was part of the 2012 ITF Women's Circuit. It took place in Kazan, Russia between 13 and 19 August 2012.

== WTA entrants ==
=== Seeds ===
Country	Player	Rank^{1}	Seed
RUS	Nina Bratchikova	88	1
ROU	Mădălina Gojnea	197	2
RUS	Valeria Solovieva	212	3
UKR	Valentyna Ivakhnenko	229	4
RUS	Daria Gavrilova	235	5
UKR	Lyudmyla Kichenok	255	6
ROU	Raluca Olaru	267	7
RUS	Margarita Gasparyan	280	8

- ^{1} Rankings are as of August 6, 2012.

=== Other entrants ===
The following players received wildcards into the singles main draw:

- (Russia) Elizaveta Kulichkova
- (Russia) Polina Novoselova
- (Russia) Alexandra Romanova
- (Russia) Ekaterina Yashina

The following players received entry from the qualifying draw:

- (Uzbekistan) Nigina Abduraimova
- (Russia) Mayya Katsitadze
- (Russia) Marina Shamayko
- (Russia) Julia Valetova

The following player received entry from a Special Ranking spot:

- (Kyrgyzstan) Ksenia Palkina

== Champions ==
=== Singles ===
- (Ukraine) Kateryna Kozlova def. (United Kingdom) Tara Moore, 6–3, 6–3

=== Doubles ===
- (Ukraine) Valentyna Ivakhnenko / (Ukraine) Kateryna Kozlova def. (Ukraine) Lyudmyla Kichenok / (Ukraine) Nadiia Kichenok, 6–4, 6–7^{(6–8)}, [10–4]
