= 2011 President's Cup – Men's doubles =

Men's doubles
- 2011 President's Cup (tennis)

Final
- Champions: (Russia) Konstantin Kravchuk (Ukraine) Denys Molchanov
- Runners-up: (Spain) Arnau Brugués-Davi (Tunisia) Malek Jaziri
- Score: 7–6^{(7–4)}, 6–7^{(1–7)}, [10–3]

Events
Singles	men	women
Doubles	men	women
- President's Cup (tennis)

Colin Fleming and Ross Hutchins were the defending champions, but decided not to participate.

Konstantin Kravchuk and Denys Molchanov won the title, defeating Arnau Brugués-Davi and Malek Jaziri 7–6^{(7–4)}, 6–7^{(1–7)}, [10–3] in the final.

== Seeds ==
1. (Kazakhstan) Mikhail Kukushkin / (Russia) Vitali Reshetnikov (quarterfinals)
2. (Russia) Konstantin Kravchuk / (Ukraine) Denys Molchanov (champions)
3. (Slovakia) Karol Beck / (Slovakia) Lukáš Lacko (semifinals)
4. (Belarus) Sergey Betov / (India) Vishnu Vardhan (quarterfinals)

== Draw ==
Key

- Q = Qualifier
- WC = Wild card
- LL = Lucky loser
- Alt = Alternate
- ITF = ITF entry
- PR = Protected ranking
- SR = Special ranking
- SE = Special exempt
- JE = Junior exempt
- JR = Junior Accelerator Programme entrant
- CO = College Accelerator Programme entrant
- NG = Next Gen Accelerator Program entrant
- w/o = Walkover
- r = Retired
- d = Defaulted

=== Draw ===
First round
1	(Kazakhstan) M Kukushkin (Russia) Vitali Reshetnikov	6	5	[13]
(Uzbekistan) F Dustov (Russia) Mikhail Vasiliev	3	7	[11]
(Kazakhstan) Danjil Braun (Kazakhstan) Kairat Kosherov	0	3
(Spain) A Brugués-Davi (Tunisia) M Jaziri	6	6
3	(Slovakia) K Beck (Slovakia) L Lacko	6	6
(Kazakhstan) Serizhan Yessenbekov (Kazakhstan) D Yevseyev	2	1
(Russia) Ervand Gasparyan (Russia) Alexander Lobkov	3	3
(Uzbekistan) M Inoyatov (Russia) Sergei Krotiouk	6	6
(Switzerland) M Chiudinelli (Germany) Lars Übel	3	7^{7}	[10]
(Russia) D Matsukevich (Czech Republic) J Mertl	6	6^{3}	[2]
(Kazakhstan) A Kedryuk (Kazakhstan) Dmitriy Makeyev	6^{3}	2
4	(Belarus) S Betov (India) V Vardhan	7^{7}	6
(Russia) N Basilashvili (Russia) Illia Chkonia	2	5
(Ukraine) S Bubka (Monaco) J-R Lisnard	6	7
WC	(Kazakhstan) Aidynbek Rakhishev (Uzbekistan) V Uzakov	0	1
2	(Russia) K Kravchuk (Ukraine) D Molchanov	6	6

Quarterfinals
1	(Kazakhstan) M Kukushkin (Russia) Vitali Reshetnikov	3	2
(Spain) A Brugués-Davi (Tunisia) M Jaziri	6	6
3	(Slovakia) K Beck (Slovakia) L Lacko	1	6	[10]
(Uzbekistan) M Inoyatov (Russia) Sergei Krotiouk	6	3	[8]
(Switzerland) M Chiudinelli (Germany) Lars Übel	7^{7}	6
4	(Belarus) S Betov (India) V Vardhan	6^{5}	4
(Ukraine) S Bubka (Monaco) J-R Lisnard	5	5
2	(Russia) K Kravchuk (Ukraine) D Molchanov	7	7

Semifinals
(Spain) A Brugués-Davi (Tunisia) M Jaziri	6	6
3	(Slovakia) K Beck (Slovakia) L Lacko	2	3
(Switzerland) M Chiudinelli (Germany) Lars Übel	2	3
2	(Russia) K Kravchuk (Ukraine) D Molchanov	6	6

Final
(Spain) A Brugués-Davi (Tunisia) M Jaziri	6^{4}	7^{7}	[3]
2	(Russia) K Kravchuk (Ukraine) D Molchanov	7^{7}	6^{1}	[10]
