= 2013 Tatarstan Open – Doubles =

Doubles
- 2013 Tatarstan Open

Final
- Champions: (Ukraine) Valentyna Ivakhnenko (Ukraine) Kateryna Kozlova
- Runners-up: (Turkey) Başak Eraydın (Ukraine) Veronika Kapshay
- Score: 6–4, 6–1

Events
Singles	Doubles
← 2012 ·	Tatarstan Open	· 2014 →

Valentyna Ivakhnenko and Kateryna Kozlova were the defending champions, having won the event in 2012. The Ukrainian pair managed to defend their title by defeating Başak Eraydın and Veronika Kapshay in the final, 6–4, 6–1.

== Seeds ==
1. (Ukraine) Lyudmyla Kichenok / (Ukraine) Nadiya Kichenok (first round)
2. (Thailand) Noppawan Lertcheewakarn / (Russia) Arina Rodionova (semifinals)
3. (Belarus) Ilona Kremen / (Belarus) Aliaksandra Sasnovich (quarterfinals)
4. (Russia) Marina Melnikova / (Kyrgyzstan) Ksenia Palkina (quarterfinals)

== Draw ==
=== Key ===
- Q = Qualifier
- WC = Wild card
- LL = Lucky loser
- Alt = Alternate
- SE = Special exempt
- PR = Protected ranking
- ITF = ITF entry
- JE = Junior exempt
- w/o = Walkover
- r = Retired
- d = Defaulted
- SR = Special ranking

First round
1	(Ukraine) L Kichenok (Ukraine) N Kichenok	3	1
(Norway) U Eikeri (Brazil) L Pigossi	6	6
(Russia) M Gasparyan (Russia) E Pashkova	3	5
(Ukraine) V Ivakhnenko (Ukraine) K Kozlova	6	7
4	(Russia) M Melnikova (Kyrgyzstan) K Palkina	7^{7}	1	[10]
(Germany) A-L Friedsam (Poland) M Linette	6^{5}	6	[5]
(Russia) Y Kalabina (Georgia (country)) S Shapatava	1	3
(Uzbekistan) A Khabibulina (Ukraine) A Vasylyeva	6	6
(Russia) O Doroshina (Russia) P Monova	7	2	[6]
(Turkey) B Eraydın (Ukraine) V Kapshay	5	6	[10]
WC	(Russia) A Kalimullina (Russia) R Kalimullina	6^{1}	0
3	(Belarus) I Kremen (Belarus) A Sasnovich	7^{7}	6
(Czech Republic) M Borecká (Russia) M Shamayko	0	3
WC	(Russia) E Kulichkova (Russia) E Rodina	6	6
WC	(Russia) P Novoselova (Russia) S Shaydullina	0	2
2	(Thailand) N Lertcheewakarn (Russia) A Rodionova	6	6

Quarterfinals
(Norway) U Eikeri (Brazil) L Pigossi	3	4
(Ukraine) V Ivakhnenko (Ukraine) K Kozlova	6	6
4	(Russia) M Melnikova (Kyrgyzstan) K Palkina	3	4
(Uzbekistan) A Khabibulina (Ukraine) A Vasylyeva	6	6
(Turkey) B Eraydın (Ukraine) V Kapshay	6	3	[10]
3	(Belarus) I Kremen (Belarus) A Sasnovich	1	6	[8]
WC	(Russia) E Kulichkova (Russia) E Rodina	2	2
2	(Thailand) N Lertcheewakarn (Russia) A Rodionova	6	6

Semifinals
(Ukraine) V Ivakhnenko (Ukraine) K Kozlova	5	6	[10]
(Uzbekistan) A Khabibulina (Ukraine) A Vasylyeva	7	1	[4]
(Turkey) B Eraydın (Ukraine) V Kapshay	7^{9}	6
2	(Thailand) N Lertcheewakarn (Russia) A Rodionova	6^{7}	4

Final
(Ukraine) V Ivakhnenko (Ukraine) K Kozlova	6	6
(Turkey) B Eraydın (Ukraine) V Kapshay	4	1
