= 2013 Tatarstan Open – Singles =

Singles
- 2013 Tatarstan Open

Final
- Champion: (Germany) Anna-Lena Friedsam
- Runner-up: (Russia) Marta Sirotkina
- Score: 6–2, 6–3

Events
Singles	Doubles
← 2012 ·	Tatarstan Open	· 2014 →

Kateryna Kozlova was the defending champion, having won the event in 2012, but lost in the semifinals to Marta Sirotkina.

Anna-Lena Friedsam won the tournament, defeating Sirotkina in the final, 6–2, 6–3.

== Seeds ==
1. (Ukraine) Nadiya Kichenok (semifinals)
2. (Poland) Magda Linette (second round)
3. (Russia) Marta Sirotkina (final)
4. (Germany) Anna-Lena Friedsam (champion)
5. (Ukraine) Lyudmyla Kichenok (quarterfinals)
6. (Russia) Arina Rodionova (second round)
7. (Belarus) Ilona Kremen (first round)
8. (Ukraine) Kateryna Kozlova (semifinals)

== Main draw ==
=== Key ===
- Q = Qualifier
- WC = Wild card
- LL = Lucky loser
- Alt = Alternate
- SE = Special exempt
- PR = Protected ranking
- ITF = ITF entry
- JE = Junior exempt
- w/o = Walkover
- r = Retired
- d = Defaulted
- SR = Special ranking

=== Finals ===
Semifinals
1	(Ukraine) Nadiya Kichenok	3	2
4	(Germany) Anna-Lena Friedsam	6	6
3	(Russia) Marta Sirotkina	6	6
8	(Ukraine) Kateryna Kozlova	4	4

Final
4	(Germany) Anna-Lena Friedsam	6	6
3	(Russia) Marta Sirotkina	2	3

=== Top half ===
First round
1	(Ukraine) N Kichenok	7	6
WC	(Russia) S Shaydullina	5	2
(Thailand) N Luangnam	3	1
(Russia) M Gasparyan	6	6
(Czech Republic) T Martincová	6	6
WC	(Russia) P Novoselova	4	4
Q	(Russia) E Alexandrova	7^{9}	6
7	(Belarus) I Kremen	6^{7}	4
4	(Germany) A-L Friedsam	6	6
Q	(Russia) A Saitova	0	4
(Russia) P Vinogradova	2	6^{5}
(Russia) Y Kalabina	6	7^{7}
Q	(Ukraine) A Vasylyeva	3	0
(Thailand) N Lertcheewakarn	6	6
(Turkey) B Eraydın	2	0
6	(Russia) A Rodionova	6	6

Second round
1	(Ukraine) N Kichenok	2	7^{10}	7
(Russia) M Gasparyan	6	6^{8}	5
(Czech Republic) T Martincová	6	3	6
Q	(Russia) E Alexandrova	3	6	0
4	(Germany) A-L Friedsam	6	6
(Russia) Y Kalabina	1	1
(Thailand) N Lertcheewakarn	5	6	6
6	(Russia) A Rodionova	7	4	0

Quarterfinals
1	(Ukraine) N Kichenok	6	6
(Czech Republic) T Martincová	0	4
4	(Germany) A-L Friedsam	6	6
(Thailand) N Lertcheewakarn	1	2

Semifinals
1	(Ukraine) N Kichenok	3	2
4	(Germany) A-L Friedsam	6	6

=== Bottom half ===
First round
5	(Ukraine) L Kichenok	6	1	6
(Georgia (country)) S Shapatava	3	6	1
(Russia) Y Buchina	3	6	4
(Russia) M Melnikova	6	2	6
WC	(Russia) E Rodina	7	7
(Belarus) A Sasnovich	5	5
WC	(Russia) E Kulichkova	7	6^{3}	3
3	(Russia) M Sirotkina	5	7^{7}	6
8	(Ukraine) K Kozlova	5	6	6
(Russia) M Katsitadze	7	4	2
(Ukraine) T Arefyeva	3	4
(Ukraine) V Ivakhnenko	6	6
(Ukraine) V Kapshay	6	6^{4}	2
(Czech Republic) K Vaňková	1	7^{7}	6
Q	(Russia) A Frolova	4	1
2	(Poland) M Linette	6	6

Second round
5	(Ukraine) L Kichenok	6	6
(Russia) M Melnikova	3	3
WC	(Russia) E Rodina	3	1
3	(Russia) M Sirotkina	6	6
8	(Ukraine) K Kozlova	6	6
(Ukraine) V Ivakhnenko	1	3
(Czech Republic) K Vaňková	6	6
2	(Poland) M Linette	4	0

Quarterfinals
5	(Ukraine) L Kichenok	6^{4}	6^{8}
3	(Russia) M Sirotkina	7^{7}	7^{10}
8	(Ukraine) K Kozlova	6	6
(Czech Republic) K Vaňková	1	4

Semifinals
3	(Russia) M Sirotkina	6	6
8	(Ukraine) K Kozlova	4	4
