= Akgul Amanmuradova =

Uzbekistani tennis player (born 1984)

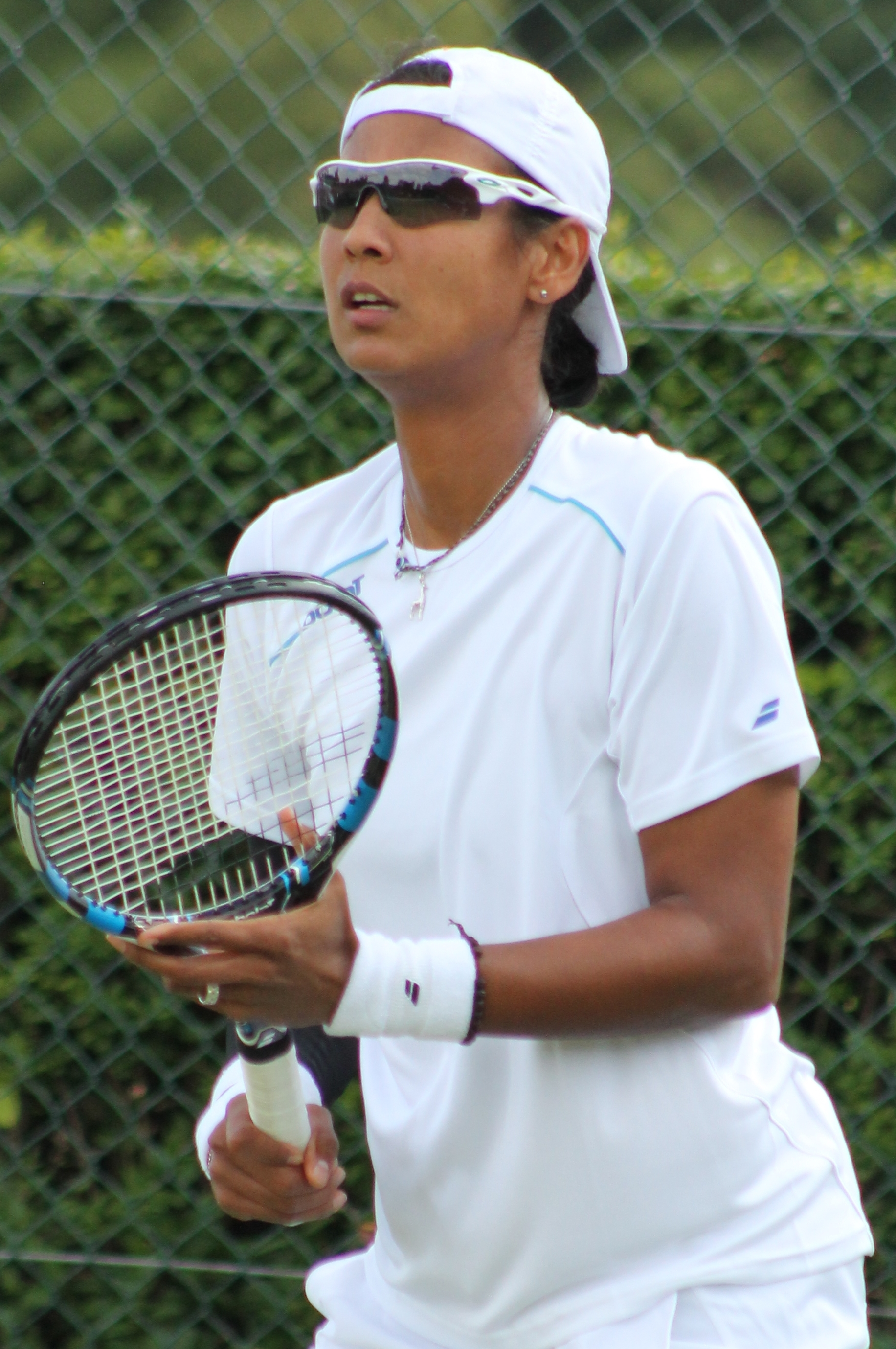
- Amanmuradova during the 2015 Wimbledon qualifying
- Full name: Akgul Charievna Amanmuradova
- Country (sports): Uzbekistan
- Born: 23 June 1984 (age 42) Tashkent, Uzbek SSR, Soviet Union
- Height: 1.90 m (6 ft 3 in)
- Turned pro: 2000
- Retired: (last match played in 2022)
- Plays: Right (two-handed backhand)
- Prize money: US$ 1,549,307

Singles
- Career record: 427–371
- Career titles: 10 ITF
- Highest ranking: No. 50 (26 May 2008)

Grand Slam singles results
- Australian Open: 2R (2006, 2009, 2013)
- French Open: 3R (2010)
- Wimbledon: 1R (2008, 2009, 2010, 2011, 2012)
- US Open: 3R (2011)

Doubles
- Career record: 294–256
- Career titles: 2 WTA, 16 ITF
- Highest ranking: No. 36 (18 January 2010)

Grand Slam doubles results
- Australian Open: 2R (2009)
- French Open: 2R (2012)
- Wimbledon: 3R (2008, 2010)
- US Open: 2R (2011)

Grand Slam mixed doubles results
- Australian Open: 2R (2010)
- French Open: 2R (2010)
- US Open: 1R (2009)

Team competitions
- Fed Cup: 49–42

Akgul Amanmuradova
Medal record

Women's Tennis

Representing Uzbekistan

Asian Games
Silver medal – second place	2010 Guangzhou	Singles
Bronze medal – third place	2006 Doha	Team

Universiade
Bronze medal – third place	2003 Daegu	Singles

Akgul Charievna Amanmuradova (Uzbek: Oqgul Omonmurodova; born June 23, 1984) is an Uzbek former professional tennis player. At 1.90 metres in height, she is one of the tallest female tennis players in history.

Amanmuradova has won two doubles titles on the WTA Tour, as well as ten singles and 16 doubles titles on the ITF Women's Circuit. On 26 May 2008, she reached her best singles ranking of world No. 50. On 18 January 2010, she peaked at No. 36 in the WTA doubles rankings.

Amanmuradova has twice reached the final of the Tashkent Open in her native Uzbekistan, losing in 2005 to Michaëlla Krajicek and in 2009 to Shahar Pe'er. She has also reached the final of the 2011 President's Cup in Nur-Sultan.

== Career ==
=== 2000–2006 ===
Amanmuradova played her first WTA Tour match in her home town of Tashkent where she lost in the first round. She played her first ITF tournaments in 2002, and reached the semifinals in Mysore and finals in Manila and Hyderabad, both times losing to Sania Mirza.

2003 was a successful year for Amanmuradova; she won four singles titles, including a $25k tournament in Mumbai. She secured victories in Incheon, Pune and Mumbai. In August 2004, Amanmuradova won a $10k tournament in Coimbra, Portugal. She reached the semifinals in New Delhi and Mumbai and won two more titles in Pune and Bangkok. In 2005, she qualified for her first ever WTA Tour tournament in Pattaya City. She reached the semifinals in Phuket and Coimbra but her real success story came when she reached the final at the Tashkent Open. This run pushed her into the top 200 for the first time. Amanmuradova received a wild-card entry into the Australian Open, where she defeated Dally Randriantefy in three sets in the first round. In the second round, she faced 17th seed Daniela Hantuchová and was defeated in two sets.

Amanmuradova then tried to qualify for Pattaya City and Bangalore but lost in the qualifying tournaments. She represented Uzbekistan in the Fed Cup again, this time playing in the Asia/Oceania Group 1. She lost to Samantha Stosur of Australia and Mi Yoo of South Korea. Uzbekistan was made to play New Zealand in the relegation play-off and Amanmuradova was matched up against Marina Erakovic. She lost in straight sets and Uzbekistan was relegated.

Amanmuradova tried to qualify for Wimbledon, the French Open and the US Open, but lost in the qualifying tournaments. She returned to Tashkent but failed to replicate her run from the previous year, falling to Tamarine Tanasugarn in the first round. This meant she fell out of the top 200 for the first time in 2006.

In November, Amanmuradova played the Shanghai $50k tournament and defeated the first, third and fifth seeds to reach the final. Here she faced Tamarine Tanasugarn again, and again she was unable to defeat her. At the end of 2006, Amanmuradova reached the final at Pune, a tournament she had won two times before. However, she was forced to retire with a knee strain.

She ended the year with a 21–21 record and a ranking of 227.

=== 2007–2009: Cincinnati semifinalist and top 50 debut ===
Amanmuradova began the year by losing in the qualifying tournament at the Australian Open. This meant a significant drop in rankings as she had reached the second round in the previous year. In March, Amanmuradova headed to the $25k Mumbai tournament, which she won for the third time, dispatching Stefanie Vögele in the final.

At the French Open she managed to qualify by defeating María José Argeri, Evgeniya Rodina and Gréta Arn. In the first round she faced world No. 74, Vania King, whom she defeated in a tight match. In the second round Amanmuradova came up against world No. 10, Nicole Vaidišová, to whom she lost in two sets. This success boosted her ranking back into the top 200, and she reached a new career high of 141.

In July, Amanmuradova headed to Cincinnati. Here she managed to qualify and make it to the semifinals, defeating Bethanie Mattek along the way. However, she lost to Akiko Morigami in the semifinals, the same woman she had lost to in the fed cup five years prior. This success pushed her ranking up to 108. After another good performance in Tashkent, she moved into the top 100 for the first time. She ended the year with a record of 32–20 and a ranking of 97.

Amanmuradova began the year 2008 with a direct acceptance into the Australian Open, the first time she had ever been accepted straight into a Grand Slam tournament. She lost in the first round to 26th seed Victoria Azarenka in two sets. Playing in the Fed Cup, Amanmuradova defeated Chan Yung-jan and Tamarine Tanasugarn for a chance of promotion. However, she lost to Marina Erakovic of New Zealand in the promotion playoff.

At Pattaya City, Amanmuradova made it to the semifinals, losing to American Jill Craybas. After this, she rose to a career high of 85. In Berlin Amanmuradova managed to qualify for the premier event. After knocking out Aravane Rezaï of France, she faced world No. 2, Ana Ivanovic. This was the first time she had played a top-five player. She held her own, pushing the first set to a tie-break, before losing the match in straight sets.

Amanmuradova was playing some of her best tennis. At the İstanbul Cup, she made it to the semifinals, defeating Nadia Petrova en route. Here she fell to world No. 7, Elena Dementieva. After this she reached her highest ever ranking of World No. 50. For the rest of the year she didn't excel as much as previously. She made it to the second round of the French Open for the second year running. She represented Uzbekistan at the Beijing Olympics, losing to Francesca Schiavone in the first round. She ended the year with a 22–29 singles record and a ranking of 80.

Amanmuradova began the new year by reaching the second round at the 2009 Australian Open, defeating Melanie Oudin in the first round before falling to María José Martínez Sánchez. Her ranking slipped throughout the year as she had little success on the WTA Tour. She went to play at the $100k Open de Biarritz and reached the semifinals, defeating world No. 86, Mathilde Johansson in the process, before falling to Julia Görges. The next week she reached another semifinal at a $50k tournament in Contrexéville.

She returned to the WTA Tour, but had little success until her home tournament, the Tashkent Open, where she reached her second WTA Tour final. She defeated Stefanie Vögele and Yaroslava Shvedova in straight sets en route to the final. In the final, she was defeated by Shahar Pe'er in two sets. Amanmuradova and partner Ai Sugiyama won the Aegon International at Eastbourne, the only WTA Premier event played on grass. She also won the $100k doubles tournament in Cuneo alongside Darya Kustova. She ended the 2009 season ranked 85 with a win–loss record of 25–27.

=== 2010: French Open third round ===
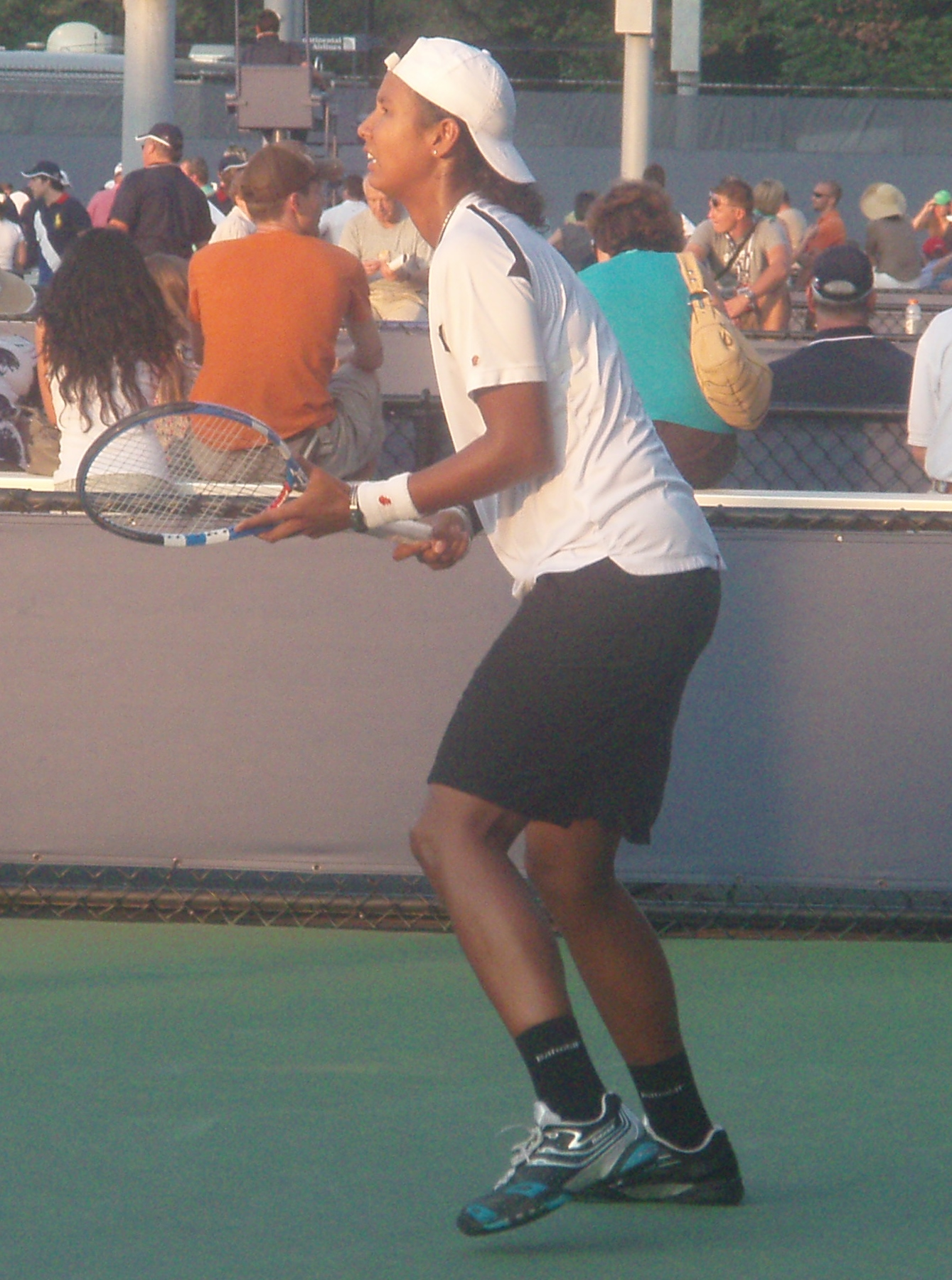
Amanmuradova at the US Open, 2010

Amanmuradova began the year with three consecutive losses in qualifying at the Brisbane International and the Sydney International. She followed this up with a first-round loss at the Australian Open to Croatian Karolina Šprem.

At the first round of the Pattaya Open, Amanmuradova was forced to retire with an abdominal strain whilst trailing Sabine Lisicki 6–0. In doubles, she had a successful start to the year, reaching the semifinals of the Brisbane International alongside Chan Yung-jan. After this, she rose to her career high in doubles: No. 36.

Ammanmuradova then had some recent success in singles as she qualified for the Indian Wells Open after defeating Chanelle Scheepers and Patricia Mayr. However, in the first round she was defeated by Tsvetana Pironkova.

Amanmuradova then lost to Tsvetana Pironkova again the following week, this time in the first round of the qualifying draw of the Miami Open. She then qualified for the main draw of the Italian Open by defeating Giulia Gatto-Monticone, and Chanelle Scheepers. She then lost to 12th seed Flavia Pennetta in the first round.

Amanmuradova then qualified for a Premier Mandatory Madrid Open, by defeating Roberta Vinci and Ayumi Morita. She again lost in the first round, this time to Alisa Kleybanova. At the Warsaw Open, she was upset by world No. 537, Natalie Grandin, in the first round of the qualifying draw.

At the French Open, her ranking enabled her to be directly entered into the main draw. In the first round, she caused one of the biggest upsets of the day by defeating 20th seed and well established clay-court player María José Martínez Sánchez. She then defeated Johanna Larsson to move into the third round for the first time in her career. She then lost to Chanelle Scheepers in two sets.

Amanmuradova was unable to shift her good form onto the grass and suffered a first-round loss at the Eastbourne International to Craybas and a first-round loss at Wimbledon to Svetlana Kuznetsova.

At the Swedish Open, Amanmuradova defeated Mariana Duque Marino in the first round before falling to Barbora Záhlavová-Strýcová in the second.

Amanmuradova then suffered two more first-round losses. At the Italian Open, she was defeated again by Jill Craybas. She then lost in the first round of the İstanbul Cup to Sorana Cîrstea.

To begin preparations for the US Open, she entered the first tournament of the US Open Series, the San Diego Open. Her ranking was too low for her to gain direct entry into the main draw, so she had to qualify. She won her first qualifying match against Yurika Sema, but lost her second to Chanelle Scheepers.

Then, next tournament Amanmuradova entered was the Cincinnati Open. Again, she had to qualify to enter the main draw, and she did so by defeating Anna Tatishvili and Varvara Lepchenko. In the first round of the main draw, she upset Japanese veteran Kimiko Date-Krumm. In the second round, she defeated Bojana Jovanovski to book a third-round encounter with top seed and world No. 2, Jelena Janković. Despite being 112 places below Janković in the rankings, Amanmuradova won to record her first ever top-5 win. She ran out of steam in the quarterfinals, losing to another Serbian, resurgent Ana Ivanovic in two sets.

At the US Open, Amanmuradova qualified by winning all three matches in the qualifying tournament. She defeated Dia Evtimova, Ryōko Fuda, and Valérie Tétreault. In the first round of the main draw, she defeated Chanelle Scheepers for the third time that year. Her run was ended by No. 31 seed Kaia Kanepi, in straight sets.

Amanmuradova gained direct entry into the Guangzhou International Open and defeated Olga Savchuk in the first round. She was defeated in straight sets by Sania Mirza in the second round. Seeded No. 2 at her home tournament in Tashkent where she made the final in 2005 and 2009, Amanmuradova defeated Eirini Georgatou in the first round. In the second, she defeated American veteran Jill Craybas for the first time, in three sets. In the quarterfinals, she was defeated in straight sets by No. 7 seed Alla Kudryavtseva.

She ended the year in the top 100 for the fourth year in a row with a ranking of 70.

=== 2011–2013 ===
Amanmuradova failed to win a single match in Australia, losing in the first round of the Brisbane International, the Hobart International and the Australian Open.

She won her first match of the season in Pattaya, Thailand, competing at the Pattaya Open where she defeated seventh seed Zheng Jie in the first round. She then defeated Chanelle Scheepers to book a quarterfinal place against No. 4 seed Daniela Hantuchová. Her run ended, however, after a drubbing by Hantuchová.

She then competed at the Dubai Championships, but lost in the first round to wildcard receiver Sania Mirza.

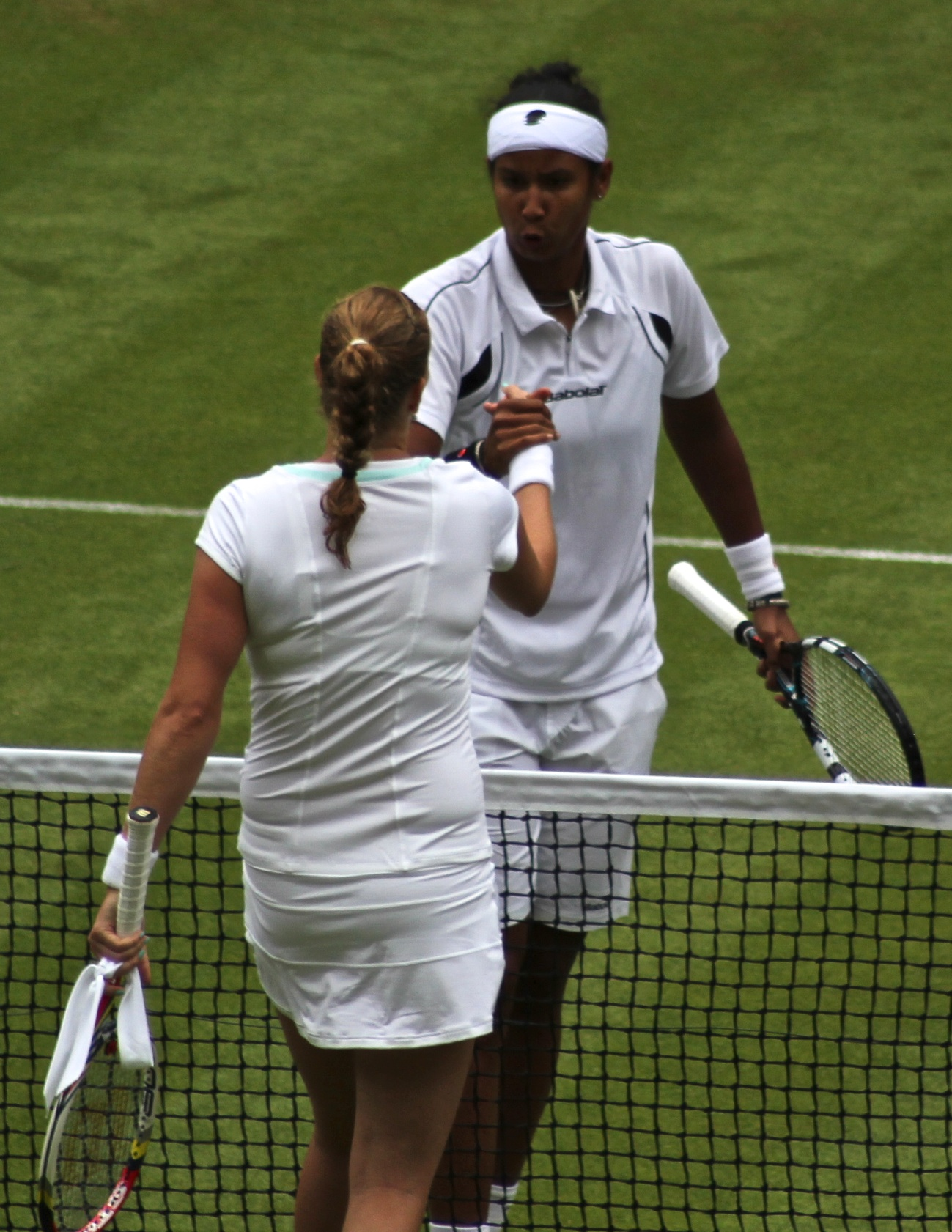
Amanmuradova with Petra Kvitová of Czech Republic at Wimbledon 2012

Amanmuradova started off the 2012 season falling in the qualifying draws of both Brisbane and the Australian Open. She then represented Uzbekistan at the 2012 Fed Cup in Shenzhen, China. She won her singles match against Ayu Fani Damayanti, but lost both doubles matches.

Amanmuradova then lost early in Pattaya and Kuala Lumpur, to Vera Zvonareva and Agnieszka Radwańska, respectively. She failed to qualify for the Premier Mandatory tournaments in Indian Wells and Miami, and also lost in the first round at Osprey.

As the clay-court season began, she managed to make it to the main draw of Charleston, but was beaten by Jill Craybas. She was given a lucky loser spot in Stuttgart where she upset Dominika Cibulková in round one, her biggest win since 2010. However, she could not hold on to the good form, as she lost early in Budapest, Cagnes-sur-Mer and Prague. She was also beaten in the qualifications at Roland Garros.

On grass, she lost in round one at the Rosmalen Open. She also lost in the first round of 2012 Wimbledon Championships, to Petra Kvitová in straight sets.

=== 2019–2022 ===
As of 2019, she was playing on the ITF Circuit. She won her first title since 2014 at the 25k event at Almaty in September, defeating Valeriya Yushchenko in the final.

== Grand Slam performance timelines ==
Key
W	F	SF	QF	#R	RR	Q#	P#	DNQ	A	Z#	PO	G	S	B	NMS	NTI	P	NH

(W) winner; (F) finalist; (SF) semifinalist; (QF) quarterfinalist; (#R) rounds 4, 3, 2, 1; (RR) round-robin stage; (Q#) qualification round; (P#) preliminary round; (DNQ) did not qualify; (A) absent; (Z#) Davis/Fed Cup Zonal Group (with number indication) or (PO) play-off; (G) gold, (S) silver or (B) bronze Olympic/Paralympic medal; (NMS) not a Masters tournament; (NTI) not a Tier I tournament; (P) postponed; (NH) not held; (SR) strike rate (events won / competed); (W–L) win–loss record.
To avoid confusion and double counting, these charts are updated at the conclusion of a tournament or when the player's participation has ended.

=== Singles ===
Tournament	2005	2006	2007	2008	2009	2010	2011	2012	2013	2014	2015	SR	W–L	Win%
Grand Slam tournaments
Australian Open	A	2R	Q1	1R	2R	1R	1R	Q1	2R	Q1	Q2	0 / 6	3–6	33%
French Open	A	Q1	2R	2R	2R	3R	1R	Q2	Q1	A	Q1	0 / 5	5–5	50%
Wimbledon	A	Q2	Q3	1R	1R	1R	1R	1R	A	A	Q1	0 / 5	0–5	0%
US Open	Q1	Q1	Q1	1R	Q1	2R	3R	1R	A	Q1	A	0 / 4	3–4	38%
Win–loss	0–0	1–1	1–1	1–4	2–3	3–4	2–4	0–2	1–1	0–0	0–0	0 / 20	11–20	35%
Career statistics
Titles	0	0	0	0	0	0	0	0	0	0	0	Career total: 0		
Finals	1	0	0	0	1	0	0	0	0	0	0	Career total: 2		
Year-end ranking	192	227	95	81	85	69	115	194	207	244	297	$1,549,307		

=== Doubles ===
Tournament	2007	2008	2009	2010	2011	2012	2013	SR	W–L	Win%
Australian Open	A	A	2R	1R	1R	1R	1R	0 / 5	1–5	17%
French Open	A	1R	1R	1R	1R	2R	A	0 / 5	1–5	17%
Wimbledon	Q1	3R	1R	3R	1R	1R	A	0 / 5	4–5	44%
US Open	A	1R	1R	1R	2R	1R	A	0 / 5	1–5	17%
Win–loss	0–1	2–3	1–4	2–4	1–4	1–4	0–1	0 / 20	7–20	26%

== WTA Tour finals ==
=== Singles: 2 (2 runner-ups) ===
Legend Tier II / Premier Tier III, IV & V / International	Finals by surface Hard (0–2)

Result	W–L	Date	Tournament	Tier	Surface	Opponent	Score
Loss	0–1	Oct 2005	Tashkent Open, Uzbekistan	Tier IV	Hard	(Netherlands) Michaëlla Krajicek	0–6, 6–4, 3–6
Loss	0–2	Sep 2009	Tashkent Open, Uzbekistan	International	Hard	(Israel) Shahar Pe'er	3–6, 4–6

=== Doubles: 4 (2 titles, 2 runner-ups) ===
Legend Tier I / Premier M & Premier 5 Tier II / Premier Tier III, IV & V / International	Finals by surface Hard (0–2) Grass (1–0) Clay (1–0)

Result	W–L	Date	Tournament	Tier	Surface	Partner	Opponents	Score
Win	1–0	Jun 2009	Eastbourne International, UK	Premier	Grass	(Japan) Ai Sugiyama	(Australia) Samantha Stosur (Australia) Rennae Stubbs	6–4, 6–3
Win	2–0	May 2011	Internationaux de Strasbourg, France	International	Clay	(Chinese Taipei) Chuang Chia-jung	(South Africa) Natalie Grandin (Czech Republic) Vladimíra Uhlířová	6–4, 5–7, [10–2]
Loss	2–1	Sep 2012	Korea Open, South Korea	International	Hard	(United States) Vania King	(United States) Raquel Kops-Jones (United States) Abigail Spears	6–2, 2–6, [8–10]
Loss	2–2	Feb 2013	Pattaya Open, Thailand	International	Hard	(Russia) Alexandra Panova	(Japan) Kimiko Date-Krumm (Australia) Casey Dellacqua	3–6, 2–6

== ITF Circuit finals ==
Legend
$100,000 tournaments
$75/80,000 tournaments
$50/60,000 tournaments
$25,000 tournaments
$10,000 tournaments

=== Singles: 20 (10 titles, 10 runner-ups) ===
Result	W–L	Date	Tournament	Tier	Surface	Opponent	Score
Loss	0–1	Sep 2002	ITF Hyderabad, India	10,000	Hard	(India) Sania Mirza	1–6, 2–6
Loss	0–2	Nov 2002	ITF Manila, Philippines	10,000	Hard	(India) Sania Mirza	0–6, 6–4, 3–6
Win	1–2	Apr 2003	ITF Mumbai, India	10,000	Hard	(India) Rushmi Chakravarthi	6–4, 3–6, 7–5
Loss	1–3	Apr 2003	ITF Mumbai, India	10,000	Hard	(India) Manisha Malhotra	6–2, 4–6, 6–7^{(10)}
Win	2–3	Jun 2003	ITF Inchon, South Korea	10,000	Hard	(Malaysia) Khoo Chin-bee	7–5, 6–1
Win	3–3	Nov 2003	ITF Mumbai, India	25,000	Hard	(India) Isha Lakhani	6–2, 6–3
Win	4–3	Nov 2003	ITF Pune, India	10,000	Hard	(India) Meghha Vakaria	7–5, 6–3
Win	5–3	Aug 2004	ITF Coimbra, Portugal	10,000	Hard	(Russia) Irina Kotkina	6–2, 6–3
Win	6–3	Oct 2004	ITF Pune, India	10,000	Hard	(India) Rushmi Chakravarthi	6–0, 7–6^{(5)}
Win	7–3	Dec 2004	ITF Bangkok, Thailand	10,000	Hard	(Thailand) Napaporn Tongsalee	6–2, 6–3
Loss	7–4	Nov 2006	ITF Shanghai, China	50,000	Hard	(Thailand) Tamarine Tanasugarn	3–6, 3–6
Loss	7–5	Nov 2006	ITF Pune, India	25,000	Clay	(Kazakhstan) Amina Rakhim	6–7^{(5)}, 2–4 ret.
Win	8–5	Mar 2007	ITF Mumbai, India	25,000	Hard	(Switzerland) Stefanie Vögele	6–0, 7–5
Loss	8–6	Jul 2011	President's Cup, Kazakhstan	100,000	Hard	(Russia) Vitalia Diatchenko	4–6, 1–6
Loss	8–7	Oct 2011	Open de Touraine, France	50,000	Hard	(United States) Alison Riske	6–2, 2–6, 5–7
Win	9–7	May 2014	ITF Bukhara, Uzbekistan	25,000	Hard	(Ukraine) Veronika Kapshay	6–3, 7–5
Loss	9–8	Dec 2014	Ankara Cup, Turkey	50,000	Hard (i)	(Serbia) Aleksandra Krunić	6–3, 2–6, 6–7^{(6)}
Loss	9–9	June 2016	ITF Ystad, Sweden	25,000	Clay	(Sweden) Susanne Celik	1–6, 3–6
Loss	9–10	Sep 2017	ITF Almaty, Kazakhstan	25,000	Clay	(Russia) Polina Leykina	3–6, 3–6
Win	10–10	Sep 2019	ITF Almaty, Kazakhstan	25,000	Hard	(Russia) Valeriya Yushchenko	6–4, 6–2

=== Doubles: 47 (16 titles, 31 runner-ups) ===
Result	W–L	Date	Tournament	Tier	Surface	Partner	Opponents	Score
Win	1–0	Dec 2002	ITF Pune, India	10,000	Hard	(Ukraine) Kateryna Bondarenko	(India) Sania Mirza (India) Radhika Tulpule	6–3, 7–6^{(1)}
Win	2–0	Feb 2003	ITF Chennai, India	10,000	Hard	(Uzbekistan) Ivanna Israilova	(India) Rushmi Chakravarthi (India) Sai Jayalakshmy Jayaram	6–4, 6–1
Win	3–0	Mar 2003	ITF Mumbai, India	10,000	Hard	(Malaysia) Khoo Chin-bee	(India) Rushmi Chakravarthi (India) Sai Jayalakshmy Jayaram	6–2, 6–2
Loss	3–1	Apr 2003	ITF Mumbai, India	10,000	Hard	(Malaysia) Khoo Chin-bee	(Czech Republic) Ludmila Richterová (Russia) Julia Efremova	5–7, 5–7
Win	4–1	Jun 2004	ITF Alkmaar, Netherlands	10,000	Clay	(Netherlands) Kika Hogendoorn	(Netherlands) Kelly de Beer (Netherlands) Eva Pera	6–2, 6–2
Win	5–1	Aug 2004	ITF Coimbra, Portugal	10,000	Hard	(Russia) Irina Kotkina	(Germany) Sarah Raab (Slovenia) Sandra Volk	2–6, 6–1, 6–1
Loss	5–2	Aug 2004	ITF New Delhi, India	25,000	Hard	(India) Sania Mirza	(Chinese Taipei) Chuang Chia-jung (Chinese Taipei) Hsieh Su-wei	6–7^{(6)}, 4–6
Win	6–2	Oct 2004	ITF Pune, India	10,000	Hard	(India) Sai Jayalakshmy Jayaram	(Thailand) Wilawan Choptang (Thailand) Thassha Vitayaviroj	6–3, 4–6, 6–3
Win	7–2	Nov 2004	ITF Mumbai, India	25,000	Hard	(India) Sai Jayalakshmy Jayaram	(Croatia) Maria Abramović (Czech Republic) Hana Šromová	4–6, 6–4, 6–4
Win	8–2	Dec 2004	ITF Bangkok, Thailand	10,000	Hard	(Thailand) Napaporn Tongsalee	(Chinese Taipei) Hwang I-hsuan (Thailand) Nudnida Luangnam	6–4, 6–4
Loss	8–3	May 2005	ITF Ho Chi Minh City, Vietnam	25,000	Hard	(Thailand) Napaporn Tongsalee	(Indonesia) Wynne Prakusya (Indonesia) Romana Tedjakusuma	4–6, 0–6
Win	9–3	May 2005	ITF Phuket, Thailand	25,000	Hard	(Thailand) Napaporn Tongsalee	(Australia) Monique Adamczak (Germany) Annette Kolb	6–1, 6–1
Loss	9–4	Jun 2005	ITF Périgueux, France	25,000	Clay	(Germany) Antonia Matic	(Slovakia) Katarína Kachlíková (Slovakia) Lenka Tvarošková	5–7, 1–6
Loss	9–5	Nov 2005	Internationaux de Poitiers, France	75,000	Hard (i)	(Russia) Nina Bratchikova	(Estonia) Maret Ani (Bosnia and Herzegovina) Mervana Jugić-Salkić	6–7^{(0)}, 1–6
Loss	9–6	Mar 2006	ITF Hammond, United States	25,000	Hard	(Indonesia) Romana Tedjakusuma	(United States) Tetiana Luzhanska (Chinese Taipei) Chan Chin-wei	1–6, 3–6
Loss	9–7	Jul 2006	ITF Mont-de-Marsan, France	25,000	Clay	(Russia) Nina Bratchikova	(Georgia (country)) Margalita Chakhnashvili (Romania) Raluca Olaru	5–7, 6–1, 1–6
Loss	9–8	Jul 2006	Lexington Challenger, United States	50,000	Hard	(United States) Varvara Lepchenko	(Chinese Taipei) Chan Chin-wei; Abigail Spears	1–6, 1–6
Loss	9–9	Jul 2006	ITF Washington, United States	75,000	Hard	(United States) Varvara Lepchenko	(Chinese Taipei) Chan Chin-wei (United States) Tetiana Luzhanska	2–6, 6–1, 0–6
Loss	9–10	Nov 2006	ITF Shanghai, China	50,000	Hard	(Uzbekistan) Iroda Tulyaganova	(China) Ji Chunmei (China) Sun Shengnan	4–6, 5–7
Loss	9–11	Nov 2006	Shenzhen Open, China	50,000	Hard	(Uzbekistan) Iroda Tulyaganova	(Chinese Taipei) Hsieh Su-wei (Russia) Alla Kudryavtseva	0–2 ret.
Win	10–11	Mar 2007	ITF Mumbai, India	25,000	Hard	(Russia) Nina Bratchikova	(Russia) Olga Panova (Switzerland) Stefanie Vögele	6–2, 6–3
Loss	10–12	May 2007	Open Saint-Gaudens, France	50,000	Hard	(France) Iryna Brémond	(Argentina) Jorgelina Cravero (Belarus) Darya Kustova	1–6, 3–6
Loss	10–13	Nov 2007	ITF Deauville, France	50,000	Clay (i)	(Belarus) Anastasiya Yakimova	(Czech Republic) Renata Voráčová (Czech Republic) Barbora Strýcová	3–6, 5–7
Loss	10–14	Oct 2008	Internationaux de Poitiers, France	100,000	Hard (i)	(Romania) Monica Niculescu	(Czech Republic) Petra Cetkovská (Czech Republic) Lucie Šafářová	4–6, 4–6
Loss	10–15	Oct 2008	Slovak Open, Slovakia	100,000	Hard (i)	(Romania) Monica Niculescu	(Czech Republic) Andrea Hlaváčková (Czech Republic) Lucie Hradecká	6–7^{(1)}, 1–6
Win	11–15	Jul 2009	Cuneo International, Italy	100,000	Clay	(Belarus) Darya Kustova	(Czech Republic) Petra Cetkovská (France) Mathilde Johansson	5–7, 6–1, [10–7]
Loss	11–16	Jul 2009	Open de Biarritz, France	100,000	Clay	(Belarus) Darya Kustova	(Australia) Anastasia Rodionova (Chinese Taipei) Chan Yung-jan	6–3, 4–6, [7–10]
Loss	11–17	Oct 2010	Internationaux de Poitiers, France	100,000	Hard (i)	(Germany) Kristina Barrois	(Czech Republic) Lucie Hradecká (Czech Republic) Renata Voráčová	7–6^{(5)}, 2–6, [5–10]
Loss	11–18	Jul 2011	President's Cup, Kazakhstan	100,000	Hard	(Russia) Alexandra Panova	(Russia) Vitalia Diatchenko (Kazakhstan) Galina Voskoboeva	3–6, 4–6
Loss	11–19	Nov 2011	Dubai Tennis Challenge, UAE	75,000	Hard	(Romania) Alexandra Dulgheru	(Russia) Nina Bratchikova (Croatia) Darija Jurak	4–6, 6–3, [6–10]
Loss	11–20	May 2012	Prague Open, Czech Republic	100,000	Clay	(Australia) Casey Dellacqua	(France) Alizé Cornet (France) Virginie Razzano	2–6, 3–6
Win	12–20	Oct 2012	GB Pro-Series Barnstaple, UK	75,000	Hard (i)	(Serbia) Vesna Dolonc	(Belarus) Aliaksandra Sasnovich (Latvia) Diāna Marcinkēviča	6–3, 6–1
Loss	12–21	May 2014	ITF Bukhara, Uzbekistan	25,000	Hard	(Uzbekistan) Nigina Abduraimova	(Ukraine) Veronika Kapshay (Uzbekistan) Sabina Sharipova	4–6, 4–6
Loss	12–22	May 2016	Zhengzhou Open, China	50,000	Hard	(Slovakia) Michaela Hončová	(China) Xun Fangying (China) You Xiaodi	6–1, 2–6, [7–10]
Loss	12–23	Jul 2016	Bella Cup, Poland	25,000	Clay	(Russia) Valentyna Ivakhnenko	(Romania) Irina Bara (Romania) Valeria Savinykh	3–6, 6–4, [7–10]
Finalist (Note: doubles final cancelled after the 2016 Turkish coup d'état attempt)	– NP –	Jul 2016	Bursa Cup, Turkey	60,000	Clay	(Russia) Natela Dzalamidze	(Georgia (country)) Ekaterine Gorgodze (Georgia (country)) Sofia Shapatava	canc.
Loss	12–24	Jun 2017	ITF Andijan, Uzbekistan	25,000	Hard	(Ukraine) Valeriya Strakhova	(Russia) Olga Doroshina (Russia) Polina Monova	2–6, 0–6
Win	13–24	Jun 2017	ITF Moscow, Russia	25,000	Clay	(Russia) Valentyna Ivakhnenko	(Belarus) Ilona Kremen (Belarus) Irina Shymanovich	6–4, 6–2
Loss	13–25	Sep 2017	ITF Almaty, Kazakhstan	25,000	Clay	(Uzbekistan) Nigina Abduraimova	(Brazil) Gabriela Cé (Russia) Yana Sizikova	4–6, 6–3, [7–10]
Win	14–25	Jun 2018	ITF Klosters, Switzerland	25,000	Clay	(Georgia (country)) Ekaterine Gorgodze	(Czech Republic) Lucie Hradecká (Japan) Yuki Naito	6–2, 6–3
Loss	14–26	Jul 2018	President's Cup, Kazakhstan	80,000	Hard	(Georgia (country)) Ekaterine Gorgodze	(Turkey) Berfu Cengiz (Kazakhstan) Anna Danilina	6–3, 3–6, [7–10]
Loss	14–27	Nov 2018	Open Nantes, France	25,000	Hard (i)	(Russia) Alina Silich	(France) Estelle Cascino (France) Elixane Lechemia	5–7, 4–6
Loss	14–28	Apr 2019	Innisbrook Open, United States	80,000	Clay	(Australia) Lizette Cabrera	(United States) Quinn Gleason (United States) Ingrid Neel	7–5, 5–7, [8–10]
Loss	14–29	Jun 2019	Grado Tennis Cup, Italy	25,000	Clay	(Romania) Cristina Dinu	(Kazakhstan) Anna Danilina (Hungary) Réka Luca Jani	2–6, 3–6
Loss	14–30	Aug 2019	ITF Braunschweig, Germany	25,000	Clay	(Uzbekistan) Albina Khabibulina	(Russia) Polina Leykina (France) Marine Partaud	4–6, 6–1, [5–10]
Loss	14–31	Oct 2019	Kiskút Open, Hungary	60,000	Clay (i)	(Romania) Elena Bogdan	(Romania) Irina Bara (Belgium) Maryna Zanevska	6–3, 2–6, [8–10]
Win	15–31	Nov 2019	Open Nantes, France	60,000	Hard (i)	(Georgia (country)) Ekaterine Gorgodze	(Germany) Vivian Heisen (Russia) Yana Sizikova	7–6^{(2)}, 6–3
Win	16–31	May 2021	Liepāja Open, Latvia	25,000	Clay	(Russia) Valentina Ivakhnenko	(Greece) Valentini Grammatikopoulou (Belarus) Shalimar Talbi	6–3, 3–6, [13–11]
