= 2011 President's Cup – Men's singles =

Men's singles
- 2011 President's Cup (tennis)

Final
- Champion: (Kazakhstan) Mikhail Kukushkin
- Runner-up: (Ukraine) Sergei Bubka
- Score: 6–3, 6–4

Events
Singles	men	women
Doubles	men	women
- President's Cup (tennis)

Ivan Dodig was the defending champion, but decided not to participate.

2nd seed Mikhail Kukushkin won the title, defeating Sergei Bubka 6–3, 6–4 in the final.

== Seeds ==
1. (Kazakhstan) Andrey Golubev (semifinals)
2. (Kazakhstan) Mikhail Kukushkin (champion)
3. (Israel) Dudi Sela (first round)
4. (Slovakia) Karol Beck (quarterfinals)
5. (Slovakia) Lukáš Lacko (second round)
6. (Russia) Konstantin Kravchuk (quarterfinals)
7. (Spain) Arnau Brugués-Davi (quarterfinals)
8. (Russia) Denis Matsukevich (first round)

== Draw ==
Key

- Q = Qualifier
- WC = Wild card
- LL = Lucky loser
- Alt = Alternate
- ITF = ITF entry
- PR = Protected ranking
- SR = Special ranking
- SE = Special exempt
- JE = Junior exempt
- JR = Junior Accelerator Programme entrant
- CO = College Accelerator Programme entrant
- NG = Next Gen Accelerator Program entrant
- w/o = Walkover
- r = Retired
- d = Defaulted

=== Finals ===
Semifinals
1/WC	(Kazakhstan) Andrey Golubev	3	3
(Ukraine) Sergei Bubka	6	6
(Tunisia) Malek Jaziri	4	3
2	(Kazakhstan) Mikhail Kukushkin	6	6

Final
(Ukraine) Sergei Bubka	3	4
2	(Kazakhstan) Mikhail Kukushkin	6	6

=== Top half ===
First round
1/WC	(Kazakhstan) A Golubev	5	7	6
(Russia) Ervand Gasparyan	7	6^{5}	1
WC	(Kazakhstan) D Yevseyev	6	6
(India) V Vardhan	4	3
Q	(Russia) Sergei Krotiouk	1	2
PR	(Monaco) J-R Lisnard	6	6
(Russia) Mikhail Vasiliev	1	0
7	(Spain) A Brugués-Davi	6	6
3	(Israel) D Sela	3	2
(Ukraine) S Bubka	6	6
Q	(Germany) Lars Übel	0	1
(Uzbekistan) F Dustov	6	6
(Uzbekistan) M Inoyatov	6	7
(Russia) Vitali Reshetnikov	3	6^{4}
(Russia) Alexander Lobkov	4	1
6	(Russia) K Kravchuk	6	6

Second round
1/WC	(Kazakhstan) A Golubev	6	6
WC	(Kazakhstan) D Yevseyev	4	2
PR	(Monaco) J-R Lisnard	2	2
7	(Spain) A Brugués-Davi	6	6
(Ukraine) S Bubka	7^{7}	6
(Uzbekistan) F Dustov	6^{5}	1
(Uzbekistan) M Inoyatov	6^{4}	1
6	(Russia) K Kravchuk	7^{7}	6

Quarterfinals
1/WC	(Kazakhstan) A Golubev	7	6
7	(Spain) A Brugués-Davi	5	4
(Ukraine) S Bubka	6	6
6	(Russia) K Kravchuk	1	4

Semifinals
1/WC	(Kazakhstan) A Golubev	3	3
(Ukraine) S Bubka	6	6

=== Bottom half ===
First round
5	(Slovakia) L Lacko	6	6
WC	(Kazakhstan) Serizhan Yessenbekov	0	0
(Tunisia) M Jaziri	6	0
(Russia) M Ledovskikh	0	0^{r}
Q	(Kazakhstan) Dmitriy Makeyev	5	6	0
(Belarus) S Betov	7	3	6
(Czech Republic) J Mertl	4	6	4
4	(Slovakia) K Beck	6	3	6
8	(Russia) D Matsukevich	3	2
(Switzerland) M Chiudinelli	6	6
Alt	(Russia) N Basilashvili	4	6	6
(Russia) V Rudnev	6	2	0
Q	(Kazakhstan) Danjil Braun	0	2
(Ukraine) D Molchanov	6	6
WC	(Uzbekistan) V Uzakov	0	0^{r}
2	(Kazakhstan) M Kukushkin	6	2

Second round
5	(Slovakia) L Lacko	7^{7}	3	4
(Tunisia) M Jaziri	6^{2}	6	6
(Belarus) S Betov	2	2
4	(Slovakia) K Beck	6	6
(Switzerland) M Chiudinelli	6	6
Alt	(Russia) N Basilashvili	1	1
(Ukraine) D Molchanov	7^{7}	4	3
2	(Kazakhstan) M Kukushkin	6^{2}	6	6

Quarterfinals
(Tunisia) M Jaziri	6	6
4	(Slovakia) K Beck	2	1
(Switzerland) M Chiudinelli	5	0
2	(Kazakhstan) M Kukushkin	7	6

Semifinals
(Tunisia) M Jaziri	4	3
2	(Kazakhstan) M Kukushkin	6	6
