= 2011 President's Cup – Women's singles =

Women's singles
- 2011 President's Cup (tennis)

Final
- Champion: (Russia) Vitalia Diatchenko
- Runner-up: (Uzbekistan) Akgul Amanmuradova
- Score: 6–4, 6–1

Events
Singles	men	women
Doubles	men	women
- President's Cup (tennis)

Evgeniya Rodina was the defending champion, but lost in the quarterfinals.
Vitalia Diatchenko won the third edition of this tournament, defeating Akgul Amanmuradova in the final, 6–4, 6–1.

== Seeds ==
1. (Russia) Ksenia Pervak (withdrew due to reaching the final at Baku)
2. (Russia) Evgeniya Rodina (quarterfinals)
3. (Netherlands) Arantxa Rus (second round, retired)
4. (Belarus) Anastasiya Yakimova (semifinals)
5. (Russia) Vesna Dolonts (second round)
6. (Uzbekistan) Akgul Amanmuradova (final)
7. (Ukraine) Lesia Tsurenko (quarterfinals)
8. (Japan) Junri Namigata (second round, retired)

== Draw ==
Key

- Q = Qualifier
- WC = Wild card
- LL = Lucky loser
- Alt = Alternate
- ITF = ITF entry
- PR = Protected ranking
- SR = Special ranking
- SE = Special exempt
- JE = Junior exempt
- JR = Junior Accelerator Programme entrant
- CO = College Accelerator Programme entrant
- NG = Next Gen Accelerator Program entrant
- w/o = Walkover
- r = Retired
- d = Defaulted

=== Finals ===
Semifinals
(Russia) Alexandra Panova	3	3
(Russia) Vitalia Diatchenko	6	6
4	(Belarus) Anastasiya Yakimova	6^{2}	1
6	(Uzbekistan) Akgul Amanmuradova	7^{7}	6

Final
(Russia) Vitalia Diatchenko	6	6
6	(Uzbekistan) Akgul Amanmuradova	4	1

=== Top half ===
First round
LL	(Russia) E Yashina	6	6
(Kazakhstan) A Yepisheva	3	3
LL	(Russia) A Romanova	2	2
(Ukraine) V Kapshay	6	6
WC	(Kazakhstan) A Arginbayeva	0	1
(Russia) A Panova	6	6
Q	(Russia) Y Buchina	4	1
5	(Russia) V Dolonts	6	6
3	(Netherlands) A Rus	6^{5}	6	7^{7}
(Kazakhstan) Z Diyas	7^{7}	3	6^{2}
(Russia) E Bychkova	6	6
(Turkey) Ç Büyükakçay	2	3
(Russia) V Diatchenko	6	6
WC	(Russia) Y Putintseva	1	1
LL	(India) P Bhambri	2	3
8	(Japan) J Namigata	6	6

Second round
LL	(Russia) E Yashina	4	6^{3}
(Ukraine) V Kapshay	6	7^{7}
(Russia) A Panova	0	6	6
5	(Russia) V Dolonts	6	4	3
3	(Netherlands) A Rus	7^{8}	6^{4}	0^{r}
(Russia) E Bychkova	6^{6}	7^{7}	2
(Russia) V Diatchenko	6
8	(Japan) J Namigata	2	r

Quarterfinals
(Ukraine) V Kapshay	2	4
(Russia) A Panova	6	6
(Russia) E Bychkova	7^{7}	3	3
(Russia) V Diatchenko	6^{4}	6	6

Semifinals
(Russia) A Panova	3	3
(Russia) V Diatchenko	6	6

=== Bottom half ===
First round
7	(Ukraine) L Tsurenko	6	6
WC	(Russia) E Klyueva	0	1
(Luxembourg) A Kremer	1	6^{9}
(Kazakhstan) G Voskoboeva	6	7^{11}
(Georgia (country)) S Shapatava	1	2
Q	(Belarus) P Pekhova	6	6
Q	(Ukraine) Y Lysa	2	6	4
4	(Belarus) A Yakimova	6	1	6
6	(Uzbekistan) A Amanmuradova	6	6
(Russia) V Solovieva	4	4
(Kazakhstan) S Karatantcheva	6	6
(China) S Zheng	2	3
(France) A Lim	5	6^{6}
(Ukraine) T Arefyeva	7	7^{8}
Q	(Russia) M Zharkova	2	2
2	(Russia) E Rodina	6	6

Second round
7	(Ukraine) L Tsurenko	6	6
(Kazakhstan) G Voskoboeva	3	3
Q	(Belarus) P Pekhova	4	4
4	(Belarus) A Yakimova	6	6
6	(Uzbekistan) A Amanmuradova	6	7^{7}
(Kazakhstan) S Karatantcheva	2	6^{5}
(Ukraine) T Arefyeva	2	3
2	(Russia) E Rodina	6	6

Quarterfinals
7	(Ukraine) L Tsurenko	2	5
4	(Belarus) A Yakimova	6	7
6	(Uzbekistan) A Amanmuradova	6	4	6
2	(Russia) E Rodina	4	6	3

Semifinals
4	(Belarus) A Yakimova	6^{2}	1
6	(Uzbekistan) A Amanmuradova	7^{7}	6
