= 2011 President's Cup – Women's doubles =

Women's doubles
- 2011 President's Cup (tennis)

Final
- Champion: (Russia) Vitalia Diatchenko (Kazakhstan) Galina Voskoboeva
- Runner-up: (Uzbekistan) Akgul Amanmuradova (Russia) Alexandra Panova
- Score: 6–3, 6–4

Events
Singles	men	women
Doubles	men	women
- President's Cup (tennis)

Nina Bratchikova and Ekaterina Ivanova were the defending champions but both decided not to participate.
Vitalia Diatchenko and Galina Voskoboeva won the tournament by defeating Akgul Amanmuradova and Alexandra Panova in the final 6–3, 6–4.

== Seeds ==
1. (Russia) Vitalia Diatchenko / (Kazakhstan) Galina Voskoboeva (champions)
2. (Uzbekistan) Akgul Amanmuradova / (Russia) Alexandra Panova (final)
3. (Russia) Vesna Dolonts / (Russia) Evgeniya Rodina (semifinals)
4. (Turkey) Çağla Büyükakçay / (Ukraine) Veronika Kapshay (quarterfinals)

== Draw ==
Key

- Q = Qualifier
- WC = Wild card
- LL = Lucky loser
- Alt = Alternate
- ITF = ITF entry
- PR = Protected ranking
- SR = Special ranking
- SE = Special exempt
- JE = Junior exempt
- JR = Junior Accelerator Programme entrant
- CO = College Accelerator Programme entrant
- NG = Next Gen Accelerator Program entrant
- w/o = Walkover
- r = Retired
- d = Defaulted

=== Draw ===
First round
1	(Russia) V Diatchenko (Kazakhstan) G Voskoboeva	6	6
(India) P Bhambri (Russia) A Klyueva	1	1
(Belarus) S Pirazhenka (Georgia (country)) S Shapatava	7	6
(Kazakhstan) A Arginbayeva (Kazakhstan) Y Sagitova	5	0
4	(Turkey) Ç Büyükakçay (Ukraine) V Kapshay	3	6	[10]
(Russia) A Romanova (China) Z Yang	6	1	[6]
(Ukraine) T Arefyeva (China) S Zheng	6	1	[10]
(Belarus) P Pekhova (Russia) V Solovieva	2	6	[8]
(Kazakhstan) Z Diyas (Kazakhstan) S Karatantcheva	2	6	[8]
(Russia) E Bychkova (Russia) M Zharkova	6	1	[10]
(Belarus) V Kuzmenkova (Russia) P Monova	3	3
3	(Russia) V Dolonts (Russia) E Rodina	6	6
(Belarus) L Marozava (Russia) E Yashina	6	6
(Kazakhstan) Y Latokhina (Kazakhstan) Y Rezepkina	0	0
(Kazakhstan) D Berezhnaya (Kazakhstan) N Berezhnaya	0	1
2	(Uzbekistan) A Amanmuradova (Russia) A Panova	6	6

Quarterfinals
1	(Russia) V Diatchenko (Kazakhstan) G Voskoboeva	6	6
(Belarus) S Pirazhenka (Georgia (country)) S Shapatava	2	3
4	(Turkey) Ç Büyükakçay (Ukraine) V Kapshay	2	6	[6]
(Ukraine) T Arefyeva (China) S Zheng	6	4	[10]
(Russia) E Bychkova (Russia) M Zharkova	6	4	[1]
3	(Russia) V Dolonts (Russia) E Rodina	3	6	[10]
(Belarus) L Marozava (Russia) E Yashina	0	2
2	(Uzbekistan) A Amanmuradova (Russia) A Panova	6	6

Semifinals
1	(Russia) V Diatchenko (Kazakhstan) G Voskoboeva	6	6
(Ukraine) T Arefyeva (China) S Zheng	4	4
3	(Russia) V Dolonts (Russia) E Rodina	4	1
2	(Uzbekistan) A Amanmuradova (Russia) A Panova	6	6

Final
1	(Russia) V Diatchenko (Kazakhstan) G Voskoboeva	6	6
2	(Uzbekistan) A Amanmuradova (Russia) A Panova	3	4
