= 2011 Tatarstan Open – Singles =

Singles
- 2011 Tatarstan Open

Final
- Champion: (Russia) Yulia Putintseva
- Runner-up: (France) Caroline Garcia
- Score: 6–4, 6–2

Events
Singles	Doubles
- Tatarstan Open

Anna Lapushchenkova was the defending champion, but chose not to participate.
Yulia Putintseva won the title, defeating Caroline Garcia 6–4, 6–2 in the final.

== Seeds ==
1. (Russia) Evgeniya Rodina (quarterfinals)
2. (Russia) Vesna Dolonts (first round, retired)
3. (Belarus) Anastasiya Yakimova (semifinals)
4. (Luxembourg) Mandy Minella (first round)
5. (Russia) Vitalia Diatchenko (semifinals, retired)
6. (Russia) Alexandra Panova (quarterfinals)
7. (France) Caroline Garcia (final)
8. (Russia) Ekaterina Ivanova (second round)

== Main draw ==
Key

- Q = Qualifier
- WC = Wild card
- LL = Lucky loser
- Alt = Alternate
- ITF = ITF entry
- PR = Protected ranking
- SR = Special ranking
- SE = Special exempt
- JE = Junior exempt
- JR = Junior Accelerator Programme entrant
- CO = College Accelerator Programme entrant
- NG = Next Gen Accelerator Program entrant
- w/o = Walkover
- r = Retired
- d = Defaulted

=== Finals ===
Semifinals
7	(France) Caroline Garcia	7	6
3	(Belarus) Anastasiya Yakimova	5	3
5	(Russia) Vitalia Diatchenko	6	5	0^{r}
WC	(Russia) Yulia Putintseva	3	7	3

Final
7	(France) Caroline Garcia	4	2
WC	(Russia) Yulia Putintseva	6	6

=== Top half ===
First round
1	(Russia) E Rodina	6	6
(Uzbekistan) V Ekshibarova	1	2
(Ukraine) T Arefyeva	1	4
(Turkey) Ç Büyükakçay	6	6
(Russia) Y Buchina	4	6^{1}
(Netherlands) R Hogenkamp	6	7^{7}
(Slovakia) K Kučová	4	0
7	(France) C Garcia	6	6
3	(Belarus) A Yakimova	6	7^{7}
Q	(Uzbekistan) N Abduraimova	1	6^{2}
(Russia) V Solovieva	2	2
(Russia) M Sirotkina	6	6
WC	(Russia) E Yashina	2	4
(Russia) D Gavrilova	6	6
Q	(Russia) N Dzalamidze	1	1
6	(Russia) A Panova	6	6

Second round
1	(Russia) E Rodina	6	6
(Turkey) Ç Büyükakçay	4	4
(Netherlands) R Hogenkamp	3	3
7	(France) C Garcia	6	6
3	(Belarus) A Yakimova	4	7	7^{7}
(Russia) M Sirotkina	6	5	6^{3}
(Russia) D Gavrilova	1	3
6	(Russia) A Panova	6	6

Quarterfinals
1	(Russia) E Rodina	6^{5}	6	5
7	(France) C Garcia	7^{7}	1	7
3	(Belarus) A Yakimova	6	6
6	(Russia) A Panova	4	3

Semifinals
7	(France) C Garcia	7	6
3	(Belarus) A Yakimova	5	3

=== Bottom half ===
First round
5	(Russia) V Diatchenko	6	6
Q	(Russia) E Pashkova	1	1
(Turkey) P Özgen	6	6
WC	(Russia) K Lykina	1	3
(Russia) M Shamayko	7^{7}	2	4
(Slovenia) A Klepač	6^{4}	6	6
(Ukraine) V Ivakhnenko	7	4	6
4	(Luxembourg) M Minella	5	6	2
8	(Russia) E Ivanova	2	6	6
(Ukraine) K Kozlova	6	1	4
(Romania) M Buzărnescu	7^{7}	6
Q	(Russia) E Kulikova	6^{2}	0
(Lithuania) L Stančiūtė	6	6
WC	(Russia) A Smolina	2	3
WC	(Russia) Y Putintseva	6	2
2	(Russia) V Dolonts	2	1^{r}

Second round
5	(Russia) V Diatchenko	6	6
(Turkey) P Özgen	3	2
(Slovenia) A Klepač	1	2
(Ukraine) V Ivakhnenko	6	6
8	(Russia) E Ivanova	5	6^{3}
(Romania) M Buzărnescu	7	7^{7}
(Lithuania) L Stančiūtė	6^{5}	2
WC	(Russia) Y Putintseva	7^{7}	6

Quarterfinals
5	(Russia) V Diatchenko	6	6
(Ukraine) V Ivakhnenko	2	2
(Romania) M Buzărnescu	3	7	5
WC	(Russia) Y Putintseva	6	5	7

Semifinals
5	(Russia) V Diatchenko	6	5	0^{r}
WC	(Russia) Y Putintseva	3	7	3
