= Vitalia Diatchenko =

Russian professional tennis player (born 1990)

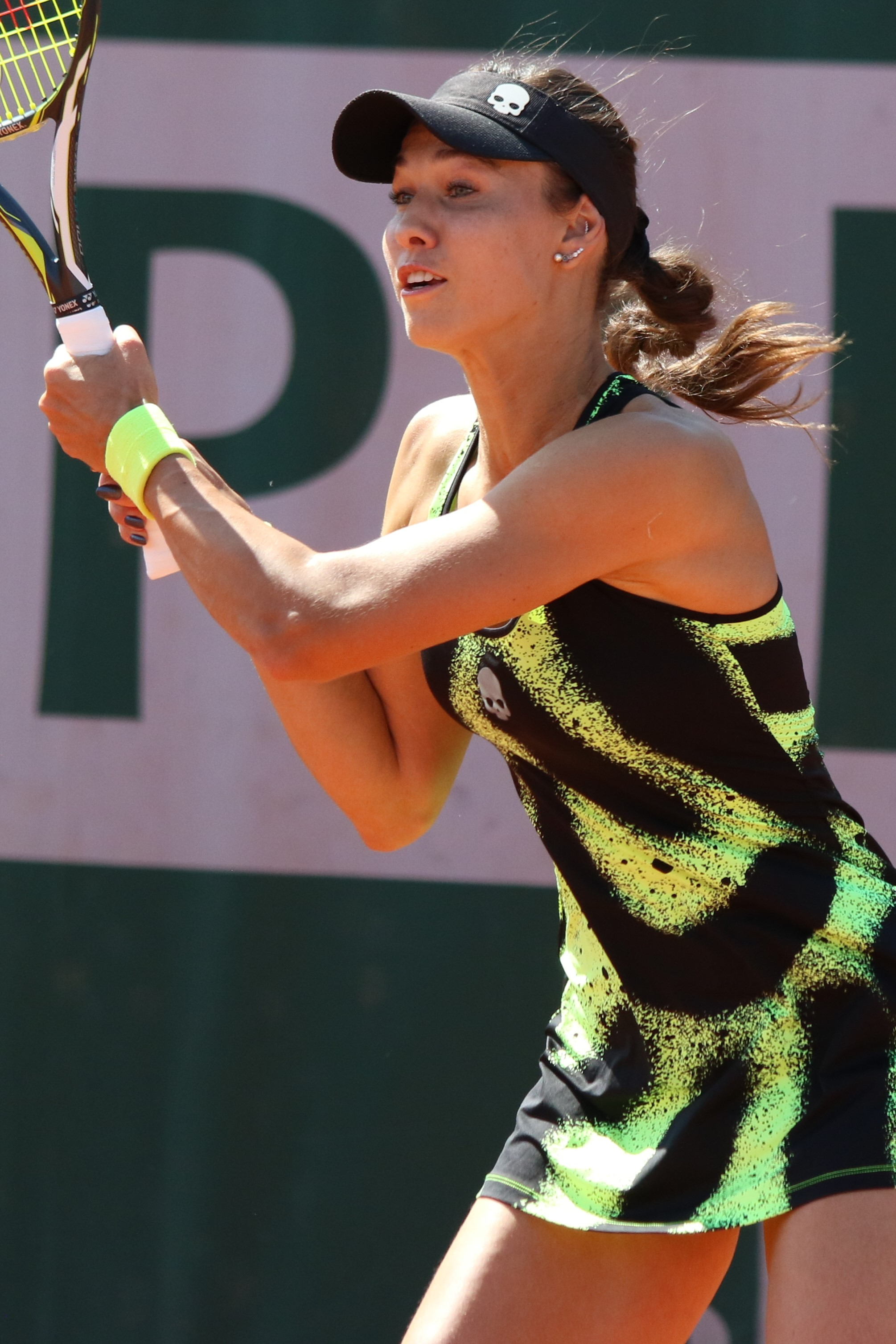
- Diatchenko at the 2022 French Open
- Native name: Виталия Дьяченко
- Country (sports): Russia
- Born: 2 August 1990 (age 36) Sochi, Russian SFSR, Soviet Union
- Height: 1.80 m (5 ft 11 in)
- Plays: Right (two-handed both sides)
- Coach: Garry Cahill
- Prize money: $1,802,903

Singles
- Career record: 425–248
- Career titles: 3 WTA 125
- Highest ranking: No. 71 (17 November 2014)

Grand Slam singles results
- Australian Open: 1R (2015, 2020)
- French Open: 2R (2009, 2015)
- Wimbledon: 3R (2018)
- US Open: 1R (2011, 2015, 2016)

Doubles
- Career record: 176–97
- Career titles: 1 WTA
- Highest ranking: No. 60 (21 February 2011)
- Current ranking: No. 723 (2 November 2026)

Grand Slam doubles results
- Australian Open: 2R (2015)
- French Open: 2R (2016, 2019)
- Wimbledon: 2R (2012)
- US Open: 2R (2010, 2011)

Vitalia Anatolyevna Diatchenko (Russian: Виталия Анатольевна Дьяченко, IPA: [vʲɪˈtalʲɪjə dʲjɪˈtɕenkə]; born 2 August 1990) is an inactive Russian tennis player. Her career-high singles ranking is world No. 71, achieved on 17 November 2014. On 21 February 2011, she peaked at No. 60 in the WTA doubles rankings.

== Career ==
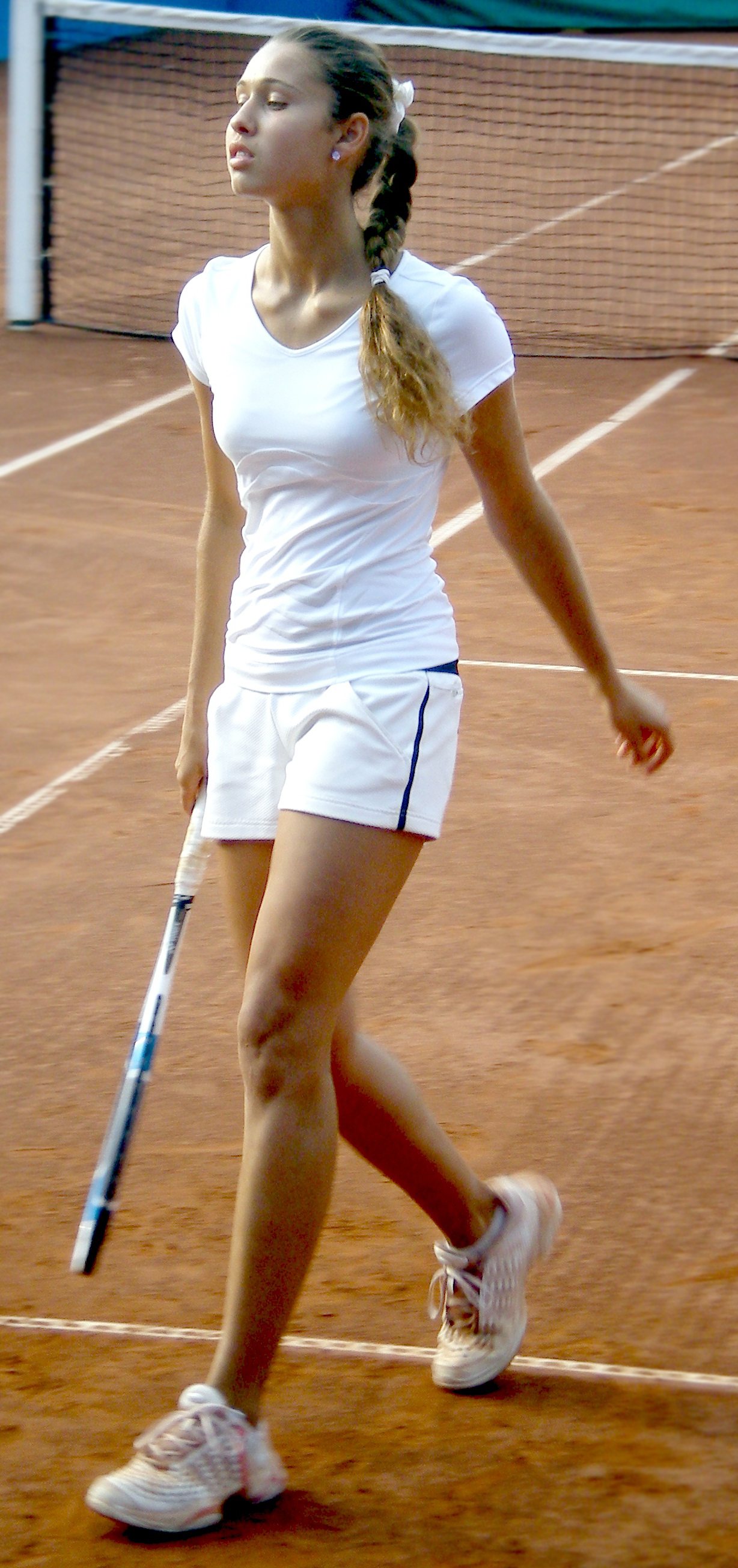
Diatchenko in 2008

=== 2009: Major debut ===
Diatchenko's first Grand Slam tournament was Roland Garros, where she 2009 qualified for the main draw. In the tournament, she upset world No. 75, Mathilde Johansson, before she lost to then-world No. 1, Dinara Safina.

In 2009, she lost the finals of Pattaya Open along with Yulia Beygelzimer to opponents Tamarine Tanasugarn and Yaroslava Shvedova, in straight sets, and of Tashkent Open with Ekaterina Dzehalevich to Tatiana Poutchek and Olga Govortsova, in three sets.

=== 2010 ===
In 2010, she lost the final of the Portugal Open with Aurélie Védy to opponents Anabel Medina Garrigues and Sorana Cîrstea.

At the French Open, she was beaten in the third round of qualifying by Misaki Doi. At the Wimbledon Championships qualifying, she lost in the second round to Monica Niculescu in two sets. Diatchenko also participated in events on the ITF Circuit: she won the tournament in Darmstadt, Germany, where she defeated eighth-seeded German player Julia Schruff in the final.

Then she lost her fourth WTA Tour doubles final with partner Tatiana Poutchek, at Copenhagen to German pair Anna-Lena Grönefeld/Julia Görges.

=== 2011: Top 60 debut in doubles, injury and hiatus ===
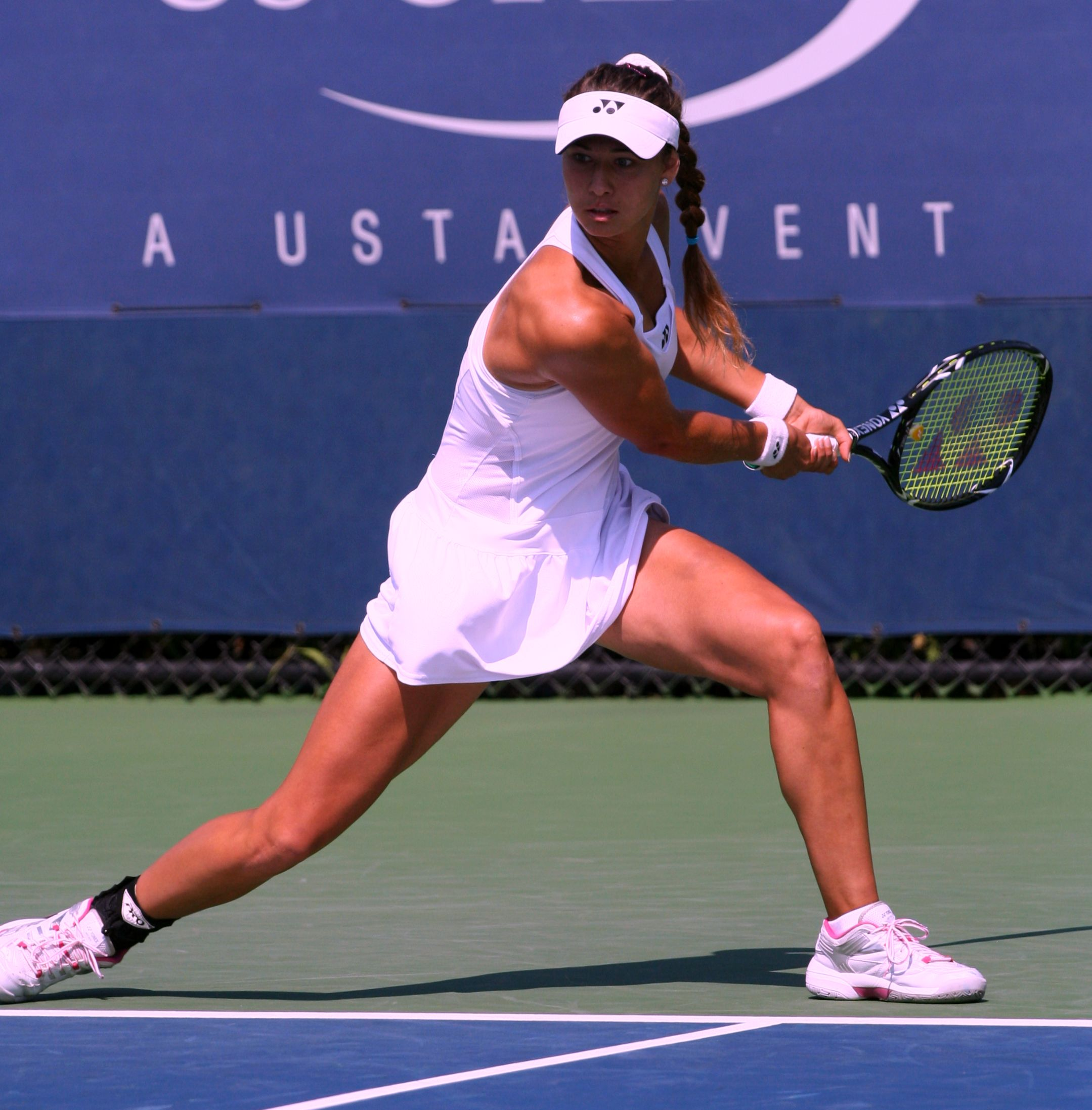
Diatchenko at the 2011 US Open

Vitalia lost in the qualifying at Melbourne in the second round to Sania Mirza in three sets. She then entered the qualifying at the Dubai Open but lost in the first round to Anastasia Pavlyuchenkova, after being 3–1 ahead in the second set.

Diatchenko qualified for the Wimbledon Championships for the first time in her career by defeating Julia Glushko, Maria Elena Camerin and Stéphanie Dubois for her first main draw in a Grand Slam tournament. In the first round, she was defeated by 25th seed Daniela Hantuchová in three sets. Vitalia was also defeated in the first round of the women's doubles with compatriot Maria Kondratieva, by Vera Dushevina and Ekaterina Makarova.

Seeded first at the GB Pro-Series event in Foxhills, she defeated fifth seed Marta Sirotkina in the quarterfinals. In her semifinal match, she retired whilst trailing 2–6, 0–2 to Johanna Konta.

On July 30, Diatchenko won the biggest singles title of her career so far at the President's Cup, an 100k tournament held in Astana. She beat sixth seed Akgul Amanmuradova in the final. She also won the women's doubles title with Galina Voskoboeva. They defeated Amanmuradova and Alexandra Panova in the final, also in two sets.

Vitalia participated in the Tatarstan Open in singles and doubles. Alexandra Panova was her doubles partner. Diatchenko was seeded fifth in the singles and first in the doubles. In the first round of the singles, she defeated Eugeniya Pashkova, in the second round Pemra Özgen, and in the quarterfinals Valentyna Ivakhnenko, all in straight sets. In the semifinals, Vitalia retired against wildcard and eventual champion, Yulia Putintseva, after suffering an ankle injury. In the doubles, after winning their first round and quarterfinal matches, Vitalia and Alexandra upset third seeds Evgeniya Rodina and Valeria Solovyeva in the semifinals. Due to suffering an injury in the semifinal match of the singles, Vitalia was unable to play the doubles final.

At the US Open, she beat Laura Siegemund in the first round of the qualifying stages, Sesil Karatantcheva also in two sets, and in the final round Marta Domachowska in three for a place in the main draw. It was the first time she qualified for the main draw of the US Open. In the first round, she was defeated by Zheng Jie.

In the Tashkent Open, she fought past Olga Govortsova in three sets before she lost to Alla Kudryavtseva in the second round. In the doubles, Vitalia and her partner Eleni Daniilidou beat Lyudmyla Kichenok and Nadiya Kichenok in the final, in straight sets. This was Vitalia's first time to win a WTA Tour doubles title in her career.

She qualified for the Ladies Linz where she lost in the first round to Ksenia Pervak.

Playing doubles at the Kremlin Cup, Vitalia suffered a knee injury which ruled her out from playing tennis for six months.

=== 2014: First WTA 125 title and singles career-high ===
After a brief appearance on the WTA Tour and a return to the ITF Circuit, she played her first notable game for years at the Kremlin Cup, where the 140-ranked Vitalia eliminated No. 14, Dominika Cibulková, in the round of 16, until being knocked down by Anastasia Pavlyuchenkova. Diatchenko completed the year by winning her first WTA 125 singles title at Taipei.

=== 2018: Wimbledon third round ===
In the first round of Wimbledon, she defeated former world No. 1, Maria Sharapova (ranked 22nd at the time). Diatchenko then defeated Sofia Kenin, advancing to the third round of a major tournament for the first time but Jeļena Ostapenko defeated her in straight sets.

=== 2023: Passport trouble ===
In April 2023, LOT Polish Airlines refused to board Diatchenko on a flight from Egypt to Corsica via Warsaw to play at a tournament, in line with travel restrictions for Russian passport holders introduced after the Russian invasion of Ukraine. Diatchenko confirmed that she was unable to reach her destination and then returned to Moscow.

== Performance timelines ==
Key
W	F	SF	QF	#R	RR	Q#	P#	DNQ	A	Z#	PO	G	S	B	NMS	NTI	P	NH

(W) winner; (F) finalist; (SF) semifinalist; (QF) quarterfinalist; (#R) rounds 4, 3, 2, 1; (RR) round-robin stage; (Q#) qualification round; (P#) preliminary round; (DNQ) did not qualify; (A) absent; (Z#) Davis/Fed Cup Zonal Group (with number indication) or (PO) play-off; (G) gold, (S) silver or (B) bronze Olympic/Paralympic medal; (NMS) not a Masters tournament; (NTI) not a Tier I tournament; (P) postponed; (NH) not held; (SR) strike rate (events won / competed); (W–L) win–loss record.
To avoid confusion and double counting, these charts are updated at the conclusion of a tournament or when the player's participation has ended.

Only main-draw results in WTA Tour, Grand Slam tournaments, Fed Cup and Olympic Games are included in win–loss records.

=== Singles ===
Tournament	2009	2010	2011	2012	2013	2014	2015	2016	2017	2018	2019	2020	2021	2022	2023	2024	W–L	Win%
Grand Slam tournaments
Australian Open	A	A	Q2	A	A	A	1R	A	A	A	Q2	1R	A	A	Q1	A	0–2	0%
French Open	2R	Q3	Q3	A	A	A	2R	1R	A	Q2	1R	1R	Q1	Q1	A	A	2–5	29%
Wimbledon	Q2	Q2	1R	Q1	A	Q1	1R	A	A	3R	1R	NH	1R	A (Note: Suspended due to politics.)	A	Q1	2–5	29%
US Open	Q2	Q2	1R	A	A	A	1R	1R	A	Q1	A	A	Q2	Q2	A	A	0–3	0%
Win–Loss	1–1	0–0	0–2	0–0	0–0	0–0	1–4	0–2	0–0	2–1	0–2	0–2	0–1	0–0	0–0	0–0	4–15	21%
WTA 1000
Dubai / Qatar Open (Note: The first Premier 5 event of the year has switched back and forth between the Dubai Tennis Championships and the Qatar Ladies Open since 2009. Dubai was classified as a Premier 5 event from 2009 to 2011 before being succeeded by Doha for the 2012–2014 period. In 2015, Dubai regained its Premier 5 status while Doha was demoted to Premier status. The Premier 5 tournaments were reclassified as WTA 1000 tournaments in 2021.)	A	Q1	Q1	A	A	Q1	A	A	A	A	A	A	A	A	A	A	0–0	–
Miami Open	A	A	A	A	A	A	A	A	A	A	Q1	NH	A	A	A	A	0–0	–
Madrid Open	Q1	A	A	A	A	A	A	A	A	A	A	NH	A	A	A	A	0–0	–
Cincinnati Open	A	A	A	A	A	A	A	A	A	A	A	Q1	A	A	A	A	0–0	–
Career statistics
Tournaments	5	1	5	1	0	1	8	3	1	3	5	5	6	3	0	0	Career total: 47	
Overall win–loss	2–5	0–1	1–5	1–1	0–0	2–1	2–8	0–3	0–1	2–3	1–5	0–5	1–6	2–3	0–0	0–0	14–47	23%
Year-end ranking	118	164	125	596	—	108	169	553	188	120	107	124	171	113	614	619	$1,802,903	

=== Doubles ===
Tournament	2010	2011	2012	2015	2016	2017	2018	2019	2020	2021	2022	W–L
Australian Open	A	1R	A	2R	A	A	A	A	A	A	A	1–2
French Open	A	1R	A	A	2R	A	A	2R	A	A	A	2–3
Wimbledon	A	1R	2R	A	A	A	A	1R	NH	1R	A	1–4
US Open	2R	2R	A	A	A	A	2R	A	A	A	A	3–3
Win–Loss	1–1	1–4	1–1	1–1	1–1	0–0	1–1	1–2	0–0	0–1	0–0	7–12

== WTA Tour finals ==
=== Doubles: 7 (1 title, 6 runner-ups) ===
Legend WTA 500 WTA 250 (1–6)	Finals by surface Hard (1–5) Clay (0–1)

Result	W–L	Date	Tournament	Tier	Surface	Partner	Opponents	Score
Loss	0–1	Feb 2009	Pattaya Open, Thailand	International (Note: The WTA International tournaments were reclassified as WTA 250 tournaments in 2021.)	Hard	(Ukraine) Yuliya Beygelzimer	(Thailand) Tamarine Tanasugarn (Kazakhstan) Yaroslava Shvedova	3–6, 2–6
Loss	0–2	Sep 2009	Tashkent Open, Uzbekistan	International	Hard	(Belarus) Ekaterina Dzehalevich	(Belarus) Tatiana Poutchek (Belarus) Olga Govortsova	2–6, 7–6^{(1)}, [8–10]
Loss	0–3	May 2010	Estoril Open, Portugal	International	Clay	(France) Aurélie Védy	(Spain) Anabel Medina Garrigues (Romania) Sorana Cîrstea	1–6, 5–7
Loss	0–4	Aug 2010	Danish Open, Denmark	International	Hard (i)	(Belarus) Tatiana Poutchek	(Germany) Julia Görges (Germany) Anna-Lena Grönefeld	4–6, 4–6
Win	1–4	Sep 2011	Tashkent Open, Uzbekistan	International	Hard	(Greece) Eleni Daniilidou	(Ukraine) Lyudmyla Kichenok (Ukraine) Nadiia Kichenok	6–4, 6–3
Loss	1–5	Jan 2015	Hobart International, Australia	International	Hard	(Romania) Monica Niculescu	(Netherlands) Kiki Bertens (Sweden) Johanna Larsson	5–7, 3–6
Loss	1–6	Aug 2015	Baku Cup, Azerbaijan	International	Hard	(Ukraine) Olga Savchuk	(Russia) Margarita Gasparyan (Russia) Alexandra Panova	3–6, 5–7

== WTA 125 finals ==
=== Singles: 3 (3 titles) ===
Result	W–L	Date	Tournament	Surface	Opponent	Score
Win	1–0	Nov 2014	Taipei Challenger, Taiwan	Carpet (i)	(Chinese Taipei) Chan Yung-jan	1–6, 6–2, 6–4
Win	2–0	Nov 2019	Taipei Challenger, Taiwan (2)	Carpet (i)	(Hungary) Tímea Babos	6–3, 6–2
Win	3–0	Dec 2021	Open Angers, France	Hard (i)	(China) Zhang Shuai	6–0, 6–4

=== Doubles: 2 (runner-ups) ===
Result	W–L	Date	Tournament	Surface	Partner	Opponents	Score
Loss	0–1	Jun 2022	Veneto Open, Italy	Grass	(Georgia (country)) Oksana Kalashnikova	(United States) Madison Brengle (United States) Claire Liu	4–6, 3–6
Loss	0–2	Jun 2025	Ilkley Open, United Kingdom	Grass	(United Kingdom) Eden Silva	(Netherlands) Isabelle Haverlag (Switzerland) Simona Waltert	1–6, 1–6

== ITF Circuit finals ==
=== Singles: 29 (22 titles, 7 runner-ups) ===
Legend $100,000 tournaments $75,000 tournaments $50/60,000 tournaments W40/50 tournaments $25,000 tournaments $10,000 tournaments	Finals by surface Hard (19–4) Clay (2–2) Grass (1–0) Carpet (0–1)

Result	W–L	Date	Tournament	Tier	Surface	Opponent	Score
Win	1–0	Nov 2007	ITF Redbridge, United Kingdom	10,000	Hard (i)	(Czech Republic) Iveta Gerlová	6–4, 6–0
Win	2–0	Dec 2008	Dubai Tennis Challenge, UAE	75,000	Hard	(Poland) Urszula Radwańska	7–5, 2–6, 7–5
Win	3–0	Mar 2009	ITF Moscow, Russia	25,000	Hard (i)	(Russia) Vesna Manasieva	2–6, 6–3, 4–1 ret.
Win	4–0	Jul 2010	ITF Darmstadt, Germany	25,000	Clay	(Germany) Julia Schruff	6–4, 5–7, 6–4
Loss	4–1	Aug 2010	Tatarstan Open, Russia	50,000	Hard	(Russia) Anna Lapushchenkova	1–6, 6–2, 6–7^{(4)}
Win	5–1	Jul 2011	President's Cup, Kazakhstan	100,000	Hard	(Uzbekistan) Akgul Amanmuradova	6–4, 6–1
Win	6–1	Dec 2013	Ankara Cup, Turkey	50,000	Hard (i)	(Russia) Marta Sirotkina	6–7^{(3)}, 6–4, 6–4
Win	7–1	Mar 2014	ITF Sharm El Sheikh, Egypt	10,000	Hard	(United Kingdom) Naomi Broady	3–6, 6–4, 6–1
Loss	7–2	Mar 2014	ITF Sharm El Sheikh, Egypt	10,000	Hard	(United Kingdom) Naomi Broady	2–6, 0–3 ret.
Loss	7–3	May 2014	ITF Moscow, Russia	25,000	Clay	(Ukraine) Anastasiya Vasylyeva	5–7, 4–6
Win	8–3	Jul 2014	President's Cup, Kazakhstan (2)	100,000	Hard	(Turkey) Çağla Büyükakçay	6–4, 3–6, 6–2
Win	9–3	Sep 2014	ITF Moscow, Russia (2)	25,000	Clay	(Russia) Evgeniya Rodina	6–3, 6–1
Loss	9–4	Sep 2014	Royal Cup, Montenegro	25,000	Clay	(Romania) Andreea Mitu	1–6, 4–6
Win	10–4	Jun 2015	Surbiton Trophy, UK	50,000	Grass	(Japan) Naomi Osaka	7–6^{(5)}, 6–0
Loss	10–5	Dec 2016	Ankara Cup, Turkey	50,000	Hard (i)	(Serbia) Ivana Jorović	4–6, 5–7
Win	11–5	Aug 2017	ITF Chiswick, UK	25,000	Hard	(Slovakia) Viktória Kužmová	6–3, 6–4
Win	12–5	Oct 2017	ITF Istanbul, Turkey	25,000	Hard (i)	(Romania) Jaqueline Cristian	6–3, 6–1
Win	13–5	Aug 2018	ITF Chiswick, UK (2)	25,000	Hard	(Greece) Valentini Grammatikopoulou	6–1, 7–5
Win	14–5	Feb 2019	Open de l'Isère, France	W25	Hard (i)	(France) Harmony Tan	6–1, 6–4
Win	15–5	Feb 2019	GB Pro-Series Shrewsbury, UK	W60	Hard (i)	(Belgium) Yanina Wickmayer	5–7, 6–1, 6–4
Win	16–5	Mar 2019	Open de Seine-et-Marne, France	W60	Hard (i)	(United States) Robin Anderson	6–2, 6–3
Win	17–5	Apr 2019	ITF Bolton, UK	W25	Hard (i)	(United Kingdom) Jodie Burrage	6–2, 6–2
Win	18–5	Apr 2019	Lale Cup Istanbul, Turkey	W60	Hard	(India) Ankita Raina	6–4, 6–0
Win	19–5	Sep 2019	ITF Penza, Russia	W25+H	Hard	(Russia) Kamilla Rakhimova	6–4, 6–1
Win	20–5	Feb 2022	ITF Macon, France	W25	Hard (i)	(Italy) Cristiana Ferrando	6–4, 6–3
Loss	20–6	Jun 2022	ITF Cantanhede, Portugal	W25	Carpet	(Portugal) Francisca Jorge	5–7, 5–7
Win	21–6	Jun 2022	ITF Santarem, Portugal	W25	Hard	(South Africa) Isabella Kruger	6–3, 6–2
Loss	21–7	May 2023	ITF Tbilisi, Georgia	W40	Hard	(Canada) Stacey Fung	4–6, ret.
Win	22–7	Jul 2025	ITF Corroios, Portugal	W50	Hard	(Japan) Aoi Ito	6–2, 6–3

=== Doubles: 22 (13 titles, 9 runner-ups) ===
Legend W100 tournaments 75,000 tournaments W50/75 tournaments W25/35 tournaments W10 tournaments	Finals by surface Hard (8–4) Clay (5–3) Carpet (0–2)

Result	W–L	Date	Tournament	Tier	Surface	Partner	Opponents	Score
Loss	0–1	Jun 2007	ITF Sarajevo, Bosnia and Herzogevina	10,000	Clay	(Croatia) Tamara Stojković	(Russia) Vasilisa Davydova (Serbia) Karolina Jovanović	6–1, 0–6, 0–6
Win	1–1	Aug 2008	ITF Moscow, Russia	75,000	Clay	(Russia) Maria Kondratieva	(Ukraine) Veronika Kapshay (Latvia) Irina Kuzmina	6–0, 6–4
Win	2–1	Aug 2008	ITF Moscow, Russia	25,000	Clay	(Russia) Eugeniya Pashkova	(Slovenia) Tadeja Majerič (Russia) Natalia Ryzhonkova	6–0, 6–1
Loss	2–2	Sep 2008	ITF Ruse, Bulgaria	25,000	Clay	(Russia) Eugeniya Pashkova	(Russia) Alexandra Panova (Russia) Ksenia Pervak	2–6, 7–6^{(5)}, [5–10]
Loss	2–3	Mar 2009	ITF Minsk, Belarus	25,000	Carpet (i)	(Russia) Eugeniya Pashkova	(Belarus) Ima Bohush (Belarus) Darya Kustova	1–6, 6–4, [8–10]
Win	3–3	Mar 2009	ITF Moscow, Russia	25,000	Hard	(Belarus) Ekaterina Dzehalevich	(Ukraine) Lyudmyla Kichenok (Ukraine) Nadiya Kichenok	6–1, 6–1
Loss	3–4	Mar 2010	ITF Minsk, Belarus	25,000	Hard	(Estonia) Maret Ani	(Russia) Elena Bovina (France) Irena Pavlovic	0–6, 1–6
Win	4–4	Apr 2010	Soweto Open, South Africa	100,000	Hard	(Greece) Irini Georgatou	(New Zealand) Marina Erakovic (Thailand) Tamarine Tanasugarn	6–3, 5–7, [16–14]
Win	5–4	Jul 2010	ITF Darmstadt, Germany	25,000	Clay	(Germany) Laura Siegemund	(Romania) Irina-Camelia Begu (Japan) Erika Sema	4–6, 6–1, [10–4]
Win	6–4	Sep 2010	GB Pro-Series Shrewsbury, UK	75,000	Hard	(France) Irena Pavlovic	(France) Claire Feuerstein (Russia) Vesna Manasieva	4–6, 6–4, [10–6]
Win	7–4	Oct 2010	ITF Athens Open, Greece	50,000	Hard	(Turkey) İpek Şenoğlu	(Greece) Eleni Daniilidou (Croatia) Petra Martić	w/o
Win	8–4	Jul 2011	President's Cup, Kazakhstan	100,000	Hard	(Kazakhstan) Galina Voskoboeva	(Uzbekistan) Akgul Amanmuradova (Russia) Alexandra Panova	6–3, 6–4
Loss	8–5	Aug 2011	Tatarstan Open, Russia	50,000	Hard	(Russia) Alexandra Panova	(Russia) Ekaterina Lopes (Slovenia) Andreja Klepač	w/o
Win	9–5	Nov 2013	Dubai Tennis Challenge, UAE	75,000	Hard	(Ukraine) Olga Savchuk	(Ukraine) Lyudmyla Kichenok (Ukraine) Nadiya Kichenok	7–5, 6–1
Win	10–5	Jul 2014	President's Cup, Kazakhstan	100,000	Hard	(Russia) Margarita Gasparyan	(Belgium) Michaela Boëv (Germany) Anna-Lena Friedsam	6–4, 6–1
Win	11–5	Aug 2014	Neva Cup, Russia	25,000	Clay	(Belarus) Ilona Kremen	(Russia) Natela Dzalamidze (Russia) Anastasia Pivovarova	6–1, 6–3
Win	12–5	Nov 2014	Dubai Tennis Challenge, UAE	75,000	Hard	(Russia) Alexandra Panova	(Ukraine) Lyudmyla Kichenok (Ukraine) Olga Savchuk	3–6, 6–2, [10–4]
Win	13–5	May 2016	ITF La Marsa, Tunisia	25,000	Clay	(Kazakhstan) Galina Voskoboeva	(Russia) Victoria Kan (Uzbekistan) Sabina Sharipova	6–3, 1–6, [12–10]
Loss	13–6	Jul 2024	ITF Don Benito, Spain	W35	Carpet	(United States) Isabella Barrera	(Austria) Tamara Kostic (Spain) Olga Parres Azcoitia	6–3, 4–6, [6–10]
Loss	13–7	Jul 2024	President's Cup, Kazakhstan	W35	Hard	(Kazakhstan) Zhanel Rustemova	(Russia) Anastasia Gasanova (Russia) Ekaterina Shalimova	6–7^{(4)}, 6–2, [7–10]
Loss	13–8	May 2025	Zagreb Open, Croatia	W75	Clay	(Croatia) Lucija Ćirić Bagarić	(Portugal) Francisca Jorge (Portugal) Matilde Jorge	2–6, 0–6
Loss	13–9	May 2026	ITF Lopota, Georgia	W50	Hard	Alina Yuneva	Maria Golovina; Ekaterina Maklakova	4–6, 3–6
