= 2011 Tatarstan Open – Doubles =

Doubles
- 2011 Tatarstan Open

Final
- Champion: (Russia) Ekaterina Ivanova (Slovenia) Andreja Klepač
- Runner-up: (Russia) Vitalia Diatchenko (Russia) Alexandra Panova
- Score: w/o

Events
Singles	Doubles
- Tatarstan Open

Ekaterina Dzehalevich and Lesia Tsurenko were the defending champions, but both chose not to participate.

Ekaterina Ivanova and Andreja Klepač won the title when Vitalia Diatchenko and Alexandra Panova withdrew from the final.

== Seeds ==
1. (Russia) Vitalia Diatchenko / (Russia) Alexandra Panova (final, withdrew)
2. (Russia) Ekaterina Ivanova / (Slovenia) Andreja Klepač (champions)
3. (Russia) Evgeniya Rodina / (Russia) Valeriya Solovyeva (semifinals)
4. (Ukraine) Tetyana Arefyeva / (Russia) Eugeniya Pashkova (first round)

== Draw ==
Key

- Q = Qualifier
- WC = Wild card
- LL = Lucky loser
- Alt = Alternate
- ITF = ITF entry
- PR = Protected ranking
- SR = Special ranking
- SE = Special exempt
- JE = Junior exempt
- JR = Junior Accelerator Programme entrant
- CO = College Accelerator Programme entrant
- NG = Next Gen Accelerator Program entrant
- w/o = Walkover
- r = Retired
- d = Defaulted

=== Draw ===
First round
1	(Russia) V Diatchenko (Russia) A Panova	6	6
(Turkey) Ç Büyükakçay (Turkey) P Özgen	2	3
(Uzbekistan) N Abduraimova (Russia) E Yashina	6	7
Q	(Uzbekistan) V Ekshibarova (Russia) E Kulikova	3	5
3	(Russia) E Rodina (Russia) V Solovieva	6	6
WC	(Russia) V Kudermetova (Russia) P Novoselova	0	1
Q	(Russia) A Gabueva (Ukraine) A Sotnikova	3	6^{5}
(Russia) A Artamonova (Romania) M Buzărnescu	6	7^{7}
WC	(Russia) V Kuznetsova (Russia) S Shaydullina	1	1
(Russia) N Dzalamidze (Luxembourg) M Minella	6	6
(Russia) K Lykina (Russia) M Sirotkina	4	6	[15]
4	(Ukraine) T Arefyeva (Russia) E Pashkova	6	2	[13]
(Russia) M Shamayko (Russia) M Zharkova	3	5
(Netherlands) R Hogenkamp (Russia) T Kotelnikova	6	7
(Ukraine) V Ivakhnenko (Ukraine) K Kozlova	1	3
2	(Russia) E Ivanova (Slovenia) A Klepač	6	6

Quarterfinals
1	(Russia) V Diatchenko (Russia) A Panova	6	6
(Uzbekistan) N Abduraimova (Russia) E Yashina	3	3
3	(Russia) E Rodina (Russia) V Solovieva	6	6
(Russia) A Artamonova (Romania) M Buzărnescu	4	1
(Russia) N Dzalamidze (Luxembourg) M Minella	5	4
(Russia) K Lykina (Russia) M Sirotkina	7	6
(Netherlands) R Hogenkamp (Russia) T Kotelnikova	4	4
2	(Russia) E Ivanova (Slovenia) A Klepač	6	6

Semifinals
1	(Russia) V Diatchenko (Russia) A Panova	6	6
3	(Russia) E Rodina (Russia) V Solovieva	3	2
(Russia) K Lykina (Russia) M Sirotkina	3	1
2	(Russia) E Ivanova (Slovenia) A Klepač	6	6

Finals
1	(Russia) V Diatchenko (Russia) A Panova
2	(Russia) E Ivanova (Slovenia) A Klepač	w/o
