= Tatarstan Open =

Former women's tennis tournament held in Kazan, Russia

ITF Women's Tour
- Event name: Kazan
- Location: Kazan, Russia
- Venue: Kazan Tennis Academy
- Category: ITF Women's Circuit
- Surface: Hard
- Draw: 32S/32Q/16D
- Prize money: $25,000
- Website: Official website

The Tatarstan Open is a tournament for professional female tennis players played on outdoor hardcourts. The event is classified as a $25,000 ITF Women's Circuit tournament and has been held in Kazan, Russia, since 2010. It had previously been a $50,000 event.

== Past finals ==
=== Singles ===
Year	Champion	Runner-up	Score
2021	(Belarus) Anna Kubareva	(Greece) Valentini Grammatikopoulou	6–1, 6–3
2019–20	Not held		
2018	(Russia) Daria Mishina	(Russia) Valeriya Yushchenko	6–3, 6–1
2016–17	Not held		
2015	(Russia) Viktoria Kamenskaya	(Russia) Alena Tarasova	6–1, 6–3
2014	(Russia) Natela Dzalamidze	(Russia) Marta Paigina	6–2, 6–2
2013	(Germany) Anna-Lena Friedsam	(Russia) Marta Sirotkina	6–2, 6–3
2012	(Ukraine) Kateryna Kozlova	(United Kingdom) Tara Moore	6–3, 6–3
2011	(Russia) Yulia Putintseva	(France) Caroline Garcia	6–4, 6–2
2010	(Russia) Anna Lapushchenkova	(Russia) Vitalia Diatchenko	6–1, 2–6, 7–6^{(7–4)}

=== Doubles ===
Year	Champions	Runners-up	Score
2021	(Uzbekistan) Nigina Abduraimova (Russia) Angelina Gabueva	(Belarus) Iryna Shymanovich (Belarus) Shalimar Talbi	6–2, 7–6^{(7–5)}
2019–20	Not held		
2018	(Russia) Maria Krupenina (Russia) Anastasia Tikhonova	(Russia) Daria Mishina (Russia) Noel Saidenova	4–6, 6–3, [10–8]
2016–17	Not held		
2015	(Ukraine) Oleksandra Korashvili (Russia) Polina Leykina	(Russia) Anastasia Frolova (Uzbekistan) Polina Merenkova	walkover
2014	(Russia) Natela Dzalamidze (Russia) Alena Tarasova	(Russia) Kseniia Bekker (Russia) Anastasia Frolova	6–1, 6–1
2013	(Ukraine) Valentina Ivakhnenko (Ukraine) Kateryna Kozlova	(Turkey) Başak Eraydın (Ukraine) Veronika Kapshay	6–4, 6–1
2012	(Ukraine) Valentina Ivakhnenko (Ukraine) Kateryna Kozlova	(Ukraine) Lyudmyla Kichenok (Ukraine) Nadiia Kichenok	6–4, 6–7^{(6–8)}, [10–4]
2011	(Russia) Ekaterina Ivanova (Slovenia) Andreja Klepač	(Russia) Vitalia Diatchenko (Russia) Alexandra Panova	walkover
2010	(Belarus) Ekaterina Dzehalevich (Ukraine) Lesia Tsurenko	(Uzbekistan) Albina Khabibulina (Kyrgyzstan) Ksenia Palkina	6–2, 6–3
