= 2011 Aegon GB Pro-Series Shrewsbury – Doubles =

Doubles
- 2011 Aegon GB Pro-Series Shrewsbury

Final
- Champions: (Portugal) Maria João Koehler (Hungary) Katalin Marosi
- Runners-up: (United Kingdom) Amanda Elliott (Australia) Johanna Konta
- Score: 7–6^{(7–3)}, 6–1

Events
Singles	Doubles
← 2010 ·	Aegon GB Pro-Series Shrewsbury	· 2012 →

Vitalia Diatchenko and Irena Pavlovic were the defending champions, but both players chose not to participate.
Maria João Koehler and Katalin Marosi won the title, defeating Amanda Elliott and Johanna Konta 7–6^{(7–3)}, 6–1 in the final.

== Seeds ==
1. (Germany) Kristina Barrois / (Germany) Tatjana Malek (quarterfinals)
2. (Russia) Vesna Dolonts / (Russia) Evgeniya Rodina (quarterfinals)
3. (United Kingdom) Naomi Broady / (France) Kristina Mladenovic (semifinals)
4. (France) Claire Feuerstein / (France) Victoria Larrière (first round)

== Draw ==
=== Key ===
- Q = Qualifier
- WC = Wild card
- LL = Lucky loser
- Alt = Alternate
- SE = Special exempt
- PR = Protected ranking
- ITF = ITF entry
- JE = Junior exempt
- w/o = Walkover
- r = Retired
- d = Defaulted
- SR = Special ranking

=== Draw ===
First round
1	(Germany) K Barrois (Germany) T Malek	6	6
WC	(United Kingdom) G Bastick (United Kingdom) A Gibson	2	0
(Luxembourg) A Kremer (United Kingdom) H Watson	6	6
(Greece) E Georgatou (Israel) J Glushko	3	2
4	(France) C Feuerstein (France) V Larrière	2	3
(Portugal) MJ Koehler (Hungary) K Marosi	6	6
WC	(United Kingdom) L Brown (United Kingdom) Y Clarke	3	2
(United Kingdom) A Fitzpatrick (United Kingdom) J Windley	6	6
(Russia) E Bychkova (Russia) M Sirotkina	6	6
(United Kingdom) T Moore (United Kingdom) L Whybourn	4	4
WC	(United Kingdom) L McMinn (United Kingdom) E Southall	1	2
3	(United Kingdom) N Broady (France) K Mladenovic	6	6
(United Kingdom) A Elliott (Australia) J Konta	6	6
Alt	(United Kingdom) L Fox (Germany) N Geuer	3	4
(Belgium) K Flipkens (United Kingdom) A Keothavong	2	6^{5}
2	(Russia) V Dolonts (Russia) E Rodina	6	7^{7}

Quarterfinals
1	(Germany) K Barrois (Germany) T Malek	6	3	[4]
(Luxembourg) A Kremer (United Kingdom) H Watson	4	6	[10]
(Portugal) MJ Koehler (Hungary) K Marosi	6	4	[10]
(United Kingdom) A Fitzpatrick (United Kingdom) J Windley	2	6	[8]
(Russia) E Bychkova (Russia) M Sirotkina	2	5
3	(United Kingdom) N Broady (France) K Mladenovic	6	7
(United Kingdom) A Elliott (Australia) J Konta	4	6	[18]
2	(Russia) V Dolonts (Russia) E Rodina	6	3	[16]

Semifinals
(Luxembourg) A Kremer (United Kingdom) H Watson	5	4
(Portugal) MJ Koehler (Hungary) K Marosi	7	6
3	(United Kingdom) N Broady (France) K Mladenovic	4	3
(United Kingdom) A Elliott (Australia) J Konta	6	6

Finals
(Portugal) MJ Koehler (Hungary) K Marosi	7^{7}	6
(United Kingdom) A Elliott (Australia) J Konta	6^{3}	1
