= 2011 Aegon GB Pro-Series Shrewsbury =

- Date: 19–25 September
- Edition: 4th
- Surface: Hard
- Location: Shrewsbury, Great Britain

Champions

Singles
- (Germany) Mona Barthel

Doubles
- (Portugal) Maria João Koehler / (Hungary) Katalin Marosi
← 2010 ·	Aegon GB Pro-Series Shrewsbury	· 2012 →

The 2011 Aegon GB Pro-Series Shrewsbury was a professional tennis tournament played on hard courts. It was the fourth edition of the tournament which was part of the 2011 ITF Women's Circuit. It took place in Shrewsbury, Great Britain between 19 and 25 September 2011.

== WTA entrants ==
=== Seeds ===
Country	Player	Rank^{1}	Seed
GER	Mona Barthel	86	1
GER	Kristina Barrois	88	2
RUS	Evgeniya Rodina	90	3
RUS	Vesna Dolonts	95	4
GBR	Anne Keothavong	99	5
GBR	Heather Watson	107	6
RUS	Vitalia Diatchenko	131	7
BEL	Kirsten Flipkens	144	8

- ^{1} Rankings are as of September 12, 2011.

=== Other entrants ===
The following players received wildcards into the singles main draw:

- (United Kingdom) Yasmin Clarke
- (United Kingdom) Nicola George
- (United Kingdom) Heather Watson
- (United Kingdom) Lisa Whybourn

The following players received entry from the qualifying draw:

- (France) Céline Cattaneo
- (Germany) Nicola Geuer
- (France) Elixane Lechemia
- (United Kingdom) Tara Moore

== Champions ==
=== Singles ===
(Germany) Mona Barthel def. (United Kingdom) Heather Watson, 6–0, 6–3

=== Doubles ===
(Portugal) Maria João Koehler / (Hungary) Katalin Marosi def. (United Kingdom) Amanda Elliott / (Australia) Johanna Konta, 7–6^{(7–3)}, 6–1
