= 2012 Viccourt Cup – Doubles =

Doubles
- 2012 Viccourt Cup

Final
- Champions: (Ukraine) Lyudmyla Kichenok (Ukraine) Nadiya Kichenok
- Runners-up: (Ukraine) Valentyna Ivakhnenko (Ukraine) Kateryna Kozlova
- Score: 6–2, 7–5

Events
| Singles | Doubles |
| ← 2011 · | Viccourt Cup | · 2013 → |

This was the first edition of the event.

Lyudmyla Kichenok and Nadiya Kichenok won the title defeating Valentyna Ivakhnenko and Kateryna Kozlova in the final 6–2, 7–5.

== Seeds ==
1. (Ukraine) Lyudmyla Kichenok / (Ukraine) Nadiya Kichenok (champions)
2. (Ukraine) Valentyna Ivakhnenko / (Ukraine) Kateryna Kozlova (final)
3. (Serbia) Vesna Dolonc / (Russia) Ekaterina Ivanova (semifinals)
4. (Russia) Alla Kudryavtseva / (Belarus) Anastasiya Yakimova (semifinals)

== Draw ==
=== Key ===
- Q = Qualifier
- WC = Wild card
- LL = Lucky loser
- Alt = Alternate
- SE = Special exempt
- PR = Protected ranking
- ITF = ITF entry
- JE = Junior exempt
- w/o = Walkover
- r = Retired
- d = Defaulted
- SR = Special ranking

=== Draw ===
First round
1 | (Ukraine) L Kichenok (Ukraine) N Kichenok | 6 | 6
(Ukraine) A Fomina (Belarus) V Kuzmenkova | 3 | 2
(Ukraine) M Zakarlyuk (Ukraine) T Zakarlyuk | 1 | 5
(Poland) M Domachowska (Ukraine) A Sotnikova | 6 | 7
3 | (Serbia) V Dolonc (Russia) E Ivanova | 6 | 6
(Ukraine) M Kolb (Ukraine) N Kolb | 4 | 0
(Ukraine) O Ianchuk (Georgia (country)) S Kvatsabaia | 6^{6} | 6 | [9]
(Ukraine) A Kyrylova (Israel) E Masuri | 7^{8} | 4 | [11]
WC | (Ukraine) A Fedoryshyn (Ukraine) O Koshman | 0 | 6 | [11]
(Belarus) L Marozava (Belarus) P Pekhova | 6 | 4 | [9]
WC | (Ukraine) D Bogoliy (Ukraine) G Poznikhirenko
4 | (Russia) A Kudryavtseva (Belarus) A Yakimova | w/o
(Hungary) V Bulgakova (Ukraine) E Ianchuk | 5 | 6^{3}
WC | (Ukraine) O Korashvili (Ukraine) V Lushkova | 7 | 7^{7}
(Luxembourg) A Kremer (Lithuania) L Stančiūtė | 4 | 2
2 | (Ukraine) V Ivakhnenko (Ukraine) K Kozlova | 6 | 6

Quarterfinals
1 | (Ukraine) L Kichenok (Ukraine) N Kichenok | 6 | 4 | [10]
(Poland) M Domachowska (Ukraine) A Sotnikova | 0 | 6 | [4]
3 | (Serbia) V Dolonc (Russia) E Ivanova | 6 | 6
(Ukraine) A Kyrylova (Israel) E Masuri | 2 | 3
WC | (Ukraine) A Fedoryshyn (Ukraine) O Koshman
4 | (Russia) A Kudryavtseva (Belarus) A Yakimova | w/o
WC | (Ukraine) O Korashvili (Ukraine) V Lushkova | 3 | 4
2 | (Ukraine) V Ivakhnenko (Ukraine) K Kozlova | 6 | 6

Semifinals
1 | (Ukraine) L Kichenok (Ukraine) N Kichenok | 3 | 6 | [10]
3 | (Serbia) V Dolonc (Russia) E Ivanova | 6 | 1 | [2]
4 | (Russia) A Kudryavtseva (Belarus) A Yakimova | 3 | 1
2 | (Ukraine) V Ivakhnenko (Ukraine) K Kozlova | 6 | 6

Finals
1 | (Ukraine) L Kichenok (Ukraine) N Kichenok | 6 | 7
2 | (Ukraine) V Ivakhnenko (Ukraine) K Kozlova | 2 | 5
