= 2013 Viccourt Cup – Doubles =

Doubles
- 2013 Viccourt Cup

Final
- Champions: (Ukraine) Yuliya Beygelzimer (Czech Republic) Renata Voráčová
- Runners-up: (Serbia) Vesna Dolonc (Russia) Alexandra Panova
- Score: 6–1, 6–4

Events
Singles	Doubles
← 2012 ·	Viccourt Cup	· 2014 →

Lyudmyla and Nadiya Kichenok were the defending champions, having won the event in 2012, but they lost in the quarterfinals.

Yuliya Beygelzimer and Renata Voráčová won the tournament, defeating Vesna Dolonc and Alexandra Panova in the final, 6–1, 6–4.

== Seeds ==
1. (Serbia) Vesna Dolonc / (Russia) Alexandra Panova (final)
2. (Ukraine) Yuliya Beygelzimer / (Czech Republic) Renata Voráčová (champions)
3. (Ukraine) Lyudmyla Kichenok / (Ukraine) Nadiya Kichenok (quarterfinals)
4. (Poland) Paula Kania / (Belarus) Polina Pekhova (semifinals)

== Draw ==
=== Key ===
- Q = Qualifier
- WC = Wild card
- LL = Lucky loser
- Alt = Alternate
- SE = Special exempt
- PR = Protected ranking
- ITF = ITF entry
- JE = Junior exempt
- w/o = Walkover
- r = Retired
- d = Defaulted
- SR = Special ranking

First round
1	(Serbia) V Dolonc (Russia) A Panova	6	4	[10]
(Belarus) L Marozava (Germany) C Shakovets	1	6	[3]
(United States) J Cohen (Russia) E Yashina	6	6
WC	(Kazakhstan) K Kerimbayeva (Ukraine) A Petrova	2	3
4	(Poland) P Kania (Belarus) P Pekhova	6	6
WC	(Russia) D Gavrilova (Ukraine) H Ploskina	0	3
(Uzbekistan) N Abduraimova (Belarus) I Kremen	6^{5}	2
WC	(Ukraine) A Fedoryshyn (Ukraine) A Kalinina	7^{7}	6
(Russia) E Bychkova (Kazakhstan) K Pervak	6	6^{3}	[10]
(Uzbekistan) A Khabibulina (Ukraine) A Vasylyeva	4	7^{7}	[6]
(Czech Republic) Kr Plíšková (Ukraine) E Svitolina	2	6	[7]
3	(Ukraine) L Kichenok (Ukraine) N Kichenok	6	3	[10]
(Ukraine) V Ivakhnenko (Ukraine) K Kozlova	6	4	[8]
(Ukraine) V Kapshay (Serbia) A Krunić	4	6	[10]
(Ukraine) A Fomina (Georgia (country)) S Shapatava	2	3
2	(Ukraine) Y Beygelzimer (Czech Republic) R Voráčová	6	6

Quarterfinals
1	(Serbia) V Dolonc (Russia) A Panova	6	6
(United States) J Cohen (Russia) E Yashina	1	1
4	(Poland) P Kania (Belarus) P Pekhova	6	6
WC	(Ukraine) A Fedoryshyn (Ukraine) A Kalinina	1	3
(Russia) E Bychkova (Kazakhstan) K Pervak	6^{4}	6	[11]
3	(Ukraine) L Kichenok (Ukraine) N Kichenok	7^{7}	3	[9]
(Ukraine) V Kapshay (Serbia) A Krunić	1	5
2	(Ukraine) Y Beygelzimer (Czech Republic) R Voráčová	6	7

Semifinals
1	(Serbia) V Dolonc (Russia) A Panova	6	4	[10]
4	(Poland) P Kania (Belarus) P Pekhova	4	6	[8]
(Russia) E Bychkova (Kazakhstan) K Pervak	0	1
2	(Ukraine) Y Beygelzimer (Czech Republic) R Voráčová	6	6

Final
1	(Serbia) V Dolonc (Russia) A Panova	1	4
2	(Ukraine) Y Beygelzimer (Czech Republic) R Voráčová	6	6
