= 2011 International Country Cuneo – Doubles =

Doubles
- 2011 International Country Cuneo

Final
- Champion: (Luxembourg) Mandy Minella (Switzerland) Stefanie Vögele
- Runner-up: (Czech Republic) Eva Birnerová (Russia) Vesna Dolonts
- Score: 6–3, 6–2

Events
Singles	Doubles
← 2010 ·	International Country Cuneo	· 2012 →

Eva Birnerová and Lucie Hradecká were the defending champions, but Hradecká chose not to participate. Birnerová partnered up with Vesna Dolonts, but lost in the final to Mandy Minella and Stefanie Vögele 6–3, 6–2.

== Seeds ==
1. (Croatia) Petra Martić / (Turkey) İpek Şenoğlu (semifinals)
2. (Italy) Maria Elena Camerin / (France) Alizé Cornet (quarterfinals)
3. (Russia) Elena Bovina / (France) Aurélie Védy (first round)
4. (Austria) Yvonne Meusburger / (Germany) Kathrin Wörle (first round)

== Draw ==
=== Key ===
- Q = Qualifier
- WC = Wild card
- LL = Lucky loser
- Alt = Alternate
- SE = Special exempt
- PR = Protected ranking
- ITF = ITF entry
- JE = Junior exempt
- w/o = Walkover
- r = Retired
- d = Defaulted
- SR = Special ranking

=== Draw ===
First round
1	(Croatia) P Martić (Turkey) İ Şenoğlu	6	6
(Argentina) M Auroux (Italy) N Clerico	4	1
(Spain) E Fernández-Brugués (France) L Thorpe	6^{3}	6	[10]
(Italy) B Davato (Spain) L Pous Tió	7	2	[5]
4	(Austria) Y Meusburger (Germany) K Wörle	6^{2}	2
(Croatia) M Lučić (Georgia (country)) A Tatishvili	7	6
(Luxembourg) M Minella (Switzerland) S Vögele	6	6
(Italy) A Floris (Czech Republic) S Záhlavová	1	0
(Italy) M Masini (Italy) A-G Remondina	1	6	[6]
(Netherlands) A Rus (Belarus) A Yakimova	6	3	[10]
(Croatia) M Abramović (Australia) D Dominikovic	2	6	[10]
3/WC	(Russia) E Bovina (France) A Védy	6	2	[1]
(Czech Republic) E Birnerová (Russia) V Dolonts	6	6
WC	(Italy) G Gatto-Monticone (Italy) F Quercia	2	2
(Italy) G Marchetti (Italy) C Rosatello	2	4
2	(Italy) ME Camerin (France) A Cornet	6	6

Quarterfinals
1	(Croatia) P Martić (Turkey) İ Şenoğlu	6	6
(Spain) E Fernández-Brugués (France) L Thorpe	3	3
(Croatia) M Lučić (Georgia (country)) A Tatishvili	5	6	[10]
(Luxembourg) M Minella (Switzerland) S Vögele	7	1	[12]
(Netherlands) A Rus (Belarus) A Yakimova	6	2	[16]
(Croatia) M Abramović (Australia) D Dominikovic	1	6	[14]
(Czech Republic) E Birnerová (Russia) V Dolonts	6	6
2	(Italy) ME Camerin (France) A Cornet	3	3

Semifinals
1	(Croatia) P Martić (Turkey) İ Şenoğlu	6	3	[8]
(Luxembourg) M Minella (Switzerland) S Vögele	4	6	[10]
(Netherlands) A Rus (Belarus) A Yakimova	1	3
(Czech Republic) E Birnerová (Russia) V Dolonts	6	6

Finals
(Luxembourg) M Minella (Switzerland) S Vögele	6	6
(Czech Republic) E Birnerová (Russia) V Dolonts	3	2
