= 2011 Aegon GB Pro-Series Shrewsbury – Singles =

Singles
- 2011 Aegon GB Pro-Series Shrewsbury

Final
- Champion: (Germany) Mona Barthel
- Runner-up: (United Kingdom) Heather Watson
- Score: 6–0, 6–3

Events
Singles	Doubles
← 2010 ·	Aegon GB Pro-Series Shrewsbury	· 2012 →

Eva Birnerová was the defending champion, but chose not to participate.
Mona Barthel won the title, defeating Heather Watson 6–0, 6–3 in the final.

== Seeds ==
1. (Germany) Mona Barthel (champion)
2. (Germany) Kristina Barrois (first round)
3. (Russia) Evgeniya Rodina (second round)
4. (Russia) Vesna Dolonts (first round)
5. (United Kingdom) Anne Keothavong (quarterfinals)
6. (United Kingdom) Heather Watson (final)
7. (Russia) Vitalia Diatchenko (quarterfinals)
8. (Belgium) Kirsten Flipkens (first round)

== Main draw ==
=== Key ===
- Q = Qualifier
- WC = Wild card
- LL = Lucky loser
- Alt = Alternate
- SE = Special exempt
- PR = Protected ranking
- ITF = ITF entry
- JE = Junior exempt
- w/o = Walkover
- r = Retired
- d = Defaulted
- SR = Special ranking

=== Finals ===
Semifinals
1	(Germany) Mona Barthel	6	6
(Russia) Ekaterina Bychkova	2	3
(Germany) Annika Beck	1	3
6/WC	(United Kingdom) Heather Watson	6	6

Final
1	(Germany) Mona Barthel	6	6
6/WC	(United Kingdom) Heather Watson	0	3

=== Top half ===
First round
1	(Germany) M Barthel	6	6
(France) K Mladenovic	2	1
WC	(United Kingdom) N George	2	6	6^{3}
(Russia) M Sirotkina	6	0	7^{7}
Q	(France) C Cattaneo	3	4
(Greece) E Georgatou	6	6
(Ukraine) T Arefyeva	1	2
5	(United Kingdom) A Keothavong	6	6
3	(Russia) E Rodina	6	6
Q	(France) E Lechémia	2	3
(Russia) E Bychkova	7^{7}	7
(Luxembourg) A Kremer	6^{3}	5
WC	(United Kingdom) Y Clarke	1	0
(Germany) S Gronert	6	6
(Germany) T Malek	7	6^{3}	6
8	(Belgium) K Flipkens	5	7^{7}	1

Second round
1	(Germany) M Barthel	6	6
(Russia) M Sirotkina	2	4
(Greece) E Georgatou	3	1
5	(United Kingdom) A Keothavong	6	6
3	(Russia) E Rodina	6	0	3
(Russia) E Bychkova	4	6	6
(Germany) S Gronert	5	2
(Germany) T Malek	7	6

Quarterfinals
1	(Germany) M Barthel	6	6
5	(United Kingdom) A Keothavong	1	4
(Russia) E Bychkova	5	7^{7}	6
(Germany) T Malek	7	6^{5}	3

Semifinals
1	(Germany) M Barthel	6	6
(Russia) E Bychkova	2	3

=== Bottom half ===
First round
7	(Russia) V Diatchenko	6	6
(Israel) J Glushko	2	2
WC	(United Kingdom) L Whybourn	5	6	3
(France) V Larrière	7	2	6
(Germany) A Beck	6	6
Q	(Germany) N Geuer	4	2
(Australia) J Konta	6	6
4	(Russia) V Dolonts	3	3
6/WC	(United Kingdom) H Watson	6	6
(France) A Laurendon	3	2
Q	(United Kingdom) T Moore	6	7^{8}
(Portugal) MJ Koehler	3	6^{6}
(France) C Feuerstein	6	6
(Switzerland) C Perrin	1	2
(United Kingdom) N Broady	6	3	7^{7}
2	(Germany) K Barrois	3	6	6^{5}

Second round
7	(Russia) V Diatchenko	6^{2}	6	7^{7}
(France) V Larrière	7^{7}	4	6^{4}
(Germany) A Beck	6	6
(Australia) J Konta	3	4
6/WC	(United Kingdom) H Watson	6	6
Q	(United Kingdom) T Moore	2	2
(France) C Feuerstein	3	1
(United Kingdom) N Broady	6	6

Quarterfinals
7	(Russia) V Diatchenko	4	0^{r}
(Germany) A Beck	6	3
6/WC	(United Kingdom) H Watson	7	6^{6}	6
(United Kingdom) N Broady	5	7^{8}	3

Semifinals
(Germany) A Beck	1	3
6/WC	(United Kingdom) H Watson	6	6
