= 2012 Viccourt Cup – Singles =

Tennis competition

Singles
- 2012 Viccourt Cup

Final
- Champion: (Serbia) Vesna Dolonc
- Runner-up: (Portugal) Maria João Koehler
- Score: 6–2, 6–3

Events
Singles	Doubles
← 2011 ·	Viccourt Cup	· 2013 →

This was the first edition of the tournament.

Vesna Dolonc won the title, defeating Maria João Koehler in the final, 6–2, 6–3.

== Seeds ==
1. (Czech Republic) Andrea Hlaváčková (quarterfinals)
2. (Belarus) Anastasiya Yakimova (first round)
3. (Russia) Alla Kudryavtseva (quarterfinals)
4. (Ukraine) Elina Svitolina (semifinals)
5. (Portugal) Maria João Koehler (final)
6. (Poland) Marta Domachowska (semifinals)
7. (Turkey) Çağla Büyükakçay (first round)
8. (Russia) Ekaterina Ivanova (quarterfinals)

== Draw ==
=== Key ===
- Q = Qualifier
- WC = Wild card
- LL = Lucky loser
- Alt = Alternate
- SE = Special exempt
- PR = Protected ranking
- ITF = ITF entry
- JE = Junior exempt
- w/o = Walkover
- r = Retired
- d = Defaulted
- SR = Special ranking

=== Finals ===
Semifinals
5	(Portugal) Maria João Koehler	6	6
6	(Poland) Marta Domachowska	2	1
4	(Ukraine) Elina Svitolina	1	5
(Serbia) Vesna Dolonc	6	7

Final
5	(Portugal) Maria João Koehler	2	3
(Serbia) Vesna Dolonc	6	6

=== Top half ===
First round
1	(Czech Republic) A Hlaváčková	6	7^{8}
(Slovakia) K Kučová	1	6^{6}
(Belarus) P Pekhova	7	6
WC	(Ukraine) O Koshman	5	3
(Ukraine) O Ianchuk	6	4	4
(Ukraine) N Kichenok	1	6	6
Q	(Ukraine) G Poznikhirenko	4	1
5	(Portugal) MJ Koehler	6	6
3	(Russia) A Kudryavtseva	6	6
Q	(Ukraine) D Bogoliy	2	2
(Ukraine) K Kozlova	6	6
(Georgia (country)) S Kvatsabaia	1	2
WC	(Ukraine) A Fedoryshyn	2	2
WC	(Ukraine) T Zakarlyuk	6	6
(Lithuania) L Stančiūtė	5	4
6	(Poland) M Domachowska	7	6

Second round
1	(Czech Republic) A Hlaváčková	6	6
(Belarus) P Pekhova	2	2
(Ukraine) N Kichenok	6	1	3
5	(Portugal) MJ Koehler	1	6	6
3	(Russia) A Kudryavtseva	6	1	6
(Ukraine) K Kozlova	4	6	3
WC	(Ukraine) T Zakarlyuk	7	1	0
6	(Poland) M Domachowska	5	6	6

Quarterfinals
1	(Czech Republic) A Hlaváčková	3	5
5	(Portugal) MJ Koehler	6	7
3	(Russia) A Kudryavtseva	6	2	5
6	(Poland) M Domachowska	2	6	7

Semifinals
5	(Portugal) MJ Koehler	6	6
6	(Poland) M Domachowska	2	1

=== Bottom half ===
First round
8	(Russia) E Ivanova	6	6
Q	(Russia) E Pushkareva	1	1
WC	(Ukraine) V Strakhova	5	6	4
(Ukraine) M Zakarlyuk	7	2	6
(Slovakia) Z Zlochová	7^{7}	6
Q	(Russia) A Koval	6^{0}	3
(Ukraine) E Ianchuk	4	0
4	(Ukraine) E Svitolina	6	6
7	(Turkey) Ç Büyükakçay	4	5
(Serbia) V Dolonc	6	7
(Luxembourg) A Kremer	0	6^{8}
(Ukraine) A Sotnikova	6	7^{10}
(Belarus) L Marozava	0	2
(Ukraine) L Kichenok	6	6
(Ukraine) V Ivakhnenko	6	6
2	(Belarus) A Yakimova	1	0

Second round
8	(Russia) E Ivanova	6	6
(Ukraine) M Zakarlyuk	3	4
(Slovakia) Z Zlochová	0	2
4	(Ukraine) E Svitolina	6	6
(Serbia) V Dolonc	6	6
(Ukraine) A Sotnikova	0	4
(Ukraine) L Kichenok	6	2	0
(Ukraine) V Ivakhnenko	3	6	6

Quarterfinals
8	(Russia) E Ivanova	0	1
4	(Ukraine) E Svitolina	6	6
(Serbia) V Dolonc	6	6
(Ukraine) V Ivakhnenko	2	2

Semifinals
4	(Ukraine) E Svitolina	1	5
(Serbia) V Dolonc	6	7
