= 2012 Viccourt Cup =

- Date: 16–22 July
- Edition: 1st
- Surface: Hard (outdoor)
- Location: Donetsk, Ukraine

Champions

Singles
- (Serbia) Vesna Dolonc

Doubles
- (Ukraine) Lyudmyla Kichenok / (Ukraine) Nadiia Kichenok
Viccourt Cup	· 2013 →

The 2012 Viccourt Cup was a professional tennis tournament played on outdoor hard courts. It was the 1st edition of the tournament and was part of the 2012 ITF Women's Circuit. It took place in Donetsk, Ukraine, between 16 and 22 July 2012.

== WTA entrants ==
=== Seeds ===
Country	Player	Rank^{1}	Seed
CZE	Andrea Hlaváčková	88	1
BLR	Anastasiya Yakimova	112	2
RUS	Alla Kudryavtseva	143	3
UKR	Elina Svitolina	175	4
POR	Maria João Koehler	183	5
POL	Marta Domachowska	189	6
TUR	Çağla Büyükakçay	199	7
RUS	Ekaterina Ivanova	206	8

- Rankings are as of 9 July 2012.

=== Other entrants ===
The following players received wildcards into the singles main draw:

- (Ukraine) Anastasiya Fedoryshyn
- (Ukraine) Oksana Koshman
- (Ukraine) Valeriya Strakhova
- (Ukraine) Taisiya Zakarlyuk

The following players received entry from the qualifying draw:

- (Ukraine) Diana Bogoliy
- (Russia) Anna Koval
- (Ukraine) Ganna Poznikhirenko
- (Russia) Ekaterina Pushkareva

== Champions ==
=== Singles ===
- (Serbia) Vesna Dolonc def. (Portugal) Maria João Koehler, 6–2, 6–3

=== Doubles ===
- (Ukraine) Lyudmyla Kichenok / (Ukraine) Nadiia Kichenok def. (Ukraine) Valentyna Ivakhnenko / (Ukraine) Kateryna Kozlova, 6–2, 7–5
