= 2011 Swedish Open – Women's singles qualifying =

Women's tennis tournament qualification

This article displays the qualifying draw of the 2011 Swedish Open.

== Players ==
=== Seeds ===
1. (Netherlands) Arantxa Rus (withdrew due to ongoing participation in Cuneo)
2. (Germany) Mona Barthel (qualified)
3. (Russia) Valeria Savinykh (second round)
4. (Romania) Alexandra Cadanţu (second round)
5. (Spain) Lara Arruabarrena-Vecino (second round)
6. (Germany) Anna-Lena Grönefeld (second round)
7. (Slovakia) Kristína Kučová (second round)
8. (Slovakia) Lenka Wienerová (second round)

=== Qualifiers ===
1. (Ukraine) Tetyana Arefyeva
2. (Germany) Mona Barthel
3. (France) Alizé Lim
4. (Australia) Olivia Rogowska

== Qualifying draw ==
=== First qualifier ===
First round
Alt	(Sweden) Madeleine Saari-Bystrom	1	2
(Italy) Anastasia Grymalska	6	6
(Latvia) Līga Dekmeijere	1	3
(Australia) Karolina Wlodarczak	6	6
WC	(Sweden) Matilda Hamlin	2	3
(Ukraine) Tetyana Arefyeva	6	6
(Australia) Isabella Holland	1	4
6	(Germany) Anna-Lena Grönefeld	6	6

Second round
(Italy) Anastasia Grymalska	6	4	4
(Australia) Karolina Wlodarczak	0	6	1^{r}
(Ukraine) Tetyana Arefyeva	6	6
6	(Germany) Anna-Lena Grönefeld	0	3

Qualifying competition
(Italy) Anastasia Grymalska	6	1	5
(Ukraine) Tetyana Arefyeva	1	6	7

=== Second qualifier ===
First round
2	(Germany) Mona Barthel	6	6
WC	(Sweden) Paulina Milosavljevic	2	2
WC	(Sweden) Brenda Njuki	1	3
(United States) Gail Brodsky	6	6
WC	(Sweden) Rebecca Poikajarvi	0	1
(Germany) Scarlett Werner	6	6
(Finland) Emma Laine	2	0
8	(Slovakia) Lenka Wienerová	6	6

Second round
2	(Germany) Mona Barthel	4	7^{12}	6
(United States) Gail Brodsky	6	6^{10}	1
(Germany) Scarlett Werner	6	6
8	(Slovakia) Lenka Wienerová	2	4

Qualifying competition
2	(Germany) Mona Barthel	6	7
(Germany) Scarlett Werner	4	5

=== Third qualifier ===
First round
3	(Russia) Valeria Savinykh	4	6	6
(Croatia) Ana Vrljić	6	2	2
(France) Alizé Lim	6	6
(Slovenia) Dalila Jakupovič	3	2
WC	(Sweden) Louise Brunskog	2	2
(Germany) Justine Ozga	6	6
(Denmark) Karen Barbat	0	0
5	(Spain) Lara Arruabarrena-Vecino	6	6

Second round
3	(Russia) Valeria Savinykh	5	3
(France) Alizé Lim	7	6
(Germany) Justine Ozga	6	6
5	(Spain) Lara Arruabarrena-Vecino	3	4

Qualifying competition
(France) Alizé Lim	6^{3}	7	6
(Germany) Justine Ozga	7^{7}	5	1

=== Fourth qualifier ===
First round
4	(Romania) Alexandra Cadanţu	6	6
WC	(Sweden) Valeria Osadchenko	2	1
(United States) Ashley Weinhold	4	2
(Russia) Elena Bovina	6	6
(Spain) Eva Fernández-Brugués	6	3	3
(Australia) Olivia Rogowska	4	6	6
WC	(Sweden) Beatrice Cedermark	1	0
7	(Slovakia) Kristína Kučová	6	6

Second round
4	(Romania) Alexandra Cadanţu	7^{7}	4	6^{4}
(Russia) Elena Bovina	6^{4}	6	7^{7}
(Australia) Olivia Rogowska	6	6
7	(Slovakia) Kristína Kučová	2	2

Qualifying competition
(Russia) Elena Bovina	6	6^{6}	2
(Australia) Olivia Rogowska	2	7^{8}	6
