= 2011 International Country Cuneo – Singles =

Singles
- 2011 International Country Cuneo

Final
- Champions: (Georgia (country)) Anna Tatishvili
- Runners-up: (Netherlands) Arantxa Rus
- Score: 6–4, 6–3

Events
Singles	Doubles
← 2010 ·	International Country Cuneo	· 2012 →

Romina Oprandi was the defending champion, but chose not to participate.
Anna Tatishvili defeating Arantxa Rus in the final 6–4, 6–3.

== Seeds ==
1. (France) Alizé Cornet (quarterfinals)
2. (France) Mathilde Johansson (first round)
3. (France) Pauline Parmentier (quarterfinals)
4. (Spain) Laura Pous Tió (second round)
5. (Croatia) Mirjana Lučić (semifinals)
6. (Russia) Vesna Dolonts (first round)
7. (Croatia) Petra Martić (quarterfinals)
8. (Belarus) Anastasiya Yakimova (second round)

== Main draw ==
=== Key ===
- Q = Qualifier
- WC = Wild card
- LL = Lucky loser
- Alt = Alternate
- SE = Special exempt
- PR = Protected ranking
- ITF = ITF entry
- JE = Junior exempt
- w/o = Walkover
- r = Retired
- d = Defaulted
- SR = Special ranking

=== Finals ===
Semifinals
(Switzerland) Stefanie Vögele	6	5	3
(Georgia (country)) Anna Tatishvili	3	7	6
(Netherlands) Arantxa Rus	4	6	6
5	(Croatia) Mirjana Lučić	6	2	4

Final
(Georgia (country)) Anna Tatishvili	6	6
(Netherlands) Arantxa Rus	4	3

=== Top half ===
First round
1	(France) A Cornet	6	3	6
(Czech Republic) S Záhlavová	1	6	3
Q	(Italy) G Gatto-Monticone	6	3	3
Q	(Spain) E Fernández-Brugués	2	6	6
(Spain) S Soler-Espinosa	6	6
(Luxembourg) M Minella	3	2
(Switzerland) S Vögele	6	6
6	(Russia) V Dolonts	3	4
3	(France) P Parmentier	6	6
(Russia) R Kulikova	4	4
(Slovakia) Z Kučová	7	6^{7}	7
Q	(Spain) L Arruabarrena-Vecino	6^{6}	7	5
WC	(Italy) K Knapp	3	6	6^{3}
(Georgia (country)) A Tatishvili	6	4	7
(Germany) K Wörle	4	5
8	(Belarus) A Yakimova	6	7

Second round
1	(France) A Cornet	6	6
Q	(Spain) E Fernández-Brugués	1	2
(Spain) S Soler-Espinosa	6	6^{7}	3
(Switzerland) S Vögele	3	7	6
3	(France) P Parmentier	6	6
(Slovakia) Z Kučová	4	1
(Georgia (country)) A Tatishvili	6	6
8	(Belarus) A Yakimova	2	2

Quarterfinals
1	(France) A Cornet	3	1
(Switzerland) S Vögele	6	6
3	(France) P Parmentier	7	2	0
(Georgia (country)) A Tatishvili	5	6	6

Semifinals
(Switzerland) S Vögele	6	5	3
(Georgia (country)) A Tatishvili	3	7	6

=== Bottom half ===
First round
7	(Croatia) P Martić	6	6
WC	(Russia) E Bovina	4	0
(Spain) C Suárez Navarro	6	4	5
(Czech Republic) E Birnerová	3	6	7
WC	(Italy) C Rosatello	0	1
(Netherlands) A Rus	6	6
(United States) J Craybas	2	4
4	(Spain) L Pous Tió	6	6
5	(Croatia) M Lučić	6	6
WC	(Italy) C Giorgi	1	1
(Italy) ME Camerin	6^{2}	6	6
Q	(Croatia) M Abramović	7	2	3
(Italy) A Floris	2	2
(Austria) Y Meusburger	6	6
(France) L Thorpe	6	6
2	(France) M Johansson	1	2

Second round
7	(Croatia) P Martić	7	4	6
(Czech Republic) E Birnerová	6^{9}	6	1
(Netherlands) A Rus	6	6
4	(Spain) L Pous Tió	1	1
5	(Croatia) M Lučić	6	6
(Italy) ME Camerin	3	2
(Austria) Y Meusburger	4	6	4
(France) L Thorpe	6	4	6

Quarterfinals
7	(Croatia) P Martić	3	5
(Netherlands) A Rus	6	7
5	(Croatia) M Lučić	6^{6}	6	6
(France) L Thorpe	7	2	4

Semifinals
(Netherlands) A Rus	4	6	6
5	(Croatia) M Lučić	6	2	4
