= 2013 Viccourt Cup – Singles =

Singles
- 2013 Viccourt Cup

Final
- Champion: (Ukraine) Elina Svitolina
- Runner-up: (Hungary) Tímea Babos
- Score: 3–6, 6–2, 7–6^{(11–9)}

Events
Singles	Doubles
← 2012 ·	Viccourt Cup	· 2014 →

Vesna Dolonc was the defending champion, having won the event in 2012, but she lost to Valentyna Ivakhnenko in the first round.

Elina Svitolina won the tournament, defeating Tímea Babos in the final, 3–6, 6–2, 7–6^{(11–9)}.

== Seeds ==
1. (Ukraine) Elina Svitolina (champion)
2. (Serbia) Vesna Dolonc (first round)
3. (Hungary) Tímea Babos (final)
4. (Germany) Dinah Pfizenmaier (semifinals)
5. (Portugal) Maria João Koehler (semifinals)
6. (Czech Republic) Kristýna Plíšková (first round)
7. (Russia) Alexandra Panova (first round)
8. (Kazakhstan) Ksenia Pervak (first round)

== Main draw ==
=== Key ===
- Q = Qualifier
- WC = Wild card
- LL = Lucky loser
- Alt = Alternate
- SE = Special exempt
- PR = Protected ranking
- ITF = ITF entry
- JE = Junior exempt
- w/o = Walkover
- r = Retired
- d = Defaulted
- SR = Special ranking

=== Finals ===
Semifinals
1	(Ukraine) Elina Svitolina	6	6
4	(Germany) Dinah Pfizenmaier	4	3
3	(Hungary) Tímea Babos	4	6	6
5	(Portugal) Maria João Koehler	6	2	4

Final
1	(Ukraine) Elina Svitolina	3	6	7^{11}
3	(Hungary) Tímea Babos	6	2	6^{9}

=== Top half ===
First round
1	(Ukraine) E Svitolina	6	6
(Belarus) I Kremen	2	4
Q	(Ukraine) A Kalinina	6	3	7
(Ukraine) V Kapshay	2	6	5
WC	(Ukraine) K Kozlova	4	6	7
(Turkey) Ç Büyükakçay	6	4	5
(Ukraine) N Kichenok	3	6	6
8	(Kazakhstan) K Pervak	6	2	0
4	(Germany) D Pfizenmaier	6	6
Q	(Kazakhstan) K Kerimbayeva	4	1
(Ukraine) Y Beygelzimer	6	6
(United States) J Cohen	3	1
(Austria) M Klaffner	6^{10}	1
Q	(Netherlands) L Kerkhove	7^{12}	6
(Russia) E Bychkova	6	6
7	(Russia) A Panova	2	3

Second round
1	(Ukraine) E Svitolina	6	6
Q	(Ukraine) A Kalinina	4	1
WC	(Ukraine) K Kozlova	4	6	7^{7}
(Ukraine) N Kichenok	6	3	6^{4}
4	(Germany) D Pfizenmaier	7^{8}	2	7
(Ukraine) Y Beygelzimer	6^{6}	6	5
Q	(Netherlands) L Kerkhove	4	3
(Russia) E Bychkova	6	6

Quarterfinals
1	(Ukraine) E Svitolina	6	6
WC	(Ukraine) K Kozlova	4	2
4	(Germany) D Pfizenmaier	2	6	7^{7}
(Russia) E Bychkova	6	3	6^{4}

Semifinals
1	(Ukraine) E Svitolina	6	6
4	(Germany) D Pfizenmaier	4	3

=== Bottom half ===
First round
6	(Czech Republic) Kr Plíšková	6	5	3
(Georgia (country)) S Shapatava	2	7	6
(Uzbekistan) N Abduraimova	4	6	0
(Serbia) A Krunić	6	1	6
(Poland) P Kania	6	6
(Belgium) A-S Mestach	4	4
WC	(Ukraine) G Poznikhirenko	3	2
3	(Hungary) T Babos	6	6
5	(Portugal) MJ Koehler	6	6
Q	(Ukraine) A Vasylyeva	3	3
(Russia) D Gavrilova	5	3
(Czech Republic) R Voráčová	7	6
(Belgium) A Van Uytvanck	6	6
WC	(Ukraine) M Zakarlyuk	0	3
WC	(Ukraine) V Ivakhnenko	6	6
2	(Serbia) V Dolonc	0	1

Second round
(Georgia (country)) S Shapatava	4	6^{7}
(Serbia) A Krunić	6	7^{9}
(Poland) P Kania	3	4
3	(Hungary) T Babos	6	6
5	(Portugal) MJ Koehler	6	7
(Czech Republic) R Voráčová	4	5
(Belgium) A Van Uytvanck	3	5
WC	(Ukraine) V Ivakhnenko	6	7

Quarterfinals
(Serbia) A Krunić	6^{2}	4
3	(Hungary) T Babos	7^{7}	6
5	(Portugal) MJ Koehler	7^{7}	7
WC	(Ukraine) V Ivakhnenko	6^{4}	5

Semifinals
3	(Hungary) T Babos	4	6	6
5	(Portugal) MJ Koehler	6	2	4
