= 2011 International Country Cuneo =

- Date: June 27 – July 3
- Edition: 13th
- Location: Cuneo, Italy

Champions

Singles
- (Georgia (country)) Anna Tatishvili

Doubles
- (Luxembourg) Mandy Minella / (Switzerland) Stefanie Vögele
← 2010 ·	International Country Cuneo	· 2012 →

The 2011 International Country Cuneo was a professional tennis tournament played on outdoor clay courts. It was part of the 2011 ITF Women's Circuit. It took place in Cuneo, Italy between June 27 and July 3, 2011.

== WTA entrants ==
=== Seeds ===
Nationality	Player	Ranking*	Seeding
FRA	Alizé Cornet	69	1
FRA	Mathilde Johansson	70	2
FRA	Pauline Parmentier	74	3
ESP	Laura Pous Tió	90	4
CRO	Mirjana Lučić	91	5
RUS	Vesna Dolonts	95	6
CRO	Petra Martić	98	7
BLR	Anastasiya Yakimova	100	8

- Rankings are as of June 20, 2011.

=== Other entrants ===
The following players received wildcards into the singles main draw:

- (Italy) Camilla Rosatello
- (Russia) Elena Bovina
- (Italy) Camila Giorgi
- (Italy) Karin Knapp

The following players received entry from the qualifying draw:

- (Croatia) Maria Abramović
- (Spain) Lara Arruabarrena-Vecino
- (Spain) Eva Fernández-Brugués
- (Italy) Giulia Gatto-Monticone

== Champions ==
=== Singles ===
(Georgia (country)) Anna Tatishvili def. (Netherlands) Arantxa Rus, 6–4, 6–3

=== Doubles ===
(Luxembourg) Mandy Minella / (Switzerland) Stefanie Vögele def. (Czech Republic) Eva Birnerová / (Russia) Vesna Dolonts, 6–3, 6–2
