= 2013 Viccourt Cup =

- Date: 29 July–3 August
- Edition: 2nd
- Draw: 32S/16D
- Prize money: $75,000
- Surface: Hard
- Location: Donetsk, Ukraine

Champions

Singles
- (Ukraine) Elina Svitolina

Doubles
- (Ukraine) Yuliya Beygelzimer / (Czech Republic) Renata Voráčová
← 2012 ·	Viccourt Cup	· 2014 →

The 2013 Viccourt Cup was a professional tennis tournament played on outdoor hard courts. It was the second edition of the tournament which was part of the 2013 ITF Women's Circuit, offering a total of $75,000 in prize money. It took place in Donetsk, Ukraine, on 29 July–3 August 2013.

== Singles entrants ==
=== Seeds ===
Country	Player	Rank^{1}	Seed
UKR	Elina Svitolina	71	1
SRB	Vesna Dolonc	93	2
HUN	Tímea Babos	106	3
GER	Dinah Pfizenmaier	107	4
POR	Maria João Koehler	124	5
CZE	Kristýna Plíšková	135	6
RUS	Alexandra Panova	141	7
KAZ	Ksenia Pervak	142	8

- ^{1} Rankings as of 22 July 2013

=== Other entrants ===
The following players received wildcards into the singles main draw:

- (Ukraine) Valentyna Ivakhnenko
- (Ukraine) Kateryna Kozlova
- (Ukraine) Ganna Poznikhirenko
- (Ukraine) Marianna Zakarlyuk

The following players received entry from the qualifying draw:

- (Ukraine) Anhelina Kalinina
- (Kazakhstan) Kamila Kerimbayeva
- (Netherlands) Lesley Kerkhove
- (Ukraine) Anastasiya Vasylyeva

== Champions ==
=== Women's singles ===
- (Ukraine) Elina Svitolina def. (Hungary) Tímea Babos 3–6, 6–2, 7–6^{(11–9)}

=== Women's doubles ===
- (Ukraine) Yuliya Beygelzimer / (Czech Republic) Renata Voráčová def. (Serbia) Vesna Dolonc / (Russia) Alexandra Panova 6–1, 6–4
