= 2012 Aegon GB Pro-Series Shrewsbury – Singles =

Singles
- 2012 Aegon GB Pro-Series Shrewsbury

Final
- Champion: (Germany) Annika Beck
- Runner-up: (Switzerland) Stefanie Vögele
- Score: 6–2, 6–4

Events
Singles	Doubles
- Aegon GB Pro-Series Shrewsbury

Mona Barthel was the defending champion, but chose not to participate.

Annika Beck won the title, defeating Stefanie Vögele in the final, 6–2, 6–4.

== Seeds ==
1. (Czech Republic) Kristýna Plíšková (first round)
2. (Czech Republic) Karolína Plíšková (second round)
3. (Switzerland) Stefanie Vögele (final)
4. (Portugal) Maria João Koehler (second round)
5. (Germany) Annika Beck (champion)
6. (Italy) Nastassja Burnett (second round)
7. (United Kingdom) Johanna Konta (second round)
8. (Russia) Marta Sirotkina (semifinal)

== Main draw ==
Key

- Q = Qualifier
- WC = Wild card
- LL = Lucky loser
- Alt = Alternate
- ITF = ITF entry
- PR = Protected ranking
- SR = Special ranking
- SE = Special exempt
- JE = Junior exempt
- JR = Junior Accelerator Programme entrant
- CO = College Accelerator Programme entrant
- NG = Next Gen Accelerator Program entrant
- w/o = Walkover
- r = Retired
- d = Defaulted

=== Finals ===
Semifinals
5	(Germany) Annika Beck	6	4	6
8	(Russia) Marta Sirotkina	2	6	0
3	(Switzerland) Stefanie Vögele	6	6
(France) Julie Coin	4	4

Final
5	(Germany) Annika Beck	6	6
3	(Switzerland) Stefanie Vögele	2	4

=== Top half ===
First round
1	(Czech Republic) Kr Plíšková	6^{5}	6	2
(France) A Rezaï	7^{7}	4	6
(Croatia) A Vrljić	6	6
WC	(United Kingdom) J Windley	0	3
(Poland) M Domachowska	6	6
(United Kingdom) L Whybourn	4	4
(United Kingdom) T Moore	2	5
5	(Germany) A Beck	6	7
4	(Portugal) MJ Koehler	6	6
WC	(United Kingdom) F Stephenson	2	2
LL	(Germany) J Kimmelmann	3	3
(Netherlands) B Schoofs	6	6
Q	(Italy) A Moratelli	3	0
Q	(France) C Seateun	6	6
(United Kingdom) S Murray	4	4
8	(Russia) M Sirotkina	6	6

Second round
(France) A Rezaï	6	6
(Croatia) A Vrljić	4	3
(Poland) M Domachowska	6	1	3
5	(Germany) A Beck	4	6	6
4	(Portugal) MJ Koehler	6	5	4
(Netherlands) B Schoofs	2	7	6
Q	(France) C Seateun	1^{r}
8	(Russia) M Sirotkina	4

Quarterfinals
(France) A Rezaï	2	6	1
5	(Germany) A Beck	6	4	6
(Netherlands) B Schoofs	6	0	4
8	(Russia) M Sirotkina	3	6	6

Semifinals
5	(Germany) A Beck	6	4	6
8	(Russia) M Sirotkina	2	6	0

=== Bottom half ===
First round
6	(Italy) N Burnett	6	6
Q	(Luxembourg) A Kremer	1	3
WC	(United Kingdom) L Brown	6^{7}	0
(Turkey) Ç Büyükakçay	7^{9}	6
(United Kingdom) N Broady	3	2
(Serbia) V Dolonc	6	6
(United Kingdom) E Webley-Smith	3	4
3	(Switzerland) S Vögele	6	6
7	(United Kingdom) J Konta	6	6
(Latvia) D Marcinkēviča	4	0
(France) J Coin	3	6	6
WC	(United Kingdom) A Fitzpatrick	6	1	3
(Italy) A Remondina	3	3
(Russia) E Bychkova	6	6
Q	(Republic of Ireland) A Bowtell	1	3
2	(Czech Republic) Ka Plíšková	6	6

Second round
6	(Italy) N Burnett	2	1
(Turkey) Ç Büyükakçay	6	6
(Serbia) V Dolonc	4	6	2
3	(Switzerland) S Vögele	6	1	6
7	(United Kingdom) J Konta	5	6	3
(France) J Coin	7	1	6
(Russia) E Bychkova	6	6
2	(Czech Republic) Ka Plíšková	3	4

Quarterfinals
(Turkey) Ç Büyükakçay	7	1	6^{7}
3	(Switzerland) S Vögele	5	6	7^{9}
(France) J Coin	7	0	7
(Russia) E Bychkova	5	6	5

Semifinals
3	(Switzerland) S Vögele	6	6
(France) J Coin	4	4
