= 2012 Aegon GB Pro-Series Shrewsbury – Doubles =

Doubles
- 2012 Aegon GB Pro-Series Shrewsbury

Final
- Champions: (Serbia) Vesna Dolonc (Switzerland) Stefanie Vögele
- Runners-up: (Czech Republic) Karolína Plíšková (Czech Republic) Kristýna Plíšková
- Score: 6–1, 6–7^{(3–7)}, [15–13]

Events
Singles	Doubles
- Aegon GB Pro-Series Shrewsbury

Maria João Koehler and Katalin Marosi were the defending champions, but Marosi chose not to participate. Koehler partnered up with Marta Sirotkina, but they lost in the semifinals to Vesna Dolonc and Stefanie Vögele.

Vesna Dolonc and Stefanie Vögele won the title, defeating Karolína Plíšková and Kristýna Plíšková in the final, 6–1, 6–7^{(3–7)}, [15–13].

== Seeds ==
1. (Czech Republic) Karolína Plíšková / (Czech Republic) Kristýna Plíšková (final)
2. (Serbia) Vesna Dolonc / (Switzerland) Stefanie Vögele (champions)
3. (Portugal) Maria João Koehler / (Russia) Marta Sirotkina (semifinals)
4. (France) Julie Coin / (Croatia) Ana Vrljić (semifinals)

== Draw ==
Key

- Q = Qualifier
- WC = Wild card
- LL = Lucky loser
- Alt = Alternate
- ITF = ITF entry
- PR = Protected ranking
- SR = Special ranking
- SE = Special exempt
- JE = Junior exempt
- JR = Junior Accelerator Programme entrant
- CO = College Accelerator Programme entrant
- NG = Next Gen Accelerator Program entrant
- w/o = Walkover
- r = Retired
- d = Defaulted

=== Draw ===
First round
1	(Czech Republic) Ka Plíšková (Czech Republic) Kr Plíšková	6	6
(Slovenia) A Prislan (Poland) S Zagórska	3	4
WC	(Russia) E Bychkova (United Kingdom) L Deigman	3	1
(United Kingdom) A Elliott (United Kingdom) J Konta	6	6
4	(France) J Coin (Croatia) A Vrljić	6	6
(Turkey) Ç Büyükakçay (Latvia) D Marcinkēviča	2	4
WC	(Republic of Ireland) A Bowtell (United Kingdom) L Brown	6	1	[11]
WC	(United Kingdom) F Stephenson (United Kingdom) L Whybourn	4	6	[9]
(United Kingdom) S Murray (United Kingdom) E Webley-Smith	4	6	[10]
(Germany) J Kimmelmann (Germany) A Wessel	6	2	[5]
(United Kingdom) N Broady (United Kingdom) T Moore	6	5	[5]
3	(Portugal) MJ Koehler (Russia) M Sirotkina	3	7	[10]
(Poland) M Domachowska (Austria) S Klemenschits	6	6
(United Kingdom) A Fitzpatrick (United Kingdom) J Windley	4	2
(Italy) N Burnett (Italy) A Remondina	3	2
2	(Serbia) V Dolonc (Switzerland) S Vögele	6	6

Quarterfinals
1	(Czech Republic) Ka Plíšková (Czech Republic) Kr Plíšková	6	7^{7}
(United Kingdom) A Elliott (United Kingdom) J Konta	2	6^{2}
4	(France) J Coin (Croatia) A Vrljić	6	2	[10]
WC	(Republic of Ireland) A Bowtell (United Kingdom) L Brown	1	6	[6]
(United Kingdom) S Murray (United Kingdom) E Webley-Smith	3	6^{5}
3	(Portugal) MJ Koehler (Russia) M Sirotkina	6	7^{7}
(Poland) M Domachowska (Austria) S Klemenschits	4	1
2	(Serbia) V Dolonc (Switzerland) S Vögele	6	6

Semifinals
1	(Czech Republic) Ka Plíšková (Czech Republic) Kr Plíšková	6	7^{7}
4	(France) J Coin (Croatia) A Vrljić	2	6^{4}
3	(Portugal) MJ Koehler (Russia) M Sirotkina	4	1
2	(Serbia) V Dolonc (Switzerland) S Vögele	6	6

Finals
1	(Czech Republic) Ka Plíšková (Czech Republic) Kr Plíšková	1	7^{7}	[13]
2	(Serbia) V Dolonc (Switzerland) S Vögele	6	6^{3}	[15]
