= 2011 Dubai Tennis Championships – Women's singles qualifying =

This article displays the qualifying draw of the 2011 Dubai Tennis Championships.

== Players ==
=== Seeds ===
1. (Russia) Anastasia Pavlyuchenkova (qualified)
2. (China) Peng Shuai (qualified)
3. (Japan) Ayumi Morita (qualified)
4. (Romania) Monica Niculescu (qualifying competition)
5. (Germany) Kristina Barrois (qualified)
6. (South Africa) Chanelle Scheepers (qualified)
7. (Belgium) Kirsten Flipkens (first round)
8. (Austria) Tamira Paszek (qualifying competition)
9. (China) Zhang Shuai (qualified)
10. (Italy) Alberta Brianti (qualifying competition)
11. (Ukraine) Kateryna Bondarenko (qualifying competition)
12. (Russia) Vesna Manasieva (qualifying competition)
13. (Italy) Maria Elena Camerin (qualifying competition)
14. (Slovakia) Zuzana Kučová (qualified)
15. (Spain) Nuria Llagostera Vives (qualified)
16. (Japan) Kurumi Nara (first round)

=== Qualifiers ===
1. (Russia) Anastasia Pavlyuchenkova
2. (China) Peng Shuai
3. (Japan) Ayumi Morita
4. (Slovakia) Zuzana Kučová
5. (Germany) Kristina Barrois
6. (South Africa) Chanelle Scheepers
7. (China) Zhang Shuai
8. (Spain) Nuria Llagostera Vives

== Qualifying draw ==
=== First qualifier ===
First round
1 | (Russia) Anastasia Pavlyuchenkova | 6 | 6
(Russia) Vitalia Diatchenko | 4 | 3
WC | (Russia) Maria Kondratieva | 6 | 1 | 2
13 | (Italy) Maria Elena Camerin | 4 | 6 | 6

Qualifying competition
1 | (Russia) Anastasia Pavlyuchenkova | 4 | 7 | 6
13 | (Italy) Maria Elena Camerin | 6 | 5 | 2

=== Second qualifier ===
First round
2 | (China) Peng Shuai | 6 | 6
WC | (Germany) Vanessa Henke | 1 | 0
(Portugal) Magali de Lattre | 1 | 0
11 | (Ukraine) Kateryna Bondarenko | 6 | 6

Qualifying competition
2 | (China) Peng Shuai | 5 | 6 | 6
11 | (Ukraine) Kateryna Bondarenko | 7 | 4 | 2

=== Third qualifier ===
First round
3 | (Japan) Ayumi Morita | 6 | 6
WC | (France) Sophie Lefèvre | 2 | 4
(Croatia) Ana Vrljić | 2 | 4
12 | (Russia) Vesna Manasieva | 6 | 6

Qualifying competition
3 | (Japan) Ayumi Morita | 7 | 6
12 | (Russia) Vesna Manasieva | 5 | 1

=== Fourth qualifier ===
First round
4 | (Romania) Monica Niculescu | 6 | 6
PR | (Ukraine) Viktoriya Kutuzova | 2 | 3
(United States) Abigail Spears | 3 | 7 | 1
14 | (Slovakia) Zuzana Kučová | 6 | 6^{4} | 6

Qualifying competition
4 | (Romania) Monica Niculescu | 5 | 5
14 | (Slovakia) Zuzana Kučová | 7 | 7

=== Fifth qualifier ===
First round
5 | (Germany) Kristina Barrois | 6 | 6
WC | (Czech Republic) Vladimíra Uhlířová | 1 | 0
(Germany) Tatjana Malek | 7 | 2 | 6
16 | (Japan) Kurumi Nara | 6^{5} | 6 | 3

Qualifying competition
5 | (Germany) Kristina Barrois | 2 | 6 | 7
(Germany) Tatjana Malek | 6 | 3 | 5

=== Sixth qualifier ===
First round
6 | (South Africa) Chanelle Scheepers | 6 | 3
(Belarus) Darya Kustova | 1 | 0^{r}
WC | (Oman) Fatma Al Nabhani | 4 | 3
10 | (Italy) Alberta Brianti | 6 | 6

Qualifying competition
6 | (South Africa) Chanelle Scheepers | 6 | 6
10 | (Italy) Alberta Brianti | 2 | 2

=== Seventh qualifier ===
First round
7 | (Belgium) Kirsten Flipkens | 6^{5} | 2
(Poland) Urszula Radwańska | 7 | 6
WC | (Belarus) Tatiana Poutchek | 5 | 0
9 | (China) Zhang Shuai | 7 | 6

Qualifying competition
(Poland) Urszula Radwańska | 2 | 2
9 | (China) Zhang Shuai | 6 | 6

=== Eighth qualifier ===
First round
8 | (Austria) Tamira Paszek | 6 | 6
WC | (South Africa) Natalie Grandin | 3 | 4
(Romania) Liana Ungur | 6 | 2 | 2
15 | (Spain) Nuria Llagostera Vives | 4 | 6 | 6

Qualifying competition
8 | (Austria) Tamira Paszek | 7 | 3 | 1
15 | (Spain) Nuria Llagostera Vives | 6^{2} | 6 | 6
