= International Country Cuneo =

ITF Women's Tour
- Event name: International Country Cuneo
- Location: Cuneo, Italy
- Venue: Country Club Cuneo
- Category: ITF Women's Circuit
- Surface: Clay
- Draw: 32S/32Q/16D
- Prize money: $15,000
- Website: internationalcountryclub.com

The International Country Cuneo was a tournament for professional female tennis players played on outdoor clay courts. The event was classified as a $15,000 ITF Women's Circuit tournament. It was held annually in Cuneo, Italy from 1999 to 2018. The tournament, previously a $100,000 event, was not held from 2012 to 2016, and was revived in 2017 as a $15,000 tournament.

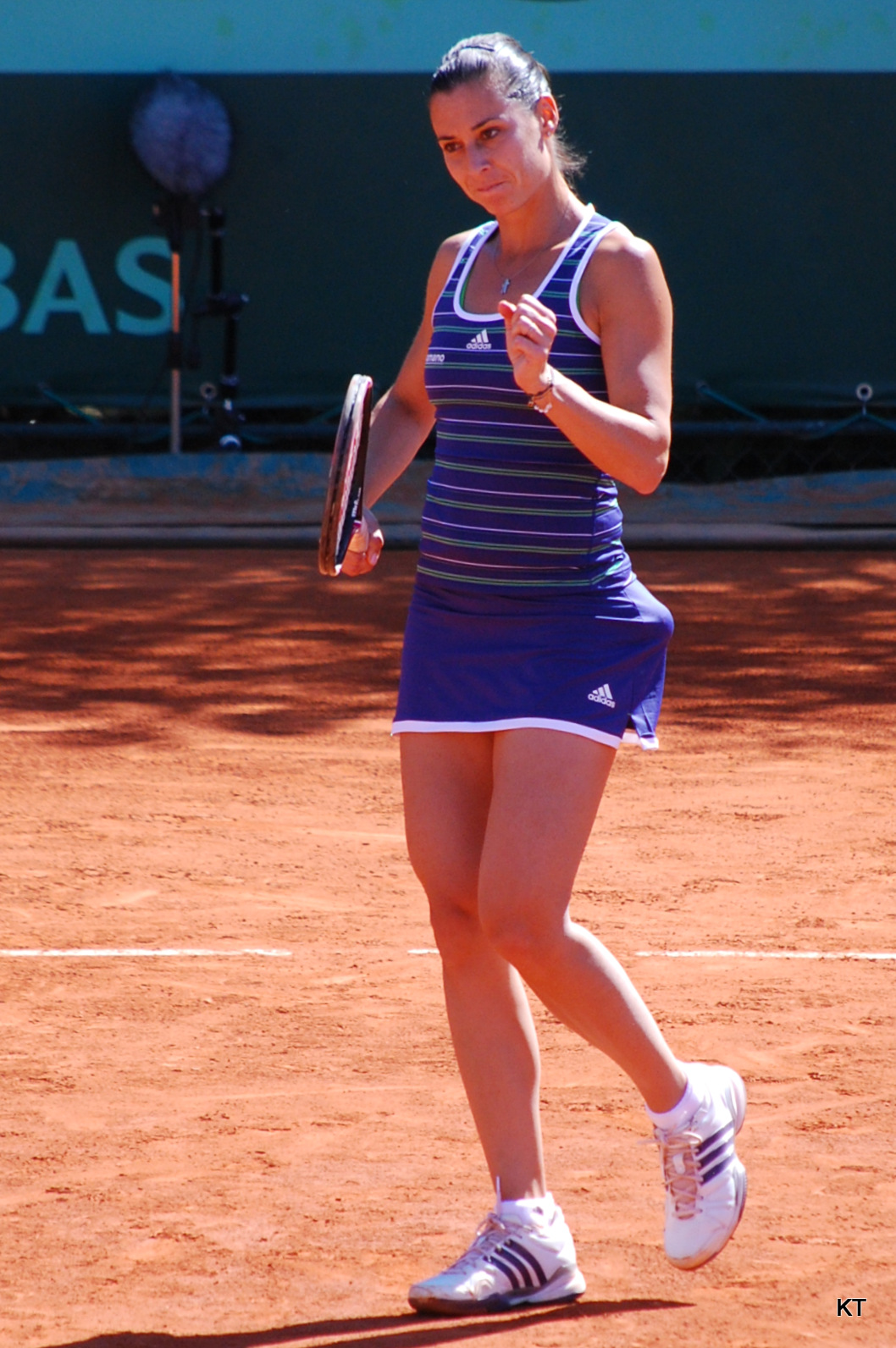
2015 US Open winner Flavia Pennetta won the 2004 edition

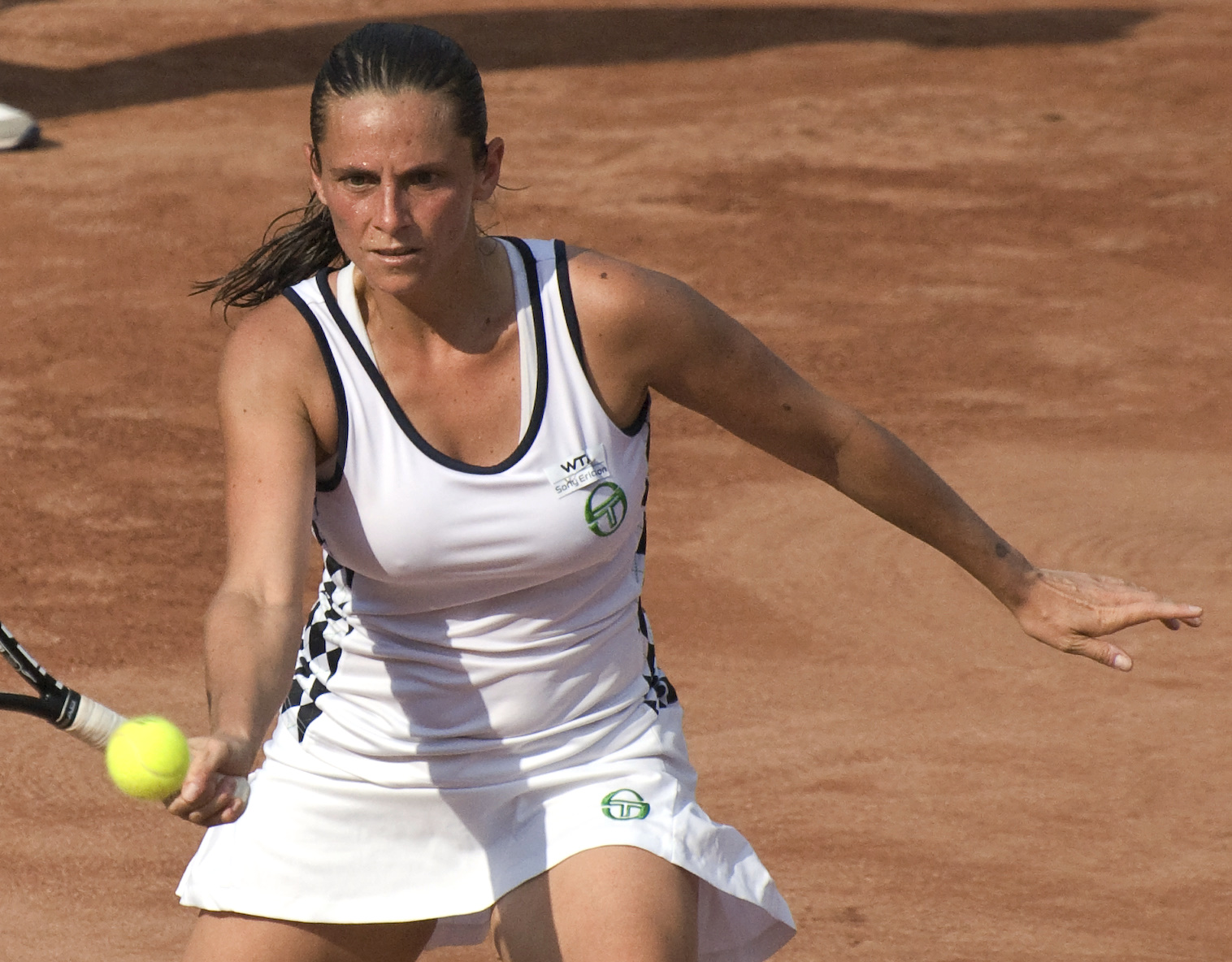
2015 US Open runner-up Roberta Vinci won the tournament's first edition in 1999

== Past finals ==
=== Singles ===
| Year | Champion | Runner-up | Score |
|---|---|---|---|
| 2018 | (Brazil) Paula Cristina Gonçalves | (Italy) Bianca Turati | 6–4, 6–2 |
| 2017 | (Italy) Martina Colmegna | (Italy) Federica Di Sarra | 6–7^{(2–7)}, 6–3, 6–3 |
| 2016–12 | Not held | | |
| 2011 | (Georgia (country)) Anna Tatishvili | (Netherlands) Arantxa Rus | 6–4, 6–3 |
| 2010 | (Italy) Romina Oprandi | (France) Pauline Parmentier | 6–0, 6–2 |
| 2009 | (Slovenia) Polona Hercog | (United States) Varvara Lepchenko | 6–1, 6–2 |
| 2008 | (Italy) Tathiana Garbin | (Romania) Sorana Cîrstea | 6–3, 6–1 |
| 2007 | (Argentina) María Emilia Salerni | (Italy) Sara Errani | 3–6, 6–1, 7–6^{(8–6)} |
| 2006 | (Russia) Galina Voskoboeva | (Italy) Alice Canepa | 6–1, 6–2 |
| 2005 | (Spain) Laura Pous Tió | (Spain) Conchita Martínez Granados | 6–3, 6–2 |
| 2004 | (Italy) Flavia Pennetta | (Italy) Alice Canepa | 6–4, 6–1 |
| 2003 | (Italy) Tathiana Garbin | (Bulgaria) Lubomira Bacheva | 6–3, 6–1 |
| 2002 | (Israel) Yevgenia Savransky | (Italy) Vittoria Maglio | 6–1, 6–3 |
| 2001 | (Italy) Jasmine Angeli | (Germany) Julia Schruff | 6–3, 7–6^{(9–7)} |
| 2000 | (Italy) Mara Santangelo | (France) Edith Nunes-Bersot | 6–2, 3–6, 6–3 |
| 1999 | (Italy) Roberta Vinci | (Austria) Stefanie Haidner | 6–1, 6–2 |

=== Doubles ===
| Year | Champions | Runners-up | Score |
|---|---|---|---|
| 2018 | (Italy) Isabella Tcherkes Zade (Italy) Aurora Zantedeschi | (Italy) Jessica Bertoldo (Italy) Carlotta Ripa | 6–3, 6–1 |
| 2017 | (Italy) Federica Di Sarra (Italy) Anastasia Grymalska | (Argentina) Melina Ferrero (Argentina) Sofía Luini | 6–0, 6–1 |
| 2016–12 | Not held | | |
| 2011 | (Luxembourg) Mandy Minella (Switzerland) Stefanie Vögele | (Czech Republic) Eva Birnerová (Russia) Vesna Dolonts | 6–3, 6–2 |
| 2010 | (Czech Republic) Eva Birnerová (Czech Republic) Lucie Hradecká | (Romania) Sorana Cîrstea (Slovenia) Andreja Klepač | 3–6, 6–4, [10–8] |
| 2009 | (Uzbekistan) Akgul Amanmuradova (Belarus) Darya Kustova | (Czech Republic) Petra Cetkovská (France) Mathilde Johansson | 5–7, 6–1, [10–7] |
| 2008 | (Estonia) Maret Ani (Czech Republic) Renata Voráčová | (Ukraine) Olga Savchuk (Russia) Marina Shamayko | 6–1, 6–2 |
| 2007 | (Belarus) Darya Kustova (Russia) Ekaterina Makarova | (Ukraine) Yuliya Beygelzimer (Georgia (country)) Margalita Chakhnashvili | 6–2, 2–6, 6–2 |
| 2006 | (Italy) Sara Errani (Italy) Karin Knapp | (Italy) Giulia Gatto-Monticone (Belarus) Darya Kustova | 6–3, 7–6^{(7–5)} |
| 2005 | (Ukraine) Mariya Koryttseva (Russia) Galina Voskoboeva | (Italy) Sara Errani (Italy) Giulia Gabba | 6–3, 7–5 |
| 2004 | (Romania) Edina Gallovits (Hungary) Zsófia Gubacsi | (Czech Republic) Eva Hrdinová (Czech Republic) Sandra Záhlavová | 7–5, 6–3 |
| 2003 | (Bosnia and Herzegovina) Mervana Jugić-Salkić (Croatia) Darija Jurak | (Bulgaria) Lubomira Bacheva (Austria) Stefanie Haidner | 6–1, 6–2 |
| 2002 | (France) Karla Mraz (France) Aurélie Védy | (Italy) Stefania Chieppa (Israel) Yevgenia Savransky | 2–6, 6–3, 6–2 |
| 2001 | (Slovakia) Andrea Masaryková (Germany) Julia Schruff | (Italy) Jasmine Angeli (Italy) Monica Scartoni | 6–2, 7–6^{(7–4)} |
| 2000 | (Italy) Maria Elena Camerin (Italy) Mara Santangelo | (Italy) Silvia Disderi (Italy) Anna Floris | 7–5, 6–2 |
| 1999 | (Italy) Sabina Da Ponte (Italy) Roberta Vinci | (Italy) Cristina Coletto (Italy) Emanuela Falleti | 6–2, 6–0 |
