= 2012 Aegon GB Pro-Series Shrewsbury =

- Date: 17–23 September
- Edition: 5th
- Surface: Hard (indoor)
- Location: Shrewsbury, United Kingdom

Champions

Singles
- (Germany) Annika Beck

Doubles
- (Serbia) Vesna Dolonc / (Switzerland) Stefanie Vögele
- Aegon GB Pro-Series Shrewsbury

The 2012 Aegon GB Pro-Series Shrewsbury was a professional tennis tournament played on indoor hard courts. It was the fifth edition of the tournament which was part of the 2012 ITF Women's Circuit. It took place in Shrewsbury, United Kingdom, on 17–23 September 2012.

== WTA entrants ==
=== Seeds ===
Country	Player	Rank^{1}	Seed
CZE	Kristýna Plíšková	106	1
CZE	Karolína Plíšková	111	2
SUI	Stefanie Vögele	131	3
POR	Maria João Koehler	136	4
GER	Annika Beck	141	5
ITA	Nastassja Burnett	143	6
GBR	Johanna Konta	148	7
RUS	Marta Sirotkina	160	8

- ^{1} Rankings are as of 10 September 2012.

=== Other entrants ===
The following players received wildcards into the singles main draw:

- (United Kingdom) Lucy Brown
- (United Kingdom) Anna Fitzpatrick
- (United Kingdom) Francesca Stephenson
- (United Kingdom) Jade Windley

The following players received entry from the qualifying draw:

- (Republic of Ireland) Amy Bowtell
- (Luxembourg) Anne Kremer
- (Italy) Angelica Moratelli
- (France) Charlène Seateun

The following player received entry by a lucky loser spot:

- (Germany) Julia Kimmelmann

== Champions ==
=== Singles ===
- (Germany) Annika Beck def. (Switzerland) Stefanie Vögele, 6–2, 6–4

=== Doubles ===
- (Serbia) Vesna Dolonc / (Switzerland) Stefanie Vögele def. (Czech Republic) Karolína Plíšková / (Czech Republic) Kristýna Plíšková, 6–1, 6–7^{(3–7)}, [15–13]
