= Viccourt Cup =

ITF Women's Circuit tennis tournament

ITF Women's Tour
- Event name: Viccourt Cup
- Location: Donetsk, Ukraine
- Venue: Tennis Club "VicCourt"
- Category: ITF Women's Circuit
- Surface: Hard
- Draw: 32S/32Q/16D
- Prize money: $75,000
- Website: www.tennis.donetsk.ua

The Viccourt Cup was a tournament for professional female tennis players played on outdoor hard courts in Donetsk, Ukraine. The event was classified as a $75,000 ITF Women's Circuit tournament which first took place in 2012. The event was cancelled in 2014 due to the pro-Russian unrest in Ukraine.

== Past finals ==
=== Singles ===
Year	Champion	Runner-up	Score
2013	(Ukraine) Elina Svitolina	(Hungary) Tímea Babos	3–6, 6–2, 7–6^{(11–9)}
2012	(Serbia) Vesna Dolonc	(Portugal) Maria João Koehler	6–2, 6–3

=== Doubles ===
Year	Champions	Runners-up	Score
2013	(Ukraine) Yuliya Beygelzimer (Czech Republic) Renata Voráčová	(Serbia) Vesna Dolonc (Russia) Alexandra Panova	6–1, 6–4
2012	(Ukraine) Lyudmyla Kichenok (Ukraine) Nadiya Kichenok	(Ukraine) Valentyna Ivakhnenko (Ukraine) Kateryna Kozlova	6–2, 7–5
