= Anna Tatishvili =

Georgian-American tennis player (born 1990)

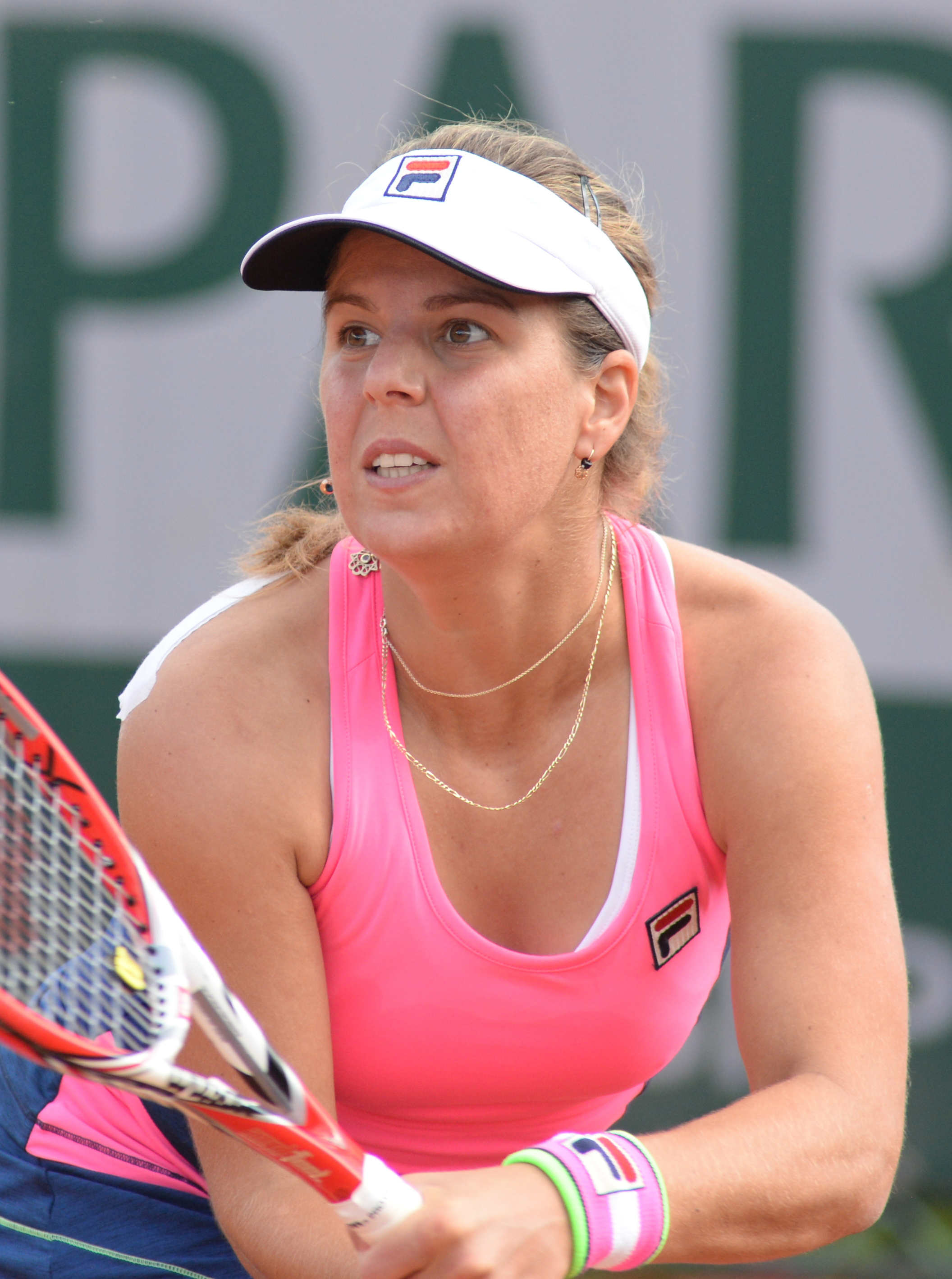
- Tatishvili at the 2015 French Open
- Country (sports): Georgia (2005–2014); United States (2014–2020)
- Born: February 3, 1990 (age 36) Tbilisi, Georgian SSR, Soviet Union
- Height: 1.71 m (5 ft 7 in)
- Turned pro: 2005
- Retired: 2020
- Plays: Right (two-handed backhand)
- Prize money: US$ 1,609,016

Singles
- Career record: 355–277
- Career titles: 11 ITF
- Highest ranking: No. 50 (October 8, 2012)

Grand Slam singles results
- Australian Open: 2R (2012, 2015)
- French Open: 1R (2011, 2012, 2013, 2014, 2019)
- Wimbledon: 2R (2011, 2012)
- US Open: 4R (2012)

Other tournaments
- Olympic Games: 2R (2012)

Doubles
- Career record: 158–134
- Career titles: 1 WTA, 8 ITF
- Highest ranking: No. 59 (May 21, 2012)

Grand Slam doubles results
- Australian Open: 1R (2012, 2015)
- French Open: 2R (2013)
- Wimbledon: 1R (2012)
- US Open: 3R (2011)

Other doubles tournaments
- Olympic Games: 1R (2012)

Team competitions
- Fed Cup: 10–3

Anna Tatishvili (Georgian: ანა ტატიშვილი, romanized: ana t'at'ishvili, pronounced [ana tʼatʼiʃʷili]; born February 3, 1990) is a Georgian-American former professional tennis player. On 8 October 2012, she reached her career-high singles ranking of world No. 50. On 21 May 2012, she peaked at No. 59 in the doubles rankings.

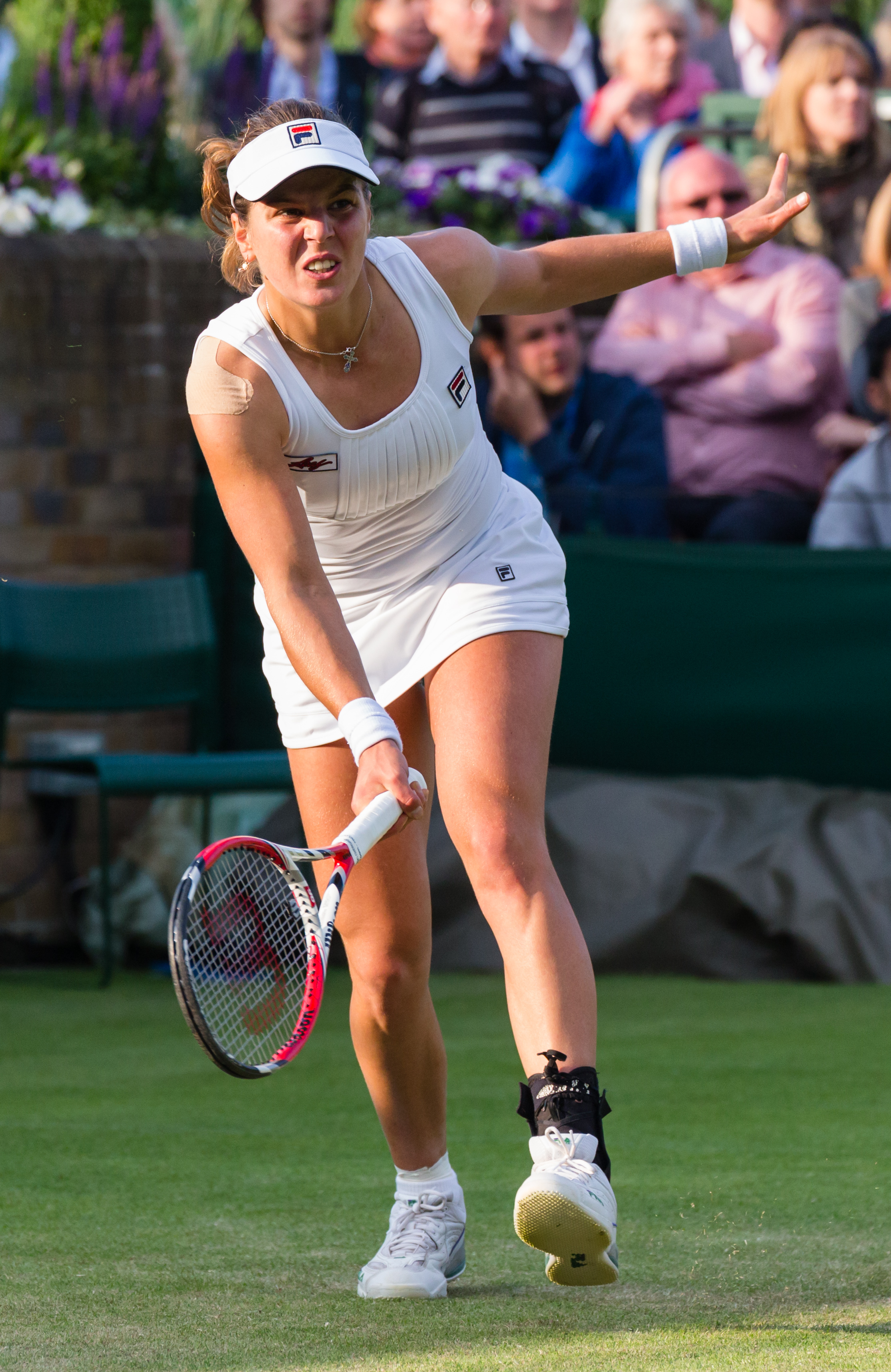
At the 2013 Wimbledon Championships

Tatishvili won one doubles title on the WTA Tour at the 2014 Linz Open, partnering with Raluca Olaru. She also won eleven singles and eight doubles titles on the ITF Women's Circuit.

Competing for Georgia Fed Cup team, Tatishvili has a win–loss record of 10–3.

== Career ==
Her biggest achievement was a fourth-round appearance at the 2012 US Open, in which she was defeated by then-world No. 1 Victoria Azarenka, in straight sets.

At the 2015 US Open, Tatishvili soared through the qualifiers to face the world No. 8, Karolína Plíšková, in the first round of the main draw. Using her aggressive returns and dominant ground strokes, Tatishvili defeated the eighth seed in just 51 minutes.

She announced her retirement from tennis on 26 March 2020, citing recurring injuries.

== Personal life ==
Tatishvili started playing tennis at the age of four and plays right-handed. She was coached by Ean Meyer. Tatishvili was granted American citizenship in 2014; she began competing for the United States at the 2014 Internationaux de Strasbourg.

Anna has an older sister, Tamta.

== Grand Slam performance timelines ==
Key
W	F	SF	QF	#R	RR	Q#	DNQ	A	NH

(W) winner; (F) finalist; (SF) semifinalist; (QF) quarterfinalist; (#R) rounds 4, 3, 2, 1; (RR) round-robin stage; (Q#) qualification round; (DNQ) did not qualify; (A) absent; (NH) not held; (SR) strike rate (events won / competed); (W–L) win–loss record.
To avoid confusion and double counting, these charts are updated at the conclusion of a tournament or when the player's participation has ended.

=== Singles ===
Tournament	2008	2009	2010	2011	2012	2013	2014	2015	2016	2017	W–L
Australian Open	A	Q1	Q1	Q2	2R	1R	1R	2R	1R	1R	2–6
French Open	A	Q2	Q2	1R	1R	1R	1R	Q2	Q1	A	0–4
Wimbledon	A	Q1	Q1	2R	2R	1R	1R	Q3	1R	A	2–5
US Open	Q1	Q3	Q3	1R	4R	1R	Q1	2R	A	A	4–4
Win–loss	0–0	0–0	0–0	1–3	5–4	0–4	0–3	2–2	0–2	0–1	8–19

=== Doubles ===
Tournament	2010	2011	2012	2013	2014	W–L
Australian Open	A	A	1R	1R	A	0–2
French Open	A	A	1R	2R	A	1–2
Wimbledon	A	Q1	1R	1R	A	0–2
US Open	A	3R	1R	A	A	2–2
Win–loss	0–0	2–1	0–4	1–3	0–0	3–8

== WTA Tour finals ==
=== Doubles: 3 (1 title, 2 runner-ups) ===
Legend
Premier
International (1–2)

Result	W–L	Date	Tournament	Surface	Partner	Opponents	Score
Loss	0–1	Sep 2011	Tournoi de Québec, Canada	Hard	(United States) Jamie Hampton	(United States) Raquel Kops-Jones (United States) Abigail Spears	0–6, 6–3, [6–10]
Loss	0–2	Jul 2013	Budapest Grand Prix, Hungary	Clay	(Russia) Nina Bratchikova	(Czech Republic) Andrea Hlaváčková (Czech Republic) Lucie Hradecká	4–6, 1–6
Win	1–2	Oct 2014	Linz Open, Austria	Hard (i)	(Romania) Raluca Olaru	(Germany) Annika Beck (France) Caroline Garcia	6–2, 6–1

== ITF Circuit finals ==
=== Singles: 17 (11 titles, 6 runner-ups) ===
Legend
$100,000 tournaments (1–1)
$75,000 tournaments (1–2)
$50,000 tournaments (3–1)
$25,000 tournaments (6–2)

Result	W–L	Date	Tournament	Tier	Surface	Opponent	Score
Win	1–0	Jun 2008	ITF El Paso, United States	25,000	Hard	(United States) Lauren Albanese	6–4, 6–3
Win	2–0	Jun 2008	ITF Boston, United States	50,000	Hard	(Chinese Taipei) Chan Chin-wei	2–6, 6–1, 6–3
Win	3–0	Sep 2008	ITF Troy, United States	50,000	Hard	(United Kingdom) Georgie Gent	7–6^{(7–4)}, 6–4
Win	4–0	Jun 2009	ITF Kristinehamn, Sweden	25,000	Clay	(Hungary) Réka Luca Jani	6–1, 7–5
Win	5–0	May 2010	Grado Tennis Cup, Italy	25,000	Clay	(Serbia) Ana Jovanović	6–7^{(3–7)}, 6–3, 6–4
Win	6–0	Jul 2011	International Country Cuneo, Italy	100,000	Clay	(Netherlands) Arantxa Rus	6–4, 6–3
Loss	6–1	Sep 2011	Albuquerque Championships, United States	75,000	Hard	(Russia) Regina Kulikova	5–7, 3–6
Loss	6–2	Jul 2012	Internazionale di Biella, Italy	100,000	Clay	(Sweden) Johanna Larsson	3–6, 4–6
Loss	6–3	Sep 2013	Albuquerque Championships	75,000	Hard	(United States) Shelby Rogers	2–6, 3–6
Win	7–3	Oct 2013	Tennis Classic of Macon, US	25,000	Hard	(Croatia) Ajla Tomljanović	6–2, 1–6, 7–5
Loss	7–4	Oct 2013	ITF Rock Hill, US	25,000	Hard	(Colombia) Mariana Duque Mariño	3–6, 4–6
Win	8–4	Oct 2013	ITF Florence, US	25,000	Hard	(United States) Madison Brengle	6–2, 4–6, 6–4
Win	9–4	Nov 2013	ITF New Braunfels, US	50,000	Hard	(Bulgaria) Elitsa Kostova	6–4, 6–4
Win	10–4	Jan 2014	ITF Daytona Beach, US	25,000	Clay	(United States) Allie Kiick	6–1, 6–3
Win	11–4	Sep 2014	Albuquerque Championships	75,000	Hard	(United States) Irina Falconi	6–2, 6–4
Loss	11–5	Nov 2015	Tennis Classic of Macon, US	50,000	Hard	(Sweden) Rebecca Peterson	3–6, 6–4, 1–6
Loss	11–6	Jan 2016	ITF Sunrise, US	25,000	Clay	(Tunisia) Ons Jabeur	6–3, 2–6, 1–6

=== Doubles: 17 (8 titles, 9 runner-ups) ===
Legend
$100,000 tournaments (2–3)
$75,000 tournaments (0–1)
$50,000 tournaments (4–4)
$25,000 tournaments (2–1)

Result	W–L	Date	Tournament	Tier	Surface	Partner	Opponents	Score
Loss	0–1	Apr 2008	Charlottesville Open, US	50,000	Clay	(United States) Kimberly Couts	(United States) Raquel Kops-Jones (United States) Abigail Spears	1–6, 3–6
Win	1–1	May 2008	ITF Raleigh, US	25,000	Clay	(United States) Kimberly Couts	(Switzerland) Stefania Boffa (Austria) Nicole Rottmann	6–3, 6–4
Loss	1–2	May 2008	ITF Carson, US	50,000	Clay	(United States) Kimberly Couts	(Indonesia) Romana Tedjakusuma (United States) Story Tweedie-Yates	6–7^{(10–12)}, 6–4, [7–10]
Loss	1–3	Apr 2009	Open de Cagnes-sur-Mer, France	100,000	Clay	(Argentina) Erica Krauth	(France) Julie Coin (Canada) Marie-Ève Pelletier	4–6, 3–6
Loss	1–4	May 2009	Grado Tennis Cup, Italy	25,000	Clay	(Argentina) Jorgelina Cravero	(Hungary) Anikó Kapros (Austria) Sandra Klemenschits	3–6, 0–6
Win	2–4	Oct 2009	ITF Kansas City, US	50,000	Hard	(United States) Lilia Osterloh	(United States) Julia Boserup (United States) Laura Granville	6–0, 6–3
Win	3–4	Nov 2009	ITF Rock Hill, US	25,000	Hard	(Canada) Sharon Fichman	(United States) Lauren Albanese (United States) Jamie Hampton	7–6^{(7–5)}, 4–6, [10–3]
Loss	3–5	Nov 2009	ITF Phoenix, US	50,000	Hard	(Canada) Marie-Ève Pelletier	(Canada) Sharon Fichman (United States) Mashona Washington	6–4, 4–6, [8–10]
Loss	3–6	Feb 2010	Midland Tennis Classic, US	100,000	Hard (i)	(United States) Lilia Osterloh	(United States) Laura Granville (Czech Republic) Lucie Hradecká	6–7^{(3–7)}, 6–3, [10–12]
Win	4–6	Feb 2011	Midland Tennis Classic, US	100,000	Hard (i)	(United States) Jamie Hampton	(United States) Irina Falconi (United States) Alison Riske	w/o
Win	5–6	Jul 2013	Reinert Open, Germany	50,000	Clay	(Georgia (country)) Sofia Shapatava	(France) Claire Feuerstein (Czech Republic) Renata Voráčová	6–4, 6–4
Win	6–6	Nov 2013	ITF New Braunfels, US	50,000	Hard	(United States) CoCo Vandeweghe	(United States) Asia Muhammad (United States) Taylor Townsend	3–6, 6–3, [13–11]
Win	7–6	Feb 2014	Midland Tennis Classic, US	100,000	Hard (i)	(United Kingdom) Heather Watson	(Canada) Sharon Fichman (United States) Maria Sanchez	7–5, 5–7, [10–6]
Loss	7–7	Oct 2014	Tennis Classic of Macon, US	50,000	Hard	(United States) Ashley Weinhold	(United States) Madison Brengle (United States) Alexa Glatch	0–6, 5–7
Win	8–7	Nov 2014	ITF Captiva Island, US	50,000	Hard	(Canada) Gabriela Dabrowski	(United States) Asia Muhammad (United States) Maria Sanchez	6–3, 6–3
Loss	8–8	Aug 2015	Vancouver Open, Canada	100,000	Hard	(Romania) Raluca Olaru	(United Kingdom) Johanna Konta (United States) Maria Sanchez	6–7^{(5–7)}, 4–6
Loss	8–9	Sep 2015	Albuquerque Championships, US	75,000	Hard	(Austria) Tamira Paszek	(Brazil) Paula Cristina Gonçalves (United States) Sanaz Marand	6–4, 2–6, [3–10]

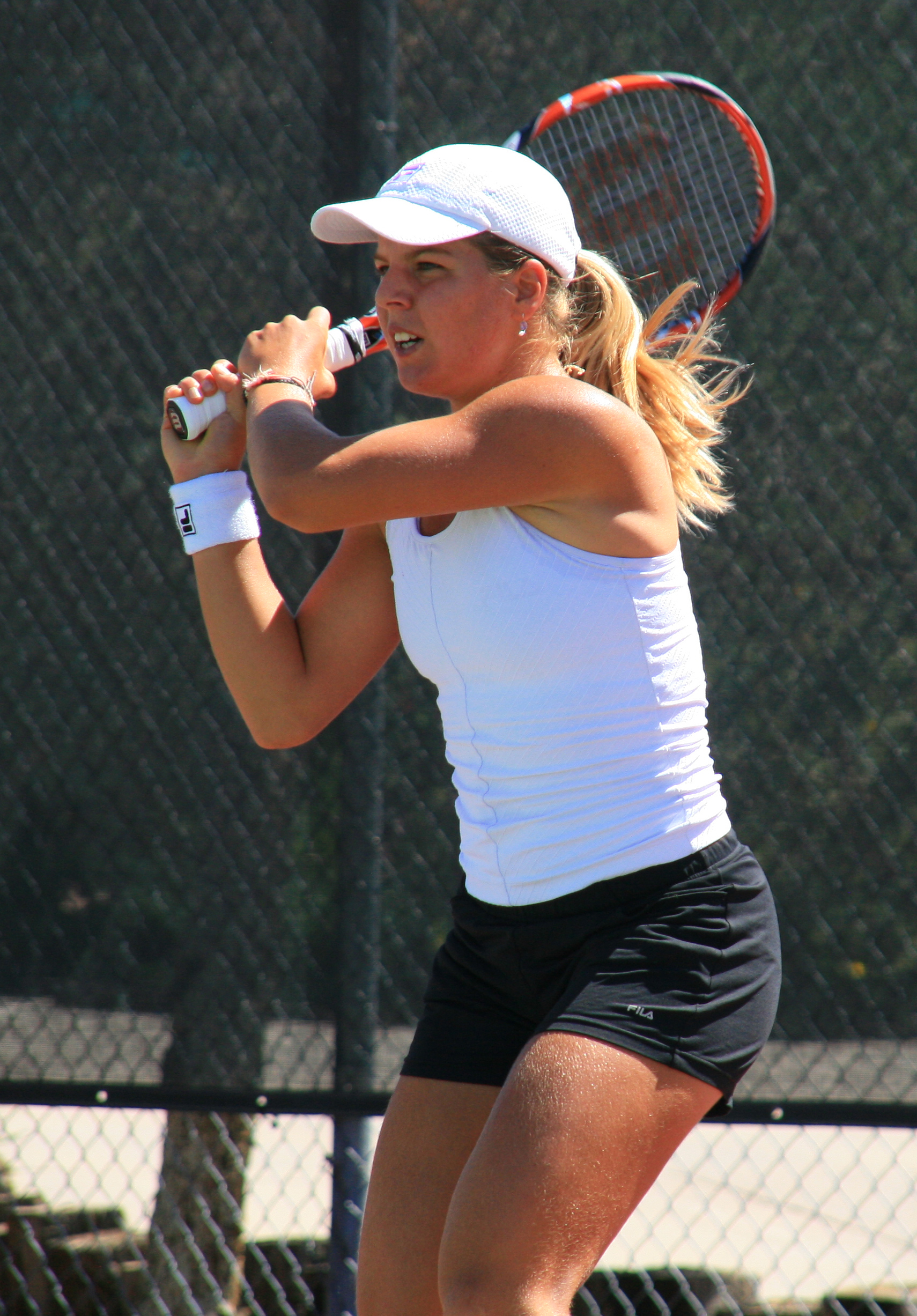
Tatishvili at Albuquerque, 2008
