= Polina Pekhova =

Belarusian tennis player

Polina Pekhova Паліна Пехава
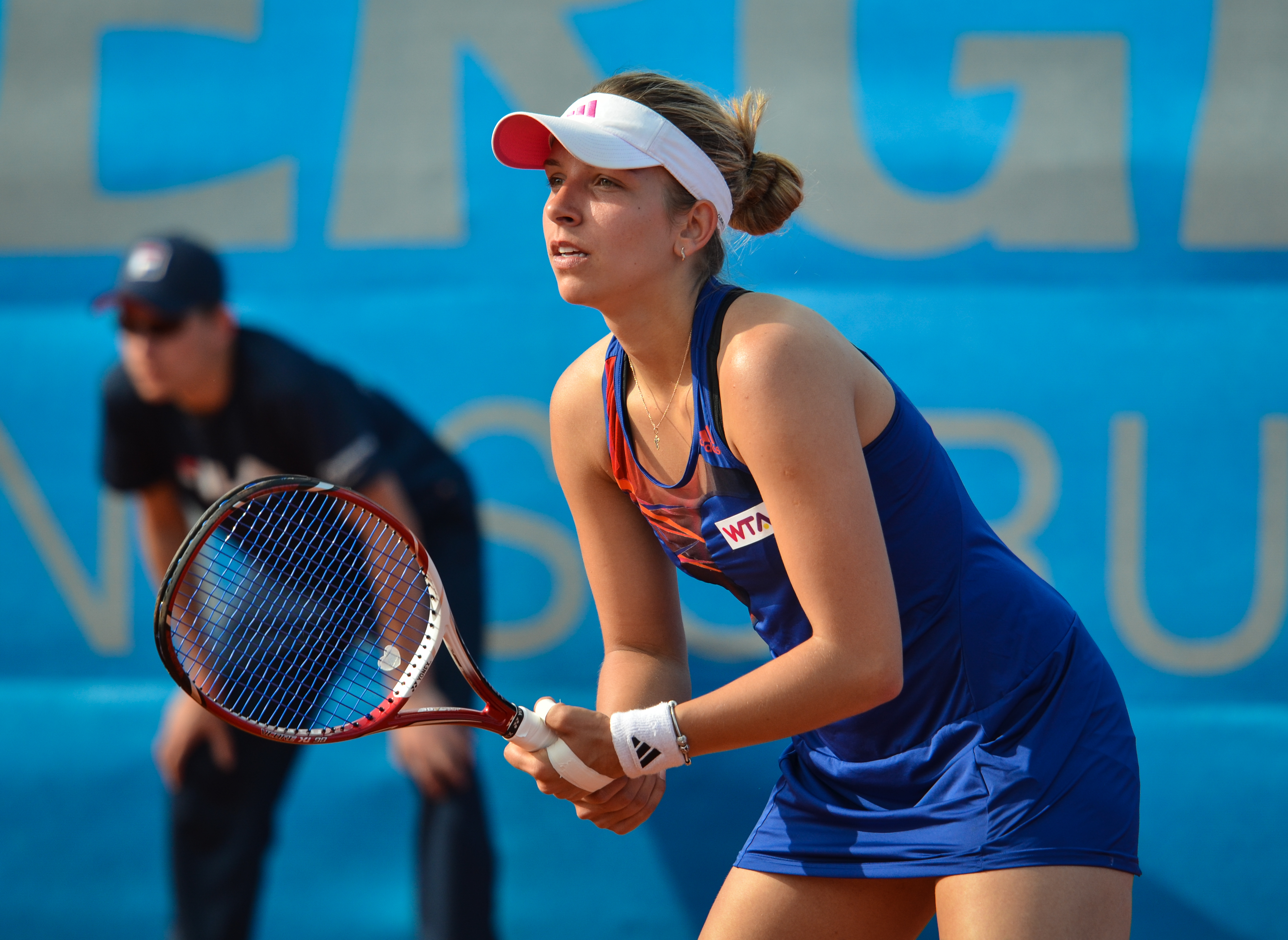
- Country (sports): Belarus
- Residence: Minsk, Belarus
- Born: 21 March 1992 (age 34) Minsk
- Height: 1.81 m (5 ft 11 in)
- Plays: Right-handed (two-handed backhand)
- Prize money: $56,264

Singles
- Career record: 91–88
- Career titles: 0
- Highest ranking: No. 287 (23 July 2012)

Doubles
- Career record: 90–81
- Career titles: 1 WTA, 6 ITF
- Highest ranking: No. 136 (22 October 2012)

Polina Pekhova (Belarusian: Паліна Пехава; Russian: Полина Пехова; born 21 March 1992) is a Belarusian former tennis player. She achieved her career-high WTA rankings of 287 in singles, on 23 July 2012, and 136 in doubles, on 22 October 2012.

== WTA career finals ==
=== Doubles: 1 title ===
Legend
Grand Slam
Premier M & Premier 5
Premier
International (1–0)

Result	Date	Tournament	Surface	Partner	Opponents	Score
Win	Sep 2012	Tashkent Open, Uzbekistan	Hard	(Poland) Paula Kania	(Russia) Anna Chakvetadze (Serbia) Vesna Dolonc	6–2, ret.

== ITF Circuit finals ==
$25,000 tournaments
$15,000 tournaments
$10,000 tournaments

=== Singles: 1 (0–1) ===
Result	No.	Date	Tournament	Surface	Opponent	Score
Loss	1.	May 2010	ITF Florence, Italy	Clay	(Romania) Liana Ungur	3–6, 5–7

=== Doubles: 9 (6–3) ===
Result	No.	Date	Tournament	Surface	Partner	Opponents	Score
Loss	1.	May 2010	ITF Florence, Italy	Clay	(China) Lu Jingjing	(Estonia) Maret Ani (Germany) Julia Schruff	3–6, 4–6
Win	1.	Nov 2010	ITF Opole, Poland	Carpet (i)	(Georgia (country)) Oksana Kalashnikova	(Poland) Paula Kania (Poland) Magda Linette	6–3, 6–4
Win	2.	May 2012	ITF Moscow, Russia	Hard (i)	(Poland) Paula Kania	(Russia) Tatiana Kotelnikova (Belarus) Lidziya Marozava	6–4, 3–6, [10–7]
Win	3.	Jun 2013	ITF Qarshi, Uzbekistan	Hard	(Russia) Margarita Gasparyan	(Ukraine) Veronika Kapshay (Serbia) Teodora Mirčić	6–2, 6–1
Win	4.	Sep 2013	Fergana Challenger, Uzbekistan	Hard	(Ukraine) Lyudmyla Kichenok	(Slovakia) Michaela Hončová (Ukraine) Veronika Kapshay	6–4, 6–2
Loss	2.	Aug 2014	ITF Astana, Kazakhstan	Hard	(Belarus) Sviatlana Pirazhenka	(Russia) Polina Monova (Russia) Ekaterina Yashina	3–6, 2–6
Win	5.	Oct 2014	ITF Shymkent, Kazakhstan	Clay	(Uzbekistan) Albina Khabibulina	(Kyrgyzstan) Ksenia Palkina (Kazakhstan) Alexandra Grinchishina	w/o
Loss	3.	Oct 2014	ITF Shymkent, Kazakhstan	Clay	(Russia) Daria Lodikova	(Uzbekistan) Albina Khabibulina (Kazakhstan) Ekaterina Kylueva	4–6, 4–6
Win	6.	Jul 2017	Telavi Open, Georgia	Clay	(Russia) Maria Solnyshkina	(Georgia (country)) Mariam Bolkvadze (Georgia (country)) Ekaterine Gorgodze	6–2, 1–6, [10–7]
