= Vesna Dolonc =

Serbian tennis player

Vesna Dolonc Весна Долонц
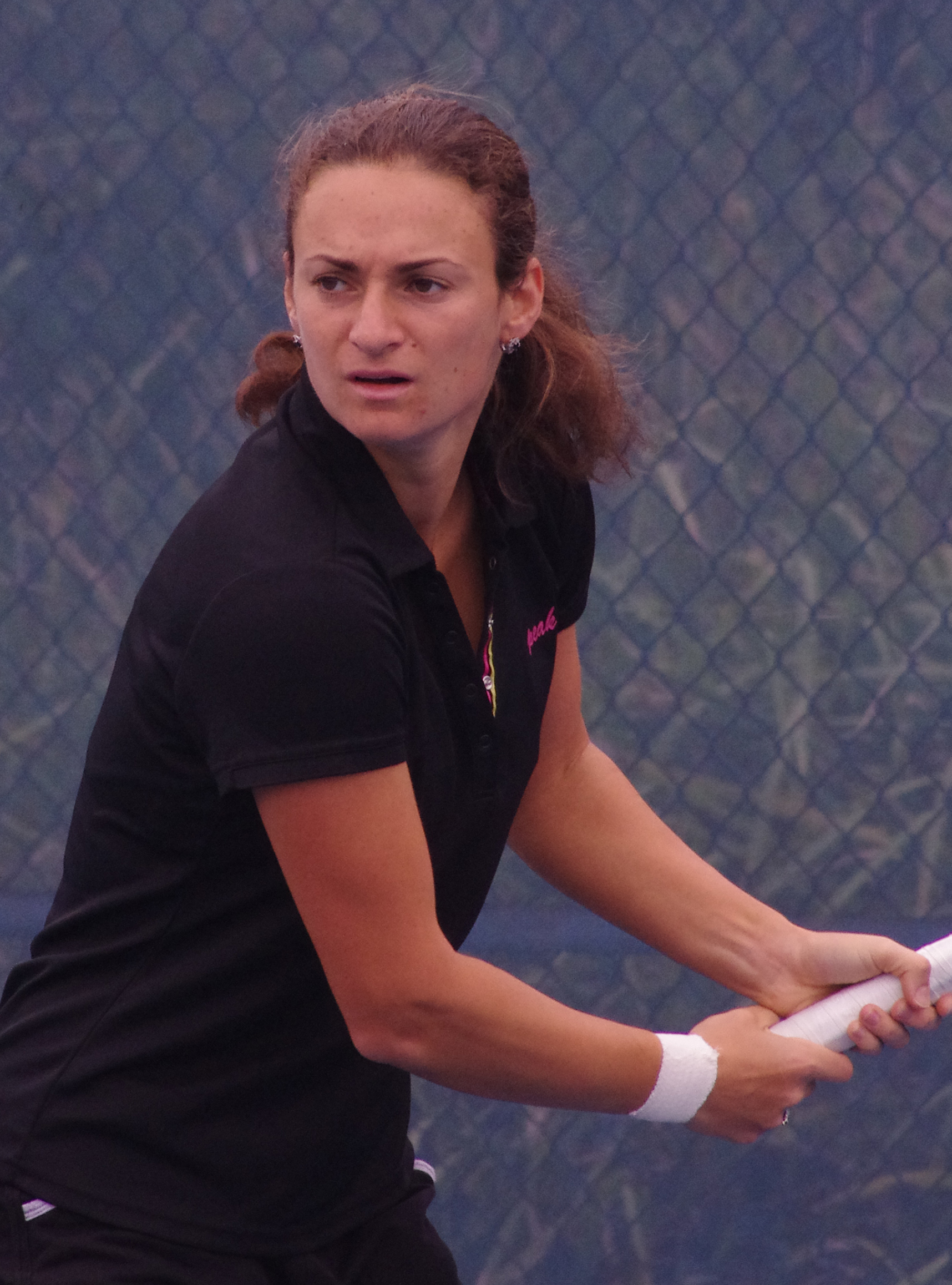
- Dolonc in 2014
- Country (sports): Russia (2006–April 2012); Serbia (May 2012–2017)
- Residence: Moscow, Russia
- Born: 21 July 1989 (age 36) Moscow, Russian SFSR, Soviet Union
- Height: 1.70 m (5 ft 7 in)
- Turned pro: 2006
- Retired: 14 February 2017
- Plays: Right-handed (two-handed backhand)
- Prize money: US$900,034

Singles
- Career record: 323–219
- Career titles: 3 ITF
- Highest ranking: No. 84 (8 July 2013)

Grand Slam singles results
- Australian Open: 3R (2011)
- French Open: 2R (2011)
- Wimbledon: 3R (2013)
- US Open: 1R (2009, 2011, 2013)

Doubles
- Career record: 126–103
- Career titles: 5 ITF
- Highest ranking: No. 93 (4 February 2013)

Grand Slam doubles results
- Wimbledon: 1R (2011, 2012, 2013, 2014)

Team competitions
- Fed Cup: 1–4

Vesna Ratkovna Dolonc (Serbian Cyrillic and Russian: Весна Ратковна Долонц; née Manasieva, Манасиева; born 21 July 1989) is a retired Serbian tennis player. She earned career-highs of 84 in singles and 93 in doubles.

== Career ==
Dolonc began competing on the ITF Circuit in September 2005, soon after her 16th birthday, and had risen to world No. 152 by 28 January 2008.

In February 2006, she won seven successive matches to come through qualifying and reached the semifinals of the $10k event at Portimão, Portugal, and in May 2006, she reached her first $10k final in Kyiv, Ukraine. In 2007, she reached the semifinals at Stockholm-Salk ($25k level); Monzón, Spain ($75k level); Moscow ($25k level); and Podolsk, Russia ($25k level). In September 2007, she made it to the finals at the $100k tournament inn Kharkiv, Ukraine.

In 2008, she qualified for her third career WTA Tour main draw at Pattaya, defeated fifth-seeded Angelique Kerber of Germany with the loss of only three games, and reached her first WTA Tour quarterfinals.

Dolonc qualified for the 2011 Australian Open, and in the second round, defeated No. 17 Marion Bartoli in three sets.

In July 2012, she won her second career title in Donetsk.

=== 2013 ===
Dolonc began her season at the Brisbane International. She lost in the first round of qualifying to María José Martínez Sánchez. Despite qualifying for the Australian Open, Dolonc was defeated in the second round by eleventh seed Marion Bartoli.

In Paris at the Open GdF Suez, Dolonc lost in the final round of qualifying to Monica Niculescu. During the Fed Cup tie versus Slovakia, Dolonc won her first rubber when Dominika Cibulková retired due to a leg muscle strain. In her second rubber, she was defeated by Daniela Hantuchová. Serbia ended up losing the tie 2–3.

=== 2014 ===
Dolonc announced her retirement from pro circuit on 14 February 2017 (her last match she played in November 2016).

== Performance timelines ==
Key
| W | F | SF | QF | #R | RR | Q# | P# | DNQ | A | Z# | PO | G | S | B | NMS | NTI | P | NH |

(W) winner; (F) finalist; (SF) semifinalist; (QF) quarterfinalist; (#R) rounds 4, 3, 2, 1; (RR) round-robin stage; (Q#) qualification round; (P#) preliminary round; (DNQ) did not qualify; (A) absent; (Z#) Davis/Fed Cup Zonal Group (with number indication) or (PO) play-off; (G) gold, (S) silver or (B) bronze Olympic/Paralympic medal; (NMS) not a Masters tournament; (NTI) not a Tier I tournament; (P) postponed; (NH) not held; (SR) strike rate (events won / competed); (W–L) win–loss record.
To avoid confusion and double counting, these charts are updated at the conclusion of a tournament or when the player's participation has ended.

Only main-draw results in WTA Tour, Grand Slam tournaments, Fed Cup and Olympic Games are included in win–loss records.

Note: Dolonc played under Russian flag until 2012.

=== Singles ===
| Tournament | 2007 | 2008 | 2009 | 2010 | 2011 | 2012 | 2013 | 2014 | SR | W–L | Win% |
|---|---|---|---|---|---|---|---|---|---|---|---|
Grand Slam tournaments
| Australian Open | A | Q3 | Q1 | Q3 | 3R | Q1 | 2R | 2R | 0 / 3 | 4–3 | 57% |
| French Open | A | Q1 | Q1 | Q3 | 2R | Q2 | 1R | Q3 | 0 / 2 | 1–2 | 33% |
| Wimbledon | A | Q2 | 1R | Q3 | 1R | 1R | 3R | Q1 | 0 / 4 | 2–4 | 33% |
| US Open | A | Q1 | 1R | Q2 | 1R | Q2 | 1R | Q1 | 0 / 3 | 0–3 | 0% |
| Win–loss | 0–0 | 0–0 | 0–2 | 0–0 | 3–4 | 0–1 | 3–4 | 1–1 | 0 / 12 | 7–12 | 37% |
National representation
| Fed Cup | A | A | A | A | A | A | QF | WG2 | 0 / 2 | 1–3 | 25% |
Premier Mandatory & 5 + former
| Dubai / Qatar Open (Note: The first Premier 5 event of the year has switched back and forth between the Dubai Tennis Championships and the Qatar Ladies Open since 2009. Dubai was classified as a Premier 5 event from 2009 to 2011 before being succeeded by Doha for the 2012–2014 period. In 2015, Dubai regained its Premier 5 status while Doha was demoted to Premier status. The Premier 5 tournaments were reclassified as WTA 1000 tournaments in 2021.) | A | A | Q2 | 1R | Q2 | A | A | A | 0 / 1 | 0–1 | 0% |
| Indian Wells Open | A | A | A | A | Q2 | A | Q1 | A | 0 / 0 | 0–0 | – |
| Miami Open | A | A | A | Q1 | 1R | A | Q1 | A | 0 / 1 | 0–1 | 0% |
| Cincinnati Open | A | A | A | A | A | A | Q2 | A | 0 / 0 | 0–0 | – |
| China Open | A | A | A | A | A | A | Q1 | A | 0 / 0 | 0–0 | – |
| Kremlin Cup (former) | A | Q1 | A | A | A | A | A | A | 0 / 0 | 0–0 | – |
Career statistics
| Tournaments | 1 | 3 | 4 | 4 | 10 | 4 | 10 | 4 | Career total: 40 | | |
| Overall win–loss | 1–1 | 3–3 | 2–4 | 0–4 | 6–10 | 2–4 | 8–11 | 2–6 | 0 / 40 | 24–43 | 36% |
| Year-end ranking | 162 | 144 | 131 | 140 | 111 | 117 | 103 | 208 | $900,034 | | |

=== Doubles ===
| Tournament | 2006 | 2007 | 2008 | 2009 | 2010 | 2011 | 2012 | 2013 | 2014 | 2015 | SR | W–L |
|---|---|---|---|---|---|---|---|---|---|---|---|---|
Grand Slam tournaments
| Australian Open | A | A | A | A | A | A | A | A | A | A | 0 / 0 | 0–0 |
| French Open | A | A | A | A | A | A | A | A | A | A | 0 / 0 | 0–0 |
| Wimbledon | A | A | A | A | Q2 | 1R | 1R | 1R | 1R | A | 0 / 4 | 0–4 |
| US Open | A | A | A | A | A | A | A | A | A | A | 0 / 0 | 0–0 |
National representation
| Fed Cup | A | A | A | A | A | A | A | QF | WG2 | A | 0 / 2 | 0–1 |
Career statistics
| Tournaments | 0 | 1 | 5 | 2 | 2 | 4 | 3 | 9 | 1 | 0 | 27 | |
| Titles | 0 | 0 | 0 | 0 | 0 | 0 | 0 | 0 | 0 | 0 | 0 | |
| Finals | 0 | 0 | 0 | 0 | 0 | 0 | 1 | 0 | 0 | 0 | 1 | |
| Overall win–loss | 0–0 | 0–1 | 2–5 | 1–2 | 4–2 | 3–4 | 3–3 | 4–9 | 0–1 | 0–0 | 0 / 27 | 17–27 |
| Year-end ranking | 582 | 202 | 292 | 160 | 144 | 158 | 103 | 124 | 481 | 647 | 39% | |

== WTA Tour finals ==
=== Doubles: 1 (runner–up) ===
| Legend International (0–1) | Finals by surface Hard (0–1) |

| Result | W–L | Date | Tournament | Tier | Surface | Partner | Opponents | Score |
|---|---|---|---|---|---|---|---|---|
| Loss | 0–1 | Sep 2012 | Tashkent Open, Uzbekistan | International | Hard | (Russia) Anna Chakvetadze | (Poland) Paula Kania (Belarus) Polina Pekhova | 2–6, ret. |

== ITF Circuit finals ==
=== Singles: 11 (3 titles, 8 runner-ups) ===
| Legend $100,000 tournaments $50,000 tournaments $25,000 tournaments $10,000 tournaments | Finals by surface Hard (2–5) Clay (1–1) Carpet (0–2) |

| Result | W–L | Date | Tournament | Tier | Surface | Opponent | Score |
|---|---|---|---|---|---|---|---|
| Loss | | May 2006 | ITF Kyiv, Ukraine | 10,000 | Clay | (Ukraine) Veronika Kapshay | 2–6, 6–0, 5–7 |
| Loss | | Sep 2007 | ITF Kharkiv, Ukraine | 100,000 | Hard | (Ukraine) Alona Bondarenko | 1–6, 1–6 |
| Loss | | Feb 2008 | ITF Capriolo, Italy | 25,000 | Carpet (i) | (United Kingdom) Anne Keothavong | 1–6, 6–2, 3–6 |
| Win | | Nov 2008 | Open Nantes Atlantique, France | 50,000 | Hard (i) | (Switzerland) Stefanie Vögele | 6–3, 6–2 |
| Loss | | Feb 2009 | ITF Belfort, France | 25,000 | Carpet (i) | (Czech Republic) Lucie Hradecká | 3–6, 2–6 |
| Loss | | Mar 2009 | ITF Moscow, Russia | 25,000 | Hard (i) | (Russia) Vitalia Diatchenko | 6–2, 3–6, 1–4 ret. |
| Loss | | Jul 2009 | ITF La Coruña, Spain | 25,000 | Hard | (Portugal) Neuza Silva | 3–6, 1–6 |
| Loss | | Oct 2010 | Open de Touraine, France | 50,000 | Hard (i) | (United States) Alison Riske | 7–5, 4–6, 4–6 |
| Win | | Jul 2012 | Viccourt Cup Donetsk, Ukraine | 50,000 | Hard | (Portugal) Maria João Koehler | 6–2, 6–3 |
| Loss | | Mar 2016 | ITF Mâcon, France | 10,000 | Hard (i) | (France) Claire Feuerstein | 2–6, 6–4, 4–6 |
| Win | | May 2016 | ITF Győr, Hungary | 10,000 | Clay | (Ukraine) Anastasiya Shoshyna | 6–3, 7–5 |

=== Doubles: 14 (5 titles, 9 runner-ups) ===
| Legend $100,000 tournaments $75,000 tournaments $50,000 tournaments $25,000 tournaments $15,000 tournaments | Finals by surface Hard (3–7) Clay (2–2) |

| Result | W–L | Date | Tournament | Tier | Surface | Partner | Opponents | Score |
|---|---|---|---|---|---|---|---|---|
| Loss | | Oct 2005 | ITF Podgorica, Serbia and Montenegro | 10,000 | Clay | (Serbia) Neda Kozić | (Croatia) Ani Mijačika (Bosnia and Herzegovina) Dijana Stojić | 6–1, 3–6, 4–6 |
| Loss | | May 2007 | Torneo Conchita Martínez, Spain | 75,000 | Hard | (France) Iryna Brémond | (Spain) Estrella Cabeza-Candela (Argentina) María Emilia Salerni | 2–6, 1–6 |
| Win | | Aug 2007 | ITF Moscow, Russia | 25,000 | Clay | (Russia) Maria Kondratieva | (Russia) Nina Bratchikova (France) Sophie Lefèvre | 6–2, 6–1 |
| Loss | | Nov 2007 | ITF Minsk, Belarus | 50,000 | Hard (i) | (Russia) Ekaterina Lopes | (Russia) Alla Kudryavtseva (Russia) Anastasia Pavlyuchenkova | 0–6, 2–6 |
| Win | | Apr 2009 | ITF Monzón, Spain | 75,000 | Hard | (Chinese Taipei) Chen Yi | (Italy) Alberta Brianti (Georgia (country)) Margalita Chakhnashvili | 2–6, 6–4, [10–8] |
| Loss | | Jul 2009 | ITF La Coruña, Spain | 25,000 | Hard | (Belarus) Ksenia Milevskaya | (Argentina) María Irigoyen (Argentina) Florencia Molinero | 2–6, 4–6 |
| Loss | | Nov 2009 | ITF Minsk, Belarus | 50,000 | Hard (i) | (Russia) Evgeniya Rodina | (Ukraine) Lyudmyla Kichenok (Ukraine) Nadiya Kichenok | 3–6, 6–7^{(7)} |
| Loss | | Sep 2010 | GB Pro-Series Shrewsbury, United Kingdom | 75,000 | Hard (i) | (France) Claire Feuerstein | (Russia) Vitalia Diatchenko (France) Irena Pavlovic | 4–6, 6–4, [6–10] |
| Loss | | Jul 2011 | Cuneo International, Italia | 100,000 | Clay | (Czech Republic) Eva Birnerová | (Luxembourg) Mandy Minella (Switzerland) Stefanie Vögele | 3–6, 2–6 |
| Loss | | Feb 2012 | Dow Corning Midland, United States | 100,000 | Hard (i) | (France) Stéphanie Foretz Gacon | (Czech Republic) Andrea Hlaváčková (Czech Republic) Lucie Hradecká | 6–7^{(4)}, 2–6 |
| Win | | May 2012 | Open Saint-Gaudens, France | 50,000 | Clay | (Russia) Irina Khromacheva | (United Kingdom) Naomi Broady (Israel) Julia Glushko | 6–2, 6–0 |
| Win | | Sep 2012 | GB Pro-Series Shrewsbury, United Kingdom | 75,000 | Hard (i) | (Switzerland) Stefanie Vögele | (Czech Republic) Karolína Plíšková (Czech Republic) Kristýna Plíšková | 6–1, 6–7^{(3)}, [15–13] |
| Win | | Nov 2012 | GB Pro-Series Barnstaple, United Kingdom | 75,000 | Hard (i) | (Uzbekistan) Akgul Amanmuradova | (Belarus) Aliaksandra Sasnovich (Latvia) Diāna Marcinkēviča | 6–3, 6–1 |
| Loss | | Aug 2013 | Viccourt Cup Donetsk, Ukraine | 75,000 | Hard | (Russia) Alexandra Panova | (Ukraine) Yuliya Beygelzimer (Czech Republic) Renata Voráčová | 1–6, 4–6 |

== Personal life ==
She was born to a Serbian father Ratko Manasiev and a Russian mother. She changed her surname from "Manasieva" to "Dolonc" (Dolonts) when she was married to Arsen Dolonts on 1 October 2010.
