= 2011 Aegon Pro-Series Loughborough – Women's doubles =

Women's doubles
- 2011 Aegon Pro-Series Loughborough

Final
- Champions: (United Kingdom) Tara Moore (United Kingdom) Francesca Stephenson
- Runners-up: (Denmark) Malou Ejdesgaard (United Kingdom) Amanda Elliott
- Score: 3–6, 6–2, [10–3]

Events
| Singles | men | women |
| Doubles | men | women |
| ← 2010 · | Aegon Pro-Series Loughborough | · 2012 → |

Jocelyn Rae and Jade Windley were the defending champions, but both chose not to participate.

Tara Moore and Francesca Stephenson won the title defeating Malou Ejdesgaard and Amanda Elliott in the final 3–6, 6–2, [10–3].

== Seeds ==
1. (Denmark) Malou Ejdesgaard / (United Kingdom) Amanda Elliott (final)
2. (Czech Republic) Martina Borecká / (Czech Republic) Petra Krejsová (quarterfinals)
3. (France) Elixane Lechemia / (France) Morgane Pons (quarterfinals)
4. (United Kingdom) Tara Moore / (United Kingdom) Francesca Stephenson (champions)

== Draw ==
=== Key ===
- Q = Qualifier
- WC = Wild card
- LL = Lucky loser
- Alt = Alternate
- SE = Special exempt
- PR = Protected ranking
- ITF = ITF entry
- JE = Junior exempt
- w/o = Walkover
- r = Retired
- d = Defaulted
- SR = Special ranking

=== Draw ===
First round
(United Kingdom) G Bastick (United Kingdom) H Richards | 4 | 7 | [6]
(Netherlands) V Podda (Netherlands) J Schoelink | 6 | 5 | [10]
3 | (France) E Lechemia (France) M Pons | 7 | 7^{7}
(United Kingdom) K Boulter (United Kingdom) H Dart | 5 | 6^{2}
(United Kingdom) L Brown (United Kingdom) A Walker | 6 | 6
(United Kingdom) J Drew (Spain) V Foltinger García | 0 | 2
(Mexico) C Betancourt (Australia) A Krysiak | 1 | 2
(Australia) C Rigozzi (United States) C Whoriskey | 6 | 6
(United Kingdom) A Gibson (United Kingdom) M Ince | 1 | 6^{4}
4 | (United Kingdom) T Moore (United Kingdom) F Stephenson | 6 | 7^{7}
(Germany) C Daniels (Germany) L Schäder | 0 | 6 | [3]
(Republic of Ireland) A Bowtell (United Kingdom) E Dean | 6 | 4 | [10]
(United Kingdom) M Ankutse (United Kingdom) G Praditngam | 0 | 0
2 | (Czech Republic) M Borecká (Czech Republic) P Krejsová | 6 | 6

Quarterfinals
1 | (Denmark) M Ejdesgaard (United Kingdom) A Elliott | 6 | 6
(Netherlands) V Podda (Netherlands) J Schoelink | 0 | 2
3 | (France) E Lechemia (France) M Pons | 6^{6} | 4
(United Kingdom) L Brown (United Kingdom) A Walker | 7^{8} | 6
(Australia) C Rigozzi (United States) C Whoriskey | 1 | 5
4 | (United Kingdom) T Moore (United Kingdom) F Stephenson | 6 | 7
(Republic of Ireland) A Bowtell (United Kingdom) E Dean | 7 | 7^{7}
2 | (Czech Republic) M Borecká (Czech Republic) P Krejsová | 5 | 6^{3}

Semifinals
1 | (Denmark) M Ejdesgaard (United Kingdom) A Elliott | 4 | 6 | [10]
(United Kingdom) L Brown (United Kingdom) A Walker | 6 | 3 | [8]
4 | (United Kingdom) T Moore (United Kingdom) F Stephenson | 6 | 6
(Republic of Ireland) A Bowtell (United Kingdom) E Dean | 4 | 1

Finals
1 | (Denmark) M Ejdesgaard (United Kingdom) A Elliott | 6 | 2 | [3]
4 | (United Kingdom) T Moore (United Kingdom) F Stephenson | 3 | 6 | [10]
