= 2012 Aegon Pro-Series Loughborough – Women's singles =

Women's singles
- 2012 Aegon Pro-Series Loughborough

Final
- Champion: (Czech Republic) Renata Voráčová
- Runner-up: (Germany) Julia Kimmelmann
- Score: 7–5, 6–7^{(6–8)}, 6–3

Events
Singles	men	women
Doubles	men	women
← 2011 ·	Aegon Pro-Series Loughborough	· 2013 →

Tara Moore was the defending champion, but didn't compete in 2012.

Renata Voráčová won the title, defeating Julia Kimmelmann in the final, 7–5, 6–7^{(6–8)}, 6–3.

== Seeds ==
1. (Czech Republic) Renata Voráčová (champion)
2. (Netherlands) Quirine Lemoine (semifinals)
3. (Germany) Kim Grajdek (first round)
4. (Republic of Ireland) Amy Bowtell (first round)
5. (United Kingdom) Jade Windley (quarterfinals)
6. (Germany) Julia Kimmelmann (final)
7. (Romania) Ana Bogdan (semifinals)
8. (United Kingdom) Anna Fitzpatrick (first round)

== Main draw ==
=== Key ===
- Q = Qualifier
- WC = Wild card
- LL = Lucky loser
- Alt = Alternate
- SE = Special exempt
- PR = Protected ranking
- ITF = ITF entry
- JE = Junior exempt
- w/o = Walkover
- r = Retired
- d = Defaulted
- SR = Special ranking

=== Finals ===
Semifinals
1	(Czech Republic) Renata Voráčová	6^{5}	6	6
7	(Romania) Ana Bogdan	7^{7}	2	4
6	(Germany) Julia Kimmelmann	6	6
2	(Netherlands) Quirine Lemoine	0	4

Final
1	(Czech Republic) Renata Voráčová	7	6^{8}	6
6	(Germany) Julia Kimmelmann	5	7^{10}	3

=== Top half ===
First round
1	(Czech Republic) R Voráčová	6	6
(France) A Cazeaux	4	1
Q	(United Kingdom) G Dixon	0	6	4
(Germany) S Kayser	6	3	6
Q	(United Kingdom) G Craven	4	6	5
(Italy) F Sella	6	0	7
Q	(United Kingdom) A Elliott	3	4
5	(United Kingdom) J Windley	6	6
3	(Germany) K Grajdek	3	4
Q	(Netherlands) J Schoelink	6	6
(Switzerland) T Sugnaux	5	4
WC	(United Kingdom) A Smith	7	6
(United Kingdom) L Brown	6	6
Q	(United Kingdom) E Banos-Gregorians	0	3
(Germany) C Daniels	3	5
7	(Romania) A Bogdan	6	7

Second round
1	(Czech Republic) R Voráčová	6	6
(Germany) S Kayser	0	4
(Italy) F Sella	0^{r}
5	(United Kingdom) J Windley	4
Q	(Netherlands) J Schoelink	6	7^{7}
WC	(United Kingdom) A Smith	4	6^{3}
(United Kingdom) L Brown	1	4
7	(Romania) A Bogdan	6	6

Quarterfinals
1	(Czech Republic) R Voráčová	6	6
5	(United Kingdom) J Windley	3	1
Q	(Netherlands) J Schoelink	0	0^{r}
7	(Romania) A Bogdan	6	1

Semifinals
1	(Czech Republic) R Voráčová	6^{5}	6	6
7	(Romania) A Bogdan	7^{7}	2	4

=== Bottom half ===
First round
6	(Germany) J Kimmelmann	6	6
(Denmark) K Barbat	3	4
Q	(United Kingdom) D Konotoptseva	0	2
(Russia) A Smolina	6	6
(United Kingdom) F Stephenson	6	6
WC	(United Kingdom) J Brown	0	3
Q	(United States) K Ruckert	4	6	6
4	(Republic of Ireland) A Bowtell	6	4	4
8	(United Kingdom) A Fitzpatrick	4	2
Q	(France) O Adam	6	6
(Switzerland) L Michel	6	4	3
WC	(United Kingdom) K Boulter	2	6	6
(United Kingdom) S Bamburac	3	2
(United States) T Kinard	6	6
WC	(United Kingdom) E Silva	1	3
2	(Netherlands) Q Lemoine	6	6

Second round
6	(Germany) J Kimmelmann	6	6^{5}	6
(Russia) A Smolina	0	7^{7}	0
(United Kingdom) F Stephenson	6	6
Q	(United States) K Ruckert	3	1
Q	(France) O Adam	0	3
WC	(United Kingdom) K Boulter	6	6
(United States) T Kinard	2	1
2	(Netherlands) Q Lemoine	6	6

Quarterfinals
6	(Germany) J Kimmelmann	4	6	6
(United Kingdom) F Stephenson	6	4	1
WC	(United Kingdom) K Boulter	3	4
2	(Netherlands) Q Lemoine	6	6

Semifinals
6	(Germany) J Kimmelmann	6	6
2	(Netherlands) Q Lemoine	0	4
