= 2012 Aegon Pro-Series Loughborough – Women's doubles =

Women's doubles
- 2012 Aegon Pro-Series Loughborough

Final
- Champions: (United Kingdom) Anna Fitzpatrick (United Kingdom) Jade Windley
- Runners-up: (Denmark) Karen Barbat (Switzerland) Lara Michel
- Score: 6–2, 6–2

Events
Singles	men	women
Doubles	men	women
← 2011 ·	Aegon Pro-Series Loughborough	· 2013 →

Tara Moore and Francesca Stephenson were the defending champions. Moore did not compete in 2012; Stephenson partnered up with Amanda Elliott, but lost in the semifinals.

Anna Fitzpatrick and Jade Windley won the title, defeating Karen Barbat and Lara Michel in the final, 6–2, 6–2.

== Seeds ==
1. (United Kingdom) Anna Fitzpatrick / (United Kingdom) Jade Windley (champions)
2. (Republic of Ireland) Amy Bowtell / (United Kingdom) Lucy Brown (quarterfinals)
3. (Denmark) Karen Barbat / (Switzerland) Lara Michel (final)
4. (United Kingdom) Amanda Elliott / (United Kingdom) Francesca Stephenson (semifinals)

== Draw ==
=== Key ===
- Q = Qualifier
- WC = Wild card
- LL = Lucky loser
- Alt = Alternate
- SE = Special exempt
- PR = Protected ranking
- ITF = ITF entry
- JE = Junior exempt
- w/o = Walkover
- r = Retired
- d = Defaulted
- SR = Special ranking

First round
(Germany) C Daniels (Germany) F König	6	6
(United Kingdom) A Watts (United Kingdom) S Watts	2	3
(United States) T Kinard (United States) K Ruckert	6^{5}	1
(United Kingdom) S Bamburac (United Kingdom) A Smith	7^{7}	6

Quarterfinals
1	(United Kingdom) A Fitzpatrick (United Kingdom) J Windley	6	7^{7}
(Germany) C Daniels (Germany) F König	4	6^{5}
4	(United Kingdom) A Elliott (United Kingdom) F Stephenson	1	6	[10]
(Netherlands) J Schoelink (Netherlands) C van der Meij	6	4	[5]
(Romania) A Bogdan (Russia) A Smolina	3	2
3	(Denmark) K Barbat (Switzerland) L Michel	6	6
(United Kingdom) S Bamburac (United Kingdom) A Smith	5	6	[10]
2	(Republic of Ireland) A Bowtell (United Kingdom) L Brown	7	0	[5]

Semifinals
1	(United Kingdom) A Fitzpatrick (United Kingdom) J Windley	3	6	[10]
4	(United Kingdom) A Elliott (United Kingdom) F Stephenson	6	1	[7]
3	(Denmark) K Barbat (Switzerland) L Michel	6	6
(United Kingdom) S Bamburac (United Kingdom) A Smith	3	4

Finals
1	(United Kingdom) A Fitzpatrick (United Kingdom) J Windley	6	6
3	(Denmark) K Barbat (Switzerland) L Michel	2	2
