= 2011 Aegon Pro-Series Loughborough – Women's singles =

Women's singles
- 2011 Aegon Pro-Series Loughborough

Final
- Champion: (United Kingdom) Tara Moore
- Runner-up: (France) Myrtille Georges
- Score: 7–6^{(7–5)}, 5–7, 6–4

Events
Singles	men	women
Doubles	men	women
← 2010 ·	Aegon Pro-Series Loughborough	· 2012 →

Lara Michel was the defending champion, but chose not to participate.

Tara Moore won the title defeating Myrtille Georges in the final 7–6^{(7–5)}, 5–7, 6–4.

== Seeds ==
1. (United Kingdom) Tara Moore (champion)
2. (France) Elixane Lechemia (quarterfinals)
3. (France) Myrtille Georges (final)
4. (United Kingdom) Lucy Brown (quarterfinals)
5. (France) Morgane Pons (second round)
6. (Republic of Ireland) Amy Bowtell (semifinals)
7. (Czech Republic) Kateřina Vaňková (second round)
8. (Czech Republic) Martina Borecká (semifinals)

== Draw ==
=== Key ===
- Q = Qualifier
- WC = Wild card
- LL = Lucky loser
- Alt = Alternate
- SE = Special exempt
- PR = Protected ranking
- ITF = ITF entry
- JE = Junior exempt
- w/o = Walkover
- r = Retired
- d = Defaulted
- SR = Special ranking

=== Finals ===
Semifinals
1	(United Kingdom) Tara Moore	6	6
6	(Republic of Ireland) Amy Bowtell	1	2
3	(France) Myrtille Georges	7	6
8	(Czech Republic) Martina Borecká	5	2

Final
1	(United Kingdom) Tara Moore	7^{7}	5	6
3	(France) Myrtille Georges	6^{5}	7	4

=== Top half ===
First round
1	(United Kingdom) T Moore	6	6
WC	(United Kingdom) H Dart	0	4
WC	(United Kingdom) E Silva	6^{5}	6	6
(United Kingdom) A Walker	7^{7}	0	4
Q	(Netherlands) J Schoelink	5	6	1
(France) L Brouleau	7	4	6
Q	(United Kingdom) H Richards	1	3
7	(Czech Republic) K Vaňková	6	6
4	(United Kingdom) L Brown	7^{7}	6
(France) J Adam	6^{1}	1
WC	(United Kingdom) E Devine	6	6
Q	(United Kingdom) T William	4	3
(United States) C Whoriskey	6	6
Q	(United Kingdom) K Dunford	1	2
Q	(United Kingdom) A Gibson	6	3	3
6	(Republic of Ireland) A Bowtell	4	6	6

Second round
1	(United Kingdom) T Moore	6	6
WC	(United Kingdom) E Silva	2	4
(France) L Brouleau	6	7^{7}
7	(Czech Republic) K Vaňková	4	6^{1}
4	(United Kingdom) L Brown	6	6
WC	(United Kingdom) E Devine	3	3
(United States) C Whoriskey	2	3
6	(Republic of Ireland) A Bowtell	6	6

Quarterfinals
1	(United Kingdom) T Moore	6	6
(France) L Brouleau	3	1
4	(United Kingdom) L Brown	5	6	6^{5}
6	(Republic of Ireland) A Bowtell	7	0	7^{7}

Semifinals
1	(United Kingdom) T Moore	6	6
6	(Republic of Ireland) A Bowtell	1	2

=== Bottom half ===
First round
5	(France) M Pons	6	6
Q	(United Kingdom) A Barnett	4	3
(France) A Pain	3	6	6
(Denmark) M Ejdesgaard	6	4	2
Q	(United Kingdom) G Craven	4	4
Q	(Netherlands) V Podda	6	6
(Germany) L Schäder	5	4
3	(France) M Georges	7	6
8	(Czech Republic) M Borecká	6	7
WC	(United Kingdom) K Boulter	1	5
(United Kingdom) E Dean	7	4	2
(Germany) C Daniels	5	6	6
(United Kingdom) F Stephenson	2	5
(Czech Republic) P Krejsová	6	7
(Mexico) C Betancourt	2	2
2	(France) E Lechemia	6	6

Second round
5	(France) M Pons	5	1
(France) A Pain	7	6
Q	(Netherlands) V Podda	2	1
3	(France) M Georges	6	6
8	(Czech Republic) M Borecká	7	6
(Germany) C Daniels	5	0
(Czech Republic) P Krejsová	3	1
2	(France) E Lechemia	6	6

Quarterfinals
(France) A Pain	4	3
3	(France) M Georges	6	6
8	(Czech Republic) M Borecká	6	7^{7}
2	(France) E Lechemia	2	6^{4}

Semifinals
3	(France) M Georges	7	6
8	(Czech Republic) M Borecká	5	2
