= 2011 Aegon Pro-Series Loughborough =

- Date: 7–13 November
- Edition: 2nd
- Surface: Hard
- Location: Loughborough, Great Britain

Champions

Men's singles
- (Germany) Tobias Kamke

Women's singles
- (United Kingdom) Tara Moore

Men's doubles
- (United Kingdom) Jamie Delgado / (United Kingdom) Jonathan Marray

Women's doubles
- (United Kingdom) Tara Moore / (United Kingdom) Francesca Stephenson
| ← 2010 · | Aegon Pro-Series Loughborough | · 2012 → |

The 2011 Aegon Pro-Series Loughborough was a professional tennis tournament played on hard courts. It was the second edition of the tournament which was part of the 2011 ATP Challenger Tour and the 2011 ITF Women's Circuit. It took place in Loughborough, Great Britain between 7 and 13 November 2011.

== ATP singles main-draw entrants ==
=== Seeds ===
| Country | Player | Rank^{1} | Seed |
|---|---|---|---|
| ITA | Flavio Cipolla | 80 | 1 |
| GER | Tobias Kamke | 96 | 2 |
| GER | Andreas Beck | 110 | 3 |
| JPN | Go Soeda | 117 | 4 |
| SVN | Grega Žemlja | 124 | 5 |
| AUT | Andreas Haider-Maurer | 129 | 6 |
| EST | Jürgen Zopp | 138 | 7 |
| GBR | James Ward | 157 | 8 |

- ^{1} Rankings are as of October 31, 2011.

=== Other entrants ===
The following players received wildcards into the singles main draw:

- (United Kingdom) Daniel Evans
- (United Kingdom) Oliver Golding
- (United Kingdom) Joshua Goodall
- (United Kingdom) Alexander Ward

The following players received entry from the qualifying draw:

- (United Kingdom) Daniel Cox
- (United Kingdom) Joshua Milton
- (Finland) Timo Nieminen
- (United Kingdom) Daniel Smethurst

== WTA entrants ==
=== Seeds ===
| Country | Player | Rank^{1} | Seed |
|---|---|---|---|
| GBR | Tara Moore | 333 | 1 |
| FRA | Elixane Lechemia | 422 | 2 |
| FRA | Myrtille Georges | 476 | 3 |
| GBR | Lucy Brown | 559 | 4 |
| FRA | Morgane Pons | 576 | 5 |
| IRL | Amy Bowtell | 599 | 6 |
| CZE | Kateřina Vaňková | 607 | 7 |
| CZE | Martina Borecká | 609 | 8 |

- ^{1} Rankings are as of October 31, 2011.

=== Other entrants ===
The following players received wildcards into the singles main draw:

- (United Kingdom) Katie Boulter
- (United Kingdom) Harriet Dart
- (United Kingdom) Emma Devine
- (United Kingdom) Eden Silva

The following players received entry from the qualifying draw:

- (United Kingdom) Alica Barnett
- (United Kingdom) Georgia Craven
- (United Kingdom) Kyria Dunford
- (United Kingdom) Aimee Gibson
- (Netherlands) Valeria Podda
- (United Kingdom) Holly Richards
- (Netherlands) Jade Schoelink
- (United Kingdom) Tiffany William

== Champions ==
=== Men's singles ===
(Germany) Tobias Kamke def. (Italy) Flavio Cipolla, 6–2, 7–5

=== Women's singles ===
(United Kingdom) Tara Moore def. (France) Myrtille Georges, 7–6^{(7–5)}, 5–7, 6–4

=== Men's doubles ===
(United Kingdom) Jamie Delgado / (United Kingdom) Jonathan Marray def. (Republic of Ireland) Sam Barry / (Republic of Ireland) Daniel Glancy, 6–2, 6–2

=== Women's doubles ===
(United Kingdom) Tara Moore / (United Kingdom) Francesca Stephenson def. (Denmark) Malou Ejdesgaard / (United Kingdom) Amanda Elliott, 3–6, 6–2, [10–3]
