= 2012 Aegon Pro-Series Loughborough – Men's doubles =

Men's doubles
- 2012 Aegon Pro-Series Loughborough

Final
- Champion: (United States) James Cerretani (Canada) Adil Shamasdin
- Runner-up: (India) Purav Raja (India) Divij Sharan
- Score: 6–4, 7–5

Events
Singles	men	women
Doubles	men	women
← 2011 ·	Aegon Pro-Series Loughborough	· 2013 →

Jamie Delgado and Jonathan Marray were the defending champions of the 2012 Aegon Pro-Series but they decided not to participate together this year.
Delgado played alongside Ken Skupski, while Marray was involved in the 2012 ATP World Tour Finals.
James Cerretani and Adil Shamasdin won the final 6–4, 7–5 against Purav Raja and Divij Sharan.

== Seeds ==
1. (United Kingdom) Jamie Delgado / (United Kingdom) Ken Skupski (quarterfinals)
2. (Sweden) Johan Brunström / (South Africa) Raven Klaasen (semifinals)
3. (United States) James Cerretani / (Canada) Adil Shamasdin (champions)
4. (India) Purav Raja / (India) Divij Sharan (final)

== Draw ==
Key

- Q = Qualifier
- WC = Wild card
- LL = Lucky loser
- Alt = Alternate
- ITF = ITF entry
- PR = Protected ranking
- SR = Special ranking
- SE = Special exempt
- JE = Junior exempt
- JR = Junior Accelerator Programme entrant
- CO = College Accelerator Programme entrant
- NG = Next Gen Accelerator Program entrant
- w/o = Walkover
- r = Retired
- d = Defaulted

=== Draw ===
First round
1	(United Kingdom) J Delgado (United Kingdom) K Skupski	7^{7}	6
WC	(United Kingdom) Richard Gabb (United Kingdom) Ashley Hewitt	6^{3}	4
(United Kingdom) J Goodall (United Kingdom) J Murray	6	6
(France) D Guez (France) V Millot	1	3
4	(India) P Raja (India) D Sharan	6	6
(Republic of Ireland) J Cluskey (New Zealand) M Daniell	4	4
WC	(United Kingdom) James Marsalek (United Kingdom) D Walsh	4	2
(Belgium) N Desein (Germany) P Torebko	6	6
(Slovenia) A Bedene (Slovakia) P Červenák	6	3	[10]
(Belgium) M Authom (United States) M Yani	4	6	[8]
(Spain) A Menéndez (Spain) C Poch Gradin	6^{6}	3
3	(United States) J Cerretani (Canada) A Shamasdin	7^{8}	6
WC	(United Kingdom) R Bloomfield (United Kingdom) Harry Meehan	7^{7}	4	[10]
(Italy) T Fabbiano (Republic of Ireland) D Glancy	6^{4}	6	[3]
(Germany) P Gojowczyk (Germany) J-L Struff	4	6^{2}
2	(Sweden) J Brunström (South Africa) R Klaasen	6	7^{7}

Quarterfinals
1	(United Kingdom) J Delgado (United Kingdom) K Skupski	7^{9}	5	[8]
(United Kingdom) J Goodall (United Kingdom) J Murray	6^{7}	7	[10]
4	(India) P Raja (India) D Sharan	6	6
(Belgium) N Desein (Germany) P Torebko	3	3
(Slovenia) A Bedene (Slovakia) P Červenák
3	(United States) J Cerretani (Canada) A Shamasdin	w/o
WC	(United Kingdom) R Bloomfield (United Kingdom) H Meehan	4	1
2	(Sweden) J Brunström (South Africa) R Klaasen	6	6

Semifinals
(United Kingdom) J Goodall (United Kingdom) J Murray	6^{3}	6	[10]
4	(India) P Raja (India) D Sharan	7^{7}	2	[12]
3	(United States) J Cerretani (Canada) A Shamasdin	7^{9}	6^{3}	[10]
2	(Sweden) J Brunström (South Africa) R Klaasen	6^{7}	7^{7}	[8]

Final
4	(India) P Raja (India) D Sharan	4	5
3	(United States) J Cerretani (Canada) A Shamasdin	6	7
