= 2012 Aegon Pro-Series Loughborough – Men's singles =

Men's singles
- 2012 Aegon Pro-Series Loughborough

Final
- Champion: (Russia) Evgeny Donskoy
- Runner-up: (Germany) Jan-Lennard Struff
- Score: 6–2, 4–6, 6–1

Events
Singles	men	women
Doubles	men	women
← 2011 ·	Aegon Pro-Series Loughborough	· 2013 →

Tobias Kamke was the defending champion but was defeated by Evgeny Donskoy in the semifinals.
Donskoy won the title by defeating Jan-Lennard Struff 6–2, 4–6, 6–1 in the final.

== Seeds ==
1. (Germany) Tobias Kamke (semifinals)
2. (Slovenia) Aljaž Bedene (first round)
3. (Israel) Dudi Sela (quarterfinals)
4. (Russia) Evgeny Donskoy (champion)
5. (Belgium) Maxime Authom (quarterfinals)
6. (Germany) Peter Gojowczyk (second round)
7. (France) Adrian Mannarino (semifinals)
8. (Spain) Adrián Menéndez (second round)

== Draw ==
=== Key ===
- Q = Qualifier
- WC = Wild card
- LL = Lucky loser
- Alt = Alternate
- SE = Special exempt
- PR = Protected ranking
- ITF = ITF entry
- JE = Junior exempt
- w/o = Walkover
- r = Retired
- d = Defaulted
- SR = Special ranking

=== Finals ===
Semifinals
1	(Germany) Tobias Kamke	4	1
4	(Russia) Evgeny Donskoy	6	6
7	(France) Adrian Mannarino	6^{1}	0
(Germany) Jan-Lennard Struff	7^{7}	6

Final
4	(Russia) Evgeny Donskoy	6	4	6
(Germany) Jan-Lennard Struff	2	6	1

=== Top half ===
First round
1	(Germany) T Kamke	4
Q	(Sweden) P Rosenholm	0^{r}
(Italy) R Ghedin	6	6
(Belgium) Y Mertens	3	2
(Belgium) N Desein	2	6	4
(Slovakia) P Červenák	6	4	6
(United Kingdom) J Goodall	6	3	6^{4}
5	(Belgium) M Authom	1	6	7^{7}
4	(Russia) E Donskoy	4	6	6
WC	(United Kingdom) James Marsalek	6	4	3
(Italy) T Fabbiano	6^{6}	6	6
(United States) M Yani	7^{8}	4	4
SE	(Switzerland) H Laaksonen	7^{10}	6
(Czech Republic) D Lojda	6^{8}	2
(Germany) B Knittel	6^{4}	3
6	(Germany) P Gojowczyk	7^{7}	6

Second round
1	(Germany) T Kamke	6	3
(Italy) R Ghedin	0	1^{r}
(Slovakia) P Červenák	6	4	5
5	(Belgium) M Authom	4	6	7
4	(Russia) E Donskoy	6	7^{7}
(Italy) T Fabbiano	0	6^{4}
SE	(Switzerland) H Laaksonen	6	6^{5}	6
6	(Germany) P Gojowczyk	4	7^{7}	1

Quarterfinals
1	(Germany) T Kamke	7^{7}	6
5	(Belgium) M Authom	6^{5}	2
4	(Russia) E Donskoy	6	6
SE	(Switzerland) H Laaksonen	1	2

Semifinals
1	(Germany) T Kamke	4	1
4	(Russia) E Donskoy	6	6

=== Bottom half ===
First round
7	(France) A Mannarino	6	6
Q	(United Kingdom) Richard Gabb	1	4
(France) V Millot	6	5
(Kazakhstan) E Korolev	1	3^{r}
WC	(United Kingdom) Ashley Hewitt	7^{7}	6
WC	(United Kingdom) R Bloomfield	6^{3}	3
(Germany) P Torebko	2	2
3	(Israel) D Sela	6	6
8	(Spain) A Menéndez	6	6
Q	(United Kingdom) Myles Orton	3	2
(France) D Guez	2	2
(Germany) J-L Struff	6	6
Q	(United Kingdom) Tom Burn	6	1	2
(United Kingdom) J Baker	3	6	6
WC	(United Kingdom) D Evans	6	6^{3}	6
2	(Slovenia) A Bedene	4	7^{7}	3

Second round
7	(France) A Mannarino	6	6
(France) V Millot	1	1
WC	(United Kingdom) A Hewitt	2	4
3	(Israel) D Sela	6	6
8	(Spain) A Menéndez	6	2	3
(Germany) J-L Struff	3	6	6
(United Kingdom) J Baker	7^{12}	6
WC	(United Kingdom) D Evans	6^{10}	4

Quarterfinals
7	(France) A Mannarino	6	5	6
3	(Israel) D Sela	3	7	2
(Germany) J-L Struff	6	6
(United Kingdom) J Baker	4	1

Semifinals
7	(France) A Mannarino	6^{1}	0
(Germany) J-L Struff	7^{7}	6
