= 2012 Aegon Pro-Series Loughborough =

- Date: 5–11 November
- Edition: 3rd
- Surface: Hard (indoor)
- Location: Loughborough, United Kingdom

Champions

Men's singles
- (Russia) Evgeny Donskoy

Women's singles
- (Czech Republic) Renata Voráčová

Men's doubles
- (United States) James Cerretani / (Canada) Adil Shamasdin

Women's doubles
- (United Kingdom) Anna Fitzpatrick / (United Kingdom) Jade Windley
- Aegon Pro-Series Loughborough

The 2012 Aegon Pro-Series Loughborough was a professional tennis tournament played on indoor hard courts. It was the third edition of the tournament which was part of the 2012 ATP Challenger Tour and 2012 ITF Women's Circuit. It took place in Loughborough, United Kingdom, on 5–11 November 2012.

== Men's singles main-draw entrants ==
=== Seeds ===
Country	Player	Rank^{1}	Seed
GER	Tobias Kamke	78	1
SVN	Aljaž Bedene	92	2
ISR	Dudi Sela	101	3
RUS	Evgeny Donskoy	127	4
BEL	Maxime Authom	160	5
GER	Peter Gojowczyk	170	6
FRA	Adrian Mannarino	180	7
ESP	Adrián Menéndez	189	8

- ^{1} Rankings are as of October 29, 2012.

=== Other entrants ===
The following players received wildcards into the singles main draw:

- (United Kingdom) Richard Bloomfield
- (United Kingdom) Dan Evans
- (United Kingdom) Ashley Hewitt
- (United Kingdom) James Marsalek

The following players received entry as a special exempt into the singles main draw:

- (Switzerland) Henri Laaksonen

The following players received entry from the qualifying draw:

- (United Kingdom) Tom Burn
- (United Kingdom) Richard Gabb
- (United Kingdom) Myles Orton
- (Sweden) Patrik Rosenholm

== Champions ==
=== Men's singles ===
- (Russia) Evgeny Donskoy def. (Germany) Jan-Lennard Struff, 6–2, 4–6, 6–1

=== Women's singles ===
- (Czech Republic) Renata Voráčová def. (Germany) Julia Kimmelmann, 7–5, 6–7^{(6–8)}, 6–3

=== Men's doubles ===
- (United States) James Cerretani / (Canada) Adil Shamasdin def. (India) Purav Raja / (India) Divij Sharan, 6–4, 7–5.

=== Women's doubles ===
- (United Kingdom) Anna Fitzpatrick / (United Kingdom) Jade Windley def. (Denmark) Karen Barbat / (Switzerland) Lara Michel, 6–2, 6–2.
