= 2011 Aegon Pro-Series Loughborough – Men's doubles =

Men's doubles
- 2011 Aegon Pro-Series Loughborough

Final
- Champions: (United Kingdom) Jamie Delgado (United Kingdom) Jonathan Marray
- Runners-up: (Republic of Ireland) Sam Barry (Republic of Ireland) Daniel Glancy
- Score: 6–2, 6–2

Events
Singles	men	women
Doubles	men	women
← 2010 ·	Aegon Pro-Series Loughborough	· 2012 →

Henri Kontinen and Frederik Nielsen were the defending champions but decided not to participate.
Jamie Delgado and Jonathan Marray won the title, defeating Sam Barry and Daniel Glancy 6–2, 6–2 in the final.

== Seeds ==
1. (United Kingdom) Jamie Delgado / (United Kingdom) Jonathan Marray (champions)
2. (Germany) Andre Begemann / (Germany) Frank Moser (first round)
3. (United Kingdom) David Rice / (United Kingdom) Sean Thornley (semifinals)
4. (Republic of Ireland) James Cluskey / (France) Fabrice Martin (first round)

== Draw ==
=== Key ===
- Q = Qualifier
- WC = Wild card
- LL = Lucky loser
- Alt = Alternate
- SE = Special exempt
- PR = Protected ranking
- ITF = ITF entry
- JE = Junior exempt
- w/o = Walkover
- r = Retired
- d = Defaulted
- SR = Special ranking

=== Draw ===
First round
1	(United Kingdom) J Delgado (United Kingdom) J Marray	6	6
WC	(United Kingdom) Miles Bugby (United Kingdom) Andrew Fitzpatrick	4	3
(Slovenia) A Bedene (Slovenia) G Žemlja	7^{11}	6
(United Kingdom) J Goodall (United Kingdom) M Willis	6^{9}	4
3	(United Kingdom) D Rice (United Kingdom) S Thornley	6	6
(Belgium) M Authom (Belgium) Y Mertens	3	2
(Slovakia) I Klec (Estonia) J Zopp	7	6
WC	(United Kingdom) O Golding (United Kingdom) D Smethurst	5	3
Alt	(Republic of Ireland) S Barry (Republic of Ireland) D Glancy	7	3	[10]
(Germany) P Gojowczyk (Germany) P Torebko	5	6	[5]
(United Kingdom) D Cox (Finland) T Nieminen	5	6	[10]
4	(Republic of Ireland) J Cluskey (France) F Martin	7	2	[7]
(Italy) Fabio Colangelo (Italy) M Crugnola	6	6
(United Kingdom) J Milton (United Kingdom) A Ward	3	2
WC	(United Kingdom) Connor Glennon (United Kingdom) Scott Whitbread	6	6
2	(Germany) A Begemann (Germany) F Moser	2	1

Quarterfinals
1	(United Kingdom) J Delgado (United Kingdom) J Marray	6	6
(Slovenia) A Bedene (Slovenia) G Žemlja	3	2
3	(United Kingdom) D Rice (United Kingdom) S Thornley	6	6
(Slovakia) I Klec (Estonia) J Zopp	1	2
Alt	(Republic of Ireland) S Barry (Republic of Ireland) D Glancy	6	6
(United Kingdom) D Cox (Finland) T Nieminen	1	2
(Italy) F Colangelo (Italy) M Crugnola	1	2
WC	(United Kingdom) C Glennon (United Kingdom) S Whitbread	6	6

Semifinals
1	(United Kingdom) J Delgado (United Kingdom) J Marray	6	6
3	(United Kingdom) D Rice (United Kingdom) S Thornley	2	3
Alt	(Republic of Ireland) S Barry (Republic of Ireland) D Glancy	7	7^{7}
WC	(United Kingdom) C Glennon (United Kingdom) S Whitbread	5	6^{4}

Final
1	(United Kingdom) J Delgado (United Kingdom) J Marray	6	6
Alt	(Republic of Ireland) S Barry (Republic of Ireland) D Glancy	2	2
