= Shérazad Reix =

French tennis player

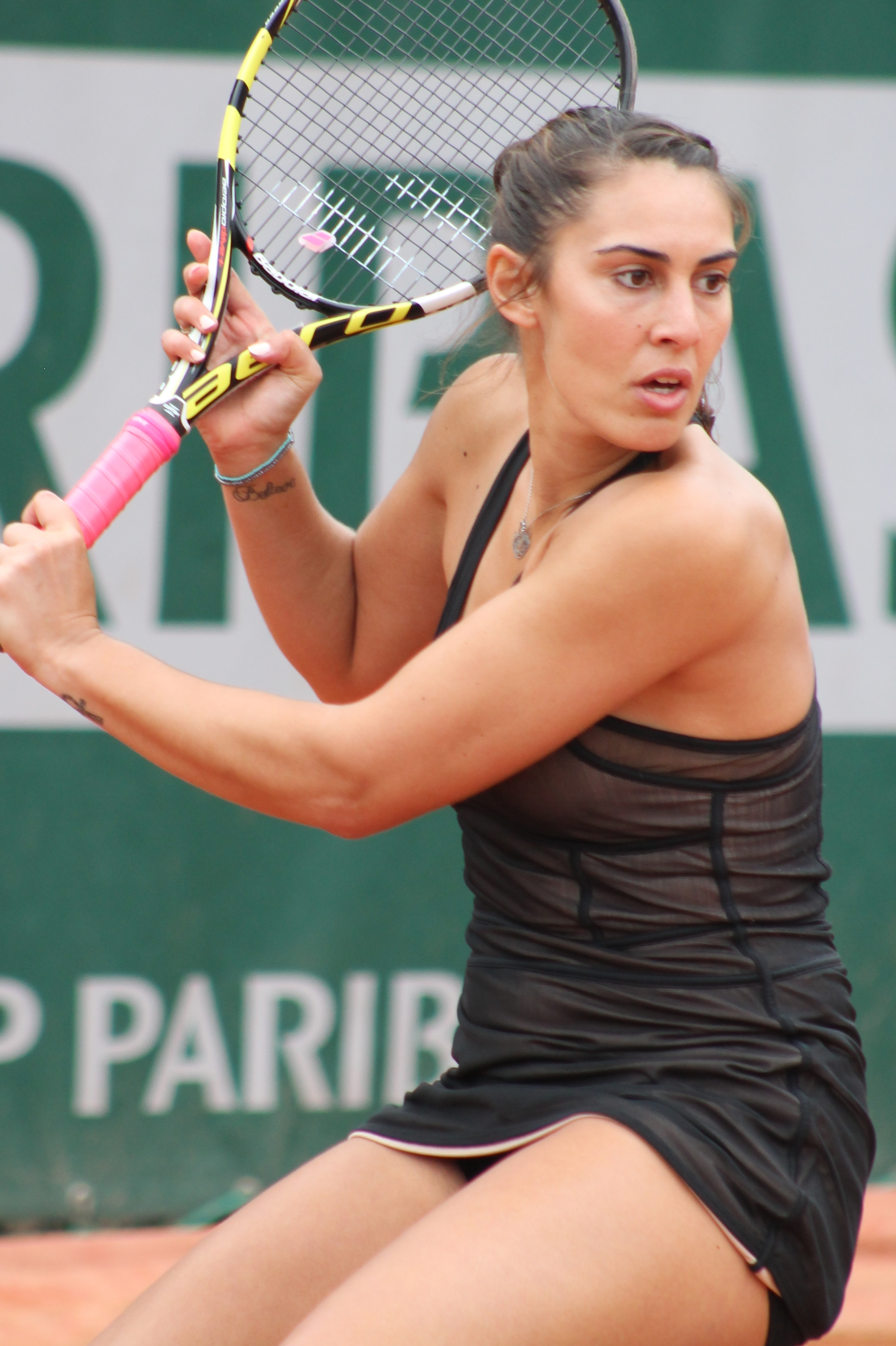
- Country (sports): France
- Born: 3 April 1989 (age 37)
- Retired: 2019
- Plays: Left (one-handed backhand)
- Prize money: $183,746

Singles
- Career record: 301–225
- Career titles: 7 ITF
- Highest ranking: No. 204 (11 July 2016)

Grand Slam singles results
- French Open: Q1 (2016)
- Wimbledon: Q2 (2016)
- US Open: Q1 (2016)

Doubles
- Career record: 117–125
- Career titles: 10 ITF
- Highest ranking: No. 219 (10 April 2017)

Grand Slam doubles results
- French Open: 1R (2015)

Shérazad Reix (née Benamar; born 3 April 1989) is a French former tennis player. She has career-high WTA rankings of 204 in singles and 219 in doubles. In her career, she won seven singles and ten doubles titles on the ITF Circuit.

== Career ==
In May 2015, Reix and her women's doubles partner Clothilde de Bernardi received a wildcard to play in the main draw of the 2015 French Open but they lost in the first round.

In 2023, Reix was banned from professional tennis for four years and fined $30,000 after being found guilty of six match fixing offences by the International Tennis Integrity Agency.

== Personal life ==
Reix was born in France and is of Algerian descent. She is married to French player Clément Reix.

== ITF Circuit finals ==
=== Singles: 20 (7 titles, 13 runner–ups) ===
Legend $80,000 tournaments $50,000 tournaments $25,000 tournaments $10/15,000 tournaments	Finals by surface Hard (4–6) Clay (3–4) Grass (0–1) Carpet (0–2)

Result	W–L	Date	Tournament	Tier	Surface	Opponent	Score
Loss	0–1	Nov 2008	ITF Le Havre, France	10,000	Clay (i)	(France) Samantha Schoeffel	6–7^{(4)}, 6–7^{(6)}
Loss	0–2	Jan 2013	ITF Fort-de-France, France	10,000	Hard	(Canada) Sonja Molnar	2–6, 0–6
Win	1–2	Sep 2013	ITF Algiers, Algeria	10,000	Clay	(India) Shweta Rana	6–1, 3–6, 6–1
Win	2–2	Sep 2013	ITF Antalya, Turkey	10,000	Clay	(Germany) Lena-Marie Hofmann	6–7^{(1)}, 6–1, 3–0 ret.
Loss	2–3	Jan 2014	ITF Fort-de-France, France	10,000	Hard	(France) Irina Ramialison	4–6, 2–6
Win	3–3	Jan 2014	ITF Petit-Bourg, France	10,000	Hard	(Canada) Khristina Blajkevitch	3–6, 6–3, 6–1
Loss	3–4	Sep 2014	ITF Algiers, Algeria	15,000	Clay	(Switzerland) Conny Perrin	1–6, 1–6
Win	4–4	Oct 2014	ITF Antalya, Turkey	10,000	Hard	(Czech Republic) Kateřina Vaňková	6–4, 6–4
Loss	4–5	Oct 2014	ITF Antalya, Turkey	10,000	Hard	(Czech Republic) Jesika Malečková	3–6, 3–6
Loss	4–6	Nov 2014	GB Pro-Series Loughborough, UK	10,000	Hard (i)	(Republic of Ireland) Amy Bowtell	7–6^{(6)}, 1–6, 6–7^{(3)}
Loss	4–7	Nov 2014	ITF Sousse, Tunisia	10,000	Hard	(Russia) Natela Dzalamidze	6–7^{(7)}, 1–6
Win	5–7	Feb 2015	ITF Petit-Bourg, France	10,000	Hard	(United States) Nicole Frenkel	6–1, 6–3
Loss	5–8	Jul 2015	ITF Imola, Italy	25,000	Carpet	(United States) Bernarda Pera	2–6, 3–6
Win	6–8	Jul 2015	ITF Les Contamines, France	10,000	Hard	(France) Théo Gravouil	7–6^{(2)}, 6–0
Loss	6–9	Jul 2015	ITF Horb, Germany	15,000	Clay	(Czech Republic) Jesika Malečková	6–1, 4–6, 2–6
Loss	6–10	Sep 2015	ITF Redding, United States	25,000	Hard	(Canada) Heidi El Tabakh	1–6, 3–6
Win	7–10	Mar 2017	ITF Mornington, Australia	25,000	Clay	(Czech Republic) Barbora Krejčíková	7–6^{(3)}, 6–4
Loss	7–11	Jun 2017	Open de Montpellier, France	25,000	Clay	(Romania) Alexandra Dulgheru	2–6, 2–6
Loss	7–12	Mar 2018	ITF Mildura, Australia	25,000	Grass	(United Kingdom) Gabriella Taylor	0–6, 3–6
Loss	7–13	Jul 2018	ITF Imola, Italy	25,000	Carpet	(Italy) Stefania Rubini	0–2 ret.

=== Doubles: 22 (10–12) ===
Legend $60,000 tournaments $25,000 tournaments $10/15,000 tournaments	Finals by surface Hard (8–4) Clay (1–7) Grass (0–1)

Outcome	No.	Date	Tournament	Surface	Partner	Opponents	Score
Runner-up	1.	18 September 2006	ITF Limoges, France	Hard (i)	(France) Chloé Gambey	(Netherlands) Kika Hogendoorn (France) Anaïs Laurendon	2–6, 4–6
Winner	1.	27 January 2007	ITF Grenoble, France	Hard (i)	(France) Julie Coin	(France) Stéphanie Rizzi (Poland) Karolina Kosińska	1–6, 7–5, 6–4
Runner-up	2.	22 June 2008	Open de Montpellier, France	Clay	(France) Charlotte Rodier	(China) Lu Jingjing (Argentina) Veronica Spiegel	5–7, 7–6^{(5)}, [7–10]
Runner-up	3.	15 March 2010	ITF Amiens, France	Clay (i)	(France) Alizé Lim	(Israel) Efrat Mishor (Bosnia and Herzegovina) Jasmina Tinjić	6–7^{(5)}, 7–5, [5–10]
Winner	2.	9 January 2012	ITF Saint Martin, Guadeloupe	Hard	(France) Brandy Mina	(France) Marion Gaud (France) Amandine Hesse	6–4, 6–4
Runner-up	4.	25 March 2012	ITF Gonesse, France	Clay (i)	(France) Brandy Mina	(Slovakia) Karin Morgošová (Slovakia) Lenka Tvarošková	6–7^{(4)}, 1–6
Runner-up	5.	6 January 2013	ITF Fort-de-France, Martinique	Hard	(France) Brandy Mina	(United States) Denise Starr (Netherlands) Indy de Vroome	4–6, 3–6
Winner	3.	25 February 2013	ITF Bron, France	Hard (i)	(France) Pauline Payet	(Russia) Daria Salnikova (Russia) Alina Silich	7–5, 7–5
Winner	4.	16 September 2013	ITF Algiers, Algeria	Clay	(France) Amandine Cazeaux	(India) Shivika Burman (India) Shweta Rana	6–0, 6–3
Winner	5.	2 November 2014	GB Pro-Series Loughborough, UK	Hard (i)	(Czech Republic) Martina Borecká	(Republic of Ireland) Amy Bowtell (United Kingdom) Lucy Brown	6–3, 6–2
Winner	6.	12 January 2015	ITF Fort-de-France, Martinique	Hard	(Chile) Alexa Guarachi	(Canada) Rosie Johanson (Canada) Gloria Liang	6–2, 6–1
Winner	7.	20 July 2015	ITF Les Contamines, France	Hard	(Slovakia) Michaela Hončová	(Italy) Georgia Brescia (Netherlands) Erika Vogelsang	6–3, 6–4
Runner-up	6.	3 August 2015	ITF Koksijde, Belgium	Clay	(Poland) Justyna Jegiołka	(Belgium) Elise Mertens (Netherlands) Demi Schuurs	3–6, 2–6
Runner-up	7.	24 August 2015	ITF Bagnatica, Italy	Clay	(Italy) Alice Balducci	(Italy) Anastasia Grymalska (Belarus) Ilona Kremen	4–6, 2–6
Runner-up	8.	9 November 2015	ITF Équeurdreville, France	Hard (i)	(Ukraine) Elizaveta Ianchuk	(Romania) Alexandra Cadanțu (Netherlands) Lesley Kerkhove	3–6, 4–6
Winner	8.	3 July 2016	ITF Denain, France	Clay	(France) Michaela Hončová	(United Kingdom) Amanda Carreras (Italy) Alice Savoretti	6–1, 6–3
Runner-up	9.	10 March 2017	ITF Mildura, Australia	Grass	(France) Tessah Andrianjafitrimo	(Thailand) Noppawan Lertcheewakarn (China) Lu Jiajing	4–6, 6–1, [8–10]
Runner-up	10.	30 June 2017	ITF Périgueux, France	Clay	(France) Manon Arcangioli	(Italy) Camilla Rosatello (Belgium) Kimberley Zimmermann	4–6, 3–6
Winner	9.	14 October 2017	ITF Cherbourg-en-Cotentin, France	Hard (i)	(France) Manon Arcangioli	(United Kingdom) Samantha Murray (India) Karman Thandi	3–1 ret.
Winner	10.	5 November 2017	Open Nantes Atlantique, France	Hard (i)	(France) Manon Arcangioli	(Netherlands) Lesley Kerkhove (Netherlands) Michaëlla Krajicek	6–2, 6–3
Runner-up	11.	18 May 2018	Open Saint-Gaudens, France	Clay	(France) Manon Arcangioli	(Australia) Naiktha Bains (United States) Francesca Di Lorenzo	4–6, 6–1, [9–11]
Runner-up	12.	28 September 2018	ITF Clermont-Ferrand, France	Hard (i)	(France) Manon Arcangioli	(Switzerland) Leonie Küng (Bulgaria) Isabella Shinikova	2–6, 5–7
