= 2011 Aegon Pro-Series Loughborough – Men's singles =

Men's singles
- 2011 Aegon Pro-Series Loughborough

Final
- Champion: (Germany) Tobias Kamke
- Runner-up: (Italy) Flavio Cipolla
- Score: 6–2, 7–5

Events
Singles	men	women
Doubles	men	women
- Aegon Pro-Series Loughborough

Matthias Bachinger was the defending champion but decided not to participate.

Tobias Kamke won the title defeating Flavio Cipolla in the final 6–2, 7–5.

== Seeds ==
1. (Italy) Flavio Cipolla (final)
2. (Germany) Tobias Kamke (champion)
3. (Germany) Andreas Beck (quarterfinals)
4. (Japan) Go Soeda (quarterfinals)
5. (Slovenia) Grega Žemlja (second round)
6. (Austria) Andreas Haider-Maurer (quarterfinals)
7. (Estonia) Jürgen Zopp (first round)
8. (United Kingdom) James Ward (first round)

== Draw ==
Key

- Q = Qualifier
- WC = Wild card
- LL = Lucky loser
- Alt = Alternate
- ITF = ITF entry
- PR = Protected ranking
- SR = Special ranking
- SE = Special exempt
- JE = Junior exempt
- JR = Junior Accelerator Programme entrant
- CO = College Accelerator Programme entrant
- NG = Next Gen Accelerator Program entrant
- w/o = Walkover
- r = Retired
- d = Defaulted

=== Finals ===
Semifinals
1	(Italy) Flavio Cipolla	4	6	6
(Slovenia) Aljaž Bedene	6	3	4
(Germany) Peter Torebko	1	3
2	(Germany) Tobias Kamke	6	6

Final
1	(Italy) Flavio Cipolla	2	5
2	(Germany) Tobias Kamke	6	7

=== Top half ===
First round
1	(Italy) F Cipolla	6	6
WC	(United Kingdom) A Ward	2	2
(Italy) M Crugnola	5	3
(Italy) S Vagnozzi	7	6
Q	(United Kingdom) D Cox	4	3
(Germany) P Gojowczyk	6	6
Q	(United Kingdom) D Smethurst	4	2
6	(Austria) A Haider-Maurer	6	6
3	(Germany) A Beck	6	6
WC	(United Kingdom) J Goodall	3	4
(Belgium) M Authom	6	5	6
(Moldova) R Albot	4	7	3
(Slovenia) A Bedene	6	6
(Slovakia) I Klec	3	1
WC	(United Kingdom) D Evans	7^{7}	6
7	(Estonia) J Zopp	6^{1}	3

Second round
1	(Italy) F Cipolla	3	6	6
(Italy) S Vagnozzi	6	3	4
(Germany) P Gojowczyk	6^{5}	6	6^{7}
6	(Austria) A Haider-Maurer	7^{7}	2	7^{9}
3	(Germany) A Beck	6	6
(Belgium) M Authom	3	4
(Slovenia) A Bedene	7^{7}	6
WC	(United Kingdom) D Evans	6^{4}	1

Quarterfinals
1	(Italy) F Cipolla	6	2	7
6	(Austria) A Haider-Maurer	4	6	5
3	(Germany) A Beck	2	4
(Slovenia) A Bedene	6	6

Semifinals
1	(Italy) F Cipolla	4	6	6
(Slovenia) A Bedene	6	3	4

=== Bottom half ===
First round
8	(United Kingdom) J Ward	3	6	3
(Germany) P Torebko	6	2	6
WC	(United Kingdom) O Golding	6	6
(Italy) M Marrai	3	4
Q	(United Kingdom) J Milton	6	3	2
(Belgium) Y Mertens	4	6	6
(Czech Republic) D Lojda	6^{9}	4
4	(Japan) G Soeda	7^{11}	6
5	(Slovenia) G Žemlja	6	6
(Germany) J Reister	4	3
Q	(Finland) T Nieminen	3	7	2
(Germany) A Begemann	6	5	6
(Republic of Ireland) C Niland	6	7
(Italy) A Arnaboldi	3	5
(France) F Martin	0	2
2	(Germany) T Kamke	6	6

Second round
(Germany) P Torebko	6	6
WC	(United Kingdom) O Golding	1	1
(Belgium) Y Mertens	6^{2}	2
4	(Japan) G Soeda	7^{7}	6
5	(Slovenia) G Žemlja	6^{6}	4
(Germany) A Begemann	7^{8}	6
(Republic of Ireland) C Niland	6	0	0
2	(Germany) T Kamke	3	6	6

Quarterfinals
(Germany) P Torebko	0	7^{10}	6
4	(Japan) G Soeda	6	6^{8}	2
(Germany) A Begemann	4	6	3
2	(Germany) T Kamke	6	3	6

Semifinals
(Germany) P Torebko	1	3
2	(Germany) T Kamke	6	6
