= 2010 Aegon Pro-Series Loughborough =

- Date: 8–14 November
- Edition: 1st
- Surface: Hard
- Location: Loughborough, Great Britain

Champions

Men's singles
- (Germany) Matthias Bachinger

Women's singles
- (Switzerland) Lara Michel

Men's doubles
- (Finland) Henri Kontinen / (Denmark) Frederik Nielsen

Women's doubles
- (United Kingdom) Jocelyn Rae / (United Kingdom) Jade Windley
| Aegon Pro-Series Loughborough | · 2011 → |

The 2010 Aegon Pro-Series Loughborough was a professional tennis tournament played on indoor hard courts. It was the first edition of the tournament which is part of the 2010 ATP Challenger Tour. It took place in Loughborough, Great Britain between 8 and 14 November 2010.

== ATP singles main-draw entrants ==
=== Seeds ===
| Country | Player | Rank^{1} | Seed |
|---|---|---|---|
| GER | Björn Phau | 95 | 1 |
| FRA | Adrian Mannarino | 97 | 2 |
| AUT | Andreas Haider-Maurer | 115 | 3 |
| FRA | David Guez | 144 | 4 |
| IRL | Conor Niland | 156 | 5 |
| AUS | Matthew Ebden | 168 | 6 |
| ITA | Simone Vagnozzi | 178 | 7 |
| SUI | Michael Lammer | 204 | 8 |

- Rankings are as of November 1, 2010.

=== Other entrants ===
The following players received wildcards into the singles main draw:

- (United Kingdom) Jamie Baker
- (United Kingdom) Daniel Cox
- (United Kingdom) Daniel Evans
- (United Kingdom) Joshua Milton

The following players received entry from the qualifying draw:

- (Austria) Max Raditschnigg
- (United Kingdom) Sean Thornley
- (Switzerland) Roman Valent
- (United Kingdom) Marcus Willis

== Champions ==
=== Men's singles ===
(Germany) Matthias Bachinger def. (Denmark) Frederik Nielsen, 6–3, 3–6, 6–1

=== Women's singles ===
(Switzerland) Lara Michel def. (United Kingdom) Anna Fitzpatrick, 6–2, 6–2

=== Men's doubles ===
(Finland) Henri Kontinen / (Denmark) Frederik Nielsen def. (Australia) Jordan Kerr / (United Kingdom) Ken Skupski, 6–2, 6–4

=== Women's doubles ===
(United Kingdom) Jocelyn Rae / (United Kingdom) Jade Windley def. (Czech Republic) Jana Jandová / (Czech Republic) Petra Krejsová, 6–3, 5–7, [10–4]
