= Daniel Glancy =

Irish tennis player

- Country (sports): Ireland
- Residence: Dublin, Ireland
- Born: 13 November 1988 (age 37) Castlebar, County Mayo, Ireland
- Height: 5 ft 11 in (1.80 m)
- Turned pro: 2009
- Retired: 2016
- Plays: Right-handed (two-handed backhand)
- Prize money: $37,301

Singles
- Career record: 1–5
- Career titles: 0; 0 Challenger, 0 Futures
- Highest ranking: No. 718 (14 October 2013)

Doubles
- Career record: 0–0
- Career titles: 0; 0 Challenger, 7 Futures
- Highest ranking: No. 352 (5 December 2011)

Team competitions
- Davis Cup: 1–5
- Last updated on: 17 January 2019.

Daniel Glancy (born 13 November 1988) is a former Irish professional tennis player. He was born and raised in County Mayo, Ireland.

== Career ==
Glancy has spent most of his career on the Futures Circuit where he has won seven doubles titles. He made history in April 2013 when he became the first player from Connacht to represent the Irish Davis Cup team. He defeated Micke Kontinen of Finland in his debut Davis Cup match and holds a 1–3 record in the competition. He retired from professional tennis in 2016 because of his chronic hip injury.

== Future and Challenger finals ==
=== Doubles 18 (7–11) ===
Legend (doubles) ATP Challenger Tour (0–1) ITF Futures Tour (7–10)	Titles by surface Hard (1–7) Clay (5–4) Grass (0–0) Carpet (1–0)

Result	W–L	Date	Tournament	Tier	Surface	Partner	Opponents	Score
Win	1–0	Oct 2010	Greece F3, Heraklion	Futures	Carpet	(United Kingdom) Marcus Willis	(Republic of Ireland) Sam Barry (Republic of Ireland) Colin O'Brien	7–5, 5–7, [10–8]
Loss	1–1	Mar 2011	Portugal F3, Albufeira	Futures	Hard	(Republic of Ireland) Sam Barry	(Spain) Agustín Boje-Ordóñez (United Kingdom) Morgan Phillips	3–6, 6–7^{(4–7)}
Loss	1–2	Apr 2011	France F6, Angers	Futures	Clay (i)	(New Zealand) Sebastian Lavie	(France) Grégoire Burquier (France) Romain Jouan	3–6, 2–6
Loss	1–3	May 2011	Turkey F19, Antalya	Futures	Hard	(Republic of Ireland) Barry King	(Moldova) Andrei Ciumac (Ukraine) Denys Molchanov	5–7, 6–7^{(4–7)}
Win	2–3	Aug 2011	Finland F3, Nastola	Futures	Clay	(Republic of Ireland) Sam Barry	(Finland) Herkko Pöllänen (Finland) Max Wennakoski	6–4, 6–2
Loss	2–4	Sep 2011	Great Britain F13, Wrexham	Futures	Hard	(United Kingdom) James Feaver	(United Kingdom) David Rice (United Kingdom) Sean Thornley	2–6, 5–7
Loss	2–5	Nov 2011	Loughborough, Great Britain	Challenger	Hard (i)	(Republic of Ireland) Sam Barry	(United Kingdom) Jamie Delgado (United Kingdom) Jonathan Marray	2–6, 2–6
Win	3–5	May 2012	Turkey F20, Mersin	Futures	Clay	(United Kingdom) James Feaver	(Australia) Maverick Banes (New Zealand) Sebastian Lavie	7–6^{(7–5)}, 6–3
Loss	3–6	Jun 2012	Turkey F22, Konya	Futures	Hard	(United States) William Boe-Wiegaard	(Ukraine) Oleksandr Nedovyesov (Ukraine) Ivan Sergeyev	6–7^{(5–7)}, 1–6
Win	4–6	Aug 2012	Belgium F8, Koksijde	Futures	Clay	(Mexico) Manuel Sánchez	(Belgium) Joris De Loore (United Kingdom) Oliver Golding	3–6, 6–2, [10–8]
Loss	4–7	Aug 2012	Netherlands F5, Enschede	Futures	Clay	(Republic of Ireland) Sam Barry	(Netherlands Antilles) Alexander Blom (Netherlands) Kevin Griekspoor	3–6, 6–7^{(8–10)}
Loss	4–8	Sep 2012	Great Britain F16, Nottingham	Futures	Clay	(United Kingdom) Miles Bugby	(United Kingdom) Edward Corrie (United Kingdom) James Marsalek	7–5, 3–6, [7–10]
Win	5–8	Dec 2012	Morocco F10, Oujda	Futures	Clay	(Hungary) Márton Fucsovics	(Italy) Riccardo Bellotti (Austria) Dominic Thiem	6–2, 6–3
Loss	5–9	May 2013	Israel F9, Ramat HaSharon	Futures	Clay	(Republic of Ireland) Sam Barry	(Japan) Takuto Niki (Japan) Arata Onozawa	3–6, 4–6
Loss	5–10	Jun 2013	Portugal F8, Guimarães	Futures	Hard	(Italy) Riccardo Ghedin	(Spain) Carlos Boluda-Purkiss (Spain) Roberto Ortega Olmedo	2–6, 3–6
Win	6–10	Jun 2015	Bulgaria F3, Blagoevgrad	Futures	Clay	(Germany) Pirmin Haenle	(Greece) Ioannis Stergiou (Greece) Eleftherios Theodorou	6–3, 6–2
Loss	6–11	Aug 2015	Turkey F30, Erzurum	Futures	Hard	(Russia) Alexander Igoshin	(Turkey) Tuna Altuna (Australia) Bradley Mousley	5–7, 4–6
Win	7–11	Aug 2015	Turkey F31, Istanbul	Futures	Hard	(Russia) Alexander Igoshin	(Turkey) Sarp Ağabigün (Turkey) Muhammet Haylaz	6–4, 6–3
