= Sam Barry (tennis) =

Irish professional tennis player (born 1992)

- Country (sports): Ireland
- Residence: Limerick, Ireland
- Born: 27 January 1992 (age 34) Limerick, Ireland
- Height: 1.88 m (6 ft 2 in)
- Turned pro: 2011
- Plays: Right-handed (two-handed backhand)
- Prize money: $121,012

Singles
- Career record: 2–7
- Career titles: 0
- Highest ranking: No. 255 (28 November 2016)

Grand Slam singles results
- Australian Open Junior: 2R (2010)
- French Open Junior: 1R (2010)
- Wimbledon Junior: Q1 (2009, 2010)
- US Open Junior: 2R (2010)

Doubles
- Career record: 3–2
- Career titles: 0
- Highest ranking: No. 221 (10 August 2015)

Grand Slam doubles results
- Australian Open Junior: 2R (2010)
- French Open Junior: 1R (2010)
- Wimbledon Junior: 2R (2010)
- US Open Junior: 2R (2010)

Sam Barry (born 27 January 1992) is an Irish professional tennis player. He was born and raised in Limerick, Ireland.

== Career ==
=== Juniors ===
In 2008, Barry won the under-18 boy's title at the National Junior Tennis Championships and the ITF U-18 boys' singles title in Tallinn, Estonia. This was his first ITF under-18 title following defeats in the finals of similar events in Qatar and Turkmenistan the previous year. Barry had a strong finish to 2008, winning both the Semen Gresik Widjojo Soejono Junior Championships in Surabaya and the Solo Open International Junior Championships in Java in November. The following year, Barry was successful at the Torneig ITF Andorra La Vella, defeating Andrés Artuñedo in the final. Throughout 2010, he competed in the Boys Singles at the Australian Open, French Open and US Open. His 2nd round defeat to Damir Džumhur at the U.S. Open was to be his last match in the under-18 category. As a junior player, Barry reached a career-high ranking of 60th in the world U-18 boys' singles.

=== Professional ===
He turned professional in October 2010 and immediately reached the quarter-final of his first tournament, the F29 Futures in Naples. Barry continued to show promise in 2010 with notable wins over Jiri Kosler in the Thalassa Cup, and followed this up in 2011 with the strongest performance on his senior career in the Thailand F2 Futures, reaching the semi-finals and defeating Joshua Milton along the way.

Barry initially chose to focus on doubles. He has won 9 doubles tournaments on the Futures circuit and finished runner-up in 14 others, as well as reaching the final of the 2011 Aegon Pro-Series Loughborough tournament on the ATP Challenger Tour in November 2011 with Daniel Glancy, losing to the top 100 ranked British duo of Jamie Delgado and Jonathan Marray. Barry usually partners compatriots Glancy, James Cluskey and Colin O'Brien in tournaments.

From 2012 onwards, Barry's energies were more focussed on the singles game, and he reached the singles main draw of a challenger for the first time in September 2013 at the ATP Roller Open, where he lost in the first round to former top-20 player Paul-Henri Mathieu. He completed the year with victory in his first Futures final in December, defeating Liam Broady to claim the Qatar F3 Futures title in Doha.

In March 2014, Barry reached the final of the Great Britain F8 Futures, however he finished runner-up to Marcus Willis. This propelled him to a career-high ranking of 392 on 23 March 2014. He followed this up on 11 May with victory over Adrien Bossel at the Israel F5 Futures in Ashkelon, reaching the final without dropping a set. Barry then went on an impressive run in doubles, winning three consecutive tournaments. He then picked up his second futures title of the year, winning another Israeli futures event, this time in Herzliya.

His subsequent rise up the rankings enabled him to gain direct acceptance to challenger level tournaments and he competed at the OEC Kaohsiung but was defeated in his first round match.

Barry reached his highest ranking of 280th in the world and became Irish no.1 on 15 May 2015 after reaching the final of the Bangkok Challenger.

=== Davis Cup ===
Barry has played ten rubbers for the Ireland Davis Cup team, winning five and losing five. He pulled off an impressive win over 2010 Wimbledon junior champion Márton Fucsovics in a tie against Hungary in February 2012. This win did come in a dead rubber, however, with Ireland 3–1 down at the time.

== Singles titles ==
Legend (singles)
Grand Slam (0)
ATP World Tour Masters 1000 (0)
ATP World Tour 500 (0)
ATP World Tour 250 (0)
ATP Challenger Tour (0)
ITF Futures (6)

Wins (6)

Date	Category	Tournament	Surface	Opponent	Score
8 December 2013	Futures	Doha, F3	Hard	(United Kingdom) Liam Broady	7–6^{(7–2)}, 6–4
11 May 2014	Futures	Ashkelon, F5	Clay	(Switzerland) Adrien Bossel	4–6, 6–1, 6–2
14 June 2014	Futures	Herzlia, F8	Hard	(United States) Peter Kobelt	6–4, 7–6^{(7–5)}
31 August 2014	Futures	Libreville, F2	Hard	(South Africa) Ruan Roelofse	6–3, 7–5
29 November 2015	Futures	Tel Aviv, F16	Hard	(Israel) Amir Weintraub	6–3, 6–4
14 February 2016	Futures	Surbiton, F2	Hard(i)	(France) Maxime Teixeira	4–6, 6–3, 7–6^{(7–3)}

Runner-up (6)

Date	Category	Tournament	Surface	Opponent	Score
16 March 2014	Futures	Manchester, F8	Hard	(United Kingdom) Marcus Willis	6–7^{(4–7)}, 4–6
24 August 2014	Futures	Libreville, F1	Hard	(France) Arthur Surreaux	7–5, 6–7^{(3–7)}, 1–6
19 October 2014	Futures	Ponta Delgada, F10	Hard	(Portugal) Frederico Ferreira Silva	4–6, 3–6
16 August 2015	Futures	Hyvinkää, F2	Clay	(Chile) Gonzalo Lama	2–6, 3–6
6 December 2015	Futures	Tel Aviv, F16	Hard	(United States) Peter Kobelt	6–2, 3–6, 4–6
22 May 2016	Challenger	Bangkok, Thailand	Hard	(Australia) James Duckworth	6–7^{(5–7)}, 4–6

== Doubles titles ==
Legend (doubles)
Grand Slam (0)
ATP World Tour Masters 1000 (0)
ATP World Tour 500 (0)
ATP World Tour 250 (0)
ATP Challenger Tour (0)
ITF Futures (14)

Wins (14)

Date	Category	Tournament	Surface	Partner	Opponent	Score
5 November 2010	Futures	Heraklion, F4	Hard	(Latvia) Miķelis Lībietis	(Slovenia) Rok Jarc (Slovenia) Tom Kočevar-Dešman	7–6^{(8–6)}, 6–7^{(4–7)}, [11–9]
15 May 2011	Futures	Samsun, F17	Hard	(Republic of Ireland) Barry King	(Syria) Issam Al Taweel (Egypt) Mohamed Safwat	6–2, 6–2
27 August 2011	Futures	Nastola, F3	Clay	(Republic of Ireland) Daniel Glancy	(Finland) Herkko Pöllänen (Finland) Max Wennakoski	6–4, 6–2
19 March 2012	Futures	Fujairah, F1	Hard	(United Kingdom) James Marsalek	(Germany) Alexander Satschko (Russia) Mikhail Vasiliev	6–4, 7–6^{(7–4)}
26 March 2012	Futures	Manama, F1	Hard	(Republic of Ireland) James McGee	(Germany) Jeremy Jahn (United Kingdom) Matthew Short	7–5, 4–6, [10–8]
11 March 2013	Futures	Guimarães, F4	Hard	(Republic of Ireland) Colin O'Brien	(Portugal) Goncalo Pereira (Portugal) Danyal Sualehe	6–1, 6–1
29 April 2013	Futures	Ashkelon, F8	Hard	(New Zealand) Sebastian Lavie	(Japan) Takuto Niki (Japan) Arata Onozawa	7–6^{(9–7)}, 2–6, [12–10]
17 June 2013	Futures	Herzliya, F12	Hard	(France) Elie Rousset	(United Kingdom) Ashley Hewitt (United Kingdom) George Morgan	6–1, 6–1
30 August 2013	Futures	Libreville, F2	Hard	(France) Elie Rousset	(India) Jeevan Nedunchezhiyan (India) Vishnu Vardhan	6–0, 6–0
17 May 2014	Futures	Akko, F6	Hard	(United States) Evan Song	(Argentina) Matías Franco Descotte (Brazil) Gustavo Guerses	6–2, 6–0
25 May 2014	Futures	Sousse, F2	Hard	(Italy) Claudio Grassi	(Tunisia) Moez Echargui (Tunisia) Slim Hamza	6–4, 7–6^{(7–2)}
1 June 2014	Futures	Sousse, F3	Hard	(Italy) Claudio Grassi	(France) Rémi Boutillier (France) Maxime Tchoutakian	6–2, 6–4
24 August 2014	Futures	Libreville, F1	Hard	(India) Jeevan Nedunchezhiyan	(South Africa) Ruan Roelofse (Zimbabwe) Mark Fynn	6–2, 6–2
31 August 2014	Futures	Libreville, F2	Hard	(India) Jeevan Nedunchezhiyan	(South Africa) Ruan Roelofse (Zimbabwe) Mark Fynn	7–6^{(7–5)}, 6–3

Runner-up (15)

Date	Category	Tournament	Surface	Partner	Opponent	Score
25 October 2010	Futures	Heraklion, F3	Carpet	(Republic of Ireland) Colin O'Brien	(Republic of Ireland) Daniel Glancy (United Kingdom) Marcus Willis	5–7, 7–5, [8–10]
14 March 2011	Futures	Albufeira, F3	Hard	(Republic of Ireland) Daniel Glancy	(Spain) Augustin Boje-Ordonez (United Kingdom) Morgan Phillips	3–6, 6–7^{(4–7)}
16 May 2011	Futures	Samsun, F18	Clay	(Republic of Ireland) Barry King	(Moldova) Andrei Ciumac (Ukraine) Denis Molchanov	3–6, 2–6
10 October 2011	Futures	Saint-Dizier, F18	Hard	(Republic of Ireland) James Cluskey	(Germany) Holger Fischer (Czech Republic) Jan Mertl	4–6, 5–7
7 November 2011	Challenger	Loughborough	Hard	(Republic of Ireland) Daniel Glancy	(United Kingdom) Jamie Delgado (United Kingdom) Jonathan Marray	2–6, 2–6
11 June 2012	Futures	Martos, F16	Hard	(Republic of Ireland) James Cluskey	(Spain) Ivan Arenas-Gualda (Spain) Jaime Pulgar-Garcia	6–7^{(4–7)}, 6–7^{(7–9)}
20 August 2012	Futures	Enschede, F5	Clay	(Republic of Ireland) Daniel Glancy	(Netherlands Antilles) Alexander Blom (Netherlands) Kevin Griekspoor	3–6, 6–7^{(8–10)}
24 September 2012	Futures	Pozzuoli, F28	Hard	(Colombia) Cristian Rodríguez	(Italy) Enrico Fioravante (Italy) Matteo Volante	4–6, 2–6
29 October 2012	Futures	Ashkelon, F12	Hard	(New Zealand) Sebastian Lavie	(Netherlands) Stephan Fransen (Netherlands) Wesley Koolhof	6–4, 6–7^{(4–7)}, [9–11]
21 January 2013	Futures	Sheffield, F2	Hard	(Republic of Ireland) Colin O'Brien	(United Kingdom) Ken Skupski (United Kingdom) Neal Skupski	6–3, 3–6, [5–10]
25 February 2013	Futures	Loulé Municipality, F2	Hard	(Republic of Ireland) Colin O'Brien	(Spain) Ivan Arenas-Gualda (Spain) Enrique López Pérez	7–6^{(7–2)}, 6–7^{(5–7)}, [4–10]
6 May 2013	Futures	Ramat HaSharon, F9	Hard	(Republic of Ireland) Daniel Glancy	(Japan) Takuto Niki (Japan) Arata Onozawa	3–6, 4–6
10 June 2013	Futures	Herzliya, F11	Hard	(Czech Republic) Michal Konečný	(France) Albano Olivetti (France) Elie Rousset	4–6, 7–6^{(7–5)} [4–10]
19 August 2013	Futures	Libreville, F1	Hard	(France) Elie Rousset	(India) Jeevan Nedunchezhiyan (India) Vishnu Vardhan	4–6, 6–7^{(4–7)}
29 September 2013	Futures	Marathon, F12	Hard	(Brazil) Tiago Fernandes	(Netherlands) Kevin Griekspoor (Netherlands) Scott Griekspoor	7–6^{(7–5)}, 3–6, [5–10]
