= GB Pro-Series Loughborough =

Aegon GB Pro-Series Loughborough

Tournament information
- Event name: Loughborough
- Location: Loughborough, United Kingdom
- Venue: Loughborough University Tennis Centre
- Surface: Hard (indoor)
- Website: official website
ATP Tour
- Category: ATP Challenger Tour
- Prize money: $50,000
WTA Tour
- Category: ITF Women's Circuit
- Prize money: $25,000 / $10,000

The Aegon GB Pro-Series Loughborough is a tennis tournament that has been held in Loughborough, United Kingdom, since 2010. It is played on indoor hardcourts. The event is part of the ITF Women's Circuits. Until 2012, the tournament was part of the ATP Challenger Tour.

== Past finals ==
=== Men's singles ===
Year	Champion	Runner-up	Score
2012	(Russia) Evgeny Donskoy	(Germany) Jan-Lennard Struff	6–2, 4–6, 6–1
2011	(Germany) Tobias Kamke	(Italy) Flavio Cipolla	6–2, 7–5
2010	(Germany) Matthias Bachinger	(Denmark) Frederik Nielsen	6–3, 3–6, 6–1

=== Women's singles ===
Year	Champion	Runner-up	Score
2024 (2)	(Switzerland) Susan Bandecchi	(United Kingdom) Ranah Stoiber	6–4, 3–6, 6–1
2024	(United Kingdom) Sonay Kartal	(France) Manon Léonard	6–4, 6–1
2023	(Switzerland) Céline Naef	(United Kingdom) Eliz Maloney	6–0, 6–4
2022 (2)	(United Kingdom) Emily Appleton	(Uzbekistan) Nigina Abduraimova	6–4, 6–4
2022 (1)	(Denmark) Sofia Samavati	(Georgia (country)) Mariam Bolkvadze	6–2, 5–5 ret.
2020–21	tournament cancelled due to the COVID-19 pandemic		
2019	not held		
2018	(Czech Republic) Tereza Smitková	(Switzerland) Conny Perrin	6–3, 6–2
2017	not held		
2016	(France) Elixane Lechemia	(Czech Republic) Petra Krejsová	7–5, 6–1
2015	(Croatia) Jana Fett	(Italy) Cristiana Ferrando	6–2, 6–1
2014	(Republic of Ireland) Amy Bowtell	(France) Sherazad Reix	6–7^{(6–8)}, 6–1, 7–6^{(7–3)}
2013 (2)	(United Kingdom) Anna Smith	(Belgium) Klaartje Liebens	6–3, 7–5
2013 (1)	(Germany) Anna-Lena Friedsam	(Belgium) Alison Van Uytvanck	6–3, 6–0
2012	(Czech Republic) Renata Voráčová	(Germany) Julia Kimmelmann	7–5, 6–7^{(6–8)}, 6–3
2011	(United Kingdom) Tara Moore	(France) Myrtille Georges	7–6^{(7–5)}, 5–7, 6–4
2010	(Switzerland) Lara Michel	(United Kingdom) Anna Fitzpatrick	6–2, 6–2

=== Men's doubles ===
Year	Champions	Runners-up	Score
2012	(United States) James Cerretani (Canada) Adil Shamasdin	(India) Purav Raja (India) Divij Sharan	6–4, 7–5
2011	(United Kingdom) Jamie Delgado (United Kingdom) Jonathan Marray	(Republic of Ireland) Sam Barry (Republic of Ireland) Daniel Glancy	6–2, 6–2
2010	(Finland) Henri Kontinen (Denmark) Frederik Nielsen	(Australia) Jordan Kerr (United Kingdom) Ken Skupski	6–2, 6–4

=== Women's doubles ===
Year	Champions	Runners-up	Score
2024 (2)	(Greece) Valentini Grammatikopoulou (Estonia) Elena Malõgina	(United Kingdom) Ella McDonald (United Kingdom) Ranah Stoiber	Walkover
2024	(United States) Liv Hovde (United Kingdom) Ella McDonald	(United Kingdom) Alicia Barnett (United Kingdom) Sarah Beth Grey	4–6, 6–2, [10–7]
2023	(Slovakia) Viktória Morvayová (Czech Republic) Anna Sisková	(Lithuania) Justina Mikulskytė (Netherlands) Bibiane Schoofs	6–3, 6–7^{(3–7)}, [10–6]
2022 (2)	(Chinese Taipei) Joanna Garland (Czech Republic) Gabriela Knutson	(Poland) Martyna Kubka (Estonia) Elena Malõgina	6–3, 6–3
2022 (1)	(Germany) Anna Gabric (Romania) Arina Vasilescu	(United Kingdom) Emily Appleton (United Kingdom) Ali Collins	6–4, 7–5
2020–21	tournament cancelled due to the COVID-19 pandemic		
2019	not held		
2018	(Netherlands) Michaëlla Krajicek (Netherlands) Bibiane Schoofs	(United Kingdom) Tara Moore (Switzerland) Conny Perrin	6–7^{(5–7)}, 6–1, [10–6]
2017	not held		
2016	(United States) Dasha Ivanova (Czech Republic) Petra Krejsová	(United Kingdom) Sarah Beth Grey (United Kingdom) Olivia Nicholls	7–6^{(7–2)}, 7–6^{(7–2)}
2015	(United Kingdom) Freya Christie (United Kingdom) Lisa Whybourn	(Samoa) Steffi Carruthers (Mexico) Sabastiani León	6–1, 6–2
2014	(Czech Republic) Martina Borecká (France) Sherazad Reix	(Republic of Ireland) Amy Bowtell (United Kingdom) Lucy Brown	6–3, 6–2
2013 (2)	(United Kingdom) Jocelyn Rae (United Kingdom) Anna Smith	(Italy) Francesca Palmigiano (Italy) Camilla Rosatello	6–0, 4–6, [10–3]
2013 (1)	(Turkey) Çağla Büyükakçay (Turkey) Pemra Özgen	(Poland) Magda Linette (Czech Republic) Tereza Smitková	6–2, 5–7, [10–6]
2012	(United Kingdom) Anna Fitzpatrick (United Kingdom) Jade Windley	(Denmark) Karen Barbat (Switzerland) Lara Michel	6–2, 6–2
2011	(United Kingdom) Tara Moore (United Kingdom) Francesca Stephenson	(Denmark) Malou Ejdesgaard (United Kingdom) Amanda Elliott	3–6, 6–2, [10–3]
2010	(United Kingdom) Jocelyn Rae (United Kingdom) Jade Windley	(Czech Republic) Jana Jandová (Czech Republic) Petra Krejsová	6–3, 5–7, [10–4]
