= Carolin Daniels =

German tennis player

- Country (sports): Germany
- Born: 10 June 1992 (age 32); Paderborn
- Plays: Right-handed (two-handed backhand)
- Prize money: $58,291

Singles
- Career record: 145–118
- Career titles: 1 ITF
- Highest ranking: No. 363 (26 October 2015)

Doubles
- Career record: 149–87
- Career titles: 18 ITF
- Highest ranking: No. 143 (2 November 2015)

Carolin Daniels (born 10 June 1992) is a German former professional tennis player.

On 26 October 2015, she reached her best singles ranking of world No. 363. On 2 November 2015, she peaked at No. 143 in the doubles rankings. In her career, she won one singles title and 18 doubles titles on the ITF Circuit.

Daniels made her WTA Tour main-draw debut at the 2015 Internationaux de Strasbourg, in the doubles draw, partnering Michelle Sammons.

== ITF Circuit finals ==
=== Singles: 4 (1 title, 3 runner-ups) ===
Legend $50,000 tournaments $25,000 tournaments $10,000 tournaments	Finals by surface Hard (0–0) Clay (1–3) Carpet (0–0)

Result	No.	Date	Tournament	Surface	Opponent	Score
Loss	1.	26 August 2012	ITF Enschede, Netherlands	Clay	(Belgium) Elyne Boeykens	6–4, 3–6, 4–6
Win	1.	29 July 2013	ITF Horb, Germany	Clay	(Netherlands) Cindy Burger	7–5, 6–4
Loss	2.	17 May 2014	ITF Båstad, Sweden	Clay	(Greece) Maria Sakkari	5–7, 2–6
Loss	3.	30 May 2015	ITF Moscow, Russia	Clay	(Russia) Polina Vinogradova	7–6^{(7)}, 3–6, 1–6

=== Doubles: 38 (18 titles, 20 runner-ups) ===
Legend $50,000 tournaments $25,000 tournaments $15,000 tournaments $10,000 tournaments	Finals by surface Hard (5–2) Clay (12–17) Grass (0–0) Carpet (1–1)

Outcome	No.	Date	Tournament	Surface	Partner	Opponents	Score
Runner-up	1.	11 June 2010	ITF Apeldoorn, Netherlands	Clay	(Germany) Nina Zander	(Belgium) Elyne Boeykens (Netherlands) Leonie Mekel	6–4, 3–6, [4–10]
Runner-up	2.	28 August 2010	ITF Enschede, Netherlands	Clay	(Germany) Julia Wachaczyk	(Poland) Olga Brózda (Poland) Natalia Kołat	1–6, 3–6
Runner-up	3.	19 June 2011	ITF Cologne, Germany	Clay	(Germany) Christina Shakovets	(Germany) Vanessa Henke (Germany) Anna Zaja	6–1, 3–6, [2–10]
Winner	1.	25 September 2011	ITF Espinho, Portugal	Clay	(Germany) Karolina Nowak	(France) Morgane Pons (France) Alice Tisset	6–3, 6–0
Winner	2.	8 October 2011	ITF Settimo San Pietro, Italy	Clay	(Germany) Laura Schaeder	(Italy) Federica Di Sarra (Italy) Alice Savoretti	7–5, 6–4
Winner	3.	22 April 2012	ITF Les Franqueses del Vallès, Spain	Hard	(Russia) Eugeniya Pashkova	(India) Sharmada Balu (China) He Sirui	6–4, 6–3
Winner	4.	29 April 2012	ITF Bournemouth, UK	Clay	(Germany) Dejana Raickovic	(Republic of Ireland) Amy Bowtell (United Kingdom) Lucy Brown	6–4, 6–3
Runner-up	4.	13 May 2012	ITF Bad Saarow, Germany	Clay	(Germany) Dejana Raickovic	(Czech Republic) Simona Dobrá (Czech Republic) Martina Borecká	2–6, 2–6
Runner-up	5.	24 June 2012	ITF Alkmaar, Netherlands	Clay	(Belarus) Sviatlana Pirazhenka	(Belgium) Elyne Boeykens (United States) Caitlin Whoriskey	2–6, 4–6
Runner-up	6.	30 June 2012	ITF Breda, Netherlands	Clay	(Switzerland) Xenia Knoll	(Belgium) Ysaline Bonaventure (Bulgaria) Isabella Shinikova	4–6, 6–7^{(5)}
Runner-up	7.	28 July 2012	ITF Horb, Germany	Clay	(Germany) Dejana Raickovic	(New Zealand) Emma Hayman (Netherlands) Jade Schoelink	6–2, 3–6, [8–10]
Winner	5.	1 September 2012	ITF Rotterdam, Netherlands	Clay	(Germany) Franziska Koenig	(France) Anaïs Laurendon (France) Morgane Pons	6–3, 6–4
Winner	6.	6 September 2012	ITF Engis, Belgium	Clay	(Germany) Laura Schaeder	(Greece) Valentini Grammatikopoulou (Germany) Lena Lutzeier	6–4, 6–1
Runner-up	8.	3 November 2012	ITF Stockholm, Sweden	Hard (i)	(Germany) Laura Schaeder	(Sweden) Hilda Melander (Sweden) Paulina Milosavljevic	2–6, 1–6
Winner	7.	15 February 2013	ITF Leimen, Germany	Hard (i)	(Germany) Laura Siegemund	(Germany) Antonia Lottner (Russia) Daria Salnikova	6–1, 6–4
Runner-up	9.	14 July 2013	ITF Aschaffenburg, Germany	Clay	(Germany) Laura Schaeder	(Netherlands) Demi Schuurs (Netherlands) Eva Wacanno	5–7, 6–1, [12–14]
Runner-up	10.	28 July 2013	ITF Horb, Germany	Clay	(Germany) Laura Schaeder	(Sweden) Hilda Melander (Russia) Tatiana Kotelnikova	3–6, 3–6
Winner	8.	17 August 2013	ITF Ratingen, Germany	Clay	(Germany) Anna Klasen	(Australia) Karolina Wlodarczak (Netherlands) Bernice van de Velde	7–5, 6–2
Runner-up	11.	27 September 2013	ITF Pula, Italy	Clay	(Germany) Laura Schaeder	(Italy) Alice Matteucci (Italy) Claudia Giovine	6–1, 3–6, [5–10]
Winner	9.	18 January 2014	ITF Stuttgart, Germany	Hard (i)	(Germany) Laura Schaeder	(Germany) Lisa Ponomar (Switzerland) Karin Kennel	4–6, 6–1, [10–7]
Winner	10.	14 February 2014	ITF Stockholm, Sweden	Hard (i)	(Russia) Margalita Lazareva	(Germany) Luisa Marie Huber (Germany) Nora Niedmers	7–5, 6–3
Winner	11.	22 February 2014	AK Ladies Open, Germany	Carpet (i)	(Germany) Laura Schaeder	(Italy) Claudia Giovine (Germany) Justine Ozga	1–6, 6–4, [10–7]
Runner-up	12.	14 March 2014	ITF Gonesse, France	Clay (i)	(Germany) Lena-Marie Hofmann	(France) Jessika Ponchet (Czech Republic) Karolína Stuchlá	7–6^{(4)}, 3–6, [3–10]
Winner	12.	16 May 2014	ITF Båstad, Sweden	Clay	(Ukraine) Olga Ianchuk	(Russia) Anna Smolina (Russia) Liubov Vasilyeva	6–4, 6–3
Runner-up	13.	7 June 2014	ITF Sarajevo, Bosnia and Herzegovina	Clay	(Turkey) Melis Sezer	(Czech Republic) Barbora Krejčíková (Bulgaria) Viktoriya Tomova	6–7, 2–6
Runner-up	14.	20 July 2014	ITF Darmstadt, Germany	Clay	(Germany) Laura Schaeder	(Germany) Nicola Geuer (Switzerland) Viktorija Golubic	7–5, 2–6, [3–10]
Runner-up	15.	27 July 2014	ITF Horb, Germany	Clay	(Germany) Laura Schaeder	(Sweden) Hilda Melander (Czech Republic) Barbora Štefková	4–6, 1–6
Runner-up	16.	10 August 2014	Ladies Open Hechingen, Germany	Clay	(Germany) Antonia Lottner	(Romania) Elena Bogdan (Russia) Valeria Solovyeva	3–6, 1–6
Runner-up	17.	31 October 2014	ITF Margaret River, Australia	Hard	(Germany) Laura Schaeder	(Japan) Miyabi Inoue (Thailand) Varatchaya Wongteanchai	6–4, 4–6, [3–10]
Runner-up	18.	24 January 2015	ITF Kaarst, Germany	Carpet (i)	(Germany) Nicola Geuer	(Poland) Natalia Siedliska (Netherlands) Mandy Wagemaker	6–3, 4–6, [4–10]
Winner	13.	28 March 2015	ITF Port El Kantaoui, Tunisia	Hard	(Poland) Justyna Jegiołka	(Oman) Fatma Al-Nabhani (Bulgaria) Isabella Shinikova	7–5, 5–7, [10–5]
Winner	14.	2 May 2015	Wiesbaden Open, Germany	Clay	(Switzerland) Viktorija Golubic	(Netherlands) Cindy Burger (Ukraine) Veronika Kapshay	6–4, 4–6, [10–6]
Runner-up	19.	8 May 2015	ITF Båstad, Sweden	Clay	(Germany) Laura Schaeder	(Sweden) Cornelia Lister (Colombia) Yuliana Lizarazo	5–7, 7–5, [8–10]
Winner	15.	30 May 2015	ITF Moscow, Russia	Clay	(Ukraine) Alyona Sotnikova	(Ukraine) Olga Ianchuk (Russia) Darya Kasatkina	6–2, 7–6^{(10)}
Runner-up	20.	12 June 2015	Bredeney Ladies Open, Germany	Clay	(Germany) Antonia Lottner	(Germany) Nicola Geuer (Switzerland) Viktorija Golubic	3–6, 3–6
Winner	16.	2 August 2015	ITF Horb, Germany	Clay	(Belarus) Lidziya Marozava	(Argentina) Catalina Pella (Argentina) Guadalupe Pérez Rojas	7–6^{(3)}, 4–6, [10–7]
Winner	17.	21 August 2015	ITF Saint Petersburg, Russia	Clay	(Belarus) Lidziya Marozava	(Russia) Natela Dzalamidze (Russia) Veronika Kudermetova	6–4, 4–6, [10–6]
Winner	18.	10 June 2017	Bredeney Ladies Open, Germany	Clay	(Belarus) Lidziya Marozava	(Bosnia and Herzegovina) Anita Husarić (Belgium) Kimberley Zimmermann	6–1, 6–4
