= Petra Krejsová =

Czech tennis player

- Country (sports): Czech Republic
- Born: 30 June 1990 (age 36) Czechoslovakia
- Plays: Right (two-handed backhand)
- Prize money: $116,437

Singles
- Career record: 238–186
- Career titles: 7 ITF
- Highest ranking: No. 221 (23 October 2017)

Doubles
- Career record: 223–116
- Career titles: 29 ITF
- Highest ranking: No. 158 (23 July 2018)

Petra Krejsová (born 30 June 1990) is a Czech former professional tennis player.

In her career, Krejsová won seven singles titles and 29 doubles titles on the ITF Women's Circuit. On 23 October 2017, she reached her best singles ranking of world No. 221. On 23 July 2018, she peaked at No. 158 in the WTA doubles rankings.

== ITF Circuit finals ==
=== Singles: 11 (7 titles, 4 runner–ups) ===
Legend $60,000 tournaments $25,000 tournaments $10/15,000 tournaments	Finals by surface Hard (3–2) Clay (3–1) Carpet (1–1)

Result	W–L	Date	Tournament	Tier	Surface	Opponent	Score
Win	1–0	Jul 2014	ITF Horb, Germany	10,000	Clay	(Czech Republic) Jesika Malečková	7–5, 7–5
Win	2–0	Sep 2014	ITF Prague, Czech Republic	10,000	Clay	(Slovakia) Nikola Vajdová	6–2, 6–4
Loss	2–1	Aug 2016	ITF Vienna, Austria	10,000	Clay	(Austria) Mira Antonitsch	6–3, 6–7^{(2)}, 6–7^{(2)}
Win	3–1	Aug 2016	ITF Prague, Czech Republic	10,000	Clay	(Czech Republic) Miriam Kolodziejová	7–5, 7–6^{(4)}
Loss	3–2	Oct 2016	GB Pro-Series Loughborough, UK	10,000	Hard (i)	(France) Elixane Lechemia	5–7, 1–6
Win	4–2	Oct 2016	ITF Sheffield, England	10,000	Hard (i)	(France) Lou Brouleau	6–4, 6–3
Win	5–2	Nov 2016	GB Pro-Series Shrewsbury, UK	10,000	Hard (i)	(Switzerland) Tess Sugnaux	6–1, 7–5
Win	6–2	Feb 2017	GB Pro-Series Glasgow, UK	15,000	Hard (i)	(Netherlands) Bibiane Schoofs	2–6, 7–5, 6–4
Win	7–2	Mar 2017	ITF Solarino, Italy	15,000	Carpet	(Slovakia) Natália Vajdová	6–2, 5–7, 6–0
Loss	7–3	Mar 2017	ITF Solarino, Italy	15,000	Carpet	(Russia) Marta Paigina	7–6^{(4)}, 3–6, 3–6
Loss	7–4	Apr 2017	Lale Cup İstanbul, Turkey	60,000	Hard	(Turkey) Başak Eraydın	3–6, 0–6

=== Doubles: 54 (29 titles, 25 runner–ups) ===
Legend $80,000 tournaments $50/60,000 tournaments $25,000 tournaments $10/15,000 tournaments	Finals by surface Hard (7–8) Clay (17–17) Carpet (5–0)

Result	No.	Date	Tournament	Tier	Surface	Partner	Opponents	Score
Loss	1.	12 July 2010	ITF Piešťany, Slovakia	10,000	Clay	(Czech Republic) Gabriela Horáčková	(Poland) Weronika Domagała (Poland) Paula Kania	1–6, 1–6
Loss	2.	8 November 2010	GB Pro-Series Loughborough, UK	10,000	Hard (i)	(Czech Republic) Jana Jandová	(United Kingdom) Jocelyn Rae (United Kingdom) Jade Windley	3–6, 7–5, [4–10]
Win	1.	14 February 2011	ITF Leimen, Germany	10,000	Hard (i)	(Czech Republic) Martina Borecká	(Netherlands) Kim Kilsdonk (Netherlands) Nicolette van Uitert	2–6, 7–6^{(5)}, [10–4]
Loss	3.	28 February 2011	ITF Lyon, France	10,000	Hard (i)	(Czech Republic) Martina Borecká	(Croatia) Maria Abramović (Georgia (country)) Sofia Kvatsabaia	4–6, 6–3, [5–10]
Win	2.	7 March 2011	ITF Dijon, France	10,000	Hard (i)	(Czech Republic) Martina Borecká	(Croatia) Maria Abramović (Georgia (country)) Sofia Kvatsabaia	6–3, 6–4
Loss	4.	8 August 2011	ITF Doboj, Bosnia & Herzegovina	10,000	Clay	(Czech Republic) Martina Borecká	(Slovakia) Vivien Juhászová (Poland) Barbara Sobaszkiewicz	5–7, 3–6
Loss	5.	26 September 2011	ITF Umag, Croatia	10,000	Clay	(Czech Republic) Martina Borecká	(Slovakia) Lucia Butkovská (Serbia) Natalija Kostić	5–7, 6–3, [6–10]
Win	3.	3 October 2011	ITF Solin, Croatia	10,000	Clay	(Czech Republic) Martina Borecká	(Slovakia) Karin Morgošová (Slovakia) Lenka Tvarošková	3–6, 6–4, [10–3]
Loss	6.	31 October 2011	ITF Sunderland, UK	10,000	Hard (i)	(Czech Republic) Martina Borecká	(Netherlands) Eva Wacanno (United States) Caitlin Whoriskey	2–6, 6–4, [8–10]
Win	4.	2 April 2012	ITF Heraklion, Greece	10,000	Carpet	(Czech Republic) Martina Borecká	(North Macedonia) Lina Gjorcheska (Greece) Despoina Vogasari	6–0, 6–0
Win	5.	9 April 2012	ITF Heraklion, Greece	10,000	Carpet	(Czech Republic) Martina Borecká	(North Macedonia) Lina Gjorcheska (Greece) Despoina Vogasari	6–2, 6–3
Win	6.	16 April 2012	ITF Heraklion, Greece	10,000	Carpet	(Croatia) Silvia Njirić	(Czech Republic) Dana Machálková (Czech Republic) Tereza Malíková	6–7^{(7)}, 6–3, [10–6]
Win	7.	23 April 2012	ITF Rethymno, Greece	10,000	Hard	(Croatia) Silvia Njirić	(Greece) Adreanna Christopoulou (Greece) Irini Papageorgiou	3–6, 6–3, [10–7]
Loss	7.	11 June 2012	ITF Jablonec nad Nisou, Czech Republic	10,000	Clay	(Czech Republic) Martina Borecká	(Russia) Victoria Kan (Czech Republic) Kateřina Siniaková	4–6, 3–6
Loss	8.	16 July 2012	ITF Darmstadt, Germany	25,000	Clay	(Czech Republic) Martina Borecká	(Germany) Julia Kimmelmann (Germany) Antonia Lottner	3–6, 1–6
Loss	9.	27 August 2012	ITF Osijek, Croatia	10,000	Clay	(Czech Republic) Kateřina Kramperová	(Czech Republic) Aneta Dvořáková (Czech Republic) Barbora Krejčíková	4–6, 6–3, [8–10]
Win	8.	3 September 2012	ITF Trieste, Italy	10,000	Clay	(Czech Republic) Jesika Malečková	(Italy) Giulia Gabba (Italy) Alice Savoretti	7–6^{(4)}, 6–1
Win	9.	5 November 2012	ITF Antalya, Turkey	10,000	Clay	(Hungary) Ágnes Bukta	(Romania) Diana Buzean (Netherlands) Daniëlle Harmsen	w/o
Loss	10.	4 March 2013	ITF Sutton, UK	10,000	Hard (i)	(Czech Republic) Martina Borecká	(United Kingdom) Anna Fitzpatrick (United Kingdom) Jade Windley	6–4, 6–7^{(4)}, [10–12]
Loss	11.	1 April 2013	ITF Antalya, Turkey	10,000	Hard	(Czech Republic) Martina Borecká	(Switzerland) Viktorija Golubic (Philippines) Katharina Lehnert	7–5, 3–6, [7–10]
Win	10.	1 July 2013	ITF Přerov, Czech Republic	15,000	Clay	(Czech Republic) Jesika Malečková	(Russia) Victoria Kan (Ukraine) Ganna Poznikhirenko	6–1, 4–6, [10–5]
Loss	12.	2 September 2013	Save Cup, Italy	50,000	Clay	(Czech Republic) Tereza Smitková	(France) Laura Thorpe (Liechtenstein) Stephanie Vogt	6–7^{(5)}, 5–7
Win	11.	21 April 2014	ITF Istanbul, Turkey	50,000	Hard	(Czech Republic) Tereza Smitková	(Netherlands) Michaëlla Krajicek (Serbia) Aleksandra Krunić	1–6, 7–6^{(2)}, [11–9]
Loss	13.	23 June 2014	ITF Siófok, Hungary	25,000	Clay	(Czech Republic) Martina Borecká	(Czech Republic) Denisa Allertová (Slovakia) Chantal Škamlová	1–6, 3–6
Win	12.	1 September 2014	ITF Prague, Czech Republic	10,000	Clay	(Slovakia) Zuzana Luknárová	(Czech Republic) Lenka Kunčíková (Czech Republic) Karolína Stuchlá	4–6, 6–3, [10–6]
Loss	14.	15 September 2014	ITF Hluboká nad Vltavou, Czech Republic	10,000	Clay	(Czech Republic) Veronika Kolářová	(Slovakia) Jana Jablonovská (Czech Republic) Karolína Muchová	6–7^{(2)}, 5–7
Win	13.	23 March 2015	ITF Palm Harbor, United States	25,000	Clay	(Brazil) Paula Cristina Gonçalves	(Argentina) María Irigoyen (Argentina) Paula Ormaechea	6–2, 6–4
Loss	15.	20 April 2015	Dothan Classic, United States	50,000	Clay	(Brazil) Paula Cristina Gonçalves	(United Kingdom) Johanna Konta (United States) Maria Sanchez	3–6, 4–6
Loss	16.	25 May 2015	Maribor Open, Slovenia	25,000	Clay	(Czech Republic) Kateřina Vaňková	(Georgia (country)) Ekaterine Gorgodze (Slovenia) Nastja Kolar	2–6, 4–6
Loss	17.	13 July 2015	ITF Nieuwpoort, Belgium	10,000	Clay	(United Kingdom) Francesca Stephenson	(Russia) Maria Marfutina (Australia) Alexandra Nancarrow	0–6, 6–2, [5–10]
Win	14.	11 January 2016	ITF Cairo, Egypt	10,000	Clay	(Slovakia) Chantal Škamlová	(Egypt) Ola Abou Zekry (Greece) Despina Papamichail	6–4, 6–0
Win	15.	18 January 2016	ITF Cairo, Egypt	10,000	Clay	(Slovakia) Chantal Škamlová	(India) Riya Bhatia (India) Eetee Maheta	6–3, 6–2
Win	16.	25 January 2016	ITF Cairo, Egypt	10,000	Clay	(Slovakia) Chantal Škamlová	(Egypt) Ola Abou Zekry (Greece) Despina Papamichail	7–6^{(2)}, 6–3
Win	17.	25 April 2016	ITF Tučepi, Croatia	10,000	Clay	(United States) Dasha Ivanova	(Finland) Emma Laine (Croatia) Adrijana Lekaj	6–3, 2–6, [10–5]
Win	18.	2 May 2016	ITF Bol, Croatia	10,000	Clay	(United States) Dasha Ivanova	(Australia) Naiktha Bains (United States) Alexandra Morozova	6–1, 6–3
Loss	18.	16 May 2016	ITF Bol, Croatia	10,000	Clay	(United States) Dasha Ivanova	(Australia) Naiktha Bains (United States) Alexandra Morozova	1–6, 6–2, [7–10]
Loss	19.	20 June 2016	ITF Breda, Netherlands	10,000	Clay	(United States) Dasha Ivanova	(Greece) Valentini Grammatikopoulou (Belarus) Sviatlana Pirazhenka	6–7^{(6)}, 4–6
Loss	20.	25 July 2016	Palić Open, Serbia	10,000	Clay	(Slovenia) Nina Potočnik	(Serbia) Barbara Bonić (Bulgaria) Dia Evtimova	3–6, 3–6
Loss	21.	1 August 2016	ITF Vienna, Austria	10,000	Clay	(Czech Republic) Anna Slováková	(Germany) Vivian Heisen (Austria) Janina Toljan	3–6, 2–6
Win	19.	15 August 2016	ITF Slovenská Ľupča, Slovakia	10,000	Clay	(Slovakia) Chantal Škamlová	(Slovakia) Barbara Kötelesová (Slovakia) Viktória Kužmová	6–2, 6–1
Win	20.	22 August 2016	ITF Nuremberg, Germany	10,000	Clay	(United States) Dasha Ivanova	(Germany) Katharina Hobgarski (Bosnia and Herzegovina) Anita Husarić	5–7, 6–1, [10–8]
Win	21.	26 September 2016	ITF Pula, Italy	10,000	Clay	(Italy) Dalila Spiteri	(India) Snehadevi Reddy (Bosnia and Herzegovina) Jelena Simić	6–0, 1–6, [10–3]
Win	22.	24 October 2016	GB Pro-Series Loughborough, UK	10,000	Hard (i)	(United States) Dasha Ivanova	(United Kingdom) Sarah Beth Grey (United Kingdom) Olivia Nicholls	7–6^{(2)}, 7–6^{(2)}
Loss	22.	4 February 2017	GB Pro-Series Glasgow, UK	15,000	Hard (i)	(Romania) Laura Ioana Andrei	(United Kingdom) Jocelyn Rae (United Kingdom) Anna Smith	3–6, 2–6
Win	23.	10 March 2017	ITF Solarino, Italy	15,000	Carpet	(Romania) Laura Ioana Andrei	(Switzerland) Ylena In-Albon (Italy) Tatiana Pieri	6–0, 6–3
Win	24.	16 March 2017	ITF Solarino, Italy	15,000	Carpet	(Romania) Laura Ioana Andrei	(Italy) Georgia Brescia (Switzerland) Ylena In-Albon	6–3, 6–2
Win	25.	5 August 2017	ITF Woking, England	25,000	Hard	(Romania) Laura Ioana Andrei	(Romania) Mihaela Buzărnescu (Poland) Justyna Jegiołka	4–6, 6–2, [11–9]
Win	26.	22 September 2017	Royal Cup, Montenegro	25,000	Clay	(Czech Republic) Jesika Malečková	(Slovakia) Tereza Mihalíková (Slovakia) Chantal Škamlová	6–2, 6–3
Win	27.	27 October 2017	ITF Istanbul, Turkey	25,000	Hard (i)	(Czech Republic) Jesika Malečková	(Turkey) İpek Öz (Russia) Ekaterina Yashina	6–4, 6–3
Loss	23.	27 January 2018	ITF Stuttgart, Germany	15,000	Hard (i)	(Czech Republic) Jesika Malečková	(Romania) Laura Ioana Andrei (Romania) Raluca Șerban	0–6, 7–6^{(7)}, [5–10]
Loss	24.	31 March 2018	Open de Seine-et-Marne, France	60,000	Hard (i)	(Czech Republic) Jesika Malečková	(Russia) Anna Kalinskaya (Slovakia) Viktória Kužmová	6–7^{(5)}, 1–6
Win	28.	21 July 2018	ITS Cup, Czech Republic	80,000	Clay	(Czech Republic) Jesika Malečková	(Czech Republic) Lucie Hradecká (Netherlands) Michaëlla Krajicek	6–2, 6–1
Loss	25.	18 August 2018	ITF Leipzig, Germany	25,000	Clay	(Czech Republic) Jesika Malečková	(Romania) Cristina Dinu (Ukraine) Ganna Poznikhirenko	6–4, 0–6, [5–10]
Win	29.	17 August 2019	ITF Leipzig, Germany	25,000	Clay	(Czech Republic) Jesika Malečková	(Kazakhstan) Anna Danilina (Germany) Vivian Heisen	4–6, 6–3, [10–6]
