= Anna Fitzpatrick =

British tennis player (born 1989)

- Country (sports): United Kingdom
- Born: 6 April 1989 (age 37) Sheffield, South Yorkshire, England
- Height: 1.73 m (5 ft 8 in)
- Turned pro: 2005
- Plays: Right-handed (two-handed backhand)
- Prize money: $96,813

Singles
- Career record: 163–154
- Career titles: 0 WTA, 3 ITF
- Highest ranking: No. 318 (16 June 2008)

Grand Slam singles results
- Wimbledon: Q2 (2007)

Doubles
- Career record: 155–125
- Career titles: 19 ITF
- Highest ranking: No. 215 (12 May 2008)

Grand Slam doubles results
- Wimbledon: 1R (2007, 2008)

Anna Fitzpatrick (born 6 April 1989) is a British former professional tennis player.

== Personal life ==
Fitzpatrick attended St Thomas of Canterbury school in Sheffield, St Mary's Roman Catholic High School, Chesterfield and Woodhouse Grove School in Apperley Bridge, City of Bradford. She has three older brothers. Growing up, she played tennis at Beauchief Tennis Club and at Graves Tennis Centre.

== Playing style ==
Fitzpatrick liked to play aggressively, coming to the net as often as possible. When at the back of the court she was looking for opportunities to attack, and often tried to serve and volley to change the pace of the match. According to Fitzpatrick, her volley was "what [her] whole game is built on" and her least favourite surface is clay.

== Career ==
=== Junior (2003–2007) ===
Fitzpatrick's first match on the junior ITF circuit came in July 2003 and her last in June 2007. During her four-year junior tennis career, she did not reach any tournament finals but reached the semi-finals of three tournaments, one of which was the 2007 Wimbledon girls' tournament where she lost to eventual champion, Urszula Radwańska, 6–7^{(3)}, 3–6. She also lost in the quarterfinals of a total of five tournaments. Her win–loss record for singles competition was 25–26.

As a junior doubles competitor, Fitzpatrick won one tournament (partnering Jade Curtis) and was a runner-up in another. She was also a semi-finalist four times and lost in the quarterfinals in nine tournaments. One of the tournaments in which Fitzpatrick became a quarterfinalist was in the 2007 Wimbledon girls' doubles tournament with Jade Curtis. She ended her junior career with a doubles win–loss record of 27–28. Her career-high combined singles and doubles ranking was world No. 180 (achieved 9 July 2007).

=== 2004–2006 ===
Fitzpatrick played her first professional match on the adult ITF Circuit in September 2004 when she attempted to qualify for the $10k event in Manchester. She lost in the second round of qualifying. Her only other tournament during 2004 was the $10k in Bolton where she also lost in round two of qualifying. She finished 2004 without a world ranking.

2005 saw Fitzpatrick play in a total of eleven ITF tournaments. She lost in round two in two tournaments, the first round in three and the qualifying stages a total of six times. Her first year-end ranking was world No. 1102.

In 2006, Fitzpatrick made very little progress on the ITF Circuit until August when she won her first ever ITF title in the $10k event in Ilkley without losing a set in the entire tournament. She beat fellow British teen, Anna Smith, in the final, 6–4, 6–3. She carried this momentum over into her next tournament (Wrexham $10k) where she reached the semi-finals and she also made a run into the final of her next tournament, the $10k in London. She was beaten by Nadja Roma, 3–6, 3–6, in the final. She finished the season with her ranking at world No. 676.

=== 2007 ===
In March 2007, Fitzpatrick reached the third ITF singles final of her career in Sunderland $10k where she lost to Gaëlle Widmer in straight sets, 4–6, 1–6. In April she became a quarterfinalist in the $10,000 event in Bath and one month later she lost in the quarterfinals of a $25k event in Antalya as a qualifier. June saw Fitzpatrick make her debut on the WTA Tour when she was given a wildcard into the qualifying draw of the DFS Classic. She faced American, Lilia Osterloh, in the first round and was unable to capitalise on her one set lead, eventually losing, 7–5, 3–6, 1–6.

Fitzpatrick earned a wildcard into the qualifying event for Wimbledon one week later by winning two matches in the LTA Wildcard Play-offs. She managed to beat Junri Namigata, a player ranked 278 places above her, in the first round of the qualifying tournament with a score of 7–5, 6–0. The No. 8 seed in the qualifying tournament, Mathilde Johansson, proved too much for Fitzpatrick in round two and Fitzpatrick lost, 1–6, 2–6. In July, she reached the semifinals of a $10k event in Calgary (where she won the doubles tournament to give her the first doubles title of her career) and in September she reached the semifinals of another $10k event, this one in Nottingham. She did not pass the second round in any other ITF tournaments that season and finished the year with a ranking of world No. 383.

=== 2008 ===
In April 2008, Fitzpatrick reached her first ITF quarterfinal of the year in Toluca, a $10k tournament. Just two weeks later she reached her second of the year, this one in Irapuato $25k. In June, the first of four consecutive wildcards allowed her direct entry into the main draw of the $50k event in Surbiton where she lost to Georgie Stoop in round one. Her second wild card of June entered her into the main draw of the DFS Classic, a Tier III tournament. She was beaten by Melanie South, 4–6, 4–6, in round one. Wild card number three allowed her access into the qualifying draw of the International Women's Open where world No. 62, Ekaterina Makarova, beat her in straight sets, 6–7^{(4)}, 3–6. Her fourth of four consecutive wild cards gave her entry into the qualifying draw of Wimbledon where she was beaten by Yuliana Fedak from Ukraine. In early August, Fitzpatrick injured her foot while playing in an ITF in Portugal. The injury turned out to be a stress fracture in her left foot and it put her out of action for the rest of the season and as a result, she ended the season ranked world No. 424.

=== 2009 ===
Fitzpatrick returned to the ITF Circuit in March 2009. In her first tournament since injuring her foot, she partnered Stefania Boffa to win the title at the $10k tournament in Bath. She and Boffa again joined forced in their next tournament, the $25k in Jersey, where they reached the semifinals. She made her first real impact in singles in July when she reached a $10k quarterfinal before immediately going on to reach the final of another $10k. She beat the fourth, fifth and sixth seeds before losing to Heather Watson, 6–4, 4–6, 2–6, in the final. In August, Fitzpatrick played her final tournament of 2009 (a $10k in London) where she was beaten by compatriot, Jocelyn Rae, in the semifinals. During this tournament, her foot injury worsened once again and forced her out until March/April 2010. As a result of this, Fitzpatrick's year-end singles ranking for 2009 was 761.

== ITF Circuit finals ==
=== Singles (3–4) ===
Legend $25,000 tournaments $10,000 tournaments	Finals by surface Hard (2–3) Grass (1–1)

Result	Date	Tier	Tournament	Surface	Opponent	Score
Win	1 August 2006	10,000	Ilkley, United Kingdom	Grass	(United Kingdom) Anna Smith	6–4, 6–3
Loss	22 August 2006	10,000	Cumberland, United Kingdom	Hard	(Sweden) Nadja Roma	3–6, 3–6
Loss	14 March 2007	10,000	Sunderland, United Kingdom	Hard (i)	(Switzerland) Gaëlle Widmer	4–6, 1–6
Loss	14 July 2009	10,000	Frinton, United Kingdom	Grass	(United Kingdom) Heather Watson	6–4, 4–6, 2–6
Win	3 November 2010	10,000	Sunderland, United Kingdom	Hard (i)	(United Kingdom) Samantha Murray	6–2, 3–6, 7–5
Loss	10 November 2010	10,000	Loughborough, United Kingdom	Hard (i)	(Switzerland) Lara Michel	2–6, 2–6
Win	19 January 2011	10,000	Wrexham, United Kingdom	Hard (i)	(United Kingdom) Jade Windley	6–7^{(3)}, 6–3, 7–5

=== Doubles (19–13) ===
Finals by category $50,000 tournaments $25,000 tournaments (5–3) $10,000 tournaments (14–10)	Finals by surface Hard (18–10) Clay (1–1) Grass (0–2)

Result	Date	Tier	Tournament	Surface	Partnering	Opponents	Score
Loss	2 August 2006	10,000	Ilkley, United Kingdom	Grass	(United Kingdom) Joanna Craven	(United Kingdom) Danielle Brown (United Kingdom) Elizabeth Thomas	2–6, 1–6
Loss	14 May 2007	25,000	Antalya, Turkey	Clay	(Montenegro) Ana Veselinović	(Germany) Korina Perkovic (Turkey) İpek Şenoğlu	6–1, 1–6, 4–6
Win	23 July 2007	10,000	Calgary, Canada	Hard	(Montenegro) Ana Veselinović	(Argentina) Soledad Esperón (Argentina) Agustina Lepore	6–4, 6–3
Loss	26 September 2007	25,000	Nottingham, United Kingdom	Hard	(Montenegro) Ana Veselinović	(Finland) Emma Laine (Belgium) Caroline Maes	3–6, 7–6^{(4)}, [6–10]
Win	19 February 2008	25,000	Clearwater, United States	Hard	(Montenegro) Ana Veselinović	(Chinese Taipei) Chan Chin-wei (Japan) Seiko Okamoto	6–2, 3–6, [10–6]
Win	26 February 2008	25,000	Fort Walton Beach, United States	Hard	(Montenegro) Ana Veselinović	(Netherlands) Nicole Thyssen (Netherlands) Pauline Wong	6–3, 7–6^{(4)}
Win	29 April 2008	25,000	Coatzacoalcos, Mexico	Hard	(United Kingdom) Anna Hawkins	(Argentina) María Irigoyen (Argentina) Agustina Lepore	6–2, 6–2
Loss	20 May 2008	10,000	Landisville, United States	Hard	(Switzerland) Stefania Boffa	(United States) Audra Cohen (Canada) Heidi El Tabakh	6–2, 6–2
Loss	8 July 2008	25,000	Valladolid, Spain	Hard	(Switzerland) Stefania Boffa	(Canada) Heidi El Tabakh (United States) Story Tweedie-Yates	2–6, 4–6
Win	19 March 2009	10,000	Bath, United Kingdom	Hard (i)	(Switzerland) Stefania Boffa	(Czech Republic) Veronika Chvojková (Czech Republic) Kateřina Vaňková	6–1, 6–1
Win	7 April 2009	10,000	Antalya, Turkey	Hard	(Denmark) Hanne Skak Jensen	(Georgia (country)) Sofia Kvatsabaia (Russia) Avgusta Tsybysheva	7–6^{(3)}, 2–6, [10–7]
Loss	14 July 2009	10,000	Frinton, United Kingdom	Grass	(Australia) Emelyn Starr	(United Kingdom) Jocelyn Rae (United Kingdom) Jade Windley	3–6, 5–7
Loss	17 March 2010	10,000	Bath, United Kingdom	Hard (i)	(United Kingdom) Jade Curtis	(Denmark) Malou Ejdesgaard (Poland) Katarzyna Piter	3–6, 2–6
Win	21 June 2010	10,000	Alcobaça, Portugal	Hard	(United Kingdom) Jade Windley	(Canada) Mélanie Gloria (Mexico) Daniela Múñoz Gallegos	6–2, 6–1
Loss	28 July 2010	10,000	Chiswick, United Kingdom	Hard	(United Kingdom) Jade Windley	(United Kingdom) Jocelyn Rae (Australia) Emelyn Starr	1–6, 4–6
Win	3 November 2010	10,000	Sunderland, United Kingdom	Hard (i)	(United Kingdom) Amanda Elliott	(United Kingdom) Tara Moore (United Kingdom) Francesca Stephenson	6–2, 6–3
Win	19 January 2011	10,000	Wrexham, United Kingdom	Hard (i)	(United Kingdom) Jade Windley	(Norway) Ulrikke Eikeri (United Kingdom) Nicola George	6–1, 6–0
Loss	8 February 2011	10,000	Vale do Lobo, Portugal	Hard	(Norway) Ulrikke Eikeri	(Spain) Rocio de la Torre Sánchez (Spain) Olga Sáez Larra	w/o
Win	10 May 2011	10,000	Heraklion, Greece	Hard	(United Kingdom) Samantha Murray	(United Kingdom) Amanda Elliott (Austria) Nicole Rottmann	6–3, 6–2
Loss	17 May 2011	10,000	Rethymno, Greece	Hard	(United Kingdom) Jade Windley	(Russia) Alexandra Artamonova (Latvia) Diāna Marcinkēviča	2–6, 3–6
Win	24 July 2011	25,000	Wrexham, United Kingdom	Hard	(United Kingdom) Jade Windley	(United Kingdom) Melanie South (Slovakia) Lenka Wienerová	6–2, 4–6, [10–3]
Win	10 September 2011	10,000	Madrid, Spain	Hard	(United Kingdom) Jade Windley	(Spain) Rocio de la Torre Sánchez (Spain) Georgina García Pérez	1–6, 6–0, [10–8]
Win	9 January 2012	10,000	Glasgow, United Kingdom	Hard (i)	(United Kingdom) Samantha Murray	(United Kingdom) Alexandra Walker (United Kingdom) Lisa Whybourn	6–2, 6–3
Win	27 February 2012	25,000	Wellington, New Zealand	Hard	(South Africa) Chanel Simmonds	(South Korea) Han Sung-hee (Japan) Yurina Koshino	6–3, 6–4
Loss	30 April 2012	10,000	Jakarta, Indonesia	Hard	(United Kingdom) Jade Windley	(China) Lu Jiaxiang (China) Lu Jiajing	4–6, 4–6
Win	5 November 2012	10,000	Loughborough, United Kingdom	Hard (i)	(United Kingdom) Jade Windley	(Denmark) Karen Barbat (Switzerland) Lara Michel	6–2, 6–2
Win	12 November 2012	10,000	Edgbaston, United Kingdom	Hard (i)	(United Kingdom) Jade Windley	(Czech Republic) Martina Kubiciková (Slovakia) Chantal Škamlová	6–2, 6–3
Win	4 March 2013	10,000	Sutton, United Kingdom	Hard (i)	(United Kingdom) Jade Windley	(Czech Republic) Martina Borecká (Czech Republic) Petra Krejsová	4–6, 7–6^{(7)}, [12–10]
Win	22 April 2013	10,000	Bournemouth, United Kingdom	Clay	(United Kingdom) Jade Windley	(Belgium) Elyne Boeykens (Australia) Karolina Wlodarczak	6–4, 6–1
Win	13 May 2013	10,000	Sharm El Sheikh, Egypt	Hard	(Montenegro) Ana Veselinović	(Turkey) Başak Eraydın (Turkey) Melis Sezer	2–6, 6–4, [10–3]
Loss	20 May 2013	10,000	Sharm El Sheikh, Egypt	Hard	(Kazakhstan) Kamila Kerimbayeva	(Italy) Camilla Rosatello (China) Zhu Aiwen	4–6, 3–6
Loss	29 July 2013	10,000	Nottingham, United Kingdom	Hard	(United Kingdom) Daneika Borthwick	(United Kingdom) Anna Smith (United Kingdom) Melanie South	4–6, 2–6
