= Jade Windley =

British tennis player

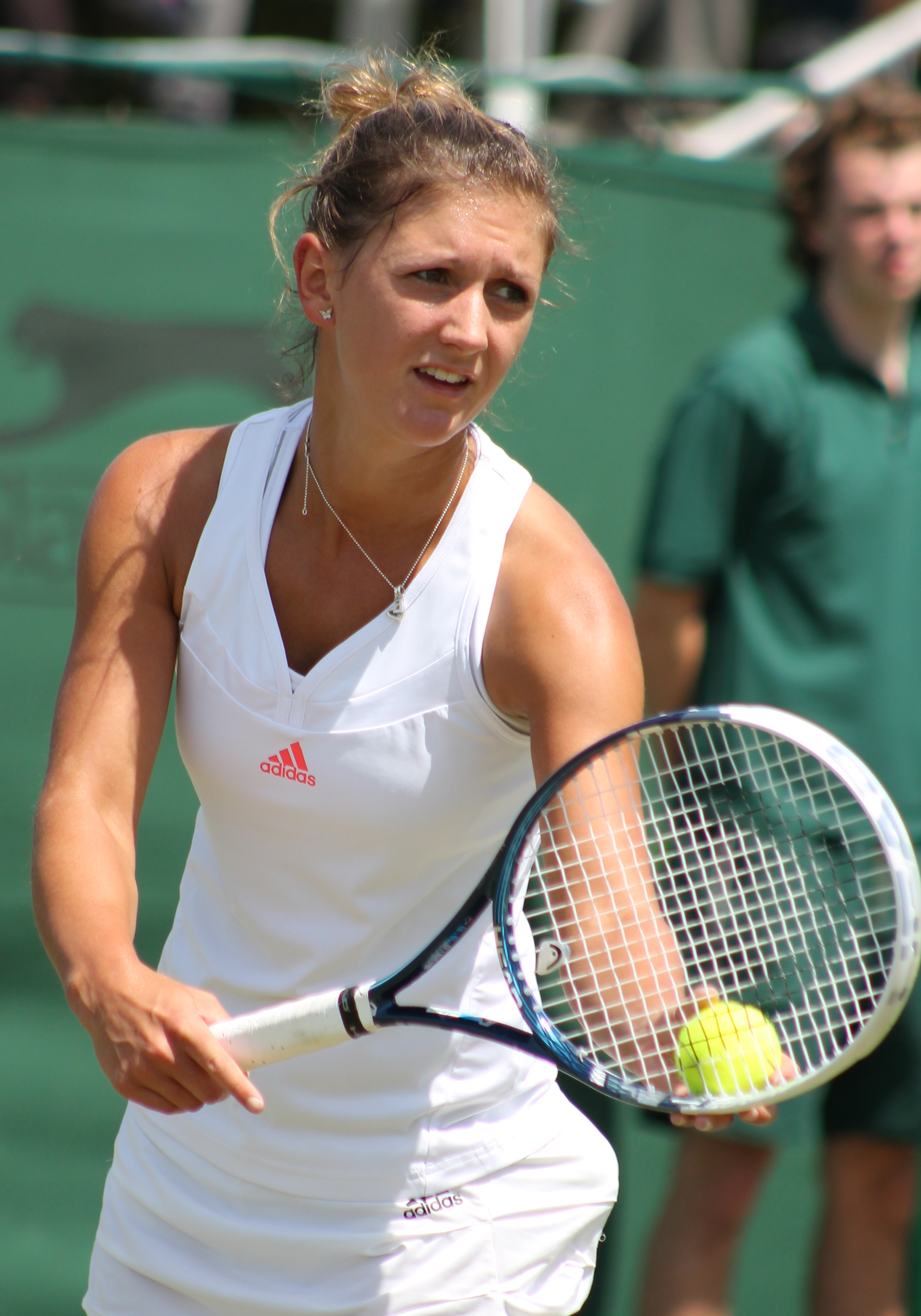
- Windley at the 2014 Wimbledon qualifying
- Country (sports): United Kingdom
- Born: 22 April 1990 (age 36) Lincolnshire, England
- Prize money: $92,027

Singles
- Career record: 136–131
- Career titles: 3 ITF
- Highest ranking: No. 279 (7 April 2014)

Grand Slam singles results
- Wimbledon: Q2 (2013)

Doubles
- Career record: 118–95
- Career titles: 16 ITF
- Highest ranking: No. 159 (7 April 2014)

Grand Slam doubles results
- Wimbledon: 1R (2013)

Jade Windley (born 22 April 1990 in Lincolnshire) is a British former tennis player.

In her career, Windley won three singles and 16 doubles titles on the ITF Women's Circuit. On 7 April 2014, she reached her best singles ranking of world No. 279, and she peaked at No. 159 in the doubles rankings.

Following a car accident, Windley was forced to retire from professional tennis. After her retirement, Windley became a tennis coach.

== ITF finals ==
=== Singles: 6 (3–3) ===
Legend $25,000 tournaments $10,000 tournaments	Finals by surface Hard (1–3) Clay (2–0)

Result	W–L	Date	Tournament	Surface	Opponent	Score
Win	1–0	31 August 2009	ITF Sutton, United Kingdom	Hard	(United Kingdom) Jocelyn Rae	6–1, 6–1
Loss	1–1	12 October 2009	ITF Mytilene, Greece	Hard	(United Kingdom) Jocelyn Rae	2–6, 1–6
Loss	1–2	17 January 2011	ITF Wrexham, UK	Hard (i)	(United Kingdom) Anna Fitzpatrick	7–6^{(3)}, 3–6, 5–7
Win	2–2	23 April 2012	ITF Bournemouth, UK	Clay	(United Kingdom) Naomi Broady	6–3, 6–1
Loss	2–3	30 July 2012	ITF Wrexham, UK	Hard	(Japan) Chiaki Okadaue	6–2, 6–7^{(6)}, 4–6
Win	3–3	22 April 2013	ITF Bournemouth, UK	Clay	(Belarus) Sviatlana Pirazhenka	6–7^{(2)}, 6–4, 6–2

=== Doubles: 25 (16–9) ===
Legend $50,000 tournaments $25,000 tournaments $10,000 tournaments	Finals by surface Hard (11–9) Clay (3–0) Grass (2–0)

Result	No.	Date	Tournament	Surface	Partner	Opponents	Score
Loss	1.	15 June 2009	ITF Alcobaça, Portugal	Hard	(South Africa) Monica Gorny	(Australia) Shannon Golds (Australia) Tammi Patterson	6–3, 2–6, [4–10]
Win	1.	6 July 2009	ITF Felixstowe, United Kingdom	Grass	(United Kingdom) Jocelyn Rae	(Slovenia) Dalila Jakupović (Germany) Sarah-Rebecca Sekulic	6–1, 6–0
Win	2.	13 July 2009	ITF Frinton, UK	Grass	(United Kingdom) Jocelyn Rae	(United Kingdom) Anna Fitzpatrick (Australia) Emelyn Starr	6–3, 7–5
Win	3.	31 August 2009	GB Pro-Series London-Cumberland, UK	Hard	(United Kingdom) Jocelyn Rae	(Switzerland) Lucia Kovarčíková (Czech Republic) Monika Tůmová	6–4, 6–0
Loss	2.	12 October 2009	ITF Mytilene, Greece	Hard	(United Kingdom) Jocelyn Rae	(Poland) Olga Brózda (Poland) Justyna Jegiołka	4–6, 4–6
Win	4.	21 June 2010	ITF Alcobaça, Portugal	Hard	(United Kingdom) Anna Fitzpatrick	(Canada) Mélanie Gloria (Mexico) Daniela Múñoz Gallegos	6–2, 6–1
Loss	3.	26 July 2010	ITF Chiswick, United Kingdom	Hard	(United Kingdom) Anna Fitzpatrick	(United Kingdom) Jocelyn Rae (Australia) Emelyn Starr	1–6, 4–6
Win	5.	8 November 2010	GB Pro-Series Loughborough, UK	Hard (i)	(United Kingdom) Jocelyn Rae	(Czech Republic) Jana Jandová (Czech Republic) Petra Krejsová	6–3, 5–7, [10–4]
Win	6.	17 January 2011	ITF Wrexham, United Kingdom	Hard (i)	(United Kingdom) Anna Fitzpatrick	(Norway) Ulrikke Eikeri (United Kingdom) Nicola George	6–1, 6–0
Win	7.	2 May 2011	ITF Edinburgh, United Kingdom	Clay	(United Kingdom) Samantha Murray	(South Africa) Surina de Beer (Germany) Scarlett Werner	7–5, 4–6, [10–8]
Loss	4.	16 May 2011	ITF Rethymno, Greece	Hard	(United Kingdom) Anna Fitzpatrick	(Russia) Alexandra Artamonova (Latvia) Diāna Marcinkēviča	2–6, 3–6
Win	8.	18 July 2011	ITF Wrexham, United Kingdom	Hard	(United Kingdom) Anna Fitzpatrick	(United Kingdom) Melanie South (Slovakia) Lenka Wienerová	6–2, 4–6, [10–3]
Win	9.	25 July 2011	ITF Chiswick, United Kingdom	Hard	(United Kingdom) Samantha Murray	(United Kingdom) Lucy Brown (United Kingdom) Francesca Stephenson	6–4, 6–4
Win	10.	5 September 2011	ITF Madrid, Spain	Hard	(United Kingdom) Anna Fitzpatrick	(Spain) Rocio de la Torre Sánchez (Spain) Georgina García Pérez	1–6, 6–0, [10–8]
Loss	5.	30 April 2012	ITF Jakarta, Indonesia	Hard	(United Kingdom) Anna Fitzpatrick	(China) Lu Jiajing (China) Lu Jiaxiang	4–6, 4–6
Loss	6.	24 September 2012	ITF Clermont-Ferrand, France	Hard (i)	(United Kingdom) Samantha Murray	(Latvia) Diāna Marcinkēviča (Netherlands) Bibiane Schoofs	3–6, 0–6
Win	11.	5 November 2012	GB Pro-Series Loughborough, UK	Hard (i)	(United Kingdom) Anna Fitzpatrick	(Denmark) Karen Barbat (Switzerland) Lara Michel	6–2, 6–2
Win	12.	12 November 2012	ITF Edgbaston, UK	Hard (i)	(United Kingdom) Anna Fitzpatrick	(Czech Republic) Martina Kubičíková (Slovakia) Chantal Škamlová	6–2, 6–3
Win	13.	19 November 2012	ITF La Vall d'Uixó, Spain	Clay	(Russia) Yana Sizikova	(Austria) Katharina Negrin (Russia) Ksenija Sharifova	6–3, 6–4
Win	14.	21 January 2013	ITF Preston, United Kingdom	Hard (i)	(United Kingdom) Samantha Murray	(United Kingdom) Tara Moore (United Kingdom) Melanie South	6–3, 3–6, [10–5]
Win	15.	4 March 2013	ITF Sutton, United Kingdom	Hard (i)	(United Kingdom) Anna Fitzpatrick	(Czech Republic) Martina Borecká (Czech Republic) Petra Krejsová	4–6, 7–6^{(4)}, [12–10]
Win	16.	22 April 2013	ITF Bournemouth, UK	Clay	(United Kingdom) Anna Fitzpatrick	(Belgium) Elyne Boeykens (Australia) Karolina Wlodarczak	6–4, 6–1
Loss	7.	6 May 2013	Johannesburg Open, South Africa	Hard	(United Kingdom) Samantha Murray	(Poland) Magda Linette (South Africa) Chanel Simmonds	1–6, 3–6
Loss	8.	22 July 2013	ITF Winnipeg, Canada	Hard	(United Kingdom) Samantha Murray	(Canada) Heidi El Tabakh (United States) Allie Kiick	4–6, 6–2, [8–10]
Loss	9.	16 September 2013	GB Pro-Series Shrewsbury, UK	Hard (i)	(United Kingdom) Samantha Murray	(Turkey) Çağla Büyükakçay (Turkey) Pemra Özgen	6–4, 4–6, [8–10]
