= Amanda Elliott =

British tennis player

- Country (sports): Great Britain
- Born: 1 November 1989 (age 36) Abbots Langley, Hertfordshire, England
- Height: 175 cm (5 ft 9 in)
- Turned pro: 2006
- Plays: Right-handed (double-handed backhand)
- Prize money: $60,252

Singles
- Career record: 68 – 115
- Career titles: 0 ITF
- Highest ranking: 311 (24 November 2008)

Grand Slam singles results
- Wimbledon: Q2 (2008)

Doubles
- Career record: 73 – 83
- Career titles: 4 ITF
- Highest ranking: 251 (4 May 2009)

Grand Slam doubles results
- Wimbledon: 1R (2008, 2009)
- Last updated on: 03 June 2016.

Amanda Elliott (born 1 November 1989) is a British tennis player.

Elliott has won 4 doubles titles on the ITF tour in her career. On 24 November 2008, she reached her best singles ranking of world number 311. On 4 May 2009, she peaked at world number 251 in the doubles rankings.

Elliott made her WTA main draw debut at the 2008 Banka Koper Slovenia Open in the doubles event partnering Han Xinyun.

Elliott competed in the Ladies Singles Qualifying event at The Championships, Wimbledon in 2008 and 2009, and competed in the Ladies Doubles event at The Championships, Wimbledon in 2008 and 2009, partnering Katie O'Brien and Elena Baltacha respectively. In 2008, Amanda Elliott and Katie O'Brien lost in the first round to Aiko Nakamura and Aravane Rezai 7–5, 6–4, and in 2009 Amanda Elliott and Elena Baltacha lost in the first round to Victoria Azarenka and Elena Vesnina 6–0, 6–4.

Since retiring from full time tennis, Elliott continues to have success with tennis, having recently won the Loughborough Tennis Alumni Event partnering Anne Meredith in the Ladies event and David Scales in the mixed.

== Personal life ==
Following tennis Amanda studied at Loughborough University where she achieved a 1st Class honours.

Elliott now works for Bjorn Borg as the UK Marketing Manager and travels throughout Europe with work.

== ITF finals ==
=== Singles (0–1) ===
Legend $100,000 tournaments $75,000 tournaments $50,000 tournaments $25,000 tournaments $15,000 tournaments $10,000 tournaments	Finals by surface Hard (0–0) Clay (0–1) Grass (0–0) Carpet (0–0)

Result	No.	Date	Tournament	Surface	Opponent	Score
Loss	1.	6 May 2007	Bournemouth, United Kingdom	Clay	(Russia) Anastasia Pivovarova	1–6, 0–6

=== Doubles (4–5) ===
Legend $100,000 tournaments $75,000 tournaments $50,000 tournaments $25,000 tournaments $15,000 tournaments $10,000 tournaments	Finals by surface Hard (14–4) Clay (1–2) Grass (3–1) Carpet (0–0)

Result	No.	Date	Tournament	Surface	Partner	Opponents	Score
Win	1.	26 October 2008	Glasgow, United Kingdom	Hard	(Switzerland) Stefania Boffa	(Romania) Laura Ioana Andrei (Romania) Irina-Camelia Begu	6–4, 7–6 ^{(7–3)}
Loss	1.	15 March 2009	Dijon, France	Hard	(France) Violette Huck	(Netherlands) Kim Kilsdonk (Netherlands) Daniëlle Harmsen	6–7^{(2–7)}, 1–6
Loss	2.	21 April 2009	Changwon, South Korea	Hard	(United Kingdom) Elena Baltacha	(Chinese Taipei) Chang Kai-Chen (Chinese Taipei) Chen Yi	4–6, 1–6
Win	2.	9 May 2010	Edinburgh, United Kingdom	Clay	(United Kingdom) Jocelyn Rae	(Hungary) Tímea Babos (United Kingdom) Tara Moore	7–6^{(7–5)}, 6–4
Win	3.	21 June 2010	Davos, Switzerland	Clay	(Australia) Emelyn Starr	(Switzerland) Sarah Moundir (Switzerland) Amra Sadiković	6–1, 6–2
Win	4.	3 November 2010	Sunderland, United Kingdom	Hard (i)	(United Kingdom) Anna Fitzpatrick	(United Kingdom) Tara Moore (United Kingdom) Francesca Stephenson	6–2, 6–3
Loss	3.	10 May 2011	Heraklion, Greece	Hard	(Austria) Nicole Rottmann	(United Kingdom) Samantha Murray (United Kingdom) Anna Fitzpatrick	3–6, 2–6
Loss	4.	19 September 2011	Shrewsbury, United Kingdom	Hard (i)	(United Kingdom) Johanna Konta	(Portugal) Maria João Koehler (Hungary) Katalin Marosi	6–7^{(3–7)}, 1–6
Loss	5.	12 November 2011	Loughborough, United Kingdom	Hard (i)	(Denmark) Malou Ejdesgaard	(United Kingdom) Tara Moore (United Kingdom) Francesca Stephenson	6–3, 2–6, [3–10]
