= Amy Bowtell =

Irish tennis player

- Country (sports): Ireland
- Born: 16 September 1993 (age 32) Dublin, Ireland
- Height: 1.83 m (6 ft 0 in)
- Turned pro: 2009
- Plays: Right-handed (two-handed backhand)
- Prize money: $34,664

Singles
- Career record: 139–87
- Career titles: 5 ITF
- Highest ranking: No. 381 (9 February 2015)

Doubles
- Career record: 49–34
- Career titles: 5 ITF
- Highest ranking: No. 450 (29 October 2012)

Team competitions
- Fed Cup: 24–14

Amy Bowtell (born 16 September 1993) is a former tennis player and former Irish number one. Her highest WTA singles ranking is No. 381. Bowtell won ten professional titles, five singles and five doubles titles on the ITF Women's Circuit. She has been a member of Ireland Fed Cup team since 2009.

== Personal life ==
Bowtell grew up playing in Greystones Lawn Tennis Club in County Wicklow. Bowtell is currently coached by Garry Cahill.

== Career highlights ==
To date, Amy has reached seven ITF finals in singles, her first being a $10k tournament held in Chiswick, England on 1 August 2010. In the final, Amy lost to Tara Moore 3–6, 4–6. On 19 February 2012, she won her first ITF title, winning a $10k tournament held in Tallinn, Estonia against Polina Vinogradova 7–6, 6–4. She won her second title in April 2014, winning another $10,000 tournament, this time in Sharm El Sheikh, Egypt.

== ITF Circuit finals ==
=== Singles: 10 (5 titles, 5 runner–ups) ===
Legend $25,000 tournaments $10,000 tournaments	Finals by surface Hard (5–4) Carpet (0–1)

Result	W–L	Date	Tournament	Date	Surface	Opponent	Score
Loss	0–1	Aug 2010	ITF Chiswick, Great Britain	10,000	Hard	(United Kingdom) Tara Moore	3–6, 4–6
Loss	0–2	Jan 2012	ITF Sutton, Great Britain	10,000	Hard (i)	(Netherlands) Richèl Hogenkamp	3–6, 2–6
Win	1–2	Feb 2012	ITF Tallinn, Estonia	10,000	Hard (i)	(Russia) Polina Vinogradova	7–6^{(5)}, 6–4
Loss	1–3	Jan 2013	ITF Preston, Great Britain	10,000	Hard (i)	(United Kingdom) Tara Moore	6–7, 1–6
Loss	1–4	Apr 2013	ITF Heraklion, Greece	10,000	Carpet	(Greece) Valentini Grammatikopoulou	3–6, 4–6
Win	2–4	Apr 2014	ITF Sharm El Sheikh, Egypt	10,000	Hard	(United Kingdom) Katie Boulter	6–7^{(5)}, 6–0, 7–6^{(6)}
Loss	2–5	Jun 2014	ITF Sharm El Sheikh, Egypt	10,000	Hard	(Romania) Elena-Teodora Cadar	3–6, 3–6
Win	3–5	Oct 2014	ITF Loughborough, Great Britain	10,000	Hard (i)	(France) Shérazad Reix	6–7, 6–1, 7–6
Win	4–5	Nov 2014	ITF Helsinki, Finland	10,000	Hard (i)	(Switzerland) Tess Sugnaux	6–2, 6–3
Win	5–5	Feb 2015	ITF Sunderland, Great Britain	10,000	Hard (i)	(Russia) Marta Sirotkina	6–4, 6–3

=== Doubles: 8 (5 titles, 3 runner–ups) ===
Legend $25,000 tournaments $15,000 tournaments $10,000 tournaments	Finals by surface Hard (4–2) Clay (0–1) Carpet (1–0)

Result	W–L	Date	Tournament	Tier	Surface	Partner	Opponents	Score
Win	1–0	Jun 2011	ITF Amarante, Portugal	10,000	Hard	(United Kingdom) Yasmin Clarke	(Austria) Katharina Negrin (France) Constance Sibille	6–2, 6–3
Win	2–0	Aug 2011	ITF Gijón, Spain	10,000	Hard	(United Kingdom) Lucy Brown	(United Kingdom) Amanda Carreras (Venezuela) Andrea Gámiz	w/o
Win	3–0	Jan 2012	ITF Sutton, Great Britain	10,000	Hard (i)	(Netherlands) Quirine Lemoine	(France) Elixane Lechemia (France) Irina Ramialison	7–6^{(5)}, 6–3
Win	4–0	Feb 2012	ITF Helsingborg, Sweden	10,000	Carpet (i)	(Netherlands) Quirine Lemoine	(Sweden) Matilda Hamlin (Sweden) Valeria Osadchenko	6–3, 6–4
Loss	4–1	Apr 2012	ITF Bournemouth, Great Britain	10,000	Clay	(United Kingdom) Lucy Brown	(Germany) Carolin Daniels (Germany) Dejana Raickovic	4–6, 3–6
Win	5–1	Aug 2012	ITF Middelkerke, Belgium	10,000	Hard	(United Kingdom) Samantha Murray	(Belgium) Steffi Distelmans (Belgium) Magali Kempen	6–3, 6–3
Loss	5–2	Mar 2013	ITF Sunderland, Great Britain	15,000	Hard (i)	(United Kingdom) Lucy Brown	(Sweden) Hilda Melander (Sweden) Sandra Roma	0–6, 3–6
Loss	5–3	Oct 2014	ITF Loughborough, Great Britain	10,000	Hard (i)	(United Kingdom) Lucy Brown	(Czech Republic) Martina Borecká (France) Shérazad Reix	3–6, 2–6

== Fed Cup performance ==
=== Singles (11–8) ===
Edition	Round	Date	Against	Surface	Opponent	W/L	Result
2009 Europe/Africa Zone	RR	21 April 2009	Algeria	Hard	(Algeria) Amira Benaissa	Win	1–6, 6–2, 6–1
2009 Europe/Africa Zone	RR	22 April 2009	Greece	Hard	(Greece) Eleni Daniilidou	Loss	2–6, 2–6
2009 Europe/Africa Zone	RR	23 April 2009	Finland	Hard	(Finland) Piia Suomalainen	Loss	5–7, 4–6
2009 Europe/Africa Zone	RR	25 April 2009	Malta	Hard	(Malta) Stephanie Sullivan	Win	6–4, 6–1
2010 Europe/Africa Zone	RR	22 April 2010	Malta	Clay	(Malta) Elaine Genovese	Win	6–3, 2–6, 6–3
2010 Europe/Africa Zone	RR	22 April 2010	Morocco	Clay	(Morocco) Nadia Lalami	Loss	2–6, 0–6
2010 Europe/Africa Zone	RR	23 April 2010	Algeria	Clay	(Algeria) Assia Halo	Loss	6–0, 6–7^{(5–7)}, 1–6
2011 Europe/Africa Zone	RR	2 May 2011	Moldova	Clay	(Moldova) Daniela Ciobanu	Win	6–0, 6–2
2011 Europe/Africa Zone	RR	3 May 2011	Norway	Clay	(Norway) Emma Flood	Win	6–2, 6–2
2011 Europe/Africa Zone	RR	4 May 2011	Egypt	Clay	(Egypt) Aziz Magy	Win	6–4, 6–3
2011 Europe/Africa Zone	RR	6 May 2011	Tunisia	Clay	(Tunisia) Ons Jabeur	Loss	2–6, 3–6
2012 Europe/Africa Zone	RR	16 April 2012	Malta	Clay	(Malta) Rosanne Dimech	Win	6–0, 6–2
2012 Europe/Africa Zone	RR	18 April 2012	Morocco	Clay	(Morocco) Nadia Lalami	Loss	5–7, 1–6
2012 Europe/Africa Zone	RR	19 April 2012	Armenia	Clay	(Armenia) Ani Amiraghyan	Loss	4–6, 4–6
2012 Europe/Africa Zone	RR	20 April 2012	Kenya	Clay	(Kenya) Veronica Nabwire Osogo	Win	6–0, 6–0
2012 Europe/Africa Zone	P/O	21 April 2012	Tunisia	Clay	(Tunisia) Ons Jabeur	Loss	3–6, 5–7
2014 Europe/Africa Zone Group 3	RR	5 February 2014	Iceland	Hard (i)	(Iceland) Hjördís Rósa Guðmundsdóttir	Win	6–1, 6–0
2014 Europe/Africa Zone Group 3	RR	7 February 2014	Malta	Hard (i)	(Malta) Katrina Sammut	Win	6–3, 6–0
2014 Europe/Africa Zone Group 3	P/O	8 February 2014	Greece	Hard (i)	(Greece) Maria Sakkari	Win	4–6, 6–3, 6–2

=== Doubles (7–2) ===
Edition	Round	Date	Against	Surface	Partner	Opponents	W/L	Result
2010 Europe/Africa Zone	RR	21 April 2010	Malta	Clay	(Republic of Ireland) Julia Moriarty	(Malta) Kimberley Cassar (Malta) Elaine Genovese	Win	7–6^{(7–1)}, 6–2
2011 Europe/Africa Zone	RR	3 May 2011	Norway	Clay	(Republic of Ireland) Lynsey McCullough	(Norway) Ulrikke Eikeri (Norway) Caroline Rohde-Moe	Loss	1–6, 1–6
2011 Europe/Africa Zone	RR	6 May 2011	Tunisia	Clay	(Republic of Ireland) Lynsey McCullough	(Tunisia) Sonia Daggou (Tunisia) Ons Jabeur	Loss	2–6, 2–6
2012 Europe/Africa Zone	RR	19 April 2012	Armenia	Clay	(Republic of Ireland) Jenny Claffey	(Armenia) Ani Amiraghyan (Armenia) Anna Movsisyan	Win	6–1, 4–6, 6–3
2012 Europe/Africa Zone	RR	20 April 2012	Kenya	Clay	(Republic of Ireland) Lynsey McCullough	(Kenya) Caroline Oduor (Kenya) Michelle Kerubo Onyancha	Win	6–1, 6–0
2012 Europe/Africa Zone	P/O	21 April 2012	Tunisia	Clay	(Republic of Ireland) Jenny Claffey	(Tunisia) Ons Jabeur (Tunisia) Mouna Jebri	Win	6–1, 6–1
2014 Europe/Africa Zone Group 3	RR	5 February 2014	Iceland	Hard (i)	(Republic of Ireland) Rachael Dillon	(Iceland) Hjördís Rósa Guðmundsdóttir (Iceland) Sandra Kristjánsdóttir	Win	6–1, 6–1
2014 Europe/Africa Zone Group 3	RR	7 February 2014	Malta	Hard (i)	(Republic of Ireland) Rachael Dillon	(Malta) Rosanne Dimech (Malta) Elaine Genovese	Win	6–1, 6–1
2014 Europe/Africa Zone Group 3	P/O	8 February 2014	Greece	Hard (i)	(Republic of Ireland) Rachael Dillon	(Greece) Valentini Grammatikopoulou (Greece) Maria Sakkari	Win	6–4, 6–3
