= Lucy Brown (tennis) =

British tennis player

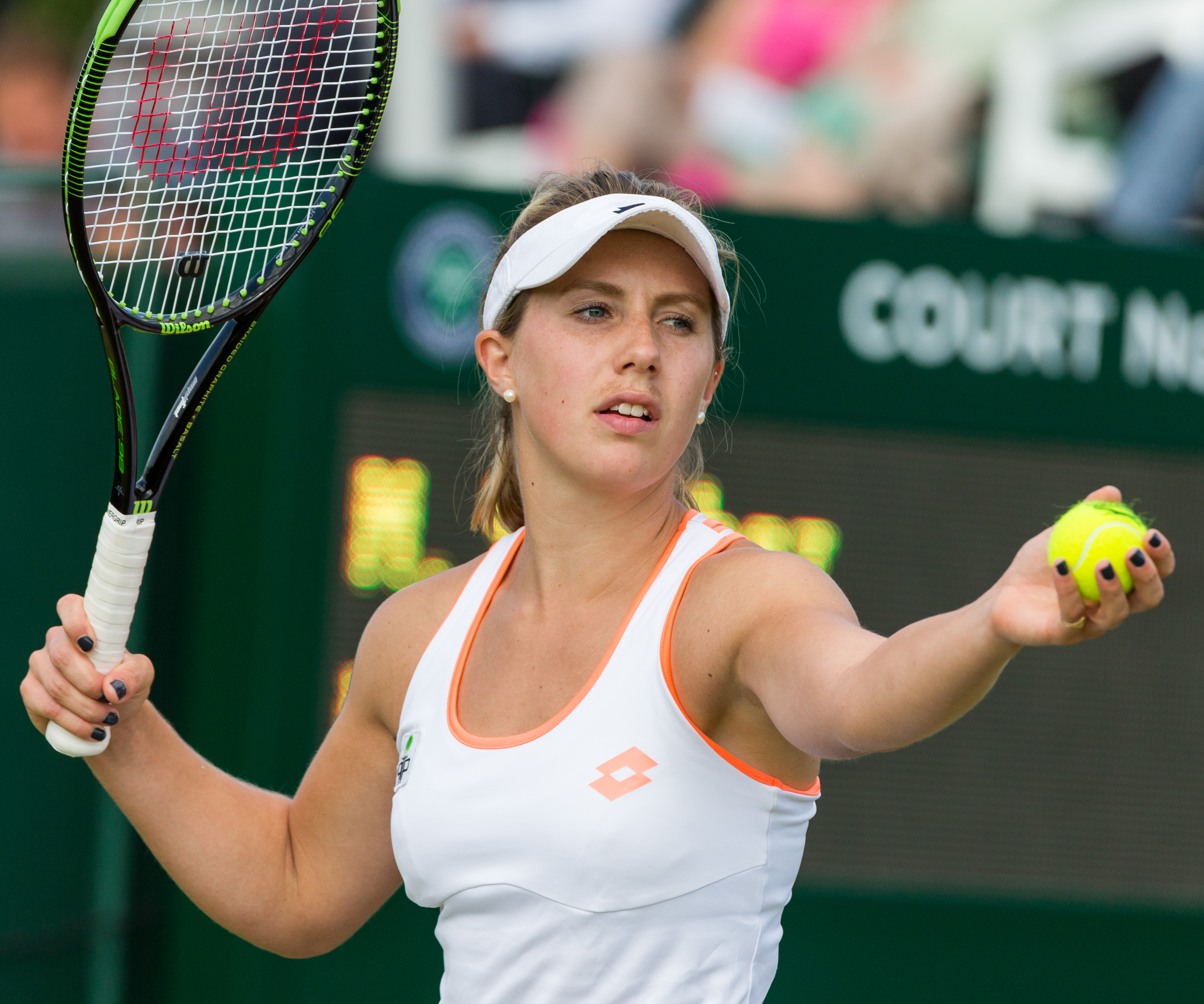
- Brown at the 2015 Wimbledon qualifying
- Country (sports): United Kingdom
- Born: 11 January 1993 (age 32)
- Turned pro: 2008
- Retired: 2016
- Plays: Right-handed
- Prize money: $41,803

Singles
- Career record: 98–116
- Career titles: 0
- Highest ranking: No. 540 (9 July 2012)

Doubles
- Career record: 79–69
- Career titles: 6 ITF
- Highest ranking: No. 397 (26 August 2013)

Lucy Brown (born 11 January 1993) is a former professional tennis player from the United Kingdom. On 9 July 2012, she reached her highest WTA singles ranking of 540.

== Tennis career ==
Brown's parents played tennis socially, and she began playing seriously when she was nine. She played in Oxfordshire, and trained at the LTA Academy in Loughborough and then the Bisham Abbey High Performance Centre. She then trained in Spain, and then at the National Tennis Centre in Roehampton, but her tennis training was a source of financial stress.

During her professional career, she won six doubles titles on the ITF Pro Circuit. In 2010, she played doubles at Wimbledon with her friend Laura Robson.

Injuries ended her professional career.

== Subsequent career ==
Brown is now the head coach at Cothill House, a boys' boarding school in Oxfordshire.
