= Linda Nosková career statistics =

Career finals
Discipline	Type	Won	Lost	Total
Singles	Grand Slam	1	0	1
Singles	WTA Finals	–	–	0
Singles	WTA 1000	–	1	1
Singles	WTA 500	2	2	4
Singles	WTA 250	–	2	2
Singles	Olympics	–	–	0
Singles	Total	3	5	8
Doubles	Grand Slam	–	–	0
Doubles	WTA Finals	–	–	0
Doubles	WTA 1000	1	0	1
Doubles	WTA 500	1	1	2
Doubles	WTA 250	–	1	1
Doubles	Olympics	–	–	0
Doubles	Total	2	2	4

This is a list of career statistics of Czech tennis player Linda Nosková since her professional debut in 2019. Nosková has won three singles titles and two doubles titles on the WTA Tour, plus a major title at the 2026 Wimbledon Championships.

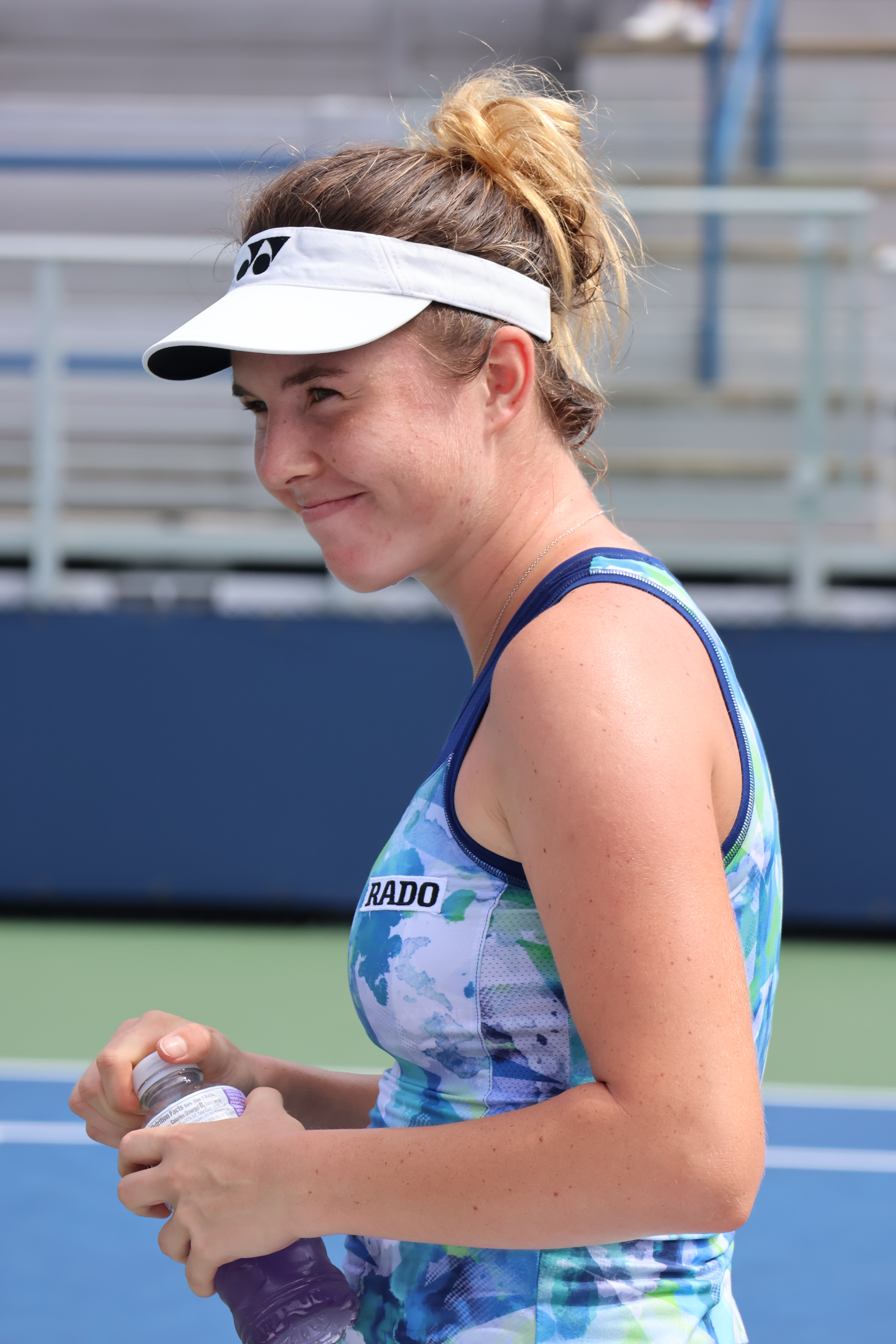
Czech player Linda Nosková at the 2023 US Open

== Performance timelines ==
Key
W	F	SF	QF	#R	RR	Q#	P#	DNQ	A	Z#	PO	G	S	B	NMS	NTI	P	NH

(W) winner; (F) finalist; (SF) semifinalist; (QF) quarterfinalist; (#R) rounds 4, 3, 2, 1; (RR) round-robin stage; (Q#) qualification round; (P#) preliminary round; (DNQ) did not qualify; (A) absent; (Z#) Davis/Fed Cup Zonal Group (with number indication) or (PO) play-off; (G) gold, (S) silver or (B) bronze Olympic/Paralympic medal; (NMS) not a Masters tournament; (NTI) not a Tier I tournament; (P) postponed; (NH) not held; (SR) strike rate (events won / competed); (W–L) win–loss record.
To avoid confusion and double counting, these charts are updated at the conclusion of a tournament or when the player's participation has ended.

Only main-draw results in WTA Tour, Grand Slam tournaments, Billie Jean King Cup, United Cup, Hopman Cup and Olympic Games are included in win–loss records.

=== Singles ===
Current through the 2026 WTA Finals.

Tournament	2022	2023	2024	2025	2026	SR	W–L	Win%
Grand Slam tournaments
Australian Open	A	Q1	QF	1R	3R	0 / 3	6–3	67%
French Open	1R	2R	2R	1R	1R	0 / 5	2–5	29%
Wimbledon	A	1R	2R	4R	W	1 / 4	11–3	79%
US Open	1R	2R	1R	3R	QF	0 / 5	7–5	58%
Win–Loss	0–2	2–3	6–4	5–4	13–3	1 / 17	26–16	62%
Year-end championship
WTA Finals	DNQ				SF	0 / 1	2–2	50%
National representation
Billie Jean King Cup	A	SF	A	F_{QR}	W	1 / 2	9–2	82%
Summer Olympics	NH		1R	NH		0 / 1	0–1	0%
WTA 1000 tournaments
Qatar Open	A	NTI	3R	3R	2R	0 / 3	5–3	63%
Dubai Championships	NTI	A	A	QF	2R	0 / 2	4–2	67%
Indian Wells Open	A	3R	3R	2R	SF	0 / 4	7–4	64%
Miami Open	A	2R	3R	2R	3R	0 / 4	2–4	33%
Madrid Open	A	A	2R	3R	QF	0 / 3	3–3	50%
Italian Open	A	2R	3R	3R	4R	0 / 4	5–4	56%
Canadian Open	A	A	A	2R	2R	0 / 2	0–2	0%
Cincinnati Open	A	3R	1R	2R	4R	0 / 4	4–4	50%
China Open	NH	2R (Note: Withdrawal during the tournament not counted as a loss.)	A	F	4R	0 / 3	8–2	80%
Wuhan Open	NH		A	3R	A	0 / 1	2–1	67%
Win–Loss	0–0	6–4	5–6	14–10	14–9	0 / 30	39–29	57%
Career statistics
	2022	2023	2024	2025	2026	SR	W–L	Win%
Tournaments	4	17	18	25	18	Career total: 82		
Titles	0	0	1	0	2	Career total: 3		
Finals	0	2	1	3	2	Career total: 8		
Hard win–loss	4–3	21–11	17–9	29–18	24–12	1 / 52	95–53	64%
Clay win–loss	0–1	2–2	6–6	3–5	6–4	0 / 18	17–18	49%
Grass win–loss	0–0	1–3	3–3	8–3	12–1	2 / 12	24–10	71%
Overall win–loss	4–4	24–16	26–18	40–26	42–17	3 / 82	136–81	63%
Win %	50%	60%	59%	61%	71%	Career total: 63%		
Year-end ranking	91	41	26	13		$12,166,903		

=== Doubles ===
Current through the 2026 Wuhan Open.

Tournament	2022	2023	2024	2025	2026	SR	W–L	Win%
Grand Slam tournaments
Australian Open	A	A	2R	1R	1R	0 / 3	1–3	25%
French Open	A	2R	2R	1R	1R	0 / 4	2–4	33%
Wimbledon	A	1R	1R	1R	3R	0 / 4	2–4	33%
US Open	2R	2R	1R	1R	1R	0 / 5	2–5	29%
Win–Loss	1–1	2–3	2–4	0–4	2–4	0 / 16	7–16	30%
National representation
Summer Olympics	Not Held		4th	Not Held		0 / 1	3–2	60%
WTA 1000 tournaments
Qatar Open	A	NTI	2R	1R	1R	0 / 3	0–3	0%
Dubai Championships	NTI	A	A	QF	A	0 / 1	2–1	67%
Indian Wells Open	A	A	1R	A	1R	0 / 2	0–2	0%
Miami Open	A	A	2R	1R	1R	0 / 3	1–3	25%
Madrid Open	A	A	1R	QF	2R	0 / 3	3–3	50%
Italian Open	A	A	1R	1R	QF	0 / 3	1–3	25%
Canadian Open	A	A	A	1R	1R	0 / 2	0–2	0%
Cincinnati Open	A	A	SF	QF	W	1 / 3	10–2	83%
China Open	NH	A	A	1R	1R	0 / 2	0–2	0%
Wuhan Open	Not Held		A	QF	A	0 / 1	1–1	50%
Win–Loss	0–0	0–0	4–6	7–9	7–7	1 / 23	18–22	45%
Career statistics
	2022	2023	2024	2025	2026	SR	W–L	Win%
Tournaments	3	5	14	19	15	Career total: 55		
Titles	0	0	0	0	2	Career total: 2		
Finals	0	0	1	1	2	Career total: 4		
Hard win–loss	2–3	3–2	7–8	8–13	5–8	1 / 34	25–34	42%
Clay win–loss	0–0	1–1	4–5	5–5	2–4	0 / 14	12–15	44%
Grass win–loss	0–0	1–2	1–2	0–1	6–1	1 / 7	8–6	57%
Overall win–loss	2–3	5–5	12–15	13–19	13–13	2 / 55	45–55	45%
Win %	40%	50%	44%	41%	50%	Career total: 45%		
Year-end ranking	180	198	65	65				

== Grand Slam tournaments finals ==
=== Singles: 1 title ===
Result	Year	Tournament	Surface	Opponent	Score
Win	2026	Wimbledon	Grass	(Czech Republic) Karolína Muchová	6–2, 5–7, 6–3

== Other significant finals ==
=== WTA 1000 tournaments ===
==== Singles: 1 runner-up ====
Result	Year	Tournament	Surface	Opponent	Score
Loss	2025	China Open	Hard	(United States) Amanda Anisimova	0–6, 6–2, 2–6

==== Doubles: 1 title ====
Result	Year	Tournament	Surface	Partner	Opponents	Score
Win	2026	Cincinnati Open	Hard	(Czech Republic) Marie Bouzková	(Belgium) Magali Kempen; Alexandra Panova	6–1, 6–2

=== Summer Olympics ===
==== Doubles: 1 (4th place) ====
Result	Year	Tournament	Surface	Partner	Opponents	Score
4th place	2024	Paris Olympics, France	Clay	(Czech Republic) Karolína Muchová	(Spain) Cristina Bucșa (Spain) Sara Sorribes Tormo	2–6, 2–6

== WTA Tour finals ==
=== Singles: 8 (3 titles, 5 runner-ups) ===
Legend Grand Slam (1–0) WTA 1000 (0–1) WTA 500 (2–2) WTA 250 (0–2)	Finals by surface Hard (1–5) Grass (2–0)	Finals by setting Outdoor (3–5)

Result	W–L	Date	Tournament	Tier	Surface	Opponent	Score
Loss	0–1	Jan 2023	Adelaide International, Australia	WTA 500	Hard	Aryna Sabalenka	3–6, 6–7^{(4–7)}
Loss	0–2	Aug 2023	Prague Open, Czech Republic	WTA 250	Hard	(Japan) Nao Hibino	4–6, 1–6
Win	1–2	Aug 2024	Monterrey Open, Mexico	WTA 500	Hard	(New Zealand) Lulu Sun	7–6^{(8–6)}, 6–4
Loss	1–3	Jul 2025	Prague Open, Czech Republic	WTA 250	Hard	(Czech Republic) Marie Bouzková	6–2, 1–6, 3–6
Loss	1–4	Oct 2025	China Open, China	WTA 1000	Hard	(United States) Amanda Anisimova	0–6, 6–2, 2–6
Loss	1–5	Oct 2025	Pan Pacific Open, Japan	WTA 500	Hard	(Switzerland) Belinda Bencic	2–6, 3–6
Win	2–5	Jun 2026	Berlin Open, Germany	WTA 500	Grass	(United States) Jessica Pegula	6–4, 4–6, 6–3
Win	3–5	Jul 2026	Wimbledon, United Kingdom	Grand Slam	Grass	(Czech Republic) Karolína Muchová	6–2, 5–7, 6–3

=== Doubles: 4 (2 titles, 2 runner-ups) ===
Legend WTA 1000 (1–0) WTA 500 (1–1) WTA 250 (0–1)	Finals by surface Hard (1–1) Clay (0–1) Grass (1–0)	Finals by setting Outdoor (2–1) Indoor (0–1)

Result	W–L	Date	Tournament	Tier	Surface	Partner	Opponents	Score
Loss	0–1	Feb 2024	Abu Dhabi Open, UAE	WTA 500	Hard	(United Kingdom) Heather Watson	(United States) Sofia Kenin (United States) Bethanie Mattek-Sands	4–6, 6–7^{(4–7)}
Loss	0–2	Apr 2025	Open de Rouen, France	WTA 250	Clay (i)	Irina Khromacheva	(Serbia) Aleksandra Krunić (United States) Sabrina Santamaria	0–6, 4–6
Win	1–2	Jun 2026	Berlin Open, Germany	WTA 500	Grass	Ekaterina Alexandrova	(Italy) Sara Errani (United States) Nicole Melichar-Martinez	6–2, 6–4
Win	2–2	Aug 2026	Cincinnati Open, US	WTA 1000	Hard	(Czech Republic) Marie Bouzková	(Belgium) Magali Kempen; Alexandra Panova	6–1, 6–2

== ITF Circuit finals ==
=== Singles: 7 (6 titles, 1 runner-up) ===
Legend W100 tournaments (1–0) W60 tournaments (2–0) W25 tournaments (1–0) W15 tournaments (2–1)	Finals by surface Hard (4–1) Clay (2–0)

Result	W–L	Date	Tournament	Tier	Surface	Opponent	Score
Loss	0–1	Feb 2021	ITF Sharm El Sheikh, Egypt	W15	Hard	(Belarus) Shalimar Talbi	3–6, 6–2, 3–6
Win	1–1	Mar 2021	ITF Bratislava, Slovakia	W15	Hard (i)	(Czech Republic) Tereza Smitková	4–6, 7–6^{(7–4)}, 7–5
Win	2–1	Mar 2021	ITF Bratislava, Slovakia	W15	Hard (i)	(Croatia) Iva Primorac	6–3, 7–6^{(7–4)}
Win	3–1	Aug 2021	Přerov Cup, Czech Republic	W60	Clay	(Romania) Alexandra Cadanțu-Ignatik	6–7^{(2–7)}, 6–4, 6–3
Win	4–1	Nov 2021	ITF Milovice, Czech Republic	W25	Hard (i)	(Czech Republic) Nikola Bartůňková	6–3, 6–4
Win	5–1	Apr 2022	Open de Seine-et-Marne, France	W60	Hard (i)	(France) Léolia Jeanjean	6–3, 6–4
Win	6–1	Jul 2022	Reinert Open Versmold, Germany	W100	Clay	(Belgium) Ysaline Bonaventure	6–1, 6–3

=== Doubles: 5 (1 title, 4 runner-ups) ===
Legend W60 tournaments (1–0) W25 tournaments (0–4)	Finals by surface Hard (1–4)

Result	W–L	Date	Tournament	Tier	Surface	Partner	Opponents	Score
Loss	0–1	Oct 2021	ITF Netanya, Israel	W25	Hard	(Sweden) Fanny Östlund	(Israel) Lina Glushko (Israel) Shavit Kimchi	4–6, 2–6
Loss	0–2	Nov 2021	ITF Milovice, Czech Republic	W25	Hard (i)	(Poland) Maja Chwalińska	(Japan) Sakura Hosogi (Japan) Misaki Matsuda	6–3, 2–6, [8–10]
Loss	0–3	Jan 2022	ITF Manacor, Spain	W25	Hard	(Slovakia) Tereza Mihalíková	(Mexico) Fernanda Contreras (Spain) Andrea Lázaro García	1–6, 4–6
Loss	0–4	Feb 2022	ITF Manacor, Spain	W25	Hard	(Slovakia) Tereza Mihalíková	(Mexico) Fernanda Contreras (Spain) Andrea Lázaro García	1–6, 6–3, [6–10]
Win	1–4	Feb 2022	Nur-Sultan Challenger, Kazakhstan	W60	Hard (i)	(Russia) Ekaterina Makarova	(Czech Republic) Anna Sisková (Russia) Maria Timofeeva	6–2, 6–3

== ITF Junior Circuit ==
=== Junior Grand Slam finals ===
==== Singles: 1 title ====
Result	Year	Tournament	Surface	Opponent	Score
Win	2021	French Open	Clay	(Russia) Erika Andreeva	7–6^{(7–3)}, 6–3

=== ITF Junior Circuit finals ===
==== Singles: 5 (4 titles, 1 runner-up) ====
Legend
Grade A (1–0)
Grade 2 (3–1)

Result	W–L	Date	Tournament	Tier	Surface	Opponent	Score
Loss	0–1	May 2018	ITF Mödling, Austria	Grade 2	Clay	(Slovakia) Romana Čisovská	6–3, 6–7^{(3–7)}, 0–6
Win	1–1	Jun 2019	ITF Bytom, Poland	Grade 2	Clay	(Belarus) Evialina Laskevich	6–0, 6–2
Win	2–1	Aug 2019	ITF Székesfehérvár, Hungary	Grade 2	Clay	(Croatia) Antonia Ružić	6–3, 6–3
Win	3–1	Sep 2019	ITF Győr, Hungary	Grade 2	Clay	(France) Julie Belgraver	4–6, 7–6^{(8–6)}, 7–6^{(7–1)}
Win	4–1	Jun 2021	French Open, France	Grade A	Clay	(Russia) Erika Andreeva	7–6^{(7–3)}, 6–3

==== Doubles: 6 (3 titles, 3 runner-ups) ====
Legend
Grade 1/B1 (0–2)
Grade 2 (3–1)

Result	W–L	Date	Tournament	Tier	Surface	Partner	Opponents	Score
Win	1–0	Jun 2018	ITF Bytom, Poland	Grade 2	Clay	(Slovakia) Katarína Kužmová	(Russia) Nina Olyanovskaya (Russia) Valeriia Olianovskaia	6–4, 6–4
Loss	1–1	Aug 2018	ITF Budaörs, Hungary	Grade 2	Clay	(Slovakia) Romana Čisovská	(Russia) Polina Kudermetova (Russia) Daniella Medvedeva	6–1, 3–6, [9–11]
Loss	1–2	Mar 2019	ITF Villena, Spain	Grade 1	Clay	(Russia) Diana Shnaider	(Ukraine) Liubov Kostenko (Poland) Martyna Kubka	2–6, 3–6
Win	2–2	Jun 2019	ITF Bytom, Poland (2)	Grade 2	Clay	(Belarus) Evialina Laskevich	(Belarus) Jana Kolodynska (Russia) Daria Krasnova	6–1, 6–3
Win	3–2	Aug 2019	ITF Székesfehérvár, Hungary	Grade 2	Clay	(Belarus) Evialina Laskevich	(Slovenia) Živa Falkner (Slovenia) Pia Lovrič	6–1, 6–1
Loss	3–3	Jul 2021	ITF Klosters, Switzerland	Grade B1	Clay	(Russia) Diana Shnaider	(Germany) Mara Guth (Germany) Julia Middendorf	3–6, 6–3, [7–10]

== National representation ==
=== Billie Jean King Cup ===
Key
W	F	SF	QF	#R	RR	Q#	P#	DNQ	A	Z#	PO	G	S	B	NMS	NTI	P	NH

(W) winner; (F) finalist; (SF) semifinalist; (QF) quarterfinalist; (#R) rounds 4, 3, 2, 1; (RR) round-robin stage; (Q#) qualification round; (P#) preliminary round; (DNQ) did not qualify; (A) absent; (Z#) Davis/Fed Cup Zonal Group (with number indication) or (PO) play-off; (G) gold, (S) silver or (B) bronze Olympic/Paralympic medal; (NMS) not a Masters tournament; (NTI) not a Tier I tournament; (P) postponed; (NH) not held; (SR) strike rate (events won / competed); (W–L) win–loss record.
To avoid confusion and double counting, these charts are updated at the conclusion of a tournament or when the player's participation has ended.

Matches by group Finals (10–3)	Matches by round Rounds (4–1) Playoffs / Qualifying (6–2)	Matches by surface Hard (10–3) Clay (0–0)	Matches by type Singles (9–2) Doubles (1–1)	Matches by setting Indoors (9–3) Outdoors (0–0)	Matches by venue Czech Republic (1–2) Away (9–1)

- Nosková has a 9–2 record in ties, with:
  - 6 nominations
  - 10 ties played

Tier					Match					
Result	W–L	Date	Round	Surface	Result	W–L	Rubber	Type + Partner	Opponent nation	Opponent player(s)
Win (3–1)	1–0	Apr 2023	F QR	Clay	not played	—	V	Doubles (with Karolína Muchová)	Ukraine	Lyudmyla Kichenok; Dayana Yastremska
Win (3–0)	2–0	Nov 2023	F RR	Hard (i)	Win (7–6^{(7–2)}, 4–6, 6–4)	1–0	I	Singles	Switzerland	Céline Naef
Loss (1–2)	2–1	Nov 2024	F QF	Hard (i)	Loss (6–7^{(4–7)}, 6–4, 5–7)	1–1	II	Singles	Poland	Iga Świątek
Win (2–1)	3–1	Apr 2025	F QR	Hard (i)	Win (6–4, 6–0)	2–1	II	Singles	Brazil	Beatriz Haddad Maia
Win (2–1)	3–1	Apr 2025	F QR	Hard (i)	Loss (4–6, 6–7^{(4–7)})	2–2	III	Doubles (with Tereza Valentová	Brazil	Beatriz Haddad Maia; Luisa Stefani
Loss (1–2)	3–2	Apr 2025	F QR	Hard (i)	Loss (4–6, 2–6)	2–3	II	Singles	Spain	Jéssica Bouzas Maneiro
Win (3–0)	4–2	Nov 2025	F PO	Hard (i)	Win (6–2, 6–2)	3–3	II	Singles	Colombia	Camila Osorio
Win (2–1)	5–2	Nov 2025	F PO	Hard (i)	Win (7–5, 6–4)	4–3	II	Singles	Croatia	Antonia Ružić
Win (2–1)	5–2	Nov 2025	F PO	Hard (i)	Win (6–2, 3–6, 6–3)	5–3	III	Doubles (with Lucie Havlíčková)	Croatia	Jana Fett; Petra Marčinko
Win (3–2)	6–2	Apr 2026	F QR	Hard (i)	Win (6–1, 6–4)	6–3	II	Singles	Switzerland	Viktorija Golubic
Win (3–2)	6–2	Apr 2026	F QR	Hard (i)	Win (6–3, 3–6, 7–6^{(11–9)})	7–3	IV	Singles	Switzerland	Belinda Bencic
Win (2–0)	7–2	Sep 2026	F QF	Hard (i)	Win (6–2, 7–6^{(7–3)})	8–3	II	Singles	(United Kingdom) Great Britain	Katie Boulter
Win (2–0)	8–2	Sep 2026	F SF	Hard (i)	Win (7–6^{(7–5)}, 6–2)	9–3	II	Singles	Spain	Cristina Bucșa
Win (2–0)	9–2	Sep 2026	F F	Hard (i)	Win (6–3, 7–6^{(7–5)})	10–3	II	Singles	Ukraine	Elina Svitolina

- Key: (WG) world group; (F) finals; (PO) play-offs; (QR) qualifying round.

== WTA Tour career earnings ==
Current as of 10 August 2026.

Year	Grand Slam titles	WTA titles	Total titles	Earnings ($)	Money list rank
2019	–	–	–	2,076	1324
2020	–	–	–	12,110	395
2021	–	–	–	29,829	371
2022	–	–	–	228,717	167
2023	–	–	–	662,308	69
2024	–	1	1	1,356,921	35
2025	–	–	–	2,223,383	16
2026	1	3	4	6,232,657	1
Career	1	4	5	10,793,276	75

- Title counts include singles, doubles and mixed doubles titles.

== Wins against top 10 players ==
- Nosková has an 17–22 (44%) record against players who were, at the time the match was played, ranked in the top 10.

No.	Player	Rk	Event	Surface	Rd	Score	Rk	Years	Ref
1	Daria Kasatkina	8	Adelaide International, Australia	Hard	1R	6–3, 6–7^{(2–7)}, 6–3	102	2023	
2	(Tunisia) Ons Jabeur	2	Adelaide International, Australia	Hard	SF	6–3, 1–6, 6–3	102	2023	
3	(Czech Republic) Petra Kvitová	9	Cincinnati Open, US	Hard	2R	3–6, 6–2, 6–4	50	2023	
4	(Poland) Iga Świątek	1	Australian Open, Australia	Hard	3R	3–6, 6–3, 6–4	50	2024	
5	(Greece) Maria Sakkari	9	Qatar Open, Qatar	Hard	2R	3–6, 7–6^{(7–2)}, 7–5	28	2024	
6	(Latvia) Jeļena Ostapenko	10	Stuttgart Open, Germany	Clay (i)	1R	6–3, 6–1	31	2024	
7	(Spain) Paula Badosa	10	Abu Dhabi Open, UAE	Hard	2R	6–4, 6–1	39	2025	
8	(United States) Jessica Pegula	5	Dubai Championships, UAE	Hard	3R	6–3, 7–6^{(10–8)}	35	2025	
9	Mirra Andreeva	7	Bad Homburg Open, Germany	Grass	QF	6–3, 6–3	30	2025	
10	(China) Zheng Qinwen	9	China Open, China	Hard	3R	6–4, 3–6, 3–0 ret.	27	2025	
11	(United States) Jessica Pegula	7	China Open, China	Hard	SF	6–3, 1–6, 7–6^{(8–6)}	27	2025	
12	(United States) Coco Gauff	3	Madrid Open, Spain	Clay	4R	6–4, 1–6, 7–6^{(7–5)}	13	2026	
13	(United States) Jessica Pegula	4	German Open, Germany	Grass	F	6–4, 4–6, 6–3	13	2026	
14	(Czech Republic) Karolína Muchová	9	Wimbledon, United Kingdom	Grass	F	6–2, 5–7, 6–3	12	2026	
15	(Ukraine) Elina Svitolina	7	BJK Cup, China	Hard (i)	F	6–3, 7–6^{(7–5)}	6	2026	
16	(Ukraine) Marta Kostyuk	10	WTA Finals, Indian Wells	Hard	RR	6–2, 6–4	8	2026	
17	(United States) Coco Gauff	4	WTA Finals, Indian Wells	Hard	RR	6–3, 6–3	8	2026	

- Key: (Rk) first use, opponent rank; (Rd) round; (Rk) 2nd use, player rank; (Ref) reference; (F) final; (SF) semifinal; (QF) quarterfinal; (#R) rounds 4, 3, 2, 1; (RR) round-robin stage; (Q#) qualifying rounds or stages (3), 2, 1.

== Honors and awards ==
Award	Year	Category	Result	Ref.
Billie Jean King Cup Awards	2026	All-Star Team (Qualifiers)	Won	
