= 2015 Open GDF Suez Seine-et-Marne =

- Date: 30 March–5 April
- Edition: 3rd
- Category: ITF Women's Circuit
- Prize money: $50,000
- Surface: Hard (indoor)
- Location: Croissy-Beaubourg, France
- Venue: Ligue de Seine-et-Marne

Champions

Singles
- (Russia) Margarita Gasparyan

Doubles
- (United Kingdom) Jocelyn Rae / (United Kingdom) Anna Smith
← 2014 ·	Open GDF Suez Seine-et-Marne	· 2016 →

The 2015 Open GDF Suez Seine-et-Marne was a professional tennis tournament played on indoor hard courts. It was the third edition of the tournament which was part of the 2015 ITF Women's Circuit, offering a total of $50,000 in prize money. It took place in Croissy-Beaubourg, France, on 30 March – 5 April 2015.

== Women's singles entrants ==
=== Seeds ===
Country	Player	Rank^{1}	Seed
JPN	Misaki Doi	105	1
POL	Magda Linette	109	2
BEL	An-Sophie Mestach	114	3
ISR	Shahar Pe'er	116	4
NED	Richèl Hogenkamp	126	5
JPN	Misa Eguchi	131	6
CZE	Kristýna Plíšková	138	7
BLR	Olga Govortsova	140	8

- ^{1} Rankings as of 23 March 2015

=== Other entrants ===
The following players received wildcards into the singles main draw:

- (France) Manon Arcangioli
- (France) Myrtille Georges
- (France) Mathilde Johansson
- (France) Alizé Lim

The following players received entry from the qualifying draw:

- (Belgium) Ysaline Bonaventure
- (Serbia) Ivana Jorović
- (Bulgaria) Elitsa Kostova
- (Russia) Marina Melnikova

== Champions ==
=== Singles ===
- (Russia) Margarita Gasparyan def. (France) Mathilde Johansson, 6–3, 6–4

=== Doubles ===
- (United Kingdom) Jocelyn Rae / (United Kingdom) Anna Smith def. (France) Julie Coin / (France) Mathilde Johansson, 7–6^{(7–5)}, 7–6^{(7–2)}
