= 2022 Engie Open de Seine-et-Marne =

Tennis tournament

- Date: 28 March–3 April 2022
- Edition: 8th
- Category: ITF Women's World Tennis Tour
- Prize money: $60,000
- Surface: Hard / Indoor
- Location: Croissy-Beaubourg, France

Champions

Singles
- (Czech Republic) Linda Nosková

Doubles
- (Netherlands) Isabelle Haverlag / (Lithuania) Justina Mikulskytė
← 2019 ·	Open de Seine-et-Marne	· 2023 →

The 2022 Engie Open de Seine-et-Marne was a professional tennis tournament played on indoor hard courts. It was the eighth edition of the tournament which was part of the 2022 ITF Women's World Tennis Tour. It took place in Croissy-Beaubourg, France between 28 March and 3 April 2022.

== Singles main draw entrants ==
=== Seeds ===
Country	Player	Rank^{1}	Seed
FRA	Chloé Paquet	106	1
ESP	Cristina Bucșa	130	2
NED	Lesley Pattinama Kerkhove	138	3
UKR	Daria Snigur	139	4
~~FRA~~	~~Jessika Ponchet~~	~~190~~	~~5~~
	Oksana Selekhmeteva	206	6
BEL	Ysaline Bonaventure	207	7
ITA	Giulia Gatto-Monticone	213	8

- ^{1} Rankings are as of 21 March 2022.

=== Other entrants ===
The following players received wildcards into the singles main draw:

- (France) Audrey Albié
- (France) Manon Léonard
- (France) Mallaurie Noël
- (France) Marine Partaud

The following players received entry from the qualifying draw:

- Darya Astakhova
- (Germany) Mona Barthel
- (France) Flavie Brugnone
- (Turkey) Berfu Cengiz
- (Spain) Celia Cerviño Ruiz
- (France) Léolia Jeanjean
- (China) Lu Jingjing
- (Germany) Yana Morderger

The following player received entry as a lucky loser:

- (Italy) Martina Di Giuseppe

== Champions ==
=== Singles ===
- (Czech Republic) Linda Nosková def. (France) Léolia Jeanjean, 6–3, 6–4

=== Doubles ===
- (Netherlands) Isabelle Haverlag / (Lithuania) Justina Mikulskytė def. Sofya Lansere / Oksana Selekhmeteva, 6–4, 6–2
