= 2023 Open de Seine-et-Marne =

Tennis tournament

- Date: 27 March–2 April 2023
- Edition: 9th
- Category: ITF Women's World Tennis Tour
- Prize money: $60,000
- Surface: Hard / Indoor
- Location: Croissy-Beaubourg, France

Champions

Singles
- (United Kingdom) Jodie Burrage

Doubles
- (Belgium) Greet Minnen / (Belgium) Yanina Wickmayer
← 2022 ·	Open de Seine-et-Marne	· 2024 →

The 2023 Open de Seine-et-Marne was a professional tennis tournament played on indoor hard courts. It was the ninth edition of the tournament, which was part of the 2023 ITF Women's World Tennis Tour. It took place in Croissy-Beaubourg, France, between 27 March and 2 April 2023.

== Champions ==
=== Singles ===
- (United Kingdom) Jodie Burrage def. (Italy) Lucia Bronzetti, 3–6, 6–4, 6–0

=== Doubles ===
- (Belgium) Greet Minnen / (Belgium) Yanina Wickmayer def. (United Kingdom) Jodie Burrage / (Turkey) Berfu Cengiz, 6–4, 6–4

== Singles main draw entrants ==
=== Seeds ===
Country	Player	Rank	Seed
ITA	Lucia Bronzetti	73	1
BEL	Ysaline Bonaventure	85	2
FRA	Océane Dodin	93	3
GBR	Jodie Burrage	132	4
FRA	Jessika Ponchet	134	5
	Polina Kudermetova	140	6
	Oksana Selekhmeteva	156	7
GBR	Katie Boulter	157	8

- Rankings are as of 20 March 2023.

=== Other entrants ===
The following players received wildcards into the singles main draw:

- (France) Manon Léonard
- (France) Yasmine Mansouri
- Anastasia Pavlyuchenkova
- (France) Alice Tubello

The following players received entry from the qualifying draw:

- (United Kingdom) Emily Appleton
- Julia Avdeeva
- (United Kingdom) Anna Brogan
- (Italy) Federica Di Sarra
- (France) Amandine Hesse
- Sofya Lansere
- (France) Margaux Rouvroy
- Ksenia Zaytseva
