= 2014 Open GDF Suez Seine-et-Marne =

- Date: 24–30 March
- Edition: 2nd
- Category: ITF Women's Circuit
- Prize money: $50,000
- Surface: Hard (indoor)
- Location: Croissy-Beaubourg, France

Champions

Singles
- (France) Claire Feuerstein

Doubles
- (Russia) Margarita Gasparyan / (Ukraine) Lyudmyla Kichenok
← 2013 ·	Open GDF Suez Seine-et-Marne	· 2015 →

The 2014 Open GDF Suez Seine-et-Marne was a professional tennis tournament played on indoor hard courts. It was the second edition of the tournament and part of the 2014 ITF Women's Circuit, offering a total of $50,000 in prize money. It took place in Croissy-Beaubourg, France, on 24–30 March 2014.

== Singles main draw entrants ==
=== Seeds ===
Country	Player	Rank^{1}	Seed
SRB	Vesna Dolonc	116	1
POL	Magda Linette	118	2
ITA	Nastassja Burnett	123	3
CZE	Kristýna Plíšková	130	4
FRA	Claire Feuerstein	138	5
TUN	Ons Jabeur	140	6
LIE	Stephanie Vogt	145	7
SWE	Sofia Arvidsson	146	8

- ^{1} Rankings as of 17 March 2014

=== Other entrants ===
The following players received wildcards into the singles main draw:

- (France) Alix Collombon
- (France) Océane Dodin
- (France) Myrtille Georges
- (Ukraine) Lyudmyla Kichenok

The following players received entry from the qualifying draw:

- (Russia) Elizaveta Kulichkova
- (Georgia (country)) Sofia Shapatava
- (Czech Republic) Tereza Smitková
- (Bosnia and Herzegovina) Jasmina Tinjić

== Champions ==
=== Singles ===
- (France) Claire Feuerstein def. (Czech Republic) Renata Voráčová 6–3, 4–6, 6–4

=== Doubles ===
- (Russia) Margarita Gasparyan / (Ukraine) Lyudmyla Kichenok def. (Germany) Kristina Barrois / (Greece) Eleni Daniilidou 6–2, 6–4
