= 2013 Open GDF Suez Seine-et-Marne =

- Date: 25–31 March
- Edition: 1st
- Category: ITF Women's Circuit
- Prize money: $50,000
- Surface: Hard (indoor)
- Location: Croissy-Beaubourg, France

Champions

Singles
- (United Kingdom) Anne Keothavong

Doubles
- (Germany) Anna-Lena Friedsam / (Belgium) Alison Van Uytvanck
| Open GDF Suez Seine-et-Marne | · 2014 → |

The 2013 Open GDF Suez Seine-et-Marne was a professional tennis tournament played on indoor hard courts. It was the first edition of the tournament which was part of the 2013 ITF Women's Circuit, offering a total of $50,000 in prize money. It took place in Croissy-Beaubourg, France, on 25–31 March 2013.

== Singles main draw entrants ==
=== Seeds ===
| Country | Player | Rank^{1} | Seed |
|---|---|---|---|
| FRA | Stéphanie Foretz Gacon | 110 | 1 |
| AUT | Yvonne Meusburger | 140 | 2 |
| UZB | Akgul Amanmuradova | 142 | 3 |
| TUR | Çağla Büyükakçay | 157 | 4 |
| SLO | Tadeja Majerič | 165 | 5 |
| ITA | Maria Elena Camerin | 172 | 6 |
| UKR | Maryna Zanevska | 173 | 7 |
| FRA | Aravane Rezaï | 178 | 8 |

- ^{1} Rankings are as of 18 March 2013

=== Other entrants ===
The following players received wildcards into the singles main draw:

- (France) Manon Arcangioli
- (France) Séverine Beltrame
- (France) Clothilde de Bernardi
- (France) Amandine Hesse

The following players received entry from the qualifying draw:

- (Romania) Cristina Dinu
- (Italy) Giulia Gatto-Monticone
- (Netherlands) Lesley Kerkhove
- (Latvia) Diāna Marcinkēviča

The following player received entry by a Junior Exempt:

- (Germany) Antonia Lottner

== Champions ==
=== Singles ===
- (United Kingdom) Anne Keothavong def. (Czech Republic) Sandra Záhlavová 7–6^{(7–3)}, 6–3

=== Doubles ===
- (Germany) Anna-Lena Friedsam / (Belgium) Alison Van Uytvanck def. (France) Stéphanie Foretz Gacon / (Czech Republic) Eva Hrdinová 6–3, 6–4
