= 2024 Open de Seine-et-Marne =

Tennis tournament

- Date: 25–31 March 2024
- Edition: 10th
- Category: ITF Women's World Tennis Tour
- Prize money: $60,000
- Surface: Hard / Indoor
- Location: Croissy-Beaubourg, France

Champions

Singles
- (United Kingdom) Lily Miyazaki

Doubles
- (France) Estelle Cascino / (Philippines) Alex Eala
← 2023 ·	Open de Seine-et-Marne	· 2025 →

The 2024 Open de Seine-et-Marne was a professional tennis tournament played on indoor hard courts. It was the tenth edition of the tournament, which was part of the 2024 ITF Women's World Tennis Tour. It took place in Croissy-Beaubourg, France, between 25 and 31 March 2024.

== Champions ==
=== Singles ===
- (United Kingdom) Lily Miyazaki def. (Germany) Mona Barthel, 6–4, 7–5

=== Doubles ===
- (France) Estelle Cascino / (Philippines) Alex Eala def. (United Kingdom) Maia Lumsden / (France) Jessika Ponchet, 7–5, 7–6^{(7–4)}

== Singles main draw entrants ==
=== Seeds ===
Country	Player	Rank	Seed
CHN	Bai Zhuoxuan	87	1
USA	Emina Bektas	103	2
AUS	Arina Rodionova	104	3
USA	Sachia Vickery	131	4
FRA	Jessika Ponchet	142	5
SUI	Céline Naef	147	6
AUS	Olivia Gadecki	149	7
GBR	Lily Miyazaki	164	8

- Rankings are as of 18 March 2024.

=== Other entrants ===
The following players received wildcards into the singles main draw:

- (France) Yaroslava Bartashevich
- (France) Émeline Dartron
- (France) Nina Radovanovic
- (Belgium) Alison Van Uytvanck

The following players received entry from the qualifying draw:

- (France) Audrey Albié
- (United Kingdom) Emily Appleton
- (United Kingdom) Sarah Beth Grey
- (Czech Republic) Linda Klimovičová
- (Latvia) Diāna Marcinkēviča
- (France) Diana Martynov
- (Germany) Tayisiya Morderger
- Elena Pridankina
