= 2023 Open de Seine-et-Marne – Doubles =

Doubles
- 2023 Open de Seine-et-Marne

Final
- Champions: (Belgium) Greet Minnen (Belgium) Yanina Wickmayer
- Runners-up: (United Kingdom) Jodie Burrage (Turkey) Berfu Cengiz
- Score: 6–4, 6–4

Events
Singles	Doubles
← 2022 ·	Open de Seine-et-Marne	· 2024 →

Isabelle Haverlag and Justina Mikulskytė were the defending champions but lost in the semifinals to Jodie Burrage and Berfu Cengiz.

Greet Minnen and Yanina Wickmayer won the title, defeating Burrage and Cengiz in the final, 6–4, 6–4.

== Seeds ==
1. (Belgium) Greet Minnen / (Belgium) Yanina Wickmayer (champions)
2. (France) Jessika Ponchet / (Czech Republic) Renata Voráčová (first round)
3. (United Kingdom) Freya Christie / (United Kingdom) Ali Collins (semifinals)
4. (Netherlands) Isabelle Haverlag / (Lithuania) Justina Mikulskytė (semifinals)

== Draw ==
=== Key ===
- Q = Qualifier
- WC = Wild card
- LL = Lucky loser
- Alt = Alternate
- SE = Special exempt
- PR = Protected ranking
- ITF = ITF entry
- JE = Junior exempt
- w/o = Walkover
- r = Retired
- d = Defaulted
- SR = Special ranking

First round
1	(Belgium) G Minnen (Belgium) Y Wickmayer	6	6
(Spain) L Cortez Llorca (France) L Nguyen Tan	4	2
(Greece) S Sakellaridi (United States) C Scholl	6	6
(France) J Belgraver (France) Y Mansouri	4	4
3	(United Kingdom) F Christie (United Kingdom) A Collins	7^{7}	7
(United Kingdom) E Appleton (Germany) J Lohoff	6^{5}	5
S Lansere; O Selekhmeteva	w/o
(France) M Rouvroy (France) A Tubello
(Argentina) A Chlpac (Luxembourg) M Weckerle	1	3
(France) E Jacquemot; P Kudermetova	6	6
(France) M Léonard (France) A Robbe	3	1
4	(Netherlands) I Haverlag (Lithuania) J Mikulskytė	6	6
(United Kingdom) J Burrage (Turkey) B Cengiz	6	6
(Netherlands) L Pattinama Kerkhove (Netherlands) B Schoofs	4	4
(Germany) T Morderger (Germany) Y Morderger	6	7
2	(France) J Ponchet (Czech Republic) R Voráčová	3	5

Quarterfinals
1	(Belgium) G Minnen (Belgium) Y Wickmayer	6	6
(Greece) S Sakellaridi (United States) C Scholl	4	4
3	(United Kingdom) F Christie (United Kingdom) A Collins	6^{0}	6	[10]
S Lansere; O Selekhmeteva	7^{7}	1	[2]
(France) E Jacquemot; P Kudermetova	2	5
4	(Netherlands) I Haverlag (Lithuania) J Mikulskytė	6	7
(United Kingdom) J Burrage (Turkey) B Cengiz	6	7
(Germany) T Morderger (Germany) Y Morderger	4	5

Semifinals
1	(Belgium) G Minnen (Belgium) Y Wickmayer	7	6
3	(United Kingdom) F Christie (United Kingdom) A Collins	5	2
4	(Netherlands) I Haverlag (Lithuania) J Mikulskytė	5	2
(United Kingdom) J Burrage (Turkey) B Cengiz	7	6

Final
1	(Belgium) G Minnen (Belgium) Y Wickmayer	6	6
(United Kingdom) J Burrage (Turkey) B Cengiz	4	4
