= 2022 Engie Open de Seine-et-Marne – Doubles =

Doubles
- 2022 Engie Open de Seine-et-Marne

Final
- Champions: (Netherlands) Isabelle Haverlag (Lithuania) Justina Mikulskytė
- Runners-up: Sofya Lansere; Oksana Selekhmeteva
- Score: 6–4, 6–2

Events
Singles	Doubles
← 2019 ·	Open de Seine-et-Marne	· 2023 →

Harriet Dart and Lesley Pattinama Kerkhove were the defending champions but Dart chose not to participate. Pattinama Kerkhove partnered alongside Bibiane Schoofs but lost in the quarterfinals to Marine Partaud and Ioana Loredana Roșca.

Isabelle Haverlag and Justina Mikulskytė won the title, defeating Sofya Lansere and Oksana Selekhmeteva in the final, 6–4, 6–2.

== Seeds ==
1. (France) Estelle Cascino / (France) Jessika Ponchet (withdrew)
2. (Switzerland) Xenia Knoll / (Romania) Andreea Mitu (semifinals)
3. (Germany) Mona Barthel / (United Kingdom) Eden Silva (first round)
4. (Spain) Cristina Bucșa / Alena Fomina-Klotz (first round)

== Draw ==
=== Key ===
- Q = Qualifier
- WC = Wild card
- LL = Lucky loser
- Alt = Alternate
- SE = Special exempt
- PR = Protected ranking
- ITF = ITF entry
- JE = Junior exempt
- w/o = Walkover
- r = Retired
- d = Defaulted
- SR = Special ranking

=== Draw ===
First round
Alt	(United States) C Scholl (Slovakia) I Vojčináková	1	1
(Netherlands) L Pattinama Kerkhove (Netherlands) B Schoofs	6	6
WC	(France) L Nguyen Tan (France) M Rouvroy	2	4
(France) M Partaud (Romania) IL Roșca	6	6
4	(Spain) C Bucșa; A Fomina-Klotz	3	6	[6]
(United Kingdom) E Appleton (United Kingdom) A Collins	6	2	[10]
S Lansere; O Selekhmeteva	7	7
(Turkey) B Cengiz; Y Hatouka	5	5
WC	(Germany) T Morderger (Germany) Y Morderger	7^{7}	6
WC	(France) A Droguet (France) L Jeanjean	6^{4}	2
(Netherlands) I Haverlag (Lithuania) J Mikulskytė	6	6
3	(Germany) M Barthel (United Kingdom) E Silva	4	3
(France) E Jacquemot (Bulgaria) I Shinikova	6	6
D Astakhova (Latvia) D Marcinkēviča	0	3
(China) Jin Lu (Croatia) T Mrdeža	0^{r}
2	(Switzerland) X Knoll (Romania) A Mitu	3

Quarterfinals
(Netherlands) L Pattinama Kerkhove (Netherlands) B Schoofs	3	7^{7}	[7]
(France) M Partaud (Romania) IL Roșca	6	6^{4}	[10]
(United Kingdom) E Appleton (United Kingdom) A Collins	3	1
S Lansere; O Selekhmeteva	6	6
WC	(Germany) T Morderger (Germany) Y Morderger	6	2	[8]
(Netherlands) I Haverlag (Lithuania) J Mikulskytė	1	6	[10]
(France) E Jacquemot (Bulgaria) I Shinikova	2	4
2	(Switzerland) X Knoll (Romania) A Mitu	6	6

Semifinals
(France) M Partaud (Romania) IL Roșca	3	2
S Lansere; O Selekhmeteva	6	6
(Netherlands) I Haverlag (Lithuania) J Mikulskytė	7	6
2	(Switzerland) X Knoll (Romania) A Mitu	5	4

Final
S Lansere; O Selekhmeteva	4	2
(Netherlands) I Haverlag (Lithuania) J Mikulskytė	6	6
