= 2024 Open de Seine-et-Marne – Doubles =

Doubles
- 2024 Open de Seine-et-Marne

Final
- Champions: (France) Estelle Cascino (Philippines) Alex Eala
- Runners-up: (United Kingdom) Maia Lumsden (France) Jessika Ponchet
- Score: 7–5, 7–6^{(7–4)}

Events
Singles	Doubles
← 2023 ·	Open de Seine-et-Marne	· 2025 →

Greet Minnen and Yanina Wickmayer were the defending champions but chose not to participate.

Estelle Cascino and Alex Eala won the title, defeating Maia Lumsden and Jessika Ponchet in the final, 7–5, 7–6^{(7–4)}. Eala became the first Asian player to win the title in any event in the Open de Seine-et-Marne.

== Seeds ==
1. (United Kingdom) Maia Lumsden / (France) Jessika Ponchet (final)
2. (United Kingdom) Emily Appleton / (Netherlands) Isabelle Haverlag (quarterfinals)
3. (Greece) Valentini Grammatikopoulou / Elena Pridankina (quarterfinals)
4. (United Kingdom) Sarah Beth Grey / (United Kingdom) Eden Silva (quarterfinals)

== Draw ==
Key

- Q = Qualifier
- WC = Wild card
- LL = Lucky loser
- Alt = Alternate
- ITF = ITF entry
- PR = Protected ranking
- SR = Special ranking
- SE = Special exempt
- JE = Junior exempt
- JR = Junior Accelerator Programme entrant
- CO = College Accelerator Programme entrant
- NG = Next Gen Accelerator Program entrant
- w/o = Walkover
- r = Retired
- d = Defaulted

First round
(France) E Mazzoni (France) J Mazzoni	1	1
(France) D Martynov (France) M Szostak	6	6
4	(United Kingdom) SB Grey (United Kingdom) E Silva	6	6^{6}	[13]
(Germany) T Morderger (Germany) Y Morderger	2	7^{8}	[11]
(France) A Monnot; E Yashina	0	3
(United States) C Corley (United States) I Corley	6	6
(France) M Léonard (France) A Robbe	5	6	[2]
K Pavlova (Luxembourg) M Weckerle	7	1	[10]
(Latvia) D Marcinkēviča (Lithuania) J Mikulskytė	4	2
3	(Greece) V Grammatikopoulou; E Pridankina	6	6
(Switzerland) C Naef (India) P Thombare	7	2	[6]
(France) E Cascino (Philippines) A Eala	5	6	[10]
(France) H Bougouffa (Ukraine) M Kostiuk	1	1
2	(United Kingdom) E Appleton (Netherlands) I Haverlag	6	6

Quarterfinals
1	(United Kingdom) M Lumsden (France) J Ponchet	6	6
(France) D Martynov (France) M Szostak	4	2
4	(United Kingdom) SB Grey (United Kingdom) E Silva	4	3
(United States) C Corley (United States) I Corley	6	6
K Pavlova (Luxembourg) M Weckerle	6	4	[10]
3	(Greece) V Grammatikopoulou; E Pridankina	3	6	[8]
(France) E Cascino (Philippines) A Eala	6	6
2	(United Kingdom) E Appleton (Netherlands) I Haverlag	4	0

Semifinals
1	(United Kingdom) M Lumsden (France) J Ponchet	2	7	[10]
(United States) C Corley (United States) I Corley	6	5	[0]
K Pavlova (Luxembourg) M Weckerle	3	3
(France) E Cascino (Philippines) A Eala	6	6

Final
1	(United Kingdom) M Lumsden (France) J Ponchet	5	6^{4}
(France) E Cascino (Philippines) A Eala	7	7^{7}
