= 2014 Open GDF Suez Seine-et-Marne – Singles =

Singles
- 2014 Open GDF Suez Seine-et-Marne

Final
- Champion: (France) Claire Feuerstein
- Runner-up: (Czech Republic) Renata Voráčová
- Score: 6–3, 4–6, 6–4

Events
Singles	Doubles
← 2013 ·	Open GDF Suez Seine-et-Marne	· 2015 →

Anne Keothavong was the defending champion, but retired at the end of 2013.

Claire Feuerstein won the tournament, defeating Renata Voráčová in the final, 6–3, 4–6, 6–4.

== Seeds ==
1. (Serbia) Vesna Dolonc (first round; retired)
2. (Poland) Magda Linette (first round)
3. (Italy) Nastassja Burnett (first round)
4. (Czech Republic) Kristýna Plíšková (second round)
5. (France) Claire Feuerstein (champion)
6. (Tunisia) Ons Jabeur (quarterfinals)
7. (Liechtenstein) Stephanie Vogt (first round)
8. (Sweden) Sofia Arvidsson (first round)

== Main draw ==
=== Key ===
- Q = Qualifier
- WC = Wild card
- LL = Lucky loser
- Alt = Alternate
- SE = Special exempt
- PR = Protected ranking
- ITF = ITF entry
- JE = Junior exempt
- w/o = Walkover
- r = Retired
- d = Defaulted
- SR = Special ranking

=== Finals ===
Semifinals
5	(France) Claire Feuerstein	6	6
Q	(Czech Republic) Tereza Smitková	2	2
(Czech Republic) Kateřina Siniaková	4	6	2
(Czech Republic) Renata Voráčová	6	3	6

Final
5	(France) Claire Feuerstein	6	4	6
(Czech Republic) Renata Voráčová	3	6	4

=== Top half ===
First round
1	(Serbia) V Dolonc	3^{r}
WC	(Ukraine) L Kichenok	5
(France) P Parmentier	3	6	6^{4}
(Germany) C Witthöft	6	0	7^{7}
Q	(Bosnia and Herzegovina) J Tinjić	5	4
(Ukraine) K Kozlova	7	6
(Slovakia) K Kučová	5	3
5	(France) C Feuerstein	7	6
3	(Italy) N Burnett	6^{3}	6	3
(Serbia) A Krunić	7^{7}	3	6
(France) S Foretz Gacon	1	3
(Italy) A Brianti	6	6
(Russia) M Sirotkina	1	2
Q	(Czech Republic) T Smitková	6	6
(Turkey) Ç Büyükakçay	6	6
8	(Sweden) S Arvidsson	3	3

Second round
WC	(Ukraine) L Kichenok	6	6
(Germany) C Witthöft	4	4
(Ukraine) K Kozlova	3	4
5	(France) C Feuerstein	6	6
(Serbia) A Krunić	6	3	3
(Italy) A Brianti	2	6	6
Q	(Czech Republic) T Smitková	6	6
(Turkey) Ç Büyükakçay	3	3

Quarterfinals
WC	(Ukraine) L Kichenok	3	6^{2}
5	(France) C Feuerstein	6	7^{7}
(Italy) A Brianti	3	3
Q	(Czech Republic) T Smitková	6	6

Semifinals
5	(France) C Feuerstein	6	6
Q	(Czech Republic) T Smitková	2	2

=== Bottom half ===
First round
6	(Tunisia) O Jabeur	6	5	6
(Switzerland) V Golubic	3	7	2
Q	(Georgia (country)) S Shapatava	6	6
WC	(France) O Dodin	4	1
(Czech Republic) K Siniaková	6	6^{5}	6
(France) J Coin	3	7^{7}	4
WC	(France) A Collombon	4	5
4	(Czech Republic) Kr Plíšková	6	7
7	(Liechtenstein) S Vogt	3	6	4
(Poland) P Kania	6	3	6
(Russia) E Bychkova	4	6	6^{3}
WC	(France) M Georges	6	4	7
(Ukraine) Y Beygelzimer	0	6^{3}
(Czech Republic) R Voráčová	6	7^{7}
Q	(Russia) E Kulichkova	6	6
2	(Poland) M Linette	4	2

Second round
6	(Tunisia) O Jabeur	7^{7}	6
Q	(Georgia (country)) S Shapatava	6^{1}	3
(Czech Republic) K Siniaková	4	6	6
4	(Czech Republic) Kr Plíšková	6	1	0
(Poland) P Kania	4	6	5
WC	(France) M Georges	6	1	7
(Czech Republic) R Voráčová	6	2	6
Q	(Russia) E Kulichkova	2	6	4

Quarterfinals
6	(Tunisia) O Jabeur	4	6^{3}
(Czech Republic) K Siniaková	6	7^{7}
WC	(France) M Georges	3	2
(Czech Republic) R Voráčová	6	6

Semifinals
(Czech Republic) K Siniaková	4	6	2
(Czech Republic) R Voráčová	6	3	6
