= 2024 Open de Seine-et-Marne – Singles =

Singles
- 2024 Open de Seine-et-Marne

Final
- Champion: (United Kingdom) Lily Miyazaki
- Runner-up: (Germany) Mona Barthel
- Score: 6–4, 7–5

Events
Singles	Doubles
← 2023 ·	Open de Seine-et-Marne	· 2025 →

Jodie Burrage was the defending champion but chose not to participate.

Lily Miyazaki won the title, defeating Mona Barthel in the final, 6–4, 7–5.

== Seeds ==
1. (China) Bai Zhuoxuan (first round)
2. (United States) Emina Bektas (second round)
3. (Australia) Arina Rodionova (quarterfinals)
4. (United States) Sachia Vickery (first round)
5. (France) Jessika Ponchet (first round)
6. (Switzerland) Céline Naef (quarterfinals)
7. (Australia) Olivia Gadecki (first round)
8. (United Kingdom) Lily Miyazaki (champion)

== Draw ==
=== Key ===
- Q = Qualifier
- WC = Wild card
- LL = Lucky loser
- Alt = Alternate
- SE = Special exempt
- PR = Protected ranking
- ITF = ITF entry
- JE = Junior exempt
- w/o = Walkover
- r = Retired
- d = Defaulted
- SR = Special ranking

=== Finals ===
Semifinals
(France) Margaux Rouvroy	6	3	2
(Germany) Mona Barthel	4	6	6
8	(United Kingdom) Lily Miyazaki	6	1
(United Kingdom) Amarni Banks	3	1^{r}

Final
(Germany) Mona Barthel	4	5
8	(United Kingdom) Lily Miyazaki	6	7

=== Top half ===
First round
1	(China) Z Bai	6	5	5
(France) M Léonard	3	7	7
(Lithuania) J Mikulskytė	6	6^{6}	1
Q	(United Kingdom) E Appleton	2	7^{8}	6
(France) M Rouvroy	6	4	7
Q	E Pridankina	4	6	5
(Greece) V Grammatikopoulou	4	7^{7}	7
7	(Australia) O Gadecki	6	6^{2}	5
4	(United States) S Vickery	5	4
(Germany) M Barthel	7	6
(Philippines) A Eala	6	6
WC	(France) É Dartron	3	4
Q	(United Kingdom) SB Grey	3	3
WC	(Belgium) A Van Uytvanck	6	6
(Chinese Taipei) J Garland	3	6^{1}
6	(Switzerland) C Naef	6	7^{7}

Second round
(France) M Léonard	6	6
Q	(United Kingdom) E Appleton	1	2
(France) M Rouvroy	6	6
(Greece) V Grammatikopoulou	3	1
(Germany) M Barthel	4	6	6
(Philippines) A Eala	6	4	1
WC	(Belgium) A Van Uytvanck	2	1
6	(Switzerland) C Naef	6	6

Quarterfinals
(France) M Léonard	3	0
(France) M Rouvroy	6	6
(Germany) M Barthel	6	6^{4}	6
6	(Switzerland) C Naef	3	7^{7}	3

Semifinals
(France) M Rouvroy	6	3	2
(Germany) M Barthel	4	6	6

=== Bottom half ===
First round
8	(United Kingdom) L Miyazaki	5	7^{8}	6
Q	(Latvia) D Marcinkēviča	7	6^{6}	3
(France) A Robbe	4	3
(Switzerland) V Ryser	6	6
WC	(France) N Radovanovic	6	5	4
Q	(France) D Martynov	3	7	6
(Japan) H Sakatsume	6	2	3
3	(Australia) A Rodionova	1	6	6
5	(France) J Ponchet	7	6^{3}	3
Q	(France) A Albié	5	7^{7}	6
(France) K Mladenovic	4	2
Q	(Czech Republic) L Klimovičová	6	6
(United Kingdom) A Banks	6	7^{7}
Q	(Germany) T Morderger	1	6^{3}
WC	(France) Y Bartashevich	6	4	3
2	(United States) E Bektas	1	6	6

Second round
8	(United Kingdom) L Miyazaki	2	6	6
(Switzerland) V Ryser	6	4	4
Q	(France) D Martynov	4	5
3	(Australia) A Rodionova	6	7
Q	(France) A Albié	7	6
Q	(Czech Republic) L Klimovičová	5	4
(United Kingdom) A Banks	6	6
2	(United States) E Bektas	4	4

Quarterfinals
8	(United Kingdom) L Miyazaki	6	6
3	(Australia) A Rodionova	2	3
Q	(France) A Albié	4	2
(United Kingdom) A Banks	6	6

Semifinals
8	(United Kingdom) L Miyazaki	6	1
(United Kingdom) A Banks	3	1^{r}
