= 2013 Open GDF Suez Seine-et-Marne – Singles =

Singles
- 2013 Open GDF Suez Seine-et-Marne

Final
- Champion: (United Kingdom) Anne Keothavong
- Runner-up: (Czech Republic) Sandra Záhlavová
- Score: 7–6^{(7–3)}, 6–3

Events
Singles	Doubles
← 2012 ·	Open GDF Suez Seine-et-Marne	· 2014 →

This was a new event in 2013. Anne Keothavong won the title, defeating Sandra Záhlavová in the final, 7–6^{(7–3)}, 6–3.

== Seeds ==
1. (France) Stéphanie Foretz Gacon (semifinals)
2. (Austria) Yvonne Meusburger (second round)
3. (Uzbekistan) Akgul Amanmuradova (quarterfinals)
4. (Turkey) Çağla Büyükakçay (second round)
5. (Slovenia) Tadeja Majerič (second round, retired)
6. (Italy) Maria Elena Camerin (first round)
7. (Ukraine) Maryna Zanevska (quarterfinals)
8. (France) Aravane Rezaï (second round)

== Main draw ==
=== Key ===
- Q = Qualifier
- WC = Wild card
- LL = Lucky loser
- Alt = Alternate
- SE = Special exempt
- PR = Protected ranking
- ITF = ITF entry
- JE = Junior exempt
- w/o = Walkover
- r = Retired
- d = Defaulted
- SR = Special ranking

=== Finals ===
Semifinals
1	(France) Stéphanie Foretz Gacon	5	6	4
(Czech Republic) Sandra Záhlavová	7	3	6
(United Kingdom) Anne Keothavong	6	6
(France) Julie Coin	4	3

Final
(Czech Republic) Sandra Záhlavová	6^{3}	3
(United Kingdom) Anne Keothavong	7^{7}	6

=== Top half ===
First round
1	(France) S Foretz Gacon	7^{11}	6
Q	(Italy) G Gatto-Monticone	6^{9}	1
(Germany) A-L Friedsam	6	7
WC	(France) A Hesse	3	5
WC	(France) M Arcangioli	1	6^{4}
(Croatia) A Savić	6	7^{7}
Q	(Romania) C Dinu	6^{6}	6	4
5	(Slovenia) T Majerič	7^{8}	1	6
4	(Turkey) Ç Büyükakçay	4	6	6
(Netherlands) R Hogenkamp	6	4	2
(Czech Republic) S Záhlavová	6	6
(Belgium) A Van Uytvanck	2	3
WC	(France) C de Bernardi	5	2
(Croatia) A Vrljić	7	6
(Ukraine) O Savchuk	6^{4}	1
7	(Ukraine) M Zanevska	7^{7}	6

Second round
1	(France) S Foretz Gacon	6	7
(Germany) A-L Friedsam	4	5
(Croatia) A Savić	6	0
5	(Slovenia) T Majerič	2	0^{r}
4	(Turkey) Ç Büyükakçay	6	2	1
(Czech Republic) S Záhlavová	3	6	6
(Croatia) A Vrljić	5	6^{6}
7	(Ukraine) M Zanevska	7	7^{8}

Quarterfinals
1	(France) S Foretz Gacon	4	6	6
(Croatia) A Savić	6	4	1
(Czech Republic) S Záhlavová	6	2	6
7	(Ukraine) M Zanevska	4	6	2

Semifinals
1	(France) S Foretz Gacon	5	6	4
(Czech Republic) S Záhlavová	7	3	6

=== Bottom half ===
First round
6	(Italy) ME Camerin	3	2
(Italy) A Brianti	6	6
WC	(France) S Beltrame	2	6^{3}
(United Kingdom) A Keothavong	6	7^{7}
(Germany) A Schäfer	7^{7}	6^{8}	3
(Italy) C Dentoni	6^{2}	7^{10}	6
(Kazakhstan) Z Diyas	5	4
3	(Uzbekistan) A Amanmuradova	7	6
8	(France) A Rezaï	6	7^{9}
JE	(Germany) A Lottner	2	6^{7}
(Poland) P Kania	6^{3}	6^{2}
(France) J Coin	7^{7}	7^{7}
Q	(Netherlands) L Kerkhove	6	0	6
Q	(Latvia) D Marcinkēviča	2	6	3
(Russia) E Bychkova	6	6^{10}	0
2	(Austria) Y Meusburger	1	7^{12}	6

Second round
(Italy) A Brianti	2	2
(United Kingdom) A Keothavong	6	6
(Italy) C Dentoni	4	2
3	(Uzbekistan) A Amanmuradova	6	6
8	(France) A Rezaï	1	4
(France) J Coin	6	6
Q	(Netherlands) L Kerkhove	7^{10}	6
2	(Austria) Y Meusburger	6^{8}	4

Quarterfinals
(United Kingdom) A Keothavong	7^{7}	4	6
3	(Uzbekistan) A Amanmuradova	6^{5}	6	4
(France) J Coin	6	4	6
Q	(Netherlands) L Kerkhove	4	6	4

Semifinals
(United Kingdom) A Keothavong	6	6
(France) J Coin	4	3
