= 2015 Open GDF Suez Seine-et-Marne – Doubles =

Doubles
- 2015 Open GDF Suez Seine-et-Marne

Final
- Champions: (United Kingdom) Jocelyn Rae (United Kingdom) Anna Smith
- Runners-up: (France) Julie Coin (France) Mathilde Johansson
- Score: 7–6^{(7–5)}, 7–6^{(7–2)}

Events
Singles	Doubles
← 2014 ·	Open GDF Suez Seine-et-Marne	· 2016 →

Margarita Gasparyan and Lyudmyla Kichenok were the defending champions, however both players chose not to participate.

The top seeds, Jocelyn Rae and Anna Smith won the title, defeating wildcards Julie Coin and Mathilde Johansson in the final, 7–6^{(7–5)}, 7–6^{(7–2)}.

== Seeds ==
1. (United Kingdom) Jocelyn Rae / (United Kingdom) Anna Smith (champions)
2. (Japan) Misaki Doi / (Japan) Hiroko Kuwata (quarterfinals; withdrew)
3. (Argentina) Tatiana Búa / (Chile) Daniela Seguel (quarterfinals)
4. (Uzbekistan) Akgul Amanmuradova / (Ukraine) Nadiia Kichenok (quarterfinals)

== Draw ==
=== Key ===
- Q = Qualifier
- WC = Wild card
- LL = Lucky loser
- Alt = Alternate
- SE = Special exempt
- PR = Protected ranking
- ITF = ITF entry
- JE = Junior exempt
- w/o = Walkover
- r = Retired
- d = Defaulted
- SR = Special ranking

First round
1	(United Kingdom) J Rae (United Kingdom) A Smith	6	7^{7}
(Belgium) Y Bonaventure (Netherlands) D Schuurs	2	6^{2}
WC	(France) M Arcangioli (France) C Paquet	5	4
(Japan) E Hozumi (Japan) M Ninomiya	7	6
4	(Uzbekistan) A Amanmuradova (Ukraine) N Kichenok	7	7^{7}
(Bulgaria) E Kostova (Belarus) L Marozava	5	6^{5}
(United Kingdom) N Broady (Czech Republic) Kr Plíšková	6	4	[10]
(Russia) M Melnikova (Georgia (country)) S Shapatava	3	6	[8]
WC	(France) J Coin (France) M Johansson	6	2	[10]
(France) A Lim (France) L Thorpe	2	6	[5]
WC	(Russia) A Bukhanko (France) F Gervais	6	3	[6]
3	(Argentina) T Búa (Chile) D Seguel	4	6	[10]
(Romania) D Buzean (Austria) S Klemenschits	4	2
(France) S Foretz (Croatia) A Vrljić	6	6
(Japan) M Eguchi (Thailand) T Tanasugarn	6	4	[7]
2	(Japan) M Doi (Japan) H Kuwata	3	6	[10]

Quarterfinals
1	(United Kingdom) J Rae (United Kingdom) A Smith	6	4	[10]
(Japan) E Hozumi (Japan) M Ninomiya	3	6	[7]
4	(Uzbekistan) A Amanmuradova (Ukraine) N Kichenok	6^{7}	6^{2}
(United Kingdom) N Broady (Czech Republic) Kr Plíšková	7^{9}	7^{7}
WC	(France) J Coin (France) M Johansson	6	6
3	(Argentina) T Búa (Chile) D Seguel	2	1
(France) S Foretz (Croatia) A Vrljić	w/o
2	(Japan) M Doi (Japan) H Kuwata

Semifinals
1	(United Kingdom) J Rae (United Kingdom) A Smith	6	4	[10]
(United Kingdom) N Broady (Czech Republic) Kr Plíšková	2	6	[5]
WC	(France) J Coin (France) M Johansson	6	7
(France) S Foretz (Croatia) A Vrljić	2	5

Final
1	(United Kingdom) J Rae (United Kingdom) A Smith	7^{7}	7^{7}
WC	(France) J Coin (France) M Johansson	6^{5}	6^{2}
