= 2015 Open GDF Suez Seine-et-Marne – Singles =

Singles
- 2015 Open GDF Suez Seine-et-Marne

Final
- Champion: (Russia) Margarita Gasparyan
- Runner-up: (France) Mathilde Johansson
- Score: 6–3, 6–4

Events
Singles	Doubles
← 2014 ·	Open GDF Suez Seine-et-Marne	· 2016 →

Claire Feuerstein was the defending champion, however she chose not to participate.

Margarita Gasparyan won the title, defeating wildcard Mathilde Johansson in the final, 6–3, 6–4.

== Seeds ==
1. (Japan) Misaki Doi (first round)
2. (Poland) Magda Linette (first round)
3. (Belgium) An-Sophie Mestach (first round)
4. (Israel) Shahar Pe'er (first round)
5. (Netherlands) Richèl Hogenkamp (second round)
6. (Japan) Misa Eguchi (first round)
7. (Czech Republic) Kristýna Plíšková (quarterfinals)
8. (Belarus) Olga Govortsova (semifinals; retired)

== Main draw ==
=== Key ===
- Q = Qualifier
- WC = Wild card
- LL = Lucky loser
- Alt = Alternate
- SE = Special exempt
- PR = Protected ranking
- ITF = ITF entry
- JE = Junior exempt
- w/o = Walkover
- r = Retired
- d = Defaulted
- SR = Special ranking

=== Finals ===
Semifinals
(Ukraine) Yuliya Beygelzimer	3	5
WC	(France) Mathilde Johansson	6	7
(Russia) Margarita Gasparyan	6	5
8	(Belarus) Olga Govortsova	3	0^{r}

Final
WC	(France) Mathilde Johansson	3	4
(Russia) Margarita Gasparyan	6	6

=== Top half ===
First round
1	(Japan) M Doi	4	2
(Ukraine) Y Beygelzimer	6	6
(Belarus) A Sasnovich	7^{7}	3	4
(Croatia) P Martić	6^{5}	6	6
Q	(Russia) M Melnikova	1	1
(France) V Razzano	6	6
(Italy) A Brianti	6	6
6	(Japan) M Eguchi	4	4
4	(Israel) S Pe'er	2	1
WC	(France) M Johansson	6	6
(Russia) E Kulichkova	7	6^{4}	6
(United Kingdom) N Broady	5	7^{7}	3
WC	(France) M Georges	7^{7}	7^{7}
(Uzbekistan) N Abduraimova	6^{1}	6^{5}
(Japan) R Ozaki	4	1
5	(Netherlands) R Hogenkamp	6	6

Second round
(Ukraine) Y Beygelzimer	6	6
(Croatia) P Martić	4	4
(France) V Razzano	6	6
(Italy) A Brianti	1	1
WC	(France) M Johansson	7^{7}	3
(Russia) E Kulichkova	6^{4}	0^{r}
WC	(France) M Georges	6	3	6
5	(Netherlands) R Hogenkamp	1	6	1

Quarterfinals
(Ukraine) Y Beygelzimer	6	6
(France) V Razzano	4	2
WC	(France) M Johansson	7^{7}	6
WC	(France) M Georges	6^{5}	3

Semifinals
(Ukraine) Y Beygelzimer	3	5
WC	(France) M Johansson	6	7

=== Bottom half ===
First round
7	(Czech Republic) Kr Plíšková	4
(Japan) H Kuwata	2^{r}
(France) O Dodin	6	6
(Japan) E Hozumi	4	4
Q	(Serbia) I Jorović	1	6	5
(Russia) M Gasparyan	6	4	7
Q	(Bulgaria) E Kostova	6	3	6
3	(Belgium) A-S Mestach	4	6	4
8	(Belarus) O Govortsova	6	7
Q	(Belgium) Y Bonaventure	3	5
WC	(France) M Arcangioli	3	6	6^{4}
(France) S Foretz	6	4	7^{7}
(Russia) E Bychkova	3	6	6
WC	(France) A Lim	6	4	2
(Estonia) A Kontaveit	3	4
2	(Poland) M Linette	6	6

Second round
7	(Czech Republic) Kr Plíšková	6	6
(France) O Dodin	4	4
(Russia) M Gasparyan	6	6
Q	(Bulgaria) E Kostova	3	3
8	(Belarus) O Govortsova	6	6
(France) S Foretz	1	1
(Russia) E Bychkova	3	4
2	(Poland) M Linette	6	6

Quarterfinals
7	(Czech Republic) Kr Plíšková	6^{4}	5
(Russia) M Gasparyan	7^{7}	7
8	(Belarus) O Govortsova	6	6
2	(Poland) M Linette	2	4

Semifinals
(Russia) M Gasparyan	6	5
8	(Belarus) O Govortsova	3	0^{r}
