= 2024 Miami Open – Women's singles =

Women's singles
- 2024 Miami Open

Final
- Champion: (United States) Danielle Collins
- Runner-up: (Kazakhstan) Elena Rybakina
- Score: 7–5, 6–3

Details
- Draw: 96 (12 Q / 5 WC )
- Seeds: 32

Events
Singles	men	women
Doubles	men	women
- Miami Open

Danielle Collins defeated Elena Rybakina in the final, 7–5, 6–3 to win the women's singles tennis title at the 2024 Miami Open. It was her first WTA 1000 title, and her third WTA Tour title overall. Collins was the second unseeded woman to win the tournament, after Kim Clijsters in 2005. Ranked as the world No. 53, Collins was the lowest-ranked women's singles champion in the tournament's history, and the oldest first-time WTA 1000 champion since Elena Vesnina at the 2017 Indian Wells Open.

Petra Kvitová was the reigning champion, but did not participate due to pregnancy. This was the third consecutive year that the reigning champion did not defend the title, following Ashleigh Barty's withdrawal just before her professional retirement in 2022, and Iga Świątek's withdrawal due to injury in 2023.

Rybakina became the first woman to reach consecutive Miami Open finals since Serena Williams from 2013 to 2015.

This tournament marked the return to professional tennis of former world No. 1 Simona Halep. She lost to Paula Badosa in the first round. This was her first appearance since the 2022 US Open, following a suspension due to a doping violation.

This tournament marked the final professional appearance of Canadian Open champion Camila Giorgi, who later announced her retirement. She lost to Świątek in the second round.

== Seeds ==
All seeds received a bye into the second round.

1. (Poland) Iga Świątek (fourth round)
2. Aryna Sabalenka (third round)
3. (United States) Coco Gauff (fourth round)
4. (Kazakhstan) Elena Rybakina (final)
5. (United States) Jessica Pegula (quarterfinals)
6. (Tunisia) Ons Jabeur (second round)
7. (China) Zheng Qinwen (third round)
8. (Greece) Maria Sakkari (quarterfinals)
9. (Latvia) Jeļena Ostapenko (third round)
10. Daria Kasatkina (third round)
11. (Brazil) Beatriz Haddad Maia (third round)
12. (Italy) Jasmine Paolini (third round)
13. Liudmila Samsonova (second round)
14. Ekaterina Alexandrova (semifinals)
15. (Ukraine) Elina Svitolina (second round)
16. Veronika Kudermetova (second round)
17. (United States) Madison Keys (fourth round)
18. (Czech Republic) Barbora Krejčíková (withdrew)
19. (Romania) Sorana Cîrstea (fourth round)
20. (United States) Emma Navarro (fourth round)
21. Anastasia Pavlyuchenkova (third round)
22. Anna Kalinskaya (fourth round, withdrew)
23. (France) Caroline Garcia (quarterfinals)
24. (United Kingdom) Katie Boulter (fourth round)
25. (Belgium) Elise Mertens (second round)
26. (Czech Republic) Linda Nosková (third round)
27. Victoria Azarenka (semifinals)
28. (Ukraine) Dayana Yastremska (third round)
29. (Ukraine) Marta Kostyuk (withdrew)
30. Anastasia Potapova (second round)
31. (Canada) Leylah Fernandez (third round)
32. (Ukraine) Anhelina Kalinina (fourth round)

Click on the seed number of a player to go to their draw section.

== Draw ==
Key

- Q = Qualifier
- WC = Wild card
- LL = Lucky loser
- Alt = Alternate
- ITF = ITF entry
- PR = Protected ranking
- SR = Special ranking
- SE = Special exempt
- JE = Junior exempt
- JR = Junior Accelerator Programme entrant
- CO = College Accelerator Programme entrant
- NG = Next Gen Accelerator Program entrant
- w/o = Walkover
- r = Retired
- d = Defaulted

=== Finals ===
Quarterfinals
14	Ekaterina Alexandrova	3	6	6
5	(United States) Jessica Pegula	6	4	4
23	(France) Caroline Garcia	3	2
(United States) Danielle Collins	6	6
8	(Greece) Maria Sakkari	5	7^{7}	4
4	(Kazakhstan) Elena Rybakina	7	6^{4}	6
27	Victoria Azarenka	7^{7}	1	6
(Kazakhstan) Yulia Putintseva	6^{4}	6	3

Semifinals
14	Ekaterina Alexandrova	3	2
(United States) Danielle Collins	6	6
4	(Kazakhstan) Elena Rybakina	6	0	7^{7}
27	Victoria Azarenka	4	6	6^{2}

Final
(United States) Danielle Collins	7	6
4	(Kazakhstan) Elena Rybakina	5	3

=== Top half ===
==== Section 1 ====
First round
(Poland) M Fręch	4	2
(Italy) C Giorgi	6	6
(France) V Gracheva	3	3
Q	M Timofeeva	6	6
PR	(United States) S Rogers	4	6	6
WC	(Czech Republic) L Fruhvirtová	6	4	2
(Croatia) D Vekić	6	2	6
(Czech Republic) Ka Plíšková	4	6	2

Second round
1	(Poland) I Świątek	6	6
(Italy) C Giorgi	1	1
Q	M Timofeeva	4	4
26	(Czech Republic) L Nosková	6	6
21	A Pavlyuchenkova	6	6
PR	(United States) S Rogers	2	1
(Croatia) D Vekić	3	4
14	E Alexandrova	6	6

Third round
1	(Poland) I Świątek	6^{7}	6	6
26	(Czech Republic) L Nosková	7^{9}	4	4
21	A Pavlyuchenkova	4	6	3
14	E Alexandrova	6	3	6

Fourth round
1	(Poland) I Świątek	4	2
14	E Alexandrova	6	6

==== Section 2 ====
First round
Q	(United States) K Volynets	6	4	6
(United States) S Kenin	2	6	3
Q	(Australia) S Hunter	6	3
(Italy) M Trevisan	3	0^{r}
(Germany) T Maria	2	3
Q	(Colombia) E Arango	6	6
(Czech Republic) M Bouzková	2	4
(China) L Zhu	6	6

Second round
12	(Italy) J Paolini	7^{10}	7
Q	(United States) K Volynets	6^{8}	5
Q	(Australia) S Hunter	4	3
20	(United States) E Navarro	6	6
31	(Canada) L Fernandez	6	6
Q	(Colombia) E Arango	4	2
(China) L Zhu	4	1^{r}
5	(United States) J Pegula	6	4

Third round
12	(Italy) J Paolini	2	6	0
20	(United States) E Navarro	6	3	6
31	(Canada) L Fernandez	5	4
5	(United States) J Pegula	7	6

Fourth round
20	(United States) E Navarro	6^{1}	3
5	(United States) J Pegula	7^{7}	6

==== Section 3 ====
First round
Q	(Argentina) N Podoroska	6	6
(United States) A Krueger	4	2
(Spain) S Sorribes Tormo	0	3
(Netherlands) A Rus	6	6
(Bulgaria) V Tomova	6	6
LL	(Germany) T Korpatsch	2	4
(Italy) E Cocciaretto	3	4
PR	(Japan) N Osaka	6	6

Second round
3	(United States) C Gauff	6	6
Q	(Argentina) N Podoroska	1	2
(Netherlands) A Rus	4	6	3
LL	(France) O Dodin	6	3	6
23	(France) C Garcia	6	5
(Bulgaria) V Tomova	1	2^{r}
PR	(Japan) N Osaka	6	7^{7}
15	(Ukraine) E Svitolina	2	6^{5}

Third round
3	(United States) C Gauff	6	6
LL	(France) O Dodin	4	0
23	(France) C Garcia	7^{7}	7
PR	(Japan) N Osaka	6^{4}	5

Fourth round
3	(United States) C Gauff	3	6	2
23	(France) C Garcia	6	1	6

==== Section 4 ====
First round
Q	(United States) C Liu	6	6
(Croatia) P Martić	4	1
(United States) S Stephens	6	6
PR	(Germany) A Kerber	2	3
LL	(United States) B Pera	6	1	1
(United States) D Collins	3	6	6
E Avanesyan	6	3	6
WC	E Andreeva	0	6	1

Second round
10	D Kasatkina	6	1
Q	(United States) C Liu	0	0^{r}
(United States) S Stephens	2	1
19	(Romania) S Cîrstea	6	6
30	A Potapova	2	2
(United States) D Collins	6	6
E Avanesyan	6	4	6
6	(Tunisia) O Jabeur	1	6	3

Third round
10	D Kasatkina	5	2
19	(Romania) S Cîrstea	7	6
(United States) D Collins	6	6
E Avanesyan	1	2

Fourth round
19	(Romania) S Cîrstea	3	2
(United States) D Collins	6	6

=== Bottom half ===
==== Section 5 ====
First round
A Blinkova	4	2
(China) Y Yuan	6	6
PR	(Australia) D Saville	6	2	6
PR	(China) S Zhang	4	6	4
(China) Xiy Wang	6	6
Q	(Slovakia) AK Schmiedlová	1	3
Q	(Germany) L Siegemund	4	6	6
Q	(Serbia) A Krunić	6	2	2

Second round
8	(Greece) M Sakkari	6	6
(China) Y Yuan	2	2
PR	(Australia) D Saville	5	5
28	(Ukraine) D Yastremska	7	7
22	A Kalinskaya	6	6
(China) Xiy Wang	2	2
Q	(Germany) L Siegemund	6^{3}	4
9	(Latvia) J Ostapenko	7^{7}	6

Third round
8	(Greece) M Sakkari	7	6
28	(Ukraine) D Yastremska	5	4
22	A Kalinskaya	6	6
9	(Latvia) J Ostapenko	3	1

Fourth round
8	(Greece) M Sakkari	w/o
22	A Kalinskaya

==== Section 6 ====
First round
(China) Xin Wang	7^{7}	6
WC	(United States) H Baptiste	6^{1}	3
D Shnaider	6	6
WC	(United States) V Williams	3	3
(Italy) L Bronzetti	6	3	4
Q	(United States) T Townsend	3	6	6
(United States) C Dolehide	3	6	2
Q	(Denmark) C Tauson	6	3	6

Second round
16	V Kudermetova	3	2
(China) Xin Wang	6	6
D Shnaider	2	4
17	(United States) M Keys	6	6
25	(Belgium) E Mertens	2	2
Q	(United States) T Townsend	6	6
Q	(Denmark) C Tauson	6	5	4
4	(Kazakhstan) E Rybakina	3	7	6

Third round
(China) Xin Wang	4	6^{5}
17	(United States) M Keys	6	7^{7}
Q	(United States) T Townsend	3	7^{7}	4
4	(Kazakhstan) E Rybakina	6	6^{3}	6

Fourth round
17	(United States) M Keys	3	5
4	(Kazakhstan) E Rybakina	6	7

==== Section 7 ====
First round
(Romania) A Bogdan	2	4
(Czech Republic) K Siniaková	6	6
(United States) P Stearns	6	6
(China) Y Wang	2	3
Q	(Argentina) ML Carlé	3	3
WC	(Czech Republic) B Fruhvirtová	6	6
(Romania) J Cristian	6^{2}	2
(France) D Parry	7^{7}	6

Second round
7	(China) Q Zheng	4	6	1
(Czech Republic) K Siniaková	6	3	0^{r}
(United States) P Stearns	5	6	4
27	V Azarenka	7	3	6
24	(United Kingdom) K Boulter	7^{7}	1
WC	(Czech Republic) B Fruhvirtová	6^{5}	0^{r}
(France) D Parry	6	1	4
11	(Brazil) B Haddad Maia	3	6	6

Third round
7	(China) Q Zheng	4	5
27	V Azarenka	6	7
24	(United Kingdom) K Boulter	6	6
11	(Brazil) B Haddad Maia	2	3

Fourth round
27	V Azarenka	7	6
24	(United Kingdom) K Boulter	5	1

==== Section 8 ====
First round
(Spain) C Bucșa	2	6	4
(Kazakhstan) Y Putintseva	6	3	6
(Ukraine) L Tsurenko	2	6	6
(Poland) M Linette	6	1	4
(France) C Burel	1	4
WC	(Denmark) C Wozniacki	6	6
WC	(Romania) S Halep	6	4	3
PR	(Spain) P Badosa	1	6	6

Second round
13	L Samsonova	1	6	3
(Kazakhstan) Y Putintseva	6	4	6
(Ukraine) L Tsurenko	5	1
LL	(Belgium) G Minnen	7	6
32	(Ukraine) A Kalinina	5	7	6
WC	(Denmark) C Wozniacki	7	5	4
PR	(Spain) P Badosa	4	3
2	A Sabalenka	6	6

Third round
(Kazakhstan) Y Putintseva	6	2	6
LL	(Belgium) G Minnen	2	6	4
32	(Ukraine) A Kalinina	6	1	6
2	A Sabalenka	4	6	1

Fourth round
(Kazakhstan) Y Putintseva	6	7^{7}
32	(Ukraine) A Kalinina	4	6^{5}

== Seeded players ==
The following are the seeded players. Seedings are based on WTA rankings as of March 4, 2024. Rankings and points before are as of March 18, 2024.

Seed	Rank	Player	Points before	Points defending	Points earned	Points after	Status
1	1	(Poland) Iga Świątek	10,715	0	120	10,835	Fourth round lost to Ekaterina Alexandrova [14]
2	2	Aryna Sabalenka	8,195	215	65	8,045	Third round lost to (Ukraine) Anhelina Kalinina [32]
3	3	(United States) Coco Gauff	7,150	65	120	7,205	Fourth round lost to (France) Caroline Garcia [23]
4	4	(Kazakhstan) Elena Rybakina	5,848	650	650	5,848	Runner-up, lost to (United States) Danielle Collins
5	5	(United States) Jessica Pegula	5,035	390	215	4,860	Quarterfinals lost to Ekaterina Alexandrova [14]
6	6	(Tunisia) Ons Jabeur	4,118	10	10	4,118	Second round lost to Elina Avanesyan
7	7	(China) Zheng Qinwen	4,050	120	65	3,995	Third round lost to Victoria Azarenka [27]
8	9	(Greece) Maria Sakkari	3,825	10	215	4,030	Quarterfinals lost to (Kazakhstan) Elena Rybakina [4]
9	10	(Latvia) Jeļena Ostapenko	3,493	120	65	3,438	Third round lost to Anna Kalinskaya [22]
10	11	Daria Kasatkina	3,118	10	65	3,173	Third round lost to (Romania) Sorana Cîrstea [19]
11	13	(Brazil) Beatriz Haddad Maia	2,870	65	65	2,870	Third round lost to (United Kingdom) Katie Boulter [24]
12	14	(Italy) Jasmine Paolini	2,810	10	65	2,865	Third round lost to (United States) Emma Navarro [20]
13	15	Liudmila Samsonova	2,605	65	10	2,550	Second round lost to (Kazakhstan) Yulia Putintseva
14	16	Ekaterina Alexandrova	2,475	215	390	2,650	Semifinals lost to (United States) Danielle Collins
15	17	(Ukraine) Elina Svitolina	2,397	(1)^{†}	10	2,406	Second round lost to (Japan) Naomi Osaka [PR]
16	19	Veronika Kudermetova	2,305	10	10	2,305	Second round lost to (China) Wang Xinyu
17	18	(United States) Madison Keys	2,342	65	120	2,397	Fourth round lost to (Kazakhstan) Elena Rybakina [4]
18	21	(Czech Republic) Barbora Krejčíková	2,113	120	0	1,993	Withdrew due to illness
19	24	(Romania) Sorana Cîrstea	2,018	390	120	1,748	Fourth round lost to (United States) Danielle Collins
20	20	(United States) Emma Navarro	2,178	(80)^{†}	120	2,218	Fourth round lost vs. (United States) Jessica Pegula [5]
21	22	Anastasia Pavlyuchenkova	2,091	(15)^{‡}	65	2,141	Third round lost to Ekaterina Alexandrova [14]
22	25	Anna Kalinskaya	1,973	35	120	2,058	Fourth round withdrew
23	27	(France) Caroline Garcia	1,865	10	215	2,070	Quarterfinals lost to (United States) Danielle Collins
24	30	(United Kingdom) Katie Boulter	1,690	(8)^{‡}	120	1,802	Fourth round lost to Victoria Azarenka [27]
25	28	(Belgium) Elise Mertens	1,756	120	10	1,646	Second round lost to (United States) Taylor Townsend [Q]
26	31	(Czech Republic) Linda Nosková	1,613	35	65	1,643	Third round lost to (Poland) Iga Świątek [1]
27	32	Victoria Azarenka	1,591	65	390	1,916	Semifinals lost to (Kazakhstan) Elena Rybakina [4]
28	33	(Ukraine) Dayana Yastremska	1,552	20	65	1,597	Third round lost to (Greece) Maria Sakkari [8]
29	26	(Ukraine) Marta Kostyuk	1,946	35	0	1,911	Withdrew due to illness
30	29	Anastasia Potapova	1,707	215	10	1,502	Second round lost to (United States) Danielle Collins
31	35	(Canada) Leylah Fernandez	1,490	35	65	1,520	Third round lost to (United States) Jessica Pegula [5]
32	36	(Ukraine) Anhelina Kalinina	1,483	10	120	1,593	Fourth round lost to (Kazakhstan) Yulia Putintseva

† The player did not qualify for the main draw in 2023. Points for her 18th best result will be deducted instead.
‡ The player did not qualify for the main draw in 2023. She is defending points from an ITF Women's Tour event (Croissy-Beaubourg) instead.

=== Withdrawn players ===
The following players would have been seeded, but withdrew before the tournament began.

Rank	Player	Points before	Points dropped	Points after	Withdrawal reason
8	(Czech Republic) Markéta Vondroušová	4,015	120	3,895	Personal
12	(Czech Republic) Karolína Muchová	3,060	95	2,965	Wrist surgery
23	(Czech Republic) Petra Kvitová	2,090	1,000	1,090	Pregnancy

== Other entry information ==
=== Wild cards ===
- Erika Andreeva
- (United States) Hailey Baptiste
- (Czech Republic) Brenda Fruhvirtová
- (Czech Republic) Linda Fruhvirtová
- (Romania) Simona Halep
- ~~(United Kingdom) Emma Raducanu~~
- (United States) Venus Williams
- (Denmark) Caroline Wozniacki

=== Protected ranking ===
- (Spain) Paula Badosa
- (Germany) Angelique Kerber
- (Japan) Naomi Osaka
- (United States) Shelby Rogers
- (Australia) Daria Saville
- (China) Zhang Shuai

=== Withdrawals ===
- ‡ Mirra Andreeva → replaced by (Italy) Camila Giorgi
- ‡ (United States) Amanda Anisimova → replaced by (United States) Ashlyn Krueger
- † (Switzerland) Belinda Bencic → replaced by (China) Yuan Yue
- § (Switzerland) Viktorija Golubic → replaced by (United States) Bernarda Pera (LL)
- § (Ukraine) Marta Kostyuk → replaced by (France) Océane Dodin (LL)
- § (Czech Republic) Barbora Krejčíková → replaced by (Belgium) Greet Minnen (LL)
- † (Czech Republic) Petra Kvitová → replaced by (Bulgaria) Viktoriya Tomova
- ‡ (Czech Republic) Karolína Muchová → replaced by (Romania) Jaqueline Cristian
- @ (United Kingdom) Emma Raducanu → replaced by (Germany) Tamara Korpatsch (LL)
- ‡ (Latvia) Anastasija Sevastova → replaced by (Switzerland) Viktorija Golubic
- ‡ (Egypt) Mayar Sherif → replaced by Diana Shnaider
- ‡ (Czech Republic) Markéta Vondroušová → replaced by (Kazakhstan) Yulia Putintseva

† – not included on entry list
‡ – withdrew from entry list
@ – withdrew as wild card after draw was made, later withdrew from main draw
§ – withdrew from main draw

== Qualifying ==
=== Seeds ===
1. (Slovakia) Anna Karolína Schmiedlová (qualified)
2. (Germany) Tamara Korpatsch (qualifying competition, lucky loser)
3. (United States) Taylor Townsend (qualified)
4. (United States) Bernarda Pera (qualifying competition, lucky loser)
5. (Japan) Nao Hibino (first round)
6. (Belgium) Greet Minnen (qualifying competition, lucky loser)
7. (Argentina) Nadia Podoroska (qualified)
8. (France) Océane Dodin (qualifying competition, lucky loser)
9. (Germany) Laura Siegemund (qualified)
10. (United States) Kayla Day (first round)
11. (Belgium) Yanina Wickmayer (qualifying competition)
12. (United Kingdom) Harriet Dart (qualifying competition)
13. (Colombia) Camila Osorio (qualifying competition)
14. (United States) Emina Bektas (qualifying competition)
15. (Denmark) Clara Tauson (qualified)
16. Kamilla Rakhimova (first round)
17. (Spain) Rebeka Masarova (first round)
18. Aliaksandra Sasnovich (first round)
19. (Argentina) María Lourdes Carlé (qualified)
20. (Italy) Sara Errani (first round)
21. (Mexico) Renata Zarazúa (first round)
22. Maria Timofeeva (qualified)
23. (France) Alizé Cornet (first round)
24. (Australia) Arina Rodionova (first round)

=== Qualifiers ===
1. (Slovakia) Anna Karolína Schmiedlová
2. Maria Timofeeva
3. (United States) Taylor Townsend
4. (Serbia) Aleksandra Krunić
5. (Australia) Storm Hunter
6. (United States) Claire Liu
7. (Argentina) Nadia Podoroska
8. (Denmark) Clara Tauson
9. (Germany) Laura Siegemund
10. (Colombia) Emiliana Arango
11. (United States) Katie Volynets
12. (Argentina) María Lourdes Carlé

=== Lucky losers ===
1. (Germany) Tamara Korpatsch
2. (United States) Bernarda Pera
3. (Belgium) Greet Minnen
4. (France) Océane Dodin

=== Draw ===
==== First qualifier ====
First round
1	(Slovakia) Anna Karolína Schmiedlová	6	6
(Hungary) Anna Bondár	3	2
(Slovakia) Rebecca Šramková	6	6
17	(Spain) Rebeka Masarova	4	4

Qualifying competition
1	(Slovakia) Anna Karolína Schmiedlová	6	3	6
(Slovakia) Rebecca Šramková	3	6	3

==== Second qualifier ====
First round
2	(Germany) Tamara Korpatsch	7	6
(Japan) Mai Hontama	5	3
(Spain) Marina Bassols Ribera	1	2
22	Maria Timofeeva	6	6

Qualifying competition
2	(Germany) Tamara Korpatsch	2	1
22	Maria Timofeeva	6	6

==== Third qualifier ====
First round
3	(United States) Taylor Townsend	6	6
(Brazil) Laura Pigossi	4	4
(Spain) Jéssica Bouzas Maneiro	3	1
14	(United States) Emina Bektas	6	6

Qualifying competition
3	(United States) Taylor Townsend	6	5	6
14	(United States) Emina Bektas	2	7	3

==== Fourth qualifier ====
First round
4	(United States) Bernarda Pera	6	6
WC	(Japan) Sayaka Ishii	0	4
PR	(Serbia) Aleksandra Krunić	6	7^{7}
18	Aliaksandra Sasnovich	1	6^{4}

Qualifying competition
4	(United States) Bernarda Pera	4	3
PR	(Serbia) Aleksandra Krunić	6	6

==== Fifth qualifier ====
First round
5	(Japan) Nao Hibino	6^{5}	6	4
(Germany) Jule Niemeier	7^{7}	2	6
(Australia) Storm Hunter	7^{7}	2	6
23	(France) Alizé Cornet	6^{1}	6	4

Qualifying competition
(Germany) Jule Niemeier	4	5
(Australia) Storm Hunter	6	7

==== Sixth qualifier ====
First round
6	(Belgium) Greet Minnen	6	6
PR	(Chinese Taipei) Hsieh Su-wei	1	4
(United States) Claire Liu	4	6	7^{7}
16	Kamilla Rakhimova	6	3	6^{4}

Qualifying competition
6	(Belgium) Greet Minnen	3	2
(United States) Claire Liu	6	6

==== Seventh qualifier ====
First round
7	(Argentina) Nadia Podoroska	6^{7}	6	6
(Argentina) Julia Riera	7^{9}	4	1
(United States) McCartney Kessler	3	6	2
13	(Colombia) Camila Osorio	6	1	6

Qualifying competition
7	(Argentina) Nadia Podoroska	6	6
13	(Colombia) Camila Osorio	2	2

==== Eighth qualifier ====
First round
8	(France) Océane Dodin	6	1	6
WC	(United Kingdom) Heather Watson	4	6	3
(Slovenia) Tamara Zidanšek	4	3
15	(Denmark) Clara Tauson	6	6

Qualifying competition
8	(France) Océane Dodin	4	6^{1}
15	(Denmark) Clara Tauson	6	7^{7}

==== Ninth qualifier ====
First round
9	(Germany) Laura Siegemund	6	6
WC	(United States) Robin Montgomery	0	0
(Latvia) Darja Semeņistaja	7^{7}	6
24	(Australia) Arina Rodionova	6^{1}	2

Qualifying competition
9	(Germany) Laura Siegemund	6	6
(Latvia) Darja Semeņistaja	0	2

==== Tenth qualifier ====
First round
10	(United States) Kayla Day	5	7	4
(Colombia) Emiliana Arango	7	5	6
WC	(Philippines) Alexandra Eala	6	6
20	(Italy) Sara Errani	3	1

Qualifying competition
(Colombia) Emiliana Arango	2	7	6
WC	(Philippines) Alexandra Eala	6	5	1

==== Eleventh qualifier ====
First round
11	(Belgium) Yanina Wickmayer	6	6
(United States) Alycia Parks	4	4
(United States) Katie Volynets	7	4	6
21	(Mexico) Renata Zarazúa	5	6	1

Qualifying competition
11	(Belgium) Yanina Wickmayer	6	3	3
(United States) Katie Volynets	3	6	6

==== Twelfth qualifier ====
First round
12	(United Kingdom) Harriet Dart	6	6
WC	(Japan) Ena Koike	2	3
WC	(Andorra) Victoria Jiménez Kasintseva	6	4	4
19	(Argentina) María Lourdes Carlé	2	6	6

Qualifying competition
12	(United Kingdom) Harriet Dart	6	6^{5}	3
19	(Argentina) María Lourdes Carlé	1	7^{7}	6
