= 2014 Open GDF Suez Seine-et-Marne – Doubles =

Doubles
- 2014 Open GDF Suez Seine-et-Marne

Final
- Champions: (Russia) Margarita Gasparyan (Ukraine) Lyudmyla Kichenok
- Runners-up: (Germany) Kristina Barrois (Greece) Eleni Daniilidou
- Score: 6–2, 6–4

Events
Singles	Doubles
← 2013 ·	Open GDF Suez Seine-et-Marne	· 2015 →

Anna-Lena Friedsam and Alison Van Uytvanck were the defending champions, but neither player decided to participate.

Margarita Gasparyan and Lyudmyla Kichenok won the tournament, defeating Kristina Barrois and Eleni Daniilidou in the final, 6–2, 6–4.

== Seeds ==
1. (Austria) Sandra Klemenschits / (Slovenia) Andreja Klepač (semifinals)
2. (Japan) Shuko Aoyama / (Czech Republic) Renata Voráčová (quarterfinals)
3. (Germany) Kristina Barrois / (Greece) Eleni Daniilidou (final)
4. (Serbia) Vesna Dolonc / (Liechtenstein) Stephanie Vogt (quarterfinals; withdrew)

== Draw ==
=== Key ===
- Q = Qualifier
- WC = Wild card
- LL = Lucky loser
- Alt = Alternate
- SE = Special exempt
- PR = Protected ranking
- ITF = ITF entry
- JE = Junior exempt
- w/o = Walkover
- r = Retired
- d = Defaulted
- SR = Special ranking

First round
1	(Austria) S Klemenschits (Slovenia) A Klepač	2	7	[10]
WC	(Italy) A Brianti (Hungary) R-L Jani	6	5	[8]
(Ukraine) Y Beygelzimer (Turkey) Ç Büyükakçay	6	6
(Ukraine) V Ivakhnenko (Ukraine) K Kozlova	4	3
3	(Germany) K Barrois (Greece) E Daniilidou	5	6	[10]
(Switzerland) V Golubic (Poland) M Linette	7	4	[3]
(Thailand) N Lerpitaksinchai (Thailand) P Plipuech	2	1
(Czech Republic) Kr Plíšková (Czech Republic) K Siniaková	6	6
(Germany) C Shakovets (Georgia (country)) S Shapatava	1	4
(France) J Coin (France) P Parmentier	6	6
WC	(France) A Collombon (France) C Paquet	4	6	[5]
4	(Serbia) V Dolonc (Liechtenstein) S Vogt	6	3	[10]
WC	(Italy) N Clerico (Italy) G Gatto-Monticone	0	0
(Russia) M Gasparyan (Ukraine) L Kichenok	6	6
(Russia) E Bychkova (France) S Foretz Gacon	1	2
2	(Japan) S Aoyama (Czech Republic) R Voráčová	6	6

Quarterfinals
1	(Austria) S Klemenschits (Slovenia) A Klepač	4	6	[12]
(Ukraine) Y Beygelzimer (Turkey) Ç Büyükakçay	6	3	[10]
3	(Germany) K Barrois (Greece) E Daniilidou	w/o
(Czech Republic) Kr Plíšková (Czech Republic) K Siniaková
(France) J Coin (France) P Parmentier	w/o
4	(Serbia) V Dolonc (Liechtenstein) S Vogt
(Russia) M Gasparyan (Ukraine) L Kichenok	7	5	[12]
2	(Japan) S Aoyama (Czech Republic) R Voráčová	5	7	[10]

Semifinals
1	(Austria) S Klemenschits (Slovenia) A Klepač	6^{2}	6^{4}
3	(Germany) K Barrois (Greece) E Daniilidou	7^{7}	7^{7}
(France) J Coin (France) P Parmentier	6^{9}	4
(Russia) M Gasparyan (Ukraine) L Kichenok	7^{11}	6

Final
3	(Germany) K Barrois (Greece) E Daniilidou	2	4
(Russia) M Gasparyan (Ukraine) L Kichenok	6	6
