= 2013 Open GDF Suez Seine-et-Marne – Doubles =

Doubles
- 2013 Open GDF Suez Seine-et-Marne

Final
- Champions: (Germany) Anna-Lena Friedsam (Belgium) Alison Van Uytvanck
- Runners-up: (France) Stéphanie Foretz Gacon (Czech Republic) Eva Hrdinová
- Score: 6–3, 6–4

Events
Singles	Doubles
← 2012 ·	Open GDF Suez Seine-et-Marne	· 2014 →

This was a new event in 2013.

Anna-Lena Friedsam and Alison Van Uytvanck won the title, defeating Stéphanie Foretz Gacon and Eva Hrdinová in the final, 6–3, 6–4.

== Seeds ==
1. (France) Stéphanie Foretz Gacon / (Czech Republic) Eva Hrdinová (final)
2. (France) Séverine Beltrame / (France) Julie Coin (first round)
3. (Austria) Sandra Klemenschits / (Croatia) Ana Vrljić (first round)
4. (Italy) Alberta Brianti / (United Kingdom) Anne Keothavong (semifinals)

== Draw ==
=== Key ===
- Q = Qualifier
- WC = Wild card
- LL = Lucky loser
- Alt = Alternate
- SE = Special exempt
- PR = Protected ranking
- ITF = ITF entry
- JE = Junior exempt
- w/o = Walkover
- r = Retired
- d = Defaulted
- SR = Special ranking

First round
1	(France) S Foretz Gacon (Czech Republic) E Hrdinová	6	6
WC	(France) M Arcangioli (France) L Sarrazin	4	4
WC	(France) M Beugre Guyot (France) M Lena	4	3
(Italy) ME Camerin (Italy) C Dentoni	6	6
4	(Italy) A Brianti (United Kingdom) A Keothavong	7	6
(Netherlands) D Harmsen (Russia) M Melnikova	5	1
(Germany) K Barrois (Russia) E Bychkova	2	4
(Slovenia) T Majerič (Germany) A Schäfer	6	6
(Russia) M Kondratieva (Bulgaria) E Kostova	2	2
(Poland) P Kania (Ukraine) M Zanevska	6	6
(Germany) A-L Friedsam (Belgium) A Van Uytvanck	6	6^{3}	[10]
3	(Austria) S Klemenschits (Croatia) A Vrljić	4	7^{7}	[6]
(Italy) N Clerico (Germany) A Lottner	1	2
(Poland) J Jegiołka (Russia) M Shamayko	6	6
WC	(France) A Hesse (France) I Ramialison	6	7^{7}
2	(France) S Beltrame (France) J Coin	4	6^{4}

Quarterfinals
1	(France) S Foretz Gacon (Czech Republic) E Hrdinová	6	5	[10]
(Italy) ME Camerin (Italy) C Dentoni	2	7	[8]
4	(Italy) A Brianti (United Kingdom) A Keothavong	5	6	[11]
(Slovenia) T Majerič (Germany) A Schäfer	7	2	[9]
(Poland) P Kania (Ukraine) M Zanevska	6^{3}	6	[5]
(Germany) A-L Friedsam (Belgium) A Van Uytvanck	7^{7}	4	[10]
(Poland) J Jegiołka (Russia) M Shamayko	2	7	[10]
WC	(France) A Hesse (France) I Ramialison	6	6^{3}	[8]

Semifinals
1	(France) S Foretz Gacon (Czech Republic) E Hrdinová	7^{7}	6
4	(Italy) A Brianti (United Kingdom) A Keothavong	6^{3}	2
(Germany) A-L Friedsam (Belgium) A Van Uytvanck	6	7^{7}
(Poland) J Jegiołka (Russia) M Shamayko	3	6^{5}

Final
1	(France) S Foretz Gacon (Czech Republic) E Hrdinová	3	4
(Germany) A-L Friedsam (Belgium) A Van Uytvanck	6	6
