= 2023 Open de Seine-et-Marne – Singles =

Singles
- 2023 Open de Seine-et-Marne

Final
- Champion: (United Kingdom) Jodie Burrage
- Runner-up: (Italy) Lucia Bronzetti
- Score: 3–6, 6–4, 6–0

Events
Singles	Doubles
← 2022 ·	Open de Seine-et-Marne	· 2024 →

Linda Nosková was the defending champion but chose not to participate.

Jodie Burrage won the title, defeating Lucia Bronzetti in the final, 3–6, 6–4, 6–0.

== Seeds ==
1. (Italy) Lucia Bronzetti (final)
2. (Belgium) Ysaline Bonaventure (first round)
3. (France) Océane Dodin (first round)
4. (United Kingdom) Jodie Burrage (champion)
5. (France) Jessika Ponchet (second round)
6. Polina Kudermetova (first round)
7. Oksana Selekhmeteva (first round)
8. (United Kingdom) Katie Boulter (second round)

== Draw ==
=== Key ===
- Q = Qualifier
- WC = Wild card
- LL = Lucky loser
- Alt = Alternate
- SE = Special exempt
- PR = Protected ranking
- ITF = ITF entry
- JE = Junior exempt
- w/o = Walkover
- r = Retired
- d = Defaulted
- SR = Special ranking

=== Finals ===
Semifinals
1	(Italy) Lucia Bronzetti	6	6
Q	(France) Margaux Rouvroy	2	2
4	(United Kingdom) Jodie Burrage	5	6	6
(Belgium) Yanina Wickmayer	7	3	3

Final
1	(Italy) Lucia Bronzetti	6	4	0
4	(United Kingdom) Jodie Burrage	3	6	6

=== Top half ===
First round
1	(Italy) L Bronzetti	6	6
Q	(United Kingdom) A Brogan	2	3
(Turkey) B Cengiz	7	4	6^{4}
WC	(France) A Tubello	5	6	7^{7}
WC	(France) M Léonard	6	6
(France) C Paquet	1	0
WC	A Pavlyuchenkova	6	6
6	P Kudermetova	2	4
3	(France) O Dodin	6	4	3
Q	(Italy) F Di Sarra	1	6	6
(France) E Jacquemot	6	7^{9}
Q	S Lansere	3	6^{7}
Q	(France) M Rouvroy	6	6
(Germany) M Barthel	2	2
Q	(United Kingdom) E Appleton	7	4	4
8	(United Kingdom) K Boulter	5	6	6

Second round
1	(Italy) L Bronzetti	6	6
WC	(France) A Tubello	4	4
WC	(France) M Léonard	4	3
WC	A Pavlyuchenkova	6	6
Q	(Italy) F Di Sarra	3	2
(France) E Jacquemot	6	6
Q	(France) M Rouvroy	7^{7}	6
8	(United Kingdom) K Boulter	6^{5}	1

Quarterfinals
1	(Italy) L Bronzetti	6	6
WC	A Pavlyuchenkova	3	3
(France) E Jacquemot	6	4	3
Q	(France) M Rouvroy	3	6	6

Semifinals
1	(Italy) L Bronzetti	6	6
Q	(France) M Rouvroy	2	2

=== Bottom half ===
First round
7	O Selekhmeteva	0	0
(Belgium) G Minnen	6	6
Q	J Avdeeva	6	6
WC	(France) Y Mansouri	2	4
(France) A Robbe	2	6	4
V Diatchenko	6	3	6
Y Hatouka	5	1
4	(United Kingdom) J Burrage	7	6
5	(France) J Ponchet	6	6
Q	(France) A Hesse	3	0
(Netherlands) L Pattinama Kerkhove	3	6	6
Q	K Zaytseva	6	3	0
(Belgium) Y Wickmayer	6	6
(United Kingdom) E Silva	1	3
(France) A Albié	1	6	6
2	(Belgium) Y Bonaventure	6	2	4

Second round
(Belgium) G Minnen	6	6
Q	J Avdeeva	4	4
V Diatchenko	3	1
4	(United Kingdom) J Burrage	6	6
5	(France) J Ponchet	6	6^{4}	4
(Netherlands) L Pattinama Kerkhove	4	7^{7}	6
(Belgium) Y Wickmayer	6	6
(France) A Albié	1	3

Quarterfinals
(Belgium) G Minnen	6	5	4
4	(United Kingdom) J Burrage	3	7	6
(Netherlands) L Pattinama Kerkhove	2	3
(Belgium) Y Wickmayer	6	6

Semifinals
4	(United Kingdom) J Burrage	5	6	6
(Belgium) Y Wickmayer	7	3	3
