= 2022 Engie Open de Seine-et-Marne – Singles =

Singles
- 2022 Engie Open de Seine-et-Marne

Final
- Champion: (Czech Republic) Linda Nosková
- Runner-up: (France) Léolia Jeanjean
- Score: 6–3, 6–4

Events
Singles	Doubles
← 2019 ·	Open de Seine-et-Marne	· 2023 →

Vitalia Diatchenko was the defending champion but chose not to participate.

Linda Nosková won the title, defeating Léolia Jeanjean in the final, 6–3, 6–4.

== Seeds ==
1. (France) Chloé Paquet (semifinals)
2. (Spain) Cristina Bucșa (quarterfinals)
3. (Netherlands) Lesley Pattinama Kerkhove (second round)
4. (Ukraine) Daria Snigur (quarterfinals)
5. (France) Jessika Ponchet (withdrew)
6. Oksana Selekhmeteva (first round)
7. (Belgium) Ysaline Bonaventure (quarterfinals)
8. (Italy) Giulia Gatto-Monticone (first round)

== Draw ==
=== Key ===
- Q = Qualifier
- WC = Wild card
- LL = Lucky loser
- Alt = Alternate
- SE = Special exempt
- PR = Protected ranking
- ITF = ITF entry
- JE = Junior exempt
- w/o = Walkover
- r = Retired
- d = Defaulted
- SR = Special ranking

=== Finals ===
Semifinals
1	(France) Chloé Paquet	6^{1}	7	6^{2}
(Czech Republic) Linda Nosková	7^{7}	5	7^{7}
Q	(France) Léolia Jeanjean	2	6	7
(Liechtenstein) Kathinka von Deichmann	6	1	5

Final
(Czech Republic) Linda Nosková	6	6
Q	(France) Léolia Jeanjean	3	4

=== Top half ===
First round
1	(France) C Paquet	6	6
WC	(France) M Léonard	1	1
WC	(France) A Albié	6	6
(Bulgaria) I Shinikova	4	3
WC	(France) M Noël	2	7^{7}	3
(Finland) A Kulikova	6	6^{1}	6
N Vikhlyantseva	5	4
7	(Belgium) Y Bonaventure	7	6
3	(Netherlands) L Pattinama Kerkhove	4	6	6
(Lithuania) J Mikulskytė	6	4	3
(Czech Republic) L Nosková	6	6
(Italy) C Ferrando	3	4
Q	(France) F Brugnone	3	1
(France) E Jacquemot	6	6
Q	D Astakhova	6	6
6	O Selekhmeteva	3	3

Second round
1	(France) C Paquet	6	6
WC	(France) A Albié	3	0
(Finland) A Kulikova	6	4	2
7	(Belgium) Y Bonaventure	2	6	6
3	(Netherlands) L Pattinama Kerkhove	4	3
(Czech Republic) L Nosková	6	6
(France) E Jacquemot	6	6
Q	D Astakhova	2	4

Quarterfinals
1	(France) C Paquet	6	7^{7}
7	(Belgium) Y Bonaventure	3	6^{4}
(Czech Republic) L Nosková	4	6	7^{7}
(France) E Jacquemot	6	2	6^{4}

Semifinals
1	(France) C Paquet	6^{1}	7	6^{2}
(Czech Republic) L Nosková	7^{7}	5	7^{7}

=== Bottom half ===
First round
8	(Italy) G Gatto-Monticone	6^{4}	4
(Latvia) D Marcinkēviča	7^{7}	6
Q	(France) L Jeanjean	6	6^{5}	7
Y Hatouka	3	7^{7}	5
Q	(Spain) C Cerviño Ruiz	7^{8}	3	4
Q	(Turkey) B Cengiz	6^{6}	6	6
Q	(Germany) Y Morderger	2	0
4	(Ukraine) D Snigur	6	6
LL	(Italy) M Di Giuseppe	2	1
(Croatia) T Mrdeža	6	6
(Liechtenstein) K von Deichmann	6	6
WC	(France) M Partaud	2	2
A Kubareva	6^{4}	2
Q	(Germany) M Barthel	7^{7}	6
Q	(China) Jin Lu	4	1
2	(Spain) C Bucșa	6	6

Second round
(Latvia) D Marcinkēviča	4	6	4
Q	(France) L Jeanjean	6	4	6
Q	(Turkey) B Cengiz	0	6^{3}
4	(Ukraine) D Snigur	6	7^{7}
(Croatia) T Mrdeža	6	6^{2}	3
(Liechtenstein) K von Deichmann	1	7^{7}	6
Q	(Germany) M Barthel	4	4
2	(Spain) C Bucșa	6	6

Quarterfinals
Q	(France) L Jeanjean	6	6
4	(Ukraine) D Snigur	3	3
(Liechtenstein) K von Deichmann	5	7	6
2	(Spain) C Bucșa	7	5	4

Semifinals
Q	(France) L Jeanjean	2	6	7
(Liechtenstein) K von Deichmann	6	1	5
