= Isabelle Haverlag =

Dutch tennis player (born 2001)

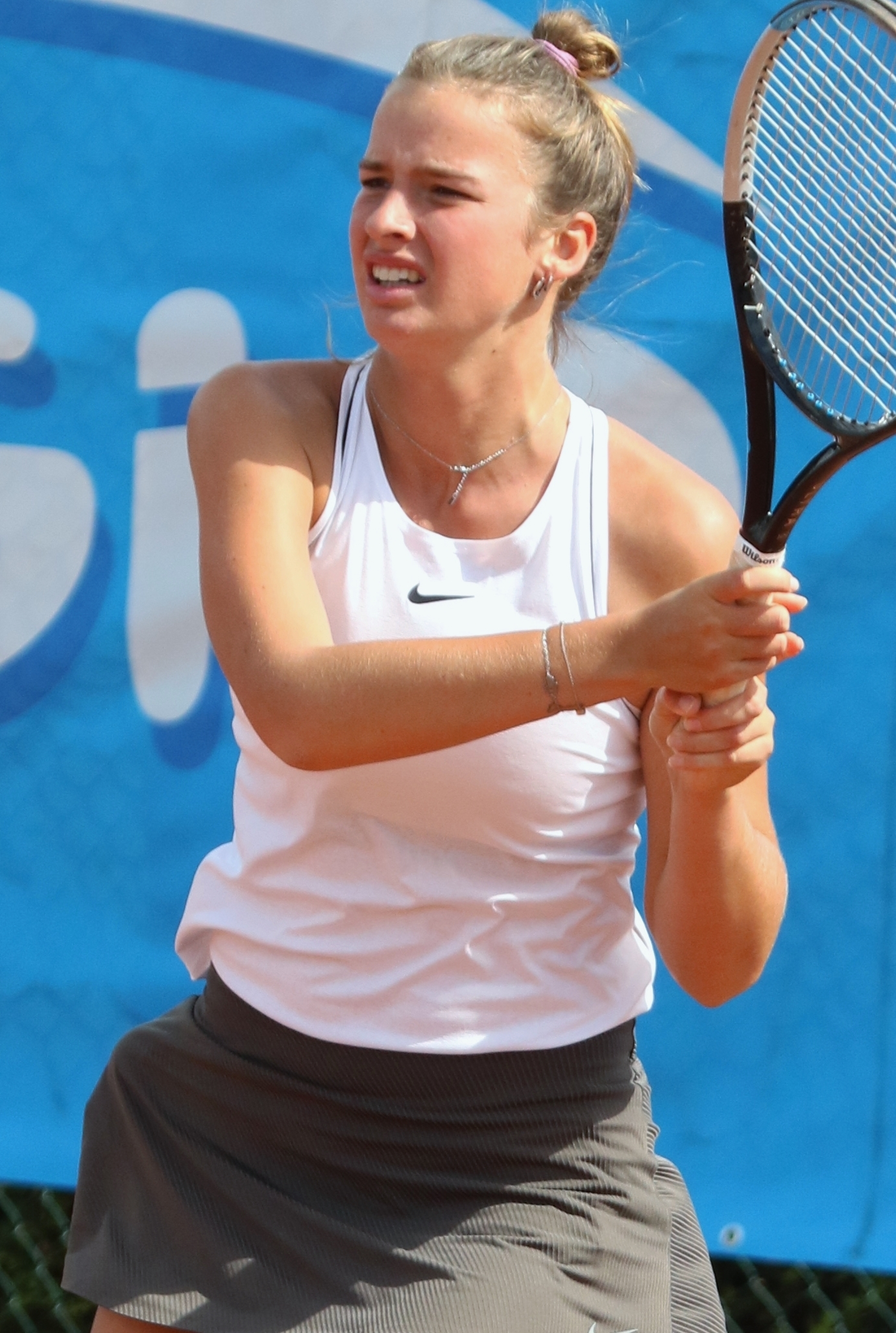
- Country (sports): Netherlands
- Born: 4 March 2001 (age 25)
- Turned pro: 2018
- Plays: Left-handed
- Prize money: $244,845

Singles
- Career record: 34–61
- Career titles: 0
- Highest ranking: No. 1,236 (12 August 2019)

Doubles
- Career record: 268–195
- Career titles: 5 WTA 125, 14 ITF
- Highest ranking: No. 65 (8 June 2026)
- Current ranking: No. 65 (2 November 2026)

Grand Slam doubles results
- Australian Open: 1R (2026)
- French Open: 1R (2026)
- Wimbledon: 1R (2025, 2026)
- US Open: 1R (2026)
- Last updated on: 2 November 2026.

Isabelle Haverlag (born 4 March 2001) is a Dutch tennis player who specializes in doubles. She has a career-high doubles ranking of No. 65 by the WTA, achieved on 8 June 2026. She has won five WTA 125 doubles titles as well as 14 doubles titles on the ITF Women's World Tennis Tour.

== Career ==
She won her first big title at the 2022 Open de Seine-et-Marne, in the doubles draw, partnering Justina Mikulskytė.

In June 2022, she made her WTA Tour debut in doubles with compatriot Suzan Lamens at her home tournament, the Rosmalen Open, where as a wildcard pair they reached the quarterfinals defeating third seeds Kaitlyn Christian and Giuliana Olmos. In July 2024 at the Budapest Grand Prix, she reached the semifinals with Christina Rosca.

In February 2025 at the ATX Open, Haverlag and her partner Alicja Rosolska reached the semifinals defeating second seeded pair of former No. 1 doubles player Storm Hunter and former top 10 player Caroline Dolehide en route. Playing alongside Simona Waltert, she won her first WTA 125 doubles title at the 2025 Ilkley Open by defeating Vitalia Diatchenko and Eden Silva in the final.

Partnering Maia Lumsden, Haverlag reached her first WTA Tour final at the 2026 Mérida Open, losing to second seeds Cristina Bucșa and Jiang Xinyu. Once again teaming up with Lumsden, she won the second WTA 125 title at the 2026 Open de Saint-Malo, defeating Chan Hao-ching and Ivana Corley in the final.

== WTA Tour finals ==
=== Doubles: 1 (runner-up) ===
Legend WTA 500 (1–0) WTA 250 (0–0)	Finals by surface Hard (1–0)

Result	W–L	Date	Tournament	Tier	Surface	Partner	Opponents	Score
Loss	0–1	Mar 2026	Mérida Open, Mexico	WTA 500	Hard	(United Kingdom) Maia Lumsden	(Spain) Cristina Bucșa (China) Jiang Xinyu	4–6, 1–6

== WTA 125 finals ==
=== Doubles: 8 (5 titles, 3 runner-ups) ===
Result	W–L	Date	Tournament	Surface	Partner	Opponents	Score
Win	1–0	Jun 2025	Ilkley Open, United Kingdom	Grass	(Switzerland) Simona Waltert	Vitalia Diatchenko (United Kingdom) Eden Silva	6–1, 6–1
Loss	1–1	Jul 2025	Contrexéville Open, France	Clay	(United Kingdom) Emily Appleton	(United States) Quinn Gleason (Brazil) Ingrid Martins	1–6, 6–7^{(4–7)}
Loss	1–2	Jul 2025	Polish Open, Poland	Hard	(Poland) Martyna Kubka	(Poland) Weronika Falkowska (Czech Republic) Dominika Šalková	2–6, 1–6
Loss	1–3	Mar 2026	Austin Challenger, United States	Hard	(United States) Sabrina Santamaria	(Chinese Taipei) Chan Hao-ching (Japan) Miyu Kato	2–6, 3–6
Win	2–3	May 2026	Open de Saint-Malo, France	Clay	(United Kingdom) Maia Lumsden	(Chinese Taipei) Chan Hao-ching (United States) Ivana Corley	6–4, 6–0
Win	3–3	Jun 2026	Makarska Open, Croatia	Clay	(Switzerland) Simona Waltert	(Brazil) Ingrid Martins; Ekaterina Ovcharenko	2–2 ret.
Win	4–3	Aug 2026	Philly Open, United States	Hard	(Slovenia) Nika Radišić	(Czech Republic) Jesika Malečková (Czech Republic) Miriam Škoch	6–2, 1–6, [10–7]
Win	5–3	Oct 2026	Internazionali di Rovereto, Italy	Hard (i)	(Poland) Martyna Kubka	(Czech Republic) Dominika Šalková (Czech Republic) Anna Sisková	6–1, 6–2

== ITF Circuit finals ==
=== Doubles: 37 (14 titles, 23 runner-ups) ===
Legend
W100 tournaments
W60/75 tournaments
W40/50 tournaments
W25/35 tournaments
W15 tournaments

Result	W–L	Date	Tournament	Tier	Surface	Partner	Opponents	Score
Win	1–0	Mar 2018	ITF Amiens, France	W15	Clay	(France) Julie Belgraver	(Belgium) Lara Salden (France) Camille Sireix	7–6^{(4)}, 6–2
Loss	1–1	Aug 2018	ITF Rotterdam, Netherlands	W15	Clay	(Netherlands) Dewi Dijkman	(Netherlands) Suzan Lamens (Belarus) Sviatlana Pirazhenka	3–6, 6–4, [5–10]
Loss	1–2	Jul 2019	ITF Cancún, Mexico	W15	Hard	(Netherlands) Dewi Dijkman	(Brazil) Thaisa Grana Pedretti (Mexico) María Portillo Ramírez	5–7, 3–6
Loss	1–3	Oct 2019	ITF Tabarka, Tunisia	W15	Clay	(Russia) Anastasia Pribylova	(Italy) Giulia Crescenzi (Italy) Aurora Zantedeschi	7–5, 6–7^{(4)}, [8–10]
Win	2–3	Nov 2019	ITF Solarino, Italy	W15	Carpet	(United Kingdom) Anna Popescu	(Italy) Maria Masini (Italy) Anastasia Piangerelli	6–1, 6–1
Win	3–3	Mar 2021	ITF Monastir, Tunisia	W15	Hard	(Russia) Anastasia Pribylova	(Japan) Rina Saigo (Japan) Yukina Saigo	6–3, 6–1
Win	4–3	Mar 2021	ITF Monastir, Tunisia	W15	Hard	(Russia) Anastasia Pribylova	(Finland) Anastasia Kulikova (France) Yasmine Mansouri	6–3, 6–1
Win	5–3	Apr 2021	ITF Monastir, Tunisia	W15	Hard	(Russia) Anastasia Pribylova	(Australia) Alexandra Osborne (Mexico) Andrea Renée Villarreal	6–3, 6–1
Loss	5–4	Apr 2021	ITF Cairo, Egypt	W15	Clay	(Netherlands) Merel Hoedt	(Russia) Elina Avanesyan (Russia) Maria Timofeeva	6–1, 4–6, [8–10]
Win	6–4	Feb 2022	ITF Sharm El Sheikh, Egypt	W25	Hard	(Lithuania) Justina Mikulskytė	(Romania) Irina Fetecău (Switzerland) Simona Waltert	6–1, 6–2
Loss	6–5	Feb 2022	ITF Santo Domingo, Dominican Republic	W25	Hard	(Netherlands) Jasmijn Gimbrère	(United States) Anna Rogers (United States) Christina Rosca	2–6, 2–6
Win	7–5	Apr 2022	Open de Seine-et-Marne, France	W60	Hard (i)	(Lithuania) Justina Mikulskytė	(Russia) Sofya Lansere (Russia) Oksana Selekhmeteva	6–4, 6–2
Loss	7–6	Apr 2022	ITF Nottingham, United Kingdom	W25	Hard	(Romania) Ioana Loredana Roșca	(Hong Kong) Eudice Chong (Hong Kong) Cody Wong	2–6, 3–6
Loss	7–7	May 2022	ITF Platja d'Aro, Spain	W25	Clay	(Ukraine) Valeriya Strakhova	(Spain) Ángela Fita Boluda (Venezuela) Andrea Gámiz	4–6, 6–3, [3–10]
Win	8–7	Jul 2022	ITF Hague, Netherlands	W25	Clay	(Netherlands) Jasmijn Gimbrère	(United States) Nikki Redelijk (Netherlands) Bente Spee	6–2, 6–4
Loss	8–8	Jul 2022	Open Araba en Femenino, Spain	W60	Hard	(Lithuania) Justina Mikulskytė	(Russia) Maria Bondarenko (Romania) Ioana Loredana Roșca	6–4, 4–6, [9–11]
Loss	8–9	Jul 2022	ITF Nottingham, UK	W25	Hard	(Netherlands) Jasmijn Gimbrère	(Chinese Taipei) Lee Pei-chi (Chinese Taipei) Wu Fang-hsien	3–6, 2–6
Loss	8–10	Oct 2022	Monastir Open, Tunisia	W60	Hard	(Netherlands) Suzan Lamens	(Indonesia) Priska Madelyn Nugroho (China) Wei Sijia	3–6, 2–6
Loss	8–11	Feb 2023	GB Pro-Series Bath, UK	W25	Hard (i)	(United Kingdom) Emily Appleton	(United Kingdom) Lauryn John-Baptiste (Slovakia) Katarína Strešnaková	6–7^{(4)}, 4–6
Win	9–11	May 2023	ITF Bodrum, Turkey	W60	Clay	(Romania) Oana Gavrilă	(Turkey) Ayla Aksu (United Kingdom) Harriet Dart	6–4, 7–6^{(3)}
Loss	9–12	Jul 2023	ITF The Hague, Netherlands	W40	Clay	(Netherlands) Jasmijn Gimbrère	(France) Kristina Mladenovic (Netherlands) Arantxa Rus	4–6, 0–6
Loss	9–13	Aug 2023	Internazionali di Cordenons, Italy	W60	Clay	(Netherlands) Eva Vedder	(Italy) Angelica Moratelli (Italy) Camilla Rosatello	6–0, 2–6, [5–10]
Loss	9–14	Aug 2023	ITF Oldenzaal, Netherlands	W40	Clay	(Netherlands) Eva Vedder	(Bulgaria) Gergana Topalova (Latvia) Daniela Vismane	5–7, 6–2, [5–10]
Loss	9–15	Oct 2023	Open Nantes Atlantique, France	W60	Hard (i)	(United Kingdom) Emily Appleton	(United Kingdom) Ali Collins (United Kingdom) Lily Miyazaki	6–7^{(4)}, 2–6
Loss	9–16	Nov 2023	ITF Pétange, Luxembourg	W40	Hard (i)	(United Kingdom) Ali Collins	(United Kingdom) Alicia Barnett (United Kingdom) Samantha Murray Sharan	7–6^{(4)}, 1–6, [6–10]
Loss	9–17	Jan 2024	ITF Naples, United States	W35	Clay	(Bulgaria) Lia Karatancheva	(United States) Elvina Kalieva (Russia) Maria Kozyreva	0–6, 0–6
Loss	9–18	Feb 2024	ITF Mâcon, France	W50	Hard (i)	(United Kingdom) Madeleine Brooks	(Italy) Silvia Ambrosio (Germany) Lena Papadakis	7–5, 5–7, [7–10]
Win	10–18	Mar 2024	Trnava Indoor, Slovakia	W75	Hard (i)	(United States) Anna Rogers	(Chinese Taipei) Liang En-shuo (China) Tang Qianhui	6–3, 4–6, [12–10]
Win	11–18	Oct 2024	Slovak Open, Slovakia	W75	Hard (i)	(Russia) Elena Pridankina	(Slovakia) Katarína Kužmová (Slovakia) Nina Vargová	7–5, 6–2
Loss	11–19	Oct 2024	GB Pro-Series Glasgow, UK	W75	Hard (i)	(Georgia (country)) Mariam Bolkvadze	(United Kingdom) Jodie Burrage (United Kingdom) Freya Christie	4–6, 6–3, [5–10]
Win	12–19	Oct 2024	Hamburg Ladies Cup, Germany	W75	Hard (i)	(United Kingdom) Madeleine Brooks	(India) Riya Bhatia (Netherlands) Lian Tran	6–3, 6–2
Loss	12–20	Nov 2024	Ismaning Open, Germany	W75	Carpet (i)	(France) Carole Monnet	(Czech Republic) Aneta Kučmová (Czech Republic) Aneta Laboutková	6–4, 4–6, [7–10]
Win	13–20	Nov 2024	Trnava Indoor, Slovakia	W75	Hard (i)	(United Kingdom) Madeleine Brooks	(Czech Republic) Anastasia Dețiuc (Czech Republic) Aneta Kučmová	7–6^{(5)}, 6–1
Loss	13–21	Dec 2024	Dubai Tennis Challenge, United Arab Emirates	W100	Hard	(Russia) Elena Pridankina	(Czech Republic) Anastasia Dețiuc (Russia) Anastasia Tikhonova	3–6, 7–6^{(7)}, [8–10]
Loss	13–22	Feb 2025	AK Ladies Open, Germany	W75	Carpet (i)	(United Kingdom) Emily Appleton	(Belgium) Marie Benoît (Slovenia) Dalila Jakupović	5–7, 6–7^{(6)}
Win	14–22	Mar 2025	Trnava Indoor, Slovakia	W75	Hard (i)	(Russia) Elena Pridankina	(Belgium) Magali Kempen (France) Jessika Ponchet	6–2, 6–3
Loss	14–23	Jan 2026	ITF Fujairah Championships, UAE	W100	Hard	(Russia) Elena Pridankina	(United Kingdom) Harriet Dart (United Kingdom) Maia Lumsden	1–6, 0–6
