= Open de Seine-et-Marne =

Engie Open de Seine-et-Marne
- 2024 Open de Seine-et-Marne

ITF Women's Tour
- Event name: Open 3C de Seine-et-Marne (2023–); Engie Open de Seine-et-Marne (2016–2022); Open GDF Suez Seine-et-Marne (2013–2015)
- Location: Croissy-Beaubourg, France
- Venue: Ligue de Seine-et-Marne
- Category: ITF Women's Circuit
- Surface: Hard (indoor)
- Draw: 32S/32Q/16D
- Prize money: $60,000
- Website: engieopenseineetmarne.fr

The Engie Open de Seine-et-Marne is a tournament for professional female tennis players played on indoor hard courts. The event is classified as a $60,000 ITF Women's Circuit tournament and has been held in Croissy-Beaubourg, France, since 2013.

== Past finals ==
=== Singles ===
| Year | Champion | Runner-up | Score |
|---|---|---|---|
| 2026 | (France) Harmony Tan | (France) Amandine Monnot | 6–3, 6–4 |
| 2025 | Not held | | |
| 2024 | (United Kingdom) Lily Miyazaki | (Germany) Mona Barthel | 6–4, 7–5 |
| 2023 | (United Kingdom) Jodie Burrage | (Italy) Lucia Bronzetti | 3–6, 6–4, 6–0 |
| 2022 | (Czech Republic) Linda Nosková | (France) Léolia Jeanjean | 6–3, 6–4 |
| 2020–21 | Tournament cancelled due to the coronavirus pandemic | | |
| 2019 | (Russia) Vitalia Diatchenko | (United States) Robin Anderson | 6–2, 6–3 |
| 2018 | (Russia) Anna Blinkova | (Czech Republic) Karolína Muchová | walkover |
| 2017 | (Russia) Ekaterina Alexandrova | (Netherlands) Richèl Hogenkamp | 6–2, 6–7^{(3–7)}, 6–3 |
| 2016 | (Serbia) Ivana Jorović | (France) Pauline Parmentier | 6–1, 4–6, 6–4 |
| 2015 | (Russia) Margarita Gasparyan | (France) Mathilde Johansson | 6–3, 6–4 |
| 2014 | (France) Claire Feuerstein | (Czech Republic) Renata Voráčová | 6–3, 4–6, 6–4 |
| 2013 | (United Kingdom) Anne Keothavong | (Czech Republic) Sandra Záhlavová | 7–6^{(7–3)}, 6–3 |

=== Doubles ===
| Year | Champions | Runners-up | Score |
|---|---|---|---|
| 2026 | (United Kingdom) Mika Stojsavljevic (Czech Republic) Vendula Valdmannová | (United Kingdom) Madeleine Brooks (United Kingdom) Amelia Rajecki | 7–6^{(7–4)}, 4–6, [10–4] |
| 2025 | Not held | | |
| 2024 | (France) Estelle Cascino (Philippines) Alex Eala | (United Kingdom) Maia Lumsden (France) Jessika Ponchet | 7–5, 7–6^{(7–4)} |
| 2023 | (Belgium) Greet Minnen (Belgium) Yanina Wickmayer | (United Kingdom) Jodie Burrage (Turkey) Berfu Cengiz | 6–4, 6–4 |
| 2022 | (Netherlands) Isabelle Haverlag (Lithuania) Justina Mikulskytė | Sofya Lansere; Oksana Selekhmeteva | 6–4, 6–2 |
| 2020–21 | Tournament cancelled due to the coronavirus pandemic | | |
| 2019 | (United Kingdom) Harriet Dart (Netherlands) Lesley Kerkhove | (United Kingdom) Sarah Beth Grey (United Kingdom) Eden Silva | 6–3, 6–2 |
| 2018 | (Russia) Anna Kalinskaya (Slovakia) Viktória Kužmová | (Czech Republic) Petra Krejsová (Czech Republic) Jesika Malečková | 7–6^{(7–5)}, 6–1 |
| 2017 | (Belarus) Vera Lapko (Russia) Polina Monova | (France) Manon Arcangioli (Poland) Magdalena Fręch | 6–3, 6–4 |
| 2016 | (United Kingdom) Jocelyn Rae (United Kingdom) Anna Smith | (Czech Republic) Lenka Kunčíková (Czech Republic) Karolína Stuchlá | 6–4, 6–1 |
| 2015 | (United Kingdom) Jocelyn Rae (United Kingdom) Anna Smith | (France) Julie Coin (France) Mathilde Johansson | 7–6^{(7–5)}, 7–6^{(7–2)} |
| 2014 | (Russia) Margarita Gasparyan (Ukraine) Lyudmyla Kichenok | (Germany) Kristina Barrois (Greece) Eleni Daniilidou | 6–2, 6–4 |
| 2013 | (Germany) Anna-Lena Friedsam (Belgium) Alison Van Uytvanck | (France) Stéphanie Foretz (Czech Republic) Eva Hrdinová | 6–3, 6–4 |
