= Croissy-Beaubourg =

- Commune
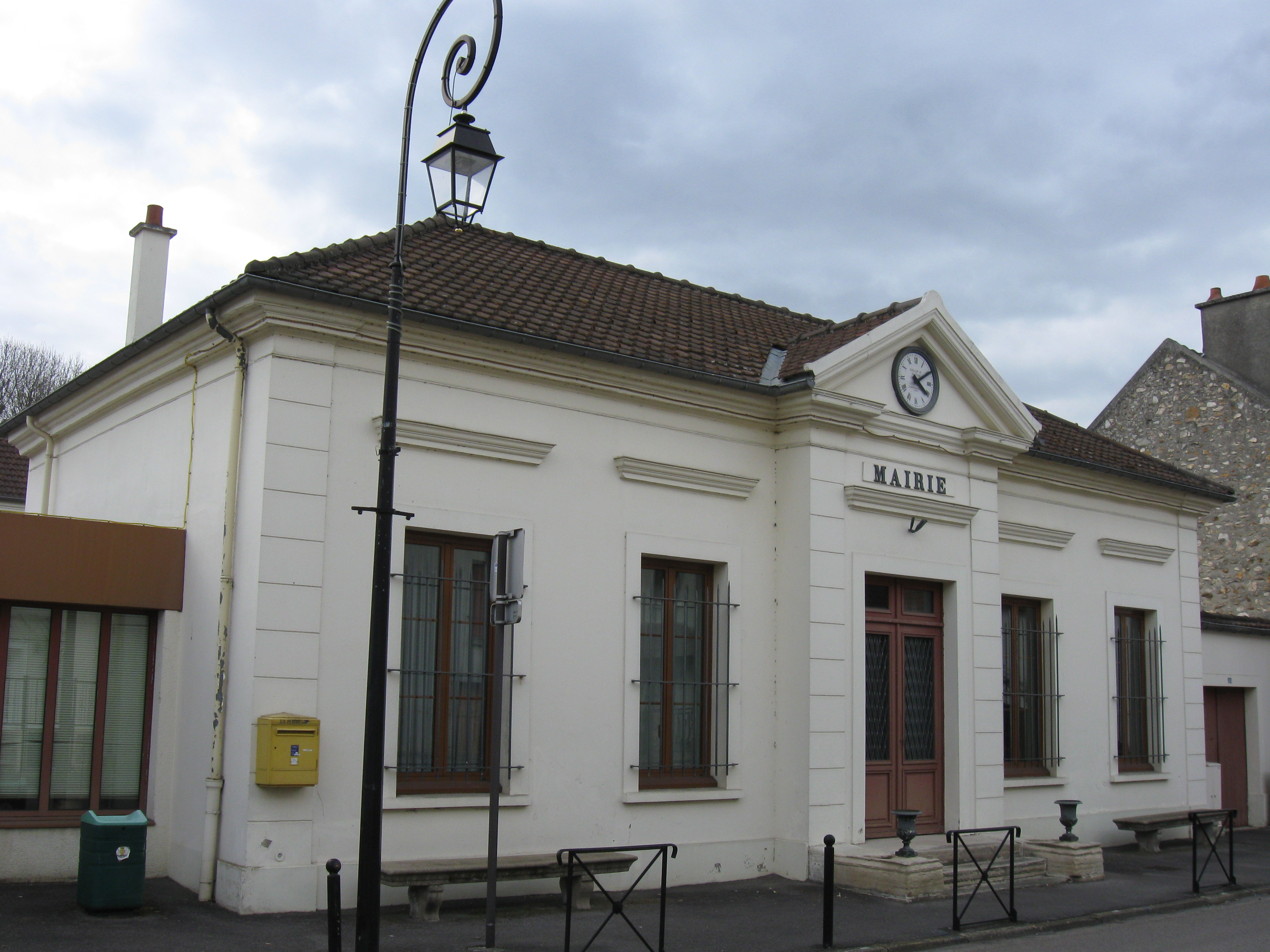
- The town hall in Croissy-Beaubourg

- Coat of arms
- Location of Croissy-Beaubourg
- Location within France Location within Île-de-France (region)
- Coordinates: 48°49′45″N 2°39′38″E
- Country: France
- Region: Île-de-France
- Department: Seine-et-Marne
- Arrondissement: Torcy
- Canton: Champs-sur-Marne
- Intercommunality: CA Paris - Vallée de la Marne

Government
  - Mayor (2024–2026): Michael Gaillard
- Area^{1}: 11.63 km^{2} (4.49 sq mi)
- Highest elevation: 116 m (381 ft)
- Lowest elevation: 87 m (285 ft)
- Population (2023): 2,018
  - Density: 173.5/km^{2} (449.4/sq mi)
- Time zone: UTC+01:00 (CET)
  - Summer (DST): UTC+02:00 (CEST)
- INSEE/Postal code: 77146 /77183
- ^{1} French Land Register data, which excludes lakes, ponds, glaciers > 1 km^{2} (0.386 sq mi or 247 acres) and river estuaries.

Croissy-Beaubourg (French pronunciation: [kʁwasi bobuːʁ]) is a French commune located in the Seine-et-Marne département, in the Île-de-France région.

== Geography ==
The village is located 3 km in the South of Torcy. It's around 1 163 ha, and among which, 600 are from forests.

=== Hydrography ===
There is one river in the village, the channel No. 1 on the village of Pontcarré (2.2 km length) which merge with the Morbras. It passes on Croissy-Beaubourg on a distance of 0.02 km.

There are several ponds in the village among which two older stanks, the Croissy one and the Beaubourg one. They were probably created during 17th century for the castle. It's here that starts the Maubuée, a Marne's affluent.

=== Communication and transport ===
There are two different lines of bus in the village: 321, 421. The A4 Motorway passes on the North, with an interchange (10.1 Val Maubué Sud) in the village.

There are also 4 district roads: the D406, D1406, D10P and D128.

== Population ==
Historical population
Year	Pop.	±% p.a.
1968	231	—
1975	957	+22.51%
1982	1,555	+7.18%
1990	2,396	+5.55%
1999	2,236	−0.76%
2007	2,077	−0.92%
2012	2,005	−0.70%
2017	1,987	−0.18%
2023	2,018	+0.26%
Source: INSEE

Inhabitants of Croissy-Beaubourg are called Croisséens in French.

== Education ==
There are two public schools in the commune, École maternelle Alfred Chartier (preschool) and École élémentaire Les Lions de Beaubourg (elementary school).

Collège du Segrais (public junior high school) is in nearby Lognes. Lycée Jean Moulin (public senior high school/sixth-form college) is in nearby Torcy. Additional public senior highs/sixth-forms include Lycée Maurice Rondeau in Bussy-Saint-Georges and Lycée polyvalent René Cassin in Noisiel.

There are two private schools in nearby Lagny-sur-Marne, École Saint Joseph de Cluny (preschool and elementary school) and Ensemble scolaire Saint Laurent et La Paix Notre Dame.

University of Marne-la-Vallée provides university education in the area.

== See also ==
- Communes of the Seine-et-Marne department
