= 2019 ITF Women's World Tennis Tour (January–March) =

The 2019 ITF Women's World Tennis Tour is the 2019 edition of the second tier tour for women's professional tennis. It is organised by the International Tennis Federation and is a tier below the WTA Tour. The ITF Women's World Tennis Tour includes tournaments with prize money ranging from $15,000 up to $100,000.

== Key ==
Category
W100 tournaments
W80 tournaments
W60 tournaments
W25 tournaments
W15 tournaments

== Month ==
=== January ===
Week of	Tournament	Winner	Runners-up	Semifinalists	Quarterfinalists
December 31	City of Playford Tennis International; Playford, Australia; Hard; W25; Singles and doubles draws	(Russia) Anna Kalinskaya; 6–4, 6–4	(Kazakhstan) Elena Rybakina	(France) Chloé Paquet (United Kingdom) Katie Swan	(Spain) Aliona Bolsova Zadoinov (Belgium) Maryna Zanevska (Australia) Kaylah McPhee (United Kingdom) Gabriella Taylor
December 31	City of Playford Tennis International; Playford, Australia; Hard; W25; Singles and doubles draws	(Italy) Giulia Gatto-Monticone (Italy) Anastasia Grymalska; 6–2, 6–3	(Australia) Amber Marshall (Switzerland) Lulu Sun	(France) Chloé Paquet (United Kingdom) Katie Swan	(Spain) Aliona Bolsova Zadoinov (Belgium) Maryna Zanevska (Australia) Kaylah McPhee (United Kingdom) Gabriella Taylor
December 31	ITF Women's Circuit – Hong Kong; Hong Kong; Hard; W25; Singles and doubles draws	(Ukraine) Daria Lopatetska; 6–4, 6–2	(Czech Republic) Barbora Štefková	(Chinese Taipei) Liang En-shuo (Czech Republic) Monika Kilnarová	(Greece) Valentini Grammatikopoulou (Japan) Moyuka Uchijima (Japan) Junri Namigata (Japan) Mai Minokoshi
December 31	ITF Women's Circuit – Hong Kong; Hong Kong; Hard; W25; Singles and doubles draws	(Netherlands) Michaëlla Krajicek (Czech Republic) Barbora Štefková; 6–4, 6–7^{(3–7)}, [12–10]	(Chinese Taipei) Chen Pei-hsuan (Chinese Taipei) Wu Fang-hsien	(Chinese Taipei) Liang En-shuo (Czech Republic) Monika Kilnarová	(Greece) Valentini Grammatikopoulou (Japan) Moyuka Uchijima (Japan) Junri Namigata (Japan) Mai Minokoshi
January 7	ITF Women's Circuit – Hong Kong; Hong Kong; Hard; W25; Singles and doubles draws	(Ukraine) Daria Lopatetska; 6–4, 6–3	(China) Ma Shuyue	(Turkey) Çağla Büyükakçay (Japan) Chihiro Muramatsu	(Japan) Mai Minokoshi (Sweden) Jacqueline Cabaj Awad (Japan) Risa Ozaki (Czech Republic) Barbora Štefková
January 7	ITF Women's Circuit – Hong Kong; Hong Kong; Hard; W25; Singles and doubles draws	(Chinese Taipei) Chen Pei-hsuan (Chinese Taipei) Wu Fang-hsien; 6–3, 6–3	(Japan) Robu Kajitani (Japan) Hiroko Kuwata	(Turkey) Çağla Büyükakçay (Japan) Chihiro Muramatsu	(Japan) Mai Minokoshi (Sweden) Jacqueline Cabaj Awad (Japan) Risa Ozaki (Czech Republic) Barbora Štefková
January 7	Fort-de-France, Martinique, France; Hard; W15; Singles and doubles draws	(Montenegro) Vladica Babić; 6–4, 6–2	(France) Alice Tubello	(Switzerland) Karin Kennel (United Kingdom) Emily Appleton	(Mexico) Ana Sofía Sánchez (Australia) Alexandra Osborne (United Kingdom) Aleksandra Pitak (Greece) Eleni Kordolaimi
January 7	Fort-de-France, Martinique, France; Hard; W15; Singles and doubles draws	(Greece) Eleni Kordolaimi (France) Alice Tubello; 6–3, 5–7, [10–4]	(United Kingdom) Emily Appleton (United States) Dalayna Hewitt	(Switzerland) Karin Kennel (United Kingdom) Emily Appleton	(Mexico) Ana Sofía Sánchez (Australia) Alexandra Osborne (United Kingdom) Aleksandra Pitak (Greece) Eleni Kordolaimi
January 7	Monastir, Tunisia; Hard; W15; Singles and doubles draws	(Russia) Anastasiya Komardina; 6–4, 6–1	(Italy) Angelica Moratelli	(Spain) Claudia Hoste Ferrer (Czech Republic) Anna Sisková	(France) Vinciane Rémy (Poland) Paula Kania (Czech Republic) Karolína Beránková (Sweden) Mirjam Björklund
January 7	Monastir, Tunisia; Hard; W15; Singles and doubles draws	(Czech Republic) Karolína Beránková (Russia) Taisya Pachkaleva; 6–2, 6–3	(Germany) Ruxandra Schech (Germany) Jantje Tilbürger	(Spain) Claudia Hoste Ferrer (Czech Republic) Anna Sisková	(France) Vinciane Rémy (Poland) Paula Kania (Czech Republic) Karolína Beránková (Sweden) Mirjam Björklund
January 14	Petit-Bourg, Guadeloupe, France; Hard; W25; Singles and doubles draws	(Poland) Urszula Radwańska; 6–1, 2–6, 6–1	(Mexico) Ana Sofía Sánchez	(United States) Quinn Gleason (France) Alizé Lim	(Serbia) Natalija Kostić (United States) Rasheeda McAdoo (United Kingdom) Jodie Burrage (France) Kélia Le Bihan
January 14	Petit-Bourg, Guadeloupe, France; Hard; W25; Singles and doubles draws	(United States) Quinn Gleason (Brazil) Luisa Stefani; 7–5, 6–4	(Montenegro) Vladica Babić (Netherlands) Rosalie van der Hoek	(United States) Quinn Gleason (France) Alizé Lim	(Serbia) Natalija Kostić (United States) Rasheeda McAdoo (United Kingdom) Jodie Burrage (France) Kélia Le Bihan
January 14	Singapore; Hard; W25; Singles and doubles draws	(India) Ankita Raina; 6–3, 6–2	(Netherlands) Arantxa Rus	(Belgium) Greet Minnen (Switzerland) Conny Perrin	(Austria) Barbara Haas (Netherlands) Richèl Hogenkamp (Japan) Kurumi Nara (Uzbekistan) Sabina Sharipova
January 14	Singapore; Hard; W25; Singles and doubles draws	(Netherlands) Quirine Lemoine (Netherlands) Arantxa Rus; 6–2, 6–4	(Chinese Taipei) Chen Pei-hsuan (Chinese Taipei) Wu Fang-hsien	(Belgium) Greet Minnen (Switzerland) Conny Perrin	(Austria) Barbara Haas (Netherlands) Richèl Hogenkamp (Japan) Kurumi Nara (Uzbekistan) Sabina Sharipova
January 14	Daytona Beach, United States; Clay; W25; Singles and doubles draws	(Hungary) Anna Bondár; 6–7^{(3–7)}, 7–6^{(7–5)}, 7–5	(Canada) Françoise Abanda	(Mexico) Renata Zarazúa (United States) Grace Min	(United States) Louisa Chirico (Switzerland) Ylena In-Albon (Netherlands) Cindy Burger (Belgium) Marie Benoît
January 14	Daytona Beach, United States; Clay; W25; Singles and doubles draws	(Hungary) Anna Bondár (Norway) Ulrikke Eikeri; 6–3, 5–7, [11–9]	(United States) Hailey Baptiste (United States) Emina Bektas	(Mexico) Renata Zarazúa (United States) Grace Min	(United States) Louisa Chirico (Switzerland) Ylena In-Albon (Netherlands) Cindy Burger (Belgium) Marie Benoît
January 14	Monastir, Tunisia; Hard; W15; Singles and doubles draws	(Russia) Anastasiya Komardina; 6–1, 6–0	(Switzerland) Fiona Ganz	(Italy) Lucia Bronzetti (Sweden) Mirjam Björklund	(Poland) Paula Kania (Turkey) İpek Soylu (Kazakhstan) Gozal Ainitdinova (Czech Republic) Karolína Beránková
January 14	Monastir, Tunisia; Hard; W15; Singles and doubles draws	(Turkey) İpek Soylu (China) Zhang Ying; 6–3, 6–3	(Spain) Claudia Hoste Ferrer (Bulgaria) Julia Terziyska	(Italy) Lucia Bronzetti (Sweden) Mirjam Björklund	(Poland) Paula Kania (Turkey) İpek Soylu (Kazakhstan) Gozal Ainitdinova (Czech Republic) Karolína Beránková
January 14	Antalya, Turkey; Clay; W15; Singles and doubles draws	(Turkey) İpek Öz vs (Kazakhstan) Zhibek Kulambayeva; Singles final was cancelled due to poor weather		(United Kingdom) Francesca Jones (Japan) Naho Sato	(Hungary) Vanda Lukács (Japan) Kanako Morisaki (Japan) Ayaka Okuno (Israel) Vlada Ekshibarova
January 14	Antalya, Turkey; Clay; W15; Singles and doubles draws	(Japan) Kanako Morisaki (Japan) Ayaka Okuno; 6–2, 6–2	(Israel) Vlada Ekshibarova (Bulgaria) Julia Stamatova	(United Kingdom) Francesca Jones (Japan) Naho Sato	(Hungary) Vanda Lukács (Japan) Kanako Morisaki (Japan) Ayaka Okuno (Israel) Vlada Ekshibarova
January 21	Burnie International; Burnie, Australia; Hard; W60; Singles – Doubles	(Australia) Belinda Woolcock; 7–6^{(7–3)}, 7–6^{(7–4)}	(Spain) Paula Badosa Gibert	(Spain) Sara Sorribes Tormo (Georgia (country)) Ekaterine Gorgodze	(Spain) Georgina García Pérez (China) Wang Xiyu (Australia) Lizette Cabrera (Spain) Sílvia Soler Espinosa
January 21	Burnie International; Burnie, Australia; Hard; W60; Singles – Doubles	(Australia) Ellen Perez (Australia) Arina Rodionova; 6–4, 6–3	(Russia) Irina Khromacheva (Belgium) Maryna Zanevska	(Spain) Sara Sorribes Tormo (Georgia (country)) Ekaterine Gorgodze	(Spain) Georgina García Pérez (China) Wang Xiyu (Australia) Lizette Cabrera (Spain) Sílvia Soler Espinosa
January 21	Open Andrézieux-Bouthéon 42; Andrézieux-Bouthéon, France; Hard (indoor); W60; Singles – Doubles	(Slovakia) Rebecca Šramková; 6–2, 6–7^{(4–7)}, 6–2	(France) Audrey Albié	(Slovenia) Polona Hercog (Bulgaria) Isabella Shinikova	(France) Myrtille Georges (France) Julie Gervais (Italy) Giulia Gatto-Monticone (Netherlands) Bibiane Schoofs
January 21	Open Andrézieux-Bouthéon 42; Andrézieux-Bouthéon, France; Hard (indoor); W60; Singles – Doubles	(Sweden) Cornelia Lister (Czech Republic) Renata Voráčová; 6–1, 6–2	(Romania) Andreea Mitu (Romania) Elena-Gabriela Ruse	(Slovenia) Polona Hercog (Bulgaria) Isabella Shinikova	(France) Myrtille Georges (France) Julie Gervais (Italy) Giulia Gatto-Monticone (Netherlands) Bibiane Schoofs
January 21	Kazan, Russia; Hard (indoor); W25; Singles and doubles draws	(Russia) Varvara Flink; 6–2, ret.	(Russia) Anastasia Gasanova	(Hungary) Dalma Gálfi (Czech Republic) Barbora Štefková	(Russia) Vlada Koval (Poland) Katarzyna Kawa (Russia) Valeriya Yushchenko (Serbia) Natalija Kostić
January 21	Kazan, Russia; Hard (indoor); W25; Singles and doubles draws	(Germany) Vivian Heisen (Ukraine) Ganna Poznikhirenko; 6–4, 6–3	(Russia) Alena Fomina (Russia) Ekaterina Yashina	(Hungary) Dalma Gálfi (Czech Republic) Barbora Štefková	(Russia) Vlada Koval (Poland) Katarzyna Kawa (Russia) Valeriya Yushchenko (Serbia) Natalija Kostić
January 21	Singapore; Hard; W25; Singles and doubles draws	(China) Zhu Lin; 6–2, 6–3	(South Korea) Han Na-lae	(Serbia) Ivana Jorović (China) Zhang Kailin	(Netherlands) Lesley Kerkhove (Netherlands) Richèl Hogenkamp (Austria) Barbara Haas (Bulgaria) Elitsa Kostova
January 21	Singapore; Hard; W25; Singles and doubles draws	(New Zealand) Paige Hourigan (Indonesia) Aldila Sutjiadi; 6–2, 6–3	(Hong Kong) Eudice Chong (Hong Kong) Zhang Ling	(Serbia) Ivana Jorović (China) Zhang Kailin	(Netherlands) Lesley Kerkhove (Netherlands) Richèl Hogenkamp (Austria) Barbara Haas (Bulgaria) Elitsa Kostova
January 21	Plantation, United States; Clay; W25; Singles and doubles draws	(United States) Hailey Baptiste; 7–5, 6–7^{(6–8)}, 6–2	(Hungary) Anna Bondár	(Norway) Ulrikke Eikeri (Colombia) Camila Osorio	(Belarus) Olga Govortsova (United States) Ashley Kratzer (Switzerland) Ylena In-Albon (United States) Sophie Chang
January 21	Plantation, United States; Clay; W25; Singles and doubles draws	(Chinese Taipei) Hsieh Yu-chieh (Chinese Taipei) Lee Pei-chi; 6–1, 6–4	(Belarus) Olga Govortsova (United States) Jada Robinson	(Norway) Ulrikke Eikeri (Colombia) Camila Osorio	(Belarus) Olga Govortsova (United States) Ashley Kratzer (Switzerland) Ylena In-Albon (United States) Sophie Chang
January 21	Sharm El Sheikh, Egypt; Hard; W15; Singles and doubles draws	(Belgium) Magali Kempen; 5–7, 6–3, 6–3	(Switzerland) Simona Waltert	(Czech Republic) Anna Sisková (Finland) Oona Orpana	(Czech Republic) Karolína Vlčková (Egypt) Mayar Sherif (Austria) Melanie Klaffner (Switzerland) Fiona Ganz
January 21	Sharm El Sheikh, Egypt; Hard; W15; Singles and doubles draws	(Belgium) Magali Kempen (Austria) Melanie Klaffner; 6–4, 6–1	(Sweden) Jacqueline Cabaj Awad (Switzerland) Fiona Ganz	(Czech Republic) Anna Sisková (Finland) Oona Orpana	(Czech Republic) Karolína Vlčková (Egypt) Mayar Sherif (Austria) Melanie Klaffner (Switzerland) Fiona Ganz
January 21	Stuttgart, Germany; Hard (indoor); W15; Singles and doubles draws	(Romania) Laura-Ioana Andrei; 6–3, 6–1	(Finland) Anastasia Kulikova	(Austria) Sinja Kraus (Latvia) Daniela Vismane	(Switzerland) Joanne Züger (Germany) Julia Wachaczyk (Hungary) Ágnes Bukta (Luxembourg) Eléonora Molinaro
January 21	Stuttgart, Germany; Hard (indoor); W15; Singles and doubles draws	(Romania) Laura-Ioana Andrei (Germany) Julia Wachaczyk; 7–5, 6–0	(Luxembourg) Eléonora Molinaro (Latvia) Daniela Vismane	(Austria) Sinja Kraus (Latvia) Daniela Vismane	(Switzerland) Joanne Züger (Germany) Julia Wachaczyk (Hungary) Ágnes Bukta (Luxembourg) Eléonora Molinaro
January 21	Manacor, Spain; Clay; W15; Singles and doubles draws	(Romania) Ioana Loredana Roșca; 6–2, 6–0	(Spain) Rebeka Masarova	(Russia) Anna Ureke (Spain) Júlia Payola	(Bulgaria) Aleksandrina Naydenova (Spain) Claudia Hoste Ferrer (Japan) Ayumi Koshiishi (United Kingdom) Amanda Carreras
January 21	Manacor, Spain; Clay; W15; Singles and doubles draws	(Spain) Yvonne Cavallé Reimers (Spain) Rebeka Masarova; 6–4, 6–3	(Germany) Irina Cantos Siemers (Spain) Júlia Payola	(Russia) Anna Ureke (Spain) Júlia Payola	(Bulgaria) Aleksandrina Naydenova (Spain) Claudia Hoste Ferrer (Japan) Ayumi Koshiishi (United Kingdom) Amanda Carreras
January 21	Monastir, Tunisia; Hard; W15; Singles and doubles draws	(Sweden) Mirjam Björklund; 6–2, 7–5	(Kazakhstan) Gozal Ainitdinova	(Turkey) İpek Soylu (Italy) Angelica Moratelli	(Czech Republic) Karolína Beránková (Russia) Natalia Orlova (France) Lou Brouleau (Italy) Lucia Bronzetti
January 21	Monastir, Tunisia; Hard; W15; Singles and doubles draws	(Russia) Ulyana Ayzatulina (Serbia) Tamara Malešević; 6–4, 6–2	(United States) Madison Westby (United States) Amy Zhu	(Turkey) İpek Soylu (Italy) Angelica Moratelli	(Czech Republic) Karolína Beránková (Russia) Natalia Orlova (France) Lou Brouleau (Italy) Lucia Bronzetti
January 21	Antalya, Turkey; Clay; W15; Singles and doubles draws	Tournament was cancelled after the completion of the first round due to ongoing poor weather			
January 28	Dow Tennis Classic; Midland, United States; Hard (indoor); W100; Singles – Doubles	(United States) Caty McNally; 6–2, 6–4	(United States) Jessica Pegula	(Sweden) Rebecca Peterson (United States) Robin Anderson	(United States) Kristie Ahn (United States) Madison Brengle (United States) Christina McHale (Belgium) Yanina Wickmayer
January 28	Dow Tennis Classic; Midland, United States; Hard (indoor); W100; Singles – Doubles	(Belarus) Olga Govortsova (Russia) Valeria Savinykh; 6–4, 6–0	(United States) Cori Gauff (United States) Ann Li	(Sweden) Rebecca Peterson (United States) Robin Anderson	(United States) Kristie Ahn (United States) Madison Brengle (United States) Christina McHale (Belgium) Yanina Wickmayer
January 28	Launceston International; Launceston, Australia; Hard; W60; Singles – Doubles	(Kazakhstan) Elena Rybakina; 7–5, 3–3, ret.	(Russia) Irina Khromacheva	(Belgium) Maryna Zanevska (Australia) Arina Rodionova	(Chinese Taipei) Chang Kai-chen (Argentina) Nadia Podoroska (Australia) Abbie Myers (Japan) Nao Hibino
January 28	Launceston International; Launceston, Australia; Hard; W60; Singles – Doubles	(Chinese Taipei) Chang Kai-chen (Chinese Taipei) Hsu Ching-wen; 6–2, 6–4	(Australia) Alexandra Bozovic (Australia) Isabelle Wallace	(Belgium) Maryna Zanevska (Australia) Arina Rodionova	(Chinese Taipei) Chang Kai-chen (Argentina) Nadia Podoroska (Australia) Abbie Myers (Japan) Nao Hibino
January 28	Jodhpur, India; Hard; W25; Singles and doubles draws	(Japan) Miharu Imanishi; 6–3, 3–6, 6–3	(United Kingdom) Jodie Burrage	(Japan) Eri Hozumi (Japan) Miyabi Inoue	(Japan) Hiroko Kuwata (Oman) Fatma Al-Nabhani (Georgia (country)) Sofia Shapatava (Latvia) Diāna Marcinkēviča
January 28	Jodhpur, India; Hard; W25; Singles and doubles draws	(Japan) Mana Ayukawa (Japan) Haruka Kaji; 7–6^{(7–4)}, 4–6, [10–5]	(Japan) Eri Hozumi (Japan) Miyabi Inoue	(Japan) Eri Hozumi (Japan) Miyabi Inoue	(Japan) Hiroko Kuwata (Oman) Fatma Al-Nabhani (Georgia (country)) Sofia Shapatava (Latvia) Diāna Marcinkēviča
January 28	Sharm El Sheikh, Egypt; Hard; W15; Singles and doubles draws	(Switzerland) Simona Waltert; 6–1, 6–3	(Finland) Oona Orpana	(Czech Republic) Anastasia Dețiuc (Switzerland) Fiona Ganz	(Germany) Lisa Ponomar (Slovakia) Barbora Matúšová (Russia) Anna Pribylova (Egypt) Mayar Sherif
January 28	Sharm El Sheikh, Egypt; Hard; W15; Singles and doubles draws	(Czech Republic) Anastasia Dețiuc (Finland) Oona Orpana; 6–0, 6–4	(Croatia) Mariana Dražić (Norway) Malene Helgø	(Czech Republic) Anastasia Dețiuc (Switzerland) Fiona Ganz	(Germany) Lisa Ponomar (Slovakia) Barbora Matúšová (Russia) Anna Pribylova (Egypt) Mayar Sherif
January 28	Manacor, Spain; Clay; W15; Singles and doubles draws	(Spain) Marina Bassols Ribera; 6–3, 6–4	(Romania) Ioana Loredana Roșca	(Spain) Claudia Hoste Ferrer (Spain) Rosa Vicens Mas	(Bulgaria) Aleksandrina Naydenova (Germany) Anne Schäfer (Spain) Júlia Payola (Spain) Rebeka Masarova
January 28	Manacor, Spain; Clay; W15; Singles and doubles draws	(Spain) Claudia Hoste Ferrer (Spain) Rebeka Masarova; 7–5, 6–3	(Japan) Rina Saigo (Japan) Yukina Saigo	(Spain) Claudia Hoste Ferrer (Spain) Rosa Vicens Mas	(Bulgaria) Aleksandrina Naydenova (Germany) Anne Schäfer (Spain) Júlia Payola (Spain) Rebeka Masarova
January 28	Monastir, Tunisia; Hard; W15; Singles and doubles draws	(France) Lou Brouleau; 3–6, 6–0, 6–3	(France) Estelle Cascino	(Netherlands) Indy de Vroome (France) Léa Tholey	(Russia) Varvara Gracheva (Germany) Emily Seibold (Norway) Melanie Stokke (Romania) Miriam Bulgaru
January 28	Monastir, Tunisia; Hard; W15; Singles and doubles draws	(United States) Mary Closs (China) Mu Shouna; 7–5, 6–7^{(4–7)}, [12–10]	(Italy) Giulia Crescenzi (Italy) Corinna Dentoni	(Netherlands) Indy de Vroome (France) Léa Tholey	(Russia) Varvara Gracheva (Germany) Emily Seibold (Norway) Melanie Stokke (Romania) Miriam Bulgaru
January 28	Antalya, Turkey; Clay; W15; Singles and doubles draws	(Ukraine) Viktoriia Dema; 4–6, 6–3, 6–3	(Latvia) Daniela Vismane	(Romania) Oana Georgeta Simion (China) Cao Siqi	(China) Zheng Wushuang (Germany) Tayisiya Morderger (Kazakhstan) Zhibek Kulambayeva (Romania) Alexandra Damaschin
January 28	Antalya, Turkey; Clay; W15; Singles and doubles draws	(Japan) Kanako Morisaki (Japan) Ayaka Okuno; 7–5, 6–3	(Japan) Haruna Arakawa (Turkey) Doğa Türkmen	(Romania) Oana Georgeta Simion (China) Cao Siqi	(China) Zheng Wushuang (Germany) Tayisiya Morderger (Kazakhstan) Zhibek Kulambayeva (Romania) Alexandra Damaschin

=== February ===
Week of	Tournament	Winner	Runners-up	Semifinalists	Quarterfinalists
February 4	Grenoble, France; Hard (indoor); W25; Singles and doubles draws	(Russia) Vitalia Diatchenko; 6–1, 6–4	(France) Harmony Tan	(Spain) Nuria Párrizas Díaz (Romania) Elena-Gabriela Ruse	(France) Amandine Hesse (Germany) Katharina Hobgarski (Netherlands) Lesley Kerkhove (Belgium) Kimberley Zimmermann
February 4	Grenoble, France; Hard (indoor); W25; Singles and doubles draws	(France) Estelle Cascino (France) Elixane Lechemia; 6–2, 6–2	(Romania) Andreea Mitu (Romania) Elena-Gabriela Ruse	(Spain) Nuria Párrizas Díaz (Romania) Elena-Gabriela Ruse	(France) Amandine Hesse (Germany) Katharina Hobgarski (Netherlands) Lesley Kerkhove (Belgium) Kimberley Zimmermann
February 4	Trnava, Slovakia; Hard (indoor); W25; Singles and doubles draws	(Czech Republic) Lucie Hradecká; 6–4, 3–6, 7–6^{(7–0)}	(Slovakia) Kristína Kučová	(Romania) Alexandra Cadanțu (Czech Republic) Barbora Štefková	(Czech Republic) Tereza Smitková (Serbia) Dejana Radanović (Bulgaria) Elitsa Kostova (Czech Republic) Anastasia Zarycká
February 4	Trnava, Slovakia; Hard (indoor); W25; Singles and doubles draws	(Romania) Elena Bogdan (Bulgaria) Elitsa Kostova; 7–5, 7–6^{(7–5)}	(Slovakia) Michaela Hončová (Ukraine) Ganna Poznikhirenko	(Romania) Alexandra Cadanțu (Czech Republic) Barbora Štefková	(Czech Republic) Tereza Smitková (Serbia) Dejana Radanović (Bulgaria) Elitsa Kostova (Czech Republic) Anastasia Zarycká
February 4	Sharm El Sheikh, Egypt; Hard; W15; Singles and doubles draws	(Egypt) Mayar Sherif; 6–4, 1–6, 6–3	(Switzerland) Simona Waltert	(Russia) Anastasia Pribylova (Russia) Anna Morgina	(Slovakia) Barbora Matúšová (Norway) Malene Helgø (Sweden) Linnéa Malmqvist (United Kingdom) Emily Appleton
February 4	Sharm El Sheikh, Egypt; Hard; W15; Singles and doubles draws	(Croatia) Mariana Dražić (Norway) Malene Helgø; 6–4, 6–3	(Netherlands) Merel Hoedt (Netherlands) Noa Liauw a Fong	(Russia) Anastasia Pribylova (Russia) Anna Morgina	(Slovakia) Barbora Matúšová (Norway) Malene Helgø (Sweden) Linnéa Malmqvist (United Kingdom) Emily Appleton
February 4	Palma Nova, Spain; Clay; W15; Singles and doubles draws	(Spain) Júlia Payola; 6–2, 6–4	(Brazil) Laura Pigossi	(Bulgaria) Aleksandrina Naydenova (Germany) Katharina Hering	(Russia) Daniella Medvedeva (France) Alice Tubello (France) Lucie Wargnier (Italy) Tatiana Pieri
February 4	Palma Nova, Spain; Clay; W15; Singles and doubles draws	(Chinese Taipei) Joanna Garland (Poland) Anna Hertel; 7–5, 6–0	(Venezuela) Luniuska Delgado (Russia) Daniella Medvedeva	(Bulgaria) Aleksandrina Naydenova (Germany) Katharina Hering	(Russia) Daniella Medvedeva (France) Alice Tubello (France) Lucie Wargnier (Italy) Tatiana Pieri
February 4	Monastir, Tunisia; Hard; W15; Singles and doubles draws	(Switzerland) Lara Michel; 6–2, 6–3	(Romania) Miriam Bulgaru	(France) Lou Brouleau (Switzerland) Leonie Küng	(China) You Mi Zhuoma (Poland) Marta Leśniak (France) Théo Gravouil (Germany) Emily Seibold
February 4	Monastir, Tunisia; Hard; W15; Singles and doubles draws	(Poland) Magdalena Hędrzak (Poland) Marta Leśniak; 6–2, 6–2	(France) Vinciane Rémy (France) Marie Témin	(France) Lou Brouleau (Switzerland) Leonie Küng	(China) You Mi Zhuoma (Poland) Marta Leśniak (France) Théo Gravouil (Germany) Emily Seibold
February 4	Antalya, Turkey; Clay; W15; Singles and doubles draws	(Japan) Yuki Naito; 6–2, 3–6, 6–3	(Switzerland) Joanne Züger	(Japan) Haruna Arakawa (Ukraine) Maryna Chernyshova	(Belgium) Eliessa Vanlangendonck (Germany) Tayisiya Morderger (Romania) Andreea Ghițescu (Kazakhstan) Zhibek Kulambayeva
February 4	Antalya, Turkey; Clay; W15; Singles and doubles draws	(Turkey) Cemre Anıl (Romania) Oana Georgeta Simion; 6–2, 6–4	(Ukraine) Maryna Chernyshova (Israel) Vlada Ekshibarova	(Japan) Haruna Arakawa (Ukraine) Maryna Chernyshova	(Belgium) Eliessa Vanlangendonck (Germany) Tayisiya Morderger (Romania) Andreea Ghițescu (Kazakhstan) Zhibek Kulambayeva
February 11	GB Pro-Series Shrewsbury; Shrewsbury, United Kingdom; Hard (indoor); W60; Singles – Doubles	(Russia) Vitalia Diatchenko; 5–7, 6–1, 6–4	(Belgium) Yanina Wickmayer	(France) Harmony Tan (Spain) Aliona Bolsova Zadoinov	(United Kingdom) Maia Lumsden (Czech Republic) Tereza Smitková (France) Amandine Hesse (Belgium) Kimberley Zimmermann
February 11	GB Pro-Series Shrewsbury; Shrewsbury, United Kingdom; Hard (indoor); W60; Singles – Doubles	(Australia) Arina Rodionova (Belgium) Yanina Wickmayer; 6–2, 7–5	(United Kingdom) Freya Christie (Russia) Valeria Savinykh	(France) Harmony Tan (Spain) Aliona Bolsova Zadoinov	(United Kingdom) Maia Lumsden (Czech Republic) Tereza Smitková (France) Amandine Hesse (Belgium) Kimberley Zimmermann
February 11	Trnava, Slovakia; Hard (indoor); W25; Singles and doubles draws	(Bulgaria) Isabella Shinikova; 6–1, 6–3	(Czech Republic) Denisa Allertová	(Romania) Alexandra Cadanțu (Germany) Anna Zaja	(Serbia) Dejana Radanović (Ukraine) Katarina Zavatska (Italy) Jasmine Paolini (Czech Republic) Tereza Martincová
February 11	Trnava, Slovakia; Hard (indoor); W25; Singles and doubles draws	(Romania) Laura-Ioana Andrei (Czech Republic) Anastasia Zarycká; 6–4, 6–3	(Poland) Maja Chwalińska (Czech Republic) Miriam Kolodziejová	(Romania) Alexandra Cadanțu (Germany) Anna Zaja	(Serbia) Dejana Radanović (Ukraine) Katarina Zavatska (Italy) Jasmine Paolini (Czech Republic) Tereza Martincová
February 11	Surprise, United States; Hard; W25; Singles and doubles draws	(Bulgaria) Sesil Karatantcheva; 5–7, 6–3, 6–1	(United States) Cori Gauff	(Belarus) Olga Govortsova (United States) Allie Kiick	(Chinese Taipei) Lee Hua-chen (United States) Ann Li (Chile) Daniela Seguel (United States) Usue Maitane Arconada
February 11	Surprise, United States; Hard; W25; Singles and doubles draws	(United States) Cori Gauff (New Zealand) Paige Hourigan; 6–3, 4–6, [14–12]	(United States) Usue Maitane Arconada (United States) Emina Bektas	(Belarus) Olga Govortsova (United States) Allie Kiick	(Chinese Taipei) Lee Hua-chen (United States) Ann Li (Chile) Daniela Seguel (United States) Usue Maitane Arconada
February 11	Port Pirie, Australia; Hard; W15; Singles and doubles draws	(Switzerland) Lulu Sun; 6–2, 6–3	(United States) Jennifer Elie	(Australia) Bojana Marinkov (Australia) Charlotte Kempenaers-Pocz	(Australia) Alexandra Osborne (Australia) Amber Marshall (Australia) Natasha Russell (Australia) Olivia Symons
February 11	Port Pirie, Australia; Hard; W15; Singles and doubles draws	(New Zealand) Valentina Ivanov (Australia) Amber Marshall; 7–5, 6–2	(Germany) Patricia Böntgen (Australia) Lisa Mays	(Australia) Bojana Marinkov (Australia) Charlotte Kempenaers-Pocz	(Australia) Alexandra Osborne (Australia) Amber Marshall (Australia) Natasha Russell (Australia) Olivia Symons
February 11	Sharm El Sheikh, Egypt; Hard; W15; Singles and doubles draws	(Russia) Anna Morgina; 6–3, 6–2	(Brazil) Laura Pigossi	(United States) Dasha Ivanova (Ukraine) Marianna Zakarlyuk	(Netherlands) Noa Liauw a Fong (Norway) Malene Helgø (Russia) Anastasia Pribylova (China) Guo Shanshan
February 11	Sharm El Sheikh, Egypt; Hard; W15; Singles and doubles draws	(Russia) Anna Morgina (Brazil) Laura Pigossi; 6–2, 6–2	(Belarus) Nika Shytkouskaya (Russia) Anastasia Sukhotina	(United States) Dasha Ivanova (Ukraine) Marianna Zakarlyuk	(Netherlands) Noa Liauw a Fong (Norway) Malene Helgø (Russia) Anastasia Pribylova (China) Guo Shanshan
February 11	Shymkent, Kazakhstan; Hard (indoor); W15; Singles and doubles draws	(Russia) Kamilla Rakhimova; 6–2, 6–3	(Russia) Anastasia Tikhonova	(Russia) Daria Kruzhkova (Kazakhstan) Yekaterina Dmitrichenko	(Russia) Angelina Zhuravleva (Russia) Ekaterina Kazionova (Russia) Vlada Koval (Russia) Anastasiya Komardina
February 11	Shymkent, Kazakhstan; Hard (indoor); W15; Singles and doubles draws	(Russia) Gyulnara Nazarova (Russia) Anna Ukolova; 6–2, 2–6, [10–5]	(Russia) Noel Saidenova (Belarus) Kseniya Yersh	(Russia) Daria Kruzhkova (Kazakhstan) Yekaterina Dmitrichenko	(Russia) Angelina Zhuravleva (Russia) Ekaterina Kazionova (Russia) Vlada Koval (Russia) Anastasiya Komardina
February 11	Monastir, Tunisia; Hard; W15; Singles and doubles draws	(Poland) Marta Leśniak; 2–6, 6–0, 6–0	(Spain) Andrea Lázaro García	(France) Marie Témin (Romania) Cristina Ene	(Norway) Melanie Stokke (United States) Elizabeth Mandlik (Romania) Miriam Bulgaru (France) Alice Ramé
February 11	Monastir, Tunisia; Hard; W15; Singles and doubles draws	(Romania) Miriam Bulgaru (Romania) Cristina Ene; 6–3, 7–6^{(7–5)}	(Spain) Andrea Lázaro García (Greece) Despina Papamichail	(France) Marie Témin (Romania) Cristina Ene	(Norway) Melanie Stokke (United States) Elizabeth Mandlik (Romania) Miriam Bulgaru (France) Alice Ramé
February 11	Antalya, Turkey; Clay; W15; Singles and doubles draws	(Ukraine) Maryna Chernyshova; 7–6^{(7–3)}, 2–6, 6–2	(Japan) Yuki Naito	(Switzerland) Joanne Züger (Italy) Camilla Scala	(Italy) Gaia Sanesi (Slovenia) Pia Čuk (United States) Jessica Ho (Hungary) Vanda Lukács
February 11	Antalya, Turkey; Clay; W15; Singles and doubles draws	(Romania) Karola Bejenaru (Romania) Ioana Gașpar; 6–4, 6–3	(Sweden) Fanny Östlund (Russia) Anna Ureke	(Switzerland) Joanne Züger (Italy) Camilla Scala	(Italy) Gaia Sanesi (Slovenia) Pia Čuk (United States) Jessica Ho (Hungary) Vanda Lukács
February 18	Shimadzu All Japan Indoor Tennis Championships; Kyoto, Japan; Hard (indoor); W60; Singles – Doubles	(Switzerland) Ylena In-Albon; 6–2, 6–3	(China) Zhang Kailin	(Japan) Nao Hibino (United States) Robin Anderson	(Belgium) Greet Minnen (Japan) Miharu Imanishi (Japan) Kyōka Okamura (Japan) Kurumi Nara
February 18	Shimadzu All Japan Indoor Tennis Championships; Kyoto, Japan; Hard (indoor); W60; Singles – Doubles	(Japan) Eri Hozumi (Japan) Moyuka Uchijima; 6–4, 6–3	(Chinese Taipei) Chen Pei-hsuan (Chinese Taipei) Wu Fang-hsien	(Japan) Nao Hibino (United States) Robin Anderson	(Belgium) Greet Minnen (Japan) Miharu Imanishi (Japan) Kyōka Okamura (Japan) Kurumi Nara
February 18	Altenkirchen, Germany; Carpet (indoor); W25; Singles and doubles draws	(China) Ma Shuyue; 6–4, 5–7, 7–5	(Belgium) Maryna Zanevska	(Belgium) Marie Benoît (Poland) Maja Chwalińska	(Switzerland) Susan Bandecchi (France) Shérazad Reix (Italy) Stefania Rubini (Germany) Katharina Hobgarski
February 18	Altenkirchen, Germany; Carpet (indoor); W25; Singles and doubles draws	(Spain) Cristina Bucșa (Netherlands) Rosalie van der Hoek; 5–7, 6–3, [12–10]	(Belgium) Marie Benoît (Poland) Katarzyna Piter	(Belgium) Marie Benoît (Poland) Maja Chwalińska	(Switzerland) Susan Bandecchi (France) Shérazad Reix (Italy) Stefania Rubini (Germany) Katharina Hobgarski
February 18	GB Pro-Series Glasgow; Glasgow, United Kingdom; Hard (indoor); W25; Singles and doubles draws	(France) Jessika Ponchet; 6–3, 6–1	(Georgia (country)) Mariam Bolkvadze	(United Kingdom) Maia Lumsden (Russia) Valeria Savinykh	(Germany) Anna Zaja (France) Audrey Albié (Spain) Nuria Párrizas Díaz (Netherlands) Lesley Kerkhove
February 18	GB Pro-Series Glasgow; Glasgow, United Kingdom; Hard (indoor); W25; Singles and doubles draws	(Netherlands) Lesley Kerkhove (Germany) Anna Zaja; 6–4, 3–6, [10–3]	(United Kingdom) Freya Christie (Croatia) Jana Fett	(United Kingdom) Maia Lumsden (Russia) Valeria Savinykh	(Germany) Anna Zaja (France) Audrey Albié (Spain) Nuria Párrizas Díaz (Netherlands) Lesley Kerkhove
February 18	Rancho Santa Fe, United States; Hard; W25; Singles and doubles draws	(United States) Nicole Gibbs; 6–3, 6–3	(United States) Kristie Ahn	(United States) Usue Maitane Arconada (United States) Ann Li	(United States) Sachia Vickery (Argentina) Nadia Podoroska (United States) Claire Liu (Mexico) Ana Sofía Sánchez
February 18	Rancho Santa Fe, United States; Hard; W25; Singles and doubles draws	(United States) Hayley Carter (United States) Ena Shibahara; 7–5, 6–2	(United States) Francesca Di Lorenzo (United States) Caty McNally	(United States) Usue Maitane Arconada (United States) Ann Li	(United States) Sachia Vickery (Argentina) Nadia Podoroska (United States) Claire Liu (Mexico) Ana Sofía Sánchez
February 18	Perth, Australia; Hard; W15; Singles and doubles draws	(Switzerland) Lulu Sun; 7–6^{(7–1)}, 6–3	(United States) Jennifer Elie	(Australia) Olivia Gadecki (Australia) Amber Marshall	(Australia) Annerly Poulos (Australia) Taylah Lawless (Japan) Haruna Arakawa (Australia) Anastasia Berezov
February 18	Perth, Australia; Hard; W15; Singles and doubles draws	(United States) Jennifer Elie (France) Irina Ramialison; 7–5, 6–4	(Japan) Haine Ogata (Japan) Aiko Yoshitomi	(Australia) Olivia Gadecki (Australia) Amber Marshall	(Australia) Annerly Poulos (Australia) Taylah Lawless (Japan) Haruna Arakawa (Australia) Anastasia Berezov
February 18	Nanchang, China; Clay (indoor); W15; Singles and doubles draws	(China) Lu Jiaxi; 7–6^{(7–3)}, 6–2	(Japan) Mei Yamaguchi	(China) Cao Siqi (China) Sun Xuliu	(South Korea) Park So-hyun (China) Yuan Chengyiyi (China) Guo Meiqi (China) Zheng Wushuang
February 18	Nanchang, China; Clay (indoor); W15; Singles and doubles draws	(China) Cao Siqi (China) Zheng Wushuang; 7–5, 7–6^{(7–4)}	(Hong Kong) Eudice Chong (South Korea) Kim Da-bin	(China) Cao Siqi (China) Sun Xuliu	(South Korea) Park So-hyun (China) Yuan Chengyiyi (China) Guo Meiqi (China) Zheng Wushuang
February 18	Sharm El Sheikh, Egypt; Hard; W15; Singles and doubles draws	(Belgium) Magali Kempen; 6–3, 6–4	(United States) Dasha Ivanova	(Russia) Daria Mishina (Sweden) Linnéa Malmqvist	(Moldova) Anastasia Vdovenco (China) Guo Shanshan (Spain) Alba Carrillo Marín (Switzerland) Valentina Ryser
February 18	Sharm El Sheikh, Egypt; Hard; W15; Singles and doubles draws	(Russia) Ulyana Ayzatulina (Russia) Alina Silich; 7–5, 6–4	(Belgium) Chelsea Vanhoutte (United States) Amber Washington	(Russia) Daria Mishina (Sweden) Linnéa Malmqvist	(Moldova) Anastasia Vdovenco (China) Guo Shanshan (Spain) Alba Carrillo Marín (Switzerland) Valentina Ryser
February 18	Shymkent, Kazakhstan; Hard (indoor); W15; Singles and doubles draws	(Russia) Daria Kruzhkova; 6–3, 2–6, 6–1	(Russia) Anastasia Zakharova	(Russia) Kamilla Rakhimova (Serbia) Tamara Čurović	(Russia) Ekaterina Kazionova (Russia) Gyulnara Nazarova (Russia) Anastasiya Komardina (Russia) Anastasia Tikhonova
February 18	Shymkent, Kazakhstan; Hard (indoor); W15; Singles and doubles draws	(Russia) Ekaterina Kazionova (Russia) Anastasia Zakharova; 7–6^{(7–4)}, 6–1	(Serbia) Tamara Čurović (Estonia) Elena Malõgina	(Russia) Kamilla Rakhimova (Serbia) Tamara Čurović	(Russia) Ekaterina Kazionova (Russia) Gyulnara Nazarova (Russia) Anastasiya Komardina (Russia) Anastasia Tikhonova
February 18	Monastir, Tunisia; Hard; W15; Singles and doubles draws	(Sweden) Mirjam Björklund; 1–6, 7–6^{(7–3)}, 6–3	(Greece) Despina Papamichail	(Spain) Claudia Hoste Ferrer (France) Alice Ramé	(Netherlands) Arianne Hartono (Italy) Lucia Bronzetti (Russia) Daria Lodikova (Russia) Natalia Orlova
February 18	Monastir, Tunisia; Hard; W15; Singles and doubles draws	(Netherlands) Arianne Hartono (Netherlands) Eva Vedder; 6–4, 3–6, [10–7]	(Spain) Andrea Lázaro García (Greece) Despina Papamichail	(Spain) Claudia Hoste Ferrer (France) Alice Ramé	(Netherlands) Arianne Hartono (Italy) Lucia Bronzetti (Russia) Daria Lodikova (Russia) Natalia Orlova
February 18	Antalya, Turkey; Clay; W15; Singles and doubles draws	(Russia) Victoria Kan; 6–2, 6–2	(Romania) Irina Fetecău	(Burundi) Sada Nahimana (Slovenia) Pia Čuk	(Romania) Georgia Crăciun (Romania) Nicoleta Dascălu (Romania) Cristina Dinu (United States) Jessica Ho
February 18	Antalya, Turkey; Clay; W15; Singles and doubles draws	(Italy) Gaia Sanesi (Italy) Camilla Scala; 6–7^{(4–7)}, 6–4, [10–8]	(Romania) Cristina Dinu (Romania) Irina Fetecău	(Burundi) Sada Nahimana (Slovenia) Pia Čuk	(Romania) Georgia Crăciun (Romania) Nicoleta Dascălu (Romania) Cristina Dinu (United States) Jessica Ho
February 25	Mâcon, France; Hard (indoor); W25; Singles and doubles draws	(France) Myrtille Georges; 6–3, 6–3	(Netherlands) Lesley Kerkhove	(Czech Republic) Barbora Krejčíková (Spain) Cristina Bucșa	(Ukraine) Anastasiya Shoshyna (France) Manon Léonard (Netherlands) Bibiane Schoofs (Luxembourg) Eléonora Molinaro
February 25	Mâcon, France; Hard (indoor); W25; Singles and doubles draws	(Netherlands) Lesley Kerkhove (Netherlands) Bibiane Schoofs; 6–2, 6–4	(Italy) Claudia Giovine (Italy) Angelica Moratelli	(Czech Republic) Barbora Krejčíková (Spain) Cristina Bucșa	(Ukraine) Anastasiya Shoshyna (France) Manon Léonard (Netherlands) Bibiane Schoofs (Luxembourg) Eléonora Molinaro
February 25	Osaka, Japan; Hard; W25; Singles and doubles draws	(Serbia) Ivana Jorović; 6–3, 5–7, 6–2	(China) Lu Jiajing	(China) Zhang Kailin (Switzerland) Ylena In-Albon	(Papua New Guinea) Abigail Tere-Apisah (China) Liu Fangzhou (United Kingdom) Katy Dunne (Japan) Ayano Shimizu
February 25	Osaka, Japan; Hard; W25; Singles and doubles draws	(United States) Robin Anderson (United States) Maegan Manasse; 7–6^{(7–2)}, 6–3	(Japan) Risa Ushijima (Japan) Minori Yonehara	(China) Zhang Kailin (Switzerland) Ylena In-Albon	(Papua New Guinea) Abigail Tere-Apisah (China) Liu Fangzhou (United Kingdom) Katy Dunne (Japan) Ayano Shimizu
February 25	Moscow, Russia; Hard (indoor); W25; Singles and doubles draws	(Kazakhstan) Elena Rybakina; 7–5, 6–0	(Ukraine) Ganna Poznikhirenko	(Russia) Olga Doroshina (Russia) Anastasiya Komardina	(Australia) Arina Rodionova (Serbia) Dejana Radanović (Belgium) Maryna Zanevska (Russia) Valeria Savinykh
February 25	Moscow, Russia; Hard (indoor); W25; Singles and doubles draws	(Russia) Sofya Lansere (Kazakhstan) Elena Rybakina; 1–6, 6–3, [10–4]	(Germany) Vivian Heisen (Ukraine) Ganna Poznikhirenko	(Russia) Olga Doroshina (Russia) Anastasiya Komardina	(Australia) Arina Rodionova (Serbia) Dejana Radanović (Belgium) Maryna Zanevska (Russia) Valeria Savinykh
February 25	Nanchang, China; Clay (indoor); W15; Singles and doubles draws	(China) Lu Jiaxi; 7–6^{(7–4)}, 6–3	(China) Guo Hanyu	(China) Liu Chang (South Korea) Kim Da-bin	(Japan) Mana Kawamura (China) Zheng Wushuang (South Korea) Park So-hyun (China) Sun Xuliu
February 25	Nanchang, China; Clay (indoor); W15; Singles and doubles draws	(China) Guo Hanyu (China) Zheng Wushuang; 6–0, 6–1	(China) Ma Yexin (Japan) Mei Yamaguchi	(China) Liu Chang (South Korea) Kim Da-bin	(Japan) Mana Kawamura (China) Zheng Wushuang (South Korea) Park So-hyun (China) Sun Xuliu
February 25	Sharm El Sheikh, Egypt; Hard; W15; Singles and doubles draws	(Czech Republic) Anastasia Dețiuc; 2–6, 7–6^{(7–5)}, 6–1	(Belarus) Shalimar Talbi	(Japan) Ange Oby Kajuru (Finland) Oona Orpana	(Russia) Ulyana Ayzatulina (Bulgaria) Petia Arshinkova (Slovakia) Laura Maluniaková (Czech Republic) Nikola Břečková
February 25	Sharm El Sheikh, Egypt; Hard; W15; Singles and doubles draws	(Croatia) Mariana Dražić (Sweden) Linnéa Malmqvist; 7–5, 6–3	(Russia) Ulyana Ayzatulina (Russia) Alina Silich	(Japan) Ange Oby Kajuru (Finland) Oona Orpana	(Russia) Ulyana Ayzatulina (Bulgaria) Petia Arshinkova (Slovakia) Laura Maluniaková (Czech Republic) Nikola Břečková
February 25	Monastir, Tunisia; Hard; W15; Singles and doubles draws	(Denmark) Clara Tauson; 6–2, 6–1	(Netherlands) Arianne Hartono	(France) Loudmilla Bencheikh (Turkey) İpek Soylu	(Italy) Dalila Spiteri (Italy) Lucia Bronzetti (Croatia) Silvia Njirić (France) Lou Adler
February 25	Monastir, Tunisia; Hard; W15; Singles and doubles draws	(France) Loudmilla Bencheikh (France) Lou Brouleau; 6–3, 6–4	(Portugal) Francisca Jorge (Cambodia) Andrea Ka	(France) Loudmilla Bencheikh (Turkey) İpek Soylu	(Italy) Dalila Spiteri (Italy) Lucia Bronzetti (Croatia) Silvia Njirić (France) Lou Adler
February 25	Antalya, Turkey; Clay; W15; Singles and doubles draws	(Russia) Victoria Kan; 6–3, 6–2	(Italy) Camilla Scala	(Italy) Gaia Sanesi (Slovenia) Pia Čuk	(Romania) Oana Georgeta Simion (Romania) Nicoleta Dascălu (Romania) Cristina Dinu (Japan) Yukina Saigo
February 25	Antalya, Turkey; Clay; W15; Singles and doubles draws	(Japan) Rina Saigo (Japan) Yukina Saigo; 4–6, 6–2, [10–5]	(Chile) Bárbara Gatica (Brazil) Rebeca Pereira	(Italy) Gaia Sanesi (Slovenia) Pia Čuk	(Romania) Oana Georgeta Simion (Romania) Nicoleta Dascălu (Romania) Cristina Dinu (Japan) Yukina Saigo

=== March ===
Week of	Tournament	Winner	Runners-up	Semifinalists	Quarterfinalists
March 4	Mildura, Australia; Grass; W25; Singles and doubles draws	(Australia) Naiktha Bains; 6–4, 6–7^{(5–7)}, 6–2	(Australia) Kaylah McPhee	(Australia) Maddison Inglis (Switzerland) Lulu Sun	(Australia) Destanee Aiava (Australia) Lizette Cabrera (Germany) Katharina Gerlach (Australia) Ellen Perez
March 4	Mildura, Australia; Grass; W25; Singles and doubles draws	(Australia) Alana Parnaby (Australia) Alicia Smith; 3–6, 6–3, [10–8]	(Australia) Olivia Rogowska (Australia) Storm Sanders	(Australia) Maddison Inglis (Switzerland) Lulu Sun	(Australia) Destanee Aiava (Australia) Lizette Cabrera (Germany) Katharina Gerlach (Australia) Ellen Perez
March 4	Keio Challenger; Yokohama, Japan; Hard; W25; Singles and doubles draws	(Belgium) Greet Minnen; 6–4, 6–1	(Romania) Elena-Gabriela Ruse	(United States) Catherine Harrison (South Korea) Han Na-lae	(Chinese Taipei) Lee Hua-chen (Japan) Kyōka Okamura (Switzerland) Ylena In-Albon (Japan) Naho Sato
March 4	Keio Challenger; Yokohama, Japan; Hard; W25; Singles and doubles draws	(South Korea) Choi Ji-hee (South Korea) Han Na-lae; 6–1, 7–5	(India) Rutuja Bhosale (Japan) Akiko Omae	(United States) Catherine Harrison (South Korea) Han Na-lae	(Chinese Taipei) Lee Hua-chen (Japan) Kyōka Okamura (Switzerland) Ylena In-Albon (Japan) Naho Sato
March 4	Irapuato, Mexico; Hard; W25+H; Singles and doubles draws	(Australia) Astra Sharma; 6–7^{(3–7)}, 6–4, 6–3	(Paraguay) Verónica Cepede Royg	(United States) Maria Sanchez (United Kingdom) Katie Swan	(United States) Whitney Osuigwe (United States) Usue Maitane Arconada (India) Karman Thandi (Serbia) Jovana Jakšić
March 4	Irapuato, Mexico; Hard; W25+H; Singles and doubles draws	(New Zealand) Paige Hourigan (Australia) Astra Sharma; 6–1, 4–6, [12–10]	(Paraguay) Verónica Cepede Royg (Czech Republic) Renata Voráčová	(United States) Maria Sanchez (United Kingdom) Katie Swan	(United States) Whitney Osuigwe (United States) Usue Maitane Arconada (India) Karman Thandi (Serbia) Jovana Jakšić
March 4	Nanchang, China; Clay (indoor); W15; Singles and doubles draws	(China) Zhang Ying; 3–6, 6–2, 7–5	(South Korea) Kim Da-bin	(China) Cao Siqi (China) Zheng Wushuang	(Russia) Nika Kukharchuk (China) Sun Xuliu (China) Guo Meiqi (Hong Kong) Eudice Chong
March 4	Nanchang, China; Clay (indoor); W15; Singles and doubles draws	(China) Cao Siqi (China) Guo Meiqi; 6–4, 4–6, [10–8]	(China) Guo Hanyu (China) Tang Qianhui	(China) Cao Siqi (China) Zheng Wushuang	(Russia) Nika Kukharchuk (China) Sun Xuliu (China) Guo Meiqi (Hong Kong) Eudice Chong
March 4	Sharm El Sheikh, Egypt; Hard; W15; Singles and doubles draws	(Ukraine) Daria Snigur; 3–6, 6–3, 6–4	(Finland) Oona Orpana	(Ukraine) Marianna Zakarlyuk (Austria) Melanie Klaffner	(Japan) Ange Oby Kajuru (Austria) Tamira Paszek (Egypt) Sandra Samir (Italy) Federica Bilardo
March 4	Sharm El Sheikh, Egypt; Hard; W15; Singles and doubles draws	(Russia) Angelina Gabueva (Belarus) Shalimar Talbi; 6–4, 6–4	(Croatia) Mariana Dražić (Ukraine) Marianna Zakarlyuk	(Ukraine) Marianna Zakarlyuk (Austria) Melanie Klaffner	(Japan) Ange Oby Kajuru (Austria) Tamira Paszek (Egypt) Sandra Samir (Italy) Federica Bilardo
March 4	Amiens, France; Clay (indoor); W15; Singles and doubles draws	(Spain) Rebeka Masarova; 6–0, 6–3	(Romania) Oana Georgeta Simion	(Germany) Tayisiya Morderger (France) Mylène Halemai	(France) Alice Ramé (Italy) Angelica Moratelli (France) Margaux Orange (France) Kélia Le Bihan
March 4	Amiens, France; Clay (indoor); W15; Singles and doubles draws	(France) Maëlys Bougrat (France) Émeline Dartron; 6–3, 6–2	(Italy) Angelica Moratelli (United Kingdom) Anna Popescu	(Germany) Tayisiya Morderger (France) Mylène Halemai	(France) Alice Ramé (Italy) Angelica Moratelli (France) Margaux Orange (France) Kélia Le Bihan
March 4	Tabarka, Tunisia; Clay; W15; Singles and doubles draws	(Spain) Rosa Vicens Mas; 6–4, 6–4	(Russia) Daria Lodikova	(Portugal) Francisca Jorge (Portugal) Maria Inês Fonte	(Croatia) Silvia Njirić (Spain) Noelia Bouzó Zanotti (Russia) Margarita Lazareva (France) Vinciane Rémy
March 4	Tabarka, Tunisia; Clay; W15; Singles and doubles draws	(Croatia) Silvia Njirić (Bulgaria) Julia Stamatova; 6–3, 6–3	(France) Vinciane Rémy (France) Marie Témin	(Portugal) Francisca Jorge (Portugal) Maria Inês Fonte	(Croatia) Silvia Njirić (Spain) Noelia Bouzó Zanotti (Russia) Margarita Lazareva (France) Vinciane Rémy
March 4	Antalya, Turkey; Clay; W15; Singles and doubles draws	(Ukraine) Maryna Chernyshova; 6–4, 6–4	(Luxembourg) Eléonora Molinaro	(Germany) Lisa Matviyenko (Japan) Yukina Saigo	(Canada) Petra Januskova (Ukraine) Viktoriia Dema (Switzerland) Marie Mettraux (Belarus) Sadafmoh Tolibova
March 4	Antalya, Turkey; Clay; W15; Singles and doubles draws	(Ukraine) Viktoriia Dema (Serbia) Elena Milovanović; 6–4, 6–3	(Italy) Enola Chiesa (Italy) Valentina Losciale	(Germany) Lisa Matviyenko (Japan) Yukina Saigo	(Canada) Petra Januskova (Ukraine) Viktoriia Dema (Switzerland) Marie Mettraux (Belarus) Sadafmoh Tolibova
March 4	Carson, United States; Hard; W15; Singles and doubles draws	(United States) Elizabeth Mandlik; 6–2, 2–6, 6–4	(Canada) Carson Branstine	(United States) Ashlyn Krueger (United States) Rasheeda McAdoo	(United States) Robin Montgomery (United States) Natasha Subhash (United States) Sarah Lee (United States) Hanna Chang
March 4	Carson, United States; Hard; W15; Singles and doubles draws	(United States) Rasheeda McAdoo (United States) Natasha Subhash; 6–2, 6–4	(United States) Nicole Mossmer (United States) Chanelle Van Nguyen	(United States) Ashlyn Krueger (United States) Rasheeda McAdoo	(United States) Robin Montgomery (United States) Natasha Subhash (United States) Sarah Lee (United States) Hanna Chang
March 11	Pingshan Open; Shenzhen, China; Hard; W60; Singles – Doubles	(Denmark) Clara Tauson; 6–4, 6–3	(China) Liu Fangzhou	(China) Lu Jiajing (Japan) Hiroko Kuwata	(Romania) Alexandra Cadanțu (Poland) Magdalena Fręch (China) Xun Fangying (Germany) Sarah-Rebecca Sekulic
March 11	Pingshan Open; Shenzhen, China; Hard; W60; Singles – Doubles	(Chinese Taipei) Liang En-shuo (China) Xun Fangying; 6–4, 6–1	(Japan) Hiroko Kuwata (Uzbekistan) Sabina Sharipova	(China) Lu Jiajing (Japan) Hiroko Kuwata	(Romania) Alexandra Cadanțu (Poland) Magdalena Fręch (China) Xun Fangying (Germany) Sarah-Rebecca Sekulic
March 11	São Paulo, Brazil; Clay; W25; Singles and doubles draws	(United States) Louisa Chirico; 6–0, 6–2	(Montenegro) Danka Kovinić	(Hungary) Anna Bondár (Paraguay) Verónica Cepede Royg	(Spain) Claudia Hoste Ferrer (Italy) Jasmine Paolini (Chile) Daniela Seguel (United States) Elizabeth Halbauer
March 11	São Paulo, Brazil; Clay; W25; Singles and doubles draws	(Brazil) Paula Cristina Gonçalves (Brazil) Luisa Stefani; 6–7^{(4–7)}, 6–0, [10–8]	(Italy) Martina Di Giuseppe (Brazil) Thaísa Pedretti	(Hungary) Anna Bondár (Paraguay) Verónica Cepede Royg	(Spain) Claudia Hoste Ferrer (Italy) Jasmine Paolini (Chile) Daniela Seguel (United States) Elizabeth Halbauer
March 11	Nishitama, Japan; Hard; W25; Singles and doubles draws	(Ukraine) Daria Lopatetska; 7–6^{(7–4)}, 2–6, 6–3	(United Kingdom) Gabriella Taylor	(Italy) Giulia Gatto-Monticone (United States) Quinn Gleason	(United Kingdom) Jodie Burrage (Serbia) Dejana Radanović (Canada) Rebecca Marino (Japan) Ayano Shimizu
March 11	Nishitama, Japan; Hard; W25; Singles and doubles draws	(Japan) Haruna Arakawa (Japan) Minori Yonehara; 6–4, 6–3	(United States) Emina Bektas (United Kingdom) Tara Moore	(Italy) Giulia Gatto-Monticone (United States) Quinn Gleason	(United Kingdom) Jodie Burrage (Serbia) Dejana Radanović (Canada) Rebecca Marino (Japan) Ayano Shimizu
March 11	Kazan, Russia; Hard (indoor); W25+H; Singles and doubles draws	(Kazakhstan) Elena Rybakina; 6–2, 6–3	(Poland) Urszula Radwańska	(Russia) Sofya Lansere (Italy) Lucia Bronzetti	(Germany) Vivian Heisen (Ukraine) Olga Ianchuk (Russia) Ekaterina Makarova (Russia) Kamilla Rakhimova
March 11	Kazan, Russia; Hard (indoor); W25+H; Singles and doubles draws	(Russia) Olga Doroshina (Russia) Polina Monova; 6–4, 6–7^{(4–7)}, [11–9]	(United Kingdom) Freya Christie (Russia) Valeria Savinykh	(Russia) Sofya Lansere (Italy) Lucia Bronzetti	(Germany) Vivian Heisen (Ukraine) Olga Ianchuk (Russia) Ekaterina Makarova (Russia) Kamilla Rakhimova
March 11	Sharm El Sheikh, Egypt; Hard; W15; Singles and doubles draws	(Belarus) Anna Kubareva; 7–5, 6–4	(Italy) Cristiana Ferrando	(Austria) Tamira Paszek (Germany) Laura Schaeder	(Egypt) Mayar Sherif (Egypt) Lamis Alhussein Abdel Aziz (Switzerland) Lara Michel (Moldova) Anastasia Vdovenco
March 11	Sharm El Sheikh, Egypt; Hard; W15; Singles and doubles draws	(Austria) Melanie Klaffner (Germany) Julia Wachaczyk; 6–2 6–2	(Netherlands) Merel Hoedt (Netherlands) Noa Liauw a Fong	(Austria) Tamira Paszek (Germany) Laura Schaeder	(Egypt) Mayar Sherif (Egypt) Lamis Alhussein Abdel Aziz (Switzerland) Lara Michel (Moldova) Anastasia Vdovenco
March 11	Gonesse, France; Clay (indoor); W15; Singles and doubles draws	(Luxembourg) Eléonora Molinaro; 6–2, 2–6, 6–4	(Spain) Rebeka Masarova	(France) Priscilla Heise (France) Émeline Dartron	(France) Margot Yerolymos (France) Alizé Lim (France) Sara Cakarevic (Spain) Marina Bassols Ribera
March 11	Gonesse, France; Clay (indoor); W15; Singles and doubles draws	(France) Mathilde Armitano (France) Elixane Lechemia; 7–6^{(7–1)}, 7–5	(Germany) Tayisiya Morderger (Germany) Yana Morderger	(France) Priscilla Heise (France) Émeline Dartron	(France) Margot Yerolymos (France) Alizé Lim (France) Sara Cakarevic (Spain) Marina Bassols Ribera
March 11	Cancún, Mexico; Hard; W15; Singles and doubles draws	(France) Lou Brouleau; 3–6, 6–4, 5–1, ret.	(Colombia) Camila Osorio	(Japan) Chisa Hosonuma (United Kingdom) Emily Appleton	(Czech Republic) Karolína Beránková (Guatemala) Kirsten-Andrea Weedon (United States) Lea Ma (United States) Dasha Ivanova
March 11	Cancún, Mexico; Hard; W15; Singles and doubles draws	(United Kingdom) Emily Appleton (Mexico) María José Portillo Ramírez; 7–6^{(7–4)}, 6–4	(United States) Dasha Ivanova (Moldova) Alexandra Perper	(Japan) Chisa Hosonuma (United Kingdom) Emily Appleton	(Czech Republic) Karolína Beránková (Guatemala) Kirsten-Andrea Weedon (United States) Lea Ma (United States) Dasha Ivanova
March 11	Tabarka, Tunisia; Clay; W15; Singles and doubles draws	(Norway) Malene Helgø; 6–1, 3–6, 7–5	(Russia) Daria Lodikova	(Italy) Martina Spigarelli (Spain) Rosa Vicens Mas	(Germany) Lisa Ponomar (Russia) Margarita Lazareva (Germany) Julyette Steur (Norway) Melanie Stokke
March 11	Tabarka, Tunisia; Clay; W15; Singles and doubles draws	(France) Vinciane Rémy (France) Marie Témin; 6–4, 6–4	(Spain) Ana Lantigua de la Nuez (Spain) Almudena Sanz-Llaneza Fernández	(Italy) Martina Spigarelli (Spain) Rosa Vicens Mas	(Germany) Lisa Ponomar (Russia) Margarita Lazareva (Germany) Julyette Steur (Norway) Melanie Stokke
March 11	Antalya, Turkey; Clay; W15; Singles and doubles draws	(Ukraine) Viktoriia Dema; 4–6, 6–2, 6–1	(Ukraine) Maryna Chernyshova	(Bulgaria) Gergana Topalova (Czech Republic) Magdaléna Pantůčková	(Sweden) Caijsa Hennemann (Germany) Lisa Matviyenko (Turkey) İpek Öz (Ecuador) Charlotte Römer
March 11	Antalya, Turkey; Clay; W15; Singles and doubles draws	(Sweden) Caijsa Hennemann (Sweden) Melis Yasar; 0–1, retired	(Ukraine) Viktoriia Dema (Hungary) Adrienn Nagy	(Bulgaria) Gergana Topalova (Czech Republic) Magdaléna Pantůčková	(Sweden) Caijsa Hennemann (Germany) Lisa Matviyenko (Turkey) İpek Öz (Ecuador) Charlotte Römer
March 11	Arcadia, United States; Hard; W15; Singles and doubles draws	(United States) Hanna Chang; 7–5, 6–1	(United States) Elizabeth Mandlik	(United States) Pamela Montez (United States) Natasha Subhash	(United States) Allie Will (United States) Savannah Broadus (United States) Sarah Lee (United States) Hurricane Tyra Black
March 11	Arcadia, United States; Hard; W15; Singles and doubles draws	(United States) Brynn Boren (United States) Sarah Lee; 6–2, 6–4	(United States) Pamela Montez (United States) Madison Westby	(United States) Pamela Montez (United States) Natasha Subhash	(United States) Allie Will (United States) Savannah Broadus (United States) Sarah Lee (United States) Hurricane Tyra Black
March 18	ACT Clay Court International; Canberra, Australia; Clay; W25; Singles and doubles draws	(Australia) Destanee Aiava; 6–2, 6–2	(Japan) Risa Ozaki	(Japan) Eri Hozumi (Australia) Olivia Rogowska	(Australia) Maddison Inglis (Australia) Kaylah McPhee (Canada) Leylah Annie Fernandez (Germany) Katharina Gerlach
March 18	ACT Clay Court International; Canberra, Australia; Clay; W25; Singles and doubles draws	(Australia) Naiktha Bains (Slovakia) Tereza Mihalíková; 4–6, 6–2, [10–4]	(Australia) Destanee Aiava (Australia) Ellen Perez	(Japan) Eri Hozumi (Australia) Olivia Rogowska	(Australia) Maddison Inglis (Australia) Kaylah McPhee (Canada) Leylah Annie Fernandez (Germany) Katharina Gerlach
March 18	Curitiba, Brazil; Clay; W25; Singles and doubles draws	(Italy) Jasmine Paolini; 4–6, 6–4, 6–2	(Hungary) Anna Bondár	(United States) Louisa Chirico (Romania) Jaqueline Cristian	(Russia) Varvara Gracheva (Austria) Julia Grabher (France) Chloé Paquet (Georgia (country)) Ekaterine Gorgodze
March 18	Curitiba, Brazil; Clay; W25; Singles and doubles draws	(Brazil) Paula Cristina Gonçalves (Brazil) Luisa Stefani; 6–7^{(3–7)}, 7–6^{(7–0)}, [10–2]	(Georgia (country)) Ekaterine Gorgodze (Chile) Daniela Seguel	(United States) Louisa Chirico (Romania) Jaqueline Cristian	(Russia) Varvara Gracheva (Austria) Julia Grabher (France) Chloé Paquet (Georgia (country)) Ekaterine Gorgodze
March 18	Kōfu International Open; Kōfu, Japan; Hard; W25; Singles and doubles draws	(Chinese Taipei) Lee Hua-chen; 6–7^{(4–7)}, 6–3, 6–4	(Germany) Stephanie Wagner	(Italy) Giulia Gatto-Monticone (China) Lu Jingjing	(Ukraine) Daria Lopatetska (Japan) Momoko Kobori (Japan) Mayo Hibi (Japan) Miharu Imanishi
March 18	Kōfu International Open; Kōfu, Japan; Hard; W25; Singles and doubles draws	(Chinese Taipei) Chang Kai-chen (Chinese Taipei) Hsu Ching-wen; 6–1, 6–3	(United States) Emina Bektas (United Kingdom) Tara Moore	(Italy) Giulia Gatto-Monticone (China) Lu Jingjing	(Ukraine) Daria Lopatetska (Japan) Momoko Kobori (Japan) Mayo Hibi (Japan) Miharu Imanishi
March 18	Xiamen, China; Hard; W15; Singles and doubles draws	(Denmark) Clara Tauson; 2–6, 6–3, 6–2	(China) Guo Meiqi	(China) Liu Chang (Hong Kong) Eudice Chong	(Russia) Nika Kukharchuk (China) Sun Ziyue (Japan) Ayumi Koshiishi (Japan) Himeno Sakatsume
March 18	Xiamen, China; Hard; W15; Singles and doubles draws	(China) Sun Xuliu (China) Zhao Qianqian; 6–4, 6–4	(China) Tang Qianhui (China) Zhang Ying	(China) Liu Chang (Hong Kong) Eudice Chong	(Russia) Nika Kukharchuk (China) Sun Ziyue (Japan) Ayumi Koshiishi (Japan) Himeno Sakatsume
March 18	Sharm El Sheikh, Egypt; Hard; W15; Singles and doubles draws	(Germany) Julia Wachaczyk; 6–3, 6–2	(Netherlands) Indy de Vroome	(Moldova) Anastasia Vdovenco (Switzerland) Simona Waltert	(Sweden) Jacqueline Cabaj Awad (Slovakia) Barbora Matúšová (Belarus) Anna Kubareva (Germany) Lena Lutzeier
March 18	Sharm El Sheikh, Egypt; Hard; W15; Singles and doubles draws	(Russia) Angelina Gabueva (Germany) Julia Wachaczyk; 7–5, 7–6^{(7–5)}	(Sweden) Linnéa Malmqvist (Russia) Alina Silich	(Moldova) Anastasia Vdovenco (Switzerland) Simona Waltert	(Sweden) Jacqueline Cabaj Awad (Slovakia) Barbora Matúšová (Belarus) Anna Kubareva (Germany) Lena Lutzeier
March 18	Le Havre, France; Clay (indoor); W15; Singles and doubles draws	(United Kingdom) Amanda Carreras; 4–6, 6–3, 6–1	(France) Émeline Dartron	(Luxembourg) Eléonora Molinaro (France) Mallaurie Noël	(France) Manon Arcangioli (Germany) Yana Morderger (Spain) Alba Carrillo Marín (Switzerland) Lisa Sabino
March 18	Le Havre, France; Clay (indoor); W15; Singles and doubles draws	(Germany) Tayisiya Morderger (Germany) Yana Morderger; 6–4, 6–3	(Luxembourg) Eléonora Molinaro (Switzerland) Svenja Ochsner	(Luxembourg) Eléonora Molinaro (France) Mallaurie Noël	(France) Manon Arcangioli (Germany) Yana Morderger (Spain) Alba Carrillo Marín (Switzerland) Lisa Sabino
March 18	Cancún, Mexico; Hard; W15; Singles and doubles draws	(New Zealand) Paige Hourigan; 6–4, 6–3	(Colombia) Camila Osorio	(France) Lou Brouleau (Belgium) Magali Kempen	(Canada) Alexandra Mikhailuk (United States) Pamela Montez (Paraguay) Montserrat González (United States) Dasha Ivanova
March 18	Cancún, Mexico; Hard; W15; Singles and doubles draws	(France) Lou Brouleau (Switzerland) Tess Sugnaux; 6–4, 6–3	(New Zealand) Paige Hourigan (United States) Rasheeda McAdoo	(France) Lou Brouleau (Belgium) Magali Kempen	(Canada) Alexandra Mikhailuk (United States) Pamela Montez (Paraguay) Montserrat González (United States) Dasha Ivanova
March 18	Tabarka, Tunisia; Clay; W15; Singles and doubles draws	(Sweden) Mirjam Björklund; 6–3, 6–2	(Slovakia) Chantal Škamlová	(Norway) Malene Helgø (Norway) Melanie Stokke	(Spain) Ana Lantigua de la Nuez (France) Marie Témin (Romania) Oana Georgeta Simion (Germany) Julyette Steur
March 18	Tabarka, Tunisia; Clay; W15; Singles and doubles draws	(Romania) Oana Gavrilă (Italy) Martina Spigarelli; 7–5, 3–6, [10–8]	(Romania) Oana Georgeta Simion (Slovakia) Chantal Škamlová	(Norway) Malene Helgø (Norway) Melanie Stokke	(Spain) Ana Lantigua de la Nuez (France) Marie Témin (Romania) Oana Georgeta Simion (Germany) Julyette Steur
March 18	Antalya, Turkey; Clay; W15; Singles and doubles draws	(Australia) Seone Mendez; 6–4, 6–0	(North Macedonia) Lina Gjorcheska	(Ecuador) Charlotte Römer (Romania) Cristina Dinu	(Romania) Cristina Ene (Bulgaria) Petia Arshinkova (Turkey) İpek Öz (Switzerland) Xenia Knoll
March 18	Antalya, Turkey; Clay; W15; Singles and doubles draws	(Russia) Daria Mishina (Kyrgyzstan) Ksenia Palkina; 6–3, 3–6, [12–10]	(Romania) Cristina Dinu (North Macedonia) Lina Gjorcheska	(Ecuador) Charlotte Römer (Romania) Cristina Dinu	(Romania) Cristina Ene (Bulgaria) Petia Arshinkova (Turkey) İpek Öz (Switzerland) Xenia Knoll
March 25	Open de Seine-et-Marne; Croissy-Beaubourg, France; Hard (indoor); W60; Singles – Doubles	(Russia) Vitalia Diatchenko; 6–2, 6–3	(United States) Robin Anderson	(Czech Republic) Tereza Smitková (United Kingdom) Harriet Dart	(Belgium) Maryna Zanevska (Bulgaria) Viktoriya Tomova (France) Myrtille Georges (Romania) Laura-Ioana Paar
March 25	Open de Seine-et-Marne; Croissy-Beaubourg, France; Hard (indoor); W60; Singles – Doubles	(United Kingdom) Harriet Dart (Netherlands) Lesley Kerkhove; 6–3, 6–2	(United Kingdom) Sarah Beth Grey (United Kingdom) Eden Silva	(Czech Republic) Tereza Smitková (United Kingdom) Harriet Dart	(Belgium) Maryna Zanevska (Bulgaria) Viktoriya Tomova (France) Myrtille Georges (Romania) Laura-Ioana Paar
March 25	ACT Clay Court International; Canberra, Australia; Clay; W25; Singles and doubles draws	(Australia) Olivia Rogowska; 7–6^{(8–6)}, 6–3	(Australia) Priscilla Hon	(Japan) Miharu Imanishi (Australia) Abbie Myers	(Turkey) Çağla Büyükakçay (Japan) Eri Hozumi (Canada) Leylah Annie Fernandez (Romania) Irina Bara
March 25	ACT Clay Court International; Canberra, Australia; Clay; W25; Singles and doubles draws	(Australia) Alison Bai (Australia) Jaimee Fourlis; 6–2, 6–2	(Australia) Naiktha Bains (Slovakia) Tereza Mihalíková	(Japan) Miharu Imanishi (Australia) Abbie Myers	(Turkey) Çağla Büyükakçay (Japan) Eri Hozumi (Canada) Leylah Annie Fernandez (Romania) Irina Bara
March 25	Campinas, Brazil; Clay; W25; Singles and doubles draws	(Montenegro) Danka Kovinić; 6–2, 3–6, 6–3	(Austria) Julia Grabher	(Italy) Jessica Pieri (Italy) Martina Di Giuseppe	(Georgia (country)) Ekaterine Gorgodze (Bulgaria) Elitsa Kostova (Cyprus) Raluca Șerban (Italy) Jasmine Paolini
March 25	Campinas, Brazil; Clay; W25; Singles and doubles draws	(Montenegro) Danka Kovinić (Brazil) Laura Pigossi; 6–3, 6–2	(Brazil) Carolina Alves (Brazil) Gabriela Cé	(Italy) Jessica Pieri (Italy) Martina Di Giuseppe	(Georgia (country)) Ekaterine Gorgodze (Bulgaria) Elitsa Kostova (Cyprus) Raluca Șerban (Italy) Jasmine Paolini
March 25	Pula, Italy; Clay; W25; Singles and doubles draws	(Switzerland) Jil Teichmann; 7–6^{(7–3)}, 6–0	(Slovenia) Kaja Juvan	(Russia) Victoria Kan (Georgia (country)) Mariam Bolkvadze	(Italy) Lucrezia Stefanini (Romania) Ioana Loredana Roșca (Russia) Valentina Ivakhnenko (Italy) Stefania Rubini
March 25	Pula, Italy; Clay; W25; Singles and doubles draws	(Russia) Alena Fomina (Russia) Valentina Ivakhnenko; 7–5, 3–6, [10–8]	(Romania) Cristina Dinu (Hungary) Réka Luca Jani	(Russia) Victoria Kan (Georgia (country)) Mariam Bolkvadze	(Italy) Lucrezia Stefanini (Romania) Ioana Loredana Roșca (Russia) Valentina Ivakhnenko (Italy) Stefania Rubini
March 25	Kōfu, Japan; Hard; W25; Singles and doubles draws	(Italy) Giulia Gatto-Monticone; 6–2, 6–1	(Belgium) Lara Salden	(Japan) Momoko Kobori (Japan) Mayo Hibi	(South Korea) Han Na-lae (Egypt) Sandra Samir (Australia) Arina Rodionova (China) Zhang Yuxuan
March 25	Kōfu, Japan; Hard; W25; Singles and doubles draws	(Chinese Taipei) Chang Kai-chen (Chinese Taipei) Hsu Ching-wen; 6–3, 6–4	(China) Xun Fangying (China) You Xiaodi	(Japan) Momoko Kobori (Japan) Mayo Hibi	(South Korea) Han Na-lae (Egypt) Sandra Samir (Australia) Arina Rodionova (China) Zhang Yuxuan
March 25	Sharm El Sheikh, Egypt; Hard; W15; Singles and doubles draws	(Turkey) İpek Soylu; 6–3, 6–3	(United States) Nadja Gilchrist	(Sweden) Jacqueline Cabaj Awad (Kazakhstan) Gozal Ainitdinova	(Russia) Ekaterina Kazionova (Finland) Anastasia Kulikova (France) Emma Léné (Egypt) Mayar Sherif
March 25	Sharm El Sheikh, Egypt; Hard; W15; Singles and doubles draws	(Sweden) Jacqueline Cabaj Awad (Turkey) İpek Soylu; 6–2, 6–4	(Kazakhstan) Gozal Ainitdinova (Russia) Ekaterina Kazionova	(Sweden) Jacqueline Cabaj Awad (Kazakhstan) Gozal Ainitdinova	(Russia) Ekaterina Kazionova (Finland) Anastasia Kulikova (France) Emma Léné (Egypt) Mayar Sherif
March 25	Tel Aviv, Israel; Hard; W15; Singles and doubles draws	(Italy) Corinna Dentoni; 6–4, 6–3	(United Kingdom) Emma Raducanu	(Israel) Lina Glushko (Israel) Vlada Ekshibarova	(Japan) Sakura Hosogi (Slovakia) Viktória Morvayová (Israel) Shelly Bereznyak (Ukraine) Marianna Zakarlyuk
March 25	Tel Aviv, Israel; Hard; W15; Singles and doubles draws	(Israel) Vlada Ekshibarova (Russia) Daria Kruzhkova; 6–3, 6–2	(Netherlands) Merel Hoedt (Czech Republic) Anna Sisková	(Israel) Lina Glushko (Israel) Vlada Ekshibarova	(Japan) Sakura Hosogi (Slovakia) Viktória Morvayová (Israel) Shelly Bereznyak (Ukraine) Marianna Zakarlyuk
March 25	Cancún, Mexico; Hard; W15; Singles and doubles draws	(Paraguay) Montserrat González; 6–7^{(2–7)}, 6–1, 6–3	(United Kingdom) Emily Appleton	(New Zealand) Paige Hourigan (Canada) Carson Branstine	(Montenegro) Vladica Babić (France) Lou Brouleau (Czech Republic) Karolína Beránková (Mexico) María José Portillo Ramírez
March 25	Cancún, Mexico; Hard; W15; Singles and doubles draws	(Montenegro) Vladica Babić (New Zealand) Paige Hourigan; 6–4, 6–3	(Czech Republic) Karolína Beránková (Paraguay) Lara Escauriza	(New Zealand) Paige Hourigan (Canada) Carson Branstine	(Montenegro) Vladica Babić (France) Lou Brouleau (Czech Republic) Karolína Beránková (Mexico) María José Portillo Ramírez
March 25	Tabarka, Tunisia; Clay; W15; Singles and doubles draws	(Russia) Daria Lodikova; 6–4, 6–2	(Romania) Oana Gavrilă	(France) Loudmilla Bencheikh (France) Alice Ramé	(Norway) Malene Helgø (Germany) Julyette Steur (France) Yasmine Mansouri (Japan) Satsuki Koike
March 25	Tabarka, Tunisia; Clay; W15; Singles and doubles draws	(Switzerland) Nicole Gadient (United States) Chiara Scholl; 7–5, 7–5	(Japan) Nagomi Higashitani (Japan) Satsuki Koike	(France) Loudmilla Bencheikh (France) Alice Ramé	(Norway) Malene Helgø (Germany) Julyette Steur (France) Yasmine Mansouri (Japan) Satsuki Koike
March 25	Antalya, Turkey; Clay; W15; Singles and doubles draws	(Australia) Seone Mendez; 7–5, 7–6^{(7–3)}	(Japan) Yuki Naito	(Czech Republic) Johana Marková (Russia) Daria Mishina	(Romania) Andreea Prisăcariu (Slovenia) Nika Radišič (Sweden) Fanny Östlund (Ecuador) Charlotte Römer
March 25	Antalya, Turkey; Clay; W15; Singles and doubles draws	(Czech Republic) Johana Marková (Slovenia) Nika Radišič; 6–0, 6–0	(Estonia) Elena Malõgina (South Korea) Park So-hyun	(Czech Republic) Johana Marková (Russia) Daria Mishina	(Romania) Andreea Prisăcariu (Slovenia) Nika Radišič (Sweden) Fanny Östlund (Ecuador) Charlotte Römer
