= 2018 Engie Open de Seine-et-Marne – Doubles =

Doubles
- 2018 Engie Open de Seine-et-Marne

Final
- Champions: (Russia) Anna Kalinskaya (Slovakia) Viktória Kužmová
- Runners-up: (Czech Republic) Petra Krejsová (Czech Republic) Jesika Malečková
- Score: 7–6^{(7–5)}, 6–1

Events
Singles	Doubles
← 2017 ·	Open de Seine-et-Marne	· 2019 →

Vera Lapko and Polina Monova were the defending champions, but Lapko chose not to participate. Monova partnered Olga Doroshina, but lost in the first round to Anna Kalinskaya and Viktória Kužmová.

Kalinskaya and Kužmová won the title after defeating Petra Krejsová and Jesika Malečková 7–6^{(7–5)}, 6–1 in the final.

== Seeds ==
1. (Russia) Natela Dzalamidze / (Switzerland) Xenia Knoll (first round)
2. (Belarus) Lidziya Marozava / (Netherlands) Arantxa Rus (semifinals)
3. (Latvia) Diāna Marcinkēviča / (Netherlands) Bibiane Schoofs (first round)
4. (Russia) Olga Doroshina / (Russia) Polina Monova (first round)

== Draw ==
=== Key ===
- Q = Qualifier
- WC = Wild card
- LL = Lucky loser
- Alt = Alternate
- SE = Special exempt
- PR = Protected ranking
- ITF = ITF entry
- JE = Junior exempt
- w/o = Walkover
- r = Retired
- d = Defaulted
- SR = Special ranking

=== Draw ===
First round
1	(Russia) N Dzalamidze (Switzerland) X Knoll	4	3
(France) M Arcangioli (Belgium) A-S Mestach	6	6
(United Kingdom) T Moore (United States) C Scholl	6^{4}	3
(Uzbekistan) A Amanmuradova (Russia) V Zvonareva	7^{7}	6
4	(Russia) O Doroshina (Russia) P Monova	6^{5}	3
(Russia) A Kalinskaya (Slovakia) V Kužmová	7^{7}	6
(Italy) C Ferrando (Italy) C Rosatello	w/o
WC	(France) A Albié (France) H Tan
(Germany) N Geuer (Germany) A Zaja	4	6	[5]
(Czech Republic) P Krejsová (Czech Republic) J Malečková	6	4	[10]
(Spain) C Bucșa (Ukraine) G Poznikhirenko	6	6
3	(Latvia) D Marcinkēviča (Netherlands) B Schoofs	0	4
(Romania) L-I Andrei (Romania) RG Șerban	6	6
WC	(France) L Adler (France) C Sireix	0	1
WC	(France) É Dartron (France) M Léonard	2	5
2	(Belarus) L Marozava (Netherlands) A Rus	6	7

Quarterfinals
(France) M Arcangioli (Belgium) A-S Mestach	1	1
(Uzbekistan) A Amanmuradova (Russia) V Zvonareva	6	6
(Russia) A Kalinskaya (Slovakia) V Kužmová	6	6
(Italy) C Ferrando (Italy) C Rosatello	2	0
(Czech Republic) P Krejsová (Czech Republic) J Malečková	6	2	[10]
(Spain) C Bucșa (Ukraine) G Poznikhirenko	3	6	[2]
(Romania) L-I Andrei (Romania) RG Șerban	4	4
2	(Belarus) L Marozava (Netherlands) A Rus	6	6

Semifinals
(Uzbekistan) A Amanmuradova (Russia) V Zvonareva	6	5	[8]
(Russia) A Kalinskaya (Slovakia) V Kužmová	3	7	[10]
(Czech Republic) P Krejsová (Czech Republic) J Malečková	6	6^{5}	[10]
2	(Belarus) L Marozava (Netherlands) A Rus	4	7^{7}	[7]

Final
(Russia) A Kalinskaya (Slovakia) V Kužmová	7^{7}	6
(Czech Republic) P Krejsová (Czech Republic) J Malečková	6^{5}	1
