= 2019 Shimadzu All Japan Indoor Tennis Championships =

- Date: 18–24 February 2019
- Edition: 1st (women)
- Category: ITF Women's World Tennis Tour
- Prize money: $60,000
- Surface: Hard / Indoor
- Location: Kyoto, Japan

Champions

Singles
- (Switzerland) Ylena In-Albon

Doubles
- (Japan) Eri Hozumi / (Japan) Moyuka Uchijima
- Shimadzu All Japan Indoor Tennis Championships

The 2019 Shimadzu All Japan Indoor Tennis Championships was a professional tennis tournament played on indoor hard courts. It was the first edition of the women's tournament which was part of the 2019 ITF Women's World Tennis Tour. It took place in Kyoto, Japan between 18 and 24 February 2019.

== Singles main-draw entrants ==
=== Seeds ===
| Country | Player | Rank^{1} | Seed |
|---|---|---|---|
| JPN | Nao Hibino | 122 | 1 |
| JPN | Kurumi Nara | 156 | 2 |
| CHN | Liu Fangzhou | 178 | 3 |
| JPN | Ayano Shimizu | 204 | 4 |
| CHN | Xun Fangying | 215 | 5 |
| TPE | Liang En-shuo | 233 | 6 |
| SUI | Ylena In-Albon | 244 | 7 |
| CHN | Zhang Kailin | 245 | 8 |

- ^{1} Rankings are as of 11 February 2019.

=== Other entrants ===
The following players received wildcards into the singles main draw:

- (Japan) Mai Hontama
- (Japan) Miharu Imanishi
- (Japan) Haruka Kaji
- (Japan) Naho Sato

The following players received entry from the qualifying draw:

- (Japan) Eri Hozumi
- (Japan) Megumi Nishimoto
- (Japan) Kyōka Okamura
- (Japan) Akiko Omae
- (Japan) Moyuka Uchijima
- (Hong Kong) Zhang Ling

== Champions ==
=== Singles ===
- (Switzerland) Ylena In-Albon def. (China) Zhang Kailin, 6–2, 6–3

=== Doubles ===
- (Japan) Eri Hozumi / (Japan) Moyuka Uchijima def. (Chinese Taipei) Chen Pei-hsuan / (Chinese Taipei) Wu Fang-hsien, 6–4, 6–3
