= 2017 Engie Open de Seine-et-Marne =

- Date: 27 March–2 April
- Edition: 5th
- Category: ITF Women's Circuit
- Prize money: $60,000
- Surface: Hard / Indoor
- Location: Croissy-Beaubourg, France

Champions

Singles
- (Russia) Ekaterina Alexandrova

Doubles
- (Belarus) Vera Lapko / (Russia) Polina Monova
← 2016 ·	Open de Seine-et-Marne	· 2018 →

The 2017 Engie Open de Seine-et-Marne was a professional tennis tournament played on indoor hard courts. It was the fifth edition of the tournament and part of the 2017 ITF Women's Circuit, offering a total of $60,000 in prize money. It took place in Croissy-Beaubourg, France, from 27 March–2 April 2017.

== Singles main draw entrants ==
=== Seeds ===
Country	Player	Rank^{1}	Seed
FRA	Océane Dodin	59	1
RUS	Ekaterina Alexandrova	93	2
TPE	Hsieh Su-wei	98	3
UKR	Kateryna Kozlova	113	4
BEL	Maryna Zanevska	116	5
SUI	Belinda Bencic	135	6
UZB	Sabina Sharipova	140	7
BUL	Isabella Shinikova	145	8

- ^{1} Rankings as of 20 March 2017

=== Other entrants ===
The following players received wildcards into the singles main draw:

- (France) Manon Arcangioli
- (Switzerland) Belinda Bencic
- (France) Margot Yerolymos

The following players received entry from the qualifying draw:

- (Belarus) Vera Lapko
- (Bulgaria) Aleksandrina Naydenova
- (Czech Republic) Markéta Vondroušová
- (Germany) Anna Zaja

The following players received entry into the singles main draw by lucky losers:

- (Latvia) Diāna Marcinkēviča
- (Germany) Tayisiya Morderger
- (Germany) Yana Morderger

== Champions ==
=== Singles ===
- (Russia) Ekaterina Alexandrova def. (Netherlands) Richèl Hogenkamp, 6–2, 6–7^{(3–7)}, 6–3

=== Doubles ===
- (Belarus) Vera Lapko / (Russia) Polina Monova def. (France) Manon Arcangioli / (Poland) Magdalena Fręch, 6–3, 6–4
