= 2016 Engie Open de Seine-et-Marne – Singles =

Singles
- 2016 Engie Open de Seine-et-Marne

Final
- Champion: (Serbia) Ivana Jorović
- Runner-up: (France) Pauline Parmentier
- Score: 6–1, 4–6, 6–4

Events
Singles	Doubles
← 2015 ·	Engie Open de Seine-et-Marne	· 2017 →

Margarita Gasparyan was the defending champion, but chose not to participate.

Ivana Jorović won the title, defeating Pauline Parmentier in the final, 6–1, 4–6, 6–4.

== Seeds ==
1. (Russia) Elizaveta Kulichkova (second round)
2. (France) Pauline Parmentier (final)
3. (Romania) Andreea Mitu (quarterfinals)
4. (Switzerland) Stefanie Vögele (quarterfinals)
5. (Switzerland) Romina Oprandi (first round)
6. (Czech Republic) Tereza Smitková (first round)
7. (Romania) Sorana Cîrstea (semifinals)
8. (France) Océane Dodin (semifinals)

== Main draw ==
=== Key ===
- Q = Qualifier
- WC = Wild card
- LL = Lucky loser
- Alt = Alternate
- SE = Special exempt
- PR = Protected ranking
- ITF = ITF entry
- JE = Junior exempt
- w/o = Walkover
- r = Retired
- d = Defaulted
- SR = Special ranking

=== Finals ===
Semifinals
(Serbia) Ivana Jorović	4	6	6
8	(France) Océane Dodin	6	3	3
7	(Romania) Sorana Cîrstea	2	1
2	(France) Pauline Parmentier	6	6

Final
(Serbia) Ivana Jorović	6	4	6
2	(France) Pauline Parmentier	1	6	4

=== Top half ===
First round
1	(Russia) E Kulichkova	6	6
WC	(France) F Ferro	1	2
(France) V Razzano	3	0^{r}
(Serbia) I Jorović	6	3
(Russia) A Panova	6	6
(Russia) M Melnikova	1	2
(Georgia (country)) S Shapatava	6	3	7^{7}
6	(Czech Republic) T Smitková	0	6	6^{3}
4	(Switzerland) S Vögele	6	6
(Luxembourg) M Minella	2	2
(Czech Republic) J Malečková	6	6
(France) A Hesse	2	2
(France) M Johansson	6	6^{3}	1
Q	(Ukraine) O Fridman	2	7^{7}	6
(Slovakia) D Hantuchová	2	5
8	(France) O Dodin	6	7

Second round
1	(Russia) E Kulichkova	3	0
(Serbia) I Jorović	6	6
(Russia) A Panova	6	4
(Georgia (country)) S Shapatava	3	0^{r}
4	(Switzerland) S Vögele	6	6
(Czech Republic) J Malečková	3	1
Q	(Ukraine) O Fridman	1^{r}
8	(France) O Dodin	4

Quarterfinals
(Serbia) I Jorović	6	6
(Russia) A Panova	3	4
4	(Switzerland) S Vögele	6^{4}	3
8	(France) O Dodin	7^{7}	6

Semifinals
(Serbia) I Jorović	4	6	6
8	(France) O Dodin	6	3	3

=== Bottom half ===
First round
7	(Romania) S Cîrstea	7^{7}	6
(Bulgaria) E Kostova	6^{2}	2
(France) S Foretz	6	3	5
WC	(France) J Boualem	0	6	7
Q	(Greece) V Grammatikopoulou	3	6	2
(France) M Georges	6	4	6
Q	(Bulgaria) J Terziyska	3	5
3/WC	(Romania) A Mitu	6	7
5	(Switzerland) R Oprandi	6	2	2
(Tunisia) O Jabeur	2	6	6
(Russia) P Leykina	7^{9}	2	6
WC	(France) C Feuerstein	6^{7}	6	2
(Romania) C Dinu	7	2	6
Q	(United Kingdom) T Moore	5	6	1
JE	(Russia) A Blinkova	0	5
2	(France) P Parmentier	6	7

Second round
7	(Romania) S Cîrstea	6	6
WC	(France) J Boualem	2	3
(France) M Georges
3/WC	(Romania) A Mitu	w/o
(Tunisia) O Jabeur	6	6
(Russia) P Leykina	2	4
(Romania) C Dinu	4	2
2	(France) P Parmentier	6	6

Quarterfinals
7	(Romania) S Cîrstea	7^{7}	6
3/WC	(Romania) A Mitu	6^{4}	1
(Tunisia) O Jabeur	3	3
2	(France) P Parmentier	6	6

Semifinals
7	(Romania) S Cîrstea	2	1
2	(France) P Parmentier	6	6
