= 2018 Engie Open de Seine-et-Marne – Singles =

Singles
- 2018 Engie Open de Seine-et-Marne

Final
- Champion: (Russia) Anna Blinkova
- Runner-up: (Czech Republic) Karolína Muchová
- Score: Walkover

Events
Singles	Doubles
← 2017 ·	Open de Seine-et-Marne	· 2019 →

Ekaterina Alexandrova was the defending champion, but lost in the first round to Jessika Ponchet.

Anna Blinkova won the title after Karolína Muchová withdrew from the final.

== Seeds ==
1. (Russia) Ekaterina Alexandrova (first round)
2. (France) Océane Dodin (withdrew)
3. (Czech Republic) Denisa Allertová (first round)
4. (Slovakia) Viktória Kužmová (first round)
5. (France) Pauline Parmentier (second round)
6. (Netherlands) Arantxa Rus (first round)
7. (Russia) Anna Blinkova (champion)
8. (Poland) Magdalena Fręch (semifinals)

== Draw ==
=== Key ===
- Q = Qualifier
- WC = Wild card
- LL = Lucky loser
- Alt = Alternate
- SE = Special exempt
- PR = Protected ranking
- ITF = ITF entry
- JE = Junior exempt
- w/o = Walkover
- r = Retired
- d = Defaulted
- SR = Special ranking

=== Finals ===
Semifinals
Q	(Czech Republic) Karolína Muchová	6	4	6
(Russia) Anna Kalinskaya	1	6	3
8	(Poland) Magdalena Fręch	4	6	4
7	(Russia) Anna Blinkova	6	3	6

Final
Q	(Czech Republic) Karolína Muchová
7	(Russia) Anna Blinkova	w/o

=== Top half ===
First round
1	(Russia) E Alexandrova	3	6	5
WC	(France) J Ponchet	6	2	7
Q	(Czech Republic) J Malečková	6	6
JE	(Russia) E Rybakina	2	4
(Germany) A Lottner	3	5
Q	(Czech Republic) K Muchová	6	7
(Netherlands) B Schoofs	5	4
5	(France) P Parmentier	7	6
3	(Czech Republic) D Allertová	1	2
(Russia) V Zvonareva	6	6
Q	(France) H Tan	6	6
(Russia) P Monova	1	4
(Bulgaria) V Tomova	4	6^{7}
(Russia) A Kalinskaya	6	7^{9}
Q	(Russia) O Doroshina	6	6
6	(Netherlands) A Rus	3	4

Second round
WC	(France) J Ponchet	7	7^{7}
Q	(Czech Republic) J Malečková	5	6^{5}
Q	(Czech Republic) K Muchová	6	6
5	(France) P Parmentier	3	4
(Russia) V Zvonareva	3
Q	(France) H Tan	0^{r}
(Russia) A Kalinskaya	6	6
Q	(Russia) O Doroshina	3	2

Quarterfinals
WC	(France) J Ponchet	6^{5}	2
Q	(Czech Republic) K Muchová	7^{7}	6
(Russia) V Zvonareva	1	3
(Russia) A Kalinskaya	6	6

Semifinals
Q	(Czech Republic) K Muchová	6	4	6
(Russia) A Kalinskaya	1	6	3

=== Bottom half ===
First round
8	(Poland) M Fręch	6	6
WC	(France) C Paquet	4	4
(Germany) A Zaja	6	3	4
(Spain) P Badosa Gibert	4	6	6
(Russia) V Diatchenko	6	6
WC	(France) A Albié	3	2
LL	(Poland) K Piter	2	6	6
4	(Slovakia) V Kužmová	6	0	4
7	(Russia) A Blinkova	6	6
WC	(France) M Léonard	1	1
(Czech Republic) T Smitková	3	2
LL	(Poland) U Radwańska	6	6
(France) A Hesse	5	6^{2}
(Germany) T Korpatsch	7	7^{7}
(United States) C Scholl	2	0
LL	(Italy) C Ferrando	6	6

Second round
8	(Poland) M Fręch	6	7
(Spain) P Badosa Gibert	1	5
(Russia) V Diatchenko	6	6
LL	(Poland) K Piter	3	4
7	(Russia) A Blinkova	7	6^{5}	7
LL	(Poland) U Radwańska	5	7^{7}	5
(Germany) T Korpatsch	3	6	7^{7}
LL	(Italy) C Ferrando	6	0	6^{5}

Quarterfinals
8	(Poland) M Fręch	7	7^{7}
(Russia) V Diatchenko	5	6^{2}
7	(Russia) A Blinkova	6	4	6
(Germany) T Korpatsch	2	6	2

Semifinals
8	(Poland) M Fręch	4	6	4
7	(Russia) A Blinkova	6	3	6
