= 2017 Engie Open de Seine-et-Marne – Singles =

Singles
- 2017 Engie Open de Seine-et-Marne

Final
- Champion: (Russia) Ekaterina Alexandrova
- Runner-up: (Netherlands) Richèl Hogenkamp
- Score: 6–2, 6–7^{(3–7)}, 6–3

Events
Singles	Doubles
← 2016 ·	Open de Seine-et-Marne	· 2018 →

Ivana Jorović was the defending champion but lost in the first round to Sabina Sharipova.

Ekaterina Alexandrova won the title, defeating Richèl Hogenkamp in the final, 6–2, 6–7^{(3–7)}, 6–3.

== Seeds ==
1. (France) Océane Dodin (first round)
2. (Russia) Ekaterina Alexandrova (champion)
3. (Chinese Taipei) Hsieh Su-wei (second round)
4. (Ukraine) Kateryna Kozlova (quarterfinals)
5. (Belgium) Maryna Zanevska (quarterfinals)
6. (Switzerland) Belinda Bencic (quarterfinals, retired)
7. (Uzbekistan) Sabina Sharipova (second round)
8. (Bulgaria) Isabella Shinikova (first round)

== Draw ==
=== Key ===
- Q = Qualifier
- WC = Wild card
- LL = Lucky loser
- Alt = Alternate
- SE = Special exempt
- PR = Protected ranking
- ITF = ITF entry
- JE = Junior exempt
- w/o = Walkover
- r = Retired
- d = Defaulted
- SR = Special ranking

=== Finals ===
Semifinals
Q	(Germany) Anna Zaja	6	3	2
(Netherlands) Richèl Hogenkamp	3	6	6
Q	(Czech Republic) Markéta Vondroušová	5	3
2	(Russia) Ekaterina Alexandrova	7	6

Final
(Netherlands) Richèl Hogenkamp	2	7^{7}	3
2	(Russia) Ekaterina Alexandrova	6	6^{3}	6

=== Top half ===
First round
1	(France) O Dodin	4	4
(Slovakia) M Rybáriková	6	6
Q	(Germany) A Zaja	6	2
(Austria) T Paszek	0	0^{r}
(Belgium) A-S Mestach	2	7	4
(Russia) A Kalinskaya	6	5	1^{r}
(United Kingdom) L Robson	6	3	6
8	(Bulgaria) I Shinikova	1	6	3
3	(Chinese Taipei) S-w Hsieh	6	6
WC	(France) M Arcangioli	3	0
(Netherlands) R Hogenkamp	7	6
LL	(Germany) Y Morderger	5	2
(Czech Republic) T Smitková	6	6
(Germany) T Korpatsch	3	1
(Germany) A Lottner	3	2
6/WC	(Switzerland) B Bencic	6	6

Second round
(Slovakia) M Rybáriková	6^{4}	4
Q	(Germany) A Zaja	7^{7}	6
(Belgium) A-S Mestach	6	7^{7}
(United Kingdom) L Robson	4	6^{2}
3	(Chinese Taipei) S-w Hsieh	2	4
(Netherlands) R Hogenkamp	6	6
(Czech Republic) T Smitková	7^{7}	4	5
6/WC	(Switzerland) B Bencic	6^{4}	6	7

Quarterfinals
Q	(Germany) A Zaja	6	6
(Belgium) A-S Mestach	2	4
(Netherlands) R Hogenkamp	5
6/WC	(Switzerland) B Bencic	4^{r}

Semifinals
Q	(Germany) A Zaja	6	3	2
(Netherlands) R Hogenkamp	3	6	6

=== Bottom half ===
First round
7	(Uzbekistan) S Sharipova	2	7	7^{7}
(Serbia) I Jorović	6	5	6^{4}
LL	(Latvia) D Marcinkēviča	2	0
Q	(Czech Republic) M Vondroušová	6	6
(Russia) P Monova	2	6	1
(Switzerland) A Sadiković	6	2	6
Q	(Belarus) V Lapko	4	2
4	(Ukraine) K Kozlova	6	6
5	(Belgium) M Zanevska	6	6
(Czech Republic) M Bouzková	2	3
(Russia) A Komardina	7	6
WC	(France) M Yerolymos	5	3
LL	(Germany) T Morderger	2	7	2
(France) A Hesse	6	5	6
Q	(Bulgaria) A Naydenova	4	3
2	(Russia) E Alexandrova	6	6

Second round
7	(Uzbekistan) S Sharipova	1	0
Q	(Czech Republic) M Vondroušová	6	6
(Switzerland) A Sadiković	6	6^{6}	3
4	(Ukraine) K Kozlova	4	7^{8}	6
5	(Belgium) M Zanevska	6	6
(Russia) A Komardina	2	2
(France) A Hesse	5	2
2	(Russia) E Alexandrova	7	6

Quarterfinals
Q	(Czech Republic) M Vondroušová	6	7
4	(Ukraine) K Kozlova	2	5
5	(Belgium) M Zanevska	4	0
2	(Russia) E Alexandrova	6	6

Semifinals
Q	(Czech Republic) M Vondroušová	5	3
2	(Russia) E Alexandrova	7	6
