= 2017 Engie Open de Seine-et-Marne – Doubles =

Doubles
- 2017 Engie Open de Seine-et-Marne

Final
- Champions: (Belarus) Vera Lapko (Russia) Polina Monova
- Runners-up: (France) Manon Arcangioli (Poland) Magdalena Fręch
- Score: 6–3, 6–4

Events
Singles	Doubles
← 2016 ·	Open de Seine-et-Marne	· 2018 →

Jocelyn Rae and Anna Smith were the two-time defending champions but lost in the quarterfinals to Manon Arcangioli and Magdalena Fręch.

Vera Lapko and Polina Monova won the title, defeating Arcangioli and Fręch in the final, 6–3, 6–4.

== Seeds ==
1. (United Kingdom) Jocelyn Rae / (United Kingdom) Anna Smith (quarterfinals)
2. (Russia) Anna Kalinskaya / (Czech Republic) Lenka Kunčíková (first round)
3. (Belgium) Elyne Boeykens / (Sweden) Cornelia Lister (first round)
4. (Belarus) Vera Lapko / (Russia) Polina Monova (champions)

== Draw ==
=== Key ===
- Q = Qualifier
- WC = Wild card
- LL = Lucky loser
- Alt = Alternate
- SE = Special exempt
- PR = Protected ranking
- ITF = ITF entry
- JE = Junior exempt
- w/o = Walkover
- r = Retired
- d = Defaulted
- SR = Special ranking

First round
1	(United Kingdom) J Rae (United Kingdom) A Smith	6	6
(Serbia) I Jorović (Bulgaria) A Naydenova	2	3
(France) M Arcangioli (Poland) M Fręch	6	2	[10]
(Uzbekistan) S Sharipova (Russia) E Yashina	2	6	[8]
3	(Belgium) E Boeykens (Sweden) C Lister	3	2
(Switzerland) B Bencic (Switzerland) A Sadiković	6	6
(Ukraine) A Fomina (Russia) A Komardina	7	6
(Bosnia and Herzegovina) A Husarić (Bulgaria) I Shinikova	5	2
(Netherlands) R van der Hoek (Ukraine) A Vasylyeva	6^{2}	5
WC	(Germany) T Korpatsch (France) J Ponchet	7^{7}	7
WC	(France) S Cakarevic (France) C de Bernardi	6^{2}	2
4	(Belarus) V Lapko (Russia) P Monova	7^{7}	6
WC	(France) M Léonard (Bulgaria) J Terziyska	6	6
(Belgium) A-S Mestach (Austria) T Paszek	3	1
(Latvia) D Marcinkēviča (United Kingdom) L Robson	6	5	[10]
2	(Russia) A Kalinskaya (Czech Republic) L Kunčíková	3	7	[7]

Quarterfinals
1	(United Kingdom) J Rae (United Kingdom) A Smith	6^{2}	4
(France) M Arcangioli (Poland) M Fręch	7^{7}	6
(Switzerland) B Bencic (Switzerland) A Sadiković	4	6	[10]
(Ukraine) A Fomina (Russia) A Komardina	6	3	[4]
WC	(Germany) T Korpatsch (France) J Ponchet	4	5
4	(Belarus) V Lapko (Russia) P Monova	6	7
WC	(France) M Léonard (Bulgaria) J Terziyska	7^{7}	4	[11]
(Latvia) D Marcinkēviča (United Kingdom) L Robson	6^{3}	6	[9]

Semifinals
(France) M Arcangioli (Poland) M Fręch	w/o
(Switzerland) B Bencic (Switzerland) A Sadiković
4	(Belarus) V Lapko (Russia) P Monova	6	6
WC	(France) M Léonard (Bulgaria) J Terziyska	0	3

Final
(France) M Arcangioli (Poland) M Fręch	3	4
4	(Belarus) V Lapko (Russia) P Monova	6	6
