= 2016 Engie Open de Seine-et-Marne – Doubles =

Doubles
- 2016 Engie Open de Seine-et-Marne

Final
- Champions: (United Kingdom) Jocelyn Rae (United Kingdom) Anna Smith
- Runners-up: (Czech Republic) Lenka Kunčíková (Czech Republic) Karolína Stuchlá
- Score: 6–4, 6–1

Events
Singles	Doubles
← 2015 ·	Engie Open de Seine-et-Marne	· 2017 →

Jocelyn Rae and Anna Smith were the defending champions and successfully defended their title, defeating Czech-duo Lenka Kunčíková and Karolína Stuchlá in the final, 6–4, 6–1.

== Seeds ==
1. (United Kingdom) Jocelyn Rae / (United Kingdom) Anna Smith (champions)
2. (Switzerland) Xenia Knoll / (Netherlands) Demi Schuurs (quarterfinals)
3. (France) Stéphanie Foretz / (France) Amandine Hesse (quarterfinals)
4. (United Kingdom) Tara Moore / (Switzerland) Conny Perrin (semifinals)

== Draw ==
=== Key ===
- Q = Qualifier
- WC = Wild card
- LL = Lucky loser
- Alt = Alternate
- SE = Special exempt
- PR = Protected ranking
- ITF = ITF entry
- JE = Junior exempt
- w/o = Walkover
- r = Retired
- d = Defaulted
- SR = Special ranking

First round
1	(United Kingdom) J Rae (United Kingdom) A Smith	6	6
(Sweden) C Lister (Georgia (country)) S Shapatava	3	1
WC	(France) T Andrianjafitrimo (Belarus) A Sabalenka	6	4	[13]
(Romania) E Bogdan (Belarus) I Kremen	1	6	[11]
3	(France) S Foretz (France) A Hesse	6	6
(Argentina) T Búa (Austria) S Klemenschits	1	2
(Russia) P Leykina (Bulgaria) I Shinikova	1	3
(Russia) E Kulichkova (Czech Republic) R Voráčová	6	6
WC	(France) J Ponchet (Netherlands) E Vogelsang	2	0
(Spain) G García Pérez (Latvia) D Marcinkēviča	6	6
(Romania) C Dinu (Romania) A Mitu	3	5
4	(United Kingdom) T Moore (Switzerland) C Perrin	6	7
(Russia) A Panova (Russia) N Vikhlyantseva	5	6	[8]
(Czech Republic) L Kunčíková (Czech Republic) K Stuchlá	7	1	[10]
WC	(Ukraine) A Fomina (Russia) E Yashina	4	4
2	(Switzerland) X Knoll (Netherlands) D Schuurs	6	6

Quarterfinals
1	(United Kingdom) J Rae (United Kingdom) A Smith	6	6
WC	(France) T Andrianjafitrimo (Belarus) A Sabalenka	2	4
3	(France) S Foretz (France) A Hesse	6	6^{4}	[6]
(Russia) E Kulichkova (Czech Republic) R Voráčová	4	7^{7}	[10]
(Spain) G García Pérez (Latvia) D Marcinkēviča	5	2
4	(United Kingdom) T Moore (Switzerland) C Perrin	7	6
(Czech Republic) L Kunčíková (Czech Republic) K Stuchlá	6	7
2	(Switzerland) X Knoll (Netherlands) D Schuurs	4	5

Semifinals
1	(United Kingdom) J Rae (United Kingdom) A Smith	w/o
(Russia) E Kulichkova (Czech Republic) R Voráčová
4	(United Kingdom) T Moore (Switzerland) C Perrin	6	4	[6]
(Czech Republic) L Kunčíková (Czech Republic) K Stuchlá	4	6	[10]

Final
1	(United Kingdom) J Rae (United Kingdom) A Smith	6	6
(Czech Republic) L Kunčíková (Czech Republic) K Stuchlá	4	1
