= 2018 Engie Open de Seine-et-Marne =

- Date: 26 March–1 April
- Edition: 6th
- Category: ITF Women's Circuit
- Prize money: $60,000
- Surface: Hard / Indoor
- Location: Croissy-Beaubourg, France

Champions

Singles
- (Russia) Anna Blinkova

Doubles
- (Russia) Anna Kalinskaya / (Slovakia) Viktória Kužmová
← 2017 ·	Open de Seine-et-Marne	· 2019 →

The 2018 Engie Open de Seine-et-Marne was a professional tennis tournament played on indoor hard courts. It was the sixth edition of the tournament and was part of the 2018 ITF Women's Circuit. It took place in Croissy-Beaubourg, France, on 26 March–1 April 2018.

== Singles main draw entrants ==
=== Seeds ===
Country	Player	Rank^{1}	Seed
RUS	Ekaterina Alexandrova	87	1
~~FRA~~	~~Océane Dodin~~	~~98~~	~~2~~
CZE	Denisa Allertová	99	3
SVK	Viktória Kužmová	106	4
FRA	Pauline Parmentier	110	5
NED	Arantxa Rus	119	6
RUS	Anna Blinkova	132	7
POL	Magdalena Fręch	140	8

- ^{1} Rankings as of 19 March 2018.

=== Other entrants ===
The following players received a wildcard into the singles main draw:

- (France) Audrey Albié
- (France) Manon Léonard
- (France) Chloé Paquet
- (France) Jessika Ponchet

The following player received entry using a junior exempt:

- (Russia) Elena Rybakina

The following players received entry from the qualifying draw:

- (Russia) Olga Doroshina
- (Czech Republic) Jesika Malečková
- (Czech Republic) Karolína Muchová
- (France) Harmony Tan

The following players received entry as Lucky Losers:

- (Italy) Cristiana Ferrando
- (Poland) Katarzyna Piter
- (Poland) Urszula Radwańska

== Champions ==
=== Singles ===
- (Russia) Anna Blinkova def. (Czech Republic) Karolína Muchová, walkover

=== Doubles ===
- (Russia) Anna Kalinskaya / (Slovakia) Viktória Kužmová def. (Czech Republic) Petra Krejsová / (Czech Republic) Jesika Malečková, 7–6^{(7–5)}, 6–1
