= 2016 Engie Open de Seine-et-Marne =

- Date: 28 March–3 April
- Edition: 4th
- Category: ITF Women's Circuit
- Prize money: $50,000
- Surface: Hard / Indoor
- Location: Croissy-Beaubourg, France

Champions

Singles
- (Serbia) Ivana Jorović

Doubles
- (United Kingdom) Jocelyn Rae / (United Kingdom) Anna Smith
← 2015 ·	Engie Open de Seine-et-Marne	· 2017 →

The 2016 Engie Open de Seine-et-Marne was a professional tennis tournament played on indoor hard courts. It was the fourth edition of the tournament and part of the 2016 ITF Women's Circuit, offering a total of $50,000 in prize money. It took place in Croissy-Beaubourg, France, on 28 March – 3 April 2016.

== Singles main draw entrants ==
=== Seeds ===
Country	Player	Rank^{1}	Seed
RUS	Elizaveta Kulichkova	99	1
FRA	Pauline Parmentier	111	2
ROU	Andreea Mitu	112	3
SUI	Stefanie Vögele	115	4
SUI	Romina Oprandi	133	5
CZE	Tereza Smitková	144	6
ROU	Sorana Cîrstea	147	7
FRA	Océane Dodin	160	8

- ^{1} Rankings as of 21 March 2016.

=== Other entrants ===
The following players received wildcards into the singles main draw:

- (France) Joséphine Boualem
- (France) Fiona Ferro
- (France) Claire Feuerstein
- (Romania) Andreea Mitu

The following players received entry from the qualifying draw:

- (Ukraine) Olga Fridman
- (Greece) Valentini Grammatikopoulou
- (United Kingdom) Tara Moore
- (Bulgaria) Julia Terziyska

The following player received entry by a junior exempt:

- (Russia) Anna Blinkova

== Champions ==
=== Singles ===
- (Serbia) Ivana Jorović def. (France) Pauline Parmentier, 6–1, 4–6, 6–4

=== Doubles ===
- (United Kingdom) Jocelyn Rae / (United Kingdom) Anna Smith def. (Czech Republic) Lenka Kunčíková / (Czech Republic) Karolína Stuchlá, 6–4, 6–1
