= 2019 Engie Open de Seine-et-Marne – Doubles =

Doubles
- 2019 Engie Open de Seine-et-Marne

Final
- Champions: (United Kingdom) Harriet Dart (Netherlands) Lesley Kerkhove
- Runners-up: (United Kingdom) Sarah Beth Grey (United Kingdom) Eden Silva
- Score: 6–3, 6–2

Events
Singles	Doubles
- Open de Seine-et-Marne

Anna Kalinskaya and Viktória Kužmová were the defending champions, but chose not to participate.

Harriet Dart and Lesley Kerkhove won the title, defeating Sarah Beth Grey and Eden Silva in the final, 6–3, 6–2.

== Seeds ==
1. (United Kingdom) Harriet Dart / (Netherlands) Lesley Kerkhove (champions)
2. (India) Prarthana Thombare / (Russia) Ekaterina Yashina (quarterfinals)
3. (Chinese Taipei) Chen Pei-hsuan / (Chinese Taipei) Wu Fang-hsien (semifinals)
4. (Russia) Olga Doroshina / (Russia) Polina Monova (first round)

== Draw ==
Key

- Q = Qualifier
- WC = Wild card
- LL = Lucky loser
- Alt = Alternate
- ITF = ITF entry
- PR = Protected ranking
- SR = Special ranking
- SE = Special exempt
- JE = Junior exempt
- JR = Junior Accelerator Programme entrant
- CO = College Accelerator Programme entrant
- NG = Next Gen Accelerator Program entrant
- w/o = Walkover
- r = Retired
- d = Defaulted

=== Draw ===
First round
1	(United Kingdom) H Dart (Netherlands) L Kerkhove	3	7	[10]
(France) J Ponchet (Bulgaria) I Shinikova	6	5	[8]
(United States) R Anderson (United States) M Manasse	5	0^{r}
(Belgium) G Minnen (Belgium) M Zanevska	7	1
4	(Russia) O Doroshina (Russia) P Monova	2	1
(Spain) C Bucșa (Latvia) D Marcinkēviča	6	6
(Slovakia) R Šramková (Bulgaria) J Terziyska	6	6
(Turkey) P Özgen (Georgia (country)) S Shapatava	3	2
(France) E Lechemia (Netherlands) R van der Hoek	6	3	[9]
WC	(Cambodia) A Ka (France) M Léonard	3	6	[11]
(Norway) U Eikeri (Switzerland) Y In-Albon	6	3	[4]
3	(Chinese Taipei) P-h Chen (Chinese Taipei) F-h Wu	2	6	[10]
(France) A Hesse (Germany) T Korpatsch	5	1
(United Kingdom) SB Grey (United Kingdom) E Silva	7	6
(Belarus) I Kremen (Czech Republic) T Smitková	6	6^{3}	[6]
2	(India) P Thombare (Russia) E Yashina	0	7^{7}	[10]

Quarterfinals
1	(United Kingdom) H Dart (Netherlands) L Kerkhove	w/o
(Belgium) G Minnen (Belgium) M Zanevska
(Spain) C Bucșa (Latvia) D Marcinkēviča	4	3
(Slovakia) R Šramková (Bulgaria) J Terziyska	6	6
WC	(Cambodia) A Ka (France) M Léonard	3	3
3	(Chinese Taipei) P-h Chen (Chinese Taipei) F-h Wu	6	6
(United Kingdom) SB Grey (United Kingdom) E Silva	4	6	[10]
2	(India) P Thombare (Russia) E Yashina	6	3	[8]

Semifinals
1	(United Kingdom) H Dart (Netherlands) L Kerkhove	6	6
(Slovakia) R Šramková (Bulgaria) J Terziyska	1	4
3	(Chinese Taipei) P-h Chen (Chinese Taipei) F-h Wu	5	6	[8]
(United Kingdom) SB Grey (United Kingdom) E Silva	7	4	[10]

Final
1	(United Kingdom) H Dart (Netherlands) L Kerkhove	6	6
(United Kingdom) SB Grey (United Kingdom) E Silva	3	2
