= 2019 Shimadzu All Japan Indoor Tennis Championships – Doubles =

Doubles
- 2019 Shimadzu All Japan Indoor Tennis Championships

Final
- Champions: (Japan) Eri Hozumi (Japan) Moyuka Uchijima
- Runners-up: (Chinese Taipei) Chen Pei-hsuan (Chinese Taipei) Wu Fang-hsien
- Score: 6–4, 6–3

Events
Singles	Doubles
Shimadzu All Japan Indoor Tennis Championships	· 2020 →

This was the first edition of the women's tournament.

Eri Hozumi and Moyuka Uchijima won the title, defeating Chen Pei-hsuan and Wu Fang-hsien in the final, 6–4, 6–3.

== Seeds ==
1. (Japan) Momoko Kobori / (Japan) Ayano Shimizu (first round)
2. (Chinese Taipei) Chen Pei-hsuan / (Chinese Taipei) Wu Fang-hsien (final)
3. (Australia) Olivia Tjandramulia / (China) You Xiaodi (first round)
4. (Indonesia) Beatrice Gumulya / (Indonesia) Jessy Rompies (first round)

== Draw ==
=== Key ===
- Q = Qualifier
- WC = Wild card
- LL = Lucky loser
- Alt = Alternate
- SE = Special exempt
- PR = Protected ranking
- ITF = ITF entry
- JE = Junior exempt
- w/o = Walkover
- r = Retired
- d = Defaulted
- SR = Special ranking

=== Draw ===
First round
1	(Japan) M Kobori (Japan) A Shimizu	1	6	[7]
(Chinese Taipei) E-s Liang (China) K Zhang	6	0	[10]
(China) F Liu (Japan) E Sema	4	7^{7}	[12]
(Japan) M Imanishi (Japan) A Omae	6	6^{5}	[10]
4	(Indonesia) B Gumulya (Indonesia) J Rompies	0	6^{6}
(Japan) E Hozumi (Japan) M Uchijima	6	7^{8}
(Japan) J Namigata (Thailand) P Plipuech	6	7^{11}
WC	(Japan) R Kajitani (Japan) M Nishimoto	2	6^{9}
(Norway) U Eikeri (Switzerland) Y In-Albon	6	6
(Australia) N Bains (Chinese Taipei) Y-h Lee	4	3
WC	(Japan) K Nara (Thailand) T Tanasugarn	6	2	[10]
3	(Australia) O Tjandramulia (China) X You	3	6	[7]
WC	(Japan) H Kaji (Japan) H Kuwata	6	6
(South Korea) J-h Choi (Japan) M Minokoshi	3	1
(China) J Kang (China) F Xun	6	6^{6}	[8]
2	(Chinese Taipei) P-h Chen (Chinese Taipei) F-h Wu	2	7^{8}	[10]

Quarterfinals
(Chinese Taipei) E-s Liang (China) K Zhang	6^{2}	6	[8]
(China) F Liu (Japan) E Sema	7^{7}	1	[10]
(Japan) E Hozumi (Japan) M Uchijima	7^{7}	6
(Japan) J Namigata (Thailand) P Plipuech	6^{5}	4
(Norway) U Eikeri (Switzerland) Y In-Albon	3	4
WC	(Japan) K Nara (Thailand) T Tanasugarn	6	6
WC	(Japan) H Kaji (Japan) H Kuwata	7^{8}	4	[8]
2	(Chinese Taipei) P-h Chen (Chinese Taipei) F-h Wu	6^{6}	6	[10]

Semifinals
(China) F Liu (Japan) E Sema	6	4	[5]
(Japan) E Hozumi (Japan) M Uchijima	3	6	[10]
WC	(Japan) K Nara (Thailand) T Tanasugarn	6	3	[2]
2	(Chinese Taipei) P-h Chen (Chinese Taipei) F-h Wu	4	6	[10]

Final
(Japan) E Hozumi (Japan) M Uchijima	6	6
2	(Chinese Taipei) P-h Chen (Chinese Taipei) F-h Wu	4	3
