= 2019 Engie Open de Seine-et-Marne – Singles =

Singles
- 2019 Engie Open de Seine-et-Marne

Final
- Champion: (Russia) Vitalia Diatchenko
- Runner-up: (United States) Robin Anderson
- Score: 6–2, 6–3

Events
Singles	Doubles
← 2018 ·	Open de Seine-et-Marne	· 2020 →

Anna Blinkova was the defending champion, but chose not to participate.

Vitalia Diatchenko won the title, defeating Robin Anderson in the final, 6–2, 6–3.

== Seeds ==
1. (Russia) Vitalia Diatchenko (champion)
2. (Germany) Tamara Korpatsch (first round)
3. (Czech Republic) Tereza Smitková (semifinals)
4. (Spain) Paula Badosa Gibert (second round)
5. (United Kingdom) Harriet Dart (semifinals)
6. (Bulgaria) Viktoriya Tomova (quarterfinals)
7. (Kazakhstan) Elena Rybakina (second round)
8. (Spain) Georgina García Pérez (second round)

== Draw ==
=== Key ===
- Q = Qualifier
- WC = Wild card
- LL = Lucky loser
- Alt = Alternate
- SE = Special exempt
- PR = Protected ranking
- ITF = ITF entry
- JE = Junior exempt
- w/o = Walkover
- r = Retired
- d = Defaulted
- SR = Special ranking

=== Finals ===
Semifinals
1	(Russia) Vitalia Diatchenko	7^{8}	6
3	(Czech Republic) Tereza Smitková	6^{6}	3
(United States) Robin Anderson	6	6
5	(United Kingdom) Harriet Dart	2	3

Final
1	(Russia) Vitalia Diatchenko	6	6
(United States) Robin Anderson	2	3

=== Top half ===
First round
1	(Russia) V Diatchenko	4	6	6
Q	(France) J Gervais	6	4	3
(Netherlands) L Kerkhove	7^{7}	4	6^{4}
(Germany) A Lottner	6^{2}	6	7^{7}
(Belgium) M Zanevska	6	7^{7}
WC	(France) A Lim	1	6^{3}
Q	(France) A Albié	3	1
7	(Kazakhstan) E Rybakina	6	6
3	(Czech Republic) T Smitková	6	6
Q	(Norway) U Eikeri	4	0
(France) A Hesse	2	3
(France) J Ponchet	6	6
LL	(United States) M Manasse	6^{2}	7^{7}	7^{8}
WC	(France) M Léonard	7^{7}	6^{3}	6^{6}
(Romania) A Cadanțu	2	6	2
6	(Bulgaria) V Tomova	6	4	6

Second round
1	(Russia) V Diatchenko	6	6
(Germany) A Lottner	1	3
(Belgium) M Zanevska	6	2	6
7	(Kazakhstan) E Rybakina	4	6	4
3	(Czech Republic) T Smitková	6	3	7^{8}
(France) J Ponchet	4	6	6^{6}
LL	(United States) M Manasse	3	4
6	(Bulgaria) V Tomova	6	6

Quarterfinals
1	(Russia) V Diatchenko	6	6^{4}	6
(Belgium) M Zanevska	0	7^{7}	3
3	(Czech Republic) T Smitková	6	6
6	(Bulgaria) V Tomova	3	2

Semifinals
1	(Russia) V Diatchenko	7^{8}	6
3	(Czech Republic) T Smitková	6^{6}	3

=== Bottom half ===
First round
8	(Spain) G García Pérez	6	6
(Bulgaria) I Shinikova	4	4
(Russia) O Doroshina	4	3
(France) M Georges	6	6
(United States) R Anderson	6	7
(Turkey) P Özgen	3	5
(Slovakia) R Šramková	6^{4}	3
4	(Spain) P Badosa Gibert	7^{7}	6
5	(United Kingdom) H Dart	6	4	6
(Belgium) G Minnen	4	6	2
Q	(Spain) C Bucșa	6	6
(Switzerland) Y In-Albon	4	4
WC	(France) S Reix	6	5	2
Q	(Italy) C Ferrando	4	7	6
Q	(Romania) L-I Paar	6	6
2	(Germany) T Korpatsch	2	0

Second round
8	(Spain) G García Pérez	6	3	3
(France) M Georges	2	6	6
(United States) R Anderson	4	6	6
4	(Spain) P Badosa Gibert	6	1	4
5	(United Kingdom) H Dart	6	2	7^{7}
Q	(Spain) C Bucșa	2	6	6^{0}
Q	(Italy) C Ferrando	6	2	4
Q	(Romania) L-I Paar	4	6	6

Quarterfinals
(France) M Georges
(United States) R Anderson	w/o
5	(United Kingdom) H Dart	3	6	6
Q	(Romania) L-I Paar	6	1	4

Semifinals
(United States) R Anderson	6	6
5	(United Kingdom) H Dart	2	3
