= 2019 Shimadzu All Japan Indoor Tennis Championships – Singles =

Singles
- 2019 Shimadzu All Japan Indoor Tennis Championships

Final
- Champion: (Switzerland) Ylena In-Albon
- Runner-up: (China) Zhang Kailin
- Score: 6–2, 6–3

Events
| Singles | Doubles |
| Shimadzu All Japan Indoor Tennis Championships | · 2020 → |

This was the first edition of the women's tournament.

Ylena In-Albon won the title, defeating Zhang Kailin in the final, 6–2, 6–3.

== Seeds ==
1. (Japan) Nao Hibino (semifinals)
2. (Japan) Kurumi Nara (quarterfinals)
3. (China) Liu Fangzhou (second round)
4. (Japan) Ayano Shimizu (first round)
5. (China) Xun Fangying (first round)
6. (Chinese Taipei) Liang En-shuo (first round)
7. (Switzerland) Ylena In-Albon (champion)
8. (China) Zhang Kailin (final)

== Draw ==
=== Key ===
- Q = Qualifier
- WC = Wild card
- LL = Lucky loser
- Alt = Alternate
- SE = Special exempt
- PR = Protected ranking
- ITF = ITF entry
- JE = Junior exempt
- w/o = Walkover
- r = Retired
- d = Defaulted
- SR = Special ranking

=== Finals ===
Semifinals
1 | (Japan) Nao Hibino | 2 | 4
8 | (China) Zhang Kailin | 6 | 6
(United States) Robin Anderson | 7 | 4 | 2
7 | (Switzerland) Ylena In-Albon | 5 | 6 | 6

Final
8 | (China) Zhang Kailin | 2 | 3
7 | (Switzerland) Ylena In-Albon | 6 | 6

=== Top half ===
First round
1 | (Japan) N Hibino | 6 | 6
Q | (Japan) M Nishimoto | 3 | 3
(Australia) N Bains | 6 | 4 | 7^{7}
(Japan) J Namigata | 4 | 6 | 6^{2}
(Thailand) P Plipuech | 6 | 6
Q | (Hong Kong) L Zhang | 4 | 2
(Belgium) G Minnen | 7^{7} | 6
6 | (Chinese Taipei) E-s Liang | 6^{4} | 2
4 | (Japan) A Shimizu | 4 | 2
WC | (Japan) M Imanishi | 6 | 6
WC | (Japan) H Kaji | 3 | 6 | 6
(Poland) K Kawa | 6 | 2 | 1
(Australia) A Myers | 6 | 6^{4} | 3
(Japan) M Kobori | 2 | 7^{7} | 6
(Japan) M Minokoshi | 6 | 0 | 2
8 | (China) K Zhang | 4 | 6 | 6

Second round
1 | (Japan) N Hibino | 6 | 6
(Australia) N Bains | 1 | 4
(Thailand) P Plipuech | 2 | 6 | 3
(Belgium) G Minnen | 6 | 3 | 6
WC | (Japan) M Imanishi | 6 | 6
WC | (Japan) H Kaji | 3 | 1
(Japan) M Kobori | 2 | 4
8 | (China) K Zhang | 6 | 6

Quarterfinals
1 | (Japan) N Hibino | 6 | 6
(Belgium) G Minnen | 1 | 1
WC | (Japan) M Imanishi | 6 | 4 | 2
8 | (China) K Zhang | 2 | 6 | 6

Semifinals
1 | (Japan) N Hibino | 2 | 4
8 | (China) K Zhang | 6 | 6

=== Bottom half ===
First round
5 | (China) F Xun | 6^{5} | 1
WC | (Japan) N Sato | 7^{7} | 6
(United States) R Anderson | 6 | 7
(Russia) M Melnikova | 1 | 5
Q | (Japan) K Okamura | 7^{7} | 2 | 6
Q | (Japan) M Uchijima | 6^{2} | 6 | 0
(Japan) H Kuwata | 3 | 1
3 | (China) F Liu | 6 | 6
7 | (Switzerland) Y In-Albon | 6 | 6
(Japan) R Ozaki | 1 | 4
(Chinese Taipei) Y-h Lee | 6^{7} | 6^{3}
Q | (Japan) A Omae | 7^{9} | 7^{7}
Q | (Japan) E Hozumi | 3 | 1
WC | (Japan) M Hontama | 6 | 6
(South Korea) S-j Jang | 6 | 4 | 4
2 | (Japan) K Nara | 4 | 6 | 6

Second round
WC | (Japan) N Sato | 1 | 2
(United States) R Anderson | 6 | 6
Q | (Japan) K Okamura | 6 | 2 | 6
3 | (China) F Liu | 3 | 6 | 2
7 | (Switzerland) Y In-Albon | 6 | 6^{3} | 6
Q | (Japan) A Omae | 4 | 7^{7} | 2
WC | (Japan) M Hontama | 6 | 6^{1} | 3
2 | (Japan) K Nara | 3 | 7^{7} | 6

Quarterfinals
(United States) R Anderson | 6 | 6
Q | (Japan) K Okamura | 3 | 1
7 | (Switzerland) Y In-Albon | 6 | 7^{7}
2 | (Japan) K Nara | 4 | 6^{2}

Semifinals
(United States) R Anderson | 7 | 4 | 2
7 | (Switzerland) Y In-Albon | 5 | 6 | 6
