= 2019 Engie Open de Seine-et-Marne =

- Date: 25–31 March 2019
- Edition: 7th
- Category: ITF Women's World Tennis Tour
- Prize money: $60,000
- Surface: Hard / Indoor
- Location: Croissy-Beaubourg, France

Champions

Singles
- (Russia) Vitalia Diatchenko

Doubles
- (United Kingdom) Harriet Dart / (Netherlands) Lesley Kerkhove
| ← 2018 · | Open de Seine-et-Marne | · 2020 → |

The 2019 Engie Open de Seine-et-Marne was a professional tennis tournament played on indoor hard courts. It was the seventh edition of the tournament which was part of the 2019 ITF Women's World Tennis Tour. It took place in Croissy-Beaubourg, France between 25 and 31 March 2019.

== Singles main-draw entrants ==
=== Seeds ===
| Country | Player | Rank^{1} | Seed |
|---|---|---|---|
| RUS | Vitalia Diatchenko | 106 | 1 |
| GER | Tamara Korpatsch | 128 | 2 |
| CZE | Tereza Smitková | 129 | 3 |
| ESP | Paula Badosa Gibert | 130 | 4 |
| GBR | Harriet Dart | 140 | 5 |
| BUL | Viktoriya Tomova | 152 | 6 |
| KAZ | Elena Rybakina | 163 | 7 |
| ESP | Georgina García Pérez | 173 | 8 |

- ^{1} Rankings are as of 18 March 2019.

=== Other entrants ===
The following players received wildcards into the singles main draw:

- (France) Manon Léonard
- (France) Alizé Lim
- (France) Shérazad Reix

The following players received entry from the qualifying draw:

- (France) Audrey Albié
- (Spain) Cristina Bucșa
- (Norway) Ulrikke Eikeri
- (Italy) Cristiana Ferrando
- (France) Julie Gervais
- (Romania) Laura-Ioana Paar

== Champions ==
=== Singles ===
- (Russia) Vitalia Diatchenko def. (United States) Robin Anderson, 6–2, 6–3

=== Doubles ===
- (United Kingdom) Harriet Dart / (Netherlands) Lesley Kerkhove def. (United Kingdom) Sarah Beth Grey / (United Kingdom) Eden Silva, 6–3, 6–2
