= Chen Pei-hsuan =

Taiwanese tennis player

- Country (sports): Chinese Taipei
- Born: 28 February 2000 (age 25)
- Plays: Right (two-handed backhand)
- Prize money: $26,026

Singles
- Career record: 43–29
- Career titles: 0
- Highest ranking: No. 919 (11 June 2018)

Doubles
- Career record: 87–46
- Career titles: 9 ITF
- Highest ranking: No. 160 (25 February 2019)

Chen Pei-hsuan (Chinese: 陳佩萱; born 28 February 2000) is a Taiwanese inactive tennis player.

She has a career-high WTA doubles ranking of 160, achieved on 25 February 2019. On 11 June 2018, she peaked at No. 919 of the WTA singles rankings. In her career, she won nine doubles titles on the ITF Women's Circuit, each time partnering Wu Fang-hsien.

Chen made her WTA Tour debut at the 2018 Washington Open, in the doubles draw, partnering with Wu Fang-hsien.

== ITF Circuit finals ==
=== Doubles: 21 (9 titles, 12 runner–ups) ===
Legend
$60,000 tournaments
$25,000 tournaments
$15,000 tournaments
$10,000 tournaments

Result	W–L	Date	Tournament	Tier	Surface	Partner	Opponents	Score
Loss	0–1	Jun 2016	ITF Kaohsiung, Taiwan	10,000	Hard	(Chinese Taipei) Wu Fang-hsien	(Japan) Erina Hayashi (Japan) Haruka Kaji	4–6, 6–3, [7–10]
Loss	0–2	Jul 2017	ITF Sharm El Sheik, Egypt	15,000	Hard	(Chinese Taipei) Wu Fang-hsien	(India) Rutuja Bhosale (Egypt) Mayar Sherif	6–3, 3–6, [5–10]
Win	1–2	Jul 2017	ITF Sharm El Sheik, Egypt	15,000	Hard	(Chinese Taipei) Wu Fang-hsien	(Romania) Ana Bianca Mihaila (China) Zhao Xiaoxi	6–2, 6–1
Win	2–2	Aug 2017	ITF Sharm El Sheik, Egypt	15,000	Hard	(Chinese Taipei) Wu Fang-hsien	(Romania) Ana Bianca Mihaila (China) Zhao Xiaoxi	6–4, 6–2
Win	3–2	Sep 2017	ITF Sharm El Sheik, Egypt	15,000	Hard	(Chinese Taipei) Wu Fang-hsien	(Chinese Taipei) Hsieh Yu-ting (Chinese Taipei) Lee Pei-chi	7–6, 3–6, [11–9]
Win	4–2	Sep 2017	ITF Sharm El Sheik, Egypt	15,000	Hard	(Chinese Taipei) Wu Fang-hsien	(Chinese Taipei) Lee Pei-chi (India) Kanika Vaidya	6–0, 1–6, [10–7]
Win	5–2	Dec 2017	ITF Hong Kong	15,000	Hard	(Chinese Taipei) Wu Fang-hsien	(Chinese Taipei) Chan Chin-wei (China) Lu Jiaxi	6–1, 6–0
Loss	5–3	Jan 2018	ITF Hong Kong	15,000	Hard	(Chinese Taipei) Wu Fang-hsien	(United States) Yuki Kristina Chiang (Belgium) Helène Scholsen	2–6, 3–6
Loss	5–4	Apr 2018	ITF Sharm El Sheik, Egypt	15,000	Hard	(Chinese Taipei) Wu Fang-hsien	(Belarus) Iryna Shymanovich (Bulgaria) Julia Terziyska	6–4, 6–2
Loss	5–5	May 2018	ITF Rome, Italy	25,000	Clay	(Chinese Taipei) Wu Fang-hsien	(Switzerland) Conny Perrin (South Africa) Chanel Simmonds	7–6^{(0)}, 1–6, [7–10]
Win	6–5	May 2018	ITF San Severo, Italy	15,000	Clay	(Chinese Taipei) Wu Fang-hsien	(Belarus) Sviatlana Pirazhenka (Georgia (country)) Sofia Shapatava	6–3, 6–4
Win	7–5	May 2018	ITF Caserta, Italy	25,000	Clay	(Chinese Taipei) Wu Fang-hsien	(Australia) Jaimee Fourlis (Australia) Ellen Perez	7–6^{(6)}, 6–3
Loss	7–6	Jun 2018	ITF Ystad, Sweden	25,000	Clay	(Chinese Taipei) Wu Fang-hsien	(United Kingdom) Emily Arbuthnott (Denmark) Emilie Francati	2–6, 1–6
Win	8–6	Jun 2018	ITF Båstad, Sweden	25,000	Clay	(Chinese Taipei) Wu Fang-hsien	(Kazakhstan) Anna Danilina (Switzerland) Karin Kennel	7–5, 1–6, [10–5]
Loss	8–7	Jul 2018	ITF Nonthaburi, India	25,000	Hard	(Chinese Taipei) Wu Fang-hsien	(India) Rutuja Bhosale (India) Pranjala Yadlapalli	5–7, 2–6
Loss	8–8	Aug 2018	Landisville Challenge, United States	60,000	Hard (i)	(Chinese Taipei) Wu Fang-hsien	(Australia) Ellen Perez (Australia) Arina Rodionova	0–6, 2–6
Loss	8–9	Jan 2019	ITF Hong Kong	25,000	Hard	(Chinese Taipei) Wu Fang-hsien	(Netherlands) Michaëlla Krajicek (Czech Republic) Barbora Štefková	4–6, 7–6^{(3)}, [10–12]
Win	9–9	Jan 2019	ITF Hong Kong	25,000	Hard	(Chinese Taipei) Wu Fang-hsien	(Japan) Robu Kajitani (Japan) Hiroko Kuwata	6–3, 6–3
Loss	9–10	Jan 2019	ITF Singapore	25,000	Hard	(Chinese Taipei) Wu Fang-hsien	(Netherlands) Quirine Lemoine (Netherlands) Arantxa Rus	2–6, 4–6
Loss	9–11	Feb 2019	All Japan Indoor Championships	60,000	Hard (i)	(Chinese Taipei) Wu Fang-hsien	(Japan) Eri Hozumi (Japan) Moyuka Uchijima	4–6, 3–6
Loss	9–12	Sep 2022	ITF Sharm El Sheikh, Egypt	15,000	Hard	(Chinese Taipei) Lin Fang-an	Aliona Falei (Georgia (country)) Nino Natsvlishvili	3–6, 4–6
