= 2015 ITF Women's Circuit (January–March) =

The 2015 ITF Women's Circuit is the 2015 edition of the second-tier tour for women's professional tennis. It is organised by the International Tennis Federation and is a tier below the WTA Tour. The ITF Women's Circuit includes tournaments with prize money ranging from $10,000 up to $100,000.

== Key ==
$100,000 tournaments
$75,000 tournaments
$50,000 tournaments
$25,000 tournaments
$15,000 tournaments
$10,000 tournaments

== Month ==
=== January ===
Week of	Tournament	Winner	Runners-up	Semifinalists	Quarterfinalists
December 29	Hong Kong; Hard $10,000; Singles and doubles draws	(Japan) Mizuno Kijima; 6–2, 6–1	(Japan) Akiko Omae	(Hong Kong) Zhang Ling (China) Zhang Yuxuan	(South Korea) Choi Ji-hee (Japan) Kyōka Okamura (South Korea) Jang Su-jeong (Russia) Vera Zvonareva
December 29	Hong Kong; Hard $10,000; Singles and doubles draws	(Japan) Mana Ayukawa (Japan) Makoto Ninomiya; 7–6^{(7–4)}, 2–6, [10–7]	(China) Tang Haochen (China) Ye Qiuyu	(Hong Kong) Zhang Ling (China) Zhang Yuxuan	(South Korea) Choi Ji-hee (Japan) Kyōka Okamura (South Korea) Jang Su-jeong (Russia) Vera Zvonareva
January 5	ITF Women's Circuit – Hong Kong; Hong Kong; Hard $50,000; Singles – Doubles	(Japan) Misaki Doi; 6–3, 6–3	(China) Zhang Kailin	(South Korea) Han Na-lae (Japan) Hiroko Kuwata	(Liechtenstein) Stephanie Vogt (Russia) Ekaterina Bychkova (Japan) Naomi Osaka (Chinese Taipei) Chan Yung-jan
January 5	ITF Women's Circuit – Hong Kong; Hong Kong; Hard $50,000; Singles – Doubles	(China) Han Xinyun (Chinese Taipei) Hsu Chieh-yu; 3–6, 6–4, [10–8]	(Thailand) Varatchaya Wongteanchai (Thailand) Varunya Wongteanchai	(South Korea) Han Na-lae (Japan) Hiroko Kuwata	(Liechtenstein) Stephanie Vogt (Russia) Ekaterina Bychkova (Japan) Naomi Osaka (Chinese Taipei) Chan Yung-jan
January 5	Antalya, Turkey; Clay $10,000; Singles and doubles draws	(Germany) Anne Schäfer; 4–0, ret.	(Netherlands) Elke Tiel	(Switzerland) Sandy Marti (Bosnia and Herzegovina) Anita Husarić	(Turkey) Ayla Aksu (Romania) Cristina Adamescu (Belgium) Victoria Smirnova (Slovenia) Pia Čuk
January 5	Antalya, Turkey; Clay $10,000; Singles and doubles draws	(Bosnia and Herzegovina) Anita Husarić (United States) Danielle Mills; 6–4, 4–6, [12–10]	(Germany) Anne Schäfer (Slovakia) Lenka Wienerová	(Switzerland) Sandy Marti (Bosnia and Herzegovina) Anita Husarić	(Turkey) Ayla Aksu (Romania) Cristina Adamescu (Belgium) Victoria Smirnova (Slovenia) Pia Čuk
January 12	Plantation, United States; Clay $25,000; Singles and doubles draws	(United States) Sachia Vickery; 6–3, 6–1	(United States) Samantha Crawford	(Belgium) Elise Mertens (Russia) Darya Kasatkina	(Romania) Edina Gallovits-Hall (United States) Robin Anderson (United States) Kristie Ahn (Italy) Maria Elena Camerin
January 12	Plantation, United States; Clay $25,000; Singles and doubles draws	(Russia) Irina Khromacheva (United States) Asia Muhammad; 6–2, 6–2	(United States) Jan Abaza (United States) Sanaz Marand	(Belgium) Elise Mertens (Russia) Darya Kasatkina	(Romania) Edina Gallovits-Hall (United States) Robin Anderson (United States) Kristie Ahn (Italy) Maria Elena Camerin
January 12	Sharm el-Sheikh, Egypt; Hard $10,000; Singles and doubles draws	(Philippines) Katharina Lehnert; 7–5, 3–6, 6–4	(Netherlands) Eva Wacanno	(United Kingdom) Francesca Stephenson (Austria) Pia König	(Bulgaria) Aleksandrina Naydenova (Czech Republic) Simona Heinová (Japan) Yuuki Tanaka (Russia) Anastasiya Komardina
January 12	Sharm el-Sheikh, Egypt; Hard $10,000; Singles and doubles draws	(Austria) Pia König (Netherlands) Eva Wacanno; 4–6, 7–6^{(7–2)}, [10–5]	(Italy) Camilla Rosatello (Japan) Yuuki Tanaka	(United Kingdom) Francesca Stephenson (Austria) Pia König	(Bulgaria) Aleksandrina Naydenova (Czech Republic) Simona Heinová (Japan) Yuuki Tanaka (Russia) Anastasiya Komardina
January 12	Fort-de-France, Martinique, France; Hard $10,000; Singles and doubles draws	(Canada) Gloria Liang; 3–6, 6–4, 6–0	(United States) Alexa Graham	(France) Irina Ramialison (Hungary) Naomi Totka	(United States) Nicole Frenkel (United States) Alexa Guarachi (France) Sherazad Reix (Argentina) Victoria Bosio
January 12	Fort-de-France, Martinique, France; Hard $10,000; Singles and doubles draws	(United States) Alexa Guarachi (France) Sherazad Reix; 6–2, 6–1	(Canada) Rosie Johanson (Canada) Gloria Liang	(France) Irina Ramialison (Hungary) Naomi Totka	(United States) Nicole Frenkel (United States) Alexa Guarachi (France) Sherazad Reix (Argentina) Victoria Bosio
January 12	Stuttgart, Germany; Hard (indoor) $10,000; Singles and doubles draws	(Germany) Antonia Lottner; 3–6, 6–3, 6–2	(Turkey) Pemra Özgen	(Czech Republic) Karolína Stuchlá (Germany) Sina Haas	(Slovenia) Dalila Jakupović (Bulgaria) Julia Terziyska (Czech Republic) Martina Borecká (Czech Republic) Kateřina Vaňková
January 12	Stuttgart, Germany; Hard (indoor) $10,000; Singles and doubles draws	(Czech Republic) Lenka Kunčíková (Czech Republic) Karolína Stuchlá; 6–2, 6–3	(Czech Republic) Martina Borecká (Czech Republic) Jesika Malečková	(Czech Republic) Karolína Stuchlá (Germany) Sina Haas	(Slovenia) Dalila Jakupović (Bulgaria) Julia Terziyska (Czech Republic) Martina Borecká (Czech Republic) Kateřina Vaňková
January 12	Port El Kantaoui, Tunisia; Hard $10,000; Singles and doubles draws	(France) Myrtille Georges; 6–4, 6–2	(France) Estelle Cascino	(Italy) Jessica Pieri (France) Céline Ghesquière	(Czech Republic) Kristýna Hrabalová (Egypt) Sandra Samir (France) Amandine Cazeaux (Kazakhstan) Anna Danilina
January 12	Port El Kantaoui, Tunisia; Hard $10,000; Singles and doubles draws	(France) Myrtille Georges (France) Céline Ghesquière; 6–7^{(6–8)}, 6–2, [10–5]	(Czech Republic) Kristýna Hrabalová (Czech Republic) Vendula Žovincová	(Italy) Jessica Pieri (France) Céline Ghesquière	(Czech Republic) Kristýna Hrabalová (Egypt) Sandra Samir (France) Amandine Cazeaux (Kazakhstan) Anna Danilina
January 12	Antalya, Turkey; Clay $10,000; Singles and doubles draws	(Slovakia) Petra Uberalová; 6–4, 7–6^{(7–2)}	(Germany) Anne Schäfer	(Bulgaria) Petia Arshinkova (France) Audrey Albié	(Belgium) Eugénie Chapelle (Germany) Charlotte Klasen (Slovenia) Pia Čuk (Georgia (country)) Ekaterine Gorgodze
January 12	Antalya, Turkey; Clay $10,000; Singles and doubles draws	(Germany) Anne Schäfer (Slovakia) Lenka Wienerová; 6–4, 6–4	(France) Audrey Albié (France) Alice Bacquié	(Bulgaria) Petia Arshinkova (France) Audrey Albié	(Belgium) Eugénie Chapelle (Germany) Charlotte Klasen (Slovenia) Pia Čuk (Georgia (country)) Ekaterine Gorgodze
January 19	Daytona Beach, United States; Clay $25,000; Singles and doubles draws	(Russia) Darya Kasatkina; 6–2, 4–6, 6–0	(Belgium) Elise Mertens	(Netherlands) Arantxa Rus (Spain) Sara Sorribes Tormo	(Brazil) Paula Cristina Gonçalves (Sweden) Sofia Arvidsson (Netherlands) Indy de Vroome (United States) Samantha Crawford
January 19	Daytona Beach, United States; Clay $25,000; Singles and doubles draws	(United States) Jan Abaza (United States) Sanaz Marand; 6–4, 3–6, [10–6]	(Belgium) Elise Mertens (Netherlands) Arantxa Rus	(Netherlands) Arantxa Rus (Spain) Sara Sorribes Tormo	(Brazil) Paula Cristina Gonçalves (Sweden) Sofia Arvidsson (Netherlands) Indy de Vroome (United States) Samantha Crawford
January 19	Sharm el-Sheikh, Egypt; Hard $10,000; Singles and doubles draws	(Bulgaria) Aleksandrina Naydenova; 6–3, 6–4	(Austria) Pia König	(United Kingdom) Eden Silva (Greece) Despina Papamichail	(Japan) Shiho Akita (Philippines) Katharina Lehnert (Japan) Yuuki Tanaka (Belgium) Britt Geukens
January 19	Sharm el-Sheikh, Egypt; Hard $10,000; Singles and doubles draws	(Japan) Shiho Akita (Japan) Yuuki Tanaka; 6–2, 7–6^{(7–3)}	(Sweden) Kajsa Rinaldo Persson (Norway) Caroline Rohde-Moe	(United Kingdom) Eden Silva (Greece) Despina Papamichail	(Japan) Shiho Akita (Philippines) Katharina Lehnert (Japan) Yuuki Tanaka (Belgium) Britt Geukens
January 19	Saint Martin, Guadeloupe, France; Hard $10,000; Singles and doubles draws	(United States) Usue Maitane Arconada; 7–5, 3–6, 6–1	(Argentina) Victoria Bosio	(United States) Nicole Frenkel (Brazil) Maria Fernanda Alves	(United States) Alexa Guarachi (Bolivia) María Fernanda Álvarez Terán (Canada) Sonja Molnar (France) Sherazad Reix
January 19	Saint Martin, Guadeloupe, France; Hard $10,000; Singles and doubles draws	(United States) Alexa Guarachi (Japan) Ayaka Okuno; 7–5, 6–3	(United States) Lena Litvak (Canada) Sonja Molnar	(United States) Nicole Frenkel (Brazil) Maria Fernanda Alves	(United States) Alexa Guarachi (Bolivia) María Fernanda Álvarez Terán (Canada) Sonja Molnar (France) Sherazad Reix
January 19	Kaarst, Germany; Carpet (indoor) $10,000; Singles and doubles draws	(Czech Republic) Kateřina Vaňková; 2–6, 6–4, 6–4	(Germany) Tamara Korpatsch	(Slovenia) Dalila Jakupović (Germany) Antonia Lottner	(Germany) Tayisiya Morderger (Bulgaria) Julia Terziyska (Belgium) Sofie Oyen (Germany) Lena Rüffer
January 19	Kaarst, Germany; Carpet (indoor) $10,000; Singles and doubles draws	(Poland) Natalia Siedliska (Netherlands) Mandy Wagemaker; 3–6, 6–4, [10–4]	(Germany) Carolin Daniels (Germany) Nicola Geuer	(Slovenia) Dalila Jakupović (Germany) Antonia Lottner	(Germany) Tayisiya Morderger (Bulgaria) Julia Terziyska (Belgium) Sofie Oyen (Germany) Lena Rüffer
January 19	Aktobe, Kazakhstan; Hard (indoor) $10,000; Singles and doubles draws	(Netherlands) Eva Wacanno; 2–6, 6–4, 6–1	(Russia) Polina Vinogradova	(Russia) Ekaterina Yashina (Uzbekistan) Albina Khabibulina	(Russia) Anastasia Chikalkina (Russia) Alena Tarasova (Russia) Polina Novikova (Russia) Polina Monova
January 19	Aktobe, Kazakhstan; Hard (indoor) $10,000; Singles and doubles draws	(Uzbekistan) Albina Khabibulina (Uzbekistan) Polina Merenkova; 6–4, 6–1	(Kazakhstan) Alexandra Grinchishina (Kazakhstan) Ekaterina Klyueva	(Russia) Ekaterina Yashina (Uzbekistan) Albina Khabibulina	(Russia) Anastasia Chikalkina (Russia) Alena Tarasova (Russia) Polina Novikova (Russia) Polina Monova
January 19	Port El Kantaoui, Tunisia; Hard $10,000; Singles and doubles draws	(Bulgaria) Isabella Shinikova; 6–2, 3–6, 6–3	(Egypt) Sandra Samir	(Italy) Corinna Dentoni (Bulgaria) Dia Evtimova	(France) Myrtille Georges (Serbia) Dejana Radanović (Russia) Yulia Bryzgalova (France) Jennifer Zerbone
January 19	Port El Kantaoui, Tunisia; Hard $10,000; Singles and doubles draws	(France) Estelle Cascino (Bulgaria) Isabella Shinikova; 7–6^{(7–3)}, 6–0	(Czech Republic) Kristýna Hrabalová (Czech Republic) Vendula Žovincová	(Italy) Corinna Dentoni (Bulgaria) Dia Evtimova	(France) Myrtille Georges (Serbia) Dejana Radanović (Russia) Yulia Bryzgalova (France) Jennifer Zerbone
January 19	Antalya, Turkey; Clay $10,000; Singles and doubles draws	(Georgia (country)) Sofia Kvatsabaia; 6–2, 6–3	(France) Alice Bacquié	(Hungary) Vanda Lukács (Italy) Alice Savoretti	(Bulgaria) Petia Arshinkova (Turkey) Melis Sezer (Greece) Eleni Daniilidou (Slovakia) Kristína Schmiedlová
January 19	Antalya, Turkey; Clay $10,000; Singles and doubles draws	(Turkey) Melis Sezer (South Africa) Chanel Simmonds; 6–4, 4–6, [10–4]	(Georgia (country)) Ekaterine Gorgodze (Georgia (country)) Sofia Kvatsabaia	(Hungary) Vanda Lukács (Italy) Alice Savoretti	(Bulgaria) Petia Arshinkova (Turkey) Melis Sezer (Greece) Eleni Daniilidou (Slovakia) Kristína Schmiedlová
January 26	Andrézieux-Bouthéon, France; Hard (indoor) $25,000; Singles and doubles draws	(Russia) Margarita Gasparyan; 6–4, 6–4	(Bulgaria) Elitsa Kostova	(Croatia) Ana Vrljić (France) Amandine Hesse	(Ukraine) Maryna Zanevska (Poland) Paula Kania (France) Stéphanie Foretz (France) Chloé Paquet
January 26	Andrézieux-Bouthéon, France; Hard (indoor) $25,000; Singles and doubles draws	(Italy) Gioia Barbieri (Latvia) Jeļena Ostapenko; 2–6, 7–6^{(7–4)}, [10–3]	(Netherlands) Lesley Kerkhove (Croatia) Ana Vrljić	(Croatia) Ana Vrljić (France) Amandine Hesse	(Ukraine) Maryna Zanevska (Poland) Paula Kania (France) Stéphanie Foretz (France) Chloé Paquet
January 26	Sunrise, United States; Clay $25,000; Singles and doubles draws	(United States) Sachia Vickery; 6–2, 2–6, 6–3	(Spain) Sara Sorribes Tormo	(Russia) Darya Kasatkina (Russia) Natalia Vikhlyantseva	(Turkey) İpek Soylu (Romania) Edina Gallovits-Hall (United States) Maria Sanchez (Spain) Laura Pous Tió
January 26	Sunrise, United States; Clay $25,000; Singles and doubles draws	(Russia) Anna Kalinskaya (United States) Katerina Stewart; 7–6^{(8–6)}, 5–7, [10–6]	(Brazil) Paula Cristina Gonçalves (Brazil) Beatriz Haddad Maia	(Russia) Darya Kasatkina (Russia) Natalia Vikhlyantseva	(Turkey) İpek Soylu (Romania) Edina Gallovits-Hall (United States) Maria Sanchez (Spain) Laura Pous Tió
January 26	Sharm el-Sheikh, Egypt; Hard $10,000; Singles and doubles draws	(Latvia) Anastasija Sevastova; 7–5, 6–3	(Japan) Yuuki Tanaka	(Belgium) Morgane Michiels (Switzerland) Nina Stadler	(Japan) Mami Hasegawa (Russia) Ksenia Gaydarzhi (Norway) Emma Flood (Sweden) Kajsa Rinaldo Persson
January 26	Sharm el-Sheikh, Egypt; Hard $10,000; Singles and doubles draws	(Austria) Melanie Klaffner (Latvia) Anastasija Sevastova; 6–4, 6–4	(Norway) Caroline Rohde-Moe (Japan) Midori Yamamoto	(Belgium) Morgane Michiels (Switzerland) Nina Stadler	(Japan) Mami Hasegawa (Russia) Ksenia Gaydarzhi (Norway) Emma Flood (Sweden) Kajsa Rinaldo Persson
January 26	Petit-Bourg, Guadeloupe, France; Hard $10,000; Singles and doubles draws	(France) Sherazad Reix; 6–1, 6–3	(United States) Nicole Frenkel	(United States) Dasha Ivanova (Canada) Gloria Liang	(United States) Usue Maitaine Arconada (France) Brandy Mina (United States) Alexa Guarachi (Hungary) Fanni Stollár
January 26	Petit-Bourg, Guadeloupe, France; Hard $10,000; Singles and doubles draws	(Canada) Ayan Broomfield (Canada) Marie Leduc; 2–6, 6–4, [10–8]	(Bolivia) María Fernanda Álvarez Terán (Brazil) Laura Pigossi	(United States) Dasha Ivanova (Canada) Gloria Liang	(United States) Usue Maitaine Arconada (France) Brandy Mina (United States) Alexa Guarachi (Hungary) Fanni Stollár
January 26	Aktobe, Kazakhstan; Hard (indoor) $10,000; Singles and doubles draws	(Russia) Marta Paigina; 6–4, 6–0	(Russia) Valeriya Urzhumova	(Russia) Polina Vinogradova (Israel) Keren Shlomo	(Uzbekistan) Albina Khabibulina (Netherlands) Eva Wacanno (Russia) Anastasia Rudakova (Russia) Anastasia Chikalkina
January 26	Aktobe, Kazakhstan; Hard (indoor) $10,000; Singles and doubles draws	(Uzbekistan) Albina Khabibulina (Uzbekistan) Polina Merenkova; 6–2, 7–6^{(8–6)}	(Kyrgyzstan) Ksenia Palkina (Netherlands) Eva Wacanno	(Russia) Polina Vinogradova (Israel) Keren Shlomo	(Uzbekistan) Albina Khabibulina (Netherlands) Eva Wacanno (Russia) Anastasia Rudakova (Russia) Anastasia Chikalkina
January 26	Port El Kantaoui, Tunisia; Hard $10,000; Singles and doubles draws	(Bulgaria) Isabella Shinikova; 6–2, 5–7, 6–1	(Belgium) Marie Benoît	(Japan) Yumi Nakano (Bulgaria) Dia Evtimova	(Italy) Anastasia Grymalska (Bosnia and Herzegovina) Dea Herdželaš (France) Jennifer Zerbone (Italy) Cristiana Ferrando
January 26	Port El Kantaoui, Tunisia; Hard $10,000; Singles and doubles draws	(Bulgaria) Isabella Shinikova (Slovakia) Chantal Škamlová; 6–2, 6–0	(Croatia) Silvia Njirić (Spain) Olga Parres Azcoitia	(Japan) Yumi Nakano (Bulgaria) Dia Evtimova	(Italy) Anastasia Grymalska (Bosnia and Herzegovina) Dea Herdželaš (France) Jennifer Zerbone (Italy) Cristiana Ferrando
January 26	Antalya, Turkey; Clay $10,000; Singles and doubles draws	(Croatia) Iva Mekovec; 6–4, 6–3	(Georgia (country)) Ekaterine Gorgodze	(Bulgaria) Petia Arshinkova (Georgia (country)) Sofia Kvatsabaia	(Slovakia) Lenka Wienerová (Romania) Cristina Dinu (United Kingdom) Amanda Carreras (Turkey) Melis Sezer
January 26	Antalya, Turkey; Clay $10,000; Singles and doubles draws	(Georgia (country)) Ekaterine Gorgodze (Georgia (country)) Sofia Kvatsabaia; 6–2, 6–2	(Poland) Agata Barańska (France) Victoria Muntean	(Bulgaria) Petia Arshinkova (Georgia (country)) Sofia Kvatsabaia	(Slovakia) Lenka Wienerová (Romania) Cristina Dinu (United Kingdom) Amanda Carreras (Turkey) Melis Sezer
January 26	Sunderland, United Kingdom; Hard (indoor) $10,000; Singles and doubles draws	(Republic of Ireland) Amy Bowtell; 6–4, 6–3	(Russia) Marta Sirotkina	(Czech Republic) Martina Borecká (Czech Republic) Jesika Malečková	(Switzerland) Tess Sugnaux (Belgium) Klaartje Liebens (United Kingdom) Lisa Whybourn (Czech Republic) Pernilla Mendesová
January 26	Sunderland, United Kingdom; Hard (indoor) $10,000; Singles and doubles draws	(United Kingdom) Jocelyn Rae (United Kingdom) Anna Smith; 6–3, 6–1	(Poland) Justyna Jegiołka (Sweden) Cornelia Lister	(Czech Republic) Martina Borecká (Czech Republic) Jesika Malečková	(Switzerland) Tess Sugnaux (Belgium) Klaartje Liebens (United Kingdom) Lisa Whybourn (Czech Republic) Pernilla Mendesová

=== February ===
Week of	Tournament	Winner	Runners-up	Semifinalists	Quarterfinalists
February 2	Dow Corning Tennis Classic; Midland, United States; Hard (indoor) $100,000; Singles – Doubles	(Germany) Tatjana Maria; 6–2, 6–0	(United States) Louisa Chirico	(Czech Republic) Kateřina Vaňková (Czech Republic) Nicole Vaidišová	(Japan) Naomi Osaka (United States) Bernarda Pera (United States) Caitlin Whoriskey (United States) Sachia Vickery
February 2	Dow Corning Tennis Classic; Midland, United States; Hard (indoor) $100,000; Singles – Doubles	(France) Julie Coin (United Kingdom) Emily Webley-Smith; 4–6, 7–6^{(7–4)}, [11–9]	(United States) Jacqueline Cako (United States) Sachia Vickery	(Czech Republic) Kateřina Vaňková (Czech Republic) Nicole Vaidišová	(Japan) Naomi Osaka (United States) Bernarda Pera (United States) Caitlin Whoriskey (United States) Sachia Vickery
February 2	McDonald's Burnie International; Burnie, Australia; Hard $50,000; Singles – Doubles	(Russia) Daria Gavrilova; 7–5, 7–5	(United States) Irina Falconi	(Czech Republic) Andrea Hlaváčková (Poland) Katarzyna Piter	(Croatia) Petra Martić (Australia) Alison Bai (Luxembourg) Mandy Minella (China) Han Xinyun
February 2	McDonald's Burnie International; Burnie, Australia; Hard $50,000; Singles – Doubles	(United States) Irina Falconi (Croatia) Petra Martić; 6–2, 6–4	(China) Han Xinyun (Japan) Junri Namigata	(Czech Republic) Andrea Hlaváčková (Poland) Katarzyna Piter	(Croatia) Petra Martić (Australia) Alison Bai (Luxembourg) Mandy Minella (China) Han Xinyun
February 2	Grenoble, France; Hard (indoor) $25,000; Singles and doubles draws	(Poland) Magda Linette; 7–6^{(7–2)}, 4–6, 6–1	(Czech Republic) Tereza Martincová	(France) Manon Arcangioli (Germany) Tamara Korpatsch	(Romania) Irina Maria Bara (Russia) Margarita Gasparyan (Germany) Anna Klasen (Belgium) Klaartje Liebens
February 2	Grenoble, France; Hard (indoor) $25,000; Singles and doubles draws	(Japan) Hiroko Kuwata (Netherlands) Demi Schuurs; 6–1, 6–3	(France) Manon Arcangioli (Netherlands) Cindy Burger	(France) Manon Arcangioli (Germany) Tamara Korpatsch	(Romania) Irina Maria Bara (Russia) Margarita Gasparyan (Germany) Anna Klasen (Belgium) Klaartje Liebens
February 2	Glasgow, United Kingdom; Hard (indoor) $25,000; Singles and doubles draws	(Czech Republic) Kristýna Plíšková; 6–2, 6–2	(Romania) Ana Bogdan	(Germany) Nina Zander (United Kingdom) Naomi Broady	(Netherlands) Lesley Kerkhove (United Kingdom) Katy Dunne (Belgium) Ysaline Bonaventure (France) Stéphanie Foretz
February 2	Glasgow, United Kingdom; Hard (indoor) $25,000; Singles and doubles draws	(Italy) Corinna Dentoni (Italy) Claudia Giovine; 0–6, 6–1, [10–7]	(United Kingdom) Tara Moore (Switzerland) Conny Perrin	(Germany) Nina Zander (United Kingdom) Naomi Broady	(Netherlands) Lesley Kerkhove (United Kingdom) Katy Dunne (Belgium) Ysaline Bonaventure (France) Stéphanie Foretz
February 2	Sharm el-Sheikh, Egypt; Hard $10,000; Singles and doubles draws	(Austria) Melanie Klaffner; 7–5, 3–6, 6–2	(Japan) Yuuki Tanaka	(Ukraine) Veronika Kapshay (Germany) Sarah-Rebecca Sekulic	(Japan) Shiho Akita (Bulgaria) Aleksandrina Naydenova (Romania) Elena-Teodora Cadar (Russia) Polina Leykina
February 2	Sharm el-Sheikh, Egypt; Hard $10,000; Singles and doubles draws	(Russia) Anna Morgina (Japan) Yuuki Tanaka; 4–6, 6–4, [10–6]	(Ukraine) Veronika Kapshay (Austria) Melanie Klaffner	(Ukraine) Veronika Kapshay (Germany) Sarah-Rebecca Sekulic	(Japan) Shiho Akita (Bulgaria) Aleksandrina Naydenova (Romania) Elena-Teodora Cadar (Russia) Polina Leykina
February 2	Port El Kantaoui, Tunisia; Hard $10,000; Singles and doubles draws	(Belgium) Marie Benoît; 6–7^{(6–8)}, 6–3, 6–3	(Spain) Cristina Sánchez Quintanar	(Japan) Yumi Nakano (Bulgaria) Isabella Shinikova	(Italy) Deborah Chiesa (Bosnia and Herzegovina) Dea Herdželaš (Croatia) Silvia Njirić (Italy) Francesca Palmigiano
February 2	Port El Kantaoui, Tunisia; Hard $10,000; Singles and doubles draws	(Italy) Deborah Chiesa (Italy) Beatrice Lombardo; 6–3, 6–2	(India) Sharmada Balu (Japan) Michika Ozeki	(Japan) Yumi Nakano (Bulgaria) Isabella Shinikova	(Italy) Deborah Chiesa (Bosnia and Herzegovina) Dea Herdželaš (Croatia) Silvia Njirić (Italy) Francesca Palmigiano
February 2	Antalya, Turkey; Clay $10,000; Singles and doubles draws	(Germany) Anne Schäfer; 6–2, 6–0	(Georgia (country)) Sofia Kvatsabaia	(Romania) Cristina Dinu (Croatia) Iva Mekovec	(Japan) Miki Miyamura (China) Zhang Ying (Ukraine) Alyona Sotnikova (Hungary) Vanda Lukács
February 2	Antalya, Turkey; Clay $10,000; Singles and doubles draws	(Japan) Miki Miyamura (Japan) Aiko Yoshitomi; 6–1, 7–6^{(7–4)}	(Hungary) Vanda Lukács (Hungary) Rebeka Stolmár	(Romania) Cristina Dinu (Croatia) Iva Mekovec	(Japan) Miki Miyamura (China) Zhang Ying (Ukraine) Alyona Sotnikova (Hungary) Vanda Lukács
February 9	Launceston International; Launceston, Australia; Hard $50,000; Singles – Doubles	(Russia) Daria Gavrilova; 6–1, 6–2	(Croatia) Tereza Mrdeža	(United States) Irina Falconi (Thailand) Varatchaya Wongteanchai	(China) Yang Zhaoxuan (Japan) Junri Namigata (China) Wang Yafan (Japan) Eri Hozumi
February 9	Launceston International; Launceston, Australia; Hard $50,000; Singles – Doubles	(China) Han Xinyun (Japan) Junri Namigata; 6–4, 3–6, [10–6]	(China) Wang Yafan (China) Yang Zhaoxuan	(United States) Irina Falconi (Thailand) Varatchaya Wongteanchai	(China) Yang Zhaoxuan (Japan) Junri Namigata (China) Wang Yafan (Japan) Eri Hozumi
February 9	São Paulo, Brazil; Clay $25,000; Singles and doubles draws	(Spain) Laura Pous Tió; 6–2, 6–2	(Romania) Andreea Mitu	(Russia) Anastasia Pivovarova (Argentina) María Irigoyen	(Brazil) Gabriela Cé (Peru) Bianca Botto (Paraguay) Montserrat González (Ukraine) Valeriya Strakhova
February 9	São Paulo, Brazil; Clay $25,000; Singles and doubles draws	(Montenegro) Danka Kovinić (Romania) Andreea Mitu; 6–2, 7–5	(Argentina) Tatiana Búa (Brazil) Paula Cristina Gonçalves	(Russia) Anastasia Pivovarova (Argentina) María Irigoyen	(Brazil) Gabriela Cé (Peru) Bianca Botto (Paraguay) Montserrat González (Ukraine) Valeriya Strakhova
February 9	Sharm el-Sheikh, Egypt; Hard $10,000; Singles and doubles draws	(Bulgaria) Julia Terziyska; 6–2, 7–5	(Russia) Anastasia Pribylova	(Netherlands) Kelly Versteeg (Slovakia) Tereza Mihalíková	(Japan) Karin Terami (Russia) Anna Morgina (Belgium) Elena Van Der Sypt (Russia) Polina Leykina
February 9	Sharm el-Sheikh, Egypt; Hard $10,000; Singles and doubles draws	(Kazakhstan) Kamila Kerimbayeva (Russia) Aminat Kushkhova; 6–3, 6–1	(Ukraine) Diana Bogoliy (Russia) Polina Leykina	(Netherlands) Kelly Versteeg (Slovakia) Tereza Mihalíková	(Japan) Karin Terami (Russia) Anna Morgina (Belgium) Elena Van Der Sypt (Russia) Polina Leykina
February 9	Trnava, Slovakia; Hard (indoor) $10,000; Singles and doubles draws	(Latvia) Anastasija Sevastova; 6–1, 7–6^{(7–3)}	(Hungary) Réka-Luca Jani	(Czech Republic) Karolína Muchová (Russia) Sofya Zhuk	(Czech Republic) Petra Melounová (Germany) Nora Niedmers (Slovakia) Viktória Kužmová (Czech Republic) Tereza Malíková
February 9	Trnava, Slovakia; Hard (indoor) $10,000; Singles and doubles draws	(Austria) Anna Maria Heil (Latvia) Anastasija Sevastova; 6–4, 6–3	(Slovakia) Michaela Hončová (Slovakia) Lenka Juríková	(Czech Republic) Karolína Muchová (Russia) Sofya Zhuk	(Czech Republic) Petra Melounová (Germany) Nora Niedmers (Slovakia) Viktória Kužmová (Czech Republic) Tereza Malíková
February 9	Palma Nova, Spain; Clay $10,000; Singles and doubles draws	(United Kingdom) Amanda Carreras; 6–4, 7–6^{(7–3)}	(Spain) Olga Sáez Larra	(Italy) Alice Savoretti (Romania) Irina Maria Bara	(Norway) Melanie Stokke (Hungary) Ágnes Bukta (Romania) Ana Bianca Mihăilă (Spain) Lucía Cervera Vázquez
February 9	Palma Nova, Spain; Clay $10,000; Singles and doubles draws	(United Kingdom) Amanda Carreras (Italy) Alice Savoretti; 6–4, 6–1	(Romania) Irina Maria Bara (Hungary) Ágnes Bukta	(Italy) Alice Savoretti (Romania) Irina Maria Bara	(Norway) Melanie Stokke (Hungary) Ágnes Bukta (Romania) Ana Bianca Mihăilă (Spain) Lucía Cervera Vázquez
February 9	Port El Kantaoui, Tunisia; Hard $10,000; Singles and doubles draws	(France) Lou Brouleau; 6–2, 6–2	(Spain) Cristina Sánchez Quintanar	(South Africa) Natasha Fourouclas (Japan) Yumi Nakano	(Bulgaria) Isabella Shinikova (Netherlands) Mandy Wagemaker (Sweden) Brenda Njuki (Italy) Anna Remondina
February 9	Port El Kantaoui, Tunisia; Hard $10,000; Singles and doubles draws	(South Africa) Ilze Hattingh (South Africa) Michelle Sammons; 7–5, 6–3	(Romania) Nicoleta Dascălu (Bulgaria) Julia Stamatova	(South Africa) Natasha Fourouclas (Japan) Yumi Nakano	(Bulgaria) Isabella Shinikova (Netherlands) Mandy Wagemaker (Sweden) Brenda Njuki (Italy) Anna Remondina
February 9	Antalya, Turkey; Clay $10,000; Singles and doubles draws	(Russia) Victoria Kan; 6–3, 6–4	(Germany) Anne Schäfer	(Romania) Diana Buzean (South Africa) Chanel Simmonds	(Hungary) Rebeka Stolmár (Turkey) Melis Sezer (Austria) Marlies Szupper (Japan) Chihiro Nunome
February 9	Antalya, Turkey; Clay $10,000; Singles and doubles draws	(Georgia (country)) Ekaterine Gorgodze (Russia) Victoria Kan; 6–1, 6–0	(Sweden) Cornelia Lister (Ukraine) Alyona Sotnikova	(Romania) Diana Buzean (South Africa) Chanel Simmonds	(Hungary) Rebeka Stolmár (Turkey) Melis Sezer (Austria) Marlies Szupper (Japan) Chihiro Nunome
February 16	ITF Women's Circuit UBS Thurgau; Kreuzlingen, Switzerland; Carpet (indoor) $50,000; Singles – Doubles	(Belarus) Olga Govortsova; 6–2, 6–1	(Slovakia) Rebecca Šramková	(Czech Republic) Kristýna Plíšková (Latvia) Jeļena Ostapenko	(Serbia) Vesna Dolonc (Switzerland) Romina Oprandi (Czech Republic) Andrea Hlaváčková (Russia) Ekaterina Alexandrova
February 16	ITF Women's Circuit UBS Thurgau; Kreuzlingen, Switzerland; Carpet (indoor) $50,000; Singles – Doubles	(Ukraine) Lyudmyla Kichenok (Ukraine) Nadiia Kichenok; 6–3, 6–3	(France) Stéphanie Foretz (France) Irina Ramialison	(Czech Republic) Kristýna Plíšková (Latvia) Jeļena Ostapenko	(Serbia) Vesna Dolonc (Switzerland) Romina Oprandi (Czech Republic) Andrea Hlaváčková (Russia) Ekaterina Alexandrova
February 16	Altenkirchen, Germany; Carpet (indoor) $25,000; Singles and doubles draws	(Germany) Carina Witthöft; 6–3, 6–4	(Germany) Antonia Lottner	(France) Océane Dodin (Germany) Tatjana Maria	(Netherlands) Lesley Kerkhove (Croatia) Ana Vrljić (Czech Republic) Kateřina Vaňková (United Kingdom) Naomi Broady
February 16	Altenkirchen, Germany; Carpet (indoor) $25,000; Singles and doubles draws	(Germany) Antonia Lottner (Croatia) Ana Vrljić; 6–4, 3–6, [11–9]	(Austria) Sandra Klemenschits (Germany) Tatjana Maria	(France) Océane Dodin (Germany) Tatjana Maria	(Netherlands) Lesley Kerkhove (Croatia) Ana Vrljić (Czech Republic) Kateřina Vaňková (United Kingdom) Naomi Broady
February 16	Delhi Open; New Delhi, India; Hard $25,000; Singles – Doubles	(Poland) Magda Linette; 6–1, 6–1	(Slovenia) Tadeja Majerič	(Japan) Riko Sawayanagi (Slovenia) Dalila Jakupović	(Ukraine) Olga Savchuk (United Kingdom) Katy Dunne (China) Yang Zhaoxuan (Romania) Cristina Ene
February 16	Delhi Open; New Delhi, India; Hard $25,000; Singles – Doubles	(China) Tang Haochen (China) Yang Zhaoxuan; 7–5, 6–1	(Chinese Taipei) Hsu Ching-wen (Chinese Taipei) Lee Pei-chi	(Japan) Riko Sawayanagi (Slovenia) Dalila Jakupović	(Ukraine) Olga Savchuk (United Kingdom) Katy Dunne (China) Yang Zhaoxuan (Romania) Cristina Ene
February 16	Cuernavaca, Mexico; Hard $25,000; Singles and doubles draws	(Mexico) Marcela Zacarías; 6–3, 6–2	(Serbia) Nina Stojanović	(Mexico) Victoria Rodríguez (United States) Alexandra Morozova	(Colombia) Mariana Duque (France) Chloé Paquet (Czech Republic) Kateřina Kramperová (Czech Republic) Barbora Štefková
February 16	Cuernavaca, Mexico; Hard $25,000; Singles and doubles draws	(Mexico) Victoria Rodríguez (Mexico) Marcela Zacarías; 6–4, 6–0	(United States) Alexandra Morozova (United States) Daniella Roldan	(Mexico) Victoria Rodríguez (United States) Alexandra Morozova	(Colombia) Mariana Duque (France) Chloé Paquet (Czech Republic) Kateřina Kramperová (Czech Republic) Barbora Štefková
February 16	Moscow, Russia; Hard (indoor) $25,000; Singles and doubles draws	(Russia) Margarita Gasparyan; 6–0, 6–4	(Russia) Karine Sarkisova	(Russia) Veronika Kudermetova (Belarus) Aliaksandra Sasnovich	(Russia) Vitalia Diatchenko (Netherlands) Cindy Burger (Russia) Alena Tarasova (Ukraine) Anastasiya Vasylyeva
February 16	Moscow, Russia; Hard (indoor) $25,000; Singles and doubles draws	(Belarus) Lidziya Marozava (Ukraine) Anastasiya Vasylyeva; 6–4, 6–4	(Russia) Natela Dzalamidze (Russia) Veronika Kudermetova	(Russia) Veronika Kudermetova (Belarus) Aliaksandra Sasnovich	(Russia) Vitalia Diatchenko (Netherlands) Cindy Burger (Russia) Alena Tarasova (Ukraine) Anastasiya Vasylyeva
February 16	Surprise, United States; Hard $25,000; Singles and doubles draws	(Sweden) Sofia Arvidsson; 6–2, 6–1	(United States) Sanaz Marand	(United States) Maria Sanchez (Canada) Françoise Abanda	(United States) Caitlin Whoriskey (United States) CiCi Bellis (United States) Jessica Failla (United States) Lauren Embree
February 16	Surprise, United States; Hard $25,000; Singles and doubles draws	(United States) Jacqueline Cako (United States) Kaitlyn Christian; 6–4, 5–7, [10–7]	(United Kingdom) Johanna Konta (United States) Maria Sanchez	(United States) Maria Sanchez (Canada) Françoise Abanda	(United States) Caitlin Whoriskey (United States) CiCi Bellis (United States) Jessica Failla (United States) Lauren Embree
February 16	Sharm el-Sheikh, Egypt; Hard $10,000; Singles and doubles draws	(Bulgaria) Julia Terziyska; 6–3, 6–2	(Russia) Anastasia Pribylova	(Spain) Nuria Párrizas Díaz (Serbia) Doroteja Erić	(Serbia) Dejana Radanović (Russia) Anna Morgina (Portugal) Inês Murta (Russia) Aminat Kushkhova
February 16	Sharm el-Sheikh, Egypt; Hard $10,000; Singles and doubles draws	(Russia) Anna Morgina (Bulgaria) Julia Terziyska; 6–3, 6–0	(Belarus) Darya Lebesheva (Russia) Anastasia Shaulskaya	(Spain) Nuria Párrizas Díaz (Serbia) Doroteja Erić	(Serbia) Dejana Radanović (Russia) Anna Morgina (Portugal) Inês Murta (Russia) Aminat Kushkhova
February 16	Palma Nova, Spain; Clay $10,000; Singles and doubles draws	(United Kingdom) Amanda Carreras; 7–5, 6–0	(Moldova) Cristina Bucșa	(Italy) Alice Savoretti (Romania) Irina Maria Bara	(Spain) Yvonne Cavallé Reimers (Spain) Inés Ferrer Suárez (Lithuania) Akvilė Paražinskaitė (Spain) Aliona Bolsova Zadoinov
February 16	Palma Nova, Spain; Clay $10,000; Singles and doubles draws	(Romania) Irina Maria Bara (Hungary) Ágnes Bukta; 6–1, 6–1	(Romania) Ana Bianca Mihăilă (Czech Republic) Gabriela Pantůčková	(Italy) Alice Savoretti (Romania) Irina Maria Bara	(Spain) Yvonne Cavallé Reimers (Spain) Inés Ferrer Suárez (Lithuania) Akvilė Paražinskaitė (Spain) Aliona Bolsova Zadoinov
February 16	Port El Kantaoui, Tunisia; Hard $10,000; Singles and doubles draws	(France) Clothilde de Bernardi; 6–4, 6–2	(France) Lou Brouleau	(France) Tessah Andrianjafitrimo (Netherlands) Eva Wacanno	(Russia) Ksenia Lykina (Italy) Angelica Moratelli (Italy) Camilla Scala (South Africa) Ilze Hattingh
February 16	Port El Kantaoui, Tunisia; Hard $10,000; Singles and doubles draws	(France) Tessah Andrianjafitrimo (Russia) Anna Blinkova; 6–4, 6–0	(Spain) Arabela Fernández Rabener (Netherlands) Eva Wacanno	(France) Tessah Andrianjafitrimo (Netherlands) Eva Wacanno	(Russia) Ksenia Lykina (Italy) Angelica Moratelli (Italy) Camilla Scala (South Africa) Ilze Hattingh
February 16	Antalya, Turkey; Clay $10,000; Singles and doubles draws	(Georgia (country)) Sofia Kvatsabaia; 6–4, 7–6^{(8–6)}	(Romania) Diana Buzean	(Russia) Victoria Kan (Ukraine) Alyona Sotnikova	(Georgia (country)) Ekaterine Gorgodze (North Macedonia) Lina Gjorcheska (Turkey) Melis Sezer (Uzbekistan) Arina Folts
February 16	Antalya, Turkey; Clay $10,000; Singles and doubles draws	(Bosnia and Herzegovina) Anita Husarić (Belgium) Kimberley Zimmermann; 6–0, 6–3	(Turkey) Başak Eraydın (Italy) Verena Meliss	(Russia) Victoria Kan (Ukraine) Alyona Sotnikova	(Georgia (country)) Ekaterine Gorgodze (North Macedonia) Lina Gjorcheska (Turkey) Melis Sezer (Uzbekistan) Arina Folts
February 23	Ladies Neva Cup; Saint Petersburg, Russia; Hard (indoor) $50,000; Singles – Doubles	(Latvia) Jeļena Ostapenko; 3–6, 7–5, 6–2	(Romania) Patricia Maria Țig	(Belarus) Aliaksandra Sasnovich (Serbia) Vesna Dolonc	(Serbia) Ivana Jorović (Netherlands) Cindy Burger (Croatia) Ana Vrljić (Russia) Shakhlo Saidova
February 23	Ladies Neva Cup; Saint Petersburg, Russia; Hard (indoor) $50,000; Singles – Doubles	(Switzerland) Viktorija Golubic (Belarus) Aliaksandra Sasnovich; 6–4, 7–5	(France) Stéphanie Foretz (Croatia) Ana Vrljić	(Belarus) Aliaksandra Sasnovich (Serbia) Vesna Dolonc	(Serbia) Ivana Jorović (Netherlands) Cindy Burger (Croatia) Ana Vrljić (Russia) Shakhlo Saidova
February 23	Campinas, Brazil; Clay $25,000; Singles and doubles draws	(Romania) Andreea Mitu; 6–3, 3–6, 6–2	(Australia) Olivia Rogowska	(Brazil) Teliana Pereira (Spain) Lourdes Domínguez Lino	(Greece) Maria Sakkari (Brazil) Paula Cristina Gonçalves (Montenegro) Danka Kovinić (Paraguay) Verónica Cepede Royg
February 23	Campinas, Brazil; Clay $25,000; Singles and doubles draws	(France) Pauline Parmentier (Australia) Olivia Rogowska; 7–5, 4–6, [10–8]	(Venezuela) Andrea Gámiz (Brazil) Paula Cristina Gonçalves	(Brazil) Teliana Pereira (Spain) Lourdes Domínguez Lino	(Greece) Maria Sakkari (Brazil) Paula Cristina Gonçalves (Montenegro) Danka Kovinić (Paraguay) Verónica Cepede Royg
February 23	Aurangabad, India; Clay $25,000; Singles and doubles draws	(Slovenia) Dalila Jakupović; 6–7^{(5–7)}, 6–4, 6–4	(China) Han Xinyun	(Belgium) Marie Benoît (Bulgaria) Aleksandrina Naydenova	(Japan) Riko Sawayanagi (United Kingdom) Harriet Dart (Russia) Valentyna Ivakhnenko (China) Zhang Kailin
February 23	Aurangabad, India; Clay $25,000; Singles and doubles draws	(Chinese Taipei) Lee Ya-hsuan (Thailand) Varatchaya Wongteanchai; 6–1, 7–6^{(7–4)}	(Chinese Taipei) Hsu Ching-wen (Chinese Taipei) Lee Pei-chi	(Belgium) Marie Benoît (Bulgaria) Aleksandrina Naydenova	(Japan) Riko Sawayanagi (United Kingdom) Harriet Dart (Russia) Valentyna Ivakhnenko (China) Zhang Kailin
February 23	Beinasco, Italy; Clay (indoor) $25,000+H; Singles and doubles draws	(Slovakia) Kristína Kučová; 6–4, 7–6^{(7–3)}	(Czech Republic) Barbora Krejčíková	(Italy) Martina Caregaro (Switzerland) Xenia Knoll	(Germany) Tatjana Maria (Italy) Giulia Gatto-Monticone (Russia) Irina Khromacheva (Croatia) Silvia Njirić
February 23	Beinasco, Italy; Clay (indoor) $25,000+H; Singles and doubles draws	(Netherlands) Demi Schuurs (Chile) Daniela Seguel; 6–4, 4–6, [11–9]	(Switzerland) Xenia Knoll (Italy) Alice Matteucci	(Italy) Martina Caregaro (Switzerland) Xenia Knoll	(Germany) Tatjana Maria (Italy) Giulia Gatto-Monticone (Russia) Irina Khromacheva (Croatia) Silvia Njirić
February 23	Rancho Santa Fe, United States; Hard $25,000; Singles and doubles draws	(United States) CiCi Bellis; 6–2, 6–0	(United States) Maria Sanchez	(Turkey) İpek Soylu (United States) Sanaz Marand	(United Kingdom) Johanna Konta (Netherlands) Indy de Vroome (Japan) Mayo Hibi (United States) Bernarda Pera
February 23	Rancho Santa Fe, United States; Hard $25,000; Singles and doubles draws	(United States) Samantha Crawford (United States) Asia Muhammad; 6–0, 6–3	(Turkey) İpek Soylu (Serbia) Nina Stojanović	(Turkey) İpek Soylu (United States) Sanaz Marand	(United Kingdom) Johanna Konta (Netherlands) Indy de Vroome (Japan) Mayo Hibi (United States) Bernarda Pera
February 23	Clare, Australia; Hard $15,000; Singles and doubles draws	(South Korea) Jang Su-jeong; 6–3, 6–3	(Austria) Pia König	(United States) Jennifer Elie (China) Wang Yan	(Australia) Jessica Moore (Japan) Mai Minokoshi (Japan) Mana Ayukawa (South Korea) Han Na-lae
February 23	Clare, Australia; Hard $15,000; Singles and doubles draws	(United States) Jennifer Elie (Australia) Jessica Moore; 6–3, 7–5	(Japan) Mana Ayukawa (Japan) Kotomi Takahata	(United States) Jennifer Elie (China) Wang Yan	(Australia) Jessica Moore (Japan) Mai Minokoshi (Japan) Mana Ayukawa (South Korea) Han Na-lae
February 23	Sharm el-Sheikh, Egypt; Hard $10,000; Singles and doubles draws	(Thailand) Nudnida Luangnam; 6–1, 6–3	(Russia) Aminat Kushkhova	(Bulgaria) Julia Terziyska (China) Sun Xuliu	(Greece) Angeliki Kairi (Turkey) Ayla Aksu (Czech Republic) Marina Hrubá (Romania) Elena-Teodora Cadar
February 23	Sharm el-Sheikh, Egypt; Hard $10,000; Singles and doubles draws	(Russia) Anna Morgina (Bulgaria) Julia Terziyska; 6–1, 4–6, [10–2]	(Turkey) Ayla Aksu (Turkey) Müge Topsel	(Bulgaria) Julia Terziyska (China) Sun Xuliu	(Greece) Angeliki Kairi (Turkey) Ayla Aksu (Czech Republic) Marina Hrubá (Romania) Elena-Teodora Cadar
February 23	Mâcon, France; Hard (indoor) $10,000; Singles and doubles draws	(Belgium) Sofie Oyen; 2–6, 6–3, 7–6^{(7–5)}	(France) Céline Ghesquière	(Ukraine) Olga Fridman (France) Kinnie Laisné	(Germany) Sina Haas (Netherlands) Eva Wacanno (France) Marine Partaud (Germany) Katharina Hobgarski
February 23	Mâcon, France; Hard (indoor) $10,000; Singles and doubles draws	(Bulgaria) Isabella Shinikova (Netherlands) Eva Wacanno; 6–4, 3–6, [10–5]	(France) Kinnie Laisné (France) Marine Partaud	(Ukraine) Olga Fridman (France) Kinnie Laisné	(Germany) Sina Haas (Netherlands) Eva Wacanno (France) Marine Partaud (Germany) Katharina Hobgarski
February 23	Palma Nova, Spain; Clay $10,000; Singles and doubles draws	(Spain) Yvonne Cavallé Reimers; 6–1, 6–2	(France) Joséphine Boualem	(Hungary) Ágnes Bukta (Egypt) Sandra Samir	(Moldova) Cristina Bucșa (Spain) Aliona Bolsova Zadoinov (Italy) Alice Savoretti (Netherlands) Inger van Dijkman
February 23	Palma Nova, Spain; Clay $10,000; Singles and doubles draws	(Romania) Irina Maria Bara (Hungary) Ágnes Bukta; 6–2, 6–4	(Germany) Kim Grajdek (Lithuania) Akvilė Paražinskaitė	(Hungary) Ágnes Bukta (Egypt) Sandra Samir	(Moldova) Cristina Bucșa (Spain) Aliona Bolsova Zadoinov (Italy) Alice Savoretti (Netherlands) Inger van Dijkman
February 23	Port El Kantaoui, Tunisia; Hard $10,000; Singles and doubles draws	(Slovakia) Kristína Schmiedlová; 7–5, 6–2	(Czech Republic) Tereza Malíková	(France) Clothilde de Bernardi (France) Tessah Andrianjafitrimo	(Slovakia) Nikola Vajdová (France) Lou Brouleau (United Kingdom) Francesca Stephenson (Germany) Anna Klasen
February 23	Port El Kantaoui, Tunisia; Hard $10,000; Singles and doubles draws	(Russia) Ksenia Lykina (United Kingdom) Francesca Stephenson; 6–2, 6–2	(Slovakia) Vivien Juhászová (Czech Republic) Tereza Malíková	(France) Clothilde de Bernardi (France) Tessah Andrianjafitrimo	(Slovakia) Nikola Vajdová (France) Lou Brouleau (United Kingdom) Francesca Stephenson (Germany) Anna Klasen
February 23	Antalya, Turkey; Clay $10,000; Singles and doubles draws	(Romania) Diana Buzean; 4–6, 6–4, 6–0	(Turkey) Berfu Cengiz	(Bulgaria) Dia Evtimova (Romania) Cristina Dinu	(Ukraine) Oleksandra Piskun (Turkey) Melis Sezer (Romania) Ioana Loredana Roșca (North Macedonia) Lina Gjorcheska
February 23	Antalya, Turkey; Clay $10,000; Singles and doubles draws	(Turkey) Melis Sezer (Slovakia) Lenka Wienerová; 6–2, 6–2	(Russia) Polina Novoselova (Belarus) Iryna Shymanovich	(Bulgaria) Dia Evtimova (Romania) Cristina Dinu	(Ukraine) Oleksandra Piskun (Turkey) Melis Sezer (Romania) Ioana Loredana Roșca (North Macedonia) Lina Gjorcheska

=== March ===
Week of	Tournament	Winner	Runners-up	Semifinalists	Quarterfinalists
March 2	Curitiba, Brazil; Clay $25,000; Singles and doubles draws	(Spain) Lourdes Domínguez Lino; 4–6, 6–2, 6–3	(Montenegro) Danka Kovinić	(Brazil) Paula Cristina Gonçalves (Liechtenstein) Stephanie Vogt	(Romania) Andreea Mitu (Belgium) Ysaline Bonaventure (Greece) Maria Sakkari (Paraguay) Verónica Cepede Royg
March 2	Curitiba, Brazil; Clay $25,000; Singles and doubles draws	(Belgium) Ysaline Bonaventure (Sweden) Rebecca Peterson; 4–6, 6–3, [10–5]	(Spain) Beatriz García Vidagany (Argentina) Florencia Molinero	(Brazil) Paula Cristina Gonçalves (Liechtenstein) Stephanie Vogt	(Romania) Andreea Mitu (Belgium) Ysaline Bonaventure (Greece) Maria Sakkari (Paraguay) Verónica Cepede Royg
March 2	Port Pirie, Australia; Hard $15,000; Singles and doubles draws	(South Korea) Han Na-lae; 3–6, 6–4, 6–2	(South Korea) Jang Su-jeong	(Poland) Sandra Zaniewska (Japan) Mana Ayukawa	(China) Liu Chang (Australia) Jessica Moore (Japan) Yuuki Tanaka (Australia) Priscilla Hon
March 2	Port Pirie, Australia; Hard $15,000; Singles and doubles draws	(Australia) Jessica Moore (Australia) Abbie Myers; 6–0, 6–3	(China) Liu Chang (China) Tian Ran	(Poland) Sandra Zaniewska (Japan) Mana Ayukawa	(China) Liu Chang (Australia) Jessica Moore (Japan) Yuuki Tanaka (Australia) Priscilla Hon
March 2	Jiangmen, China; Hard $10,000; Singles and doubles draws	(Norway) Emma Flood; 7–6^{(9–7)}, 6–3	(China) Tang Haochen	(Japan) Yurina Koshino (China) Ye Qiuyu	(China) Zhang Yuxuan (United Kingdom) Isabelle Wallace (China) Sheng Yuqi (China) Gao Xinyu
March 2	Jiangmen, China; Hard $10,000; Singles and doubles draws	(Chinese Taipei) Hsu Ching-wen (China) Tang Haochen; 6–4, 6–3	(China) Jiang Xinyu (China) Tang Qianhui	(Japan) Yurina Koshino (China) Ye Qiuyu	(China) Zhang Yuxuan (United Kingdom) Isabelle Wallace (China) Sheng Yuqi (China) Gao Xinyu
March 2	Sharm el-Sheikh, Egypt; Hard $10,000; Singles and doubles draws	(Belarus) Vera Lapko; 7–5, 6–3	(Czech Republic) Markéta Vondroušová	(Norway) Caroline Rohde-Moe (Ukraine) Dayana Yastremska	(Russia) Olga Puchkova (Austria) Melanie Klaffner (Serbia) Vojislava Lukić (Russia) Anna Morgina
March 2	Sharm el-Sheikh, Egypt; Hard $10,000; Singles and doubles draws	(Belarus) Vera Lapko (Czech Republic) Markéta Vondroušová; 6–2, 6–4	(Russia) Anna Morgina (Norway) Caroline Rohde-Moe	(Norway) Caroline Rohde-Moe (Ukraine) Dayana Yastremska	(Russia) Olga Puchkova (Austria) Melanie Klaffner (Serbia) Vojislava Lukić (Russia) Anna Morgina
March 2	Solarino, Italy; Hard $10,000; Singles and doubles draws	(France) Irina Ramialison; 6–1, 6–7^{(6–8)}, 6–4	(Italy) Martina Caregaro	(Italy) Anna Remondina (France) Constance Sibille	(United Kingdom) Eden Silva (Thailand) Helen De Cesare (France) Carla Touly (Austria) Janina Toljan
March 2	Solarino, Italy; Hard $10,000; Singles and doubles draws	(Italy) Deborah Chiesa (Italy) Camilla Rosatello; 7–6^{(7–4)}, 6–3	(Italy) Marta Bellucco (Italy) Camilla Scala	(Italy) Anna Remondina (France) Constance Sibille	(United Kingdom) Eden Silva (Thailand) Helen De Cesare (France) Carla Touly (Austria) Janina Toljan
March 2	Port El Kantaoui, Tunisia; Hard $10,000; Singles and doubles draws	(South Africa) Chanel Simmonds; 2–6, 7–6^{(7–0)}, 6–4	(Spain) Cristina Sánchez Quintanar	(France) Manon Arcangioli (France) Myrtille Georges	(Germany) Laura Schaeder (Belgium) Catherine Chantraine (Belgium) Hélène Scholsen (United States) Jessica Ho
March 2	Port El Kantaoui, Tunisia; Hard $10,000; Singles and doubles draws	(Spain) Cristina Sánchez Quintanar (France) Clara Tanielian; 7–5, 6–7^{(9–11)}, [10–3]	(United States) Jessica Ho (South Africa) Chanel Simmonds	(France) Manon Arcangioli (France) Myrtille Georges	(Germany) Laura Schaeder (Belgium) Catherine Chantraine (Belgium) Hélène Scholsen (United States) Jessica Ho
March 2	Antalya, Turkey; Clay $10,000; Singles and doubles draws	(Romania) Cristina Dinu; 2–6, 6–4, 6–2	(Hungary) Réka-Luca Jani	(United Kingdom) Tara Moore (Italy) Corinna Dentoni	(Belarus) Sviatlana Pirazhenka (Sweden) Cornelia Lister (Bulgaria) Petia Arshinkova (Uzbekistan) Arina Folts
March 2	Antalya, Turkey; Clay $10,000; Singles and doubles draws	(Sweden) Cornelia Lister (United Kingdom) Tara Moore; 7–6^{(7–0)}, 7–5	(Germany) Kim Grajdek (Australia) Alexandra Nancarrow	(United Kingdom) Tara Moore (Italy) Corinna Dentoni	(Belarus) Sviatlana Pirazhenka (Sweden) Cornelia Lister (Bulgaria) Petia Arshinkova (Uzbekistan) Arina Folts
March 9	Mildura, Australia; Grass $15,000; Singles and doubles draws	(Australia) Alison Bai; 6–3, 6–3	(Australia) Kimberly Birrell	(Australia) Zoe Hives (France) Sherazad Reix	(Australia) Abbie Myers (Japan) Nozomi Fujioka (Australia) Jessica Moore (South Korea) Jang Su-jeong
March 9	Mildura, Australia; Grass $15,000; Singles and doubles draws	(Japan) Hiroko Kuwata (Japan) Yuuki Tanaka; 6–2, 6–0	(China) Tian Ran (China) Wang Yan	(Australia) Zoe Hives (France) Sherazad Reix	(Australia) Abbie Myers (Japan) Nozomi Fujioka (Australia) Jessica Moore (South Korea) Jang Su-jeong
March 9	São José dos Campos, Brazil; Clay $10,000; Singles and doubles draws	(Argentina) Nadia Podoroska; 6–7^{(6–8)}, 7–6^{(7–2)}, 6–3	(Argentina) Victoria Bosio	(Hungary) Csilla Argyelán (Argentina) Guadalupe Pérez Rojas	(Argentina) Constanza Vega (Paraguay) Sara Giménez (Brazil) Laura Pigossi (Chile) Fernanda Brito
March 9	São José dos Campos, Brazil; Clay $10,000; Singles and doubles draws	(Brazil) Carolina Alves (Argentina) Victoria Bosio; 7–6^{(7–3)}, 6–4	(Brazil) Gabriela Cé (Brazil) Laura Pigossi	(Hungary) Csilla Argyelán (Argentina) Guadalupe Pérez Rojas	(Argentina) Constanza Vega (Paraguay) Sara Giménez (Brazil) Laura Pigossi (Chile) Fernanda Brito
March 9	Jiangmen, China; Hard $10,000; Singles and doubles draws	(Chinese Taipei) Chang Kai-chen; 6–2, 6–1	(China) Zhao Di	(United Kingdom) Freya Christie (China) Zhang Yuxuan	(China) You Xiaodi (China) Ye Qiuyu (United Kingdom) Isabelle Wallace (China) Zheng Wushuang
March 9	Jiangmen, China; Hard $10,000; Singles and doubles draws	(South Korea) Choi Ji-hee (South Korea) Kim Na-ri; 4–6, 6–2, [11–9]	(Chinese Taipei) Lee Pei-chi (China) Li Yihong	(United Kingdom) Freya Christie (China) Zhang Yuxuan	(China) You Xiaodi (China) Ye Qiuyu (United Kingdom) Isabelle Wallace (China) Zheng Wushuang
March 9	Sharm el-Sheikh, Egypt; Hard $10,000; Singles and doubles draws	(Thailand) Nudnida Luangnam; 6–2, 6–4	(Austria) Melanie Klaffner	(Belarus) Vera Lapko (Japan) Kanami Tsuji	(Russia) Olga Puchkova (Czech Republic) Marina Hrubá (Germany) Luisa Marie Huber (China) Sun Xuliu
March 9	Sharm el-Sheikh, Egypt; Hard $10,000; Singles and doubles draws	(India) Prarthana Thombare (Russia) Ekaterina Yashina; 6–4, 5–7, [10–6]	(Belarus) Anhelina Kalita (Belarus) Vera Lapko	(Belarus) Vera Lapko (Japan) Kanami Tsuji	(Russia) Olga Puchkova (Czech Republic) Marina Hrubá (Germany) Luisa Marie Huber (China) Sun Xuliu
March 9	Amiens, France; Clay (indoor) $10,000; Singles and doubles draws	(Ukraine) Olga Ianchuk; 3–6, 6–3, 6–4	(France) Alizé Lim	(France) Virginie Razzano (Ukraine) Elizaveta Ianchuk	(Russia) Anastasia Rudakova (France) Joséphine Boualem (Netherlands) Mandy Wagemaker (Belgium) Elise Mertens
March 9	Amiens, France; Clay (indoor) $10,000; Singles and doubles draws	(Hungary) Ilka Csöregi (Greece) Eleni Daniilidou; 6–1, 6–4	(Ukraine) Elizaveta Ianchuk (Ukraine) Olga Ianchuk	(France) Virginie Razzano (Ukraine) Elizaveta Ianchuk	(Russia) Anastasia Rudakova (France) Joséphine Boualem (Netherlands) Mandy Wagemaker (Belgium) Elise Mertens
March 9	Solarino, Italy; Hard $10,000; Singles and doubles draws	(Italy) Cristiana Ferrando; 6–3, 6–3	(France) Irina Ramialison	(France) Carla Touly (Hungary) Dalma Gálfi	(Italy) Stefania Rubini (Italy) Camilla Rosatello (Switzerland) Lisa Sabino (Italy) Jessica Pieri
March 9	Solarino, Italy; Hard $10,000; Singles and doubles draws	(Hungary) Anna Bondár (Hungary) Dalma Gálfi; 6–3, 6–2	(Ukraine) Sofiya Kovalets (Austria) Janina Toljan	(France) Carla Touly (Hungary) Dalma Gálfi	(Italy) Stefania Rubini (Italy) Camilla Rosatello (Switzerland) Lisa Sabino (Italy) Jessica Pieri
March 9	Port El Kantaoui, Tunisia; Hard $10,000; Singles and doubles draws	(France) Clothilde de Bernardi; 6–4, 6–3	(Spain) Cristina Sánchez Quintanar	(France) Margot Decker (France) Myrtille Georges	(France) Manon Arcangioli (Belgium) Magali Kempen (South Africa) Chanel Simmonds (Romania) Mihaela Buzărnescu
March 9	Port El Kantaoui, Tunisia; Hard $10,000; Singles and doubles draws	(France) Myrtille Georges (Bulgaria) Isabella Shinikova; 1–6, 6–4, [10–2]	(Belgium) Magali Kempen (South Africa) Chanel Simmonds	(France) Margot Decker (France) Myrtille Georges	(France) Manon Arcangioli (Belgium) Magali Kempen (South Africa) Chanel Simmonds (Romania) Mihaela Buzărnescu
March 9	Antalya, Turkey; Clay $10,000; Singles and doubles draws	(Russia) Victoria Kan; 6–1, 6–0	(Germany) Anne Schäfer	(Spain) Miriam Civera Lima (Bulgaria) Dia Evtimova	(Germany) Hanna Landener (Australia) Alexandra Nancarrow (Italy) Corinna Dentoni (Belarus) Sviatlana Pirazhenka
March 9	Antalya, Turkey; Clay $10,000; Singles and doubles draws	(Sweden) Cornelia Lister (Belarus) Sviatlana Pirazhenka; 7–6^{(8–6)}, 6–4	(Germany) Kim Grajdek (Slovakia) Lenka Juríková	(Spain) Miriam Civera Lima (Bulgaria) Dia Evtimova	(Germany) Hanna Landener (Australia) Alexandra Nancarrow (Italy) Corinna Dentoni (Belarus) Sviatlana Pirazhenka
March 9	Gainesville, United States; Clay $10,000; Singles and doubles draws	(United States) Katerina Stewart; 6–4, 4–6, 6–4	(United States) Sofia Kenin	(Czech Republic) Kateřina Kramperová (United States) Kaitlyn McCarthy	(United States) Ingrid Neel (Belgium) Sofie Oyen (United States) Alexa Graham (United States) Ellie Halbauer
March 9	Gainesville, United States; Clay $10,000; Singles and doubles draws	(United States) Ingrid Neel (Hungary) Fanni Stollár; 6–3, 6–3	(United States) Sofia Kenin (United States) Marie Norris	(Czech Republic) Kateřina Kramperová (United States) Kaitlyn McCarthy	(United States) Ingrid Neel (Belgium) Sofie Oyen (United States) Alexa Graham (United States) Ellie Halbauer
March 16	Irapuato, Mexico; Hard $25,000; Singles and doubles draws	(United States) Alexa Glatch; 6–2, 7–5	(Czech Republic) Renata Voráčová	(United States) Maria Sanchez (Romania) Patricia Maria Țig	(Germany) Tatjana Maria (Argentina) María Irigoyen (Netherlands) Arantxa Rus (Colombia) Mariana Duque
March 16	Irapuato, Mexico; Hard $25,000; Singles and doubles draws	(Mexico) Victoria Rodríguez (Mexico) Marcela Zacarías; 6–1, 7–5	(Japan) Ayaka Okuno (Mexico) Ana Sofía Sánchez	(United States) Maria Sanchez (Romania) Patricia Maria Țig	(Germany) Tatjana Maria (Argentina) María Irigoyen (Netherlands) Arantxa Rus (Colombia) Mariana Duque
March 16	Seville, Spain; Clay $25,000; Singles and doubles draws	(Belarus) Olga Govortsova; 7–5, 6–2	(Ukraine) Maryna Zanevska	(Estonia) Anett Kontaveit (Netherlands) Richèl Hogenkamp	(Venezuela) Andrea Gámiz (Croatia) Tereza Mrdeža (Russia) Marina Melnikova (Italy) Giulia Gatto-Monticone
March 16	Seville, Spain; Clay $25,000; Singles and doubles draws	(Georgia (country)) Ekaterine Gorgodze (Russia) Victoria Kan; 6–3, 6–2	(Austria) Sandra Klemenschits (Germany) Dinah Pfizenmaier	(Estonia) Anett Kontaveit (Netherlands) Richèl Hogenkamp	(Venezuela) Andrea Gámiz (Croatia) Tereza Mrdeža (Russia) Marina Melnikova (Italy) Giulia Gatto-Monticone
March 16	Ribeirão Preto, Brazil; Clay $10,000; Singles and doubles draws	(Ukraine) Valeriya Strakhova; 4–6, 7–5, 6–3	(Chile) Fernanda Brito	(Argentina) Nadia Podoroska (Brazil) Laura Pigossi	(Chile) Ivania Martinich (Poland) Katarzyna Kawa (Argentina) Guadalupe Pérez Rojas (Argentina) Carla Lucero
March 16	Ribeirão Preto, Brazil; Clay $10,000; Singles and doubles draws	(Brazil) Ingrid Gamarra Martins (Ukraine) Valeriya Strakhova; 6–0, 6–3	(Argentina) Melina Ferrero (Argentina) Carla Lucero	(Argentina) Nadia Podoroska (Brazil) Laura Pigossi	(Chile) Ivania Martinich (Poland) Katarzyna Kawa (Argentina) Guadalupe Pérez Rojas (Argentina) Carla Lucero
March 16	Jiangmen, China; Hard $10,000; Singles and doubles draws	(China) Liu Chang; 6–3, 6–0	(United Kingdom) Harriet Dart	(South Korea) Kim Na-ri (China) Xu Shilin	(Chinese Taipei) Chan Chin-wei (China) Zhu Aiwen (China) Zhao Di (United Kingdom) Freya Christie
March 16	Jiangmen, China; Hard $10,000; Singles and doubles draws	(China) You Xiaodi (China) Zhu Aiwen; 4–6, 7–5, [10–4]	(China) Xin Yuan (China) Ye Qiuyu	(South Korea) Kim Na-ri (China) Xu Shilin	(Chinese Taipei) Chan Chin-wei (China) Zhu Aiwen (China) Zhao Di (United Kingdom) Freya Christie
March 16	Sharm el-Sheikh, Egypt; Hard $10,000; Singles and doubles draws	(United Kingdom) Katie Swan; 6–2, 6–2	(Bulgaria) Julia Terziyska	(Russia) Aminat Kushkhova (Belarus) Vera Lapko	(Czech Republic) Marina Hrubá (Russia) Ekaterina Yashina (India) Snehadevi Reddy (Austria) Lisa-Maria Moser
March 16	Sharm el-Sheikh, Egypt; Hard $10,000; Singles and doubles draws	(Egypt) Ola Abou Zekry (Ukraine) Kateryna Sliusar; 6–2, 6–4	(United Kingdom) Aimee Gibson (United Kingdom) Katie Swan	(Russia) Aminat Kushkhova (Belarus) Vera Lapko	(Czech Republic) Marina Hrubá (Russia) Ekaterina Yashina (India) Snehadevi Reddy (Austria) Lisa-Maria Moser
March 16	Gonesse, France; Clay (indoor) $10,000; Singles and doubles draws	(Ukraine) Olga Ianchuk; 3–6, 7–5, 6–3	(Slovakia) Michaela Hončová	(Croatia) Iva Mekovec (Ukraine) Elizaveta Ianchuk	(Croatia) Silvia Njirić (France) Léa Tholey (Hungary) Ágnes Bukta (France) Marine Partaud
March 16	Gonesse, France; Clay (indoor) $10,000; Singles and doubles draws	(Hungary) Ágnes Bukta (Romania) Oana Georgeta Simion; 6–4, 3–6, [10–6]	(Ukraine) Elizaveta Ianchuk (Ukraine) Olga Ianchuk	(Croatia) Iva Mekovec (Ukraine) Elizaveta Ianchuk	(Croatia) Silvia Njirić (France) Léa Tholey (Hungary) Ágnes Bukta (France) Marine Partaud
March 16	Solarino, Italy; Hard $10,000; Singles and doubles draws	(Hungary) Dalma Gálfi; 6–4, 7–6^{(7–0)}	(Canada) Gloria Liang	(Italy) Federica Bilardo (Israel) Deniz Khazaniuk	(Georgia (country)) Sofia Shapatava (United Kingdom) Eden Silva (Italy) Cristiana Ferrando (France) Irina Ramialison
March 16	Solarino, Italy; Hard $10,000; Singles and doubles draws	(Germany) Laura Schaeder (Netherlands) Janneke Wikkerink; 6–4, 2–6, [10–7]	(Russia) Olga Doroshina (Georgia (country)) Sofia Shapatava	(Italy) Federica Bilardo (Israel) Deniz Khazaniuk	(Georgia (country)) Sofia Shapatava (United Kingdom) Eden Silva (Italy) Cristiana Ferrando (France) Irina Ramialison
March 16	Kōfu, Japan; Hard $10,000; Singles and doubles draws	(Japan) Miki Miyamura; 6–4, 6–2	(Japan) Aiko Yoshitomi	(Japan) Chiaki Okadaue (Japan) Makoto Ninomiya	(Japan) Shiho Akita (Japan) Risa Ushijima (Japan) Kanae Hisami (Japan) Kyōka Okamura
March 16	Kōfu, Japan; Hard $10,000; Singles and doubles draws	(Japan) Haruka Kaji (Japan) Aiko Yoshitomi; 6–2, 6–3	(Japan) Rika Fujiwara (Japan) Akari Inoue	(Japan) Chiaki Okadaue (Japan) Makoto Ninomiya	(Japan) Shiho Akita (Japan) Risa Ushijima (Japan) Kanae Hisami (Japan) Kyōka Okamura
March 16	Oslo, Norway; Hard (indoor) $10,000; Singles and doubles draws	(Turkey) Pemra Özgen; 2–6, 6–3, 7–6^{(7–5)}	(Poland) Justyna Jegiołka	(Croatia) Jana Fett (Norway) Melanie Stokke	(Slovakia) Zuzana Luknárová (Russia) Maria Marfutina (Croatia) Adrijana Lekaj (Czech Republic) Pernilla Mendesová
March 16	Oslo, Norway; Hard (indoor) $10,000; Singles and doubles draws	(Poland) Justyna Jegiołka (Netherlands) Eva Wacanno; 6–1, 6–1	(Croatia) Jana Fett (Croatia) Adrijana Lekaj	(Croatia) Jana Fett (Norway) Melanie Stokke	(Slovakia) Zuzana Luknárová (Russia) Maria Marfutina (Croatia) Adrijana Lekaj (Czech Republic) Pernilla Mendesová
March 16	Port El Kantaoui, Tunisia; Hard $10,000; Singles and doubles draws	(France) Myrtille Georges; 6–4, 6–0	(Bulgaria) Isabella Shinikova	(South Africa) Natasha Fourouclas (Russia) Evgeniya Levashova	(Spain) Cristina Sánchez Quintanar (Romania) Diana Buzean (Belgium) Marie Benoît (Romania) Mihaela Buzărnescu
March 16	Port El Kantaoui, Tunisia; Hard $10,000; Singles and doubles draws	(Belgium) Britt Geukens (Netherlands) Inger van Dijkman; 6–2, 6–0	(Romania) Diana Buzean (Romania) Raluca Ciufrila	(South Africa) Natasha Fourouclas (Russia) Evgeniya Levashova	(Spain) Cristina Sánchez Quintanar (Romania) Diana Buzean (Belgium) Marie Benoît (Romania) Mihaela Buzărnescu
March 16	Antalya, Turkey; Hard $10,000; Singles and doubles draws	(Ukraine) Alyona Sotnikova; 6–3, 6–3	(Austria) Barbara Haas	(Czech Republic) Tereza Martincová (Serbia) Doroteja Erić	(Australia) Alexandra Nancarrow (Romania) Ioana Loredana Roșca (Germany) Anna Klasen (Belarus) Aryna Sabalenka
March 16	Antalya, Turkey; Hard $10,000; Singles and doubles draws	(Romania) Cristina Ene (Romania) Ioana Loredana Roșca; 6–2, 6–3	(Kazakhstan) Kamila Kerimbayeva (Ukraine) Alyona Sotnikova	(Czech Republic) Tereza Martincová (Serbia) Doroteja Erić	(Australia) Alexandra Nancarrow (Romania) Ioana Loredana Roșca (Germany) Anna Klasen (Belarus) Aryna Sabalenka
March 16	Orlando, United States; Clay $10,000; Singles and doubles draws	(United States) Claire Liu; 6–1, 6–3	(Hungary) Fanni Stollár	(Russia) Irina Khromacheva (United States) Raveena Kingsley	(United States) Kylie McKenzie (Canada) Ayan Broomfield (United States) Rianna Valdes (United States) Katerina Stewart
March 16	Orlando, United States; Clay $10,000; Singles and doubles draws	(United States) Ingrid Neel (Hungary) Fanni Stollár; 6–3, 7–6^{(7–4)}	(Czech Republic) Kateřina Kramperová (United States) Katerina Stewart	(Russia) Irina Khromacheva (United States) Raveena Kingsley	(United States) Kylie McKenzie (Canada) Ayan Broomfield (United States) Rianna Valdes (United States) Katerina Stewart
March 23	Blossom Cup; Quanzhou, China; Hard $50,000; Singles – Doubles	(Russia) Elizaveta Kulichkova; 6–1, 5–7, 7–5	(Latvia) Jeļena Ostapenko	(China) Liu Fangzhou (Poland) Magda Linette	(China) Yang Zhaoxuan (Japan) Eri Hozumi (China) Zhang Kailin (Hong Kong) Zhang Ling
March 23	Blossom Cup; Quanzhou, China; Hard $50,000; Singles – Doubles	(Japan) Eri Hozumi (Japan) Makoto Ninomiya; 6–3, 6–7^{(2–7)}, [10–2]	(Japan) Hiroko Kuwata (Japan) Junri Namigata	(China) Liu Fangzhou (Poland) Magda Linette	(China) Yang Zhaoxuan (Japan) Eri Hozumi (China) Zhang Kailin (Hong Kong) Zhang Ling
March 23	Palm Harbor, United States; Clay $25,000; Singles and doubles draws	(United States) Katerina Stewart; 1–6, 6–3, 2–0, ret.	(Ukraine) Maryna Zanevska	(Argentina) María Irigoyen (United States) Allie Kiick	(Sweden) Rebecca Peterson (Russia) Darya Kasatkina (Brazil) Beatriz Haddad Maia (United States) Alexa Glatch
March 23	Palm Harbor, United States; Clay $25,000; Singles and doubles draws	(Brazil) Paula Cristina Gonçalves (Czech Republic) Petra Krejsová; 6–2, 6–4	(Argentina) María Irigoyen (Argentina) Paula Ormaechea	(Argentina) María Irigoyen (United States) Allie Kiick	(Sweden) Rebecca Peterson (Russia) Darya Kasatkina (Brazil) Beatriz Haddad Maia (United States) Alexa Glatch
March 23	Mornington, Australia; Clay $15,000; Singles and doubles draws	(Australia) Priscilla Hon; 5–7, 6–3, 7–6^{(7–4)}	(Poland) Sandra Zaniewska	(Japan) Ayaka Okuno (Australia) Karolina Wlodarczak	(Australia) Zoe Hives (Japan) Chiaki Okadaue (United States) Jennifer Elie (Australia) Alison Bai
March 23	Mornington, Australia; Clay $15,000; Singles and doubles draws	(Australia) Priscilla Hon (Australia) Tammi Patterson; 6–4, 7–6^{(7–4)}	(Japan) Mana Ayukawa (Japan) Ayaka Okuno	(Japan) Ayaka Okuno (Australia) Karolina Wlodarczak	(Australia) Zoe Hives (Japan) Chiaki Okadaue (United States) Jennifer Elie (Australia) Alison Bai
March 23	Bangkok, Thailand; Hard $15,000; Singles and doubles draws	(South Korea) Jang Su-jeong; 6–2, 6–4	(Japan) Miyabi Inoue	(Japan) Nao Hibino (Czech Republic) Barbora Štefková	(Slovakia) Zuzana Zlochová (Japan) Akiko Omae (Uzbekistan) Sabina Sharipova (Germany) Antonia Lottner
March 23	Bangkok, Thailand; Hard $15,000; Singles and doubles draws	(South Korea) Jang Su-jeong (Serbia) Vojislava Lukić; 6–4, 6–4	(South Africa) Chanel Simmonds (United Kingdom) Emily Webley-Smith	(Japan) Nao Hibino (Czech Republic) Barbora Štefková	(Slovakia) Zuzana Zlochová (Japan) Akiko Omae (Uzbekistan) Sabina Sharipova (Germany) Antonia Lottner
March 23	São José do Rio Preto, Brazil; Clay $10,000; Singles and doubles draws	(Poland) Katarzyna Kawa; 7–5, 3–6, 6–4	(Argentina) Nadia Podoroska	(Argentina) Victoria Bosio (Brazil) Carolina Alves	(Argentina) Carla Lucero (Brazil) Nathaly Kurata (Argentina) Guadalupe Pérez Rojas (Brazil) Laura Pigossi
March 23	São José do Rio Preto, Brazil; Clay $10,000; Singles and doubles draws	(Argentina) Ana Victoria Gobbi Monllau (Argentina) Constanza Vega; 6–3, 3–6, [11–9]	(Argentina) Guadalupe Pérez Rojas (Argentina) Nadia Podoroska	(Argentina) Victoria Bosio (Brazil) Carolina Alves	(Argentina) Carla Lucero (Brazil) Nathaly Kurata (Argentina) Guadalupe Pérez Rojas (Brazil) Laura Pigossi
March 23	Sharm el-Sheikh, Egypt; Hard $10,000; Singles and doubles draws	(Russia) Aminat Kushkhova; 6–3, 6–0	(Bulgaria) Julia Terziyska	(Georgia (country)) Mariam Bolkvadze (Russia) Anna Morgina	(Ukraine) Veronika Kapshay (Sweden) Brenda Njuki (Russia) Alina Mikheeva (Russia) Margarita Lazareva
March 23	Sharm el-Sheikh, Egypt; Hard $10,000; Singles and doubles draws	(Spain) Arabela Fernández Rabener (North Macedonia) Lina Gjorcheska; 6–3, 7–6^{(7–4)}	(Russia) Anna Morgina (Bulgaria) Julia Terziyska	(Georgia (country)) Mariam Bolkvadze (Russia) Anna Morgina	(Ukraine) Veronika Kapshay (Sweden) Brenda Njuki (Russia) Alina Mikheeva (Russia) Margarita Lazareva
March 23	Le Havre, France; Clay (indoor) $10,000; Singles and doubles draws	(Italy) Alice Matteucci; 4–6, 6–4, 7–6^{(7–3)}	(Netherlands) Cindy Burger	(Belgium) Elise Mertens (Germany) Tayisiya Morderger	(Russia) Anastasia Rudakova (Georgia (country)) Ekaterine Gorgodze (Russia) Polina Leykina (Belgium) Elyne Boeykens
March 23	Le Havre, France; Clay (indoor) $10,000; Singles and doubles draws	(Netherlands) Erika Vogelsang (Netherlands) Mandy Wagemaker; 6–1, 1–6, [10–6]	(Italy) Alice Matteucci (Italy) Martina Trevisan	(Belgium) Elise Mertens (Germany) Tayisiya Morderger	(Russia) Anastasia Rudakova (Georgia (country)) Ekaterine Gorgodze (Russia) Polina Leykina (Belgium) Elyne Boeykens
March 23	Heraklion, Greece; Hard $10,000; Singles and doubles draws	(Greece) Maria Sakkari; 6–4, 6–3	(Russia) Anastasiya Komardina	(Greece) Valentini Grammatikopoulou (Slovakia) Viktória Kužmová	(Serbia) Milana Špremo (Serbia) Tamara Čurović (Moldova) Daniela Ciobanu (Czech Republic) Kristýna Hrabalová
March 23	Heraklion, Greece; Hard $10,000; Singles and doubles draws	(Greece) Valentini Grammatikopoulou (Russia) Anastasiya Komardina; 7–5, 6–2	(Slovakia) Viktória Kužmová (Czech Republic) Petra Rohanová	(Greece) Valentini Grammatikopoulou (Slovakia) Viktória Kužmová	(Serbia) Milana Špremo (Serbia) Tamara Čurović (Moldova) Daniela Ciobanu (Czech Republic) Kristýna Hrabalová
March 23	Solarino, Italy; Hard $10,000; Singles and doubles draws	(Italy) Gioia Barbieri; 7–6^{(7–5)}, 6–0	(Italy) Federica Bilardo	(Hungary) Anna Bondár (Slovakia) Natália Vajdová	(Switzerland) Lisa Sabino (Italy) Corinna Dentoni (Italy) Federica Arcidiacono (Germany) Laura Schaeder
March 23	Solarino, Italy; Hard $10,000; Singles and doubles draws	(Italy) Francesca Palmigiano (Switzerland) Lisa Sabino; 6–3, 4–6, [10–3]	(Hungary) Anna Bondár (Russia) Olga Doroshina	(Hungary) Anna Bondár (Slovakia) Natália Vajdová	(Switzerland) Lisa Sabino (Italy) Corinna Dentoni (Italy) Federica Arcidiacono (Germany) Laura Schaeder
March 23	Nishitama, Japan; Hard $10,000; Singles and doubles draws	(Chinese Taipei) Hsu Ching-wen; 6–3, 3–6, 6–4	(Japan) Kyōka Okamura	(Japan) Akari Inoue (Japan) Natsumi Kujime	(Japan) Miki Miyamura (Japan) Shiho Akita (Japan) Machika Miyaji (Japan) Kotomi Takahata
March 23	Nishitama, Japan; Hard $10,000; Singles and doubles draws	(Japan) Kyōka Okamura (Japan) Akiko Yonemura; 2–6, 6–2, [10–5]	(Japan) Kanae Hisami (Japan) Kotomi Takahata	(Japan) Akari Inoue (Japan) Natsumi Kujime	(Japan) Miki Miyamura (Japan) Shiho Akita (Japan) Machika Miyaji (Japan) Kotomi Takahata
March 23	Metepec, Mexico; Hard $10,000; Singles and doubles draws	(Mexico) Marcela Zacarías; 6–4, 7–5	(Brazil) Maria Fernanda Alves	(Bulgaria) Aleksandrina Naydenova (France) Victoria Muntean	(United States) Nadja Gilchrist (France) Brandy Mina (Dominican Republic) Francesca Segarelli (Mexico) Victoria Rodríguez
March 23	Metepec, Mexico; Hard $10,000; Singles and doubles draws	(Brazil) Maria Fernanda Alves (United States) Kaitlyn Christian; 2–6, 6–1, [15–13]	(Mexico) Victoria Rodríguez (Mexico) Marcela Zacarías	(Bulgaria) Aleksandrina Naydenova (France) Victoria Muntean	(United States) Nadja Gilchrist (France) Brandy Mina (Dominican Republic) Francesca Segarelli (Mexico) Victoria Rodríguez
March 23	Port El Kantaoui, Tunisia; Hard $10,000; Singles and doubles draws	(Norway) Melanie Stokke; 2–6, 6–2, 6–3	(France) Lou Brouleau	(Poland) Justyna Jegiołka (Belgium) Marie Benoît	(Bulgaria) Isabella Shinikova (Italy) Alice Balducci (Romania) Diana Buzean (Czech Republic) Nina Holanová
March 23	Port El Kantaoui, Tunisia; Hard $10,000; Singles and doubles draws	(Germany) Carolin Daniels (Poland) Justyna Jegiołka; 7–5, 5–7, [10–5]	(Oman) Fatma Al-Nabhani (Bulgaria) Isabella Shinikova	(Poland) Justyna Jegiołka (Belgium) Marie Benoît	(Bulgaria) Isabella Shinikova (Italy) Alice Balducci (Romania) Diana Buzean (Czech Republic) Nina Holanová
March 23	Antalya, Turkey; Hard $10,000; Singles and doubles draws	(France) Caroline Roméo; 6–3, 7–5	(Romania) Ioana Loredana Roșca	(Romania) Cristina Ene (Turkey) Ayla Aksu	(Belarus) Aryna Sabalenka (Germany) Anna Klasen (Ukraine) Alyona Sotnikova (Serbia) Doroteja Erić
March 23	Antalya, Turkey; Hard $10,000; Singles and doubles draws	(Turkey) Ayla Aksu (Turkey) Melis Sezer; 6–2, 6–4	(Belgium) Dorien Cuypers (Venezuela) Aymet Uzcátegui	(Romania) Cristina Ene (Turkey) Ayla Aksu	(Belarus) Aryna Sabalenka (Germany) Anna Klasen (Ukraine) Alyona Sotnikova (Serbia) Doroteja Erić
March 30	Open GDF Suez Seine-et-Marne; Croissy-Beaubourg, France; Hard (indoor) $50,000; Singles – Doubles	(Russia) Margarita Gasparyan; 6–3, 6–4	(France) Mathilde Johansson	(Ukraine) Yuliya Beygelzimer (Belarus) Olga Govortsova	(France) Virginie Razzano (France) Myrtille Georges (Czech Republic) Kristýna Plíšková (Poland) Magda Linette
March 30	Open GDF Suez Seine-et-Marne; Croissy-Beaubourg, France; Hard (indoor) $50,000; Singles – Doubles	(United Kingdom) Jocelyn Rae (United Kingdom) Anna Smith; 7–6^{(7–5)}, 7–6^{(7–2)}	(France) Julie Coin (France) Mathilde Johansson	(Ukraine) Yuliya Beygelzimer (Belarus) Olga Govortsova	(France) Virginie Razzano (France) Myrtille Georges (Czech Republic) Kristýna Plíšková (Poland) Magda Linette
March 30	Wilde Lexus Women's USTA Pro Circuit Event; Osprey, United States; Clay $50,000; Singles – Doubles	(United States) Alexa Glatch; 6–2, 6–7^{(6–8)}, 6–3	(United States) Madison Brengle	(Ukraine) Anhelina Kalinina (Russia) Evgeniya Rodina	(United States) Louisa Chirico (United States) Shelby Rogers (Turkey) İpek Soylu (Germany) Laura Siegemund
March 30	Wilde Lexus Women's USTA Pro Circuit Event; Osprey, United States; Clay $50,000; Singles – Doubles	(Ukraine) Anhelina Kalinina (Ukraine) Oleksandra Korashvili; 6–1, 6–4	(Paraguay) Verónica Cepede Royg (Argentina) María Irigoyen	(Ukraine) Anhelina Kalinina (Russia) Evgeniya Rodina	(United States) Louisa Chirico (United States) Shelby Rogers (Turkey) İpek Soylu (Germany) Laura Siegemund
March 30	Melbourne, Australia; Clay $15,000; Singles and doubles draws	(Australia) Zoe Hives; 7–5, 6–2	(Australia) Sally Peers	(Australia) Jaimee Fourlis (France) Sherazad Reix	(Australia) Priscilla Hon (Australia) Kimberly Birrell (Australia) Alison Bai (Australia) Destanee Aiava
March 30	Melbourne, Australia; Clay $15,000; Singles and doubles draws	(Australia) Priscilla Hon (Australia) Tammi Patterson; 2–6, 6–4, [12–10]	(Poland) Agata Barańska (Poland) Sandra Zaniewska	(Australia) Jaimee Fourlis (France) Sherazad Reix	(Australia) Priscilla Hon (Australia) Kimberly Birrell (Australia) Alison Bai (Australia) Destanee Aiava
March 30	Bangkok, Thailand; Hard $15,000; Singles and doubles draws	(South Africa) Chanel Simmonds; 7–6^{(7–4)}, 6–3	(Japan) Miyabi Inoue	(Hong Kong) Zhang Ling (Thailand) Varatchaya Wongteanchai	(Japan) Erika Sema (United Kingdom) Emily Webley-Smith (Czech Republic) Kateřina Vaňková (Japan) Nao Hibino
March 30	Bangkok, Thailand; Hard $15,000; Singles and doubles draws	(Japan) Nao Hibino (Japan) Miyu Kato; 6–4, 6–2	(Japan) Miyabi Inoue (Japan) Akiko Omae	(Hong Kong) Zhang Ling (Thailand) Varatchaya Wongteanchai	(Japan) Erika Sema (United Kingdom) Emily Webley-Smith (Czech Republic) Kateřina Vaňková (Japan) Nao Hibino
March 30	Manama, Bahrain; Hard $10,000; Singles and doubles draws	(Oman) Fatma Al-Nabhani; 6–4, 7–6^{(7–2)}	(Germany) Vivian Heisen	(Germany) Jasmin Jebawy (United Kingdom) Laura Deigman	(Germany) Katharina Hering (United States) Tina Tehrani (Mexico) Camila Fuentes (Belarus) Sadafmoh Tolibova
March 30	Manama, Bahrain; Hard $10,000; Singles and doubles draws	(Oman) Fatma Al-Nabhani (Mexico) Camila Fuentes; 6–2, 7–6^{(7–3)}	(Greece) Stamatia Fafaliou (Germany) Jasmin Jebawy	(Germany) Jasmin Jebawy (United Kingdom) Laura Deigman	(Germany) Katharina Hering (United States) Tina Tehrani (Mexico) Camila Fuentes (Belarus) Sadafmoh Tolibova
March 30	Sharm el-Sheikh, Egypt; Hard $10,000; Singles and doubles draws	(Georgia (country)) Mariam Bolkvadze; 6–1, 6–4	(North Macedonia) Lina Gjorcheska	(Russia) Ekaterina Yashina (Bulgaria) Julia Terziyska	(Russia) Margarita Lazareva (Spain) Arabela Fernández Rabener (Russia) Yulia Bryzgalova (Croatia) Adrijana Lekaj
March 30	Sharm el-Sheikh, Egypt; Hard $10,000; Singles and doubles draws	(North Macedonia) Lina Gjorcheska (Bulgaria) Julia Terziyska; 6–0, 6–0	(Poland) Wiktoria Kulik (Poland) Karolina Silwanowicz	(Russia) Ekaterina Yashina (Bulgaria) Julia Terziyska	(Russia) Margarita Lazareva (Spain) Arabela Fernández Rabener (Russia) Yulia Bryzgalova (Croatia) Adrijana Lekaj
March 30	Heraklion, Greece; Hard $10,000; Singles and doubles draws	(Greece) Maria Sakkari; 6–2, 6–2	(Greece) Valentini Grammatikopoulou	(Germany) Anna Zaja (Slovakia) Viktória Kužmová	(Israel) Saray Sterenbach (Serbia) Barbara Bonić (Bulgaria) Vivian Zlatanova (Norway) Caroline Rohde-Moe
March 30	Heraklion, Greece; Hard $10,000; Singles and doubles draws	(Greece) Valentini Grammatikopoulou (Russia) Anastasiya Komardina; 6–2, 6–3	(Serbia) Barbara Bonić (Serbia) Tamara Čurović	(Germany) Anna Zaja (Slovakia) Viktória Kužmová	(Israel) Saray Sterenbach (Serbia) Barbara Bonić (Bulgaria) Vivian Zlatanova (Norway) Caroline Rohde-Moe
March 30	Dehradun, India; Hard $10,000; Singles and doubles draws	(Chinese Taipei) Hsu Ching-wen; 7–6^{(7–4)}, 6–4	(Thailand) Nungnadda Wannasuk	(India) Dhruthi Tatachar Venugopal (Indonesia) Lavinia Tananta	(Austria) Melanie Klaffner (India) Prarthana Thombare (India) Nidhi Chilumula (India) Pranjala Yadlapalli
March 30	Dehradun, India; Hard $10,000; Singles and doubles draws	(India) Prarthana Thombare (Thailand) Nungnadda Wannasuk; 6–0, 6–4	(India) Prerna Bhambri (India) Rishika Sunkara	(India) Dhruthi Tatachar Venugopal (Indonesia) Lavinia Tananta	(Austria) Melanie Klaffner (India) Prarthana Thombare (India) Nidhi Chilumula (India) Pranjala Yadlapalli
March 30	Pula, Italy; Clay $10,000; Singles and doubles draws	(Italy) Georgia Brescia; 6–3, 3–6, 6–4	(Italy) Alice Balducci	(Hungary) Lilla Barzó (Italy) Stefania Rubini	(Belgium) Kimberley Zimmermann (Romania) Irina Maria Bara (Austria) Yvonne Neuwirth (Canada) Marie Leduc
March 30	Pula, Italy; Clay $10,000; Singles and doubles draws	(Italy) Claudia Giovine (Belgium) Kimberley Zimmermann; 7–6^{(7–4)}, 6–3	(Romania) Irina Maria Bara (Hungary) Lilla Barzó	(Hungary) Lilla Barzó (Italy) Stefania Rubini	(Belgium) Kimberley Zimmermann (Romania) Irina Maria Bara (Austria) Yvonne Neuwirth (Canada) Marie Leduc
March 30	Port El Kantaoui, Tunisia; Hard $10,000; Singles and doubles draws	(Romania) Mihaela Buzărnescu; 6–0, 6–1	(France) Lou Brouleau	(Germany) Carolin Daniels (Spain) Nuria Párrizas Díaz	(Republic of Ireland) Jenny Claffey (Belgium) Britt Geukens (Spain) Ainhoa Atucha Gómez (Belgium) Déborah Kerfs
March 30	Port El Kantaoui, Tunisia; Hard $10,000; Singles and doubles draws	(Portugal) Inês Murta (Norway) Melanie Stokke; 6–1, 7–5	(Romania) Mihaela Buzărnescu (Ukraine) Olena Kyrpot	(Germany) Carolin Daniels (Spain) Nuria Párrizas Díaz	(Republic of Ireland) Jenny Claffey (Belgium) Britt Geukens (Spain) Ainhoa Atucha Gómez (Belgium) Déborah Kerfs
March 30	Antalya, Turkey; Hard $10,000; Singles and doubles draws	(Ukraine) Alyona Sotnikova; 6–3, 6–1	(France) Caroline Roméo	(Turkey) Pemra Özgen (Hungary) Vanda Lukács	(Ukraine) Anna Shkudun (Serbia) Marina Kačar (Slovakia) Natália Vajdová (Slovakia) Vivien Juhászová
March 30	Antalya, Turkey; Hard $10,000; Singles and doubles draws	(China) Lu Jiajing (Ukraine) Alyona Sotnikova; 6–2, 6–0	(Italy) Martina Caciotti (Italy) Maria Masini	(Turkey) Pemra Özgen (Hungary) Vanda Lukács	(Ukraine) Anna Shkudun (Serbia) Marina Kačar (Slovakia) Natália Vajdová (Slovakia) Vivien Juhászová
