= 2015 ITF Women's Circuit – Hong Kong =

- Date: 5–11 January
- Edition: 1st
- Category: ITF Women's Circuit
- Prize money: $50,000
- Surface: Hard
- Location: Hong Kong
- Venue: Victoria Park, Hong Kong

Champions

Singles
- (Japan) Misaki Doi

Doubles
- (China) Han Xinyun / (Chinese Taipei) Hsu Chieh-yu
ITF Women's Circuit – Hong Kong	· 2016 →

The 2015 ITF Women's Circuit – Hong Kong was a professional tennis tournament played on outdoor hard courts. It was the first edition of the tournament which is part of the 2015 ITF Women's Circuit, offering a total of $50,000 in prize money. It took place in Hong Kong, on 5–11 January 2015.

== Singles entrants ==
=== Seeds ===
Country	Player	Rank^{1}	Seed
ROU	Andreea Mitu	118	1
JPN	Misaki Doi	124	2
BLR	Aliaksandra Sasnovich	144	3
JPN	Eri Hozumi	152	4
RUS	Ekaterina Bychkova	158	5
TPE	Chan Yung-jan	162	6
LIE	Stephanie Vogt	171	7
RUS	Marina Melnikova	183	8

- ^{1} Rankings as of 29 December 2014

=== Other entrants ===
The following players received wildcards into the singles main draw:

- (Hong Kong) Eudice Chong
- (Hong Kong) Ki Yan-tung
- (Hong Kong) Maggie Ng
- (Hong Kong) Wu Ho-ching

The following players received entry from the qualifying draw:

- (South Korea) Han Na-lae
- (Chinese Taipei) Hsu Chieh-yu
- (South Korea) Jang Su-jeong
- (Japan) Makoto Ninomiya

== Champions ==
=== Singles ===
- (Japan) Misaki Doi def. (China) Zhang Kailin, 6–3, 6–3

=== Doubles ===
- (China) Han Xinyun / (Chinese Taipei) Hsu Chieh-yu def. (Thailand) Varatchaya Wongteanchai / (Thailand) Varunya Wongteanchai, 3–6, 6–4, [10–8]
