= 2015 Ladies Neva Cup =

- Date: 23 February – 1 March
- Edition: 8th
- Category: ITF Women's Circuit
- Prize money: $50,000
- Surface: Hard (indoor)
- Location: Saint Petersburg, Russia
- Venue: Sport Club Dinamo

Champions

Singles
- (Latvia) Jeļena Ostapenko

Doubles
- (Switzerland) Viktorija Golubic / (Belarus) Aliaksandra Sasnovich
← 2008 ·	Ladies Neva Cup	· 2016 →

The 2015 Ladies Neva Cup was a professional tennis tournament played on indoor hard courts. It was the sixth of the tournament which is part of the 2015 ITF Women's Circuit, offering a total of $50,000 in prize money. It took place in Saint Petersburg, Russia, from 23 February to 1 March 2015.

== Women's singles entrants ==
=== Seeds ===
Country	Player	Rank^{1}	Seed
RUS	Vitalia Diatchenko	81	1
RUS	Evgeniya Rodina	101	2
RUS	Alexandra Panova	122	3
CZE	Kristýna Plíšková	137	4
BLR	Aliaksandra Sasnovich	144	5
RUS	Ekaterina Bychkova	152	6
BLR	Olga Govortsova	170	7
EST	Anett Kontaveit	175	8

- ^{1} Rankings as of 16 February 2015

=== Other entrants ===
The following players received wildcards into the singles main draw:

- (Russia) Anastasia Bukhanko
- (Russia) Mayya Katsitadze
- (Russia) Shakhlo Saidova
- (Russia) Polina Vinogradova

The following players received entry from the qualifying draw:

- (France) Manon Arcangioli
- (Serbia) Vesna Dolonc
- (Serbia) Ivana Jorović
- (Latvia) Jeļena Ostapenko

== Champions ==
=== Singles ===
- (Latvia) Jeļena Ostapenko defeated (Romania) Patricia Maria Țig, 3–6, 7–5, 6–2

=== Doubles ===
- (Switzerland) Viktorija Golubic / (Belarus) Aliaksandra Sasnovich defeated (France) Stéphanie Foretz / (Croatia) Ana Vrljić, 6–4, 7–5
