= 2015 Ladies Neva Cup – Doubles =

Doubles
- 2015 Ladies Neva Cup

Final
- Champions: (Switzerland) Viktorija Golubic (Belarus) Aliaksandra Sasnovich
- Runners-up: (France) Stéphanie Foretz (Croatia) Ana Vrljić
- Score: 6–4, 7–5

Events
Singles	Doubles
← 2008 ·	Ladies Neva Cup	· 2016 →

Nikola Fraňková and Anastasia Pavlyuchenkova were the defending champions, having won the previous event in 2008, however both players chose not to participate.

Viktorija Golubic and Aliaksandra Sasnovich won the title, defeating Stéphanie Foretz and Ana Vrljić in the final, 6–4, 7–5.

== Seeds ==
1. (Ukraine) Nadiia Kichenok / (Russia) Evgeniya Rodina (first round; retired)
2. (Netherlands) Lesley Kerkhove / (Netherlands) Arantxa Rus (first round)
3. (Switzerland) Viktorija Golubic / (Belarus) Aliaksandra Sasnovich (champions)
4. (France) Stéphanie Foretz / (Croatia) Ana Vrljić (final)

== Draw ==
=== Key ===
- Q = Qualifier
- WC = Wild card
- LL = Lucky loser
- Alt = Alternate
- SE = Special exempt
- PR = Protected ranking
- ITF = ITF entry
- JE = Junior exempt
- w/o = Walkover
- r = Retired
- d = Defaulted
- SR = Special ranking

First round
1	(Ukraine) N Kichenok (Russia) E Rodina	0^{r}
(Turkey) P Özgen (Belarus) S Pirazhenka	1
WC	(Russia) A Frolova (Russia) E Lyukshinova	6	6^{3}	[10]
WC	(Russia) A Bukhanko (Russia) S Saidova	2	7^{7}	[6]
4	(France) S Foretz (Croatia) A Vrljić	6	6
(Russia) M Melnikova (Ukraine) A Shkudun	3	1
(Belarus) E Dzehalevich (Ukraine) A Vasylyeva	6	5	[10]
WC	(Russia) D Afanasyeva (Russia) P Vinogradova	3	7	[7]
(Belarus) L Marozava (Russia) P Monova	6	6
(Kazakhstan) A Danilina (France) A Lim	3	1
(Germany) C Daniels (Russia) E Yashina	4	2
3	(Switzerland) V Golubic (Belarus) A Sasnovich	6	6
(Netherlands) C Burger (Uzbekistan) S Sharipova	6^{4}	6^{3}
(Russia) M Lazareva (Latvia) J Ostapenko	7^{7}	7^{7}
(Russia) M Gasparyan (Russia) A Tarasova	6	2	[10]
2	(Netherlands) L Kerkhove (Netherlands) A Rus	3	6	[7]

Quarterfinals
(Turkey) P Özgen (Belarus) S Pirazhenka	6	7
WC	(Russia) A Frolova (Russia) E Lyukshinova	1	5
4	(France) S Foretz (Croatia) A Vrljić	6	2	[10]
(Belarus) E Dzehalevich (Ukraine) A Vasylyeva	3	6	[7]
(Belarus) L Marozava (Russia) P Monova	7^{7}	4	[2]
3	(Switzerland) V Golubic (Belarus) A Sasnovich	6^{0}	6	[10]
(Russia) M Lazareva (Latvia) J Ostapenko	5	5
(Russia) M Gasparyan (Russia) A Tarasova	7	7

Semifinals
(Turkey) P Özgen (Belarus) S Pirazhenka	4	6	[3]
4	(France) S Foretz (Croatia) A Vrljić	6	3	[10]
3	(Switzerland) V Golubic (Belarus) A Sasnovich	4	6	[10]
(Russia) M Gasparyan (Russia) A Tarasova	6	1	[8]

Final
4	(France) S Foretz (Croatia) A Vrljić	4	5
3	(Switzerland) V Golubic (Belarus) A Sasnovich	6	7
