= 2015 ITF Women's Circuit – Hong Kong – Doubles =

Hong Kong – Doubles
- 2015 ITF Women's Circuit – Hong Kong

Final
- Champions: (China) Han Xinyun (Chinese Taipei) Hsu Chieh-yu
- Runners-up: (Thailand) Varatchaya Wongteanchai (Thailand) Varunya Wongteanchai
- Score: 3–6, 6–4, [10–8]

Events
Singles	Doubles
← 2014 ·	ITF Women's Circuit – Hong Kong	· 2016 →

This was a new event in the 2015 ITF Women's Circuit.

The top seeds Han Xinyun and Hsu Chieh-yu won the title, defeating Thai sisters Varatchaya and Varunya Wongteanchai in the final, 3–6, 6–4, [10–8].

== Seeds ==
1. (China) Han Xinyun / (Chinese Taipei) Hsu Chieh-yu (champions)
2. (Japan) Misaki Doi / (Japan) Hiroko Kuwata (first round)
3. (Japan) Miki Miyamura / (Japan) Junri Namigata (quarterfinals)
4. (Japan) Eri Hozumi / (Japan) Makoto Ninomiya (semifinals)

== Draw ==
=== Key ===
- Q = Qualifier
- WC = Wild card
- LL = Lucky loser
- Alt = Alternate
- SE = Special exempt
- PR = Protected ranking
- ITF = ITF entry
- JE = Junior exempt
- w/o = Walkover
- r = Retired
- d = Defaulted
- SR = Special ranking

First round
1	(China) X Han (Chinese Taipei) C-y Hsu	7^{7}	7^{7}
(Japan) C Okadaue (Japan) Y Sema	6^{1}	6^{5}
(Uzbekistan) A Khabibulina (Russia) M Melnikova	6	4	[10]
(Thailand) K Buayam (Thailand) Pe Plipuech	1	6	[7]
4	(Japan) E Hozumi (Japan) M Ninomiya	6	6
(Sweden) R Peterson (Liechtenstein) S Vogt	4	1
WC	(Hong Kong) M Ng (Hong Kong) C-w Sher	2	2
(Thailand) N Lertcheewakarn (Thailand) T Tanasugarn	6	6
(Thailand) Vara Wongteanchai (Thailand) Varu Wongteanchai	6	6
WC	(Hong Kong) E Chong (Hong Kong) H-c Wu	4	1
(Uzbekistan) A Amanmuradova (Belarus) A Sasnovich	1	1
3	(Japan) M Miyamura (Japan) J Namigata	6	6
WC	(Hong Kong) Y-t Ki (Hong Kong) W-k Lam	1	0
(China) K Zhang (Hong Kong) L Zhang	6	6
(China) C Liu (China) J Lu	6	6
2	(Japan) M Doi (Japan) H Kuwata	4	4

Quarterfinals
1	(China) X Han (Chinese Taipei) C-y Hsu	6	6
(Uzbekistan) A Khabibulina (Russia) M Melnikova	3	4
4	(Japan) E Hozumi (Japan) M Ninomiya	6	6
(Thailand) N Lertcheewakarn (Thailand) T Tanasugarn	0	1
(Thailand) Vara Wongteanchai (Thailand) Varu Wongteanchai	6	6
3	(Japan) M Miyamura (Japan) J Namigata	3	2
(China) K Zhang (Hong Kong) L Zhang	3	7^{7}	[10]
(China) C Liu (China) J Lu	6	6^{4}	[8]

Semifinals
1	(China) X Han (Chinese Taipei) C-y Hsu	5	6	[10]
4	(Japan) E Hozumi (Japan) M Ninomiya	7	4	[8]
(Thailand) Vara Wongteanchai (Thailand) Varu Wongteanchai	6	6
(China) K Zhang (Hong Kong) L Zhang	4	2

Final
1	(China) X Han (Chinese Taipei) C-y Hsu	3	6	[10]
(Thailand) Vara Wongteanchai (Thailand) Varu Wongteanchai	6	4	[8]
