= 2015 Ladies Neva Cup – Singles =

Singles
- 2015 Ladies Neva Cup

Final
- Champion: (Latvia) Jeļena Ostapenko
- Runner-up: (Romania) Patricia Maria Țig
- Score: 3–6, 7–5, 6–2

Events
Singles	Doubles
← 2008 ·	Ladies Neva Cup	· 2016 →

Magdaléna Rybáriková was the defending champion, having won the previous event in 2008, however she chose not to participate.

Qualifier Jeļena Ostapenko won the title, defeating Patricia Maria Țig in the final, 3–6, 7–5, 6–2.

== Seeds ==
1. (Russia) Vitalia Diatchenko (second round; retired)
2. (Russia) Evgeniya Rodina (first round)
3. (Russia) Alexandra Panova (first round)
4. (Czech Republic) Kristýna Plíšková (second round; retired)
5. (Belarus) Aliaksandra Sasnovich (semifinals)
6. (Russia) Ekaterina Bychkova (first round)
7. (Belarus) Olga Govortsova (first round; retired)
8. (Estonia) Anett Kontaveit (second round)

== Main draw ==
=== Key ===
- Q = Qualifier
- WC = Wild card
- LL = Lucky loser
- Alt = Alternate
- SE = Special exempt
- PR = Protected ranking
- ITF = ITF entry
- JE = Junior exempt
- w/o = Walkover
- r = Retired
- d = Defaulted
- SR = Special ranking

=== Finals ===
Semifinals
Q	(Latvia) Jeļena Ostapenko	1	6	6
5	(Belarus) Aliaksandra Sasnovich	6	2	4
(Romania) Patricia Maria Țig	7	6
Q	(Serbia) Vesna Dolonc	5	1

Final
Q	(Latvia) Jeļena Ostapenko	3	7	6
(Romania) Patricia Maria Țig	6	5	2

=== Top half ===
First round
1	(Russia) V Diatchenko	6	6
(Ukraine) N Kichenok	0	3
Q	(Serbia) I Jorović	6	2	6
(Netherlands) A Rus	3	6	4
(Uzbekistan) A Amanmuradova	6	6
WC	(Russia) M Katsitadze	4	2
Q	(Latvia) J Ostapenko	6	5
7	(Belarus) O Govortsova	2	1^{r}
3	(Russia) A Panova	4	4
(Netherlands) C Burger	6	6
(Turkey) P Özgen	6	6
(Russia) E Alexandrova	3	3
(Netherlands) L Kerkhove	3	6	6
(Russia) M Sirotkina	6	4	2
(Russia) M Melnikova	3	6^{5}
5	(Belarus) A Sasnovich	6	7^{7}

Second round
1	(Russia) V Diatchenko	4	1^{r}
Q	(Serbia) I Jorović	6	2
(Uzbekistan) A Amanmuradova	1	3
Q	(Latvia) J Ostapenko	6	6
(Netherlands) C Burger	6	6
(Turkey) P Özgen	1	4
(Netherlands) L Kerkhove	3	6	0
5	(Belarus) A Sasnovich	6	4	6

Quarterfinals
Q	(Serbia) I Jorović	7^{7}	1	4
Q	(Latvia) J Ostapenko	6^{5}	6	6
(Netherlands) C Burger	1	1
5	(Belarus) A Sasnovich	6	6

Semifinals
Q	(Latvia) J Ostapenko	1	6	6
5	(Belarus) A Sasnovich	6	2	4

=== Bottom half ===
First round
8	(Estonia) A Kontaveit	6	6
(Switzerland) V Golubic	4	4
WC	(Russia) A Bukhanko	0	1
(Romania) PM Țig	6	6
(Croatia) A Vrljić	7	5	7^{7}
(Russia) M Gasparyan	5	7	6^{0}
(France) S Foretz	3	2
4	(Czech Republic) Kr Plíšková	6	6
6	(Russia) E Bychkova	5	3
WC	(Russia) S Saidova	7	6
(Ukraine) A Vasylyeva	2	4
Q	(France) M Arcangioli	6	6
Q	(Serbia) V Dolonc	7	7
WC	(Russia) P Vinogradova	5	5
(France) A Lim	6	6^{7}	6
2	(Russia) E Rodina	3	7^{9}	3

Second round
8	(Estonia) A Kontaveit	3	3
(Romania) PM Țig	6	6
(Croatia) A Vrljić	7^{7}	6^{7}	3
4	(Czech Republic) Kr Plíšková	6^{5}	7^{9}	0^{r}
WC	(Russia) S Saidova	6	6
Q	(France) M Arcangioli	1	3
Q	(Serbia) V Dolonc	6	7
(France) A Lim	1	5

Quarterfinals
(Romania) PM Țig	6	6
(Croatia) A Vrljić	1	1
WC	(Russia) S Saidova	6^{3}	6	3
Q	(Serbia) V Dolonc	7^{7}	2	6

Semifinals
(Romania) PM Țig	7	6
Q	(Serbia) V Dolonc	5	1
