= ITF Women's Circuit – Hong Kong =

Tournament information
- Tour: ITF Women's Circuit
- Location: Hong Kong
- Venue: Victoria Park, Hong Kong
- Surface: Hard
- Draw: 32S/32Q/16D
- Prize money: $25,000
- Website: Website

The ITF Women's Circuit – Hong Kong is a tournament for professional female tennis players played on outdoor hardcourts. The event is classified as a $25,000 ITF Women's Circuit tournament and was first held in Hong Kong in 2015.

== Past finals ==
=== Singles ===
Year	Champion	Runner-up	Score
2020 (2)	(Russia) Anastasiya Komardina	(China) Xun Fangying	3–6, 6–4, 6–2
2020 (1)	(Kazakhstan) Zarina Diyas	(China) Zhu Lin	6–4, 7–5
2019 (2)	(Ukraine) Daria Lopatetska	(China) Ma Shuyue	6–4, 6–3
2019 (1)	(Ukraine) Daria Lopatetska	(Czech Republic) Barbora Štefková	6–4, 6–2
2018	(Chinese Taipei) Lee Ya-hsuan	(Japan) Hiroko Kuwata	6–4, 6–4
2017	(Chinese Taipei) Lee Ya-hsuan	(United Kingdom) Tara Moore	2–6, 7–6^{(7–4)}, 6–3
2016	(Switzerland) Viktorija Golubic	(Japan) Risa Ozaki	6–3, 6–3
2015	(Japan) Misaki Doi	(China) Zhang Kailin	6–3, 6–3

=== Doubles ===
Year	Champions	Runners-up	Score
2020 (2)	(Japan) Mana Ayukawa (Hong Kong) Eudice Chong	(Japan) Momoko Kobori (Japan) Mei Yamaguchi	6–4, 6–3
2020 (1)	(Hong Kong) Eudice Chong (Chinese Taipei) Wu Fang-hsien	(Japan) Moyuka Uchijima (China) Zhang Ying	7–6^{(7–2)}, 6–1
2019 (2)	(Chinese Taipei) Chen Pei-hsuan (Chinese Taipei) Wu Fang-hsien	(Japan) Robu Kajitani (Japan) Hiroko Kuwata	6–3, 6–3
2019 (1)	(Netherlands) Michaëlla Krajicek (Czech Republic) Barbora Štefková	(Chinese Taipei) Chen Pei-hsuan (Chinese Taipei) Wu Fang-hsien	6–4, 6–7^{(3–7)}, [12–10]
2018	(United States) Yuki Kristina Chiang (Belgium) Hélène Scholsen	(Chinese Taipei) Chen Pei-hsuan (Chinese Taipei) Wu Fang-hsien	6–2, 6–3
2017	(Japan) Hiroko Kuwata (Japan) Akiko Omae	(Russia) Ksenia Lykina (Japan) Riko Sawayanagi	6–1, 6–0
2016	(Switzerland) Viktorija Golubic (Liechtenstein) Stephanie Vogt	(Chinese Taipei) Hsu Ching-wen (Finland) Emma Laine	6–2, 1–6, [10–4]
2015	(China) Han Xinyun (Chinese Taipei) Hsu Chieh-yu	(Thailand) Varatchaya Wongteanchai (Thailand) Varunya Wongteanchai	3–6, 6–4, [10–8]
