= 2015 ITF Women's Circuit – Hong Kong – Singles =

Hong Kong – Singles
- 2015 ITF Women's Circuit – Hong Kong

Final
- Champion: (Japan) Misaki Doi
- Runner-up: (China) Zhang Kailin
- Score: 6–3, 6–3

Events
Singles	Doubles
← 2014 ·	ITF Women's Circuit – Hong Kong	· 2016 →

This was a new event in the 2015 ITF Women's Circuit.

Misaki Doi won the title, defeating Zhang Kailin in the final, 6–3, 6–3.

== Seeds ==
1. (Romania) Andreea Mitu (first round)
2. (Japan) Misaki Doi (champion)
3. (Belarus) Aliaksandra Sasnovich (first round)
4. (Japan) Eri Hozumi (second round; retired)
5. (Russia) Ekaterina Bychkova (quarterfinals)
6. (Chinese Taipei) Chan Yung-jan (quarterfinals)
7. (Liechtenstein) Stephanie Vogt (quarterfinals)
8. (Russia) Marina Melnikova (first round)

== Main draw ==
=== Key ===
- Q = Qualifier
- WC = Wild card
- LL = Lucky loser
- Alt = Alternate
- SE = Special exempt
- PR = Protected ranking
- ITF = ITF entry
- JE = Junior exempt
- w/o = Walkover
- r = Retired
- d = Defaulted
- SR = Special ranking

=== Finals ===
Semifinals
Q	(South Korea) Han Na-lae	6	3	0
(China) Zhang Kailin	1	6	6
(Japan) Hiroko Kuwata	1	6	4
2	(Japan) Misaki Doi	6	1	6

Final
(China) Zhang Kailin	3	3
2	(Japan) Misaki Doi	6	6

=== Top half ===
First round
1	(Romania) A Mitu	4	6^{5}
(Thailand) Vara Wongteanchai	6	7^{7}
Q	(South Korea) N-l Han	6	7
(China) X Han	1	5
(Russia) M Sirotkina	6	6
Q	(South Korea) S-j Jang	3	3
(Italy) G Barbieri	2^{r}
7	(Liechtenstein) S Vogt	5
3	(Belarus) A Sasnovich	2	7	0
(Japan) N Hibino	6	5	6
WC	(Hong Kong) E Chong	4	0
(China) K Zhang	6	6
(Japan) J Namigata	6	6
Q	(Japan) M Ninomiya	3	3
WC	(Hong Kong) Y-t Ki	0	0
5	(Russia) E Bychkova	6	6

Second round
(Thailand) Vara Wongteanchai	4	2
Q	(South Korea) N-l Han	6	6
(Russia) M Sirotkina	5	2
7	(Liechtenstein) S Vogt	7	6
(Japan) N Hibino	3	6	4
(China) K Zhang	6	4	6
(Japan) J Namigata	4	2
5	(Russia) E Bychkova	6	6

Quarterfinals
Q	(South Korea) N-l Han	7	6
7	(Liechtenstein) S Vogt	5	4
(China) K Zhang	6	0	6
5	(Russia) E Bychkova	4	6	1

Semifinals
Q	(South Korea) N-l Han	6	3	0
(China) K Zhang	1	6	6

=== Bottom half ===
First round
8	(Russia) M Melnikova	3	5
(Japan) M Imanishi	6	7
(Japan) N Osaka	4	6	6
(Sweden) R Peterson	6	3	4
(Japan) H Kuwata	6	6
(Hong Kong) L Zhang	2	3
WC	(Hong Kong) M Ng	0	3
4	(Japan) E Hozumi	6	6
6	(Chinese Taipei) Y-j Chan	6	1
(Italy) A Brianti	1	0^{r}
WC	(Hong Kong) H-c Wu	0	1
Q	(Chinese Taipei) C-y Hsu	6	6
(France) M Johansson	6	4	6
(Uzbekistan) A Amanmuradova	4	6	3
(Thailand) T Tanasugarn	3	4
2	(Japan) M Doi	6	6

Second round
(Japan) M Imanishi	1	1
(Japan) N Osaka	6	6
(Japan) H Kuwata	6	0
4	(Japan) E Hozumi	2	0^{r}
6	(Chinese Taipei) Y-j Chan	6	6
Q	(Chinese Taipei) C-y Hsu	2	3
(France) M Johansson	4	1
2	(Japan) M Doi	6	6

Quarterfinals
(Japan) N Osaka	4	3
(Japan) H Kuwata	6	6
6	(Chinese Taipei) Y-j Chan	2	2
2	(Japan) M Doi	6	6

Semifinals
(Japan) H Kuwata	1	6	4
2	(Japan) M Doi	6	1	6
