= 2012 ITF Women's Circuit (July–September) =

The 2012 ITF Women's Circuit was the 2012 edition of the second tier tour for women's professional tennis. It is organised by the International Tennis Federation and is a tier below the WTA Tour. The ITF Women's Circuit includes tournaments with prize money ranging from $10,000 up to $100,000.

== Key ==
$100,000 tournaments
$75,000 tournaments
$50,000 tournaments
$25,000 tournaments
$15,000 tournaments
$10,000 tournaments
All titles

== Month ==
=== July ===
Week of	Tournament	Winner	Runners-up	Semifinalists	Quarterfinalists
July 2	Torneo Internazionale Regione Piemonte; Biella, Italy; Clay $100,000; Singles – Doubles	(Sweden) Johanna Larsson; 6–3, 6–4	(Georgia (country)) Anna Tatishvili	(Italy) Nastassja Burnett (Switzerland) Romina Oprandi	(Czech Republic) Barbora Záhlavová-Strýcová (Russia) Irina Khromacheva (Romania) Alexandra Cadanțu (Romania) Edina Gallovits-Hall
July 2	Torneo Internazionale Regione Piemonte; Biella, Italy; Clay $100,000; Singles – Doubles	(Czech Republic) Eva Hrdinová (Bosnia and Herzegovina) Mervana Jugić-Salkić; 1–6, 6–3, [10–8]	(Austria) Sandra Klemenschits (Germany) Tatjana Malek	(Italy) Nastassja Burnett (Switzerland) Romina Oprandi	(Czech Republic) Barbora Záhlavová-Strýcová (Russia) Irina Khromacheva (Romania) Alexandra Cadanțu (Romania) Edina Gallovits-Hall
July 2	Colorado International; Denver, United States; Hard $50,000; Singles – Doubles	(United States) Nicole Gibbs; 6–2, 3–6, 6–4	(France) Julie Coin	(Venezuela) Gabriela Paz (Japan) Rika Fujiwara	(Canada) Marie-Ève Pelletier (United States) Jennifer Elie (United States) Madison Brengle (United States) Alexa Glatch
July 2	Colorado International; Denver, United States; Hard $50,000; Singles – Doubles	(Canada) Marie-Ève Pelletier (United States) Shelby Rogers; 6–3, 3–6, [12–10]	(United States) Lauren Embree (United States) Nicole Gibbs	(Venezuela) Gabriela Paz (Japan) Rika Fujiwara	(Canada) Marie-Ève Pelletier (United States) Jennifer Elie (United States) Madison Brengle (United States) Alexa Glatch
July 2	Reinert Open; Versmold, Germany; Clay $50,000; Singles – Doubles	(Germany) Annika Beck; 6–3, 6–1	(Latvia) Anastasija Sevastova	(Netherlands) Bibiane Schoofs (Germany) Dinah Pfizenmaier	(Netherlands) Richèl Hogenkamp (France) Kristina Mladenovic (Germany) Anna Zaja (Germany) Sarah Gronert
July 2	Reinert Open; Versmold, Germany; Clay $50,000; Singles – Doubles	(Argentina) Mailen Auroux (Argentina) María Irigoyen; 6–1, 6–4	(Romania) Elena Bogdan (Hungary) Réka-Luca Jani	(Netherlands) Bibiane Schoofs (Germany) Dinah Pfizenmaier	(Netherlands) Richèl Hogenkamp (France) Kristina Mladenovic (Germany) Anna Zaja (Germany) Sarah Gronert
July 2	Denain, France; Clay $25,000; Singles and doubles draws	(Slovakia) Kristína Kučová; 6–2, 1–6, 6–2	(Slovakia) Michaela Hončová	(Croatia) Ana Vrljić (Turkey) Pemra Özgen	(France) Iryna Brémond (Romania) Cristina Mitu (France) Mrytille Georges (France) Céline Ghesquière
July 2	Denain, France; Clay $25,000; Singles and doubles draws	(France) Myrtille Georges (France) Céline Ghesquière; 6–4, 6–2	(Slovakia) Michaela Hončová (Bulgaria) Isabella Shinikova	(Croatia) Ana Vrljić (Turkey) Pemra Özgen	(France) Iryna Brémond (Romania) Cristina Mitu (France) Mrytille Georges (France) Céline Ghesquière
July 2	Middelburg, Netherlands; Clay $25,000; Singles and doubles draws	(Belgium) Kirsten Flipkens; 6–1, 6–0	(France) Aravane Rezaï	(Russia) Elena Bovina (Japan) Yurika Sema	(Argentina) Catalina Pella (Japan) Junri Namigata (Russia) Valeria Solovyeva (Russia) Marina Melnikova
July 2	Middelburg, Netherlands; Clay $25,000; Singles and doubles draws	(Japan) Junri Namigata (Japan) Yurika Sema; 6–3, 6–1	(Netherlands) Bernice van de Velde (Netherlands) Angelique van der Meet	(Russia) Elena Bovina (Japan) Yurika Sema	(Argentina) Catalina Pella (Japan) Junri Namigata (Russia) Valeria Solovyeva (Russia) Marina Melnikova
July 2	Rovereto, Italy; Clay $15,000; Singles and doubles draws	(Switzerland) Timea Bacsinszky; 6–0, 6–2	(Germany) Anne Schäfer	(Ukraine) Irina Buryachok (Italy) Agnesse Zucchini	(France) Estelle Guisard (Norway) Ulrikke Eikeri (Italy) Claudia Giovine (Romania) Diana Buzean
July 2	Rovereto, Italy; Clay $15,000; Singles and doubles draws	(France) Estelle Guisard (Italy) Julia Mayr; 6–3, 6–3	(Romania) Diana Buzean (Netherlands) Daniëlle Harmsen	(Ukraine) Irina Buryachok (Italy) Agnesse Zucchini	(France) Estelle Guisard (Norway) Ulrikke Eikeri (Italy) Claudia Giovine (Romania) Diana Buzean
July 2	Huzhu, China; Clay $15,000; Singles and doubles draws	(China) Liu Chang; 6–3, 6–4	(China) Zhang Kailin	(China) Zhou Xiao (China) Tang Haochen	(China) Zhu Aiwen (Japan) Chiaki Okadaue (China) Tian Ran (China) Hu Yueyue
July 2	Huzhu, China; Clay $15,000; Singles and doubles draws	(China) Li Yihong (China) Zhang Kailin; 3–6, 6–4, [10–6]	(China) Tian Ran (China) Wang Yafan	(China) Zhou Xiao (China) Tang Haochen	(China) Zhu Aiwen (Japan) Chiaki Okadaue (China) Tian Ran (China) Hu Yueyue
July 2	Istanbul, Turkey; Hard $10,000; Singles and doubles draws	(Turkey) Melis Sezer; 7–6^{(7–5)}, 6–4	(Sweden) Sandra Roma	(Bulgaria) Julia Stamatova (Kyrgyzstan) Bermet Duvanaeva	(Romania) Ana Bogdan (Ukraine) Alona Fomina (Italy) Stephanie Scimone (Turkey) Başak Eraydın
July 2	Istanbul, Turkey; Hard $10,000; Singles and doubles draws	(Turkey) Başak Eraydın (Turkey) Melis Sezer; 6–1, 6–4	(Canada) Élisabeth Fournier (Canada) Brittany Wowchuk	(Bulgaria) Julia Stamatova (Kyrgyzstan) Bermet Duvanaeva	(Romania) Ana Bogdan (Ukraine) Alona Fomina (Italy) Stephanie Scimone (Turkey) Başak Eraydın
July 2	Brussels, Belgium; Clay $10,000; Singles and doubles draws	(Russia) Natalia Ryzhonkova; 6–2, retired	(Australia) Karolina Wlodarczak	(Belgium) Elyne Boeykens (Germany) Katharina Lehnert	(Croatia) Silvia Njirić (France) Chloé Paquet (Chile) Daniela Seguel (Germany) Carolin Daniels
July 2	Brussels, Belgium; Clay $10,000; Singles and doubles draws	(Chile) Daniela Seguel (Russia) Anna Smolina; 2–6, 6–2, [10–7]	(Belgium) Elyne Boeykens (Australia) Karolina Wlodarczak	(Belgium) Elyne Boeykens (Germany) Katharina Lehnert	(Croatia) Silvia Njirić (France) Chloé Paquet (Chile) Daniela Seguel (Germany) Carolin Daniels
July 2	Prokuplje, Serbia; Clay $10,000; Singles and doubles draws	(Russia) Victoria Kan; 6–1, 6–2	(Russia) Maria Mokh	(Slovakia) Chantal Škamlová (Croatia) Ana Savić	(Turkey) Hülya Esen (Slovakia) Viktória Maľová (Sweden) Aleksandra Trifunovic (Slovakia) Karin Morgošová
July 2	Prokuplje, Serbia; Clay $10,000; Singles and doubles draws	(Slovakia) Lucia Butkovská (Russia) Victoria Kan; 6–0, 2–6, [10–7]	(North Macedonia) Lina Gjorcheska (Bulgaria) Dalia Zafirova	(Slovakia) Chantal Škamlová (Croatia) Ana Savić	(Turkey) Hülya Esen (Slovakia) Viktória Maľová (Sweden) Aleksandra Trifunovic (Slovakia) Karin Morgošová
July 2	New Delhi, India; Hard $10,000; Singles and doubles draws	(Japan) Miyabi Inoue; 6–2, 6–2	(India) Ankita Raina	(India) Rutuja Bhosale (China) Yang Zhaoxuan	(Hong Kong) Katherine Ip (India) Prerna Bhambri (India) Vaniya Dangwal (India) Shweta Rana
July 2	New Delhi, India; Hard $10,000; Singles and doubles draws	(Japan) Risa Hasegawa (Japan) Miyabi Inoue; 1–6, 7–5, [10–1]	(India) Shweta Rana (India) Prarthana Thombare	(India) Rutuja Bhosale (China) Yang Zhaoxuan	(Hong Kong) Katherine Ip (India) Prerna Bhambri (India) Vaniya Dangwal (India) Shweta Rana
July 2	Sharm el-Sheikh, Egypt; Clay $10,000; Singles and doubles draws	(Russia) Anna Morgina; 6–3, 6–1	(Kazakhstan) Kamila Kerimbayeva	(Hong Kong) Venise Chan (United Kingdom) Sabrina Bamburac	(Kazakhstan) Zalina Khairudinova (Australia) Abbie Myers (Serbia) Barbara Bonić (Egypt) Magy Aziz
July 2	Sharm el-Sheikh, Egypt; Clay $10,000; Singles and doubles draws	(Hong Kong) Venise Chan (Russia) Anna Morgina; 6–1, 6–2	(Egypt) Magy Aziz (Egypt) Mora Eshak	(Hong Kong) Venise Chan (United Kingdom) Sabrina Bamburac	(Kazakhstan) Zalina Khairudinova (Australia) Abbie Myers (Serbia) Barbara Bonić (Egypt) Magy Aziz
July 2	Pattaya, Thailand; Hard $10,000; Singles and doubles draws	(Thailand) Luksika Kumkhum; 6–2, 6–2	(Thailand) Nungnadda Wannasuk	(Australia) Ashley Keir (Thailand) Nicha Lertpitaksinchai	(Chinese Taipei) Juan Ting-fei (Russia) Anna Tyulpa (Japan) Mari Tanaka (Thailand) Napatsakorn Sankaew
July 2	Pattaya, Thailand; Hard $10,000; Singles and doubles draws	(Japan) Eri Hozumi (Japan) Mari Tanaka; 4–6, 6–4, [12–10]	(Australia) Tyra Calderwood (New Zealand) Dianne Hollands	(Australia) Ashley Keir (Thailand) Nicha Lertpitaksinchai	(Chinese Taipei) Juan Ting-fei (Russia) Anna Tyulpa (Japan) Mari Tanaka (Thailand) Napatsakorn Sankaew
July 2	Toruń, Poland; Clay $25,000; Singles and doubles draws	(Montenegro) Danka Kovinić; 6–3, 4–6, 6–3	(Poland) Paula Kania	(Czech Republic) Kateřina Kramperová (Slovakia) Zuzana Zlochová	(Poland) Sylwia Zagórska (Ukraine) Nadiia Kichenok (Latvia) Diāna Marcinkēviča (Slovakia) Anna Karolína Schmiedlová
July 2	Toruń, Poland; Clay $25,000; Singles and doubles draws	(Czech Republic) Kateřina Kramperová (Czech Republic) Martina Kubičíková; 1–6, 6–3, [10–4]	(Poland) Katarzyna Piter (Poland) Barbara Sobaszkiewicz	(Czech Republic) Kateřina Kramperová (Slovakia) Zuzana Zlochová	(Poland) Sylwia Zagórska (Ukraine) Nadiia Kichenok (Latvia) Diāna Marcinkēviča (Slovakia) Anna Karolína Schmiedlová
July 9	Open GDF Suez de Biarritz; Biarritz, France; Clay $100,000; Singles – Double Draw	(Switzerland) Romina Oprandi; 7–5, 7–5	(Luxembourg) Mandy Minella	(France) Pauline Parmentier (Netherlands) Arantxa Rus	(Czech Republic) Eva Birnerová (France) Virginie Razzano (Slovakia) Magdaléna Rybáriková (Bosnia and Herzegovina) Mervana Jugić-Salkić
July 9	Open GDF Suez de Biarritz; Biarritz, France; Clay $100,000; Singles – Double Draw	(France) Séverine Beltrame (France) Laura Thorpe; 6–2, 6–3	(Spain) Lara Arruabarrena (Puerto Rico) Monica Puig	(France) Pauline Parmentier (Netherlands) Arantxa Rus	(Czech Republic) Eva Birnerová (France) Virginie Razzano (Slovakia) Magdaléna Rybáriková (Bosnia and Herzegovina) Mervana Jugić-Salkić
July 9	ITF Women's Circuit – Yakima; Yakima, United States; Hard $50,000; Singles – Doubles	(United States) Shelby Rogers; 6–4, 6–7^{(3–7)}, 6–3	(United States) Samantha Crawford	(China) Zhou Yimiao (Japan) Mayo Hibi	(France) Irena Pavlovic (United States) Madison Keys (France) Victoria Larrière (United States) Madison Brengle
July 9	ITF Women's Circuit – Yakima; Yakima, United States; Hard $50,000; Singles – Doubles	(United States) Samantha Crawford (United States) Madison Keys; 6–3, 2–6, [12–10]	(China) Xu Yifan (China) Zhou Yimiao	(China) Zhou Yimiao (Japan) Mayo Hibi	(France) Irena Pavlovic (United States) Madison Keys (France) Victoria Larrière (United States) Madison Brengle
July 9	Cooper Challenger; Waterloo, Canada; Clay $50,000; Singles – Doubles	(Canada) Sharon Fichman; 6–3, 6–2	(Israel) Julia Glushko	(United States) Chieh-Yu Hsu (Canada) Marie-Ève Pelletier	(Russia) Nika Kukharchuk (Japan) Misa Eguchi (Japan) Rika Fujiwara (Austria) Nicole Rottmann
July 9	Cooper Challenger; Waterloo, Canada; Clay $50,000; Singles – Doubles	(Canada) Sharon Fichman (Canada) Marie-Ève Pelletier; 6–2, 7–5	(Japan) Shuko Aoyama (Canada) Gabriela Dabrowski	(United States) Chieh-Yu Hsu (Canada) Marie-Ève Pelletier	(Russia) Nika Kukharchuk (Japan) Misa Eguchi (Japan) Rika Fujiwara (Austria) Nicole Rottmann
July 9	Aschaffenburg, Germany; Clay $25,000; Singles and doubles draws	(Germany) Anna-Lena Friedsam; 6–4, 2–6, 6–4	(Germany) Kathrin Wörle	(Slovakia) Anna Karolína Schmiedlová (Hungary) Réka-Luca Jani	(Russia) Anastasia Pivovarova (Argentina) Florencia Molinero (Slovakia) Jana Čepelová (Romania) Elena Bogdan
July 9	Aschaffenburg, Germany; Clay $25,000; Singles and doubles draws	(Argentina) Florencia Molinero (Liechtenstein) Stephanie Vogt; 6–3, 7–6^{(7–3)}	(Denmark) Malou Ejdesgaard (Hungary) Réka-Luca Jani	(Slovakia) Anna Karolína Schmiedlová (Hungary) Réka-Luca Jani	(Russia) Anastasia Pivovarova (Argentina) Florencia Molinero (Slovakia) Jana Čepelová (Romania) Elena Bogdan
July 9	Zwevegem, Belgium; Clay $25,000; Singles and doubles draws	(Latvia) Anastasija Sevastova; 6–0, 6–3	(Turkey) Çağla Büyükakçay	(Slovakia) Kristína Kučová (Poland) Sandra Zaniewska	(Netherlands) Angelique van der Meet (Ukraine) Maryna Zanevska (Belgium) Kirsten Flipkens (Bulgaria) Aleksandrina Naydenova
July 9	Zwevegem, Belgium; Clay $25,000; Singles and doubles draws	(Romania) Mihaela Buzărnescu (Germany) Nicola Geuer; 7–6^{(7–5)}, 1–6, [10–4]	(Netherlands) Kim Kilsdonk (Netherlands) Nicolette van Uitert	(Slovakia) Kristína Kučová (Poland) Sandra Zaniewska	(Netherlands) Angelique van der Meet (Ukraine) Maryna Zanevska (Belgium) Kirsten Flipkens (Bulgaria) Aleksandrina Naydenova
July 9	Huzhu, China; Clay $15,000; Singles and doubles draws	(China) Wen Xin; 3–6, 6–2, 6–1	(China) Sun Hongrui	(China) Wang Yafan (China) Guo Lu	(China) Tang Haochen (China) Lu Xiaojing (China) Liu Chang (China) Hu Yueyue
July 9	Huzhu, China; Clay $15,000; Singles and doubles draws	(China) Li Ting (China) Liang Chen; 7–5, 3–6, [10–6]	(China) Li Yihong (China) Tian Ran	(China) Wang Yafan (China) Guo Lu	(China) Tang Haochen (China) Lu Xiaojing (China) Liu Chang (China) Hu Yueyue
July 9	Torino, Italy; Clay $10,000; Singles and doubles draws	(France) Estelle Guisard; 6–4, 6–4	(Italy) Angelica Moratelli	(Italy) Alice Moroni (Bosnia and Herzegovina) Jelena Simić	(Switzerland) Lisa Sabino (Hungary) Csilla Borsányi (Italy) Federica Quercia (France) Jade Suvrijn
July 9	Torino, Italy; Clay $10,000; Singles and doubles draws	(Spain) Lucía Cervera Vázquez (Greece) Despina Papamichail; 3–6, 6–3, [10–6]	(France) Estelle Guisard (Austria) Katharina Negrin	(Italy) Alice Moroni (Bosnia and Herzegovina) Jelena Simić	(Switzerland) Lisa Sabino (Hungary) Csilla Borsányi (Italy) Federica Quercia (France) Jade Suvrijn
July 9	Istanbul, Turkey; Hard $10,000; Singles and doubles draws	(Turkey) Başak Eraydın; 5–7, 6–4, 6–1	(Argentina) Tatiana Búa	(Slovakia) Zuzana Zlochová (Canada) Élisabeth Fournier	(Spain) Olga Sáez Larra (Japan) Akari Inoue (Russia) Polina Leykina (Spain) Silvia García Jiménez
July 9	Istanbul, Turkey; Hard $10,000; Singles and doubles draws	(Japan) Akari Inoue (Japan) Kaori Onishi; 6–1, 6–1	(Japan) Yuka Higuchi (Japan) Hirono Watanabe	(Slovakia) Zuzana Zlochová (Canada) Élisabeth Fournier	(Spain) Olga Sáez Larra (Japan) Akari Inoue (Russia) Polina Leykina (Spain) Silvia García Jiménez
July 9	Iași, Romania; Clay $10,000; Singles and doubles draws	(Romania) Patricia Maria Țig; 6–2, 3–6, 6–4	(Romania) Raluca Elena Platon	(Czech Republic) Martina Kubičíková (Romania) Gabriela Talabă	(Romania) Laura Enea (Romania) Stefania Hristov (Bulgaria) Viktoriya Tomova (Moldova) Anastasia Vdovenco
July 9	Iași, Romania; Clay $10,000; Singles and doubles draws	(Romania) Alexandra Damaschin (Romania) Patricia Maria Țig; 6–3, 3–6, [11–9]	(Czech Republic) Martina Kubičíková (Czech Republic) Tereza Malíková	(Czech Republic) Martina Kubičíková (Romania) Gabriela Talabă	(Romania) Laura Enea (Romania) Stefania Hristov (Bulgaria) Viktoriya Tomova (Moldova) Anastasia Vdovenco
July 9	Pattaya, Thailand; Hard $10,000; Singles and doubles draws	(Thailand) Nungnadda Wannasuk; 6–4, 4–6, 6–4	(South Korea) Jang Su-jeong	(Japan) Miharu Imanishi (Indonesia) Lavinia Tananta	(Hong Kong) Venise Chan (Thailand) Peangtarn Plipuech (Russia) Anna Tyulpa (China) Zhu Lin
July 9	Pattaya, Thailand; Hard $10,000; Singles and doubles draws	(Japan) Yurina Koshino (Japan) Yumi Miyazaki; 6–4, 6–3	(Thailand) Kamonwan Buayam (China) Deng Mengning	(Japan) Miharu Imanishi (Indonesia) Lavinia Tananta	(Hong Kong) Venise Chan (Thailand) Peangtarn Plipuech (Russia) Anna Tyulpa (China) Zhu Lin
July 16	BCR Open Romania Ladies; Bucharest, Romania; Clay $100,000+H; Singles – Doubles	(Spain) María Teresa Torró Flor; 6–3, 4–6, 6–4	(Spain) Garbiñe Muguruza	(France) Alizé Cornet (Romania) Alexandra Cadanțu	(Spain) Laura Pous Tió (Romania) Irina-Camelia Begu (France) Pauline Parmentier (Spain) Lara Arruabarrena
July 16	BCR Open Romania Ladies; Bucharest, Romania; Clay $100,000+H; Singles – Doubles	(Romania) Irina-Camelia Begu (France) Alizé Cornet; 6–2, 6–0	(Romania) Elena Bogdan (Romania) Raluca Olaru	(France) Alizé Cornet (Romania) Alexandra Cadanțu	(Spain) Laura Pous Tió (Romania) Irina-Camelia Begu (France) Pauline Parmentier (Spain) Lara Arruabarrena
July 16	Open 88 Contrexévile; Contrexéville, France; Clay $50,000; Singles – Doubles	(France) Aravane Rezaï; 6–3, 2–6, 6–3	(Austria) Yvonne Meusburger	(France) Kristina Mladenovic (Belgium) Kirsten Flipkens	(France) Charlène Seateun (Germany) Kathrin Wörle (Poland) Sandra Zaniewska (Ukraine) Yuliya Beygelzimer
July 16	Open 88 Contrexévile; Contrexéville, France; Clay $50,000; Singles – Doubles	(Ukraine) Yuliya Beygelzimer (Czech Republic) Renata Voráčová; 6–1, 6–1	(Croatia) Tereza Mrdeža (Croatia) Silvia Njirić	(France) Kristina Mladenovic (Belgium) Kirsten Flipkens	(France) Charlène Seateun (Germany) Kathrin Wörle (Poland) Sandra Zaniewska (Ukraine) Yuliya Beygelzimer
July 16	Viccourt Cup; Donetsk, Ukraine; Hard $50,000; Singles – Doubles	(Serbia) Vesna Dolonc; 6–2, 6–3	(Portugal) Maria João Koehler	(Poland) Marta Domachowska (Ukraine) Elina Svitolina	(Czech Republic) Andrea Hlaváčková (Russia) Alla Kudryavtseva (Russia) Ekaterina Ivanova (Ukraine) Valentyna Ivakhnenko
July 16	Viccourt Cup; Donetsk, Ukraine; Hard $50,000; Singles – Doubles	(Ukraine) Lyudmyla Kichenok (Ukraine) Nadiia Kichenok; 6–2, 7–5	(Ukraine) Valentyna Ivakhnenko (Ukraine) Kateryna Kozlova	(Poland) Marta Domachowska (Ukraine) Elina Svitolina	(Czech Republic) Andrea Hlaváčková (Russia) Alla Kudryavtseva (Russia) Ekaterina Ivanova (Ukraine) Valentyna Ivakhnenko
July 16	Astana, Kazakhstan; Hard $25,000; Singles and doubles draws	(Thailand) Luksika Kumkhum; 3–6, 6–3, 6–3	(Thailand) Nudnida Luangnam	(Belarus) Ksenia Milevskaya (Uzbekistan) Nigina Abduraimova	(Russia) Ksenia Kirillova (Ukraine) Veronika Kapshay (Kazakhstan) Anna Danilina (Uzbekistan) Vlada Ekshibarova
July 16	Astana, Kazakhstan; Hard $25,000; Singles and doubles draws	(Thailand) Luksika Kumkhum (Thailand) Varatchaya Wongteanchai; 6–2, 6–4	(Ukraine) Veronika Kapshay (Russia) Ekaterina Yashina	(Belarus) Ksenia Milevskaya (Uzbekistan) Nigina Abduraimova	(Russia) Ksenia Kirillova (Ukraine) Veronika Kapshay (Kazakhstan) Anna Danilina (Uzbekistan) Vlada Ekshibarova
July 16	Woking-Foxhills, United Kingdom; Hard $25,000; Singles and doubles draws	(Germany) Sarah Gronert; 6–2, 6–3	(Latvia) Diāna Marcinkēviča	(United Kingdom) Tara Moore (Tunisia) Ons Jabeur	(United Kingdom) Daneika Borthwick (Italy) Corinna Dentoni (United Kingdom) Naomi Broady (Paraguay) Verónica Cepede Royg
July 16	Woking-Foxhills, United Kingdom; Hard $25,000; Singles and doubles draws	(Thailand) Nicha Lertpitaksinchai (Thailand) Peangtarn Plipuech; 6–2, 7–5	(Spain) Yvonne Cavallé Reimers (United Kingdom) Nicola Slater	(United Kingdom) Tara Moore (Tunisia) Ons Jabeur	(United Kingdom) Daneika Borthwick (Italy) Corinna Dentoni (United Kingdom) Naomi Broady (Paraguay) Verónica Cepede Royg
July 16	Imola, Italy; Carpet $25,000; Singles and doubles draws	(Italy) Federica Di Sarra; 6–4, 6–2	(Italy) Julia Mayr	(Ukraine) Irina Buryachok (United Kingdom) Amanda Carreras	(Italy) Giulia Gatto-Monticone (Italy) Gioia Barbieri (Slovenia) Tadeja Majerič (Italy) Claudia Giovine
July 16	Imola, Italy; Carpet $25,000; Singles and doubles draws	(Italy) Alice Balducci (Italy) Federica Di Sarra; Walkover	(Slovenia) Tadeja Majerič (Russia) Marina Melnikova	(Ukraine) Irina Buryachok (United Kingdom) Amanda Carreras	(Italy) Giulia Gatto-Monticone (Italy) Gioia Barbieri (Slovenia) Tadeja Majerič (Italy) Claudia Giovine
July 16	Darmstadt, Germany; Clay $25,000; Singles and doubles draws	(Germany) Laura Siegemund; 7–6^{(9–7)}, 6–3	(Slovakia) Anna Karolína Schmiedlová	(Slovenia) Maša Zec Peškirič (Serbia) Vojislava Lukić	(Slovakia) Jana Čepelová (Russia) Anastasia Pivovarova (Italy) Anna Floris (Germany) Anna Zaja
July 16	Darmstadt, Germany; Clay $25,000; Singles and doubles draws	(Germany) Julia Kimmelmann (Germany) Antonia Lottner; 6–3, 6–1	(Czech Republic) Martina Borecká (Czech Republic) Petra Krejsová	(Slovenia) Maša Zec Peškirič (Serbia) Vojislava Lukić	(Slovakia) Jana Čepelová (Russia) Anastasia Pivovarova (Italy) Anna Floris (Germany) Anna Zaja
July 16	Evansville, United States; Hard $10,000; Singles and doubles draws	(United States) Mallory Burdette; 6–1, 6–2	(China) Duan Yingying	(United States) Allie Will (United States) Julia Elbaba	(Chinese Taipei) Lee Hua-chen (United States) Alyssa Grace Smith (Australia) Bojana Bobusic (China) Xu Yifan
July 16	Evansville, United States; Hard $10,000; Singles and doubles draws	(China) Duan Yingying (China) Xu Yifan; 6–2, 6–3	(United States) Mallory Burdette (United States) Natalie Pluskota	(United States) Allie Will (United States) Julia Elbaba	(Chinese Taipei) Lee Hua-chen (United States) Alyssa Grace Smith (Australia) Bojana Bobusic (China) Xu Yifan
July 16	Knokke, Belgium; Clay $10,000; Singles and doubles draws	(Australia) Jessica Moore; 6–1, 7–6^{(7–4)}	(Belgium) Ysaline Bonaventure	(Belgium) Sofie Oyen (Germany) Katharina Lehnert	(United States) Caitlin Whoriskey (Luxembourg) Claudine Schaul (Russia) Natalia Ryzhonkova (France) Jade Suvrijn
July 16	Knokke, Belgium; Clay $10,000; Singles and doubles draws	(Spain) Beatriz Morales Hernández (Australia) Alexandra Nancarrow; 6–1, 4–6, [10–6]	(Argentina) Tatiana Búa (Portugal) Margarida Moura	(Belgium) Sofie Oyen (Germany) Katharina Lehnert	(United States) Caitlin Whoriskey (Luxembourg) Claudine Schaul (Russia) Natalia Ryzhonkova (France) Jade Suvrijn
July 16	Istanbul, Turkey; Hard $10,000; Singles and doubles draws	(Turkey) Başak Eraydın; 6–3, 6–0	(Russia) Yuliya Kalabina	(Japan) Mari Tanaka (Russia) Polina Leykina	(Spain) Elena Cerezo Codina (Greece) Agni Stefanou (France) Alix Collombon (Japan) Akari Inoue
July 16	Istanbul, Turkey; Hard $10,000; Singles and doubles draws	(Japan) Yurina Koshino (Japan) Mari Tanaka; 7–5, 6–7^{(2–7)}, [10–8]	(Japan) Akari Inoue (Japan) Kaori Onishi	(Japan) Mari Tanaka (Russia) Polina Leykina	(Spain) Elena Cerezo Codina (Greece) Agni Stefanou (France) Alix Collombon (Japan) Akari Inoue
July 16	Granby, Canada; Hard $25,000; Singles and doubles draws	(Canada) Eugenie Bouchard; 6–2, 5–2, retired	(Canada) Stéphanie Dubois	(Israel) Julia Glushko (France) Julie Coin	(Japan) Aiko Nakamura (Canada) Gabriela Dabrowski (Canada) Marie-Ève Pelletier (United States) Alison Riske
July 16	Granby, Canada; Hard $25,000; Singles and doubles draws	(Canada) Sharon Fichman (Canada) Marie-Ève Pelletier; 4–6, 7–5, [10–4]	(Japan) Shuko Aoyama (Japan) Miki Miyamura	(Israel) Julia Glushko (France) Julie Coin	(Japan) Aiko Nakamura (Canada) Gabriela Dabrowski (Canada) Marie-Ève Pelletier (United States) Alison Riske
July 16	Campos do Jordão, Brazil; Hard $25,000; Singles and doubles draws	(Argentina) María Irigoyen; 7–5, 6–0	(Croatia) Donna Vekić	(Brazil) Paula Cristina Gonçalves (Norway) Ulrikke Eikeri	(Brazil) Maria Fernanda Alves (Brazil) Roxane Vaisemberg (Brazil) Beatriz Haddad Maia (Mexico) Ximena Hermoso
July 16	Campos do Jordão, Brazil; Hard $25,000; Singles and doubles draws	(Australia) Monique Adamczak (Brazil) Maria Fernanda Alves; 4–6, 6–3, [10–3]	(Brazil) Paula Cristina Gonçalves (Brazil) Roxane Vaisemberg	(Brazil) Paula Cristina Gonçalves (Norway) Ulrikke Eikeri	(Brazil) Maria Fernanda Alves (Brazil) Roxane Vaisemberg (Brazil) Beatriz Haddad Maia (Mexico) Ximena Hermoso
July 16	Cochabamba, Bolivia; Clay $10,000; Singles and doubles draws	(Peru) Patricia Kú Flores; 6–0, 6–4	(Mexico) Victoria Lozano	(Venezuela) Gabriela Coglitore (Switzerland) Samira Giger	(Argentina) Sofía Luini (Argentina) Francesca Rescaldani (Chile) Camila Silva (Peru) Katherine Miranda Chang
July 16	Cochabamba, Bolivia; Clay $10,000; Singles and doubles draws	(Paraguay) Jazmín Britos (Peru) Katherine Miranda Chang; 3–6, 7–5, [10–5]	(Mexico) Victoria Lozano (Chile) Camila Silva	(Venezuela) Gabriela Coglitore (Switzerland) Samira Giger	(Argentina) Sofía Luini (Argentina) Francesca Rescaldani (Chile) Camila Silva (Peru) Katherine Miranda Chang
July 23	President's Cup; Astana, Kazakhstan; Hard $100,000; Singles – Doubles	(Portugal) Maria João Koehler; 7–5, 6–2	(Russia) Marta Sirotkina	(Poland) Paula Kania (Georgia (country)) Sofia Shapatava	(Russia) Ekaterina Bychkova (Turkey) Çağla Büyükakçay (Germany) Dinah Pfizenmaier (Thailand) Luksika Kumkhum
July 23	President's Cup; Astana, Kazakhstan; Hard $100,000; Singles – Doubles	(Georgia (country)) Oksana Kalashnikova (Russia) Marta Sirotkina; 3–6, 6–4, [10–2]	(Ukraine) Lyudmyla Kichenok (Ukraine) Nadiia Kichenok	(Poland) Paula Kania (Georgia (country)) Sofia Shapatava	(Russia) Ekaterina Bychkova (Turkey) Çağla Büyükakçay (Germany) Dinah Pfizenmaier (Thailand) Luksika Kumkhum
July 23	ITS Cup; Olomouc, Czech Republic; Clay $100,000; Singles – Doubles	(Spain) María Teresa Torró Flor; 6–2, 6–3	(Romania) Alexandra Cadanțu	(Austria) Yvonne Meusburger (Italy) Corinna Dentoni	(Germany) Tatjana Malek (Italy) Maria Elena Camerin (Romania) Mădălina Gojnea (Puerto Rico) Monica Puig
July 23	ITS Cup; Olomouc, Czech Republic; Clay $100,000; Singles – Doubles	(Spain) Inés Ferrer Suárez (Netherlands) Richèl Hogenkamp; 6–2, 7–6^{(7–4)}	(Ukraine) Yuliya Beygelzimer (Czech Republic) Renata Voráčová	(Austria) Yvonne Meusburger (Italy) Corinna Dentoni	(Germany) Tatjana Malek (Italy) Maria Elena Camerin (Romania) Mădălina Gojnea (Puerto Rico) Monica Puig
July 23	Fifth Third Bank Tennis Championships; Lexington, United States; Hard $50,000; Singles – Doubles	(Israel) Julia Glushko; 6–3, 6–0	(United Kingdom) Johanna Konta	(United States) Madison Keys (Japan) Misaki Doi	(United States) Mallory Burdette (United States) Bethanie Mattek-Sands (Australia) Bojana Bobusic (United States) Shelby Rogers
July 23	Fifth Third Bank Tennis Championships; Lexington, United States; Hard $50,000; Singles – Doubles	(Japan) Shuko Aoyama (China) Xu Yifan; 7–5, 6–7^{(4–7)}, [10–4]	(Israel) Julia Glushko (Australia) Olivia Rogowska	(United States) Madison Keys (Japan) Misaki Doi	(United States) Mallory Burdette (United States) Bethanie Mattek-Sands (Australia) Bojana Bobusic (United States) Shelby Rogers
July 23	Wrexham, United Kingdom; Hard $25,000; Singles and doubles draws	(Germany) Carina Witthöft; 6–2, 6–7^{(4–7)}, 6–2	(Croatia) Donna Vekić	(Germany) Nicola Geuer (Venezuela) Adriana Pérez	(Poland) Justyna Jegiołka (Thailand) Nicha Lertpitaksinchai (Latvia) Diāna Marcinkēviča (Thailand) Peangtarn Plipuech
July 23	Wrexham, United Kingdom; Hard $25,000; Singles and doubles draws	(Austria) Nicole Rottmann (Slovakia) Lenka Wienerová; 6–1, 6–1	(Japan) Yuka Higuchi (Japan) Hirono Watanabe	(Germany) Nicola Geuer (Venezuela) Adriana Pérez	(Poland) Justyna Jegiołka (Thailand) Nicha Lertpitaksinchai (Latvia) Diāna Marcinkēviča (Thailand) Peangtarn Plipuech
July 23	Les Contamines-Montjoie, France; Hard $25,000; Singles and doubles draws	(France) Séverine Beltrame; 6–2, 6–2	(Croatia) Tereza Mrdeža	(Switzerland) Timea Bacsinszky (Italy) Anna Remondina	(France) Estelle Guisard (Slovenia) Dalila Jakupović (Germany) Sarah-Rebecca Sekulic (Japan) Akiko Omae
July 23	Les Contamines-Montjoie, France; Hard $25,000; Singles and doubles draws	(Switzerland) Conny Perrin (Slovenia) Maša Zec Peškirič; 2–6, 6–4, [10–5]	(Switzerland) Timea Bacsinszky (France) Estelle Guisard	(Switzerland) Timea Bacsinszky (Italy) Anna Remondina	(France) Estelle Guisard (Slovenia) Dalila Jakupović (Germany) Sarah-Rebecca Sekulic (Japan) Akiko Omae
July 23	New Orleans, United States; Hard $10,000; Singles and doubles draws	(United States) Julia Elbaba; 7–5, 4–6, 6–3	(Chinese Taipei) Lee Hua-chen	(United States) Jacqueline Cako (Italy) Federica Grazioso	(Japan) Sachie Ishizu (United States) Zoë Gwen Scandalis (United States) Noel Scott (Ukraine) Anastasia Kharchenko
July 23	New Orleans, United States; Hard $10,000; Singles and doubles draws	(United States) Macall Harkins (United States) Zoë Gwen Scandalis; 7–5, 6–2	(United States) Roxanne Ellison (United States) Sierra Ellison	(United States) Jacqueline Cako (Italy) Federica Grazioso	(Japan) Sachie Ishizu (United States) Zoë Gwen Scandalis (United States) Noel Scott (Ukraine) Anastasia Kharchenko
July 23	Bad Waltersdorf, Austria; Clay $10,000; Singles and doubles draws	(Italy) Julia Mayr; 6–3, 6–3	(Czech Republic) Zuzana Zálabská	(Hungary) Réka-Luca Jani (Austria) Yvonne Neuwirth	(Czech Republic) Kateřina Vaňková (France) Elixane Lechemia (Czech Republic) Klára Fabíková (Austria) Janina Toljan
July 23	Bad Waltersdorf, Austria; Clay $10,000; Singles and doubles draws	(Hungary) Réka-Luca Jani (Germany) Christina Shakovets; 6–2, 6–0	(Australia) Alexandra Nancarrow (Austria) Katharina Negrin	(Hungary) Réka-Luca Jani (Austria) Yvonne Neuwirth	(Czech Republic) Kateřina Vaňková (France) Elixane Lechemia (Czech Republic) Klára Fabíková (Austria) Janina Toljan
July 23	Viserba, Italy; Clay $10,000; Singles and doubles draws	(Italy) Gioia Barbieri; 6–4, 6–4	(Colombia) Yuliana Lizarazo	(Serbia) Milana Špremo (Argentina) Catalina Pella	(Italy) Federica Quercia (Italy) Francesca Gariglio (Italy) Erika Zanchetta (Italy) Agnese Zucchini
July 23	Viserba, Italy; Clay $10,000; Singles and doubles draws	(Italy) Maria Masini (Argentina) Catalina Pella; 6–1, 6–2	(Switzerland) Clelia Melena (Italy) Alice Moroni	(Serbia) Milana Špremo (Argentina) Catalina Pella	(Italy) Federica Quercia (Italy) Francesca Gariglio (Italy) Erika Zanchetta (Italy) Agnese Zucchini
July 23	İzmir, Turkey; Hard $10,000; Singles and doubles draws	(Japan) Miyabi Inoue; 0–6, 7–5, 7–5	(Slovakia) Zuzana Zlochová	(Japan) Mari Tanaka (Georgia (country)) Natia Gegia	(Japan) Kaori Onishi (Spain) Olga Parres Azcoitia (Romania) Ana Bogdan (Russia) Aleksandra Zenovka
July 23	İzmir, Turkey; Hard $10,000; Singles and doubles draws	(Japan) Akari Inoue (Japan) Kaori Onishi; 6–2, 1–6, [10–4]	(Russia) Yana Sizikova (Slovakia) Zuzana Zlochová	(Japan) Mari Tanaka (Georgia (country)) Natia Gegia	(Japan) Kaori Onishi (Spain) Olga Parres Azcoitia (Romania) Ana Bogdan (Russia) Aleksandra Zenovka
July 23	Horb am Neckar, Germany; Clay $10,000; Singles and doubles draws	(Germany) Laura Siegemund; 6–3, 6–0	(Italy) Gaia Sanesi	(Germany) Vivian Heisen (Russia) Natela Dzalamidze	(Germany) Laura Schaeder (Russia) Aminat Kushkhova (Germany) Yana Morderger (Germany) Verena Schmid
July 23	Horb am Neckar, Germany; Clay $10,000; Singles and doubles draws	(New Zealand) Emma Hayman (Netherlands) Jade Schoelink; 2–6, 6–3, [10–7]	(Germany) Carolin Daniels (Germany) Dejana Raickovic	(Germany) Vivian Heisen (Russia) Natela Dzalamidze	(Germany) Laura Schaeder (Russia) Aminat Kushkhova (Germany) Yana Morderger (Germany) Verena Schmid
July 23	Palić, Serbia; Clay $10,000; Singles and doubles draws	(Russia) Victoria Kan; 6–1, 6–4	(Serbia) Doroteja Erić	(Serbia) Dunja Šunkić (Romania) Camelia Hristea	(Czech Republic) Tereza Malíková (Slovakia) Karin Morgošová (Hungary) Ágnes Bukta (Serbia) Dejana Radanović
July 23	Palić, Serbia; Clay $10,000; Singles and doubles draws	(Slovakia) Karin Morgošová (Slovakia) Lenka Tvarošková; 5–7, 6–4, [10–8]	(Hungary) Csilla Borsányi (Hungary) Ágnes Bukta	(Serbia) Dunja Šunkić (Romania) Camelia Hristea	(Czech Republic) Tereza Malíková (Slovakia) Karin Morgošová (Hungary) Ágnes Bukta (Serbia) Dejana Radanović
July 23	Maaseik, Belgium; Clay $10,000; Singles and doubles draws	(Belgium) Ysaline Bonaventure; 6–2, 6–1	(Russia) Natalia Orlova	(France) Clothilde de Bernardi (France) Manon Arcangioli	(Netherlands) Kelly Versteeg (Australia) Jessica Moore (Belgium) Sofie Oyen (Belgium) Justine De Sutter
July 23	Maaseik, Belgium; Clay $10,000; Singles and doubles draws	(Netherlands) Kim Kilsdonk (Netherlands) Nicolette van Uitert; 6–4, 6–0	(United States) Brynn Boren (United States) Shelby Talcott	(France) Clothilde de Bernardi (France) Manon Arcangioli	(Netherlands) Kelly Versteeg (Australia) Jessica Moore (Belgium) Sofie Oyen (Belgium) Justine De Sutter
July 23	Tampere, Finland; Clay $10,000; Singles and doubles draws	(Sweden) Sandra Roma; 7–5, 6–2	(Russia) Alena Tarasova	(Russia) Alexandra Romanova (Germany) Bianca Koch	(France) Amandine Cazeaux (Russia) Liubov Vasilyeva (Spain) Carmen López Rueda (Netherlands) Anouk Tigu
July 23	Tampere, Finland; Clay $10,000; Singles and doubles draws	(Poland) Olga Brózda (Netherlands) Anouk Tigu; 6–4, 6–3	(Czech Republic) Nikola Horáková (Russia) Julia Valetova	(Russia) Alexandra Romanova (Germany) Bianca Koch	(France) Amandine Cazeaux (Russia) Liubov Vasilyeva (Spain) Carmen López Rueda (Netherlands) Anouk Tigu
July 23	La Paz, Bolivia; Clay $10,000; Singles and doubles draws	(Argentina) Guadalupe Moreno; 7–5, 6–3	(Chile) Cecilia Costa Melgar	(Peru) Patricia Kú Flores (Peru) Ingrid Várgas Calvo	(Argentina) Sofía Luini (Peru) Katherine Miranda Chang (Venezuela) Gabriela Coglitore (Argentina) Francesca Rescaldani
July 23	La Paz, Bolivia; Clay $10,000; Singles and doubles draws	(Mexico) Victoria Lozano (Chile) Camila Silva; 6–3, 6–2	(Venezuela) Gabriela Coglitore (Argentina) Guadalupe Moreno	(Peru) Patricia Kú Flores (Peru) Ingrid Várgas Calvo	(Argentina) Sofía Luini (Peru) Katherine Miranda Chang (Venezuela) Gabriela Coglitore (Argentina) Francesca Rescaldani
July 23	São José do Rio Preto, Brazil; Clay $25,000; Singles and doubles draws	(Argentina) Florencia Molinero; 6–3, 6–4	(Argentina) María Irigoyen	(Bolivia) María Fernanda Álvarez Terán (Australia) Monique Adamczak	(Brazil) Roxane Vaisemberg (Chile) Fernanda Brito (Brazil) Ana-Clara Duarte (Mexico) Ximena Hermoso
July 23	São José do Rio Preto, Brazil; Clay $25,000; Singles and doubles draws	(Argentina) Mailen Auroux (Argentina) María Irigoyen; 6–1, 7–6^{(7–1)}	(Argentina) Aranza Salut (Argentina) Carolina Zeballos	(Bolivia) María Fernanda Álvarez Terán (Australia) Monique Adamczak	(Brazil) Roxane Vaisemberg (Chile) Fernanda Brito (Brazil) Ana-Clara Duarte (Mexico) Ximena Hermoso
July 30	Odlum Brown Vancouver Open; Vancouver, Canada; Hard $100,000; Singles – Doubles	(United States) Mallory Burdette; 6–3, 6–0	(United States) Jessica Pegula	(Israel) Julia Glushko (United States) Chiara Scholl	(United States) Julia Boserup (United States) Madison Keys (Australia) Monique Adamczak (Australia) Olivia Rogowska
July 30	Odlum Brown Vancouver Open; Vancouver, Canada; Hard $100,000; Singles – Doubles	(Israel) Julia Glushko (Australia) Olivia Rogowska; 6–4, 5–7, [10–7]	(United States) Jacqueline Cako (United States) Natalie Pluskota	(Israel) Julia Glushko (United States) Chiara Scholl	(United States) Julia Boserup (United States) Madison Keys (Australia) Monique Adamczak (Australia) Olivia Rogowska
July 30	Empire Trnava Cup; Trnava, Slovakia; Clay $50,000; Singles – Doubles	(Latvia) Anastasija Sevastova; Walkover	(Croatia) Ana Savić	(Italy) Nastassja Burnett (Russia) Valeria Savinykh	(Bulgaria) Dia Evtimova (Netherlands) Bibiane Schoofs (Peru) Bianca Botto (Bulgaria) Elitsa Kostova
July 30	Empire Trnava Cup; Trnava, Slovakia; Clay $50,000; Singles – Doubles	(Romania) Elena Bogdan (Czech Republic) Renata Voráčová; 7–6^{(7–2)}, 6–4	(Poland) Marta Domachowska (Austria) Sandra Klemenschits	(Italy) Nastassja Burnett (Russia) Valeria Savinykh	(Bulgaria) Dia Evtimova (Netherlands) Bibiane Schoofs (Peru) Bianca Botto (Bulgaria) Elitsa Kostova
July 30	Bad Saulgau, Germany; Clay $25,000; Singles and doubles draws	(Bosnia and Herzegovina) Mervana Jugić-Salkić; 6–2, 6–4	(Germany) Carina Witthöft	(Germany) Anne Schäfer (Czech Republic) Sandra Záhlavová	(Germany) Sarah Gronert (Slovenia) Dalila Jakupović (France) Estelle Guisard (Spain) Rocío de la Torre Sánchez
July 30	Bad Saulgau, Germany; Clay $25,000; Singles and doubles draws	(Spain) Rocío de la Torre Sánchez (Austria) Nicole Rottmann; 7–5, 6–1	(Russia) Anastasia Pivovarova (France) Laura Thorpe	(Germany) Anne Schäfer (Czech Republic) Sandra Záhlavová	(Germany) Sarah Gronert (Slovenia) Dalila Jakupović (France) Estelle Guisard (Spain) Rocío de la Torre Sánchez
July 30	Rebecq, Belgium; Clay $25,000; Singles and doubles draws	(Belgium) Kirsten Flipkens; 6–2, 6–1	(France) Myrtille Georges	(Netherlands) Angelique van der Meet (Russia) Marina Melnikova	(Italy) Anastasia Grymalska (France) Constance Sibille (Bulgaria) Isabella Shinikova (Italy) Corinna Dentoni
July 30	Rebecq, Belgium; Clay $25,000; Singles and doubles draws	(Romania) Diana Buzean (Netherlands) Daniëlle Harmsen; 6–4, 6–2	(Netherlands) Lesley Kerkhove (Russia) Marina Melnikova	(Netherlands) Angelique van der Meet (Russia) Marina Melnikova	(Italy) Anastasia Grymalska (France) Constance Sibille (Bulgaria) Isabella Shinikova (Italy) Corinna Dentoni
July 30	Moscow, Russia; Clay $25,000; Singles and doubles draws	(Russia) Yuliya Kalabina; 3–6, 6–3, 6–4	(Russia) Mayya Katsitadze	(Ukraine) Kateryna Kozlova (Turkey) Pemra Özgen	(Russia) Valeria Solovyeva (Ukraine) Alyona Sotnikova (Belarus) Polina Pekhova (Russia) Tatiana Kotelnikova
July 30	Moscow, Russia; Clay $25,000; Singles and doubles draws	(Russia) Arina Rodionova (Russia) Valeria Solovyeva; 6–3, 6–3	(Russia) Eugeniya Pashkova (Ukraine) Anastasiya Vasylyeva	(Ukraine) Kateryna Kozlova (Turkey) Pemra Özgen	(Russia) Valeria Solovyeva (Ukraine) Alyona Sotnikova (Belarus) Polina Pekhova (Russia) Tatiana Kotelnikova
July 30	Vienna, Austria; Clay $10,000; Singles and doubles draws	(Austria) Barbara Haas; 6–1, 6–4	(France) Amandine Hesse	(France) Elixane Lechemia (Germany) Christina Shakovets	(Austria) Janina Toljan (Russia) Ekaterina Alexandrova (Austria) Yvonne Neuwirth (Croatia) Karla Popović
July 30	Vienna, Austria; Clay $10,000; Singles and doubles draws	(Russia) Natela Dzalamidze (Ukraine) Anna Shkudun; 6–4, 7–5	(Ukraine) Sofiya Kovalets (Germany) Christina Shakovets	(France) Elixane Lechemia (Germany) Christina Shakovets	(Austria) Janina Toljan (Russia) Ekaterina Alexandrova (Austria) Yvonne Neuwirth (Croatia) Karla Popović
July 30	Wrexham, United Kingdom; Hard $10,000; Singles and doubles draws	(Japan) Chiaki Okadaue; 2–6, 7–6^{(8–6)}, 6–4	(United Kingdom) Jade Windley	(United Kingdom) Melanie South (Japan) Mai Minokoshi	(Japan) Yuka Higuchi (United Kingdom) Anna Fitzpatrick (Republic of Ireland) Amy Bowtell (United Kingdom) Lisa Whybourn
July 30	Wrexham, United Kingdom; Hard $10,000; Singles and doubles draws	(Japan) Yuka Higuchi (Japan) Hirono Watanabe; 6–0, 2–6, [10–8]	(Mexico) Carolina Betancourt (Canada) Élisabeth Fournier	(United Kingdom) Melanie South (Japan) Mai Minokoshi	(Japan) Yuka Higuchi (United Kingdom) Anna Fitzpatrick (Republic of Ireland) Amy Bowtell (United Kingdom) Lisa Whybourn
July 30	Ankara, Turkey; Hard $10,000; Singles and doubles draws	(Romania) Laura-Ioana Andrei; 6–1, 6–0	(Uzbekistan) Sabina Sharipova	(Romania) Ana Bogdan (Japan) Kanae Hisami	(Slovakia) Zuzana Zlochová (India) Rishika Sunkara (Georgia (country)) Natia Gegia (Japan) Miyabi Inoue
July 30	Ankara, Turkey; Hard $10,000; Singles and doubles draws	(Romania) Laura-Ioana Andrei (Slovakia) Zuzana Zlochová; 4–6, 6–0, [10–4]	(Japan) Kazusa Ito (Japan) Kaori Onishi	(Romania) Ana Bogdan (Japan) Kanae Hisami	(Slovakia) Zuzana Zlochová (India) Rishika Sunkara (Georgia (country)) Natia Gegia (Japan) Miyabi Inoue
July 30	Gardone Val Trompia, Italy; Clay $10,000; Singles and doubles draws	(Colombia) Yuliana Lizarazo; 7–5, 3–6, 6–4	(Argentina) Catalina Pella	(Italy) Alice Balducci (Bosnia and Herzegovina) Jelena Simić	(Spain) Silvia García Jiménez (France) Alix Collombon (Italy) Alice Moroni (Italy) Giulia Gabba
July 30	Gardone Val Trompia, Italy; Clay $10,000; Singles and doubles draws	(Italy) Alice Moroni (Moldova) Gabriela Porubin; 6–1, 6–3	(Italy) Stefania Fadabini (Italy) Giulia Gasparri	(Italy) Alice Balducci (Bosnia and Herzegovina) Jelena Simić	(Spain) Silvia García Jiménez (France) Alix Collombon (Italy) Alice Moroni (Italy) Giulia Gabba
July 30	Fort Worth, United States; Hard $10,000; Singles and doubles draws	(United States) Elizabeth Ferris; 6–1, 6–1	(New Zealand) Dianne Hollands	(United States) Macall Harkins (Ukraine) Anastasia Kharchenko	(United States) Sherry Li (United States) Anamika Bhargava (Italy) Federica Grazioso (Japan) Sachie Ishizu
July 30	Fort Worth, United States; Hard $10,000; Singles and doubles draws	(United States) Macall Harkins (New Zealand) Dianne Hollands; 7–6^{(8–6)}, 6–4	(United States) Anamika Bhargava (United States) Elizabeth Ferris	(United States) Macall Harkins (Ukraine) Anastasia Kharchenko	(United States) Sherry Li (United States) Anamika Bhargava (Italy) Federica Grazioso (Japan) Sachie Ishizu
July 30	São Paulo, Brazil; Clay $10,000; Singles and doubles draws	(Brazil) Roxane Vaisemberg; 6–4, 4–6, 7–6^{(7–3)}	(Brazil) Ana-Clara Duarte	(Mexico) Ximena Hermoso (Brazil) Gabriela Cé	(Brazil) Nathaly Kurata (Romania) Daiana Negreanu (Argentina) Carolina Zeballos (Brazil) Paula Cristina Gonçalves
July 30	São Paulo, Brazil; Clay $10,000; Singles and doubles draws	(Brazil) Paula Cristina Gonçalves (Brazil) Roxane Vaisemberg; 6–2, 6–2	(Argentina) Aranza Salut (Argentina) Carolina Zeballos	(Mexico) Ximena Hermoso (Brazil) Gabriela Cé	(Brazil) Nathaly Kurata (Romania) Daiana Negreanu (Argentina) Carolina Zeballos (Brazil) Paula Cristina Gonçalves
July 30	Savitaipale, Finland; Clay $10,000; Singles and doubles draws	(Finland) Piia Suomalainen; 3–6, 6–3, 6–3	(France) Laëtitia Sarrazin	(Denmark) Karen Barbat (Russia) Polina Vinogradova	(Poland) Olga Brózda (Sweden) Matilda Hamlin (Spain) Carmen López Rueda (Sweden) Beatrice Cedermark
July 30	Savitaipale, Finland; Clay $10,000; Singles and doubles draws	(Denmark) Karen Barbat (Sweden) Eveliina Virtanen; Walkover	(Poland) Olga Brózda (Czech Republic) Nikola Horáková	(Denmark) Karen Barbat (Russia) Polina Vinogradova	(Poland) Olga Brózda (Sweden) Matilda Hamlin (Spain) Carmen López Rueda (Sweden) Beatrice Cedermark
July 30	Beijing International Challenger; Beijing, China; Hard $75,000+H; Singles – Doubles	(China) Wang Qiang; 6–2, 6–4	(Chinese Taipei) Chan Yung-jan	(China) Hu Yueyue (Japan) Kurumi Nara	(Japan) Junri Namigata (China) Duan Yingying (Japan) Yurika Sema (Chinese Taipei) Chan Chin-wei
July 30	Beijing International Challenger; Beijing, China; Hard $75,000+H; Singles – Doubles	(China) Liu Wanting (China) Sun Shengnan; 5–7, 6–0, [10–7]	(Chinese Taipei) Chan Chin-wei (China) Han Xinyun	(China) Hu Yueyue (Japan) Kurumi Nara	(Japan) Junri Namigata (China) Duan Yingying (Japan) Yurika Sema (Chinese Taipei) Chan Chin-wei
July 30	Santa Cruz de la Sierra, Bolivia; Clay $10,000; Singles and doubles draws	(Chile) Camila Silva; 6–4, 6–7^{(1–7)}, 6–3	(Chile) Cecilia Costa Melgar	(Peru) Patricia Kú Flores (Argentina) Luciana Sarmenti	(Argentina) Sofía Luini (Argentina) Francesca Rescaldani (Argentina) Barbara Montiel (Bolivia) María Fernanda Álvarez Terán
July 30	Santa Cruz de la Sierra, Bolivia; Clay $10,000; Singles and doubles draws	(Bolivia) María Fernanda Álvarez Terán (Argentina) Luciana Sarmenti; 7–6^{(7–4)}, 6–4	(Peru) Patricia Kú Flores (Mexico) Victoria Lozano	(Peru) Patricia Kú Flores (Argentina) Luciana Sarmenti	(Argentina) Sofía Luini (Argentina) Francesca Rescaldani (Argentina) Barbara Montiel (Bolivia) María Fernanda Álvarez Terán

=== August ===
Week of	Tournament	Winner	Runners-up	Semifinalists	Quarterfinalists
August 6	EmblemHealth Bronx Open; Bronx, United States; Hard $50,000; Singles – Doubles	(Switzerland) Romina Oprandi; 5–7, 6–3, 6–3	(Russia) Anna Chakvetadze	(United States) Chiara Scholl (United States) Alison Riske	(Germany) Tatjana Malek (United Kingdom) Johanna Konta (Argentina) Paula Ormaechea (Serbia) Vesna Dolonc
August 6	EmblemHealth Bronx Open; Bronx, United States; Hard $50,000; Singles – Doubles	(Japan) Shuko Aoyama (Japan) Erika Sema; 6–4, 7–6^{(7–4)}	(Japan) Eri Hozumi (Japan) Miki Miyamura	(United States) Chiara Scholl (United States) Alison Riske	(Germany) Tatjana Malek (United Kingdom) Johanna Konta (Argentina) Paula Ormaechea (Serbia) Vesna Dolonc
August 6	Hechingen, Germany; Clay $25,000; Singles and doubles draws	(Slovenia) Maša Zec Peškirič; 6–0, 6–4	(Bosnia and Herzegovina) Mervana Jugić-Salkić	(Belgium) Kirsten Flipkens (Poland) Paula Kania	(France) Irina Ramialison (Slovenia) Tadeja Majerič (Japan) Akiko Omae (Latvia) Anastasija Sevastova
August 6	Hechingen, Germany; Clay $25,000; Singles and doubles draws	(Bosnia and Herzegovina) Mervana Jugić-Salkić (Austria) Sandra Klemenschits; 6–2, 6–3	(Russia) Natela Dzalamidze (Czech Republic) Renata Voráčová	(Belgium) Kirsten Flipkens (Poland) Paula Kania	(France) Irina Ramialison (Slovenia) Tadeja Majerič (Japan) Akiko Omae (Latvia) Anastasija Sevastova
August 6	Monteroni d'Arbia, Italy; Clay $25,000; Singles and doubles draws	(France) Estelle Guisard; 6–3, 6–1	(Germany) Anne Schäfer	(France) Alizé Lim (Bosnia and Herzegovina) Jelena Simić	(Hungary) Gréta Arn (Latvia) Diāna Marcinkēviča (Romania) Elena Bogdan (Italy) Carolina Pillot
August 6	Monteroni d'Arbia, Italy; Clay $25,000; Singles and doubles draws	(Italy) Federica Di Sarra (Italy) Anastasia Grymalska; 6–4, 5–7, [10–7]	(Italy) Alice Balducci (Italy) Karin Knapp	(France) Alizé Lim (Bosnia and Herzegovina) Jelena Simić	(Hungary) Gréta Arn (Latvia) Diāna Marcinkēviča (Romania) Elena Bogdan (Italy) Carolina Pillot
August 6	Koksijde, Belgium; Clay $25,000; Singles and doubles draws	(Germany) Annika Beck; 6–1, 6–1	(Netherlands) Bibiane Schoofs	(Romania) Cristina Dinu (Italy) Gioia Barbieri	(Slovakia) Kristína Kučová (Netherlands) Richèl Hogenkamp (Venezuela) Andrea Gámiz (France) Myrtille Georges
August 6	Koksijde, Belgium; Clay $25,000; Singles and doubles draws	(Romania) Diana Buzean (Netherlands) Daniëlle Harmsen; 3–6, 6–3, [10–5]	(France) Myrtille Georges (France) Céline Ghesquière	(Romania) Cristina Dinu (Italy) Gioia Barbieri	(Slovakia) Kristína Kučová (Netherlands) Richèl Hogenkamp (Venezuela) Andrea Gámiz (France) Myrtille Georges
August 6	Pirot, Serbia; Clay $10,000; Singles and doubles draws	(Serbia) Teodora Mirčić; 6–3, 6–1	(North Macedonia) Lina Gjorcheska	(Serbia) Kristina Ostojić (Slovakia) Vivien Juhászová	(Serbia) Ivana Jorović (Romania) Alexandra Damaschin (Romania) Ionela-Andreea Iova (Romania) Raluca Elena Platon
August 6	Pirot, Serbia; Clay $10,000; Singles and doubles draws	(Romania) Raluca Elena Platon (Netherlands) Eva Wacanno; 6–2, 1–6, [10–8]	(North Macedonia) Lina Gjorcheska (Bulgaria) Dalia Zafirova	(Serbia) Kristina Ostojić (Slovakia) Vivien Juhászová	(Serbia) Ivana Jorović (Romania) Alexandra Damaschin (Romania) Ionela-Andreea Iova (Romania) Raluca Elena Platon
August 6	Piešťany, Slovakia; Clay $10,000; Singles and doubles draws	(Czech Republic) Kateřina Vaňková; 3–6, 6–3, 6–2	(Czech Republic) Kateřina Kramperová	(Czech Republic) Pernilla Mendesová (Ukraine) Sofiya Kovalets	(Czech Republic) Zuzana Zálabská (France) Nathalie Piquion (Slovakia) Nikola Vajdová (Japan) Mai Minokoshi
August 6	Piešťany, Slovakia; Clay $10,000; Singles and doubles draws	(Slovakia) Karin Morgošová (Slovakia) Michaela Pochabová; 6–3, 6–2	(Czech Republic) Simona Dobrá (Czech Republic) Lucie Kriegsmannová	(Czech Republic) Pernilla Mendesová (Ukraine) Sofiya Kovalets	(Czech Republic) Zuzana Zálabská (France) Nathalie Piquion (Slovakia) Nikola Vajdová (Japan) Mai Minokoshi
August 6	Bursa, Turkey; Clay $10,000; Singles and doubles draws	(Russia) Victoria Kan; 7–6^{(7–4)}, 6–4	(Romania) Laura-Ioana Andrei	(Japan) Erika Takao (Japan) Yuuki Tanaka	(Japan) Kanae Hisami (Japan) Chiaki Okadaue (Austria) Melanie Klaffner (India) Kyra Shroff
August 6	Bursa, Turkey; Clay $10,000; Singles and doubles draws	(Romania) Laura-Ioana Andrei (Austria) Melanie Klaffner; 6–2, 6–2	(Japan) Erika Takao (Japan) Remi Tezuka	(Japan) Erika Takao (Japan) Yuuki Tanaka	(Japan) Kanae Hisami (Japan) Chiaki Okadaue (Austria) Melanie Klaffner (India) Kyra Shroff
August 6	Arequipa, Peru; Clay $10,000; Singles and doubles draws	(Argentina) Aranza Salut; 7–6^{(7–4)}, 4–6, 6–1	(Argentina) Luciana Sarmenti	(Chile) Fernanda Brito (Switzerland) Samira Giger	(Hong Kong) Wan-Yi Sweeting (Argentina) Macarena Asensos (Argentina) Sofía Luini (Argentina) Carolina Costamagna
August 6	Arequipa, Peru; Clay $10,000; Singles and doubles draws	(Brazil) Eduarda Piai (Brazil) Karina Venditti; 6–1, 6–2	(Chile) Fernanda Brito (Brazil) Raquel Piltcher	(Chile) Fernanda Brito (Switzerland) Samira Giger	(Hong Kong) Wan-Yi Sweeting (Argentina) Macarena Asensos (Argentina) Sofía Luini (Argentina) Carolina Costamagna
August 13	Tatarstan Open; Kazan, Russia; Hard $50,000+H; Singles – Doubles	(Ukraine) Kateryna Kozlova; 6–3, 6–3	(United Kingdom) Tara Moore	(Ukraine) Valentyna Ivakhnenko (Slovenia) Tadeja Majerič	(Uzbekistan) Nigina Abduraimova (Ukraine) Lyudmyla Kichenok (Russia) Mayya Katsitadze (Belarus) Ilona Kremen
August 13	Tatarstan Open; Kazan, Russia; Hard $50,000+H; Singles – Doubles	(Ukraine) Valentyna Ivakhnenko (Ukraine) Kateryna Kozlova; 6–4, 6–7^{(6–8)}, [10–4]	(Ukraine) Lyudmyla Kichenok (Ukraine) Nadiia Kichenok	(Ukraine) Valentyna Ivakhnenko (Slovenia) Tadeja Majerič	(Uzbekistan) Nigina Abduraimova (Ukraine) Lyudmyla Kichenok (Russia) Mayya Katsitadze (Belarus) Ilona Kremen
August 13	Ratingen, Germany; Clay $10,000; Singles and doubles draws	(Germany) Laura Siegemund; 6–2, 6–1	(United States) Caitlin Whoriskey	(France) Alizé Lim (Germany) Nicola Geuer	(Germany) Nina-Isabella Scholten (Poland) Sylwia Zagórska (Germany) Katharina Lehnert (Georgia (country)) Ekaterine Gorgodze
August 13	Ratingen, Germany; Clay $10,000; Singles and doubles draws	(Georgia (country)) Ekaterine Gorgodze (Georgia (country)) Sofia Kvatsabaia; 6–3, 6–4	(Germany) Kim Grajdek (Poland) Sylwia Zagórska	(France) Alizé Lim (Germany) Nicola Geuer	(Germany) Nina-Isabella Scholten (Poland) Sylwia Zagórska (Germany) Katharina Lehnert (Georgia (country)) Ekaterine Gorgodze
August 13	Westende-Middelkerke, Belgium; Hard $10,000; Singles and doubles draws	(Israel) Deniz Khazaniuk; 6–4, 2–6, 7–6^{(7–5)}	(France) Irina Ramialison	(Italy) Gioia Barbieri (Belgium) Elise Mertens	(Belgium) Michaela Boev (France) Amandine Hesse (United Kingdom) Samantha Murray (Russia) Daria Lodikova
August 13	Westende-Middelkerke, Belgium; Hard $10,000; Singles and doubles draws	(Republic of Ireland) Amy Bowtell (United Kingdom) Samantha Murray; 6–3, 6–3	(Belgium) Steffi Distelmans (Belgium) Magali Kempen	(Italy) Gioia Barbieri (Belgium) Elise Mertens	(Belgium) Michaela Boev (France) Amandine Hesse (United Kingdom) Samantha Murray (Russia) Daria Lodikova
August 13	Locri, Italy; Clay $10,000; Singles and doubles draws	(Spain) Sara Sorribes Tormo; 6–3, 7–5	(Italy) Anastasia Grymalska	(Japan) Kana Daniel (Italy) Beatrice Lombardo	(Italy) Giulia Sussarello (Italy) Alessia Piran (Italy) Silvia Albano (Italy) Erika Zanchetta
August 13	Locri, Italy; Clay $10,000; Singles and doubles draws	(Greece) Despina Papamichail (Spain) Sara Sorribes Tormo; 6–1, 6–0	(Japan) Kana Daniel (Belarus) Nastassia Rubel	(Japan) Kana Daniel (Italy) Beatrice Lombardo	(Italy) Giulia Sussarello (Italy) Alessia Piran (Italy) Silvia Albano (Italy) Erika Zanchetta
August 13	Innsbruck, Austria; Clay $10,000; Singles and doubles draws	(Czech Republic) Kateřina Vaňková; 6–1, 4–6, 6–4	(Germany) Lena-Marie Hofmann	(Austria) Janina Toljan (Colombia) Yuliana Lizarazo	(Austria) Yvonne Neuwirth (Czech Republic) Denisa Allertová (Austria) Barbara Haas (Austria) Julia Grabher
August 13	Innsbruck, Austria; Clay $10,000; Singles and doubles draws	(Bosnia and Herzegovina) Jasmina Kajtazovič (Slovenia) Polona Reberšak; 7–5, 2–6, [20–18]	(Czech Republic) Klára Dohnalová (Czech Republic) Lenka Kunčíková	(Austria) Janina Toljan (Colombia) Yuliana Lizarazo	(Austria) Yvonne Neuwirth (Czech Republic) Denisa Allertová (Austria) Barbara Haas (Austria) Julia Grabher
August 13	Bucharest, Romania; Clay $10,000; Singles and doubles draws	(Romania) Laura-Ioana Andrei; 6–0, 6–1	(Belgium) Catherine Chantraine	(Italy) Andreea Văideanu (Netherlands) Lisanne van Riet	(Romania) Bianca Hîncu (Romania) Simona Ionescu (Romania) Patricia Lancranjan (Romania) Cristina Ene
August 13	Bucharest, Romania; Clay $10,000; Singles and doubles draws	(Romania) Laura-Ioana Andrei (Romania) Raluca Elena Platon; 3–6, 6–2, [10–5]	(Moldova) Julia Helbet (Ukraine) Sofico Kadzhaya	(Italy) Andreea Văideanu (Netherlands) Lisanne van Riet	(Romania) Bianca Hîncu (Romania) Simona Ionescu (Romania) Patricia Lancranjan (Romania) Cristina Ene
August 13	Istanbul, Turkey; Hard $10,000; Singles and doubles draws	(Japan) Mari Tanaka; 6–0, 6–2	(Japan) Yuuki Tanaka	(Thailand) Peangtarn Plipuech (Japan) Kanae Hisami	(India) Rishika Sunkara (India) Sowjanya Bavisetti (Romania) Ana Bogdan (Netherlands) Indy de Vroome
August 13	Istanbul, Turkey; Hard $10,000; Singles and doubles draws	(Japan) Erika Takao (Japan) Remi Tezuka; 2–6, 7–6^{(7–1)}, [10–3]	(Thailand) Nicha Lertpitaksinchai (Thailand) Peangtarn Plipuech	(Thailand) Peangtarn Plipuech (Japan) Kanae Hisami	(India) Rishika Sunkara (India) Sowjanya Bavisetti (Romania) Ana Bogdan (Netherlands) Indy de Vroome
August 13	Trujillo, Peru; Clay $10,000; Singles and doubles draws	(Peru) Patricia Kú Flores; 6–3, 6–7^{(5–7)}, 6–3	(Chile) Fernanda Brito	(Argentina) Agustina Serio (Brazil) Nathália Rossi	(Brazil) Maria Fernanda Alves (Chile) Cecilia Costa Melgar (Argentina) Luciana Sarmenti (Ukraine) Anastasia Kharchenko
August 13	Trujillo, Peru; Clay $10,000; Singles and doubles draws	(Argentina) Aranza Salut (Mexico) Ana Sofía Sánchez; 3–6, 6–1, [11–9]	(Peru) Patricia Kú Flores (Peru) Katherine Miranda Chang	(Argentina) Agustina Serio (Brazil) Nathália Rossi	(Brazil) Maria Fernanda Alves (Chile) Cecilia Costa Melgar (Argentina) Luciana Sarmenti (Ukraine) Anastasia Kharchenko
August 13	Brčko, Bosnia and Herzegovina; Clay $10,000; Singles and doubles draws	(Croatia) Jelena Pandžić; 6–3, 4–1, retired	(Serbia) Tamara Čurović	(France) Iryna Brémond (Croatia) Karla Popović	(Czech Republic) Tereza Malíková (Croatia) Neda Koprčina (North Macedonia) Lina Gjorcheska (Croatia) Tea Faber
August 13	Brčko, Bosnia and Herzegovina; Clay $10,000; Singles and doubles draws	(Croatia) Jelena Pandžić (Croatia) Karla Popović; 6–3, 6–2	(Slovakia) Dagmara Bašková (Czech Republic) Tereza Malíková	(France) Iryna Brémond (Croatia) Karla Popović	(Czech Republic) Tereza Malíková (Croatia) Neda Koprčina (North Macedonia) Lina Gjorcheska (Croatia) Tea Faber
August 20	Charleroi, Belgium; Clay $25,000; Singles and doubles draws	(Germany) Anna-Lena Friedsam; 6–4, 7–6^{(7–5)}	(Netherlands) Angelique van der Meet	(France) Séverine Beltrame (Belarus) Ilona Kremen	(Netherlands) Lesley Kerkhove (Latvia) Diāna Marcinkēviča (Belgium) An-Sophie Mestach (France) Alizé Lim
August 20	Charleroi, Belgium; Clay $25,000; Singles and doubles draws	(France) Séverine Beltrame (France) Laura Thorpe; 3–6, 6–4, [10–7]	(Belarus) Ilona Kremen (Latvia) Diāna Marcinkēviča	(France) Séverine Beltrame (Belarus) Ilona Kremen	(Netherlands) Lesley Kerkhove (Latvia) Diāna Marcinkēviča (Belgium) An-Sophie Mestach (France) Alizé Lim
August 20	Prague, Czech Republic; Clay $25,000; Singles and doubles draws	(Poland) Katarzyna Kawa; 6–4, 6–1	(Czech Republic) Renata Voráčová	(Czech Republic) Tereza Martincová (Czech Republic) Tereza Smitková	(Czech Republic) Sandra Záhlavová (Poland) Paula Kania (Germany) Anna Zaja (Slovakia) Anna Karolína Schmiedlová
August 20	Prague, Czech Republic; Clay $25,000; Singles and doubles draws	(Czech Republic) Jesika Malečková (Czech Republic) Tereza Smitková; 6–1, 6–4	(Russia) Anastasia Pivovarova (Russia) Arina Rodionova	(Czech Republic) Tereza Martincová (Czech Republic) Tereza Smitková	(Czech Republic) Sandra Záhlavová (Poland) Paula Kania (Germany) Anna Zaja (Slovakia) Anna Karolína Schmiedlová
August 20	Braunschweig, Germany; Clay $10,000; Singles and doubles draws	(Germany) Katharina Lehnert; 6–4, 2–6, 7–6^{(8–6)}	(Netherlands) Cindy Burger	(Russia) Ekaterina Alexandrova (Germany) Anna Klasen	(France) Amandine Hesse (Germany) Verena Schmid (Germany) Julia Wachaczyk (Germany) Syna Kayser
August 20	Braunschweig, Germany; Clay $10,000; Singles and doubles draws	(Bosnia and Herzegovina) Jasmina Kajtazovič (Russia) Anna Smolina; 6–1, 6–3	(Germany) Kim Grajdek (Poland) Sylwia Zagórska	(Russia) Ekaterina Alexandrova (Germany) Anna Klasen	(France) Amandine Hesse (Germany) Verena Schmid (Germany) Julia Wachaczyk (Germany) Syna Kayser
August 20	Pörtschach, Austria; Clay $10,000; Singles and doubles draws	(Austria) Yvonne Neuwirth; 5–7, 6–3, 6–3	(Austria) Janina Toljan	(Hungary) Ágnes Bukta (Serbia) Milana Špremo	(Italy) Angelica Moratelli (Croatia) Tena Lukas (Croatia) Iva Primorac (Austria) Pia König
August 20	Pörtschach, Austria; Clay $10,000; Singles and doubles draws	(Italy) Angelica Moratelli (Serbia) Milana Špremo; 1–6, 6–4, [10–4]	(Switzerland) Lara Michel (Switzerland) Tess Sugnaux	(Hungary) Ágnes Bukta (Serbia) Milana Špremo	(Italy) Angelica Moratelli (Croatia) Tena Lukas (Croatia) Iva Primorac (Austria) Pia König
August 20	Enschede, Netherlands; Clay $10,000; Singles and doubles draws	(Belgium) Elyne Boeykens; 4–6, 6–3, 6–4	(Germany) Carolin Daniels	(Georgia (country)) Sofia Kvatsabaia (Belgium) Ysaline Bonaventure	(France) Iryna Brémond (Netherlands) Nicolette van Uitert (Russia) Alexandra Romanova (Netherlands) Chayenne Ewijk
August 20	Enschede, Netherlands; Clay $10,000; Singles and doubles draws	(Georgia (country)) Ekaterine Gorgodze (Georgia (country)) Sofia Kvatsabaia; 6–4, 1–6, [10–6]	(Netherlands) Kim Kilsdonk (Netherlands) Nicolette van Uitert	(Georgia (country)) Sofia Kvatsabaia (Belgium) Ysaline Bonaventure	(France) Iryna Brémond (Netherlands) Nicolette van Uitert (Russia) Alexandra Romanova (Netherlands) Chayenne Ewijk
August 20	Todi, Italy; Clay $10,000; Singles and doubles draws	(Spain) Sara Sorribes Tormo; 4–6, 6–1, 6–3	(Spain) Rocío de la Torre Sánchez	(Armenia) Ani Amiraghyan (Italy) Federica Quercia	(Italy) Alice Balducci (Switzerland) Lisa Sabino (Italy) Martina Spigarelli (Italy) Andreea Văideanu
August 20	Todi, Italy; Clay $10,000; Singles and doubles draws	(Belarus) Nastassia Rubel (Spain) Sara Sorribes Tormo; 6–1, 6–0	(Italy) Alessia Camplone (Italy) Sara Sussarello	(Armenia) Ani Amiraghyan (Italy) Federica Quercia	(Italy) Alice Balducci (Switzerland) Lisa Sabino (Italy) Martina Spigarelli (Italy) Andreea Văideanu
August 20	Lima, Peru; Clay $10,000; Singles and doubles draws	(Peru) Patricia Kú Flores; 6–4, 6–4	(Brazil) Maria Fernanda Alves	(Chile) Cecilia Costa Melgar (Argentina) Aranza Salut	(Mexico) Ana Sofía Sánchez (Chile) Fernando Brito (Argentina) Victoria Bosio (Paraguay) Isabella Robbiani
August 20	Lima, Peru; Clay $10,000; Singles and doubles draws	(Brazil) Eduarda Piai (Brazil) Karina Venditti; 6–4, 3–6, [10–8]	(Argentina) Aranza Salut (Mexico) Ana Sofía Sánchez	(Chile) Cecilia Costa Melgar (Argentina) Aranza Salut	(Mexico) Ana Sofía Sánchez (Chile) Fernando Brito (Argentina) Victoria Bosio (Paraguay) Isabella Robbiani
August 20	San Luis Potosí, Mexico; Hard $10,000; Singles and doubles draws	(Estonia) Anett Kontaveit; 6–1, 6–1	(Mexico) Victoria Rodríguez	(United States) Elizabeth Ferris (Mexico) Marcela Zacarías	(United States) Rosalia Alda (Russia) Tanya Samodelok (United States) Jessica Lawrence (United States) Casey Robinson
August 20	San Luis Potosí, Mexico; Hard $10,000; Singles and doubles draws	(New Zealand) Emily Fanning (Estonia) Anett Kontaveit; 6–0, 6–3	(United States) Erin Clark (United States) Elizabeth Ferris	(United States) Elizabeth Ferris (Mexico) Marcela Zacarías	(United States) Rosalia Alda (Russia) Tanya Samodelok (United States) Jessica Lawrence (United States) Casey Robinson
August 27	Mamaia, Romania; Clay $25,000; Singles and doubles draws	(Canada) Sharon Fichman; 6–3, 6–7^{(5–7)}, 6–3	(Romania) Patricia Maria Țig	(Slovenia) Tadeja Majerič (Spain) Inés Ferrer Suárez	(Slovenia) Maša Zec Peškirič (Montenegro) Danka Kovinić (Romania) Alexandra Damaschin (Romania) Cristina Dinu
August 27	Mamaia, Romania; Clay $25,000; Singles and doubles draws	(Romania) Elena Bogdan (Romania) Raluca Olaru; 7–6^{(7–4)}, 6–3	(Montenegro) Danka Kovinić (Slovenia) Tadeja Majerič	(Slovenia) Tadeja Majerič (Spain) Inés Ferrer Suárez	(Slovenia) Maša Zec Peškirič (Montenegro) Danka Kovinić (Romania) Alexandra Damaschin (Romania) Cristina Dinu
August 27	Tsukuba, Japan; Hard $25,000; Singles and doubles draws	(Japan) Aki Yamasoto; 6–3, 1–6, 6–1	(Japan) Risa Ozaki	(Japan) Akiko Omae (China) Wang Qiang	(South Korea) Kim So-jung (Japan) Rika Fujiwara (United States) Tetiana Luzhanska (China) Zhou Yimiao
August 27	Tsukuba, Japan; Hard $25,000; Singles and doubles draws	(Thailand) Luksika Kumkhum (Thailand) Varatchaya Wongteanchai; 6–2, 6–2	(Japan) Yurina Koshino (Japan) Mari Tanaka	(Japan) Akiko Omae (China) Wang Qiang	(South Korea) Kim So-jung (Japan) Rika Fujiwara (United States) Tetiana Luzhanska (China) Zhou Yimiao
August 27	Bagnatica, Italy; Clay $10,000; Singles and doubles draws	(Italy) Maria Elena Camerin; 7–6^{(7–5)}, 6–4	(Italy) Karin Knapp	(Italy) Anastasia Grymalska (Italy) Alice Balducci	(Colombia) Yuliana Lizarazo (Italy) Giulia Gatto-Monticone (Italy) Corinna Dentoni (Russia) Marina Shamayko
August 27	Bagnatica, Italy; Clay $10,000; Singles and doubles draws	(Italy) Federica Di Sarra (Italy) Anastasia Grymalska; 7–5, 6–2	(Argentina) Tatiana Búa (Italy) Claudia Giovine	(Italy) Anastasia Grymalska (Italy) Alice Balducci	(Colombia) Yuliana Lizarazo (Italy) Giulia Gatto-Monticone (Italy) Corinna Dentoni (Russia) Marina Shamayko
August 27	Caslano, Switzerland; Clay $10,000; Singles and doubles draws	(Czech Republic) Kateřina Vaňková; 6–3, 6–4	(Russia) Daria Salnikova	(France) Amandine Hesse (Switzerland) Imane Maëlle Kocher	(Italy) Julia Mayr (Czech Republic) Denisa Allertová (Switzerland) Tess Sugnaux (Russia) Anna Smolina
August 27	Caslano, Switzerland; Clay $10,000; Singles and doubles draws	(Italy) Giulia Sussarello (Italy) Sara Sussarello; 6–2, 1–6, [13–11]	(Russia) Diana Isaeva (Russia) Daria Salnikova	(France) Amandine Hesse (Switzerland) Imane Maëlle Kocher	(Italy) Julia Mayr (Czech Republic) Denisa Allertová (Switzerland) Tess Sugnaux (Russia) Anna Smolina
August 27	Saint Petersburg, Russia; Clay $10,000; Singles and doubles draws	(Belarus) Aliaksandra Sasnovich; 1–6, 6–3, 6–0	(Russia) Polina Vinogradova	(Russia) Yuliya Kalabina (Russia) Aminat Kushkhova	(Russia) Alexandra Artamonova (Russia) Julia Valetova (Russia) Daria Mironova (Russia) Anastasia Frolova
August 27	Saint Petersburg, Russia; Clay $10,000; Singles and doubles draws	(Russia) Olga Doroshina (Russia) Yuliya Kalabina; 6–0, 6–4	(Belarus) Darya Lebesheva (Russia) Julia Valetova	(Russia) Yuliya Kalabina (Russia) Aminat Kushkhova	(Russia) Alexandra Artamonova (Russia) Julia Valetova (Russia) Daria Mironova (Russia) Anastasia Frolova
August 27	Yeongwol, South Korea; Hard $10,000; Singles and doubles draws	(South Korea) Lee So-ra; 6–4, 4–6, 6–3	(South Korea) Hong Hyun Hui	(South Korea) Kim Ju-eun (China) Zhang Yuxuan	(China) Yang Zi (South Korea) Jang Su-jeong (South Korea) Lee Jin-a (South Korea) Yoo Mi
August 27	Yeongwol, South Korea; Hard $10,000; Singles and doubles draws	(South Korea) Kim Sun-jung (South Korea) Yu Min-hwa; 6–3, 7–5	(South Korea) Han Na-lae (South Korea) Jang Su-jeong	(South Korea) Kim Ju-eun (China) Zhang Yuxuan	(China) Yang Zi (South Korea) Jang Su-jeong (South Korea) Lee Jin-a (South Korea) Yoo Mi
August 27	Rotterdam, Netherlands; Clay $10,000; Singles and doubles draws	(Georgia (country)) Ekaterine Gorgodze; 7–6^{(7–5)}, 2–6, 6–4	(Netherlands) Lesley Kerkhove	(Netherlands) Nicolette van Uitert (Ukraine) Anna Shkudun	(Netherlands) Bernice van de Velde (Luxembourg) Claudine Schaul (Belgium) Ysaline Bonaventure (United Kingdom) Samantha Murray
August 27	Rotterdam, Netherlands; Clay $10,000; Singles and doubles draws	(Germany) Carolin Daniels (Germany) Franziska König; 6–3, 6–4	(France) Anaïs Laurendon (France) Morgane Pons	(Netherlands) Nicolette van Uitert (Ukraine) Anna Shkudun	(Netherlands) Bernice van de Velde (Luxembourg) Claudine Schaul (Belgium) Ysaline Bonaventure (United Kingdom) Samantha Murray
August 27	Belgrade, Serbia; Clay $10,000; Singles and doubles draws	(Bulgaria) Dalia Zafirova; 6–2, 6–0	(Slovakia) Lucia Butkovská	(Slovakia) Michaela Pochabová (Serbia) Dejana Radanović	(Serbia) Marina Kachar (Slovakia) Viktória Maľová (Sweden) Aleksandra Trifunovic (Bulgaria) Julia Stamatova
August 27	Belgrade, Serbia; Clay $10,000; Singles and doubles draws	(Slovakia) Lucia Butkovská (Serbia) Natalija Kostić; 6–0, 6–3	(Slovakia) Karin Morgošová (Slovakia) Michaela Pochabová	(Slovakia) Michaela Pochabová (Serbia) Dejana Radanović	(Serbia) Marina Kachar (Slovakia) Viktória Maľová (Sweden) Aleksandra Trifunovic (Bulgaria) Julia Stamatova
August 27	Gaziantep, Turkey; Hard $10,000; Singles and doubles draws	(Russia) Margarita Lazareva; 6–1, 7–5	(Uzbekistan) Nigina Abduraimova	(Turkey) Melis Sezer (Kazakhstan) Zalina Khairudinova	(Greece) Maria Sakkari (Turkey) Sultan Gönen (United Kingdom) Laura Deigman (Ukraine) Taisiya Zakarlyuk
August 27	Gaziantep, Turkey; Hard $10,000; Singles and doubles draws	(Poland) Olga Brózda (Czech Republic) Nikola Horáková; 6–4, 6–2	(Ukraine) Khristina Kazimova (Kazakhstan) Zalina Khairudinova	(Turkey) Melis Sezer (Kazakhstan) Zalina Khairudinova	(Greece) Maria Sakkari (Turkey) Sultan Gönen (United Kingdom) Laura Deigman (Ukraine) Taisiya Zakarlyuk
August 27	Osijek, Croatia; Clay $10,000; Singles and doubles draws	(Croatia) Iva Mekovec; 6–1, 6–2	(Czech Republic) Kateřina Kramperová	(Czech Republic) Barbora Krejčíková (Slovenia) Polona Reberšak	(Slovakia) Vivien Juhászová (Croatia) Iva Primorac (Croatia) Karla Popović (Russia) Polina Leykina
August 27	Osijek, Croatia; Clay $10,000; Singles and doubles draws	(Czech Republic) Aveta Dvořáková (Czech Republic) Barbora Krejčíková; 6–4, 3–6, [10–8]	(Czech Republic) Kateřina Kramperová (Czech Republic) Petra Krejsová	(Czech Republic) Barbora Krejčíková (Slovenia) Polona Reberšak	(Slovakia) Vivien Juhászová (Croatia) Iva Primorac (Croatia) Karla Popović (Russia) Polina Leykina
August 27	Cairns, Australia; Hard $25,000; Singles and doubles draws	(Australia) Sacha Jones; 6–0, 6–2	(Hong Kong) Zhang Ling	(France) Victoria Larrière (United States) Chieh-Yu Hsu	(Japan) Sachie Ishizu (Japan) Chiaki Okadaue (South Africa) Chanel Simmonds (Australia) Monique Adamczak
August 27	Cairns, Australia; Hard $25,000; Singles and doubles draws	(Australia) Monique Adamczak (France) Victoria Larrière; 6–2, 1–6, [10–5]	(Australia) Tyra Calderwood (Australia) Tammi Patterson	(France) Victoria Larrière (United States) Chieh-Yu Hsu	(Japan) Sachie Ishizu (Japan) Chiaki Okadaue (South Africa) Chanel Simmonds (Australia) Monique Adamczak

=== September ===
Week of	Tournament	Winner	Runners-up	Semifinalists	Quarterfinalists
September 3	Save Cup; Mestre, Italy; Clay $50,000; Singles – Doubles	(Italy) Karin Knapp; 6–1, 3–6, 6–1	(Spain) Estrella Cabeza Candela	(France) Séverine Beltrame (Switzerland) Timea Bacsinszky	(Slovakia) Anna Karolína Schmiedlová (Austria) Yvonne Meusburger (Croatia) Tereza Mrdeža (Germany) Anne Schäfer
September 3	Save Cup; Mestre, Italy; Clay $50,000; Singles – Doubles	(Argentina) Mailen Auroux (Argentina) María Irigoyen; 5–7, 6–4, [10–8]	(Hungary) Réka-Luca Jani (Serbia) Teodora Mirčić	(France) Séverine Beltrame (Switzerland) Timea Bacsinszky	(Slovakia) Anna Karolína Schmiedlová (Austria) Yvonne Meusburger (Croatia) Tereza Mrdeža (Germany) Anne Schäfer
September 3	TEAN International; Alphen aan den Rijn, Netherlands; Clay $25,000; Singles – Doubles	(Czech Republic) Sandra Záhlavová; 7–5, 7–6^{(7–5)}	(Netherlands) Lesley Kerkhove	(Germany) Justine Ozga (Latvia) Diāna Marcinkēviča	(France) Myrtille Georges (Bosnia and Herzegovina) Mervana Jugić-Salkić (Netherlands) Angelique van der Meet (Netherlands) Chayenne Ewijk
September 3	TEAN International; Alphen aan den Rijn, Netherlands; Clay $25,000; Singles – Doubles	(Romania) Diana Buzean (Netherlands) Daniëlle Harmsen; 6–2, 6–0	(Italy) Corinna Dentoni (Germany) Justine Ozga	(Germany) Justine Ozga (Latvia) Diāna Marcinkēviča	(France) Myrtille Georges (Bosnia and Herzegovina) Mervana Jugić-Salkić (Netherlands) Angelique van der Meet (Netherlands) Chayenne Ewijk
September 3	Noto, Japan; Grass $25,000; Singles and doubles draws	(Japan) Kazusa Ito; 6–2, 6–4	(Japan) Misa Eguchi	(Japan) Yuuki Tanaka (Japan) Shuko Aoyama	(Japan) Mari Tanaka (Japan) Kumiko Iijima (Japan) Akiko Yonemura (United Kingdom) Tara Moore
September 3	Noto, Japan; Grass $25,000; Singles and doubles draws	(Japan) Kumiko Iijima (Japan) Akiko Yonemura; 6–1, 4–6, [10–5]	(Japan) Miki Miyamura (Japan) Mari Tanaka	(Japan) Yuuki Tanaka (Japan) Shuko Aoyama	(Japan) Mari Tanaka (Japan) Kumiko Iijima (Japan) Akiko Yonemura (United Kingdom) Tara Moore
September 3	Trieste, Italy; Clay $10,000; Singles and doubles draws	(Croatia) Iva Mekovec; 6–3, 6–2	(Argentina) Tatiana Búa	(Armenia) Ani Amiraghyan (Switzerland) Lara Michel	(Bosnia and Herzegovina) Jasmina Kajtazovič (Italy) Francesca Fusinato (Italy) Alice Balducci (Czech Republic) Jesika Malečková
September 3	Trieste, Italy; Clay $10,000; Singles and doubles draws	(Czech Republic) Petra Krejsová (Czech Republic) Jesika Malečková; 7–6^{(7–4)}, 6–1	(Italy) Giulia Gabba (Italy) Alice Savoretti	(Armenia) Ani Amiraghyan (Switzerland) Lara Michel	(Bosnia and Herzegovina) Jasmina Kajtazovič (Italy) Francesca Fusinato (Italy) Alice Balducci (Czech Republic) Jesika Malečková
September 3	Antalya, Turkey; Hard $10,000; Singles and doubles draws	(Romania) Ana Bogdan; 6–3, 6–2	(Greece) Maria Sakkari	(Slovakia) Nikola Vajdová (Poland) Olga Brózda	(Australia) Abbie Myers (Oman) Fatma Al Nabhani (Chinese Taipei) Juan Ting-fei (Canada) Élisabeth Fournier
September 3	Antalya, Turkey; Hard $10,000; Singles and doubles draws	(Poland) Olga Brózda (Czech Republic) Nikola Horáková; 6–0, 6–4	(Belarus) Darya Shulzhanok (Slovakia) Nikola Vajdová	(Slovakia) Nikola Vajdová (Poland) Olga Brózda	(Australia) Abbie Myers (Oman) Fatma Al Nabhani (Chinese Taipei) Juan Ting-fei (Canada) Élisabeth Fournier
September 3	Belgrade, Serbia; Clay $10,000; Singles and doubles draws	(Serbia) Natalija Kostić; 6–4, 6–3	(Bulgaria) Dalia Zafirova	(Hungary) Vanda Lukács (Romania) Camelia Hristea	(Switzerland) Xenia Knoll (Ukraine) Nadiya Kolb (Serbia) Danijela Tomić (Serbia) Dejana Radanović
September 3	Belgrade, Serbia; Clay $10,000; Singles and doubles draws	(Slovenia) Anja Prislan (Germany) Christina Shakovets; 6–3, 6–3	(Slovakia) Lucia Butkovská (Romania) Camelia Hristea	(Hungary) Vanda Lukács (Romania) Camelia Hristea	(Switzerland) Xenia Knoll (Ukraine) Nadiya Kolb (Serbia) Danijela Tomić (Serbia) Dejana Radanović
September 3	Yeongwol, South Korea; Hard $10,000; Singles and doubles draws	(China) Zhang Yuxuan; 7–6^{(7–2)}, 3–6, 6–3	(China) Wen Xin	(South Korea) Lee Jin-a (South Korea) Han Na-lae	(Thailand) Nungnadda Wannasuk (Japan) Kanami Tsuji (Chinese Taipei) Lee Pei-chi (South Korea) Kim Ji-young
September 3	Yeongwol, South Korea; Hard $10,000; Singles and doubles draws	(South Korea) Kim Ji-young (South Korea) Yoo Mi; 7–5, 6–4	(China) Zhang Nannan (China) Zhang Yuxuan	(South Korea) Lee Jin-a (South Korea) Han Na-lae	(Thailand) Nungnadda Wannasuk (Japan) Kanami Tsuji (Chinese Taipei) Lee Pei-chi (South Korea) Kim Ji-young
September 3	Engis, Belgium; Clay $10,000; Singles and doubles draws	(Czech Republic) Kateřina Vaňková; 6–2, 6–4	(Netherlands) Cindy Burger	(Russia) Natalia Ryzhonkova (Russia) Alexandra Romanova	(Belgium) Alison Van Uytvanck (France) Chloé Paquet (France) Constance Sibille (Germany) Carolin Daniels
September 3	Engis, Belgium; Clay $10,000; Singles and doubles draws	(Germany) Carolin Daniels (Germany) Laura Schaeder; 6–4, 6–1	(Greece) Valentini Grammatikopoulou (Germany) Lena Lutzeier	(Russia) Natalia Ryzhonkova (Russia) Alexandra Romanova	(Belgium) Alison Van Uytvanck (France) Chloé Paquet (France) Constance Sibille (Germany) Carolin Daniels
September 3	Rockhampton, Australia; Hard $25,000; Singles and doubles draws	(Australia) Olivia Rogowska; 0–6, 6–3, 6–2	(Australia) Sacha Jones	(France) Victoria Larrière (South Africa) Chanel Simmonds	(Australia) Azra Hadzic (Australia) Bojana Bobusic (Thailand) Nicha Lertpitaksinchai (United States) Alexandra Stevenson
September 3	Rockhampton, Australia; Hard $25,000; Singles and doubles draws	(Indonesia) Ayu Fani Damayanti (Indonesia) Lavinia Tananta; 5–7, 7–6^{(7–2)}, [10–8]	(Thailand) Nicha Lertpitaksinchai (Thailand) Peangtarn Plipuech	(France) Victoria Larrière (South Africa) Chanel Simmonds	(Australia) Azra Hadzic (Australia) Bojana Bobusic (Thailand) Nicha Lertpitaksinchai (United States) Alexandra Stevenson
September 3	Buenos Aires, Argentina; Clay $10,000; Singles and doubles draws	(Chile) Fernando Brito; 4–6, 7–6^{(7–5)}, 6–4	(Argentina) Vanesa Furlanetto	(Argentina) Victoria Bosio (Mexico) Ana Sofía Sánchez	(Chile) Camila Silva (Chile) Daniela Seguel (Argentina) Catalina Pella (Argentina) Ana Victoria Gobbi Monllau
September 3	Buenos Aires, Argentina; Clay $10,000; Singles and doubles draws	(Argentina) Andrea Benítez (Chile) Camila Silva; 6–3, 6–0	(Argentina) Aranza Salut (Mexico) Ana Sofía Sánchez	(Argentina) Victoria Bosio (Mexico) Ana Sofía Sánchez	(Chile) Camila Silva (Chile) Daniela Seguel (Argentina) Catalina Pella (Argentina) Ana Victoria Gobbi Monllau
September 10	Ningbo Challenger; Ningbo, China; Hard $100,000+H; Singles – Doubles	(Chinese Taipei) Hsieh Su-wei; 6–2, 6–2	(China) Zhang Shuai	(China) Duan Yingying (Thailand) Tamarine Tanasugarn	(Japan) Kurumi Nara (China) Zhou Yimiao (Italy) Alberta Brianti (China) Xu Yifan
September 10	Ningbo Challenger; Ningbo, China; Hard $100,000+H; Singles – Doubles	(Japan) Shuko Aoyama (Chinese Taipei) Chang Kai-chen; 6–2, 7–5	(United States) Tetiana Luzhanska (China) Zheng Saisai	(China) Duan Yingying (Thailand) Tamarine Tanasugarn	(Japan) Kurumi Nara (China) Zhou Yimiao (Italy) Alberta Brianti (China) Xu Yifan
September 10	Redding, United States; Hard $25,000; Singles and doubles draws	(United States) Chelsey Gullickson; 6–3, 4–6, 6–2	(United States) Allie Will	(United States) Kristie Ahn (Japan) Sachie Ishizu	(Russia) Angelina Gabueva (Germany) Nicola Geuer (United States) Sanaz Marand (United States) Katie Le
September 10	Redding, United States; Hard $25,000; Singles and doubles draws	(United States) Jacqueline Cako (United States) Sanaz Marand; 7–6^{(7–5)}, 7–5	(United States) Macall Harkins (United States) Chieh-Yu Hsu	(United States) Kristie Ahn (Japan) Sachie Ishizu	(Russia) Angelina Gabueva (Germany) Nicola Geuer (United States) Sanaz Marand (United States) Katie Le
September 10	Mont-de-Marsan, France; Clay $25,000; Singles and doubles draws	(Switzerland) Timea Bacsinszky; 6–2, 3–6, 6–2	(Brazil) Teliana Pereira	(Liechtenstein) Stephanie Vogt (Spain) Eva Fernández Brugués	(Romania) Mihaela Buzărnescu (Venezuela) Andrea Gámiz (France) Myrtille Georges (Georgia (country)) Margalita Chakhnashvili
September 10	Mont-de-Marsan, France; Clay $25,000; Singles and doubles draws	(Switzerland) Timea Bacsinszky (Romania) Mihaela Buzărnescu; 6–4, 6–1	(Bulgaria) Aleksandrina Naydenova (Brazil) Teliana Pereira	(Liechtenstein) Stephanie Vogt (Spain) Eva Fernández Brugués	(Romania) Mihaela Buzărnescu (Venezuela) Andrea Gámiz (France) Myrtille Georges (Georgia (country)) Margalita Chakhnashvili
September 10	Sofia, Bulgaria; Clay $25,000; Singles and doubles draws	(Romania) Cristina Mitu; 6–4, 3–6, 6–3	(Canada) Sharon Fichman	(Romania) Raluca Olaru (Romania) Laura-Ioana Andrei	(Ukraine) Yuliya Beygelzimer (Montenegro) Danka Kovinić (Bosnia and Herzegovina) Jasmina Tinjić (Russia) Irina Khromacheva
September 10	Sofia, Bulgaria; Clay $25,000; Singles and doubles draws	(Poland) Katarzyna Piter (Poland) Barbara Sobaszkiewicz; 7–5, 6–1	(Russia) Marina Melnikova (Romania) Raluca Olaru	(Romania) Raluca Olaru (Romania) Laura-Ioana Andrei	(Ukraine) Yuliya Beygelzimer (Montenegro) Danka Kovinić (Bosnia and Herzegovina) Jasmina Tinjić (Russia) Irina Khromacheva
September 10	Lleida, Spain; Clay $10,000; Singles and doubles draws	(France) Marine Partaud; 6–4, 6–4	(Argentina) Tatiana Búa	(Netherlands) Lisanne van Riet (Spain) Rocío de la Torre Sánchez	(Spain) Lucía Cervera Vázquez (Italy) Gaia Sanesi (Spain) Yvonne Cavallé Reimers (Greece) Despina Papamichail
September 10	Lleida, Spain; Clay $10,000; Singles and doubles draws	(Argentina) Tatiana Búa (Spain) Yvonne Cavallé Reimers; 6–2, 6–3	(Sweden) Cornelia Lister (Italy) Chiara Mendo	(Netherlands) Lisanne van Riet (Spain) Rocío de la Torre Sánchez	(Spain) Lucía Cervera Vázquez (Italy) Gaia Sanesi (Spain) Yvonne Cavallé Reimers (Greece) Despina Papamichail
September 10	Antalya, Turkey; Hard $10,000; Singles and doubles draws	(Ukraine) Ganna Poznikhirenko; 2–6, 7–5, 6–4	(Romania) Ana Bogdan	(Turkey) Melis Sezer (Turkey) Başak Eraydın	(Slovakia) Natália Vajdová (Spain) Nuria Párrizas Díaz (United Kingdom) Lucy Brown (Russia) Yuliya Kalabina
September 10	Antalya, Turkey; Hard $10,000; Singles and doubles draws	(Ukraine) Diana Bogoliy (Ukraine) Marianna Zakarlyuk; 7–5, 6–4	(Russia) Diana Isaeva (Russia) Yuliya Kalabina	(Turkey) Melis Sezer (Turkey) Başak Eraydın	(Slovakia) Natália Vajdová (Spain) Nuria Párrizas Díaz (United Kingdom) Lucy Brown (Russia) Yuliya Kalabina
September 10	Kyoto, Japan; Carpet $10,000; Singles and doubles draws	(Japan) Nao Hibino; 6–4, 2–6, 6–2	(Japan) Yuuki Tanaka	(Japan) Makiho Kozawa (Japan) Miyu Kato	(Japan) Kazusa Ito (Japan) Kaori Onishi (Japan) Risa Hasegawa (Japan) Chinami Ogi
September 10	Kyoto, Japan; Carpet $10,000; Singles and doubles draws	(Japan) Nao Hibino (Japan) Emi Mutaguchi; 6–4, 6–3	(Japan) Miyu Kato (Japan) Misaki Mori	(Japan) Makiho Kozawa (Japan) Miyu Kato	(Japan) Kazusa Ito (Japan) Kaori Onishi (Japan) Risa Hasegawa (Japan) Chinami Ogi
September 10	São José dos Campos, Brazil; Clay $10,000; Singles and doubles draws	(Brazil) Laura Pigossi; 6–2, 0–6, 7–5	(Brazil) Maria Fernanda Alves	(Brazil) Nathália Rossi (Romania) Daiana Negreanu	(Brazil) Karina Venditti (Brazil) Samantha Czarniak Rego (Brazil) Nathaly Kurata (Brazil) Yasmine Guimarães
September 10	São José dos Campos, Brazil; Clay $10,000; Singles and doubles draws	(Brazil) Maria Fernanda Alves (Brazil) Laura Pigossi; 6–0, 6–3	(Brazil) Paula Feitosa (Brazil) Nathália Rossi	(Brazil) Nathália Rossi (Romania) Daiana Negreanu	(Brazil) Karina Venditti (Brazil) Samantha Czarniak Rego (Brazil) Nathaly Kurata (Brazil) Yasmine Guimarães
September 10	Astana, Kazakhstan; Hard $10,000; Singles and doubles draws	(Russia) Polina Monova; 3–6, 6–3, 6–2	(Russia) Alexandra Romanova	(Russia) Margarita Lazareva (Germany) Kim Grajdek	(Russia) Daria Mironova (Kazakhstan) Zalina Khairudinova (Russia) Yana Sizikova (Ukraine) Valeriya Strakhova
September 10	Astana, Kazakhstan; Hard $10,000; Singles and doubles draws	(Russia) Polina Monova (Russia) Yana Sizikova; 6–3, 6–2	(Russia) Ulyana Ayzatulina (Russia) Elena Maltseva	(Russia) Margarita Lazareva (Germany) Kim Grajdek	(Russia) Daria Mironova (Kazakhstan) Zalina Khairudinova (Russia) Yana Sizikova (Ukraine) Valeriya Strakhova
September 10	Pereira, Colombia; Clay $10,000; Singles and doubles draws	(Chile) Cecilia Costa Melgar; 6–2, 6–3	(Ukraine) Anastasia Kharchenko	(Peru) Patricia Kú Flores (United States) Libby Muma	(United States) Blair Shankle (Netherlands) Jade Schoelink (Paraguay) Jazmín Britos (Venezuela) Gabriela Coglitore
September 10	Pereira, Colombia; Clay $10,000; Singles and doubles draws	(Chile) Cecilia Costa Melgar (Ukraine) Anastasia Kharchenko; 6–1, 6–0	(Venezuela) Gabriela Coglitore (Peru) Patricia Kú Flores	(Peru) Patricia Kú Flores (United States) Libby Muma	(United States) Blair Shankle (Netherlands) Jade Schoelink (Paraguay) Jazmín Britos (Venezuela) Gabriela Coglitore
September 10	Buenos Aires, Argentina; Clay $10,000; Singles and doubles draws	(Chile) Fernanda Brito; 6–3, 0–6, 7–5	(Argentina) Catalina Pella	(Chile) Daniela Seguel (Argentina) Vanesa Furlanetto	(Argentina) Carolina Zeballos (Paraguay) Camila Giangreco Campiz (Argentina) Nadia Podoroska (Germany) Karolina Nowak
September 10	Buenos Aires, Argentina; Clay $10,000; Singles and doubles draws	(Chile) Fernanda Brito (Chile) Daniela Seguel; 6–1, 6–3	(Argentina) Sofía Luini (Argentina) Guadalupe Pérez Rojas	(Chile) Daniela Seguel (Argentina) Vanesa Furlanetto	(Argentina) Carolina Zeballos (Paraguay) Camila Giangreco Campiz (Argentina) Nadia Podoroska (Germany) Karolina Nowak
September 10	Salisbury, Australia; Hard $10,000; Singles and doubles draws	(South Africa) Chanel Simmonds; 6–3, 6–0	(Slovakia) Zuzana Zlochová	(Japan) Mai Minokoshi (Australia) Sally Peers	(Japan) Akari Inoue (Indonesia) Ayu Fani Damayanti (Brazil) Gabriela Cé (Australia) Alison Bai
September 10	Salisbury, Australia; Hard $10,000; Singles and doubles draws	(Indonesia) Ayu Fani Damayanti (Indonesia) Lavinia Tananta; 7–6^{(7–5)}, 6–0	(Australia) Alison Bai (Australia) Sally Peers	(Japan) Mai Minokoshi (Australia) Sally Peers	(Japan) Akari Inoue (Indonesia) Ayu Fani Damayanti (Brazil) Gabriela Cé (Australia) Alison Bai
September 17	Aegon GB Pro-Series Shrewsbury; Shrewsbury, United Kingdom; Hard $75,000; Singles – Doubles	(Germany) Annika Beck; 6–2, 6–4	(Switzerland) Stefanie Vögele	(Russia) Marta Sirotkina (France) Julie Coin	(France) Aravane Rezaï (Netherlands) Bibiane Schoofs (Turkey) Çağla Büyükakçay (Russia) Ekaterina Bychkova
September 17	Aegon GB Pro-Series Shrewsbury; Shrewsbury, United Kingdom; Hard $75,000; Singles – Doubles	(Serbia) Vesna Dolonc (Switzerland) Stefanie Vögele; 6–1, 6–7^{(3–7)}, [15–13]	(Czech Republic) Karolína Plíšková (Czech Republic) Kristýna Plíšková	(Russia) Marta Sirotkina (France) Julie Coin	(France) Aravane Rezaï (Netherlands) Bibiane Schoofs (Turkey) Çağla Büyükakçay (Russia) Ekaterina Bychkova
September 17	Coleman Vision Tennis Championships; Albuquerque, United States; Hard $75,000; Singles – Doubles	(United States) Maria Sanchez; 6–1, 6–1	(United States) Lauren Davis	(United States) Alison Riske (Portugal) Michelle Larcher de Brito	(United States) Asia Muhammad (United States) Jessica Pegula (United States) Irina Falconi (Canada) Heidi El Tabakh
September 17	Coleman Vision Tennis Championships; Albuquerque, United States; Hard $75,000; Singles – Doubles	(United States) Asia Muhammad (United States) Yasmin Schnack; 6–2, 1–6, [12–10]	(United States) Irina Falconi (United States) Maria Sanchez	(United States) Alison Riske (Portugal) Michelle Larcher de Brito	(United States) Asia Muhammad (United States) Jessica Pegula (United States) Irina Falconi (Canada) Heidi El Tabakh
September 17	Shymkent, Kazakhstan; Hard $25,000; Singles and doubles draws	(Ukraine) Kateryna Kozlova; 6–3, 4–6, 6–4	(Kazakhstan) Anna Danilina	(Ukraine) Tetyana Arefyeva (Uzbekistan) Nigina Abduraimova	(Uzbekistan) Vlada Ekshibarova (Germany) Kim Grajdek (Slovakia) Michaela Hončová (Ukraine) Valentyna Ivakhnenko
September 17	Shymkent, Kazakhstan; Hard $25,000; Singles and doubles draws	(Ukraine) Valentyna Ivakhnenko (Ukraine) Kateryna Kozlova; 6–2, 6–4	(Uzbekistan) Nigina Abduraimova (Kyrgyzstan) Ksenia Palkina	(Ukraine) Tetyana Arefyeva (Uzbekistan) Nigina Abduraimova	(Uzbekistan) Vlada Ekshibarova (Germany) Kim Grajdek (Slovakia) Michaela Hončová (Ukraine) Valentyna Ivakhnenko
September 17	Batumi, Georgia; Hard $15,000; Singles and doubles draws	(Armenia) Ani Amiraghyan; 6–1, 6–3	(Ukraine) Anna Shkudun	(Russia) Yuliya Kalabina (Ukraine) Olga Ianchuk	(Georgia (country)) Ekaterine Gorgodze (Russia) Eugeniya Pashkova (Ukraine) Elizaveta Ianchuk (Georgia (country)) Sofia Kvatsabaia
September 17	Batumi, Georgia; Hard $15,000; Singles and doubles draws	(Russia) Yuliya Kalabina (Russia) Eugeniya Pashkova; 7–6^{(7–5)}, 6–1	(Ukraine) Alona Fomina (Ukraine) Anna Shkudun	(Russia) Yuliya Kalabina (Ukraine) Olga Ianchuk	(Georgia (country)) Ekaterine Gorgodze (Russia) Eugeniya Pashkova (Ukraine) Elizaveta Ianchuk (Georgia (country)) Sofia Kvatsabaia
September 17	Yoshkar-Ola, Russia; Hard $25,000; Singles and doubles draws	(Russia) Margarita Gasparyan; 7–5, 7–6^{(7–3)}	(Ukraine) Nadiia Kichenok	(Russia) Anastasia Frolova (Ukraine) Veronika Kapshay	(Estonia) Anett Kontaveit (Serbia) Tamara Čurović (Russia) Anastasiya Saitova (Russia) Valeria Solovyeva
September 17	Yoshkar-Ola, Russia; Hard $25,000; Singles and doubles draws	(Russia) Margarita Gasparyan (Ukraine) Veronika Kapshay; 6–4, 2–6, [11–9]	(Ukraine) Irina Buryachok (Russia) Valeria Solovyeva	(Russia) Anastasia Frolova (Ukraine) Veronika Kapshay	(Estonia) Anett Kontaveit (Serbia) Tamara Čurović (Russia) Anastasiya Saitova (Russia) Valeria Solovyeva
September 17	Antalya, Turkey; Hard $10,000; Singles and doubles draws	(Belgium) An-Sophie Mestach; 6–3, 6–2	(Japan) Yurina Koshino	(Chinese Taipei) Juan Ting-fei (Russia) Aminat Kushkhova	(Israel) Deniz Khazaniuk (Mexico) Carolina Betancourt (Ukraine) Marianna Zakarlyuk (Germany) Katharina Lehnert
September 17	Antalya, Turkey; Hard $10,000; Singles and doubles draws	(Japan) Yurina Koshino (Japan) Kanami Tsuji; 7–5, 6–2	(Chinese Taipei) Juan Ting-fei (Ukraine) Olena Kyrpot	(Chinese Taipei) Juan Ting-fei (Russia) Aminat Kushkhova	(Israel) Deniz Khazaniuk (Mexico) Carolina Betancourt (Ukraine) Marianna Zakarlyuk (Germany) Katharina Lehnert
September 17	Madrid, Spain; Clay $10,000; Singles and doubles draws	(Argentina) Tatiana Búa; 6–3, 7–5	(United Kingdom) Amanda Carreras	(Italy) Agnese Zucchini (Mexico) Ximena Hermoso	(Spain) Yvonne Cavallé Reimers (Spain) Olga Sáez Larra (Spain) Nuria Párrizas Díaz (Italy) Alice Savoretti
September 17	Madrid, Spain; Clay $10,000; Singles and doubles draws	(Argentina) Tatiana Búa (Spain) Lucía Cervera Vázquez; 3–6, 6–1, [10–7]	(Spain) Yvonne Cavallé Reimers (Spain) Isabel Rapisarda Calvo	(Italy) Agnese Zucchini (Mexico) Ximena Hermoso	(Spain) Yvonne Cavallé Reimers (Spain) Olga Sáez Larra (Spain) Nuria Párrizas Díaz (Italy) Alice Savoretti
September 17	Saint-Malo, France; Clay $25,000; Singles and doubles draws	(Ukraine) Maryna Zanevska; 6–2, 6–7^{(5–7)}, 6–0	(Spain) Estrella Cabeza Candela	(Spain) Arantxa Parra Santonja (Venezuela) Andrea Gámiz	(France) Laëtitia Sarrazin (Belgium) Alison Van Uytvanck (Spain) Eva Fernández Brugués (Bulgaria) Elitsa Kostova
September 17	Saint-Malo, France; Clay $25,000; Singles and doubles draws	(Turkey) Pemra Özgen (Ukraine) Alyona Sotnikova; 6–4, 7–6^{(8–6)}	(Bulgaria) Aleksandrina Naydenova (Brazil) Teliana Pereira	(Spain) Arantxa Parra Santonja (Venezuela) Andrea Gámiz	(France) Laëtitia Sarrazin (Belgium) Alison Van Uytvanck (Spain) Eva Fernández Brugués (Bulgaria) Elitsa Kostova
September 17	Bogotá, Colombia; Clay $10,000; Singles and doubles draws	(Chile) Cecilia Costa Melgar; 1–6, 6–3, 6–4	(Colombia) Yuliana Lizarazo	(Peru) Patricia Kú Flores (Kazakhstan) Kamila Kerimbayeva	(Colombia) María Fernanda Herazo (New Zealand) Emily Fanning (Ukraine) Anastasia Kharchenko (United States) Blair Shankle
September 17	Bogotá, Colombia; Clay $10,000; Singles and doubles draws	(Colombia) Yuliana Lizarazo (Brazil) Laura Pigossi; 6–2, 6–2	(United States) Blair Shankle (Colombia) Laura Ucrós	(Peru) Patricia Kú Flores (Kazakhstan) Kamila Kerimbayeva	(Colombia) María Fernanda Herazo (New Zealand) Emily Fanning (Ukraine) Anastasia Kharchenko (United States) Blair Shankle
September 17	Royal Cup NLB Montenegro; Podgorica, Montenegro; Clay $50,000; Singles – Doubles	(Czech Republic) Renata Voráčová; 3–6, 6–2, 6–0	(Italy) Maria Elena Camerin	(Austria) Yvonne Meusburger (Montenegro) Danka Kovinić	(Croatia) Tereza Mrdeža (Italy) Karin Knapp (Germany) Anna-Lena Friedsam (Germany) Anna Zaja
September 17	Royal Cup NLB Montenegro; Podgorica, Montenegro; Clay $50,000; Singles – Doubles	(Italy) Nicole Clerico (Germany) Anna Zaja; 4–6, 6–3, [11–9]	(Argentina) Mailen Auroux (Argentina) María Irigoyen	(Austria) Yvonne Meusburger (Montenegro) Danka Kovinić	(Croatia) Tereza Mrdeža (Italy) Karin Knapp (Germany) Anna-Lena Friedsam (Germany) Anna Zaja
September 17	Port Pirie, Australia; Hard $25,000; Singles and doubles draws	(Australia) Sacha Jones; 6–2, 7–5	(Australia) Olivia Rogowska	(South Africa) Chanel Simmonds (Slovakia) Zuzana Zlochová	(United States) Alexandra Stevenson (Japan) Mai Minokoshi (Australia) Rachael Tredoux (Japan) Misa Eguchi
September 17	Port Pirie, Australia; Hard $25,000; Singles and doubles draws	(Australia) Sacha Jones (Australia) Sally Peers; 6–4, 6–2	(Australia) Stephanie Bengson (South Africa) Chanel Simmonds	(South Africa) Chanel Simmonds (Slovakia) Zuzana Zlochová	(United States) Alexandra Stevenson (Japan) Mai Minokoshi (Australia) Rachael Tredoux (Japan) Misa Eguchi
September 17	Sharm el-Sheikh, Egypt; Hard $10,000; Singles and doubles draws	(Switzerland) Belinda Bencic; 6–3, 7–6^{(7–4)}	(Oman) Fatma Al Nabhani	(Austria) Barbara Haas (Egypt) Mai El Kamash	(Poland) Zuzanna Maciejewska (Poland) Olga Brózda (Germany) Laura Schaeder (Italy) Linda Mair
September 17	Sharm el-Sheikh, Egypt; Hard $10,000; Singles and doubles draws	(Switzerland) Belinda Bencic (France) Lou Brouleau; 7–6^{(7–3)}, 3–6, [10–6]	(Poland) Olga Brózda (Ukraine) Ganna Piven	(Austria) Barbara Haas (Egypt) Mai El Kamash	(Poland) Zuzanna Maciejewska (Poland) Olga Brózda (Germany) Laura Schaeder (Italy) Linda Mair
September 17	Villa Allende, Argentina; Clay $10,000; Singles and doubles draws	(Argentina) Catalina Pella; 3–6, 7–5, 7–6^{(7–4)}	(Chile) Camila Silva	(Argentina) Nadia Podoroska (Germany) Karolina Nowak	(Argentina) Carolina Zeballos (Argentina) Francesca Rescaldani (Mexico) Ana Sofía Sánchez (Argentina) Ornella Caron
September 17	Villa Allende, Argentina; Clay $10,000; Singles and doubles draws	(Argentina) Victoria Bosio (Argentina) Catalina Pella; 7–6^{(8–6)}, 6–7^{(3–7)}, [10–7]	(Argentina) Andrea Benítez (Argentina) Luciana Sarmenti	(Argentina) Nadia Podoroska (Germany) Karolina Nowak	(Argentina) Carolina Zeballos (Argentina) Francesca Rescaldani (Mexico) Ana Sofía Sánchez (Argentina) Ornella Caron
September 17	Izida Cup; Dobrich, Bulgaria; Clay $25,000; Singles and doubles draws	(Germany) Anne Schäfer; 6–2, 6–2	(Netherlands) Angelique van der Meet	(Poland) Magda Linette (Switzerland) Conny Perrin	(Bosnia and Herzegovina) Jasmina Tinjić (Romania) Laura-Ioana Andrei (Slovenia) Maša Zec Peškirič (Ukraine) Yuliya Beygelzimer
September 17	Izida Cup; Dobrich, Bulgaria; Clay $25,000; Singles and doubles draws	(Poland) Katarzyna Piter (Poland) Barbara Sobaszkiewicz; 6–2, 7–5	(Switzerland) Lisa Sabino (Germany) Anne Schäfer	(Poland) Magda Linette (Switzerland) Conny Perrin	(Bosnia and Herzegovina) Jasmina Tinjić (Romania) Laura-Ioana Andrei (Slovenia) Maša Zec Peškirič (Ukraine) Yuliya Beygelzimer
September 24	Party Rock Open; Las Vegas, United States; Hard $50,000; Singles – Doubles	(United States) Lauren Davis; 6–7^{(5–7)}, 6–2, 6–2	(United States) Shelby Rogers	(Venezuela) Adriana Pérez (Australia) Anastasia Rodionova	(United States) Jessica Pegula (Russia) Elena Bovina (Canada) Heidi El Tabakh (United States) Mallory Burdette
September 24	Party Rock Open; Las Vegas, United States; Hard $50,000; Singles – Doubles	(Australia) Anastasia Rodionova (Russia) Arina Rodionova; 6–2, 2–6, [10–6]	(Russia) Elena Bovina (Romania) Edina Gallovits-Hall	(Venezuela) Adriana Pérez (Australia) Anastasia Rodionova	(United States) Jessica Pegula (Russia) Elena Bovina (Canada) Heidi El Tabakh (United States) Mallory Burdette
September 24	Telavi Open; Telavi, Georgia; Clay $50,000; Singles – Doubles	(Ukraine) Elina Svitolina; 6–1, 6–2	(Ukraine) Lesia Tsurenko	(Serbia) Aleksandra Krunić (Ukraine) Anna Shkudun	(Germany) Anna-Lena Friedsam (Georgia (country)) Sofia Shapatava (Georgia (country)) Oksana Kalashnikova (Croatia) Tereza Mrdeža
September 24	Telavi Open; Telavi, Georgia; Clay $50,000; Singles – Doubles	(Hungary) Réka-Luca Jani (Germany) Christina Shakovets; 3–6, 6–4, [10–6]	(Belarus) Ekaterina Dzehalevich (Georgia (country)) Oksana Kalashnikova	(Serbia) Aleksandra Krunić (Ukraine) Anna Shkudun	(Germany) Anna-Lena Friedsam (Georgia (country)) Sofia Shapatava (Georgia (country)) Oksana Kalashnikova (Croatia) Tereza Mrdeža
September 24	Clermont-Ferrand, France; Hard $25,000; Singles and doubles draws	(Switzerland) Stefanie Vögele; 6–4, 6–1	(Germany) Tatjana Malek	(Croatia) Ana Vrljić (Serbia) Vesna Dolonc	(Italy) Anna Remondina (France) Julie Coin (United Kingdom) Lisa Whybourn (Luxembourg) Anne Kremer
September 24	Clermont-Ferrand, France; Hard $25,000; Singles and doubles draws	(Latvia) Diāna Marcinkēviča (Netherlands) Bibiane Schoofs; 6–3, 6–0	(United Kingdom) Samantha Murray (United Kingdom) Jade Windley	(Croatia) Ana Vrljić (Serbia) Vesna Dolonc	(Italy) Anna Remondina (France) Julie Coin (United Kingdom) Lisa Whybourn (Luxembourg) Anne Kremer
September 24	Madrid, Spain; Clay $10,000; Singles and doubles draws	(Bulgaria) Aleksandrina Naydenova; 6–0, 6–4	(France) Jade Suvrijn	(Italy) Agnese Zucchini (Spain) Rocío de la Torre Sánchez	(Spain) Yvonne Cavallé Reimers (Italy) Carolina Pillot (Italy) Annalisa Bona (Italy) Gaia Sanesi
September 24	Madrid, Spain; Clay $10,000; Singles and doubles draws	(Denmark) Malou Ejdesgaard (Bulgaria) Aleksandrina Naydenova; 5–7, 6–3, [10–3]	(Argentina) Tatiana Búa (Spain) Yvonne Cavallé Reimers	(Italy) Agnese Zucchini (Spain) Rocío de la Torre Sánchez	(Spain) Yvonne Cavallé Reimers (Italy) Carolina Pillot (Italy) Annalisa Bona (Italy) Gaia Sanesi
September 24	Amelia Island, United States; Clay $10,000; Singles and doubles draws	(United States) Jamie Loeb; 6–3, 7–5	(Japan) Mari Osaka	(Japan) Naomi Osaka (Bolivia) María Fernanda Álvarez Terán	(Italy) Federica Grazioso (United States) Kelsey Laurente (United States) Maria Shishkina (United States) Katerina Stewart
September 24	Amelia Island, United States; Clay $10,000; Singles and doubles draws	(Bolivia) María Fernanda Álvarez Terán (Brazil) Maria Fernanda Alves; 6–2, 6–2	(United States) Elizabeth Ferris (Ukraine) Anastasia Kharchenko	(Japan) Naomi Osaka (Bolivia) María Fernanda Álvarez Terán	(Italy) Federica Grazioso (United States) Kelsey Laurente (United States) Maria Shishkina (United States) Katerina Stewart
September 24	Prague, Czech Republic; Clay $10,000; Singles and doubles draws	(Poland) Magda Linette; 6–2, 7–6^{(9–7)}	(Slovakia) Zuzana Luknárová	(Italy) Angelica Moratelli (Czech Republic) Pernilla Mendesová	(Czech Republic) Kateřina Siniaková (Russia) Anastasiya Komardina (Czech Republic) Tereza Martincová (Czech Republic) Barbora Krejčíková
September 24	Prague, Czech Republic; Clay $10,000; Singles and doubles draws	(United Kingdom) Lucy Brown (Italy) Angelica Moratelli; 6–3, 5–7, [10–6]	(Czech Republic) Kateřina Kramperová (Poland) Magda Linette	(Italy) Angelica Moratelli (Czech Republic) Pernilla Mendesová	(Czech Republic) Kateřina Siniaková (Russia) Anastasiya Komardina (Czech Republic) Tereza Martincová (Czech Republic) Barbora Krejčíková
September 24	Sharm el-Sheikh, Egypt; Hard $10,000; Singles and doubles draws	(Switzerland) Belinda Bencic; 6–4, 6–0	(Austria) Barbara Haas	(Belarus) Lidziya Marozava (Oman) Fatma Al Nabhani	(Poland) Zuzanna Maciejewska (Austria) Tina Schiechtl (Germany) Laura Schaeder (Russia) Yana Sizikova
September 24	Sharm el-Sheikh, Egypt; Hard $10,000; Singles and doubles draws	(Poland) Olga Brózda (China) Lu Jiaxiang; 7–5, 6–2	(Oman) Fatma Al Nabhani (Belarus) Lidziya Marozava	(Belarus) Lidziya Marozava (Oman) Fatma Al Nabhani	(Poland) Zuzanna Maciejewska (Austria) Tina Schiechtl (Germany) Laura Schaeder (Russia) Yana Sizikova
September 24	Antalya, Turkey; Clay $10,000; Singles and doubles draws	(Serbia) Jovana Jakšić; 7–5, 7–5	(Czech Republic) Zuzana Zálabská	(Romania) Diana Buzean (Ukraine) Vladyslava Zanosiyenko	(Italy) Martina di Giuseppi (Japan) Yurina Koshino (Sweden) Matilda Hamlin (Russia) Varvara Flink
September 24	Antalya, Turkey; Clay $10,000; Singles and doubles draws	(France) Anaïs Laurendon (Czech Republic) Kateřina Vaňková; 7–5, 6–3	(Romania) Diana Buzean (Romania) Bianca Hîncu	(Romania) Diana Buzean (Ukraine) Vladyslava Zanosiyenko	(Italy) Martina di Giuseppi (Japan) Yurina Koshino (Sweden) Matilda Hamlin (Russia) Varvara Flink
September 24	Varna, Bulgaria; Clay $10,000; Singles and doubles draws	(Bulgaria) Viktoriya Tomova; 6–1, 6–4	(Ukraine) Anastasiya Vasylyeva	(Romania) Gabriela Talabă (Romania) Patricia Maria Țig	(Bulgaria) Radina Dimitrova (Romania) Raluca Elena Platon (Switzerland) Lisa Sabino (Romania) Alexandra Damaschin
September 24	Varna, Bulgaria; Clay $10,000; Singles and doubles draws	(Belgium) Michaela Boev (Ukraine) Anastasiya Vasylyeva; 6–1, 7–5	(Bulgaria) Borislava Botusharova (Bulgaria) Viktoriya Tomova	(Romania) Gabriela Talabă (Romania) Patricia Maria Țig	(Bulgaria) Radina Dimitrova (Romania) Raluca Elena Platon (Switzerland) Lisa Sabino (Romania) Alexandra Damaschin
September 24	Gulbarga, India; Hard $10,000; Singles and doubles draws	(India) Prerna Bhambri; 6–2, 6–2	(China) Yang Zi	(Hong Kong) Venise Chan (China) Zhang Nannan	(Ukraine) Oleksandra Korashvili (India) Sri Peddi Reddy (India) Rushmi Chakravarthi (United Kingdom) Emily Webley-Smith
September 24	Gulbarga, India; Hard $10,000; Singles and doubles draws	(South Korea) Kim Hae-sung (South Korea) Kim Ju-eun; 6–1, 6–1	(Chinese Taipei) Lee Pei-chi (Chinese Taipei) Yang Chia-hsien	(Hong Kong) Venise Chan (China) Zhang Nannan	(Ukraine) Oleksandra Korashvili (India) Sri Peddi Reddy (India) Rushmi Chakravarthi (United Kingdom) Emily Webley-Smith
