= 2011 Open 88 Contrexéville – Singles =

Singles
- 2011 Open 88 Contrexéville

Final
- Champions: (France) Iryna Brémond
- Runners-up: (France) Stéphanie Foretz Gacon
- Score: 6–4, 6–7^{(1–7)}, 6–2

Events
Singles	Doubles
← 2010 ·	Open 88 Contrexéville	· 2012 →

Jelena Dokić was the defending champion, but chose not to participate.
Iryna Brémond defeated Stéphanie Foretz Gacon in the final 6–4, 6–7^{(1–7)}, 6–2.

== Seeds ==
1. (Netherlands) Arantxa Rus (quarterfinals)
2. (Romania) Edina Gallovits-Hall (semifinals)
3. (France) Stéphanie Foretz Gacon (final)
4. (Czech Republic) Renata Voráčová (semifinals)
5. (France) Iryna Brémond (champion)
6. (Russia) Valeria Savinykh (second round)
7. (Poland) Urszula Radwańska (quarterfinals)
8. (Japan) Erika Sema (quarterfinals)

== Main draw ==
=== Key ===
- Q = Qualifier
- WC = Wild card
- LL = Lucky loser
- Alt = Alternate
- SE = Special exempt
- PR = Protected ranking
- ITF = ITF entry
- JE = Junior exempt
- w/o = Walkover
- r = Retired
- d = Defaulted
- SR = Special ranking

=== Finals ===
Semifinals
5	(France) Iryna Brémond	7^{7}	3	7^{7}
4	(Czech Republic) Renata Voráčová	6^{4}	6	6^{5}
3	(France) Stéphanie Foretz Gacon	5	7	6
2	(Romania) Edina Gallovits-Hall	7	5	3

Final
5	(France) Iryna Brémond	6	6^{1}	6
3	(France) Stéphanie Foretz Gacon	4	7^{7}	2

=== Top half ===
First round
1	(Netherlands) A Rus	6	6
(Germany) A-L Grönefeld	3	2
Q	(France) E Cascino	6	3	5
(Brazil) R Vaisemberg	3	6	7
(Romania) IR Olaru	3	2
(Ukraine) V Ivakhnenko	6	6
(Switzerland) A Sadiković	6	3	0
5	(France) I Brémond	4	6	6
4	(Czech Republic) R Voráčová	6	6
WC	(France) M Pons	1	0
WC	(France) A Pain	1	6	6
(Belarus) P Pekhova	6	0	4
(Netherlands) K Bertens	6	1	6
WC	(France) M Gaud	1	6	3
Q	(France) C Cattaneo	4	6	1
8	(Japan) E Sema	6	3	6

Second round
1	(Netherlands) A Rus	6	6
(Brazil) R Vaisemberg	0	3
(Ukraine) V Ivakhnenko	7	4	4
5	(France) I Brémond	5	6	6
4	(Czech Republic) R Voráčová	6	6
WC	(France) A Pain	2	0
(Netherlands) K Bertens	3	4
8	(Japan) E Sema	6	6

Quarterfinals
1	(Netherlands) A Rus	3	6^{3}
5	(France) I Brémond	6	7^{7}
4	(Czech Republic) R Voráčová	6	6
8	(Japan) E Sema	0	0

Semifinals
5	(France) I Brémond	7^{7}	3	7^{7}
4	(Czech Republic) R Voráčová	6^{4}	6	6^{5}

=== Bottom half ===
First round
6	(Russia) V Savinykh	6	6
(Bulgaria) E Kostova	1	2
Q	(France) J Ginier	6	0	4
(Germany) N Zander	1	6	6
(Ukraine) K Kozlova	6	2	6
(Uzbekistan) V Ekshibarova	0	6	2
LL	(France) F Gervais	2	1
3	(France) S Foretz Gacon	6	6
7	(Poland) U Radwańska	6	6
(France) C Feuerstein	0	2
Q	(Croatia) I Akiki	3	1
WC	(France) E Guisard	6	6
(France) N Piquion	2	2
(Bulgaria) I Shinikova	6	6
(Germany) T Malek	6	5	6^{4}
2	(Romania) E Gallovits-Hall	2	7	7^{7}

Second round
6	(Russia) V Savinykh	6	1	3
(Germany) N Zander	4	6	6
(Ukraine) K Kozlova	6	0	3
3	(France) S Foretz Gacon	3	6	6
7	(Poland) U Radwańska	6	6
WC	(France) E Guisard	4	1
(Bulgaria) I Shinikova	5	1
2	(Romania) E Gallovits-Hall	7	6

Quarterfinals
(Germany) N Zander	3	1
3	(France) S Foretz Gacon	6	6
7	(Poland) U Radwańska	6	3	5
2	(Romania) E Gallovits-Hall	2	6	7

Semifinals
3	(France) S Foretz Gacon	5	7	6
2	(Romania) E Gallovits-Hall	7	5	3
