= 2011 Open 88 Contrexéville =

- Date: 11–17 July
- Edition: 5th
- Location: Contrexéville, France

Champions

Singles
- (France) Iryna Brémond

Doubles
- (Ukraine) Valentyna Ivakhnenko / (Ukraine) Kateryna Kozlova
← 2010 ·	Open 88 Contrexéville	· 2012 →

The 2011 Open 88 Contrexéville was a professional tennis tournament played on clay courts. It was the 5th edition of the tournament which was part of the 2011 ITF Women's Circuit. It took place in Contrexéville, France between 11 and 17 July 2011.

== WTA entrants ==
=== Seeds ===
Country	Player	Rank^{1}	Seed
NED	Arantxa Rus	80	1
ROU	Edina Gallovits-Hall	121	2
FRA	Stéphanie Foretz Gacon	124	3
CZE	Renata Voráčová	128	4
FRA	Iryna Brémond	133	5
RUS	Valeria Savinykh	134	6
POL	Urszula Radwańska	138	7
JPN	Erika Sema	147	8

- ^{1} Rankings are as of July 4, 2011.

=== Other entrants ===
The following players received wildcards into the singles main draw:

- (France) Marion Gaud
- (France) Estelle Guisard
- (France) Anaeve Pain
- (France) Morgane Pons

The following players received entry from the qualifying draw:

- (Croatia) Indire Akiki
- (France) Estelle Cascino
- (France) Céline Cattaneo
- (France) Jessica Ginier

The following players received entry by a lucky loser spot:

- (France) Fiona Gervais

== Champions ==
=== Singles ===
(France) Iryna Brémond def. (France) Stéphanie Foretz Gacon, 6–4, 6–7^{(1–7)}, 6–2

=== Doubles ===
(Ukraine) Valentyna Ivakhnenko / (Ukraine) Kateryna Kozlova def. (Japan) Erika Sema / (Brazil) Roxane Vaisemberg, 2–6, 7–5, [12–10]
