= 2011 Open 88 Contrexéville – Doubles =

Doubles
- 2011 Open 88 Contrexéville

Final
- Champions: (Ukraine) Valentyna Ivakhnenko (Ukraine) Kateryna Kozlova
- Runners-up: (Japan) Erika Sema (Brazil) Roxane Vaisemberg
- Score: 2–6, 7–5, [12–10]

Events
Singles	Doubles
← 2010 ·	Open 88 Contrexéville	· 2012 →

Nina Bratchikova and Ekaterina Ivanova were the defending champions, but both chose not to participate. Valentyna Ivakhnenko and Kateryna Kozlova defeated Erika Sema and Roxane Vaisemberg in the final, 2–6, 7–5, [12–10].

== Seeds ==
1. (Germany) Anna-Lena Grönefeld / (Germany) Tatjana Malek (semifinals)
2. (France) Claire Feuerstein / (Russia) Valeria Savinykh (quarterfinals)
3. (Netherlands) Kiki Bertens / (Netherlands) Arantxa Rus (semifinals)
4. (Japan) Erika Sema / (Brazil) Roxane Vaisemberg (final)

== Draw ==
=== Key ===
- Q = Qualifier
- WC = Wild card
- LL = Lucky loser
- Alt = Alternate
- SE = Special exempt
- PR = Protected ranking
- ITF = ITF entry
- JE = Junior exempt
- w/o = Walkover
- r = Retired
- d = Defaulted
- SR = Special ranking

=== Draw ===
First round
(Switzerland) A Sadiković (Bulgaria) I Shinikova	5	6	[10]
(Czech Republic) Iveta Gerlová (Czech Republic) Lucie Kriegsmannová	7	3	[8]
4	(Japan) E Sema (Brazil) R Vaisemberg	6	6
(Italy) C Coppola (Italy) S Sussarello	1	0
(Uzbekistan) V Ekshibarova (Belarus) L Marozava	5	7	[10]
(Switzerland) V Golubic (Germany) N Zander	7	5	[7]
(France) I Brémond (Belarus) P Pekhova	6
(Croatia) I Akiki (France) E Cascino	1^{r}
(France) S Gauvain (France) A Pain	0	3
(Ukraine) V Ivakhnenko (Ukraine) K Kozlova	6	6

Quarterfinals
1	(Germany) A-L Grönefeld (Germany) T Malek	7	6
(Switzerland) A Sadiković (Bulgaria) I Shinikova	5	2
4	(Japan) E Sema (Brazil) R Vaisemberg	6	6
(Uzbekistan) V Ekshibarova (Belarus) L Marozava	2	3
(France) I Brémond (Belarus) P Pekhova	2	5
3	(Netherlands) K Bertens (Netherlands) A Rus	6	7
(Ukraine) V Ivakhnenko (Ukraine) K Kozlova	7^{7}	6
2	(France) C Feuerstein (Russia) V Savinykh	6^{3}	3

Semifinals
1	(Germany) A-L Grönefeld (Germany) T Malek	5	3
4	(Japan) E Sema (Brazil) R Vaisemberg	7	6
3	(Netherlands) K Bertens (Netherlands) A Rus	3	2
(Ukraine) V Ivakhnenko (Ukraine) K Kozlova	6	6

Finals
4	(Japan) E Sema (Brazil) R Vaisemberg	6	5	[10]
(Ukraine) V Ivakhnenko (Ukraine) K Kozlova	2	7	[12]
