= 2012 Open 88 Contrexéville – Doubles =

Doubles
- 2012 Open 88 Contrexéville

Final
- Champions: (Ukraine) Yuliya Beygelzimer (Czech Republic) Renata Voráčová
- Runners-up: (Croatia) Tereza Mrdeža (Croatia) Silvia Njirić
- Score: 6–1, 6–1

Events
| Singles | Doubles |
| ← 2011 · | Open 88 Contrexéville | · 2013 → |

Valentyna Ivakhnenko and Kateryna Kozlova were the defending champions, but they chose to participate in Donetsk.

Yuliya Beygelzimer and Renata Voráčová won the title defeating Tereza Mrdeža and Silvia Njirić in the final 6–1, 6–1.

== Seeds ==
1. (Germany) Kristina Barrois / (France) Kristina Mladenovic (semifinals)
2. (France) Séverine Brémond / (France) Laura Thorpe (quarterfinals, withdrew)
3. (Ukraine) Yuliya Beygelzimer / (Czech Republic) Renata Voráčová (champions)
4. (Liechtenstein) Stephanie Vogt / (Poland) Sandra Zaniewska (semifinals)

== Draw ==
=== Key ===
- Q = Qualifier
- WC = Wild card
- LL = Lucky loser
- Alt = Alternate
- SE = Special exempt
- PR = Protected ranking
- ITF = ITF entry
- JE = Junior exempt
- w/o = Walkover
- r = Retired
- d = Defaulted
- SR = Special ranking

=== Draw ===
First round
(France) M Maietti (Serbia) E Mikulčić | 6 | 1 | [6]
(Venezuela) MA Cárdenas (Italy) G Sussarello | 4 | 6 | [10]
(Russia) N Gorbachkova (Russia) A Rafikova | 2 | 0
WC | (Russia) A Rudakova (France) C Seateun | 6 | 6
(Croatia) I Akiki (Germany) A-L Friedsam | 6 | 6
(Switzerland) V Golubic (Germany) D Raickovic | 4 | 3
(France) E Lechemia (Russia) A Romanova | 4 | 5
(Croatia) T Mrdeža (Croatia) S Njirić | 6 | 7

Quarterfinals
1 | (Germany) K Barrois (France) K Mladenovic | 6 | 6
(Venezuela) MA Cárdenas (Italy) G Sussarello | 1 | 0
3 | (Ukraine) Y Beygelzimer (Czech Republic) R Voráčová | 6 | 6
WC | (Russia) A Rudakova (France) C Seateun | 0 | 2
(Croatia) I Akiki (Germany) A-L Friedsam | 3 | 6 | [6]
4 | (Liechtenstein) S Vogt (Poland) S Zaniewska | 6 | 4 | [10]
(Croatia) T Mrdeža (Croatia) S Njirić | w/o
2 | (France) S Brémond (France) L Thorpe

Semifinals
1 | (Germany) K Barrois (France) K Mladenovic | 2 | 6 | [4]
3 | (Ukraine) Y Beygelzimer (Czech Republic) R Voráčová | 6 | 3 | [10]
4 | (Liechtenstein) S Vogt (Poland) S Zaniewska | 6 | 4 | [7]
(Croatia) T Mrdeža (Croatia) S Njirić | 3 | 6 | [10]

Finals
3 | (Ukraine) Y Beygelzimer (Czech Republic) R Voráčová | 6 | 6
(Croatia) T Mrdeža (Croatia) S Njirić | 1 | 1
