= 2012 Open 88 Contrexéville – Singles =

Singles
- 2012 Open 88 Contrexéville

Final
- Champion: (France) Aravane Rezaï
- Runner-up: (Austria) Yvonne Meusburger
- Score: 6–3, 2–6, 6–3

Events
Singles	Doubles
← 2011 ·	Open 88 Contrexéville	· 2013 →

Iryna Brémond was the defending champion, but chose not to participate.

Aravane Rezaï won the title defeating Yvonne Meusburger in the final 6–3, 2–6, 6–3.

== Seeds ==
1. (Austria) Yvonne Meusburger (final)
2. (France) Aravane Rezaï (champion)
3. (Poland) Sandra Zaniewska (quarterfinals)
4. (France) Kristina Mladenovic (semifinals)
5. (Bulgaria) Dia Evtimova (first round)
6. (Ukraine) Yuliya Beygelzimer (quarterfinals)
7. (Belgium) Kirsten Flipkens (semifinals)
8. (Croatia) Tereza Mrdeža (first round)

== Draw ==
=== Key ===
- Q = Qualifier
- WC = Wild card
- LL = Lucky loser
- Alt = Alternate
- SE = Special exempt
- PR = Protected ranking
- ITF = ITF entry
- JE = Junior exempt
- w/o = Walkover
- r = Retired
- d = Defaulted
- SR = Special ranking

=== Finals ===
Semifinals
1	(Austria) Yvonne Meusburger	1	6	7
4	(France) Kristina Mladenovic	6	3	5
7	(Belgium) Kirsten Flipkens	7^{7}	2	6^{2}
2	(France) Aravane Rezaï	6^{5}	6	7^{7}

Final
1	(Austria) Yvonne Meusburger	3	6	3
2	(France) Aravane Rezaï	6	2	6

=== Top half ===
First round
1	(Austria) Y Meusburger	6	7^{7}
Q	(Russia) D Salnikova	4	6^{4}
(France) A Hesse	7	5	4
Q	(Croatia) E Mikulčić	5	7	6
Q	(France) C Seateun	6	6
(Croatia) S Njirić	3	4
(Germany) A-L Friedsam	6	6^{6}	6
5	(Bulgaria) D Evtimova	2	7^{8}	2
4	(France) K Mladenovic	6	4	6
(Poland) P Sanduska	1	6	1
WC	(France) A Pain	3	3
(France) S Beltrame	6	6
(Croatia) I Akiki	3	1
(Germany) K Wörle	6	6
(Latvia) A Sevastova	4	6	6
8	(Croatia) T Mrdeža	6	3	4

Second round
1	(Austria) Y Meusburger	6	6
Q	(Croatia) E Mikulčić	3	1
Q	(France) C Seateun	6	6
(Germany) A-L Friedsam	1	3
4	(France) K Mladenovic	6	6
(France) S Beltrame	3	3
(Germany) K Wörle	6	6
(Latvia) A Sevastova	4	3

Quarterfinals
1	(Austria) Y Meusburger	6	2	6
Q	(France) C Seateun	4	6	3
4	(France) K Mladenovic	7	6
(Germany) K Wörle	5	3

Semifinals
1	(Austria) Y Meusburger	1	6	7
4	(France) K Mladenovic	6	3	5

=== Bottom half ===
First round
7	(Belgium) K Flipkens	6	6
(Russia) A Romanova	2	1
(France) C Sibille	6	7^{7}
Q	(France) V Ayassamy	2	6^{2}
WC	(France) E Lechemia	2	3
WC	(France) C Cattaneo	6	6
(Spain) L Costas	6^{5}	0^{r}
3	(Poland) S Zaniewska	7^{7}	2
6	(Ukraine) Y Beygelzimer	6	6
(Argentina) C Pella	3	1
(France) M Georges	6	7
(France) L Thorpe	3	5
(Czech Republic) R Voráčová	7^{8}	4	6^{5}
(Liechtenstein) S Vogt	6^{6}	6	7^{7}
(Germany) K Barrois	4	6^{6}
2	(France) A Rezaï	6	7^{8}

Second round
7	(Belgium) K Flipkens	6	6
(France) C Sibille	1	4
WC	(France) C Cattaneo	1	4
3	(Poland) S Zaniewska	6	6
6	(Ukraine) Y Beygelzimer	6	6
(France) M Georges	1	4
(Liechtenstein) S Vogt	5	2
2	(France) A Rezaï	7	6

Quarterfinals
7	(Belgium) K Flipkens	6	6
3	(Poland) S Zaniewska	3	2
6	(Ukraine) Y Beygelzimer	7	2	1
2	(France) A Rezaï	5	6	6

Semifinals
7	(Belgium) K Flipkens	7^{7}	2	6^{2}
2	(France) A Rezaï	6^{5}	6	7^{7}
