= 2012 Open 88 Contrexéville =

- Date: July 16–22
- Edition: 6th
- Surface: Clay – Outdoor
- Location: Contrexéville, France

Champions

Singles
- (France) Aravane Rezaï

Doubles
- (Ukraine) Yuliya Beygelzimer / (Czech Republic) Renata Voráčová
← 2011 ·	Open 88 Contrexéville	· 2013 →

The 2012 Open 88 Contrexéville was a professional tennis tournament played on outdoor clay courts. It was the 6th edition of the tournament and was part of the 2012 ITF Women's Circuit. It took place in Contrexéville, France between 16 and 22 July 2012.

== WTA entrants ==
=== Seeds ===
Country	Player	Rank^{1}	Seed
AUT	Yvonne Meusburger	131	1
FRA	Aravane Rezaï	138	2
POL	Sandra Zaniewska	151	3
FRA	Kristina Mladenovic	154	4
BUL	Dia Evtimova	158	5
UKR	Yuliya Beygelzimer	166	6
BEL	Kirsten Flipkens	172	7
CRO	Tereza Mrdeža	194	8

- Rankings are as of July 9, 2012.

=== Other entrants ===
The following players received wildcards into the singles main draw:

- (France) Céline Cattaneo
- (France) Elixane Lechemia
- (France) Anaève Pain

The following players received entry from the qualifying draw:

- (France) Virginie Ayassamy
- (Croatia) Ema Mikulčić
- (Russia) Daria Salnikova
- (France) Charlène Seateun

== Champions ==
=== Singles ===
- (France) Aravane Rezaï def. (Austria) Yvonne Meusburger, 6–3, 2–6, 6–3

=== Doubles ===
- (Ukraine) Yuliya Beygelzimer / (Czech Republic) Renata Voráčová def. (Croatia) Tereza Mrdeža / (Croatia) Silvia Njirić, 6–1, 6–1
