= Estelle Guisard =

French tennis player

- Country (sports): France
- Born: 5 April 1989 (age 35)
- Turned pro: 2005
- Retired: 2015
- Plays: Right-handed

Estelle Guisard Diemer (born 5 April 1989) is a former professional tennis player and tennis coach from the France. On 5 July 2010, she reached her highest WTA singles ranking of 228.

== Tennis career ==
She has won 8 singles and 2 doubles titles on the ITF Women's Circuit. In 2012, Guisard won her singles title in Turin defeating Italianwoman Angelica Moratelli.

In 2005, she played in the final of the France Junior Fed Cup.

Guisard retirement from tennis in 2015. In 2017 Guisard Working as ASM Belfort tennis coach.

== National representation ==
=== Junior Fed Cup: 1 (1 loss) ===
Result	Date	Tournament	Surface	Partners	Opponents	Score
Loss	Oct 2005	Junior Fed Cup, Barcelona, Spain	Clay	(France) Alizé Cornet (France) Noémie Scharle	(Poland) Urszula Radwańska (Poland) Agnieszka Radwańska (Poland) Maksymiliana Wandel	0–2
