= 2013 Open 88 Contrexéville – Doubles =

Doubles
- 2013 Open 88 Contrexéville

Final
- Champions: (Argentina) Vanesa Furlanetto (France) Amandine Hesse
- Runners-up: (Croatia) Ana Konjuh (Croatia) Silvia Njirić
- Score: 7–6^{(7–3)}, 6–4

Events
Singles	Doubles
← 2012 ·	Open 88 Contrexéville	· 2014 →

Yuliya Beygelzimer and Renata Voráčová were the defending champions, having won the event in 2012, but both players chose not to defend their title.

Vanesa Furlanetto and Amandine Hesse won the tournament, defeating Ana Konjuh and Silvia Njirić in the final, 7–6^{(7–3)}, 6–4.

== Seeds ==
1. (France) Yuliya Kalabina / (Georgia (country)) Sofia Shapatava (quarterfinals)
2. (Venezuela) María Andrea Cárdenas / (Switzerland) Amra Sadiković (quarterfinals)
3. (Argentina) Vanesa Furlanetto / (France) Amandine Hesse (champions)
4. (Russia) Daria Salnikova / (Mexico) Marcela Zacarías (quarterfinals)

== Draw ==
=== Key ===
- Q = Qualifier
- WC = Wild card
- LL = Lucky loser
- Alt = Alternate
- SE = Special exempt
- PR = Protected ranking
- ITF = ITF entry
- JE = Junior exempt
- w/o = Walkover
- r = Retired
- d = Defaulted
- SR = Special ranking

First round
(Croatia) A Konjuh (Croatia) S Njirić	6	6
(Russia) M Katsitadze (Ukraine) S Kovalets	4	2
(Russia) J Kushnereva (Russia) A Rafikova	1	0
(France) I Ramialison (France) C Sibille	6	6

Quarterfinals
1	(Russia) Y Kalabina (Georgia (country)) S Shapatava	1	2
(Germany) C Daniels (Germany) A Klasen	6	6
4	(Russia) D Salnikova (Mexico) M Zacarías	4	2
(Croatia) A Konjuh (Croatia) S Njirić	6	6
(France) I Ramialison (France) C Sibille	2	6	[12]
3	(Argentina) V Furlanetto (France) A Hesse	6	1	[14]
(France) M Arcangioli (France) L Sarrazin	6	6
2	(Venezuela) MA Cárdenas (Switzerland) A Sadiković	2	3

Semifinals
(Germany) C Daniels (Germany) A Klasen	4	6	[5]
(Croatia) A Konjuh (Croatia) S Njirić	6	3	[10]
3	(Argentina) V Furlanetto (France) A Hesse	7^{7}	3	[10]
(France) M Arcangioli (France) L Sarrazin	6^{4}	6	[8]

Final
(Croatia) A Konjuh (Croatia) S Njirić	6^{3}	4
3	(Argentina) V Furlanetto (France) A Hesse	7^{7}	6
