= 2013 Open 88 Contrexéville – Singles =

Singles
- 2013 Open 88 Contrexéville

Final
- Champion: (Switzerland) Timea Bacsinszky
- Runner-up: (Spain) Beatriz García Vidagany
- Score: 6–1, 6–1

Events
Singles	Doubles
← 2012 ·	Open 88 Contrexéville	· 2014 →

Aravane Rezaï was the defending champion, having won the event in 2012, but she chose not to defend her title.

Timea Bacsinszky won the tournament, defeating Beatriz García Vidagany in the final, 6–1, 6–1.

== Seeds ==
1. (France) Claire Feuerstein (quarterfinals)
2. (Germany) Anna-Lena Friedsam (second round)
3. (Germany) Anne Schäfer (second round)
4. (Switzerland) Timea Bacsinszky (champion)
5. (Tunisia) Ons Jabeur (first round)
6. (Georgia (country)) Sofia Shapatava (first round)
7. (Switzerland) Amra Sadiković (first round)
8. (Netherlands) Angelique van der Meet (quarterfinals)

== Main draw ==
=== Key ===
- Q = Qualifier
- WC = Wild card
- LL = Lucky loser
- Alt = Alternate
- SE = Special exempt
- PR = Protected ranking
- ITF = ITF entry
- JE = Junior exempt
- w/o = Walkover
- r = Retired
- d = Defaulted
- SR = Special ranking

=== Finals ===
Semifinals
(France) Constance Sibille	1	1
4	(Switzerland) Timea Bacsinszky	6	6
(Spain) Beatriz García Vidagany	7	6^{5}	6
JE	(Croatia) Ana Konjuh	5	7^{7}	4

Final
4	(Switzerland) Timea Bacsinszky	6	6
(Spain) Beatriz García Vidagany	1	1

=== Top half ===
First round
1	(France) C Feuerstein	6	1	6
(Ukraine) S Kovalets	3	6	1
Q	(Croatia) S Njirić	7^{7}	2	6
(Russia) M Katsitadze	6^{3}	6	3
(Russia) Y Kalabina	7	1	4
(Argentina) V Furlanetto	5	6	6
(France) C Sibille	6	2	6
5	(Tunisia) O Jabeur	2	6	4
4	(Switzerland) T Bacsinszky	6	6
Q	(Germany) N Zander	2	1
(France) M Arcangioli	6	6
Q	(France) A Collombon	0	2
(Germany) C Daniels	6	6
(Italy) G Gatto-Monticone	3	4
WC	(France) F Ferro	7^{7}	6
7	(Switzerland) A Sadiković	6^{3}	1

Second round
1	(France) C Feuerstein	6	6
Q	(Croatia) S Njirić	2	3
(Argentina) V Furlanetto	5	3
(France) C Sibille	7	6
4	(Switzerland) T Bacsinszky	7	6
(France) M Arcangioli	5	2
(Germany) C Daniels	4	3
WC	(France) F Ferro	6	6

Quarterfinals
1	(France) C Feuerstein	4	6^{6}
(France) C Sibille	6	7^{8}
4	(Switzerland) T Bacsinszky	6	6
WC	(France) F Ferro	2	0

Semifinals
(France) C Sibille	1	1
4	(Switzerland) T Bacsinszky	6	6

=== Bottom half ===
First round
6	(Georgia (country)) S Shapatava	4	5
(Spain) B García Vidagany	6	7
(Mexico) M Zacarías	6	6
(France) L Sarrazin	0	2
(Poland) S Zaniewska	6	7^{7}
(France) A Hesse	3	6^{3}
WC	(France) O Adam	0	0^{r}
3	(Germany) A Schäfer	6	4
8	(Netherlands) A van der Meet	6	6
(France) I Ramialison	3	2
(Russia) N Orlova	4	6	1
Q	(Netherlands) L van Riet	6	2	6
JE	(Croatia) A Konjuh	6	6
WC	(France) A Pain	2	1
WC	(France) V Muntean	2	4
2	(Germany) A-L Friedsam	6	6

Second round
(Spain) B García Vidagany	6	6
(Mexico) M Zacarías	4	1
(Poland) S Zaniewska	6	6
3	(Germany) A Schäfer	4	4
8	(Netherlands) A van der Meet	6	6
Q	(Netherlands) L van Riet	1	4
JE	(Croatia) A Konjuh	4	6	7
2	(Germany) A-L Friedsam	6	2	5

Quarterfinals
(Spain) B García Vidagany	7^{10}	6
(Poland) S Zaniewska	6^{8}	2
8	(Netherlands) A van der Meet	1	1
JE	(Croatia) A Konjuh	6	6

Semifinals
(Spain) B García Vidagany	7	6^{5}	6
JE	(Croatia) A Konjuh	5	7^{7}	4
