= 2016 Engie Open de Cagnes-sur-Mer Alpes-Maritimes – Doubles =

Doubles
- 2016 Engie Open de Cagnes-sur-Mer Alpes-Maritimes

Final
- Champions: (Romania) Andreea Mitu (Netherlands) Demi Schuurs
- Runners-up: (Switzerland) Xenia Knoll (Serbia) Aleksandra Krunić
- Score: 6–4, 7–5

Events
Singles	Doubles
← 2015 ·	Engie Open de Cagnes-sur-Mer Alpes-Maritimes	· 2017 →

Johanna Konta and Laura Thorpe were the defending champions, but Thorpe chose not to participate, whilst Konta chose to participate in Madrid instead.

Andreea Mitu and Demi Schuurs won the title, defeating Xenia Knoll and Aleksandra Krunić in the final, 6–4, 7–5.

== Seeds ==
1. (United Kingdom) Jocelyn Rae / (United Kingdom) Anna Smith (first round)
2. (Poland) Klaudia Jans-Ignacik / (Czech Republic) Renata Voráčová (semifinals)
3. (Switzerland) Xenia Knoll / (Serbia) Aleksandra Krunić (final)
4. (Romania) Andreea Mitu / (Netherlands) Demi Schuurs (champions)

== Draw ==
=== Key ===
- Q = Qualifier
- WC = Wild card
- LL = Lucky loser
- Alt = Alternate
- SE = Special exempt
- PR = Protected ranking
- ITF = ITF entry
- JE = Junior exempt
- w/o = Walkover
- r = Retired
- d = Defaulted
- SR = Special ranking

First round
1	(United Kingdom) J Rae (United Kingdom) A Smith	6	2	[6]
(France) V Muntean (Russia) N Vikhlyantseva	2	6	[10]
(France) F Ferro (France) M Témin
(Argentina) T Búa (Austria) S Klemenschits	w/o
3	(Switzerland) X Knoll (Serbia) A Krunić	w/o
(Spain) Y Cavallé Reimers (Spain) O Sáez Larra
(France) F Caramaro (France) A van Cauter	2	2
(France) A Hesse (Luxembourg) M Minella	6	6
(Kazakhstan) Z Diyas (Ukraine) M Zanevska	7	7
(Uzbekistan) A Amanmuradova (Belarus) L Marozava	5	5
(Russia) A Pivovarova (India) P Thombare	3	3
4	(Romania) A Mitu (Netherlands) D Schuurs	6	6
(France) E Cascino (France) M Partaud	3	0
(France) M Arcangioli (Brazil) B Haddad Maia	6	6
(France) I Ramialison (France) C Sibille	2	1
2	(Poland) K Jans-Ignacik (Czech Republic) R Voráčová	6	6

Quarterfinals
(France) V Muntean (Russia) N Vikhlyantseva	6	4	[4]
(Argentina) T Búa (Austria) S Klemenschits	4	6	[10]
3	(Switzerland) X Knoll (Serbia) A Krunić	6	6
(France) A Hesse (Luxembourg) M Minella	3	2
(Kazakhstan) Z Diyas (Ukraine) M Zanevska	6	4	[6]
4	(Romania) A Mitu (Netherlands) D Schuurs	4	6	[10]
(France) M Arcangioli (Brazil) B Haddad Maia	2	3
2	(Poland) K Jans-Ignacik (Czech Republic) R Voráčová	6	6

Semifinals
(Argentina) T Búa (Austria) S Klemenschits	1	0
3	(Switzerland) X Knoll (Serbia) A Krunić	6	6
4	(Romania) A Mitu (Netherlands) D Schuurs	6	6
2	(Poland) K Jans-Ignacik (Czech Republic) R Voráčová	0	1

Final
3	(Switzerland) X Knoll (Serbia) A Krunić	4	5
4	(Romania) A Mitu (Netherlands) D Schuurs	6	7
