= 2015 Open GDF Suez de Cagnes-sur-Mer Alpes-Maritimes – Doubles =

Doubles
- 2015 Open GDF Suez de Cagnes-sur-Mer Alpes-Maritimes

Final
- Champions: (United Kingdom) Johanna Konta (France) Laura Thorpe
- Runners-up: (United Kingdom) Jocelyn Rae (United Kingdom) Anna Smith
- Score: 1–6, 6–4, [10–5]

Events
Singles	Doubles
← 2014 ·	Open GDF Suez de Cagnes-sur-Mer Alpes-Maritimes	· 2016 →

Kiki Bertens and Johanna Larsson were the defending champions, but Larsson chose not to participate. Bertens partnered Eva Hrdinová, but lost in the first round to Johanna Konta and Laura Thorpe.

Konta and Thorpe then won the title, defeating Jocelyn Rae and Anna Smith in the final, 1–6, 6–4, [10–5].

== Seeds ==
1. (Chinese Taipei) Chan Chin-wei / (Chinese Taipei) Chuang Chia-jung (quarterfinals)
2. (United Kingdom) Jocelyn Rae / (United Kingdom) Anna Smith (final)
3. (Netherlands) Kiki Bertens / (Czech Republic) Eva Hrdinová (first round)
4. (Ukraine) Nadiia Kichenok / (Poland) Magda Linette (quarterfinals)

== Draw ==
=== Key ===
- Q = Qualifier
- WC = Wild card
- LL = Lucky loser
- Alt = Alternate
- SE = Special exempt
- PR = Protected ranking
- ITF = ITF entry
- JE = Junior exempt
- w/o = Walkover
- r = Retired
- d = Defaulted
- SR = Special ranking

First round
1	(Chinese Taipei) C-w Chan (Chinese Taipei) C-j Chuang	6	6
(Argentina) T Búa (Chile) D Seguel	4	4
(Ukraine) M Zanevska (Mexico) R Zarazúa	2	3
(Russia) D Gavrilova (Belgium) A Van Uytvanck	6	6
3	(Netherlands) K Bertens (Czech Republic) E Hrdinová	5	6^{3}
(United Kingdom) J Konta (France) L Thorpe	7	7^{7}
(Austria) S Klemenschits (Belarus) A Sasnovich	6	6
WC	(France) V Rémy (France) M Témin	1	0
(Israel) J Glushko (Brazil) T Pereira	5	4
(United States) N Melichar (United States) A Muhammad	7	6
(Russia) O Doroshina (Belarus) L Marozava	5	1
4	(Ukraine) N Kichenok (Poland) M Linette	7	6
(Spain) B García Vidagany (France) A Hesse	6	6
WC	(Uzbekistan) N Abduraimova (Ukraine) A Fomina	2	4
WC	(France) I Ramialison (France) C Sibille	3	6	[8]
2	(United Kingdom) J Rae (United Kingdom) A Smith	6	4	[10]

Quarterfinals
1	(Chinese Taipei) C-w Chan (Chinese Taipei) C-j Chuang	6	2	[5]
(Russia) D Gavrilova (Belgium) A Van Uytvanck	4	6	[10]
(United Kingdom) J Konta (France) L Thorpe	6	7
(Austria) S Klemenschits (Belarus) A Sasnovich	4	5
(United States) N Melichar (United States) A Muhammad	7	6
4	(Ukraine) N Kichenok (Poland) M Linette	5	2
(Spain) B García Vidagany (France) A Hesse	5	5
2	(United Kingdom) J Rae (United Kingdom) A Smith	7	7

Semifinals
(Russia) D Gavrilova (Belgium) A Van Uytvanck
(United Kingdom) J Konta (France) L Thorpe	w/o
(United States) N Melichar (United States) A Muhammad	2	1
2	(United Kingdom) J Rae (United Kingdom) A Smith	6	6

Final
(United Kingdom) J Konta (France) L Thorpe	1	6	[10]
2	(United Kingdom) J Rae (United Kingdom) A Smith	6	4	[5]
