= 2014 Lorraine Open 88 – Doubles =

Doubles
- 2014 Lorraine Open 88

Final
- Champions: (Russia) Alexandra Panova (France) Laura Thorpe
- Runners-up: (Romania) Irina-Camelia Begu (Argentina) María Irigoyen
- Score: 6–3, 4–0, ret.

Events
Singles	Doubles
← 2013 ·	Lorraine Open 88	· 2015 →

Vanesa Furlanetto and Amandine Hesse were the defending champions, but both players chose not to come back this year. Furlanetto competed in Denain and Hesse at the Reinert Open.

Alexandra Panova and Laura Thorpe won the tournament after Irina-Camelia Begu and María Irigoyen were forced to retire in the second set, with the final score of 6–3, 4–0, ret.

== Seeds ==
1. (Romania) Irina-Camelia Begu / (Argentina) María Irigoyen (final; retired)
2. (Russia) Alexandra Panova / (France) Laura Thorpe (champions)
3. (United States) Irina Falconi / (United States) Anna Tatishvili (semifinals)
4. (Spain) Lara Arruabarrena / (Romania) Alexandra Dulgheru (quarterfinals)

== Draw ==
=== Key ===
- Q = Qualifier
- WC = Wild card
- LL = Lucky loser
- Alt = Alternate
- SE = Special exempt
- PR = Protected ranking
- ITF = ITF entry
- JE = Junior exempt
- w/o = Walkover
- r = Retired
- d = Defaulted
- SR = Special ranking

First round
(Luxembourg) M Minella (Argentina) P Ormaechea	6	6
(Turkey) H Esen (Turkey) L Esen	4	2
4	(Spain) L Arruabarrena (Romania) A Dulgheru	6	3	[10]
(Spain) L Domínguez Lino (Brazil) T Pereira	3	6	[3]
(Italy) C Coppola (Australia) C Rigozzi	1	1
(Russia) M Gasparyan (Montenegro) D Kovinić	6	6
(Ukraine) A Fomina (Germany) C Shakovets	6	5	[10]
(Spain) A Fernández Rabener (Spain) L Pous Tió	1	7	[7]
(Austria) S Klemenschits (Germany) T Maria	6	6
(France) A Collombon (France) C Sibille	4	1

Quarterfinals
1	(Romania) I-C Begu (Argentina) M Irigoyen	6	6
(Luxembourg) M Minella (Argentina) P Ormaechea	0	3
4	(Spain) L Arruabarrena (Romania) A Dulgheru	1	6^{4}
(Russia) M Gasparyan (Montenegro) D Kovinić	6	7^{7}
(Ukraine) A Fomina (Germany) C Shakovets	4	0
3	(United States) I Falconi (United States) A Tatishvili	6	6
(Austria) S Klemenschits (Germany) T Maria	4	6	[5]
2	(Russia) A Panova (France) L Thorpe	6	2	[10]

Semifinals
1	(Romania) I-C Begu (Argentina) M Irigoyen	6	3	[18]
(Russia) M Gasparyan (Montenegro) D Kovinić	4	6	[16]
3	(United States) I Falconi (United States) A Tatishvili	7^{7}	3	[3]
2	(Russia) A Panova (France) L Thorpe	6^{3}	6	[10]

Final
1	(Romania) I-C Begu (Argentina) M Irigoyen	3	0^{r}
2	(Russia) A Panova (France) L Thorpe	6	4
