= 2015 Lorraine Open 88 – Doubles =

Doubles
- 2015 Lorraine Open 88

Final
- Champions: (Georgia (country)) Oksana Kalashnikova (Montenegro) Danka Kovinić
- Runners-up: (France) Irina Ramialison (France) Constance Sibille
- Score: 2–6, 6–3, [10–6]

Events
Singles	Doubles
← 2014 ·	Lorraine Open 88	· 2016 →

Alexandra Panova and Laura Thorpe were the defending champions, but both players chose not to participate.

Oksana Kalashnikova and Danka Kovinić won the title, defeating Irina Ramialison and Constance Sibille in the final, 2–6, 6–3, [10–6].

== Seeds ==
1. (Georgia (country)) Oksana Kalashnikova / (Montenegro) Danka Kovinić (champions)
2. (Spain) Beatriz García Vidagany / (Luxembourg) Mandy Minella (quarterfinals)
3. (Argentina) Tatiana Búa / (United States) Nicole Melichar (first round)
4. (Slovakia) Jana Čepelová / (Slovakia) Chantal Škamlová (semifinals)

== Draw ==
=== Key ===
- Q = Qualifier
- WC = Wild card
- LL = Lucky loser
- Alt = Alternate
- SE = Special exempt
- PR = Protected ranking
- ITF = ITF entry
- JE = Junior exempt
- w/o = Walkover
- r = Retired
- d = Defaulted
- SR = Special ranking

First round
(France) É Leune (Russia) N Vikhlyantseva	2	0
(Belgium) M Boev (South Africa) M Sammons	6	6
3	(Argentina) T Búa (United States) N Melichar	4	2
(Slovakia) J Husárová (Czech Republic) T Smitková	6	6
(Argentina) G Pérez Rojas (Italy) G Sanesi	1	1
(Romania) A Mitu (Latvia) J Ostapenko	6	6
(Poland) A Barańska (France) V Muntean	5	4
(Spain) G García Pérez (Spain) C Sánchez Quintanar	7	6
(Spain) A Fernández Rabener (France) S Reix	7^{7}	5	[11]
4	(Slovakia) J Čepelová (Slovakia) C Škamlová	6^{4}	7	[13]
(France) I Ramialison (France) C Sibille	7	6
(France) M Partaud (France) C Touly	5	1

Quarterfinals
1	(Georgia (country)) O Kalashnikova (Montenegro) D Kovinić	6	6
(Belgium) M Boev (South Africa) M Sammons	4	3
(Slovakia) J Husárová (Czech Republic) T Smitková	2	6	[10]
(Romania) A Mitu (Latvia) J Ostapenko	6	2	[7]
(Spain) G García Pérez (Spain) C Sánchez Quintanar	3	4
4	(Slovakia) J Čepelová (Slovakia) C Škamlová	6	6
(France) I Ramialison (France) C Sibille	4	6	[10]
2	(Spain) B García Vidagany (Luxembourg) M Minella	6	3	[1]

Semifinals
1	(Georgia (country)) O Kalashnikova (Montenegro) D Kovinić	6	6
(Slovakia) J Husárová (Czech Republic) T Smitková	3	2
4	(Slovakia) J Čepelová (Slovakia) C Škamlová	4	2
(France) I Ramialison (France) C Sibille	6	6

Final
1	(Georgia (country)) O Kalashnikova (Montenegro) D Kovinić	2	6	[10]
(France) I Ramialison (France) C Sibille	6	3	[6]
