= 2016 Engie Open de Cagnes-sur-Mer Alpes-Maritimes – Singles =

Singles
- 2016 Engie Open de Cagnes-sur-Mer Alpes-Maritimes

Final
- Champion: (Poland) Magda Linette
- Runner-up: (Germany) Carina Witthöft
- Score: 6–3, 7–5

Events
Singles	Doubles
← 2015 ·	Engie Open de Cagnes-sur-Mer Alpes-Maritimes	· 2017 →

Carina Witthöft was the defending champion, but lost in the final to Magda Linette, 3–6, 5–7.

== Seeds ==
1. (Germany) Carina Witthöft (final)
2. (Kazakhstan) Zarina Diyas (quarterfinals)
3. (France) Pauline Parmentier (quarterfinals)
4. (Poland) Magda Linette (champion)
5. (Switzerland) Stefanie Vögele (quarterfinals)
6. (Germany) Tatjana Maria (semifinals)
7. (Romania) Andreea Mitu (second round)
8. (Russia) Elizaveta Kulichkova (first round, retired)

== Main draw ==
=== Key ===
- Q = Qualifier
- WC = Wild card
- LL = Lucky loser
- Alt = Alternate
- SE = Special exempt
- PR = Protected ranking
- ITF = ITF entry
- JE = Junior exempt
- w/o = Walkover
- r = Retired
- d = Defaulted
- SR = Special ranking

=== Finals ===
Semifinals
1	(Germany) Carina Witthöft	1	6	6
6	(Germany) Tatjana Maria	6	3	3
4	(Poland) Magda Linette	4	6	6
(Ukraine) Maryna Zanevska	6	3	1

Final
1	(Germany) Carina Witthöft	3	5
4	(Poland) Magda Linette	6	7

=== Top half ===
First round
1	(Germany) C Witthöft	6	7^{8}
Q	(Czech Republic) K Muchová	0	6^{6}
(Slovakia) J Čepelová	6	6
(France) M Johansson	4	3
LL	(Brazil) B Haddad Maia	6^{6}	2
(Ukraine) K Kozlova	7^{8}	6
WC	(France) M Arcangioli	2	5
7	(Romania) A Mitu	6	7
3	(France) P Parmentier	6	6
(Serbia) I Jorović	1	2
(Germany) A Schäfer	6	6
(China) Y Zhang	3	1
WC	(France) I Ramialison	6^{5}	6^{4}
Q	(Denmark) K Barritza	7^{7}	7^{7}
(Russia) A Pivovarova	2	1
6	(Germany) T Maria	6	6

Second round
1	(Germany) C Witthöft	3	6	7
(Slovakia) J Čepelová	6	3	5
(Ukraine) K Kozlova	6	6
7	(Romania) A Mitu	2	2
3	(France) P Parmentier	6	4	6
(Germany) A Schäfer	3	6	1
Q	(Denmark) K Barritza	6	4	2
6	(Germany) T Maria	4	6	6

Quarterfinals
1	(Germany) C Witthöft	4	7^{7}	6
(Ukraine) K Kozlova	6	6^{4}	0
3	(France) P Parmentier	5	6	5
6	(Germany) T Maria	7	3	7

Semifinals
1	(Germany) C Witthöft	1	6	6
6	(Germany) T Maria	6	3	3

=== Bottom half ===
First round
5	(Switzerland) S Vögele	6	6
(Russia) N Vikhlyantseva	4	0
(France) A Hesse	6	6
(France) F Ferro	4	3
(Serbia) A Krunić	3	6	6
Q	(Spain) O Sáez Larra	6	2	2
LL	(France) A van Cauter	4	0
4	(Poland) M Linette	6	6
8	(Russia) E Kulichkova	6^{4}	1^{r}
Q	(Georgia (country)) E Gorgodze	7^{7}	3
(Luxembourg) M Minella	3	4
(Ukraine) M Zanevska	6	6
(France) V Razzano	6	6
LL	(Germany) T Korpatsch	0	2
(Netherlands) R Hogenkamp	1	4
2	(Kazakhstan) Z Diyas	6	6

Second round
5	(Switzerland) S Vögele	6	7^{7}
(France) A Hesse	3	6^{5}
(Serbia) A Krunić	3	4
4	(Poland) M Linette	6	6
Q	(Georgia (country)) E Gorgodze	2	6	2
(Ukraine) M Zanevska	6	4	6
(France) V Razzano	4	3
2	(Kazakhstan) Z Diyas	6	6

Quarterfinals
5	(Switzerland) S Vögele	2	6^{3}
4	(Poland) M Linette	6	7^{7}
(Ukraine) M Zanevska	6	6
2	(Kazakhstan) Z Diyas	2	2

Semifinals
4	(Poland) M Linette	4	6	6
(Ukraine) M Zanevska	6	3	1
