= 2015 Lorraine Open 88 – Singles =

Singles
- 2015 Lorraine Open 88

Final
- Champion: (Romania) Alexandra Dulgheru
- Runner-up: (Kazakhstan) Yulia Putintseva
- Score: 6–3, 1–6, 7–5

Events
Singles	Doubles
← 2014 ·	Lorraine Open 88	· 2016 →

Irina-Camelia Begu is the defending champion.

Alexandra Dulgheru won the title, defeating Yulia Putintseva in the final, 6–3, 1–6, 7–5.

== Seeds ==
1. (Romania) Alexandra Dulgheru (champion)
2. (Czech Republic) Tereza Smitková (quarterfinals)
3. (Germany) Annika Beck (first round)
4. (Romania) Andreea Mitu (first round)
5. (Brazil) Teliana Pereira (semifinals)
6. (Spain) Lourdes Domínguez Lino (quarterfinals)
7. (Montenegro) Danka Kovinić (semifinals)
8. (Kazakhstan) Yulia Putintseva (final)

== Main draw ==
=== Key ===
- Q = Qualifier
- WC = Wild card
- LL = Lucky loser
- Alt = Alternate
- SE = Special exempt
- PR = Protected ranking
- ITF = ITF entry
- JE = Junior exempt
- w/o = Walkover
- r = Retired
- d = Defaulted
- SR = Special ranking

=== Finals ===
Semifinals
1	(Romania) Alexandra Dulgheru	6	6
5	(Brazil) Teliana Pereira	0	3
8	(Kazakhstan) Yulia Putintseva	6	6
7	(Montenegro) Danka Kovinić	1	3

Final
1	(Romania) Alexandra Dulgheru	6	1	7
8	(Kazakhstan) Yulia Putintseva	3	6	5

=== Top half ===
First round
1	(Romania) A Dulgheru	6	6
WC	(France) C Sibille	4	2
(Netherlands) K Bertens	7^{8}	6
(Slovakia) J Čepelová	6^{6}	2
(Czech Republic) K Koukalová	1	3
(Slovakia) K Kučová	6	6
WC	(France) F Ferro	3	2
6	(Spain) L Domínguez Lino	6	6
3	(Germany) A Beck	6	4	5
WC	(Latvia) J Ostapenko	4	6	7
Q	(Switzerland) L Michel	5	3
(Switzerland) S Vögele	7	6
Q	(Spain) G García Pérez	6	5	7
(Spain) S Soler Espinosa	3	7	5
WC	(France) C Paquet	6	4	3
5	(Brazil) T Pereira	4	6	6

Second round
1	(Romania) A Dulgheru	6	6
(Netherlands) K Bertens	3	0
(Slovakia) K Kučová	4	3
6	(Spain) L Domínguez Lino	6	6
WC	(Latvia) J Ostapenko	3	6	6^{3}
(Switzerland) S Vögele	6	1	7^{7}
Q	(Spain) G García Pérez	6	2	5
5	(Brazil) T Pereira	3	6	7

Quarterfinals
1	(Romania) A Dulgheru	5	6	6
6	(Spain) L Domínguez Lino	7	3	1
(Switzerland) S Vogele	6^{4}	4
5	(Brazil) T Pereira	7^{7}	6

Semifinals
1	(Romania) A Dulgheru	6	6
5	(Brazil) T Pereira	0	3

=== Bottom half ===
First round
8	(Kazakhstan) Y Putintseva	6	6
Q	(Germany) N Zander	3	3
(Luxembourg) M Minella	6	6
LL	(Italy) G Sanesi	3	1
(Croatia) D Vekić	2	7^{7}	7^{7}
(United States) A Tatishvili	6	6^{5}	6^{2}
(Romania) S Cîrstea	6	7^{7}
4	(Romania) A Mitu	3	6^{3}
7	(Montenegro) D Kovinić	6	6
(United States) G Min	2	4
(France) O Dodin	6	6^{6}	6
(France) I Ramialison	4	7^{8}	1
LL	(Slovakia) R Šramková	6	3	7^{7}
LL	(France) C Touly	4	6	6^{5}
Q	(Russia) N Vikhlyantseva	5	3
2	(Czech Republic) T Smitková	7	6

Second round
(Kazakhstan) Y Putintseva	6	7^{7}
(Luxembourg) M Minella	2	6^{4}
(Croatia) D Vekić	7^{7}	5	4
(Romania) S Cîrstea	6^{4}	7	6
7	(Montenegro) D Kovinić	6	6
(France) O Dodin	4	1
LL	(Slovakia) R Šramková	4	2
2	(Czech Republic) T Smitková	6	6

Quarterfinals
8	(Kazakhstan) Y Putintseva	7	6
(Romania) S Cîrstea	5	2
7	(Montenegro) D Kovinić	6	7
2	(Czech Republic) T Smitková	1	5

Semifinals
8	(Kazakhstan) Y Putintseva	6	6
7	(Montenegro) D Kovinić	1	3
