= 2013 Open 88 Contrexéville =

- Date: 15–21 July
- Edition: 7th
- Draw: 32S / 16D
- Prize money: $50,000
- Surface: Clay
- Location: Contrexéville, France

Champions

Singles
- (Switzerland) Timea Bacsinszky

Doubles
- (Argentina) Vanesa Furlanetto / (France) Amandine Hesse
← 2012 ·	Open 88 Contrexéville	· 2014 →

The 2013 Open 88 Contrexéville was a professional tennis tournament played on outdoor clay courts. It was the seventh edition of the tournament which was part of the 2013 ITF Women's Circuit, offering a total of $50,000 in prize money. It took place in Contrexéville, France, on 15–21 July 2013.

== Singles main draw entrants ==
=== Seeds ===
Country	Player	Rank^{1}	Seed
FRA	Claire Feuerstein	154	1
GER	Anna-Lena Friedsam	179	2
GER	Anne Schäfer	201	3
SUI	Timea Bacsinszky	204	4
TUN	Ons Jabeur	206	5
GEO	Sofia Shapatava	216	6
SUI	Amra Sadiković	241	7
NED	Angelique van der Meet	271	8

- ^{1} Rankings as of 8 July 2013

=== Other entrants ===
The following players received wildcards into the singles main draw:

- (France) Océane Adam
- (France) Fiona Ferro
- (France) Victoria Muntean
- (France) Anaève Pain

The following players received entry from the qualifying draw:

- (France) Alix Collombon
- (Croatia) Silvia Njirić
- (Netherlands) Lisanne van Riet
- (Germany) Nina Zander

The following player received entry through a Junior Exempt:

- (Croatia) Ana Konjuh

== Champions ==
=== Women's singles ===
- (Switzerland) Timea Bacsinszky def. (Spain) Beatriz García Vidagany 6–1, 6–1

=== Women's doubles ===
- (Argentina) Vanesa Furlanetto / (France) Amandine Hesse def. (Croatia) Ana Konjuh / (Croatia) Silvia Njirić 7–6^{(7–3)}, 6–4
