= 2015 Lorraine Open 88 =

- Date: 6–12 July
- Edition: 9th
- Category: ITF Women's Circuit
- Prize money: $100,000
- Surface: Clay
- Location: Contrexéville, France

Champions

Singles
- (Romania) Alexandra Dulgheru

Doubles
- (Georgia (country)) Oksana Kalashnikova / (Montenegro) Danka Kovinić
| ← 2014 · | Lorraine Open 88 | · 2016 → |

The 2015 Lorraine Open 88 was a professional tennis tournament played on outdoor clay courts. It was the ninth edition of the tournament and part of the 2015 ITF Women's Circuit, offering a total of $100,000 in prize money. It took place in Contrexéville, France, on 6–12 June 2015.

== Singles main draw entrants ==
=== Seeds ===
| Country | Player | Rank^{1} | Seed |
|---|---|---|---|
| ROU | Alexandra Dulgheru | 60 | 1 |
| CZE | Tereza Smitková | 62 | 2 |
| GER | Annika Beck | 70 | 3 |
| ROU | Andreea Mitu | 71 | 4 |
| BRA | Teliana Pereira | 77 | 5 |
| ESP | Lourdes Domínguez Lino | 90 | 6 |
| MNE | Danka Kovinić | 92 | 7 |
| KAZ | Yulia Putintseva | 95 | 8 |

- ^{1} Rankings as of 29 June 2015

=== Other entrants ===
The following players received wildcards into the singles main draw:

- (France) Fiona Ferro
- (Latvia) Jeļena Ostapenko
- (France) Chloé Paquet
- (France) Constance Sibille

The following players received entry from the qualifying draw:

- (Spain) Georgina García Pérez
- (Switzerland) Lara Michel
- (Russia) Natalia Vikhlyantseva
- (Germany) Nina Zander

The following player received entry by lucky loser spots:

- (Italy) Gaia Sanesi
- (Slovakia) Rebecca Šramková
- (France) Carla Touly

== Champions ==
=== Singles ===
- (Romania) Alexandra Dulgheru def. (Kazakhstan) Yulia Putintseva, 6–3, 1–6, 7–5

=== Doubles ===
- (Georgia (country)) Oksana Kalashnikova / (Montenegro) Danka Kovinić def. (France) Irina Ramialison / (France) Constance Sibille, 2–6, 6–3, [10–6]
