= 2014 Lorraine Open 88 =

- Date: 30 June–6 July
- Edition: 8th
- Category: ITF Women's Circuit
- Prize money: $100,000
- Surface: Clay
- Location: Contrexéville, France

Champions

Singles
- (Romania) Irina-Camelia Begu

Doubles
- (Russia) Alexandra Panova / (France) Laura Thorpe
← 2013 ·	Lorraine Open 88	· 2015 →

The 2014 Lorraine Open 88 was a professional tennis tournament played on outdoor clay courts. It marked the eighth edition of the tournament and was part of the 2014 ITF Women's Circuit, offering a total of $100,000 in prize money. The event took place in Contrexéville, France, on 30 June–6 July 2014.

== Singles main draw entrants ==
=== Seeds ===
Country	Player	Rank^{1}	Seed
EST	Kaia Kanepi	42	1
GER	Annika Beck	54	2
AUT	Patricia Mayr-Achleitner	74	3
SWE	Johanna Larsson	80	4
ROU	Irina-Camelia Begu	81	5
ROU	Alexandra Cadanțu	83	6
BRA	Teliana Pereira	88	7
ARG	Paula Ormaechea	90	8

- ^{1} Rankings as of 23 June 2014

=== Other entrants ===
The following players received wildcards into the singles main draw:

- (France) Alix Collombon
- (France) Mathilde Johansson
- (France) Constance Sibille
- (France) Laura Thorpe

The following players received entry from the qualifying draw:

- (Switzerland) Lara Michel
- (Luxembourg) Mandy Minella
- (Italy) Gaia Sanesi
- (Lithuania) Lina Stančiūtė

The following player received entry by a protected ranking:

- (Uzbekistan) Akgul Amanmuradova

== Champions ==
=== Singles ===
- (Romania) Irina-Camelia Begu def. (Estonia) Kaia Kanepi 6–3, 6–4

=== Doubles ===
- (Russia) Alexandra Panova / (France) Laura Thorpe def. (Romania) Irina-Camelia Begu / (Argentina) María Irigoyen 6–3, 4–0, ret.
