= 2010 Fed Cup Europe/Africa Zone Group I – play-offs =

The play-offs of the 2010 Fed Cup Europe/Africa Zone Group I were the final stages of the Group I Zonal Competition involving teams from Europe and Africa. Using the positions determined in their pools, the sixteen teams faced off to determine their placing in the 2010 Fed Cup Europe/Africa Zone Group I. The top two teams advanced to World Group II play-offs, and the bottom two teams were relegated down to the Europe/Africa Zone Group II for the next year.

Placing	Pool A	Pool B	Pool C	Pool D
1	Slovenia	Switzerland	Sweden	Austria
2	Netherlands	Romania	Hungary	Great Britain
3	Israel	Croatia	Denmark	Belarus
4	Bulgaria	Portugal	Latvia	Bosnia and Herzegovina

== Promotion play-offs ==
The first placed teams of each pool were placed against each other in two head-to-head rounds. The winner of the rounds advanced to the World Group II play-offs, where they would get a chance to advance to the World Group II for next year.

=== Slovenia vs. Switzerland ===
Slovenia
3
Complexo de Tenis do Jamor, Estádio Nacional, Lisbon, Portugal
6 February 2010
Greenset Grand Prix hard (indoors)

Switzerland
0

			1	2	3
1	(Slovenia) (Switzerland)	Katarina Srebotnik; Amra Sadiković	6; 2	6^{4} 7^{7}	6; 1
2	(Slovenia) (Switzerland)	Polona Hercog; Sarah Moundir	6; 4	6; 1
3	(Slovenia) (Switzerland)	Polona Hercog / Katarina Srebotnik; Sarah Moundir / Amra Sadiković				w/o

=== Sweden vs. Austria ===
Sweden
3
Complexo de Tenis do Jamor, Estádio Nacional, Lisbon, Portugal
6 February 2010
Greenset Grand Prix hard (indoors)

Austria
0

			1	2	3
1	(Sweden) (Austria)	Johanna Larsson; Patricia Mayr	6; 3	6; 3
2	(Sweden) (Austria)	Sofia Arvidsson; Sybille Bammer	6; 1	6; 1
3	(Sweden) (Austria)	Sofia Arvidsson / Johanna Larsson; Sandra Klemenschits / Yvonne Meusburger				w/o

== Fifth to seventh play-off ==
The second placed teams of each pool were placed against each other in two ties. The winner of each tie was allocated fifth place in the Group while the losers were allocated seventh.

=== Netherlands vs. Great Britain ===
Netherlands
2
Complexo de Tenis do Jamor, Estádio Nacional, Lisbon, Portugal
6 February 2010
Greenset Grand Prix hard (indoors)

Great Britain
1

			1	2	3
1	(Netherlands) (United Kingdom)	Chayenne Ewijk; Anne Keothavong	6^{5} 7^{7}	3; 6
2	(Netherlands) (United Kingdom)	Arantxa Rus; Katie O'Brien	7; 5	3; 6	6; 4
3	(Netherlands) (United Kingdom)	Richèl Hogenkamp / Nicole Thijssen; Sarah Borwell / Katie O'Brien	6; 2	6; 4

=== Romania vs. Hungary ===
Romania
2
Complexo de Tenis do Jamor, Estádio Nacional, Lisbon, Portugal
6 February 2010
Greenset Grand Prix hard (indoors)

Hungary
1

			1	2	3
1	(Romania) (Hungary)	Irina-Camelia Begu; Zsófia Susányi	7^{7} 6^{3}	6; 1
2	(Romania) (Hungary)	Simona Halep; Réka-Luca Jani	6; 4	6; 2
3	(Romania) (Hungary)	Irina-Camelia Begu / Alexandra Dulgheru; Réka-Luca Jani / Anikó Kapros				w/o

== Ninth to eleventh play-off ==
The third placed teams of each pool were placed against each other in two ties. The winner of each tie was allocated ninth place in the Group while the losers were allocated eleventh.

=== Israel vs. Denmark ===
Israel
2
Complexo de Tenis do Jamor, Estádio Nacional, Lisbon, Portugal
6 February 2010
Greenset Grand Prix hard (indoors)

Denmark
1

			1	2	3
1	(Israel) (Denmark)	Keren Shlomo; Mai Grage	4; 6	4; 6
2	(Israel) (Denmark)	Julia Glushko; Malou Ejdesgaard	4; 6	1; 0		retired
3	(Israel) (Denmark)	Julia Glushko / Shahar Pe'er; Mai Grage / Karina Jacobsgaard	6; 0	6; 1

=== Croatia vs. Belarus ===
Croatia
1
Complexo de Tenis do Jamor, Estádio Nacional, Lisbon, Portugal
6 February 2010
Greenset Grand Prix hard (indoors)

Belarus
2

			1	2	3
1	(Croatia) (Belarus)	Silvia Njirić; Tatiana Poutchek	2; 6	0; 6
2	(Croatia) (Belarus)	Ajla Tomljanović; Ekaterina Dzehalevich	7^{7} 6^{2}	6; 4
3	(Croatia) (Belarus)	Silvia Njirić / Ajla Tomljanović; Ekaterina Dzehalevich / Tatiana Poutchek	1; 6	1; 6

== Relegation play-offs ==
The last placed teams of each pool were placed against each other in two ties. The losing team of the rounds were relegated to Group II for next year.

=== Bulgaria vs. Portugal ===
Bulgaria
2
Complexo de Tenis do Jamor, Estádio Nacional, Lisbon, Portugal
6 February 2010
Greenset Grand Prix hard (indoors)

Portugal
1

			1	2	3
1	(Bulgaria) (Portugal)	Dia Evtimova; Neuza Silva	6; 1	6; 1
2	(Bulgaria) (Portugal)	Tsvetana Pironkova; Michelle Larcher de Brito	6; 3	6; 3
3	(Bulgaria) (Portugal)	Dia Evtimova / Tsvetana Pironkova; Maria João Koehler / Neuza Silva				w/o

=== Latvia vs. Bosnia and Herzegovina ===
Latvia
3
Complexo de Tenis do Jamor, Estádio Nacional, Lisbon, Portugal
3 February 2010
Greenset Grand Prix hard (indoors)

Bosnia and Herzegovina
0

			1	2	3
1	(Latvia) (Bosnia and Herzegovina)	Irina Kuzmina; Ema Burgić	5; 7	6; 3	7^{7} 6^{5}
2	(Latvia) (Bosnia and Herzegovina)	Diāna Marcinkēviča; Sandra Martinović	7; 5	6; 1
3	(Latvia) (Bosnia and Herzegovina)	Līga Dekmeijere / Diāna Marcinkēviča; Ema Burgić / Anita Husarić	4; 6	6; 2	6; 0

== Final placements ==
Placing	Teams	
Promoted	Slovenia	Sweden
Third	Switzerland	Austria
Fifth	Netherlands	Romania
Seventh	Great Britain	Hungary
Ninth	Israel	Belarus
Eleventh	Denmark	Croatia
Thirteenth	Bulgaria	Latvia
Relegated	Portugal	Bosnia and Herzegovina

- Slovenia and Sweden advanced to the World Group II play-offs. The Swedes were drawn against China, and they won 3–2, which allowed them to advance to World Group II, while the Slovenians were drawn against Japan and won 4–1. They also thus advanced to World Group II for 2011.
- Portugal and Bosnia and Herzegovina were relegated down to Europe/Africa Zone Group II for the next year. They both placed first respectively in Pool A and Pool B, and also both won their promotion play-off matches. The two teams thus advanced back to Group I for 2012.
