= 2010 Fed Cup Europe/Africa Zone Group I – Pool B =

Group B of the 2010 Fed Cup Europe/Africa Zone Group I was one of four pools in the Europe/Africa Zone Group I of the 2010 Fed Cup. Four teams competed in a round-robin competition, with the top team and the bottom team proceeding to their respective sections of the play-offs: the top team played for advancement to the World Group II Play-offs, while the bottom team faced potential relegation to Group II.

		(Switzerland) SUI	(Croatia) CRO	(Romania) ROU	(Portugal) POR	RR; W–L	Set; W–L	Game; W–L	Standings
20	Switzerland		3–0	2–1	3–0	3–0	15–5	117–67	1
27	Croatia	0–3		1–2	2–1	1–2	9–10	74–103	3
39	Romania	1–2	2–1		2–1	2–1	11–12	122–111	2
45	Portugal	0–3	1–2	1–2		0–3	6–14	83–115	4

== Switzerland vs. Romania ==
Switzerland
2
Complexo de Tenis do Jamor, Estádio Nacional, Lisbon, Portugal
3 February 2010
Greenset Grand Prix hard (indoors)

Romania
1

			1	2	3
1	(Switzerland) (Romania)	Amra Sadiković; Ioana Raluca Olaru	7^{7} 6^{1}	5; 7	6; 4
2	(Switzerland) (Romania)	Patty Schnyder; Alexandra Dulgheru	6; 3	6^{6} 7^{8}	0; 6
3	(Switzerland) (Romania)	Amra Sadiković / Patty Schnyder; Simona Halep / Ioana Raluca Olaru	7^{7} 6^{5}	6; 1

== Croatia vs. Portugal ==
Croatia
2
Complexo de Tenis do Jamor, Estádio Nacional, Lisbon, Portugal
3 February 2010
Greenset Grand Prix hard (indoors)

Portugal
1

			1	2	3
1	(Croatia) (Portugal)	Ajla Tomljanović; Neuza Silva	7^{8} 6^{6}	6; 4
2	(Croatia) (Portugal)	Petra Martić; Michelle Larcher de Brito	6; 4	6; 1
3	(Croatia) (Portugal)	Jelena Kostanić Tošić / Silvia Njirić; Michelle Larcher de Brito / Neuza Silva	5; 7	4; 6

== Switzerland vs. Portugal ==
Switzerland
3
Complexo de Tenis do Jamor, Estádio Nacional, Lisbon, Portugal
4 February 2010
Greenset Grand Prix hard (indoors)

Portugal
0

			1	2	3
1	(Switzerland) (Portugal)	Amra Sadiković; Neuza Silva	6; 4	6; 1
2	(Switzerland) (Portugal)	Patty Schnyder; Michelle Larcher de Brito	6; 2	6; 4
3	(Switzerland) (Portugal)	Amra Sadiković / Sarah Moundir; Maria João Koehler / Frederica Piedade	7; 5	5; 7	6; 4

== Croatia vs. Romania ==
Croatia
1
Complexo de Tenis do Jamor, Estádio Nacional, Lisbon, Portugal
4 February 2010
Greenset Grand Prix hard (indoors)

Romania
2

			1	2	3
1	(Croatia) (Romania)	Ajla Tomljanović; Simona Halep	6^{5} 7^{7}	6; 1	6^{2} 7^{7}
2	(Croatia) (Romania)	Petra Martić; Alexandra Dulgheru	6; 3	6; 4
3	(Croatia) (Romania)	Petra Martić / Ajla Tomljanović; Alexandra Dulgheru / Simona Halep	7; 5	3; 6	4; 6

== Switzerland vs. Croatia ==
Switzerland
3
Complexo de Tenis do Jamor, Estádio Nacional, Lisbon, Portugal
5 February 2010
Greenset Grand Prix hard (indoors)

Croatia
0

			1	2	3
1	(Switzerland) (Croatia)	Amra Sadiković; Silvia Njirić	7^{7} 6^{3}	6; 1
2	(Switzerland) (Croatia)	Patty Schnyder; Petra Martić	6; 2	4; 6	7^{7} 6^{0}
3	(Switzerland) (Croatia)	Sarah Moundir / Patty Schnyder; Silvia Njirić / Ajla Tomljanović	2; 1			retired

== Romania vs. Portugal ==
Romania
2
Complexo de Tenis do Jamor, Estádio Nacional, Lisbon, Portugal
5 February 2010
Greenset Grand Prix hard (indoors)

Portugal
1

			1	2	3
1	(Romania) (Portugal)	Simona Halep; Maria João Koehler	6; 4	6; 1
2	(Romania) (Portugal)	Alexandra Dulgheru; Michelle Larcher de Brito	6; 0	5; 7	6; 2
3	(Romania) (Portugal)	Simona Halep / Irina-Camelia Begu; Maria João Koehler / Neuza Silva	5; 7	5; 7

== See also ==
- Fed Cup structure
