= 2014 Lorraine Open 88 – Singles =

Singles
- 2014 Lorraine Open 88

Final
- Champion: (Romania) Irina-Camelia Begu
- Runner-up: (Estonia) Kaia Kanepi
- Score: 6–3, 6–4

Events
Singles	Doubles
← 2013 ·	Lorraine Open 88	· 2015 →

Timea Bacsinszky was the defending champion, but chose not to participate.

Irina-Camelia Begu won the tournament, defeating Kaia Kanepi in the final, 6–3, 6–4.

== Seeds ==
1. (Estonia) Kaia Kanepi (final)
2. (Germany) Annika Beck (quarterfinals)
3. (Austria) Patricia Mayr-Achleitner (second round)
4. (Sweden) Johanna Larsson (semifinals)
5. (Romania) Irina-Camelia Begu (champion)
6. (Romania) Alexandra Cadanțu (second round)
7. (Brazil) Teliana Pereira (second round)
8. (Argentina) Paula Ormaechea (first round)

== Main draw ==
=== Key ===
- Q = Qualifier
- WC = Wild card
- LL = Lucky loser
- Alt = Alternate
- SE = Special exempt
- PR = Protected ranking
- ITF = ITF entry
- JE = Junior exempt
- w/o = Walkover
- r = Retired
- d = Defaulted
- SR = Special ranking

=== Finals ===
Semifinals
1	(Estonia) Kaia Kanepi	3	6	6
4	(Sweden) Johanna Larsson	6	3	2
5	(Romania) Irina-Camelia Begu	6	6
(United States) Melanie Oudin	2	2

Final
1	(Estonia) Kaia Kanepi	3	4
5	(Romania) Irina-Camelia Begu	6	6

=== Top half ===
First round
1	(Estonia) K Kanepi	4	6	6
Q	(Italy) G Sanesi	6	4	1
(Romania) A Dulgheru	6^{6}	6	6
(Montenegro) D Kovinić	7^{8}	1	1
Q	(Switzerland) L Michel	6	6^{5}	6
(Russia) A Panova	2	7^{7}	3
(United States) S Rogers	7^{10}	6
8	(Argentina) P Ormaechea	6^{8}	4
4	(Sweden) J Larsson	3	6	6
(Austria) T Paszek	6	1	2
(United States) I Falconi	7	5	6
WC	(France) C Sibille	5	7	3
Q	(Luxembourg) M Minella	6	7
(Spain) L Domínguez Lino	1	5
WC	(France) L Thorpe	4	1
6	(Romania) A Cadanțu	6	6

Second round
1	(Estonia) K Kanepi	6	6
(Romania) A Dulgheru	3	1
Q	(Switzerland) L Michel	2	3
(United States) S Rogers	6	6
4	(Sweden) J Larsson	4	7^{7}	6
(United States) I Falconi	6	6^{2}	2
Q	(Luxembourg) M Minella	7^{8}	5	6
6	(Romania) A Cadanțu	6^{6}	7	1

Quarterfinals
1	(Estonia) K Kanepi	6	6
(United States) S Rogers	1	2
4	(Sweden) J Larsson	4	7^{7}	6
Q	(Luxembourg) M Minella	6	6^{4}	1

Semifinals
1	(Estonia) K Kanepi	3	6	6
4	(Sweden) J Larsson	6	3	2

=== Bottom half ===
First round
5	(Romania) I-C Begu	3	6	6
(Sweden) S Arvidsson	6	0	0
Q	(Lithuania) L Stančiūtė	2	3
WC	(France) M Johansson	6	6
(United States) A Tatishvili	6	6
(Spain) L Arruabarrena	4	3
PR	(Uzbekistan) A Amanmuradova	1	5
3	(Austria) P Mayr-Achleitner	6	7
7	(Brazil) T Pereira	6	6
(Ukraine) M Zanevska	1	4
(Russia) M Gasparyan	5	3
(United States) M Oudin	7	6
(United States) G Min	6	7
WC	(France) A Collombon	1	5
(Argentina) M Irigoyen	2	2
2	(Germany) A Beck	6	6

Second round
5	(Romania) I-C Begu	4	7	6
WC	(France) M Johansson	6	5	4
(United States) A Tatishvili	6	6
3	(Austria) P Mayr-Achleitner	3	3
7	(Brazil) T Pereira	7	4	6^{2}
(United States) M Oudin	5	6	7^{7}
(United States) G Min	3	5
2	(Germany) A Beck	6	7

Quarterfinals
5	(Romania) I-C Begu	6	6
(United States) A Tatishvili	1	1
(United States) M Oudin	4	7^{7}	6
2	(Germany) A Beck	6	6^{3}	4

Semifinals
5	(Romania) I-C Begu	6	6
(United States) M Oudin	2	2
