= 2015 Open GDF Suez de Cagnes-sur-Mer Alpes-Maritimes – Singles =

Singles
- 2015 Open GDF Suez de Cagnes-sur-Mer Alpes-Maritimes

Final
- Champion: (Germany) Carina Witthöft
- Runner-up: (Germany) Tatjana Maria
- Score: 7–5, 6–1

Events
| Singles | Doubles |
| ← 2014 · | Open GDF Suez de Cagnes-sur-Mer Alpes-Maritimes | · 2016 → |

Sharon Fichman was the defending champion, but lost in the quarterfinals to top seed Carina Witthöft.

Witthöft then won the title, defeating Tatjana Maria in an all-German final, 7–5, 6–1.

== Seeds ==
1. (Germany) Carina Witthöft (champion)
2. (United States) Shelby Rogers (first round)
3. (Russia) Daria Gavrilova (quarterfinals)
4. (Brazil) Teliana Pereira (second round)
5. (United States) Irina Falconi (second round)
6. (Netherlands) Kiki Bertens (semifinals)
7. (Germany) Tatjana Maria (final)
8. (France) Pauline Parmentier (semifinals)

== Main draw ==
=== Key ===
- Q = Qualifier
- WC = Wild card
- LL = Lucky loser
- Alt = Alternate
- SE = Special exempt
- PR = Protected ranking
- ITF = ITF entry
- JE = Junior exempt
- w/o = Walkover
- r = Retired
- d = Defaulted
- SR = Special ranking

=== Finals ===
Semifinals
1 | (Germany) Carina Witthöft | 6 | 1 | 6
6 | (Netherlands) Kiki Bertens | 1 | 6 | 1
8 | (France) Pauline Parmentier | 6 | 4 | 4
7 | (Germany) Tatjana Maria | 2 | 6 | 6

Final
1 | (Germany) Carina Witthöft | 7 | 6
7 | (Germany) Tatjana Maria | 5 | 1

=== Top half ===
First round
1 | (Germany) C Witthöft | 2 | 6 | 6
(United States) N Gibbs | 6 | 4 | 2
(Turkey) Ç Büyükakçay | 6 | 6
Q | (Germany) T Korpatsch | 4 | 1
WC | (Canada) S Fichman | 6 | 6
(Uzbekistan) N Abduraimova | 3 | 4
Q | (Mexico) R Zarazúa | 1 | 0
5 | (United States) I Falconi | 6 | 6
4 | (Brazil) T Pereira | 6 | 6
PR | (Austria) T Paszek | 1 | 0
(Belarus) A Sasnovich | 7^{7} | 6
(Israel) J Glushko | 6^{3} | 2
Q | (Australia) O Rogowska | 1 | 4
Q | (Belgium) Y Bonaventure | 6 | 6
(Ukraine) M Zanevska | 5 | 2
6 | (Netherlands) K Bertens | 7 | 6

Second round
1 | (Germany) C Witthöft | 6 | 6
(Turkey) Ç Büyükakçay | 1 | 1
WC | (Canada) S Fichman | 2 | 6 | 6
5 | (United States) I Falconi | 6 | 2 | 3
4 | (Brazil) T Pereira | 6 | 4 | 4
(Belarus) A Sasnovich | 3 | 6 | 6
Q | (Belgium) Y Bonaventure | 2 | 1
6 | (Netherlands) K Bertens | 6 | 6

Quarterfinals
1 | (Germany) C Witthöft | 7^{7} | 6
WC | (Canada) S Fichman | 6^{3} | 2
(Belarus) A Sasnovich | 6^{5} | 4
6 | (Netherlands) K Bertens | 7^{7} | 6

Semifinals
1 | (Germany) C Witthöft | 6 | 1 | 6
6 | (Netherlands) K Bertens | 1 | 6 | 1

=== Bottom half ===
First round
8 | (France) P Parmentier | 6 | 7^{7}
(Russia) E Kulichkova | 1 | 6^{5}
(Croatia) T Mrdeža | 1 | 4
(Poland) M Linette | 6 | 6
(France) O Dodin | 1 | 4
(United Kingdom) J Konta | 6 | 6
WC | (France) F Ferro | 3 | 2
3 | (Russia) D Gavrilova | 6 | 6
7 | (Germany) T Maria | 6 | 7
(Switzerland) R Oprandi | 1 | 5
WC | (France) V Razzano | 6 | 1 | 4
WC | (France) M Johansson | 4 | 6 | 6
(Kazakhstan) Y Putintseva | 6 | 6
(Slovakia) K Kučová | 1 | 1
(Belgium) A Van Uytvanck | 6 | 6
2 | (United States) S Rogers | 2 | 1

Second round
8 | (France) P Parmentier | 3 | 6 | 6
(Poland) M Linette | 6 | 0 | 3
(United Kingdom) J Konta | 6 | 4 | 2
3 | (Russia) D Gavrilova | 2 | 6 | 6
7 | (Germany) T Maria | 6 | 6
WC | (France) M Johansson | 3 | 2
(Kazakhstan) Y Putintseva | 6 | 6
(Belgium) A Van Uytvanck | 2 | 1

Quarterfinals
8 | (France) P Parmentier | 7^{8} | 6
3 | (Russia) D Gavrilova | 6^{6} | 4
7 | (Germany) T Maria | 6 | 4 | 6
(Kazakhstan) Y Putintseva | 1 | 6 | 3

Semifinals
8 | (France) P Parmentier | 6 | 4 | 4
7 | (Germany) T Maria | 2 | 6 | 6
