= Sarah Moundir =

Swiss tennis player

- Full name: Sarah Moundir
- Country (sports): Switzerland
- Born: 29 May 1992 (age 32); Lucerne, Switzerland
- Prize money: $6,119

Singles
- Career record: 13–27
- Highest ranking: No. 889 (8 June 2009)

Doubles
- Career record: 7–6
- Career titles: 1 ITF

Team competitions
- Fed Cup: 2–1

Sarah Moundir (born 29 May 1992) is a Swiss tennis player.

Moundir won one doubles title on the ITF Women's Circuit in her career, and, in February 2010, made three appearances for the Switzerland Fed Cup team.

== ITF finals ==
=== Doubles (1–1) ===
Legend $100,000 tournaments $75,000 tournaments $50,000 tournaments $25,000 tournaments $10,000 tournaments	Finals by surface Hard (0–0) Clay (1–1) Grass (0–0) Carpet (0–0)

Result	Date	Tournament	Surface	Partner	Opponents	Score
Win	18 June 2007	Davos, Switzerland	Clay	(Switzerland) Nicole Riner	(Australia) Jessica Schaer (Spain) Sheila Solsona Carcasona	7–6^{(7–1)}, 6–3
Loss	21 June 2010	Davos, Switzerland	Clay	(Switzerland) Amra Sadiković	(United Kingdom) Amanda Elliott (Australia) Emelyn Starr	1–6, 2–6

== Fed Cup participation ==
=== Singles ===
Edition	Stage	Date	Location	Against	Surface	Opponent	W/L	Score
2010 Fed Cup; Europe/Africa Zone Group I	P/O	6 February 2010	Lisbon, Portugal	Slovenia	Hard (i)	(Slovenia) Polona Hercog	L	4–6, 1–6

=== Doubles ===
Edition	Stage	Date	Location	Against	Surface	Partner	Opponents	W/L	Score
2010 Fed Cup; Europe/Africa Zone Group I	R/R	4 February 2010	Lisbon, Portugal	Portugal	Hard (i)	(Switzerland) Amra Sadiković	(Portugal) Maria João Koehler (Portugal) Frederica Piedade	W	7–5, 5–7, 6–4
2010 Fed Cup; Europe/Africa Zone Group I	R/R	5 February 2010	Lisbon, Portugal	Croatia	Hard (i)	(Switzerland) Patty Schnyder	(Croatia) Silvia Njirić (Croatia) Ajla Tomljanović	W	2–1 ret.
