= 2015 Open GDF Suez de Cagnes-sur-Mer Alpes-Maritimes =

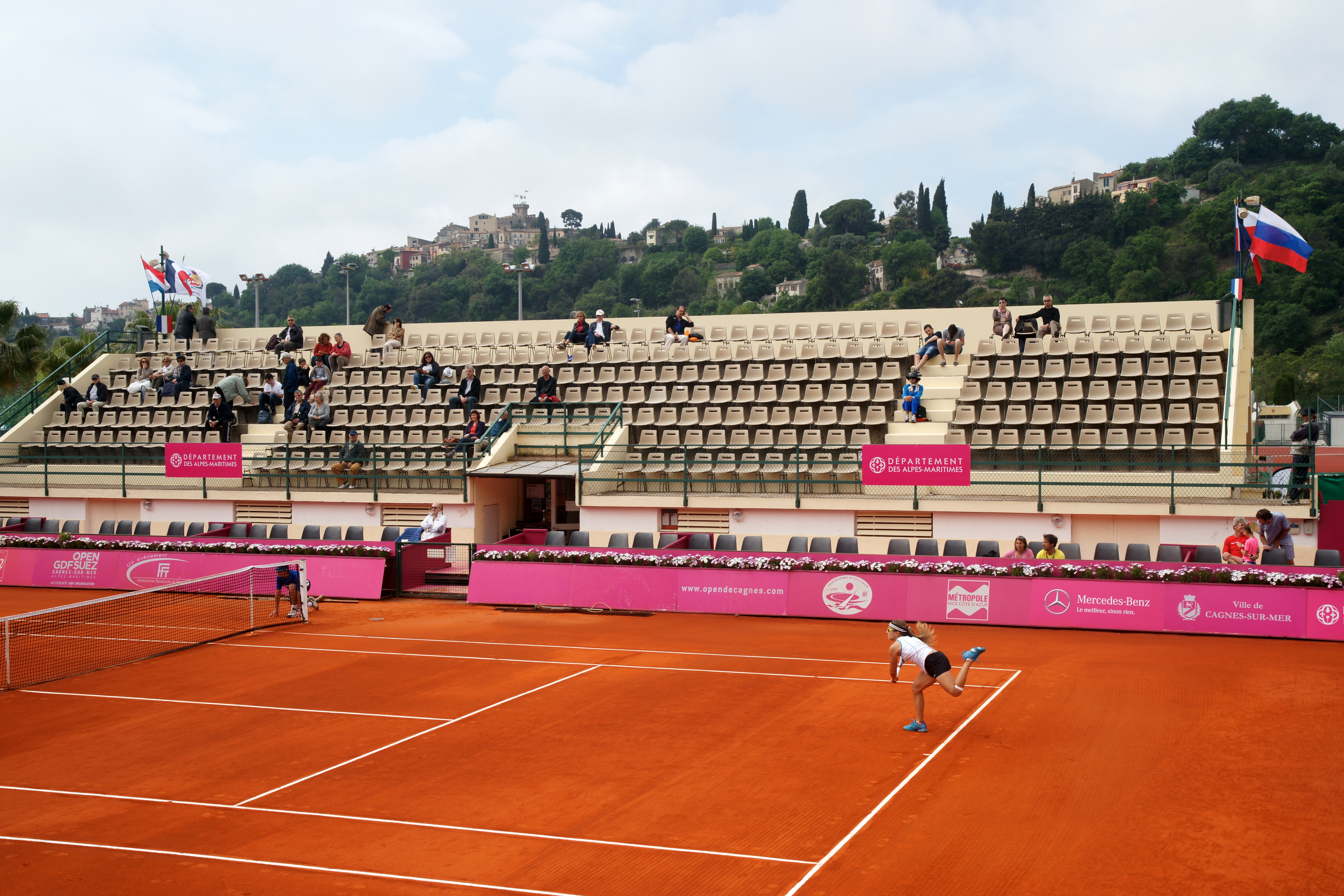
- Date: 4–10 May
- Edition: 18th
- Category: ITF Women's Circuit
- Prize money: $100,000
- Surface: Clay
- Location: Cagnes-sur-Mer, France

Champions

Singles
- (Germany) Carina Witthöft

Doubles
- (United Kingdom) Johanna Konta / (France) Laura Thorpe
← 2014 ·	Open GDF Suez de Cagnes-sur-Mer Alpes-Maritimes	· 2016 →

The 2015 Open GDF Suez de Cagnes-sur-Mer Alpes-Maritimes was a professional tennis tournament played on outdoor clay courts. It was the eighteenth edition of the tournament and part of the 2015 ITF Women's Circuit, offering a total of $100,000 in prize money. It took place in Cagnes-sur-Mer, France, on 4–10 May 2015.

== Singles main draw entrants ==
=== Seeds ===
Country	Player	Rank^{1}	Seed
GER	Carina Witthöft	70	1
USA	Shelby Rogers	78	2
RUS	Daria Gavrilova	79	3
BRA	Teliana Pereira	81	4
USA	Irina Falconi	83	5
NED	Kiki Bertens	85	6
GER	Tatjana Maria	87	7
FRA	Pauline Parmentier	89	8

- ^{1} Rankings as of 27 April 2015

=== Other entrants ===
The following players received wildcards into the singles main draw:

- (France) Fiona Ferro
- (Canada) Sharon Fichman
- (France) Mathilde Johansson
- (France) Virginie Razzano

The following players received entry from the qualifying draw:

- (Belgium) Ysaline Bonaventure
- (Germany) Tamara Korpatsch
- (Australia) Olivia Rogowska
- (Mexico) Renata Zarazúa

The following player received entry from a protected ranking:

- (Austria) Tamira Paszek

== Champions ==
=== Singles ===
- (Germany) Carina Witthöft def. (Germany) Tatjana Maria, 7–5, 6–1

=== Doubles ===
- (United Kingdom) Johanna Konta / (France) Laura Thorpe def. (United Kingdom) Jocelyn Rae / (United Kingdom) Anna Smith, 1–6, 6–4, [10–5]
