= 2016 Engie Open de Cagnes-sur-Mer Alpes-Maritimes =

- Date: 2–8 May
- Edition: 19th
- Category: ITF Women's Circuit
- Prize money: $100,000
- Surface: Clay
- Location: Cagnes-sur-Mer, France

Champions

Singles
- (Poland) Magda Linette

Doubles
- (Romania) Andreea Mitu / (Netherlands) Demi Schuurs
← 2015 ·	Engie Open de Cagnes-sur-Mer Alpes-Maritimes	· 2017 →

The 2016 Engie Open de Cagnes-sur-Mer Alpes-Maritimes was a professional tennis tournament played on outdoor clay courts. It was the nineteenth edition of the tournament and part of the 2016 ITF Women's Circuit, offering a total of $100,000 in prize money. It took place in Cagnes-sur-Mer, France, on 2–8 May 2016.

== Singles main draw entrants ==
=== Seeds ===
Country	Player	Rank^{1}	Seed
GER	Carina Witthöft	85	1
KAZ	Zarina Diyas	94	2
FRA	Pauline Parmentier	102	3
POL	Magda Linette	104	4
SUI	Stefanie Vögele	105	5
GER	Tatjana Maria	107	6
ROU	Andreea Mitu	110	7
RUS	Elizaveta Kulichkova	114	8

- ^{1} Rankings as of 25 April 2016.

=== Other entrants ===
The following players received wildcards into the singles main draw:

- (France) Manon Arcangioli
- (France) Irina Ramialison
- (France) Fiona Ferro

The following players received entry from the qualifying draw:

- (Denmark) Karen Barritza
- (Georgia (country)) Ekaterine Gorgodze
- (Czech Republic) Karolína Muchová
- (Spain) Olga Sáez Larra

The following players received entry by a lucky loser spot:

- (Brazil) Beatriz Haddad Maia
- (Germany) Tamara Korpatsch
- (France) Anaïs van Cauter

== Champions ==
=== Singles ===
- (Poland) Magda Linette def. (Germany) Carina Witthöft, 6–3, 7–5

=== Doubles ===
- (Romania) Andreea Mitu / (Netherlands) Demi Schuurs def. (Switzerland) Xenia Knoll / (Serbia) Aleksandra Krunić, 6–4, 7–5
