= Silvia Njirić =

Croatian tennis player (born 1993)

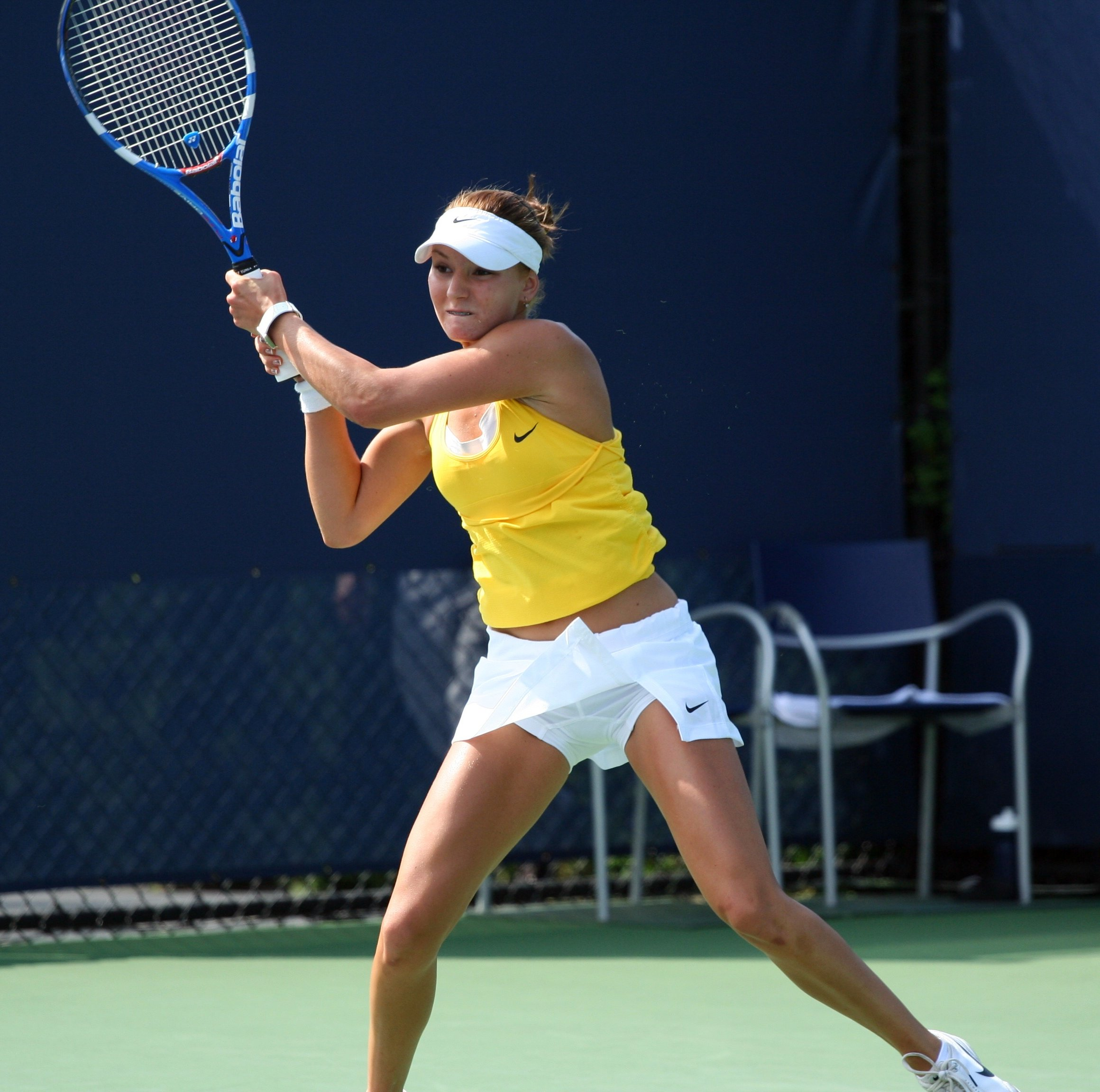
- Silvia Njirić at the 2009 US Open
- Country (sports): Croatia
- Residence: Zagreb, Croatia
- Born: 9 July 1993 (age 33) Zagreb
- Height: 1.63 m (5 ft 4 in)
- Plays: Right (two-handed backhand)
- Prize money: $97,645

Singles
- Career record: 273–232
- Career titles: 7 ITF
- Highest ranking: No. 370 (4 May 2015)

Doubles
- Career record: 52–43
- Career titles: 14 ITF
- Highest ranking: No. 290 (23 July 2012)

Team competitions
- Fed Cup: 1–8

Silvia Njirić (born 9 July 1993) is an inactive Croatian tennis player.

== Career ==
Having already played in Fed Cup for Croatia, Njirić made semifinals at the 2010 Junior French Open, losing to Elina Svitolina.

In her career, she won seven singles and 14 doubles titles on the ITF Women's Circuit. On 4 May 2015, she reached her best singles ranking of world No. 370. On 23 July 2012, she peaked at No. 290 in WTA the doubles rankings.

Njirić has not competed on the circuit since September 2023.

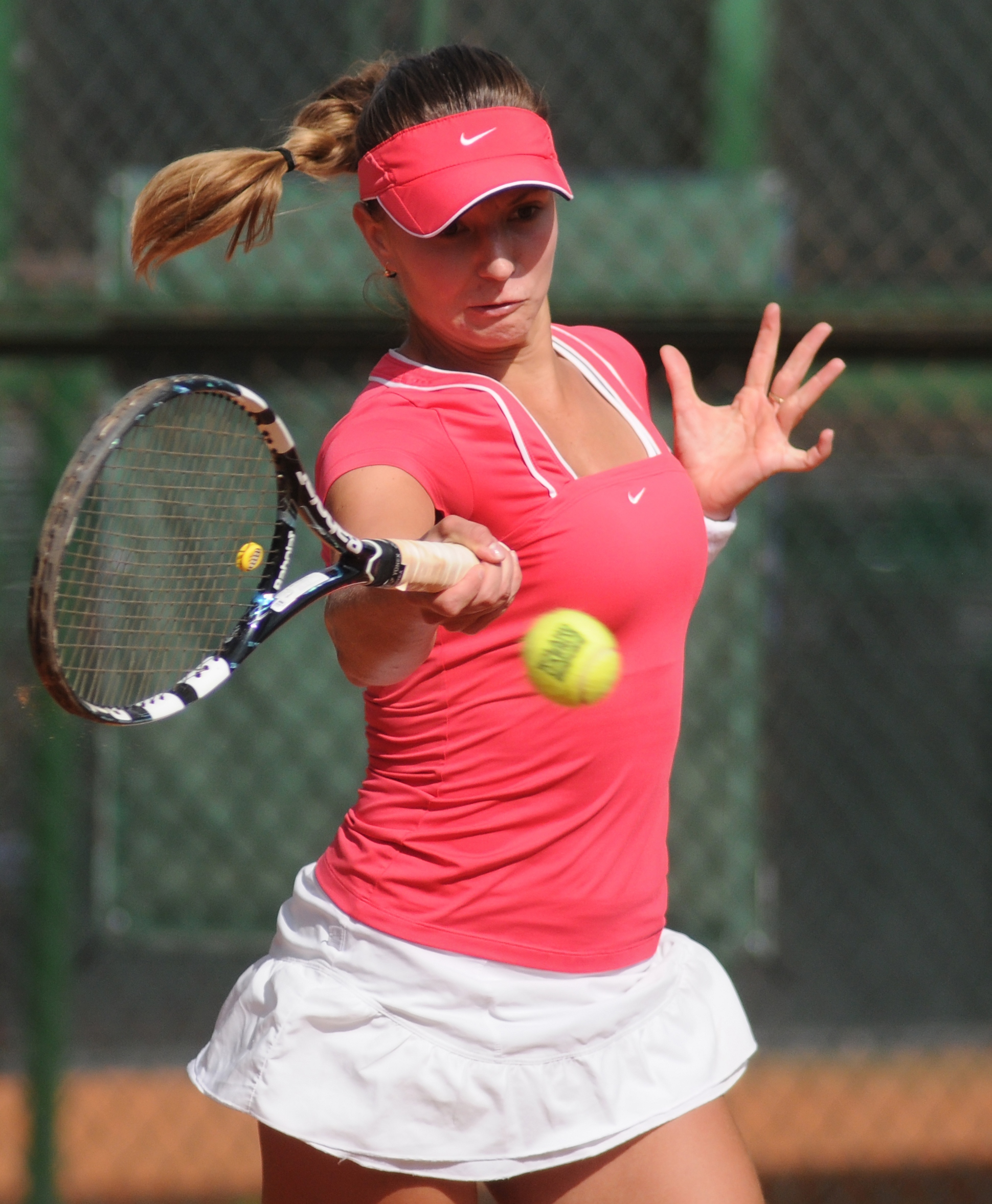
Silvia Njirić in 2014

== ITF Circuit finals ==
Legend
$50,000 tournaments
$25,000 tournaments
$10/15,000 tournaments

Finals by surface	Singles	Doubles
Hard	2–2	5–5
Clay	3–3	8–5
Carpet	2–0	1–1

=== Singles: 12 (7 titles, 5 runner-ups) ===
Result	W–L	Date	Tournament	Tier	Surface	Opponent	Score
Win	1–0	Oct 2010	ITF Algiers, Algeria	10k	Clay	(Morocco) Fatima El Allami	3–6, 6–3, 6–1
Loss	1–1	May 2011	ITF Velenje, Slovenia	10k	Clay	(Germany) Scarlett Werner	2–6, 2–6
Win	2–1	Apr 2012	ITF Heraklion, Greece	10k	Carpet	(Serbia) Tamara Čurović	6–3, 6–4
Win	3–1	Apr 2012	ITF Heraklion, Greece	10k	Carpet	(Italy) Angelica Moratelli	6–4, 7–6
Win	4–1	Nov 2014	ITF Casablanca, Morocco	10k	Clay	(France) Amandine Cazeaux	6–1, 6–4
Win	5–1	Apr 2015	ITF Antalya, Turkey	10k	Hard	(China) Lu Jiajing	6–1, 2–6, 7–5
Win	6–1	Feb 2016	ITF Wirral, UK	10k	Hard (i)	(Belgium) Klaartje Liebens	3–6, 7–6^{(2)}, 6–3
Loss	6–2	Oct 2018	ITF Monastir, Tunisia	15k	Hard	(France) Constance Sibille	4–6, 4–6
Loss	6–3	Oct 2018	ITF Monastir, Tunisia	15k	Hard	(Czech Republic) Nikola Tomanová	5–7, 3–6
Win	7–3	Sep 2019	Vrnjačka Banja Open, Serbia	15k	Clay	(Romania) Oana Gavrilă	6–0, 6–3
Loss	7–4	Sep 2019	ITF Székesfehérvár, Hungary	15k	Clay	(Bosnia and Herzegovina) Nefisa Berberović	6–4, 4–6, 5–7
Loss	7–5	Jan 2020	ITF Antalya, Turkey	15k	Clay	(Russia) Valeriya Olyanovskaya	0–6, 2–6

=== Doubles: 25 (14 titles, 11 runner-ups) ===
Result	W–L	Date	Tournament	Tier	Surface	Partner	Opponents	Score
Win	1–0	Aug 2011	ITF Brčko, Bosnia & Herzegovina	10,000	Clay	(Slovakia) Zuzana Zlochová	(Italy) Nicole Clerico (Italy) Maria Masini	6–4, 6–3
Win	2–0	Aug 2011	ITF Vinkovci, Croatia	10,000	Clay	(Croatia) Karla Popović	(Germany) Lisa Brinkmann (Russia) Maria Mokh	6–2, 6–3
Win	2–2	Nov 2011	ITF Équeurdreville, France	10,000	Hard	(France) Elixane Lechemia	(Belgium) Elyne Boeykens (Netherlands) Eva Wacanno	4–6, 4–6
Win	3–1	Apr 2012	ITF Heraklion, Greece	10,000	Carpet	(Czech Republic) Petra Krejsová	(Czech Republic) Dana Machálková (Czech Republic) Tereza Malíková	6–7^{(7)}, 6–3, [10–6]
Win	4–1	Apr 2012	ITF Rethymno, Greece	10,000	Hard	(Czech Republic) Petra Krejsová	(Greece) Adreanna Christopoulou (Greece) Irini Papageorgiou	3–6, 6–3, [10–7]
Loss	4–2	Jul 2012	Contrexéville Open, France	50,000	Clay	(Croatia) Tereza Mrdeža	(Ukraine) Yuliya Beygelzimer (Czech Republic) Renata Voráčová	1–6, 1–6
Loss	4–3	Feb 2013	ITF Kreuzlingen, Switzerland	10,000	Carpet (i)	(Croatia) Matea Mezak	(Switzerland) Timea Bacsinszky (Switzerland) Xenia Knoll	3–6, 2–6
Loss	4–4	May 2013	ITF Athens, Greece	10,000	Hard	(Croatia) Matea Mezak	(United States) Erin Clark (United Kingdom) Francesca Stephenson	7–5, 3–6, [8–10]
Loss	4–5	Jul 2013	Contrexéville Open, France	50,000	Clay	(Croatia) Ana Konjuh	(Argentina) Vanesa Furlanetto (France) Amandine Hesse	6–7^{(3)}, 4–6
Win	5–5	Aug 2014	ITF Pörtschach, Austria	10,000	Clay	(Croatia) Adrijana Lekaj	(Slovakia) Zuzana Luknárová (Slovakia) Karin Morgošová	6–1, 6–7, [10–4]
Loss	5–6	Nov 2014	ITF Casablanca, Morocco	10,000	Clay	(Italy) Martina Caciotti	(Spain) Olga Parres Azcoitia (Portugal) Inês Murta	3–6, 4–6
Loss	5–7	Nov 2014	ITF Casablanca, Morocco	10,000	Clay	(Croatia) Tea Faber	(Spain) Olga Parres Azcoitia (Spain) Georgina García Pérez	2–6, 4–6
Loss	5–8	Jan 2015	ITF Port El Kantaoui, Tunisia	10,000	Hard	(Spain) Olga Parres Azcoitia	(Bulgaria) Isabella Shinikova (Slovakia) Chantal Škamlová	2–6, 0–6
Win	6–8	Sep 2015	ITF Bol, Croatia	10,000	Clay	(Croatia) Adrijana Lekaj	(Hungary) Anna Bondár (Hungary) Rebeka Stolmar	6–4, 7–5
Win	7–8	Mar 2016	ITF Mâcon, France	10,000	Hard (i)	(France) Manon Arcangioli	(Denmark) Emilie Francati (Belarus) Vera Lapko	7–5, 7–6^{(5)}
Loss	7–9	Sep 2016	ITF Clermont-Ferrand, France	25,000	Hard (i)	(France) Manon Arcangioli	(Spain) Georgina García Pérez (Spain) Olga Sáez Larra	2–6, 6–3, [2–10]
Win	8–9	Oct 2018	ITF Monastir, Tunisia	15,000	Hard	(Italy) Miriana Tona	(Algeria) Amira Benaïssa (Malta) Elaine Genovese	1–6, 7–6^{(2)}, [10–4]
Loss	8–10	Oct 2018	ITF Monastir, Tunisia	15,000	Hard	(Poland) Joanna Zawadzka	(Czech Republic) Kristyna Hrabalová (Czech Republic) Nikola Tomanová	2–6, 6–3, [9–11]
Win	9–10	Dec 2018	ITF Monastir, Tunisia	15,000	Hard	(Serbia) Tamara Čurović	(Switzerland) Nicole Gadient (United States) Chiara Scholl	7–6^{(2)}, 4–6, [10–6]
Win	10–10	Mar 2019	ITF Tabarka, Tunisia	15,000	Clay	(Bulgaria) Julia Stamatova	(France) Vinciane Remy (France) Marie Témin	6–3, 6–3
Win	11–10	Jun 2019	ITF Akko, Israel	25,000	Hard	(Turkey) İpek Soylu	(Israel) Shelly Bereznyak (Kazakhstan) Yekaterina Dmitrichenko	6–2, 6–0
Win	12–10	Oct 2019	ITF Tabarka, Tunisia	15,000	Clay	(Bosnia and Herzegovina) Nefisa Berberović	(Switzerland) Nicole Gadient (Belgium) Chelsea Vanhoutte	6–0, 6–3
Win	13–10	Oct 2019	ITF Tabarka, Tunisia	15,000	Clay	(Bosnia and Herzegovina) Nefisa Berberović	(Ukraine) Ganna Poznikhirenko (Germany) Julyette Steur	7–6^{(5)}, 6–4
Loss	13–11	Jan 2020	ITF Antalya, Turkey	15,000	Clay	(Italy) Martina Colmegna	(Romania) Georgia Crăciun (Romania) Andreea Prisăcariu	5–7, 5–7
Win	14–11	Sep 2020	Zagreb Ladies Open, Croatia	25,000	Clay	(Serbia) Dejana Radanović	(Greece) Valentini Grammatikopoulou (Mexico) Ana Sofía Sánchez	4–6, 7–5, [10–8]

== Junior Grand Slam tournament finals ==
=== Doubles: 2 (2 runner-ups) ===
Result	Year	Tournament	Surface	Partner	Opponents	Score
Loss	2009	Wimbledon	Grass	(France) Kristina Mladenovic	(Thailand) Noppawan Lertcheewakarn (Australia) Sally Peers	1–6, 1–6
Loss	2010	US Open	Hard	(Belgium) An-Sophie Mestach	(Hungary) Tímea Babos (United States) Sloane Stephens	walkover

== Fed Cup participation ==
=== Singles ===
Edition	Stage	Date	Location	Against	Surface	Opponent	W/L	Score
2010 Fed Cup; Europe/Africa Zone Group I	R/R	5 February 2010	Lisbon, Portugal	Switzerland	Hard (i)	(Switzerland) Amra Sadiković	L	6–7^{(3–7)}, 1–6
2010 Fed Cup; Europe/Africa Zone Group I	P/O	6 February 2010	Lisbon, Portugal	Belarus	Hard (i)	(Belarus) Tatiana Poutchek	L	2–6, 0–6
2011 Fed Cup; Europe/Africa Zone Group I	P/O	5 February 2011	Eilat, Israel	(United Kingdom) Great Britain	Hard	(United Kingdom) Heather Watson	L	2–6, 5–7
2016 Fed Cup; Europe/Africa Zone Group I	P/O	6 February 2016	Eilat, Israel	Portugal	Hard	(Portugal) Maria João Koehler	W	6–4, 6–3

=== Doubles ===
Edition	Stage	Date	Location	Against	Surface	Partner	Opponents	W/L	Score
2010 Fed Cup; Europe/Africa Zone Group I	R/R	3 February 2010	Lisbon, Portugal	Portugal	Hard (i)	(Croatia) Jelena Kostanić Tošić	(Portugal) Michelle Larcher de Brito (Portugal) Neuza Silva	L	5–7, 4–6
2010 Fed Cup; Europe/Africa Zone Group I	R/R	5 February 2010	Lisbon, Portugal	Switzerland	Hard (i)	(Croatia) Ajla Tomljanović	(Switzerland) Sarah Moundir (Switzerland) Patty Schnyder	L	1–2, retired
2010 Fed Cup; Europe/Africa Zone Group I	P/O	6 February 2010	Lisbon, Portugal	Belarus	Hard (i)	(Croatia) Ajla Tomljanović	(Belarus) Ekaterina Dzehalevich (Belarus) Tatiana Poutchek	L	1–6, 1–6
2011 Fed Cup; Europe/Africa Zone Group I	R/R	2 February 2011	Eilat, Israel	Greece	Hard	(Croatia) Ani Mijačika	(Greece) Eleni Daniilidou (Greece) Eirini Georgatou	L	3–6, 6–2, 2–6
2011 Fed Cup; Europe/Africa Zone Group I	R/R	3 February 2011	Eilat, Israel	Belarus	Hard	(Croatia) Ajla Tomljanović	(Belarus) Darya Kustova (Belarus) Tatiana Poutchek	L	2–6, 4–6
