= Vanesa Furlanetto =

Argentine tennis player

- Country (sports): Argentina
- Born: 19 February 1987 (age 38); Argentina
- Prize money: $98,315

Singles
- Career record: 305–177
- Career titles: 13 ITF
- Highest ranking: No. 312 (18 November 2013)

Doubles
- Career record: 192–147
- Career titles: 13 ITF
- Highest ranking: No. 248 (26 May 2014)

Vanesa Furlanetto (Spanish pronunciation: [baˈnesa fuɾlaˈneto]; born 19 February 1987) is an Argentine former tennis player.

In her career, she won 13 singles titles and 13 doubles titles on the ITF Women's Circuit. On 18 November 2013, she reached her best singles ranking of world No. 312. On 26 May 2014, she peaked at No. 248 in the doubles rankings.

Partnering Amandine Hesse, Furlanetto won her first $50k tournament at Contrexéville, defeating Ana Konjuh and Silvia Njirić in the final.

In July 2015, she played her last match on the pro circuit.

== ITF Circuit finals ==
=== Singles: 23 (13 titles, 10 runner-ups) ===
Legend $25,000 tournaments $10,000 tournaments	Finals by surface Hard (1–4) Clay (12–6)

Result	No.	Date	Tournament	Surface	Opponent	Score
Win	1.	15 October 2006	ITF Córdoba, Argentina	Clay	(Brazil) Teliana Pereira	1–6, 6–1, 7–5
Loss	1.	29 July 2007	ITF Arad, Romania	Clay	(Argentina) Andrea Benítez	6–3, 5–7, 3–6
Loss	2.	30 August 2008	ITF Buenos Aires, Argentina	Clay	(Argentina) Verónica Spiegel	4–6, 0–6
Win	2.	25 October 2008	ITF Lima, Peru	Clay	(Venezuela) Marina Giral Lores	6–4, 2–6, 6–4
Win	3.	29 November 2008	ITF Buenos Aires, Argentina	Clay	(Peru) Bianca Botto	3–1 ret.
Loss	3.	28 August 2010	ITF Buenos Aires, Argentina	Clay	(Argentina) Mailen Auroux	2–6, 5–7
Loss	4.	4 September 2010	ITF Santa Fe, Argentina	Clay	(Chile) Camila Silva	6–1, 3–6, 6–7^{(7–9)}
Win	4.	11 September 2010	ITF Buenos Aires, Argentina	Clay	(Argentina) Carla Lucero	6–3, 6–2
Loss	5.	2 October 2010	ITF Arujá, Brazil	Clay	(Brazil) Teliana Pereira	6–4, 4–6, 1–6
Win	5.	7 November 2010	ITF Cariló, Argentina	Clay	(Argentina) Carla Lucero	6–3, 6–3
Win	6.	13 November 2010	ITF Asunción, Paraguay	Clay	(Paraguay) Verónica Cepede Royg	1–6, 6–4, 7–5
Loss	6.	21 May 2011	ITF Itaparica, Brazil	Hard	(Argentina) Andrea Benítez	2–6, 3–6
Loss	7.	11 June 2011	ITF Rosario, Argentina	Hard	(Argentina) Jorgelina Cravero	6–4, 3–6, 4–6
Win	7.	18 June 2011	ITF Santa Fe, Argentina	Clay	(Argentina) Aranza Salut	7–5, 6–3
Loss	8.	25 March 2012	ITF Metepec, Mexico	Hard	(Slovakia) Zuzana Zlochová	3–6, 5–7
Win	8.	1 April 2012	ITF Puebla, Mexico	Hard	(United States) Elizabeth Ferris	6–3, 6–3
Win	9.	7 April 2012	ITF Villa María, Argentina	Clay	(Peru) Patricia Kú Flores	6–3, 6–4
Loss	9.	8 September 2012	ITF Buenos Aires, Argentina	Clay	(Chile) Fernanda Brito	6–4, 6–7^{(5–7)}, 4–6
Win	10.	24 November 2012	ITF Temuco, Chile	Clay	(Bolivia) María Fernanda Álvarez Terán	6–3, 1–0 ret.
Loss	10.	3 March 2013	ITF Sharm El Sheikh, Egypt	Hard	(Croatia) Adrijana Lekaj	6–4, 6–7^{(8–10)}, 1–6
Win	11.	14 September 2013	ITF Buenos Aires, Argentina	Clay	(Argentina) Carolina Zeballos	6–4, 6–4
Win	12.	21 September 2013	ITF Rosario, Argentina	Clay	(Chile) Fernanda Brito	6–2, 6–1
Win	13.	9 November 2013	ITF Buenos Aires, Argentina	Clay	(Argentina) Catalina Pella	7–6^{(7–5)}, 3–6, 7–6^{(7–4)}

=== Doubles: 27 (13 titles, 14 runner-ups) ===
Legend $50,000 tournaments $25,000 tournaments $15,000 tournaments $10,000 tournaments	Finals by surface Hard (2–5) Clay (11–9) Grass (0–0) Carpet (0–0)

Result	No.	Date	Tournament	Surface	Partner	Opponents	Score
Loss	1.	2 September 2006	ITF Bogotá, Colombia	Clay	(Argentina) María Irigoyen	(Colombia) Mariana Duque (Colombia) Viky Núñez Fuentes	4–6, 2–6
Loss	2.	21 July 2007	ITF Craiova, Romania	Clay	(Argentina) Mailen Auroux	(Argentina) Andrea Benítez (Argentina) María Irigoyen	3–6, 4–6
Win	1.	12 April 2008	ITF Los Mochis, Mexico	Clay	(Chile) Andrea Koch Benvenuto	(Croatia) Indire Akiki (United States) Allie Will	6–0, 7–5
Loss	3.	14 June 2008	ITF Montemor-o-Novo, Portugal	Hard	(Argentina) Carla Beltrami	(Canada) Mélanie Gloria (Spain) Lucía Sainz	1–6, 1–6
Loss	4.	22 August 2008	ITF Bell Ville, Argentina	Clay	(Argentina) Aranza Salut	(Argentina) Carla Beltrami (Argentina) Tatiana Búa	w/o
Loss	5.	31 October 2008	ITF Lima, Peru	Clay	(Chile) Andrea Koch Benvenuto	(Peru) Bianca Botto (Colombia) Karen Castiblanco	1–6, 3–6
Win	2.	22 November 2008	ITF Montevideo, Uruguay	Clay	(Uruguay) Estefanía Craciún	(Argentina) Carla Beltrami (United States) Nataly Yoo	6–1, 6–3
Loss	6.	27 March 2009	ITF Lima, Peru	Clay	(Colombia) Karen Castiblanco	(Slovakia) Patricia Verešová (Slovakia) Zuzana Zlochová	0–6, 7–5, [5–10]
Win	3.	20 November 2009	ITF Asunción, Paraguay	Clay	(Chile) Andrea Koch Benvenuto	(Brazil) Raquel Piltcher (Brazil) Roxane Vaisemberg	6–4, 2–6, [10–5]
Loss	7.	1 October 2010	ITF Aruja, Brazil	Clay	(Colombia) Karen Castiblanco	(Argentina) Carla Lucero (Argentina) Emilia Yorio	4–6, 6–4, [8–10]
Win	4.	1 November 2010	ITF Cariló, Argentina	Clay	(Chile) Camila Silva	(Argentina) Lucía Jara Lozano (Argentina) Luciana Sarmenti	6–2, 6–1
Win	5.	12 November 2010	ITF Asunción, Paraguay	Clay	(Paraguay) Verónica Cepede Royg	(Argentina) Luciana Sarmenti (Argentina) Carolina Zeballos	6–0, 6–3
Win	6.	19 November 2010	ITF Asunción, Paraguay	Clay	(Paraguay) Verónica Cepede Royg	(Argentina) Lucía Jara Lozano (Argentina) Luciana Sarmenti	6–2, 2–6, [10–3]
Loss	8.	10 June 2011	ITF Rosario, Argentina	Clay	(Argentina) Florencia di Biasi	(Argentina) Jorgelina Cravero (Argentina) Betina Jozami	2–6, 6–7^{(4–7)}
Win	7.	17 June 2011	ITF Santa Fe, Argentina	Clay	(Argentina) Florencia di Biasi	(Argentina) Betina Jozami (Argentina) Agustina Lepore	3–6, 6–4, [10–4]
Loss	9.	9 July 2011	ITF Valladolid, Spain	Hard	(Argentina) Aranza Salut	(Denmark) Malou Ejdesgaard (France) Victoria Larrière	0–6, 3–6
Loss	10.	30 July 2011	ITF Vigo, Spain	Hard	(Argentina) Aranza Salut	(Germany) Justine Ozga (Italy) Claudia Giovine	1–6, 3–6
Loss	11.	8 October 2011	ITF Madrid, Spain	Hard	(Argentina) Aranza Salut	(Germany) Kim Grajdek (Poland) Justyna Jegiołka	3–6, 3–6
Win	8.	14 April 2012	ITF Villa del Dique, Argentina	Clay	(Argentina) Aranza Salut	(Bolivia) María Fernanda Álvarez Terán (Argentina) Ornella Caron	w/o
Win	9.	24 January 2013	ITF Lima, Peru	Clay	(Brazil) Maria Fernanda Alves	(Peru) Patricia Kú Flores (Peru) Katherine Miranda Chang	6–1, 6–4
Win	10.	20 July 2013	Open Contrexéville, France	Clay	(France) Amandine Hesse	(Croatia) Ana Konjuh (Croatia) Silvia Njirić	7–6^{(7–3)}, 6–4
Loss	12.	27 July 2013	ITF Les Contamines-Montjoie, France	Hard	(France) Amandine Hesse	(Italy) Nicole Clerico (Czech Republic) Nikola Fraňková	6–3, 6–7^{(5–7)}, [8–10]
Loss	13.	13 September 2013	ITF Buenos Aires, Argentina	Clay	(Argentina) Carolina Zeballos	(Brazil) Flávia Guimarães Bueno (Argentina) Stephanie Petit	2–6, 4–6
Win	11.	20 September 2013	ITF Rosario, Argentina	Clay	(Argentina) Carolina Zeballos	(Argentina) Sofía Luini (Argentina) Guadalupe Pérez Rojas	7–6^{(7–2)}, 6–2
Loss	14.	11 October 2013	ITF Asunción, Paraguay	Clay	(Argentina) Carolina Zeballos	(Brazil) Laura Pigossi (Argentina) Florencia Molinero	7–5, 4–6, [8–10]
Win	12.	13 December 2013	ITF Mérida, Mexico	Hard	(Argentina) Florencia Molinero	(Romania) Laura-Ioana Andrei (Russia) Marina Melnikova	2–6, 7–6^{(10–8)}, [10–7]
Win	13.	8 August 2014	ITF Caracas, Venezuela	Hard	(Argentina) Florencia Molinero	(France) Clothilde de Bernardi (Japan) Ayaka Okuno	6–0, 6–0
