= Amra Sadiković =

Swiss tennis player (born 1989)

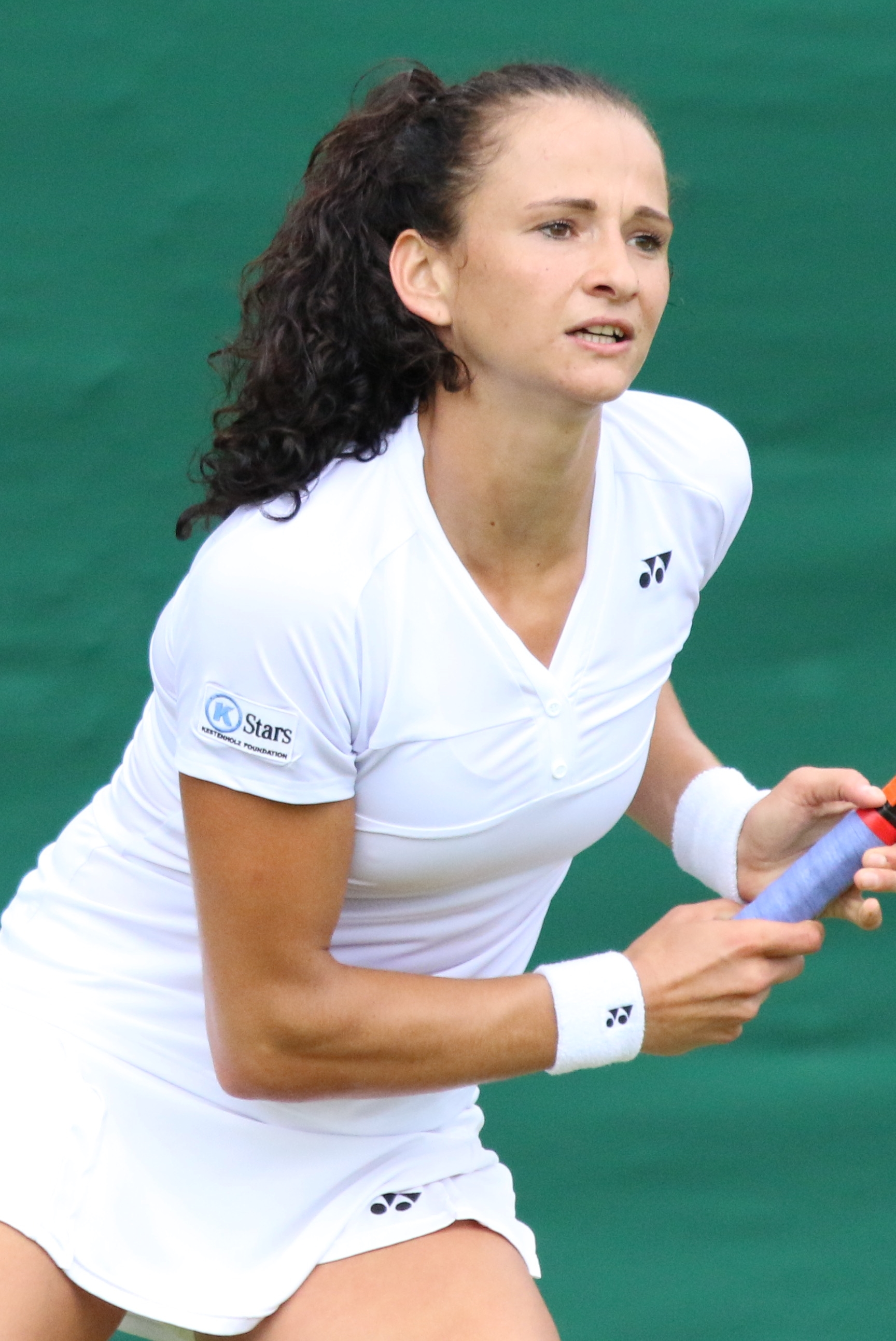
- Sadiković during the 2016 Wimbledon qualifying
- Country (sports): Switzerland
- Born: 6 May 1989 (age 36) Prilep, SFR Yugoslavia
- Height: 1.86 m (6 ft 1 in)
- Turned pro: 2009
- Retired: April 2019 (short comeback 2022)
- Coach: Jean-Claude Scherrer
- Prize money: $302,898

Singles
- Career record: 317–237
- Career titles: 8 ITF
- Highest ranking: No. 126 (18 July 2016)

Grand Slam singles results
- Australian Open: Q2 (2017)
- French Open: Q2 (2016)
- Wimbledon: 1R (2016)
- US Open: Q2 (2013)

Doubles
- Career record: 168–119
- Career titles: 15 ITF
- Highest ranking: No. 133 (2 January 2017)

Team competitions
- Fed Cup: 7–6

Amra Sadiković (Macedonian: Амра Садиковиќ; Bosnian pronunciation: [sadǐːkoʋitɕ]; born 6 May 1989) is a Swiss tennis player. She announced her retirement in May 2014, a few days after her 25th birthday, only to begin playing 13 months later on the ITF Women's Circuit again. In April 2019, Sadiković announced her second and permanent retirement from professional tennis. She had another comeback in October 2022 at Sharm El Sheik but only for two singles tournaments.

In her career, Sadiković won eight singles titles and 15 doubles titles on the ITF Circuit. On 18 July 2016, she reached her best singles ranking of world No. 126. On 10 October 2016, she peaked at No. 135 in the WTA doubles rankings.

In 2016, Sadiković made her major main-draw debut at Wimbledon. She won three rounds of qualifying before facing defending (and eventual) champion Serena Williams in the first round, where she lost in straight sets.

Sadiković has a win–loss record of 7–6 for Switzerland in Fed Cup competition.

== ITF finals ==
=== Singles: 13 (8 titles, 5 runner-ups) ===
Legend $50,000 tournaments $25,000 tournaments $10,000 tournaments	Finals by surface Hard (2–2) Clay (3–2) Carpet (3–1)

Outcome	No.	Date	Tournament	Surface	Opponent	Score
Winner	1.	16 June 2008	ITF Davos, Switzerland	Clay	(Slovakia) Michaela Pochabová	7–6^{(5)}, 7–6^{(3)}
Runner-up	1.	15 June 2009	ITF Lenzerheide, Switzerland	Clay	(Netherlands) Michelle Gerards	2–6, 5–7
Winner	2.	15 March 2010	ITF Wetzikon, Switzerland	Carpet (i)	(Germany) Nina Zander	7–5, 7–5
Winner	3.	16 August 2010	ITF Innsbruck, Austria	Clay	(New Zealand) Ellen Barry	6–4, 6–2
Runner-up	2.	14 February 2011	ITF Albufeira, Portugal	Hard	(Netherlands) Lesley Kerkhove	6–3, 5–7, 2–6
Runner-up	3.	20 June 2011	ITF Lenzerheide, Switzerland	Clay	(Croatia) Ani Mijačika	3–6, 6–3, 3–6
Winner	4.	31 October 2011	Toronto Challenger, Canada	Hard (i)	(Canada) Gabriela Dabrowski	6–4, 6–2
Winner	5.	28 November 2011	ITF Vendryně, Czech Republic	Hard (i)	(Czech Republic) Karolína Plíšková	5–7, 6–1, 7–6^{(5)}
Winner	6.	26 March 2012	ITF Fällanden, Switzerland	Carpet (i)	(Germany) Sarah-Rebecca Sekulic	6–3, 6–2
Winner	7.	30 April 2012	Chiasso Open, Switzerland	Clay	(Croatia) Tereza Mrdeža	6–3, 6–3
Winner	8.	12 November 2012	ITF Helsinki, Finland	Carpet (i)	(Slovakia) Anna Karolína Schmiedlová	6–4, 6–0
Runner-up	4.	19 October 2015	Challenger de Saguenay, Canada	Hard (i)	(Serbia) Jovana Jakšić	3–6, 7–6^{(5)}, 1–6
Runner-up	5.	22 February 2016	ITF Kreuzlingen, Switzerland	Carpet (i)	(Czech Republic) Kristýna Plíšková	6–7^{(4)}, 6–7^{(3)}

=== Doubles: 34 (15 titles, 19 runner-ups) ===
Legend $75/80,000 tournaments $50/60,000 tournaments $25,000 tournaments $10,000 tournaments	Finals by surface Hard (3–7) Clay (6–10) Carpet (6–2)

Outcome	No.	Date	Tournament	Surface	Partner	Opponents	Score
Runner-up	1.	26 September 2006	ITF Thessaloniki, Greece	Clay	(Switzerland) Stefanie Vögele	(Italy) Nicole Clerico (Russia) Alexandra Panova	4–6, 6–7^{(8)}
Runner-up	2.	11 June 2007	ITF Lenzerheide, Switzerland	Clay	(Germany) Paola Sprovieri	(Austria) Eva-Maria Hoch (Germany) Laura Siegemund	4–6, 3–6
Runner-up	3.	10 September 2007	ITF Innsbruck, Austria	Clay	(Switzerland) Karin Hechenberger	(Italy) Astrid Besser (Slovakia) Monika Kochanová	5–7, 5–7
Runner-up	4.	1 October 2007	ITF Castel Gandolfo, Italy	Clay	(Austria) Stefanie Haidner	(Italy) Stefania Chieppa (Italy) Giulia Gatto-Monticone	2–3 ret.
Winner	1.	14 April 2008	ITF Bol, Croatia	Clay	(United Kingdom) Naomi Broady	(Slovenia) Tina Obrez (Slovenia) Anja Prislan	6–4, 6–3
Runner-up	5.	14 September 2008	ITF Casale Monferrato, Italy	Clay	(Switzerland) Nicole Riner	(Portugal) Catarina Ferreira (Georgia (country)) Oksana Kalashnikova	5–7, 6–7^{(5)}
Runner-up	6.	15 June 2009	ITF Lenzerheide, Switzerland	Clay	(Switzerland) Xenia Knoll	(Netherlands) Michelle Gerards (Netherlands) Marcella Koek	3–6, 3–6
Winner	2.	22 June 2009	ITF Davos, Switzerland	Clay	(Switzerland) Xenia Knoll	(Netherlands) Marcella Koek (Italy) Lisa Sabino	7–5, 6–1
Runner-up	7.	20 July 2009	ITF Horb, Germany	Clay	(Slovenia) Anja Prislan	(Netherlands) Michelle Gerards (Netherlands) Marcella Koek	6–7^{(6)}, 1–6
Winner	3.	8 March 2010	ITF Buchen, Germany	Carpet (i)	(Ukraine) Irina Buryachok	(Czech Republic) Simona Dobrá (Czech Republic) Tereza Hladíková	7–5, 6–3
Winner	4.	15 March 2010	ITF Wetzikon, Switzerland	Carpet (i)	(Switzerland) Xenia Knoll	(Czech Republic) Simona Dobrá (Czech Republic) Tereza Hladíková	6–4, 7–6^{(5)}
Runner-up	8.	21 June 2010	ITF Davos, Switzerland	Clay	(Switzerland) Sarah Moundir	(United Kingdom) Amanda Elliott (Australia) Emelyn Starr	1–6, 2–6
Runner-up	9.	16 August 2010	ITF Innsbruck, Austria	Clay	(Switzerland) Xenia Knoll	(France) Victoria Larrière (France) Elixane Lechemia	w/o
Winner	5.	21 February 2011	ITF Portimão, Portugal	Hard	(Croatia) Ani Mijačika	(Russia) Ksenia Gospodinova (Germany) Dejana Raickovic	6–1, 7–6^{(4)}
Winner	6.	14 March 2011	ITF Fällanden, Switzerland	Carpet (i)	(Switzerland) Xenia Knoll	(Slovenia) Dalila Jakupović (Slovenia) Anja Prislan	6–3, 6–3
Winner	7.	4 April 2011	ITF Šibenik, Croatia	Clay	(Switzerland) Mateja Kraljevic	(Czech Republic) Simona Dobrá (Czech Republic) Tereza Hladíková	7–5, 6–3
Winner	8.	20 June 2011	ITF Lenzerheide, Switzerland	Clay	(Croatia) Ani Mijačika	(Austria) Nikola Hofmanova (Slovakia) Romana Tabak	4–6, 6–2, [10–4]
Winner	9.	26 March 2012	ITF Fällanden, Switzerland	Carpet (i)	(Switzerland) Xenia Knoll	(Switzerland) Lara Michel (United Kingdom) Emily Webley-Smith	6–7^{(3)}, 6–4, [12–10]
Winner	10.	22 October 2012	Ismaning Open, Germany	Carpet (i)	(Switzerland) Romina Oprandi	(United States) Jill Craybas (Czech Republic) Eva Hrdinová	4–6, 6–3, [10–7]
Runner-up	10.	5 November 2012	ITF Équeurdreville, France	Hard (i)	(Croatia) Ana Vrljić	(Poland) Magda Linette (Poland) Katarzyna Piter	4–6, 6–7^{(4)}
Winner	11.	21 January 2013	Open Andrézieux-Bouthéon, France	Hard (i)	(Croatia) Ana Vrljić	(Russia) Margarita Gasparyan (Ukraine) Olga Savchuk	5–7, 7–5, [10–4]
Runner-up	11.	4 March 2013	ITF Irapuato, Mexico	Hard	(Serbia) Aleksandra Krunić	(Russia) Alla Kudryavtseva (Ukraine) Olga Savchuk	6–4, 2–6, [6–10]
Runner-up	12.	17 February 2014	ITF Kreuzlingen, Switzerland	Carpet (i)	(Serbia) Aleksandra Krunić	(Czech Republic) Eva Birnerová (Netherlands) Michaëlla Krajicek	1–6, 6–4, [6–10]
Runner-up	13.	31 March 2014	ITF Edgbaston, England	Hard (i)	(Poland) Magda Linette	(United Kingdom) Jocelyn Rae (United Kingdom) Anna Smith	6–3, 5–7, [4–10]
Runner-up	14.	24 August 2015	ITF Mamaia, Romania	Clay	(Switzerland) Xenia Knoll	(Russia) Anastasiya Komardina (Georgia (country)) Sofia Shapatava	3–6, 7–5, [8–10]
Runner-up	15.	1 February 2016	Open de l'Isère, France	Hard (i)	(Belarus) Lidziya Marozava	(France) Manon Arcangioli (France) Alizé Lim	5–7, 2–6
Winner	12.	22 February 2016	ITF Kreuzlingen, Switzerland	Carpet (i)	(Germany) Antonia Lottner	(Croatia) Tena Lukas (United States) Bernarda Pera	5–7, 6–2, [10–5]
Winner	13.	24 June 2017	ITF Lenzerheide, Switzerland	Clay	(Switzerland) Nina Stadler	(Brazil) Gabriela Cé (Argentina) Catalina Pella	2–6, 6–4, [10–1]
Winner	14.	20 August 2017	Montreux Ladies Open, Switzerland	Clay	(Switzerland) Xenia Knoll	(Slovakia) Michaela Hončová (Bulgaria) Isabella Shinikova	6–2, 7–5
Runner-up	16.	24 September 2017	ITF Albuquerque, United States	Hard	(Switzerland) Viktorija Golubic	(Switzerland) Conny Perrin (United Kingdom) Tara Moore	3–6, 3–6
Runner-up	17.	1 October 2017	Templeton Pro Open, United States	Hard	(Switzerland) Viktorija Golubic	(United States) Kaitlyn Christian (Mexico) Giuliana Olmos	5–7, 3–6
Runner-up	18.	21 October 2017	ITF Florence, United States	Hard	(United Kingdom) Tara Moore	(United States) Maria Sanchez (United States) Taylor Townsend	1–6, 2–6
Winner	15.	9 February 2018	Open de l'Isère, France	Hard (i)	(Netherlands) Eva Wacanno	(France) Estelle Cascino (France) Elixane Lechemia	4–6, 6–1, [10–6]
Runner-up	19.	13 May 2018	Fukuoka International, Japan	Carpet	(United Kingdom) Tara Moore	(United Kingdom) Naomi Broady (United States) Asia Muhammad	2–6, 0–6
