= Irina Ramialison =

French tennis player

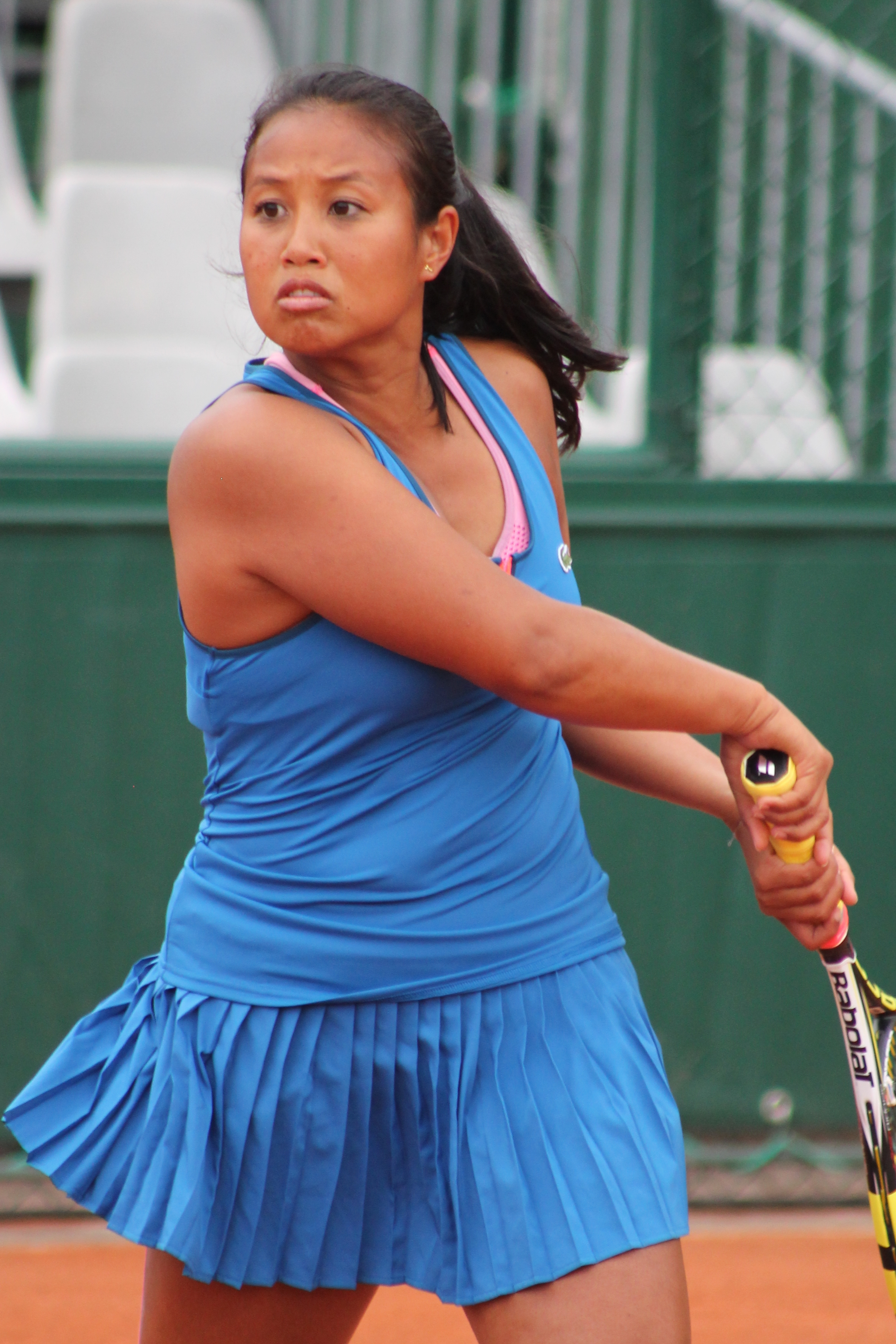
- Roland Garros, 2015
- Country (sports): France
- Residence: Blois, France
- Born: 9 June 1991 (age 35) Rennes, France
- Height: 1.58 m (5 ft 2 in)
- Plays: Right (two-handed backhand)
- Prize money: $173,293

Singles
- Career record: 316–219
- Career titles: 13 ITF
- Highest ranking: No. 243 (10 November 2014)

Grand Slam singles results
- French Open: Q2 (2014)

Doubles
- Career record: 83–112
- Career titles: 4 ITF
- Highest ranking: No. 196 (13 July 2015)

Grand Slam doubles results
- French Open: 1R (2014, 2015)

Irina Ramialison (born 9 June 1991) is a former tennis player from France.

On 10 November 2014, she reached a career-high singles ranking of world No. 243. On 13 July 2015, she peaked at No. 196 in the WTA doubles rankings. Since November 2024, she has not competed at any ITF tournaments.

== Career ==
=== 2014 ===
Ramialison received a wildcard for the women's doubles tournament at the 2014 French Open alongside Constance Sibille; they lost in the first round to Madison Keys and Alison Riske. Ramialison also received a wildcard for the singles qualifying of that tournament, only dropping a single game to beat Kristína Kučová in the first round, before falling in the second to Michelle Larcher de Brito in straight sets.

=== 2023–2024 ===
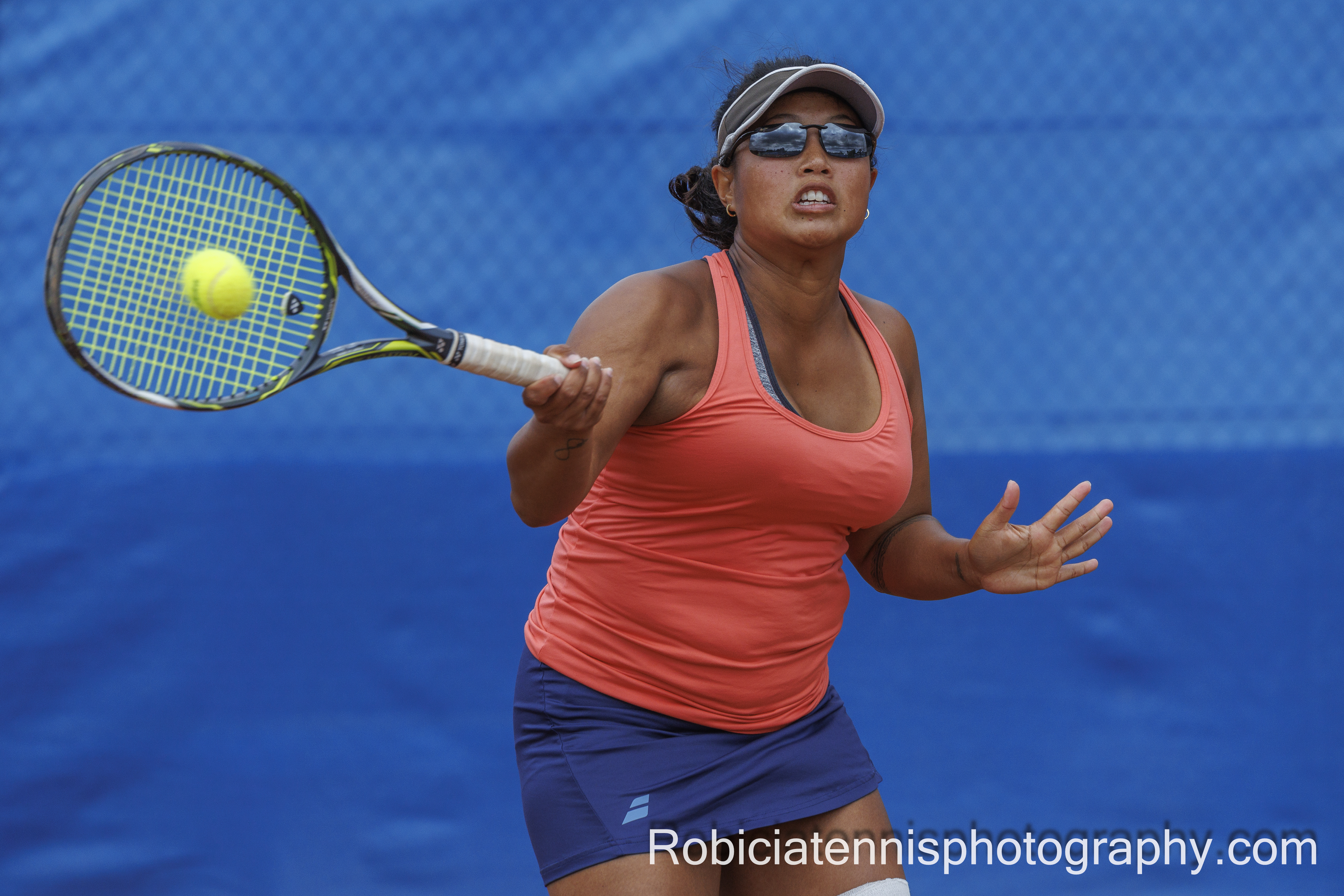
Claycourt International, Canberra

After having not played since the 2020 French Open, Ramialison made a return to professional tennis at the $60k Burnie International in Australia but fell in the first round to German player Ella Seidel.

Her last appearance on the circuit was in October 2024 at the W50 tournament in Nantes, France where she failed in the qualifying.

== ITF Circuit finals ==
=== Singles: 18 (13 titles, 5 runner-ups) ===
Legend $25,000 tournaments $15,000 tournaments $10,000 tournaments	Finals by surface Hard (9–3) Clay (4–2)

Result	W–L	Date	Tournament	Surface	Opponent	Score
Win	1–0	Oct 2009	ITF Les Franqueses del Vallès, Spain	Hard	(France) Cindy Chala	3–6, 6–4, 6–4
Win	2–0	Oct 2009	ITF Pretoria, South Africa	Hard	(Finland) Piia Suomalainen	7–5, 6–2
Loss	2–1	Aug 2012	ITF Westende, Belgium	Hard	(Israel) Deniz Khazaniuk	4–6, 6–2, 6–7^{(5)}
Win	3–1	Dec 2012	ITF Antalya, Turkey	Clay	(Bulgaria) Isabella Shinikova	6–1, 2–6, 6–0
Win	4–1	Jan 2014	ITF Fort-de-France, Martinique	Hard	(France) Shérazad Reix	6–4, 6–2
Win	5–1	Oct 2014	ITF Phuket, Thailand	Hard (i)	(China) Xun Fangying	6–4, 5–7, 6–4
Win	6–1	Nov 2014	ITF Phuket, Thailand	Hard (i)	(United Kingdom) Katie Boulter	6–3, 6–0
Win	7–1	Mar 2015	ITF Solarino, Italy	Hard	(Italy) Martina Caregaro	6–1, 6–7, 6–4
Loss	7–2	Mar 2015	ITF Solarino, Italy	Hard	(Italy) Cristiana Ferrando	3–6, 3–6
Loss	7–3	Jul 2015	ITF Denain, France	Clay	(Spain) Paula Badosa	5–7, 0–6
Win	8–3	Jan 2016	ITF Fort-de-France	Hard	(Czech Republic) Marie Bouzková	7–6^{(3)}, 6–2
Win	9–3	Jan 2016	ITF Saint Martin, Guadeloupe	Hard	(Netherlands) Kelly Versteeg	6–1, 6–0
Loss	9–4	Jul 2016	ITF Denain, France	Clay	(Argentina) Nadia Podoroska	3–6, 7–5, 4–6
Win	10–4	Nov 2017	ITF Heraklion, Greece	Clay	(Switzerland) Ylena In-Albon	6–1, 6–4
Win	11–4	Jan 2018	ITF Petit-Bourg, Guadeloupe	Hard	(Switzerland) Leonie Küng	6–3, 7–5
Win	12–4	May 2018	ITF Karlskrona, Sweden	Clay	(Denmark) Karen Barritza	5–7, 7–5, 6–0
Win	13–4	Jun 2018	ITF Maribor, Slovenia	Clay	(China) Wang Xinyu	6–2, 6–7^{(3)}, 7–5
Loss	13–5	Mar 2020	ITF Perth, Australia	Hard	(Japan) Shiho Akita	3–6, 3–6

=== Doubles: 10 (4 titles, 6 runner-ups) ===
Legend
$100,000 tournaments
$50,000 tournaments
$25,000 tournaments
$15,000 tournaments
$10,000 tournaments

Result	W–L	Date	Tournament	Surface	Partner	Opponents	Score
Win	1–0	Jan 2010	ITF Grenoble, France	Hard (i)	(France) Victoria Larrière	(United States) Mallory Cecil (United States) Megan Moulton-Levy	6–3, 6–4
Loss	1–1	Jan 2011	ITF Le Gosier, France	Hard (i)	(France) Amandine Cazeaux	(United States) Amanda McDowell (Norway) Nina Munch-Søgaard	0–6, 5–7
Win	2–1	Aug 2011	ITF Istanbul, Turkey	Hard	(Bulgaria) Isabella Shinikova	(Ukraine) Khristina Kazimova (Germany) Christina Shakovets	3–6, 6–1, [10–8]
Loss	2–2	Jan 2012	ITF Sutton, United Kingdom	Hard (i)	(France) Elixane Lechemia	(Republic of Ireland) Amy Bowtell (Netherlands) Quirine Lemoine	6–7^{(5)}, 3–6
Loss	2–3	Jun 2013	Bredeney Ladies Open, Germany	Clay	(France) Constance Sibille	(Russia) Eugeniya Pashkova (Ukraine) Anastasiya Vasylyeva	5–7, 4–6
Win	3–3	Sep 2014	ITF Clermont-Ferrand, France	Hard (i)	(Germany) Nina Zander	(France) Fanny Caramaro (France) Victoria Muntean	6–1, 6–0
Loss	3–4	Feb 2015	ITF Kreuzlingen, Switzerland	Carpet (i)	(France) Stéphanie Foretz	(Ukraine) Lyudmyla Kichenok (Ukraine) Nadiia Kichenok	3–6, 3–6
Loss	3–5	Jul 2015	Contrexéville Open, France	Clay	(France) Constance Sibille	(Georgia (country)) Oksana Kalashnikova (Montenegro) Danka Kovinić	6–2, 3–6, [6–10]
Loss	3–6	Jun 2018	ITF Maribor, Slovenia	Clay	(France) Constance Sibille	(Czech Republic) Michaela Bayerlová (Kosovo) Adrijana Lekaj	6–7^{(2)}, 5–7
Win	4–6	Feb 2019	ITF Perth, Australia	Hard	(United States) Jennifer Elie	(Japan) Haine Ogata (Japan) Aiko Yoshitomi	7–5, 6–4
