= Constance Sibille =

French tennis player (born 1990)

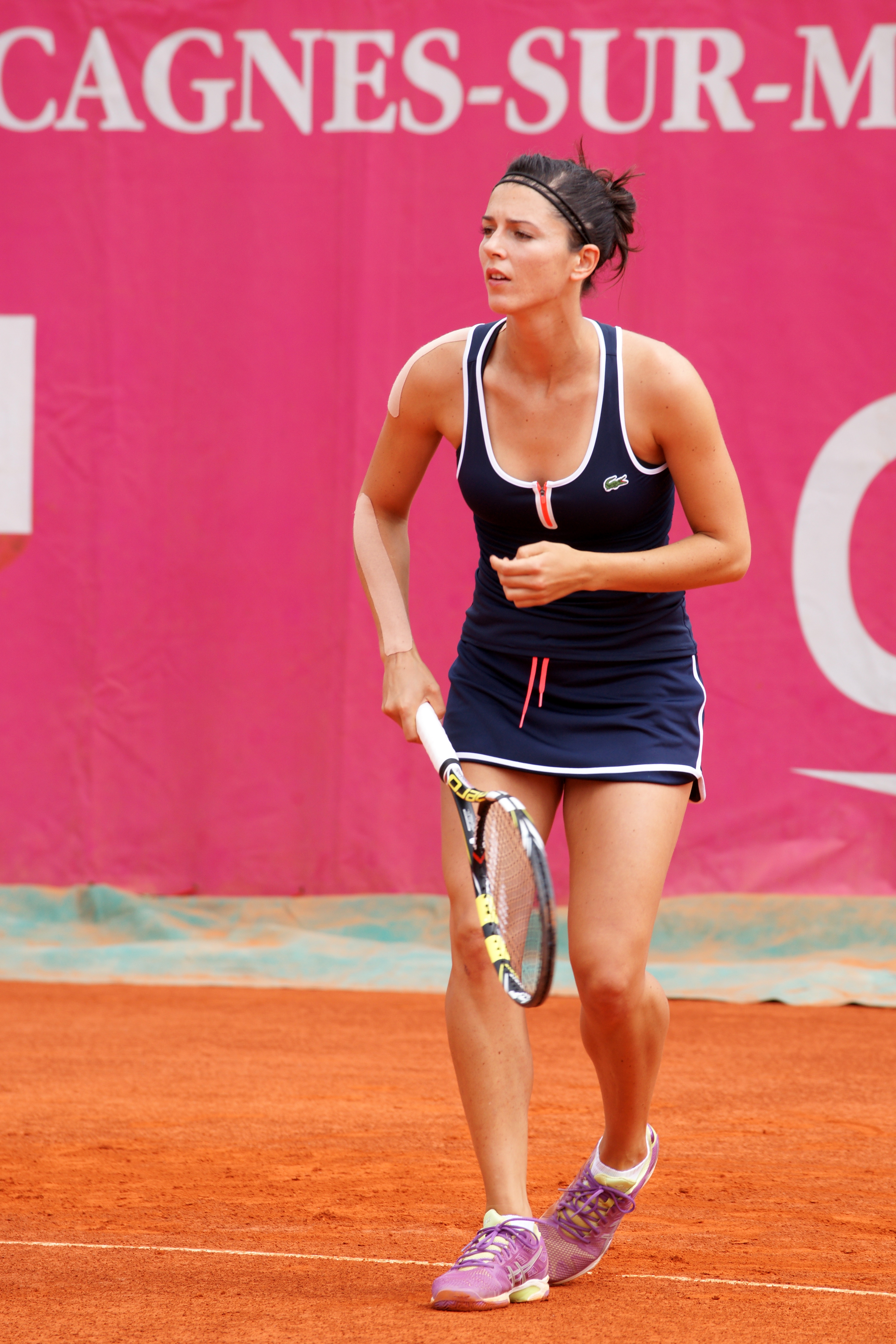
- Sibille at the 2015 Open de Cagnes-sur-Mer
- Country (sports): France
- Residence: Metz, France
- Born: 9 November 1990 (age 35) Sarreguemines, France
- Plays: Right (two-handed backhand)
- Prize money: $117,569

Singles
- Career record: 284–221
- Career titles: 5 ITF
- Highest ranking: No. 265 (7 July 2014)

Grand Slam singles results
- French Open: Q1 (2014)

Doubles
- Career record: 61–87
- Career titles: 1 ITF
- Highest ranking: No. 244 (27 July 2015)

Grand Slam doubles results
- French Open: 1R (2014, 2015)

Constance Sibille (born 9 November 1990) is a French former professional tennis player.

On 7 July 2014, Sibille reached a career-high singles ranking of world No. 265. On 27 July 2015, she peaked at No. 244 in the doubles rankings.

During her career, Sibille had wins over players like Ons Jabeur, Kiki Bertens, Ekaterina Alexandrova, Yulia Putintseva, Vera Dushevina, Catalina Castaño, Alison Van Uytvanck, Annika Beck, Fiona Ferro, Tereza Martincová, Océane Dodin or Anne Keothavong.

== Career highlights ==
She received a wildcard to play in the doubles draw at the 2014 French Open, alongside Irina Ramialison. The pair lost to Madison Keys and Alison Riske in the first round, in three sets. The following year, Sibille and Ramialison again lost in the first round, this time to the eventual winners, Bethanie Mattek-Sands and Lucie Safarová, despite having one set point in the first set.

== ITF Circuit finals ==
=== Singles: 10 (5 titles, 5 runner-ups) ===
Legend $15,000 tournaments $10,000 tournaments	Finals by surface Hard (2–2) Clay (3–3)

Result	W–L	Date	Tournament	Tier	Surface	Opponent	Score
Loss	0–1	Sep 2006	ITF Limoges, France	10,000	Hard (i)	(France) Audrey Bergot	6–4, 4–6, 1–6
Loss	0–2	Jan 2009	ITF Wrexham, United Kingdom	10,000	Hard (i)	(Luxembourg) Claudine Schaul	1–6, 6–3, 4–6
Loss	0–3	Aug 2009	ITF Rebecq, Belgium	10,000	Clay	(Netherlands) Richèl Hogenkamp	6–4, 3–6, 4–6
Win	1–3	Nov 2009	ITF Équeurdreville, France	10,000	Hard (i)	(Germany) Annika Beck	6–4, 6–2
Win	2–3	Jul 2010	ITF Brussels, Belgium	10,000	Clay	(Austria) Katharina Negrin	6–2, 6–1
Win	3–3	Aug 2011	ITF Rebecq, Belgium	10,000	Clay	(Bulgaria) Martina Gledacheva	6–3, 6–1
Win	4–3	Sep 2014	ITF Bol, Croatia	10,000	Clay	(Croatia) Iva Mekovec	6–4, 6–4
Loss	4–4	Jul 2016	ITF Saint-Gervais-les-Bains, France	10,000	Clay	(United States) Chiara Scholl	2–6, 2–6
Win	5–4	Oct 2018	ITF Monastir, Tunisia	15,000	Hard	(Croatia) Silvia Njirić	6–4, 6–4
Loss	5–5	Sep 2019	ITF Tabarka, Tunisia	15,000	Clay	(Switzerland) Karin Kennel	2–6, 4–6

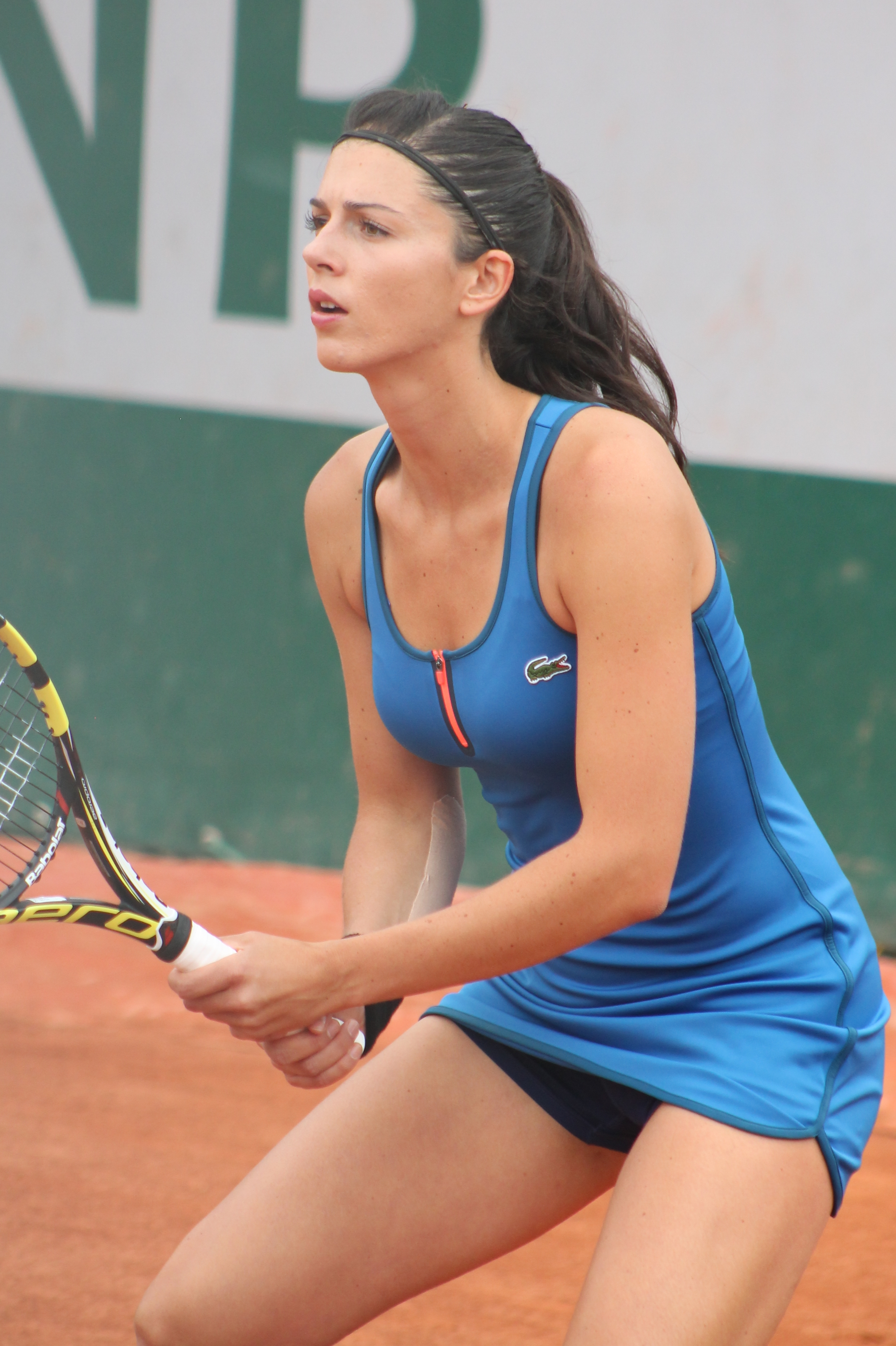
Constance Sibille, 2015

=== Doubles: 10 (1 title, 9 runner-ups) ===
Legend $100,000 tournaments $25,000 tournaments $15,000 tournaments $10,000 tournaments	Finals by surface Hard (1–4) Clay (0–5)

Result	W–L	Date	Tournament	Surface	Partner	Opponents	Score
Loss	0–1	Jul 2006	ITF Le Touquet, France	Clay	(Luxembourg) Lynn Blau	(Australia) Christina Horiatopoulos (France) Charlène Vanneste	0–6, 0–6
Loss	0–2	Sep 2007	ITF Clermont-Ferrand, France	Hard (i)	(France) Élodie Caillat	(Spain) Sabina Mediano-Álvarez (Spain) Francisca Sintès Martín	3–6, 3–6
Loss	0–3	Sep 2009	ITF Madrid, Spain	Hard	(France) Claire Feuerstein	(Russia) Nina Bratchikova (France) Irena Pavlovic	2–6, 4–6
Win	1–3	Nov 2009	ITF Équeurdreville, France	Hard (i)	(France) Elixane Lechemia	(Bulgaria) Elitsa Kostova (France) Kinnie Laisné	6–4, 6–2
Loss	1–4	Jul 2010	ITF Mont-de-Marsan, France	Clay	(Ukraine) Nadiia Kichenok	(Spain) Lara Arruabarrena (Spain) Inés Ferrer Suárez	3–6, 1–6
Loss	1–5	Jul 2010	ITF Les Contamines, France	Hard	(France) Claire Feuerstein	(Italy) Giulia Gatto-Monticone (Italy) Federica Quercia	5–7, 5–7
Loss	1–6	Jun 2011	ITF Amarante, Portugal	Hard	(Austria) Katharina Negrin	(Republic of Ireland) Amy Bowtell (United Kingdom) Yasmine Clarke	2–6, 3–6
Loss	1–7	Jun 2013	Bredeney Ladies Open, Germany	Clay	(France) Irina Ramialison	(Russia) Eugeniya Pashkova (Ukraine) Anastasiya Vasylyeva	5–7, 4–6
Loss	1–8	Jul 2015	Contrexéville Open, France	Clay	(France) Irina Ramialison	(Georgia (country)) Oksana Kalashnikova (Montenegro) Danka Kovinić	6–2, 3–6, [6–10]
Loss	1–9	Jun 2018	Maribor Open, Slovenia	Clay	(France) Irina Ramialison	(Czech Republic) Michaela Bayerlová (Kosovo) Adrijana Lekaj	6–7^{(2)}, 5–7
