= 2018 Open de Cagnes-sur-Mer – Doubles =

Doubles
- 2018 Open de Cagnes-sur-Mer

Final
- Champions: (United States) Kaitlyn Christian (United States) Sabrina Santamaria
- Runners-up: (Belarus) Vera Lapko (Kazakhstan) Galina Voskoboeva
- Score: 2–6, 7–5, [10–7]

Events
Singles	Doubles
← 2017 ·	Open de Cagnes-sur-Mer	· 2019 →

Chang Kai-chen and Hsieh Su-wei were the defending champions, but Chang chose not to participate, while Hsieh chose to compete at the 2018 Mutua Madrid Open.

Kaitlyn Christian and Sabrina Santamaria won the title, defeating Vera Lapko and Galina Voskoboeva in the final, 2–6, 7–5, [10–7].

== Seeds ==
1. (Romania) Raluca Olaru / (Netherlands) Bibiane Schoofs (semifinals)
2. (Australia) Priscilla Hon / (Slovenia) Dalila Jakupović (quarterfinals)
3. (Croatia) Darija Jurak / (Belgium) Maryna Zanevska (quarterfinals)
4. (United States) Kaitlyn Christian / (United States) Sabrina Santamaria (champions)

== Draw ==
=== Key ===
- Q = Qualifier
- WC = Wild card
- LL = Lucky loser
- Alt = Alternate
- SE = Special exempt
- PR = Protected ranking
- ITF = ITF entry
- JE = Junior exempt
- w/o = Walkover
- r = Retired
- d = Defaulted
- SR = Special ranking

=== Draw ===
First round
1	(Romania) R Olaru (Netherlands) B Schoofs	7	6
(Australia) L Cabrera (Sweden) C Lister	5	4
WC	(France) A Hesse (France) P Parmentier	6	6
WC	(France) V Rémy (France) M Témin	2	2
3	(Croatia) D Jurak (Belgium) M Zanevska	6	6
(Australia) J Moore (Australia) E Perez	4	4
(India) P Thombare (Ukraine) D Yastremska	7^{7}	0	[7]
(Belarus) V Lapko (Kazakhstan) G Voskoboeva	6^{3}	6	[10]
WC	(France) T Andrianjafitrimo (France) F Ferro	4	3
(Russia) A Blinkova (Georgia (country)) O Kalashnikova	6	6
(Russia) A Fomina (Russia) E Yashina	4	5
4	(United States) K Christian (United States) S Santamaria	6	7
(Switzerland) V Golubic (Switzerland) J Teichmann	6	6
(Argentina) M Irigoyen (Chile) D Seguel	3	1
(Sweden) R Peterson (Netherlands) A Rus	5	2
2	(Australia) P Hon (Slovenia) D Jakupović	7	6

Quarterfinals
1	(Romania) R Olaru (Netherlands) B Schoofs	6	6
WC	(France) A Hesse (France) P Parmentier	2	2
3	(Croatia) D Jurak (Belgium) M Zanevska	3	5
(Belarus) V Lapko (Kazakhstan) G Voskoboeva	6	7
(Russia) A Blinkova (Georgia (country)) O Kalashnikova	3	1
4	(United States) K Christian (United States) S Santamaria	6	6
(Switzerland) V Golubic (Switzerland) J Teichmann	6	6
2	(Australia) P Hon (Slovenia) D Jakupović	3	3

Semifinals
1	(Romania) R Olaru (Netherlands) B Schoofs	1	6	[3]
(Belarus) V Lapko (Kazakhstan) G Voskoboeva	6	3	[10]
4	(United States) K Christian (United States) S Santamaria	7	6
(Switzerland) V Golubic (Switzerland) J Teichmann	5	3

Final
(Belarus) V Lapko (Kazakhstan) G Voskoboeva	6	5	[7]
4	(United States) K Christian (United States) S Santamaria	2	7	[10]
