= 2019 Open de Cagnes-sur-Mer =

- Date: 6–12 May 2019
- Edition: 22nd
- Category: ITF Women's World Tennis Tour
- Prize money: $80,000
- Surface: Clay
- Location: Cagnes-sur-Mer, France

Champions

Singles
- (United States) Christina McHale

Doubles
- (Russia) Anna Blinkova / (Switzerland) Xenia Knoll
← 2018 ·	Open de Cagnes-sur-Mer	· 2020 →

The 2019 Open de Cagnes-sur-Mer Alpes-Maritimes was a professional tennis tournament played on outdoor clay courts. It was the twenty-second edition of the tournament which was part of the 2019 ITF Women's World Tennis Tour. It took place in Cagnes-sur-Mer, France between 6 and 12 May 2019.

== Singles main-draw entrants ==
=== Seeds ===
Country	Player	Rank^{1}	Seed
RUS	Vitalia Diatchenko	73	1
USA	Bernarda Pera	105	2
SUI	Stefanie Vögele	107	3
SUI	Timea Bacsinszky	111	4
JPN	Nao Hibino	112	5
RUS	Anna Blinkova	121	6
BRA	Beatriz Haddad Maia	123	7
ISR	Julia Glushko	125	8

- ^{1} Rankings are as of 29 April 2019.

=== Other entrants ===
The following players received wildcards into the singles main draw:

- (France) Julie Gervais
- (France) Diane Parry
- (United States) Gabriella Price
- (France) Harmony Tan

The following player received entry as a special exempt:

- (Ukraine) Katarina Zavatska

The following players received entry from the qualifying draw:

- (Brazil) Carolina Alves
- (Italy) Martina Di Giuseppe
- (Russia) Varvara Gracheva
- (Switzerland) Ylena In-Albon
- (France) Alizé Lim
- (France) Irina Ramialison
- (France) Marie Témin
- (France) Margot Yerolymos

The following player received entry as a lucky loser:

- (Russia) Anna Kalinskaya

== Champions ==
=== Singles ===
- (United States) Christina McHale def. (Switzerland) Stefanie Vögele, 7–6^{(7–4)}, 6–2

=== Doubles ===
- (Russia) Anna Blinkova / (Switzerland) Xenia Knoll def. (Brazil) Beatriz Haddad Maia / (Brazil) Luisa Stefani, 4–6, 6–2, [14–12]
