= 2018 Open de Cagnes-sur-Mer =

- Date: 7–13 May
- Edition: 21st
- Category: ITF Women's Circuit
- Prize money: $100,000
- Surface: Clay
- Location: Cagnes-sur-Mer, France

Champions

Singles
- (Sweden) Rebecca Peterson

Doubles
- (United States) Kaitlyn Christian / (United States) Sabrina Santamaria
← 2017 ·	Open de Cagnes-sur-Mer	· 2019 →

The 2018 Open de Cagnes-sur-Mer was a professional tennis tournament played on outdoor clay courts. It was the twenty-first edition of the tournament and was part of the 2018 ITF Women's Circuit. It took place in Cagnes-sur-Mer, France, on 7–13 May 2018.

== Singles main draw entrants ==
=== Seeds ===
Country	Player	Rank^{1}	Seed
GER	Carina Witthöft	56	1
FRA	Pauline Parmentier	76	2
FRA	Océane Dodin	105	3
GER	Andrea Petkovic	106	4
SVK	Viktória Kužmová	108	5
NED	Arantxa Rus	109	6
CRO	Jana Fett	112	7
SWE	Rebecca Peterson	113	8

- ^{1} Rankings as of 30 April 2018.

=== Other entrants ===
The following players received a wildcard into the singles main draw:

- (Canada) Eugenie Bouchard
- (France) Fiona Ferro
- (France) Amandine Hesse
- (Germany) Andrea Petkovic

The following players received entry from the qualifying draw:

- (Romania) Alexandra Dulgheru
- (Netherlands) Bibiane Schoofs
- (Chile) Daniela Seguel
- (Ukraine) Dayana Yastremska

The following players received entry as lucky losers:

- (Australia) Jaimee Fourlis
- (Australia) Priscilla Hon

== Champions ==
=== Singles ===
- (Sweden) Rebecca Peterson def. (Ukraine) Dayana Yastremska, 6–4, 7–5

=== Doubles ===
- (United States) Kaitlyn Christian / (United States) Sabrina Santamaria def. (Belarus) Vera Lapko / (Kazakhstan) Galina Voskoboeva, 2–6, 7–5, [10–7]
