= 2014 Open GDF Suez de Cagnes-sur-Mer Alpes-Maritimes – Doubles =

Doubles
- 2014 Open GDF Suez de Cagnes-sur-Mer Alpes-Maritimes

Final
- Champions: (Netherlands) Kiki Bertens (Sweden) Johanna Larsson
- Runners-up: (Argentina) Tatiana Búa (Chile) Daniela Seguel
- Score: 7–6^{(7–4)}, 6–4

Events
Singles	Doubles
← 2013 ·	Open GDF Suez de Cagnes-sur-Mer Alpes-Maritimes	· 2015 →

Vania King and Arantxa Rus were the defending champions, having won the event in 2013, but both players chose not to participate.

Kiki Bertens and Johanna Larsson won the tournament, defeating Tatiana Búa and Daniela Seguel in the final, 7–6^{(7–4)}, 6–4.

== Seeds ==
1. (Austria) Sandra Klemenschits / (Slovenia) Andreja Klepač (first round)
2. (Ukraine) ~~Irina Buryachok /~~ (Ukraine) ~~Nadiya Kichenok~~ (withdrew)
3. (Czech Republic) Eva Hrdinová / (Russia) Valeria Solovyeva (semifinals)
4. (Canada) Sharon Fichman / (United Kingdom) Heather Watson (semifinals)

== Draw ==
=== Key ===
- Q = Qualifier
- WC = Wild card
- LL = Lucky loser
- Alt = Alternate
- SE = Special exempt
- PR = Protected ranking
- ITF = ITF entry
- JE = Junior exempt
- w/o = Walkover
- r = Retired
- d = Defaulted
- SR = Special ranking

First round
1	(Austria) S Klemenschits (Slovenia) A Klepač	3	5
(Argentina) T Búa (Chile) D Seguel	6	7
(France) M Johansson (France) P Parmentier	6	6
WC	(France) M Arcangioli (France) I Ramialison	0	2
4	(Canada) S Fichman (United Kingdom) H Watson	6	6
(Romania) L-I Andrei (Ukraine) A Fomina	4	3
(Chile) C Costa Melgar (Georgia (country)) E Gorgodze	6	6
(Austria) T Paszek (Belgium) Y Wickmayer	4	2
WC	(France) C Feuerstein (France) A Lim	3	3
(Luxembourg) M Minella (Russia) A Panova	6	6
(Argentina) M Irigoyen (Poland) M Linette	5	6^{4}
3	(Czech Republic) E Hrdinová (Russia) V Solovyeva	7	7^{7}
(Netherlands) K Bertens (Sweden) J Larsson	5	6	[10]
(Italy) N Clerico (Italy) G Gatto-Monticone	7	2	[4]
WC	(Italy) G Sanesi (United Kingdom) N Slater	5	1
Alt	(Uzbekistan) N Abduraimova (Italy) ME Camerin	7	6

Quarterfinals
(Argentina) T Búa (Chile) D Seguel	4	7^{7}	[10]
(France) M Johansson (France) P Parmentier	6	6^{4}	[2]
4	(Canada) S Fichman (United Kingdom) H Watson	7^{7}	6
(Chile) C Costa Melgar (Georgia (country)) E Gorgodze	6^{3}	4
(Luxembourg) M Minella (Russia) A Panova	3	2
3	(Czech Republic) E Hrdinová (Russia) V Solovyeva	6	6
(Netherlands) K Bertens (Sweden) J Larsson	6	6
Alt	(Uzbekistan) N Abduraimova (Italy) ME Camerin	1	2

Semifinals
(Argentina) T Búa (Chile) D Seguel	6	4	[10]
4	(Canada) S Fichman (United Kingdom) H Watson	2	6	[8]
3	(Czech Republic) E Hrdinová (Russia) V Solovyeva	4	2
(Netherlands) K Bertens (Sweden) J Larsson	6	6

Final
(Argentina) T Búa (Chile) D Seguel	6^{4}	4
(Netherlands) K Bertens (Sweden) J Larsson	7^{7}	6
