= 2012 Open GDF Suez de Cagnes-sur-Mer Alpes-Maritimes =

- Date: 7–13 May
- Edition: 15th
- Surface: Clay
- Location: Cagnes-sur-Mer, France

Champions

Singles
- (Russia) Yulia Putintseva

Doubles
- (Russia) Alexandra Panova / (Poland) Urszula Radwańska
← 2011 ·	Open GDF Suez de Cagnes-sur-Mer Alpes-Maritimes	· 2013 →

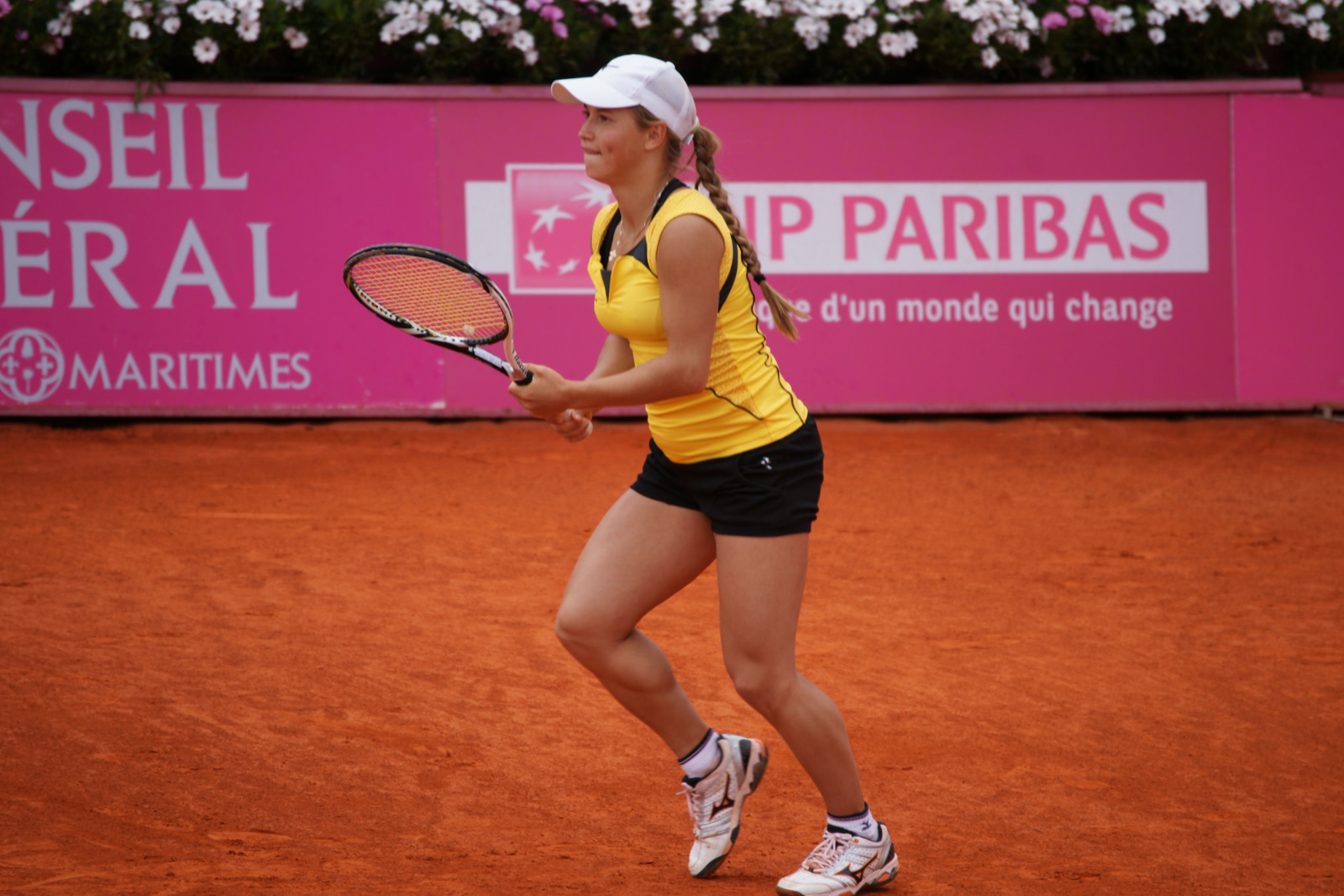
Yulia Putintseva

The 2012 Open GDF Suez de Cagnes-sur-Mer Alpes-Maritimes was a professional tennis tournament played on clay courts. It was the fifteenth edition of the tournament which was part of the 2012 ITF Women's Circuit. It took place in Cagnes-sur-Mer, France between 7 and 13 May 2012.

== WTA entrants ==
=== Seeds ===
Country	Player	Rank^{1}	Seed
GBR	Elena Baltacha	63	1
HUN	Tímea Babos	64	2
ROU	Alexandra Cadanțu	74	3
GBR	Anne Keothavong	75	4
RUS	Alexandra Panova	76	5
JPN	Ayumi Morita	77	6
JPN	Kimiko Date-Krumm	79	7
FRA	Stéphanie Foretz Gacon	82	8

- ^{1} Rankings are as of April 30, 2012.

=== Other entrants ===
The following players received wildcards into the singles main draw:

- (France) Caroline Garcia
- (France) Victoria Larrière
- (France) Kristina Mladenovic
- (France) Aravane Rezaï

The following players received entry from the qualifying draw:

- (Serbia) Vesna Dolonts
- (Russia) Yulia Putintseva
- (Slovenia) Petra Rampre
- (United Kingdom) Laura Robson

The following players received entry by a Junior Exempt:

- (Russia) Irina Khromacheva

== Champions ==
=== Singles ===
- (Russia) Yulia Putintseva def. (Austria) Patricia Mayr-Achleitner, 6–2, 6–1

=== Doubles ===
- (Russia) Alexandra Panova / (Poland) Urszula Radwańska def. (Hungary) Katalin Marosi / (Czech Republic) Renata Voráčová, 7–5, 4–6, [10–6]
