= 2017 Open de Cagnes-sur-Mer Alpes-Maritimes =

- Date: 8–14 May
- Edition: 20th
- Category: ITF Women's Circuit
- Prize money: $100,000
- Surface: Clay
- Location: Cagnes-sur-Mer, France

Champions

Singles
- (Brazil) Beatriz Haddad Maia

Doubles
- (Chinese Taipei) Chang Kai-chen / (Chinese Taipei) Hsieh Su-wei
← 2016 ·	Open de Cagnes-sur-Mer Alpes-Maritimes	· 2018 →

The 2017 Open de Cagnes-sur-Mer Alpes-Maritimes was a professional tennis tournament played on outdoor clay courts. It was the twentieth edition of the tournament and part of the 2017 ITF Women's Circuit, offering a total of $100,000 in prize money. It took place in Cagnes-sur-Mer, France, from 8–14 May 2017.

== Point distribution ==
Event	W	F	SF	QF	Round of 16	Round of 32	Q	Q2	Q3
Singles	140	85	50	25	13	1	6	4	1
Doubles	140	85	50	25	1	—	—	—	—

== Singles main draw entrants ==
=== Seeds ===
Country	Player	Rank^{1}	Seed
GER	Carina Witthöft	71	1
BEL	Yanina Wickmayer	74	2
RUS	Irina Khromacheva	90	3
GER	Tatjana Maria	104	4
MNE	Danka Kovinić	106	5
TPE	Hsieh Su-wei	107	6
GBR	Heather Watson	110	7
TPE	Chang Kai-chen	112	8

- ^{1} Rankings as of 1 May 2017

=== Other entrants ===
The following players received wildcards into the singles main draw:

- (France) Tessah Andrianjafitrimo
- (France) Fiona Ferro
- (France) Amandine Hesse
- (France) Chloé Paquet

The following players received entry into the singles main draw by a protected ranking:

- (Romania) Alexandra Dulgheru

The following players received entry from the qualifying draw:

- (Croatia) Jana Fett
- (Russia) Elizaveta Kulichkova
- (France) Alizé Lim
- (Ukraine) Katarina Zavatska

== Champions ==
=== Singles ===
- (Brazil) Beatriz Haddad Maia def. (Switzerland) Jil Teichmann, 6–3, 6–3

=== Doubles ===
- (Chinese Taipei) Chang Kai-chen / (Chinese Taipei) Hsieh Su-wei def. (Romania) Raluca Olaru / (Czech Republic) Renata Voráčová, 7–5, 6–1
