= 2011 Open GDF Suez de Cagnes-sur-Mer Alpes-Maritimes =

- Date: 2–8 May
- Edition: 14th
- Location: Cagnes-sur-Mer, France

Champions

Singles
- (Romania) Sorana Cîrstea

Doubles
- (Germany) Anna-Lena Grönefeld / (Croatia) Petra Martić
← 2010 ·	Open GDF Suez de Cagnes-sur-Mer Alpes-Maritimes	· 2012 →

The 2011 Open GDF Suez de Cagnes-sur-Mer Alpes-Maritimes was a professional tennis tournament played on clay courts. It was part of the 2011 ITF Women's Circuit. It took place in Cagnes-sur-Mer, France between 2 and 9 May 2011.

== Singles entrants ==
=== Seeds ===
Country	Player	Rank^{1}	Seed
GER	Kristina Barrois	71	1
FRA	Mathilde Johansson	74	2
CHN	Zhang Shuai	78	3
RUS	Ksenia Pervak	84	4
BEL	Kirsten Flipkens	86	5
GBR	Elena Baltacha	90	6
CZE	Renata Voráčová	95	7
GBR	Anne Keothavong	96	8

- Rankings are as of April 25, 2010.

=== Other entrants ===
The following players received wildcards into the singles main draw:

- (France) Stéphanie Foretz Gacon
- (France) Caroline Garcia
- (France) Kristina Mladenovic
- (France) Olivia Sanchez

The following players received entry from the qualifying draw:

- (Spain) Lara Arruabarrena-Vecino
- (Germany) Mona Barthel
- (Slovenia) Andreja Klepač
- (Russia) Valeria Savinykh

== Champions ==
=== Singles ===
(Romania) Sorana Cîrstea def. (France) Pauline Parmentier, 6–7(5), 6–2, 6–2

=== Doubles ===
(Germany) Anna-Lena Grönefeld / (Croatia) Petra Martić def. (Croatia) Darija Jurak / (Czech Republic) Renata Voráčová, 1–6, 6–2, [11–9]
