= 2014 Open GDF Suez de Cagnes-sur-Mer Alpes-Maritimes =

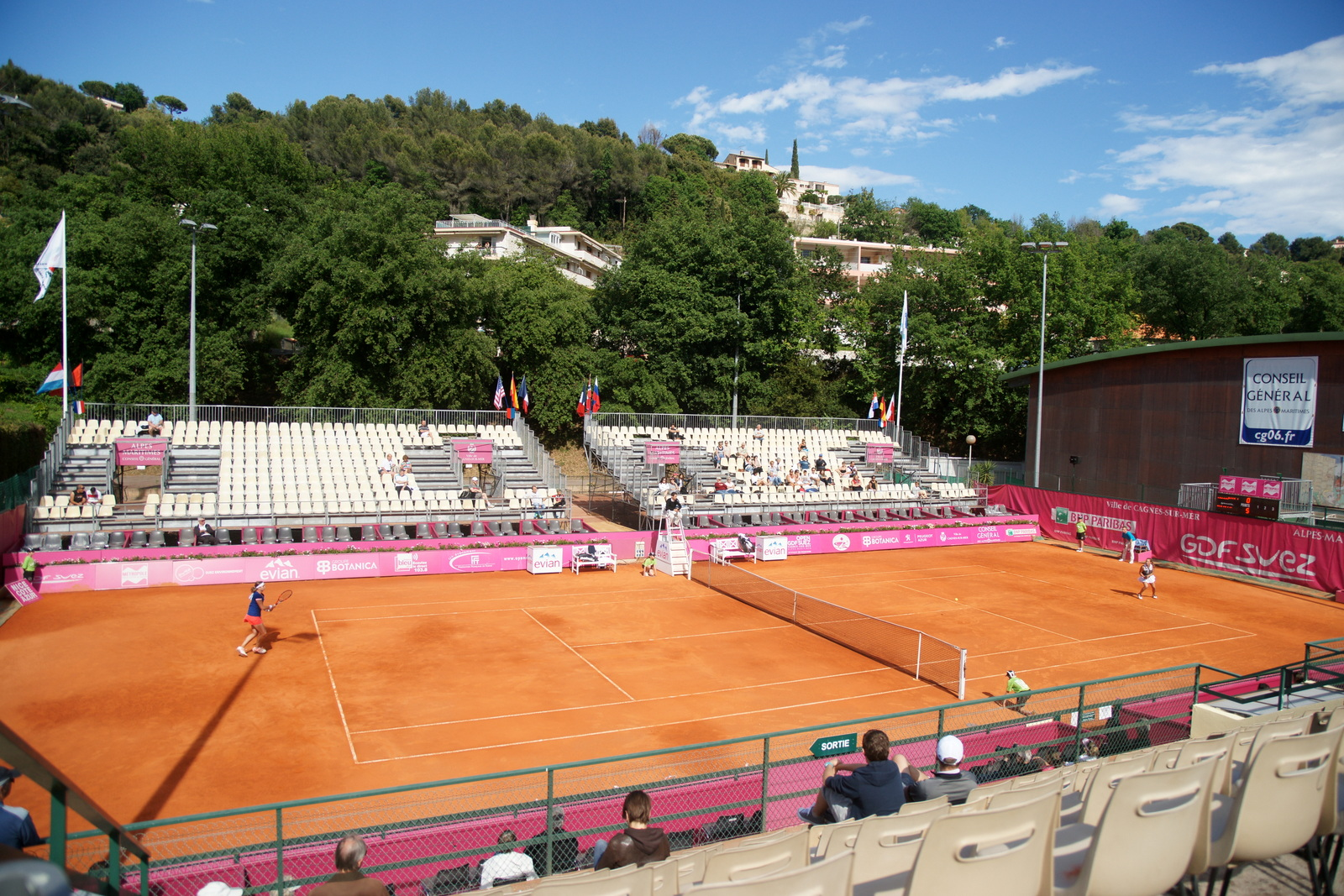
- Date: 5–11 May
- Edition: 17th
- Category: ITF Women's Circuit
- Prize money: $100,000
- Surface: Clay
- Location: Cagnes-sur-Mer, France

Champions

Singles
- (Canada) Sharon Fichman

Doubles
- (Netherlands) Kiki Bertens / (Sweden) Johanna Larsson
← 2013 ·	Open GDF Suez de Cagnes-sur-Mer Alpes-Maritimes	· 2015 →

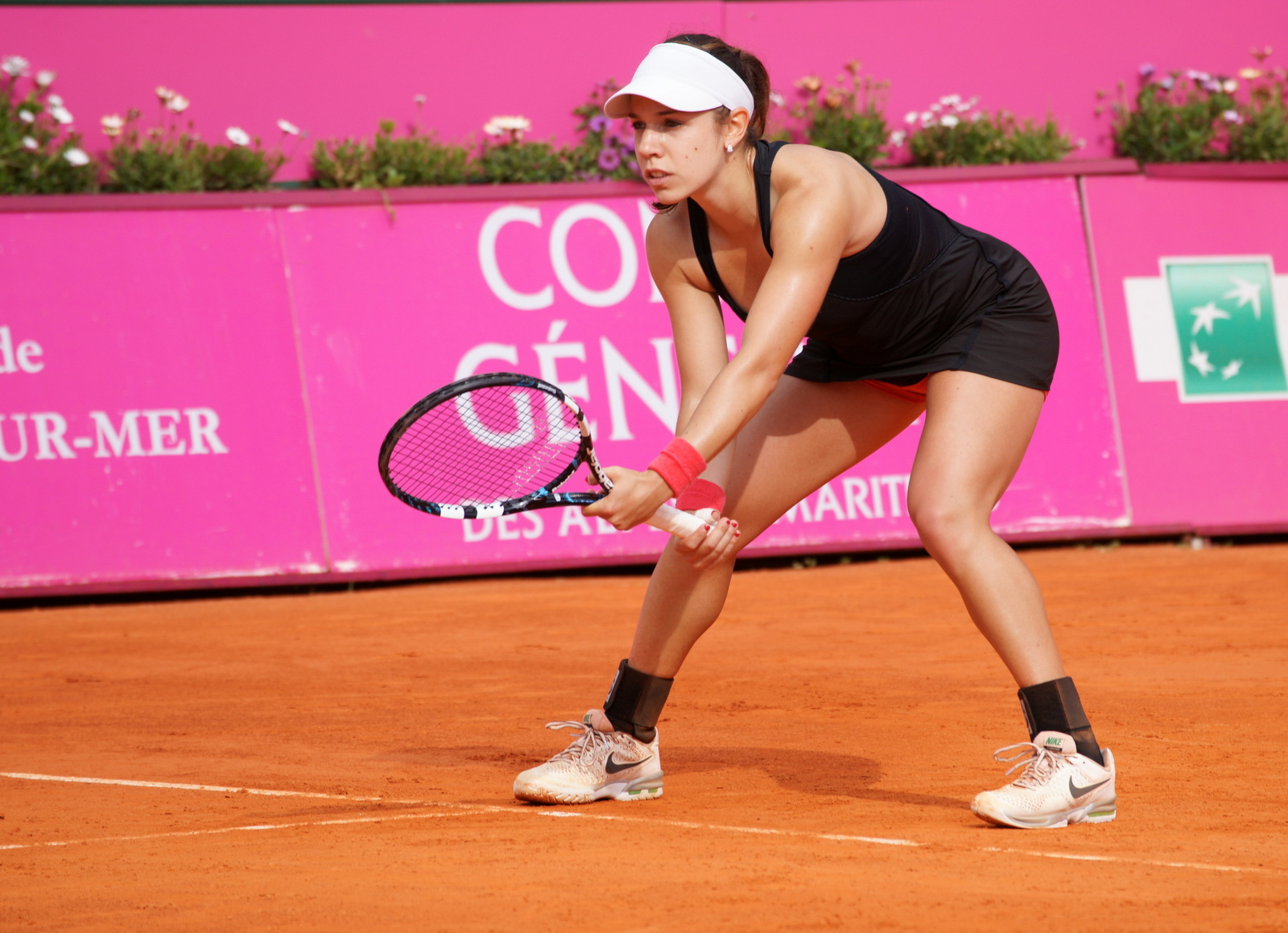
2014 singles champion Sharon Fichman

The 2014 Open GDF Suez de Cagnes-sur-Mer Alpes-Maritimes was a professional tennis tournament played on outdoor clay courts. It was the seventeenth edition of the tournament and part of the 2014 ITF Women's Circuit, offering a total of $100,000 in prize money. It took place in Cagnes-sur-Mer, France, on 5–11 May 2014.

== Singles main draw entrants ==
=== Seeds ===
Country	Player	Rank^{1}	Seed
BEL	Yanina Wickmayer	58	1
SUI	Romina Oprandi	78	2
KAZ	Zarina Diyas	89	3
SWE	Johanna Larsson	91	4
CAN	Sharon Fichman	92	5
ESP	Estrella Cabeza Candela	103	6
POL	Magda Linette	106	7
~~UKR~~	~~Nadiya Kichenok~~	~~107~~	~~8~~

- ^{1} Rankings as of 28 April 2014

=== Other entrants ===
The following players received wildcards into the singles main draw:

- (France) Fiona Ferro
- (France) Myrtille Georges
- (France) Pauline Parmentier
- (Austria) Tamira Paszek

The following players received entry from the qualifying draw:

- (Australia) Ashleigh Barty
- (Netherlands) Richèl Hogenkamp
- (Chile) Daniela Seguel
- (United States) Sachia Vickery

The following players received entry by a lucky loser spot:

- (Italy) Giulia Gatto-Monticone
- (France) Irina Ramialison

=== Withdrawals ===
Before the tournament

- (Ukraine) Nadiya Kichenok

== Champions ==
=== Singles ===
- (Canada) Sharon Fichman def. (Switzerland) Timea Bacsinszky 6–2, 6–2

=== Doubles ===
- (Netherlands) Kiki Bertens / (Sweden) Johanna Larsson def. (Argentina) Tatiana Búa / (Chile) Daniela Seguel 7–6^{(7–4)}, 6–4
