= 2020 Open de Cagnes-sur-Mer – Doubles =

Professional tennis tournament

Doubles
- 2020 Open de Cagnes-sur-Mer

Final
- Champions: (United Kingdom) Samantha Murray Sharan (Germany) Julia Wachaczyk
- Runners-up: (Poland) Paula Kania (Poland) Katarzyna Piter
- Score: 7–5, 6–2

Events
Singles	Doubles
← 2019 ·	Open de Cagnes-sur-Mer	· 2021 →

Anna Blinkova and Xenia Knoll were the defending champions but chose not to participate.

Samantha Murray Sharan and Julia Wachaczyk won the title, defeating Paula Kania and Katarzyna Piter in the final, 7–5, 6–2.

== Seeds ==
1. (Spain) Sara Sorribes Tormo / (Serbia) Nina Stojanović (semifinals)
2. (Belgium) Greet Minnen / (Belgium) Alison Van Uytvanck (semifinals, retired)
3. (India) Ankita Raina / (Netherlands) Rosalie van der Hoek (first round)
4. (United States) Ingrid Neel / (New Zealand) Erin Routliffe (first round)

== Draw ==
=== Key ===
- Q = Qualifier
- WC = Wild card
- LL = Lucky loser
- Alt = Alternate
- SE = Special exempt
- PR = Protected ranking
- ITF = ITF entry
- JE = Junior exempt
- w/o = Walkover
- r = Retired
- d = Defaulted
- SR = Special ranking

=== Draw ===
First round
1	(Spain) S Sorribes Tormo (Serbia) N Stojanović	6	6
WC	(Romania) N Dascălu (Ukraine) M Kostiuk	3	3
(United Kingdom) SB Grey (United Kingdom) E Silva	3	5
(United States) C McNally (United States) W Osuigwe	6	7
4	(United States) I Neel (New Zealand) E Routliffe	2	2
(Switzerland) V Golubic (Ukraine) K Zavatska	6	6
(Germany) T Morderger (Germany) Y Morderger	1	0
(Poland) P Kania (Poland) K Piter	6	6
(Romania) I Bara (United States) V Lepchenko	4	5
WC	(France) A Droguet (France) S Janicijevic	6	7
(United Kingdom) S Murray Sharan (Germany) J Wachaczyk	7	2	[10]
3	(India) A Raina (Netherlands) R van der Hoek	5	6	[8]
(France) C Burel (France) C Paquet	6	1	[10]
WC	(France) S Cakarevic (France) M Yerolymos	4	6	[2]
(Georgia (country)) M Bolkvadze (Australia) S Mendez	3	6^{1}
2	(Belgium) G Minnen (Belgium) A Van Uytvanck	6	7^{7}

Quarterfinals
1	(Spain) S Sorribes Tormo (Serbia) N Stojanović	6	7^{7}
(United States) C McNally (United States) W Osuigwe	0	6^{5}
(Switzerland) V Golubic (Ukraine) K Zavatska	4	6	[8]
(Poland) P Kania (Poland) K Piter	6	3	[10]
WC	(France) A Droguet (France) S Janicijevic	4	4
(United Kingdom) S Murray Sharan (Germany) J Wachaczyk	6	6
(France) C Burel (France) C Paquet	3	3
2	(Belgium) G Minnen (Belgium) A Van Uytvanck	6	6

Semifinals
1	(Spain) S Sorribes Tormo (Serbia) N Stojanović	6^{3}	4
(Poland) P Kania (Poland) K Piter	7^{7}	6
(United Kingdom) S Murray Sharan (Germany) J Wachaczyk	4
2	(Belgium) G Minnen (Belgium) A Van Uytvanck	1^{r}

Final
(Poland) P Kania (Poland) K Piter	5	2
(United Kingdom) S Murray Sharan (Germany) J Wachaczyk	7	6
