= 2013 Open GDF Suez de Cagnes-sur-Mer Alpes-Maritimes – Doubles =

Doubles
- 2013 Open GDF Suez de Cagnes-sur-Mer Alpes-Maritimes

Final
- Champions: (United States) Vania King (Netherlands) Arantxa Rus
- Runners-up: (Colombia) Catalina Castaño (Brazil) Teliana Pereira
- Score: 4–6, 7–5, [10–8]

Events
Singles	Doubles
← 2012 ·	Open GDF Suez de Cagnes-sur-Mer Alpes-Maritimes	· 2014 →

Alexandra Panova and Urszula Radwańska were the defending champions, having won the event in 2012, but Radwańska chose not to defend her title. Panova paired up with Valeria Solovyeva but lost in the quarterfinals.

Vania King and Arantxa Rus won the title, defeating Catalina Castaño and Teliana Pereira in the final, 4–6, 7–5, [10–8].

== Seeds ==
1. (Russia) Alexandra Panova / (Russia) Valeria Solovyeva (quarterfinals)
2. (United States) Julia Cohen / (Germany) Tatjana Maria (semifinals)
3. (Chinese Taipei) Chang Kai-chen / (France) Caroline Garcia (first round)
4. (Austria) Sandra Klemenschits / (Slovenia) Andreja Klepač (first round)

== Draw ==
=== Key ===
- Q = Qualifier
- WC = Wild card
- LL = Lucky loser
- Alt = Alternate
- SE = Special exempt
- PR = Protected ranking
- ITF = ITF entry
- JE = Junior exempt
- w/o = Walkover
- r = Retired
- d = Defaulted
- SR = Special ranking

First round
1/WC	(Russia) A Panova (Russia) V Solovyeva	6	7^{7}
(Ukraine) O Savchuk (Ukraine) E Svitolina	2	6^{3}
(France) J Coin (Canada) S Fichman	6	6
(Argentina) T Búa (Chile) D Seguel	3	1
3	(Chinese Taipei) K-c Chang (France) C Garcia	4	3
(Colombia) C Castaño (Brazil) T Pereira	6	6
(France) M Georges (France) C Seateun
(France) C Feuerstein (France) V Larrière	^{w/o}
(Russia) N Bratchikova (Romania) A Cadanțu	4	6	[10]
(Russia) Y Kalabina (Russia) P Leykina	6	4	[7]
(United States) V King (Netherlands) A Rus	6	6
4	(Austria) S Klemenschits (Slovenia) A Klepač	0	2
(France) A Hesse (France) I Ramialison	5	4
(Russia) M Melnikova (Georgia (country)) S Shapatava	7	6
(France) S Beltrame (France) L Thorpe	1	4
2	(United States) J Cohen (Germany) T Maria	6	6

Quarterfinals
1/WC	(Russia) A Panova (Russia) V Solovyeva	3	6	[8]
(France) J Coin (Canada) S Fichman	6	1	[10]
(Colombia) C Castaño (Brazil) T Pereira	6	5	[10]
(France) C Feuerstein (France) V Larrière	2	7	[3]
(Russia) N Bratchikova (Romania) A Cadanțu	2	6	[2]
(United States) V King (Netherlands) A Rus	6	3	[10]
(Russia) M Melnikova (Georgia (country)) S Shapatava	1	6	[7]
2	(United States) J Cohen (Germany) T Maria	6	4	[10]

Semifinals
(France) J Coin (Canada) S Fichman	4	5
(Colombia) C Castaño (Brazil) T Pereira	6	7
(United States) V King (Netherlands) A Rus	6	6
2	(United States) J Cohen (Germany) T Maria	4	1

Final
(Colombia) C Castaño (Brazil) T Pereira	6	5	[8]
(United States) V King (Netherlands) A Rus	4	7	[10]
