= 2013 Open GDF Suez de Cagnes-sur-Mer Alpes-Maritimes =

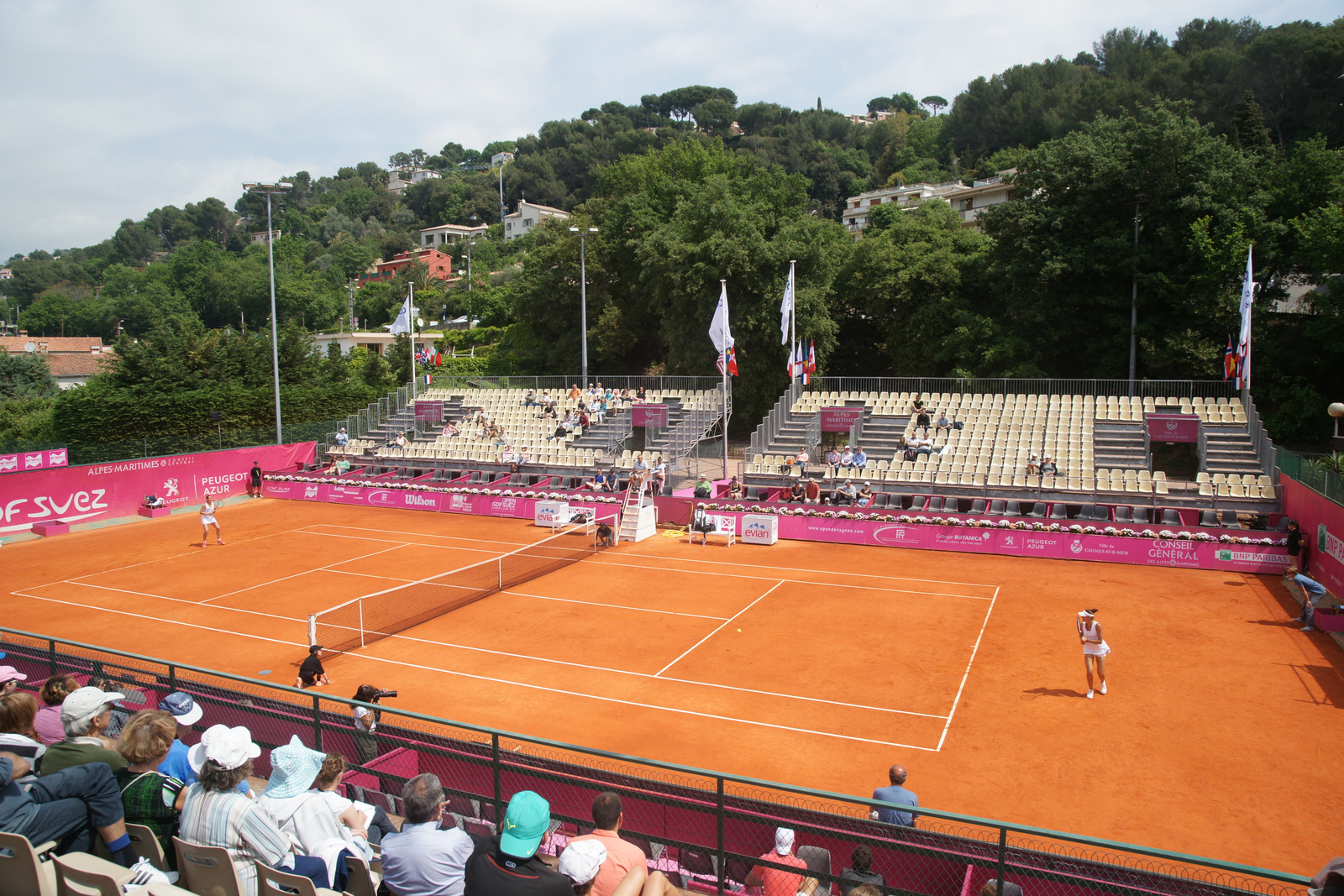
- Date: 6–12 May
- Edition: 16th
- Location: Cagnes-sur-Mer, France

Champions

Singles
- (France) Caroline Garcia

Doubles
- (United States) Vania King / (Netherlands) Arantxa Rus
← 2012 ·	Open GDF Suez de Cagnes-sur-Mer Alpes-Maritimes	· 2014 →

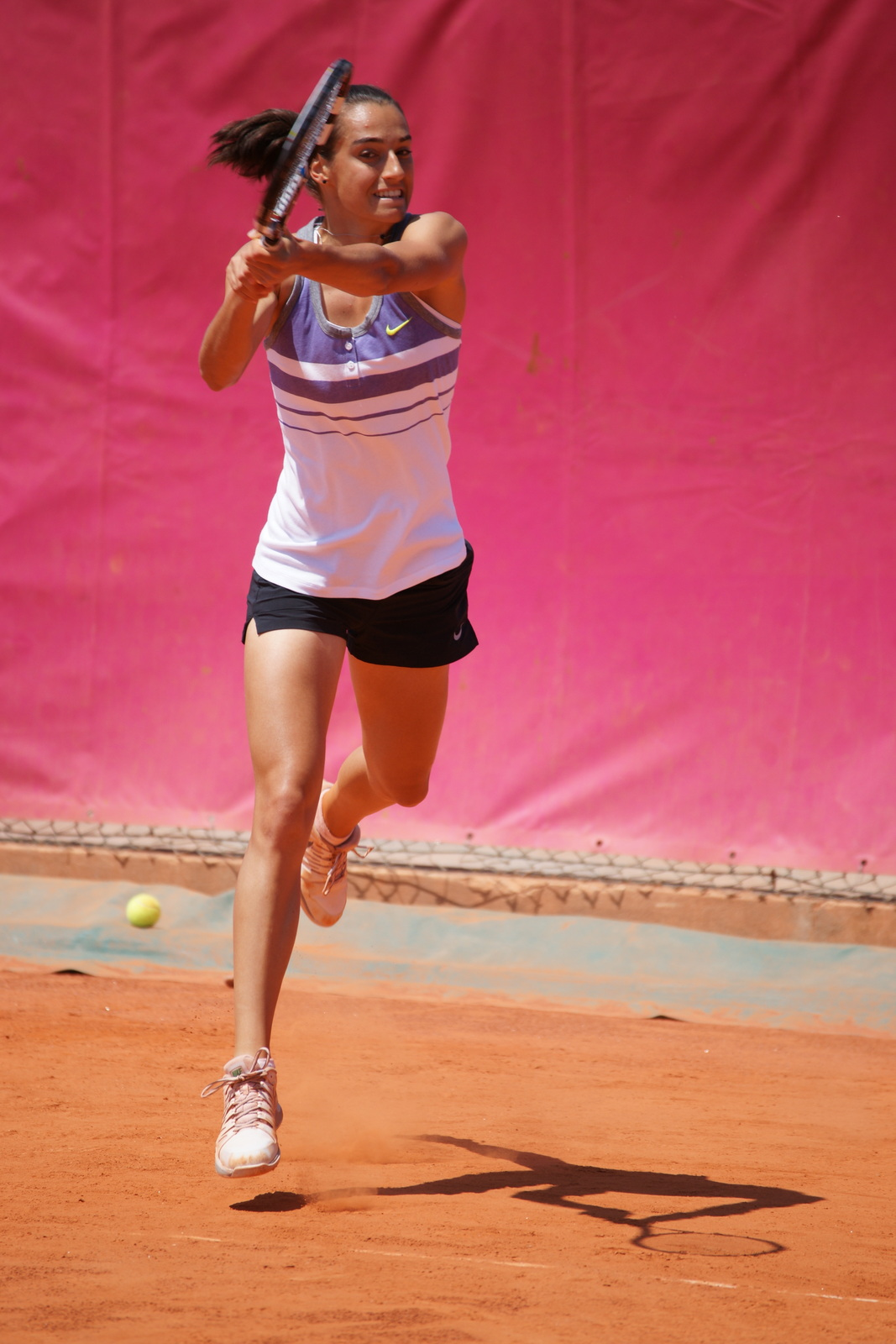
Caroline Garcia

The 2013 Open GDF Suez de Cagnes-sur-Mer Alpes-Maritimes was a professional tennis tournament played on outdoor clay courts. It was the sixteenth edition of the tournament which was part of the 2013 ITF Women's Circuit, offering a total of $100,000 in prize money. It took place in Cagnes-sur-Mer, France, on 6–12 May 2013.

== WTA entrants ==
=== Seeds ===
Country	Player	Rank^{1}	Seed
SUI	Romina Oprandi	53	1
LUX	Mandy Minella	79	2
FRA	Pauline Parmentier	82	3
NED	Arantxa Rus	87	4
JPN	Misaki Doi	89	5
UKR	Elina Svitolina	91	6
ROU	Alexandra Cadanțu	98	7
CRO	Petra Martić	101	8

- ^{1} Rankings as of 29 April 2013

=== Other entrants ===
The following players received wildcards into the singles main draw:

- (France) Caroline Garcia
- (France) Myrtille Georges
- (Kazakhstan) Sesil Karatantcheva
- (France) Virginie Razzano

The following players received entry from the qualifying draw:

- (Russia) Vera Dushevina
- (France) Irina Ramialison
- (Germany) Anne Schäfer
- (Chile) Daniela Seguel

The following player received entry into the singles main draw as a lucky loser:

- (Ukraine) Maryna Zanevska

== Champions ==
=== Singles ===
- (France) Caroline Garcia def. (Ukraine) Maryna Zanevska 6–0, 4–6, 6–3

=== Doubles ===
- (United States) Vania King / (Netherlands) Arantxa Rus def. (Colombia) Catalina Castaño / (Brazil) Teliana Pereira 4–6, 7–5, [10–8]
