= 2012 Open GDF Suez de Cagnes-sur-Mer Alpes-Maritimes – Doubles =

Doubles
- 2012 Open GDF Suez de Cagnes-sur-Mer Alpes-Maritimes

Final
- Champions: (Russia) Alexandra Panova (Poland) Urszula Radwańska
- Runners-up: (Hungary) Katalin Marosi (Czech Republic) Renata Voráčová
- Score: 7–5, 4–6, [10–6]

Events
Singles	Doubles
← 2011 ·	Open GDF Suez de Cagnes-sur-Mer Alpes-Maritimes	· 2013 →

Anna-Lena Grönefeld and Petra Martić were the defending champions, but both chose not to participate.

Alexandra Panova and Urszula Radwańska won the title defeating Katalin Marosi and Renata Voráčová in the final 7–5, 4–6, [10–6].

== Seeds ==
1. (Uzbekistan) Akgul Amanmuradova / (Chinese Taipei) Chuang Chia-jung (quarterfinals)
2. (Russia) Alexandra Panova / (Poland) Urszula Radwańska (champions)
3. (Russia) Nina Bratchikova / (Croatia) Darija Jurak (semifinals)
4. (Hungary) Tímea Babos / (France) Kristina Mladenovic (first round)

== Draw ==
=== Key ===
- Q = Qualifier
- WC = Wild card
- LL = Lucky loser
- Alt = Alternate
- SE = Special exempt
- PR = Protected ranking
- ITF = ITF entry
- JE = Junior exempt
- w/o = Walkover
- r = Retired
- d = Defaulted
- SR = Special ranking

=== Draw ===
First round
1	(Uzbekistan) A Amanmuradova (Chinese Taipei) C-j Chuang	6	7
(United Kingdom) A Keothavong (Russia) V Savinykh	4	5
(Latvia) L Dekmeijere (Russia) M Kondratieva	6	4	[8]
(Bosnia and Herzegovina) M Jugić-Salkić (Austria) S Klemenschits	4	6	[10]
4	(Hungary) T Babos (France) K Mladenovic	1	1
(Hungary) K Marosi (Czech Republic) R Voráčová	6	6
(United States) L Lee-Waters (United States) M Moulton-Levy	7^{14}	6
(Luxembourg) M Minella (France) I Pavlovic	6^{12}	0
(Czech Republic) Ka Plíšková (Czech Republic) Kr Plíšková	3	0^{r}
WC	(France) C Feuerstein (France) V Larrière	6	1
(Romania) A Cadanțu (Australia) D Jelfea	5	7	[7]
3	(Russia) N Bratchikova (Croatia) D Jurak	7	5	[10]
WC	(France) S Beltrame (France) L Thorpe	4	7^{7}	[10]
WC	(France) C de Gubernatis (France) A Ferrand	6	6^{4}	[5]
(Romania) M Buzărnescu (Serbia) T Mirčić	4	2
2	(Russia) A Panova (Poland) U Radwańska	6	6

Quarterfinals
1	(Uzbekistan) A Amanmuradova (Chinese Taipei) C-j Chuang	1	2
(Bosnia and Herzegovina) M Jugić-Salkić (Austria) S Klemenschits	6	6
(Hungary) K Marosi (Czech Republic) R Voráčová	6^{3}	6	[10]
(United States) L Lee-Waters (United States) M Moulton-Levy	7^{7}	2	[7]
WC	(France) C Feuerstein (France) V Larrière	4	1
3	(Russia) N Bratchikova (Croatia) D Jurak	6	6
WC	(France) S Beltrame (France) L Thorpe	3	4
2	(Russia) A Panova (Poland) U Radwańska	6	6

Semifinals
(Bosnia and Herzegovina) M Jugić-Salkić (Austria) S Klemenschits	5	6	[5]
(Hungary) K Marosi (Czech Republic) R Voráčová	7	4	[10]
3	(Russia) N Bratchikova (Croatia) D Jurak	3	2
2	(Russia) A Panova (Poland) U Radwańska	6	6

Finals
(Hungary) K Marosi (Czech Republic) R Voráčová	5	6	[6]
2	(Russia) A Panova (Poland) U Radwańska	7	4	[10]
