= 2014 Open GDF Suez de Cagnes-sur-Mer Alpes-Maritimes – Singles =

Singles
- 2014 Open GDF Suez de Cagnes-sur-Mer Alpes-Maritimes

Final
- Champion: (Canada) Sharon Fichman
- Runner-up: (Switzerland) Timea Bacsinszky
- Score: 6–2, 6–2

Events
Singles	Doubles
← 2013 ·	Open GDF Suez de Cagnes-sur-Mer Alpes-Maritimes	· 2015 →

Caroline Garcia was the defending champion, having won the event in 2013, but she chose to participate at the Mutua Madrid Open instead.

Sharon Fichman won the tournament, defeating Timea Bacsinszky in the final, 6–2, 6–2.

== Seeds ==
1. (Belgium) Yanina Wickmayer (first round)
2. (Switzerland) Romina Oprandi (first round; retired)
3. (Kazakhstan) Zarina Diyas (first round; retired)
4. (Sweden) Johanna Larsson (second round)
5. (Canada) Sharon Fichman (champion)
6. (Spain) Estrella Cabeza Candela (first round)
7. (Poland) Magda Linette (first round)
8. (Ukraine) ~~Nadiya Kichenok~~ (withdrew)

== Main draw ==
=== Key ===
- Q = Qualifier
- WC = Wild card
- LL = Lucky loser
- Alt = Alternate
- SE = Special exempt
- PR = Protected ranking
- ITF = ITF entry
- JE = Junior exempt
- w/o = Walkover
- r = Retired
- d = Defaulted
- SR = Special ranking

=== Finals ===
Semifinals
(Netherlands) Kiki Bertens	5	3
5	(Canada) Sharon Fichman	7	6
(Switzerland) Timea Bacsinszky	6	6
(France) Mathilde Johansson	1	0

Final
5	(Canada) Sharon Fichman	6	6
(Switzerland) Timea Bacsinszky	2	2

=== Top half ===
First round
1	(Belgium) Y Wickmayer	3	0
Q	(Netherlands) R Hogenkamp	6	6
(Netherlands) K Bertens	6	6^{4}	6
WC	(France) F Ferro	2	7^{7}	2
(United Kingdom) H Watson	6	7^{8}
LL	(Italy) G Gatto-Monticone	4	6^{6}
(France) C Feuerstein	6	6
Q	(Chile) D Seguel	4	2
4	(Sweden) J Larsson	6	6
(Luxembourg) M Minella	1	0
LL	(France) I Ramialison	2	2
WC	(Austria) T Paszek	6	6
(United Kingdom) J Konta	6	6
WC	(France) M Georges	2	1
(Kazakhstan) Y Putintseva	1	6	2
5	(Canada) S Fichman	6	4	6

Second round
Q	(Netherlands) R Hogenkamp	2	1
(Netherlands) K Bertens	6	6
(United Kingdom) H Watson	6	4	7
(France) C Feuerstein	1	6	5
4	(Sweden) J Larsson	6	5	5
WC	(Austria) T Paszek	4	7	7
(United Kingdom) J Konta	4	6	4
5	(Canada) S Fichman	6	0	6

Quarterfinals
(Netherlands) K Bertens	6	6
(United Kingdom) H Watson	3	1
WC	(Austria) T Paszek	2	0
5	(Canada) S Fichman	6	6

Semifinals
(Netherlands) K Bertens	5	3
5	(Canada) S Fichman	7	6

=== Bottom half ===
First round
6	(Spain) E Cabeza Candela	5	3
Q	(United States) S Vickery	7	6
Q	(Australia) A Barty	6	6^{4}	2
(Russia) A Panova	1	7^{7}	6
(Canada) A Wozniak	6	7
(Argentina) M Irigoyen	4	5
(Switzerland) T Bacsinszky	6	3
3	(Kazakhstan) Z Diyas	2	0^{r}
7	(Poland) M Linette	2	6	2
(Ukraine) M Zanevska	6	3	6
(Sweden) S Arvidsson	2	6	7
WC	(France) P Parmentier	6	3	5
(Croatia) M Lučić-Baroni	7^{7}	7^{7}
(France) A Lim	6^{4}	6^{5}
(France) M Johansson	6	3
2	(Switzerland) R Oprandi	0	2^{r}

Second round
Q	(United States) S Vickery	3	7	6
(Russia) A Panova	6	5	3
(Canada) A Wozniak	2	4
(Switzerland) T Bacsinszky	6	6
(Ukraine) M Zanevska	6	6
(Sweden) S Arvidsson	1	2
(Croatia) M Lučić-Baroni	3	2
(France) M Johansson	6	6

Quarterfinals
Q	(United States) S Vickery	0	1^{r}
(Switzerland) T Bacsinszky	6	4
(Ukraine) M Zanevska	4	6	5
(France) M Johansson	6	4	7

Semifinals
(Switzerland) T Bacsinszky	6	6
(France) M Johansson	1	0
