= 2011 Open GDF Suez de Cagnes-sur-Mer Alpes-Maritimes – Singles =

Singles
- 2011 Open GDF Suez de Cagnes-sur-Mer Alpes-Maritimes

Final
- Champion: (Romania) Sorana Cîrstea
- Runner-up: (France) Pauline Parmentier
- Score: 6–7^{(5–7)}, 6–2, 6–2

Events
Singles	Doubles
← 2010 ·	Open GDF Suez de Cagnes-sur-Mer Alpes-Maritimes	· 2012 →

Kaia Kanepi was the defending champion but chose to compete in 2011 Mutua Madrileña Madrid Open instead.
Sorana Cîrstea defeated Pauline Parmentier in the final 6–7^{(5–7)}, 6–2, 6–2.

== Seeds ==
1. (Germany) Kristina Barrois (quarterfinals)
2. (France) Mathilde Johansson (first round)
3. (China) Zhang Shuai (quarterfinals)
4. (Russia) Ksenia Pervak (first round)
5. (Belgium) Kirsten Flipkens (first round)
6. (United Kingdom) Elena Baltacha (semifinals)
7. (Czech Republic) Renata Voráčová (first round)
8. (United Kingdom) Anne Keothavong (first round)

== Draw ==
=== Key ===
- Q = Qualifier
- WC = Wild card
- LL = Lucky loser
- Alt = Alternate
- SE = Special exempt
- PR = Protected ranking
- ITF = ITF entry
- JE = Junior exempt
- w/o = Walkover
- r = Retired
- d = Defaulted
- SR = Special ranking

=== Finals ===
Semifinals
6	(United Kingdom) Elena Baltacha	3	1
(France) Pauline Parmentier	6	6
(Italy) Maria Elena Camerin	6^{1}	4
(Romania) Sorana Cîrstea	7	6

Final
(France) Pauline Parmentier	7	2	2
(Romania) Sorana Cîrstea	6^{5}	6	6

=== Top half ===
First round
1	(Germany) K Barrois	6	6
(Czech Republic) S Záhlavová	2	0
(Belarus) A Yakimova	6	6
(Czech Republic) E Birnerová	4	0
(Russia) V Dolonts	2	6	6
WC	(France) C Garcia	6	3	1
(United States) J Craybas	4	6	2
6	(United Kingdom) E Baltacha	6	1	6
3	(China) S Zhang	6	4	6
WC	(France) K Mladenovic	0	6	3
(Australia) S Ferguson	2	6^{4}
WC	(France) O Sanchez	6	7
Q	(Germany) M Barthel	0	6	6^{7}
(Romania) I-C Begu	6	1	7
(France) P Parmentier	6	6
7	(Czech Republic) R Voráčová	2	3

Second round
1	(Germany) K Barrois	6	7
(Belarus) A Yakimova	3	5
(Russia) V Dolonts	3	6	3
6	(United Kingdom) E Baltacha	6	3	6
3	(China) S Zhang	6	5	6
WC	(France) O Sanchez	3	7	0
(Romania) I-C Begu	3	2
(France) P Parmentier	6	6

Quarterfinals
1	(Germany) K Barrois	7	4	4
6	(United Kingdom) E Baltacha	5	6	6
3	(China) S Zhang	1	1
(France) P Parmentier	6	6

Semifinals
6	(United Kingdom) E Baltacha	3	1
(France) P Parmentier	6	6

=== Bottom half ===
First round
5	(Belgium) K Flipkens	0	0
(Italy) ME Camerin	6	6
Q	(Russia) V Savinykh	4	2
(United Kingdom) H Watson	6	6
(Croatia) P Martić	6^{6}	3
WC	(France) S Foretz Gacon	7	6
(Russia) A Pivovarova	6	6
4	(Russia) K Pervak	2	3
8	(United Kingdom) A Keothavong	3	4
(Georgia (country)) A Tatishvili	6	6
Q	(Slovenia) A Klepač	6	4	0
(Romania) S Cîrstea	4	6	6
(United States) J Hampton	6	6
(China) X Han	0	1
Q	(Spain) L Arruabarrena-Vecino	2	6	6
2	(France) M Johansson	6	1	2

Second round
(Italy) ME Camerin	1	7	6
(United Kingdom) H Watson	6	6^{7}	1
WC	(France) S Foretz Gacon	7	4	2
(Russia) A Pivovarova	5	6	6
(Georgia (country)) A Tatishvili	6	3	3
(Romania) S Cîrstea	1	6	6
(United States) J Hampton	4	2
Q	(Spain) L Arruabarrena-Vecino	6	6

Quarterfinals
(Italy) ME Camerin	7	6
(Russia) A Pivovarova	5	1
(Romania) S Cîrstea	3	6	6
Q	(Spain) L Arruabarrena-Vecino	6	2	3

Semifinals
(Italy) ME Camerin	6^{1}	1
(Romania) S Cîrstea	7	6
