= 2018 Open de Cagnes-sur-Mer – Singles =

Singles
- 2018 Open de Cagnes-sur-Mer

Final
- Champion: (Sweden) Rebecca Peterson
- Runner-up: (Ukraine) Dayana Yastremska
- Score: 6–4, 7–5

Events
Singles	Doubles
← 2017 ·	Open de Cagnes-sur-Mer	· 2019 →

Beatriz Haddad Maia was the defending champion, but chose to compete at the 2018 Mutua Madrid Open instead.

Rebecca Peterson won the title, defeating Dayana Yastremska in the final, 6–4, 7–5.

== Seeds ==
1. (Germany) Carina Witthöft (first round)
2. (France) Pauline Parmentier (first round)
3. (France) Océane Dodin (second round)
4. (Germany) Andrea Petkovic (semifinals)
5. (Slovakia) Viktória Kužmová (quarterfinals)
6. (Netherlands) Arantxa Rus (first round)
7. (Croatia) Jana Fett (first round)
8. (Sweden) Rebecca Peterson (champion)

== Draw ==
=== Key ===
- Q = Qualifier
- WC = Wild card
- LL = Lucky loser
- Alt = Alternate
- SE = Special exempt
- PR = Protected ranking
- ITF = ITF entry
- JE = Junior exempt
- w/o = Walkover
- r = Retired
- d = Defaulted
- SR = Special ranking

=== Finals ===
Semifinals
(Tunisia) Ons Jabeur	2	3
8	(Sweden) Rebecca Peterson	6	6
4/WC	(Germany) Andrea Petkovic	2	1
Q	(Ukraine) Dayana Yastremska	6	6

Final
8	(Sweden) Rebecca Peterson	6	7
Q	(Ukraine) Dayana Yastremska	4	5

=== Top half ===
First round
1	(Germany) C Witthöft	3	4
Q	(Netherlands) B Schoofs	6	6
(Montenegro) D Kovinić	6	6
(Canada) C Zhao	3	2
(Russia) A Blinkova	5	6	4
Q	(Romania) A Dulgheru	7	4	6
(Tunisia) O Jabeur	6	6
6	(Netherlands) A Rus	0	3
3	(France) O Dodin	6	6
(Belgium) M Zanevska	3	3
Q	(Chile) D Seguel	6	6
(Slovenia) D Jakupović	4	3
WC	(France) F Ferro	6	3	4
(Germany) T Korpatsch	4	6	6
WC	(France) A Hesse	0	0
8	(Sweden) R Peterson	6	6

Second round
Q	(Netherlands) B Schoofs	6	6
(Montenegro) D Kovinić	4	4
Q	(Romania) A Dulgheru	1	2
(Tunisia) O Jabeur	6	6
3	(France) O Dodin	1	7	1
Q	(Chile) D Seguel	6	5	6
(Germany) T Korpatsch	2	1
8	(Sweden) R Peterson	6	6

Quarterfinals
Q	(Netherlands) B Schoofs	2	2
(Tunisia) O Jabeur	6	6
Q	(Chile) D Seguel	3	4
8	(Sweden) R Peterson	6	6

Semifinals
(Tunisia) O Jabeur	2	3
8	(Sweden) R Peterson	6	6

=== Bottom half ===
First round
5	(Slovakia) V Kužmová	6	6
LL	(Australia) P Hon	3	2
(Czech Republic) T Martincová	4	2
(Italy) J Paolini	6	6
(Poland) M Fręch	2	3
(Russia) E Rodina	6	6
WC	(Canada) E Bouchard
4/WC	(Germany) A Petkovic	w/o
7	(Croatia) J Fett	2	6^{3}
(United States) N Gibbs	6	7^{7}
(Switzerland) V Golubic	6	4	6
LL	(Australia) J Fourlis	3	6	1
(Australia) O Rogowska	5	2
Q	(Ukraine) D Yastremska	7	6
(Switzerland) J Teichmann	6	6^{4}	6
2	(France) P Parmentier	2	7^{7}	4

Second round
5	(Slovakia) V Kužmová	7	6
(Italy) J Paolini	5	2
(Russia) E Rodina	0	3
4/WC	(Germany) A Petkovic	6	6
(United States) N Gibbs	4	6^{5}
(Switzerland) V Golubic	6	7^{7}
Q	(Ukraine) D Yastremska	6	6
(Switzerland) J Teichmann	3	3

Quarterfinals
5	(Slovakia) V Kužmová	6	2	1
4/WC	(Germany) A Petkovic	2	6	6
(Switzerland) V Golubic	5	6	4
Q	(Ukraine) D Yastremska	7	1	6

Semifinals
4/WC	(Germany) A Petkovic	2	1
Q	(Ukraine) D Yastremska	6	6
