= 2020 Open de Cagnes-sur-Mer – Singles =

Singles
- 2020 Open de Cagnes-sur-Mer

Final
- Champion: (Spain) Sara Sorribes Tormo
- Runner-up: (Romania) Irina Bara
- Score: 6–3, 6–4

Events
| Singles | Doubles |
| ← 2019 · | Open de Cagnes-sur-Mer | · 2021 → |

Christina McHale was the defending champion but chose to compete at the 2020 Italian Open instead.

Sara Sorribes Tormo won the title, defeating Irina Bara in the final, 6–3, 6–4.

== Seeds ==
1. (Spain) Sara Sorribes Tormo (champion)
2. (Serbia) Nina Stojanović (first round)
3. (Russia) Varvara Gracheva (semifinals)
4. (Belgium) Greet Minnen (first round)
5. (Ukraine) Katarina Zavatska (second round)
6. (France) Océane Dodin (quarterfinals, retired)
7. (Australia) Maddison Inglis (first round)
8. (Belgium) Ysaline Bonaventure (first round)

== Draw ==
=== Key ===
- Q = Qualifier
- WC = Wild card
- LL = Lucky loser
- Alt = Alternate
- SE = Special exempt
- PR = Protected ranking
- ITF = ITF entry
- JE = Junior exempt
- w/o = Walkover
- r = Retired
- d = Defaulted
- SR = Special ranking

=== Finals ===
Semifinals
1 | (Spain) Sara Sorribes Tormo | 6 | 7^{7}
(Bulgaria) Viktoriya Tomova | 1 | 6^{5}
3 | (Russia) Varvara Gracheva | 5 | 4
(Romania) Irina Bara | 7 | 6

Final
1 | (Spain) Sara Sorribes Tormo | 6 | 6
(Romania) Irina Bara | 3 | 4

=== Top half ===
First round
1 | (Spain) S Sorribes Tormo | 6 | 6
(United States) W Osuigwe | 1 | 2
Q | (United States) V Lepchenko | 6 | 6
(United States) C McNally | 4 | 3
SE | (Spain) C Bucșa | 4 | 2
(Switzerland) V Golubic | 6 | 6
WC | (France) C Paquet | 6 | 4 | 4
5 | (Ukraine) K Zavatska | 4 | 6 | 6
4 | (Belgium) G Minnen | 1 | 0
Q | (Australia) D Gavrilova | 6 | 6
JE | (France) C Burel | 6 | 7^{7}
WC | (France) H Tan | 2 | 6^{4}
Q | (United Kingdom) E Silva | 5 | 7 | 2
Q | (Chile) D Seguel | 7 | 5 | 6
(Bulgaria) V Tomova | 6 | 6
8 | (Belgium) Y Bonaventure | 2 | 2

Second round
1 | (Spain) S Sorribes Tormo | 6 | 6
Q | (United States) V Lepchenko | 0 | 3
(Switzerland) V Golubic | 6 | 6
5 | (Ukraine) K Zavatska | 2 | 3
Q | (Australia) D Gavrilova | 4 | 6 | 6
JE | (France) C Burel | 6 | 4 | 3
Q | (Chile) D Seguel | 7^{7} | 2 | 4
(Bulgaria) V Tomova | 6^{1} | 6 | 6

Quarterfinals
1 | (Spain) S Sorribes Tormo | 6 | 6
(Switzerland) V Golubic | 0 | 2
Q | (Australia) D Gavrilova | 3 | 1
(Bulgaria) V Tomova | 6 | 6

Semifinals
1 | (Spain) S Sorribes Tormo | 6 | 7^{7}
(Bulgaria) V Tomova | 1 | 6^{5}

=== Bottom half ===
First round
6 | (France) O Dodin | 6 | 4 | 6
Q | (France) S Janicijevic | 3 | 6 | 1
(Ukraine) A Kalinina | 2 | 3
(United States) F Di Lorenzo | 6 | 6
WC | (Georgia (country)) M Bolkvadze | 3 | 6 | 7^{7}
LL | (Romania) N Dascălu | 6 | 2 | 6^{5}
(Japan) K Nara | 3 | 2
3 | (Russia) V Gracheva | 6 | 6
7 | (Australia) M Inglis | 3 | 2
Q | (Georgia (country)) E Gorgodze | 6 | 6
(Romania) I Bara | 6 | 6
Q | (France) C Monnet | 1 | 3
WC | (France) D Parry | 6^{0} | 6 | 2
(Australia) L Cabrera | 7^{7} | 3 | 6
Q | (France) E Jacquemot | 6 | 2 | 6
2 | (Serbia) N Stojanović | 3 | 6 | 3

Second round
6 | (France) O Dodin | 6 | 6
(United States) F Di Lorenzo | 2 | 3
WC | (Georgia (country)) M Bolkvadze | 2 | 3
3 | (Russia) V Gracheva | 6 | 6
Q | (Georgia (country)) E Gorgodze | 6 | 3 | 3
(Romania) I Bara | 2 | 6 | 6
(Australia) L Cabrera | w/o
Q | (France) E Jacquemot

Quarterfinals
6 | (France) O Dodin | 3 | 0^{r}
3 | (Russia) V Gracheva | 6 | 1
(Romania) I Bara | w/o
(Australia) L Cabrera

Semifinals
3 | (Russia) V Gracheva | 5 | 4
(Romania) I Bara | 7 | 6
