= 2019 Open de Cagnes-sur-Mer – Singles =

Singles
- 2019 Open de Cagnes-sur-Mer

Final
- Champion: (United States) Christina McHale
- Runner-up: (Switzerland) Stefanie Vögele
- Score: 7–6^{(7–4)}, 6–2

Events
Singles	Doubles
← 2018 ·	Open de Cagnes-sur-Mer	· 2020 →

Rebecca Peterson was the defending champion, but chose not to participate.

Christina McHale won the title, defeating Stefanie Vögele in the final, 7–6^{(7–4)}, 6–2.

== Seeds ==
1. (Russia) Vitalia Diatchenko (first round)
2. (United States) Bernarda Pera (first round)
3. (Switzerland) Stefanie Vögele (final)
4. (Switzerland) Timea Bacsinszky (semifinals)
5. (Japan) Nao Hibino (first round)
6. (Russia) Anna Blinkova (second round)
7. (Brazil) Beatriz Haddad Maia (quarterfinals)
8. (Israel) Julia Glushko (first round)

== Draw ==
=== Key ===
- Q = Qualifier
- WC = Wild card
- LL = Lucky loser
- Alt = Alternate
- SE = Special exempt
- PR = Protected ranking
- ITF = ITF entry
- JE = Junior exempt
- w/o = Walkover
- r = Retired
- d = Defaulted
- SR = Special ranking

=== Finals ===
Semifinals
(Hungary) Tímea Babos	6	1	3
3	(Switzerland) Stefanie Vögele	3	6	6
4	(Switzerland) Timea Bacsinszky	6^{7}	5
(United States) Christina McHale	7^{9}	7

Final
3	(Switzerland) Stefanie Vögele	6^{4}	2
(United States) Christina McHale	7^{7}	6

=== Top half ===
First round
1	(Russia) V Diatchenko	3	6^{2}
(Australia) P Hon	6	7^{7}
(Hungary) T Babos	6	6
WC	(France) D Parry	4	2
(Bulgaria) V Tomova	0	4
(United States) V Lepchenko	6	6
Q	(Russia) V Gracheva	6	6
5	(Japan) N Hibino	1	0
3	(Switzerland) S Vögele	6	5	6
(Georgia (country)) E Gorgodze	3	7	2
SE	(Ukraine) K Zavatska	2	0
(Germany) T Korpatsch	6	6
Q	(France) M Témin	1	6	3
Q	(France) M Yerolymos	6	2	6
WC	(France) J Gervais	0	0
7	(Brazil) B Haddad Maia	6	6

Second round
(Australia) P Hon	6^{4}	6^{3}
(Hungary) T Babos	7^{7}	7^{7}
(United States) V Lepchenko	7	6
Q	(Russia) V Gracheva	5	4
3	(Switzerland) S Vögele	7^{7}	2	6
(Germany) T Korpatsch	6^{2}	6	3
Q	(France) M Yerolymos	3	4
7	(Brazil) B Haddad Maia	6	6

Quarterfinals
(Hungary) T Babos	6	6
(United States) V Lepchenko	4	3
3	(Switzerland) S Vögele	1	6	7
7	(Brazil) B Haddad Maia	6	4	5

Semifinals
(Hungary) T Babos	6	1	3
3	(Switzerland) S Vögele	3	6	6

=== Bottom half ===
First round
8	(Israel) J Glushko	4	1
(Switzerland) C Perrin	6	6
(Belgium) Y Wickmayer	3	2
Q	(Switzerland) Y In-Albon	6	6
Q	(France) I Ramialison	6	6
WC	(United States) G Price	3	3
LL	(Russia) A Kalinskaya	0	4
4	(Switzerland) T Bacsinszky	6	6
6	(Russia) A Blinkova	7^{7}	6
Q	(Brazil) C Alves	6^{2}	4
Q	(France) A Lim	2	2
Q	(Italy) M Di Giuseppe	6	6
WC	(France) H Tan	3	1
(Czech Republic) T Martincová	6	6
(United States) C McHale	6	6
2	(United States) B Pera	1	4

Second round
(Switzerland) C Perrin	6	6
Q	(Switzerland) Y In-Albon	1	3
Q	(France) I Ramialison	3	1
4	(Switzerland) T Bacsinszky	6	6
6	(Russia) A Blinkova	6^{8}	1
Q	(Italy) M Di Giuseppe	7^{10}	6
(Czech Republic) T Martincová	1	4
(United States) C McHale	6	6

Quarterfinals
(Switzerland) C Perrin	1	1
4	(Switzerland) T Bacsinszky	6	6
Q	(Italy) M Di Giuseppe	6^{3}	1
(United States) C McHale	7^{7}	6

Semifinals
4	(Switzerland) T Bacsinszky	6^{7}	5
(United States) C McHale	7^{9}	7
