= 2013 Open GDF Suez de Cagnes-sur-Mer Alpes-Maritimes – Singles =

Singles
- 2013 Open GDF Suez de Cagnes-sur-Mer Alpes-Maritimes

Final
- Champion: (France) Caroline Garcia
- Runner-up: (Ukraine) Maryna Zanevska
- Score: 6–0, 4–6, 6–3

Events
Singles	Doubles
← 2012 ·	Open GDF Suez de Cagnes-sur-Mer Alpes-Maritimes	· 2014 →

Yulia Putintseva was the defending champion, having won the event in 2012, but chose not to defend her title.

Wild card Caroline Garcia won the title, defeating lucky loser Maryna Zanevska in the final, 6–0, 4–6, 6–3.

== Seeds ==
1. (Switzerland) Romina Oprandi (semifinals)
2. (Luxembourg) Mandy Minella (quarterfinals)
3. (France) Pauline Parmentier (first round)
4. (Netherlands) Arantxa Rus (second round)
5. (Japan) Misaki Doi (first round)
6. (Ukraine) Elina Svitolina (second round)
7. (Romania) Alexandra Cadanțu (second round)
8. (Croatia) Petra Martić (first round)

== Main draw ==
=== Key ===
- Q = Qualifier
- WC = Wild card
- LL = Lucky loser
- Alt = Alternate
- SE = Special exempt
- PR = Protected ranking
- ITF = ITF entry
- JE = Junior exempt
- w/o = Walkover
- r = Retired
- d = Defaulted
- SR = Special ranking

=== Finals ===
Semifinals
1	(Switzerland) Romina Oprandi	4	2
LL	(Ukraine) Maryna Zanevska	6	6
WC	(France) Caroline Garcia	w/o
(Spain) Estrella Cabeza Candela

Final
LL	(Ukraine) Maryna Zanevska	0	6	3
WC	(France) Caroline Garcia	6	4	6

=== Top half ===
First round
1	(Switzerland) R Oprandi	6^{4}	6	6
(France) C Feuerstein	7^{7}	4	3
(Brazil) T Pereira	6	6
(Israel) S Pe'er	2	3
(Russia) N Bratchikova	6	2	1
WC	(France) V Razzano	2	6	6
WC	(Kazakhstan) S Karatantcheva	6	3	2
7	(Romania) A Cadanțu	0	6	6
3	(France) P Parmentier	2	3
Q	(Germany) A Schäfer	6	6
(Austria) P Mayr-Achleitner	6	6^{4}	2
(United States) V King	4	7^{7}	6
LL	(Ukraine) M Zanevska	1	6	7^{9}
(United States) J Cohen	6	4	6^{7}
(Canada) S Fichman	6	7^{7}
5	(Japan) M Doi	3	6^{4}

Second round
1	(Switzerland) R Oprandi	6	6
(Brazil) T Pereira	2	4
WC	(France) V Razzano	4	6	6
7	(Romania) A Cadanțu	6	0	0
Q	(Germany) A Schäfer	6	3	1
(United States) V King	3	6	6
LL	(Ukraine) M Zanevska	3	6	6
(Canada) S Fichman	6	4	2

Quarterfinals
1	(Switzerland) R Oprandi	6	6
WC	(France) V Razzano	1	4
(United States) V King	6	3	4
LL	(Ukraine) M Zanevska	0	6	6

Semifinals
1	(Switzerland) R Oprandi	4	2
LL	(Ukraine) M Zanevska	6	6

=== Bottom half ===
First round
8	(Croatia) P Martić	1	7	3
(Colombia) C Castaño	6	5	6
Q	(Chile) D Seguel	3	6	1
WC	(France) C Garcia	6	3	6
(Germany) T Maria	6	6
(Russia) A Panova	4	3
(France) I Pavlovic	4	4
4	(Netherlands) A Rus	6	6
6	(Ukraine) E Svitolina	6	3	6
(Chinese Taipei) K-c Chang	3	6	0
(Italy) ME Camerin	5	2
(Spain) E Cabeza Candela	7	6
WC	(France) M Georges	2	6	6
Q	(Russia) V Dushevina	6	4	2
Q	(France) I Ramialison	4	5
2	(Luxembourg) M Minella	6	7

Second round
(Colombia) C Castaño	1	6	3
WC	(France) C Garcia	6	1	6
(Germany) T Maria	7	7^{7}
4	(Netherlands) A Rus	5	6^{2}
6	(Ukraine) E Svitolina	1	4
(Spain) E Cabeza Candela	6	6
WC	(France) M Georges	6	2	2
2	(Luxembourg) M Minella	2	6	6

Quarterfinals
WC	(France) C Garcia	3	7	6
(Germany) T Maria	6	5	2
(Spain) E Cabeza Candela	6	6
2	(Luxembourg) M Minella	4	2

Semifinals
WC	(France) C Garcia	w/o
(Spain) E Cabeza Candela
