= 2017 Open de Cagnes-sur-Mer Alpes-Maritimes – Doubles =

Doubles
- 2017 Open de Cagnes-sur-Mer Alpes-Maritimes

Final
- Champion: (Chinese Taipei) Chang Kai-chen (Chinese Taipei) Hsieh Su-wei
- Runner-up: (Romania) Raluca Olaru (Czech Republic) Renata Voráčová
- Score: 7–5, 6–1

Events
Singles	Doubles
← 2016 ·	Open de Cagnes-sur-Mer Alpes-Maritimes	· 2018 →

Andreea Mitu and Demi Schuurs were the defending champions, but both players chose not to participate.

Chang Kai-chen and Hsieh Su-wei won the title, defeating top seeds Raluca Olaru and Renata Voráčová in the final, 7–5, 6–1.

== Seeds ==
1. (Romania) Raluca Olaru / (Czech Republic) Renata Voráčová (final)
2. (United States) Nicole Melichar / (United Kingdom) Anna Smith (semifinals)
3. (Serbia) Nina Stojanović / (United Kingdom) Heather Watson (first round)
4. (Argentina) María Irigoyen / (Poland) Paula Kania (quarterfinals)

== Draw ==
=== Key ===
- Q = Qualifier
- WC = Wild card
- LL = Lucky loser
- Alt = Alternate
- SE = Special exempt
- PR = Protected ranking
- ITF = ITF entry
- JE = Junior exempt
- w/o = Walkover
- r = Retired
- d = Defaulted
- SR = Special ranking

First round
1	(Romania) R Olaru (Czech Republic) R Voráčová	6	6
(Croatia) J Fett (United States) N Gibbs	2	4
(Russia) I Khromacheva (Belgium) M Zanevska	6	6
(Czech Republic) K Kramperová (Czech Republic) T Martincová	1	4
3	(Serbia) N Stojanović (United Kingdom) H Watson	2	6	[6]
(France) F Ferro (France) M Yerolymos	6	4	[10]
(Russia) A Blinkova (Sweden) C Lister	6	6
(Australia) L Cabrera (Russia) E Yashina	4	1
(France) A Lim (France) S Reix	4	2
(Chinese Taipei) K-c Chang (Chinese Taipei) S-w Hsieh	6	6
(Montenegro) D Kovinić (Belgium) Y Wickmayer	6	4	[9]
4	(Argentina) M Irigoyen (Poland) P Kania	3	6	[11]
(Brazil) L Pigossi (Switzerland) J Teichmann	w/o
WC	(France) A Albié (France) M Témin
(Paraguay) M González (Brazil) T Pereira	3	2
2	(United States) N Melichar (United Kingdom) A Smith	6	6

Quarterfinals
1	(Romania) R Olaru (Czech Republic) R Voráčová	7	6
(Russia) I Khromacheva (Belgium) M Zanevska	5	4
(France) F Ferro (France) M Yerolymos	1	0
(Russia) A Blinkova (Sweden) C Lister	6	6
(Chinese Taipei) K-c Chang (Chinese Taipei) S-w Hsieh	7^{7}	6
4	(Argentina) M Irigoyen (Poland) P Kania	6^{4}	4
(Brazil) L Pigossi (Switzerland) J Teichmann	2	5
2	(United States) N Melichar (United Kingdom) A Smith	6	7

Semifinals
1	(Romania) R Olaru (Czech Republic) R Voráčová	6	6
(Russia) A Blinkova (Sweden) C Lister	3	3
(Chinese Taipei) K-c Chang (Chinese Taipei) S-w Hsieh	2	6	[10]
2	(United States) N Melichar (United Kingdom) A Smith	6	3	[8]

Final
1	(Romania) R Olaru (Czech Republic) R Voráčová	5	1
(Chinese Taipei) K-c Chang (Chinese Taipei) S-w Hsieh	7	6
