= 2020 Open de Cagnes-sur-Mer =

- Date: 14–20 September 2020
- Edition: 23rd
- Category: ITF Women's World Tennis Tour
- Prize money: $80,000
- Surface: Clay
- Location: Cagnes-sur-Mer, France

Champions

Singles
- (Spain) Sara Sorribes Tormo

Doubles
- (United Kingdom) Samantha Murray Sharan / (Germany) Julia Wachaczyk
← 2019 ·	Open de Cagnes-sur-Mer	· 2021 →

The 2020 Open de Cagnes-sur-Mer was a professional tennis tournament played on outdoor clay courts. It was the twenty-third edition of the tournament which was part of the 2020 ITF Women's World Tennis Tour. It took place in Cagnes-sur-Mer, France between 14 and 20 September 2020.

== Singles main-draw entrants ==
=== Seeds ===
Country	Player	Rank^{1}	Seed
ESP	Sara Sorribes Tormo	82	1
SRB	Nina Stojanović	86	2
RUS	Varvara Gracheva	102	3
BEL	Greet Minnen	107	4
UKR	Katarina Zavatska	108	5
FRA	Océane Dodin	115	6
AUS	Maddison Inglis	119	7
BEL	Ysaline Bonaventure	121	8

- ^{1} Rankings are as of 31 August 2020.

=== Other entrants ===
The following players received wildcards into the singles main draw:

- (Georgia (country)) Mariam Bolkvadze
- (France) Chloé Paquet
- (France) Diane Parry
- (France) Harmony Tan

The following player received entry using a junior exempt:

- (France) Clara Burel

The following player received entry through a special exempt:

- (Spain) Cristina Bucșa

The following players received entry from the qualifying draw:

- (Australia) Daria Gavrilova
- (Georgia (country)) Ekaterine Gorgodze
- (France) Elsa Jacquemot
- (France) Séléna Janicijevic
- (United States) Varvara Lepchenko
- (France) Carole Monnet
- (Chile) Daniela Seguel
- (United Kingdom) Eden Silva

The following player received entry as a lucky loser:

- (Romania) Nicoleta Dascălu

== Champions ==
=== Singles ===
- (Spain) Sara Sorribes Tormo def. (Romania) Irina Bara, 6–3, 6–4

=== Doubles ===
- (United Kingdom) Samantha Murray Sharan / (Germany) Julia Wachaczyk def. (Poland) Paula Kania / (Poland) Katarzyna Piter, 7–5, 6–2
