= 2017 Open de Cagnes-sur-Mer Alpes-Maritimes – Singles =

Singles
- 2017 Open de Cagnes-sur-Mer Alpes-Maritimes

Final
- Champion: (Brazil) Beatriz Haddad Maia
- Runner-up: (Switzerland) Jil Teichmann
- Score: 6–3, 6–3

Events
Singles	Doubles
← 2016 ·	Open de Cagnes-sur-Mer Alpes-Maritimes	· 2018 →

Magda Linette was the defending champion, but she chose to participate at the 2017 Mutua Madrid Open instead.

Beatriz Haddad Maia won the title, defeating Jil Teichmann in the final, 6–3, 6–3.

== Seeds ==
1. (Germany) Carina Witthöft (first round)
2. (Belgium) Yanina Wickmayer (first round)
3. (Russia) Irina Khromacheva (first round)
4. (Germany) Tatjana Maria (second round)
5. (Montenegro) Danka Kovinić (semifinal)
6. (Chinese Taipei) Hsieh Su-wei (first round)
7. (United Kingdom) Heather Watson (second round)
8. (Chinese Taipei) Chang Kai-chen (first round)

== Draw ==
=== Key ===
- Q = Qualifier
- WC = Wild card
- LL = Lucky loser
- Alt = Alternate
- SE = Special exempt
- PR = Protected ranking
- ITF = ITF entry
- JE = Junior exempt
- w/o = Walkover
- r = Retired
- d = Defaulted
- SR = Special ranking

=== Finals ===
Semifinals
(Brazil) Beatriz Haddad Maia	6	6
5	(Montenegro) Danka Kovinić	2	2
(Switzerland) Jil Teichmann	6	6
Q	(Ukraine) Katarina Zavatska	3	2

Final
(Brazil) Beatriz Haddad Maia	6	6
(Switzerland) Jil Teichmann	3	3

=== Top half ===
First round
1	(Germany) C Witthöft	4	7^{7}	2
Q	(Russia) E Kulichkova	6	6^{4}	6
WC	(France) C Paquet	6	7^{7}
(Australia) L Cabrera	2	6^{2}
(Russia) A Blinkova	6	6
(Bulgaria) V Tomova	2	3
(Brazil) B Haddad Maia	6	6
8	(Chinese Taipei) K-c Chang	0	3
3	(Russia) I Khromacheva	1	1
Q	(Croatia) J Fett	6	6
(Serbia) I Jorović	6	5	6^{1}
(Czech Republic) T Martincová	2	7	7^{7}
(Brazil) T Pereira	6	7
(United States) N Gibbs	4	5
WC	(France) F Ferro	0	0
5	(Montenegro) D Kovinić	6	6

Second round
Q	(Russia) E Kulichkova	7	6
WC	(France) C Paquet	5	3
(Russia) A Blinkova	3	4
(Brazil) B Haddad Maia	6	6
Q	(Croatia) J Fett	6	7
(Czech Republic) T Martincová	2	5
(Brazil) T Pereira	6^{4}	1
5	(Montenegro) D Kovinić	7^{7}	6

Quarterfinals
Q	(Russia) E Kulichkova	2	1
(Brazil) B Haddad Maia	6	6
Q	(Croatia) J Fett	7^{9}	4	4
5	(Montenegro) D Kovinić	6^{7}	6	6

Semifinals
(Brazil) B Haddad Maia	6	6
5	(Montenegro) D Kovinić	2	2

=== Bottom half ===
First round
6	(Chinese Taipei) S-w Hsieh	4	6	3
WC	(France) A Hesse	6	2	6
(Belgium) A Van Uytvanck	6	7
PR	(Romania) A Dulgheru	3	5
(Switzerland) J Teichmann	6	6
WC	(France) T Andrianjafitrimo	4	0
(Paraguay) M González	5	6	3
4	(Germany) T Maria	7	1	6
7	(United Kingdom) H Watson	7^{7}	4	6
(Belarus) A Sabalenka	6^{3}	6	2
(France) V Razzano	6^{3}	6	4
Q	(France) A Lim	7^{7}	3	6
(Belgium) M Zanevska	6	6
(Serbia) N Stojanović	4	3
Q	(Ukraine) K Zavatska	7	6
2	(Belgium) Y Wickmayer	5	1

Second round
WC	(France) A Hesse	5	0
(Belgium) A Van Uytvanck	7	6
(Switzerland) J Teichmann	6	7
4	(Germany) T Maria	2	5
7	(United Kingdom) H Watson	3	5
Q	(France) A Lim	6	7
(Belgium) M Zanevska	4	3
Q	(Ukraine) K Zavatska	6	6

Quarterfinals
(Belgium) A Van Uytvanck	4	2
(Switzerland) J Teichmann	6	6
Q	(France) A Lim	2	2
Q	(Ukraine) K Zavatska	6	6

Semifinals
(Switzerland) J Teichmann	6	6
Q	(Ukraine) K Zavatska	3	2
