= 2011 Open GDF Suez de Cagnes-sur-Mer Alpes-Maritimes – Doubles =

Doubles
- 2011 Open GDF Suez de Cagnes-sur-Mer Alpes-Maritimes

Final
- Champions: (Germany) Anna-Lena Grönefeld (Croatia) Petra Martić
- Runners-up: (Croatia) Darija Jurak (Czech Republic) Renata Voráčová
- Score: 1–6, 6–2, [11–9]

Events
Singles	Doubles
← 2010 ·	Open GDF Suez de Cagnes-sur-Mer Alpes-Maritimes	· 2012 →

Mervana Jugić-Salkić and Darija Jurak were the defending champions; however, Jugić-Salkić decided not to participate. Jurak partnered up with Renata Voráčová and lost in the final to Anna-Lena Grönefeld and Petra Martić 1–6, 6–2, [11–9].

== Seeds ==
1. (Croatia) Darija Jurak / (Czech Republic) Renata Voráčová (final)
2. (Germany) Anna-Lena Grönefeld / (Croatia) Petra Martić (champions)
3. (Austria) Sandra Klemenschits / (Slovenia) Andreja Klepač (semifinals)
4. (Czech Republic) Eva Birnerová / (China) Zhang Shuai (first round)

== Draw ==
=== Key ===
- Q = Qualifier
- WC = Wild card
- LL = Lucky loser
- Alt = Alternate
- SE = Special exempt
- PR = Protected ranking
- ITF = ITF entry
- JE = Junior exempt
- w/o = Walkover
- r = Retired
- d = Defaulted
- SR = Special ranking

=== Draw ===
First round
1	(Croatia) D Jurak (Czech Republic) R Voráčová	6	6
(Romania) S Cîrstea (United Kingdom) H Watson	3	3
(Romania) I-C Begu (Australia) S Peers	2	6	[10]
WC	(France) K Mladenovic (France) P Parmentier	6	0	[7]
4	(Czech Republic) E Birnerová (China) S Zhang	0	2
WC	(France) C de Gubernatis (France) A Ferrand	6	6
(Italy) ME Camerin (France) S Foretz Gacon
(Russia) V Savinykh (Georgia (country)) A Tatishvili	w/o
(United States) J Craybas (United States) J Hampton	0	6	[10]
WC	(France) C Garcia (France) A Védy	6	3	[5]
(Russia) A Panova (Russia) K Pervak	0	1
3	(Austria) S Klemenschits (Slovenia) A Klepač	6	6
(Latvia) L Dekmeijere (Russia) V Dolonts	7	6
(United Kingdom) A Keothavong (Australia) J Moore	6^{2}	2
(United States) L Lee-Waters (United States) M Moulton-Levy	4	5
2	(Germany) A-L Grönefeld (Croatia) P Martić	6	7

Quarterfinals
1	(Croatia) D Jurak (Czech Republic) R Voráčová	6	6
(Romania) I-C Begu (Australia) S Peers	2	1
WC	(France) C de Gubernatis (France) A Ferrand	6	6
(Russia) V Savinykh (Georgia (country)) A Tatishvili	3	2
(United States) J Craybas (United States) J Hampton	6	6^{7}	[4]
3	(Austria) S Klemenschits (Slovenia) A Klepač	3	7	[10]
(Latvia) L Dekmeijere (Russia) V Dolonts	3	6^{4}
2	(Germany) A-L Grönefeld (Croatia) P Martić	6	7

Semifinals
1	(Croatia) D Jurak (Czech Republic) R Voráčová	6	6
WC	(France) C de Gubernatis (France) A Ferrand	4	2
3	(Austria) S Klemenschits (Slovenia) A Klepač	2	1
2	(Germany) A-L Grönefeld (Croatia) P Martić	6	6

Final
1	(Croatia) D Jurak (Czech Republic) R Voráčová	6	2	[9]
2	(Germany) A-L Grönefeld (Croatia) P Martić	1	6	[11]
