= 2012 Open GDF Suez de Cagnes-sur-Mer Alpes-Maritimes – Singles =

Singles
- 2012 Open GDF Suez de Cagnes-sur-Mer Alpes-Maritimes

Final
- Champion: (Russia) Yulia Putintseva
- Runner-up: (Austria) Patricia Mayr-Achleitner
- Score: 6–2, 6–1

Events
Singles	Doubles
← 2011 ·	Open GDF Suez de Cagnes-sur-Mer Alpes-Maritimes	· 2013 →

Sorana Cîrstea was the defending champion but decided to play at the 2012 Mutua Madrid Open instead.

Yulia Putintseva won the title defeating Patricia Mayr-Achleitner in the final 6–2, 6–1.

== Seeds ==
1. (United Kingdom) Elena Baltacha (first round)
2. (Hungary) Tímea Babos (first round)
3. (Romania) Alexandra Cadanțu (quarterfinals)
4. (United Kingdom) Anne Keothavong (first round)
5. (Russia) Alexandra Panova (second round)
6. (Japan) Ayumi Morita (second round)
7. (Japan) Kimiko Date-Krumm (first round, retired)
8. (France) Stéphanie Foretz Gacon (second round)

== Draw ==
=== Key ===
- Q = Qualifier
- WC = Wild card
- LL = Lucky loser
- Alt = Alternate
- SE = Special exempt
- PR = Protected ranking
- ITF = ITF entry
- JE = Junior exempt
- w/o = Walkover
- r = Retired
- d = Defaulted
- SR = Special ranking

=== Finals ===
Semifinals
(Austria) Patricia Mayr-Achleitner	6	1	2
(Slovakia) Magdaléna Rybáriková	3	6	2^{r}
Q	(Russia) Yulia Putintseva	4	6	6
WC	(France) Caroline Garcia	6	3	2

Final
(Austria) Patricia Mayr-Achleitner	2	1
Q	(Russia) Yulia Putintseva	6	6

=== Top half ===
First round
1	(United Kingdom) E Baltacha	5	6	5
(Germany) K Barrois	7	2	7
Q	(Slovenia) P Rampre	6^{5}	6	5
(Russia) N Bratchikova	7^{7}	2	7
(Austria) P Mayr-Achleitner	6	6
(United States) I Falconi	2	4
(Belarus) A Yakimova	7^{8}	3
7	(Japan) K Date-Krumm	6^{6}	2^{r}
3	(Romania) A Cadanțu	6	7^{7}
(Romania) E Gallovits-Hall	4	6^{5}
(United Kingdom) H Watson	2	6	6
(Czech Republic) E Birnerová	6	4	1
(Slovakia) M Rybáriková	6
Q	(United Kingdom) L Robson	1	r
WC	(France) A Rezaï	4	5
6	(Japan) A Morita	6	7

Second round
(Germany) K Barrois	7	6
(Russia) N Bratchikova	5	1
(Austria) P Mayr-Achleitner	6	6^{3}	6
(Belarus) A Yakimova	1	7^{7}	3
3	(Romania) A Cadanțu	6	6
(United Kingdom) H Watson	1	4
(Slovakia) M Rybáriková	7^{7}	7
6	(Japan) A Morita	6^{3}	5

Quarterfinals
(Germany) K Barrois	4	2
(Austria) P Mayr-Achleitner	6	6
3	(Romania) A Cadanțu	0	3
(Slovakia) M Rybáriková	6	6

Semifinals
(Austria) P Mayr-Achleitner	6	1	2
(Slovakia) M Rybáriková	3	6	2^{r}

=== Bottom half ===
First round
5	(Russia) A Panova	7	6
(Uzbekistan) A Amanmuradova	5	0
Q	(Russia) Y Putintseva	6	6
WC	(France) K Mladenovic	2	4
(Canada) S Dubois	6	6
WC	(France) V Larrière	3	3
Q	(Russia) V Dolonts	6	6
4	(United Kingdom) A Keothavong	2	0
8	(France) S Foretz Gacon	7^{12}	7
(Luxembourg) M Minella	6^{10}	5
JE	(Russia) I Khromacheva	2	2
WC	(France) C Garcia	6	6
(Poland) U Radwańska	6	6
(Croatia) M Lučić	4	4
(Hungary) M Czink	3	7^{7}	6
2	(Hungary) T Babos	6	6^{4}	2

Second round
5	(Russia) A Panova	3	2
Q	(Russia) Y Putintseva	6	6
(Canada) S Dubois	7^{8}	6
Q	(Russia) V Dolonts	6^{6}	4
8	(France) S Foretz Gacon	2	3
WC	(France) C Garcia	6	6
(Poland) U Radwańska	3	2
(Hungary) M Czink	6	6

Quarterfinals
Q	(Russia) Y Putintseva	6	7^{7}
(Canada) S Dubois	3	6^{4}
WC	(France) C Garcia	5	7^{10}	6
(Hungary) M Czink	7	6^{8}	4

Semifinals
Q	(Russia) Y Putintseva	4	6	6
WC	(France) C Garcia	6	3	2
