= 2019 Open de Cagnes-sur-Mer – Doubles =

Doubles
- 2019 Open de Cagnes-sur-Mer

Final
- Champions: (Russia) Anna Blinkova (Switzerland) Xenia Knoll
- Runners-up: (Brazil) Beatriz Haddad Maia (Brazil) Luisa Stefani
- Score: 4–6, 6–2, [14–12]

Events
Singles	Doubles
- Open de Cagnes-sur-Mer

Kaitlyn Christian and Sabrina Santamaria were the defending champions, but both players chose not to participate.

Anna Blinkova and Xenia Knoll won the title, defeating Beatriz Haddad Maia and Luisa Stefani in the final, 4–6, 6–2, [14–12].

== Seeds ==
1. (Russia) Anna Blinkova / (Switzerland) Xenia Knoll (champions)
2. (Sweden) Cornelia Lister / (Czech Republic) Renata Voráčová (semifinals)
3. (Japan) Miyu Kato / (Russia) Ekaterina Yashina (first round)
4. (Japan) Nao Hibino / (India) Prarthana Thombare (first round)

== Draw ==
Key

- Q = Qualifier
- WC = Wild card
- LL = Lucky loser
- Alt = Alternate
- ITF = ITF entry
- PR = Protected ranking
- SR = Special ranking
- SE = Special exempt
- JE = Junior exempt
- JR = Junior Accelerator Programme entrant
- CO = College Accelerator Programme entrant
- NG = Next Gen Accelerator Program entrant
- w/o = Walkover
- r = Retired
- d = Defaulted

=== Draw ===
First round
1	(Russia) A Blinkova (Switzerland) X Knoll	7^{7}	7^{7}
(France) M Arcangioli (France) S Reix	6^{2}	6^{3}
(Switzerland) Y In-Albon (Switzerland) C Perrin	6	6^{3}	[12]
(Israel) J Glushko (Australia) P Hon	3	7^{7}	[10]
3	(Japan) M Kato (Russia) E Yashina	1	6^{3}
(France) E Cascino (France) E Lechemia	6	7^{7}
(France) A Lim (France) H Tan	3	7^{7}	[10]
(Germany) T Korpatsch (Latvia) D Marcinkēviča	6	6^{5}	[7]
WC	(France) L Bencheikh (France) S Cakarevic	2	0
(Brazil) B Haddad Maia (Brazil) L Stefani	6	6
(Uzbekistan) A Amanmuradova (Georgia (country)) E Gorgodze	6	6
4	(Japan) N Hibino (India) P Thombare	3	1
WC	(Russia) A Anshba (United States) G Price	7	5	[10]
(France) T Andrianjafitrimo (France) M Georges	5	7	[7]
WC	(France) D Parry (France) M Yerolymos	4	4
2	(Sweden) C Lister (Czech Republic) R Voráčová	6	6

Quarterfinals
1	(Russia) A Blinkova (Switzerland) X Knoll	6	7
(Switzerland) Y In-Albon (Switzerland) C Perrin	2	5
(France) E Cascino (France) E Lechemia	6	6
(France) A Lim (France) H Tan	1	4
(Brazil) B Haddad Maia (Brazil) L Stefani	7^{7}	6
(Uzbekistan) A Amanmuradova (Georgia (country)) E Gorgodze	6^{2}	1
WC	(Russia) A Anshba (United States) G Price	1	0
2	(Sweden) C Lister (Czech Republic) R Voráčová	6	6

Semifinals
1	(Russia) A Blinkova (Switzerland) X Knoll	7^{7}	6
(France) E Cascino (France) E Lechemia	6^{2}	1
(Brazil) B Haddad Maia (Brazil) L Stefani	6	6
2	(Sweden) C Lister (Czech Republic) R Voráčová	2	2

Final
1	(Russia) A Blinkova (Switzerland) X Knoll	4	6	[14]
(Brazil) B Haddad Maia (Brazil) L Stefani	6	2	[12]
