= Tatiana Búa =

Argentine tennis player

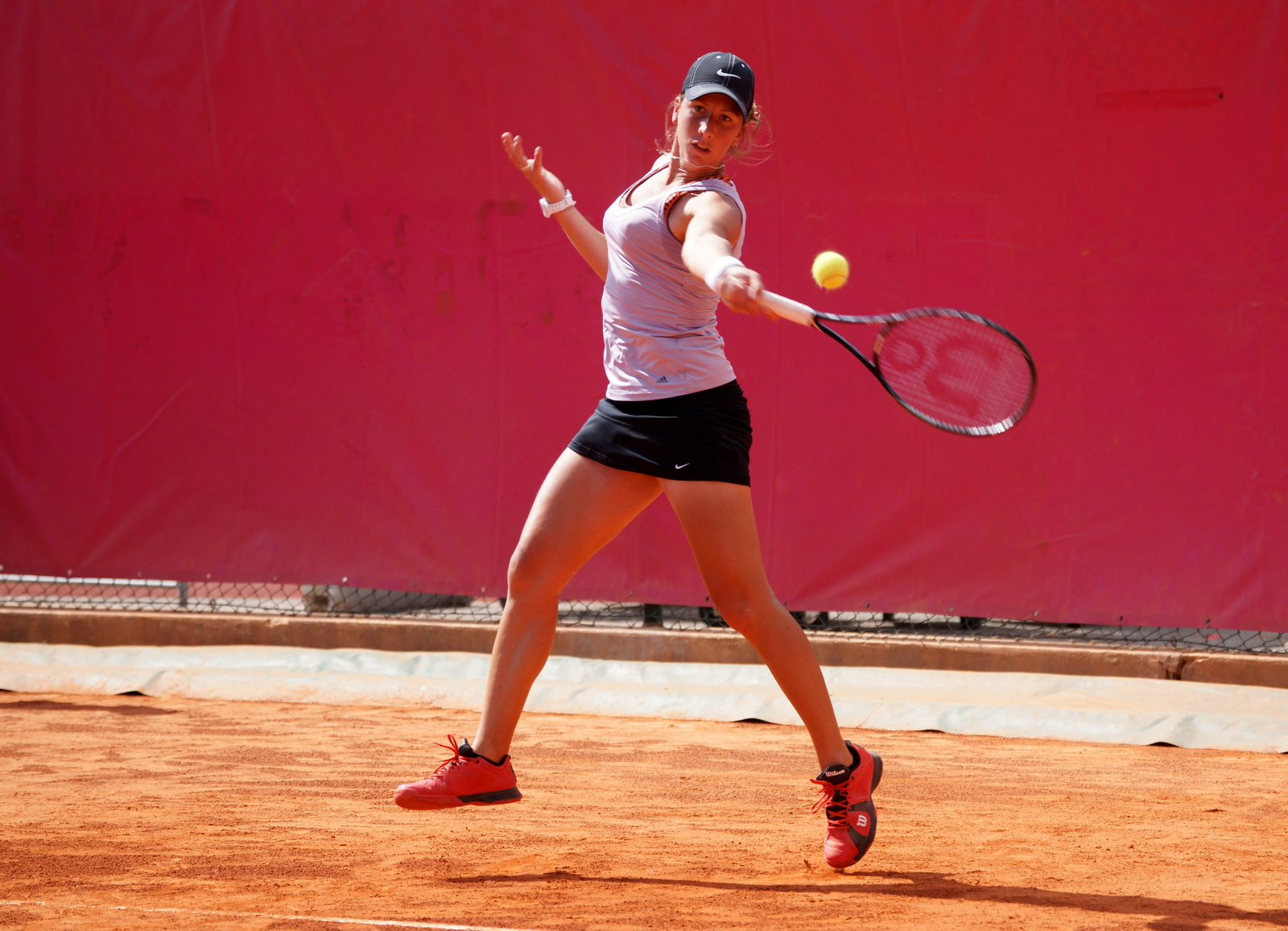
- Búa at the 2014 Open de Cagnes-sur-Mer
- Country (sports): Argentina
- Born: 19 January 1990 (age 36) Bragado, Argentina
- Plays: Left (two-handed backhand)
- Prize money: $99,168

Singles
- Career record: 274–171
- Career titles: 4 ITF
- Highest ranking: No. 372 (17 August 2009)

Grand Slam singles results
- French Open Junior: 1R (2007)
- Wimbledon Junior: 2R (2007)
- US Open Junior: 1R (2007)

Doubles
- Career record: 241–173
- Career titles: 24 ITF
- Highest ranking: No. 119 (7 July 2014)

Grand Slam doubles results
- French Open Junior: 1R (2007)
- Wimbledon Junior: 2R (2007)
- US Open Junior: 1R (2007)

Team competitions
- Fed Cup: 0–2

Tatiana Búa (Spanish pronunciation: [taˈtjana ˈβu.a]; (Note: In isolation, Búa is pronounced [ˈbu.a].) born 19 January 1990) is an Argentine former professional tennis player.

Búa has won four singles and 24 doubles titles on the ITF Circuit. She reached best WTA rankings of No. 372 in singles and 119 in doubles.

Búa was born in Bragado, and made her WTA Tour debut at the 2014 Morocco Open, partnering Daniela Seguel in women's doubles. The South American pair won their first-round match against Nicole Clerico and Nikola Fraňková, only to lose in the quarterfinals to the top seeds Darija Jurak and Megan Moulton-Levy. However, they reached their first final in Strasbourg the following month, losing to the three-time Grand Slam-finalist pairing of Ashleigh Barty and Casey Dellacqua.

Playing for Argentina Fed Cup team, Búa has a win–loss record of 0–2.

== WTA Tour finals ==
=== Doubles: 1 (runner-up) ===
Legend
Premier
International (0–1)

Date	Tournament	Surface	Partner	Opponents	Score
May 2014	Internationaux de Strasbourg, France	Clay	(Chile) Daniela Seguel	(Australia) Ashleigh Barty (Australia) Casey Dellacqua	6–4, 5–7, [4–10]

== ITF Circuit finals ==
=== Singles: 12 (4–8) ===
Legend $25,000 tournaments $10,000 tournaments	Finals by surface Hard (0–1) Clay (4–7)

Result	No.	Date	Tournament	Surface	Opponent	Score
Loss	1.	20 October 2007	ITF Serra Negra, Brazil	Clay	(Argentina) Mailen Auroux	0–6, 0–6
Loss	2.	3 November 2007	ITF Asunción, Paraguay	Clay	(Argentina) Verónica Spiegel	3–6, 6–3, 2–6
Win	1.	15 November 2008	ITF Santiago, Chile	Clay	(Argentina) Carla Beltrami	6–4, 6–2
Win	2.	14 November 2009	ITF Itajaí, Brazil	Clay	(Brazil) Ana Clara Duarte	6–1, 7–5
Loss	3.	20 November 2010	ITF Asunción, Paraguay	Clay	(Paraguay) Verónica Cepede Royg	2–6, 2–6
Win	3.	9 April 2011	ITF Córdoba, Argentina	Clay	(Austria) Tina Schiechtl	4–6, 6–3, 6–2
Loss	4.	27 August 2011	ITF Cochabamba, Bolivia	Clay	(Slovakia) Lenka Broošová	5–7, 7–6^{(7)}, 2–6
Loss	5.	14 July 2012	ITF Istanbul, Turkey	Hard	(Turkey) Başak Eraydın	7–5, 4–6, 1–6
Loss	6.	8 September 2012	ITF Trieste, Italy	Clay	(Croatia) Iva Mekovec	3–6, 2–6
Loss	7.	15 September 2012	ITF Lleida, Spain	Clay	(France) Marine Partaud	4–6, 4–6
Win	4.	21 September 2012	ITF Madrid, Spain	Clay (i)	(United Kingdom) Amanda Carreras	6–3, 7–5
Loss	8.	13 July 2013	ITF Getxo, Spain	Clay	(Italy) Gaia Sanesi	5–7, 7–5, 5–7

=== Doubles: 49 (24–25) ===
Legend $100,000 tournaments $50,000 tournaments $25,000 tournaments $15,000 tournaments $10,000 tournaments	Finals by surface Hard (6–2) Clay (18–23)

Result	No.	Date	Tournament	Surface	Partner	Opponents	Score
Loss	1.	9 October 2006	ITF Córdoba, Argentina	Clay	(Brazil) Roxane Vaisemberg	(Argentina) Agustina Lepore (Argentina) Verónica Spiegel	5–7, 4–6
Loss	2.	15 October 2007	ITF Serra Negra, Brazil	Clay	(Argentina) Mailen Auroux	(United States) Christina McHale (United States) Allie Will	5–7, 3–6
Win	1.	22 October 2007	ITF Itu, Brazil	Clay	(Argentina) Mailen Auroux	(Argentina) Lucía Jara Lozano (Peru) Claudia Razzeto	6–2, 5–7, [10–8]
Win	2.	28 April 2008	ITF Bell Ville, Argentina	Clay	(Colombia) Karen Castiblanco	(Brazil) Joana Cortez (Brazil) Natalia Guitler	6–4, 1–6, [10–7]
Win	3.	26 May 2008	ITF Braga, Portugal	Clay	(Argentina) Carla Beltrami	(Serbia) Bojana Borovnica (Spain) Lucía Sainz	6–2, 6–2
Loss	3.	2 June 2008	ITF Amarante, Portugal	Hard	(Colombia) Karen Castiblanco	(Canada) Mélanie Gloria (Spain) Lucía Sainz	6–7^{(3)}, 4–6
Win	4.	18 August 2008	ITF Bell Ville, Argentina	Clay	(Argentina) Carla Beltrami	(Argentina) Vanesa Furlanetto (Argentina) Aranza Salut	w/o
Win	5.	25 August 2008	ITF Buenos Aires, Argentina	Clay	(Brazil) Roxane Vaisemberg	(Uruguay) Estefanía Craciún (Argentina) Verónica Spiegel	4–6, 7–5, [10–3]
Loss	4.	24 November 2008	ITF Buenos Aires, Argentina	Clay	(Argentina) María Irigoyen	(Brazil) Fernanda Hermenegildo (Brazil) Teliana Pereira	3–6, 2–6
Loss	5.	16 March 2009	ITF Lima, Peru	Clay	(Argentina) Carla Beltrami	(Argentina) Lucía Jara Lozano (Argentina) María Emilia Salerni	6–7^{(3)}, 3–6
Loss	6.	1 June 2009	ITF Córdoba, Argentina	Clay	(Colombia) Karen Castiblanco	(Brazil) Raquel Piltcher (Brazil) Roxane Vaisemberg	4–6, 3–6
Win	6.	8 June 2009	ITF Santa Fe, Argentina	Clay	(Colombia) Karen Castiblanco	(Argentina) Luciana Sarmenti (Argentina) Emilia Yorio	4–6, 6–1, [10–6]
Win	7.	13 July 2009	ITF Cáceres, Spain	Hard	(Spain) Carmen López Rueda	(Spain) Inés Ferrer Suárez (Spain) Yera Campos Molina	6–3, 6–2
Loss	7.	31 August 2009	ITF Mollerussa, Spain	Hard	(Spain) Inés Ferrer Suárez	(Spain) Lara Arruabarrena (Spain) Carla Roset Franco	3–6, 6–2, [6–10]
Loss	8.	9 November 2009	ITF Itajaí, Brazil	Clay	(Colombia) Karen Castiblanco	(Brazil) Ana Clara Duarte (Brazil) Fernanda Hermenegildo	6–3, 2–6, [7–10]
Loss	9.	21 June 2010	ITF Buenos Aires, Argentina	Clay	(Colombia) Karen Castiblanco	(Argentina) Luciana Sarmenti (Argentina) Emilia Yorio	3–6, 7–6^{(2)}, [8–10]
Loss	10.	2 August 2010	ITF Santa Cruz, Bolivia	Clay	(Argentina) Luciana Sarmenti	(Colombia) Karen Castiblanco (Argentina) Estefanía Donnet	6–2, 0–6, [10–12]
Loss	11.	30 August 2010	ITF Santa Fe, Argentina	Clay	(Argentina) Aranza Salut	(Colombia) Karen Castiblanco (Chile) Camila Silva	6–4, 3–6, [6–10]
Win	8.	22 November 2010	ITF Asunción, Paraguay	Clay	(Argentina) Andrea Benítez	(Argentina) Lucía Jara Lozano (Argentina) Luciana Sarmenti	6–2, 6–4
Loss	12.	14 February 2011	ITF Buenos Aires, Argentina	Clay	(Argentina) Andrea Benítez	(Paraguay) Verónica Cepede Royg (Argentina) Luciana Sarmenti	7–5, 3–6, [7–10]
Win	9.	11 April 2011	ITF Córdoba, Argentina	Hard	(Argentina) Andrea Benítez	(Argentina) Catalina Pella (Argentina) Luciana Sarmenti	6–3, 6–4
Loss	13.	4 November 2011	ITF Asunción, Paraguay	Clay	(Argentina) Luciana Sarmenti	(Argentina) Mailen Auroux (Argentina) María Irigoyen	3–6, 6–4, [5–10]
Win	10.	18 May 2012	ITF Rosario, Argentina	Clay	(Chile) Camila Silva	(Argentina) Luciana Sarmenti (Chile) Daniela Seguel	6–4, 7–6^{(2)}
Win	11.	22 June 2012	ITF Madrid, Spain	Clay	(Argentina) Melina Ferrero	(Portugal) Margarida Moura (Spain) Olga Parres Azcoitia	6–4, 6–1
Win	12.	28 June 2012	ITF Melilla, Spain	Hard	(Argentina) Melina Ferrero	(Ecuador) Charlotte Römer (Spain) Mariona del Peral Francín	7–5, 6–2
Loss	14.	20 July 2012	ITF Knokke, Belgium	Clay	(Portugal) Margarida Moura	(Spain) Beatriz Morales Hernández (Australia) Alexandra Nancarrow	1–6, 6–4, [6–10]
Loss	15.	30 August 2012	ITF Bagnatica, Italy	Clay	(Italy) Claudia Giovine	(Italy) Anastasia Grymalska (Italy) Federica di Sarra	5–7, 2–6
Win	13.	13 September 2012	ITF Lleida, Spain	Clay	(Spain) Yvonne Cavallé Reimers	(Sweden) Cornelia Lister (Italy) Chiara Mendo	6–2, 6–3
Win	14.	20 September 2012	ITF Madrid, Spain	Clay (i)	(Spain) Lucía Cervera Vázquez	(Spain) Yvonne Cavallé Reimers (Spain) Isabel Rapisarda Calvo	3–6, 6–1, [10–7]
Loss	16.	27 September 2012	ITF Madrid, Spain	Clay	(Spain) Yvonne Cavallé Reimers	(Denmark) Malou Ejdesgaard (Bulgaria) Aleksandrina Naydenova	7–5, 3–6, [3–10]
Loss	17.	22 March 2013	ITF Madrid, Spain	Clay (i)	(Spain) Arabela Fernández Rabener	(Spain) Lucía Cervera Vázquez (Italy) Gaia Sanesi	5–7, 3–6
Win	15.	6 April 2013	ITF Torrent, Spain	Clay	(Venezuela) Andrea Gámiz	(Brazil) Yasmine Guimarães (Portugal) Rita Vilaça	6–1, 6–0
Win	16.	17 May 2013	ITF Monzón, Spain	Hard	(Spain) Lucía Cervera Vázquez	(Spain) Arabela Fernández Rabener (Russia) Yana Sizikova	4–6, 7–5, [10–6]
Win	17.	5 July 2013	ITF Denain, France	Clay	(Spain) Arabela Fernández Rabener	(Romania) Laura-Ioana Andrei (Bulgaria) Dia Evtimova	7–5, 6–2
Win	18.	16 August 2013	ITF Westende, Belgium	Hard	(Chile) Daniela Seguel	(Germany) Antonia Lottner (Latvia) Diāna Marcinkēviča	6–3, 5–7, [11–9]
Win	19.	23 August 2013	ITF Wanfercée-Baulet, Belgium	Clay	(Chile) Daniela Seguel	(France) Amandine Hesse (Israel) Deniz Khazaniuk	6–4, 6–2
Loss	18.	13 September 2013	ITF Lleida, Spain	Clay	(Spain) Lucía Cervera Vázquez	(Croatia) Adrijana Lekaj (Russia) Alena Tarasova	3–6, 4–6
Win	20.	11 October 2013	ITF Sant Cugat del Vallès, Spain	Clay	(Venezuela) Andrea Gámiz	(Spain) Lara Arruabarrena (United Kingdom) Amanda Carreras	4–6, 6–2, [10–7]
Win	21.	1 November 2013	ITF Benicarló, Spain	Clay	(Spain) Lucía Cervera Vázquez	(India) Sowjanya Bavisetti (China) Zhu Aiwen	6–3, 6–0
Win	22.	8 November 2013	ITF Vinaròs, Spain	Clay	(Spain) Lucía Cervera Vázquez	(India) Sowjanya Bavisetti (China) Zhu Aiwen	6–3, 6–2
Win	23.	15 March 2014	ITF Ponta Delgada, Portugal	Hard	(Spain) Olga Parres Azcoitia	(Czech Republic) Tereza Malíková (Czech Republic) Pernilla Mendesová	6–3, 6–4
Loss	19.	5 April 2014	ITF Pula, Italy	Clay	(Spain) Inés Ferrer Suárez	(Italy) Alice Balducci (Romania) Diana Buzean	6–3, 1–6, [1–10]
Loss	20.	11 May 2014	Open de Cagnes-sur-Mer, France	Clay	(Chile) Daniela Seguel	(Netherlands) Kiki Bertens (Sweden) Johanna Larsson	6–7^{(4)}, 4–6
Loss	21.	14 June 2014	Amstelveen Open, Netherlands	Clay	(Brazil) Beatriz Haddad Maia	(United States) Bernarda Pera (Bulgaria) Viktoriya Tomova	0–6, 1–2 ret.
Loss	22.	22 August 2014	ITF Wanfercée-Baulet, Belgium	Clay	(Chile) Daniela Seguel	(Belgium) Elise Mertens (Netherlands) Demi Schuurs	2–6, 3–6
Loss	23.	14 September 2014	Open de Saint-Malo, France	Clay	(Spain) Beatriz García Vidagany	(Italy) Giulia Gatto-Monticone (Italy) Anastasia Grymalska	3–6, 1–6
Loss	24.	2 October 2014	ITF La Vall d'Uixó, Spain	Clay	(Italy) Alice Savoretti	(Venezuela) Andrea Gámiz (Spain) Olga Parres Azcoitia	2–6, 3–6
Loss	25.	13 February 2015	ITF São Paulo, Brazil	Clay	(Brazil) Paula Cristina Gonçalves	(Montenegro) Danka Kovinić (Romania) Andreea Mitu	2–6, 5–7
Win	24.	6 June 2015	Open de Marseille, France	Clay	(France) Laura Thorpe	(United States) Nicole Melichar (Ukraine) Maryna Zanevska	6–3, 3–6, [10–6]
