= Open de Cagnes-sur-Mer =

- 2020 Open de Cagnes-sur-Mer

Defunct tennis tournament
- Event name: Cagnes-sur-Mer
- Location: Cagnes-sur-Mer, France
- Venue: US Cagnes-sur-Mer
- Category: ITF Women's Circuit
- Surface: Clay
- Draw: 32S/32Q/16D
- Prize money: $80,000
- Website: opendecagnes.com

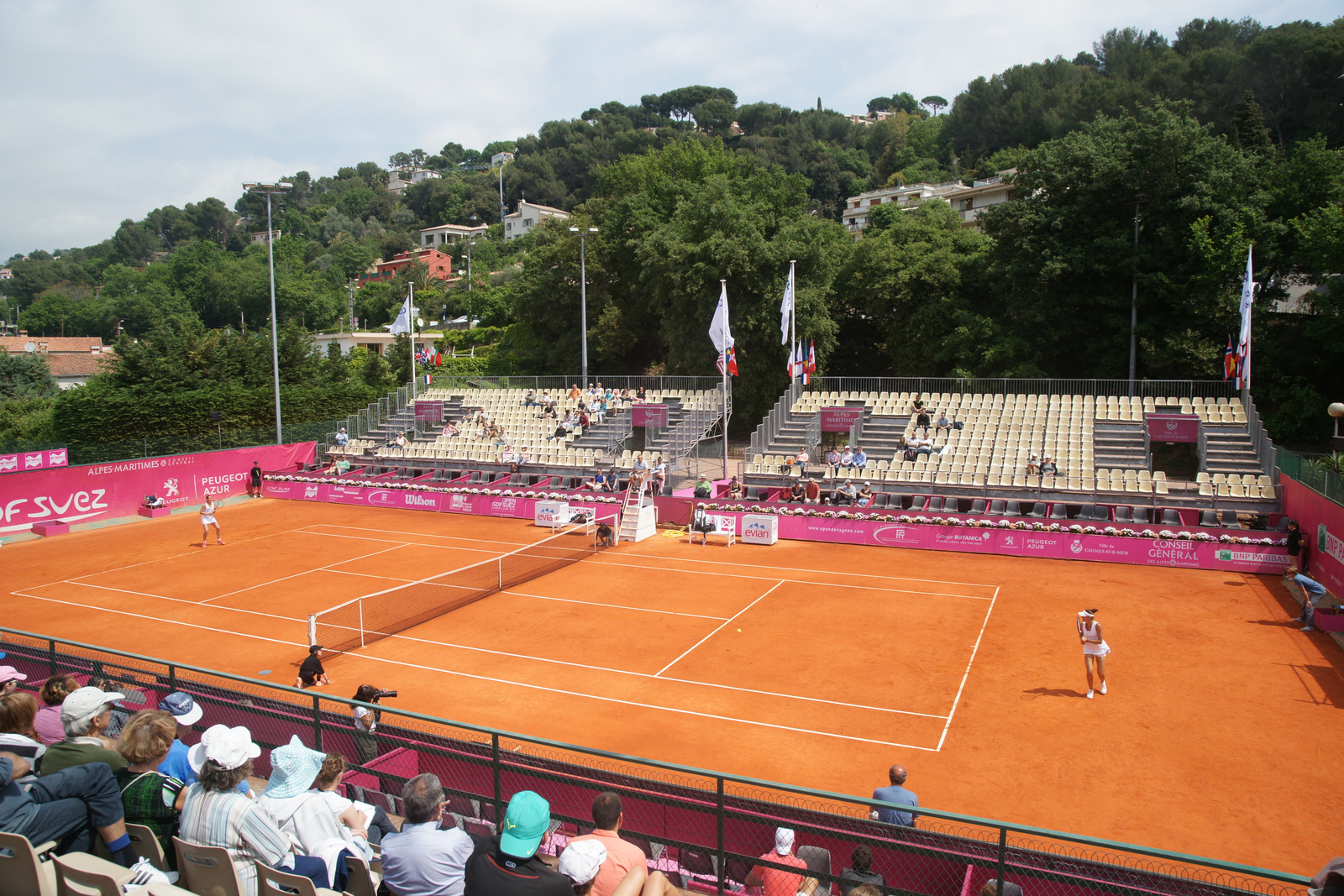
Centre court in Cagnes-sur-Mer

The Open de Cagnes-sur-Mer was a tennis tournament held in Cagnes-sur-Mer, France. Founded in 1998, this ITF Circuit event was a $80,000 tournament. It started off being a $10,000 event back in 1998 but has slowly increased the prize money and is played on outdoor clay courts. After many years as a $100,000 tournament, it was downgraded in 2019 to a $80,000 category event. In 2020 the tournament was discontinued

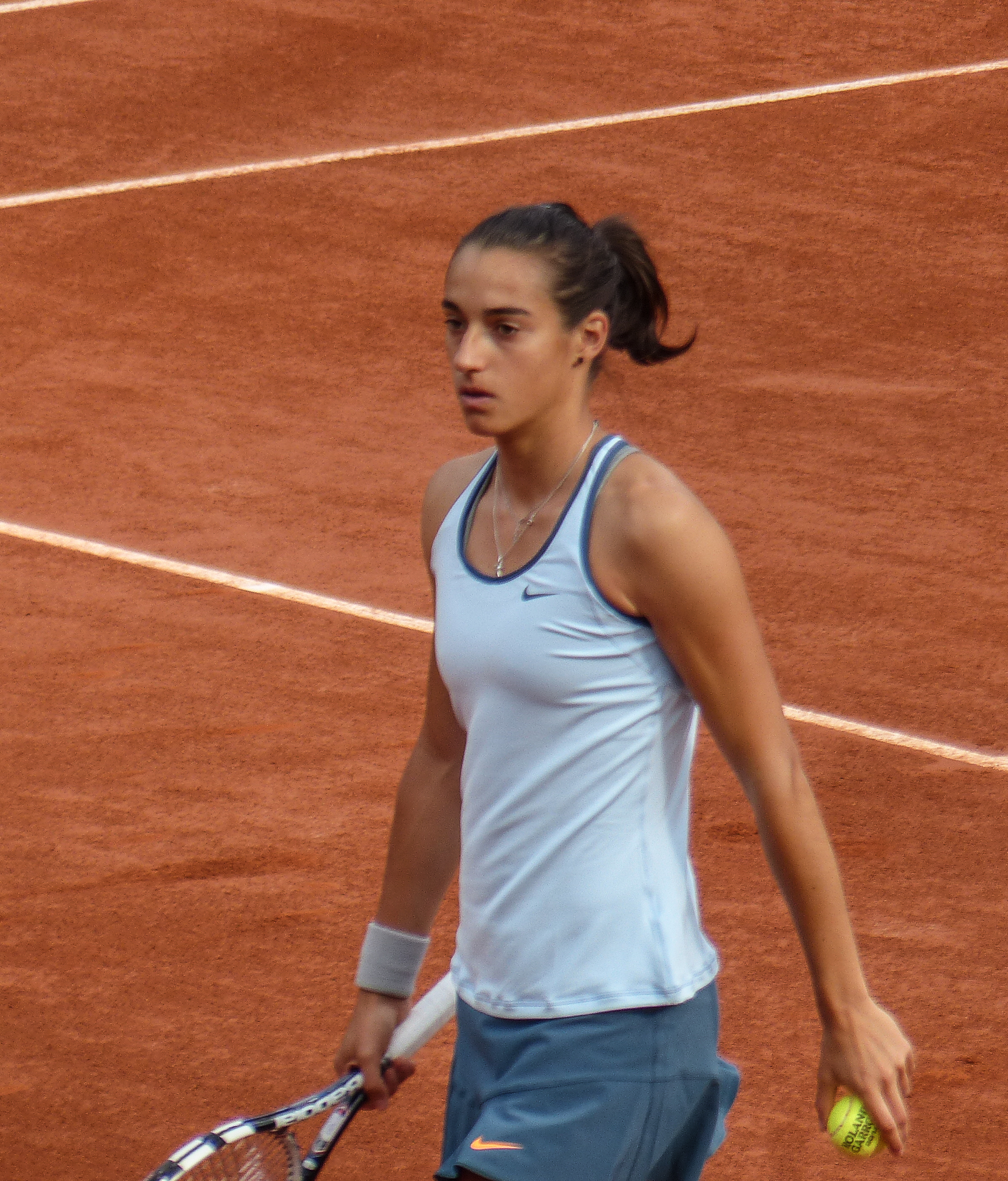
Caroline Garcia won the title in 2013

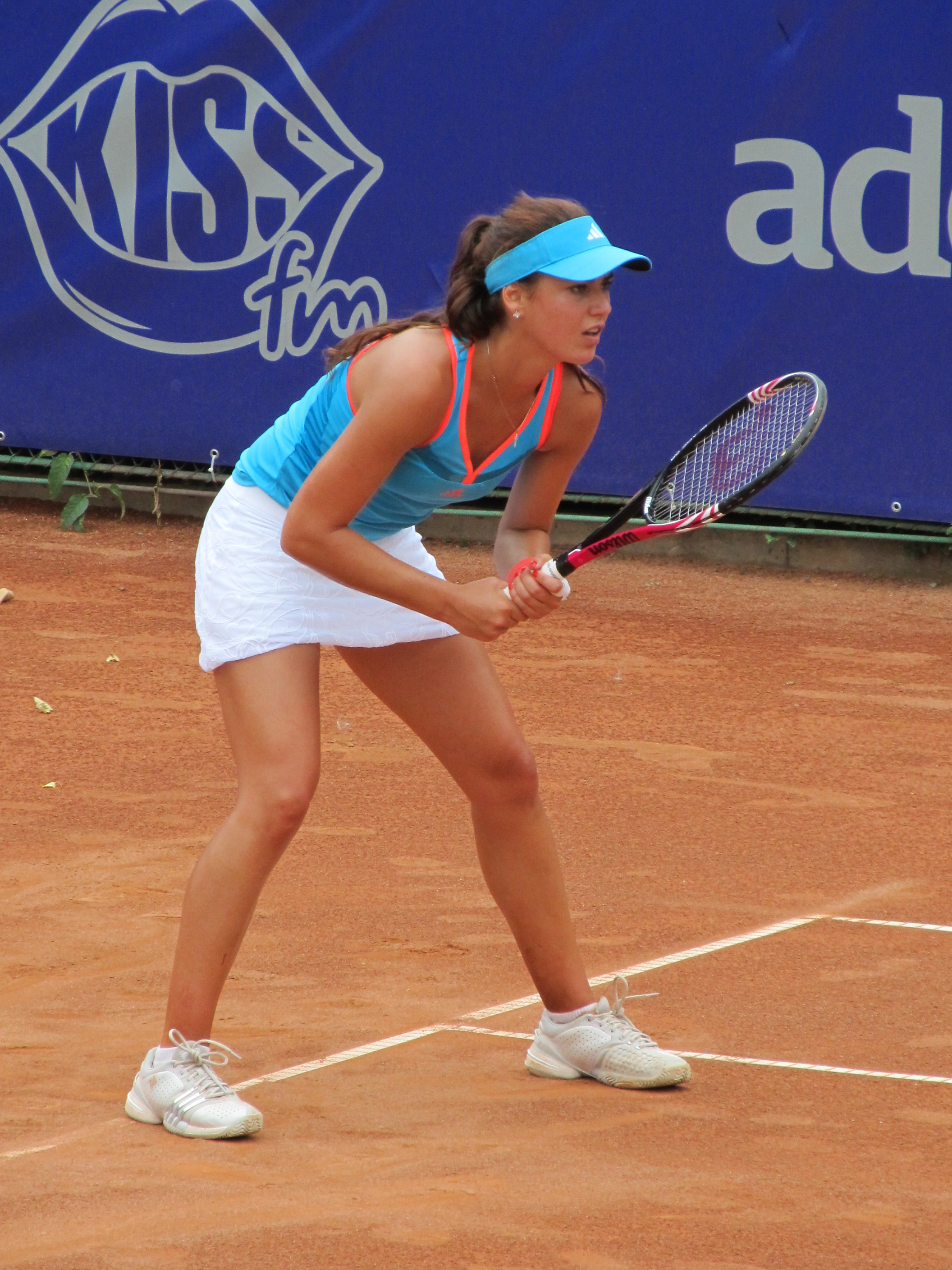
Former Romanian No. 1, Sorana Cîrstea, won the title in 2011

== Past finals ==
=== Singles ===
Year	Champion	Runner-up	Score
2020	(Spain) Sara Sorribes Tormo	(Romania) Irina Bara	6–3, 6–4
2019	(United States) Christina McHale	(Switzerland) Stefanie Vögele	7–6^{(7–4)}, 6–2
2018	(Sweden) Rebecca Peterson	(Ukraine) Dayana Yastremska	6–4, 7–5
2017	(Brazil) Beatriz Haddad Maia	(Switzerland) Jil Teichmann	6–3, 6–3
2016	(Poland) Magda Linette	(Germany) Carina Witthöft	6–3, 7–5
2015	(Germany) Carina Witthöft	(Germany) Tatjana Maria	7–5, 6–1
2014	(Canada) Sharon Fichman	(Switzerland) Timea Bacsinszky	6–2, 6–2
2013	(France) Caroline Garcia	(Ukraine) Maryna Zanevska	6–0, 4–6, 6–3
2012	(Russia) Yulia Putintseva	(Austria) Patricia Mayr-Achleitner	6–2, 6–1
2011	(Romania) Sorana Cîrstea	(France) Pauline Parmentier	6–7^{(5–7)}, 6–2, 6–2
2010	(Estonia) Kaia Kanepi	(Slovenia) Maša Zec Peškirič	6–3, 6–2
2009	(Italy) Maria Elena Camerin	(Czech Republic) Zuzana Ondrášková	6–1, 6–2
2008	(Ukraine) Viktoriya Kutuzova	(Estonia) Maret Ani	6–1, 7–5
2007	(Switzerland) Timea Bacsinszky	(Germany) Tatjana Malek	6–4, 6–1
2006	(Germany) Martina Müller	(Belarus) Anastasiya Yakimova	7–6^{(8–6)}, 2–6, 6–0
2005	(Spain) Laura Pous Tió	(Russia) Ekaterina Bychkova	7–6^{(7–4)}, 6–4
2004	(France) Séverine Brémond Beltrame	(Germany) Anna-Lena Grönefeld	6–4, 6–4
2003	(France) Stéphanie Cohen-Aloro	(Ukraine) Yulia Beygelzimer	6–4, 6–3
2002	(France) Émilie Loit	(Czech Republic) Alena Vašková	7–5, 3–6, 6–4
2001	(Czech Republic) Jana Hlaváčková	(Germany) Sabine Klaschka	7–5, 6–4
2000	(Uzbekistan) Iroda Tulyaganova	(Italy) Giulia Casoni	6–2, 6–3
1999	(United Kingdom) Lucy Ahl	(France) Virginie Razzano	4–6, 7–5, 6–2
1998	(Belgium) Nancy Feber	(France) Carine Bornu	6–0, 6–1

=== Doubles ===
Year	Champion	Runners-up	Score
2020	(United Kingdom) Samantha Murray Sharan (Germany) Julia Wachaczyk	(Poland) Paula Kania (Poland) Katarzyna Piter	7–5, 6–2
2019	(Russia) Anna Blinkova (Switzerland) Xenia Knoll	(Brazil) Beatriz Haddad Maia (Brazil) Luisa Stefani	4–6, 6–2, [14–12]
2018	(United States) Kaitlyn Christian (United States) Sabrina Santamaria	(Belarus) Vera Lapko (Kazakhstan) Galina Voskoboeva	2–6, 7–5, [10–7]
2017	(Chinese Taipei) Chang Kai-chen (Chinese Taipei) Hsieh Su-wei	(Romania) Raluca Olaru (Czech Republic) Renata Voráčová	7–5, 6–1
2016	(Romania) Andreea Mitu (Netherlands) Demi Schuurs	(Switzerland) Xenia Knoll (Serbia) Aleksandra Krunić	6–4, 7–5
2015	(United Kingdom) Johanna Konta (France) Laura Thorpe	(United Kingdom) Jocelyn Rae (United Kingdom) Anna Smith	1–6, 6–4, [10–5]
2014	(Netherlands) Kiki Bertens (Sweden) Johanna Larsson	(Argentina) Tatiana Búa (Chile) Daniela Seguel	7–6^{(7–4)}, 6–4
2013	(United States) Vania King (Netherlands) Arantxa Rus	(Colombia) Catalina Castaño (Brazil) Teliana Pereira	4–6, 7–5, [10–8]
2012	(Russia) Alexandra Panova (Poland) Urszula Radwańska	(Hungary) Katalin Marosi (Czech Republic) Renata Voráčová	7–5, 4–6, [10–6]
2011	(Germany) Anna-Lena Grönefeld (Croatia) Petra Martić	(Croatia) Darija Jurak (Czech Republic) Renata Voráčová	1–6, 6–2, [11–9]
2010	(Bosnia and Herzegovina) Mervana Jugić-Salkić (Croatia) Darija Jurak	(France) Stéphanie Cohen-Aloro (France) Kristina Mladenovic	0–6, 6–2, [10–5]
2009	(France) Julie Coin (Canada) Marie-Ève Pelletier	(Argentina) Erica Krauth (Georgia (country)) Anna Tatishvili	6–4, 6–3
2008	(Romania) Monica Niculescu (Czech Republic) Renata Voráčová	(France) Julie Coin (Canada) Marie-Ève Pelletier	6–7^{(2–7)}, 6–1, [10–5]
2007	(Switzerland) Timea Bacsinszky (France) Aurélie Védy	(Slovakia) Katarína Kachlíková (Russia) Anastasia Pavlyuchenkova	7–5, 7–5
2006	(France) Sophie Lefèvre (France) Aurélie Védy	(Austria) Daniela Klemenschits (Austria) Sandra Klemenschits	2–6, 6–4, 7–6^{(7–1)}
2005	(Ukraine) Yuliya Beygelzimer (Germany) Sandra Klösel	(France) Caroline Dhenin (Romania) Andreea Vanc	6–3, 3–6, 6–1
2004	(Bulgaria) Lubomira Bacheva (Czech Republic) Eva Birnerová	(Romania) Ruxandra Dragomir-Ilie (Germany) Antonia Matic	4–6, 7–6^{(7–4)}, 6–3
2003	(Russia) Vera Douchevina (Russia) Galina Voskoboeva	(Ukraine) Yuliya Beygelzimer (Ukraine) Anna Zaporozhanova	6–3, 6–4
2002	(France) Stéphanie Cohen-Aloro (Madagascar) Dally Randriantefy	(Czech Republic) Iveta Benešová (France) Caroline Dhenin	6–2, 6–4
2001	(France) Carine Bornu (France) Caroline Dhenin	(France) Sophie Georges (France) Capucine Rousseau	6–4, 6–3
2000	(Germany) Angelika Bachmann (Italy) Giulia Casoni	(Uzbekistan) Iroda Tulyaganova (Ukraine) Anna Zaporozhanova	7–5, 6–1
1999	(United Kingdom) Karen Cross (Australia) Amanda Grahame	(Australia) Louise Pleming (France) Catherine Tanvier	6–4, 3–6, 7–6
1998	(United Kingdom) Helen Crook (United Kingdom) Victoria Davies	(Netherlands) Yvette Basting (Czech Republic) Magdalena Zděnovcová	6–3, 6–3
