= 2016 ITF Women's Circuit (January–March) =

Tennis tour

The 2016 ITF Women's Circuit is the 2016 edition of the second-tier tour for women's professional tennis. It is organised by the International Tennis Federation and is a tier below the WTA Tour. The ITF Women's Circuit includes tournaments with prize money ranging from $10,000 up to $100,000.

== Key ==
Category
$100,000 tournaments
$75,000 tournaments
$50,000 tournaments
$25,000 tournaments
$10,000 tournaments

== Month ==
=== January ===
Week of	Tournament	Winner	Runners-up	Semifinalists	Quarterfinalists
January 4	ITF Women's Circuit – Hong Kong; Victoria Park, Hong Kong; Hard $25,000; Singles and doubles draws	(Switzerland) Viktorija Golubic; 6–3, 6–3	(Japan) Risa Ozaki	(Czech Republic) Kristýna Plíšková (Thailand) Luksika Kumkhum	(China) Liu Fangzhou (Japan) Mizuno Kijima (South Korea) Jang Su-jeong (Japan) Miyabi Inoue
January 4	ITF Women's Circuit – Hong Kong; Victoria Park, Hong Kong; Hard $25,000; Singles and doubles draws	(Switzerland) Viktorija Golubic (Liechtenstein) Stephanie Vogt; 6–2, 1–6, [10–4]	(Chinese Taipei) Hsu Ching-wen (Finland) Emma Laine	(Czech Republic) Kristýna Plíšková (Thailand) Luksika Kumkhum	(China) Liu Fangzhou (Japan) Mizuno Kijima (South Korea) Jang Su-jeong (Japan) Miyabi Inoue
January 4	Antalya, Turkey; Clay $10,000; Singles and doubles draws	(United Kingdom) Tara Moore; 2–6, 7–5, 6–0	(Germany) Anne Schäfer	(Slovenia) Nastja Kolar (Georgia (country)) Sofia Kvatsabaia	(Austria) Julia Grabher (Slovenia) Pia Čuk (Georgia (country)) Ekaterine Gorgodze (Belgium) Victoria Smirnova
January 4	Antalya, Turkey; Clay $10,000; Singles and doubles draws	(Slovenia) Nastja Kolar (Bosnia and Herzegovina) Jasmina Tinjić; 7–6^{(7–5)}, 3–6, [10–6]	(Austria) Julia Grabher (Czech Republic) Anna Slováková	(Slovenia) Nastja Kolar (Georgia (country)) Sofia Kvatsabaia	(Austria) Julia Grabher (Slovenia) Pia Čuk (Georgia (country)) Ekaterine Gorgodze (Belgium) Victoria Smirnova
January 11	Aurangabad, India; Clay $25,000; Singles and doubles draws	(Slovenia) Tadeja Majerič; 6–4, 6–3	(Ukraine) Valeriya Strakhova	(Russia) Ekaterina Yashina (India) Pranjala Yadlapalli	(Chinese Taipei) Hsu Ching-wen (India) Prerna Bhambri (France) Lou Brouleau (India) Ankita Raina
January 11	Aurangabad, India; Clay $25,000; Singles and doubles draws	(Russia) Margarita Lazareva (Ukraine) Valeriya Strakhova; 6–1, 7–6^{(7–2)}	(Turkey) Melis Sezer (Russia) Ekaterina Yashina	(Russia) Ekaterina Yashina (India) Pranjala Yadlapalli	(Chinese Taipei) Hsu Ching-wen (India) Prerna Bhambri (France) Lou Brouleau (India) Ankita Raina
January 11	Daytona Beach, United States; Clay $25,000; Singles and doubles draws	(Tunisia) Ons Jabeur; 0–6, 6–2, 6–4	(Ukraine) Olga Fridman	(United States) Asia Muhammad (United States) Grace Min	(Bulgaria) Elitsa Kostova (Ukraine) Elizaveta Ianchuk (Russia) Natalia Vikhlyantseva (United States) CiCi Bellis
January 11	Daytona Beach, United States; Clay $25,000; Singles and doubles draws	(Russia) Natela Dzalamidze (Russia) Veronika Kudermetova; 6–4, 6–3	(Canada) Sharon Fichman (Canada) Carol Zhao	(United States) Asia Muhammad (United States) Grace Min	(Bulgaria) Elitsa Kostova (Ukraine) Elizaveta Ianchuk (Russia) Natalia Vikhlyantseva (United States) CiCi Bellis
January 11	Cairo, Egypt; Clay $10,000; Singles and doubles draws	(Slovakia) Chantal Škamlová; 6–1, 4–6, 7–6^{(7–3)}	(Egypt) Sandra Samir	(Greece) Despina Papamichail (Russia) Nika Kukharchuk	(France) Margot Yerolymos (India) Eetee Maheta (Czech Republic) Petra Krejsová (Serbia) Tamara Čurović
January 11	Cairo, Egypt; Clay $10,000; Singles and doubles draws	(Czech Republic) Petra Krejsová (Slovakia) Chantal Škamlová; 6–4, 6–0	(Egypt) Ola Abou Zekry (Greece) Despina Papamichail	(Greece) Despina Papamichail (Russia) Nika Kukharchuk	(France) Margot Yerolymos (India) Eetee Maheta (Czech Republic) Petra Krejsová (Serbia) Tamara Čurović
January 11	Fort-de-France, Martinique, France; Hard $10,000; Singles and doubles draws	(France) Irina Ramialison; 7–6^{(7–3)}, 6–2	(Czech Republic) Marie Bouzková	(France) Brandy Mina (Romania) Jaqueline Cristian	(Netherlands) Kelly Versteeg (Italy) Giulia Pairone (Hungary) Csilla Argyelán (France) Clothilde de Bernardi
January 11	Fort-de-France, Martinique, France; Hard $10,000; Singles and doubles draws	(Romania) Jaqueline Cristian (Italy) Gaia Sanesi; 7–6^{(7–5)}, 7–6^{(7–5)}	(United States) Emina Bektas (United States) Zoë Gwen Scandalis	(France) Brandy Mina (Romania) Jaqueline Cristian	(Netherlands) Kelly Versteeg (Italy) Giulia Pairone (Hungary) Csilla Argyelán (France) Clothilde de Bernardi
January 11	Stuttgart, Germany; Hard (indoor) $10,000; Singles and doubles draws	(Russia) Anna Blinkova; 7–6^{(7–4)}, 2–6, 6–2	(Greece) Valentini Grammatikopoulou	(Russia) Maria Marfutina (Belgium) Greet Minnen	(Germany) Katharina Hobgarski (Germany) Anna Zaja (Croatia) Tena Lukas (Czech Republic) Kateřina Vaňková
January 11	Stuttgart, Germany; Hard (indoor) $10,000; Singles and doubles draws	(Russia) Anna Blinkova (Russia) Maria Marfutina; 0–6, 6–4, [10–8]	(Germany) Laura Schaeder (Germany) Anna Zaja	(Russia) Maria Marfutina (Belgium) Greet Minnen	(Germany) Katharina Hobgarski (Germany) Anna Zaja (Croatia) Tena Lukas (Czech Republic) Kateřina Vaňková
January 11	Hammamet, Tunisia; Clay $10,000; Singles and doubles draws	(Italy) Angelica Moratelli; 6–3, 6–3	(Switzerland) Karin Kennel	(France) Jessika Ponchet (Italy) Corinna Dentoni	(Bulgaria) Dia Evtimova (Romania) Cristina Ene (Serbia) Milana Spremo (Romania) Michele Zmău
January 11	Hammamet, Tunisia; Clay $10,000; Singles and doubles draws	(Italy) Corinna Dentoni (Belarus) Ilona Kremen; 7–6^{(7–2)}, 5–7, [10–5]	(Canada) Petra Januskova (Italy) Angelica Moratelli	(France) Jessika Ponchet (Italy) Corinna Dentoni	(Bulgaria) Dia Evtimova (Romania) Cristina Ene (Serbia) Milana Spremo (Romania) Michele Zmău
January 11	Antalya, Turkey; Clay $10,000; Singles and doubles draws	(Georgia (country)) Ekaterine Gorgodze; 6–4, 6–0	(Bulgaria) Viktoriya Tomova	(Hungary) Anna Bondár (Austria) Julia Grabher	(United Kingdom) Tara Moore (Slovenia) Nastja Kolar (Germany) Yana Morderger (Slovenia) Pia Čuk
January 11	Antalya, Turkey; Clay $10,000; Singles and doubles draws	(Hungary) Ágnes Bukta (Austria) Julia Grabher; 1–6, 6–4, [11–9]	(Georgia (country)) Ekaterine Gorgodze (Georgia (country)) Sofia Kvatsabaia	(Hungary) Anna Bondár (Austria) Julia Grabher	(United Kingdom) Tara Moore (Slovenia) Nastja Kolar (Germany) Yana Morderger (Slovenia) Pia Čuk
January 18	Guarujá, Brazil; Hard $25,000; Singles and doubles draws	(Paraguay) Montserrat González; 1–6, 7–6^{(7–5)}, 6–2	(Romania) Sorana Cîrstea	(Netherlands) Indy de Vroome (Brazil) Beatriz Haddad Maia	(Romania) Cristina Dinu (Czech Republic) Karolína Muchová (Argentina) Nadia Podoroska (Switzerland) Jil Teichmann
January 18	Guarujá, Brazil; Hard $25,000; Singles and doubles draws	(Brazil) Paula Cristina Gonçalves (Brazil) Beatriz Haddad Maia; 6–7^{(3–7)}, 7–5, [10–7]	(Brazil) Laura Pigossi (Switzerland) Jil Teichmann	(Netherlands) Indy de Vroome (Brazil) Beatriz Haddad Maia	(Romania) Cristina Dinu (Czech Republic) Karolína Muchová (Argentina) Nadia Podoroska (Switzerland) Jil Teichmann
January 18	Wesley Chapel, United States; Clay $25,000; Singles and doubles draws	(United States) Sofia Kenin; 6–2, 6–2	(Czech Republic) Jesika Malečková	(United States) Shelby Rogers (United States) Katerina Stewart	(Czech Republic) Nicole Vaidišová (United States) Kayla Day (United States) Kristie Ahn (Romania) Alexandra Cadanțu
January 18	Wesley Chapel, United States; Clay $25,000; Singles and doubles draws	(United States) Ingrid Neel (Russia) Natalia Vikhlyantseva; 4–6, 7–6^{(7–4)}, [10–6]	(Russia) Natela Dzalamidze (Russia) Veronika Kudermetova	(United States) Shelby Rogers (United States) Katerina Stewart	(Czech Republic) Nicole Vaidišová (United States) Kayla Day (United States) Kristie Ahn (Romania) Alexandra Cadanțu
January 18	Cairo, Egypt; Clay $10,000; Singles and doubles draws	(Slovakia) Chantal Škamlová; 6–4, 6–1	(Egypt) Sandra Samir	(Switzerland) Jessica Crivelletto (Greece) Despina Papamichail	(Egypt) Dalila Said (Egypt) Lamis Alhussein Abdel Aziz (South Africa) Ilze Hattingh (Russia) Nika Kukharchuk
January 18	Cairo, Egypt; Clay $10,000; Singles and doubles draws	(Czech Republic) Petra Krejsová (Slovakia) Chantal Škamlová; 6–3, 6–2	(India) Riya Bhatia (India) Eetee Maheta	(Switzerland) Jessica Crivelletto (Greece) Despina Papamichail	(Egypt) Dalila Said (Egypt) Lamis Alhussein Abdel Aziz (South Africa) Ilze Hattingh (Russia) Nika Kukharchuk
January 18	Petit-Bourg, Guadeloupe, France; Hard $10,000; Singles and doubles draws	(Czech Republic) Marie Bouzková; 6–4, 6–1	(France) Théo Gravouil	(United States) Alexandra Morozova (France) Priscilla Heise	(France) Irina Ramialison (France) Victoria Muntean (Hungary) Lilla Barzó (Republic of Ireland) Jenny Claffey
January 18	Petit-Bourg, Guadeloupe, France; Hard $10,000; Singles and doubles draws	(Netherlands) Rosalie van der Hoek (Netherlands) Kelly Versteeg; 7–6^{(7–5)}, 6–1	(Romania) Jaqueline Cristian (Italy) Gaia Sanesi	(United States) Alexandra Morozova (France) Priscilla Heise	(France) Irina Ramialison (France) Victoria Muntean (Hungary) Lilla Barzó (Republic of Ireland) Jenny Claffey
January 18	Astana, Kazakhstan; Hard (indoor) $10,000; Singles and doubles draws	(Russia) Olga Doroshina; 6–2, 6–4	(Russia) Alina Silich	(Kazakhstan) Kamila Kerimbayeva (Russia) Aleksandra Pospelova	(Russia) Sofia Salimova (Russia) Tamara Bizhukova (Russia) Anastasia Gasanova (Russia) Polina Novikova
January 18	Astana, Kazakhstan; Hard (indoor) $10,000; Singles and doubles draws	(Russia) Olga Doroshina (Russia) Yana Sizikova; 6–4, 6–0	(Kazakhstan) Alexandra Grinchishina (Netherlands) Erika Vogelsang	(Kazakhstan) Kamila Kerimbayeva (Russia) Aleksandra Pospelova	(Russia) Sofia Salimova (Russia) Tamara Bizhukova (Russia) Anastasia Gasanova (Russia) Polina Novikova
January 18	Hammamet, Tunisia; Clay $10,000; Singles and doubles draws	(Italy) Anastasia Grymalska; 3–6, 6–2, 6–3	(France) Victoria Larrière	(Italy) Angelica Moratelli (Italy) Corinna Dentoni	(Serbia) Milana Spremo (Romania) Cristina Ene (Italy) Federica Joe Gardella (Greece) Eleni Kordolaimi
January 18	Hammamet, Tunisia; Clay $10,000; Singles and doubles draws	(Italy) Anastasia Grymalska (Belarus) Ilona Kremen; 7–6^{(7–5)}, 6–1	(Canada) Petra Januskova (Italy) Angelica Moratelli	(Italy) Angelica Moratelli (Italy) Corinna Dentoni	(Serbia) Milana Spremo (Romania) Cristina Ene (Italy) Federica Joe Gardella (Greece) Eleni Kordolaimi
January 18	Antalya, Turkey; Clay $10,000; Singles and doubles draws	(North Macedonia) Lina Gjorcheska; 1–6, 6–3, 6–2	(Georgia (country)) Ekaterine Gorgodze	(Georgia (country)) Sofia Kvatsabaia (Hungary) Anna Bondár	(Croatia) Mariana Dražić (Bulgaria) Viktoriya Tomova (Armenia) Ani Amiraghyan (Romania) Ioana Loredana Roșca
January 18	Antalya, Turkey; Clay $10,000; Singles and doubles draws	(North Macedonia) Lina Gjorcheska (Romania) Ioana Loredana Roșca; 6–2, 6–2	(Belgium) Steffi Distelmans (Switzerland) Chiara Grimm	(Georgia (country)) Sofia Kvatsabaia (Hungary) Anna Bondár	(Croatia) Mariana Dražić (Bulgaria) Viktoriya Tomova (Armenia) Ani Amiraghyan (Romania) Ioana Loredana Roșca
January 25	Engie Open Métropole 42; Andrézieux-Bouthéon, France; Hard (indoor) $50,000; Singles – Doubles	(Switzerland) Stefanie Vögele; 6–1, 6–2	(Belgium) An-Sophie Mestach	(Russia) Anna Blinkova (France) Océane Dodin	(France) Amandine Hesse (Croatia) Petra Martić (Czech Republic) Tereza Smitková (Switzerland) Viktorija Golubic
January 25	Engie Open Métropole 42; Andrézieux-Bouthéon, France; Hard (indoor) $50,000; Singles – Doubles	(Belgium) Elise Mertens (Belgium) An-Sophie Mestach; 6–4, 3–6, [10–7]	(Switzerland) Viktorija Golubic (Switzerland) Xenia Knoll	(Russia) Anna Blinkova (France) Océane Dodin	(France) Amandine Hesse (Croatia) Petra Martić (Czech Republic) Tereza Smitková (Switzerland) Viktorija Golubic
January 25	Tennis Championships of Maui; Maui, United States; Hard $50,000; Singles – Doubles	(United States) Christina McHale; 6–3, 4–6, 6–4	(United States) Raveena Kingsley	(United Kingdom) Naomi Broady (United States) Jessica Pegula	(Poland) Paula Kania (United States) Jacqueline Cako (United States) Maria Sanchez (United States) Samantha Crawford
January 25	Tennis Championships of Maui; Maui, United States; Hard $50,000; Singles – Doubles	(United States) Asia Muhammad (United States) Maria Sanchez; 6–2, 3–6, [10–6]	(United States) Jessica Pegula (United States) Taylor Townsend	(United Kingdom) Naomi Broady (United States) Jessica Pegula	(Poland) Paula Kania (United States) Jacqueline Cako (United States) Maria Sanchez (United States) Samantha Crawford
January 25	Bertioga, Brazil; Hard $25,000; Singles and doubles draws	(Romania) Sorana Cîrstea; 6–1, 6–7^{(4–7)}, 6–3	(Argentina) Catalina Pella	(Brazil) Beatriz Haddad Maia (Slovakia) Rebecca Šramková	(Slovenia) Nastja Kolar (Argentina) Nadia Podoroska (Switzerland) Jil Teichmann (Brazil) Laura Pigossi
January 25	Bertioga, Brazil; Hard $25,000; Singles and doubles draws	(Romania) Cristina Dinu (Netherlands) Indy de Vroome; 6–3, 6–3	(Poland) Katarzyna Kawa (Poland) Sandra Zaniewska	(Brazil) Beatriz Haddad Maia (Slovakia) Rebecca Šramková	(Slovenia) Nastja Kolar (Argentina) Nadia Podoroska (Switzerland) Jil Teichmann (Brazil) Laura Pigossi
January 25	Sunrise, United States; Clay $25,000; Singles and doubles draws	(Tunisia) Ons Jabeur; 3–6, 6–2, 6–1	(United States) Anna Tatishvili	(Ukraine) Elizaveta Ianchuk (United States) Ellie Halbauer	(Czech Republic) Jesika Malečková (Romania) Elena Gabriela Ruse (Bulgaria) Elitsa Kostova (Canada) Françoise Abanda
January 25	Sunrise, United States; Clay $25,000; Singles and doubles draws	(Czech Republic) Lenka Kunčíková (Czech Republic) Karolína Stuchlá; 6–1, 7–6^{(8–6)}	(Czech Republic) Kateřina Kramperová (Czech Republic) Jesika Malečková	(Ukraine) Elizaveta Ianchuk (United States) Ellie Halbauer	(Czech Republic) Jesika Malečková (Romania) Elena Gabriela Ruse (Bulgaria) Elitsa Kostova (Canada) Françoise Abanda
January 25	Cairo, Egypt; Clay $10,000; Singles and doubles draws	(Kazakhstan) Kamila Kerimbayeva; 6–4, 4–6, 6–1	(Slovakia) Chantal Škamlová	(Czech Republic) Petra Krejsová (Serbia) Bojana Marinković	(Greece) Despina Papamichail (Egypt) Dalila Said (Egypt) Sandra Samir (Poland) Wiktoria Kulik
January 25	Cairo, Egypt; Clay $10,000; Singles and doubles draws	(Czech Republic) Petra Krejsová (Slovakia) Chantal Škamlová; 7–6^{(7–2)}, 6–3	(Egypt) Ola Abou Zekry (Greece) Despina Papamichail	(Czech Republic) Petra Krejsová (Serbia) Bojana Marinković	(Greece) Despina Papamichail (Egypt) Dalila Said (Egypt) Sandra Samir (Poland) Wiktoria Kulik
January 25	Saint Martin, France; Hard $10,000; Singles and doubles draws	(France) Irina Ramialison; 6–1, 6–0	(Netherlands) Kelly Versteeg	(France) Pauline Payet (Hungary) Lilla Barzó	(United Kingdom) Anna Brogan (United States) Alexandra Morozova (Italy) Giulia Pairone (France) Priscilla Heise
January 25	Saint Martin, France; Hard $10,000; Singles and doubles draws	(United States) Emina Bektas (United States) Alexa Bortles; 6–4, 6–2	(United States) Alexandra Morozova (Israel) Keren Shlomo	(France) Pauline Payet (Hungary) Lilla Barzó	(United Kingdom) Anna Brogan (United States) Alexandra Morozova (Italy) Giulia Pairone (France) Priscilla Heise
January 25	Hammamet, Tunisia; Clay $10,000; Singles and doubles draws	(Italy) Anastasia Grymalska; 7–6^{(7–3)}, 6–1	(France) Audrey Albié	(Romania) Cristina Ene (Belarus) Ilona Kremen	(Czech Republic) Gabriela Pantůčková (Romania) Michele Zmău (Moldova) Alexandra Perper (France) Alice Bacquié
January 25	Hammamet, Tunisia; Clay $10,000; Singles and doubles draws	(Russia) Nika Kukharchuk (Moldova) Alexandra Perper; 6–3, 7–5	(Italy) Anastasia Grymalska (Belarus) Ilona Kremen	(Romania) Cristina Ene (Belarus) Ilona Kremen	(Czech Republic) Gabriela Pantůčková (Romania) Michele Zmău (Moldova) Alexandra Perper (France) Alice Bacquié
January 25	Antalya, Turkey; Clay $10,000; Singles and doubles draws	(Turkey) Başak Eraydın; 3–6, 6–2, 6–4	(Armenia) Ani Amiraghyan	(Hungary) Ágnes Bukta (Turkey) Ayla Aksu	(Uzbekistan) Vlada Ekshibarova (France) Joséphine Boualem (Germany) Laura Schaeder (Hungary) Vanda Lukács
January 25	Antalya, Turkey; Clay $10,000; Singles and doubles draws	(Slovakia) Viktória Kužmová (Slovakia) Petra Uberalová; 7–6^{(7–3)}, 6–7^{(6–8)}, [10–5]	(North Macedonia) Lina Gjorcheska (Romania) Ioana Loredana Roșca	(Hungary) Ágnes Bukta (Turkey) Ayla Aksu	(Uzbekistan) Vlada Ekshibarova (France) Joséphine Boualem (Germany) Laura Schaeder (Hungary) Vanda Lukács

=== February ===
Week of	Tournament	Winner	Runners-up	Semifinalists	Quarterfinalists
February 1	Dow Corning Tennis Classic; Midland, United States; Hard (indoor) $100,000; Singles – Doubles	(United Kingdom) Naomi Broady; 6–7^{(6–8)}, 6–0, 6–2	(United States) Robin Anderson	(United States) Shelby Rogers (United States) Irina Falconi	(United States) Madison Brengle (Japan) Mayo Hibi (United States) Jamie Loeb (United States) Alexandra Sanford
February 1	Dow Corning Tennis Classic; Midland, United States; Hard (indoor) $100,000; Singles – Doubles	(United States) CiCi Bellis (United States) Ingrid Neel; 6–2, 6–4	(United Kingdom) Naomi Broady (United States) Shelby Rogers	(United States) Shelby Rogers (United States) Irina Falconi	(United States) Madison Brengle (Japan) Mayo Hibi (United States) Jamie Loeb (United States) Alexandra Sanford
February 1	Launceston International; Launceston, Australia; Hard $75,000; Singles – Doubles	(China) Han Xinyun; 6–1, 6–1	(Russia) Alla Kudryavtseva	(United States) Vania King (Japan) Risa Ozaki	(Ukraine) Nadiia Kichenok (Australia) Jessica Moore (China) Lu Jingjing (China) Yang Zhaoxuan
February 1	Launceston International; Launceston, Australia; Hard $75,000; Singles – Doubles	(China) You Xiaodi (China) Zhu Lin; 2–6, 7–5, [10–7]	(Ukraine) Nadiia Kichenok (Luxembourg) Mandy Minella	(United States) Vania King (Japan) Risa Ozaki	(Ukraine) Nadiia Kichenok (Australia) Jessica Moore (China) Lu Jingjing (China) Yang Zhaoxuan
February 1	Grenoble, France; Hard (indoor) $25,000; Singles and doubles draws	(France) Myrtille Georges; 7–6^{(7–4)}, 6–2	(Netherlands) Indy de Vroome	(Germany) Antonia Lottner (Germany) Tamara Korpatsch	(Spain) Sara Sorribes Tormo (France) Mathilde Johansson (France) Alizé Lim (Czech Republic) Tereza Smitková
February 1	Grenoble, France; Hard (indoor) $25,000; Singles and doubles draws	(France) Manon Arcangioli (France) Alizé Lim; 7–5, 6–2	(Belarus) Lidziya Marozava (Switzerland) Amra Sadiković	(Germany) Antonia Lottner (Germany) Tamara Korpatsch	(Spain) Sara Sorribes Tormo (France) Mathilde Johansson (France) Alizé Lim (Czech Republic) Tereza Smitková
February 1	Sharm el-Sheikh, Egypt; Hard $10,000; Singles and doubles draws	(Germany) Julia Wachaczyk; 4–6, 6–4, 6–3	(Russia) Sofya Zhuk	(Russia) Varvara Flink (Romania) Ioana Pietroiu	(Zimbabwe) Valeria Bhunu (Belgium) Britt Geukens (Germany) Nora Niedmers (India) Riya Bhatia
February 1	Sharm el-Sheikh, Egypt; Hard $10,000; Singles and doubles draws	(Germany) Nora Niedmers (Germany) Julia Wachaczyk; 6–2, 6–2	(Egypt) Ola Abou Zekry (Kazakhstan) Kamila Kerimbayeva	(Russia) Varvara Flink (Romania) Ioana Pietroiu	(Zimbabwe) Valeria Bhunu (Belgium) Britt Geukens (Germany) Nora Niedmers (India) Riya Bhatia
February 1	Hammamet, Tunisia; Clay $10,000; Singles and doubles draws	(Italy) Angelica Moratelli; 7–6^{(7–3)}, 6–4	(France) Audrey Albié	(Belgium) Déborah Kerfs (Czech Republic) Magdaléna Pantůčková	(Algeria) Inès Ibbou (Moldova) Alexandra Perper (Greece) Eleni Kordolaimi (Romania) Elena Bogdan
February 1	Hammamet, Tunisia; Clay $10,000; Singles and doubles draws	(Canada) Petra Januskova (Italy) Angelica Moratelli; 6–1, 6–2	(Belgium) Déborah Kerfs (Germany) Alina Wessel	(Belgium) Déborah Kerfs (Czech Republic) Magdaléna Pantůčková	(Algeria) Inès Ibbou (Moldova) Alexandra Perper (Greece) Eleni Kordolaimi (Romania) Elena Bogdan
February 1	Antalya, Turkey; Clay $10,000; Singles and doubles draws	(Germany) Anne Schäfer; 2–6, 6–2, 6–0	(Slovakia) Viktória Kužmová	(Turkey) Melis Sezer (Austria) Julia Grabher	(Armenia) Ani Amiraghyan (Slovenia) Nastja Kolar (Turkey) Ayla Aksu (Germany) Laura Schaeder
February 1	Antalya, Turkey; Clay $10,000; Singles and doubles draws	(Hungary) Ágnes Bukta (Austria) Julia Grabher; 6–3, 6–4	(Romania) Daiana Negreanu (India) Kyra Shroff	(Turkey) Melis Sezer (Austria) Julia Grabher	(Armenia) Ani Amiraghyan (Slovenia) Nastja Kolar (Turkey) Ayla Aksu (Germany) Laura Schaeder
February 1	Aegon GB Pro-Series Glasgow; Glasgow, United Kingdom; Hard (indoor) $10,000; Singles and doubles draws	(Germany) Anna Zaja; 6–4, 6–3	(United Kingdom) Maia Lumsden	(Romania) Karola Bejenaru (United Kingdom) Katie Boulter	(France) Julie Gervais (China) Li Yixuan (Belgium) Klaartje Liebens (Liechtenstein) Kathinka von Deichmann
February 1	Aegon GB Pro-Series Glasgow; Glasgow, United Kingdom; Hard (indoor) $10,000; Singles and doubles draws	(Switzerland) Nina Stadler (Belgium) Kimberley Zimmermann; 6–2, 7–6^{(9–7)}	(Oman) Fatma Al-Nabhani (Germany) Anna Zaja	(Romania) Karola Bejenaru (United Kingdom) Katie Boulter	(France) Julie Gervais (China) Li Yixuan (Belgium) Klaartje Liebens (Liechtenstein) Kathinka von Deichmann
February 8	Perth, Australia; Hard $25,000; Singles and doubles draws	(Australia) Jaimee Fourlis; 6–4, 2–6, 7–6^{(7–1)}	(South Korea) Jang Su-jeong	(Russia) Anastasia Pivovarova (United States) Jennifer Elie	(Australia) Maddison Inglis (France) Tessah Andrianjafitrimo (Australia) Storm Sanders (Japan) Risa Ozaki
February 8	Perth, Australia; Hard $25,000; Singles and doubles draws	(Australia) Ashleigh Barty (Australia) Jessica Moore; 3–6, 6–4, [10–8]	(Australia) Alison Bai (Australia) Abbie Myers	(Russia) Anastasia Pivovarova (United States) Jennifer Elie	(Australia) Maddison Inglis (France) Tessah Andrianjafitrimo (Australia) Storm Sanders (Japan) Risa Ozaki
February 8	Sharm el-Sheikh, Egypt; Hard $10,000; Singles and doubles draws	(Russia) Sofya Zhuk; 6–2, 6–1	(Bulgaria) Julia Terziyska	(Ukraine) Veronika Kapshay (Russia) Varvara Flink	(Austria) Lisa-Maria Moser (Sweden) Brenda Njuki (Belgium) Britt Geukens (Zimbabwe) Valeria Bhunu
February 8	Sharm el-Sheikh, Egypt; Hard $10,000; Singles and doubles draws	(Belgium) Britt Geukens (Romania) Oana Georgeta Simion; 2–6, 6–3, [10–7]	(Germany) Nora Niedmers (Germany) Julia Wachaczyk	(Ukraine) Veronika Kapshay (Russia) Varvara Flink	(Austria) Lisa-Maria Moser (Sweden) Brenda Njuki (Belgium) Britt Geukens (Zimbabwe) Valeria Bhunu
February 8	Trnava, Slovakia; Hard (indoor) $10,000; Singles and doubles draws	(Russia) Ekaterina Alexandrova; 6–1, 6–3	(Czech Republic) Karolína Muchová	(Slovakia) Chantal Škamlová (Slovakia) Rebecca Šramková	(Slovakia) Lenka Juríková (Czech Republic) Tereza Malíková (Czech Republic) Pernilla Mendesová (Russia) Anna Blinkova
February 8	Trnava, Slovakia; Hard (indoor) $10,000; Singles and doubles draws	(Hungary) Réka Luca Jani (Slovakia) Chantal Škamlová; 6–3, 2–6, [10–7]	(Slovakia) Lenka Juríková (Czech Republic) Tereza Malíková	(Slovakia) Chantal Škamlová (Slovakia) Rebecca Šramková	(Slovakia) Lenka Juríková (Czech Republic) Tereza Malíková (Czech Republic) Pernilla Mendesová (Russia) Anna Blinkova
February 8	Hammamet, Tunisia; Clay $10,000; Singles and doubles draws	(Italy) Angelica Moratelli; 6–2, 6–2	(France) Margot Yerolymos	(Italy) Anastasia Grymalska (Egypt) Sandra Samir	(Serbia) Tamara Čurović (Belgium) Déborah Kerfs (Moldova) Anastasia Vdovenco (Greece) Eleni Kordolaimi
February 8	Hammamet, Tunisia; Clay $10,000; Singles and doubles draws	(Italy) Anastasia Grymalska (Belgium) Déborah Kerfs; Walkover	(Greece) Eleni Kordolaimi (Moldova) Alexandra Perper	(Italy) Anastasia Grymalska (Egypt) Sandra Samir	(Serbia) Tamara Čurović (Belgium) Déborah Kerfs (Moldova) Anastasia Vdovenco (Greece) Eleni Kordolaimi
February 8	Antalya, Turkey; Clay $10,000; Singles and doubles draws	(Germany) Anne Schäfer; 6–3, 6–1	(Georgia (country)) Sofia Kvatsabaia	(Austria) Julia Grabher (Georgia (country)) Ekaterine Gorgodze	(Romania) Daiana Negreanu (Belgium) Steffi Distelmans (France) Joséphine Boualem (Armenia) Ani Amiraghyan
February 8	Antalya, Turkey; Clay $10,000; Singles and doubles draws	(Belgium) Steffi Distelmans (Romania) Daiana Negreanu; 6–0, 6–2	(France) Joséphine Boualem (China) Li Yuenu	(Austria) Julia Grabher (Georgia (country)) Ekaterine Gorgodze	(Romania) Daiana Negreanu (Belgium) Steffi Distelmans (France) Joséphine Boualem (Armenia) Ani Amiraghyan
February 8	Sunderland, United Kingdom; Hard (indoor) $10,000; Singles and doubles draws	(Liechtenstein) Kathinka von Deichmann; 6–3, 7–6^{(7–2)}	(France) Manon Arcangioli	(United Kingdom) Katy Dunne (United Kingdom) Maia Lumsden	(Switzerland) Tess Sugnaux (Belgium) Klaartje Liebens (Belgium) Elyne Boeykens (Croatia) Silvia Njirić
February 8	Sunderland, United Kingdom; Hard (indoor) $10,000; Singles and doubles draws	(United Kingdom) Emily Arbuthnott (Denmark) Emilie Francati; 6–3, 4–6, [10–5]	(France) Manon Arcangioli (United Kingdom) Harriet Dart	(United Kingdom) Katy Dunne (United Kingdom) Maia Lumsden	(Switzerland) Tess Sugnaux (Belgium) Klaartje Liebens (Belgium) Elyne Boeykens (Croatia) Silvia Njirić
February 15	Perth, Australia; Hard $25,000; Singles and doubles draws	(Australia) Arina Rodionova; 6–1, 6–1	(Belarus) Aryna Sabalenka	(Australia) Storm Sanders (China) Tian Ran	(South Korea) Han Na-lae (Czech Republic) Barbora Štefková (Poland) Katarzyna Piter (Austria) Barbara Haas
February 15	Perth, Australia; Hard $25,000; Singles and doubles draws	(Australia) Tammi Patterson (Poland) Katarzyna Piter; 4–6, 6–2, [10–3]	(South Korea) Han Na-lae (South Korea) Jang Su-jeong	(Australia) Storm Sanders (China) Tian Ran	(South Korea) Han Na-lae (Czech Republic) Barbora Štefková (Poland) Katarzyna Piter (Austria) Barbara Haas
February 15	Altenkirchen, Germany; Carpet (indoor) $25,000; Singles and doubles draws	(Belgium) Ysaline Bonaventure; 6–3, 6–3	(Netherlands) Arantxa Rus	(Austria) Tamira Paszek (France) Océane Dodin	(Switzerland) Xenia Knoll (Serbia) Ivana Jorović (Belgium) Elise Mertens (Greece) Valentini Grammatikopoulou
February 15	Altenkirchen, Germany; Carpet (indoor) $25,000; Singles and doubles draws	(Belgium) Ysaline Bonaventure (Switzerland) Xenia Knoll; 6–1, 6–4	(Israel) Deniz Khazaniuk (Russia) Maria Marfutina	(Austria) Tamira Paszek (France) Océane Dodin	(Switzerland) Xenia Knoll (Serbia) Ivana Jorović (Belgium) Elise Mertens (Greece) Valentini Grammatikopoulou
February 15	Delhi Open; New Delhi, India; Hard $25,000; Singles and doubles draws	(Uzbekistan) Sabina Sharipova; 3–6, 6–2, 6–4	(Serbia) Nina Stojanović	(Thailand) Kamonwan Buayam (India) Ankita Raina	(Ukraine) Anastasiya Vasylyeva (Italy) Corinna Dentoni (Chinese Taipei) Lee Ya-hsuan (Russia) Anna Morgina
February 15	Delhi Open; New Delhi, India; Hard $25,000; Singles and doubles draws	(Chinese Taipei) Hsu Ching-wen (Chinese Taipei) Lee Ya-hsuan; 6–0, 0–6, [10–6]	(Russia) Natela Dzalamidze (Russia) Veronika Kudermetova	(Thailand) Kamonwan Buayam (India) Ankita Raina	(Ukraine) Anastasiya Vasylyeva (Italy) Corinna Dentoni (Chinese Taipei) Lee Ya-hsuan (Russia) Anna Morgina
February 15	Morelos Open; Cuernavaca, Mexico; Hard $25,000; Singles and doubles draws	(Czech Republic) Marie Bouzková; 0–6, 6–0, 6–1	(United States) Lauren Albanese	(Mexico) Renata Zarazúa (Bulgaria) Aleksandrina Naydenova	(Mexico) Ana Sofía Sánchez (France) Victoria Muntean (United States) Nicole Coopersmith (China) Xu Shilin
February 15	Morelos Open; Cuernavaca, Mexico; Hard $25,000; Singles and doubles draws	(Bulgaria) Aleksandrina Naydenova (Hungary) Fanny Stollár; 6–3, 6–2	(Ukraine) Elizaveta Ianchuk (Czech Republic) Kateřina Kramperová	(Mexico) Renata Zarazúa (Bulgaria) Aleksandrina Naydenova	(Mexico) Ana Sofía Sánchez (France) Victoria Muntean (United States) Nicole Coopersmith (China) Xu Shilin
February 15	Surprise, United States; Hard $25,000; Singles and doubles draws	(United States) Jamie Loeb; 3–6, 6–1, 6–3	(United States) CiCi Bellis	(United States) Sofia Kenin (United States) Chiara Scholl	(United States) Kayla Day (Canada) Aleksandra Wozniak (Turkey) Başak Eraydın (United States) Danielle Lao
February 15	Surprise, United States; Hard $25,000; Singles and doubles draws	(United States) Jacqueline Cako (United States) Danielle Lao; 6–2, 4–6, [10–8]	(United States) Emina Bektas (United States) Sarah Lee	(United States) Sofia Kenin (United States) Chiara Scholl	(United States) Kayla Day (Canada) Aleksandra Wozniak (Turkey) Başak Eraydın (United States) Danielle Lao
February 15	Sharm el-Sheikh, Egypt; Hard $10,000; Singles and doubles draws	(Bulgaria) Julia Terziyska; 6–4, 6–3	(Russia) Varvara Flink	(France) Pauline Payet (Belgium) Hélène Scholsen	(Belgium) Britt Geukens (Romania) Elena-Teodora Cadar (South Korea) Kim Dabin (France) Caroline Roméo
February 15	Sharm el-Sheikh, Egypt; Hard $10,000; Singles and doubles draws	(South Africa) Ilze Hattingh (South Africa) Madrie Le Roux; 6–1, 6–2	(Romania) Oana Georgeta Simion (Bulgaria) Julia Terziyska	(France) Pauline Payet (Belgium) Hélène Scholsen	(Belgium) Britt Geukens (Romania) Elena-Teodora Cadar (South Korea) Kim Dabin (France) Caroline Roméo
February 15	Palma Nova, Spain; Clay $10,000; Singles and doubles draws	(Italy) Martina Di Giuseppe; 7–6^{(7–5)}, 6–2	(Norway) Melanie Stokke	(Spain) Irene Burillo Escorihuela (Spain) Eva Guerrero Álvarez	(Russia) Valeria Savinykh (France) Estelle Cascino (Switzerland) Ylena In-Albon (United Kingdom) Gabriella Taylor
February 15	Palma Nova, Spain; Clay $10,000; Singles and doubles draws	(Russia) Valeria Savinykh (Ukraine) Alyona Sotnikova; 2–6, 6–4, [10–6]	(United Kingdom) Amanda Carreras (Italy) Alice Savoretti	(Spain) Irene Burillo Escorihuela (Spain) Eva Guerrero Álvarez	(Russia) Valeria Savinykh (France) Estelle Cascino (Switzerland) Ylena In-Albon (United Kingdom) Gabriella Taylor
February 15	Hammamet, Tunisia; Clay $10,000; Singles and doubles draws	(France) Victoria Larrière; 6–1, 6–4	(Egypt) Sandra Samir	(Slovakia) Chantal Škamlová (France) Margot Yerolymos	(Greece) Despina Papamichail (United Kingdom) Mirabelle Njoze (Serbia) Milana Spremo (Italy) Claudia Giovine
February 15	Hammamet, Tunisia; Clay $10,000; Singles and doubles draws	(Canada) Petra Januskova (Belarus) Sviatlana Pirazhenka; 6–3, 6–2	(Greece) Despina Papamichail (Slovakia) Chantal Škamlová	(Slovakia) Chantal Škamlová (France) Margot Yerolymos	(Greece) Despina Papamichail (United Kingdom) Mirabelle Njoze (Serbia) Milana Spremo (Italy) Claudia Giovine
February 15	Antalya, Turkey; Clay $10,000; Singles and doubles draws	(Romania) Elena Gabriela Ruse; 7–6^{(7–3)}, 0–6, 6–1	(France) Joséphine Boualem	(Austria) Julia Grabher (Bulgaria) Viktoriya Tomova	(Croatia) Mariana Dražić (Turkey) Berfu Cengiz (Japan) Natsumi Chimura (Serbia) Marina Kačar
February 15	Antalya, Turkey; Clay $10,000; Singles and doubles draws	(Bulgaria) Petia Arshinkova (Romania) Elena Gabriela Ruse; 7–6^{(7–0)}, 6–4	(Greece) Eleni Daniilidou (Uzbekistan) Arina Folts	(Austria) Julia Grabher (Bulgaria) Viktoriya Tomova	(Croatia) Mariana Dražić (Turkey) Berfu Cengiz (Japan) Natsumi Chimura (Serbia) Marina Kačar
February 15	Wirral, United Kingdom; Hard (indoor) $10,000; Singles and doubles draws	(Croatia) Silvia Njirić; 3–6, 7–6^{(7–2)}, 6–3	(Belgium) Klaartje Liebens	(France) Manon Arcangioli (Switzerland) Tess Sugnaux	(France) Claire Feuerstein (France) Harmony Tan (United Kingdom) Harriet Dart (Slovakia) Natália Vajdová
February 15	Wirral, United Kingdom; Hard (indoor) $10,000; Singles and doubles draws	(United Kingdom) Sarah Beth Askew (United Kingdom) Olivia Nicholls; 6–2, 1–6, [10–8]	(United States) Veronica Corning (United Kingdom) Harriet Dart	(France) Manon Arcangioli (Switzerland) Tess Sugnaux	(France) Claire Feuerstein (France) Harmony Tan (United Kingdom) Harriet Dart (Slovakia) Natália Vajdová
February 22	ITF Women's Circuit UBS Thurgau; Kreuzlingen, Switzerland; Carpet (indoor) $50,000; Singles – Doubles	(Czech Republic) Kristýna Plíšková; 7–6^{(7–4)}, 7–6^{(7–3)}	(Switzerland) Amra Sadiković	(Russia) Ekaterina Alexandrova (Ukraine) Kateryna Kozlova	(France) Océane Dodin (Serbia) Ivana Jorović (Belgium) Marie Benoît (Italy) Gioia Barbieri
February 22	ITF Women's Circuit UBS Thurgau; Kreuzlingen, Switzerland; Carpet (indoor) $50,000; Singles – Doubles	(Germany) Antonia Lottner (Switzerland) Amra Sadiković; 5–7, 6–2, [10–5]	(Croatia) Tena Lukas (United States) Bernarda Pera	(Russia) Ekaterina Alexandrova (Ukraine) Kateryna Kozlova	(France) Océane Dodin (Serbia) Ivana Jorović (Belgium) Marie Benoît (Italy) Gioia Barbieri
February 22	Port Pirie, Australia; Hard $25,000; Singles and doubles draws	(Austria) Barbara Haas; 6–4, 5–7, 6–4	(Australia) Arina Rodionova	(Australia) Jessica Moore (Japan) Riko Sawayanagi	(Australia) Alison Bai (France) Tessah Andrianjafitrimo (Chinese Taipei) Lee Ya-hsuan (Slovakia) Zuzana Zlochová
February 22	Port Pirie, Australia; Hard $25,000; Singles and doubles draws	(Chinese Taipei) Lee Ya-hsuan (Japan) Riko Sawayanagi; 6–4, 7–5	(Australia) Ashleigh Barty (Australia) Casey Dellacqua	(Australia) Jessica Moore (Japan) Riko Sawayanagi	(Australia) Alison Bai (France) Tessah Andrianjafitrimo (Chinese Taipei) Lee Ya-hsuan (Slovakia) Zuzana Zlochová
February 22	São Paulo, Brazil; Clay $25,000; Singles and doubles draws	(Spain) Sara Sorribes Tormo; 7–5, 6–1	(Romania) Andreea Mitu	(Romania) Ana Bogdan (Romania) Sorana Cîrstea	(France) Myrtille Georges (Slovenia) Tamara Zidanšek (Netherlands) Cindy Burger (Switzerland) Jil Teichmann
February 22	São Paulo, Brazil; Clay $25,000; Singles and doubles draws	(Argentina) Catalina Pella (Chile) Daniela Seguel; 6–3, 6–1	(United Kingdom) Tara Moore (Switzerland) Conny Perrin	(Romania) Ana Bogdan (Romania) Sorana Cîrstea	(France) Myrtille Georges (Slovenia) Tamara Zidanšek (Netherlands) Cindy Burger (Switzerland) Jil Teichmann
February 22	Beinasco, Italy; Clay (indoor) $25,000; Singles and doubles draws	(Bulgaria) Isabella Shinikova; 1–6, 6–2, 6–2	(Italy) Jessica Pieri	(Slovakia) Vivien Juhászová (Italy) Giulia Gatto-Monticone	(Netherlands) Arantxa Rus (North Macedonia) Lina Gjorcheska (Romania) Cristina Dinu (Belgium) Déborah Kerfs
February 22	Beinasco, Italy; Clay (indoor) $25,000; Singles and doubles draws	(Netherlands) Arantxa Rus (Turkey) İpek Soylu; 6–4, 6–2	(North Macedonia) Lina Gjorcheska (Bosnia and Herzegovina) Dea Herdželaš	(Slovakia) Vivien Juhászová (Italy) Giulia Gatto-Monticone	(Netherlands) Arantxa Rus (North Macedonia) Lina Gjorcheska (Romania) Cristina Dinu (Belgium) Déborah Kerfs
February 22	Moscow, Russia; Hard (indoor) $25,000; Singles and doubles draws	(Russia) Irina Khromacheva; 6–7^{(7–9)}, 6–4, 6–3	(Russia) Yana Sizikova	(Belgium) Elise Mertens (Slovakia) Kristína Schmiedlová	(Russia) Anastasia Gasanova (Russia) Alena Tarasova (Russia) Natela Dzalamidze (Russia) Yulia Bryzgalova
February 22	Moscow, Russia; Hard (indoor) $25,000; Singles and doubles draws	(Russia) Anastasiya Komardina (Serbia) Nina Stojanović; 6–7^{(5–7)}, 6–1, [12–10]	(Russia) Polina Monova (Russia) Yana Sizikova	(Belgium) Elise Mertens (Slovakia) Kristína Schmiedlová	(Russia) Anastasia Gasanova (Russia) Alena Tarasova (Russia) Natela Dzalamidze (Russia) Yulia Bryzgalova
February 22	Rancho Santa Fe, United States; Hard $25,000; Singles and doubles draws	(China) Zhang Shuai; 1–6, 7–5, 6–4	(United States) Vania King	(United States) Julia Boserup (United States) Asia Muhammad	(Netherlands) Indy de Vroome (France) Chloé Paquet (United States) CiCi Bellis (United States) Raveena Kingsley
February 22	Rancho Santa Fe, United States; Hard $25,000; Singles and doubles draws	(United States) Asia Muhammad (United States) Taylor Townsend; 6–3, 6–4	(United States) Jessica Pegula (Canada) Carol Zhao	(United States) Julia Boserup (United States) Asia Muhammad	(Netherlands) Indy de Vroome (France) Chloé Paquet (United States) CiCi Bellis (United States) Raveena Kingsley
February 22	Sharm el-Sheikh, Egypt; Hard $10,000; Singles and doubles draws	(Slovakia) Tereza Mihalíková; 6–1, 6–4	(Russia) Varvara Flink	(Russia) Anastasia Nefedova (Ukraine) Veronika Kapshay	(Russia) Anna Morgina (Sweden) Kajsa Rinaldo Persson (Sweden) Jacqueline Cabaj Awad (Romania) Oana Georgeta Simion
February 22	Sharm el-Sheikh, Egypt; Hard $10,000; Singles and doubles draws	(Romania) Elena-Teodora Cadar (Romania) Oana Georgeta Simion; 6–3, 6–2	(Sweden) Jacqueline Cabaj Awad (Ukraine) Veronika Kapshay	(Russia) Anastasia Nefedova (Ukraine) Veronika Kapshay	(Russia) Anna Morgina (Sweden) Kajsa Rinaldo Persson (Sweden) Jacqueline Cabaj Awad (Romania) Oana Georgeta Simion
February 22	Palma Nova, Spain; Clay $10,000; Singles and doubles draws	(Spain) Olga Sáez Larra; 6–2, 6–4	(Australia) Isabelle Wallace	(Italy) Martina Di Giuseppe (Norway) Melanie Stokke	(Colombia) Yuliana Lizarazo (United Kingdom) Gabriella Taylor (Spain) Irene Burillo Escorihuela (Spain) Júlia Payola
February 22	Palma Nova, Spain; Clay $10,000; Singles and doubles draws	(Italy) Martina Di Giuseppe (Italy) Giorgia Marchetti; 6–2, 6–4	(Colombia) Yuliana Lizarazo (Italy) Miriana Tona	(Italy) Martina Di Giuseppe (Norway) Melanie Stokke	(Colombia) Yuliana Lizarazo (United Kingdom) Gabriella Taylor (Spain) Irene Burillo Escorihuela (Spain) Júlia Payola
February 22	Hammamet, Tunisia; Clay $10,000; Singles and doubles draws	(Slovakia) Chantal Škamlová; 6–1, 4–6, 6–3	(Greece) Despina Papamichail	(Belarus) Sviatlana Pirazhenka (Egypt) Sandra Samir	(Italy) Rosanna Maffei (Italy) Verena Meliss (Hungary) Vanda Lukács (Portugal) Inês Murta
February 22	Hammamet, Tunisia; Clay $10,000; Singles and doubles draws	(Greece) Despina Papamichail (Slovakia) Chantal Škamlová; 6–2, 6–7^{(5–7)}, [10–5]	(Canada) Petra Januskova (Belarus) Sviatlana Pirazhenka	(Belarus) Sviatlana Pirazhenka (Egypt) Sandra Samir	(Italy) Rosanna Maffei (Italy) Verena Meliss (Hungary) Vanda Lukács (Portugal) Inês Murta
February 22	Antalya, Turkey; Clay $10,000; Singles and doubles draws	(Romania) Elena Gabriela Ruse; 7–5, 4–6, 6–2	(Slovenia) Nina Potočnik	(Moldova) Alexandra Perper (Slovakia) Petra Uberalová	(Bulgaria) Viktoriya Tomova (Romania) Ioana Loredana Roșca (Serbia) Marina Kačar (Austria) Mira Antonitsch
February 22	Antalya, Turkey; Clay $10,000; Singles and doubles draws	(United States) Dasha Ivanova (Romania) Elena Gabriela Ruse; 7–6^{(7–1)}, 6–1	(Croatia) Adrijana Lekaj (Bulgaria) Viktoriya Tomova	(Moldova) Alexandra Perper (Slovakia) Petra Uberalová	(Bulgaria) Viktoriya Tomova (Romania) Ioana Loredana Roșca (Serbia) Marina Kačar (Austria) Mira Antonitsch
February 29	Mildura, Australia; Grass $25,000; Singles and doubles draws	(Russia) Anastasia Pivovarova; 6–4, 4–6, 7–5	(Czech Republic) Barbora Štefková	(Croatia) Ana Vrljić (Australia) Sara Tomic	(United Kingdom) Lisa Whybourn (United Kingdom) Katy Dunne (Australia) Jaimee Fourlis (Australia) Storm Sanders
February 29	Mildura, Australia; Grass $25,000; Singles and doubles draws	(Australia) Olivia Tjandramulia (United States) Jessica Wacnik; 6–0, 6–3	(Japan) Mana Ayukawa (Japan) Yuuki Tanaka	(Croatia) Ana Vrljić (Australia) Sara Tomic	(United Kingdom) Lisa Whybourn (United Kingdom) Katy Dunne (Australia) Jaimee Fourlis (Australia) Storm Sanders
February 29	Campinas, Brazil; Clay $25,000; Singles and doubles draws	(Ukraine) Dayana Yastremska; 6–4, 6–4	(France) Alizé Lim	(Argentina) Catalina Pella (Spain) Sara Sorribes Tormo	(Switzerland) Conny Perrin (Hungary) Réka Luca Jani (Romania) Ana Bogdan (Italy) Nastassja Burnett
February 29	Campinas, Brazil; Clay $25,000; Singles and doubles draws	(Brazil) Gabriela Cé (Argentina) Florencia Molinero; 1–6, 6–4, [10–4]	(Argentina) Guadalupe Pérez Rojas (Argentina) Nadia Podoroska	(Argentina) Catalina Pella (Spain) Sara Sorribes Tormo	(Switzerland) Conny Perrin (Hungary) Réka Luca Jani (Romania) Ana Bogdan (Italy) Nastassja Burnett
February 29	Nanjing, China; Hard $10,000; Singles and doubles draws	(Russia) Anastasia Gasanova; 6–1, 6–1	(Chinese Taipei) Hsu Ching-wen	(China) Xun Fangying (China) Gai Ao	(China) Guo Shanshan (China) Zhao Di (Chinese Taipei) Lee Pei-chi (China) Tang Haochen
February 29	Nanjing, China; Hard $10,000; Singles and doubles draws	(China) Li Yihong (China) Wang Yan; 6–2, 6–3	(China) Chen Jiahui (China) Xin Yuan	(China) Xun Fangying (China) Gai Ao	(China) Guo Shanshan (China) Zhao Di (Chinese Taipei) Lee Pei-chi (China) Tang Haochen
February 29	Sharm el-Sheikh, Egypt; Hard $10,000; Singles and doubles draws	(Slovakia) Viktória Kužmová; 4–6, 6–2, 6–1	(Russia) Varvara Flink	(Russia) Anna Morgina (Oman) Fatma Al-Nabhani	(Sweden) Fanny Östlund (United Kingdom) Katie Boulter (France) Caroline Roméo (Romania) Elena-Teodora Cadar
February 29	Sharm el-Sheikh, Egypt; Hard $10,000; Singles and doubles draws	(Ukraine) Alona Fomina (Russia) Ekaterina Yashina; 6–1, 4–6, [10–8]	(Russia) Anastasiya Komardina (Russia) Anna Morgina	(Russia) Anna Morgina (Oman) Fatma Al-Nabhani	(Sweden) Fanny Östlund (United Kingdom) Katie Boulter (France) Caroline Roméo (Romania) Elena-Teodora Cadar
February 29	Mâcon, France; Hard (indoor) $10,000; Singles and doubles draws	(France) Claire Feuerstein; 6–2, 4–6, 6–4	(Serbia) Vesna Dolonc	(France) Irina Ramialison (France) Manon Arcangioli	(Latvia) Diāna Marcinkēviča (Belgium) Klaartje Liebens (Belgium) Sofie Oyen (Belarus) Vera Lapko
February 29	Mâcon, France; Hard (indoor) $10,000; Singles and doubles draws	(France) Manon Arcangioli (Croatia) Silvia Njirić; 7–5, 7–6^{(7–5)}	(Denmark) Emilie Francati (Belarus) Vera Lapko	(France) Irina Ramialison (France) Manon Arcangioli	(Latvia) Diāna Marcinkēviča (Belgium) Klaartje Liebens (Belgium) Sofie Oyen (Belarus) Vera Lapko
February 29	Tarragona, Spain; Clay $10,000; Singles and doubles draws	(France) Joséphine Boualem; 7–6^{(7–4)}, 6–7^{(1–7)}, 6–2	(Romania) Irina Maria Bara	(Spain) Georgina García Pérez (Spain) Olga Sáez Larra	(Italy) Alice Savoretti (Spain) Irene Burillo Escorihuela (Belgium) Elyne Boeykens (Spain) Eva Guerrero Álvarez
February 29	Tarragona, Spain; Clay $10,000; Singles and doubles draws	(Romania) Irina Maria Bara (Ukraine) Alyona Sotnikova; 7–5, 3–6, [10–8]	(Spain) Georgina García Pérez (Spain) Olga Sáez Larra	(Spain) Georgina García Pérez (Spain) Olga Sáez Larra	(Italy) Alice Savoretti (Spain) Irene Burillo Escorihuela (Belgium) Elyne Boeykens (Spain) Eva Guerrero Álvarez
February 29	Hammamet, Tunisia; Clay $10,000; Singles and doubles draws	(Austria) Julia Grabher; 6–3, 6–3	(Hungary) Vanda Lukács	(Italy) Angelica Moratelli (Portugal) Inês Murta	(Bulgaria) Isabella Shinikova (Russia) Polina Monova (Romania) Cristina Ene (Romania) Cristina Adamescu
February 29	Hammamet, Tunisia; Clay $10,000; Singles and doubles draws	(Austria) Julia Grabher (Bulgaria) Isabella Shinikova; 7–5, 6–0	(Russia) Yuliya Kalabina (Russia) Polina Monova	(Italy) Angelica Moratelli (Portugal) Inês Murta	(Bulgaria) Isabella Shinikova (Russia) Polina Monova (Romania) Cristina Ene (Romania) Cristina Adamescu
February 29	Antalya, Turkey; Clay $10,000; Singles and doubles draws	(Bulgaria) Viktoriya Tomova; 4–6, 6–2, 7–5	(Sweden) Susanne Celik	(Romania) Ioana Loredana Roșca (Switzerland) Lisa Sabino	(Hungary) Csilla Argyelán (Czech Republic) Tereza Malíková (Croatia) Adrijana Lekaj (Italy) Corinna Dentoni
February 29	Antalya, Turkey; Clay $10,000; Singles and doubles draws	(Slovakia) Vivien Juhászová (Czech Republic) Tereza Malíková; 6–0, 6–4	(Romania) Raluca Ciufrilă (Romania) Ioana Loredana Roșca	(Romania) Ioana Loredana Roșca (Switzerland) Lisa Sabino	(Hungary) Csilla Argyelán (Czech Republic) Tereza Malíková (Croatia) Adrijana Lekaj (Italy) Corinna Dentoni

=== March ===
Week of	Tournament	Winner	Runners-up	Semifinalists	Quarterfinalists
March 7	Curitiba, Brazil; Clay $25,000; Singles and doubles draws	(Argentina) Catalina Pella; 5–7, 6–4, 6–2	(Netherlands) Cindy Burger	(Hungary) Réka Luca Jani (United States) Robin Anderson	(France) Alizé Lim (France) Myrtille Georges (Switzerland) Conny Perrin (Italy) Martina Caregaro
March 7	Curitiba, Brazil; Clay $25,000; Singles and doubles draws	(Argentina) Catalina Pella (Chile) Daniela Seguel; 6–3, 7–6^{(7–5)}	(Italy) Martina Caregaro (Hungary) Réka Luca Jani	(Hungary) Réka Luca Jani (United States) Robin Anderson	(France) Alizé Lim (France) Myrtille Georges (Switzerland) Conny Perrin (Italy) Martina Caregaro
March 7	Abierto de Puebla; Puebla, Mexico; Hard (indoor) $25,000; Singles and doubles draws	(Russia) Irina Khromacheva; 6–3, 6–2	(Netherlands) Richèl Hogenkamp	(France) Océane Dodin (Bulgaria) Elitsa Kostova	(Hungary) Fanny Stollár (Mexico) Renata Zarazúa (Bulgaria) Aleksandrina Naydenova (Slovakia) Rebecca Šramková
March 7	Abierto de Puebla; Puebla, Mexico; Hard (indoor) $25,000; Singles and doubles draws	(Japan) Akiko Omae (India) Prarthana Thombare; 6–4, 2–6, [10–8]	(Russia) Irina Khromacheva (Russia) Ksenia Lykina	(France) Océane Dodin (Bulgaria) Elitsa Kostova	(Hungary) Fanny Stollár (Mexico) Renata Zarazúa (Bulgaria) Aleksandrina Naydenova (Slovakia) Rebecca Šramková
March 7	Nanjing, China; Hard $10,000; Singles and doubles draws	(China) Liu Fangzhou; 6–3, 6–2	(China) Tian Ran	(China) Zhao Di (Hong Kong) Zhang Ling	(China) Sun Xuliu (Chinese Taipei) Hsu Ching-wen (China) Zhang Yukun (China) Wang Yan
March 7	Nanjing, China; Hard $10,000; Singles and doubles draws	(Chinese Taipei) Lee Pei-chi (China) Zhang Ying; 6–2, 7–5	(China) Xun Fangying (China) Zhao Di	(China) Zhao Di (Hong Kong) Zhang Ling	(China) Sun Xuliu (Chinese Taipei) Hsu Ching-wen (China) Zhang Yukun (China) Wang Yan
March 7	Sharm el-Sheikh, Egypt; Hard $10,000; Singles and doubles draws	(Russia) Anna Morgina; 1–6, 6–0, 6–3	(Czech Republic) Karolína Muchová	(Russia) Anastasiya Komardina (Bulgaria) Julia Terziyska	(Russia) Ekaterina Yashina (Estonia) Valeria Gorlats (Germany) Anna Zaja (Oman) Fatma Al-Nabhani
March 7	Sharm el-Sheikh, Egypt; Hard $10,000; Singles and doubles draws	(Ukraine) Alona Fomina (Russia) Ekaterina Yashina; 7–6^{(7–2)}, 3–6, [10–8]	(Russia) Anastasiya Komardina (Russia) Anna Morgina	(Russia) Anastasiya Komardina (Bulgaria) Julia Terziyska	(Russia) Ekaterina Yashina (Estonia) Valeria Gorlats (Germany) Anna Zaja (Oman) Fatma Al-Nabhani
March 7	Amiens, France; Clay (indoor) $10,000; Singles and doubles draws	(Germany) Laura Schaeder; 1–6, 6–3, 6–3	(Italy) Gioia Barbieri	(Germany) Katharina Hobgarski (Argentina) Tatiana Búa	(France) Elixane Lechemia (Italy) Martina Di Giuseppe (Belgium) Klaartje Liebens (Belgium) Déborah Kerfs
March 7	Amiens, France; Clay (indoor) $10,000; Singles and doubles draws	(Italy) Gioia Barbieri (Italy) Giorgia Marchetti; 6–3, 6–4	(France) Alice Bacquié (Belgium) Kimberley Zimmermann	(Germany) Katharina Hobgarski (Argentina) Tatiana Búa	(France) Elixane Lechemia (Italy) Martina Di Giuseppe (Belgium) Klaartje Liebens (Belgium) Déborah Kerfs
March 7	Hammamet, Tunisia; Clay $10,000; Singles and doubles draws	(Bulgaria) Isabella Shinikova; 6–4, 6–4	(Austria) Julia Grabher	(France) Margot Yerolymos (North Macedonia) Lina Gjorcheska	(Italy) Federica Prati (Czech Republic) Magdaléna Pantůčková (Italy) Angelica Moratelli (Russia) Polina Monova
March 7	Hammamet, Tunisia; Clay $10,000; Singles and doubles draws	(Austria) Julia Grabher (Hungary) Naomi Totka; 7–5, 1–6, [13–11]	(North Macedonia) Lina Gjorcheska (Bulgaria) Isabella Shinikova	(France) Margot Yerolymos (North Macedonia) Lina Gjorcheska	(Italy) Federica Prati (Czech Republic) Magdaléna Pantůčková (Italy) Angelica Moratelli (Russia) Polina Monova
March 7	Antalya, Turkey; Clay $10,000; Singles and doubles draws	(Germany) Anne Schäfer; 6–3, 6–3	(Ukraine) Anastasiya Vasylyeva	(Slovakia) Vivien Juhászová (Romania) Cristina Dinu	(Austria) Karoline Kurz (Moldova) Anastasia Vdovenco (Russia) Marta Paigina (Austria) Yvonne Neuwirth
March 7	Antalya, Turkey; Clay $10,000; Singles and doubles draws	(Austria) Yvonne Neuwirth (Austria) Nicole Rottmann; 2–6, 6–4, [10–5]	(Romania) Andreea Ghițescu (Romania) Raluca Șerban	(Slovakia) Vivien Juhászová (Romania) Cristina Dinu	(Austria) Karoline Kurz (Moldova) Anastasia Vdovenco (Russia) Marta Paigina (Austria) Yvonne Neuwirth
March 7	Weston, United States; Clay $10,000; Singles and doubles draws	(United States) Katerina Stewart; 3–6, 6–2, 6–1	(South Africa) Chanel Simmonds	(China) Xu Shilin (Croatia) Nina Alibalić	(Norway) Ulrikke Eikeri (United States) Sophie Chang (Switzerland) Tess Sugnaux (Bosnia and Herzegovina) Ema Burgić Bucko
March 7	Weston, United States; Clay $10,000; Singles and doubles draws	(United States) Katerina Stewart (Switzerland) Tess Sugnaux; 7–6^{(7–2)}, 6–3	(Argentina) Julieta Estable (Italy) Jasmine Paolini	(China) Xu Shilin (Croatia) Nina Alibalić	(Norway) Ulrikke Eikeri (United States) Sophie Chang (Switzerland) Tess Sugnaux (Bosnia and Herzegovina) Ema Burgić Bucko
March 14	Canberra, Australia; Clay $25,000; Singles and doubles draws	(Japan) Eri Hozumi; 6–3, 3–6, 7–6^{(7–3)}	(Australia) Destanee Aiava	(Australia) Olivia Tjandramulia (France) Shérazad Reix	(Austria) Pia König (Australia) Naiktha Bains (United Kingdom) Katy Dunne (China) Lu Jiajing
March 14	Canberra, Australia; Clay $25,000; Singles and doubles draws	(Australia) Ashleigh Barty (Australia) Arina Rodionova; 6–4, 6–2	(Japan) Kanae Hisami (Thailand) Varatchaya Wongteanchai	(Australia) Olivia Tjandramulia (France) Shérazad Reix	(Austria) Pia König (Australia) Naiktha Bains (United Kingdom) Katy Dunne (China) Lu Jiajing
March 14	Irapuato, Mexico; Hard $25,000+H; Singles and doubles draws	(Canada) Françoise Abanda; 6–2, 6–4	(Netherlands) Lesley Kerkhove	(United Kingdom) Gabriella Taylor (Bulgaria) Elitsa Kostova	(Mexico) Ana Sofía Sánchez (Russia) Irina Khromacheva (France) Amandine Hesse (United States) Kristie Ahn
March 14	Irapuato, Mexico; Hard $25,000+H; Singles and doubles draws	(Ukraine) Lyudmyla Kichenok (Ukraine) Nadiia Kichenok; 6–1, 6–4	(Japan) Akiko Omae (India) Prarthana Thombare	(United Kingdom) Gabriella Taylor (Bulgaria) Elitsa Kostova	(Mexico) Ana Sofía Sánchez (Russia) Irina Khromacheva (France) Amandine Hesse (United States) Kristie Ahn
March 14	Nanjing, China; Hard $10,000; Singles and doubles draws	(China) Liu Chang; 4–6, 7–6^{(8–6)}, 6–1	(China) You Xiaodi	(South Korea) Kim Na-ri (China) Gai Ao	(China) Zhao Di (China) Tang Haochen (Thailand) Kamonwan Buayam (Thailand) Noppawan Lertcheewakarn
March 14	Nanjing, China; Hard $10,000; Singles and doubles draws	(Netherlands) Chayenne Ewijk (Netherlands) Rosalie van der Hoek; 6–4, 6–2	(Russia) Kseniia Bekker (Belarus) Lidziya Marozava	(South Korea) Kim Na-ri (China) Gai Ao	(China) Zhao Di (China) Tang Haochen (Thailand) Kamonwan Buayam (Thailand) Noppawan Lertcheewakarn
March 14	Sharm el-Sheikh, Egypt; Hard $10,000; Singles and doubles draws	(Germany) Anna Zaja; 6–4, 7–5	(Russia) Anastasiya Komardina	(Russia) Yana Sizikova (Bulgaria) Julia Terziyska	(Switzerland) Karin Kennel (Czech Republic) Karolína Muchová (Russia) Anna Morgina (Estonia) Valeria Gorlats
March 14	Sharm el-Sheikh, Egypt; Hard $10,000; Singles and doubles draws	(Russia) Anastasiya Komardina (Russia) Yana Sizikova; 3–6, 6–3, [10–6]	(Ukraine) Veronika Kapshay (Switzerland) Karin Kennel	(Russia) Yana Sizikova (Bulgaria) Julia Terziyska	(Switzerland) Karin Kennel (Czech Republic) Karolína Muchová (Russia) Anna Morgina (Estonia) Valeria Gorlats
March 14	Gonesse, France; Clay (indoor) $10,000; Singles and doubles draws	(Liechtenstein) Kathinka von Deichmann; 6–3, 3–6, 6–4	(Spain) Olga Sáez Larra	(France) Marine Partaud (Germany) Laura Schaeder	(Germany) Anna Klasen (Italy) Martina Colmegna (Italy) Giorgia Marchetti (France) Joséphine Boualem
March 14	Gonesse, France; Clay (indoor) $10,000; Singles and doubles draws	(France) Marine Partaud (France) Laëtitia Sarrazin; 6–1, 3–6, [10–6]	(Greece) Valentini Grammatikopoulou (Poland) Justyna Jegiołka	(France) Marine Partaud (Germany) Laura Schaeder	(Germany) Anna Klasen (Italy) Martina Colmegna (Italy) Giorgia Marchetti (France) Joséphine Boualem
March 14	Hammamet, Tunisia; Clay $10,000; Singles and doubles draws	(Bulgaria) Isabella Shinikova; 6–1, 4–6, 7–6^{(7–2)}	(Romania) Irina Maria Bara	(Spain) Júlia Payola (North Macedonia) Lina Gjorcheska	(France) Margot Yerolymos (France) Yasmine Mansouri (Serbia) Marina Kačar (Italy) Claudia Giovine
March 14	Hammamet, Tunisia; Clay $10,000; Singles and doubles draws	(Italy) Georgia Brescia (Greece) Despina Papamichail; 4–6, 6–2, [10–7]	(Italy) Alice Balducci (Italy) Claudia Giovine	(Spain) Júlia Payola (North Macedonia) Lina Gjorcheska	(France) Margot Yerolymos (France) Yasmine Mansouri (Serbia) Marina Kačar (Italy) Claudia Giovine
March 14	Antalya, Turkey; Clay $10,000; Singles and doubles draws	(Czech Republic) Markéta Vondroušová; 6–2, 6–0	(Switzerland) Lisa Sabino	(Romania) Cristina Dinu (Ukraine) Anastasiya Vasylyeva	(Russia) Olga Doroshina (Germany) Tayisiya Morderger (Romania) Nicoleta Dascălu (Romania) Andreea Ghițescu
March 14	Antalya, Turkey; Clay $10,000; Singles and doubles draws	(Russia) Olga Doroshina (Ukraine) Anastasiya Vasylyeva; 6–2, 6–1	(Czech Republic) Natálie Novotná (Czech Republic) Markéta Vondroušová	(Romania) Cristina Dinu (Ukraine) Anastasiya Vasylyeva	(Russia) Olga Doroshina (Germany) Tayisiya Morderger (Romania) Nicoleta Dascălu (Romania) Andreea Ghițescu
March 14	Orlando, United States; Clay $10,000; Singles and doubles draws	(United States) Katerina Stewart; 6–4, 6–3	(United States) Grace Min	(United States) Jessica Pegula (Germany) Julia Wachaczyk	(Italy) Jasmine Paolini (Switzerland) Tess Sugnaux (Slovakia) Zuzana Zlochová (United States) Sanaz Marand
March 14	Orlando, United States; Clay $10,000; Singles and doubles draws	(Norway) Ulrikke Eikeri (Netherlands) Quirine Lemoine; 6–1, 6–3	(Bosnia and Herzegovina) Ema Burgić Bucko (Bulgaria) Dia Evtimova	(United States) Jessica Pegula (Germany) Julia Wachaczyk	(Italy) Jasmine Paolini (Switzerland) Tess Sugnaux (Slovakia) Zuzana Zlochová (United States) Sanaz Marand
March 21	Blossom Cup; Quanzhou, China; Hard $50,000; Singles – Doubles	(China) Wang Qiang; 6–2, 6–2	(China) Liu Fangzhou	(Thailand) Luksika Kumkhum (South Korea) Jang Su-jeong	(Belgium) Elise Mertens (China) Liu Chang (China) Zhu Lin (China) Gao Xinyu
March 21	Blossom Cup; Quanzhou, China; Hard $50,000; Singles – Doubles	(Japan) Shuko Aoyama (Japan) Makoto Ninomiya; 6–3, 6–0	(China) Lu Jingjing (China) Zhang Yuxuan	(Thailand) Luksika Kumkhum (South Korea) Jang Su-jeong	(Belgium) Elise Mertens (China) Liu Chang (China) Zhu Lin (China) Gao Xinyu
March 21	Canberra, Australia; Clay $25,000; Singles and doubles draws	(Japan) Miyu Kato; 6–4, 7–6^{(7–3)}	(Hungary) Anna Bondár	(Chinese Taipei) Lee Ya-hsuan (Thailand) Varatchaya Wongteanchai	(Australia) Arina Rodionova (Czech Republic) Barbora Štefková (Germany) Vivian Heisen (China) Lu Jiajing
March 21	Canberra, Australia; Clay $25,000; Singles and doubles draws	(Australia) Ashleigh Barty (Australia) Arina Rodionova; 5–7, 6–3, [10–7]	(Japan) Eri Hozumi (Japan) Miyu Kato	(Chinese Taipei) Lee Ya-hsuan (Thailand) Varatchaya Wongteanchai	(Australia) Arina Rodionova (Czech Republic) Barbora Štefková (Germany) Vivian Heisen (China) Lu Jiajing
March 21	Naples, United States; Clay $25,000; Singles and doubles draws	(Austria) Barbara Haas; 3–6, 6–2, 6–2	(Ukraine) Elizaveta Ianchuk	(Germany) Anne Schäfer (Canada) Sharon Fichman	(Canada) Françoise Abanda (Turkey) İpek Soylu (Netherlands) Lesley Kerkhove (Switzerland) Amra Sadiković
March 21	Naples, United States; Clay $25,000; Singles and doubles draws	(Russia) Valeria Solovyeva (Ukraine) Maryna Zanevska; 7–5, 6–0	(United States) Sophie Chang (Netherlands) Quirine Lemoine	(Germany) Anne Schäfer (Canada) Sharon Fichman	(Canada) Françoise Abanda (Turkey) İpek Soylu (Netherlands) Lesley Kerkhove (Switzerland) Amra Sadiković
March 21	São José do Rio Preto, Brazil; Clay $10,000; Singles and doubles draws	(Brazil) Laura Pigossi; 6–1, 7–5	(Chile) Fernanda Brito	(Argentina) Victoria Bosio (Brazil) Nathaly Kurata	(Chile) Andrea Koch Benvenuto (Argentina) Guadalupe Pérez Rojas (Chile) Bárbara Gatica (Paraguay) Camila Giangreco Campiz
March 21	São José do Rio Preto, Brazil; Clay $10,000; Singles and doubles draws	(Brazil) Carolina Alves (Paraguay) Camila Giangreco Campiz; 6–3, 6–4	(Colombia) María Fernanda Herazo (Bolivia) Noelia Zeballos	(Argentina) Victoria Bosio (Brazil) Nathaly Kurata	(Chile) Andrea Koch Benvenuto (Argentina) Guadalupe Pérez Rojas (Chile) Bárbara Gatica (Paraguay) Camila Giangreco Campiz
March 21	Sharm el-Sheikh, Egypt; Hard $10,000; Singles and doubles draws	(Czech Republic) Karolína Muchová; 6–0, 6–2	(Russia) Anastasiya Komardina	(Slovenia) Nastja Kolar (Russia) Yana Sizikova	(Ukraine) Anastasiya Shoshyna (Romania) Elena-Teodora Cadar (Greece) Despina Papamichail (Ukraine) Veronika Kapshay
March 21	Sharm el-Sheikh, Egypt; Hard $10,000; Singles and doubles draws	(Ukraine) Veronika Kapshay (Ukraine) Anastasiya Shoshyna; 6–1, 6–2	(Switzerland) Karin Kennel (Greece) Despina Papamichail	(Slovenia) Nastja Kolar (Russia) Yana Sizikova	(Ukraine) Anastasiya Shoshyna (Romania) Elena-Teodora Cadar (Greece) Despina Papamichail (Ukraine) Veronika Kapshay
March 21	Le Havre, France; Clay (indoor) $10,000; Singles and doubles draws	(Italy) Martina Di Giuseppe; 6–3, 6–0	(Belgium) Sofie Oyen	(Liechtenstein) Kathinka von Deichmann (Belgium) Elyne Boeykens	(United States) Bernarda Pera (Italy) Martina Colmegna (Italy) Anna Remondina (Spain) Georgina García Pérez
March 21	Le Havre, France; Clay (indoor) $10,000; Singles and doubles draws	(United States) Bernarda Pera (United States) Sabrina Santamaria; 6–2, 6–2	(Spain) Georgina García Pérez (Latvia) Diāna Marcinkēviča	(Liechtenstein) Kathinka von Deichmann (Belgium) Elyne Boeykens	(United States) Bernarda Pera (Italy) Martina Colmegna (Italy) Anna Remondina (Spain) Georgina García Pérez
March 21	Heraklion, Greece; Hard $10,000; Singles and doubles draws	(France) Julie Gervais; 6–3, 7–6^{(7–5)}	(Russia) Polina Vinogradova	(United Kingdom) Amanda Carreras (Russia) Victoria Kan	(Russia) Aleksandra Pospelova (France) Jennifer Zerbone (Denmark) Emilie Francati (Czech Republic) Miriam Kolodziejová
March 21	Heraklion, Greece; Hard $10,000; Singles and doubles draws	(Russia) Aleksandra Pospelova (Russia) Alina Silich; 6–2, 6–2	(United Kingdom) Amanda Carreras (Italy) Alice Savoretti	(United Kingdom) Amanda Carreras (Russia) Victoria Kan	(Russia) Aleksandra Pospelova (France) Jennifer Zerbone (Denmark) Emilie Francati (Czech Republic) Miriam Kolodziejová
March 21	Nishitama, Japan; Hard $10,000; Singles and doubles draws	(Poland) Magdalena Fręch; 7–5, 6–4	(Japan) Mai Minokoshi	(Japan) Erina Hayashi (Chinese Taipei) Hsu Ching-wen	(Japan) Ayano Shimizu (Japan) Miki Miyamura (Japan) Yuuki Tanaka (Chinese Taipei) Lee Pei-chi
March 21	Nishitama, Japan; Hard $10,000; Singles and doubles draws	(Japan) Robu Kajitani (Japan) Mihoki Miyahara; 4–6, 6–2, [10–6]	(Japan) Momoko Kobori (Japan) Chihiro Muramatsu	(Japan) Erina Hayashi (Chinese Taipei) Hsu Ching-wen	(Japan) Ayano Shimizu (Japan) Miki Miyamura (Japan) Yuuki Tanaka (Chinese Taipei) Lee Pei-chi
March 21	Hammamet, Tunisia; Clay $10,000; Singles and doubles draws	(Italy) Claudia Giovine; 6–4, 6–0	(Romania) Elena Gabriela Ruse	(Romania) Irina Maria Bara (Austria) Julia Grabher	(Germany) Katharina Hobgarski (Italy) Martina Spigarelli (Romania) Cristina Adamescu (Spain) Irene Burillo Escorihuela
March 21	Hammamet, Tunisia; Clay $10,000; Singles and doubles draws	(Austria) Julia Grabher (Australia) Isabelle Wallace; 6–1, 6–3	(Italy) Claudia Giovine (India) Snehadevi Reddy	(Romania) Irina Maria Bara (Austria) Julia Grabher	(Germany) Katharina Hobgarski (Italy) Martina Spigarelli (Romania) Cristina Adamescu (Spain) Irene Burillo Escorihuela
March 21	Antalya, Turkey; Hard $10,000; Singles and doubles draws	(France) Caroline Roméo; 6–3, 6–1	(Russia) Aminat Kushkhova	(Colombia) Yuliana Lizarazo (Slovakia) Michaela Hončová	(Slovakia) Viktória Kužmová (Belgium) Kimberley Zimmermann (Slovakia) Natália Vajdová (Slovakia) Vivien Juhászová
March 21	Antalya, Turkey; Hard $10,000; Singles and doubles draws	(Hungary) Ágnes Bukta (Slovakia) Vivien Juhászová; 6–4, 6–1	(Slovakia) Michaela Hončová (Slovakia) Chantal Škamlová	(Colombia) Yuliana Lizarazo (Slovakia) Michaela Hončová	(Slovakia) Viktória Kužmová (Belgium) Kimberley Zimmermann (Slovakia) Natália Vajdová (Slovakia) Vivien Juhászová
March 28	Engie Open de Seine-et-Marne; Croissy-Beaubourg, France; Hard (indoor) $50,000; Singles – Doubles	(Serbia) Ivana Jorović; 6–1, 4–6, 6–4	(France) Pauline Parmentier	(France) Océane Dodin (Romania) Sorana Cîrstea	(Russia) Alexandra Panova (Switzerland) Stefanie Vögele (Romania) Andreea Mitu (Tunisia) Ons Jabeur
March 28	Engie Open de Seine-et-Marne; Croissy-Beaubourg, France; Hard (indoor) $50,000; Singles – Doubles	(United Kingdom) Jocelyn Rae (United Kingdom) Anna Smith; 6–4, 6–1	(Czech Republic) Lenka Kunčíková (Czech Republic) Karolína Stuchlá	(France) Océane Dodin (Romania) Sorana Cîrstea	(Russia) Alexandra Panova (Switzerland) Stefanie Vögele (Romania) Andreea Mitu (Tunisia) Ons Jabeur
March 28	Wilde Lexus Women's USTA Pro Circuit Event; Osprey, United States; Clay $50,000; Singles – Doubles	(United States) Madison Brengle; 4–6, 6–4, 6–3	(Spain) Lara Arruabarrena	(Sweden) Rebecca Peterson (Greece) Maria Sakkari	(United States) Samantha Crawford (Latvia) Anastasija Sevastova (Germany) Tatjana Maria (Germany) Anne Schäfer
March 28	Wilde Lexus Women's USTA Pro Circuit Event; Osprey, United States; Clay $50,000; Singles – Doubles	(United States) Asia Muhammad (United States) Taylor Townsend; 6–1, 6–7^{(5–7)}, [10–4]	(United States) Louisa Chirico (United States) Katerina Stewart	(Sweden) Rebecca Peterson (Greece) Maria Sakkari	(United States) Samantha Crawford (Latvia) Anastasija Sevastova (Germany) Tatjana Maria (Germany) Anne Schäfer
March 28	Kōfu International Open; Kōfu, Japan; Hard $25,000; Singles and doubles draws	(Sweden) Susanne Celik; 7–6^{(7–3)}, 6–3	(China) Zhu Lin	(China) Zhang Yuxuan (Chinese Taipei) Lee Ya-hsuan	(Japan) Eri Hozumi (South Korea) Han Na-lae (Japan) Misa Eguchi (Czech Republic) Barbora Krejčíková
March 28	Kōfu International Open; Kōfu, Japan; Hard $25,000; Singles and doubles draws	(Japan) Shuko Aoyama (Japan) Erina Hayashi; 7–5, 7–5	(Japan) Kanae Hisami (Japan) Kotomi Takahata	(China) Zhang Yuxuan (Chinese Taipei) Lee Ya-hsuan	(Japan) Eri Hozumi (South Korea) Han Na-lae (Japan) Misa Eguchi (Czech Republic) Barbora Krejčíková
March 28	Manama, Bahrain; Hard $10,000; Singles and doubles draws	(Slovakia) Tereza Mihalíková; 7–5, 6–1	(Russia) Anna Kalinskaya	(Philippines) Katharina Lehnert (India) Prerna Bhambri	(China) Lu Jiajing (Kazakhstan) Kamila Kerimbayeva (Germany) Vivian Heisen (Oman) Fatma Al-Nabhani
March 28	Manama, Bahrain; Hard $10,000; Singles and doubles draws	(Russia) Anna Kalinskaya (Slovakia) Tereza Mihalíková; 7–5, 6–3	(Germany) Katharina Hering (Belgium) Kimberley Zimmermann	(Philippines) Katharina Lehnert (India) Prerna Bhambri	(China) Lu Jiajing (Kazakhstan) Kamila Kerimbayeva (Germany) Vivian Heisen (Oman) Fatma Al-Nabhani
March 28	São José dos Campos, Brazil; Clay $10,000; Singles and doubles draws	(Argentina) Nadia Podoroska; 7–6^{(7–2)}, 6–1	(Brazil) Gabriela Cé	(Argentina) Guadalupe Pérez Rojas (Brazil) Nathaly Kurata	(Argentina) Constanza Vega (Paraguay) Camila Giangreco Campiz (Chile) Fernanda Brito (Brazil) Nathália Rossi
March 28	São José dos Campos, Brazil; Clay $10,000; Singles and doubles draws	(Paraguay) Camila Giangreco Campiz (Argentina) Constanza Vega; 6–7^{(5–7)}, 7–6^{(7–5)}, [10–8]	(Argentina) Guadalupe Pérez Rojas (Argentina) Nadia Podoroska	(Argentina) Guadalupe Pérez Rojas (Brazil) Nathaly Kurata	(Argentina) Constanza Vega (Paraguay) Camila Giangreco Campiz (Chile) Fernanda Brito (Brazil) Nathália Rossi
March 28	Sharm el-Sheikh, Egypt; Hard $10,000; Singles and doubles draws	(Georgia (country)) Mariam Bolkvadze; 6–3, 7–5	(Russia) Sofya Zhuk	(Russia) Margarita Skryabina (Greece) Despina Papamichail	(Slovenia) Nastja Kolar (Sweden) Brenda Njuki (France) Victoria Muntean (Serbia) Tamara Čurović
March 28	Sharm el-Sheikh, Egypt; Hard $10,000; Singles and doubles draws	(Georgia (country)) Mariam Bolkvadze (Slovenia) Nastja Kolar; 7–6^{(7–0)}, 7–5	(Ukraine) Oleksandra Korashvili (Russia) Margarita Lazareva	(Russia) Margarita Skryabina (Greece) Despina Papamichail	(Slovenia) Nastja Kolar (Sweden) Brenda Njuki (France) Victoria Muntean (Serbia) Tamara Čurović
March 28	Heraklion, Greece; Hard $10,000; Singles and doubles draws	(Russia) Aleksandra Pospelova; 6–1, 6–4	(Germany) Laura Schaeder	(Ukraine) Alyona Sotnikova (France) Julie Gervais	(Belgium) Klaartje Liebens (Russia) Victoria Kan (United Kingdom) Amanda Carreras (Romania) Oana Georgeta Simion
March 28	Heraklion, Greece; Hard $10,000; Singles and doubles draws	(Russia) Aleksandra Pospelova (Russia) Alina Silich; 6–3, 6–4	(Italy) Deborah Chiesa (Croatia) Adrijana Lekaj	(Ukraine) Alyona Sotnikova (France) Julie Gervais	(Belgium) Klaartje Liebens (Russia) Victoria Kan (United Kingdom) Amanda Carreras (Romania) Oana Georgeta Simion
March 28	Torneo Internacional Challenger León; León, Mexico; Hard $10,000; Singles and doubles draws	(Mexico) Renata Zarazúa; 2–6, 6–3, 6–2	(Mexico) Ana Sofía Sánchez	(Mexico) Nazari Urbina (South Africa) Chanel Simmonds	(Mexico) Victoria Rodríguez (United States) Alexandra Morozova (United Kingdom) Gabriella Taylor (United States) Zoë Gwen Scandalis
March 28	Torneo Internacional Challenger León; León, Mexico; Hard $10,000; Singles and doubles draws	(South Africa) Chanel Simmonds (Mexico) Renata Zarazúa; 6–0, 6–2	(Mexico) Sabastiani León (Mexico) Nazari Urbina	(Mexico) Nazari Urbina (South Africa) Chanel Simmonds	(Mexico) Victoria Rodríguez (United States) Alexandra Morozova (United Kingdom) Gabriella Taylor (United States) Zoë Gwen Scandalis
March 28	Hammamet, Tunisia; Clay $10,000; Singles and doubles draws	(Romania) Elena Gabriela Ruse; 6–4, 6–1	(Austria) Julia Grabher	(Germany) Katharina Hobgarski (Italy) Corinna Dentoni	(Bulgaria) Dia Evtimova (Italy) Gaia Sanesi (Slovenia) Pia Čuk (Russia) Ksenija Sharifova
March 28	Hammamet, Tunisia; Clay $10,000; Singles and doubles draws	(Germany) Katharina Hobgarski (Romania) Elena Gabriela Ruse; 6–4, 6–4	(Egypt) Ola Abou Zekry (India) Snehadevi Reddy	(Germany) Katharina Hobgarski (Italy) Corinna Dentoni	(Bulgaria) Dia Evtimova (Italy) Gaia Sanesi (Slovenia) Pia Čuk (Russia) Ksenija Sharifova
March 28	Antalya, Turkey; Hard $10,000; Singles and doubles draws	(Bulgaria) Viktoriya Tomova; 6–0, 6–4	(France) Caroline Roméo	(Slovakia) Michaela Hončová (Ukraine) Anastasiya Vasylyeva	(United Kingdom) Harriet Dart (Slovakia) Viktória Kužmová (Spain) Yvonne Cavallé Reimers (Turkey) Ayla Aksu
March 28	Antalya, Turkey; Hard $10,000; Singles and doubles draws	(Turkey) Ayla Aksu (Turkey) Melis Sezer; 6–3, 6–3	(Bulgaria) Viktoriya Tomova (Ukraine) Anastasiya Vasylyeva	(Slovakia) Michaela Hončová (Ukraine) Anastasiya Vasylyeva	(United Kingdom) Harriet Dart (Slovakia) Viktória Kužmová (Spain) Yvonne Cavallé Reimers (Turkey) Ayla Aksu
