= 2015 ITF Women's Circuit UBS Thurgau – Singles =

Singles
- 2015 ITF Women's Circuit UBS Thurgau

Final
- Champion: (Belarus) Olga Govortsova
- Runner-up: (Slovakia) Rebecca Šramková
- Score: 6–2, 6–1

Events
Singles	Doubles
← 2014 ·	ITF Women's Circuit UBS Thurgau	· 2016 →

Michaëlla Krajicek was the defending champion, however she chose to participate in Dubai instead.

Olga Govortsova won the title, defeating Rebecca Šramková in the final, 6–2, 6–1.

== Seeds ==
1. (Czech Republic) Denisa Allertová (first round)
2. (Germany) Anna-Lena Friedsam (second round)
3. (Switzerland) Romina Oprandi (quarterfinals, retired)
4. (Tunisia) Ons Jabeur (second round)
5. (Austria) ~~Tamira Paszek~~ (withdrew)
6. (Czech Republic) Kristýna Plíšková (semifinals)
7. (Germany) Laura Siegemund (second round)
8. (Belarus) Olga Govortsova (champion)

== Main draw ==
=== Key ===
- Q = Qualifier
- WC = Wild card
- LL = Lucky loser
- Alt = Alternate
- SE = Special exempt
- PR = Protected ranking
- ITF = ITF entry
- JE = Junior exempt
- w/o = Walkover
- r = Retired
- d = Defaulted
- SR = Special ranking

=== Finals ===
Semifinals
6	(Czech Republic) Kristýna Plíšková	0	6	3
8	(Belarus) Olga Govortsova	6	3	6
Q	(Slovakia) Rebecca Šramková	7^{7}	7^{9}
(Latvia) Jeļena Ostapenko	6^{2}	6^{7}

Final
8	(Belarus) Olga Govortsova	6	6
Q	(Slovakia) Rebecca Šramková	2	1

=== Top half ===
First round
1	(Czech Republic) D Allertová	4	1
(Serbia) V Dolonc	6	6
(Switzerland) V Golubic	6	3	6
(Italy) A Brianti	4	6	1
(Poland) P Kania	6	6
WC	(Switzerland) N Stadler	2	2
Q	(United Kingdom) T Moore	5	3
6	(Czech Republic) Kr Plíšková	7	6
3	(Switzerland) R Oprandi	6	3	6
(Ukraine) L Kichenok	4	6	2
(France) S Foretz	7	6
WC	(Switzerland) J Teichmann	5	1
WC	(Switzerland) K Kennel	6	2	3
WC	(Switzerland) T Sugnaux	4	6	6
(Switzerland) X Knoll	2	6	6^{9}
8	(Belarus) O Govortsova	6	4	7^{11}

Second round
(Serbia) V Dolonc	6	1	6
(Switzerland) V Golubic	1	6	4
(Poland) P Kania	4	2
6	(Czech Republic) Kr Plíšková	6	6
3	(Switzerland) R Oprandi	6	0	7
(France) S Foretz	1	6	5
WC	(Switzerland) T Sugnaux	2	2
8	(Belarus) O Govortsova	6	6

Quarterfinals
(Serbia) V Dolonc	1	3
6	(Czech Republic) Kr Plíšková	6	6
3	(Switzerland) R Oprandi	3	0^{r}
8	(Belarus) O Govortsova	6	1

Semifinals
6	(Czech Republic) Kr Plíšková	0	6	3
8	(Belarus) O Govortsova	6	3	6

=== Bottom half ===
First round
7	(Germany) L Siegemund	6	6
PR	(Germany) K Wörle-Scheller	1	1
(Czech Republic) A Hlaváčková	6	6
(Liechtenstein) K von Deichmann	4	2
(Russia) M Sirotkina	3	6^{6}
Q	(Slovakia) R Šramková	6	7^{7}
(Russia) M Melnikova	6	2	4
4	(Tunisia) O Jabeur	3	6	6
LL	(Poland) J Jegiołka	6	6
Q	(Czech Republic) J Malečková	2	2
(France) I Ramialison	1	3
(Latvia) J Ostapenko	6	6
Q	(Germany) T Morderger	4	6	2
(Russia) E Alexandrova	6	0	6
(Ukraine) N Kichenok	6^{7}	7^{7}	3
2	(Germany) A-L Friedsam	7^{9}	6^{5}	6

Second round
7	(Germany) L Siegemund	6^{5}	2
(Czech Republic) A Hlaváčková	7^{7}	6
Q	(Slovakia) R Šramková	6^{4}	6	6
4	(Tunisia) O Jabeur	7^{7}	4	1
LL	(Poland) J Jegiołka	1	2
(Latvia) J Ostapenko	6	6
(Russia) E Alexandrova	6	6
2	(Germany) A-L Friedsam	4	3

Quarterfinals
(Czech Republic) A Hlaváčková	3	5
Q	(Slovakia) R Šramková	6	7
(Latvia) J Ostapenko	6	6
(Russia) E Alexandrova	3	3

Semifinals
Q	(Slovakia) R Šramková	7^{7}	7^{9}
(Latvia) J Ostapenko	6^{2}	6^{7}
