= 2015 ITF Women's Circuit UBS Thurgau – Doubles =

Doubles
- 2015 ITF Women's Circuit UBS Thurgau

Final
- Champions: (Ukraine) Lyudmyla Kichenok (Ukraine) Nadiia Kichenok
- Runners-up: (France) Stéphanie Foretz (France) Irina Ramialison
- Score: 6–3, 6–3

Events
Singles	Doubles
← 2014 ·	ITF Women's Circuit UBS Thurgau	· 2016 →

Eva Birnerová and Michaëlla Krajicek were the defending champions, however both players chose not to participate.

Twin-sisters Lyudmyla and Nadiia Kichenok won the title, defeating French-duo Stéphanie Foretz and Irina Ramialison in the final, 6–3, 6–3.

== Seeds ==
1. (Ukraine) Lyudmyla Kichenok / (Ukraine) Nadiia Kichenok (champions)
2. (Poland) Paula Kania / (Germany) Laura Siegemund (first round)
3. (Belarus) Olga Govortsova / (Switzerland) Romina Oprandi (first round)
4. (Switzerland) Xenia Knoll / (Russia) Marina Melnikova (first round)

== Draw ==
=== Key ===
- Q = Qualifier
- WC = Wild card
- LL = Lucky loser
- Alt = Alternate
- SE = Special exempt
- PR = Protected ranking
- ITF = ITF entry
- JE = Junior exempt
- w/o = Walkover
- r = Retired
- d = Defaulted
- SR = Special ranking

First round
1	(Ukraine) L Kichenok (Ukraine) N Kichenok	6	6
(Croatia) S Njirić (Italy) C Rosatello	4	2
(Poland) J Jegiołka (Switzerland) J Teichmann	6^{4}	6	[10]
(Germany) T Morderger (Germany) Y Morderger	7^{7}	4	[4]
3	(Belarus) O Govortsova (Switzerland) R Oprandi	6	3	[7]
(Switzerland) N Stadler (Netherlands) R van der Hoek	2	6	[10]
(Switzerland) M Gämperle (Switzerland) V Zemp	1	1
(Italy) A Matteucci (Netherlands) D Schuurs	6	6
(France) S Foretz (France) I Ramialison	6	7^{7}
(Switzerland) V Golubic (Czech Republic) P Krejsová	1	6^{4}
(Czech Republic) L Kunčíková (Czech Republic) K Stuchlá	6	6
4	(Switzerland) X Knoll (Russia) M Melnikova	3	4
(United Kingdom) T Moore (Russia) M Sirotkina	7	6
(Germany) A-L Friedsam (Switzerland) K Kennel	5	3
(Serbia) V Dolonc (Latvia) J Ostapenko	1	6	[10]
2	(Poland) P Kania (Germany) L Siegemund	6	4	[6]

Quarterfinals
1	(Ukraine) L Kichenok (Ukraine) N Kichenok	6	7^{8}
(Poland) J Jegiołka (Switzerland) J Teichmann	2	6^{6}
(Switzerland) N Stadler (Netherlands) R van der Hoek	4	4
(Italy) A Matteucci (Netherlands) D Schuurs	6	6
(France) S Foretz (France) I Ramialison	6	6
(Czech Republic) L Kunčíková (Czech Republic) K Stuchlá	4	2
(United Kingdom) T Moore (Russia) M Sirotkina
(Serbia) V Dolonc (Latvia) J Ostapenko	w/o

Semifinals
1	(Ukraine) L Kichenok (Ukraine) N Kichenok	6	6
(Italy) A Matteucci (Netherlands) D Schuurs	4	2
(France) S Foretz (France) I Ramialison	6	4	[10]
(Serbia) V Dolonc (Latvia) J Ostapenko	4	6	[6]

Final
1	(Ukraine) L Kichenok (Ukraine) N Kichenok	6	6
(France) S Foretz (France) I Ramialison	3	3
