= 2015 ITF Women's Circuit UBS Thurgau =

- Date: 16–22 February
- Edition: 3rd
- Category: ITF Women's Circuit
- Prize money: $50,000
- Surface: Carpet (indoor)
- Location: Kreuzlingen, Switzerland
- Venue: Tennishalle am See AG

Champions

Singles
- (Belarus) Olga Govortsova

Doubles
- (Ukraine) Lyudmyla Kichenok / (Ukraine) Nadiia Kichenok
← 2014 ·	ITF Women's Circuit UBS Thurgau	· 2016 →

The 2015 ITF Women's Circuit UBS Thurgau was a professional tennis tournament played on indoor carpet courts. It was the third edition of the tournament which was part of the 2015 ITF Women's Circuit, and offered a total of $50,000 in prize money. It took place in Kreuzlingen, Switzerland, on 16–22 February 2015.

== Women's singles entrants ==
=== Seeds ===
Country	Player	Rank^{1}	Seed
CZE	Denisa Allertová	91	1
GER	Anna-Lena Friedsam	97	2
SUI	Romina Oprandi	112	3
TUN	Ons Jabeur	128	4
~~AUT~~	~~Tamira Paszek~~	~~138~~	~~5~~
CZE	Kristýna Plíšková	144	6
GER	Laura Siegemund	153	7
BLR	Olga Govortsova	157	8

- ^{1} Rankings as of 9 February 2015

=== Other entrants ===
The following players received wildcards into the singles main draw:

- (Switzerland) Karin Kennel
- (Switzerland) Nina Stadler
- (Switzerland) Tess Sugnaux
- (Switzerland) Jil Teichmann

The following players received entry from the qualifying draw:

- (Czech Republic) Jesika Malečková
- (United Kingdom) Tara Moore
- (Slovakia) Rebecca Šramková
- (Germany) Tayisiya Morderger

The following player received entry by a lucky loser spot:

- (Poland) Justyna Jegiołka

The following player received entry by a protected ranking:

- (Germany) Kathrin Wörle-Scheller

== Champions ==
=== Singles ===
- (Belarus) Olga Govortsova def. (Slovakia) Rebecca Šramková, 6–2, 6–1

=== Doubles ===
- (Ukraine) Lyudmyla Kichenok / (Ukraine) Nadiia Kichenok def. (France) Stéphanie Foretz / (France) Irina Ramialison, 6–3, 6–3
