= 2016 ITF Women's Circuit UBS Thurgau – Singles =

Singles
- 2016 ITF Women's Circuit UBS Thurgau

Final
- Champion: (Czech Republic) Kristýna Plíšková
- Runner-up: (Switzerland) Amra Sadiković
- Score: 7–6^{(7–4)}, 7–6^{(7–3)}

Events
Singles	Doubles
← 2015 ·	ITF Women's Circuit UBS Thurgau	· 2017 →

Olga Govortsova was the defending champion, but she chose to participate in Acapulco instead.

Kristýna Plíšková won the title, defeating Amra Sadiković in the final, 7–6^{(7–4)}, 7–6^{(7–3)}.

== Seeds ==
1. (Germany) Carina Witthöft (second round)
2. (Czech Republic) Kristýna Plíšková (champion)
3. (Austria) Tamira Paszek (second round)
4. (Ukraine) Kateryna Kozlova (semifinals)
5. (Czech Republic) Tereza Smitková (first round)
6. (France) Amandine Hesse (second round)
7. (Belgium) Ysaline Bonaventure (second round)
8. (France) Océane Dodin (quarterfinals)

== Main draw ==
=== Key ===
- Q = Qualifier
- WC = Wild card
- LL = Lucky loser
- Alt = Alternate
- SE = Special exempt
- PR = Protected ranking
- ITF = ITF entry
- JE = Junior exempt
- w/o = Walkover
- r = Retired
- d = Defaulted
- SR = Special ranking

=== Finals ===
Semifinals
(Russia) Ekaterina Alexandrova	7	3	6^{3}
(Switzerland) Amra Sadiković	5	6	7^{7}
4	(Ukraine) Kateryna Kozlova	2	4
2	(Czech Republic) Kristýna Plíšková	6	6

Final
(Switzerland) Amra Sadiković	6^{4}	6^{3}
2	(Czech Republic) Kristýna Plíšková	7^{7}	7^{7}

=== Top half ===
First round
1	(Germany) C Witthöft	6	7^{7}
(Czech Republic) N Vaidišová	1	6^{5}
(Czech Republic) J Malečková	4	4
(Russia) E Alexandrova	6	6
JE	(Hungary) D Gálfi	4	4
(United States) B Pera	6	6
(France) I Ramialison	4	2
8	(France) O Dodin	6	6
3	(Austria) T Paszek	7^{7}	2	6
Q	(Slovakia) R Šramková	6^{2}	6	2
(Switzerland) A Sadiković	6	6
Q	(Germany) A Zaja	3	4
(Serbia) I Jorović	6	6
(Slovenia) D Jakupović	3	3
Q	(Italy) C Ferrando	3	3
7	(Belgium) Y Bonaventure	6	6

Second round
1	(Germany) C Witthöft	4	7^{7}	6^{5}
(Russia) E Alexandrova	6	6^{3}	7^{7}
(United States) B Pera	3	2
8	(France) O Dodin	6	6
3	(Austria) T Paszek	3	5
(Switzerland) A Sadiković	6	7
(Serbia) I Jorović	6	0
7	(Belgium) Y Bonaventure	3	0^{r}

Quarterfinals
(Russia) E Alexandrova	5	6	6
8	(France) O Dodin	7	4	3
(Switzerland) A Sadiković	6	3	7^{9}
(Serbia) I Jorović	4	6	6^{7}

Semifinals
(Russia) E Alexandrova	7	3	6^{3}
(Switzerland) A Sadiković	5	6	7^{7}

=== Bottom half ===
First round
6	(France) A Hesse	6	2	7
WC	(Liechtenstein) K von Deichmann	3	6	5
WC	(Switzerland) N Stadler	3	0
(Belgium) M Benoît	6	6
PR	(France) C Feuerstein	6	4	7
(Czech Republic) K Vaňková	4	6	5
(France) V Razzano	6	2	1^{r}
4	(Ukraine) K Kozlova	1	6	4
5	(Czech Republic) T Smitková	3	4
Q	(Italy) G Barbieri	6	6
WC	(Switzerland) X Knoll	1	4
(Croatia) T Lukas	6	6
(Germany) A Lottner	4	2
WC	(Switzerland) R Masarova	6	6
(Netherlands) L Kerkhove	3	4
2	(Czech Republic) Kr Plíšková	6	6

Second round
6	(France) A Hesse	2	0
(Belgium) M Benoît	6	6
PR	(France) C Feuerstein	5	4
4	(Ukraine) K Kozlova	7	6
Q	(Italy) G Barbieri	6	6
(Croatia) T Lukas	4	2
WC	(Switzerland) R Masarova	4	0
2	(Czech Republic) Kr Plíšková	6	6

Quarterfinals
(Belgium) M Benoît	2	2
4	(Ukraine) K Kozlova	6	6
Q	(Italy) G Barbieri	4	2
2	(Czech Republic) Kr Plíšková	6	6

Semifinals
4	(Ukraine) K Kozlova	2	4
2	(Czech Republic) Kr Plíšková	6	6
