= 2016 ITF Women's Circuit UBS Thurgau – Doubles =

Doubles
- 2016 ITF Women's Circuit UBS Thurgau

Final
- Champions: (Germany) Antonia Lottner (Switzerland) Amra Sadiković
- Runners-up: (Croatia) Tena Lukas (United States) Bernarda Pera
- Score: 5–7, 6–2, [10–5]

Events
Singles	Doubles
← 2015 ·	ITF Women's Circuit UBS Thurgau	· 2017 →

Lyudmyla and Nadiia Kichenok were the defending champions, but they chose to participate in Doha instead.

Antonia Lottner and Amra Sadiković won the title, defeating Tena Lukas and Bernarda Pera in the final, 5–7, 6–2, [10–5].

== Seeds ==
1. (Belgium) Ysaline Bonaventure / (Switzerland) Xenia Knoll (first round)
2. (Germany) ~~Carolin Daniels~~ / (Austria) ~~Sandra Klemenschits~~ (withdrew)
3. (Netherlands) Lesley Kerkhove / (Sweden) Cornelia Lister (first round)
4. (Argentina) Tatiana Búa / (France) Irina Ramialison (quarterfinals)

== Draw ==
=== Key ===
- Q = Qualifier
- WC = Wild card
- LL = Lucky loser
- Alt = Alternate
- SE = Special exempt
- PR = Protected ranking
- ITF = ITF entry
- JE = Junior exempt
- w/o = Walkover
- r = Retired
- d = Defaulted
- SR = Special ranking

First round
1	(Belgium) Y Bonaventure (Switzerland) X Knoll	6^{5}	1
(Austria) T Paszek (Germany) C Witthöft	7^{7}	6
(Czech Republic) J Malečková (Czech Republic) T Smitková	5	6	[6]
(Germany) A Lottner (Switzerland) A Sadiković	7	2	[10]
4	(Argentina) T Búa (France) I Ramialison	6	1	[10]
(Belgium) M Benoît (Germany) K Hering	3	6	[8]
WC	(Switzerland) J Crivelletto (Switzerland) C Frapolli	6	3	[6]
(Germany) N Geuer (Germany) A Zaja	4	6	[10]
(Switzerland) N Stadler (Belgium) K Zimmermann	4	6^{5}
(Slovenia) D Jakupović (Czech Republic) K Vaňková	6	7^{7}
(Hungary) D Gálfi (Germany) A Klasen	6	6
3	(Netherlands) L Kerkhove (Sweden) C Lister	4	3
(Poland) J Jegiołka (Latvia) D Marcinkēviča	6	6
WC	(Switzerland) L Küng (Switzerland) S Waltert	4	1
WC	(Switzerland) C Grimm (Switzerland) D Vukovic	3	6	[7]
Alt	(Croatia) T Lukas (United States) B Pera	6	3	[10]

Quarterfinals
(Austria) T Paszek (Germany) C Witthöft	6	1	[3]
(Germany) A Lottner (Switzerland) A Sadiković	3	6	[10]
4	(Argentina) T Búa (France) I Ramialison	3	3
(Germany) N Geuer (Germany) A Zaja	6	6
(Slovenia) D Jakupović (Czech Republic) K Vaňková	6	6
(Hungary) D Gálfi (Germany) A Klasen	4	3
(Poland) J Jegiołka (Latvia) D Marcinkēviča	4	4
Alt	(Croatia) T Lukas (United States) B Pera	6	6

Semifinals
(Germany) A Lottner (Switzerland) A Sadiković	6	6
(Germany) N Geuer (Germany) A Zaja	3	1
(Slovenia) D Jakupović (Czech Republic) K Vaňková	6	4	[4]
Alt	(Croatia) T Lukas (United States) B Pera	4	6	[10]

Final
(Germany) A Lottner (Switzerland) A Sadiković	5	6	[10]
Alt	(Croatia) T Lukas (United States) B Pera	7	2	[5]
