= 2016 ITF Women's Circuit UBS Thurgau =

- Date: 22–28 February
- Edition: 4th
- Category: ITF Women's Circuit
- Prize money: $50,000
- Surface: Carpet / Indoor
- Location: Kreuzlingen, Switzerland

Champions

Singles
- (Czech Republic) Kristýna Plíšková

Doubles
- (Germany) Antonia Lottner / (Switzerland) Amra Sadiković
← 2015 ·	ITF Women's Circuit UBS Thurgau	· 2017 →

The 2016 ITF Women's Circuit UBS Thurgau was a professional tennis tournament played on indoor carpet courts. It was the fourth edition of the tournament and part of the 2016 ITF Women's Circuit, offering a total of $50,000 in prize money. It took place in Kreuzlingen, Switzerland, on 22–28 February 2016.

== Singles main-draw entrants ==
=== Seeds ===
Country	Player	Rank^{1}	Seed
GER	Carina Witthöft	70	1
CZE	Kristýna Plíšková	107	2
AUT	Tamira Paszek	120	3
UKR	Kateryna Kozlova	138	4
CZE	Tereza Smitková	144	5
FRA	Amandine Hesse	157	6
BEL	Ysaline Bonaventure	163	7
FRA	Océane Dodin	164	8

- ^{1} Rankings as of 15 February 2016.

=== Other entrants ===
The following players received wildcards into the singles main draw:

- (Liechtenstein) Kathinka von Deichmann
- (Switzerland) Xenia Knoll
- (Switzerland) Rebeka Masarova
- (Switzerland) Nina Stadler

The following players received entry from the qualifying draw:

- (Italy) Gioia Barbieri
- (Italy) Cristiana Ferrando
- (Slovakia) Rebecca Šramková
- (Germany) Anna Zaja

The following player received entry by a protected ranking:

- (France) Claire Feuerstein

The following player received entry by a junior exempt:

- (Hungary) Dalma Gálfi

== Champions ==
=== Singles ===
- (Czech Republic) Kristýna Plíšková def. (Switzerland) Amra Sadiković, 7–6^{(7–4)}, 7–6^{(7–3)}

=== Doubles ===
- (Germany) Antonia Lottner / (Switzerland) Amra Sadiković def. (Croatia) Tena Lukas / (United States) Bernarda Pera, 5–7, 6–2, [10–5]
