= Karin Kennel =

Swiss tennis player

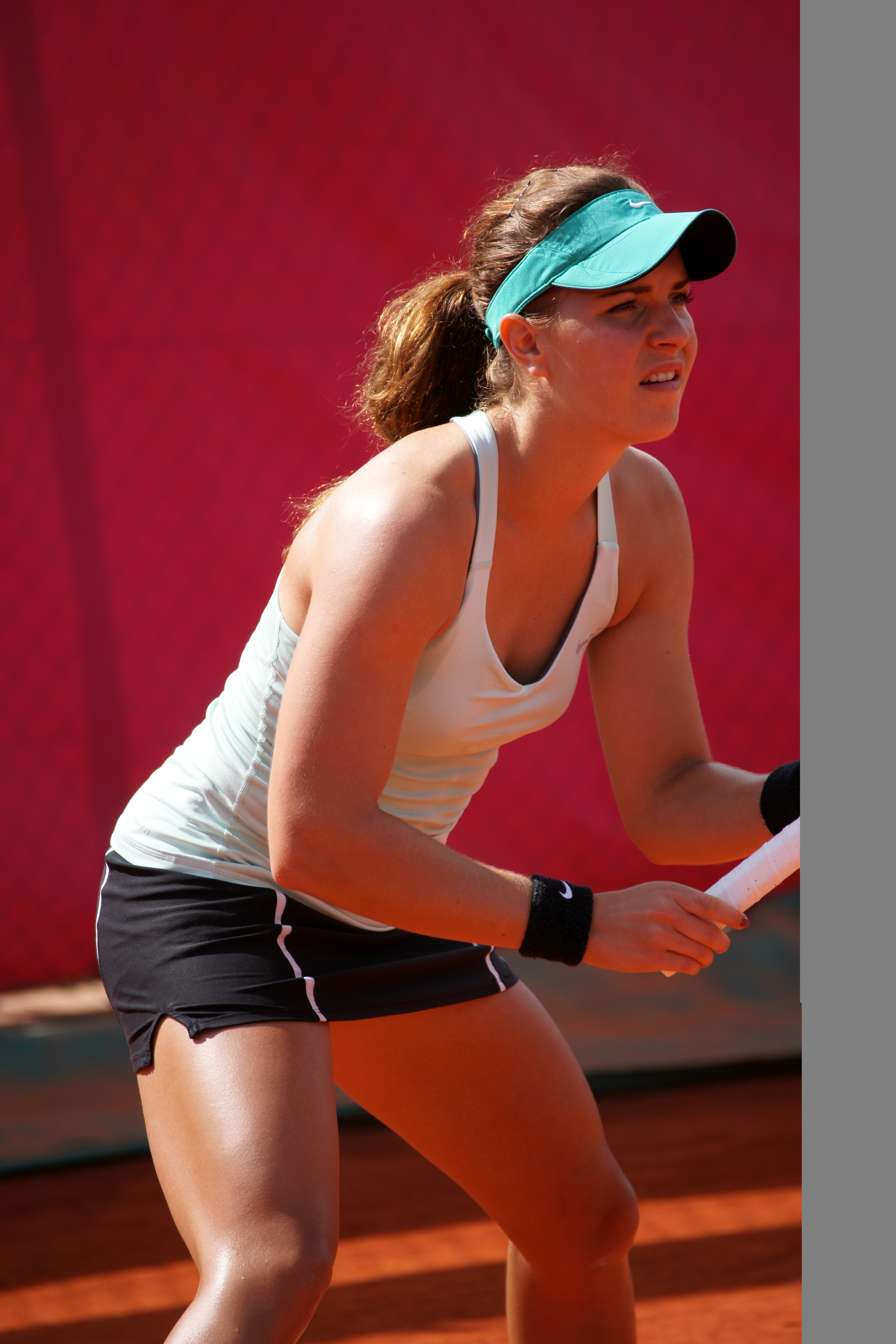
- Karin at Cagnes-sur-Mer, 2015
- Country (sports): Switzerland
- Born: 5 July 1995 (age 29)
- Plays: Right-handed
- Prize money: US$ 71,632

Singles
- Career record: 233–160
- Career titles: 4 ITF
- Highest ranking: No. 409 (7 April 2014)

Doubles
- Career record: 136–80
- Career titles: 10 ITF
- Highest ranking: No. 307 (30 July 2018)

Karin Kennel (born 5 July 1995) is a Swiss former tennis player. On 7 April 2014, she achieved her highest singles ranking of 409 by the WTA. On 30 July 2018, she peaked at No. 307 in the doubles rankings.

== Career ==
Chala had a successful junior career; her career-high world ranking as a junior was world No. 10. In 2013, Kennel partnering Belgian Elise Mertens, won a prestigious tournament for juniors, the Abierto Juvenil Mexicano (Grade A) In 2012, she reached the final of the Osaka Mayor's Cup in Japan.

In 2013, she lost the final of the European Junior Championships to Czech player Barbora Krejčíková.

== ITF Junior results ==
Legend (Win/Loss)
Category GA
Category G1
Category G2
Category G3
Category G4
Category G5

=== Singles (3–5) ===
Result	No.	Date	Location	Grade	Surface	Opponent	Score
Loss	1.	February 2011	Oberentfelden, Switzerland	G4	Carpet (i)	Corina Jaeger	6–7, 6–2, 6–7
Win	2.	July 2011	Oberentfelden, Switzerland	G4	Clay	Imane Maëlle Kocher	6–3, 6–0
Win	3.	September 2011	Luzern, Switzerland	G5	Clay	Jil Teichmann	6–0, 6–0
Win	4.	October 2011	Perak, Malaysia	G4	Hard	Pippa Horn	6–2, 6–1
Loss	5.	October 2011	Sarawak, Malaysia	G3	Hard	Pippa Horn	4–6, 2–6
Loss	6.	July 2012	Castricum, Netherlands	G2	Clay	Fiona Ferro	6–4, 1–6, 4–6
Loss	7.	October 2012	Osaka Mayor's Cup, Japan	GA	Hard	Kateřina Siniaková	4–6, 4–6
Loss	8.	July 2013	Klosters, Switzerland	GB1	Clay	Barbora Krejčíková	2–6, 4–6

=== Doubles (3–4) ===
Result	No.	Date	Location	Grade	Surface	Partner	Opponents	Score
Win	1.	July 2011	Oberentfelden, Switzerland	G4	Clay	Imane Maëlle Kocher	Nina Stadler Jil Teichmann	6–2, 6–4
Loss	2.	October 2011	Perak, Malaysia	G3	Hard	Katie Boulter	Kamonwan Buayam Aldila Sutjiadi	3–6, 2–6
Win	3.	November 2011	Merida, Mexico	G1	Hard	Megane Bianco	Gabrielle Andrews Irina Khromacheva	w/o
Loss	4.	March 2012	Potchefstroom, South Africa	G2	Hard	Megane Bianco	Ilze Hattingh Madrie Le Roux	5–7, 6–3, [5–10]
Loss	5.	April 2012	Beaulieu-sur-Mer, France	G1	Clay	Erin Routliffe	Francesca Gariglio Giorgia Marchetti	6–2, 2–6, [5–10]
Loss	6.	July 2012	Castricum, Netherlands	G2	Clay	Katrine Isabel Steffensen	Lizette Cabrera Paige Hourigan	5–7, 6–7^{(3)}
Win	7.	December 2012	Abierto Juvenil Mexicano	GA	Clay	Elise Mertens	Belinda Bencic; Veronika Kudermetova	6–4, 7–6^{(3)}

== ITF Circuit finals ==
=== Singles: 10 (4 titles, 6 runner–ups) ===
Result	Date	Tournament	Tier	Surface	Opponent	Score
Win	Apr 2013	ITF Heraklion, Greece	10,000	Carpet	Anna Floris	6–1, 3–6, 6–3
Loss	Feb 2014	ITF Sharm El Sheikh, Egypt	10,000	Hard	Gai Ao	7–5, 6–7^{(4)}, 2–6
Win	Mar 2014	ITF Pula, Italy	10,000	Clay	Tatiana Pieri	6–2, 6–1
Loss	Jan 2016	ITF Hammamet, Tunisia	10,000	Clay	Angelica Moratelli	3–6, 3–6
Loss	Sep 2016	ITF Sion, Switzerland	10,000	Clay	Lucia Bronzetti	3–6, 6–7^{(5)}
Loss	Aug 2017	ITF Ivano-Frankivsk, Ukraine	15,000	Clay	Maryna Chernyshova	4–6, 6–3, 0–6
Win	Aug 2017	ITF Caslano, Switzerland	15,000	Clay	Alberta Brianti	6–3, 6–0
Loss	Sep 2019	ITF Tabarka, Tunisia	15,000	Clay	Seone Mendez	7–6^{(7)}, 1–6, 3–6
Win	Sep 2019	ITF Tabarka, Tunisia	15,000	Clay	Constance Sibille	6–2, 6–4
Loss	Feb 2020	ITF Monastir, Tunisia	15,000	Hard	Maria Timofeeva	5–7, 4–6

=== Doubles: 24 (10 titles, 14 runner–ups) ===
Result	Date	Tournament	Tier	Surface	Partner	Opponents	Score
Loss	Jan 2014	ITF Stuttgart, Germany	10,000	Hard	Lisa Ponomar	Carolin Daniels Laura Schaeder	6–4, 1–6, [7–10]
Loss	May 2015	ITF Bol, Croatia	10,000	Clay	Iva Primorac	Lina Gjorcheska Christina Shakovets	6–4, 2–6, [2–10]
Win	Jun 2015	ITF Lenzerheide, Switzerland	25,000	Clay	Yvonne Cavallé Reimers	Xenia Knoll Antonia Lottner	WALKOVER
Loss	Aug 2015	ITF Rotterdam, Netherlands	10,000	Clay	Katharina Hering	Rosalie van der Hoek Kelly Versteeg	7–6^{(6)}, 1–6, [5–10]
Win	Sep 2015	ITF Engis, Belgium	10,000	Clay	Lara Michel	Margaux Bovy Hélène Scholsen	6–0, 6–4
Loss	Sep 2015	ITF Bol, Croatia	10,000	Clay	Iva Primorac	Lenka Jara Julia Lohoff	3–6, 6–4, [6–10]
Loss	Nov 2015	ITF Heraklion, Greece	10,000	Hard	Viktoriya Tomova	Eleni Christofi Vlada Katic	6–4, 3–6, [1–10]
Win	Nov 2015	ITF Heraklion, Greece	10,000	Hard	Viktoriya Tomova	Helen de Cesare Vlada Katic	6–2, 6–4
Win	Dec 2015	ITF El Kantaoui, Tunisia	10,000	Hard	Isabella Shinikova	Darya Chernetsova Yana Sizikova	4–6, 6–3, [10–7]
Loss	Dec 2015	ITF Antalya, Turkey	10,000	Clay	Nastja Kolar	Aminat Kushkhova Julia Stamatova	5–7, 1–6
Loss	Mar 2016	ITF Sharm El Sheikh, Egypt	10,000	Hard	Veronika Kapshay	Anastasiya Komardina Yana Sizikova	6–3, 3–6, [6–10]
Loss	Mar 2016	ITF Sharm El Sheikh, Egypt	10,000	Hard	Despina Papamichail	Veronika Kapshay Anastasiya Shoshyna	1–6, 2–6
Loss	Jul 2016	ITF Brussels, Belgium	10,000	Clay	Hélène Scholsen	Carolina Alves Ellen Perez	2–6, 3–6
Win	Jul 2016	ITF Sharm El Sheikh, Egypt	10,000	Hard	Victoria Muntean	Ola Abou Zekry Dhruthi Tatachar Venugopal	7–6^{(4)}, 2–6, [10–4]
Win	Sep 2016	ITF Sion, Switzerland	10,000	Clay	Emily Arbuthnott	Leonie Kung Simona Waltert	6–2, 6–1
Loss	Sep 2016	ITF Hammamet, Tunisia	10,000	Clay	Cristina Adamescu	Catherine Chantraine Sviatlana Pirazhenka	4–6, 5–7
Win	Oct 2016	ITF Hammamet, Tunisia	10,000	Clay	Carolina Alves	Fernanda Brito Noelia Zeballos Melgar	6–2, 4–6, [11–9]
Loss	Feb 2017	ITF Antalya, Turkey	15,000	Clay	Nastja Kolar	Başak Eraydın Valentyna Ivakhnenko	6–7^{(6)}, 2–6
Win	Feb 2017	ITF Antalya, Turkey	15,000	Clay	Başak Eraydın	Cristina Dinu Cristina Ene	6–3, 2–6, [10–5]
Loss	Feb 2017	ITF Antalya, Turkey	15,000	Clay	Başak Eraydın	Ayla Aksu Ekaterine Gorgodze	3–6, 1–6
Loss	Jul 2017	ITF Hua Hin, Thailand	25,000	Hard	Naiktha Bains	Luksika Kumkhum Ksenia Palkina	3–6, 6–2, [12–14]
Win	Jan 2018	ITF Hammamet, Tunisia	15,000	Clay	Maria Marfutina	Despina Papamichail Catalina Pella	7–5, 6–2
Win	Jan 2018	ITF Hammamet, Tunisia	15,000	Clay	Maria Marfutina	Natalija Stevanović Jelena Simic	6–4, 6–3
Loss	Jul 2018	ITF Bastad, Sweden	25,000	Clay	Anna Danilina	Chen Pei-hsuan Wu Fang-hsien	5–7, 6–1, [5–10]
