= 2012 ITF Women's Circuit (October–December) =

The 2012 ITF Women's Circuit was the 2012 edition of the second tier tour for women's professional tennis. It is organised by the International Tennis Federation and is a tier below the WTA Tour. The ITF Women's Circuit includes tournaments with prize money ranging from $10,000 up to $100,000.

== Key ==
$100,000 tournaments
$75,000 tournaments
$50,000 tournaments
$25,000 tournaments
$15,000 tournaments
$10,000 tournaments
All titles

== Month ==
=== October ===
Week of	Tournament	Winner	Runners-up	Semifinalists	Quarterfinalists
October 1	Esperance, Australia; Hard $25,000; Singles and doubles draws	(Australia) Olivia Rogowska; 6–0, 6–3	(Australia) Ashleigh Barty	(Japan) Miyabi Inoue (France) Alizé Lim	(Australia) Azra Hadzic (Slovakia) Zuzana Zlochová (France) Victoria Larrière (Chinese Taipei) Lee Hua-chen
October 1	Esperance, Australia; Hard $25,000; Singles and doubles draws	(Australia) Ashleigh Barty (Australia) Sally Peers; 4–6, 7–6^{(7–5)}, [10–4]	(France) Victoria Larrière (Australia) Olivia Rogowska	(Japan) Miyabi Inoue (France) Alizé Lim	(Australia) Azra Hadzic (Slovakia) Zuzana Zlochová (France) Victoria Larrière (Chinese Taipei) Lee Hua-chen
October 1	Gainesville, United States; Clay $10,000; Singles and doubles draws	(Bolivia) María Fernanda Álvarez Terán; 2–6, 6–0, 7–5	(Brazil) Maria Fernanda Alves	(Netherlands) Indy de Vroome (Russia) Yana Koroleva	(Japan) Yuuki Tanaka (United States) Jamie Loeb (Japan) Mari Osaka (Ukraine) Anastasia Kharchenko
October 1	Gainesville, United States; Clay $10,000; Singles and doubles draws	(Bolivia) María Fernanda Álvarez Terán (Russia) Angelina Gabueva; 7–6^{(7–4)}, 5–7, [10–7]	(United States) Kristi Boxx (United States) Keri Wong	(Netherlands) Indy de Vroome (Russia) Yana Koroleva	(Japan) Yuuki Tanaka (United States) Jamie Loeb (Japan) Mari Osaka (Ukraine) Anastasia Kharchenko
October 1	Antalya, Turkey; Clay $10,000; Singles and doubles draws	(Czech Republic) Kateřina Vaňková; 4–6, 6–4, 6–0	(Ukraine) Elizaveta Ianchuk	(Slovenia) Maša Zec Peškirič (Russia) Julia Samuseva	(Germany) Lena-Marie Hofmann (Germany) Katharina Lehnert (France) Anaïs Laurendon (Romania) Diana Buzean
October 1	Antalya, Turkey; Clay $10,000; Singles and doubles draws	(Ukraine) Elizaveta Ianchuk (Belarus) Sviatlana Pirazhenka; 7–6^{(7–0)}, 2–6, [10–7]	(France) Anaïs Laurendon (Czech Republic) Kateřina Vaňková	(Slovenia) Maša Zec Peškirič (Russia) Julia Samuseva	(Germany) Lena-Marie Hofmann (Germany) Katharina Lehnert (France) Anaïs Laurendon (Romania) Diana Buzean
October 1	Bidar, India; Hard $10,000; Singles and doubles draws	(Hong Kong) Venise Chan; 6–2, 6–3	(Japan) Yumi Miyazaki	(India) Ankita Raina (India) Prarthana Thombare	(India) Nidhi Chilumula (Thailand) Varunya Wongteanchai (South Korea) Kim Ju-eun (Thailand) Nungnadda Wannasuk
October 1	Bidar, India; Hard $10,000; Singles and doubles draws	(Ukraine) Oleksandra Korashvili (India) Rishika Sunkara; 6–4, 7–5	(Thailand) Nungnadda Wannasuk (China) Zhang Nannan	(India) Ankita Raina (India) Prarthana Thombare	(India) Nidhi Chilumula (Thailand) Varunya Wongteanchai (South Korea) Kim Ju-eun (Thailand) Nungnadda Wannasuk
October 1	Sharm el-Sheikh, Egypt; Hard $10,000; Singles and doubles draws	(Serbia) Ivana Jorović; 6–4, 6–2	(Germany) Jasmin Steinherr	(China) Lu Jiajing (France) Sherazad Benamar	(Belarus) Lidziya Marozava (Ukraine) Ganna Piven (Netherlands) Nicolette van Uitert (Austria) Tina Schiechtl
October 1	Sharm el-Sheikh, Egypt; Hard $10,000; Singles and doubles draws	(Netherlands) Kim Kilsdonk (Netherlands) Nicolette van Uitert; 4–6, 6–4, [10–3]	(China) Lu Jiajing (China) Lu Jiaxiang	(China) Lu Jiajing (France) Sherazad Benamar	(Belarus) Lidziya Marozava (Ukraine) Ganna Piven (Netherlands) Nicolette van Uitert (Austria) Tina Schiechtl
October 1	Kalamata, Greece; Hard $10,000; Singles and doubles draws	(Switzerland) Lara Michel; 7–6^{(7–4)}, 0–6, 6–0	(Liechtenstein) Kathinka von Deichmann	(Italy) Francesca Palmigiano (Netherlands) Lisanne van Riet	(Poland) Paulina Czarnik (Spain) Joséphine Boualem (Vietnam) Huỳnh Phương Đài Trang (Republic of Ireland) Amy Bowtell
October 1	Kalamata, Greece; Hard $10,000; Singles and doubles draws	(Vietnam) Huỳnh Phương Đài Trang (Israel) Keren Shlomo; 3–6, 6–2, [12–10]	(Germany) Stefanie Stemmer (Liechtenstein) Kathinka von Deichmann	(Italy) Francesca Palmigiano (Netherlands) Lisanne van Riet	(Poland) Paulina Czarnik (Spain) Joséphine Boualem (Vietnam) Huỳnh Phương Đài Trang (Republic of Ireland) Amy Bowtell
October 1	Solin, Croatia; Clay $10,000; Singles and doubles draws	(Croatia) Ana Savić; 5–7, 6–2, 7–5	(Croatia) Bernarda Pera	(Croatia) Adrijana Lekaj (Slovenia) Polona Reberšak	(Bosnia and Herzegovina) Dea Herdželaš (Slovenia) Anja Prislan (Hungary) Ágnes Bukta (Slovakia) Chantal Škamlová
October 1	Solin, Croatia; Clay $10,000; Singles and doubles draws	(Slovakia) Lenka Juríková (Slovakia) Chantal Škamlová; 7–5, 6–4	(Czech Republic) Denisa Allertová (Belgium) Michaela Boev	(Croatia) Adrijana Lekaj (Slovenia) Polona Reberšak	(Bosnia and Herzegovina) Dea Herdželaš (Slovenia) Anja Prislan (Hungary) Ágnes Bukta (Slovakia) Chantal Škamlová
October 8	ITF Women's Circuit – Suzhou; Suzhou, China; Hard $100,000; Singles – Doubles	(Chinese Taipei) Hsieh Su-wei; 6–2, 6–2	(China) Duan Yingying	(Croatia) Donna Vekić (China) Peng Shuai	(China) Sun Shengnan (France) Caroline Garcia (China) Zhang Shuai (China) Zhang Yuxuan
October 8	ITF Women's Circuit – Suzhou; Suzhou, China; Hard $100,000; Singles – Doubles	(Switzerland) Timea Bacsinszky (France) Caroline Garcia; 7–5, 6–3	(China) Yang Zhaoxuan (China) Zhao Yijing	(Croatia) Donna Vekić (China) Peng Shuai	(China) Sun Shengnan (France) Caroline Garcia (China) Zhang Shuai (China) Zhang Yuxuan
October 8	Open GDF Suez de Touraine; Joué-lès-Tours, France; Hard (indoor) $50,000; Singles – Doubles	(Puerto Rico) Monica Puig; 3–6, 6–4, 6–1	(Portugal) Maria João Koehler	(Belgium) An-Sophie Mestach (United States) Alison Riske	(Ukraine) Olga Savchuk (Austria) Yvonne Meusburger (Uzbekistan) Akgul Amanmuradova (Ukraine) Maryna Zanevska
October 8	Open GDF Suez de Touraine; Joué-lès-Tours, France; Hard (indoor) $50,000; Singles – Doubles	(France) Séverine Beltrame (France) Julie Coin; 7–5, 6–4	(Poland) Justyna Jegiołka (Latvia) Diāna Marcinkēviča	(Belgium) An-Sophie Mestach (United States) Alison Riske	(Ukraine) Olga Savchuk (Austria) Yvonne Meusburger (Uzbekistan) Akgul Amanmuradova (Ukraine) Maryna Zanevska
October 8	Sant Cugat, Spain; Clay $25,000; Singles and doubles draws	(Spain) María Teresa Torró Flor; 6–1, 6–4	(Spain) Estrella Cabeza Candela	(Spain) Laura Pous Tió (Spain) Eva Fernández Brugués	(Ukraine) Yuliya Beygelzimer (Germany) Kathrin Wörle (Serbia) Aleksandra Krunić (Brazil) Teliana Pereira
October 8	Sant Cugat, Spain; Clay $25,000; Singles and doubles draws	(Spain) Leticia Costas (Spain) Arantxa Parra Santonja; 6–3, 6–3	(Spain) Inés Ferrer Suárez (Netherlands) Richèl Hogenkamp	(Spain) Laura Pous Tió (Spain) Eva Fernández Brugués	(Ukraine) Yuliya Beygelzimer (Germany) Kathrin Wörle (Serbia) Aleksandra Krunić (Brazil) Teliana Pereira
October 8	Antalya, Turkey; Clay $10,000; Singles and doubles draws	(Serbia) Jovana Jakšić; 6–2, 6–3	(Germany) Lena-Marie Hofmann	(Ukraine) Elizaveta Ianchuk (Czech Republic) Kateřina Vaňková	(France) Anaïs Laurendon (Greece) Despina Papamichail (Russia) Polina Vinogradova (Romania) Diana Buzean
October 8	Antalya, Turkey; Clay $10,000; Singles and doubles draws	(France) Anaïs Laurendon (Czech Republic) Kateřina Vaňková; 6–2, 6–4	(Ukraine) Alona Fomina (North Macedonia) Lina Gjorcheska	(Ukraine) Elizaveta Ianchuk (Czech Republic) Kateřina Vaňková	(France) Anaïs Laurendon (Greece) Despina Papamichail (Russia) Polina Vinogradova (Romania) Diana Buzean
October 8	Troy, United States; Hard $25,000; Singles and doubles draws	(Canada) Stéphanie Dubois; 3–6, 6–4, 6–3	(Canada) Sharon Fichman	(Portugal) Michelle Larcher de Brito (Romania) Edina Gallovits-Hall	(United States) Grace Min (United States) Chiara Scholl (Venezuela) Adriana Pérez (Norway) Ulrikke Eikeri
October 8	Troy, United States; Hard $25,000; Singles and doubles draws	(Russia) Angelina Gabueva (Russia) Arina Rodionova; 6–4, 6–4	(Canada) Sharon Fichman (Canada) Marie-Ève Pelletier	(Portugal) Michelle Larcher de Brito (Romania) Edina Gallovits-Hall	(United States) Grace Min (United States) Chiara Scholl (Venezuela) Adriana Pérez (Norway) Ulrikke Eikeri
October 8	Margaret River, Australia; Hard $25,000; Singles and doubles draws	(France) Victoria Larrière; 6–3, 6–3	(Australia) Olivia Rogowska	(Japan) Miyabi Inoue (Japan) Yuka Higuchi	(Australia) Tammi Patterson (Japan) Sachie Ishizu (Australia) Jessica Moore (Thailand) Nicha Lertpitaksinchai
October 8	Margaret River, Australia; Hard $25,000; Singles and doubles draws	(Japan) Miyabi Inoue (Japan) Mai Minokoshi; 6–7^{(8–10)}, 7–6^{(7–3)}, [14–12]	(Thailand) Nicha Lertpitaksinchai (Thailand) Peangtarn Plipuech	(Japan) Miyabi Inoue (Japan) Yuka Higuchi	(Australia) Tammi Patterson (Japan) Sachie Ishizu (Australia) Jessica Moore (Thailand) Nicha Lertpitaksinchai
October 8	São Paulo, Brazil; Clay $10,000; Singles and doubles draws	(Chile) Fernanda Brito; 1–6, 6–2, 6–4	(Argentina) Carolina Zeballos	(Brazil) Ana-Clara Duarte (Brazil) Laura Pigossi	(Brazil) Nathaly Kurata (Brazil) Nathalia Rossi (Paraguay) Montserrat González (Romania) Daiana Negreanu
October 8	São Paulo, Brazil; Clay $10,000; Singles and doubles draws	(Chile) Fernanda Brito (Argentina) Guadalupe Pérez Rojas; 4–6, 6–2, [10–5]	(Brazil) Flávia Dechandt Araújo (Argentina) Carolina Zeballos	(Brazil) Ana-Clara Duarte (Brazil) Laura Pigossi	(Brazil) Nathaly Kurata (Brazil) Nathalia Rossi (Paraguay) Montserrat González (Romania) Daiana Negreanu
October 8	Sarajevo, Bosnia and Herzegovina; Clay $15,000; Singles and doubles draws	(Russia) Victoria Kan; 4–6, 6–4, 5–2, retired	(Germany) Dinah Pfizenmaier	(Czech Republic) Martina Kubičíková (Hungary) Ágnes Bukta	(Slovenia) Tjaša Šrimpf (Serbia) Milana Špremo (Czech Republic) Barbora Krejčíková (Germany) Anne Schäfer
October 8	Sarajevo, Bosnia and Herzegovina; Clay $15,000; Singles and doubles draws	(Czech Republic) Barbora Krejčíková (Czech Republic) Tereza Malíková; 6–3, 6–2	(Italy) Angelica Moratelli (Serbia) Milana Špremo	(Czech Republic) Martina Kubičíková (Hungary) Ágnes Bukta	(Slovenia) Tjaša Šrimpf (Serbia) Milana Špremo (Czech Republic) Barbora Krejčíková (Germany) Anne Schäfer
October 8	Mexico City, Mexico; Hard $10,000; Singles and doubles draws	(Mexico) Marcela Zacarías; 6–4, 6–2	(Mexico) Victoria Rodríguez	(Mexico) Ximena Hermoso (Italy) Federica Grazioso	(Russia) Tanya Samodelok (United States) Ashley Murdock (United States) Stephanie Kent (United States) Katie Ruckert
October 8	Mexico City, Mexico; Hard $10,000; Singles and doubles draws	(Mexico) Ximena Hermoso (Mexico) Marcela Zacarías; 6–3, 7–5	(Russia) Nika Kukharchuk (United States) Jessica Lawrence	(Mexico) Ximena Hermoso (Italy) Federica Grazioso	(Russia) Tanya Samodelok (United States) Ashley Murdock (United States) Stephanie Kent (United States) Katie Ruckert
October 8	Mytilini, Greece; Hard $10,000; Singles and doubles draws	(Greece) Despoina Vogasari; 6–1, 2–6, 6–4	(Poland) Sylwia Zagórska	(Bulgaria) Julia Stamatova (Germany) Carolin Daniels	(Poland) Paulina Czarnik (Liechtenstein) Kathinka von Deichmann (Netherlands) Lisanne van Riet (Italy) Nicole Clerico
October 8	Mytilini, Greece; Hard $10,000; Singles and doubles draws	(France) Manon Arcangioli (France) Laëtitia Sarrazin; 6–4, 6–3	(Germany) Stefanie Stemmer (Liechtenstein) Kathinka von Deichmann	(Bulgaria) Julia Stamatova (Germany) Carolin Daniels	(Poland) Paulina Czarnik (Liechtenstein) Kathinka von Deichmann (Netherlands) Lisanne van Riet (Italy) Nicole Clerico
October 15	Open GDF Suez Région Limousin; Limoges, France; Hard (indoor) $50,000; Singles – Doubles	(France) Claire Feuerstein; 7–5, 6–3	(Ukraine) Maryna Zanevska	(Poland) Marta Domachowska (Switzerland) Stefanie Vögele	(United States) Alison Riske (Slovakia) Zuzana Luknárová (Japan) Kimiko Date-Krumm (Netherlands) Angelique van der Meet
October 15	Open GDF Suez Région Limousin; Limoges, France; Hard (indoor) $50,000; Singles – Doubles	(Poland) Magda Linette (Poland) Sandra Zaniewska; 6–1, 5–7, [10–5]	(France) Irena Pavlovic (Switzerland) Stefanie Vögele	(Poland) Marta Domachowska (Switzerland) Stefanie Vögele	(United States) Alison Riske (Slovakia) Zuzana Luknárová (Japan) Kimiko Date-Krumm (Netherlands) Angelique van der Meet
October 15	Glasgow, United Kingdom; Hard (indoor) $25,000; Singles and doubles draws	(United Kingdom) Samantha Murray; 6–3, 2–6, 6–3	(Belgium) Alison Van Uytvanck	(Croatia) Ana Vrljić (Latvia) Diāna Marcinkēviča	(Austria) Patricia Mayr-Achleitner (Republic of Ireland) Amy Bowtell (United Kingdom) Tara Moore (Liechtenstein) Stephanie Vogt
October 15	Glasgow, United Kingdom; Hard (indoor) $25,000; Singles and doubles draws	(Poland) Justyna Jegiołka (Latvia) Diāna Marcinkēviča; 6–2, 6–1	(Italy) Nicole Clerico (Germany) Anna Zaja	(Croatia) Ana Vrljić (Latvia) Diāna Marcinkēviča	(Austria) Patricia Mayr-Achleitner (Republic of Ireland) Amy Bowtell (United Kingdom) Tara Moore (Liechtenstein) Stephanie Vogt
October 15	Seville, Spain; Clay $25,000; Singles and doubles draws	(Brazil) Teliana Pereira; 4–6, 7–6^{(7–3)}, 7–6^{(7–5)}	(Spain) Estrella Cabeza Candela	(Argentina) Catalina Pella (Ukraine) Yuliya Beygelzimer	(Venezuela) Andrea Gámiz (Serbia) Aleksandra Krunić (Spain) Laura Pous Tió (Netherlands) Richèl Hogenkamp
October 15	Seville, Spain; Clay $25,000; Singles and doubles draws	(Poland) Paula Kania (Poland) Katarzyna Piter; 5–7, 6–4, [10–6]	(Bulgaria) Aleksandrina Naydenova (Brazil) Teliana Pereira	(Argentina) Catalina Pella (Ukraine) Yuliya Beygelzimer	(Venezuela) Andrea Gámiz (Serbia) Aleksandra Krunić (Spain) Laura Pous Tió (Netherlands) Richèl Hogenkamp
October 15	Lagos, Nigeria; Hard $25,000; Singles and doubles draws	(Romania) Cristina Dinu; 7–5, 4–6, 6–4	(South Africa) Chanel Simmonds	(Russia) Nina Bratchikova (Switzerland) Conny Perrin	(Madagascar) Zarah Razafimahatratra (Israel) Valeria Patiuk (Russia) Alexandra Romanova (China) Lu Jiajing
October 15	Lagos, Nigeria; Hard $25,000; Singles and doubles draws	(Switzerland) Conny Perrin (South Africa) Chanel Simmonds; 6–1, 6–1	(Russia) Nina Bratchikova (Russia) Margarita Lazareva	(Russia) Nina Bratchikova (Switzerland) Conny Perrin	(Madagascar) Zarah Razafimahatratra (Israel) Valeria Patiuk (Russia) Alexandra Romanova (China) Lu Jiajing
October 15	Rock Hill, United States; Hard $25,000; Singles and doubles draws	(Canada) Rebecca Marino; 3–6, 7–6^{(7–5)}, 6–2	(Canada) Sharon Fichman	(Canada) Stéphanie Dubois (United States) Grace Min	(Portugal) Michelle Larcher de Brito (United States) Chiara Scholl (Norway) Ulrikke Eikeri (Romania) Edina Gallovits-Hall
October 15	Rock Hill, United States; Hard $25,000; Singles and doubles draws	(United States) Jacqueline Cako (United States) Natalie Pluskota; 6–2, 6–3	(United States) Chieh-Yu Hsu (United States) Chiara Scholl	(Canada) Stéphanie Dubois (United States) Grace Min	(Portugal) Michelle Larcher de Brito (United States) Chiara Scholl (Norway) Ulrikke Eikeri (Romania) Edina Gallovits-Hall
October 15	Makinohara, Japan; Grass $25,000; Singles and doubles draws	(United States) Alexa Glatch; 6–3, 6–4	(Australia) Monique Adamczak	(Japan) Miharu Imanishi (France) Caroline Garcia	(Japan) Kumiko Iijima (Israel) Julia Glushko (Japan) Eri Hozumi (Netherlands) Indy de Vroome
October 15	Makinohara, Japan; Grass $25,000; Singles and doubles draws	(Japan) Eri Hozumi (Japan) Miyu Kato; 7–6^{(8–6)}, 6–3	(Australia) Monique Adamczak (France) Caroline Garcia	(Japan) Miharu Imanishi (France) Caroline Garcia	(Japan) Kumiko Iijima (Israel) Julia Glushko (Japan) Eri Hozumi (Netherlands) Indy de Vroome
October 15	Antalya, Turkey; Clay $10,000; Singles and doubles draws	(Ukraine) Olga Ianchuk; 6–2, 2–6, 6–3	(Netherlands) Demi Schuurs	(Italy) Alice Savoretti (Serbia) Natalija Kostić	(Ukraine) Valeriya Strakhova (Italy) Giulia Sussarello (Spain) Carmen López Rueda (Poland) Barbara Sobaszkiewicz
October 15	Antalya, Turkey; Clay $10,000; Singles and doubles draws	(Ukraine) Alona Fomina (North Macedonia) Lina Gjorcheska; 6–0, 6–4	(Italy) Alice Matteucci (Poland) Barbara Sobaszkiewicz	(Italy) Alice Savoretti (Serbia) Natalija Kostić	(Ukraine) Valeriya Strakhova (Italy) Giulia Sussarello (Spain) Carmen López Rueda (Poland) Barbara Sobaszkiewicz
October 15	Santiago, Chile; Clay $10,000; Singles and doubles draws	(Chile) Daniela Seguel; 2–6, 7–5, 7–6^{(7–4)}	(Argentina) Carolina Zeballos	(Chile) Macarena Olivares López (Brazil) Laura Pigossi	(Argentina) Sofía Luini (Argentina) Francesca Rescaldani (Argentina) Aranza Salut (Chile) Cecilia Costa Melgar
October 15	Santiago, Chile; Clay $10,000; Singles and doubles draws	(Argentina) Aranza Salut (Argentina) Carolina Zeballos; 4–6, 6–4, [10–8]	(Chile) Cecilia Costa Melgar (Chile) Daniela Seguel	(Chile) Macarena Olivares López (Brazil) Laura Pigossi	(Argentina) Sofía Luini (Argentina) Francesca Rescaldani (Argentina) Aranza Salut (Chile) Cecilia Costa Melgar
October 15	Akko, Israel; Hard $10,000; Singles and doubles draws	(Poland) Natalia Kołat; 6–7^{(5–7)}, 6–4, 6–2	(Israel) Deniz Khazaniuk	(Poland) Olga Brózda (Czech Republic) Nikola Fraňková	(Armenia) Ani Amiraghyan (Russia) Yana Buchina (Russia) Emiliya Gadzhieva (Romania) Elena-Teodora Cadar
October 15	Akko, Israel; Hard $10,000; Singles and doubles draws	(Poland) Olga Brózda (Poland) Natalia Kołat; 6–2, 6–4	(Czech Republic) Nikola Fraňková (Russia) Ekaterina Yashina	(Poland) Olga Brózda (Czech Republic) Nikola Fraňková	(Armenia) Ani Amiraghyan (Russia) Yana Buchina (Russia) Emiliya Gadzhieva (Romania) Elena-Teodora Cadar
October 15	Mexico City, Mexico; Hard $10,000; Singles and doubles draws	(Mexico) Marcela Zacarías; 7–5, 6–1	(Russia) Nika Kukharchuk	(Mexico) Victoria Rodríguez (United States) Casey Robinson	(Mexico) Ximena Hermoso (Italy) Federica Grazioso (United States) Jessica Lawrence (United States) Elizabeth Ferris
October 15	Mexico City, Mexico; Hard $10,000; Singles and doubles draws	(Mexico) Beatriz Ríos (Colombia) Paula Catalina Robles García; 1–6, 6–2, [10–3]	(Mexico) Covadonga Muradas (Peru) Ingrid Várgas Calvo	(Mexico) Victoria Rodríguez (United States) Casey Robinson	(Mexico) Ximena Hermoso (Italy) Federica Grazioso (United States) Jessica Lawrence (United States) Elizabeth Ferris
October 15	Heraklion, Greece; Carpet $10,000; Singles and doubles draws	(Switzerland) Corina Jäger; 6–1, 6–4	(France) Manon Arcangioli	(Poland) Sylwia Zagórska (France) Laëtitia Sarrazin	(Netherlands) Mandy Wagemaker (Germany) Laura Schaeder (Spain) Joséphine Boualem (Russia) Karina Isayan
October 15	Heraklion, Greece; Carpet $10,000; Singles and doubles draws	(France) Manon Arcangioli (France) Laëtitia Sarrazin; 7–6^{(7–4)}, 6–2	(Netherlands) Valeria Podda (Netherlands) Rosalie van der Hoek	(Poland) Sylwia Zagórska (France) Laëtitia Sarrazin	(Netherlands) Mandy Wagemaker (Germany) Laura Schaeder (Spain) Joséphine Boualem (Russia) Karina Isayan
October 15	Dubrovnik, Croatia; Clay $10,000; Singles and doubles draws	(Czech Republic) Barbora Krejčíková; 6–4, 6–1	(Russia) Polina Leykina	(Romania) Laura-Ioana Andrei (Slovakia) Karin Morgošová	(Hungary) Vanda Lukács (Croatia) Tena Lukas (Slovakia) Chantal Škamlová (Slovenia) Polona Reberšak
October 15	Dubrovnik, Croatia; Clay $10,000; Singles and doubles draws	(Italy) Giulia Bruzzone (Italy) Chiara Mendo; 6–4, 6–2	(Czech Republic) Barbora Krejčíková (Czech Republic) Martina Kubičíková	(Romania) Laura-Ioana Andrei (Slovakia) Karin Morgošová	(Hungary) Vanda Lukács (Croatia) Tena Lukas (Slovakia) Chantal Škamlová (Slovenia) Polona Reberšak
October 22	Internationaux Féminins de la Vienne; Poitiers, France; Hard (indoor) $100,000; Singles – Doubles	(Puerto Rico) Monica Puig; 7–5, 1–6, 7–5	(Russia) Elena Vesnina	(Slovakia) Magdaléna Rybáriková (Romania) Monica Niculescu	(Switzerland) Stefanie Vögele (France) Stéphanie Foretz Gacon (Kazakhstan) Yulia Putintseva (Italy) Nastassja Burnett
October 22	Internationaux Féminins de la Vienne; Poitiers, France; Hard (indoor) $100,000; Singles – Doubles	(Colombia) Catalina Castaño (Bosnia and Herzegovina) Mervana Jugić-Salkić; 6–4, 5–7, [10–4]	(France) Stéphanie Foretz Gacon (Germany) Tatjana Malek	(Slovakia) Magdaléna Rybáriková (Romania) Monica Niculescu	(Switzerland) Stefanie Vögele (France) Stéphanie Foretz Gacon (Kazakhstan) Yulia Putintseva (Italy) Nastassja Burnett
October 22	Büschl Open; Ismaning, Germany; Carpet (indoor) $75,000+H; Singles – Doubles	(Germany) Annika Beck; 6–3, 7–6^{(10–8)}	(Czech Republic) Eva Birnerová	(Czech Republic) Karolína Plíšková (Germany) Carina Witthöft	(Austria) Yvonne Meusburger (Ukraine) Lesia Tsurenko (Australia) Anastasia Rodionova (Greece) Eleni Daniilidou
October 22	Büschl Open; Ismaning, Germany; Carpet (indoor) $75,000+H; Singles – Doubles	(Switzerland) Romina Oprandi (Switzerland) Amra Sadiković; 4–6, 6–3, [10–7]	(United States) Jill Craybas (Czech Republic) Eva Hrdinová	(Czech Republic) Karolína Plíšková (Germany) Carina Witthöft	(Austria) Yvonne Meusburger (Ukraine) Lesia Tsurenko (Australia) Anastasia Rodionova (Greece) Eleni Daniilidou
October 22	National Bank Challenger Saguenay; Saguenay, Canada; Hard (indoor) $50,000; Singles – Doubles	(United States) Madison Keys; 6–4, 6–2	(Canada) Eugenie Bouchard	(United States) Melanie Oudin (Russia) Alla Kudryavtseva	(United Kingdom) Samantha Murray (Canada) Sharon Fichman (United States) Sachia Vickery (Austria) Nicole Rottmann
October 22	National Bank Challenger Saguenay; Saguenay, Canada; Hard (indoor) $50,000; Singles – Doubles	(Canada) Gabriela Dabrowski (Russia) Alla Kudryavtseva; 6–2, 6–2	(Canada) Sharon Fichman (Canada) Marie-Ève Pelletier	(United States) Melanie Oudin (Russia) Alla Kudryavtseva	(United Kingdom) Samantha Murray (Canada) Sharon Fichman (United States) Sachia Vickery (Austria) Nicole Rottmann
October 22	Lagos, Nigeria; Hard $25,000; Singles and doubles draws	(Romania) Cristina Dinu; 6–3, 6–3	(Switzerland) Conny Perrin	(Russia) Nina Bratchikova (Slovenia) Tadeja Majerič	(Slovenia) Dalila Jakupovič (Russia) Margarita Lazareva (China) Lu Jiajing (South Africa) Chanel Simmonds
October 22	Lagos, Nigeria; Hard $25,000; Singles and doubles draws	(Switzerland) Conny Perrin (South Africa) Chanel Simmonds; 6–2, 3–6, [10–7]	(China) Lu Jiajing (China) Lu Jiaxiang	(Russia) Nina Bratchikova (Slovenia) Tadeja Majerič	(Slovenia) Dalila Jakupovič (Russia) Margarita Lazareva (China) Lu Jiajing (South Africa) Chanel Simmonds
October 22	Hamamatsu, Japan; Grass $25,000; Singles and doubles draws	(United States) Alexa Glatch; 6–2, 6–3	(Australia) Monique Adamczak	(Japan) Shuko Aoyama (Russia) Ksenia Lykina	(Japan) Misa Eguchi (Japan) Riko Sawayanagi (Japan) Erika Takao (Japan) Eri Hozumi
October 22	Hamamatsu, Japan; Grass $25,000; Singles and doubles draws	(Japan) Shuko Aoyama (Japan) Miki Miyamura; 3–6, 6–4, [10–6]	(Australia) Monique Adamczak (United States) Alexa Glatch	(Japan) Shuko Aoyama (Russia) Ksenia Lykina	(Japan) Misa Eguchi (Japan) Riko Sawayanagi (Japan) Erika Takao (Japan) Eri Hozumi
October 22	Samsung Securities Cup; Seoul, South Korea; Hard $25,000; Singles – Doubles	(Japan) Erika Sema; 6–1, 7–5	(Japan) Mai Minokoshi	(China) Zhang Yuxuan (South Korea) Kim Na-ri	(Croatia) Donna Vekić (Hong Kong) Venise Chan (South Korea) Han Sung-hee (South Korea) Kang Seo-kyung
October 22	Samsung Securities Cup; Seoul, South Korea; Hard $25,000; Singles – Doubles	(Uzbekistan) Nigina Abduraimova (Hong Kong) Venise Chan; 6–4, 2–6, [12–10]	(South Korea) Kim Ji-young (South Korea) Yoo Mi	(China) Zhang Yuxuan (South Korea) Kim Na-ri	(Croatia) Donna Vekić (Hong Kong) Venise Chan (South Korea) Han Sung-hee (South Korea) Kang Seo-kyung
October 22	Florence, United States; Hard $25,000; Singles and doubles draws	(Colombia) Mariana Duque; 4–6, 6–2, 6–1	(Canada) Stéphanie Dubois	(United States) Grace Min (Romania) Edina Gallovits-Hall	(United States) Taylor Townsend (Japan) Mayo Hibi (United States) Chieh-Yu Hsu (Japan) Akiko Omae
October 22	Florence, United States; Hard $25,000; Singles and doubles draws	(Norway) Ulrikke Eikeri (Japan) Akiko Omae; 6–1, 6–1	(United States) Brooke Austin (United States) Hayley Carter	(United States) Grace Min (Romania) Edina Gallovits-Hall	(United States) Taylor Townsend (Japan) Mayo Hibi (United States) Chieh-Yu Hsu (Japan) Akiko Omae
October 22	Taipei, Chinese Taipei; Hard $25,000; Singles and doubles draws	(China) Zheng Saisai; 6–4, 6–1	(Kazakhstan) Zarina Diyas	(Chinese Taipei) Chang Kai-chen (France) Caroline Garcia	(Thailand) Noppawan Lertcheewakarn (Thailand) Nudnida Luangnam (Hong Kong) Wu Ho-ching (China) Yang Zi
October 22	Taipei, Chinese Taipei; Hard $25,000; Singles and doubles draws	(Chinese Taipei) Chan Chin-wei (France) Caroline Garcia; 4–6, 6–4, [10–6]	(Chinese Taipei) Kao Shao-yuan (Chinese Taipei) Lee Hua-chen	(Chinese Taipei) Chang Kai-chen (France) Caroline Garcia	(Thailand) Noppawan Lertcheewakarn (Thailand) Nudnida Luangnam (Hong Kong) Wu Ho-ching (China) Yang Zi
October 22	Stockholm, Sweden; Hard (indoor) $10,000; Singles and doubles draws	(Sweden) Sandra Roma; 6–2, 6–1	(United Kingdom) Emily Webley-Smith	(Sweden) Rebecca Peterson (Sweden) Hilda Melander	(Russia) Karina Isayan (Russia) Julia Samuseva (Sweden) Julia Klackenberg (Russia) Anastasiya Saitova
October 22	Stockholm, Sweden; Hard (indoor) $10,000; Singles and doubles draws	(Sweden) Donika Bashota (Latvia) Jeļena Ostapenko; 7–6^{(7–4)}, 6–1	(Russia) Maria Mokh (Estonia) Eva Paalma	(Sweden) Rebecca Peterson (Sweden) Hilda Melander	(Russia) Karina Isayan (Russia) Julia Samuseva (Sweden) Julia Klackenberg (Russia) Anastasiya Saitova
October 22	Antalya, Turkey; Clay $10,000; Singles and doubles draws	(Ukraine) Olga Ianchuk; 3–6, 6–4, 6–4	(Romania) Diana Buzean	(Ukraine) Elizaveta Ianchuk (Ukraine) Ganna Poznikhirenko	(Poland) Barbara Sobaszkiewicz (Serbia) Natalija Kostić (Netherlands) Daniëlle Harmsen (Netherlands) Monique Zuur
October 22	Antalya, Turkey; Clay $10,000; Singles and doubles draws	(Romania) Alexandra Damaschin (Poland) Barbara Sobaszkiewicz; 6–1, 3–6, [10–2]	(Ukraine) Viktoriya Lushkova (Ukraine) Ganna Poznikhirenko	(Ukraine) Elizaveta Ianchuk (Ukraine) Ganna Poznikhirenko	(Poland) Barbara Sobaszkiewicz (Serbia) Natalija Kostić (Netherlands) Daniëlle Harmsen (Netherlands) Monique Zuur
October 22	Santiago, Chile; Clay $10,000; Singles and doubles draws	(Chile) Cecilia Costa Melgar; 6–4, 6–2	(Chile) Daniela Seguel	(Argentina) Sofía Luini (Argentina) Aranza Salut	(Brazil) Flávia Dechandt Araújo (Chile) Camila Silva (Chile) Macarena Olivares López (Argentina) Guadalupe Moreno
October 22	Santiago, Chile; Clay $10,000; Singles and doubles draws	(Chile) Cecilia Costa Melgar (Chile) Daniela Seguel; 6–3, 6–4	(Argentina) Ornella Caron (Argentina) Aranza Salut	(Argentina) Sofía Luini (Argentina) Aranza Salut	(Brazil) Flávia Dechandt Araújo (Chile) Camila Silva (Chile) Macarena Olivares López (Argentina) Guadalupe Moreno
October 22	Traralgon, Australia; Hard $25,000; Singles and doubles draws	(Australia) Ashleigh Barty; 6–2, 6–3	(Russia) Arina Rodionova	(Australia) Jessica Moore (Russia) Daria Gavrilova	(Australia) Sally Peers (Australia) Bojana Bobusic (Slovakia) Zuzana Zlochová (France) Alizé Lim
October 22	Traralgon, Australia; Hard $25,000; Singles and doubles draws	(Zimbabwe) Cara Black (Russia) Arina Rodionova; 2–6, 7–6^{(7–4)}, [10–8]	(Australia) Ashleigh Barty (Australia) Sally Peers	(Australia) Jessica Moore (Russia) Daria Gavrilova	(Australia) Sally Peers (Australia) Bojana Bobusic (Slovakia) Zuzana Zlochová (France) Alizé Lim
October 22	Luque, Paraguay; Clay $10,000; Singles and doubles draws	(Paraguay) Camila Giangreco Campiz; 7–5, 6–4	(United States) Anamika Bhargava	(Argentina) Carolina Costamagna (Argentina) Andrea Benítez	(Colombia) María Fernanda Herazo (United States) Libby Muma (United States) Sylvia Krywacz (Romania) Daiana Negreanu
October 22	Luque, Paraguay; Clay $10,000; Singles and doubles draws	(United States) Anamika Bhargava (United States) Sylvia Krywacz; 6–4, 6–2	(Argentina) Andrea Benítez (Brazil) Raquel Piltcher	(Argentina) Carolina Costamagna (Argentina) Andrea Benítez	(Colombia) María Fernanda Herazo (United States) Libby Muma (United States) Sylvia Krywacz (Romania) Daiana Negreanu
October 22	Dubrovnik, Croatia; Clay $10,000; Singles and doubles draws	(Romania) Laura-Ioana Andrei; 3–6, 6–4, 6–2	(Slovakia) Lenka Juríková	(Slovakia) Karin Morgošová (Ukraine) Sofiya Kovalets	(Czech Republic) Barbora Krejčíková (Switzerland) Xenia Knoll (Croatia) Bernarda Pera (Slovenia) Tjaša Šrimpf
October 22	Dubrovnik, Croatia; Clay $10,000; Singles and doubles draws	(Czech Republic) Barbora Krejčíková (Czech Republic) Tereza Malíková; 7–5, 7–6^{(7–5)}	(Slovakia) Lucia Butkovská (Germany) Christina Shakovets	(Slovakia) Karin Morgošová (Ukraine) Sofiya Kovalets	(Czech Republic) Barbora Krejčíková (Switzerland) Xenia Knoll (Croatia) Bernarda Pera (Slovenia) Tjaša Šrimpf
October 22	Monastir, Tunisia; Hard $10,000; Singles and doubles draws	(Turkey) Başak Eraydın; 6–2, 7–6^{(7–5)}	(Russia) Marina Shamayko	(Turkey) Melis Sezer (Czech Republic) Martina Borecká	(Russia) Varvara Flink (Italy) Alice Balducci (Russia) Diana Isaeva (Netherlands) Lisanne van Riet
October 22	Monastir, Tunisia; Hard $10,000; Singles and doubles draws	(Czech Republic) Martina Borecká (France) Amandine Cazeaux; 7–5, 7–5	(Netherlands) Valeria Podda (Netherlands) Lisanne van Riet	(Turkey) Melis Sezer (Czech Republic) Martina Borecká	(Russia) Varvara Flink (Italy) Alice Balducci (Russia) Diana Isaeva (Netherlands) Lisanne van Riet
October 22	Ashkelon, Israel; Hard $10,000; Singles and doubles draws	(Romania) Elena-Teodora Cadar; 1–6, 6–1, 6–2	(Israel) Ekaterina Tour	(Armenia) Ani Amiraghyan (Russia) Daria Mironova	(Ukraine) Anastasiya Vasylyeva (Russia) Yana Buchina (Russia) Ekaterina Yashina (Russia) Ksenia Kirillova
October 22	Ashkelon, Israel; Hard $10,000; Singles and doubles draws	(Poland) Olga Brózda (Poland) Natalia Kołat; 7–6^{(13–11)}, 6–1	(Czech Republic) Nikola Fraňková (Russia) Ekaterina Yashina	(Armenia) Ani Amiraghyan (Russia) Daria Mironova	(Ukraine) Anastasiya Vasylyeva (Russia) Yana Buchina (Russia) Ekaterina Yashina (Russia) Ksenia Kirillova
October 22	Victoria, Mexico; Hard $10,000; Singles and doubles draws	(Russia) Nika Kukharchuk; 7–5, 6–0	(Mexico) Victoria Rodríguez	(Mexico) Alejandra Cisneros (Kazakhstan) Yelena Nemchen	(Mexico) Giovanna Manifacio (Mexico) Marcela Zacarías (Kazakhstan) Kamila Kerimbayeva (United States) Blair Shankle
October 22	Victoria, Mexico; Hard $10,000; Singles and doubles draws	(United States) Camila Fuentes (United States) Blair Shankle; 7–6^{(7–4)}, 6–1	(Mexico) Alejandra Cisneros (Mexico) Victoria Rodríguez	(Mexico) Alejandra Cisneros (Kazakhstan) Yelena Nemchen	(Mexico) Giovanna Manifacio (Mexico) Marcela Zacarías (Kazakhstan) Kamila Kerimbayeva (United States) Blair Shankle
October 22	Brasília, Brazil; Clay $25,000; Singles and doubles draws	(Switzerland) Timea Bacsinszky; 7–5, 6–2	(Romania) Raluca Olaru	(Argentina) Florencia Molinero (Bulgaria) Aleksandrina Naydenova	(United States) Julia Cohen (Argentina) María Irigoyen (Brazil) Eduarda Piai (Bolivia) María Fernanda Álvarez Terán
October 22	Brasília, Brazil; Clay $25,000; Singles and doubles draws	(Romania) Elena Bogdan (Romania) Raluca Olaru; 6–3, 3–6, [10–8]	(Switzerland) Timea Bacsinszky (United States) Julia Cohen	(Argentina) Florencia Molinero (Bulgaria) Aleksandrina Naydenova	(United States) Julia Cohen (Argentina) María Irigoyen (Brazil) Eduarda Piai (Bolivia) María Fernanda Álvarez Terán
October 29	Aegon GB Pro-Series Barnstaple; Barnstaple, United Kingdom; Hard (indoor) $75,000; Singles – Doubles	(Germany) Annika Beck; 6–7^{(1–7)}, 6–2, 6–2	(Greece) Eleni Daniilidou	(Serbia) Vesna Dolonc (France) Constance Sibille	(United States) Madison Brengle (Russia) Marta Sirotkina (Czech Republic) Eva Birnerová (United Kingdom) Naomi Broady
October 29	Aegon GB Pro-Series Barnstaple; Barnstaple, United Kingdom; Hard (indoor) $75,000; Singles – Doubles	(Uzbekistan) Akgul Amanmuradova (Serbia) Vesna Dolonc; 6–3, 6–1	(Latvia) Diāna Marcinkēviča (Belarus) Aliaksandra Sasnovich	(Serbia) Vesna Dolonc (France) Constance Sibille	(United States) Madison Brengle (Russia) Marta Sirotkina (Czech Republic) Eva Birnerová (United Kingdom) Naomi Broady
October 29	Open GDF Suez Nantes Atlantique; Nantes, France; Hard (indoor) $50,000+H; Singles – Doubles	(Romania) Monica Niculescu; 6–2, 6–3	(Kazakhstan) Yulia Putintseva	(France) Claire Feuerstein (France) Virginie Razzano	(Germany) Tatjana Malek (Argentina) Paula Ormaechea (Ukraine) Olga Savchuk (Czech Republic) Karolína Plíšková
October 29	Open GDF Suez Nantes Atlantique; Nantes, France; Hard (indoor) $50,000+H; Singles – Doubles	(Colombia) Catalina Castaño (Bosnia and Herzegovina) Mervana Jugić-Salkić; 6–4, 6–4	(Czech Republic) Petra Cetkovská (Czech Republic) Renata Voráčová	(France) Claire Feuerstein (France) Virginie Razzano	(Germany) Tatjana Malek (Argentina) Paula Ormaechea (Ukraine) Olga Savchuk (Czech Republic) Karolína Plíšková
October 29	John Newcombe Women's Pro Challenge; New Braunfels, United States; Hard $50,000; Singles – Doubles	(United States) Melanie Oudin; 6–1, 6–1	(Colombia) Mariana Duque	(United States) Madison Keys (Croatia) Mirjana Lučić	(Italy) Camila Giorgi (Norway) Ulrikke Eikeri (Portugal) Michelle Larcher de Brito (Croatia) Ajla Tomljanović
October 29	John Newcombe Women's Pro Challenge; New Braunfels, United States; Hard $50,000; Singles – Doubles	(Russia) Elena Bovina (Croatia) Mirjana Lučić; 6–3, 4–6, [10–8]	(Colombia) Mariana Duque (Venezuela) Adriana Pérez	(United States) Madison Keys (Croatia) Mirjana Lučić	(Italy) Camila Giorgi (Norway) Ulrikke Eikeri (Portugal) Michelle Larcher de Brito (Croatia) Ajla Tomljanović
October 29	Tevlin Women's Challenger; Toronto, Canada; Hard (indoor) $50,000; Singles – Doubles	(Canada) Eugenie Bouchard; 6–1, 6–2	(Canada) Sharon Fichman	(United States) Maria Sanchez (United States) Jessica Pegula	(Canada) Gabriela Dabrowski (Slovakia) Michaela Hončová (Russia) Alla Kudryavtseva (Canada) Stéphanie Dubois
October 29	Tevlin Women's Challenger; Toronto, Canada; Hard (indoor) $50,000; Singles – Doubles	(Canada) Gabriela Dabrowski (Russia) Alla Kudryavtseva; 6–2, 7–6^{(7–2)}	(Canada) Eugenie Bouchard (United States) Jessica Pegula	(United States) Maria Sanchez (United States) Jessica Pegula	(Canada) Gabriela Dabrowski (Slovakia) Michaela Hončová (Russia) Alla Kudryavtseva (Canada) Stéphanie Dubois
October 29	Istanbul, Turkey; Hard (indoor) $25,000; Singles and doubles draws	(Netherlands) Richèl Hogenkamp; 6–4, 6–3	(Turkey) Çağla Büyükakçay	(Uzbekistan) Nigina Abduraimova (Czech Republic) Tereza Smitková	(Germany) Justine Ozga (Switzerland) Amra Sadiković (Croatia) Ana Vrljić (Ukraine) Valentyna Ivakhnenko
October 29	Istanbul, Turkey; Hard (indoor) $25,000; Singles and doubles draws	(Turkey) Çağla Büyükakçay (Turkey) Pemra Özgen; 6–2, 6–1	(Uzbekistan) Nigina Abduraimova (Kyrgyzstan) Ksenia Palkina	(Uzbekistan) Nigina Abduraimova (Czech Republic) Tereza Smitková	(Germany) Justine Ozga (Switzerland) Amra Sadiković (Croatia) Ana Vrljić (Ukraine) Valentyna Ivakhnenko
October 29	Antalya, Turkey; Clay $10,000; Singles and doubles draws	(Serbia) Jovana Jakšić; 6–2, 7–6^{(7–3)}	(Ukraine) Ganna Poznikhirenko	(Ukraine) Marianna Zakarlyuk (Czech Republic) Petra Krejsová	(Romania) Diana Buzean (Netherlands) Daniëlle Harmsen (Romania) Irina Maria Bara (Romania) Ioana Loredana Roșca
October 29	Antalya, Turkey; Clay $10,000; Singles and doubles draws	(Romania) Diana Buzean (Netherlands) Daniëlle Harmsen; 4–6, 6–1, [10–3]	(Turkey) Hülya Esen (Turkey) Lütfiye Esen	(Ukraine) Marianna Zakarlyuk (Czech Republic) Petra Krejsová	(Romania) Diana Buzean (Netherlands) Daniëlle Harmsen (Romania) Irina Maria Bara (Romania) Ioana Loredana Roșca
October 29	Stockholm, Sweden; Hard (indoor) $10,000; Singles and doubles draws	(Latvia) Jeļena Ostapenko; 6–1, 6–3	(Sweden) Ellen Allgurin	(Germany) Carolin Daniels (Russia) Alina Silich	(Romania) Patricia Maria Țig (Russia) Maria Mokh (Russia) Anastasiya Saitova (Sweden) Hilda Melander
October 29	Stockholm, Sweden; Hard (indoor) $10,000; Singles and doubles draws	(Sweden) Hilda Melander (Sweden) Paulina Milosavljevic; 6–2, 6–1	(Germany) Carolin Daniels (Germany) Laura Schaeder	(Germany) Carolin Daniels (Russia) Alina Silich	(Romania) Patricia Maria Țig (Russia) Maria Mokh (Russia) Anastasiya Saitova (Sweden) Hilda Melander
October 29	Coimbra, Portugal; Hard $10,000; Singles and doubles draws	(Liechtenstein) Kathinka von Deichmann; 6–1, 6–3	(Moldova) Aliona Bolsova	(Spain) Yvonne Cavallé Reimers (Russia) Ulyana Ayzatulina	(Italy) Chiara Mendo (Serbia) Barbara Bonić (Spain) Joséphine Boualem (Spain) Ainhoa Atucha Gómez
October 29	Coimbra, Portugal; Hard $10,000; Singles and doubles draws	(Russia) Nadezda Gorbachovka (Russia) Ekaterina Pushkareva; 6–2, 6–3	(Russia) Ulyana Ayzatulina (Moldova) Aliona Bolsova	(Spain) Yvonne Cavallé Reimers (Russia) Ulyana Ayzatulina	(Italy) Chiara Mendo (Serbia) Barbara Bonić (Spain) Joséphine Boualem (Spain) Ainhoa Atucha Gómez
October 29	Quillota, Chile; Clay $10,000; Singles and doubles draws	(Chile) Camila Silva; 7–5, 4–6, 6–1	(Chile) Cecilia Costa Melgar	(Argentina) Ana Victoria Gobbi Monllau (Chile) Ivania Martinich	(Argentina) Barbara Montiel (Argentina) Guadalupe Moreno (Hungary) Naomi Totka (Argentina) Ornella Caron
October 29	Quillota, Chile; Clay $10,000; Singles and doubles draws	(Chile) Cecilia Costa Melgar (Chile) Camila Silva; 6–1, 6–1	(Argentina) Sofía Luini (Argentina) Barbara Montiel	(Argentina) Ana Victoria Gobbi Monllau (Chile) Ivania Martinich	(Argentina) Barbara Montiel (Argentina) Guadalupe Moreno (Hungary) Naomi Totka (Argentina) Ornella Caron
October 29	Bendigo, Australia; Hard $25,000; Singles and doubles draws	(Russia) Arina Rodionova; 6–4, 7–5	(Australia) Olivia Rogowska	(Russia) Daria Gavrilova (Australia) Ashleigh Barty	(Australia) Bojana Bobusic (France) Alizé Lim (Australia) Viktorija Rajicic (Australia) Storm Sanders
October 29	Bendigo, Australia; Hard $25,000; Singles and doubles draws	(Australia) Ashleigh Barty (Australia) Sally Peers; 7–6^{(14–12)}, 7–6^{(7–5)}	(Zimbabwe) Cara Black (Russia) Arina Rodionova	(Russia) Daria Gavrilova (Australia) Ashleigh Barty	(Australia) Bojana Bobusic (France) Alizé Lim (Australia) Viktorija Rajicic (Australia) Storm Sanders
October 29	Asunción, Paraguay; Clay $10,000; Singles and doubles draws	(Brazil) Eduarda Piai; 6–3, 7–6^{(8–6)}	(Argentina) Andrea Benítez	(Peru) Patricia Kú Flores (Romania) Daiana Negreanu	(Argentina) Sofía Blanco (Argentina) Carolina Costamagna (Brazil) Yasmine Guimarães (Paraguay) Camila Giangreco Campiz
October 29	Asunción, Paraguay; Clay $10,000; Singles and doubles draws	(United States) Anamika Bhargava (United States) Sylvia Krywacz; 6–1, 6–4	(Argentina) Andrea Benítez (Brazil) Raquel Piltcher	(Peru) Patricia Kú Flores (Romania) Daiana Negreanu	(Argentina) Sofía Blanco (Argentina) Carolina Costamagna (Brazil) Yasmine Guimarães (Paraguay) Camila Giangreco Campiz
October 29	Heraklion, Greece; Carpet $10,000; Singles and doubles draws	(France) Manon Arcangioli; 6–1, 6–2	(Bulgaria) Borislava Botusharova	(Italy) Angelica Moratelli (Bulgaria) Radina Dimitrova	(Germany) Lena-Marie Hofmann (Italy) Camilla Rosatello (Italy) Alice Savoretti (France) Laëtitia Sarrazin
October 29	Heraklion, Greece; Carpet $10,000; Singles and doubles draws	(France) Manon Arcangioli (France) Laëtitia Sarrazin; 6–4, 6–4	(Greece) Despina Papamichail (Greece) Despiona Vogasari	(Italy) Angelica Moratelli (Bulgaria) Radina Dimitrova	(Germany) Lena-Marie Hofmann (Italy) Camilla Rosatello (Italy) Alice Savoretti (France) Laëtitia Sarrazin
October 29	Monastir, Tunisia; Hard $10,000; Singles and doubles draws	(Slovakia) Nikola Vajdová; 6–3, 1–6, 6–3	(Germany) Vivian Heisen	(Netherlands) Lisanne van Riet (Russia) Varvara Flink	(France) Jessica Ginier (Netherlands) Valeria Podda (France) Amandine Cazeaux (Russia) Diana Isaeva
October 29	Monastir, Tunisia; Hard $10,000; Singles and doubles draws	(Russia) Varvara Flink (Netherlands) Jaimy-Gayle van de Wal; 6–3, 6–2	(Netherlands) Valeria Podda (Netherlands) Lisanne van Riet	(Netherlands) Lisanne van Riet (Russia) Varvara Flink	(France) Jessica Ginier (Netherlands) Valeria Podda (France) Amandine Cazeaux (Russia) Diana Isaeva
October 29	Buenos Aires, Argentina; Clay $25,000; Singles and doubles draws	(Brazil) Teliana Pereira; 6–1, 6–2	(United Kingdom) Amanda Carreras	(Romania) Raluca Olaru (Argentina) Florencia Molinero	(Argentina) María Irigoyen (Bolivia) María Fernanda Álvarez Terán (Switzerland) Timea Bacsinszky (Spain) Eva Fernández Brugués
October 29	Buenos Aires, Argentina; Clay $25,000; Singles and doubles draws	(Romania) Elena Bogdan (Romania) Raluca Olaru; 1–6, 6–2, [10–7]	(Bolivia) María Fernanda Álvarez Terán (Brazil) Maria Fernanda Alves	(Romania) Raluca Olaru (Argentina) Florencia Molinero	(Argentina) María Irigoyen (Bolivia) María Fernanda Álvarez Terán (Switzerland) Timea Bacsinszky (Spain) Eva Fernández Brugués
October 29	Netanya, Israel; Hard $25,000; Singles and doubles draws	(Slovakia) Anna Karolína Schmiedlová; 0–6, 6–3, 6–4	(Liechtenstein) Stephanie Vogt	(Spain) Arantxa Parra Santonja (Germany) Dinah Pfizenmaier	(Spain) Estrella Cabeza Candela (Ukraine) Lyudmyla Kichenok (Slovakia) Zuzana Luknárová (Russia) Ksenia Kirillova
October 29	Netanya, Israel; Hard $25,000; Singles and doubles draws	(Ukraine) Lyudmyla Kichenok (Ukraine) Nadiya Kichenok; 6–1, 6–4	(Slovakia) Zuzana Luknárová (Slovakia) Anna Karolína Schmiedlová	(Spain) Arantxa Parra Santonja (Germany) Dinah Pfizenmaier	(Spain) Estrella Cabeza Candela (Ukraine) Lyudmyla Kichenok (Slovakia) Zuzana Luknárová (Russia) Ksenia Kirillova

=== November ===
Week of	Tournament	Winner	Runners-up	Semifinalists	Quarterfinalists
November 5	Goldwater Women's Tennis Classic; Phoenix, United States; Hard $75,000; Singles – Doubles	(United States) Madison Keys; 6–3, 7–6^{(7–1)}	(United States) Maria Sanchez	(Canada) Gabriela Dabrowski (Canada) Sharon Fichman	(Italy) Camila Giorgi (Portugal) Michelle Larcher de Brito (Croatia) Mirjana Lučić (United States) Taylor Townsend
November 5	Goldwater Women's Tennis Classic; Phoenix, United States; Hard $75,000; Singles – Doubles	(United States) Jacqueline Cako (United States) Natalie Pluskota; 6–3, 2–6, [10–4]	(Canada) Eugenie Bouchard (Norway) Ulrikke Eikeri	(Canada) Gabriela Dabrowski (Canada) Sharon Fichman	(Italy) Camila Giorgi (Portugal) Michelle Larcher de Brito (Croatia) Mirjana Lučić (United States) Taylor Townsend
November 5	Équeurdreville, France; Hard (indoor) $25,000; Singles and doubles draws	(Belgium) Alison Van Uytvanck; 6–1, 3–6, 6–3	(France) Julie Coin	(Czech Republic) Petra Cetkovská (Portugal) Maria João Koehler	(Slovenia) Petra Rampre (Poland) Magda Linette (Belgium) Elyne Boeykens (France) Séverine Beltrame
November 5	Équeurdreville, France; Hard (indoor) $25,000; Singles and doubles draws	(Poland) Magda Linette (Poland) Katarzyna Piter; 6–4, 7–6^{(7–4)}	(Switzerland) Amra Sadiković (Croatia) Ana Vrljić	(Czech Republic) Petra Cetkovská (Portugal) Maria João Koehler	(Slovenia) Petra Rampre (Poland) Magda Linette (Belgium) Elyne Boeykens (France) Séverine Beltrame
November 5	Minsk, Belarus; Hard (indoor) $25,000; Singles and doubles draws	(Belarus) Aliaksandra Sasnovich; 6–0, 7–6^{(7–4)}	(Ukraine) Lyudmyla Kichenok	(Ukraine) Kateryna Kozlova (Kazakhstan) Anna Danilina	(Turkey) Pemra Özgen (Belarus) Ekaterina Dzehalevich (Russia) Margarita Gasparyan (Poland) Paula Kania
November 5	Minsk, Belarus; Hard (indoor) $25,000; Singles and doubles draws	(Belarus) Ekaterina Dzehalevich (Belarus) Aliaksandra Sasnovich; 1–6, 6–2, [10–3]	(Ukraine) Lyudmyla Kichenok (Ukraine) Nadiya Kichenok	(Ukraine) Kateryna Kozlova (Kazakhstan) Anna Danilina	(Turkey) Pemra Özgen (Belarus) Ekaterina Dzehalevich (Russia) Margarita Gasparyan (Poland) Paula Kania
November 5	Benicarló, Spain; Clay $25,000; Singles and doubles draws	(Spain) Laura Pous Tió; 6–4, 6–1	(Germany) Dinah Pfizenmaier	(Italy) Karin Knapp (Spain) Estrella Cabeza Candela	(Switzerland) Conny Perrin (Netherlands) Richèl Hogenkamp (Croatia) Iva Mekovec (Germany) Anne Schäfer
November 5	Benicarló, Spain; Clay $25,000; Singles and doubles draws	(Switzerland) Conny Perrin (Slovenia) Maša Zec Peškirič; 6–4, 6–3	(Venezuela) Andrea Gámiz (Spain) Beatriz García Vidagany	(Italy) Karin Knapp (Spain) Estrella Cabeza Candela	(Switzerland) Conny Perrin (Netherlands) Richèl Hogenkamp (Croatia) Iva Mekovec (Germany) Anne Schäfer
November 5	Asunción, Paraguay; Clay $25,000; Singles and doubles draws	(Paraguay) Verónica Cepede Royg; 5–7, 7–6^{(9–7)}, 6–2	(Romania) Raluca Olaru	(Chile) Fernanda Brito (Brazil) Teliana Pereira	(Paraguay) Camila Giangreco Campiz (South Africa) Chanel Simmonds (Argentina) Florencia Molinero (Brazil) Paula Cristina Gonçalves
November 5	Asunción, Paraguay; Clay $25,000; Singles and doubles draws	(Bolivia) María Fernanda Álvarez Terán (South Africa) Chanel Simmonds; 4–6, 6–3, [10–5]	(United States) Anamika Bhargava (United States) Sylvia Krywacz	(Chile) Fernanda Brito (Brazil) Teliana Pereira	(Paraguay) Camila Giangreco Campiz (South Africa) Chanel Simmonds (Argentina) Florencia Molinero (Brazil) Paula Cristina Gonçalves
November 5	Aegon Pro-Series Loughborough; Loughborough, Great Britain; Hard (indoor) $10,000; Singles – Doubles	(Czech Republic) Renata Voráčová; 7–5, 6–7^{(6–8)}, 6–3	(Germany) Julia Kimmelmann	(Romania) Ana Bogdan (Netherlands) Quirine Lemoine	(United Kingdom) Jade Windley (Netherlands) Jade Schoelink (United Kingdom) Francesca Stephenson (United Kingdom) Katie Boulter
November 5	Aegon Pro-Series Loughborough; Loughborough, Great Britain; Hard (indoor) $10,000; Singles – Doubles	(United Kingdom) Anna Fitzpatrick (United Kingdom) Jade Windley; 6–2, 6–2	(Denmark) Karen Barbat (Switzerland) Lara Michel	(Romania) Ana Bogdan (Netherlands) Quirine Lemoine	(United Kingdom) Jade Windley (Netherlands) Jade Schoelink (United Kingdom) Francesca Stephenson (United Kingdom) Katie Boulter
November 5	Antalya, Turkey; Clay $10,000; Singles and doubles draws	(Serbia) Jovana Jakšić; 6–3, 6–1	(Croatia) Ana Konjuh	(Netherlands) Daniëlle Harmsen (Italy) Martina Caregaro	(Ukraine) Ganna Poznikhirenko (Netherlands) Cindy Burger (Austria) Yvonne Neuwirth (Italy) Agnese Zucchini
November 5	Antalya, Turkey; Clay $10,000; Singles and doubles draws	(Hungary) Ágnes Bukta (Czech Republic) Petra Krejsová; Walkover	(Romania) Diana Buzean (Netherlands) Daniëlle Harmsen	(Netherlands) Daniëlle Harmsen (Italy) Martina Caregaro	(Ukraine) Ganna Poznikhirenko (Netherlands) Cindy Burger (Austria) Yvonne Neuwirth (Italy) Agnese Zucchini
November 5	Heraklion, Greece; Carpet $10,000; Singles and doubles draws	(Turkey) Başak Eraydın; 6–4, 6–0	(Germany) Lena-Marie Hofmann	(Poland) Zuzanna Maciejewska (Bulgaria) Borislava Botusharova	(Serbia) Marina Kachar (Serbia) Tamara Čurović (Italy) Angelica Moratelli (Greece) Despoina Vogasari
November 5	Heraklion, Greece; Carpet $10,000; Singles and doubles draws	(Turkey) Başak Eraydın (Australia) Abbie Myers; 6–0, 6–1	(Bulgaria) Borislava Botusharova (Bulgaria) Vivian Zlatanova	(Poland) Zuzanna Maciejewska (Bulgaria) Borislava Botusharova	(Serbia) Marina Kachar (Serbia) Tamara Čurović (Italy) Angelica Moratelli (Greece) Despoina Vogasari
November 5	Guimarães, Portugal; Hard $10,000; Singles and doubles draws	(France) Léa Tholey; 6–3, 6–1	(France) Estelle Cascino	(Italy) Chiara Mendo (Spain) Carmen López Rueda	(Portugal) Bárbara Luz (Liechtenstein) Kathinka von Deichmann (France) Jade Suvrijn (Spain) Arabela Fernández Rabener
November 5	Guimarães, Portugal; Hard $10,000; Singles and doubles draws	(Portugal) Margarida Moura (Portugal) Joana Valle Costa; 7–5, 3–6, [10–7]	(Germany) Stefanie Stemmer (Liechtenstein) Kathinka von Deichmann	(Italy) Chiara Mendo (Spain) Carmen López Rueda	(Portugal) Bárbara Luz (Liechtenstein) Kathinka von Deichmann (France) Jade Suvrijn (Spain) Arabela Fernández Rabener
November 12	Zawada, Poland; Carpet (indoor) $25,000; Singles and doubles draws	(Czech Republic) Karolína Plíšková; 6–3, 6–2	(Croatia) Ana Vrljić	(Belarus) Polina Pekhova (Poland) Paula Kania	(Italy) Corinna Dentoni (Bosnia and Herzegovina) Jasmina Tinjić (Czech Republic) Sandra Záhlavová (Poland) Katarzyna Piter
November 12	Zawada, Poland; Carpet (indoor) $25,000; Singles and doubles draws	(Czech Republic) Karolína Plíšková (Czech Republic) Kristýna Plíšková; 6–3, 6–1	(Germany) Kristina Barrois (Austria) Sandra Klemenschits	(Belarus) Polina Pekhova (Poland) Paula Kania	(Italy) Corinna Dentoni (Bosnia and Herzegovina) Jasmina Tinjić (Czech Republic) Sandra Záhlavová (Poland) Katarzyna Piter
November 12	Helsinki, Finland; Carpet (indoor) $25,000; Singles and doubles draws	(Switzerland) Amra Sadiković; 6–4, 6–0	(Slovakia) Anna Karolína Schmiedlová	(Belgium) An-Sophie Mestach (Russia) Ksenia Lykina	(Estonia) Anett Kontaveit (Slovakia) Zuzana Luknárová (Spain) Arantxa Parra Santonja (Germany) Dinah Pfizenmaier
November 12	Helsinki, Finland; Carpet (indoor) $25,000; Singles and doubles draws	(Ukraine) Lyudmyla Kichenok (Ukraine) Nadiya Kichenok; 6–3, 6–3	(Ukraine) Irina Buryachok (Russia) Valeria Solovyeva	(Belgium) An-Sophie Mestach (Russia) Ksenia Lykina	(Estonia) Anett Kontaveit (Slovakia) Zuzana Luknárová (Spain) Arantxa Parra Santonja (Germany) Dinah Pfizenmaier
November 12	Edgbaston, United Kingdom; Hard (indoor) $10,000; Singles and doubles draws	(Czech Republic) Renata Voráčová; 6–4, 6–2	(United Kingdom) Harriet Dart	(United Kingdom) Jade Windley (United States) Tori Kinard	(Slovakia) Chantal Škamlová (Russia) Marina Melnikova (Germany) Carolin Daniels (United Kingdom) Anna Brogan
November 12	Edgbaston, United Kingdom; Hard (indoor) $10,000; Singles and doubles draws	(United Kingdom) Anna Fitzpatrick (United Kingdom) Jade Windley; 6–2, 6–3	(Czech Republic) Martina Kubičíková (Slovakia) Chantal Škamlová	(United Kingdom) Jade Windley (United States) Tori Kinard	(Slovakia) Chantal Škamlová (Russia) Marina Melnikova (Germany) Carolin Daniels (United Kingdom) Anna Brogan
November 12	Antalya, Turkey; Clay $10,000; Singles and doubles draws	(Hungary) Ágnes Bukta; 6–2, 5–7, 6–3	(Romania) Laura-Ioana Andrei	(Russia) Aminat Kushkhova (Croatia) Ana Konjuh	(Turkey) Hülya Esen (Romania) Raluca Elena Platon (Romania) Patricia Maria Țig (Serbia) Jovana Jakšić
November 12	Antalya, Turkey; Clay $10,000; Singles and doubles draws	(Romania) Laura-Ioana Andrei (Romania) Raluca Elena Platon; 6–4, 3–6, [10–7]	(Turkey) Hülya Esen (Turkey) Lütfiye Esen	(Russia) Aminat Kushkhova (Croatia) Ana Konjuh	(Turkey) Hülya Esen (Romania) Raluca Elena Platon (Romania) Patricia Maria Țig (Serbia) Jovana Jakšić
November 12	Heraklion, Greece; Carpet $10,000; Singles and doubles draws	(France) Manon Arcangioli; 7–6^{(9–7)}, 6–3	(Switzerland) Imane Maëlle Kocher	(Turkey) Başak Eraydın (Germany) Lena-Marie Hofmann	(Switzerland) Corina Jäger (Greece) Valentini Grammatikopoulou (Serbia) Marina Kachar (Serbia) Tamara Čurović
November 12	Heraklion, Greece; Carpet $10,000; Singles and doubles draws	(Turkey) Başak Eraydın (Australia) Abbie Myers; 6–4, 6–4	(Serbia) Tamara Čurović (Russia) Yana Sizikova	(Turkey) Başak Eraydın (Germany) Lena-Marie Hofmann	(Switzerland) Corina Jäger (Greece) Valentini Grammatikopoulou (Serbia) Marina Kachar (Serbia) Tamara Čurović
November 19	Dunlop World Challenge; Toyota, Japan; Carpet (indoor) $75,000+H; Singles – Doubles	(Switzerland) Stefanie Vögele; 7–6^{(7–3)}, 6–4	(Japan) Kimiko Date-Krumm	(Thailand) Tamarine Tanasugarn (United Kingdom) Samantha Murray	(Australia) Casey Dellacqua (Australia) Ashleigh Barty (Japan) Kurumi Nara (Thailand) Nudnida Luangnam
November 19	Dunlop World Challenge; Toyota, Japan; Carpet (indoor) $75,000+H; Singles – Doubles	(Australia) Ashleigh Barty (Australia) Casey Dellacqua; 6–1, 6–2	(Japan) Miki Miyamura (Thailand) Varatchaya Wongteanchai	(Thailand) Tamarine Tanasugarn (United Kingdom) Samantha Murray	(Australia) Casey Dellacqua (Australia) Ashleigh Barty (Japan) Kurumi Nara (Thailand) Nudnida Luangnam
November 19	Vendryně, Czech Republic; Hard (indoor) $15,000; Singles and doubles draws	(Czech Republic) Sandra Záhlavová; 7–6^{(7–1)}, 6–0	(Czech Republic) Renata Voráčová	(Czech Republic) Tereza Smitková (Czech Republic) Jesika Malečková	(Czech Republic) Petra Krejsová (Czech Republic) Eva Rutarová (Slovakia) Lenka Juríková (Czech Republic) Pernilla Mendesová
November 19	Vendryně, Czech Republic; Hard (indoor) $15,000; Singles and doubles draws	(Czech Republic) Jesika Malečková (Czech Republic) Kateřina Vaňková; 7–6^{(7–2)}, 6–2	(Czech Republic) Martina Kubičíková (Czech Republic) Tereza Smitková	(Czech Republic) Tereza Smitková (Czech Republic) Jesika Malečková	(Czech Republic) Petra Krejsová (Czech Republic) Eva Rutarová (Slovakia) Lenka Juríková (Czech Republic) Pernilla Mendesová
November 19	La Vall d'Uixó, Spain; Clay $10,000; Singles and doubles draws	(Spain) Sara Sorribes Tormo; 6–1, 6–1	(Spain) Olga Sáez Larra	(Russia) Yana Sizikova (Italy) Giulia Sussarello	(Spain) Carolina Prats Millán (United Kingdom) Jade Windley (Spain) Yvonne Cavallé Reimers (Spain) Arabela Fernández Rabener
November 19	La Vall d'Uixó, Spain; Clay $10,000; Singles and doubles draws	(Russia) Yana Sizikova (United Kingdom) Jade Windley; 6–4, 6–3	(Austria) Katharina Negrin (Russia) Ksenija Sharifova	(Russia) Yana Sizikova (Italy) Giulia Sussarello	(Spain) Carolina Prats Millán (United Kingdom) Jade Windley (Spain) Yvonne Cavallé Reimers (Spain) Arabela Fernández Rabener
November 19	Antalya, Turkey; Clay $10,000; Singles and doubles draws	(Serbia) Jovana Jakšić; 6–2, 6–0	(Romania) Laura-Ioana Andrei	(Bulgaria) Viktoriya Tomova (Serbia) Natalija Kostić	(Moldova) Anastasia Vdovenco (Georgia (country)) Natia Gegia (Bulgaria) Julia Stamatova (Canada) Elisabeth Fournier
November 19	Antalya, Turkey; Clay $10,000; Singles and doubles draws	(Romania) Elena-Teodora Cadar (Serbia) Natalija Kostić; 6–2, 6–4	(Italy) Georgia Brescia (Germany) Theresa Kleinsteuber	(Bulgaria) Viktoriya Tomova (Serbia) Natalija Kostić	(Moldova) Anastasia Vdovenco (Georgia (country)) Natia Gegia (Bulgaria) Julia Stamatova (Canada) Elisabeth Fournier
November 19	Barranquilla, Colombia; Clay $10,000; Singles and doubles draws	(Chile) Andrea Koch Benvenuto; 7–6^{(7–4)}, 6–0	(Germany) Karolina Nowak	(Peru) Ingrid Várgas Calvo (United States) Nadia Echeverria Alam	(United States) Veronica Corning (Hungary) Naomi Totka (United States) Libby Muma (United States) Blair Shankle
November 19	Barranquilla, Colombia; Clay $10,000; Singles and doubles draws	(United States) Nadia Echeverria Alam (United States) Blair Shankle; 7–5, 7–6^{(7–1)}	(Colombia) María Paulina Pérez (Colombia) Paula Andrea Pérez	(Peru) Ingrid Várgas Calvo (United States) Nadia Echeverria Alam	(United States) Veronica Corning (Hungary) Naomi Totka (United States) Libby Muma (United States) Blair Shankle
November 19	Temuco, Chile; Clay $10,000; Singles and doubles draws	(Argentina) Vanesa Furlanetto; 6–3, 1–0, retired	(Bolivia) María Fernanda Álvarez Terán	(Mexico) Ana Sofía Sánchez (Brazil) Carla Forte	(Chile) Daniela Seguel (Argentina) Carolina Zeballos (Argentina) Carla Lucero (Paraguay) Camila Giangreco Campiz
November 19	Temuco, Chile; Clay $10,000; Singles and doubles draws	(Argentina) Victoria Bosio (Chile) Daniela Seguel; 6–4, 6–2	(Japan) Sachie Ishizu (Guatemala) Daniela Schippers	(Mexico) Ana Sofía Sánchez (Brazil) Carla Forte	(Chile) Daniela Seguel (Argentina) Carolina Zeballos (Argentina) Carla Lucero (Paraguay) Camila Giangreco Campiz
November 26	Antalya, Turkey; Clay $10,000; Singles and doubles draws	(Belgium) Marie Benoît; 6–3, 6–2	(Romania) Laura-Ioana Andrei	(Liechtenstein) Kathinka von Deichmann (Bulgaria) Viktoriya Tomova	(Russia) Aminat Kushkhova (Serbia) Tamara Čurović (Georgia (country)) Sofia Kvatsabaia (Romania) Ana Bogdan
November 26	Antalya, Turkey; Clay $10,000; Singles and doubles draws	(Russia) Eugeniya Pashkova (Ukraine) Anastasiya Vasylyeva; 4–6, 6–3, [10–2]	(Romania) Laura-Ioana Andrei (Austria) Janina Toljan	(Liechtenstein) Kathinka von Deichmann (Bulgaria) Viktoriya Tomova	(Russia) Aminat Kushkhova (Serbia) Tamara Čurović (Georgia (country)) Sofia Kvatsabaia (Romania) Ana Bogdan
November 26	Bangkok, Thailand; Hard $10,000; Singles and doubles draws	(China) Wang Qiang; 6–2, 6–1	(Thailand) Nungnadda Wannasuk	(South Korea) Lee Ye-ra (Austria) Jeannine Prentner	(South Korea) Kim Na-ri (Czech Republic) Tereza Malíková (Germany) Katharina Lehnert (Hong Kong) Venise Chan
November 26	Bangkok, Thailand; Hard $10,000; Singles and doubles draws	(South Korea) Kim Na-ri (South Korea) Lee Ye-ra; 6–1, 4–6, [10–7]	(Thailand) Napatsakorn Sankaew (Chinese Taipei) Yang Chia-hsien	(South Korea) Lee Ye-ra (Austria) Jeannine Prentner	(South Korea) Kim Na-ri (Czech Republic) Tereza Malíková (Germany) Katharina Lehnert (Hong Kong) Venise Chan
November 26	Al Habtoor Tennis Challenge; Dubai, United Arab Emirates; Hard $75,000; Singles – Doubles	(Japan) Kimiko Date-Krumm; 6–1, 3–6, 6–4	(Kazakhstan) Yulia Putintseva	(China) Zhou Yimiao (Czech Republic) Kristýna Plíšková	(Japan) Kurumi Nara (Czech Republic) Karolína Plíšková (Russia) Nina Bratchikova (Ukraine) Elina Svitolina
November 26	Al Habtoor Tennis Challenge; Dubai, United Arab Emirates; Hard $75,000; Singles – Doubles	(Italy) Maria Elena Camerin (Russia) Vera Dushevina; 7–5, 6–3	(Czech Republic) Eva Hrdinová (Czech Republic) Karolína Plíšková	(China) Zhou Yimiao (Czech Republic) Kristýna Plíšková	(Japan) Kurumi Nara (Czech Republic) Karolína Plíšková (Russia) Nina Bratchikova (Ukraine) Elina Svitolina
November 26	Kolkata, India; Hard $10,000; Singles and doubles draws	(Hong Kong) Katherine Ip; 2–6, 6–3, 6–3	(India) Rishika Sunkara	(India) Shweta Rana (India) Prarthana Thombare	(India) Eetee Maheta (India) Ankita Raina (India) Prerna Bhambri (India) Rutuja Bhosale
November 26	Kolkata, India; Hard $10,000; Singles and doubles draws	(India) Arantxa Andrady (India) Kyra Shroff; 6–4, 6–4	(India) Rutuja Bhosale (India) Rishika Sunkara	(India) Shweta Rana (India) Prarthana Thombare	(India) Eetee Maheta (India) Ankita Raina (India) Prerna Bhambri (India) Rutuja Bhosale
November 26	Santiago, Chile; Clay $25,000; Singles and doubles draws	(Brazil) Paula Cristina Gonçalves; 0–6, 6–3, 6–4	(United States) Julia Cohen	(Argentina) María Irigoyen (Paraguay) Verónica Cepede Royg	(Germany) Anne Schäfer (Brazil) Ana-Clara Duarte (Argentina) Catalina Pella (Chile) Macarena Olivares López
November 26	Santiago, Chile; Clay $25,000; Singles and doubles draws	(Argentina) Mailen Auroux (Argentina) María Irigoyen; 6–4, 6–2	(Brazil) Paula Cristina Gonçalves (Brazil) Roxane Vaisemberg	(Argentina) María Irigoyen (Paraguay) Verónica Cepede Royg	(Germany) Anne Schäfer (Brazil) Ana-Clara Duarte (Argentina) Catalina Pella (Chile) Macarena Olivares López
November 26	Jakarta, Indonesia; Hard $10,000; Singles and doubles draws	(Chinese Taipei) Juan Ting-fei; 6–3, 6–2	(Chinese Taipei) Hsu Ching-wen	(Indonesia) Ayu Fani Damayanti (Japan) Akari Inoue	(Japan) Yumi Miyazaki (Japan) Yumi Nakano (Indonesia) Voni Darlina (South Korea) Lee So-ra
November 26	Jakarta, Indonesia; Hard $10,000; Singles and doubles draws	(South Korea) Choi Ji-hee (Japan) Akari Inoue; 6–3, 6–4	(Chinese Taipei) Juan Ting-fei (Japan) Yuka Higuchi	(Indonesia) Ayu Fani Damayanti (Japan) Akari Inoue	(Japan) Yumi Miyazaki (Japan) Yumi Nakano (Indonesia) Voni Darlina (South Korea) Lee So-ra

=== December ===
Week of	Tournament	Winner	Runners-up	Semifinalists	Quarterfinalists
December 3	Antalya, Turkey; Clay $10,000; Singles and doubles draws	(Czech Republic) Denisa Allertová; 5–7, 7–5, 6–1	(Serbia) Natalija Kostić	(Belgium) Marie Benoît (Sweden) Ellen Allgurin	(Ukraine) Anastasiya Vasylyeva (Romania) Ilka Csöregi (France) Clothilde de Bernardi (Romania) Ioana Loredana Roșca
December 3	Antalya, Turkey; Clay $10,000; Singles and doubles draws	(Russia) Yuliya Kalabina (Belarus) Sviatlana Pirazhenka; 6–3, 7–5	(France) Manon Arcangioli (France) Laëtitia Sarrazin	(Belgium) Marie Benoît (Sweden) Ellen Allgurin	(Ukraine) Anastasiya Vasylyeva (Romania) Ilka Csöregi (France) Clothilde de Bernardi (Romania) Ioana Loredana Roșca
December 3	Bangkok, Thailand; Hard $10,000; Singles and doubles draws	(China) Wang Qiang; 4–6, 6–3, 6–4	(China) Wen Xin	(South Korea) Lee Ye-ra (Japan) Shiho Akita	(Ukraine) Oleksandra Korashvili (China) Tang Haochen (Thailand) Nungnadda Wannasuk (China) Wang Yafan
December 3	Bangkok, Thailand; Hard $10,000; Singles and doubles draws	(China) Wang Yafan (China) Wen Xin; 7–5, 7–5	(South Korea) Kim Na-ri (South Korea) Lee Ye-ra	(South Korea) Lee Ye-ra (Japan) Shiho Akita	(Ukraine) Oleksandra Korashvili (China) Tang Haochen (Thailand) Nungnadda Wannasuk (China) Wang Yafan
December 3	Potchefstroom, South Africa; Hard $10,000; Singles and doubles draws	(South Africa) Chanel Simmonds; 6–1, 6–4	(Israel) Keren Shlomo	(Madagascar) Zarah Razafimahatratra (South Africa) Lynn Kiro	(France) Estelle Cascino (Serbia) Vanja Klarić (Israel) Lee Or (France) Léa Tholey
December 3	Potchefstroom, South Africa; Hard $10,000; Singles and doubles draws	(Germany) Kim Grajdek (Israel) Keren Shlomo; 2–6, 6–4, [10–8]	(South Africa) Lynn Kiro (Madagascar) Zarah Razafimahatratra	(Madagascar) Zarah Razafimahatratra (South Africa) Lynn Kiro	(France) Estelle Cascino (Serbia) Vanja Klarić (Israel) Lee Or (France) Léa Tholey
December 3	Jakarta, Indonesia; Hard $10,000; Singles and doubles draws	(China) Lu Jiajing; 1–6, 6–4, 7–5	(Indonesia) Ayu Fani Damayanti	(Japan) Yuka Higuchi (Japan) Akari Inoue	(Japan) Yumi Miyazaki (Indonesia) Lavinia Tananta (Chinese Taipei) Hsu Ching-wen (Japan) Yumi Nakano
December 3	Jakarta, Indonesia; Hard $10,000; Singles and doubles draws	(Indonesia) Ayu Fani Damayanti (Indonesia) Lavinia Tananta; 6–3, 6–7^{(9–11)}, [10–6]	(China) Lu Jiajing (China) Lu Jiaxiang	(Japan) Yuka Higuchi (Japan) Akari Inoue	(Japan) Yumi Miyazaki (Indonesia) Lavinia Tananta (Chinese Taipei) Hsu Ching-wen (Japan) Yumi Nakano
December 10	Antalya, Turkey; Clay $10,000; Singles and doubles draws	(Russia) Victoria Kan; 6–3, 7–5	(Ukraine) Anastasiya Vasylyeva	(France) Irina Ramialison (Romania) Ioana Loredana Roșca	(Russia) Daria Mironova (Russia) Tamara Bizhukova (Czech Republic) Kateřina Kramperová (Kyrgyzstan) Ksenia Palkina
December 10	Antalya, Turkey; Clay $10,000; Singles and doubles draws	(Belgium) Justine De Sutter (United States) Katerina Stewart; 7–5, 6–4	(Romania) Irina Maria Bara (Romania) Ioana Loredana Roșca	(France) Irina Ramialison (Romania) Ioana Loredana Roșca	(Russia) Daria Mironova (Russia) Tamara Bizhukova (Czech Republic) Kateřina Kramperová (Kyrgyzstan) Ksenia Palkina
December 10	Bangkok, Thailand; Hard $10,000; Singles and doubles draws	(Thailand) Nungnadda Wannasuk; 6–3, 6–1	(China) Wang Yafan	(Israel) Deniz Khazaniuk (Ukraine) Oleksandra Korashvili	(Japan) Mana Ayukawa (Germany) Katharina Lehnert (Hong Kong) Wu Ho-ching (Hong Kong) Venise Chan
December 10	Bangkok, Thailand; Hard $10,000; Singles and doubles draws	(China) Wang Yafan (China) Wen Xin; 6–0, 6–3	(Vietnam) Huỳnh Phương Đài Trang (China) Li Yihong	(Israel) Deniz Khazaniuk (Ukraine) Oleksandra Korashvili	(Japan) Mana Ayukawa (Germany) Katharina Lehnert (Hong Kong) Wu Ho-ching (Hong Kong) Venise Chan
December 10	Djibouti, Djibouti; Hard $10,000; Singles and doubles draws	(Russia) Yana Sizikova; 6–2, 4–6, 6–4	(Italy) Anna Floris	(Austria) Melanie Klaffner (Bosnia and Herzegovina) Anita Husarić	(India) Shweta Rana (France) Chloé Paquet (France) Amandine Hesse (Russia) Margarita Lazareva
December 10	Djibouti, Djibouti; Hard $10,000; Singles and doubles draws	(Ukraine) Diana Bogoliy (Russia) Yana Sizikova; 6–3, 3–6, [10–8]	(France) Amandine Hesse (France) Chloé Paquet	(Austria) Melanie Klaffner (Bosnia and Herzegovina) Anita Husarić	(India) Shweta Rana (France) Chloé Paquet (France) Amandine Hesse (Russia) Margarita Lazareva
December 10	Potchefstroom, South Africa; Hard $10,000; Singles and doubles draws	(Madagascar) Zarah Razafimahatratra; 7–6^{(7–5)}, 6–0	(France) Estelle Cascino	(South Africa) Ilze Hattingh (United States) Stephanie Kent	(South Africa) Chanel Simmonds (France) Léa Tholey (Zimbabwe) Valeria Bhunu (South Africa) Lynn Kiro
December 10	Potchefstroom, South Africa; Hard $10,000; Singles and doubles draws	(South Africa) Lynn Kiro (Madagascar) Zarah Razafimahatratra; Walkover	(Germany) Kim Grajdek (Israel) Keren Shlomo	(South Africa) Ilze Hattingh (United States) Stephanie Kent	(South Africa) Chanel Simmonds (France) Léa Tholey (Zimbabwe) Valeria Bhunu (South Africa) Lynn Kiro
December 17	Antalya, Turkey; Clay $10,000; Singles and doubles draws	(France) Irina Ramialison; 6–1, 2–6, 6–0	(Bulgaria) Isabella Shinikova	(France) Manon Arcangioli (Russia) Victoria Kan	(Russia) Tamara Bizhukova (Turkey) Hülya Esen (United States) Katerina Stewart (France) Clothilde de Bernardi
December 17	Antalya, Turkey; Clay $10,000; Singles and doubles draws	(Italy) Anastasia Grymalska (Bulgaria) Julia Stamatova; 6–2, 3–6, [10–8]	(Belgium) Justine De Sutter (United States) Katerina Stewart	(France) Manon Arcangioli (Russia) Victoria Kan	(Russia) Tamara Bizhukova (Turkey) Hülya Esen (United States) Katerina Stewart (France) Clothilde de Bernardi
December 17	Ankara Cup; Ankara, Turkey; Hard (indoor) $50,000; Singles – Doubles	(Croatia) Ana Savić; 5–7, 6–3, 6–4	(Puerto Rico) Monica Puig	(Russia) Marta Sirotkina (Serbia) Aleksandra Krunić	(Luxembourg) Mandy Minella (Montenegro) Danka Kovinić (Russia) Margarita Gasparyan (Uzbekistan) Akgul Amanmuradova
December 17	Ankara Cup; Ankara, Turkey; Hard (indoor) $50,000; Singles – Doubles	(Poland) Magda Linette (Poland) Katarzyna Piter; 6–2, 6–2	(Ukraine) Irina Buryachok (Russia) Valeria Solovyeva	(Russia) Marta Sirotkina (Serbia) Aleksandra Krunić	(Luxembourg) Mandy Minella (Montenegro) Danka Kovinić (Russia) Margarita Gasparyan (Uzbekistan) Akgul Amanmuradova
December 17	Djibouti, Djibouti; Hard $10,000; Singles and doubles draws	(Austria) Melanie Klaffner; 4–6, 7–5, 6–2	(France) Amandine Hesse	(Italy) Anna Floris (Russia) Margarita Lazareva	(India) Shweta Rana (France) Chloé Paquet (Russia) Yana Sizikova (Ukraine) Diana Bogoliy
December 17	Djibouti, Djibouti; Hard $10,000; Singles and doubles draws	(Ukraine) Diana Bogoliy (Russia) Yana Sizikova; 5–7, 6–4, [10–4]	(France) Amandine Hesse (France) Chloé Paquet	(Italy) Anna Floris (Russia) Margarita Lazareva	(India) Shweta Rana (France) Chloé Paquet (Russia) Yana Sizikova (Ukraine) Diana Bogoliy
December 24	Istanbul, Turkey; Hard (indoor) $10,000; Singles and doubles draws	(Bulgaria) Isabella Shinikova; 6–4, 6–2	(Turkey) İpek Soylu	(Turkey) Hülya Esen (Bulgaria) Borislava Botusharova	(Czech Republic) Sandra Hönigová (Russia) Polina Leykina (Georgia (country)) Sofia Kvatsabaia (Japan) Eri Hozumi
December 24	Istanbul, Turkey; Hard (indoor) $10,000; Singles and doubles draws	(Belarus) Lidziya Marozava (Russia) Ekaterina Yashina; 6–3, 6–2	(Georgia (country)) Ekaterine Gorgodze (Georgia (country)) Sofia Kvatsabaia	(Turkey) Hülya Esen (Bulgaria) Borislava Botusharova	(Czech Republic) Sandra Hönigová (Russia) Polina Leykina (Georgia (country)) Sofia Kvatsabaia (Japan) Eri Hozumi
December 24	Saint Petersburg, Russia; Carpet (indoor) $10,000; Singles and doubles draws	(Russia) Regina Kulikova; 6–0, 5–7, 6–4	(Ukraine) Anastasiya Vasylyeva	(Russia) Yuliya Kalabina (Russia) Alina Silich	(Belarus) Ekaterina Dzehalevich (Ukraine) Ganna Piven (Russia) Ksenia Kirillova (Russia) Anastasia Frolova
December 24	Saint Petersburg, Russia; Carpet (indoor) $10,000; Singles and doubles draws	(Russia) Alexandra Artamonova (Belarus) Ekaterina Dzehalevich; 6–0, 6–2	(Russia) Yuliya Kalabina (Ukraine) Anastasiya Vasylyeva	(Russia) Yuliya Kalabina (Russia) Alina Silich	(Belarus) Ekaterina Dzehalevich (Ukraine) Ganna Piven (Russia) Ksenia Kirillova (Russia) Anastasia Frolova
December 24	Pune, India; Hard $25,000; Singles and doubles draws	(Slovenia) Tadeja Majerič; 6–2, 6–4	(Turkey) Başak Eraydın	(Russia) Nina Bratchikova (Israel) Keren Shlomo	(Thailand) Noppawan Lertcheewakarn (China) Sun Shengnan (China) Lu Jiajing (Belarus) Ilona Kremen
December 24	Pune, India; Hard $25,000; Singles and doubles draws	(Slovenia) Tadeja Majerič (Switzerland) Conny Perrin; 3–6, 7–5, [10–6]	(China) Lu Jiajing (China) Lu Jiaxiang	(Russia) Nina Bratchikova (Israel) Keren Shlomo	(Thailand) Noppawan Lertcheewakarn (China) Sun Shengnan (China) Lu Jiajing (Belarus) Ilona Kremen

== See also ==
- 2012 WTA Tour
- 2012 WTA 125K series
- 2012 ATP World Tour
- 2012 ATP Challenger Tour
- 2012 ITF Women's Circuit
- 2012 ITF Men's Circuit
- Women's Tennis Association
- International Tennis Federation
