= Monica Puig career statistics =

Statistics of American tennis player

Career finals
Discipline	Type	Won	Lost	Total	WR
Singles	Grand Slam	–	–	–	–
Singles	Summer Olympics	1	0	1	1.00
Singles	WTA Finals (Note: Formerly known as: Virginia Slims Championships (until 1995); WTA Tour Championships (until 2014))	–	–	–	–
Singles	WTA Elite (Note: Elite tier: WTA Tournament of Champions (2009–14); WTA Elite Trophy (2015–present))				
Singles	WTA 1000 (Note: Formerly known as: Category 4 & 5 & 6 (until 1990); Tier I (until 2009); WTA Premier Mandatory and 5 (until 2021))	–	–	–	–
Singles	WTA 500 (Note: Formerly known as: Category 3 (until 1990); Tier II (until 2009); WTA Premier (until 2021))	0	1	1	0.00
Singles	WTA 250 (Note: Formerly known as: Category 1 & 2 (until 1990); Tier III & IV & V (until 2009); WTA International (until 2021))	1	1	2	0.50
Singles	Total	2	2	4	0.50
Doubles	Grand Slam	–	–	–	–
Doubles	Summer Olympics	–	–	–	–
Doubles	WTA Finals	–	–	–	–
Doubles	WTA Elite	–	–	–	–
Doubles	WTA 1000	–	–	–	–
Doubles	WTA 500	–	–	–	–
Doubles	WTA 250	–	–	–	–
Doubles	Total	–	–	–	–
Total		2	2	4	0.50

This is a list of career statistics of Puerto Rican professional tennis player Monica Puig since her professional debut in September 2010. Puig won one WTA Tour singles title, plus the gold medal in the women's singles tournament at the 2016 Summer Olympics.

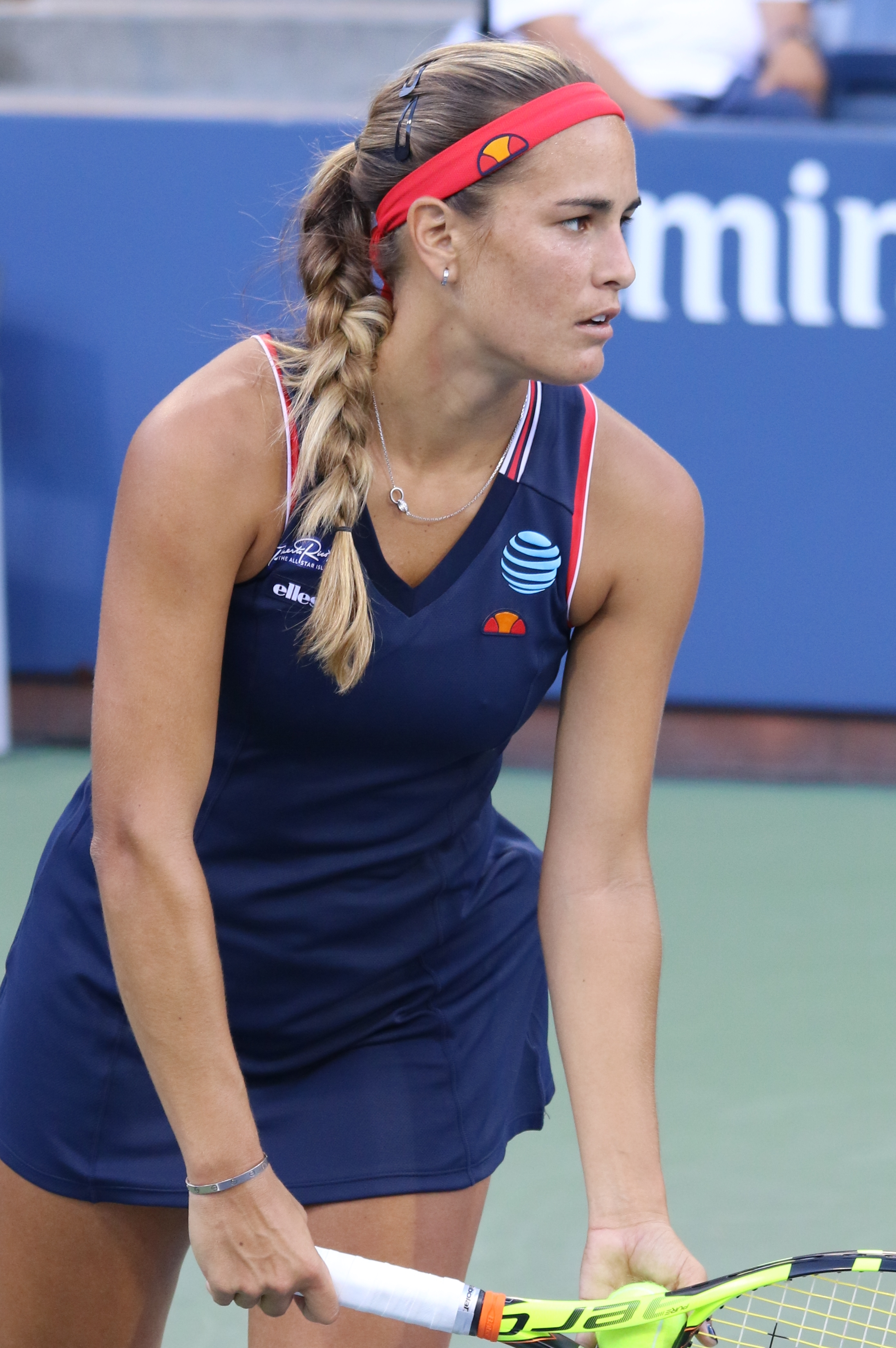
Puig at the 2016 US Open

== Performance timelines ==
Key
W	F	SF	QF	#R	RR	Q#	P#	DNQ	A	Z#	PO	G	S	B	NMS	NTI	P	NH

(W) winner; (F) finalist; (SF) semifinalist; (QF) quarterfinalist; (#R) rounds 4, 3, 2, 1; (RR) round-robin stage; (Q#) qualification round; (P#) preliminary round; (DNQ) did not qualify; (A) absent; (Z#) Davis/Fed Cup Zonal Group (with number indication) or (PO) play-off; (G) gold, (S) silver or (B) bronze Olympic/Paralympic medal; (NMS) not a Masters tournament; (NTI) not a Tier I tournament; (P) postponed; (NH) not held; (SR) strike rate (events won / competed); (W–L) win–loss record.
To avoid confusion and double counting, these charts are updated at the conclusion of a tournament or when the player's participation has ended.

Only main-draw results in WTA Tour, Grand Slam tournaments, Billie Jean King Cup (Fed Cup), Hopman Cup and Olympic Games are included in win–loss records.

=== Singles ===
Current through the 2022 Madrid Open.

Tournament	2011	2012	2013	2014	2015	2016	2017	2018	2019	2020	2021	2022	SR	W–L	Win %
Grand Slam tournaments
Australian Open	A	Q2	Q1	2R	2R	3R	2R	2R	1R	A	A	A	0 / 6	6–6	50%
French Open	A	Q3	3R	1R	1R	3R	2R	A	3R	1R	A	A	0 / 7	7–7	50%
Wimbledon	A	A	4R	1R	1R	1R	1R	1R	2R	NH	A	A	0 / 7	4–7	36%
US Open	A	Q1	1R	2R	1R	1R	1R	2R	1R	1R	A	A	0 / 8	2–8	20%
Win–loss	0–0	0–0	5–3	2–4	1–4	4–4	2–4	2–3	3–4	0–0	0–0	0–0	0 / 28	19–28	40%
National representation
Summer Olympics	NH	A	NH			G	NH				A		1 / 1	6–0	100%
WTA 1000
Dubai / Qatar Open	A	A	A	A	1R	A	3R	A	A	A	A	A	0 / 2	2–2	50%
Indian Wells Open	Q2	Q2	1R	1R	2R	3R	2R	2R	2R	NH	A	A	0 / 7	6–7	46%
Miami Open	A	A	1R	2R	1R	2R	1R	4R	1R	NH	A	A	0 / 7	5–7	42%
Madrid Open	A	A	A	Q1	1R	1R	1R	2R	Q1	NH	A	1R	0 / 5	1–5	17%
Italian Open	A	A	A	2R	1R	2R	1R	Q2	Q2	NH	A		0 / 4	2–4	33%
Canadian Open	A	A	A	1R	2R	1R	A	2R	Q2	NH	A		0 / 4	1–4	20%
Cincinnati Open	A	A	1R	Q2	Q1	A	1R	Q1	1R	Q1	A		0 / 3	0–3	0%
Pan Pacific / Wuhan Open	A	A	1R	1R	Q1	1R	3R	QF	2R	NH			0 / 6	6–6	50%
China Open	A	A	1R	Q2	2R	1R	Q2	Q1	1R	NH			0 / 4	1–4	25%
Career statistics
	2011	2012	2013	2014	2015	2016	2017	2018	2019	2020	2021	2022	SR	W–L	Win %
Tournaments	1	2	15	19	23	25	21	14	19	2	0	1	Career total: 142		
Titles	0	0	0	1	0	1	0	0	0	0	0	0	Career total: 2		
Finals	0	0	0	1	0	2	1	0	0	0	0	0	Career total: 4		
Overall win–loss	0–1	0–2	13–15	16–18	15–23	41–24	20–21	18–14	17–19	0–2	0–0	0–1	2 / 142	140–140	50%
Win (%)	0%	0%	46%	47%	39%	63%	49%	56%	47%	0%	–	0%	Career total: 50%		
Year-end ranking	228	127	55	60	92	32	58	53	80				$3,542,293		

=== Doubles ===
Tournament	2013	2014	2015	2016	2017	2018	2019	2020	SR	W–L
Grand Slam tournaments
Australian Open	A	1R	1R	A	1R	2R	1R	A	0 / 5	1–5
French Open	A	1R	1R	1R	A	A	2R	A	0 / 4	1–4
Wimbledon	1R	1R	A	2R	A	1R	1R	NH	0 / 5	1–5
US Open	1R	1R	A	1R	A	A	1R	A	0 / 4	0–4
Win–loss	0–2	0–4	0–2	1–3	0–1	1–2	1–4	0–0	0 / 18	3–18

== Significant finals ==
=== Olympic Games ===
==== Singles: 1 (gold medal) ====
Result	Year	Tournament	Surface	Opponent	Score
Gold	2016	Rio Summer Olympics	Hard	(Germany) Angelique Kerber	6–4, 4–6, 6–1

== WTA Tour finals ==
=== Singles: 4 (2 titles, 2 runner-ups) ===
Legend Summer Olympics (1–0) WTA 500 (Premier) (0–1) WTA 250 (International) (1–1)	Finals by surface Hard (1–2) Clay (1–0)

Result	W–L	Date	Tournament	Tier	Surface	Opponent	Score
Win	1–0	May 2014	Internationaux de Strasbourg, France	International	Clay	(Spain) Sílvia Soler Espinosa	6–4, 6–3
Loss	1–1	Jan 2016	Sydney International, Australia	Premier	Hard	(Russia) Svetlana Kuznetsova	0–6, 2–6
Win	2–1	Aug 2016	Summer Olympics Rio, Brazil	Olympics	Hard	(Germany) Angelique Kerber	6–4, 4–6, 6–1
Loss	2–2	Oct 2017	Luxembourg Open, Luxembourg	International	Hard	(Germany) Carina Witthöft	3–6, 5–7

== ITF Circuit finals ==
=== Singles: 10 (6 titles, 4 runner-ups) ===
Legend $100,000 tournaments $50,000 tournaments $25,000 tournaments $10,000 tournaments	Finals by surface Hard (4–3) Clay (2–1)

Result	W–L	Date	Tournament	Tier	Surface	Opponent	Score
Win	1–0	Apr 2010	ITF Torrent, Spain	10,000	Clay	(Russia) Nanuli Pipiya	3–6, 6–1, 6–2
Win	2–0	Feb 2011	ITF Surprise, United States	25,000	Hard	(Slovakia) Lenka Wienerová	6–4, 6–0
Win	3–0	May 2011	Chiasso Open, Switzerland	25,000	Clay	(Czech Republic) Andrea Hlaváčková	7–6^{(7–4)}, 7–5
Win	4–0	Aug 2011	ITF San Luis Potosí, Mexico	10,000	Hard	(Russia) Nika Kukharchuk	6–3, 6–0
Loss	4–1	Oct 2011	ITF Bayamón, Puerto Rico	25,000	Hard	(Portugal) Michelle Larcher de Brito	3–6, 2–6
Loss	4–2	Mar 2012	ITF Poza Rica, Mexico	25,000	Hard	(Kazakhstan) Yaroslava Shvedova	1–6, 2–6
Loss	4–3	Jun 2012	ITF Périgueux, France	25,000	Clay	(Russia) Irina Khromacheva	3–6, 2–6
Win	5–3	Oct 2012	Open de Touraine, France	50,000	Hard (i)	(Portugal) Maria João Koehler	3–6, 6–4, 6–1
Win	6–3	Oct 2012	ITF Poitiers, France	100,000	Hard (i)	(Russia) Elena Vesnina	7–5, 1–6, 7–5
Loss	6–4	Dec 2012	Ankara Cup, Turkey	50,000	Hard (i)	(Croatia) Ana Savić	7–5, 3–6, 4–6

=== Doubles: 1 (runner-up) ===
Legend $100,000 tournaments	Finals by surface Clay (0–1)

Result	W–L	Date	Tournament	Tier	Surface	Partner	Opponents	Score
Loss	0–1	Jul 2012	Open de Biarritz, France	100,000	Clay	(Spain) Lara Arruabarrena	(France) Séverine Beltrame (France) Laura Thorpe	2–6, 3–6

== Regional championship medal matches ==
=== Central American and Caribbean Games ===
==== Singles: 3 (3 gold medals) ====
Result	Year	Host nation	Surface	Opponents	Score
Gold	2010	Puerto Rico	Hard	(Venezuela) Adriana Pérez	6–3, 6–2
Gold	2014	Mexico	Hard	(Mexico) Ana Sofía Sánchez	6–2, 6–1
Gold	2018	Colombia	Hard	(Colombia) Mariana Duque Mariño	6–1, 6–1

==== Women's doubles: 1 (bronze medal) ====
Result	Year	Host nation	Surface	Partner	Opponents	Score
Bronze	2018	Colombia	Hard	(Puerto Rico) Mónica Matías	(The Bahamas) Simone Pratt (The Bahamas) Danielle Thompson	6–2, 6–0

==== Mixed doubles: 1 (bronze medal) ====
Result	Year	Host nation	Surface	Partner	Opponents	Score
Bronze	2010	Puerto Rico	Hard	(Puerto Rico) Alex Llompart	(Dominican Republic) Chandra Capozzi (Dominican Republic) José Hernández-Fernández	Tied

=== Pan American Games ===
==== Singles: 2 (1 silver medal, 1 bronze medal) ====
Result	Year	Host nation	Surface	Opponents	Score
Silver	2011	Mexico	Hard	(United States) Irina Falconi	3–6, 2–6
Bronze	2015	Toronto	Hard	(United States) Lauren Davis	2–6, 6–3, 6–3

== Junior Grand Slam tournament finals ==
=== Girls' singles: 2 (2 runner-ups) ===
Result	Year	Tournament	Surface	Opponent	Score
Loss	2011	Australian Open	Hard	(Belgium) An-Sophie Mestach	4–6, 2–6
Loss	2011	French Open	Clay	(Tunisia) Ons Jabeur	6–7^{(8–10)}, 1–6

== Top 10 wins ==
Season	2013	...	2016	2017	2018	2019	2020	Total
Wins	1		2	0	3	1	0	7

#	Player	Rank	Event	Surface	Round	Score	Rank
2013
1.	(Italy) Sara Errani	5	Wimbledon, UK	Grass	1R	6–3, 6–2	65
2016
2.	(Spain) Garbiñe Muguruza	4	Summer Olympics, Rio	Hard	3R	6–1, 6–1	34
3.	(Germany) Angelique Kerber	2	Summer Olympics, Rio	Hard	F	6–4, 4–6, 6–1	34
2018
4.	(Denmark) Caroline Wozniacki	2	Miami Open, United States	Hard	2R	0–6, 6–4, 6–4	82
5.	(France) Caroline Garcia	6	Connecticut Open, U.S.	Hard	QF	7–5, 1–6, 6–2	72
6.	(Denmark) Caroline Wozniacki	2	Wuhan Open, China	Hard	3R	7–6^{(12–10)}, 7–5	51
2019
7.	(Belarus) Aryna Sabalenka	10	Charleston Open, U.S.	Clay	3R	6–2, 7–5	63

== See also ==
- List of Puerto Ricans
- Sports in Puerto Rico
- Puerto Rico at the Olympics
