= 2011 Ankara Cup =

- Date: 19–24 December
- Edition: 1st
- Surface: Hard (indoor)
- Location: Ankara, Turkey

Champions

Singles
- (France) Kristina Mladenovic

Doubles
- (Russia) Nina Bratchikova / (Croatia) Darija Jurak
- Ankara Cup

The 2011 Ankara Cup was a professional tennis tournament played on indoor hard courts. It was the first edition of the tournament which was part of the 2011 ITF Women's Circuit. It took place in Ankara, Turkey on 19–24 December 2011.

== WTA entrants ==
=== Seeds ===
Country	Player	Rank^{1}	Seed
FRA	Stéphanie Foretz Gacon	102	1
ROU	Alexandra Cadanțu	109	2
RUS	Valeria Savinykh	135	3
RUS	Nina Bratchikova	145	4
FRA	Caroline Garcia	147	5
FRA	Kristina Mladenovic	154	6
ROU	Mihaela Buzărnescu	160	7
ROU	Mădălina Gojnea	187	8

- ^{1} Rankings are as of 12 December 2011

=== Other entrants ===
The following players received wildcards into the singles main draw:

- (Turkey) Başak Eraydın
- (Turkey) Sultan Gönen
- (Turkey) Naz Karagöz
- (Turkey) İpek Soylu

The following players received entry from the qualifying draw:

- (Romania) Laura-Ioana Andrei
- (Georgia (country)) Oksana Kalashnikova
- (Russia) Marina Melnikova
- (Russia) Ekaterina Yashina

The following players received entry by a lucky loser spot:

- (Georgia (country)) Ekaterine Gorgodze
- (Belarus) Polina Pekhova

The following player received entry by a Special Ranking spot:

- (Hungary) Katalin Marosi

== Champions ==
=== Singles ===
- (France) Kristina Mladenovic def. (Russia) Valeria Savinykh, 7–5, 5–7, 6–1

=== Doubles ===
- (Russia) Nina Bratchikova / (Croatia) Darija Jurak def. (Slovakia) Janette Husárová / (Hungary) Katalin Marosi, 6–4, 6–2
