= 2012 Ankara Cup =

- Date: 17–23 December
- Edition: 2nd
- Category: ITF Women's Circuit
- Prize money: $50,000
- Surface: Hard (indoor)
- Location: Ankara, Turkey

Champions

Singles
- (Croatia) Ana Savić

Doubles
- (Poland) Magda Linette / (Poland) Katarzyna Piter
- Ankara Cup

The 2012 Ankara Cup was a professional tennis tournament played on indoor hard courts. It was the second edition of the tournament which was part of the 2012 ITF Women's Circuit. It took place in Ankara, Turkey, on 17–23 December 2012.

== Singles entrants ==
=== Seeds ===
Country	Player	Rank^{1}	Seed
LUX	Mandy Minella	77	1
PUR	Monica Puig	133	2
GER	Dinah Pfizenmaier	141	3
RUS	Valeria Savinykh	148	4
RUS	Marta Sirotkina	159	5
USA	Chiara Scholl	170	6
SRB	Aleksandra Krunić	171	7
TUR	Çağla Büyükakçay	174	8

- ^{1} Rankings as of 10 December 2012

=== Other entrants ===
The following players received wildcards into the singles main draw:

- (Turkey) Başak Eraydın
- (Turkey) Sultan Gönen
- (Turkey) Pemra Özgen
- (Turkey) İpek Soylu

The following players received entry from the qualifying draw:

- (Uzbekistan) Nigina Abduraimova
- (Germany) Kristina Barrois
- (Russia) Yuliya Kalabina
- (Croatia) Ana Savić

The following players received entry into the singles main draw as lucky losers:

- (Tunisia) Ons Jabeur
- (Montenegro) Danka Kovinić

The following player received entry by a Protected Ranking:

- (Georgia (country)) Oksana Kalashnikova

== Champions ==
=== Singles ===
- (Croatia) Ana Savić def. (Puerto Rico) Monica Puig 5–7, 6–3, 6–4

=== Doubles ===
- (Poland) Magda Linette / (Poland) Katarzyna Piter def. (Ukraine) Irina Buryachok / (Russia) Valeria Solovyeva 6–2, 6–2
