= 2011 Ankara Cup – Doubles =

Doubles
- 2011 Ankara Cup

Final
- Champions: (Russia) Nina Bratchikova (Croatia) Darija Jurak
- Runners-up: (Slovakia) Janette Husárová (Hungary) Katalin Marosi
- Score: 6–4, 6–2

Events
Singles	Doubles
← 2010 ·	Ankara Cup	· 2012 →

The doubles of the 2011 Ankara Cup - the first edition of the tournament - was won by Nina Bratchikova and Darija Jurak, who defeated Janette Husárová and Katalin Marosi in the final, 6–4, 6–2.

== Seeds ==
1. (Russia) Nina Bratchikova / (Croatia) Darija Jurak (champions)
2. (Ukraine) Olga Savchuk / (Turkey) İpek Şenoğlu (first round)
3. (Slovakia) Janette Husárová / (Hungary) Katalin Marosi (final)
4. (Ukraine) Yulia Beygelzimer / (Russia) Valeria Savinykh (first round)

== Draw ==
=== Key ===
- Q = Qualifier
- WC = Wild card
- LL = Lucky loser
- Alt = Alternate
- SE = Special exempt
- PR = Protected ranking
- ITF = ITF entry
- JE = Junior exempt
- w/o = Walkover
- r = Retired
- d = Defaulted
- SR = Special ranking

First round
1	(Russia) N Bratchikova (Croatia) D Jurak	6	2	[10]
(Turkey) H Esen (Turkey) L Esen	4	6	[2]
(Romania) L-I Andrei (Romania) M Buzărnescu	6	6
WC	(Turkey) S Gönen (Turkey) İ Soylu	1	0
4	(Ukraine) Y Beygelzimer (Russia) V Savinykh	6	6^{6}	[10]
(Ukraine) I Buryachok (Switzerland) A Sadiković	4	7^{8}	[12]
WC	(Armenia) A Amiraghyan (Turkey) B Eraydın	1	1
(Austria) S Klemenschits (Luxembourg) A Kremer	6	6
(Belarus) S Pirazhenka (Ukraine) A Vasylyeva	6	6
(Japan) C Takayama (Russia) E Yashina	4	2
(Georgia (country)) S Kvatsabaia (Ukraine) E Svitolina	2	0
3	(Slovakia) J Husárová (Hungary) K Marosi	6	6
(Russia) M Melnikova (Belarus) P Pekhova	6	6
(Georgia (country)) E Gorgodze (Georgia (country)) S Shapatava	1	1
(France) V Larrière (France) K Mladenovic	6	7
2	(Ukraine) O Savchuk (Turkey) I Şenoğlu	2	5

Quarterfinals
1	(Russia) N Bratchikova (Croatia) D Jurak	7	6
(Romania) L-I Andrei (Romania) M Buzărnescu	5	4
(Ukraine) I Buryachok (Switzerland) A Sadiković	6	6^{6}	[10]
(Austria) S Klemenschits (Luxembourg) A Kremer	4	7^{8}	[5]
(Belarus) S Pirazhenka (Ukraine) A Vasylyeva	2	2
3	(Slovakia) J Husárová (Hungary) K Marosi	6	6
(Russia) M Melnikova (Belarus) P Pekhova	6	1	[3]
(France) V Larrière (France) K Mladenovic	4	6	[10]

Semifinals
1	(Russia) N Bratchikova (Croatia) D Jurak	6	7
(Ukraine) I Buryachok (Switzerland) A Sadiković	4	5
3	(Slovakia) J Husárová (Hungary) K Marosi	7^{7}	7^{7}
(France) V Larrière (France) K Mladenovic	6^{5}	6^{4}

Final
1	(Russia) N Bratchikova (Croatia) D Jurak	6	6
3	(Slovakia) J Husárová (Hungary) K Marosi	4	2
