= 2011 Ankara Cup – Singles =

Singles
- 2011 Ankara Cup

Final
- Champion: (France) Kristina Mladenovic
- Runner-up: (Russia) Valeria Savinykh
- Score: 7–5, 5–7, 6–1

Events
Singles	Doubles
← 2010 ·	Ankara Cup	· 2012 →

This was the first edition of the tournament.

Kristina Mladenovic won the title, defeating Valeria Savinykh in the final, 7–5, 5–7, 6–1.

== Seeds ==
1. (France) Stéphanie Foretz Gacon (first round)
2. (Romania) Alexandra Cadanțu (first round)
3. (Russia) Valeria Savinykh (final)
4. (Russia) Nina Bratchikova (first round)
5. (France) Caroline Garcia (quarterfinals)
6. (France) Kristina Mladenovic (champion)
7. (Romania) Mihaela Buzărnescu (quarterfinals)
8. (Romania) Mădălina Gojnea (second round)

== Draw ==
=== Key ===
- Q = Qualifier
- WC = Wild card
- LL = Lucky loser
- Alt = Alternate
- SE = Special exempt
- PR = Protected ranking
- ITF = ITF entry
- JE = Junior exempt
- w/o = Walkover
- r = Retired
- d = Defaulted
- SR = Special ranking

=== Finals ===
Semifinals
(Ukraine) Elina Svitolina	2	3
6	(France) Kristina Mladenovic	6	6
3	(Russia) Valeria Savinykh	6^{3}	6	6
(Netherlands) Kiki Bertens	7^{7}	1	2

Final
6	(France) Kristina Mladenovic	7	5	6
3	(Russia) Valeria Savinykh	5	7	1

=== Top half ===
First round
1	(France) S Foretz Gacon	2	5
(Ukraine) E Svitolina	6	7
Q	(Russia) M Melnikova	4	1
(Ukraine) O Savchuk	6	6
(Ukraine) T Arefyeva	2	3
(Switzerland) A Sadiković	6	6
WC	(Turkey) S Gönen	3	4
8	(Romania) M Gojnea	6	6
4	(Russia) N Bratchikova	5	6	4
Q	(Georgia (country)) O Kalashnikova	7	4	6
(Luxembourg) A Kremer	3	6	6
Q	(Russia) E Yashina	6	3	3
(Georgia (country)) S Shapatava	6^{16}	7^{7}	1
(Puerto Rico) M Puig	7^{18}	6^{4}	6
(Serbia) A Krunić	4	3
6	(France) K Mladenovic	6	6

Second round
(Ukraine) E Svitolina	6	6
(Ukraine) O Savchuk	3	1
(Switzerland) A Sadiković	6	6
8	(Romania) M Gojnea	3	3
Q	(Georgia (country)) O Kalashnikova	2	3
(Luxembourg) A Kremer	6	6
(Puerto Rico) M Puig	4	2
6	(France) K Mladenovic	6	6

Quarterfinals
(Ukraine) E Svitolina	4	6	7^{11}
(Switzerland) A Sadiković	6	1	6^{9}
(Luxembourg) A Kremer	3	2
6	(France) K Mladenovic	6	6

Semifinals
(Ukraine) E Svitolina	2	3
6	(France) K Mladenovic	6	6

=== Bottom half ===
First round
7	(Romania) M Buzărnescu	6	6
WC	(Turkey) B Eraydın	2	3
(Ukraine) Y Beygelzimer	7	6
WC	(Turkey) İ Soylu	5	0
(France) V Larrière	7^{8}	6^{3}	2
(Ukraine) I Buryachok	6^{6}	7^{7}	6
LL	(Georgia (country)) E Gorgodze	1	2
3	(Russia) V Savinykh	6	6
5	(France) C Garcia	6	6
(Romania) E Bogdan	2	4
Q	(Romania) L-I Andrei	7	6
WC	(Turkey) N Karagöz	5	2
(Netherlands) K Bertens	6	7
LL	(Belarus) P Pekhova	0	5
SR	(Hungary) K Marosi	6	2	6
2	(Romania) A Cadanțu	2	6	4

Second round
7	(Romania) M Buzărnescu	7^{7}	6
(Ukraine) Y Beygelzimer	6^{4}	2
(Ukraine) I Buryachok	2	4
3	(Russia) V Savinykh	6	6
5	(France) C Garcia	6	6
Q	(Romania) L-I Andrei	1	2
(Netherlands) K Bertens	2	6	7^{7}
SR	(Hungary) K Marosi	6	2	6^{0}

Quarterfinals
7	(Romania) M Buzărnescu	4	2
3	(Russia) V Savinykh	6	6
5	(France) C Garcia	4	3
(Netherlands) K Bertens	6	6

Semifinals
3	(Russia) V Savinykh	6^{3}	6	6
(Netherlands) K Bertens	7^{7}	1	2
