= 2012 Ankara Cup – Singles =

Singles
- 2012 Ankara Cup

Final
- Champion: (Croatia) Ana Savić
- Runner-up: (Puerto Rico) Monica Puig
- Score: 5–7, 6–3, 6–4

Events
Singles	Doubles
← 2011 ·	Ankara Cup	· 2013 →

Kristina Mladenovic was the defending champion, but decided not to participate.

Qualifier Ana Savić won the title, defeating second seed Monica Puig in the final, 5–7, 6–3, 6–4.

== Seeds ==
1. (Luxembourg) Mandy Minella (quarterfinals)
2. (Puerto Rico) Monica Puig (final)
3. (Germany) Dinah Pfizenmaier (second round)
4. (Russia) ~~Valeria Savinykh~~ (withdrew)
5. (Russia) Marta Sirotkina (semifinals)
6. (United States) Chiara Scholl (first round)
7. (Serbia) Aleksandra Krunić (semifinals)
8. (Turkey) Çağla Büyükakçay (second round)

== Main draw ==
=== Key ===
- Q = Qualifier
- WC = Wild card
- LL = Lucky loser
- Alt = Alternate
- SE = Special exempt
- PR = Protected ranking
- ITF = ITF entry
- JE = Junior exempt
- w/o = Walkover
- r = Retired
- d = Defaulted
- SR = Special ranking

=== Finals ===
Semifinals
5	(Russia) Marta Sirotkina	7^{7}	6^{2}	6^{3}
Q	(Croatia) Ana Savić	6^{1}	7^{7}	7^{7}
7	(Serbia) Aleksandra Krunić	6^{4}	1
2	(Puerto Rico) Monica Puig	7^{7}	6

Final
Q	(Croatia) Ana Savić	5	6	6
2	(Puerto Rico) Monica Puig	7	3	4

=== Top half ===
First round
1	(Luxembourg) M Minella	6^{4}	6	6
(Croatia) T Mrdeža	7^{7}	4	2
(Romania) C Mitu	7	4	6
(Belgium) A Van Uytvanck	5	6	3
Q	(Uzbekistan) N Abduraimova	7^{7}	7
(Ukraine) O Savchuk	6^{5}	5
(Ukraine) Y Beygelzimer	2	3
5	(Russia) M Sirotkina	6	6
LL	(Montenegro) D Kovinić	6	3	6
(Germany) K Wörle	2	6	1
WC	(Turkey) S Gönen	1	5
WC	(Turkey) İ Soylu	6	7
Q	(Croatia) A Savić	6	6
WC	(Turkey) B Eraydın	2	3
WC	(Turkey) P Özgen	3	2
8	(Turkey) Ç Büyükakçay	6	6

Second round
1	(Luxembourg) M Minella	6	5	6
(Romania) C Mitu	4	7	4
Q	(Uzbekistan) N Abduraimova	4	2
5	(Russia) M Sirotkina	6	6
LL	(Montenegro) D Kovinić	7^{7}	6
WC	(Turkey) İ Soylu	6^{2}	2
Q	(Croatia) A Savić	6	7
8	(Turkey) Ç Büyükakçay	4	5

Quarterfinals
1	(Luxembourg) M Minella	6^{5}	1
5	(Russia) M Sirotkina	7^{7}	6
LL	(Montenegro) D Kovinić	2	0^{r}
Q	(Croatia) A Savić	6	2

Semifinals
5	(Russia) M Sirotkina	7^{7}	6^{2}	6^{3}
Q	(Croatia) A Savić	6^{1}	7^{7}	7^{7}

=== Bottom half ===
First round
7	(Serbia) A Krunić	6	7^{7}
(Romania) M Gojnea	3	6^{1}
(Romania) A Dulgheru	7^{7}	4	6
(Switzerland) A Sadiković	6^{5}	6	0
(Russia) V Solovyeva	6^{3}	7	2
(Russia) M Gasparyan	7^{7}	5	6
LL	(Tunisia) O Jabeur	1	2
3	(Germany) D Pfizenmaier	6	6
6	(United States) C Scholl	4	0
PR	(Georgia (country)) O Kalashnikova	6	6
(Romania) C Dinu	6	2	3
(Uzbekistan) A Amanmuradova	4	6	6
Q	(Russia) Y Kalabina	6	4	6
Q	(Germany) K Barrois	2	6	4
(Bosnia and Herzegovina) M Jugić-Salkić	6	6^{4}	1
2	(Puerto Rico) M Puig	3	7^{7}	6

Second round
7	(Serbia) A Krunić	7	6
(Romania) A Dulgheru	5	1
(Russia) M Gasparyan	7^{7}	6
3	(Germany) D Pfizenmaier	6^{0}	3
PR	(Georgia (country)) O Kalashnikova	6	4	3
(Uzbekistan) A Amanmuradova	2	6	6
Q	(Russia) Y Kalabina	3	2
2	(Puerto Rico) M Puig	6	6

Quarterfinals
7	(Serbia) A Krunić	6	6
(Russia) M Gasparyan	1	2
(Uzbekistan) A Amanmuradova	0	2
2	(Puerto Rico) M Puig	6	6

Semifinals
7	(Serbia) A Krunić	6^{4}	1
2	(Puerto Rico) M Puig	7^{7}	6
