= Borislava Botusharova =

Bulgarian tennis player (born 1994)

- Native name: Борислава Ботушарова
- Country (sports): Bulgaria
- Residence: Pazardzhik, Bulgaria
- Born: 28 November 1994 (age 30); Pazardzhik
- Turned pro: 2009
- Plays: Right-handed (two-handed backhand)
- Prize money: $14,100

Singles
- Career record: 62–41
- Career titles: 1 ITF
- Highest ranking: No. 407 (28 October 2013)

Doubles
- Career record: 28–29
- Career titles: 0
- Highest ranking: No. 702 (9 September 2013)

Borislava Botusharova (Bulgarian: Борислава Ботушарова; born 26 November 1994) is a former professional tennis player from Bulgaria.

She has been an Old Dominion University tennis player. Botusharova was named the No. 6 ranked Newcomer/Freshman in the entire NCAA entering her first semester of college at ODU (Fall 2014). On 28 October 2013, she reached her highest WTA singles ranking of world No. 407 whilst her best doubles ranking was 702, on 9 September 2013. She has also played once for the Bulgarian Fed Cup team in 2014, when she lost her singles match.

== Professional career ==
=== ITF Circuit and college tennis ===
Botusharova made her debut in 2005 and started playing on the ITF Junior Circuit. She won several junior titles and played her first match on the pro circuit in 2009 and won her first and only title on the ITF Women's Circuit in 2013 in Varna, Bulgaria. In 2014, she was called up in the Bulgaria Fed Cup team. In the same year, Botushrova began studying Tourism Management at the Old Dominion University in Norfolk, Virginia, United States. She started playing college tennis and received the Conference U.S. Player of the Week award.

She played her last match at a $10k event in Adana, Turkey, in June 2014.

== Personal life ==
Botusharova was born in Pazardzhik, Bulgaria. She started playing tennis when she was five years old and her coach was mother Silvia. Botusharova's cousin is fellow Bulgarian tennis player Vivian Zlatanova.

== ITF Circuit finals ==
=== Singles: 3 (1 title, 2 runner–ups) ===
Legend $25,000 tournaments $10,000 tournaments	Finals by surface Clay (1–1) Carpet (0–1)

Result	W–L	Date	Tournament	Tier	Surface	Opponent	Score
Loss	0–1	Nov 2012	ITF Heraklion, Greece	10,000	Carpet	(France) Manon Arcangioli	1–6, 2–6
Win	1–1	Sep 2013	ITF Varna, Bulgaria	10,000	Clay	(Czech Republic) Pernilla Mendesová	6–4, 1–6, 7–6^{(2)}
Loss	1–2	Oct 2013	ITF Albena, Bulgaria	10,000	Clay	(Bulgaria) Vivian Zlatanova	3–6, 6–3, 6–7^{(5)}

=== Doubles: 3 (3 runner–ups) ===
Legend $25,000 tournaments $10,000 tournaments	Finals by surface Clay (0–2) Carpet (0–1)

Result	W–L	Date	Tournament	Tier	Surface	Partner	Opponents	Score
Loss	0–1	Sep 2012	ITF Varna, Bulgaria	10,000	Clay	(Bulgaria) Viktoriya Tomova	(Belgium) Michaela Boev (Ukraine) Anastasiya Vasylyeva	1–6, 5–7
Loss	0–2	Nov 2012	ITF Heraklion, Greece	10,000	Carpet	(Bulgaria) Vivian Zlatanova	(Turkey) Başak Eraydın (Australia) Abbie Myers	0–6, 1–6
Loss	0–3	Aug 2013	ITF Pirot, Serbia	10,000	Clay	(Bulgaria) Ani Vangelova	(Serbia) Katarina Adamović (Montenegro) Vladica Babić	0–6, 3–6

== Fed Cup ==
=== Singles (0–1) ===
Edition	Round	Date	Against	Surface	Opponent	W/L	Result
2014 Europe/Africa Group I	RR	7 February 2014	Belarus	Hard (i)	(Belarus) Aliaksandra Sasnovich	L	1–6, 3–6
