= 2012 Internationaux Féminins de la Vienne =

- Date: 22–28 October 2012
- Edition: 16th
- Location: Poitiers, France

Champions

Singles
- (Puerto Rico) Monica Puig

Doubles
- (Colombia) Catalina Castaño / (Bosnia and Herzegovina) Mervana Jugić-Salkić
- Internationaux Féminins de la Vienne

The 2012 Internationaux Féminins de la Vienne was a professional tennis tournament played on indoor hard courts. It was the sixteenth edition of the tournament which was part of the 2012 ITF Women's Circuit. It took place in Poitiers, France on 22–28 October 2012.

== WTA entrants ==
=== Seeds ===
Country	Player	Rank^{1}	Seed
FRA	Alizé Cornet	43	1
RUS	Elena Vesnina	65	2
ROU	Monica Niculescu	70	3
SVK	Magdaléna Rybáriková	71	4
SWE	Johanna Larsson	74	5
ROU	Alexandra Cadanțu	85	6
RUS	Alexandra Panova	88	7
FRA	Kristina Mladenovic	95	8

- ^{1} Rankings are as of 15 October 2012.

=== Other entrants ===
The following players received wildcards into the singles main draw:

- (France) Julie Coin
- (France) Alizé Cornet
- (France) Myrtille Georges
- (France) Aravane Rezaï

The following players received entry from the qualifying draw:

- (Colombia) Catalina Castaño
- (Romania) Mădălina Gojnea
- (Bulgaria) Elitsa Kostova
- (Slovakia) Anna Karolína Schmiedlová

== Champions ==
=== Singles ===
- (Puerto Rico) Monica Puig def. (Russia) Elena Vesnina, 7–5, 1–6, 7–5

=== Doubles ===
- (Colombia) Catalina Castaño / (Bosnia and Herzegovina) Mervana Jugić-Salkić def. (France) Stéphanie Foretz Gacon / (Germany) Tatjana Malek, 6–4, 5–7, [10–4]
