= 2012 Internationaux Féminins de la Vienne – Doubles =

Doubles
- 2012 Internationaux Féminins de la Vienne

Final
- Champions: (Colombia) Catalina Castaño (Bosnia and Herzegovina) Mervana Jugić-Salkić
- Runners-up: (France) Stéphanie Foretz Gacon (Germany) Tatjana Malek
- Score: 6–4, 5–7, [10–4]

Events
| Singles | Doubles |
- Internationaux Féminins de la Vienne

Alizé Cornet and Virginie Razzano were the defending champions, but Cornet chose not to participate. Razzano partnered up with Alexandra Cadanțu, but they lost to Maria Kondratieva and Olga Savchuk in the first round.

Catalina Castaño and Mervana Jugić-Salkić won the title defeating Stéphanie Foretz Gacon and Tatjana Malek in the final 6–4, 5–7, [10–4].

== Seeds ==
1. (France) Stéphanie Foretz Gacon / (Germany) Tatjana Malek (final)
2. (Colombia) Catalina Castaño / (Bosnia and Herzegovina) Mervana Jugić-Salkić (champions)
3. (Serbia) Vesna Dolonc / (United States) Megan Moulton-Levy (first round)
4. (France) Séverine Beltrame / (France) Julie Coin (first round)

== Draw ==
Key

- Q = Qualifier
- WC = Wild card
- LL = Lucky loser
- Alt = Alternate
- ITF = ITF entry
- PR = Protected ranking
- SR = Special ranking
- SE = Special exempt
- JE = Junior exempt
- JR = Junior Accelerator Programme entrant
- CO = College Accelerator Programme entrant
- NG = Next Gen Accelerator Program entrant
- w/o = Walkover
- r = Retired
- d = Defaulted

=== Draw ===
First round
(France) F Caramaro (France) V Muntean | 2 | 1
(Portugal) MJ Koehler (Russia) V Savinykh | 6 | 6
3 | (Serbia) V Dolonc (United States) M Moulton-Levy | 3 | 6 | [7]
(Belarus) E Dzehalevich (Georgia (country)) O Kalashnikova | 6 | 3 | [10]
(Romania) A Cadanțu (France) V Razzano | 6 | 4 | [6]
(Russia) M Kondratieva (Ukraine) O Savchuk | 2 | 6 | [10]
(France) C Feuerstein (France) S Lefèvre | 2 | 3
(United States) M Burdette (Argentina) P Ormaechea | 6 | 6
(France) I Pavlovic (Switzerland) S Vögele | 3 | 6 | [11]
4 | (France) S Beltrame (France) J Coin | 6 | 2 | [9]
(Kazakhstan) Y Putintseva (Slovenia) P Rampre | 2 | 3
(Romania) M Gojnea (Poland) M Linette | 6 | 6
(Italy) N Burnett (Belarus) S Pirazhenka | 4 | 2
2 | (Colombia) C Castaño (Bosnia and Herzegovina) M Jugić-Salkić | 6 | 6

Quarterfinals
1 | (France) S Foretz Gacon (Germany) T Malek | 7 | 6
(Portugal) MJ Koehler (Russia) V Savinykh | 5 | 0
(Belarus) E Dzehalevich (Georgia (country)) O Kalashnikova | 7 | 7^{7}
(Russia) M Kondratieva (Ukraine) O Savchuk | 5 | 6^{3}
(United States) M Burdette (Argentina) P Ormaechea | 7^{7} | 2 | [10]
(France) I Pavlovic (Switzerland) S Vögele | 6^{4} | 6 | [12]
(Romania) M Gojnea (Poland) M Linette | 0 | 5
2 | (Colombia) C Castaño (Bosnia and Herzegovina) M Jugić-Salkić | 6 | 7

Semifinals
1 | (France) S Foretz Gacon (Germany) T Malek | 6 | 6
(Belarus) E Dzehalevich (Georgia (country)) O Kalashnikova | 1 | 4
(France) I Pavlovic (Switzerland) S Vögele | 6 | 6^{1} | [5]
2 | (Colombia) C Castaño (Bosnia and Herzegovina) M Jugić-Salkić | 2 | 7^{7} | [10]

Finals
1 | (France) S Foretz Gacon (Germany) T Malek | 4 | 7 | [4]
2 | (Colombia) C Castaño (Bosnia and Herzegovina) M Jugić-Salkić | 6 | 5 | [10]
