= 2012 Ankara Cup – Doubles =

Doubles
- 2012 Ankara Cup

Final
- Champions: (Poland) Magda Linette (Poland) Katarzyna Piter
- Runners-up: (Ukraine) Irina Buryachok (Russia) Valeria Solovyeva
- Score: 6–2, 6–2

Events
Singles	Doubles
← 2011 ·	Ankara Cup	· 2013 →

Nina Bratchikova and Darija Jurak were the defending champions, but both players chose not to participate.

Magda Linette and Katarzyna Piter won the title, defeating Irina Buryachok and Valeria Solovyeva in the final, 6–2, 6–2.

== Seeds ==
1. (Bosnia and Herzegovina) Mervana Jugić-Salkić / (Georgia (country)) Oksana Kalashnikova (semifinals)
2. (Ukraine) Irina Buryachok / (Russia) Valeria Solovyeva (final)
3. (Ukraine) ~~Olga Savchuk~~ / (Russia) ~~Valeria Savinykh~~ (withdrew)
4. (Austria) Sandra Klemenschits / (Germany) Kathrin Wörle (first round)

== Draw ==
=== Key ===
- Q = Qualifier
- WC = Wild card
- LL = Lucky loser
- Alt = Alternate
- SE = Special exempt
- PR = Protected ranking
- ITF = ITF entry
- JE = Junior exempt
- w/o = Walkover
- r = Retired
- d = Defaulted
- SR = Special ranking

First round
1	(Bosnia and Herzegovina) M Jugić-Salkić (Georgia (country)) O Kalashnikova	6	6
(Romania) A Dulgheru (Luxembourg) M Minella	4	2
(Belarus) I Kremen (Belarus) L Marozava	6	7^{7}
(Georgia (country)) E Gorgodze (Russia) E Pashkova	2	6^{4}
4	(Austria) S Klemenschits (Germany) K Wörle	4	0
(Poland) M Linette (Poland) K Piter	6	6
WC	(Turkey) B Eraydın (Turkey) İ Soylu	6	6
WC	(Turkey) Ç Büyükakçay (Turkey) P Özgen	2	2
(Romania) C Dinu (Romania) M Gojnea	2	6	[11]
(Russia) M Gasparyan (Russia) M Sirotkina	6	4	[9]
(Romania) L-I Andrei (Ukraine) Y Beygelzimer	4	4
Alt	(Serbia) A Krunić (Croatia) T Mrdeža	6	6
(Uzbekistan) N Abduraimova (Kyrgyzstan) K Palkina	6	6^{4}	[6]
WC	(Turkey) S Alptekin (Turkey) S Gönen	2	7^{7}	[10]
(United States) C Scholl (Russia) E Yashina	4	1
2	(Ukraine) I Buryachok (Russia) V Solovyeva	6	6

Quarterfinals
1	(Bosnia and Herzegovina) M Jugić-Salkić (Georgia (country)) O Kalashnikova	3	6	[10]
(Belarus) I Kremen (Belarus) L Marozava	6	4	[8]
(Poland) M Linette (Poland) K Piter	7^{7}	4	[10]
WC	(Turkey) B Eraydın (Turkey) İ Soylu	6^{4}	6	[5]
(Romania) C Dinu (Romania) M Gojnea	6	6^{4}	[10]
Alt	(Serbia) A Krunić (Croatia) T Mrdeža	4	7^{7}	[4]
WC	(Turkey) S Alptekin (Turkey) S Gönen	1	3
2	(Ukraine) I Buryachok (Russia) V Solovyeva	6	6

Semifinals
1	(Bosnia and Herzegovina) M Jugić-Salkić (Georgia (country)) O Kalashnikova	6^{6}	3
(Poland) M Linette (Poland) K Piter	7^{8}	6
(Romania) C Dinu (Romania) M Gojnea	6	3	[6]
2	(Ukraine) I Buryachok (Russia) V Solovyeva	4	6	[10]

Final
(Poland) M Linette (Poland) K Piter	6	6
2	(Ukraine) I Buryachok (Russia) V Solovyeva	2	2
