= 2012 Internationaux Féminins de la Vienne – Singles =

Singles
- 2012 Internationaux Féminins de la Vienne

Final
- Champion: (Puerto Rico) Monica Puig
- Runner-up: (Russia) Elena Vesnina
- Score: 7–5, 1–6, 7–5

Events
Singles	Doubles
- Internationaux Féminins de la Vienne

Kimiko Date-Krumm was the defending champion, but lost to Elena Vesnina in the first round.

Monica Puig won the title defeating Elena Vesnina in the final 7–5, 1–6, 7–5.

== Seeds ==
1. (France) Alizé Cornet (first round)
2. (Russia) Elena Vesnina (final)
3. (Romania) Monica Niculescu (semifinals)
4. (Slovakia) Magdaléna Rybáriková (semifinals)
5. (Sweden) Johanna Larsson (second round)
6. (Romania) Alexandra Cadanțu (first round)
7. (Russia) Alexandra Panova (first round)
8. (France) Kristina Mladenovic (first round)

== Main draw ==
Key

- Q = Qualifier
- WC = Wild card
- LL = Lucky loser
- Alt = Alternate
- ITF = ITF entry
- PR = Protected ranking
- SR = Special ranking
- SE = Special exempt
- JE = Junior exempt
- JR = Junior Accelerator Programme entrant
- CO = College Accelerator Programme entrant
- NG = Next Gen Accelerator Program entrant
- w/o = Walkover
- r = Retired
- d = Defaulted

=== Finals ===
Semifinals
(Puerto Rico) Monica Puig	6	6
4	(Slovakia) Magdaléna Rybáriková	3	3
3	(Romania) Monica Niculescu	7	4	2
2	(Russia) Elena Vesnina	5	6	6

Final
(Puerto Rico) Monica Puig	7	1	7
2	(Russia) Elena Vesnina	5	6	5

=== Top half ===
First round
1/WC	(France) A Cornet	6^{3}	6	0
(Switzerland) S Vögele	7^{7}	3	6
Q	(Romania) M Gojnea	4	6	6
(Portugal) MJ Koehler	6	3	2
(France) V Razzano	6	3	4
(Puerto Rico) M Puig	3	6	6
(Argentina) P Ormaechea	3	1
5	(Sweden) J Larsson	6	6
4	(Slovakia) M Rybáriková	6	1	6
Q	(Slovakia) AK Schmiedlová	4	6	3
Q	(Colombia) C Castaño	6	3	6
(Germany) T Malek	2	6	3
(France) S Foretz Gacon	7	6
(China) S Zhang	5	2
WC	(France) A Rezaï	7^{7}	2	6
7	(Russia) A Panova	6^{2}	6	4

Second round
(Switzerland) S Vögele	6	6
Q	(Romania) M Gojnea	2	0
(Puerto Rico) M Puig	6	6
5	(Sweden) J Larsson	3	2
4	(Slovakia) M Rybáriková	6	6
Q	(Colombia) C Castaño	2	2
(France) S Foretz Gacon	6	6
WC	(France) A Rezaï	3	4

Quarterfinals
(Switzerland) S Vögele	2	4
(Puerto Rico) M Puig	6	6
4	(Slovakia) M Rybáriková	6	6
(France) S Foretz Gacon	3	1

Semifinals
(Puerto Rico) M Puig	6	6
4	(Slovakia) M Rybáriková	3	3

=== Bottom half ===
First round
6	(Romania) A Cadanțu	3	4
(Kazakhstan) Y Putintseva	6	6
(France) I Pavlovic	6	4	7^{10}
(Spain) G Muguruza	1	6	6^{8}
(United States) M Burdette	6	6
(Russia) V Savinykh	3	2
Q	(Bulgaria) E Kostova	2	4
3	(Romania) M Niculescu	6	6
8	(France) K Mladenovic	4	6	4
(Italy) N Burnett	6	4	6
(France) C Feuerstein	3	2
(United Kingdom) J Konta	6	6
WC	(France) J Coin	6	6
WC	(France) M Georges	3	3
(Japan) K Date-Krumm	6	6^{4}	3
2	(Russia) E Vesnina	3	7^{7}	6

Second round
(Kazakhstan) Y Putintseva	4	6	6
(France) I Pavlovic	6	2	2
(United States) M Burdette	5	6^{1}
3	(Romania) M Niculescu	7	7^{7}
(Italy) N Burnett	6	2	6
(United Kingdom) J Konta	3	6	4
WC	(France) J Coin	4	2
2	(Russia) E Vesnina	6	6

Quarterfinals
(Kazakhstan) Y Putintseva	3	2
3	(Romania) M Niculescu	6	6
(Italy) N Burnett	1	1
2	(Russia) E Vesnina	6	6

Semifinals
3	(Romania) M Niculescu	7	4	2
2	(Russia) E Vesnina	5	6	6
