= Ana Savić =

Croatian tennis player (born 1989)

- Country (sports): Croatia
- Born: 9 October 1989 (age 35); Požega, SFR Yugoslavia
- Prize money: $70,834

Singles
- Career record: 172–84
- Career titles: 9 ITF
- Highest ranking: No. 222 (25 February 2013)

Grand Slam singles results
- US Open: Q1 (2013)

Doubles
- Career record: 19–26
- Career titles: 1 ITF
- Highest ranking: No. 592 (6 October 2014)

Ana Savić (Croatian pronunciation: [âna sǎːʋitɕ, ǎː-]; born 9 October 1989 in Požega) is a Croatian former tennis player.

Savić won nine singles titles and one doubles title on the ITF Women's Circuit. On 25 February 2013, she reached her best singles ranking of world No. 222. On 6 October 2014, she peaked at No. 592 in the doubles rankings.

She won her first $50k tournament at the 2012 Ankara Cup.

== ITF finals ==
=== Singles (9–4) ===
Legend $50,000 tournaments $25,000 tournaments $10,000 tournaments	Finals by surface Hard (1–2) Clay (8–2) Carpet (0–0)

Result	No.	Date	Tournament	Surface	Opponent	Score
Winner	1.	29 October 2006	Dubrovnik, Croatia	Clay	(Slovenia) Polona Reberšak	1–6, 6–3, 6–4
Runner-up	1.	14 December 2008	Přerov, Czech Republic	Hard (i)	(Czech Republic) Tereza Hladíková	4–6, 5–7
Winner	2.	4 March 2012	Antalya, Turkey	Clay	(Italy) Gioia Barbieri	6–3, 6–4
Winner	3.	10 March 2012	Antalya	Clay	(Italy) Martina Di Giuseppe	6–2, 4–6, 6–2
Winner	4.	18 March 2012	Antalya	Clay	(Bosnia and Herzegovina) Jasmina Tinjić	6–0, 6–4
Winner	5.	25 March 2012	Antalya	Clay	(Switzerland) Lisa Sabino	5–0 ret.
Winner	6.	1 July 2012	Prokuplje, Serbia	Clay	(Slovakia) Chantal Škamlová	6–2, 6–4
Runner-up	2.	5 August 2012	Empire Slovak Open, Slovakia	Clay	(Latvia) Anastasija Sevastova	w/o
Winner	7.	7 October 2012	Solin, Croatia	Clay	(Croatia) Bernarda Pera	5–7, 6–2, 7–5
Winner	8.	22 December 2012	Ankara Cup, Turkey	Hard (i)	(Puerto Rico) Monica Puig	5–7, 6–3, 6–4
Winner	9.	8 November 2014	Casablanca, Morocco	Clay	(Russia) Valentina Kulikova	6–0, 6–3
Runner-up	3.	19 June 2016	Sharm El Sheikh, Egypt	Hard	(Romania) Jaqueline Cristian	5–7, 4–6
Runner-up	4.	11 September 2016	Hammamet, Tunisia	Clay	(Sweden) Fanny Östlund	4–6, 2–6

=== Doubles (1–1) ===
Legend $25,000 tournaments $10,000 tournaments	Finals by surface Hard (0–0) Clay (1–1)

Result	No.	Date	Tournament	Surface	Partner	Opponents	Score
Winner	1.	6 April 2007	Cavtat, Croatia	Clay	(Russia) Anastasia Poltoratskaya	(Serbia) Ana Jovanović (Serbia) Nataša Zorić	6–1, 6–1
Runner-up	1.	6 August 2016	Vinkovci, Croatia	Clay	(Croatia) Tea Faber	(Hungary) Bianka Békefi (Hungary) Szabina Szlavikovics	4–6, 4–6
