= Ankara Cup =

Defunct tennis tournament
- Event name: Ankara
- Location: Ankara, Turkey
- Venue: Ankara Tennis Club
- Category: ITF Women's Circuit
- Surface: Hard (indoor)
- Draw: 32S/32Q/16D
- Prize money: $50,000
- Website: Official website

The Ankara Cup was a tournament for professional female tennis players, played on indoor hardcourts. The event was classified as a $50,000 ITF Women's Circuit tournament and was held annually in Ankara, Turkey, from 2011 to 2016.

== Past finals ==
=== Singles ===
Year	Champion	Runner-up	Score
2016	(Serbia) Ivana Jorović	(Russia) Vitalia Diatchenko	6–4, 7–5
2015	(Serbia) Ivana Jorović	(Turkey) Çağla Büyükakçay	7–6^{(7–3)}, 3–6, 6–2
2014	(Serbia) Aleksandra Krunić	(Uzbekistan) Akgul Amanmuradova	3–6, 6–2, 7–6^{(8–6)}
2013	(Russia) Vitalia Diatchenko	(Russia) Marta Sirotkina	6–7^{(3–7)}, 6–4, 6–4
2012	(Croatia) Ana Savić	(Puerto Rico) Monica Puig	5–7, 6–3, 6–4
2011	(France) Kristina Mladenovic	(Russia) Valeria Savinykh	7–5, 5–7, 6–1

=== Doubles ===
Year	Champions	Runners-up	Score
2016	(Russia) Anna Blinkova (Belarus) Lidziya Marozava	(Uzbekistan) Sabina Sharipova (Russia) Ekaterina Yashina	4–6, 6–3, [11–9]
2015	(Spain) María José Martínez Sánchez (Russia) Marina Melnikova	(Poland) Paula Kania (Netherlands) Lesley Kerkhove	6–4, 5–7, [10–8]
2014	(Georgia (country)) Ekaterine Gorgodze (Slovenia) Nastja Kolar	(Ukraine) Oleksandra Korashvili (Bulgaria) Elitsa Kostova	6–4, 7–6^{(7–5)}
2013	(Ukraine) Yuliya Beygelzimer (Turkey) Çağla Büyükakçay	(Greece) Eleni Daniilidou (Serbia) Aleksandra Krunić	6–3, 6–3
2012	(Poland) Magda Linette (Poland) Katarzyna Piter	(Ukraine) Irina Buryachok (Russia) Valeria Solovyeva	6–2, 6–2
2011	(Russia) Nina Bratchikova (Croatia) Darija Jurak	(Slovakia) Janette Husárová (Hungary) Katalin Marosi	6–4, 6–2
