= 2013 Soho Square Ladies Tournament – Doubles =

Doubles
- 2013 Soho Square Ladies Tournament

Final
- Champions: (Switzerland) Timea Bacsinszky (Germany) Kristina Barrois
- Runners-up: (Russia) Anna Morgina (Czech Republic) Kateřina Siniaková
- Score: 6–7^{(5–7)}, 6–0, [10–4]

Events
Singles	Doubles
Soho Square Ladies Tournament	· 2016 →

This was a new event on the 2013 ITF Women's Circuit.

Timea Bacsinszky and Kristina Barrois won the tournament, defeating Anna Morgina and Kateřina Siniaková in the final, 6–7^{(5–7)}, 6–0, [10–4].

== Seeds ==
1. (Russia) Alla Kudryavtseva / (Romania) Raluca Olaru (quarterfinals)
2. (Brazil) Paula Cristina Gonçalves / (Chile) Daniela Seguel (first round)
3. (Czech Republic) Nikola Fraňková / (Czech Republic) Tereza Smitková (first round)
4. (Ukraine) Alona Fomina / (Germany) Christina Shakovets (first round)

== Draw ==
=== Key ===
- Q = Qualifier
- WC = Wild card
- LL = Lucky loser
- Alt = Alternate
- SE = Special exempt
- PR = Protected ranking
- ITF = ITF entry
- JE = Junior exempt
- w/o = Walkover
- r = Retired
- d = Defaulted
- SR = Special ranking

First round
1	(Russia) A Kudryavtseva (Romania) R Olaru	6	6
Alt	(Russia) Y Kalabina (Russia) E Svintsova	3	3
(Switzerland) T Bacsinszky (Germany) K Barrois	7	6
(Oman) F Al-Nabhani (Hungary) Á Bukta	5	1
3	(Czech Republic) N Fraňková (Czech Republic) T Smitková	6^{4}	1
(Italy) A Brianti (Hungary) R-L Jani	7^{7}	6
WC	(Serbia) J Jakšić (Russia) V Kan	6	7
WC	(Spain) E Cabeza Candela (Spain) A Fernández Rabener	2	5
(Slovakia) K Kučová (Germany) A Schäfer	4	4
(Russia) A Morgina (Czech Republic) K Siniaková	6	6
(Slovenia) N Kolar (Russia) E Yashina	6	6
4	(Ukraine) A Fomina (Germany) C Shakovets	2	4
(Russia) M Shamayko (Slovenia) M Zec Peškirič	6	3	[4]
(Russia) V Diatchenko (Russia) E Rodina	2	6	[10]
WC	(Austria) P Mayr-Achleitner (Russia) A Panova	4	6	[10]
2	(Brazil) PC Gonçalves (Chile) D Seguel	6	4	[4]

Quarterfinals
1	(Russia) A Kudryavtseva (Romania) R Olaru	4	3
(Switzerland) T Bacsinszky (Germany) K Barrois	6	6
(Italy) A Brianti (Hungary) R-L Jani	1	2
WC	(Serbia) J Jakšić (Russia) V Kan	6	6
(Russia) A Morgina (Czech Republic) K Siniaková	6	6
(Slovenia) N Kolar (Russia) E Yashina	4	3
(Russia) V Diatchenko (Russia) E Rodina	6	6
WC	(Austria) P Mayr-Achleitner (Russia) A Panova	4	2

Semifinals
(Switzerland) T Bacsinszky (Germany) K Barrois	6	6
WC	(Serbia) J Jakšić (Russia) V Kan	3	2
(Russia) A Morgina (Czech Republic) K Siniaková	3	6	[10]
(Russia) V Diatchenko (Russia) E Rodina	6	2	[8]

Final
(Switzerland) T Bacsinszky (Germany) K Barrois	6^{5}	6	[10]
(Russia) A Morgina (Czech Republic) K Siniaková	7^{7}	0	[4]
