= 2013 Soho Square Ladies Tournament =

- Date: 18–24 November
- Edition: 1st
- Category: ITF Women's Circuit
- Prize money: $75,000+H
- Surface: Clay
- Location: Sharm el-Sheikh, Egypt

Champions

Singles
- (Russia) Victoria Kan

Doubles
- (Switzerland) Timea Bacsinszky / (Germany) Kristina Barrois
Soho Square Ladies Tournament	· 2016 →

The 2013 Soho Square Ladies Tournament was a professional tennis tournament played on outdoor clay courts. It was the first edition of the tournament which was part of the 2013 ITF Women's Circuit, offering a total of $75,000+H in prize money. It took place in Sharm el-Sheikh, Egypt, on 18–24 November 2013.

== Singles entrants ==
=== Seeds ===
Country	Player	Rank^{1}	Seed
EST	Kaia Kanepi	30	1
AUT	Patricia Mayr-Achleitner	99	2
KAZ	Yulia Putintseva	106	3
ESP	Estrella Cabeza Candela	113	4
SLO	~~Tadeja Majerič~~	~~116~~	~~5~~
RUS	Alexandra Panova	138	6
RUS	Nina Bratchikova	149	7
SVK	Kristína Kučová	152	8

- ^{1} Rankings as of 11 November 2013

=== Other entrants ===
The following players received wildcards into the singles main draw:

- (Oman) Fatma Al-Nabhani
- (Russia) Yuliya Kalabina
- (France) Pauline Payet
- (Russia) Marina Shamayko

The following players received entry from the qualifying draw:

- (Slovenia) Nastja Kolar
- (Slovakia) Karin Morgošová
- (Romania) Raluca Olaru
- (Chile) Daniela Seguel

The following player received entry into the singles main draw as a lucky loser:

- (Slovenia) Maša Zec Peškirič

The following player received entry by a protected ranking:

- (Russia) Evgeniya Rodina

The following player received entry by a junior exempt:

- (Czech Republic) Kateřina Siniaková

== Champions ==
=== Singles ===
- (Russia) Victoria Kan def. (Slovenia) Nastja Kolar 6–4, 6–4

=== Doubles ===
- (Switzerland) Timea Bacsinszky / (Germany) Kristina Barrois def. (Russia) Anna Morgina / (Czech Republic) Kateřina Siniaková 6–7^{(5–7)}, 6–0, [10–4]
