= 2016 Soho Square Ladies Tournament – Doubles =

Doubles
- 2016 Soho Square Ladies Tournament

Final
- Champions: (Romania) Irina Maria Bara (Ukraine) Alona Fomina
- Runners-up: (Argentina) Guadalupe Pérez Rojas (Switzerland) Jil Teichmann
- Score: 6–2, 6–1

Events
Singles	Doubles
← 2013 ·	Soho Square Ladies Tournament	· 2017 →

Timea Bacsinszky and Kristina Barrois were the defending champions having won the last edition in 2013, but chose not to participate.

Irina Maria Bara and Alona Fomina won the title, defeating Guadalupe Pérez Rojas and Jil Teichmann in the final, 6–2, 6–1.

== Seeds ==
1. (Japan) Nao Hibino / (Switzerland) Amra Sadiković (first round)
2. (Romania) Cristina Dinu / (North Macedonia) Lina Gjorcheska (quarterfinals)
3. (Spain) Georgina García Pérez / (Russia) Anna Morgina (semifinals)
4. (Hungary) Réka Luca Jani / (Russia) Yana Sizikova (semifinals)

== Draw ==
=== Key ===
- Q = Qualifier
- WC = Wild card
- LL = Lucky loser
- Alt = Alternate
- SE = Special exempt
- PR = Protected ranking
- ITF = ITF entry
- JE = Junior exempt
- w/o = Walkover
- r = Retired
- d = Defaulted
- SR = Special ranking

First round
1	(Japan) N Hibino (Switzerland) A Sadiković	0	3
(Romania) IM Bara (Ukraine) A Fomina	6	6
(Greece) M Sakkari (Spain) S Sorribes Tormo	6	6
(Brazil) L Pigossi (Spain) S Soler Espinosa	2	4
3	(Spain) G García Pérez (Russia) A Morgina	7	6
(Egypt) O Abou Zekry (Italy) A Grymalska	5	2
(Netherlands) C Burger (India) A Raina	3	6	[10]
(Russia) V Diatchenko (Romania) AB Mihăilă	6	1	[6]
WC	(Sweden) J Cabaj Awad (Egypt) S Samir	6	1	[5]
(Turkey) B Eraydın (Russia) A Komardina	2	6	[10]
(Romania) J Cristian (Romania) N Dascălu	6^{5}	2
4	(Hungary) RL Jani (Russia) Y Sizikova	7^{7}	6
WC	(Austria) M Klaffner (Germany) J Wachaczyk	0	6	[9]
(Argentina) G Pérez Rojas (Switzerland) J Teichmann	6	4	[11]
WC	(Greece) E Kordolaimi (Russia) A Pribylova	2	4
2	(Romania) C Dinu (North Macedonia) L Gjorcheska	6	6

Quarterfinals
(Romania) IM Bara (Ukraine) A Fomina	6	6
(Greece) M Sakkari (Spain) S Sorribes Tormo	4	1
3	(Spain) G García Pérez (Russia) A Morgina	6	6
(Netherlands) C Burger (India) A Raina	3	2
(Turkey) B Eraydın (Russia) A Komardina
4	(Hungary) RL Jani (Russia) Y Sizikova	w/o
(Argentina) G Pérez Rojas (Switzerland) J Teichmann	6	6
2	(Romania) C Dinu (North Macedonia) L Gjorcheska	2	3

Semifinals
(Romania) IM Bara (Ukraine) A Fomina	4	6	[11]
3	(Spain) G García Pérez (Russia) A Morgina	6	3	[9]
4	(Hungary) RL Jani (Russia) Y Sizikova	3	5
(Argentina) G Pérez Rojas (Switzerland) J Teichmann	6	7

Final
(Romania) IM Bara (Ukraine) A Fomina	6	6
(Argentina) G Pérez Rojas (Switzerland) J Teichmann	2	1
