= 2014 Ankara Cup =

- Date: 15–21 December
- Edition: 4th
- Category: ITF Women's Circuit
- Prize money: $50,000
- Surface: Hard (indoor)
- Location: Ankara, Turkey
- Venue: Ankara Tennis Club

Champions

Singles
- (Serbia) Aleksandra Krunić

Doubles
- (Georgia (country)) Ekaterine Gorgodze / (Slovenia) Nastja Kolar
← 2013 ·	Ankara Cup	· 2015 →

The 2014 Ankara Cup is a professional tennis tournament played on indoor hard courts. It is the fourth edition of the tournament which is part of the 2014 ITF Women's Circuit, offering a total of $50,000 in prize money. It takes place in Ankara, Turkey, on 15–21 December 2014.

== Singles entrants ==
=== Seeds ===
Country	Player	Rank^{1}	Seed
SRB	Aleksandra Krunić	102	1
RUS	Evgeniya Rodina	121	2
TUR	Çağla Büyükakçay	136	3
UKR	Kateryna Kozlova	142	4
SWE	Rebecca Peterson	162	5
FRA	Océane Dodin	179	6
RUS	Marina Melnikova	181	7
UKR	Yuliya Beygelzimer	186	8

- ^{1} Rankings as of 8 December 2014

=== Other entrants ===
The following players received wildcards into the singles main draw:

- (Turkey) Başak Eraydın
- (Turkey) İrem Kaftan
- (Turkey) İnci Öğüt
- (Turkey) İpek Soylu

The following players received entry from the qualifying draw:

- (Croatia) Jana Fett
- (Ukraine) Elizaveta Ianchuk
- (Russia) Valentyna Ivakhnenko
- (Ukraine) Anna Shkudun

The following player received entry by a protected ranking:

- (Uzbekistan) Akgul Amanmuradova

== Champions ==
=== Singles ===
- (Serbia) Aleksandra Krunić def. (Uzbekistan) Akgul Amanmuradova, 3–6, 6–2, 7–6^{(8–6)}

=== Doubles ===
- (Georgia (country)) Ekaterine Gorgodze / (Slovenia) Nastja Kolar def. (Ukraine) Oleksandra Korashvili / (Bulgaria) Elitsa Kostova, 6–4, 7–6^{(7–5)}
