= 2013 Ankara Cup – Doubles =

Doubles
- 2013 Ankara Cup

Final
- Champions: (Ukraine) Yuliya Beygelzimer (Turkey) Çağla Büyükakçay
- Runners-up: (Greece) Eleni Daniilidou (Serbia) Aleksandra Krunić
- Score: 6–3, 6–3

Events
Singles	Doubles
← 2012 ·	Ankara Cup	· 2014 →

Magda Linette and Katarzyna Piter were the defending champions, having won the event in 2012, but Piter chose not to participate in 2013. Linette partnered up with Naomi Broady, but lost to Yuliya Beygelzimer and Çağla Büyükakçay in the semifinals.

Beygelzimer and Büyükakçay won the tournament, defeating Eleni Daniilidou and Aleksandra Krunić in the final, 6–3, 6–3.

== Seeds ==
1. (Greece) Eleni Daniilidou / (Serbia) Aleksandra Krunić (final)
2. (United Kingdom) Naomi Broady / (Poland) Magda Linette (semifinals)
3. (Ukraine) Yuliya Beygelzimer / (Turkey) Çağla Büyükakçay (champions)
4. (Germany) Kristina Barrois / (Russia) Vitalia Diatchenko (quarterfinals)

== Draw ==
=== Key ===
- Q = Qualifier
- WC = Wild card
- LL = Lucky loser
- Alt = Alternate
- SE = Special exempt
- PR = Protected ranking
- ITF = ITF entry
- JE = Junior exempt
- w/o = Walkover
- r = Retired
- d = Defaulted
- SR = Special ranking

First round
1	(Greece) E Daniilidou (Serbia) A Krunić	4	6	[10]
(Georgia (country)) E Gorgodze (Turkey) İ Öğüt	6	0	[5]
(Czech Republic) H Birnerová (Russia) M Gasparyan	6	6
(Turkey) G Güldaş (Turkey) E Tomey	0	0
4	(Germany) K Barrois (Russia) V Diatchenko	6	6
(Russia) Y Kalabina (Russia) P Leykina	2	4
(Bulgaria) I Shinikova (Bosnia and Herzegovina) J Tinjić	3	6	[8]
(Russia) O Doroshina (Russia) A Morgina	6	1	[10]
(Germany) K Grajdek (Poland) J Jegiołka	6	5	[3]
(Turkey) M Sezer (Turkey) İ Soylu	4	7	[10]
(Russia) N Orlova (Russia) E Yashina	7	2	[4]
3	(Ukraine) Y Beygelzimer (Turkey) Ç Büyükakçay	5	6	[10]
(Turkey) B Eraydın (Montenegro) D Kovinić	6	6
(Russia) V Kan (Ukraine) G Poznikhirenko	0	1
(Ukraine) A Fomina (Germany) C Shakovets	6	2	[6]
2	(United Kingdom) N Broady (Poland) M Linette	3	6	[10]

Quarterfinals
1	(Greece) E Daniilidou (Serbia) A Krunić	w/o
(Czech Republic) H Birnerová (Russia) M Gasparyan
4	(Germany) K Barrois (Russia) V Diatchenko	3	6	[10]
(Russia) O Doroshina (Russia) A Morgina	6	2	[12]
(Turkey) M Sezer (Turkey) İ Soylu	4	4
3	(Ukraine) Y Beygelzimer (Turkey) Ç Büyükakçay	6	6
(Turkey) B Eraydın (Montenegro) D Kovinić	5	1
2	(United Kingdom) N Broady (Poland) M Linette	7	6

Semifinals
1	(Greece) E Daniilidou (Serbia) A Krunić	6	5
(Russia) O Doroshina (Russia) A Morgina	1	2^{r}
3	(Ukraine) Y Beygelzimer (Turkey) Ç Büyükakçay	6	4	[10]
2	(United Kingdom) N Broady (Poland) M Linette	3	6	[5]

Final
1	(Greece) E Daniilidou (Serbia) A Krunić	3	3
3	(Ukraine) Y Beygelzimer (Turkey) Ç Büyükakçay	6	6
