= 2014 Ankara Cup – Singles =

Singles
- 2014 Ankara Cup

Final
- Champion: (Serbia) Aleksandra Krunić
- Runner-up: (Uzbekistan) Akgul Amanmuradova
- Score: 3–6, 6–2, 7–6^{(8–6)}

Events
Singles	Doubles
← 2013 ·	Ankara Cup	· 2015 →

Vitalia Diatchenko was the defending champion, however she chose not to participate.

The top seed Aleksandra Krunić won the title, defeating Akgul Amanmuradova in the final, 3–6, 6–2, 7–6^{(8–6)}.

== Seeds ==
1. (Serbia) Aleksandra Krunić (champion)
2. (Russia) Evgeniya Rodina (second round)
3. (Turkey) Çağla Büyükakçay (quarterfinals)
4. (Ukraine) Kateryna Kozlova (second round)
5. (Sweden) Rebecca Peterson (first round)
6. (France) Océane Dodin (first round)
7. (Russia) Marina Melnikova (second round)
8. (Ukraine) Yuliya Beygelzimer (semifinals)

== Main draw ==
=== Key ===
- Q = Qualifier
- WC = Wild card
- LL = Lucky loser
- Alt = Alternate
- SE = Special exempt
- PR = Protected ranking
- ITF = ITF entry
- JE = Junior exempt
- w/o = Walkover
- r = Retired
- d = Defaulted
- SR = Special ranking

=== Finals ===
Semifinals
1	(Serbia) Aleksandra Krunić	6	6
Q	(Russia) Valentyna Ivakhnenko	4	4
8	(Ukraine) Yuliya Beygelzimer	6	6^{1}	2
PR	(Uzbekistan) Akgul Amanmuradova	1	7^{7}	6

Final
1	(Serbia) Aleksandra Krunić	3	6	7^{8}
PR	(Uzbekistan) Akgul Amanmuradova	6	2	6^{6}

=== Top half ===
First round
1	(Serbia) A Krunić	6	6^{4}	6
(France) A Hesse	1	7^{7}	3
(Russia) M Sirotkina	3	2
(Ukraine) A Kalinina	6	6
(Russia) P Vinogradova	0	2
(Italy) G Barbieri	6	6
(Ukraine) O Ianchuk	4	5
7	(Russia) M Melnikova	6	7
4	(Ukraine) K Kozlova	6	7
Q	(Ukraine) A Shkudun	3	5
WC	(Turkey) İ Soylu	6	4	6^{3}
(France) J Coin	3	6	7^{7}
WC	(Turkey) İ Öğüt	2	3
(Uzbekistan) S Sharipova	6	6
Q	(Russia) V Ivakhnenko	6	6
5	(Sweden) R Peterson	1	2

Second round
1	(Serbia) A Krunić	6	6
(Ukraine) A Kalinina	4	3
(Italy) G Barbieri	7	7
7	(Russia) M Melnikova	5	5
4	(Ukraine) K Kozlova	4	4
(France) J Coin	6	6
(Uzbekistan) S Sharipova	3	3
Q	(Russia) V Ivakhnenko	6	6

Quarterfinals
1	(Serbia) A Krunić	6	6
(Italy) G Barbieri	1	1
(France) J Coin	4	7^{7}	2
Q	(Russia) V Ivakhnenko	6	6^{2}	6

Semifinals
1	(Serbia) A Krunić	6	6
Q	(Russia) V Ivakhnenko	4	4

=== Bottom half ===
First round
8	(Ukraine) Y Beygelzimer	6	6
WC	(Turkey) İ Kaftan	1	0
(Slovenia) N Kolar	6	2	6^{3}
Q	(Croatia) J Fett	3	6	7^{7}
(Russia) E Alexandrova	6^{5}	6	7^{7}
WC	(Turkey) B Eraydın	7^{7}	4	6^{4}
(Bulgaria) D Evtimova	1	1
3	(Turkey) Ç Büyükakçay	6	6
6	(France) O Dodin	3	6	3
PR	(Uzbekistan) A Amanmuradova	6	3	6
(Romania) PM Țig	6	6
(Italy) A Grymalska	1	2
(Belgium) Y Bonaventure	6	2	7
Q	(Ukraine) E Ianchuk	2	6	5
(Bulgaria) E Kostova	7^{9}	4	0
2	(Russia) E Rodina	6^{7}	6	6

Second round
8	(Ukraine) Y Beygelzimer	6	6
Q	(Croatia) J Fett	3	3
(Russia) E Alexandrova	3	7^{7}	3
3	(Turkey) Ç Büyükakçay	6	6^{4}	6
PR	(Uzbekistan) A Amanmuradova	7	7^{7}
(Romania) PM Țig	5	6^{4}
(Belgium) Y Bonaventure	6	6^{3}	6
2	(Russia) E Rodina	3	7^{7}	2

Quarterfinals
8	(Ukraine) Y Beygelzimer	6	7^{7}
3	(Turkey) Ç Büyükakçay	2	6^{4}
PR	(Uzbekistan) A Amanmuradova	6^{4}	6	6
(Belgium) Y Bonaventure	7^{7}	4	4

Semifinals
8	(Ukraine) Y Beygelzimer	6	6^{1}	2
PR	(Uzbekistan) A Amanmuradova	1	7^{7}	6
