= 2016 Soho Square Ladies Tournament =

- Date: 17–23 October
- Edition: 2nd
- Category: ITF Women's Circuit
- Prize money: $100,000
- Surface: Hard
- Location: Sharm el-Sheikh, Egypt

Champions

Singles
- (Croatia) Donna Vekić

Doubles
- (Romania) Irina Maria Bara / (Ukraine) Alona Fomina
← 2013 ·	Soho Square Ladies Tournament	· 2017 →

The 2016 Soho Square Ladies Tournament was a professional tennis tournament played on outdoor hard courts. It was the 2nd edition of the tournament and part of the 2016 ITF Women's Circuit, offering a total of $100,000 in prize money. It took place in Sharm el-Sheikh, Egypt, on 17–23 October 2016.

== Singles main draw entrants ==
=== Seeds ===
Country	Player	Rank^{1}	Seed
JPN	Nao Hibino	84	1
GRE	Maria Sakkari	97	2
ROU	Ana Bogdan	118	3
CRO	Donna Vekić	120	4
ESP	Sara Sorribes Tormo	127	5
ESP	Sílvia Soler Espinosa	129	6
NED	Cindy Burger	138	7
SUI	Amra Sadiković	146	8

- ^{1} Rankings as of 10 October 2016.

=== Other entrants ===
The following player received a wildcard into the singles main draw:

- (Egypt) Ola Abou Zekry
- (Egypt) Lamis Alhussein Abdel Aziz
- (Russia) Vitalia Diatchenko
- (Romania) Ana Bianca Mihăilă

The following players received entry from the qualifying draw:

- (Romania) Jaqueline Cristian
- (Italy) Giulia Gatto-Monticone
- (Germany) Julia Wachaczyk
- (Ukraine) Dayana Yastremska

The following player received entry by a lucky loser spot:

- (Egypt) Sandra Samir

== Champions ==
=== Singles ===
- (Croatia) Donna Vekić def. (Spain) Sara Sorribes Tormo, 6–2, 6–7^{(7–9)}, 6–3

=== Doubles ===
- (Romania) Irina Maria Bara / (Ukraine) Alona Fomina def. (Argentina) Guadalupe Pérez Rojas / (Switzerland) Jil Teichmann, 6–2, 6–1
