= 2016 Soho Square Ladies Tournament – Singles =

Singles
- 2016 Soho Square Ladies Tournament

Final
- Champion: (Croatia) Donna Vekić
- Runner-up: (Spain) Sara Sorribes Tormo
- Score: 6–2, 6–7^{(7–9)}, 6–3

Events
Singles	Doubles
← 2013 ·	Soho Square Ladies Tournament	· 2017 →

Victoria Kan is the defending champion, having won the previous edition in 2013.

Donna Vekić won the title, defeating Sara Sorribes Tormo in the final, 6–2, 6–7^{(7–9)}, 6–3.

== Seeds ==
1. (Japan) Nao Hibino (first round)
2. (Greece) Maria Sakkari (semifinals)
3. (Romania) Ana Bogdan (second round)
4. (Croatia) Donna Vekić (champion)
5. (Spain) Sara Sorribes Tormo (final)
6. (Spain) Sílvia Soler Espinosa (second round)
7. (Netherlands) Cindy Burger (second round)
8. (Switzerland) Amra Sadiković (withdrew)

== Main draw ==
=== Key ===
- Q = Qualifier
- WC = Wild card
- LL = Lucky loser
- Alt = Alternate
- SE = Special exempt
- PR = Protected ranking
- ITF = ITF entry
- JE = Junior exempt
- w/o = Walkover
- r = Retired
- d = Defaulted
- SR = Special ranking

=== Finals ===
Semifinals
(Russia) Anastasiya Komardina
5	(Spain) Sara Sorribes Tormo	w/o
4	(Croatia) Donna Vekić	6^{3}	6	6
2	(Greece) Maria Sakkari	7^{7}	4	1

Final
5	(Spain) Sara Sorribes Tormo	2	7^{9}	3
4	(Croatia) Donna Vekić	6	6^{7}	6

=== Top half ===
First round
1	(Japan) N Hibino	1	2
(Russia) A Komardina	6	6
Q	(Germany) J Wachaczyk	6	6
(India) A Raina	4	1
Q	(Ukraine) D Yastremska	6	6
(Romania) C Dinu	4	3
(Switzerland) J Teichmann	4	3
6	(Spain) S Soler Espinosa	6	6
3	(Romania) A Bogdan	6	6
(Spain) G García Pérez	4	4
(Romania) IM Bara	5	6	2
(North Macedonia) L Gjorcheska	7	1	6
(Belgium) A-S Mestach	6	6
(Turkey) B Eraydın	4	1
(Uzbekistan) A Amanmuradova	6	3	1
5	(Spain) S Sorribes Tormo	3	6	6

Second round
(Russia) A Komardina	5	6	6
Q	(Germany) J Wachaczyk	7	2	2
Q	(Ukraine) D Yastremska	4	6	6
6	(Spain) S Soler Espinosa	6	1	1
3	(Romania) A Bogdan	6	5	3
(North Macedonia) L Gjorcheska	3	7	6
(Belgium) A-S Mestach	2	5
5	(Spain) S Sorribes Tormo	6	7

Quarterfinals
(Russia) A Komardina	6^{3}	6	7
Q	(Ukraine) D Yastremska	7^{7}	1	5
(North Macedonia) L Gjorcheska	7	3	3
5	(Spain) S Sorribes Tormo	5	6	6

Semifinals
(Russia) A Komardina
5	(Spain) S Sorribes Tormo	w/o

=== Bottom half ===
First round
LL	(Egypt) S Samir	4	4
(Netherlands) A Rus	6	6
Q	(Italy) G Gatto-Monticone	6	6
WC	(Egypt) L Alhussein Abdel Aziz	0	1
Q	(Romania) J Cristian	6	6
(Hungary) RL Jani	2	2
(Brazil) L Pigossi	1	1
4	(Croatia) D Vekić	6	6
7	(Netherlands) C Burger	7	6
WC	(Romania) AB Mihăilă	5	2
(Czech Republic) K Muchová	6	6
(Romania) N Dascălu	4	4
WC	(Egypt) O Abou Zekry	1	2
WC	(Russia) V Diatchenko	6	6
(Italy) A Grymalska	5	1
2	(Greece) M Sakkari	7	6

Second round
(Netherlands) A Rus	6	6
Q	(Italy) G Gatto-Monticone	1	4
Q	(Romania) J Cristian
4	(Croatia) D Vekić	w/o
7	(Netherlands) C Burger	2	3
(Czech Republic) K Muchová	6	6
WC	(Russia) V Diatchenko	4	3
2	(Greece) M Sakkari	6	6

Quarterfinals
(Netherlands) A Rus	0	6	1
4	(Croatia) D Vekić	6	4	6
(Czech Republic) K Muchová	4	1
2	(Greece) M Sakkari	6	6

Semifinals
4	(Croatia) D Vekić	6^{3}	6	6
2	(Greece) M Sakkari	7^{7}	4	1
