= 2013 Soho Square Ladies Tournament – Singles =

Singles
- 2013 Soho Square Ladies Tournament

Final
- Champion: (Russia) Victoria Kan
- Runner-up: (Slovenia) Nastja Kolar
- Score: 6–4, 6–4

Events
Singles	Doubles
Soho Square Ladies Tournament	· 2016 →

This is a new event on the 2013 ITF Women's Circuit.

Victoria Kan won the tournament, defeating Nastja Kolar in the final, 6–4, 6–4.

== Seeds ==
1. (Estonia) Kaia Kanepi (second round)
2. (Austria) Patricia Mayr-Achleitner (second round)
3. (Kazakhstan) Yulia Putintseva (quarterfinals)
4. (Spain) Estrella Cabeza Candela (first round)
5. (Slovenia) ~~Tadeja Majerič~~ (withdrew)
6. (Russia) Alexandra Panova (second round)
7. (Russia) Nina Bratchikova (first round)
8. (Slovakia) Kristína Kučová (second round)

== Main draw ==
=== Key ===
- Q = Qualifier
- WC = Wild card
- LL = Lucky loser
- Alt = Alternate
- SE = Special exempt
- PR = Protected ranking
- ITF = ITF entry
- JE = Junior exempt
- w/o = Walkover
- r = Retired
- d = Defaulted
- SR = Special ranking

=== Finals ===
Semifinals
Q	(Slovenia) Nastja Kolar	6	6
WC	(Russia) Yuliya Kalabina	4	3
(Russia) Victoria Kan	7	1	6
(Switzerland) Timea Bacsinszky	5	6	1

Final
Q	(Slovenia) Nastja Kolar	4	4
(Russia) Victoria Kan	6	6

=== Top half ===
First round
1	(Estonia) K Kanepi	6	6
(Hungary) R-L Jani	1	3
(Austria) M Klaffner	4	6	2
(Serbia) J Jakšić	6	3	6
Q	(Romania) R Olaru	5	6	3
Q	(Slovenia) N Kolar	7	3	6
(Russia) V Solovyeva	2	7	7
7	(Russia) N Bratchikova	6	5	5
3	(Kazakhstan) Y Putintseva	6	7
WC	(Oman) F Al-Nabhani	2	5
(Romania) A Mitu	6	6
(Germany) A Schäfer	2	3
WC	(Russia) Y Kalabina	6	7
Q	(Chile) D Seguel	4	5
(Czech Republic) T Smitková	6	3	6
LL	(Slovenia) M Zec Peškirič	3	6	2

Second round
1	(Estonia) K Kanepi	6	4	3
(Serbia) J Jakšić	3	6	6
Q	(Slovenia) N Kolar	6	6
(Russia) V Solovyeva	2	2
3	(Kazakhstan) Y Putintseva	6	7^{7}
(Romania) A Mitu	4	6^{4}
WC	(Russia) Y Kalabina	6	2
(Czech Republic) T Smitková	3	1^{r}

Quarterfinals
(Serbia) J Jakšić	6	5	3
Q	(Slovenia) N Kolar	4	7	6
3	(Kazakhstan) Y Putintseva	6^{4}	6	3
WC	(Russia) Y Kalabina	7^{7}	1	6

Semifinals
Q	(Slovenia) N Kolar	6	6
WC	(Russia) Y Kalabina	4	3

=== Bottom half ===
First round
8	(Slovakia) K Kučová	5	6	6
(Russia) A Kudryavtseva	7	4	2
(Brazil) PC Gonçalves	2	1
JE	(Czech Republic) K Siniaková	6	6
(Russia) V Kan	6	6
(Switzerland) A Sadiković	2	2
Q	(Slovakia) K Morgošová	6	6
4	(Spain) E Cabeza Candela	4	3
6	(Russia) A Panova	6	6
WC	(France) P Payet	0	1
(Germany) K Barrois	6	7
(Italy) A Brianti	2	5
PR	(Russia) E Rodina	1	0
(Switzerland) T Bacsinszky	6	6
WC	(Russia) M Shamayko	2	2
2	(Austria) P Mayr-Achleitner	6	6

Second round
8	(Slovakia) K Kučová	6	6^{6}	4
JE	(Czech Republic) K Siniaková	3	7^{8}	6
(Russia) V Kan	6	6
Q	(Slovakia) K Morgošová	3	2
6	(Russia) A Panova	3	5
(Germany) K Barrois	6	7
(Switzerland) T Bacsinszky	6	6
2	(Austria) P Mayr-Achleitner	1	3

Quarterfinals
JE	(Czech Republic) K Siniaková	2	1
(Russia) V Kan	6	6
(Germany) K Barrois	3	3
(Switzerland) T Bacsinszky	6	6

Semifinals
(Russia) V Kan	7	1	6
(Switzerland) T Bacsinszky	5	6	1
