= 2014 Ankara Cup – Doubles =

Doubles
- 2014 Ankara Cup

Final
- Champions: (Georgia (country)) Ekaterine Gorgodze (Slovenia) Nastja Kolar
- Runners-up: (Ukraine) Oleksandra Korashvili (Bulgaria) Elitsa Kostova
- Score: 6–4, 7–6^{(7–5)}

Events
Singles	Doubles
← 2013 ·	Ankara Cup	· 2015 →

Yuliya Beygelzimer and Çağla Büyükakçay were the defending champions. However, they lost in the first round to Diana Buzean and Réka-Luca Jani.

Ekaterine Gorgodze and Nastja Kolar won the title, defeating Oleksandra Korashvili and Elitsa Kostova in the final, 6–4, 7–6^{(7–5)}.

== Seeds ==
1. (Serbia) Aleksandra Krunić / (Russia) Evgeniya Rodina (quarterfinals)
2. (Ukraine) Yuliya Beygelzimer / (Turkey) Çağla Büyükakçay (first round)
3. (France) Julie Coin / (France) Amandine Hesse (first round)
4. (Belarus) Lidziya Marozava / (Russia) Marina Melnikova (first round)

== Draw ==
=== Key ===
- Q = Qualifier
- WC = Wild card
- LL = Lucky loser
- Alt = Alternate
- SE = Special exempt
- PR = Protected ranking
- ITF = ITF entry
- JE = Junior exempt
- w/o = Walkover
- r = Retired
- d = Defaulted
- SR = Special ranking

First round
1	(Serbia) A Krunić (Russia) E Rodina	6	6
(Ukraine) O Ianchuk (Russia) V Ivakhnenko	4	4
WC	(Turkey) A Aksu (Turkey) İ Soylu	6	6
(Uzbekistan) A Amanmuradova (Russia) M Sirotkina	4	4
4	(Belarus) L Marozava (Russia) M Melnikova	6	1	[6]
(Georgia (country)) E Gorgodze (Slovenia) N Kolar	3	6	[10]
WC	(Italy) A Grymalska (Turkey) D Yurtkuran	6^{1}	5
(Turkey) M Sezer (Bulgaria) I Shinikova	7^{7}	7
(Ukraine) O Korashvili (Bulgaria) E Kostova	6	6
(Bulgaria) D Evtimova (Austria) S Klemenschits	2	3
(Latvia) J Ostapenko (Sweden) R Peterson	6	6
3	(France) J Coin (France) A Hesse	1	3
(Turkey) B Eraydın (Uzbekistan) S Sharipova	6	6
WC	(Turkey) E Kökçe (Georgia (country)) S Kvatsabaia	1	1
(Romania) D Buzean (Hungary) R-L Jani	7	6
2	(Ukraine) Y Beygelzimer (Turkey) Ç Büyükakçay	5	3

Quarterfinals
1	(Serbia) A Krunić (Russia) E Rodina	5	3
WC	(Turkey) A Aksu (Turkey) İ Soylu	7	6
(Georgia (country)) E Gorgodze (Slovenia) N Kolar	6	2	[10]
(Turkey) M Sezer (Bulgaria) I Shinikova	4	6	[8]
(Ukraine) O Korashvili (Bulgaria) E Kostova	7^{7}	1	[10]
(Latvia) J Ostapenko (Sweden) R Peterson	6^{4}	6	[3]
(Turkey) B Eraydın (Uzbekistan) S Sharipova	2	3
(Romania) D Buzean (Hungary) R-L Jani	6	6

Semifinals
WC	(Turkey) A Aksu (Turkey) İ Soylu	4	6	[11]
(Georgia (country)) E Gorgodze (Slovenia) N Kolar	6	4	[13]
(Ukraine) O Korashvili (Bulgaria) E Kostova	1	7^{7}	[10]
(Romania) D Buzean (Hungary) R-L Jani	6	6^{1}	[5]

Final
(Georgia (country)) E Gorgodze (Slovenia) N Kolar	6	7^{7}
(Ukraine) O Korashvili (Bulgaria) E Kostova	4	6^{5}
