= 2015 Ankara Cup – Doubles =

Doubles
- 2015 Ankara Cup

Final
- Champions: (Spain) María José Martínez Sánchez (Russia) Marina Melnikova
- Runners-up: (Poland) Paula Kania (Netherlands) Lesley Kerkhove
- Score: 6–4, 5–7, [10–8]

Events
Singles	Doubles
← 2014 ·	Ankara Cup	· 2016 →

Ekaterine Gorgodze and Nastja Kolar were the defending champions, but both players chose not to participate.

María José Martínez Sánchez and Marina Melnikova won the title, defeating Paula Kania and Lesley Kerkhove in the final, 6–4, 5–7, [10–8].

== Seeds ==
1. (Turkey) Çağla Büyükakçay / (Serbia) Aleksandra Krunić (semifinals)
2. (Spain) María José Martínez Sánchez / (Russia) Marina Melnikova (champions)
3. (Poland) Paula Kania / (Netherlands) Lesley Kerkhove (final)
4. (Netherlands) Cindy Burger / (Georgia (country)) Sofia Shapatava (first round)

== Draw ==
=== Key ===
- Q = Qualifier
- WC = Wild card
- LL = Lucky loser
- Alt = Alternate
- SE = Special exempt
- PR = Protected ranking
- ITF = ITF entry
- JE = Junior exempt
- w/o = Walkover
- r = Retired
- d = Defaulted
- SR = Special ranking

First round
1	(Turkey) Ç Büyükakçay (Serbia) A Krunić	6	6
WC	(Turkey) İ Öğüt (Turkey) D Paykoç	0	1
(Sweden) C Lister (Brazil) L Pigossi	6	6
(Romania) IL Roșca (Romania) OG Simion	3	3
3	(Poland) P Kania (Netherlands) L Kerkhove	6	6
(Turkey) B Eraydın (North Macedonia) L Gjorcheska	4	2
(Turkey) A Aksu (Turkey) M Sezer	6	6
(Romania) M Buzărnescu (Romania) C Dinu	2	4
WC	(Turkey) S Övünç (Turkey) M Topsel	1	4
(Russia) M Marfutina (Russia) N Vikhlyantseva	6	6
(Germany) K Grajdek (Russia) E Yashina	6	6
4	(Netherlands) C Burger (Georgia (country)) S Shapatava	4	4
(Slovenia) D Jakupović (United Kingdom) T Moore	3	1
(Uzbekistan) A Amanmuradova (Romania) A Cadanțu	6	6
WC	(Turkey) B Cengiz (Slovakia) M Hončová	3	3
2	(Spain) MJ Martínez Sánchez (Russia) M Melnikova	6	6

Quarterfinals
1	(Turkey) Ç Büyükakçay (Serbia) A Krunić	6	6
(Sweden) C Lister (Brazil) L Pigossi	1	3
3	(Poland) P Kania (Netherlands) L Kerkhove	6	6
(Turkey) A Aksu (Turkey) M Sezer	3	3
(Russia) M Marfutina (Russia) N Vikhlyantseva	6	7
(Germany) K Grajdek (Russia) E Yashina	4	5
(Uzbekistan) A Amanmuradova (Romania) A Cadanțu	3	0^{r}
2	(Spain) MJ Martínez Sánchez (Russia) M Melnikova	6	0

Semifinals
1	(Turkey) Ç Büyükakçay (Serbia) A Krunić	6	5	[8]
3	(Poland) P Kania (Netherlands) L Kerkhove	4	7	[10]
(Russia) M Marfutina (Russia) N Vikhlyantseva	3	1
2	(Spain) MJ Martínez Sánchez (Russia) M Melnikova	6	6

Final
3	(Poland) P Kania (Netherlands) L Kerkhove	4	7	[8]
2	(Spain) MJ Martínez Sánchez (Russia) M Melnikova	6	5	[10]
