= 2013 Ankara Cup – Singles =

Singles
- 2013 Ankara Cup

Final
- Champion: (Russia) Vitalia Diatchenko
- Runner-up: (Russia) Marta Sirotkina
- Score: 6–7^{(3–7)}, 6–4, 6–4

Events
Singles	Doubles
- Ankara Cup

Ana Savić was the defending champion, having won the event in 2012, but did not participate in 2013.

Vitalia Diatchenko won the tournament, defeating Marta Sirotkina in the all-Russian final, 6–7^{(3–7)}, 6–4, 6–4.

== Seeds ==
1. (Belgium) Alison Van Uytvanck (first round)
2. (Russia) Marta Sirotkina (final)
3. (Serbia) Aleksandra Krunić (second round)
4. (Belgium) An-Sophie Mestach (second round; retired)
5. (Poland) Magda Linette (semifinals)
6. (Russia) Victoria Kan (second round)
7. (Turkey) Çağla Büyükakçay (quarterfinals)
8. (Montenegro) Danka Kovinić (quarterfinals)

== Main draw ==
Key

- Q = Qualifier
- WC = Wild card
- LL = Lucky loser
- Alt = Alternate
- ITF = ITF entry
- PR = Protected ranking
- SR = Special ranking
- SE = Special exempt
- JE = Junior exempt
- JR = Junior Accelerator Programme entrant
- CO = College Accelerator Programme entrant
- NG = Next Gen Accelerator Program entrant
- w/o = Walkover
- r = Retired
- d = Defaulted

=== Finals ===
Semifinals
PR	(Russia) Vitalia Diatchenko	6	6
5	(Poland) Magda Linette	2	3
(United Kingdom) Naomi Broady	4	6	4
2	(Russia) Marta Sirotkina	6	1	6

Final
PR	(Russia) Vitalia Diatchenko	6^{3}	6	6
2	(Russia) Marta Sirotkina	7^{7}	4	4

=== Top half ===
First round
1	(Belgium) A Van Uytvanck	2	1
(Germany) C Witthöft	6	6
(France) A Hesse	6	6
Q	(Georgia (country)) E Gorgodze	2	0
PR	(Russia) V Diatchenko	6	2	6
(Turkey) B Eraydın	4	6	1
Q	(Ukraine) G Poznikhirenko	5	3
6	(Russia) V Kan	7	6
4	(Belgium) A-S Mestach	6	6
WC	(Turkey) İ Kaftan	2	0
(Italy) G Barbieri	4	2
(United Kingdom) T Moore	6	6
(Greece) E Daniilidou	4	7	6
(Germany) K Barrois	6	5	4
WC	(Turkey) E Tomey	1	1
5	(Poland) M Linette	6	6

Second round
(Germany) C Witthöft	3	3
(France) A Hesse	6	6
PR	(Russia) V Diatchenko	6	6
6	(Russia) V Kan	1	4
4	(Belgium) A-S Mestach	6^{5}	0^{r}
(United Kingdom) T Moore	7^{7}	1
(Greece) E Daniilidou	3	7^{7}	4
5	(Poland) M Linette	6	6^{4}	6

Quarterfinals
(France) A Hesse	3	2
PR	(Russia) V Diatchenko	6	6
(United Kingdom) T Moore	2	2
5	(Poland) M Linette	6	6

Semifinals
PR	(Russia) V Diatchenko	6	6
5	(Poland) M Linette	2	3

=== Bottom half ===
First round
8	(Montenegro) D Kovinić	6	7^{7}
WC	(Turkey) İ Soylu	3	6^{4}
(Russia) Y Kalabina	2	6	4
(Bosnia and Herzegovina) J Tinjić	6	0	6
(United Kingdom) N Broady	6	6
WC	(Turkey) İ Öğüt	3	2
Q	(France) A Collombon	6^{1}	1
3	(Serbia) A Krunić	7^{7}	6
7	(Turkey) Ç Büyükakçay	6	6
(Russia) A Kudryavtseva	2	4
(Czech Republic) E Birnerová	4	0^{r}
(France) P Parmentier	6	0
(Russia) M Gasparyan	3	1^{r}
Q	(Russia) P Leykina	6	2
(Ukraine) Y Beygelzimer	3	2
2	(Russia) M Sirotkina	6	6

Second round
8	(Montenegro) D Kovinić	7	6
(Bosnia and Herzegovina) J Tinjić	5	3
(United Kingdom) N Broady	7^{7}	6
3	(Serbia) A Krunić	6^{4}	0
7	(Turkey) Ç Büyükakçay	6	6^{5}	6
(France) P Parmentier	1	7^{7}	2
Q	(Russia) P Leykina	0	1
2	(Russia) M Sirotkina	6	6

Quarterfinals
8	(Montenegro) D Kovinić	7^{7}	4	6^{3}
(United Kingdom) N Broady	6^{1}	6	7^{7}
7	(Turkey) Ç Büyükakçay	4	3
2	(Russia) M Sirotkina	6	6

Semifinals
(United Kingdom) N Broady	4	6	4
2	(Russia) M Sirotkina	6	1	6

== Bibliography ==
- Main draw
