= Snehadevi Reddy =

Indian tennis player

- Full name: Snehadevi S. Reddy
- Country (sports): India
- Born: 13 February 1997 (age 28)
- Plays: Right (two-handed backhand)
- Prize money: $28,306

Singles
- Career record: 116–82
- Career titles: 2 ITF
- Highest ranking: No. 449 (1 August 2016)

Doubles
- Career record: 70–70
- Career titles: 2 ITF
- Highest ranking: No. 517 (16 May 2016)

Snehadevi S. Reddy (born 13 February 1997) is an Indian former tennis player.

Reddy has a career-high WTA rankings of 449 in singles and 517 in doubles. She won two singles and two doubles titles on tournaments of the ITF Circuit.

On the junior tour, Reddy had a career-high ranking of 59, achieved on 6 January 2014.

Reddy has represented India only one time in Fed Cup, and she lost that match.

== ITF Circuit finals ==
Legend
$25,000 tournaments
$10,000 tournaments

=== Singles: 2 (2 titles) ===
Result	Date	Tournament	Surface	Opponent	Score
Win	Sep 2015	ITF Hyderabad, India	Clay	(India) Sai Chamarthi	7–6^{(4)}, 7–5
Win	Jun 2016	ITF Grand-Baie, Mauritius	Hard	(Zimbabwe) Valeria Bhunu	6–4, 4–6, 6–3

=== Doubles: 8 (2 titles, 6 runner–ups) ===
Result	W–L	Date	Tournament	Tier	Surface	Partner	Opponents	Score
Loss	0–1	Nov 2014	ITF Sharm El Sheikh, Egypt	10,000	Hard	(India) Dhruthi Tatachar Venugopal	(Russia) Anna Morgina (Russia) Anastasia Pribylova	4–6, 4–6
Win	1–1	May 2015	ITF Bhopal, India	10,000	Hard	(India) Dhruthi Tatachar Venugopal	(India) Sharmada Balu (Chinese Taipei) Hsu Ching-wen	0–6, 7–6^{(1)}, [10–3]
Loss	1–2	Jun 2015	ITF Grand-Baie, Mauritius	10,000	Hard	(India) Dhruthi Tatachar Venugopal	(South Africa) Ilze Hattingh (South Africa) Madrie Le Roux	2–6, 4–6
Loss	1–3	Mar 2016	ITF Hammamet, Tunisia	10,000	Clay	(Italy) Claudia Giovine	(Austria) Julia Grabher (Australia) Isabelle Wallace	1–6, 3–6
Loss	1–4	Mar 2016	ITF Hammamet, Tunisia	10,000	Clay	(Egypt) Ola Abou Zekry	(Germany) Katharina Hobgarski (Romania) Elena Gabriela Ruse	4–6, 4–6
Win	2–4	Jun 2016	ITF Réunion, France	10,000	Hard	(France) Pauline Payet	(India) Kyra Shroff (India) Dhruthi Tatachar Venugopal	6–4, 2–6, [10–6]
Loss	2–5	Sep 2016	ITF Pula, Italy	10,000	Clay	(Bosnia and Herzegovina) Jelena Simić	(Czech Republic) Petra Krejsová (Italy) Dalila Spiteri	0–6, 6–1, [3–10]
Loss	2–6	Nov 2017	ITF Vinaròs, Spain	10,000	Clay	(Ecuador) Charlotte Römer	(Japan) Misa Eguchi (Japan) Akiko Omae	2–6, 2–6
