= 2015 Ankara Cup – Singles =

Singles
- 2015 Ankara Cup

Final
- Champion: (Serbia) Ivana Jorović
- Runner-up: (Turkey) Çağla Büyükakçay
- Score: 7–6^{(7–3)}, 3–6, 6–2

Events
Singles	Doubles
← 2014 ·	Ankara Cup	· 2016 →

Aleksandra Krunić was the defending champion, but lost in the first round to Amra Sadiković.

Ivana Jorović won the title, defeating Çağla Büyükakçay in the final, 7–6^{(7–3)}, 3–6, 6–2.

== Seeds ==
1. (Serbia) Aleksandra Krunić (first round)
2. (Turkey) Çağla Büyükakçay (final)
3. (Croatia) Jana Fett (semifinals; retired)
4. (Poland) Paula Kania (second round)
5. (Turkey) İpek Soylu (second round)
6. (Netherlands) Cindy Burger (quarterfinals)
7. (Georgia (country)) Sofia Shapatava (first round)
8. (Netherlands) Lesley Kerkhove (quarterfinals)

== Main draw ==
=== Key ===
- Q = Qualifier
- WC = Wild card
- LL = Lucky loser
- Alt = Alternate
- SE = Special exempt
- PR = Protected ranking
- ITF = ITF entry
- JE = Junior exempt
- w/o = Walkover
- r = Retired
- d = Defaulted
- SR = Special ranking

=== Finals ===
Semifinals
(Serbia) Ivana Jorović	6	5	3
3	(Croatia) Jana Fett	2	7	1^{r}
(Romania) Alexandra Cadanțu	4	7^{7}	5
2	(Turkey) Çağla Büyükakçay	6	6^{2}	7

Final
(Serbia) Ivana Jorović	7^{7}	3	6
2	(Turkey) Çağla Büyükakçay	6^{3}	6	2

=== Top half ===
First round
1	(Serbia) A Krunić	6	2	6^{6}
(Switzerland) A Sadiković	3	6	7^{8}
(Slovenia) D Jakupović	5	3
(Serbia) I Jorović	7	6
LL	(Russia) E Yashina	6	5	4
WC	(Turkey) İ Öğüt	2	7	6
WC	(Turkey) S Övünç	2	2
6	(Netherlands) C Burger	6	6
3	(Croatia) J Fett	6	6
(North Macedonia) L Gjorcheska	4	0
(United Kingdom) T Moore	5	7	6
Q	(Russia) M Marfutina	7	5	3
Q	(Romania) OG Simion	3	3
(Russia) N Vikhlyantseva	6	6
(Romania) S Cîrstea	1	1
5	(Turkey) İ Soylu	6	6

Second round
(Switzerland) A Sadiković	4	4
(Serbia) I Jorović	6	6
WC	(Turkey) İ Öğüt	5	3
6	(Netherlands) C Burger	7	6
3	(Croatia) J Fett	6	2	6
(United Kingdom) T Moore	2	6	2
(Russia) N Vikhlyantseva	6	6
5	(Turkey) İ Soylu	3	4

Quarterfinals
(Serbia) I Jorović	6	6
6	(Netherlands) C Burger	3	2
3	(Croatia) J Fett	0	6	6
(Russia) N Vikhlyantseva	6	2	2

Semifinals
(Serbia) I Jorović	6	5	3
3	(Croatia) J Fett	2	7	1^{r}

=== Bottom half ===
First round
7	(Georgia (country)) S Shapatava	4	6^{8}
(Romania) C Dinu	6	7^{10}
(Turkey) A Aksu	4	3
Q	(Slovakia) M Hončová	6	6
(Turkey) B Eraydın	6^{6}	3
(Romania) A Cadanțu	7^{8}	6
Q	(Ukraine) G Poznikhirenko	5	3
4	(Poland) P Kania	7	6
8	(Netherlands) L Kerkhove	3	6	7^{7}
(Uzbekistan) A Amanmuradova	6	4	6^{4}
WC	(Turkey) M Topsel	2	0
PR	(Spain) MJ Martínez Sánchez	6	6
(Russia) M Melnikova	6	6
(Romania) M Buzărnescu	2	2
WC	(Turkey) B Cengiz	0	1
2	(Turkey) Ç Büyükakçay	6	6

Second round
(Romania) C Dinu	6	6
Q	(Slovakia) M Hončová	2	2
(Romania) A Cadanțu	6	7
4	(Poland) P Kania	2	5
8	(Netherlands) L Kerkhove	6	6
PR	(Spain) MJ Martínez Sánchez	1	3
(Russia) M Melnikova	6^{2}	3
2	(Turkey) Ç Büyükakçay	7^{7}	6

Quarterfinals
(Romania) C Dinu	1	1
(Romania) A Cadanțu	6	6
8	(Netherlands) L Kerkhove	1	6^{5}
2	(Turkey) Ç Büyükakçay	6	7^{7}

Semifinals
(Romania) A Cadanțu	4	7^{7}	5
2	(Turkey) Ç Büyükakçay	6	6^{2}	7
