= 2013 Ankara Cup =

- Date: 16–22 December
- Edition: 3rd
- Category: ITF Women's Circuit
- Prize money: $50,000
- Surface: Hard (indoor)
- Location: Ankara, Turkey

Champions

Singles
- (Russia) Vitalia Diatchenko

Doubles
- (Ukraine) Yuliya Beygelzimer / (Turkey) Çağla Büyükakçay
- Ankara Cup

The 2013 Ankara Cup was a professional tennis tournament played on indoor hard courts. It was the third edition of the tournament which was part of the 2013 ITF Women's Circuit, offering a total of $50,000 in prize money. It took place in Ankara, Turkey, on 16–22 December 2013.

== Singles entrants ==
=== Seeds ===
Country	Player	Rank^{1}	Seed
BEL	Alison Van Uytvanck	112	1
RUS	Marta Sirotkina	136	2
SRB	Aleksandra Krunić	142	3
BEL	An-Sophie Mestach	144	4
POL	Magda Linette	152	5
RUS	Victoria Kan	153	6
TUR	Çağla Büyükakçay	162	7
MNE	Danka Kovinić	167	8

- ^{1} Rankings as of 9 December 2013

=== Other entrants ===
The following players received wildcards into the singles main draw:

- (Turkey) İrem Kaftan
- (Turkey) İnci Öğüt
- (Turkey) İpek Soylu
- (Turkey) Ege Tomey

The following players received entry from the qualifying draw:

- (France) Alix Collombon
- (Georgia (country)) Ekaterine Gorgodze
- (Russia) Polina Leykina
- (Ukraine) Ganna Poznikhirenko

The following player received entry by a protected ranking:

- (Russia) Vitalia Diatchenko

== Champions ==
=== Singles ===
- (Russia) Vitalia Diatchenko def. (Russia) Marta Sirotkina 6–7^{(3–7)}, 6–4, 6–4

=== Doubles ===
- (Ukraine) Yuliya Beygelzimer / (Turkey) Çağla Büyükakçay def. (Greece) Eleni Daniilidou / (Serbia) Aleksandra Krunić 6–3, 6–3
