= 2015 Ankara Cup =

- Date: 14–20 December
- Edition: 5th
- Category: ITF Women's Circuit
- Prize money: $50,000
- Surface: Hard / Indoor
- Location: Ankara, Turkey

Champions

Singles
- (Serbia) Ivana Jorović

Doubles
- (Spain) María José Martínez Sánchez / (Russia) Marina Melnikova
- Ankara Cup

The 2015 Ankara Cup was a professional tennis tournament played on indoor hard courts. It was the fourth edition of the tournament and part of the 2015 ITF Women's Circuit, offering a total of $50,000 in prize money. It took place in Ankara, Turkey, on 14–20 December, 2015.

== Singles main draw entrants ==
=== Seeds ===
Country	Player	Rank^{1}	Seed
SRB	Aleksandra Krunić	96	1
TUR	Çağla Büyükakçay	129	2
CRO	Jana Fett	151	3
POL	Paula Kania	152	4
TUR	İpek Soylu	158	5
NED	Cindy Burger	184	6
GEO	Sofia Shapatava	208	7
NED	Lesley Kerkhove	211	8

- ^{1} Rankings as of 7 December 2015.

=== Other entrants ===
The following players received wildcards into the singles main draw:

- (Turkey) Berfu Cengiz
- (Turkey) İnci Öğüt
- (Turkey) Selin Övünç
- (Turkey) Müge Topsel

The following players received entry from the qualifying draw:

- (Slovakia) Michaela Hončová
- (Russia) Maria Marfutina
- (Ukraine) Ganna Poznikhirenko
- (Romania) Oana Georgeta Simion

The following player received entry by a lucky loser spot:

- (Russia) Ekaterina Yashina

The following player received entry using a protected ranking:

- (Spain) María José Martínez Sánchez

== Champions ==
=== Singles ===
- (Serbia) Ivana Jorović def. (Turkey) Çağla Büyükakçay, 7–6^{(7–3)}, 3–6, 6–2

=== Doubles ===
- (Spain) María José Martínez Sánchez / (Russia) Marina Melnikova def. (Poland) Paula Kania / (Netherlands) Lesley Kerkhove, 6–4, 5–7, [10–8]
