= Soho Square Ladies Tournament =

ITF Women's Tour
- Event name: Sharm El Sheikh
- Location: Sharm El Sheikh, Egypt
- Venue: Soho Square
- Category: ITF Women's Circuit
- Surface: Hard (2016); Clay (2013)
- Draw: 32S/32Q/16D
- Prize money: $100,000

The Soho Square Ladies Tournament was a tournament for professional female tennis players played on outdoor hardcourts. The event was classified as a $100,000 ITF Women's Circuit tournament and was held in Sharm El Sheikh, Egypt. In 2013, the event was classified as a $75,000+H event and held on clay courts.

== Past finals ==
=== Singles ===
Year	Champion	Runner-up	Score
2013	(Russia) Victoria Kan	(Slovenia) Nastja Kolar	6–4, 6–4
2014–15	Not held		
2016	(Croatia) Donna Vekić	(Spain) Sara Sorribes Tormo	6–2, 6–7^{(7)}, 6–3

=== Doubles ===
Year	Champions	Runners-up	Score
2013	(Switzerland) Timea Bacsinszky (Germany) Kristina Barrois	(Russia) Anna Morgina (Czech Republic) Kateřina Siniaková	6–7^{(5)}, 6–0, [10–4]
2014–15	Not held		
2016	(Romania) Irina Bara (Ukraine) Alona Fomina	(Argentina) Guadalupe Pérez Rojas (Switzerland) Jil Teichmann	6–2, 6–1
