= Melanie Klaffner =

Austrian tennis player

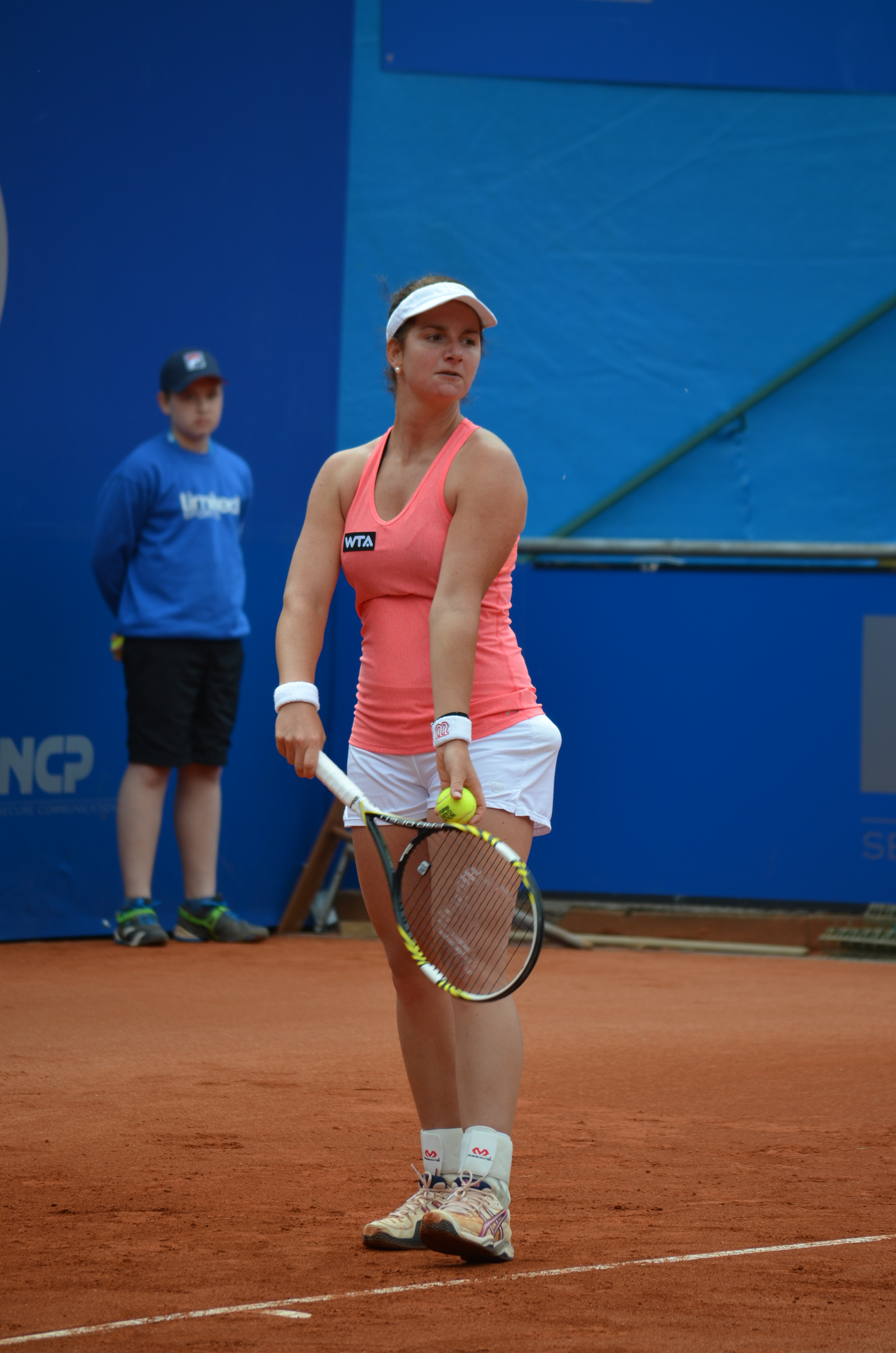
- Klaffner at the 2014 Nürnberger Versicherungscup
- Country (sports): Austria
- Born: 22 May 1990 (age 36) Waidhofen an der Ybbs, Austria
- Height: 1.71 m (5 ft 7 in)
- Retired: (last match played Sep 2024)
- Prize money: $259,182

Singles
- Career record: 429–314
- Career titles: 15 ITF
- Highest ranking: No. 175 (27 January 2014)

Grand Slam singles results
- Australian Open: Q1 (2014)
- French Open: Q1 (2014)
- Wimbledon: Q1 (2010)
- US Open: Q1 (2013)

Doubles
- Career record: 310–201
- Career titles: 26 ITF
- Highest ranking: No. 148 (25 May 2009)

Team competitions
- Fed Cup: 23–20

Melanie Klaffner (German pronunciation: [ˈklafnɐ]; born 22 May 1990) is an Austrian inactive tennis player. On 27 January 2014, she reached her best singles ranking of world No. 175. On 25 May 2009, she peaked at No. 148 in the WTA doubles rankings.

Klaffner won 15 singles titles and 26 doubles titles on the ITF Circuit.

Playing for the Austria Fed Cup team, Klaffner has a win–loss record of 23–20.

== ITF Circuit finals ==
=== Singles: 26 (15 titles, 11 runner-ups) ===
Legend $50,000 tournaments $25,000 tournaments $10/15,000 tournaments	Finals by surface Hard (8–2) Clay (6–9) Grass (1–0)

Result	W–L	Date	Tournament	Tier	Surface	Opponent	Score
Win	1–0	May 2006	ITF Balș, Romania	10,000	Clay	(Romania) Diana Enache	6–3, 6–4
Win	2–0	Jun 2007	ITF Lenzerheide, Switzerland	10,000	Clay	(Austria) Patricia Mayr	7–6^{(2)}, 6–4
Loss	2–1	Jun 2009	ITF Ystad, Sweden	25,000	Clay	(Slovakia) Lenka Wienerová	1–6, 6–7^{(3)}
Loss	2–2	Sep 2009	Telavi Open, Georgia	25,000	Clay	(Hungary) Réka Luca Jani	2–6, 4–6
Win	3–2	May 2010	ITF Tanjung Selor, Indonesia	25,000	Hard (i)	(Hong Kong) Zhang Ling	6–3, 7–6^{(1)}
Win	4–2	Sep 2010	Telavi Open, Georgia	25,000	Clay	(Ukraine) Irina Buryachok	3–6, 6–0, 3–0 ret.
Win	5–2	Feb 2012	ITF Leimen, Germany	10,000	Hard (i)	(Czech Republic) Tereza Smitková	2–6, 7–6^{(5)}, 6–1
Win	6–2	Dec 2012	ITF Djibouti	10,000	Hard	(France) Amandine Hesse	4–6, 7–5, 6–2
Win	7–2	Feb 2013	ITF Muzaffarnagar, India	25,000	Grass	(Ukraine) Veronika Kapshay	6–2, 6–0
Win	8–2	Mar 2013	ITF Sharm El Sheikh, Egypt	10,000	Hard	(Netherlands) Valeria Podda	6–3, 6–1
Win	9–2	Mar 2013	ITF Sharm El Sheikh	10,000	Hard	(Russia) Natela Dzalamidze	6–1, 6–0
Win	10–2	Apr 2013	ITF Phuket, Thailand	25,000	Hard (i)	(Serbia) Doroteja Erić	3–6, 6–3, 6–2
Loss	10–3	Jun 2013	ITF Ystad, Sweden	25,000	Clay	(Montenegro) Danka Kovinić	3–6, 3–6
Win	11–3	Jun 2013	ITF Zlín, Czech Republic	25,000	Clay	(Slovakia) Kristína Kučová	6–3, 6–2
Win	12–3	Feb 2015	ITF Sharm El Sheikh, Egypt	10,000	Hard	(Japan) Yuuki Tanaka	7–5, 3–6, 6–2
Loss	12–4	Mar 2015	ITF Sharm El Sheikh	10,000	Hard	(Thailand) Nudnida Luangnam	2–6, 4–6
Win	13–4	Nov 2015	ITF Casablanca, Morocco	25,000	Clay	(Russia) Irina Khromacheva	2–6, 7–6^{(7)}, 2–1 ret.
Win	14–4	Nov 2015	ITF Cairo, Egypt	10,000	Clay	(Hungary) Naomi Totka	6–4, 6–2
Win	15–4	Oct 2016	ITF Sharm El Sheikh	10,000	Hard	(Croatia) Ana Vrljić	7–5, 6–3
Loss	15–5	Dec 2017	ITF Cairo, Egypt	15,000	Clay	(Romania) Andreea Roșca	4–6, 4–6
Loss	15–6	Dec 2017	ITF Cairo, Egypt	15,000	Clay	(Romania) Andreea Roșca	1–6, 3–6
Loss	15–7	Aug 2018	ITF Savitaipale, Finland	15,000	Clay	(Romania) Alexandra Damaschin	6–2, 2–6, 0–6
Loss	15–8	Apr 2019	ITF Cairo, Egypt	W15	Clay	(Switzerland) Simona Waltert	6–7^{(6)}, 5–7
Loss	15–9	Nov 2019	ITF Sharm El Sheikh	W15	Hard	(Chinese Taipei) Lee Pei-chi	2–6, 6–2, 2–6
Loss	15–10	May 2021	ITF Heraklion, Greece	W15	Clay	(Germany) Lena Papadakis	3–6, 3–6
Loss	15–11	May 2022	ITF Cairo, Egypt	W15	Clay	(Chinese Taipei) Yang Ya-yi	3–6, 3–6

=== Doubles: 46 (26 titles, 20 runner-ups) ===
Legend $100,000 tournaments $50/60,000 tournaments $25,000 tournaments $10/15,000 tournaments	Finals by surface Hard (14–4) Clay (12–16)

Result	W–L	Date	Tournament	Tier	Surface	Partner	Opponents	Score
Loss	0–1	Apr 2007	ITF Bournemouth, UK	10k	Clay	(Switzerland) Nicole Riner	(Australia) Alenka Hubacek (Australia) Jessica Moore	7–5, 4–6, 4–6
Win	1–1	May 2007	ITF Rabat, Morocco	10k	Clay	(Romania) Mihaela Buzărnescu	(Italy) Silvia Disderi (Algeria) Samia Medjahdi	6–1, 6–4
Win	2–1	Jun 2007	ITF Oslo, Norway	10k	Clay	(Austria) Eva-Maria Hoch	(Sweden) Mari Andersson (Norway) Karoline Steiro	6–2, 6–3
Loss	2–2	Feb 2008	ITF Cali, Colombia	25k	Clay	(Belarus) Ksenia Milevskaya	(Argentina) Mailen Auroux (Uruguay) Estefanía Craciún	1–6, 4–6
Win	3–2	May 2008	ITF Antalya, Turkey	25k	Clay	(Belarus) Ksenia Milevskaya	(Georgia (country)) Oksana Kalashnikova (Turkey) Pemra Özgen	6–2, 7–5
Win	4–2	May 2008	ITF Galatina, Italy	25k	Clay	(Australia) Jessica Moore	(Brazil) Maria Fernanda Alves (Argentina) María Irigoyen	3–6, 6–1, [10–6]
Win	5–2	Jun 2008	Grado Tennis Cup, Italy	25k	Clay	(Colombia) Mariana Duque Mariño	(Mauritius) Marinne Giraud (Australia) Christina Wheeler	6–1, 6–2
Loss	5–3	Jun 2008	ITF Mont-de-Marsan, France	25k	Clay	(Portugal) Frederica Piedade	(Turkey) İpek Şenoğlu (Portugal) Neuza Silva	4–6, 2–6
Win	6–3	Oct 2008	ITF Istanbul, Turkey	25k	Hard (i)	(Bosnia and Herzegovina) Sandra Martinović	(Turkey) Çağla Büyükakçay (Turkey) Pemra Özgen	6–4, 6–7^{(5)}, [10–6]
Loss	6–4	Feb 2009	ITF Stockholm, Sweden	25k	Hard (i)	(Belarus) Ksenia Milevskaya	(France) Violette Huck (Finland) Emma Laine	6–3, 6–7^{(5)}, [8–10]
Win	7–4	Feb 2009	ITF Biberach, Germany	50k	Hard (i)	(Austria) Sandra Klemenschits	(Germany) Kristina Barrois (Austria) Yvonne Meusburger	3–6, 6–4, [17–15]
Loss	7–5	Apr 2009	ITF Osprey, United States	25k	Clay	(Canada) Heidi El Tabakh	(United States) Lindsay Lee-Waters (United States) Story Tweedie-Yates	3–6, 7–6^{(5)}, [10–12]
Win	8–5	May 2009	ITF Indian Harbour Beach, United States	50k	Clay	(Canada) Heidi El Tabakh	(Ukraine) Tetiana Luzhanska (United States) Lilia Osterloh	6–3, 3–6, [10–7]
Loss	8–6	Jun 2009	ITF Ystad, Sweden	25k	Clay	(Sweden) Hanna Nooni	(Sweden) Sofia Arvidsson (Sweden) Sandra Roma	4–6, 4–6
Loss	8–7	Aug 2009	ITF Moscow, Russia	25k	Clay	(Ukraine) Veronika Kapshay	(Russia) Ekaterina Ivanova (Russia) Arina Rodionova	2–6, 2–6
Loss	8–8	Aug 2009	ITF Katowice, Poland	25k	Clay	(Sweden) Johanna Larsson	(Poland) Karolina Kosińska (Romania) Ágnes Szatmári	1–6, 6–2, [5–10]
Win	9–8	Jul 2010	ITF Valladolid, Spain	25k	Hard	(United Kingdom) Anna Smith	(Spain) Yera Campos Molina (Spain) Leticia Costas	6–3, 2–6, [10–7]
Loss	9–9	Sep 2010	Telavi Open, Georgia	25k	Clay	(Georgia (country)) Oksana Kalashnikova	(Ukraine) Veronika Kapshay (Romania) Ágnes Szatmári	1–6, 6–2, [8–10]
Win	10–9	Oct 2010	Lagos Open, Nigeria	25k	Hard	(Poland) Karolina Kosińska	(Russia) Nina Bratchikova (Romania) Ágnes Szatmári	3–6, 7–5, [10–7]
Loss	10–10	Jun 2011	ITF Kharkiv, Ukraine	25k	Clay	(Lithuania) Lina Stančiūtė	(Ukraine) Valentyna Ivakhnenko (Ukraine) Kateryna Kozlova	4–6, 3–6
Win	11–10	Oct 2011	Lagos Open, Nigeria	25k	Hard	(Russia) Nina Bratchikova	(Slovenia) Tadeja Majerič (Bulgaria) Aleksandrina Naydenova	7–5, 5–7, [10–6]
Win	12–10	Oct 2011	Lagos Open, Nigeria	25k	Hard	(Romania) Ágnes Szatmári	(Montenegro) Danka Kovinić (Ukraine) Elina Svitolina	6–0, 6–7^{(1)}, [10–5]
Win	13–10	Mar 2012	ITF Bangalore, India	25k	Hard	(Belgium) Tamaryn Hendler	(Slovenia) Tadeja Majerič (Slovenia) Anja Prislan	6–2, 4–6, [10–6]
Win	14–10	Aug 2012	Bursa Cup, Turkey	10k	Clay	(Romania) Laura Ioana Paar	(Japan) Erika Takao (Japan) Remi Tezuka	6–2, 6–2
Loss	14–11	Jan 2013	ITF Sharm El Sheikh, Egypt	10k	Hard	(Turkey) Melis Sezer	(Belarus) Lidziya Marozava (Russia) Eugeniya Pashkova	3–6, 1–6
Loss	14–12	Aug 2014	ITF Bogotá, Colombia	100k	Clay	(Austria) Patricia Mayr-Achleitner	(Spain) Lara Arruabarrena (Argentina) Florencia Molinero	2–6, 0–6
Win	15–12	Jan 2015	ITF Sharm El Sheikh	10k	Hard	(Latvia) Anastasija Sevastova	(Norway) Caroline Rohde-Moe (Japan) Midori Yamamoto	6–4, 6–4
Loss	15–13	Feb 2015	ITF Sharm El Sheikh	10k	Hard	(Ukraine) Veronika Kapshay	(Russia) Anna Morgina (Japan) Yuuki Tanaka	6–4, 4–6, [6–10]
Loss	15–14	Nov 2015	ITF Casablanca, Morocco	10k	Clay	(Russia) Anna Morgina	(Spain) Olga Parres Azcoitia (Italy) Camilla Rosatello	2–6, ret.
Win	16–14	Apr 2016	ITF Sharm El Sheikh, Egypt	10k	Hard	(Germany) Julia Wachaczyk	(United Kingdom) Katie Boulter (Ukraine) Oleksandra Korashvili	6–4, 2–6, [13–11]
Win	17–14	Oct 2016	ITF Sharm El Sheikh	10k	Hard	(Romania) Ana Bianca Mihăilă	(Egypt) Ola Abou Zekry (Russia) Anastasia Pribylova	6–4, 6–2
Win	18–14	Mar 2017	ITF Sharm El Sheikh	15k	Hard	(Romania) Laura Ioana Paar	(Denmark) Emilie Francati (Sweden) Kajsa Rinaldo Persson	6–4, 7–5
Loss	18–15	Apr 2017	ITF Sharm El Sheikh	15k	Hard	(Romania) Laura Ioana Paar	(Montenegro) Ana Veselinović (China) You Xiaodi	6–2, 5–7, [11–13]
Loss	18–16	Dec 2017	ITF Cairo, Egypt	15k	Clay	(Australia) Jelena Stojanovic	(Japan) Rio Kitagawa (Slovenia) Nastja Kolar	6–1, 4–6, [2–10]
Loss	18–17	Dec 2017	ITF Cairo, Egypt	15k	Clay	(Australia) Jelena Stojanovic	(Romania) Andreea Roșca (Romania) Gabriela Nicole Tătăruș	1–6, 3–6
Loss	18–18	Mar 2018	ITF Hammamet, Tunisia	15k	Clay	(Romania) Oana Georgeta Simion	(Romania) Oana Gavrilă (Brazil) Laura Pigossi	5–7, 7–6^{(6)}, [9–11]
Win	19–18	Apr 2018	ITF Sharm El Sheikh, Egypt	15k	Hard	(Russia) Anna Morgina	(United Kingdom) Alicia Barnett (Bulgaria) Julia Terziyska	7–5, 6–1
Win	20–18	Jan 2019	ITF Sharm El Sheikh	W15	Hard	(Belgium) Magali Kempen	(Sweden) Jacqueline Cabaj Awad (Switzerland) Fiona Ganz	6–4, 6–1
Win	21–18	Mar 2019	ITF Sharm El Sheikh	W15	Hard	(Germany) Julia Wachaczyk	(Netherlands) Merel Hoedt (Netherlands) Noa Liauw a Fong	6–2, 6–2
Win	22–18	Apr 2019	ITF Cairo, Egypt	W15	Clay	(Greece) Despina Papamichail	(Brazil) Júlia Camargo Silva (Ukraine) Katya Malikova	6–3, 6–1
Win	23–18	Jul 2019	ITF Baja, Hungary	W25	Clay	(Egypt) Mayar Sherif	(Hungary) Réka Luca Jani (Belgium) Lara Salden	6–2, 4–6, [10–8]
Win	24–18	Dec 2021	ITF Cairo, Egypt	W15	Clay	(Russia) Anastasia Zolotareva	(Ukraine) Viktoriya Petrenko (Russia) Anna Ureke	2–6, 6–3, [10–2]
Win	25–18	Jan 2022	ITF Cairo, Egypt	W25	Clay	(Austria) Sinja Kraus	(Hungary) Adrienn Nagy (India) Prarthana Thombare	7–5, 6–3
Win	26–18	May 2022	ITF Cairo, Egypt	W15	Clay	(Russia) Anastasia Zolotareva	(France) Océane Babel (Netherlands) Noa Liauw A Fong	6–1, 7–5
Loss	26–19	Sep 2023	ITF Vienna, Austria	W60	Clay	(Austria) Sinja Kraus	(Romania) Irina Bara (Poland) Weronika Falkowska	3–6, 6–2, [11–13]
Loss	26–20	Oct 2023	ITF Heraklion, Greece	W25	Clay	(Austria) Sinja Kraus	(Romania) Ilinca Amariei (Romania) Anca Todoni	0–6, 7–5, [1–10]
