= Ola Abou Zekry =

Egyptian tennis player (born 1987)

Ola Abou Zekry علا محمد طارق السيد أبوذكرى
- Full name: Ola Mohamed Tarek Al Said Abou Zekry
- Country (sports): Egypt
- Residence: Cairo, Egypt
- Born: 20 June 1987 (age 39) Cairo
- Height: 1.57 m (5 ft 2 in)
- Plays: Right-handed (two-handed backhand)
- Prize money: $54,488

Singles
- Career record: 160–175
- Career titles: 2 ITF
- Highest ranking: No. 441 (20 July 2015)

Doubles
- Career record: 145–115
- Career titles: 9 ITF
- Highest ranking: No. 440 (29 February 2016)

Team competitions
- Fed Cup: 7–15

Ola Mohamed Tarek Al Said Abou Zekry (Arabic: علا محمد طارق السيد أبوذكرى; born 20 June 1987) is a former professional tennis player from Egypt. Abou Zekry has career-high WTA rankings of 441 in singles, achieved on 20 July 2015, and 440 doubles, set on 29 February 2016. In her career, she won two singles titles and nine doubles titles on the ITF Circuit.

Playing for the Egypt Fed Cup team, Abou Zekry has a win–loss record of 7–15. He played college tennis for the University of New Mexico.

== ITF Circuit finals ==
=== Singles: 6 (2 titles, 4 runner-ups) ===
Legend $25,000 tournaments $10,000 tournaments	Finals by surface Hard (2–4) Clay (0–0)

Result	No.	Date	Tournament	Surface	Opponent	Score
Loss	1.	1 June 2014	ITF Sharm El Sheikh, Egypt	Hard	(Sweden) Susanne Celik	1–6, 2–6
Win	1.	31 August 2014	ITF Sharm El Sheikh	Hard	(Switzerland) Sara Ottomano	7–6^{(3)}, 6–4
Win	2.	7 June 2015	ITF Sharm El Sheikh	Hard	(Sweden) Jacqueline Cabaj Awad	6–1, 1–6, 6–3
Loss	2.	12 July 2015	ITF Sharm El Sheikh	Hard	(Australia) Astra Sharma	3–6, 6–2, 0–6
Loss	3.	30 August 2015	ITF Sharm El Sheikh	Hard	(Ukraine) Katarina Zavatska	6–2, 2–6, 3–6
Loss	4.	29 May 2016	ITF Sharm El Sheikh	Hard	(France) Theo Gravouil	1–6, 3–6

=== Doubles: 32 (9 titles, 23 runner-ups) ===
Legend $15,000 tournaments $10,000 tournaments	Finals by surface Hard (7–17) Clay (2–6)

Result	No.	Date	Tournament	Surface	Partner	Opponents	Score
Loss	1.	15 September 2013	ITF Sharm El Sheikh, Egypt	Hard	(China) Gai Ao	(Italy) Giulia Bruzzone (Russia) Alina Mikheeva	6–4, 4–6, [4–10]
Win	1.	20 October 2013	ITF Sharm El Sheikh	Hard	(Brazil) Karina Venditti	(France) Pauline Payet (Russia) Liudmila Vasilyeva	6–4, 6–4
Loss	2.	31 March 2014	ITF Sharm El Sheikh	Hard	(Egypt) Mayar Sherif	(Croatia) Jana Fett (Ukraine) Oleksandra Korashvili	4–6, 5–7
Loss	3.	23 June 2014	ITF Sharm El Sheikh	Hard	(United States) Jan Abaza	(Belgium) Magali Kempen (Russia) Anna Morgina	4–6, 6–3, [2–10]
Win	2.	30 June 2014	ITF Sharm El Sheikh	Hard	(United States) Jan Abaza	(Greece) Eleni Kordolaimi (Greece) Despoina Vogasari	6–4, 3–6, [10–7]
Loss	4.	26 October 2014	ITF Sharm El Sheikh	Hard	(Russia) Ekaterina Yashina	(Ukraine) Diana Bogoliy (Russia) Polina Leykina	3–6, 1–6
Win	3.	21 March 2015	ITF Sharm El Sheikh	Hard	(Ukraine) Kateryna Sliusar	(United Kingdom) Aimee Gibson (United Kingdom) Katie Swan	6–2, 6–4
Loss	5.	4 May 2015	ITF Sharm El Sheikh	Hard	(Ukraine) Anastasia Kharchenko	(Belgium) Britt Geukens (India) Dhruthi Tatachar Venugopal	2–6, 6–7
Loss	6.	17 May 2015	ITF Sharm El Sheikh	Hard	(Bulgaria) Julia Terziyska	(Romania) Elena-Teodora Cadar (Ukraine) Anastasia Kharchenko	2–6, 3–6
Loss	7.	22 June 2015	ITF Sharm El Sheikh	Hard	(Greece) Eleni Kordolaimi	(India) Prarthana Thombare (Netherlands) Eva Wacanno	4–6, 6–7^{(5)}
Loss	8.	5 July 2015	ITF Sharm El Sheikh	Hard	(Greece) Eleni Kordolaimi	(Germany) Luisa Marie Huber (Germany) Amelie Intert	2–6, 6–2, [7–10]
Win	4.	12 July 2015	ITF Sharm El Sheikh	Hard	(India) Shweta Rana	(Russia) Varvara Kuznetsova (Ukraine) Katya Malikova	6–3, 4–6, [10–7]
Loss	9.	5 October 2015	ITF Sharm El Sheikh	Hard	(Montenegro) Ana Veselinović	(United Kingdom) Freya Christie (United States) Alexandra Riley	6–7^{(9)}, 6–3, [8–10]
Loss	10.	29 November 2015	ITF Cairo, Egypt	Clay	(Romania) Ana Bianca Mihăilă	(Egypt) Sandra Samir (Hungary) Naomi Totka	5–7, 7–6^{(7)}, [11–13]
Loss	11.	16 January 2016	ITF Cairo	Clay	(Greece) Despina Papamichail	(Czech Republic) Petra Krejsová (Slovakia) Chantal Škamlová	4–6, 0–6
Loss	12.	31 January 2016	ITF Cairo	Clay	(Greece) Despina Papamichail	(Czech Republic) Petra Krejsová (Slovakia) Chantal Škamlová	6–7^{(2)}, 3–6
Loss	13.	7 February 2016	ITF Sharm El Sheikh	Hard	(Kazakhstan) Kamila Kerimbayeva	(Germany) Nora Niedmers (Germany) Julia Wachaczyk	2–6, 2–6
Loss	14.	28 March 2016	ITF Hammamet, Tunisia	Clay	(India) Snehadevi Reddy	(Germany) Katharina Hobgarski (Romania) Elena Gabriela Ruse	4–6, 4–6
Loss	15.	24 April 2016	ITF Sharm El Sheikh	Hard	(Greece) Despina Papamichail	(Russia) Anastasia Pribylova (Hungary) Naomi Totka	1–6, 6–3, [12–14]
Loss	16.	30 April 2016	ITF Sharm El Sheikh	Hard	(Romania) Jaqueline Cristian	(United Kingdom) Samantha Murray (Greece) Despina Papamichail	3–6, 2–6
Win	5.	29 May 2016	ITF Sharm El Sheikh	Hard	(Ukraine) Kateryna Slıusar	(Greece) Eleni Kordolaimi (India) Eetee Maheta	6–2, 6–2
Win	6.	3 July 2016	ITF Sharm El Sheikh	Hard	(India) Sharmada Balu	(Greece) Eleni Kordolaimi (Romania) Ana Bianca Mihăilă	2–6, 6–3, [10–5]
Loss	17.	24 July 2016	ITF Sharm El Sheikh	Hard	(India) Dhruthi Tatachar Venugopal	(Switzerland) Karin Kennel (France) Victoria Muntean	6–7^{(4)}, 6–2, [4–10]
Loss	18.	31 July 2016	ITF Sharm El Sheikh	Hard	(Ukraine) Kateryna Slıusar	(Greece) Eleni Kordolaimi (India) Shweta Chandra Rana	6–4, 5–7, [5–10]
Win	7.	2 October 2016	ITF Sharm El Sheikh	Hard	(India) Zeel Desai	(United Kingdom) Suzy Larkin (Malaysia) Theiviya Selvarajoo	7–5, 6–4
Loss	19.	30 October 2016	ITF Sharm El Sheikh	Hard	(Russia) Anastasia Pribylova	(Austria) Melanie Klaffner (Romania) Ana Bianca Mihăilă	4–6, 2–6
Loss	20.	5 December 2016	ITF Solapur, India	Hard	(Russia) Anastasia Pribylova	(Russia) Anastasia Gasanova (Belarus) Sviatlana Pirazhenka	4–6, 5–7
Loss	21.	9 April 2017	ITF Sharm El Sheikh	Hard	(Egypt) Sandra Samir	(Montenegro) Ana Veselinović (China) You Xiaodi	3–6, 5–7
Win	8.	25 September 2017	ITF Jounieh, Lebanon	Clay	(Turkey) Berfu Cengiz	(Sweden) Jacqueline Cabaj Awad (Sweden) Fanny Östlund	6–4, 7–5
Win	9.	28 October 2017	ITF Sharm El Sheikh	Clay	(Sweden) Linnéa Malmqvist	(Romania) Elena-Teodora Cadar (Slovenia) Nastja Kolar	5–7, 6–3, [10–3]
Loss	22.	12 May 2018	ITF Cairo, Egypt	Clay	(Egypt) Sandra Samir	(Egypt) Lamis Alhussein Abdel Aziz (Canada) Maria Patrascu	6–4, 3–6, [9–11]
Loss	23.	15 July 2018	ITF Prokuplje, Serbia	Clay	(Poland) Joanna Zawadzka	(Serbia) Barbara Bonić (Australia) Jelena Stojanovic	2–6, 1–6
