= Anna Morgina =

Ruskayansuka

Anna Morgina Анна Моргина
- Country (sports): Russia
- Born: 21 August 1991 (age 34) Moscow, Soviet Union
- Height: 1.70 m (5 ft 7 in)
- Plays: Right (two-handed backhand)
- Prize money: $151,013

Singles
- Career record: 347–226
- Career titles: 13 ITF
- Highest ranking: No. 316 (2 October 2017)

Doubles
- Career record: 329–172
- Career titles: 39 ITF
- Highest ranking: No. 165 (14 November 2016)

Anna Alexandrovna Morgina (Russian: Анна Александровна Моргина; born 21 August 1991) is a Russian tennis player.

Morgina has career-high WTA rankings of 316 in singles, achieved on 2 October 2017, and 165 in doubles, set on 14 November 2016. Over her career, she won 13 singles titles and 39 doubles titles on the ITF Women's Circuit.

Morgina made her main-draw debut on the WTA Tour in the doubles event of the 2015 Baku Cup, partnering with Valentyna Ivakhnenko.

== ITF Circuit finals ==
=== Singles: 28 (13 titles, 15 runner–ups) ===
Legend $100,000 tournaments $75,000 tournaments $25,000 tournaments $15,000 tournaments $10,000 tournaments	Finals by surface Hard (12–13) Clay (1–2)

Result	W–L	Date	Tournament	Tier	Surface	Opponent	Score
Loss	0–1	Jul 2010	ITF Casablanca, Morocco	10,000	Clay	(Tunisia) Ons Jabeur	5–7, 3–6
Loss	0–2	Dec 2011	ITF Djibouti City	10,000	Hard	(Russia) Alexandra Romanova	3–6, 4–6
Loss	0–3	Jun 2012	ITF Sharm El Sheikh, Egypt	10,000	Hard	(Kazakhstan) Zalina Khairudinova	7–5, 2–6, 5–7
Win	1–3	Jun 2012	ITF Sharm El Sheikh	10,000	Hard	(Kazakhstan) Kamila Kerimbayeva	6–3, 6–1
Win	2–3	Jul 2013	ITF Sharm El Sheikh	10,000	Hard	(Italy) Valeria Prosperi	6–4, 6–3
Win	3–3	Jul 2013	ITF Sharm El Sheikh	10,000	Hard	(France) Pauline Payet	6–1, 6–3
Win	4–3	Jul 2013	ITF Sharm El Sheikh	10,000	Hard	(Germany) Linda Prenkovic	6–3, 6–2
Win	5–3	Aug 2013	ITF Sharm El Sheikh	10,000	Hard	(Sweden) Susanne Celik	6–3, 1–6, 7–6^{(2)}
Loss	5–4	Sep 2013	ITF Sharm El Sheikh	10,000	Hard	(Oman) Fatma Al-Nabhani	4–6, 1–6
Win	6–4	Oct 2013	ITF Sharm El Sheikh	10,000	Hard	(Turkey) İpek Soylu	6–3, 3–6, 7–5
Loss	6–5	Jun 2014	ITF Sharm El Sheikh	10,000	Hard	(Romania) Elena-Teodora Cadar	4–6, 4–6
Loss	6–6	Jun 2014	ITF Sharm El Sheikh	10,000	Hard	(Greece) Despina Papamichail	1–6, 3–6
Win	7–6	Sep 2014	ITF Sharm El Sheikh	10,000	Hard	(Serbia) Vojislava Lukić	6–7^{(2)}, 6–4, 6–3
Loss	7–7	Sep 2014	ITF Sharm El Sheikh	10,000	Hard	(Serbia) Vojislava Lukić	4–6, 3–6
Win	8–7	Sep 2014	ITF Sharm El Sheikh	10,000	Hard	(India) Sri Peddi Reddy	7–5, 6–2
Loss	8–8	Apr 2015	ITF Cairo, Egypt	10,000	Clay	(Hungary) Naomi Totka	2–6, 4–6
Win	9–8	Mar 2016	ITF Sharm El Sheikh	10,000	Hard	(Czech Republic) Karolína Muchová	1–6, 6–0, 6–3
Loss	9–9	May 2016	ITF Sharm El Sheikh	10,000	Hard	(Australia) Sara Tomic	4–6, 1–6
Win	10–9	Oct 2016	ITF Sharm El Sheikh	10,000	Hard	(Bosnia and Herzegovina) Dea Herdželaš	6–4, 6–0
Loss	10–10	Oct 2016	ITF Sharm El Sheikh	10,000	Hard	(Bosnia and Herzegovina) Dea Herdželaš	1–6, 6–7^{(5)}
Loss	10–11	May 2017	RWB Ladies Cup, Russia	25,000	Hard (i)	(Serbia) Dejana Radanović	3–6, 3–6
Loss	10–12	Oct 2018	ITF Sharm El Sheikh, Egypt	15,000	Hard	(Romania) Elena-Teodora Cadar	4–6, 6–3, 0–6
Win	11–12	Nov 2018	ITF Sharm El Sheikh	15,000	Hard	(Switzerland) Sandy Marti	6–2, 6–7^{(6)}, 6–1
Loss	11–13	Nov 2018	ITF Sharm El Sheikh	15,000	Hard	(Ukraine) Anastasiya Shoshyna	5–7, 5–7
Win	12–13	Feb 2019	ITF Sharm El Sheikh	15,000	Hard	(Brazil) Laura Pigossi	6–3, 6–2
Loss	12–14	Aug 2019	ITF Cancún, Mexico	15,000	Hard	(Brazil) Thaisa Grana Pedretti	4–6, 0–2 ret.
Win	13–14	Aug 2019	ITF Lambaré, Paraguay	15,000	Clay	(Chile) Fernanda Brito	3–6, 6–2, 6–2
Loss	13–15	Nov 2019	ITF Sharm El Sheikh	15,000	Hard	(Chinese Taipei) Lee Pei-chi	2–6, 4–6

=== Doubles: 67 (39 titles, 28 runner–ups) ===
Result	No.	Date	Location	Surface	Partner	Opponents	Score
Loss	1.	11 May 2009	ITF Ain Sukhna, Egypt	Clay	(Russia) Galina Fokina	(Egypt) Yasmin Ebada (Spain) Laura Pous Tió	4–6, 6–2, [5–10]
Loss	2.	18 May 2009	ITF Ain Sukhna, Egypt	Clay	(Russia) Galina Fokina	(Sweden) Anna Brazhnikova (Russia) Valeria Savinykh	6–3, 3–6, [6–10]
Win	1.	20 June 2009	ITF İstanbul, Turkey	Hard	(Russia) Galina Fokina	(Turkey) Çağla Büyükakçay (Turkey) Pemra Özgen	6–4, 4–6, [10–8]
Win	2.	17 July 2009	ITF Casablanca, Morocco	Clay	(Russia) Galina Fokina	(Italy) Benedetta Davato (Switzerland) Lisa Sabino	7–6^{(5)}, 0–6, [10–6]
Loss	3.	22 July 2010	ITF Casablanca, Morocco	Clay	(Russia) Galina Fokina	(Slovakia) Katarína Baranová (Tunisia) Ons Jabeur	3–6, 3–6
Win	3.	15 July 2011	ITF Tanger, Morocco	Clay	(Morocco) Fatima El Allami	(Italy) Anna Agamennone (Italy) Linda Mair	3–6, 6–4, [10–6]
Loss	4.	16 December 2011	ITF Djibouti City	Hard	(Russia) Diana Isaeva	(Russia) Alexandra Romanova (India) Poojashree Venkatesha	1–6, 0–6
Win	4.	7 July 2012	ITF Sharm El Sheikh, Egypt	Hard	(Hong Kong) Venise Chan	(Egypt) Magy Aziz (Egypt) Mora Eshak	6–1, 6–2
Win	5.	4 May 2013	ITF Sharm El Sheikh	Hard	(Russia) Yana Sizikova	(Belgium) Lise Brulmans (Belgium) Klaartje Liebens	6–3, 6–2
Loss	5.	11 May 2013	ITF Sharm El Sheikh	Hard	(Ukraine) Anastasia Kharchenko	(Italy) Carolina Petrelli (Montenegro) Ana Veselinović	6–3, 5–7, [7–10]
Win	6.	15 June 2013	ITF Sharm El Sheikh	Hard	(India) Sowjanya Bavisetti	(Slovenia) Dalila Jakupović (India) Kyra Shroff	6–1, 3–6, [10–6]
Loss	6.	13 July 2013	ITF Sharm El Sheikh	Hard	(Hungary) Naomi Totka	(United States) Kristi Boxx (New Zealand) Abigail Guthrie	1–6, 2–6
Loss	7.	20 July 2013	ITF Sharm El Sheikh	Hard	(Russia) Alina Mikheeva	(South Africa) Lynn Kiro (Egypt) Mayar Sherif	3–6, 2–6
Win	7.	31 August 2013	ITF Sharm El Sheikh	Hard	(Russia) Yana Sizikova	(Czech Republic) Nikola Horáková (Russia) Julia Valetova	6–2, 6–4
Win	8.	7 September 2013	ITF Sharm El Sheikh	Hard	(Russia) Yana Sizikova	(Oman) Fatma Al-Nabhani (Russia) Alina Mikheeva	6–7^{(4)}, 6–1, [10–8]
Win	9.	5 October 2013	ITF Sharm El Sheikh	Hard	(Russia) Yana Sizikova	(Italy) Giulia Bruzzone (Brazil) Karina Venditti	6–2, 6–3
Win	10.	12 October 2013	ITF Sharm El Sheikh	Hard	(Russia) Yana Sizikova	(India) Natasha Palha (Brazil) Karina Venditti	6–3, 6–2
Loss	8.	23 November 2013	Soho Square Tournament, Egypt	Clay	(Czech Republic) Kateřina Siniaková	(Switzerland) Timea Bacsinszky (Germany) Kristina Barrois	7–6^{(5)}, 0–6, [4–10]
Win	11.	19 April 2014	ITF Sharm El Sheikh	Hard	(United Kingdom) Katy Dunne	(China) Dong Xiaorong (Austria) Pia König	7–5, 7–6^{(5)}
Win	12.	24 May 2014	ITF Sharm El Sheikh	Hard	(Romania) Elena-Teodora Cadar	(China) Diana Bogoliy (India) Nidhi Chilumula	3–6, 6–2, [10–5]
Win	13.	14 June 2014	ITF Sharm El Sheikh	Hard	(Norway) Caroline Rohde-Moe	(Romania) Elena-Teodora Cadar (Spain) Arabela Fernández Rabener	6–3, 7–5
Win	14.	28 June 2014	ITF Sharm El Sheikh	Hard	(Belgium) Magali Kempen	(United States) Jan Abaza (Egypt) Ola Abou Zekry	6–4, 3–6, [10–2]
Win	15.	16 August 2014	ITF Sharm El Sheikh	Hard	(United Kingdom) Harriet Dart	(Australia) Abbie Myers (Australia) Georgiana Ruhrig	6–2, 6–1
Win	16.	30 August 2014	ITF Sharm El Sheikh	Hard	(South Africa) Michelle Sammons	(Italy) Giulia Bruzzone (India) Rishika Sunkara	6–2, 6–1
Win	17.	13 September 2014	ITF Sharm El Sheikh	Hard	(Russia) Yana Sizikova	(South Africa) Ilze Hattingh (South Africa) Michelle Sammons	6–3, 0–6, [10–6]
Loss	9.	20 September 2014	ITF Sharm El Sheikh	Hard	(Russia) Yana Sizikova	(India) Arantxa Andrady (South Africa) Ilze Hattingh	6–7^{(6)}, 2–6
Win	18.	22 November 2014	ITF Sharm El Sheikh	Hard	(Serbia) Nina Stojanović	(Russia) Alina Mikheeva (Czech Republic) Martina Přádová	5–7, 6–1, [10–3]
Win	19.	29 November 2014	ITF Sharm El Sheikh	Hard	(Russia) Anastasia Pribylova	(India) Snehadevi Reddy (India) Dhruthi Tatachar Venugopal	6–4, 6–4
Loss	10.	6 December 2014	ITF Sharm El Sheikh	Hard	(Russia) Anastasia Pribylova	(Czech Republic) Nikola Fraňková (Italy) Claudia Giovine	6–7^{(1)}, 6–4, [6–10]
Win	20.	26 December 2014	ITF Pune, India	Hard	(Serbia) Nina Stojanović	(Georgia (country)) Oksana Kalashnikova (Ukraine) Anastasiya Vasylyeva	7–6^{(7)}, 6–4
Win	21.	7 February 2015	ITF Sharm El Sheikh	Hard	(Japan) Yuuki Tanaka	(Ukraine) Veronika Kapshay (Austria) Melanie Klaffner	4–6, 6–4, [10–6]
Win	22.	21 February 2015	ITF Sharm El Sheikh	Hard	(Bulgaria) Julia Terziyska	(Belarus) Darya Lebesheva (Russia) Anastasia Shaulskaya	6–3, 6–0
Win	23.	28 February 2015	ITF Sharm El Sheikh	Hard	(Bulgaria) Julia Terziyska	(Turkey) Ayla Aksu (Turkey) Müge Topsel	6–1, 4–6, [10–2]
Loss	11.	7 March 2015	ITF Sharm El Sheikh	Hard	(Norway) Caroline Rohde-Moe	(Czech Republic) Markéta Vondroušová (Belarus) Vera Lapko	2–6, 4–6
Loss	12.	28 March 2015	ITF Sharm El Sheikh	Hard	(Bulgaria) Julia Terziyska	(Spain) Arabela Fernández Rabener (North Macedonia) Lina Gjorcheska	3–6, 6–7^{(4)}
Loss	13.	17 October 2015	ITF Sharm El Sheikh	Hard	(Republic of Ireland) Jennifer Claffey	(Romania) Karola Bejenaru (United Kingdom) Freya Christie	3–6, 2–6
Loss	14.	24 October 2015	ITF Sharm El Sheikh	Hard	(Chinese Taipei) Hsu Chieh-yu	(United Kingdom) Emily Arbuthnott (United Kingdom) Lisa Whybourn	2–6, 4–6
Loss	15.	13 November 2015	ITF Casablanca, Morocco	Clay	(Austria) Melanie Klaffner	(Spain) Olga Parres Azcoitia (Italy) Camilla Rosatello	2–6, ret.
Loss	16.	6 December 2015	ITF Cairo, Egypt	Clay	(Poland) Patrycja Polańska	(Austria) Julia Grabher (Romania) Ana Bianca Mihăilă	2–6, 4–6
Win	24.	18 December 2015	ITF Navi Mumbai, India	Hard	(Serbia) Nina Stojanović	(Russia) Polina Leykina (China) Lu Jiajing	6–3, 7–5
Loss	17.	5 March 2016	ITF Sharm El Sheikh	Hard	(Russia) Anastasiya Komardina	(Ukraine) Alona Fomina (Russia) Ekaterina Yashina	1–6, 6–4, [8–10]
Loss	18.	12 March 2016	ITF Sharm El Sheikh	Hard	(Russia) Anastasiya Komardina	(Ukraine) Alona Fomina (Russia) Ekaterina Yashina	6–7^{(2)}, 6–3, [8–10]
Win	25.	14 May 2016	ITF Sharm El Sheikh	Hard	(Australia) Sara Tomic	(Greece) Eleni Kordolaimi (Sweden) Anette Munozova	6–3, 6–2
Loss	19.	20 June 2016	ITF Moscow, Russia	Clay	(Ukraine) Ganna Poznikhirenko	(Russia) Natela Dzalamidze (Russia) Veronika Kudermetova	1–6, 2–6
Loss	20.	3 July 2016	ITF Helsingborg, Sweden	Clay	(Sweden) Cornelia Lister	(China) Tian Ran (China) You Xiaodi	4–6, 3–6
Win	26.	23 September 2016	Neva Cup, Russia	Hard (i)	(Russia) Maria Marfutina	(Romania) Raluca Olaru (Russia) Alena Tarasova	6–2, 6–3
Loss	21.	8 October 2016	ITF Sharm El Sheikh, Egypt	Hard	(Ukraine) Alona Fomina	(Sweden) Jacqueline Cabaj Awad (Romania) Jaqueline Cristian	3–6, 5–7
Win	27.	25 March 2017	ITF Sharm El Sheikh	Hard	(Slovakia) Tereza Mihalíková	(China) Li Yuenu (China) Meng Ran	2–6, 6–4, [10–5]
Win	28.	1 July 2017	Bella Cup, Poland	Clay	(Belarus) Vera Lapko	(Czech Republic) Miriam Kolodziejová (Czech Republic) Jesika Malečková	6–2, 6–3
Win	29.	17 February 2018	ITF Sharm El Sheikh, Egypt	Hard	(Russia) Valeriya Solovyeva	(Germany) Constanze Stepan (Poland) Iga Świątek	6–4, 6–2
Win	30.	21 April 2018	ITF Sharm El Sheikh	Hard	(Austria) Melanie Klaffner	(United Kingdom) Alicia Barnett (Bulgaria) Julia Terziyska	7–5, 6–1
Loss	22.	8 June 2018	ITF Namangan, Uzbekistan	Hard	(Bulgaria) Julia Terziyska	(Russia) Anastasia Gasanova (Russia) Ekaterina Yashina	3–6, 1–6
Win	31.	17 August 2018	ITF Moscow, Russia	Clay	(Russia) Anastasia Frolova	(Russia) Anastasia Kharitonova (Russia) Daria Nazarkina	6–3, 6–4
Loss	23.	24 August 2018	ITF Moscow, Russia	Clay	(Russia) Anastasia Frolova	(Russia) Vlada Koval (Moldova) Vitalia Stamat	6–7^{(5)}, 7–5, [6–10]
Win	32.	15 September 2018	ITF Cairo, Egypt	Clay	(Russia) Elina Nepliy	(Romania) Gabriela Nicole Tătăruș (Belgium) Chelsea Vanhoutte	7–5, 6–1
Win	33.	27 October 2018	ITF Sharm El Sheikh, Egypt	Hard	(Australia) Jelena Stojanovic	(Russia) Ulyana Ayzatulina (Romania) Elena-Teodora Cadar	6–3, 6–3
Win	34.	10 November 2018	ITF Sharm El Sheikh	Hard	(Ukraine) Anastasiya Shoshyna	(Romania) Elena-Teodora Cadar (Bosnia and Herzegovina) Jelena Simić	3–6, 6–3, [10–5]
Win	35.	16 February 2019	ITF Sharm El Sheikh	Hard	(Brazil) Laura Pigossi	(Belarus) Nika Shytkouskaya (Russia) Anastasia Sukhotina	6–2, 6–2
Loss	24.	28 April 2019	ITF Pula, Italy	Clay	(Russia) Victoria Kan	(France) Manon Arcangioli (France) Elixane Lechemia	w/o
Loss	25.	15 June 2019	ITF Přerov, Czech Republic	Clay	(Czech Republic) Kateřina Mandlíková	(Czech Republic) Karolína Kubáňová (Czech Republic) Nikola Tomanová	4–6, 6–7^{(2)}
Loss	26.	11 August 2019	ITF Santa Cruz, Bolivia	Clay	(Russia) Elizaveta Koklina	(Argentina) Jazmín Ortenzi (Bolivia) Noelia Zeballos	1–6, 6–4, [9–11]
Win	36.	20 September 2019	ITF Melilla, Spain	Clay	(Russia) Daria Mishina	(Spain) Ángela Fita Boluda (Spain) Olga Parres Azcoitia	6–1, 6–7^{(2)}, [10–6]
Win	37.	17 November 2019	ITF Minsk, Belarus	Hard (i)	(Russia) Victoria Kan	(Russia) Anastasia Pribylova (Netherlands) Suzan Lamens	6–1, 6–7^{(2)}, [10–6]
Loss	27.	14 December 2019	ITF Pune, India	Hard	(Russia) Daria Mishina	(Russia) Ekaterina Yashina (Norway) Ulrikke Eikeri	6–1, 3–6, [5–10]
Loss	28.	2 February 2020	ITF Cairo, Egypt	Hard	(Russia) Anastasia Zolotareva	(Serbia) Tamara Čurović (Serbia) Elena Milovanović	2–6, 6–2, [2–10]
Win	38.	12 June 2021	ITF Vilnius, Lithuania	Hard (i)	(Russia) Ekaterina Makarova	(Lithuania) Justina Mikulskytė (Lithuania) Akvilė Paražinskaitė	6–2, 3–6, [10–2]
Win	39.	24 July 2021	ITF Moscow, Russia	Clay	(Russia) Daria Mishina	(Uzbekistan) Nigina Abduraimova (Russia) Angelina Gabueva	7–5, 2–6, [11–9]
