= Victoria Kan =

Russian tennis player (born 1995)

Victoria Kan Виктория Кан
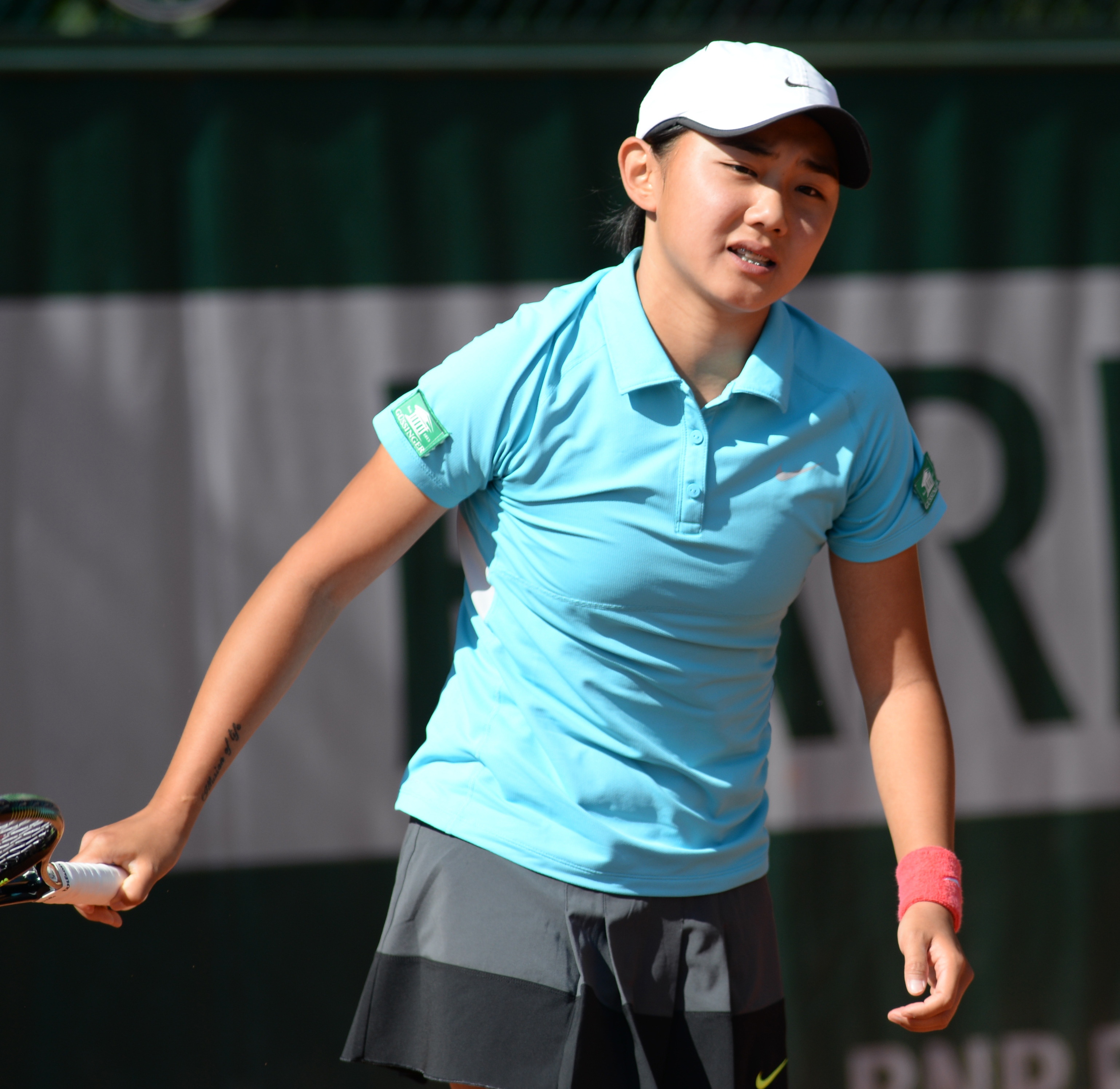
- Kan at the 2015 French Open
- Full name: Victoria Rodionovna Kan
- Country (sports): Russia
- Born: 3 August 1995 (age 31) Tashkent, Uzbekistan
- Prize money: $226,058

Singles
- Career record: 372–163
- Career titles: 24 ITF
- Highest ranking: No. 151 (31 March 2014)

Grand Slam singles results
- Australian Open: Q1 (2021)
- French Open: Q2 (2015)

Doubles
- Career record: 113–58
- Career titles: 14 ITF
- Highest ranking: No. 359 (27 July 2015)
Medal record
tennis
Representing RUS
Summer Universiade
Bronze medal – third place	2019 Naples	Team

Victoria Rodionovna Kan (Russian: Виктория Родионовна Кан; born 3 August 1995) is a Russian tennis player. On 31 March 2014, she achieved her career-high singles ranking of world No. 151. On 27 July 2015, she peaked at No. 359 in the WTA doubles rankings. In 2011, she reached the girls' doubles final of the French Open.

Kan has won 24 singles and 14 doubles titles on the ITF Women's Circuit. In November 2013, she won the inaugural Soho Square Ladies Tournament in Sharm El Sheikh, a $75k+H event, by defeating Nastja Kolar in the final, in straight sets.

Playing for Russia Fed Cup team, she made her debut in February 2014, losing to Australia's Samantha Stosur in straight sets in their World Group first-round tie. This was her single appearance in Fed Cup competition.

== Junior Grand Slam finals ==
=== Girls' doubles: 1 (runner–up) ===
Result	Year	Tournament	Surface	Partner	Opponents	Score
Loss	2011	French Open	Clay	(Netherlands) Demi Schuurs	(Russia) Irina Khromacheva (Belgium) Maryna Zanevska	4–6, 5–7

== ITF Circuit finals ==
=== Singles: 32 (24 titles, 8 runner-ups) ===
Legend $75,000 tournaments $50,000 tournaments $25,000 tournaments $10/15,000 tournaments	Finals by surface Hard (1–1) Clay (21–7) Carpet (1–0)

Result	W–L	Date	Tournament	Tier	Surface	Opponent	Score
Win	1–0	Jul 2011	ITF Bad Waltersdorf, Austria	10k	Clay	(Czech Republic) Kateřina Vaňková	7–6^{(3)}, 6–1
Win	2–0	Aug 2011	ITF Pörtschach, Austria	10k	Clay	(Czech Republic) Diana Šumová	4–6, 6–2, 6–3
Loss	2–1	Oct 2011	ITF Dubrovnik, Croatia	10k	Clay	(Italy) Martina Caregaro	3–6, 3–6
Win	3–1	Jul 2012	ITF Prokuplje, Serbia	10k	Clay	(Russia) Maria Mokh	6–1, 6–2
Win	4–1	Jul 2012	Palić Open, Serbia	10k	Clay	(Serbia) Doroteja Erić	6–1, 6–4
Win	5–1	Aug 2012	ITF Bursa, Turkey	10k	Clay	(Romania) Laura Ioana Paar	7–6^{(4)}, 6–4
Win	6–1	Oct 2012	ITF Sarajevo, BiH	15k	Clay	(Germany) Dinah Pfizenmaier	4–6, 6–4, 5–2 ret.
Win	7–1	Dec 2012	ITF Antalya, Turkey	10k	Clay	(Ukraine) Anastasiya Vasylyeva	6–3, 7–5
Loss	7–2	Apr 2013	ITF La Marsa, Tunisia	25k	Clay	(Austria) Yvonne Meusberger	3–6, 4–6
Win	8–2	Jul 2013	ITF Imola, Italy	25k	Carpet	(Ukraine) Lyudmyla Kichenok	3–6, 7–5, 6–2
Loss	8–3	Sep 2013	Telavi Open, Georgia	50k	Clay	(Russia) Alexandra Panova	5–7, 1–6
Win	9–3	Oct 2013	ITF Casablanca, Morocco	25k	Clay	(Ukraine) Olga Savchuk	6–4, 6–4
Win	10–3	Nov 2013	Soho Square Tournament, Egypt	75k	Clay	(Slovenia) Nastja Kolar	6–4, 6–4
Loss	10–4	Sep 2014	ITF Sofia, Bulgaria	25k	Clay	(Romania) Andreea Mitu	4–6, 6–4, 3–6
Win	11–4	Feb 2015	ITF Antalya, Turkey	10k	Clay	(Germany) Anne Schäfer	6–3, 6–4
Win	12–4	Mar 2015	ITF Antalya, Turkey	10k	Clay	(Germany) Anne Schäfer	6–1, 6–0
Win	13–4	Sep 2015	ITF Bucha, Ukraine	10k	Clay	(Moldova) Alexandra Perper	4–6, 6–2, 6–0
Win	14–4	Apr 2016	ITF Heraklion, Greece	10k	Hard	(Italy) Cristiana Ferrando	6–4, 7–5
Win	15–4	May 2016	Wiesbaden Open, Germany	25k	Clay	(Germany) Laura Schaeder	6–2, 4–6, 6–0
Win	16–4	May 2016	ITF La Marsa, Tunisia	25k	Clay	(Kazakhstan) Galina Voskoboeva	6–4, 6–4
Loss	16–5	Sep 2017	ITF Cairo, Egypt	15k	Clay	(Spain) Nuria Párrizas Díaz	4–6, 1–6
Win	17–5	Sep 2017	ITF Cairo, Egypt	15k	Clay	(Spain) Nuria Párrizas Díaz	7–5, 6–3
Win	18–5	Nov 2017	ITF Casablanca, Morocco	15k	Clay	(Romania) Oana Georgeta Simion	6–0, 6–3
Win	19–5	Nov 2017	ITF Beni Mellal, Morocco	15k	Clay	(Italy) Federica Arcidiacono	6–3, 6–7^{(1)}, 6–1
Loss	19–6	May 2018	ITF Hammamet, Tunisia	15k	Clay	(Spain) Guiomar Maristany	6–7^{(1)}, 3–6
Win	20–6	Jul 2018	ITF Jablonec nad Nisou, Czech Republic	15k	Clay	(Czech Republic) Magdaléna Pantůčková	6–4, 6–1
Win	21–6	Feb 2019	ITF Antalya, Turkey	W15	Clay	(Romania) Irina Fetecău	6–2, 6–2
Win	22–6	Mar 2019	ITF Antalya, Turkey	W15	Clay	(Italy) Camilla Scala	6–3, 6–2
Win	23–6	Jul 2019	ITF Moscow, Russia	W25	Clay	(Russia) Vlada Koval	6–1, 7–6^{(2)}
Loss	23–7	Apr 2022	ITF Antalya, Turkey	W15	Clay	(Germany) Julia Middendorf	1–6, 1–4 ret.
Loss	23–8	Dec 2022	ITF Oberpullendorf, Austria	W15	Hard (i)	(Croatia) Lucija Ciric Bagaric	3–6, 0–6
Win	24–8	Apr 2025	ITF Antalya, Turkiye	W15	Clay	Valeriya Yushchenko	6–7^{(10)}, 6–3, 6–4

=== Doubles: 23 (14 titles, 9 runner-ups) ===
Result	W–L	Date	Tournament	Tier	Surface	Partner	Opponents	Score
Win	1–0	Aug 2011	ITF Innsbruck, Austria	10k	Clay	(Belarus) Ilona Kremen	(Austria) Patricia Haas (Austria) Veronika Sepp	2–6, 6–3, [10–5]
Win	2–0	Aug 2011	ITF Pörtschach, Austria	10k	Clay	(Belarus) Ilona Kremen	(Austria) Pia König (Austria) Yvonne Neuwirth	6–1, 6–3
Win	3–0	Oct 2011	ITF Dubrovnik, Croatia	10k	Clay	(Czech Republic) Barbora Krejčíková	(Czech Republic) Martina Kubičíková (Bulgaria) Dalia Zafirova	7–6^{(3)}, 6–0
Win	4–0	Jun 2012	ITF Jablonec nad Nisou, Czech Republic	10k	Clay	(Czech Republic) Kateřina Siniaková	(Czech Republic) Martina Borecká (Czech Republic) Petra Krejsová	6–4, 6–3
Win	5–0	Jul 2012	ITF Prokuplje, Serbia	10k	Clay	(Slovakia) Lucia Butkovská	(North Macedonia) Lina Gjorcheska (Bulgaria) Dalia Zafirova	6–0, 2–6, [10–7]
Loss	5–1	Jul 2013	Zubr Cup, Czech Republic	15k	Clay	(Ukraine) Ganna Poznikhirenko	(Czech Republic) Petra Krejsová (Czech Republic) Jesika Malečková	1–6, 6–4, [5–10]
Win	6–1	Aug 2013	ITF St. Petersburg, Russia	25k	Clay	(Ukraine) Ganna Poznikhirenko	(Poland) Justyna Jegiołka (Thailand) Noppawan Lertcheewakarn	6–2, 6–0
Win	7–1	Feb 2015	ITF Antalya, Turkey	10k	Clay	(Georgia (country)) Ekaterine Gorgodze	(Sweden) Cornelia Lister (Ukraine) Alyona Sotnikova	6–1, 6–0
Win	8–1	Mar 2015	ITF Seville, Spain	25k	Clay	(Georgia (country)) Ekaterine Gorgodze	(Austria) Sandra Klemenschits (Germany) Dinah Pfizenmaier	6–3, 6–2
Loss	8–2	Sep 2015	ITF Bucha, Ukraine	10k	Clay	(Ukraine) Olga Ianchuk	(Ukraine) Alona Fomina (Ukraine) Oleksandra Korashvili	4–6, 3–6
Win	9–2	Apr 2016	ITF Heraklion, Greece	10k	Hard	(Ukraine) Alyona Sotnikova	(Uzbekistan) Vlada Ekshibarova (Austria) Janina Toljan	6–1, 6–2
Loss	9–3	May 2016	ITF La Marsa, Tunisia	25k	Clay	(Uzbekistan) Sabina Sharipova	(Russia) Vitalia Diatchenko (Kazakhstan) Galina Voskoboeva	3–6, 6–1, [10–12]
Loss	9–4	May 2016	ITF Andijan, Uzbekistan	25k	Hard	(Uzbekistan) Sabina Sharipova	(Czech Republic) Barbora Štefková (Ukraine) Anastasiya Vasylyeva	3–6, 6–4, [7–10]
Win	10–4	Sep 2017	ITF Cairo, Egypt	15k	Clay	(Russia) Maria Zotova	(Italy) Federica Joe Gardella (Germany) Ina Kaufinger	6–2, 6–0
Win	11–4	Sep 2017	ITF Cairo, Egypt	15k	Clay	(Russia) Maria Zotova	(United States) Akiko Okuda (Dominican Republic) Kelly Williford	6–3, 6–3
Win	12–4	Oct 2017	ITF Jounieh Open, Lebanon	15k	Clay	(Russia) Maria Zotova	(Hungary) Naomi Totka (Serbia) Draginja Vuković	6–0, 6–1
Loss	12–5	Nov 2017	ITF Casablanca, Morocco	15k	Clay	(Russia) Maria Zotova	(Germany) Katharina Hering (Spain) Olga Parres Azcoitia	6–7^{(4)}, 2–6
Loss	12–6	Apr 2018	ITF Pula, Italy	25k	Clay	(Russia) Maria Zotova	(Australia) Naiktha Bains (Netherlands) Rosalie van der Hoek	2–6, 2–6
Win	13–6	Sep 2018	ITF Székesfehérvár, Hungary	15k	Clay	(Slovakia) Ingrid Vojčináková	(Serbia) Tamara Čurović (Serbia) Draginja Vuković	7–5, 6–3
Loss	13–7	Apr 2019	ITF Pula, Italy	W25	Clay	(Russia) Anna Morgina	(France) Manon Arcangioli (France) Elixane Lechemia	w/o
Win	14–7	Nov 2019	ITF Minsk, Belarus	W25	Hard (i)	(Russia) Anna Morgina	(Netherlands) Suzan Lamens (Russia) Anastasia Pribylova	7–6^{(3)}, 7–6^{(4)}
Loss	14–8	Feb 2020	Trnava Indoor, Slovakia	W25	Hard (i)	(Ukraine) Ganna Poznikhirenko	(Czech Republic) Miriam Kolodziejová (Romania) Laura Ioana Paar	1–6, 1–6
Loss	14–9	Jul 2024	Amstelveen Open, Netherlands	W35	Clay	Ekaterina Makarova	(Netherlands) Michaëlla Krajicek (Netherlands) Eva Vedder	w/o

== Fed Cup participation ==
=== Singles ===
Edition	Stage	Date	Location	Against	Surface	Opponent	W/L	Score
2014	WG 1R	Feb 2014	Hobart, Australia	Australia	Hard	Samantha Stosur	L	2–6, 3–6

Sporting positions
Preceded by (United States) Lauren Herring / (United States) Madison Keys	Orange Bowl Girls' Doubles Champion; 2011; With: (Ukraine) Ganna Poznikhirenko	Succeeded by (United States) Gabrielle Andrews / (United States) Taylor Townsend
