= Nastja Kolar =

Slovenian tennis player

- Country (sports): Slovenia
- Residence: Celje, Slovenia
- Born: 15 July 1994 (age 31) Celje
- Height: 1.76 m (5 ft 9 in)
- Plays: Right (two-handed backhand)
- Prize money: $175,837

Singles
- Career record: 352–208
- Career titles: 10 ITF
- Highest ranking: No. 178 (3 November 2014)

Grand Slam singles results
- US Open: Q1 (2011, 2014)

Doubles
- Career record: 138–115
- Career titles: 16 ITF
- Highest ranking: No. 140 (21 September 2015)

Team competitions
- Fed Cup: 0–7

Nastja Kolar (born 15 July 1994) is a Slovenian former professional tennis player. In her junior career, her highest ranking was fourth. Her highest WTA rankings were 178 in singles and 140 in doubles.

In 2023, Kolar was provisionally suspended from tennis competitions by the International Tennis Integrity Agency (ITIA) on corruption charges, and then later that year she was banned for life from professional tennis and fined $175,000 after the ITIA found her guilty of 25 match fixing offenses.

== Tennis career ==
In July 2009 Kolar played in her first WTA Tour tournament, the Slovenia Open in Portorož, where she lost to Roberta Vinci in the first round. In 2010, she won a $10k tournament in Croatia, her first title on the ITF Women's Circuit. In May 2011, Kolar won her second title at a $25k event in Maribor, Slovenia. In July, she qualified for the Gastein Ladies where she won her first WTA Tour-level match when she defeated Alla Kudryavtseva in straight sets to advance to the second round. Kolar won her biggest title in 2014, winning the doubles title at the $50k 2014 Ankara Cup with Ekaterine Gorgodze.

== ITF Circuit finals ==
Legend
$75,000 tournaments
$50,000 tournaments
$25,000 tournaments
$10/15,000 tournaments

=== Singles: 23 (10 titles, 13 runner-ups) ===
Result	W–L	Date	Tournament	Tier	Surface	Opponent	Score
Win	1–0	Aug 2010	ITF Čakovec, Croatia	10,000	Clay	(Italy) Paola Cigui	7–5, 6–4
Win	2–0	Jun 2011	Maribor Open, Slovenia	25,000	Clay	(Slovenia) Maša Zec Peškirič	7–5, 6–4
Loss	2–1	Aug 2013	ITF Pörtschach, Austria	10,000	Clay	(Italy) Gioia Barbieri	2–6, 3–6
Loss	2–2	Sep 2013	Save Cup Mestre, Italy	50,000	Clay	(France) Claire Feuerstein	1–6, 6–7 ^{(2)}
Loss	2–3	Nov 2013	Soho Square Tournament, Egypt	75,000	Clay	(Russia) Victoria Kan	4–6, 4–6
Win	3–3	Jan 2014	ITF Kaarst, Germany	10,000	Carpet (i)	(Russia) Natela Dzalamidze	4–6, 6–1, 6–4
Win	4–3	Jun 2014	ITF Ystad, Sweden	25,000	Clay	(Poland) Sandra Zaniewska	6–4, 6–4
Loss	4–4	Jun 2015	ITF Lenzerheide, Switzerland	25,000	Clay	(Czech Republic) Tereza Martincová	3–6, 4–6
Loss	4–5	Jun 2016	ITF Antalya, Turkey	10,000	Hard	(Slovakia) Zuzana Zlochová	6–3, 2–6, 0–3 ret.
Loss	4–6	Apr 2017	ITF Heraklion, Greece	15,000	Clay	(Australia) Nina Alibalić	1–6, 3–6
Loss	4–7	Sep 2017	ITF Prague, Czech Republic	15,000	Clay	(Czech Republic) Miriam Kolodziejová	2–6, 7–5, 4–6
Loss	4–8	Oct 2017	ITF Sharm El Sheikh, Egypt	15,000	Hard	(Slovakia) Tereza Mihalíková	2–6, 4–6
Loss	4–9	Dec 2017	ITF Cairo, Egypt	15,000	Clay	(Egypt) Sandra Samir	4–6, 1–6
Win	5–9	Feb 2018	ITF Sharm El Sheikh, Egypt	15,000	Hard	(Thailand) Bunyawi Thamchaiwat	6–2, 6–4
Win	6–9	Mar 2018	ITF Manama, Bahrain	15,000	Hard	(Slovakia) Tereza Mihalíková	6–4, 6–2
Win	7–9	Apr 2018	ITF Sharm El Sheikh, Egypt	15,000	Hard	(Russia) Angelina Gabueva	2–6, 6–4, 6–0
Win	8–9	Oct 2018	ITF Sharm El Sheikh, Egypt	15,000	Hard	(Russia) Anastasia Sukhotina	6–1, 6–1
Loss	8–10	Apr 2019	ITF Cairo, Egypt	15,000	Clay	(Greece) Despina Papamichail	3–6, 6–4, 4–6
Loss	8–11	Sep 2019	ITF Cairo, Egypt	15,000	Clay	(Egypt) Sandra Samir	3–6, 4–6
Win	9–11	Sep 2019	ITF Cairo, Egypt	15,000	Clay	(Egypt) Sandra Samir	6–3, 5–7, 7–6^{(4)}
Loss	9–12	Oct 2019	Lagos Open, Nigeria	25,000	Hard	(India) Riya Bhatia	5–7, 6–1, 3–6
Loss	9–13	Sep 2021	ITF Sozopol, Bulgaria	15,000	Hard	(Italy) Chiara Catini	6–4, 6–7^{(5)}, 3–6
Win	10–13	Oct 2021	ITF Sozopol, Bulgaria	15,000	Hard	(Greece) Martha Matoula	7–5, 3–6, 6–1

=== Doubles: 31 (16 titles, 15 runner-ups) ===
Result	W–L	Date	Tournament	Tier	Surface	Partner	Opponents	Score
Win	1–0	Aug 2009	ITF Velenje, Slovenia	10,000	Clay	(Slovenia) Polona Rebersak	(Romania) Camelia Hristea (Romania) Diana Marcu	6–3, 6–2
Win	2–0	Aug 2010	ITF Čakovec, Croatia	10,000	Clay	(Slovenia) Polona Rebersak	(Slovakia) Katarína Baranová (Slovakia) Simonka Parajová	6–0, 6–1
Loss	2–1	Aug 2013	ITF Innsbruck, Austria	10,000	Clay	(Slovenia) Polona Rebersak	(United Kingdom) Lucy Brown (Sweden) Hilda Melander	6–3, 3–6, [7–10]
Win	3–1	Aug 2013	ITF Pörtschach, Austria	10,000	Clay	(Slovenia) Polona Rebersak	(Italy) Gioia Barbieri (Italy) Giulia Sussarello	6–0, 2–6, [10–4]
Win	4–1	Jan 2014	ITF Kaarst, Germany	10,000	Carpet (i)	(Ukraine) Olga Ianchuk	(Germany) Vivian Heisen (Germany) Linda Prenkovic	7–5, 6–3
Win	5–1	Jun 2014	ITF Ystad, Sweden	25,000	Clay	(Austria) Yvonne Neuwirth	(Kazakhstan) Anna Danilina (Switzerland) Xenia Knoll	7–6^{(3)}, 3–6, [10–6]
Win	6–1	Sept 2014	ITF Monterrey, Mexico	25,000	Hard	(Slovakia) Chantal Škamlová	(Argentina) Florencia Molinero (Georgia (country)) Sofia Shapatava	6–3, 2–6, [10–5]
Loss	6–2	Nov 2014	ITF Sharm El Sheikh, Egypt	25,000	Hard	(Ukraine) Olga Ianchuk	(Germany) Antonia Lottner (Germany) Laura Siegemund	1–6, 1–6
Loss	6–3	Dec 2014	ITF Antalya, Turkey	10,000	Hard	(Georgia (country)) Ekaterine Gorgodze	(Georgia (country)) Sofia Kvatsabaia (Slovakia) Chantal Škamlová	w/o
Win	7–3	Dec 2014	Ankara Cup, Turkey	50,000	Hard	(Georgia (country)) Ekaterine Gorgodze	(Ukraine) Oleksandra Korashvili (Bulgaria) Elitsa Kostova	6–4, 7–6^{(5)}
Win	8–3	Apr 2015	ITF Santa Margherita die Pula, Italy	25,000	Clay	(Greece) Despina Papamichail	(Romania) Diana Buzean (Italy) Alice Matteucci	6–1, 1–6, [10–8]
Win	9–3	May 2015	ITF Maribor, Slovenia	25,000	Clay	(Georgia (country)) Ekaterine Gorgodze	(Czech Republic) Petra Krejsová (Czech Republic) Kateřina Vaňková	6–2, 6–4
Los	9–4	Dec 2015	ITF Antalya, Turkey	10,000	Hard	(Switzerland) Karin Kennel	(Russia) Aminat Kushkhova (Bulgaria) Julia Stamatova	5–7, 1–6
Win	10–4	Jan 2016	ITF Antalya, Turkey	10,000	Clay	(Bosnia and Herzegovina) Jasmina Tinjić	(Austria) Julia Grabher (Czech Republic) Anna Slováková	7–6^{(5)}, 3–6, [10–6]
Win	11–4	Mar 2016	ITF Sharm El Sheikh, Egypt	10,000	Hard	(Georgia (country)) Mariam Bolkvadze	(Ukraine) Oleksandra Korashvili (Russia) Margarita Lazareva	7–6^{(0)}, 7–5
Loss	11–5	May 2016	ITF Antalya, Turkey	10,000	Hard	(United Kingdom) Francesca Stephenson	(India) Kyra Shroff (India) Dhruthi Tatachar Venugopal	3–6, 7–5, [1–10]
Loss	11–6	May 2016	ITF Antalya, Turkey	10,000	Hard	(United Kingdom) Francesca Stephenson	(France) Lou Brouleau (France) Emma Léné	5–7, 3–6
Loss	11–7	11 June 2016	ITF Antalya, Turkey	10,000	Hard	(United Kingdom) Francesca Stephenson	(Australia) Masa Jovanovic (Netherlands) Phillis Vanenburg	w/o
Win	12–7	June 2016	Maribor Open, Slovenia	10,000	Clay	(United Kingdom) Francesca Stephenson	(Slovenia) Polona Reberšak (Romania) Gabriela Talabă	5–7, 6–0, [10–3]
Loss	12–8	July 2016	ITF Bad Waltersdorf, Austria	10,000	Clay	(United Kingdom) Francesca Stephenson	(Slovenia) Nina Potočnik (Slovenia) Polona Reberšak	3–6, 4–6
Loss	12–9	Feb 2017	ITF Antalya, Turkey	15,000	Clay	(Switzerland) Karin Kennel	(Turkey) Başak Eraydın (Russia) Valentyna Ivakhnenko	6–7^{(6)}, 2–6
Win	13–9	Apr 2017	ITF Heraklion, Greece	15,000	Clay	(Bosnia and Herzegovina) Jasmina Tinjić	(Serbia) Tamara Čurović (Paraguay) Camila Giangreco Campiz	6–1, 6–1
Loss	13–10	Oct 2017	ITF Sharm El Sheikh, Egypt	15,000	Hard	(Serbia) Barbara Bonić	(Netherlands) Nina Kruijer (Netherlands) Suzan Lamens	6–3, 5–7, [8–10]
Loss	13–11	Oct 2017	ITF Sharm El Sheikh, Egypt	15,000	Hard	(Austria) Caroline Ilowska	(Denmark) Emilie Francati (India) Kanika Vaidya	6–3, 5–7, [7–10]
Loss	13–12	Oct 2017	ITF Sharm El Sheikh, Egypt	15,000	Hard	(Romania) Elena-Teodora Cadar	(Egypt) Ola Abou Zekry (Sweden) Linnéa Malmqvist	7–5, 3–6, [3–10]
Win	14–12	Nov 2017	ITF Cairo, Egypt	15,000	Clay	(Japan) Rio Kitagawa	(Netherlands) Annick Melgers (Romania) Arina Vasilescu	6–2, 4–6, [10–4]
Win	15–12	Dec 2017	ITF Cairo, Egypt	15,000	Clay	(Japan) Rio Kitagawa	(Austria) Melanie Klaffner (Australia) Jelena Stojanovic	1–6, 6–4, [10–2]
Loss	15–13	April 2019	ITF Óbidos, Portugal	25,000	Carpet	(Georgia (country)) Mariam Bolkvadze	(Georgia (country)) Sofia Shapatava (United Kingdom) Emily Webley-Smith	1–6, 6–2, [9–11]
Loss	15–14	Dec 2019	ITF Cairo, Egypt	15,000	Clay	(Russia) Anna Makhorkina	(Russia) Maria Marfutina (Romania) Oana Georgeta Simion	6–3, 0–6, [2–10]
Loss	15–15	Oct 2021	ITF Sozopol, Bulgaria	15,000	Hard	(Bulgaria) Ani Vangelova	(Romania) Oana Gavrilă (Germany) Emily Seibold	0–6, 2–6
Win	16–15	Sep 2022	ITF Brașov, Romania	15,000	Clay	(Serbia) Bojana Marinković	(Romania) Ilinca Amariei (Romania) Ioana Gașpar	6–4, 6–4
