= 2013 ITF Women's Circuit (October–December) =

The 2013 ITF Women's Circuit is the 2013 edition of the second-tier tour for women's professional tennis. It is organised by the International Tennis Federation and is a tier below the WTA Tour. The ITF Women's Circuit includes tournaments with prize money ranging from $10,000 up to $100,000.

== Key ==
$100,000 tournaments
$75,000 tournaments
$50,000 tournaments
$25,000 tournaments
$15,000 tournaments
$10,000 tournaments
All titles

== Month ==
=== October ===
Week of	Tournament	Winner	Runners-up	Semifinalists	Quarterfinalists
October 7, 2013	Open GDF Suez de Touraine; Joué-lès-Tours, France; Hard (indoor) $50,000; Singles – Doubles	(Croatia) Mirjana Lučić-Baroni; 6–4, 6–2	(Belgium) An-Sophie Mestach	(United Kingdom) Tara Moore (Poland) Magda Linette	(Netherlands) Michaëlla Krajicek (Germany) Anna-Lena Friedsam (France) Amandine Hesse (Poland) Marta Domachowska
October 7, 2013	Open GDF Suez de Touraine; Joué-lès-Tours, France; Hard (indoor) $50,000; Singles – Doubles	(France) Julie Coin (Croatia) Ana Vrljić; 6–3, 4–6, [15–13]	(Czech Republic) Andrea Hlaváčková (Netherlands) Michaëlla Krajicek	(United Kingdom) Tara Moore (Poland) Magda Linette	(Netherlands) Michaëlla Krajicek (Germany) Anna-Lena Friedsam (France) Amandine Hesse (Poland) Marta Domachowska
October 7, 2013	Margaret River, Australia; Hard $25,000; Singles and doubles draws	(Estonia) Anett Kontaveit; 6–2, 6–4	(United States) Irina Falconi	(Australia) Olivia Rogowska (Australia) Monique Adamczak	(Belgium) Ysaline Bonaventure (Russia) Arina Rodionova (France) Irena Pavlovic (Japan) Erika Sema
October 7, 2013	Margaret River, Australia; Hard $25,000; Singles and doubles draws	(Thailand) Noppawan Lertcheewakarn (Russia) Arina Rodionova; 6–2, 3–6, [10–8]	(Australia) Monique Adamczak (Australia) Tammi Patterson	(Australia) Olivia Rogowska (Australia) Monique Adamczak	(Belgium) Ysaline Bonaventure (Russia) Arina Rodionova (France) Irena Pavlovic (Japan) Erika Sema
October 7, 2013	Tampico, Mexico; Hard $25,000; Singles and doubles draws	(Netherlands) Indy de Vroome; 6–4, 6–3	(Serbia) Doroteja Erić	(Bolivia) María Fernanda Álvarez Terán (Argentina) María Irigoyen	(United States) Denise Muresan (United States) Chieh-Yu Hsu (Poland) Justyna Jegiołka (Argentina) Catalina Pella
October 7, 2013	Tampico, Mexico; Hard $25,000; Singles and doubles draws	(Bolivia) María Fernanda Álvarez Terán (Argentina) María Irigoyen; 6–3, 6–4	(Mexico) Constanza Gorches (Mexico) Victoria Rodríguez	(Bolivia) María Fernanda Álvarez Terán (Argentina) María Irigoyen	(United States) Denise Muresan (United States) Chieh-Yu Hsu (Poland) Justyna Jegiołka (Argentina) Catalina Pella
October 7, 2013	Asunción, Paraguay; Clay $25,000; Singles and doubles draws	(Argentina) Florencia Molinero; 6–3, 7–6^{(7–5)}	(Paraguay) Verónica Cepede Royg	(Argentina) Vanesa Furlanetto (Brazil) Nathália Rossi	(Paraguay) Camila Giangreco Campiz (Brazil) Eduarda Piai (Argentina) Constanza Vega (Paraguay) Montserrat González
October 7, 2013	Asunción, Paraguay; Clay $25,000; Singles and doubles draws	(Argentina) Florencia Molinero (Brazil) Laura Pigossi; 5–7, 6–4, [10–8]	(Argentina) Vanesa Furlanetto (Argentina) Carolina Zeballos	(Argentina) Vanesa Furlanetto (Brazil) Nathália Rossi	(Paraguay) Camila Giangreco Campiz (Brazil) Eduarda Piai (Argentina) Constanza Vega (Paraguay) Montserrat González
October 7, 2013	Sant Cugat del Vallès, Spain; Clay $25,000; Singles and doubles draws	(Netherlands) Arantxa Rus; 6–4, 2–6, 6–2	(Italy) Alberta Brianti	(Ukraine) Sofiya Kovalets (Spain) Lara Arruabarrena	(Brazil) Teliana Pereira (Czech Republic) Kateřina Siniaková (Turkey) Pemra Özgen (Hungary) Réka-Luca Jani
October 7, 2013	Sant Cugat del Vallès, Spain; Clay $25,000; Singles and doubles draws	(Argentina) Tatiana Búa (Venezuela) Andrea Gámiz; 4–6, 6–2, [10–7]	(Spain) Lara Arruabarrena (United Kingdom) Amanda Carreras	(Ukraine) Sofiya Kovalets (Spain) Lara Arruabarrena	(Brazil) Teliana Pereira (Czech Republic) Kateřina Siniaková (Turkey) Pemra Özgen (Hungary) Réka-Luca Jani
October 7, 2013	Macon, United States; Hard $25,000; Singles and doubles draws	(Georgia (country)) Anna Tatishvili; 6–2, 1–6, 7–5	(Croatia) Ajla Tomljanović	(United States) Madison Brengle (Norway) Ulrikke Eikeri	(United States) Julia Boserup (United States) Jacqueline Cako (United States) Nicole Gibbs (United States) Allie Kiick
October 7, 2013	Macon, United States; Hard $25,000; Singles and doubles draws	(United States) Kristi Boxx (New Zealand) Abigail Guthrie; 3–6, 7–6^{(7–4)}, [10–4]	(United States) Emily Harman (United States) Elizabeth Lumpkin	(United States) Madison Brengle (Norway) Ulrikke Eikeri	(United States) Julia Boserup (United States) Jacqueline Cako (United States) Nicole Gibbs (United States) Allie Kiick
October 7, 2013	Ruse, Bulgaria; Clay $10,000; Singles and doubles draws	(Czech Republic) Diana Šumová; 6–1, 6–3	(North Macedonia) Lina Gjorcheska	(Bulgaria) Isabella Shinikova (Bulgaria) Borislava Botusharova	(Netherlands) Eva Wacanno (Belgium) Michaela Boev (Romania) Irina Maria Bara (Italy) Alice Matteucci
October 7, 2013	Ruse, Bulgaria; Clay $10,000; Singles and doubles draws	(Romania) Irina Maria Bara (Netherlands) Eva Wacanno; 6–1, 6–2	(North Macedonia) Lina Gjorcheska (Romania) Camelia Hristea	(Bulgaria) Isabella Shinikova (Bulgaria) Borislava Botusharova	(Netherlands) Eva Wacanno (Belgium) Michaela Boev (Romania) Irina Maria Bara (Italy) Alice Matteucci
October 7, 2013	Sharm el-Sheikh, Egypt; Hard $10,000; Singles and doubles draws	(Russia) Yana Sizikova; 6–2, 6–2	(Ukraine) Helen Ploskina	(Italy) Valeria Prosperi (Russia) Anna Morgina	(United States) Samantha Powers (Brazil) Karina Venditti (India) Natasha Palha (Australia) Chantelle Rigozzi
October 7, 2013	Sharm el-Sheikh, Egypt; Hard $10,000; Singles and doubles draws	(Russia) Anna Morgina (Russia) Yana Sizikova; 6–3, 6–2	(India) Natasha Palha (Brazil) Karina Venditti	(Italy) Valeria Prosperi (Russia) Anna Morgina	(United States) Samantha Powers (Brazil) Karina Venditti (India) Natasha Palha (Australia) Chantelle Rigozzi
October 7, 2013	Marathon-Athens, Greece; Hard $10,000; Singles and doubles draws	(Spain) Nuria Párrizas Díaz; 7–6^{(7–4)}, 2–6, 6–2	(Netherlands) Jainy Scheepens	(United Kingdom) Lucy Brown (Netherlands) Lisanne van Riet	(Greece) Martha Matoula (Chinese Taipei) Lee Pei-chi (Germany) Theresa Kleinsteuber (Germany) Laura Schaeder
October 7, 2013	Marathon-Athens, Greece; Hard $10,000; Singles and doubles draws	(United Kingdom) Lucy Brown (Germany) Alina Wessel; 6–0, 6–3	(Russia) Polina Leykina (Belarus) Darya Shulzanok	(United Kingdom) Lucy Brown (Netherlands) Lisanne van Riet	(Greece) Martha Matoula (Chinese Taipei) Lee Pei-chi (Germany) Theresa Kleinsteuber (Germany) Laura Schaeder
October 7, 2013	Antalya, Turkey; Clay $10,000; Singles and doubles draws	(Belgium) Marie Benoît; 6–1, 6–1	(Moldova) Anastasia Vdovenco	(Czech Republic) Martina Kubičíková (Serbia) Natalija Kostić	(Georgia (country)) Ekaterine Gorgodze (Ukraine) Olena Kyrpot (Netherlands) Gabriela van de Graaf (Belarus) Iryna Shymanovich
October 7, 2013	Antalya, Turkey; Clay $10,000; Singles and doubles draws	(Germany) Anna Klasen (Germany) Charlotte Klasen; 7–6^{(7–2)}, 6–2	(Kazakhstan) Asiya Dair (Chinese Taipei) Lee Hua-chen	(Czech Republic) Martina Kubičíková (Serbia) Natalija Kostić	(Georgia (country)) Ekaterine Gorgodze (Ukraine) Olena Kyrpot (Netherlands) Gabriela van de Graaf (Belarus) Iryna Shymanovich
October 14, 2013	Open GDF Suez Région Limousin; Limoges, France; Hard (indoor) $50,000; Singles – Doubles	(Czech Republic) Kristýna Plíšková; 3–6, 6–3, 6–2	(Austria) Tamira Paszek	(Spain) Sílvia Soler Espinosa (Germany) Anna-Lena Friedsam	(Czech Republic) Lucie Hradecká (Germany) Nina Zander (France) Claire Feuerstein (Ukraine) Anhelina Kalinina
October 14, 2013	Open GDF Suez Région Limousin; Limoges, France; Hard (indoor) $50,000; Singles – Doubles	(Switzerland) Viktorija Golubic (Poland) Magda Linette; 6–4, 6–4	(Italy) Nicole Clerico (Czech Republic) Nikola Fraňková	(Spain) Sílvia Soler Espinosa (Germany) Anna-Lena Friedsam	(Czech Republic) Lucie Hradecká (Germany) Nina Zander (France) Claire Feuerstein (Ukraine) Anhelina Kalinina
October 14, 2013	Makinohara, Japan; Grass $25,000; Singles and doubles draws	(Kazakhstan) Zarina Diyas; 6–3, 6–4	(Switzerland) Belinda Bencic	(Japan) Nao Hibino (Japan) Miharu Imanishi	(Japan) Shuko Aoyama (Thailand) Nudnida Luangnam (Japan) Miyabi Inoue (Japan) Eri Hozumi
October 14, 2013	Makinohara, Japan; Grass $25,000; Singles and doubles draws	(Japan) Eri Hozumi (Japan) Makoto Ninomiya; 6–1, 6–2	(Thailand) Nicha Lertpitaksinchai (Thailand) Peangtarn Plipuech	(Japan) Nao Hibino (Japan) Miharu Imanishi	(Japan) Shuko Aoyama (Thailand) Nudnida Luangnam (Japan) Miyabi Inoue (Japan) Eri Hozumi
October 14, 2013	Lagos, Nigeria; Hard $25,000; Singles and doubles draws	(Slovenia) Tadeja Majerič; 7–5, 7–5	(Slovenia) Dalila Jakupović	(United Kingdom) Naomi Broady (Romania) Cristina Dinu	(Austria) Melanie Klaffner (India) Prarthana Thombare (South Africa) Chanel Simmonds (Italy) Gioia Barbieri
October 14, 2013	Lagos, Nigeria; Hard $25,000; Singles and doubles draws	(United Kingdom) Naomi Broady (United Kingdom) Emily Webley-Smith; 3–6, 6–4, [10–7]	(Oman) Fatma Al-Nabhani (Romania) Cristina Dinu	(United Kingdom) Naomi Broady (Romania) Cristina Dinu	(Austria) Melanie Klaffner (India) Prarthana Thombare (South Africa) Chanel Simmonds (Italy) Gioia Barbieri
October 14, 2013	Rock Hill, United States; Hard $25,000; Singles and doubles draws	(Colombia) Mariana Duque; 6–3, 6–4	(Georgia (country)) Anna Tatishvili	(United States) Melanie Oudin (United States) Asia Muhammad	(United States) Allie Kiick (Canada) Françoise Abanda (United States) Madison Brengle (United States) Nicole Gibbs
October 14, 2013	Rock Hill, United States; Hard $25,000; Singles and doubles draws	(Colombia) Mariana Duque (Argentina) María Irigoyen; 4–6, 7–6^{(7–5)}, [12–10]	(United States) Allie Kiick (United States) Asia Muhammad	(United States) Melanie Oudin (United States) Asia Muhammad	(United States) Allie Kiick (Canada) Françoise Abanda (United States) Madison Brengle (United States) Nicole Gibbs
October 14, 2013	Burgas, Bulgaria; Clay $10,000; Singles and doubles draws	(Bulgaria) Dia Evtimova; 6–1, 6–2	(Bulgaria) Viktoriya Tomova	(Bulgaria) Borislava Botusharova (Bulgaria) Isabella Shinikova	(Turkey) Hülya Esen (Romania) Elena-Teodora Cadar (Italy) Alice Matteucci (Czech Republic) Diana Šumová
October 14, 2013	Burgas, Bulgaria; Clay $10,000; Singles and doubles draws	(Bulgaria) Dia Evtimova (Bulgaria) Viktoriya Tomova; 6–4, 6–3	(Italy) Federica Arcidiacono (Bulgaria) Julia Terziyska	(Bulgaria) Borislava Botusharova (Bulgaria) Isabella Shinikova	(Turkey) Hülya Esen (Romania) Elena-Teodora Cadar (Italy) Alice Matteucci (Czech Republic) Diana Šumová
October 14, 2013	Pereira, Colombia; Clay $10,000; Singles and doubles draws	(Netherlands) Anna Katalina Alzate Esmurzaeva; 6–1, 6–2	(Hungary) Szabina Szlavikovics	(Samoa) Steffi Carruthers (Netherlands) Jade Schoelink	(Ecuador) Doménica González (United States) Libby Muma (Colombia) Yuliana Monroy (Colombia) María Paulina Pérez
October 14, 2013	Pereira, Colombia; Clay $10,000; Singles and doubles draws	(Ecuador) Doménica González (Chile) Camila Silva; 6–4, 6–2	(Colombia) Sofía Múnera Sánchez (Hungary) Szabina Szlavikovics	(Samoa) Steffi Carruthers (Netherlands) Jade Schoelink	(Ecuador) Doménica González (United States) Libby Muma (Colombia) Yuliana Monroy (Colombia) María Paulina Pérez
October 14, 2013	Dubrovnik, Croatia; Clay $10,000; Singles and doubles draws	(Ukraine) Alyona Sotnikova; 7–6^{(8–6)}, 4–6, 7–6^{(7–5)}	(Russia) Olga Doroshina	(Czech Republic) Barbora Krejčíková (France) Sherazad Benamar	(Croatia) Iva Mekovec (Croatia) Jana Fett (Slovenia) Polona Reberšak (Czech Republic) Gabriela Pantůčková
October 14, 2013	Dubrovnik, Croatia; Clay $10,000; Singles and doubles draws	(Slovakia) Lenka Juríková (Czech Republic) Barbora Krejčíková; 7–5, 3–6, [10–4]	(Czech Republic) Gabriela Pantůčková (Slovenia) Polona Reberšak	(Czech Republic) Barbora Krejčíková (France) Sherazad Benamar	(Croatia) Iva Mekovec (Croatia) Jana Fett (Slovenia) Polona Reberšak (Czech Republic) Gabriela Pantůčková
October 14, 2013	Sharm el-Sheikh, Egypt; Hard $10,000; Singles and doubles draws	(Belgium) Elise Mertens; 2–6, 6–2, 6–4	(Belgium) Klaartje Liebens	(Poland) Sandra Zaniewska (India) Natasha Palha	(Czech Republic) Barbora Štefková (France) Pauline Payet (Italy) Valeria Prosperi (United Kingdom) Katy Dunne
October 14, 2013	Sharm el-Sheikh, Egypt; Hard $10,000; Singles and doubles draws	(Egypt) Ola Abou Zekry (Brazil) Karina Venditti; 6–4, 6–4	(France) Pauline Payet (Russia) Liudmila Vasilyeva	(Poland) Sandra Zaniewska (India) Natasha Palha	(Czech Republic) Barbora Štefková (France) Pauline Payet (Italy) Valeria Prosperi (United Kingdom) Katy Dunne
October 14, 2013	Heraklion, Greece; Carpet $10,000; Singles and doubles draws	(France) Laëtitia Sarrazin; 6–4, 6–0	(Germany) Laura Schaeder	(Switzerland) Lisa Sabino (Russia) Maria Marfutina	(Germany) Lena-Marie Hofmann (Japan) Nozomi Fujioka (Greece) Valentini Grammatikopoulou (Czech Republic) Dominika Paterová
October 14, 2013	Heraklion, Greece; Carpet $10,000; Singles and doubles draws	(Netherlands) Rosalie van der Hoek (Australia) Alexandra Nancarrow; 6–3, 4–6, [10–7]	(Japan) Nozomi Fujioka (Thailand) Tanaporn Thongsing	(Switzerland) Lisa Sabino (Russia) Maria Marfutina	(Germany) Lena-Marie Hofmann (Japan) Nozomi Fujioka (Greece) Valentini Grammatikopoulou (Czech Republic) Dominika Paterová
October 14, 2013	Quintana Roo, Mexico; Hard $10,000; Singles and doubles draws	(United States) Denise Muresan; 6–4, 6–1	(Mexico) Renata Zarazúa	(United States) Ashley Weinhold (Mexico) Victoria Rodríguez	(Russia) Angelina Zhuravleva (Mexico) Alejandra Cisneros (France) Brandy Mina (Guatemala) Daniela Schippers
October 14, 2013	Quintana Roo, Mexico; Hard $10,000; Singles and doubles draws	(United States) Denise Muresan (United States) Ashley Weinhold; 6–1, 7–5	(United States) Christiane Brigante (United States) Nikki Kallenberg	(United States) Ashley Weinhold (Mexico) Victoria Rodríguez	(Russia) Angelina Zhuravleva (Mexico) Alejandra Cisneros (France) Brandy Mina (Guatemala) Daniela Schippers
October 14, 2013	Antalya, Turkey; Clay $10,000; Singles and doubles draws	(Romania) Ana Bogdan; 6–4, 6–3	(Czech Republic) Martina Kubičíková	(Czech Republic) Jesika Malečková (Slovakia) Petra Uberalová	(Georgia (country)) Ekaterine Gorgodze (Serbia) Natalija Kostić (Russia) Anastasia Rudakova (Moldova) Anastasia Vdovenco
October 14, 2013	Antalya, Turkey; Clay $10,000; Singles and doubles draws	(Austria) Pia König (Poland) Barbara Sobaszkiewicz; 6–1, 6–4	(Belarus) Sviatlana Pirazhenka (Germany) Julia Wachaczyk	(Czech Republic) Jesika Malečková (Slovakia) Petra Uberalová	(Georgia (country)) Ekaterine Gorgodze (Serbia) Natalija Kostić (Russia) Anastasia Rudakova (Moldova) Anastasia Vdovenco
October 21, 2013	Internationaux Féminins de la Vienne; Poitiers, France; Hard (indoor) $100,000; Singles – Doubles	(Belarus) Aliaksandra Sasnovich; 6–1, 5–7, 6–4	(Sweden) Sofia Arvidsson	(Romania) Alexandra Cadanțu (United Kingdom) Heather Watson	(France) Pauline Parmentier (Netherlands) Michaëlla Krajicek (United States) Alison Riske (Germany) Annika Beck
October 21, 2013	Internationaux Féminins de la Vienne; Poitiers, France; Hard (indoor) $100,000; Singles – Doubles	(Czech Republic) Lucie Hradecká (Netherlands) Michaëlla Krajicek; 7–6^{(7–5)}, 6–2	(United States) Christina McHale (Romania) Monica Niculescu	(Romania) Alexandra Cadanțu (United Kingdom) Heather Watson	(France) Pauline Parmentier (Netherlands) Michaëlla Krajicek (United States) Alison Riske (Germany) Annika Beck
October 21, 2013	Bendigo Women's International (1); Bendigo, Australia; Hard $50,000; Singles – Doubles	(Australia) Casey Dellacqua; 6–4, 6–4	(Thailand) Noppawan Lertcheewakarn	(United States) Irina Falconi (Russia) Arina Rodionova	(Japan) Sachie Ishizu (France) Irena Pavlovic (Japan) Erika Sema (Australia) Viktorija Rajicic
October 21, 2013	Bendigo Women's International (1); Bendigo, Australia; Hard $50,000; Singles – Doubles	(Japan) Erika Sema (Japan) Yurika Sema; 3–6, 6–2, [11–9]	(Australia) Monique Adamczak (Australia) Olivia Rogowska	(United States) Irina Falconi (Russia) Arina Rodionova	(Japan) Sachie Ishizu (France) Irena Pavlovic (Japan) Erika Sema (Australia) Viktorija Rajicic
October 21, 2013	National Bank Challenger Saguenay; Saguenay, Canada; Hard (indoor) $50,000; Singles – Doubles	(Tunisia) Ons Jabeur; 6–7^{(0–7)}, 6–3, 6–3	(United States) Coco Vandeweghe	(Hungary) Tímea Babos (United States) Melanie Oudin	(United States) Jessica Pegula (Poland) Marta Domachowska (Canada) Françoise Abanda (France) Alizé Lim
October 21, 2013	National Bank Challenger Saguenay; Saguenay, Canada; Hard (indoor) $50,000; Singles – Doubles	(Poland) Marta Domachowska (Czech Republic) Andrea Hlaváčková; 7–5, 6–3	(Canada) Françoise Abanda (United States) Victoria Duval	(Hungary) Tímea Babos (United States) Melanie Oudin	(United States) Jessica Pegula (Poland) Marta Domachowska (Canada) Françoise Abanda (France) Alizé Lim
October 21, 2013	Herzliya, Israel; Hard $25,000; Singles and doubles draws	(Ukraine) Yuliya Beygelzimer; 6–3, 4–6, 5–2, ret.	(Slovakia) Kristína Kučová	(Turkey) Çağla Büyükakçay (Turkey) Başak Eraydın	(Israel) Julia Glushko (Ukraine) Anastasiya Vasylyeva (Slovakia) Michaela Hončová (Russia) Alexandra Panova
October 21, 2013	Herzliya, Israel; Hard $25,000; Singles and doubles draws	(Ukraine) Yuliya Beygelzimer (Ukraine) Anastasiya Vasylyeva; 6–3, 6–3	(Turkey) Başak Eraydın (Turkey) Melis Sezer	(Turkey) Çağla Büyükakçay (Turkey) Başak Eraydın	(Israel) Julia Glushko (Ukraine) Anastasiya Vasylyeva (Slovakia) Michaela Hončová (Russia) Alexandra Panova
October 21, 2013	Hamamatsu, Japan; Grass $25,000; Singles and doubles draws	(Japan) Shuko Aoyama; 7–6^{(7–4)}, 6–1	(Japan) Eri Hozumi	(Kazakhstan) Zarina Diyas (Switzerland) Belinda Bencic	(Japan) Miyabi Inoue (Georgia (country)) Sofia Shapatava (Japan) Akiko Yonemura (Japan) Rika Fujiwara
October 21, 2013	Hamamatsu, Japan; Grass $25,000; Singles and doubles draws	(Japan) Shuko Aoyama (Japan) Junri Namigata; 6–4, 6–3	(Switzerland) Belinda Bencic (Georgia (country)) Sofia Shapatava	(Kazakhstan) Zarina Diyas (Switzerland) Belinda Bencic	(Japan) Miyabi Inoue (Georgia (country)) Sofia Shapatava (Japan) Akiko Yonemura (Japan) Rika Fujiwara
October 21, 2013	Casablanca, Morocco; Clay $25,000; Singles and doubles draws	(Russia) Victoria Kan; 6–4, 6–4	(Ukraine) Olga Savchuk	(Bulgaria) Dia Evtimova (Germany) Laura Siegemund	(Serbia) Jovana Jakšić (Slovakia) Karin Morgošová (Poland) Paula Kania (Italy) Anastasia Grymalska
October 21, 2013	Casablanca, Morocco; Clay $25,000; Singles and doubles draws	(Poland) Paula Kania (Russia) Valeria Solovyeva; 7–6^{(7–3)}, 6–4	(Chile) Cecilia Costa Melgar (Italy) Anastasia Grymalska	(Bulgaria) Dia Evtimova (Germany) Laura Siegemund	(Serbia) Jovana Jakšić (Slovakia) Karin Morgošová (Poland) Paula Kania (Italy) Anastasia Grymalska
October 21, 2013	Lagos, Nigeria; Hard $25,000; Singles and doubles draws	(Italy) Gioia Barbieri; 3–6, 6–3, 3–0, ret.	(Russia) Nina Bratchikova	(Slovenia) Tadeja Majerič (United Kingdom) Naomi Broady	(Austria) Melanie Klaffner (Slovenia) Dalila Jakupović (Romania) Cristina Dinu (India) Prarthana Thombare
October 21, 2013	Lagos, Nigeria; Hard $25,000; Singles and doubles draws	(Oman) Fatma Al-Nabhani (Italy) Gioia Barbieri; 1–6, 6–4, [10–8]	(Switzerland) Conny Perrin (South Africa) Chanel Simmonds	(Slovenia) Tadeja Majerič (United Kingdom) Naomi Broady	(Austria) Melanie Klaffner (Slovenia) Dalila Jakupović (Romania) Cristina Dinu (India) Prarthana Thombare
October 21, 2013	Florence, United States; Hard $25,000; Singles and doubles draws	(Georgia (country)) Anna Tatishvili; 6–2, 4–6, 6–4	(United States) Madison Brengle	(United States) Asia Muhammad (Venezuela) Adriana Pérez	(Ukraine) Kateryna Yergina (Colombia) Catalina Castaño (United States) Christina Makarova (Portugal) Michelle Larcher de Brito
October 21, 2013	Florence, United States; Hard $25,000; Singles and doubles draws	(United States) Anamika Bhargava (United States) Madison Brengle; 7–5, 7–5	(United States) Kristi Boxx (New Zealand) Abigail Guthrie	(United States) Asia Muhammad (Venezuela) Adriana Pérez	(Ukraine) Kateryna Yergina (Colombia) Catalina Castaño (United States) Christina Makarova (Portugal) Michelle Larcher de Brito
October 21, 2013	Marcos Juárez, Argentina; Clay $10,000; Singles and doubles draws	(Argentina) Carolina Zeballos; 4–6, 7–6^{(7–3)}, 7–5	(Argentina) Julieta Lara Estable	(Argentina) Constanza Vega (Chile) Fernanda Brito	(Argentina) Nadia Podoroska (Chile) Ivania Martinich (Uruguay) Carolina de los Santos (Argentina) Sofía Luini
October 21, 2013	Marcos Juárez, Argentina; Clay $10,000; Singles and doubles draws	(Argentina) Carla Bruzzesi Avella (Argentina) Carolina Zeballos; 6–2, 6–2	(Argentina) Sofía Luini (Argentina) Guadalupe Pérez Rojas	(Argentina) Constanza Vega (Chile) Fernanda Brito	(Argentina) Nadia Podoroska (Chile) Ivania Martinich (Uruguay) Carolina de los Santos (Argentina) Sofía Luini
October 21, 2013	Bogotá, Colombia; Hard $10,000; Singles and doubles draws	(Chile) Andrea Koch Benvenuto; 6–3, 6–3	(Netherlands) Anna Katalina Alzate Esmurzaeva	(Paraguay) Montserrat González (Hungary) Szabina Szlavikovics	(Colombia) Paula Andrea Pérez (Hungary) Naomi Totka (Netherlands) Jade Schoelink (Chile) Camila Silva
October 21, 2013	Bogotá, Colombia; Hard $10,000; Singles and doubles draws	(Ecuador) Doménica González (Chile) Camila Silva; 6–2, 6–4	(Netherlands) Anna Katalina Alzate Esmurazaeva (Netherlands) Jade Schoelink	(Paraguay) Montserrat González (Hungary) Szabina Szlavikovics	(Colombia) Paula Andrea Pérez (Hungary) Naomi Totka (Netherlands) Jade Schoelink (Chile) Camila Silva
October 21, 2013	Dubrovnik, Croatia; Clay $10,000; Singles and doubles draws	(Czech Republic) Barbora Krejčíková; 6–1, 3–6, 6–0	(Slovenia) Polona Reberšak	(Hungary) Ágnes Bukta (Croatia) Iva Mekovec	(Hungary) Csilla Argyelán (Czech Republic) Gabriela Pantůčková (Slovakia) Lenka Juríková (Slovakia) Vivien Juhászová
October 21, 2013	Dubrovnik, Croatia; Clay $10,000; Singles and doubles draws	(Hungary) Ágnes Bukta (Slovakia) Vivien Juhászová; 6–3, 6–3	(Slovakia) Lenka Juríková (Czech Republic) Barbora Krejčíková	(Hungary) Ágnes Bukta (Croatia) Iva Mekovec	(Hungary) Csilla Argyelán (Czech Republic) Gabriela Pantůčková (Slovakia) Lenka Juríková (Slovakia) Vivien Juhászová
October 21, 2013	Sharm el-Sheikh, Egypt; Hard $10,000; Singles and doubles draws	(Belgium) Elise Mertens; 6–7^{(0–7)}, 6–1, 6–3	(Belgium) Klaartje Liebens	(Poland) Sandra Zaniewska (France) Pauline Payet	(Italy) Valeria Prosperi (Ukraine) Valeriya Strakhova (India) Shweta Rana (Serbia) Natalija Kostić
October 21, 2013	Sharm el-Sheikh, Egypt; Hard $10,000; Singles and doubles draws	(Belgium) Elise Mertens (Poland) Sandra Zaniewska; 6–4, 6–7^{(5–7)}, [12–10]	(Ukraine) Valeriya Strakhova (Brazil) Karina Venditti	(Poland) Sandra Zaniewska (France) Pauline Payet	(Italy) Valeria Prosperi (Ukraine) Valeriya Strakhova (India) Shweta Rana (Serbia) Natalija Kostić
October 21, 2013	Heraklion, Greece; Carpet $10,000; Singles and doubles draws	(Germany) Lena-Marie Hofmann; 6–4, 4–6, 6–0	(Switzerland) Lisa Sabino	(France) Laëtitia Sarrazin (Australia) Alexandra Nancarrow	(Netherlands) Kelly Versteeg (Czech Republic) Dominika Paterová (Germany) Luisa Marie Huber (Romania) Nicoleta-Cătălina Dascălu
October 21, 2013	Heraklion, Greece; Carpet $10,000; Singles and doubles draws	(Netherlands) Rosalie van der Hoek (Netherlands) Mandy Wagemaker; 3–6, 6–0, [10–6]	(Czech Republic) Dominika Paterová (Czech Republic) Nikola Schweinerová	(France) Laëtitia Sarrazin (Australia) Alexandra Nancarrow	(Netherlands) Kelly Versteeg (Czech Republic) Dominika Paterová (Germany) Luisa Marie Huber (Romania) Nicoleta-Cătălina Dascălu
October 21, 2013	Quintana Roo, Mexico; Hard $10,000; Singles and doubles draws	(United States) Ashley Weinhold; 6–3, 4–6, 7–5	(Mexico) Renata Zarazúa	(United States) Denise Muresan (Mexico) Victoria Rodríguez	(Norway) Emma Flood (Mexico) Constanza Gorches (Mexico) Alejandra Cisneros (Germany) Stefanie Stemmer
October 21, 2013	Quintana Roo, Mexico; Hard $10,000; Singles and doubles draws	(Guatemala) Daniela Schippers (Dominican Republic) Francesca Segarelli; 7–5, 7–6^{(7–2)}	(Mexico) Constanza Gorches (Mexico) Jessica Hinojosa Gómez	(United States) Denise Muresan (Mexico) Victoria Rodríguez	(Norway) Emma Flood (Mexico) Constanza Gorches (Mexico) Alejandra Cisneros (Germany) Stefanie Stemmer
October 21, 2013	Stockholm, Sweden; Hard (indoor) $10,000; Singles and doubles draws	(Sweden) Rebecca Peterson; 7–6^{(7–2)}, 6–2	(Germany) Tayisiya Morderger	(Slovakia) Zuzana Luknárová (Sweden) Susanne Celik	(Sweden) Hilda Melander (Kazakhstan) Anna Danilina (Sweden) Cornelia Lister (France) Estelle Guisard
October 21, 2013	Stockholm, Sweden; Hard (indoor) $10,000; Singles and doubles draws	(Russia) Maria Mokh (Estonia) Eva Paalma; 6–2, 6–2	(Sweden) Emma Ek (Slovakia) Zuzana Luknárová	(Slovakia) Zuzana Luknárová (Sweden) Susanne Celik	(Sweden) Hilda Melander (Kazakhstan) Anna Danilina (Sweden) Cornelia Lister (France) Estelle Guisard
October 21, 2013	Antalya, Turkey; Clay $10,000; Singles and doubles draws	(Russia) Anastasia Rudakova; 6–1, 6–0	(Georgia (country)) Ekaterine Gorgodze	(Czech Republic) Martina Kubičíková (Austria) Pia König	(Netherlands) Quirine Lemoine (Belgium) Marie Benoît (France) Camille Cheli (Czech Republic) Jesika Malečková
October 21, 2013	Antalya, Turkey; Clay $10,000; Singles and doubles draws	(Netherlands) Gabriela van de Graaf (Netherlands) Quirine Lemoine; 6–3, 0–6, [10–7]	(Belgium) Marie Benoît (Belgium) Kimberley Zimmermann	(Czech Republic) Martina Kubičíková (Austria) Pia König	(Netherlands) Quirine Lemoine (Belgium) Marie Benoît (France) Camille Cheli (Czech Republic) Jesika Malečková
October 28, 2013	Aegon GB Pro-Series Barnstaple; Barnstaple, United Kingdom; Hard (indoor) $75,000; Singles – Doubles	(Russia) Marta Sirotkina; 6–7^{(5–7)}, 6–3, 7–6^{(8–6)}	(Czech Republic) Kristýna Plíšková	(Germany) Annika Beck (United Kingdom) Johanna Konta	(United Kingdom) Naomi Broady (Czech Republic) Kateřina Siniaková (United Kingdom) Heather Watson (United States) Alison Riske
October 28, 2013	Aegon GB Pro-Series Barnstaple; Barnstaple, United Kingdom; Hard (indoor) $75,000; Singles – Doubles	(United Kingdom) Naomi Broady (Czech Republic) Kristýna Plíšková; 6–3, 3–6, [10–5]	(Romania) Raluca Olaru (Austria) Tamira Paszek	(Germany) Annika Beck (United Kingdom) Johanna Konta	(United Kingdom) Naomi Broady (Czech Republic) Kateřina Siniaková (United Kingdom) Heather Watson (United States) Alison Riske
October 28, 2013	Open GDF Suez Nantes Atlantique; Nantes, France; Hard (indoor) $50,000+H; Singles – Doubles	(Belarus) Aliaksandra Sasnovich; 4–6, 6–4, 6–2	(Poland) Magda Linette	(Ukraine) Nadiia Kichenok (France) Claire Feuerstein	(France) Amandine Hesse (Spain) Lara Arruabarrena (France) Kinnie Laisné (France) Stéphanie Foretz Gacon
October 28, 2013	Open GDF Suez Nantes Atlantique; Nantes, France; Hard (indoor) $50,000+H; Singles – Doubles	(Czech Republic) Lucie Hradecká (Netherlands) Michaëlla Krajicek; 6–3, 6–2	(France) Stéphanie Foretz Gacon (Czech Republic) Eva Hrdinová	(Ukraine) Nadiia Kichenok (France) Claire Feuerstein	(France) Amandine Hesse (Spain) Lara Arruabarrena (France) Kinnie Laisné (France) Stéphanie Foretz Gacon
October 28, 2013	Bendigo Women's International (2); Bendigo, Australia; Hard $50,000; Singles – Doubles	(Australia) Casey Dellacqua; 6–3, 6–1	(Australia) Tammi Patterson	(France) Irena Pavlovic (Australia) Olivia Rogowska	(Croatia) Ema Mikulčić (Japan) Sachie Ishizu (Thailand) Noppawan Lertcheewakarn (Australia) Monique Adamczak
October 28, 2013	Bendigo Women's International (2); Bendigo, Australia; Hard $50,000; Singles – Doubles	(Australia) Monique Adamczak (Australia) Olivia Rogowska; 6–3, 2–6, [11–9]	(Australia) Stephanie Bengson (Australia) Sally Peers	(France) Irena Pavlovic (Australia) Olivia Rogowska	(Croatia) Ema Mikulčić (Japan) Sachie Ishizu (Thailand) Noppawan Lertcheewakarn (Australia) Monique Adamczak
October 28, 2013	Tevlin Women's Challenger; Toronto, Canada; Hard (indoor) $50,000; Singles – Doubles	(United States) Victoria Duval; 7–5, ret.	(Hungary) Tímea Babos	(United States) Melanie Oudin (Czech Republic) Andrea Hlaváčková	(Tunisia) Ons Jabeur (United States) Jessica Pegula (France) Alizé Lim (Luxembourg) Mandy Minella
October 28, 2013	Tevlin Women's Challenger; Toronto, Canada; Hard (indoor) $50,000; Singles – Doubles	(Canada) Françoise Abanda (United States) Victoria Duval; 7–6^{(7–5)}, 2–6, [11–9]	(United States) Melanie Oudin (United States) Jessica Pegula	(United States) Melanie Oudin (Czech Republic) Andrea Hlaváčková	(Tunisia) Ons Jabeur (United States) Jessica Pegula (France) Alizé Lim (Luxembourg) Mandy Minella
October 28, 2013	Caesar & Imperial Cup; Taipei, Taiwan; Hard $50,000; Singles – Doubles	(Poland) Paula Kania; 6–1, 6–3	(Kazakhstan) Zarina Diyas	(Belgium) Alison Van Uytvanck (Italy) Gioia Barbieri	(Japan) Mari Tanaka (Russia) Ekaterina Bychkova (Chinese Taipei) Chan Yung-jan (Netherlands) Arantxa Rus
October 28, 2013	Caesar & Imperial Cup; Taipei, Taiwan; Hard $50,000; Singles – Doubles	(Netherlands) Lesley Kerkhove (Netherlands) Arantxa Rus; 6–4, 2–6, [14–12]	(Chinese Taipei) Chen Yi (Thailand) Luksika Kumkhum	(Belgium) Alison Van Uytvanck (Italy) Gioia Barbieri	(Japan) Mari Tanaka (Russia) Ekaterina Bychkova (Chinese Taipei) Chan Yung-jan (Netherlands) Arantxa Rus
October 28, 2013	John Newcombe Women's Pro Challenge; New Braunfels, United States; Hard $50,000; Singles – Doubles	(Georgia (country)) Anna Tatishvili; 6–4, 6–4	(Bulgaria) Elitsa Kostova	(United States) Nicole Gibbs (United States) Danielle Lao	(United States) Louisa Chirico (United States) Maria Sanchez (United States) Sanaz Marand (United States) Madison Brengle
October 28, 2013	John Newcombe Women's Pro Challenge; New Braunfels, United States; Hard $50,000; Singles – Doubles	(Georgia (country)) Anna Tatishvili (United States) Coco Vandeweghe; 3–6, 6–3, [13–11]	(United States) Asia Muhammad (United States) Taylor Townsend	(United States) Nicole Gibbs (United States) Danielle Lao	(United States) Louisa Chirico (United States) Maria Sanchez (United States) Sanaz Marand (United States) Madison Brengle
October 28, 2013	Samsung Securities Cup; Seoul, South Korea; Hard $25,000; Singles – Doubles	(South Korea) Han Na-lae; 6–4, 6–4	(South Korea) Kim Da-hye	(Russia) Varvara Flink (South Korea) Lee So-ra	(South Korea) Lee Ye-ra (South Korea) Jang Su-jeong (China) Lu Jiajing (Japan) Nao Hibino
October 28, 2013	Samsung Securities Cup; Seoul, South Korea; Hard $25,000; Singles – Doubles	(South Korea) Han Na-lae (South Korea) Yoo Mi; 2–6, 6–3, [10–6]	(South Korea) Kim Sun-jung (South Korea) Yu Min-hwa	(Russia) Varvara Flink (South Korea) Lee So-ra	(South Korea) Lee Ye-ra (South Korea) Jang Su-jeong (China) Lu Jiajing (Japan) Nao Hibino
October 28, 2013	Istanbul, Turkey; Hard (indoor) $25,000; Singles and doubles draws	(Russia) Ksenia Pervak; 6–0, 7–5	(Ukraine) Anhelina Kalinina	(Uzbekistan) Nigina Abduraimova (Russia) Elizaveta Kulichkova	(Russia) Mayya Katsitadze (Ukraine) Kateryna Kozlova (Slovakia) Michaela Hončová (Czech Republic) Tereza Smitková
October 28, 2013	Istanbul, Turkey; Hard (indoor) $25,000; Singles and doubles draws	(Turkey) Çağla Büyükakçay (Turkey) Pemra Özgen; 6–3, 6–2	(Georgia (country)) Sofia Shapatava (Ukraine) Anastasiya Vasylyeva	(Uzbekistan) Nigina Abduraimova (Russia) Elizaveta Kulichkova	(Russia) Mayya Katsitadze (Ukraine) Kateryna Kozlova (Slovakia) Michaela Hončová (Czech Republic) Tereza Smitková
October 28, 2013	Caracas, Venezuela; Hard $25,000; Singles and doubles draws	(Paraguay) Verónica Cepede Royg; 6–2, 6–2	(Brazil) Laura Pigossi	(Paraguay) Montserrat González (Argentina) María Irigoyen	(Argentina) Florencia Molinero (Hungary) Szabina Szlavikovics (Argentina) Catalina Pella (Brazil) Maria Fernanda Alves
October 28, 2013	Caracas, Venezuela; Hard $25,000; Singles and doubles draws	(Paraguay) Verónica Cepede Royg (Venezuela) Adriana Pérez; 6–3, 6–3	(Argentina) Florencia Molinero (Brazil) Laura Pigossi	(Paraguay) Montserrat González (Argentina) María Irigoyen	(Argentina) Florencia Molinero (Hungary) Szabina Szlavikovics (Argentina) Catalina Pella (Brazil) Maria Fernanda Alves
October 28, 2013	Buenos Aires, Argentina; Clay $10,000; Singles and doubles draws	(Argentina) Carolina Zeballos; 6–4, 6–3	(Argentina) Sofía Blanco	(Argentina) Constanza Vega (Argentina) Sofía Luini	(Argentina) Carla Bruzzesi Avella (Chile) Fernanda Brito (Brazil) Laura Cardone (Argentina) Ana Madcur
October 28, 2013	Buenos Aires, Argentina; Clay $10,000; Singles and doubles draws	(Chile) Fernanda Brito (Uruguay) Carolina de los Santos; 7–6^{(7–3)}, 4–6, [10–6]	(Argentina) Ana Victoria Gobbi Monllau (Argentina) Constanza Vega	(Argentina) Constanza Vega (Argentina) Sofía Luini	(Argentina) Carla Bruzzesi Avella (Chile) Fernanda Brito (Brazil) Laura Cardone (Argentina) Ana Madcur
October 28, 2013	Umag, Croatia; Clay $10,000; Singles and doubles draws	(Czech Republic) Barbora Krejčíková; 6–1, 6–4	(Hungary) Ágnes Bukta	(Czech Republic) Gabriela Pantůčková (Serbia) Milana Špremo	(Slovenia) Polona Reberšak (Italy) Alice Balducci (Slovenia) Nika Kovač (Czech Republic) Tereza Malíková
October 28, 2013	Umag, Croatia; Clay $10,000; Singles and doubles draws	(Slovakia) Vivien Juhászová (Czech Republic) Tereza Malíková; 6–4, 7–6^{(7–5)}	(Hungary) Ágnes Bukta (Czech Republic) Barbora Krejčíková	(Czech Republic) Gabriela Pantůčková (Serbia) Milana Špremo	(Slovenia) Polona Reberšak (Italy) Alice Balducci (Slovenia) Nika Kovač (Czech Republic) Tereza Malíková
October 28, 2013	Sharm el-Sheikh, Egypt; Hard $10,000; Singles and doubles draws	(Poland) Sandra Zaniewska; 6–4, 6–1	(Italy) Valeria Prosperi	(Spain) Arabela Fernández Rabener (Ukraine) Valeriya Strakhova	(Italy) Giulia Bruzzone (Austria) Janina Toljan (Serbia) Natalija Kostić (Germany) Lena Lutzeier
October 28, 2013	Sharm el-Sheikh, Egypt; Hard $10,000; Singles and doubles draws	(France) Pauline Payet (Italy) Valeria Prosperi; 5–7, 6–4, [10–5]	(Italy) Giulia Bruzzone (India) Shweta Rana	(Spain) Arabela Fernández Rabener (Ukraine) Valeriya Strakhova	(Italy) Giulia Bruzzone (Austria) Janina Toljan (Serbia) Natalija Kostić (Germany) Lena Lutzeier
October 28, 2013	Heraklion, Greece; Carpet $10,000; Singles and doubles draws	(France) Laëtitia Sarrazin; 7–5, 6–2	(Poland) Natalia Siedliska	(Bulgaria) Julia Stamatova (Czech Republic) Veronika Kolářová	(Netherlands) Mandy Wagemaker (Czech Republic) Nikola Schweinerová (Netherlands) Rosalie van der Hoek (Germany) Luisa Marie Huber
October 28, 2013	Heraklion, Greece; Carpet $10,000; Singles and doubles draws	(Czech Republic) Veronika Kolářová (Czech Republic) Nikola Schweinerová; 6–4, 6–2	(Germany) Luisa Marie Huber (Germany) Carolin Schmidt	(Bulgaria) Julia Stamatova (Czech Republic) Veronika Kolářová	(Netherlands) Mandy Wagemaker (Czech Republic) Nikola Schweinerová (Netherlands) Rosalie van der Hoek (Germany) Luisa Marie Huber
October 28, 2013	Quintana Roo, Mexico; Hard $10,000; Singles and doubles draws	(Mexico) Victoria Rodríguez; 6–2, 6–4	(United States) Lauren Albanese	(Mexico) Constanza Gorches (Sweden) Matilda Hamlin	(Norway) Emma Flood (United States) Kate Turvy (Germany) Stefanie Stemmer (Netherlands) Jainy Scheepens
October 28, 2013	Quintana Roo, Mexico; Hard $10,000; Singles and doubles draws	(Canada) Khristina Blajkevitch (France) Brandy Mina; 7–6^{(7–2)}, 6–2	(Mexico) Carolina Betancourt (Mexico) Camila Fuentes	(Mexico) Constanza Gorches (Sweden) Matilda Hamlin	(Norway) Emma Flood (United States) Kate Turvy (Germany) Stefanie Stemmer (Netherlands) Jainy Scheepens
October 28, 2013	Benicarló, Spain; Clay $10,000; Singles and doubles draws	(Venezuela) Andrea Gámiz; 6–2, 6–0	(France) Jade Suvrijn	(Spain) Paula Badosa (Australia) Alexandra Nancarrow	(Russia) Aleksandra Zenovka (Spain) Olga Sáez Larra (Egypt) Mayar Sherif (France) Angela Leweurs
October 28, 2013	Benicarló, Spain; Clay $10,000; Singles and doubles draws	(Argentina) Tatiana Búa (Spain) Lucía Cervera Vázquez; 6–3, 6–0	(India) Sowjanya Bavisetti (China) Zhu Aiwen	(Spain) Paula Badosa (Australia) Alexandra Nancarrow	(Russia) Aleksandra Zenovka (Spain) Olga Sáez Larra (Egypt) Mayar Sherif (France) Angela Leweurs
October 28, 2013	Stockholm, Sweden; Hard (indoor) $10,000; Singles and doubles draws	(Sweden) Rebecca Peterson; 6–7^{(4–7)}, 6–2, 6–4	(Slovakia) Zuzana Luknárová	(Sweden) Susanne Celik (Switzerland) Tess Sugnaux	(Sweden) Donika Bashota (France) Clémence Fayol (Estonia) Eva Paalma (Germany) Julia Wachaczyk
October 28, 2013	Stockholm, Sweden; Hard (indoor) $10,000; Singles and doubles draws	(Sweden) Donika Bashota (Sweden) Susanne Celik; 6–1, 6–4	(Sweden) Emma Ek (Slovakia) Zuzana Luknárová	(Sweden) Susanne Celik (Switzerland) Tess Sugnaux	(Sweden) Donika Bashota (France) Clémence Fayol (Estonia) Eva Paalma (Germany) Julia Wachaczyk
October 28, 2013	Antalya, Turkey; Clay $10,000; Singles and doubles draws	(Romania) Patricia Maria Țig; 6–2, 4–2, ret.	(Romania) Raluca Elena Platon	(Belgium) Marie Benoît (Georgia (country)) Ekaterine Gorgodze	(Belgium) Kimberley Zimmermann (Austria) Pia König (Germany) Jil Nora Engelmann (Morocco) Rita Atik
October 28, 2013	Antalya, Turkey; Clay $10,000; Singles and doubles draws	(Romania) Diana Buzean (Romania) Raluca Elena Platon; 3–6, 6–3, [10–5]	(Georgia (country)) Ekaterine Gorgodze (Austria) Pia König	(Belgium) Marie Benoît (Georgia (country)) Ekaterine Gorgodze	(Belgium) Kimberley Zimmermann (Austria) Pia König (Germany) Jil Nora Engelmann (Morocco) Rita Atik

=== November ===
Week of	Tournament	Winner	Runners-up	Semifinalists	Quarterfinalists
November 4, 2013	Kemer Cup; Istanbul, Turkey; Hard (indoor) $50,000; Singles – Doubles	(Russia) Ksenia Pervak; 6–4, 7–6^{(7–4)}	(Czech Republic) Eva Birnerová	(Czech Republic) Tereza Smitková (Ukraine) Kateryna Kozlova	(Russia) Alexandra Panova (Russia) Marta Sirotkina (Serbia) Jovana Jakšić (Croatia) Ana Vrljić
November 4, 2013	Kemer Cup; Istanbul, Turkey; Hard (indoor) $50,000; Singles – Doubles	(Uzbekistan) Nigina Abduraimova (Italy) Maria Elena Camerin; 6–3, 2–6, [10–8]	(Slovenia) Tadeja Majerič (Romania) Andreea Mitu	(Czech Republic) Tereza Smitková (Ukraine) Kateryna Kozlova	(Russia) Alexandra Panova (Russia) Marta Sirotkina (Serbia) Jovana Jakšić (Croatia) Ana Vrljić
November 4, 2013	South Seas Island Resort Women's Pro Classic; Captiva Island, United States; Hard $50,000; Singles – Doubles	(Luxembourg) Mandy Minella; 6–3, 6–3	(Canada) Gabriela Dabrowski	(United States) Julia Cohen (United States) Allie Kiick	(United States) Nicole Gibbs (United States) Jessica Pegula (Bulgaria) Elitsa Kostova (United States) Julia Boserup
November 4, 2013	South Seas Island Resort Women's Pro Classic; Captiva Island, United States; Hard $50,000; Singles – Doubles	(Canada) Gabriela Dabrowski (United States) Allie Will; 6–1, 6–2	(United States) Julia Boserup (United States) Alexandra Mueller	(United States) Julia Cohen (United States) Allie Kiick	(United States) Nicole Gibbs (United States) Jessica Pegula (Bulgaria) Elitsa Kostova (United States) Julia Boserup
November 4, 2013	Équeurdreville, France; Hard (indoor) $25,000; Singles and doubles draws	(France) Amandine Hesse; 7–6^{(7–5)}, 3–6, 6–4	(Switzerland) Timea Bacsinszky	(France) Irina Ramialison (Latvia) Diāna Marcinkēviča	(Slovenia) Anja Prislan (Italy) Giulia Gatto-Monticone (Slovakia) Michaela Hončová (Germany) Kristina Barrois
November 4, 2013	Équeurdreville, France; Hard (indoor) $25,000; Singles and doubles draws	(Switzerland) Timea Bacsinszky (Germany) Kristina Barrois; 6–4, 6–3	(Latvia) Diāna Marcinkēviča (Netherlands) Eva Wacanno	(France) Irina Ramialison (Latvia) Diāna Marcinkēviča	(Slovenia) Anja Prislan (Italy) Giulia Gatto-Monticone (Slovakia) Michaela Hončová (Germany) Kristina Barrois
November 4, 2013	Astana, Kazakhstan; Hard (indoor) $25,000; Singles and doubles draws	(Ukraine) Nadiia Kichenok; 6–3, 6–1	(Belarus) Ilona Kremen	(Uzbekistan) Sabina Sharipova (Russia) Margarita Gasparyan	(Kazakhstan) Kamila Kerimbayeva (Russia) Alena Tarasova (Russia) Eugeniya Pashkova (Czech Republic) Kateřina Vaňková
November 4, 2013	Astana, Kazakhstan; Hard (indoor) $25,000; Singles and doubles draws	(Ukraine) Lyudmyla Kichenok (Ukraine) Nadiia Kichenok; 6–1, 6–1	(Russia) Alexandra Artamonova (Russia) Eugeniya Pashkova	(Uzbekistan) Sabina Sharipova (Russia) Margarita Gasparyan	(Kazakhstan) Kamila Kerimbayeva (Russia) Alena Tarasova (Russia) Eugeniya Pashkova (Czech Republic) Kateřina Vaňková
November 4, 2013	Phuket, Thailand; Hard (indoor) $15,000; Singles and doubles draws	(Hong Kong) Zhang Ling; 6–2, 7–6^{(9–7)}	(Thailand) Nicha Lertpitaksinchai	(China) Lu Jiajing (Australia) Isabella Holland	(Ukraine) Sofiya Kovalets (South Korea) Choi Ji-hee (France) Manon Arcangioli (Thailand) Patcharin Cheapchandej
November 4, 2013	Phuket, Thailand; Hard (indoor) $15,000; Singles and doubles draws	(China) Lu Jiajing (China) Lu Jiaxiang; 6–4, 7–5	(Thailand) Peangtarn Plipuech (Thailand) Varunya Wongteanchai	(China) Lu Jiajing (Australia) Isabella Holland	(Ukraine) Sofiya Kovalets (South Korea) Choi Ji-hee (France) Manon Arcangioli (Thailand) Patcharin Cheapchandej
November 4, 2013	Buenos Aires, Argentina; Clay $10,000; Singles and doubles draws	(Argentina) Vanesa Furlanetto; 7–6^{(7–5)}, 3–6, 7–6^{(7–4)}	(Argentina) Catalina Pella	(Argentina) Julieta Lara Estable (Argentina) Sofía Blanco	(Argentina) Sofía Luini (Argentina) Constanza Vega (Chile) Fernanda Brito (Argentina) Guadalupe Moreno
November 4, 2013	Buenos Aires, Argentina; Clay $10,000; Singles and doubles draws	(Argentina) Sofía Luini (Argentina) Catalina Pella; 6–4, 6–4	(Chile) Fernanda Brito (Uruguay) Carolina de los Santos	(Argentina) Julieta Lara Estable (Argentina) Sofía Blanco	(Argentina) Sofía Luini (Argentina) Constanza Vega (Chile) Fernanda Brito (Argentina) Guadalupe Moreno
November 4, 2013	São José do Rio Preto, Brazil; Clay $10,000; Singles and doubles draws	(Brazil) Gabriela Cé; 6–2, 4–6, 7–5	(Brazil) Carolina Alves	(Brazil) Nathália Rossi (Brazil) Nathaly Kurata	(Brazil) Eduarda Piai (Brazil) Suellen Abel (Brazil) Flávia Guimarães Bueno (Portugal) Ivone Álvaro
November 4, 2013	São José do Rio Preto, Brazil; Clay $10,000; Singles and doubles draws	(Brazil) Gabriela Cé (Brazil) Nathália Rossi; 6–3, 6–4	(Brazil) Carolina Alves (Brazil) Juliana Rocha Cardoso	(Brazil) Nathália Rossi (Brazil) Nathaly Kurata	(Brazil) Eduarda Piai (Brazil) Suellen Abel (Brazil) Flávia Guimarães Bueno (Portugal) Ivone Álvaro
November 4, 2013	Umag, Croatia; Clay $10,000; Singles and doubles draws	(Hungary) Ágnes Bukta; 6–0, 6–1	(Croatia) Adrijana Lekaj	(Slovakia) Vivien Juhászová (Croatia) Silvia Njirić	(Slovakia) Kristína Schmiedlová (Slovenia) Polona Reberšak (Ukraine) Alyona Sotnikova (Czech Republic) Tereza Malíková
November 4, 2013	Umag, Croatia; Clay $10,000; Singles and doubles draws	(Hungary) Ágnes Bukta (Slovakia) Vivien Juhászová; 6–4, 6–0	(Ukraine) Alyona Sotnikova (Italy) Giulia Sussarello	(Slovakia) Vivien Juhászová (Croatia) Silvia Njirić	(Slovakia) Kristína Schmiedlová (Slovenia) Polona Reberšak (Ukraine) Alyona Sotnikova (Czech Republic) Tereza Malíková
November 4, 2013	Sharm el-Sheikh, Egypt; Hard $10,000; Singles and doubles draws	(Serbia) Ivana Jorović; 6–0, 6–2	(Austria) Janina Toljan	(Switzerland) Nina Stadler (Romania) Elena-Teodora Cadar	(Czech Republic) Nikola Horáková (Italy) Giulia Bruzzone (Germany) Hanna Landener (Netherlands) Janneke Wikkerink
November 4, 2013	Sharm el-Sheikh, Egypt; Hard $10,000; Singles and doubles draws	(Russia) Natela Dzalamidze (Ukraine) Khristina Kazimova; 6–4, 6–3	(Romania) Elena-Teodora Cadar (Spain) Arabela Fernández Rabener	(Switzerland) Nina Stadler (Romania) Elena-Teodora Cadar	(Czech Republic) Nikola Horáková (Italy) Giulia Bruzzone (Germany) Hanna Landener (Netherlands) Janneke Wikkerink
November 4, 2013	Heraklion, Greece; Carpet $10,000; Singles and doubles draws	(Poland) Natalia Siedliska; 6–1, 6–4	(Czech Republic) Vendula Žovincová	(Switzerland) Karin Kennel (Germany) Luisa Marie Huber	(Belgium) Steffi Distelmans (Serbia) Marina Lazić (Romania) Ilka Csöregi (Ukraine) Nadiya Kolb
November 4, 2013	Heraklion, Greece; Carpet $10,000; Singles and doubles draws	(Hungary) Csilla Borsányi (Romania) Ilka Csöregi; 4–6, 6–3, [11–9]	(Ukraine) Maryna Kolb (Ukraine) Nadiya Kolb	(Switzerland) Karin Kennel (Germany) Luisa Marie Huber	(Belgium) Steffi Distelmans (Serbia) Marina Lazić (Romania) Ilka Csöregi (Ukraine) Nadiya Kolb
November 4, 2013	Lima, Peru; Clay $10,000; Singles and doubles draws	(Mexico) Ana Sofía Sánchez; 6–3, 5–7, 6–4	(Dominican Republic) Francesca Segarelli	(Colombia) María Fernanda Herazo (Colombia) María Paulina Pérez	(Paraguay) Gabriela Ferreira Sanabria (Chile) Macarena Olivares López (Chile) Andrea Koch Benvenuto (Paraguay) Sara Giménez
November 4, 2013	Lima, Peru; Clay $10,000; Singles and doubles draws	(Argentina) Aldana Ciccarelli (Dominican Republic) Francesca Segarelli; 6–2, 4–6, [10–5]	(Argentina) Daniela Farfán (Peru) Katherine Miranda Chang	(Colombia) María Fernanda Herazo (Colombia) María Paulina Pérez	(Paraguay) Gabriela Ferreira Sanabria (Chile) Macarena Olivares López (Chile) Andrea Koch Benvenuto (Paraguay) Sara Giménez
November 4, 2013	Vinaròs, Spain; Clay $10,000; Singles and doubles draws	(Spain) Olga Sáez Larra; 4–6, 7–5, 6–4	(Egypt) Mayar Sherif	(Venezuela) Andrea Gámiz (Greece) Maria Sakkari	(Spain) Lucía Cervera Vázquez (Spain) Paula Badosa (France) Jade Suvrijn (Mexico) Ximena Hermoso
November 4, 2013	Vinaròs, Spain; Clay $10,000; Singles and doubles draws	(Argentina) Tatiana Búa (Spain) Lucía Cervera Vázquez; 6–3, 6–2	(India) Sowjanya Bavisetti (China) Zhu Aiwen	(Venezuela) Andrea Gámiz (Greece) Maria Sakkari	(Spain) Lucía Cervera Vázquez (Spain) Paula Badosa (France) Jade Suvrijn (Mexico) Ximena Hermoso
November 4, 2013	Antalya, Turkey; Clay $10,000; Singles and doubles draws	(Romania) Patricia Maria Țig; 6–7^{(5–7)}, 6–2, 6–2	(Czech Republic) Martina Kubičíková	(Romania) Ana Bogdan (Georgia (country)) Ekaterine Gorgodze	(Georgia (country)) Sofia Kvatsabaia (Romania) Raluca Elena Platon (Romania) Diana Buzean (North Macedonia) Lina Gjorcheska
November 4, 2013	Antalya, Turkey; Clay $10,000; Singles and doubles draws	(Romania) Diana Buzean (Romania) Raluca Elena Platon; 7–5, 6–1	(North Macedonia) Lina Gjorcheska (Czech Republic) Martina Kubičíková	(Romania) Ana Bogdan (Georgia (country)) Ekaterine Gorgodze	(Georgia (country)) Sofia Kvatsabaia (Romania) Raluca Elena Platon (Romania) Diana Buzean (North Macedonia) Lina Gjorcheska
November 4, 2013	Aegon Pro-Series Loughborough; Loughborough, United Kingdom; Hard (indoor) $10,000; Singles and doubles draws	(United Kingdom) Anna Smith; 6–3, 7–5	(Belgium) Klaartje Liebens	(United Kingdom) Jasmine Amber Asghar (Slovakia) Nikola Vajdová	(Germany) Lena-Marie Hofmann (Italy) Camilla Rosatello (United Kingdom) Katy Dunne (United Kingdom) Freya Christie
November 4, 2013	Aegon Pro-Series Loughborough; Loughborough, United Kingdom; Hard (indoor) $10,000; Singles and doubles draws	(United Kingdom) Jocelyn Rae (United Kingdom) Anna Smith; 6–0, 4–6, [10–3]	(Italy) Francesca Palmigiano (Italy) Camilla Rosatello	(United Kingdom) Jasmine Amber Asghar (Slovakia) Nikola Vajdová	(Germany) Lena-Marie Hofmann (Italy) Camilla Rosatello (United Kingdom) Katy Dunne (United Kingdom) Freya Christie
November 11, 2013	Al Habtoor Tennis Challenge; Dubai, United Arab Emirates; Hard $75,000; Singles – Doubles	(Slovakia) Jana Čepelová; 6–1, 6–2	(Italy) Maria Elena Camerin	(Croatia) Ana Konjuh (Austria) Patricia Mayr-Achleitner	(Germany) Anna-Lena Friedsam (Ukraine) Lyudmyla Kichenok (Kazakhstan) Yulia Putintseva (Slovenia) Tadeja Majerič
November 11, 2013	Al Habtoor Tennis Challenge; Dubai, United Arab Emirates; Hard $75,000; Singles – Doubles	(Russia) Vitalia Diatchenko (Ukraine) Olga Savchuk; 7–5, 6–1	(Ukraine) Lyudmyla Kichenok (Ukraine) Nadiia Kichenok	(Croatia) Ana Konjuh (Austria) Patricia Mayr-Achleitner	(Germany) Anna-Lena Friedsam (Ukraine) Lyudmyla Kichenok (Kazakhstan) Yulia Putintseva (Slovenia) Tadeja Majerič
November 11, 2013	Minsk, Belarus; Hard (indoor) $25,000; Singles and doubles draws	(Russia) Margarita Gasparyan; 6–4, 6–4	(Ukraine) Anastasiya Vasylyeva	(Serbia) Jovana Jakšić (Russia) Polina Vinogradova	(Belarus) Aliaksandra Sasnovich (Belarus) Ilona Kremen (Georgia (country)) Sofia Shapatava (Ukraine) Elizaveta Ianchuk
November 11, 2013	Minsk, Belarus; Hard (indoor) $25,000; Singles and doubles draws	(Belarus) Ilona Kremen (Belarus) Aliaksandra Sasnovich; 7–6^{(7–3)}, 6–0	(Kazakhstan) Anna Danilina (Russia) Olga Doroshina	(Serbia) Jovana Jakšić (Russia) Polina Vinogradova	(Belarus) Aliaksandra Sasnovich (Belarus) Ilona Kremen (Georgia (country)) Sofia Shapatava (Ukraine) Elizaveta Ianchuk
November 11, 2013	Zawada, Poland; Carpet (indoor) $25,000; Singles and doubles draws	(Czech Republic) Kateřina Siniaková; 6–1, 6–3	(Germany) Nina Zander	(Latvia) Diāna Marcinkēviča (Germany) Kristina Barrois	(Czech Republic) Petra Krejsová (Poland) Magdalena Fręch (Czech Republic) Tereza Smitková (Slovakia) Rebecca Šramková
November 11, 2013	Zawada, Poland; Carpet (indoor) $25,000; Singles and doubles draws	(Czech Republic) Nikola Fraňková (Czech Republic) Tereza Smitková; 6–1, 2–6, [10–8]	(Poland) Justyna Jegiołka (Latvia) Diāna Marcinkēviča	(Latvia) Diāna Marcinkēviča (Germany) Kristina Barrois	(Czech Republic) Petra Krejsová (Poland) Magdalena Fręch (Czech Republic) Tereza Smitková (Slovakia) Rebecca Šramková
November 11, 2013	Mumbai, India; Hard $15,000; Singles and doubles draws	(India) Prarthana Thombare; 6–3, 6–7^{(10–12)}, 6–4	(Chinese Taipei) Hsu Ching-wen	(United States) Anamika Bhargava (India) Prerna Bhambri	(India) Natasha Palha (India) Rishika Sunkara (India) Riya Bhatia (India) Nidhi Chilumula
November 11, 2013	Mumbai, India; Hard $15,000; Singles and doubles draws	(United States) Anamika Bhargava (United Kingdom) Emily Webley-Smith; 6–4, 7–5	(Chinese Taipei) Hsu Ching-wen (United Kingdom) Eden Silva	(United States) Anamika Bhargava (India) Prerna Bhambri	(India) Natasha Palha (India) Rishika Sunkara (India) Riya Bhatia (India) Nidhi Chilumula
November 11, 2013	Phuket, Thailand; Hard (indoor) $15,000; Singles and doubles draws	(Hong Kong) Zhang Ling; 0–6, 7–6^{(7–2)}, 6–3	(China) Lu Jiajing	(Thailand) Kamonwan Buayam (Thailand) Nicha Lertpitaksinchai	(Chinese Taipei) Hsu Wen-hsin (Thailand) Peangtarn Plipuech (Thailand) Nudnida Luangnam (Slovakia) Zuzana Zlochová
November 11, 2013	Phuket, Thailand; Hard (indoor) $15,000; Singles and doubles draws	(Thailand) Nicha Lertpitaksinchai (Thailand) Peangtarn Plipuech; 3–6, 6–2, [10–8]	(China) Lu Jiajing (China) Lu Jiaxiang	(Thailand) Kamonwan Buayam (Thailand) Nicha Lertpitaksinchai	(Chinese Taipei) Hsu Wen-hsin (Thailand) Peangtarn Plipuech (Thailand) Nudnida Luangnam (Slovakia) Zuzana Zlochová
November 11, 2013	São José do Rio Preto, Brazil; Clay $10,000; Singles and doubles draws	(Brazil) Gabriela Cé; 7–6^{(7–3)}, 6–3	(Brazil) Nathália Rossi	(Brazil) Laura Pigossi (Brazil) Eduarda Piai	(Brazil) Ana-Paula Saviole (Argentina) Guadalupe Pérez Rojas (Brazil) Suellen Abel (Brazil) Nathaly Kurata
November 11, 2013	São José do Rio Preto, Brazil; Clay $10,000; Singles and doubles draws	(Brazil) Suellen Abel (Brazil) Eduarda Piai; 6–3, 7–6^{(7–3)}	(Brazil) Gabriela Cé (Brazil) Nathália Rossi	(Brazil) Laura Pigossi (Brazil) Eduarda Piai	(Brazil) Ana-Paula Saviole (Argentina) Guadalupe Pérez Rojas (Brazil) Suellen Abel (Brazil) Nathaly Kurata
November 11, 2013	Bol, Croatia; Clay $10,000; Singles and doubles draws	(Croatia) Ema Mikulčić; 6–2, 6–3	(Czech Republic) Gabriela Pantůčková	(Croatia) Iva Mekovec (Russia) Varvara Flink	(Czech Republic) Barbora Krejčíková (Croatia) Silvia Njirić (Romania) Irina Maria Bara (Serbia) Milana Špremo
November 11, 2013	Bol, Croatia; Clay $10,000; Singles and doubles draws	(Czech Republic) Barbora Krejčíková (Netherlands) Demi Schuurs; 6–2, 6–4	(Slovakia) Vivien Juhászová (Czech Republic) Tereza Malíková	(Croatia) Iva Mekovec (Russia) Varvara Flink	(Czech Republic) Barbora Krejčíková (Croatia) Silvia Njirić (Romania) Irina Maria Bara (Serbia) Milana Špremo
November 11, 2013	Sharm el-Sheikh, Egypt; Hard $10,000; Singles and doubles draws	(Serbia) Ivana Jorović; 6–2, 6–4	(Spain) Arabela Fernández Rabener	(Austria) Janina Toljan (Switzerland) Nina Stadler	(South Africa) Ilze Hattingh (Romania) Elena-Teodora Cadar (Russia) Natela Dzalamidze (Russia) Liudmila Vasilyeva
November 11, 2013	Sharm el-Sheikh, Egypt; Hard $10,000; Singles and doubles draws	(Ukraine) Alona Fomina (Germany) Christina Shakovets; 7–5, 6–4	(Italy) Giulia Bruzzone (France) Pauline Payet	(Austria) Janina Toljan (Switzerland) Nina Stadler	(South Africa) Ilze Hattingh (Romania) Elena-Teodora Cadar (Russia) Natela Dzalamidze (Russia) Liudmila Vasilyeva
November 11, 2013	Orto-Lääkärit Open; Helsinki, Finland; Hard (indoor) $10,000; Singles – Doubles	(Latvia) Jeļena Ostapenko; 7–5, 4–6, 7–5	(Sweden) Susanne Celik	(Russia) Anna Smolina (Netherlands) Quirine Lemoine	(Netherlands) Rosalie van der Hoek (Estonia) Eva Paalma (Finland) Petra Piirtola (Finland) Ella Leivo
November 11, 2013	Orto-Lääkärit Open; Helsinki, Finland; Hard (indoor) $10,000; Singles – Doubles	(Latvia) Jeļena Ostapenko (Estonia) Eva Paalma; 6–2, 5–7, [11–9]	(Netherlands) Quirine Lemoine (Czech Republic) Martina Přádová	(Russia) Anna Smolina (Netherlands) Quirine Lemoine	(Netherlands) Rosalie van der Hoek (Estonia) Eva Paalma (Finland) Petra Piirtola (Finland) Ella Leivo
November 11, 2013	Heraklion, Greece; Carpet $10,000; Singles and doubles draws	(Russia) Aminat Kushkhova; 6–2, 6–2	(Czech Republic) Vendula Žovincová	(Switzerland) Lisa Sabino (Hungary) Csilla Borsányi	(Ukraine) Oleksandra Piskun (Romania) Ilka Csöregi (United Kingdom) Laura Deigman (Bulgaria) Julia Stamatova
November 11, 2013	Heraklion, Greece; Carpet $10,000; Singles and doubles draws	(Hungary) Csilla Borsányi (Romania) Ilka Csöregi; 6–0, 6–1	(Belgium) Steffi Distelmans (Australia) Nana Miyakawa	(Switzerland) Lisa Sabino (Hungary) Csilla Borsányi	(Ukraine) Oleksandra Piskun (Romania) Ilka Csöregi (United Kingdom) Laura Deigman (Bulgaria) Julia Stamatova
November 11, 2013	Astana, Kazakhstan; Hard (indoor) $10,000; Singles and doubles draws	(Kazakhstan) Kamila Kerimbayeva; 6–1, 6–3	(Uzbekistan) Albina Khabibulina	(Kyrgyzstan) Ksenia Palkina (Russia) Alena Tarasova	(Russia) Anastasia Rudakova (Slovakia) Chantal Škamlová (Russia) Anastasiya Saitova (Russia) Veronica Miroshnichenko
November 11, 2013	Astana, Kazakhstan; Hard (indoor) $10,000; Singles and doubles draws	(Russia) Polina Monova (Russia) Alena Tarasova; 4–6, 6–1, [10–6]	(Uzbekistan) Albina Khabibulina (Kyrgyzstan) Ksenia Palkina	(Kyrgyzstan) Ksenia Palkina (Russia) Alena Tarasova	(Russia) Anastasia Rudakova (Slovakia) Chantal Škamlová (Russia) Anastasiya Saitova (Russia) Veronica Miroshnichenko
November 11, 2013	Oujda, Morocco; Clay $10,000; Singles and doubles draws	(France) Jade Suvrijn; 4–6, 6–4, 6–3	(Madagascar) Zarah Razafimahatratra	(Australia) Alexandra Nancarrow (France) Alix Collombon	(Austria) Natasha Bredl (Spain) Olga Parres Azcoitia (Austria) Tina Schiechtl (Belgium) Michelle Werbrouck
November 11, 2013	Oujda, Morocco; Clay $10,000; Singles and doubles draws	(Morocco) Lina Qostal (Madagascar) Zarah Razafimahatratra; 6–3, 7–5	(Australia) Alexandra Nancarrow (Spain) Olga Parres Azcoitia	(Australia) Alexandra Nancarrow (France) Alix Collombon	(Austria) Natasha Bredl (Spain) Olga Parres Azcoitia (Austria) Tina Schiechtl (Belgium) Michelle Werbrouck
November 11, 2013	Lima, Peru; Clay $10,000; Singles and doubles draws	(Chile) Andrea Koch Benvenuto; 7–5, 6–7^{(4–7)}, 6–2	(Peru) Patricia Kú Flores	(Mexico) Ana Sofía Sánchez (Argentina) Daniela Farfán	(Peru) Katherine Miranda Chang (Colombia) María Paulina Pérez (Peru) Mariana Demichelli Vergara (Paraguay) Gabriela Ferreira Sanabria
November 11, 2013	Lima, Peru; Clay $10,000; Singles and doubles draws	(Mexico) Ana Sofía Sánchez (Dominican Republic) Francesca Segarelli; 0–6, 6–4, [10–8]	(Argentina) Daniela Farfán (Colombia) María Fernanda Herazo	(Mexico) Ana Sofía Sánchez (Argentina) Daniela Farfán	(Peru) Katherine Miranda Chang (Colombia) María Paulina Pérez (Peru) Mariana Demichelli Vergara (Paraguay) Gabriela Ferreira Sanabria
November 11, 2013	Sant Jordi, Spain; Hard $10,000; Singles and doubles draws	(Spain) Paula Badosa; 7–5, 6–0	(Spain) Lucía Cervera Vázquez	(Spain) Nuria Párrizas Díaz (France) Joséphine Boualem	(France) Josepha Adam (India) Sowjanya Bavisetti (Spain) Alba Carrillo Marín (Ecuador) Charlotte Römer
November 11, 2013	Sant Jordi, Spain; Hard $10,000; Singles and doubles draws	(Portugal) Bárbara Luz (Spain) Nuria Párrizas Díaz; 7–5, 6–4	(India) Sowjanya Bavisetti (Spain) Lucía Cervera Vázquez	(Spain) Nuria Párrizas Díaz (France) Joséphine Boualem	(France) Josepha Adam (India) Sowjanya Bavisetti (Spain) Alba Carrillo Marín (Ecuador) Charlotte Römer
November 11, 2013	Antalya, Turkey; Clay $10,000; Singles and doubles draws	(Romania) Ana Bogdan; 7–6^{(7–5)}, 7–6^{(7–5)}	(Georgia (country)) Ekaterine Gorgodze	(North Macedonia) Lina Gjorcheska (Netherlands) Monique Zuur	(Romania) Raluca Elena Platon (Romania) Bianca Hîncu (Japan) Yoshimi Kawasaki (Georgia (country)) Sofia Kvatsabaia
November 11, 2013	Antalya, Turkey; Clay $10,000; Singles and doubles draws	(North Macedonia) Lina Gjorcheska (Moldova) Anastasia Vdovenco; 6–3, 6–2	(Romania) Diana Buzean (Romania) Raluca Elena Platon	(North Macedonia) Lina Gjorcheska (Netherlands) Monique Zuur	(Romania) Raluca Elena Platon (Romania) Bianca Hîncu (Japan) Yoshimi Kawasaki (Georgia (country)) Sofia Kvatsabaia
November 11, 2013	Manchester, United Kingdom; Hard (indoor) $10,000; Singles and doubles draws	(Belgium) Klaartje Liebens; 7–5, 6–1	(Slovakia) Natália Vajdová	(France) Carla Touly (Germany) Julia Wachaczyk	(Germany) Michaela Frlicka (United Kingdom) Freya Christie (United Kingdom) Anna Smith (Germany) Nora Niedmers
November 11, 2013	Manchester, United Kingdom; Hard (indoor) $10,000; Singles and doubles draws	(United Kingdom) Jocelyn Rae (United Kingdom) Anna Smith; 6–1, 6–4	(Netherlands) Eva Wacanno (Germany) Julia Wachaczyk	(France) Carla Touly (Germany) Julia Wachaczyk	(Germany) Michaela Frlicka (United Kingdom) Freya Christie (United Kingdom) Anna Smith (Germany) Nora Niedmers
November 18, 2013	Soho Square Ladies Tournament; Sharm el-Sheikh, Egypt; Clay $75,000+H; Singles – Doubles	(Russia) Victoria Kan; 6–4, 6–4	(Slovenia) Nastja Kolar	(Russia) Yuliya Kalabina (Switzerland) Timea Bacsinszky	(Serbia) Jovana Jakšić (Kazakhstan) Yulia Putintseva (Czech Republic) Kateřina Siniaková (Germany) Kristina Barrois
November 18, 2013	Soho Square Ladies Tournament; Sharm el-Sheikh, Egypt; Clay $75,000+H; Singles – Doubles	(Switzerland) Timea Bacsinszky (Germany) Kristina Barrois; 6–7^{(5–7)}, 6–0, [10–4]	(Russia) Anna Morgina (Czech Republic) Kateřina Siniaková	(Russia) Yuliya Kalabina (Switzerland) Timea Bacsinszky	(Serbia) Jovana Jakšić (Kazakhstan) Yulia Putintseva (Czech Republic) Kateřina Siniaková (Germany) Kristina Barrois
November 18, 2013	Dunlop World Challenge; Toyota, Japan; Carpet (indoor) $75,000+H; Singles – Doubles	(Thailand) Luksika Kumkhum; 3–6, 6–1, 6–3	(Japan) Hiroko Kuwata	(Thailand) Noppawan Lertcheewakarn (Switzerland) Belinda Bencic	(Japan) Kurumi Nara (Japan) Eri Hozumi (Japan) Miharu Imanishi (Japan) Misaki Doi
November 18, 2013	Dunlop World Challenge; Toyota, Japan; Carpet (indoor) $75,000+H; Singles – Doubles	(Japan) Shuko Aoyama (Japan) Misaki Doi; 7–6^{(7–1)}, 2–6, [11–9]	(Japan) Eri Hozumi (Japan) Makoto Ninomiya	(Thailand) Noppawan Lertcheewakarn (Switzerland) Belinda Bencic	(Japan) Kurumi Nara (Japan) Eri Hozumi (Japan) Miharu Imanishi (Japan) Misaki Doi
November 18, 2013	Bucha, Ukraine; Carpet (indoor) $25,000; Singles and doubles draws	(Russia) Polina Vinogradova; 4–6, 6–3, 6–4	(Ukraine) Anhelina Kalinina	(Poland) Justyna Jegiołka (Georgia (country)) Sofia Shapatava	(Ukraine) Anastasiya Vasylyeva (Liechtenstein) Kathinka von Deichmann (Ukraine) Tetyana Arefyeva (Germany) Tayisiya Morderger
November 18, 2013	Bucha, Ukraine; Carpet (indoor) $25,000; Singles and doubles draws	(Georgia (country)) Sofia Shapatava (Ukraine) Anastasiya Vasylyeva; 7–6^{(7–4)}, 6–2	(Ukraine) Anhelina Kalinina (Russia) Elizaveta Kulichkova	(Poland) Justyna Jegiołka (Georgia (country)) Sofia Shapatava	(Ukraine) Anastasiya Vasylyeva (Liechtenstein) Kathinka von Deichmann (Ukraine) Tetyana Arefyeva (Germany) Tayisiya Morderger
November 18, 2013	Bol, Croatia; Clay $10,000; Singles and doubles draws	(Croatia) Iva Mekovec; 6–7^{(9–11)}, 6–0, 6–3	(Serbia) Milana Špremo	(Czech Republic) Barbora Krejčíková (Croatia) Ema Mikulčić	(Slovenia) Natalija Šipek (Croatia) Tena Lukas (Romania) Irina Maria Bara (Slovenia) Polona Reberšak
November 18, 2013	Bol, Croatia; Clay $10,000; Singles and doubles draws	No doubles matches played due to heavy rain as a result of Cyclone Cleopatra.		(Czech Republic) Barbora Krejčíková (Croatia) Ema Mikulčić	(Slovenia) Natalija Šipek (Croatia) Tena Lukas (Romania) Irina Maria Bara (Slovenia) Polona Reberšak
November 18, 2013	Sharm el-Sheikh, Egypt; Hard $10,000; Singles and doubles draws	(Italy) Giulia Bruzzone; 6–3, 1–6, 6–4	(Russia) Natela Dzalamidze	(United Kingdom) Emily Webley-Smith (South Africa) Natasha Fourouclas	(Czech Republic) Gabriela Horáčková (United Kingdom) Manisha Foster (Romania) Elena-Teodora Cadar (United Kingdom) Katie Boulter
November 18, 2013	Sharm el-Sheikh, Egypt; Hard $10,000; Singles and doubles draws	(United Kingdom) Katie Boulter (Belgium) Justine De Sutter; 6–4, 7–6^{(8–6)}	(Russia) Natela Dzalamidze (Ukraine) Yuliya Hnateyko	(United Kingdom) Emily Webley-Smith (South Africa) Natasha Fourouclas	(Czech Republic) Gabriela Horáčková (United Kingdom) Manisha Foster (Romania) Elena-Teodora Cadar (United Kingdom) Katie Boulter
November 18, 2013	Astana, Kazakhstan; Hard (indoor) $10,000; Singles and doubles draws	(Uzbekistan) Sabina Sharipova; 7–5, 6–0	(Russia) Alena Tarasova	(Russia) Ivanka Karamalak (Kazakhstan) Asiya Dair	(Russia) Sofia Salimova (Kazakhstan) Alexandra Grinchishina (Kazakhstan) Kamila Kerimbayeva (Slovakia) Chantal Škamlová
November 18, 2013	Astana, Kazakhstan; Hard (indoor) $10,000; Singles and doubles draws	(Uzbekistan) Albina Khabibulina (Slovakia) Chantal Škamlová; 6–2, 6–3	(Kazakhstan) Asiya Dair (Russia) Ivanka Karamalak	(Russia) Ivanka Karamalak (Kazakhstan) Asiya Dair	(Russia) Sofia Salimova (Kazakhstan) Alexandra Grinchishina (Kazakhstan) Kamila Kerimbayeva (Slovakia) Chantal Škamlová
November 18, 2013	Fes, Morocco; Clay $10,000; Singles and doubles draws	(France) Jade Suvrijn; 6–4, 4–6, 6–0	(Austria) Pia König	(Madagascar) Zarah Razafimahatratra (France) Alix Collombon	(France) Amandine Cazeaux (Namibia) Lesedi Sheya Jacobs (Austria) Natasha Bredl (Spain) Olga Parres Azcoitia
November 18, 2013	Fes, Morocco; Clay $10,000; Singles and doubles draws	(Australia) Alexandra Nancarrow (Spain) Olga Parres Azcoitia; 6–4, 6–4	(Austria) Anna Maria Heil (Austria) Pia König	(Madagascar) Zarah Razafimahatratra (France) Alix Collombon	(France) Amandine Cazeaux (Namibia) Lesedi Sheya Jacobs (Austria) Natasha Bredl (Spain) Olga Parres Azcoitia
November 18, 2013	Castellón, Spain; Clay $10,000; Singles and doubles draws	(Spain) Lucía Cervera Vázquez; 6–1, 6–0	(Spain) Olga Sáez Larra	(Spain) Júlia Payola (Germany) Anna Klasen	(Algeria) Ines Ibbou (Spain) Alba Carrillo Marín (Italy) Martina Colmegna (Australia) Seone Mendez
November 18, 2013	Castellón, Spain; Clay $10,000; Singles and doubles draws	(Italy) Martina Colmegna (Germany) Anna Klasen; 6–1, 5–7, [10–5]	(Spain) Lucía Cervera Vázquez (China) Zhu Aiwen	(Spain) Júlia Payola (Germany) Anna Klasen	(Algeria) Ines Ibbou (Spain) Alba Carrillo Marín (Italy) Martina Colmegna (Australia) Seone Mendez
November 18, 2013	Antalya, Turkey; Clay $10,000; Singles and doubles draws	(Georgia (country)) Ekaterine Gorgodze; 4–6, 6–1, 6–4	(Romania) Diana Buzean	(Russia) Natalia Orlova (Romania) Bianca Hîncu	(Slovakia) Viktória Kužmová (North Macedonia) Lina Gjorcheska (Russia) Violetta Degtiareva (Moldova) Anastasia Vdovenco
November 18, 2013	Antalya, Turkey; Clay $10,000; Singles and doubles draws	(North Macedonia) Lina Gjorcheska (Moldova) Anastasia Vdovenco; 6–1, 2–6, [10–7]	(Romania) Bianca Hîncu (Japan) Kyōka Okamura	(Russia) Natalia Orlova (Romania) Bianca Hîncu	(Slovakia) Viktória Kužmová (North Macedonia) Lina Gjorcheska (Russia) Violetta Degtiareva (Moldova) Anastasia Vdovenco
November 25, 2013	Monterrey, Mexico; Hard $25,000; Singles and doubles draws	(Venezuela) Adriana Pérez; 4–6, 6–4, 6–3	(Netherlands) Indy de Vroome	(United States) Allie Kiick (United States) Chieh-Yu Hsu	(Canada) Françoise Abanda (Japan) Mayo Hibi (Argentina) Florencia Molinero (Japan) Naomi Osaka
November 25, 2013	Monterrey, Mexico; Hard $25,000; Singles and doubles draws	(Argentina) Florencia Molinero (Brazil) Laura Pigossi; 7–5, 7–5	(Netherlands) Indy de Vroome (Slovakia) Lenka Wienerová	(United States) Allie Kiick (United States) Chieh-Yu Hsu	(Canada) Françoise Abanda (Japan) Mayo Hibi (Argentina) Florencia Molinero (Japan) Naomi Osaka
November 25, 2013	São Paulo, Brazil; Clay $10,000; Singles and doubles draws	(Brazil) Gabriela Cé; 7–6^{(7–5)}, 7–5	(Argentina) Andrea Benítez	(Chile) Fernanda Brito (Chinese Taipei) Lee Pei-chi	(Argentina) Carla Lucero (Brazil) Eduarda Piai (Argentina) Guadalupe Pérez Rojas (Brazil) Nathália Rossi
November 25, 2013	São Paulo, Brazil; Clay $10,000; Singles and doubles draws	(Brazil) Nathaly Kurata (Brazil) Eduarda Piai; 6–1, 1–6, [10–8]	(Brazil) Gabriela Cé (Chinese Taipei) Lee Pei-chi	(Chile) Fernanda Brito (Chinese Taipei) Lee Pei-chi	(Argentina) Carla Lucero (Brazil) Eduarda Piai (Argentina) Guadalupe Pérez Rojas (Brazil) Nathália Rossi
November 25, 2013	Santiago, Chile; Clay $10,000; Singles and doubles draws	(Argentina) Nadia Podoroska; 6–2, 5–7, 3–5, ret.	(Chile) Cecilia Costa Melgar	(Argentina) Sofía Luini (Chile) Macarena Olivares López	(Argentina) Ana Madcur (Chile) Ivania Martinich (Chile) Camila Silva (Argentina) Guadalupe Moreno
November 25, 2013	Santiago, Chile; Clay $10,000; Singles and doubles draws	(Argentina) Sofía Luini (Argentina) Ana Madcur; 6–4, 6–7^{(5–7)}, [10–6]	(Argentina) Guadalupe Moreno (Chile) Camila Silva	(Argentina) Sofía Luini (Chile) Macarena Olivares López	(Argentina) Ana Madcur (Chile) Ivania Martinich (Chile) Camila Silva (Argentina) Guadalupe Moreno
November 25, 2013	Bogotá, Colombia; Clay $10,000; Singles and doubles draws	(Chile) Andrea Koch Benvenuto; 6–1, 6–1	(Hungary) Naomi Totka	(Colombia) María Fernanda Herazo (Colombia) Laura Arciniegas	(Brazil) Marina Danzini (Germany) Jasmin Jebawy (Colombia) Maria Paula Medina Blanco (Italy) Lara Rafful
November 25, 2013	Bogotá, Colombia; Clay $10,000; Singles and doubles draws	(Chile) Andrea Koch Benvenuto (United States) Daniella Roldan; 6–1, 6–4	(Colombia) María Fernanda Herazo (Hungary) Naomi Totka	(Colombia) María Fernanda Herazo (Colombia) Laura Arciniegas	(Brazil) Marina Danzini (Germany) Jasmin Jebawy (Colombia) Maria Paula Medina Blanco (Italy) Lara Rafful
November 25, 2013	Bol, Croatia; Clay $10,000; Singles and doubles draws	(Czech Republic) Barbora Krejčíková; 3–6, 6–0, 6–3	(Croatia) Ema Mikulčić	(Czech Republic) Gabriela Pantůčková (Serbia) Milana Špremo	(Croatia) Petra Granić (Slovenia) Polona Reberšak (Croatia) Tena Lukas (Croatia) Iva Mekovec
November 25, 2013	Bol, Croatia; Clay $10,000; Singles and doubles draws	(Czech Republic) Barbora Krejčíková (Romania) Ana Bianca Mihăilă; 6–2, 6–2	(Serbia) Bojana Marinković (Slovenia) Natalija Šipek	(Czech Republic) Gabriela Pantůčková (Serbia) Milana Špremo	(Croatia) Petra Granić (Slovenia) Polona Reberšak (Croatia) Tena Lukas (Croatia) Iva Mekovec
November 25, 2013	Sharm el-Sheikh, Egypt; Hard $10,000; Singles and doubles draws	(Belarus) Iryna Shymanovich; 6–4, 6–3	(United Kingdom) Emily Webley-Smith	(Spain) Arabela Fernández Rabener (France) Emmanuelle Salas	(Japan) Shiho Hisamatsu (South Africa) Madrie Le Roux (Romania) Elena-Teodora Cadar (United Kingdom) Manisha Foster
November 25, 2013	Sharm el-Sheikh, Egypt; Hard $10,000; Singles and doubles draws	(Spain) Arabela Fernández Rabener (Russia) Liudmila Vasilyeva; 6–0, 6–2	(South Africa) Ilze Hattingh (South Africa) Madrie Le Roux	(Spain) Arabela Fernández Rabener (France) Emmanuelle Salas	(Japan) Shiho Hisamatsu (South Africa) Madrie Le Roux (Romania) Elena-Teodora Cadar (United Kingdom) Manisha Foster
November 25, 2013	Rethymno, Greece; Hard $10,000; Singles and doubles draws	(United Kingdom) Katy Dunne; 6–3, 6–4	(Netherlands) Lisanne van Riet	(Russia) Margarita Lazareva (Bulgaria) Julia Stamatova	(Greece) Anastasia Rentouli (Germany) Sonja Larsen (Israel) Lee Or (Romania) Raluca Georgiana Șerban
November 25, 2013	Rethymno, Greece; Hard $10,000; Singles and doubles draws	(United Kingdom) Sarah Beth Askew (United Kingdom) Katy Dunne; 2–6, 6–4, [10–5]	(Russia) Margarita Lazareva (Netherlands) Lisanne van Riet	(Russia) Margarita Lazareva (Bulgaria) Julia Stamatova	(Greece) Anastasia Rentouli (Germany) Sonja Larsen (Israel) Lee Or (Romania) Raluca Georgiana Șerban
November 25, 2013	Fes, Morocco; Clay $10,000; Singles and doubles draws	(France) Jade Suvrijn; 7–5, 6–0	(Madagascar) Zarah Razafimahatratra	(Austria) Pia König (France) Alix Collombon	(France) Amandine Cazeaux (France) Marine Partaud (Morocco) Rita Atik (Australia) Alexandra Nancarrow
November 25, 2013	Fes, Morocco; Clay $10,000; Singles and doubles draws	(Australia) Alexandra Nancarrow (Spain) Olga Parres Azcoitia; 7–6^{(7–2)}, 6–3	(Morocco) Nadia Lalami (Ecuador) Charlotte Römer	(Austria) Pia König (France) Alix Collombon	(France) Amandine Cazeaux (France) Marine Partaud (Morocco) Rita Atik (Australia) Alexandra Nancarrow
November 25, 2013	Nules, Spain; Clay $10,000; Singles and doubles draws	(Spain) Olga Sáez Larra; 6–3, 6–2	(Switzerland) Lisa Sabino	(Greece) Maria Sakkari (Spain) Lucía Cervera Vázquez	(Italy) Anna Remondina (Algeria) Ines Ibbou (Spain) María del Rosario Cañero Pérez (Spain) Ariadna Martí Riembau
November 25, 2013	Nules, Spain; Clay $10,000; Singles and doubles draws	(Spain) Noelia Bouzó Zanotti (Algeria) Ines Ibbou; 7–5, 6–4	(Spain) María del Rosario Cañero Pérez (Spain) María José Luque Moreno	(Greece) Maria Sakkari (Spain) Lucía Cervera Vázquez	(Italy) Anna Remondina (Algeria) Ines Ibbou (Spain) María del Rosario Cañero Pérez (Spain) Ariadna Martí Riembau
November 25, 2013	Antalya, Turkey; Clay $10,000; Singles and doubles draws	(Ukraine) Alyona Sotnikova; 6–0, 7–6^{(7–2)}	(Moldova) Anastasia Vdovenco	(Slovakia) Karin Morgošová (Bosnia and Herzegovina) Anita Husarić	(Belgium) Kimberley Zimmermann (Russia) Natalia Orlova (France) Sarah Finck (Russia) Darya Kasatkina
November 25, 2013	Antalya, Turkey; Clay $10,000; Singles and doubles draws	(Serbia) Natalija Kostić (Slovakia) Karin Morgošová; 7–6^{(7–2)}, 6–4	(Bosnia and Herzegovina) Anita Husarić (Belgium) Kimberley Zimmermann	(Slovakia) Karin Morgošová (Bosnia and Herzegovina) Anita Husarić	(Belgium) Kimberley Zimmermann (Russia) Natalia Orlova (France) Sarah Finck (Russia) Darya Kasatkina

=== December ===
Week of	Tournament	Winner	Runners-up	Semifinalists	Quarterfinalists
December 2, 2013	Pune, India; Hard $25,000; Singles and doubles draw	(Poland) Magda Linette; 7–5, 7–6^{(7–5)}	(Kazakhstan) Kamila Kerimbayeva	(Latvia) Diāna Marcinkēviča (Italy) Gioia Barbieri	(Japan) Rika Fujiwara (Thailand) Nungnadda Wannasuk (Israel) Keren Shlomo (India) Prerna Bhambri
December 2, 2013	Pune, India; Hard $25,000; Singles and doubles draw	(Thailand) Nicha Lertpitaksinchai (Thailand) Peangtarn Plipuech; 7–5, 7–5	(United Kingdom) Jocelyn Rae (United Kingdom) Anna Smith	(Latvia) Diāna Marcinkēviča (Italy) Gioia Barbieri	(Japan) Rika Fujiwara (Thailand) Nungnadda Wannasuk (Israel) Keren Shlomo (India) Prerna Bhambri
December 2, 2013	Mérida, Mexico; Hard $25,000; Singles and doubles draw	(Sweden) Rebecca Peterson; 7–5, 4–6, 6–3	(Netherlands) Indy de Vroome	(Spain) Nuria Párrizas Díaz (Canada) Heidi El Tabakh	(Canada) Françoise Abanda (Argentina) Florencia Molinero (Slovakia) Petra Uberalová (Argentina) María Irigoyen
December 2, 2013	Mérida, Mexico; Hard $25,000; Singles and doubles draw	(United States) Chieh-Yu Hsu (Argentina) María Irigoyen; 6–4, 5–7, [10–6]	(Sweden) Hilda Melander (Sweden) Rebecca Peterson	(Spain) Nuria Párrizas Díaz (Canada) Heidi El Tabakh	(Canada) Françoise Abanda (Argentina) Florencia Molinero (Slovakia) Petra Uberalová (Argentina) María Irigoyen
December 2, 2013	Vendryně, Czech Republic; Hard (indoor) $15,000; Singles and doubles draws	(Russia) Ekaterina Alexandrova; 5–7, 7–6^{(7–0)}, 6–1	(Czech Republic) Kateřina Vaňková	(Switzerland) Lara Michel (Russia) Olga Doroshina	(Czech Republic) Barbora Štefková (Czech Republic) Petra Rohanová (Poland) Sandra Zaniewska (Czech Republic) Pernilla Mendesová
December 2, 2013	Vendryně, Czech Republic; Hard (indoor) $15,000; Singles and doubles draws	(Czech Republic) Martina Kubičíková (Czech Republic) Tereza Malíková; 7–6^{(7–2)}, 6–7^{(5–7)}, [10–7]	(Czech Republic) Pernilla Mendesová (Czech Republic) Karolína Vlachová	(Switzerland) Lara Michel (Russia) Olga Doroshina	(Czech Republic) Barbora Štefková (Czech Republic) Petra Rohanová (Poland) Sandra Zaniewska (Czech Republic) Pernilla Mendesová
December 2, 2013	São José dos Campos, Brazil; Clay $10,000; Singles and doubles draws	(Argentina) Catalina Pella; 6–3, 6–4	(Norway) Ulrikke Eikeri	(Brazil) Ana Clara Duarte (Brazil) Gabriela Cé	(Argentina) Guadalupe Pérez Rojas (Brazil) Nathália Rossi (Chinese Taipei) Lee Pei-chi (Argentina) Sofía Blanco
December 2, 2013	São José dos Campos, Brazil; Clay $10,000; Singles and doubles draws	(Brazil) Eduarda Piai (Argentina) Nadia Podoroska; 7–6^{(7–4)}, 7–5	(Chile) Fernanda Brito (Argentina) Stephanie Mariel Petit	(Brazil) Ana Clara Duarte (Brazil) Gabriela Cé	(Argentina) Guadalupe Pérez Rojas (Brazil) Nathália Rossi (Chinese Taipei) Lee Pei-chi (Argentina) Sofía Blanco
December 2, 2013	Barranquilla, Colombia; Clay $10,000; Singles and doubles draws	(Colombia) María Fernanda Herazo; 6–4, 6–2	(Chile) Andrea Koch Benvenuto	(Colombia) María Paulina Pérez (United States) Ryann Foster	(Samoa) Steffi Carruthers (Colombia) Paula Andrea Pérez (Colombia) María Gómez Saldarriaga (Hungary) Naomi Totka
December 2, 2013	Barranquilla, Colombia; Clay $10,000; Singles and doubles draws	(Colombia) María Paulina Pérez (Colombia) Paula Andrea Pérez; 6–1, 6–4	(Chile) Andrea Koch Benvenuto (United States) Daniella Roldan	(Colombia) María Paulina Pérez (United States) Ryann Foster	(Samoa) Steffi Carruthers (Colombia) Paula Andrea Pérez (Colombia) María Gómez Saldarriaga (Hungary) Naomi Totka
December 2, 2013	Djibouti, Djibouti; Hard $10,000; Singles and doubles draws	(Austria) Barbara Haas; 6–4, 6–3	(Chinese Taipei) Lee Hua-chen	(Russia) Yana Sizikova (Russia) Margarita Lazareva	(Russia) Evgeniya Svintsova (China) Wang Xiyao (India) Shweta Rana (India) Arantxa Andrady
December 2, 2013	Djibouti, Djibouti; Hard $10,000; Singles and doubles draws	(Chinese Taipei) Lee Hua-chen (Russia) Yana Sizikova; 6–3, 6–3	(India) Shweta Rana (China) Wang Xiyao	(Russia) Yana Sizikova (Russia) Margarita Lazareva	(Russia) Evgeniya Svintsova (China) Wang Xiyao (India) Shweta Rana (India) Arantxa Andrady
December 2, 2013	Sharm el-Sheikh, Egypt; Hard $10,000; Singles and doubles draws	(Romania) Elena-Teodora Cadar; 6–4, 4–6, 6–3	(Belarus) Iryna Shymanovich	(South Africa) Madrie Le Roux (United Kingdom) Katy Dunne	(Spain) Arabela Fernández Rabener (Russia) Aminat Kushkhova (Belgium) Klaartje Liebens (South Africa) Ilze Hattingh
December 2, 2013	Sharm el-Sheikh, Egypt; Hard $10,000; Singles and doubles draws	(United Kingdom) Harriet Dart (United Kingdom) Katy Dunne; 0–6, 6–4, [10–4]	(Hungary) Csilla Borsányi (Russia) Aminat Kushkhova	(South Africa) Madrie Le Roux (United Kingdom) Katy Dunne	(Spain) Arabela Fernández Rabener (Russia) Aminat Kushkhova (Belgium) Klaartje Liebens (South Africa) Ilze Hattingh
December 2, 2013	Hong Kong; Hard $10,000; Singles and doubles draws	(China) Zhao Di; 6–0, 4–6, 7–6^{(10–8)}	(China) Lu Jiajing	(China) Xu Shilin (Hong Kong) Wu Ho-ching	(South Korea) Lee Hye-min (China) Cai Xiwei (South Korea) Kim Da-hye (Australia) Ellen Perez
December 2, 2013	Hong Kong; Hard $10,000; Singles and doubles draws	(South Korea) Hong Shu-ying (South Korea) Lee Hye-min; 6–1, 7–6^{(7–2)}	(Chinese Taipei) Hsieh Shu-ying (Chinese Taipei) Yang Chia-hsien	(China) Xu Shilin (Hong Kong) Wu Ho-ching	(South Korea) Lee Hye-min (China) Cai Xiwei (South Korea) Kim Da-hye (Australia) Ellen Perez
December 2, 2013	Duino-Aurisina, Italy; Clay (indoor) $10,000; Singles and doubles draws	(Italy) Anastasia Grymalska; 6–3, 6–4	(Georgia (country)) Margalita Chakhnashvili	(Italy) Alice Matteucci (Hungary) Vanda Lukács	(Italy) Cristiana Ferrando (Italy) Claudia Giovine (Italy) Federica Di Sarra (Colombia) Yuliana Lizarazo
December 2, 2013	Duino-Aurisina, Italy; Clay (indoor) $10,000; Singles and doubles draws	(Italy) Claudia Giovine (Italy) Alice Matteucci; 7–6^{(7–4)}, 6–1	(Italy) Anastasia Grymalska (Colombia) Yuliana Lizarazo	(Italy) Alice Matteucci (Hungary) Vanda Lukács	(Italy) Cristiana Ferrando (Italy) Claudia Giovine (Italy) Federica Di Sarra (Colombia) Yuliana Lizarazo
December 2, 2013	Borriol, Spain; Clay $10,000; Singles and doubles draws	(Russia) Maria Marfutina; 1–6, 7–5, 6–3	(France) Léolia Jeanjean	(Spain) Ariadna Martí Riembau (Australia) Alexandra Nancarrow	(Netherlands) Mandy Wagemaker (France) Marine Partaud (Switzerland) Lisa Sabino (Greece) Maria Sakkari
December 2, 2013	Borriol, Spain; Clay $10,000; Singles and doubles draws	(France) Léolia Jeanjean (France) Marine Partaud; 4–6, 6–1, [10–3]	(United States) Tina Tehrani (Netherlands) Mandy Wagemaker	(Spain) Ariadna Martí Riembau (Australia) Alexandra Nancarrow	(Netherlands) Mandy Wagemaker (France) Marine Partaud (Switzerland) Lisa Sabino (Greece) Maria Sakkari
December 2, 2013	Antalya, Turkey; Clay $10,000; Singles and doubles draws	(Russia) Natela Dzalamidze; 2–6, 7–6^{(7–5)}, 6–3	(Ukraine) Alyona Sotnikova	(Switzerland) Karin Kennel (Netherlands) Gabriela van de Graaf	(South Africa) Natasha Fourouclas (Bosnia and Herzegovina) Anita Husarić (Serbia) Dajana Đukić (Germany) Lisa Matviyenko
December 2, 2013	Antalya, Turkey; Clay $10,000; Singles and doubles draws	(Russia) Natela Dzalamidze (Ukraine) Khristina Kazimova; 6–1, 6–0	(Netherlands) Gabriela van de Graaf (Czech Republic) Nikola Horáková	(Switzerland) Karin Kennel (Netherlands) Gabriela van de Graaf	(South Africa) Natasha Fourouclas (Bosnia and Herzegovina) Anita Husarić (Serbia) Dajana Đukić (Germany) Lisa Matviyenko
December 9, 2013	Mata de São João, Brazil; Clay $25,000; Singles and doubles draw	(Paraguay) Montserrat González; 6–3, 6–1	(Argentina) Catalina Pella	(Brazil) Teliana Pereira (Brazil) Gabriela Cé	(Brazil) Eduarda Piai (Portugal) Bárbara Luz (Brazil) Laura Pigossi (Brazil) Paula Cristina Gonçalves
December 9, 2013	Mata de São João, Brazil; Clay $25,000; Singles and doubles draw	(Brazil) Paula Cristina Gonçalves (Brazil) Laura Pigossi; 6–2, 6–2	(Paraguay) Montserrat González (Argentina) Carolina Zeballos	(Brazil) Teliana Pereira (Brazil) Gabriela Cé	(Brazil) Eduarda Piai (Portugal) Bárbara Luz (Brazil) Laura Pigossi (Brazil) Paula Cristina Gonçalves
December 9, 2013	Santiago, Chile; Clay $25,000; Singles and doubles draw	(Paraguay) Verónica Cepede Royg; 6–3, 6–4	(Argentina) María Irigoyen	(Norway) Ulrikke Eikeri (Chile) Daniela Seguel	(Chile) Andrea Koch Benvenuto (Netherlands) Cindy Burger (Chile) Cecilia Costa Melgar (Mexico) Ana Sofía Sánchez
December 9, 2013	Santiago, Chile; Clay $25,000; Singles and doubles draw	(Paraguay) Verónica Cepede Royg (Argentina) María Irigoyen; 2–6, 6–4, [10–5]	(Chile) Cecilia Costa Melgar (Chile) Daniela Seguel	(Norway) Ulrikke Eikeri (Chile) Daniela Seguel	(Chile) Andrea Koch Benvenuto (Netherlands) Cindy Burger (Chile) Cecilia Costa Melgar (Mexico) Ana Sofía Sánchez
December 9, 2013	Navi Mumbai, India; Hard $25,000; Singles and doubles draw	(Japan) Rika Fujiwara; 2–6, 7–6^{(7–5)}, 7–6^{(7–4)}	(Poland) Magda Linette	(Kazakhstan) Kamila Kerimbayeva (United Kingdom) Anna Smith	(China) Tang Haochen (Georgia (country)) Oksana Kalashnikova (Armenia) Ani Amiraghyan (Thailand) Peangtarn Plipuech
December 9, 2013	Navi Mumbai, India; Hard $25,000; Singles and doubles draw	(United Kingdom) Jocelyn Rae (United Kingdom) Anna Smith; 6–4, 7–6^{(7–5)}	(Georgia (country)) Oksana Kalashnikova (Latvia) Diāna Marcinkēviča	(Kazakhstan) Kamila Kerimbayeva (United Kingdom) Anna Smith	(China) Tang Haochen (Georgia (country)) Oksana Kalashnikova (Armenia) Ani Amiraghyan (Thailand) Peangtarn Plipuech
December 9, 2013	Mérida, Mexico; Hard $25,000; Singles and doubles draw	(Sweden) Rebecca Peterson; 6–4, 6–0	(Venezuela) Adriana Pérez	(Sweden) Hilda Melander (Canada) Heidi El Tabakh	(Canada) Marie-Alexandre Leduc (United States) Tori Kinard (Argentina) Vanesa Furlanetto (Russia) Marina Melnikova
December 9, 2013	Mérida, Mexico; Hard $25,000; Singles and doubles draw	(Argentina) Vanesa Furlanetto (Argentina) Florencia Molinero; 2–6, 7–6^{(10–8)}, [10–7]	(Romania) Laura-Ioana Andrei (Russia) Marina Melnikova	(Sweden) Hilda Melander (Canada) Heidi El Tabakh	(Canada) Marie-Alexandre Leduc (United States) Tori Kinard (Argentina) Vanesa Furlanetto (Russia) Marina Melnikova
December 9, 2013	Madrid, Spain; Hard $25,000; Singles and doubles draw	(France) Amandine Hesse; 4–6, 6–0, 6–2	(Czech Republic) Eva Birnerová	(France) Irina Ramialison (Poland) Sandra Zaniewska	(United Kingdom) Naomi Broady (Spain) Sara Sorribes Tormo (Spain) Paula Badosa (Bulgaria) Elitsa Kostova
December 9, 2013	Madrid, Spain; Hard $25,000; Singles and doubles draw	(Netherlands) Demi Schuurs (Netherlands) Eva Wacanno; 6–1, 6–2	(Bulgaria) Elitsa Kostova (Russia) Evgeniya Rodina	(France) Irina Ramialison (Poland) Sandra Zaniewska	(United Kingdom) Naomi Broady (Spain) Sara Sorribes Tormo (Spain) Paula Badosa (Bulgaria) Elitsa Kostova
December 9, 2013	Djibouti, Djibouti; Hard $10,000; Singles and doubles draws	(Austria) Barbara Haas; 6–3, 6–3	(Chinese Taipei) Lee Hua-chen	(India) Shweta Rana (Russia) Evgeniya Svintsova	(Russia) Yana Sizikova (United States) Alexandra Riley (India) Shivika Burman (Russia) Margarita Lazareva
December 9, 2013	Djibouti, Djibouti; Hard $10,000; Singles and doubles draws	(Chinese Taipei) Lee Hua-chen (Russia) Yana Sizikova; 4–6, 6–3, [10–4]	(Russia) Margarita Lazareva (Ukraine) Kateryna Sliusar	(India) Shweta Rana (Russia) Evgeniya Svintsova	(Russia) Yana Sizikova (United States) Alexandra Riley (India) Shivika Burman (Russia) Margarita Lazareva
December 9, 2013	Sharm el-Sheikh, Egypt; Hard $10,000; Singles and doubles draws	(United Kingdom) Katy Dunne; 6–3, 6–0	(Belgium) Klaartje Liebens	(France) Tessah Andrianjafitrimo (United Kingdom) Harriet Dart	(Serbia) Nina Stojanović (Russia) Aminat Kushkhova (Russia) Liudmila Vasilyeva (France) Margot Yerolymos
December 9, 2013	Sharm el-Sheikh, Egypt; Hard $10,000; Singles and doubles draws	(South Korea) Kim Hae-sung (South Korea) Kim Ju-eun; 7–6^{(8–6)}, 6–4	(United Kingdom) Harriet Dart (United Kingdom) Katy Dunne	(France) Tessah Andrianjafitrimo (United Kingdom) Harriet Dart	(Serbia) Nina Stojanović (Russia) Aminat Kushkhova (Russia) Liudmila Vasilyeva (France) Margot Yerolymos
December 9, 2013	Hong Kong; Hard $10,000; Singles and doubles draws	(China) Xu Shilin; 6–0, 6–3	(China) Zhao Di	(Japan) Akari Inoue (Chinese Taipei) Lee Ya-hsuan	(China) Lu Jiajing (France) Laëtitia Sarrazin (Japan) Yuka Higuchi (South Korea) Choi Ji-hee
December 9, 2013	Hong Kong; Hard $10,000; Singles and doubles draws	(Australia) Abbie Myers (Australia) Ellen Perez; 4–6, 6–3, [10–8]	(Chinese Taipei) Chuang Chia-jung (Chinese Taipei) Lee Ya-hsuan	(Japan) Akari Inoue (Chinese Taipei) Lee Ya-hsuan	(China) Lu Jiajing (France) Laëtitia Sarrazin (Japan) Yuka Higuchi (South Korea) Choi Ji-hee
December 9, 2013	Antalya, Turkey; Clay $10,000; Singles and doubles draws	(Romania) Irina Maria Bara; 6–4, 6–1	(Japan) Hikari Yamamoto	(Romania) Patricia Maria Țig (Switzerland) Conny Perrin	(Slovakia) Chantal Škamlová (Romania) Raluca Elena Platon (Russia) Natela Dzalamidze (Romania) Ioana Loredana Roșca
December 9, 2013	Antalya, Turkey; Clay $10,000; Singles and doubles draws	(Romania) Diana Buzean (Romania) Raluca Elena Platon; 7–5, 6–1	(Japan) Michika Ozeki (Japan) Hikari Yamamoto	(Romania) Patricia Maria Țig (Switzerland) Conny Perrin	(Slovakia) Chantal Škamlová (Romania) Raluca Elena Platon (Russia) Natela Dzalamidze (Romania) Ioana Loredana Roșca
December 16, 2013	Ankara Cup; Ankara, Turkey; Hard (indoor) $50,000; Singles – Doubles	(Russia) Vitalia Diatchenko; 6–7^{(3–7)}, 6–4, 6–4	(Russia) Marta Sirotkina	(Poland) Magda Linette (United Kingdom) Naomi Broady	(France) Amandine Hesse (United Kingdom) Tara Moore (Montenegro) Danka Kovinić (Turkey) Çağla Büyükakçay
December 16, 2013	Ankara Cup; Ankara, Turkey; Hard (indoor) $50,000; Singles – Doubles	(Ukraine) Yuliya Beygelzimer (Turkey) Çağla Büyükakçay; 6–3, 6–3	(Greece) Eleni Daniilidou (Serbia) Aleksandra Krunić	(Poland) Magda Linette (United Kingdom) Naomi Broady	(France) Amandine Hesse (United Kingdom) Tara Moore (Montenegro) Danka Kovinić (Turkey) Çağla Büyükakçay
December 16, 2013	Bertioga, Brazil; Hard $25,000; Singles and doubles draw	(Norway) Ulrikke Eikeri; 6–4, 2–6, 6–4	(Netherlands) Cindy Burger	(Brazil) Laura Pigossi (Paraguay) Verónica Cepede Royg	(Argentina) María Irigoyen (Portugal) Bárbara Luz (Argentina) Catalina Pella (Paraguay) Montserrat González
December 16, 2013	Bertioga, Brazil; Hard $25,000; Singles and doubles draw	(Brazil) Paula Cristina Gonçalves (Brazil) Laura Pigossi; 2–6, 6–4, [10–7]	(Paraguay) Verónica Cepede Royg (Argentina) María Irigoyen	(Brazil) Laura Pigossi (Paraguay) Verónica Cepede Royg	(Argentina) María Irigoyen (Portugal) Bárbara Luz (Argentina) Catalina Pella (Paraguay) Montserrat González
December 16, 2013	Mérida, Mexico; Hard $25,000; Singles and doubles draw	(United States) Allie Kiick; 3–6, 7–5, 6–0	(Croatia) Ajla Tomljanović	(Sweden) Rebecca Peterson (Sweden) Hilda Melander	(Bulgaria) Dia Evtimova (Canada) Heidi El Tabakh (United States) Julia Boserup (Canada) Jillian O'Neill
December 16, 2013	Mérida, Mexico; Hard $25,000; Singles and doubles draw	(Serbia) Barbara Bonić (Sweden) Hilda Melander; 6–3, 7–5	(Bulgaria) Dia Evtimova (United States) Chieh-Yu Hsu	(Sweden) Rebecca Peterson (Sweden) Hilda Melander	(Bulgaria) Dia Evtimova (Canada) Heidi El Tabakh (United States) Julia Boserup (Canada) Jillian O'Neill
December 16, 2013	Hong Kong; Hard $10,000; Singles and doubles draws	(China) Xu Shilin; 6–1, 6–4	(China) Tang Haochen	(South Korea) Lee Hye-min (China) Han Xinyun	(China) Lu Jiajing (Chinese Taipei) Lee Ya-hsuan (South Korea) Han Sung-hee (South Korea) Kang Seo-kyung
December 16, 2013	Hong Kong; Hard $10,000; Singles and doubles draws	(South Korea) Choi Ji-hee (Japan) Akari Inoue; 4–6, 6–1, [10–7]	(South Korea) Hong Seong-yeon (South Korea) Kang Seo-kyung	(South Korea) Lee Hye-min (China) Han Xinyun	(China) Lu Jiajing (Chinese Taipei) Lee Ya-hsuan (South Korea) Han Sung-hee (South Korea) Kang Seo-kyung
December 16, 2013	Antalya, Turkey; Clay $10,000; Singles and doubles draws	(Romania) Patricia Maria Țig; 6–2, 7–5	(Switzerland) Conny Perrin	(Romania) Irina Maria Bara (Romania) Raluca Elena Platon	(Poland) Olga Brózda (Romania) Diana Buzean (Italy) Alessia Piran (Italy) Martina Colmegna
December 16, 2013	Antalya, Turkey; Clay $10,000; Singles and doubles draws	(Romania) Irina Maria Bara (Switzerland) Conny Perrin; 6–3, 6–1	(Romania) Gabriela Talabă (Romania) Patricia Maria Țig	(Romania) Irina Maria Bara (Romania) Raluca Elena Platon	(Poland) Olga Brózda (Romania) Diana Buzean (Italy) Alessia Piran (Italy) Martina Colmegna
December 23, 2013	Istanbul, Turkey; Hard (indoor) $10,000; Singles and doubles draw	(Belgium) Elise Mertens; 7–5, 4–6, 6–4	(Denmark) Karen Barbat	(Ukraine) Olga Ianchuk (Russia) Olga Doroshina	(Russia) Ivanka Karamalak (Germany) Christina Shakovets (Japan) Yuuki Tanaka (Belarus) Lidziya Marozava
December 23, 2013	Istanbul, Turkey; Hard (indoor) $10,000; Singles and doubles draw	(Belgium) Elise Mertens (Turkey) İpek Soylu; 6–0, 7–6^{(7–3)}	(Japan) Yuuki Tanaka (Russia) Ekaterina Yashina	(Ukraine) Olga Ianchuk (Russia) Olga Doroshina	(Russia) Ivanka Karamalak (Germany) Christina Shakovets (Japan) Yuuki Tanaka (Belarus) Lidziya Marozava
