= 2013 Kemer Cup – Singles =

Singles
- 2013 Kemer Cup

Final
- Champion: (Russia) Ksenia Pervak
- Runner-up: (Czech Republic) Eva Birnerová
- Score: 6–4, 7–6^{(7–4)}

Events
Singles	Doubles
← 2012 ·	Kemer Cup	· 2014 →

This was a new event in 2013.

Ksenia Pervak won the tournament, defeating Eva Birnerová in the final, 6–4, 7–6^{(7–4)}.

== Seeds ==
1. (Hungary) ~~Tímea Babos~~ (withdrew)
2. (Slovakia) Jana Čepelová (second round)
3. (Austria) Patricia Mayr-Achleitner (second round)
4. (Slovenia) Tadeja Majerič (first round)
5. (Russia) Nina Bratchikova (first round; retired)
6. (Russia) Alexandra Panova (quarterfinals)
7. (Liechtenstein) Stephanie Vogt (first round; retired)
8. (Turkey) Çağla Büyükakçay (second round)

== Main draw ==
=== Key ===
- Q = Qualifier
- WC = Wild card
- LL = Lucky loser
- Alt = Alternate
- SE = Special exempt
- PR = Protected ranking
- ITF = ITF entry
- JE = Junior exempt
- w/o = Walkover
- r = Retired
- d = Defaulted
- SR = Special ranking

=== Finals ===
Semifinals
(Russia) Ksenia Pervak	6	6
Q	(Czech Republic) Tereza Smitková	4	4
(Ukraine) Kateryna Kozlova	0	4
(Czech Republic) Eva Birnerová	6	6

Final
(Russia) Ksenia Pervak	6	7^{7}
(Czech Republic) Eva Birnerová	4	6^{4}

=== Top half ===
First round
LL	(Germany) N Zander	4	3
(Uzbekistan) N Abduraimova	6	6
(Russia) K Pervak	2	6	3
Q	(Russia) E Kulichkova	6	0	0^{r}
LL	(Czech Republic) K Kramperová	7	6
(Romania) A Mitu	5	4
(Italy) A Brianti	3	0
6	(Russia) A Panova	6	6
4	(Slovenia) T Majerič	2	0
Q	(Czech Republic) T Smitková	6	6
WC	(Turkey) Ö Boz	6	5	6
WC	(Russia) A Bukhanko	2	7	3
(Russia) M Sirotkina	6	6
Q	(Bulgaria) V Tomova	4	4
WC	(Turkey) H Esen	2	2
8	(Turkey) Ç Büyükakçay	6	6

Second round
(Uzbekistan) N Abduraimova	3	6	2
(Russia) K Pervak	6	3	6
LL	(Czech Republic) K Kramperová	4	6	0
6	(Russia) A Panova	6	4	6
Q	(Czech Republic) T Smitková	6	6
WC	(Turkey) Ö Boz	0	0
(Russia) M Sirotkina	6	3	6
8	(Turkey) Ç Büyükakçay	4	6	3

Quarterfinals
(Russia) K Pervak	7	6
6	(Russia) A Panova	5	4
Q	(Czech Republic) T Smitková	6	6
(Russia) M Sirotkina	3	2

Semifinals
(Russia) K Pervak	6	6
Q	(Czech Republic) T Smitková	4	4

=== Bottom half ===
First round
7	(Liechtenstein) S Vogt	5	2^{r}
(Serbia) J Jakšić	7	3
(Turkey) P Özgen	6^{5}	5
(Czech Republic) R Voráčová	7^{7}	7
(Ukraine) K Kozlova	6	1
(Romania) A Dulgheru	0	0^{r}
WC	(Turkey) E Tomey	1	0
3	(Austria) P Mayr-Achleitner	6	6
5	(Russia) N Bratchikova	0	0^{r}
Q	(Romania) L-I Andrei	6	1
(Czech Republic) E Birnerová	6	6
(Romania) C Dinu	1	4
(Italy) ME Camerin	4	2
(Croatia) A Vrljić	6	6
(Ukraine) V Ivakhnenko	1	1
2	(Slovakia) J Čepelová	6	6

Second round
(Serbia) J Jakšić	6	6
(Czech Republic) R Voráčová	2	2
(Ukraine) K Kozlova	6	6
3	(Austria) P Mayr-Achleitner	2	0
Q	(Romania) L-I Andrei	3	3
(Czech Republic) E Birnerová	6	6
(Croatia) A Vrljić	2	7^{7}	7^{7}
2	(Slovakia) J Čepelová	6	6^{4}	6^{3}

Quarterfinals
(Serbia) J Jakšić	3	2
(Ukraine) K Kozlova	6	6
(Czech Republic) E Birnerová	0	7^{7}	6
(Croatia) A Vrljić	6	6^{5}	0

Semifinals
(Ukraine) K Kozlova	0	4
(Czech Republic) E Birnerová	6	6
