= Nika Kovač =

Slovenian anthropologist, sociologist, activist, and lecturer

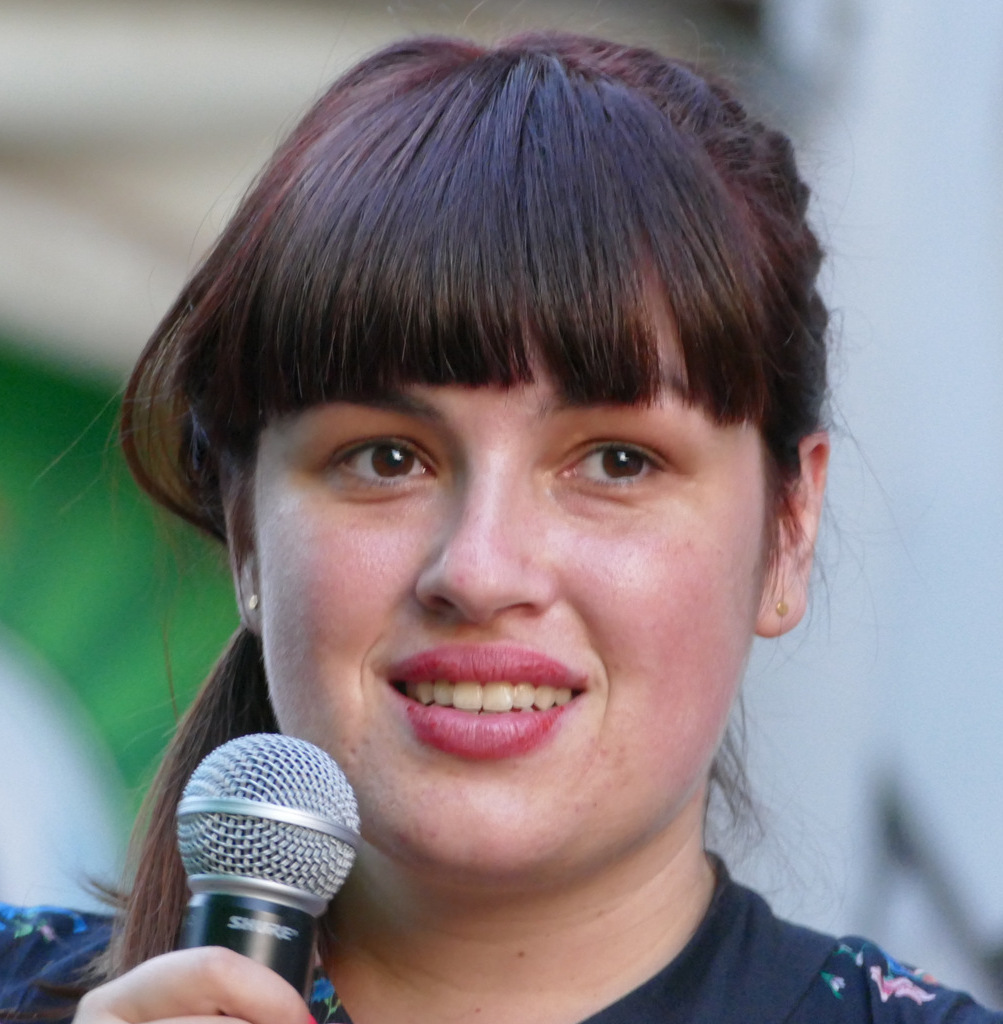
- Born: 1993 (age 32–33)
- Occupations: Anthropologist, sociologist, activist, lecturer
- Known for: Founding director of the 8th of March Institute; leadership in gender equality and social justice campaigns
- Awards: Vital Voices Global Leadership Award (2024), Slovenian Woman of the Year (2021)

Nika Kovač (born 1993) is a Slovenian anthropologist, sociologist, activist, and lecturer. She is the founding director of the 8th of March Institute, a prominent movement-building and advocacy organization in Slovenia recognized for its campaigns on gender equality, social justice, and democratic participation.

== Education and early career ==
Kovač holds a master’s degree in social and cultural anthropology from the University of Ljubljana. She was selected for the Obama Foundation Leaders: Europe program in 2020 and later as an Obama Scholar at Columbia University.

== Activism and leadership ==
In 2016, Kovač co-founded the 8th of March Institute (Inštitut 8. marec) in response to setbacks in women's rights and as a platform to address a broad range of social and gender inequalities in Slovenia. As director, she has led the Institute in using storytelling, grassroots organizing, and legal advocacy to confront issues such as sexual violence, reproductive rights, and economic injustice.

Kovač and her team initiated the Slovenian #jaztudi (#MeToo) campaign, breaking the silence around sexual violence and advocating for survivors. Under her leadership, the Institute played a key role in the successful campaign to legally redefine rape in Slovenia, enacting the "yes means yes" affirmative consent standard.

She has spoken publicly about facing threats and harassment due to her activism but continues to emphasize the importance of collective action and solidarity.

== Major campaigns ==
Kovač coordinated two landmark national referendum campaigns:

- In 2021, she led the campaign against the privatization and pollution of water, mobilizing over 600,000 citizens and resulting in the overwhelming rejection of the proposed law.
- In 2022, she led the campaign to defend the independence of public media, contributing to a record 71% voter turnout in the general election.

She has also coordinated the "My Voice, My Choice" campaign across Europe, advocating for reproductive rights and access to abortion.

== Publications and public engagement ==
Kovač is the author of Pogumne punce (Brave Girls), a collection of stories about women who changed history, and Moja odločitev (My Choice), which explores testimonies and prejudices regarding abortion in Slovenia. She is a frequent public speaker and has served as a coordinator for the Itn. (Etc.) Festival of Engaged Writing, connecting youth, writers, and activists.

== Recognition ==
Kovač has received multiple awards for her activism, including:

- Slovenian Woman of the Year (2021, Jana magazine)
- Vital Voices Global Leadership Award (2024)

She is widely credited with bringing the MeToo movement to Slovenia and for her role in advancing gender equality and democratic participation.
