= 2013 Kemer Cup – Doubles =

Doubles
- 2013 Kemer Cup

Final
- Champions: (Uzbekistan) Nigina Abduraimova (Italy) Maria Elena Camerin
- Runners-up: (Slovenia) Tadeja Majerič (Romania) Andreea Mitu
- Score: 6–3, 2–6, [10–8]

Events
Singles	Doubles
← 2012 ·	Kemer Cup	· 2014 →

This was a new event in 2013.

Nigina Abduraimova and Maria Elena Camerin won the tournament, defeating Tadeja Majerič and Andreea Mitu in the final, 6–3, 2–6, [10–8].

== Seeds ==
1. (Liechtenstein) Stephanie Vogt / (Czech Republic) Renata Voráčová (quarterfinals; withdrew)
2. (Russia) Nina Bratchikova / (United Kingdom) Emily Webley-Smith (first round)
3. (Turkey) Çağla Büyükakçay / (Turkey) Pemra Özgen (quarterfinals)
4. (Turkey) Başak Eraydın / (Turkey) Melis Sezer (semifinals)

== Draw ==
=== Key ===
- Q = Qualifier
- WC = Wild card
- LL = Lucky loser
- Alt = Alternate
- SE = Special exempt
- PR = Protected ranking
- ITF = ITF entry
- JE = Junior exempt
- w/o = Walkover
- r = Retired
- d = Defaulted
- SR = Special ranking

First round
(Romania) L-I Andrei (Russia) P Leykina	2	6	[10]
(Uzbekistan) N Abduraimova (Italy) ME Camerin	6	0	[12]
4	(Turkey) B Eraydın (Turkey) M Sezer	6	6
(Turkey) C Anıl (Russia) A Bukhanko	1	1
(Turkey) İT Köken (Romania) I Truca	0	0
(Ukraine) V Ivakhnenko (Ukraine) K Kozlova	6	6
WC	(Slovenia) T Majerič (Romania) A Mitu	6	6
(Turkey) G Güldaş (Turkey) E Tomey	0	0
(Slovakia) J Čepelová (Serbia) J Jakšić	2	6^{6}
3	(Turkey) Ç Büyükakçay (Turkey) P Özgen	6	7^{8}
(Turkey) M Bayraktaroğlu (Turkey) M Topsel	2	6^{0}
(Czech Republic) E Birnerová (Czech Republic) H Birnerová	6	7^{7}
(Turkey) H Esen (Turkey) L Esen	7^{7}	6
2	(Russia) N Bratchikova (United Kingdom) E Webley-Smith	6^{2}	2

Quarterfinals
1	(Liechtenstein) S Vogt (Czech Republic) R Voráčová
(Uzbekistan) N Abduraimova (Italy) ME Camerin	w/o
4	(Turkey) B Eraydın (Turkey) M Sezer	6	6
(Ukraine) V Ivakhnenko (Ukraine) K Kozlova	2	0
WC	(Slovenia) T Majerič (Romania) A Mitu	7^{7}	6
3	(Turkey) Ç Büyükakçay (Turkey) P Özgen	6^{1}	3
(Czech Republic) E Birnerová (Czech Republic) H Birnerová	3	4
(Turkey) H Esen (Turkey) L Esen	6	6

Semifinals
(Uzbekistan) N Abduraimova (Italy) ME Camerin	7	6
4	(Turkey) B Eraydın (Turkey) M Sezer	5	1
WC	(Slovenia) T Majerič (Romania) A Mitu	6	6
(Turkey) H Esen (Turkey) L Esen	3	1

Final
(Uzbekistan) N Abduraimova (Italy) ME Camerin	6	2	[10]
WC	(Slovenia) T Majerič (Romania) A Mitu	3	6	[8]
