= 2013 Kemer Cup =

- Date: 4–10 November
- Edition: 1st
- Category: ITF Women's Circuit
- Prize money: $50,000
- Surface: Hard (indoor)
- Location: Istanbul, Turkey

Champions

Singles
- (Russia) Ksenia Pervak

Doubles
- (Uzbekistan) Nigina Abduraimova / (Italy) Maria Elena Camerin
Kemer Cup	· 2014 →

The 2013 Kemer Cup was a professional tennis tournament played on indoor hard courts. It was the first edition of the tournament which was part of the 2013 ITF Women's Circuit, offering a total of $50,000 in prize money. It took place in Istanbul, Turkey, on 4–10 November 2013.

== Singles entrants ==
=== Seeds ===
Country	Player	Rank^{1}	Seed
HUN	~~Tímea Babos~~	~~95~~	~~1~~
SVK	Jana Čepelová	96	2
AUT	Patricia Mayr-Achleitner	102	3
SLO	Tadeja Majerič	112	4
RUS	Nina Bratchikova	135	5
RUS	Alexandra Panova	136	6
LIE	Stephanie Vogt	143	7
TUR	Çağla Büyükakçay	150	8

- ^{1} Rankings as of 28 October 2013

=== Other entrants ===
The following players received wildcards into the singles main draw:

- (Turkey) Öykü Boz
- (Russia) Anastasia Bukhanko
- (Turkey) Hülya Esen
- (Turkey) Ege Tomey

The following players received entry from the qualifying draw:

- (Romania) Laura-Ioana Andrei
- (Russia) Elizaveta Kulichkova
- (Czech Republic) Tereza Smitková
- (Bulgaria) Viktoriya Tomova

The following players received entry into the singles main draw as lucky losers:

- (Czech Republic) Kateřina Kramperová
- (Germany) Nina Zander

== Champions ==
=== Singles ===
- (Russia) Ksenia Pervak def. (Czech Republic) Eva Birnerová 6–4, 7–6^{(7–4)}

=== Doubles ===
- (Uzbekistan) Nigina Abduraimova / (Italy) Maria Elena Camerin def. (Slovenia) Tadeja Majerič / (Romania) Andreea Mitu 6–3, 2–6, [10–8]
