= 2016 ITF Women's Circuit (October–December) =

The 2016 ITF Women's Circuit is the 2016 edition of the second-tier tour for women's professional tennis. It is organised by the International Tennis Federation and is a tier below the WTA Tour. The ITF Women's Circuit includes tournaments with prize money ranging from $10,000 up to $100,000.

== Key ==
Category
$100,000 tournaments
$75,000 tournaments
$50,000 tournaments
$25,000 tournaments
$10,000 tournaments

== Month ==
=== October ===
Week of	Tournament	Winner	Runners-up	Semifinalists	Quarterfinalists
October 3	Toowoomba, Australia; Hard $25,000; Singles and Doubles draws	(Hungary) Dalma Gálfi; 6–2, 6–4	(United Kingdom) Katy Dunne	(Israel) Julia Glushko (United States) Asia Muhammad	(Australia) Arina Rodionova (Slovakia) Viktória Kužmová (Japan) Miyu Kato (United States) Jennifer Elie
October 3	Toowoomba, Australia; Hard $25,000; Singles and Doubles draws	(Hungary) Dalma Gálfi (Slovakia) Viktória Kužmová; 6–4, 7–6^{(7–4)}	(Brazil) Gabriela Cé (Slovakia) Tereza Mihalíková	(Israel) Julia Glushko (United States) Asia Muhammad	(Australia) Arina Rodionova (Slovakia) Viktória Kužmová (Japan) Miyu Kato (United States) Jennifer Elie
October 3	Pula, Italy; Clay $25,000; Singles and Doubles draws	(Italy) Martina Trevisan; 6–3, 6–4	(Brazil) Beatriz Haddad Maia	(United Kingdom) Amanda Carreras (Belgium) Elyne Boeykens	(Italy) Jasmine Paolini (Slovenia) Tamara Zidanšek (Romania) Nicoleta Dascălu (Chile) Daniela Seguel
October 3	Pula, Italy; Clay $25,000; Singles and Doubles draws	(Switzerland) Jil Teichmann (Slovenia) Tamara Zidanšek; 6–2, 6–4	(Italy) Claudia Giovine (Italy) Camilla Rosatello	(United Kingdom) Amanda Carreras (Belgium) Elyne Boeykens	(Italy) Jasmine Paolini (Slovenia) Tamara Zidanšek (Romania) Nicoleta Dascălu (Chile) Daniela Seguel
October 3	Redding, United States; Hard $25,000; Singles and Doubles draws	(Canada) Françoise Abanda; 3–6, 6–4, 6–4	(United States) Sachia Vickery	(United Kingdom) Katie Boulter (United States) Bernarda Pera	(United States) Danielle Collins (Bulgaria) Sesil Karatantcheva (Germany) Laura Schaeder (United States) Julia Elbaba
October 3	Redding, United States; Hard $25,000; Singles and Doubles draws	(Bosnia and Herzegovina) Ema Burgić Bucko (United States) Sabrina Santamaria; 6–3, 7–6^{(7–4)}	(United States) Julia Elbaba (United States) Bernarda Pera	(United Kingdom) Katie Boulter (United States) Bernarda Pera	(United States) Danielle Collins (Bulgaria) Sesil Karatantcheva (Germany) Laura Schaeder (United States) Julia Elbaba
October 3	Sozopol, Bulgaria; Hard $10,000; Singles and Doubles draws	(Romania) Oana Gavrilă; 6–3, 6–4	(Romania) Andreea Roșca	(Romania) Ioana Mincă (Bulgaria) Petia Arshinkova	(Turkey) İlay Yörük (Germany) Luisa Marie Huber (Belgium) Michaela Boev (Greece) Despina Papamichail
October 3	Sozopol, Bulgaria; Hard $10,000; Singles and Doubles draws	(Romania) Oana Gavrilă (Romania) Andreea Roșca; 6–4, 6–3	(Czech Republic) Kateřina Kramperová (Russia) Angelina Zhuravleva	(Romania) Ioana Mincă (Bulgaria) Petia Arshinkova	(Turkey) İlay Yörük (Germany) Luisa Marie Huber (Belgium) Michaela Boev (Greece) Despina Papamichail
October 3	Bol, Croatia; Clay $10,000; Singles and Doubles draws	(Czech Republic) Gabriela Pantůčková; 6–0, 6–3	(Slovenia) Nina Potočnik	(France) Sara Cakarevic (Croatia) Tena Lukas	(Croatia) Anđa Karanušić (Croatia) Mariana Dražić (Slovakia) Lenka Juríková (Croatia) Iva Primorac
October 3	Bol, Croatia; Clay $10,000; Singles and Doubles draws	(Croatia) Tena Lukas (Croatia) Iva Primorac; 6–3, 6–4	(Slovenia) Nina Potočnik (Hungary) Rebeka Stolmár	(France) Sara Cakarevic (Croatia) Tena Lukas	(Croatia) Anđa Karanušić (Croatia) Mariana Dražić (Slovakia) Lenka Juríková (Croatia) Iva Primorac
October 3	Sharm el-Sheikh, Egypt; Hard $10,000; Singles and Doubles draws	(Bosnia and Herzegovina) Dea Herdželaš; 6–1, 7–6^{(7–5)}	(Russia) Anna Morgina	(Ukraine) Alona Fomina (Republic of Ireland) Jenny Claffey	(Sweden) Jacqueline Cabaj Awad (Greece) Eleni Kordolaimi (Egypt) Ola Abou Zekry (Romania) Jaqueline Cristian
October 3	Sharm el-Sheikh, Egypt; Hard $10,000; Singles and Doubles draws	(Sweden) Jacqueline Cabaj Awad (Romania) Jaqueline Cristian; 6–3, 7–5	(Ukraine) Alona Fomina (Russia) Anna Morgina	(Ukraine) Alona Fomina (Republic of Ireland) Jenny Claffey	(Sweden) Jacqueline Cabaj Awad (Greece) Eleni Kordolaimi (Egypt) Ola Abou Zekry (Romania) Jaqueline Cristian
October 3	Tarakan, Indonesia; Hard (indoor) $10,000; Singles and Doubles draws	(United States) Kaitlyn Christian; 5–7, 6–3, 6–2	(Japan) Haruka Kaji	(Indonesia) Beatrice Gumulya (India) Kanika Vaidya	(China) Wang Danni (Indonesia) Jessy Rompies (China) Meng Ran (Japan) Yukina Saigo
October 3	Tarakan, Indonesia; Hard (indoor) $10,000; Singles and Doubles draws	(Indonesia) Beatrice Gumulya (Indonesia) Jessy Rompies; 6–3, 6–1	(India) Kanika Vaidya (China) Wang Danni	(Indonesia) Beatrice Gumulya (India) Kanika Vaidya	(China) Wang Danni (Indonesia) Jessy Rompies (China) Meng Ran (Japan) Yukina Saigo
October 3	Ramat HaSharon, Israel; Hard $10,000; Singles and Doubles draws	(Russia) Marta Paigina; 6–1, 6–4	(Israel) Vlada Ekshibarova	(Turkey) Melis Sezer (Israel) Noya Ohana	(Israel) Lina Glushko (United Kingdom) Laura Deigman (Ukraine) Oleksandra Piskun (Israel) Ofri Lankri
October 3	Ramat HaSharon, Israel; Hard $10,000; Singles and Doubles draws	(Israel) Shelly Krolitzky (Israel) Maya Tahan; 6–4, 4–6, [10–8]	(Sweden) Linnéa Malmqvist (Belarus) Anastasiya Shleptsova	(Turkey) Melis Sezer (Israel) Noya Ohana	(Israel) Lina Glushko (United Kingdom) Laura Deigman (Ukraine) Oleksandra Piskun (Israel) Ofri Lankri
October 3	Shymkent, Kazakhstan; Clay $10,000; Singles and Doubles draws	(Kazakhstan) Kamila Kerimbayeva; 6–0, 6–4	(Kazakhstan) Gozal Ainitdinova	(Ukraine) Kateryna Sliusar (Russia) Daria Lodikova	(Uzbekistan) Arina Folts (Kazakhstan) Alexandra Grinchishina (Kyrgyzstan) Ksenia Palkina Ulukan (Russia) Yana Sizikova
October 3	Shymkent, Kazakhstan; Clay $10,000; Singles and Doubles draws	(Kazakhstan) Kamila Kerimbayeva (Russia) Yana Sizikova; 6–2, 6–3	(Russia) Anna Pribylova (Germany) Julyette Steur	(Ukraine) Kateryna Sliusar (Russia) Daria Lodikova	(Uzbekistan) Arina Folts (Kazakhstan) Alexandra Grinchishina (Kyrgyzstan) Ksenia Palkina Ulukan (Russia) Yana Sizikova
October 3	Mexico City, Mexico; Hard $10,000; Singles and Doubles draws	(United States) Emina Bektas; 6–3, 6–1	(Mexico) Victoria Rodríguez	(Mexico) Sabastiani León (Mexico) Marcela Zacarías	(Colombia) María Paulina Pérez (Hungary) Naomi Totka (Mexico) Andrea Renee Villarreal (United States) Stephanie Nemtsova
October 3	Mexico City, Mexico; Hard $10,000; Singles and Doubles draws	(United States) Emina Bektas (United States) Jessica Wacnik; 6–3, 6–4	(Mexico) Alexia Coutino Castillo (Mexico) Victoria Rodríguez	(Mexico) Sabastiani León (Mexico) Marcela Zacarías	(Colombia) María Paulina Pérez (Hungary) Naomi Totka (Mexico) Andrea Renee Villarreal (United States) Stephanie Nemtsova
October 3	Chișinău, Moldova; Clay $10,000; Singles and Doubles draws	(Romania) Ilona Georgiana Ghioroaie; 6–3, 6–0	(Moldova) Adriana Sosnovschi	(Moldova) Alexandra Perper (Serbia) Tamara Čurović	(Ukraine) Yuliia Starodubtseva (Ukraine) Helen Ploskina (Ukraine) Veronika Kapshay (France) Estelle Cascino
October 3	Chișinău, Moldova; Clay $10,000; Singles and Doubles draws	(Ukraine) Veronika Kapshay (Ukraine) Angelina Shakhraychuk; 6–3, 3–6, [10–4]	(France) Estelle Cascino (India) Kyra Shroff	(Moldova) Alexandra Perper (Serbia) Tamara Čurović	(Ukraine) Yuliia Starodubtseva (Ukraine) Helen Ploskina (Ukraine) Veronika Kapshay (France) Estelle Cascino
October 3	Porto, Portugal; Clay $10,000; Singles and Doubles draws	(Switzerland) Nina Stadler; 2–6, 6–2, 6–3	(Portugal) Inês Murta	(Germany) Dana Kremer (Romania) Daiana Negreanu	(Germany) Sina Haas (Spain) Cristina Bucșa (Spain) María Martínez Martínez (Spain) Alicia Herrero Liñana
October 3	Porto, Portugal; Clay $10,000; Singles and Doubles draws	(Chinese Taipei) Hsieh Shu-ying (Chinese Taipei) Hsieh Su-wei; 6–3, 6–4	(Portugal) Francisca Jorge (Portugal) Rita Vilaça	(Germany) Dana Kremer (Romania) Daiana Negreanu	(Germany) Sina Haas (Spain) Cristina Bucșa (Spain) María Martínez Martínez (Spain) Alicia Herrero Liñana
October 3	Telde, Spain; Clay $10,000; Singles and Doubles draws	(Italy) Giulia Gatto-Monticone; 2–6, 6–1, 6–3	(Switzerland) Leonie Küng	(France) Jade Suvrijn (Belgium) Catherine Chantraine	(Switzerland) Lara Michel (Germany) Vivian Wolff (Argentina) Martina Capurro Taborda (Spain) Marta Pérez Mur
October 3	Telde, Spain; Clay $10,000; Singles and Doubles draws	(Spain) Lucía de la Puerta Uribe (Spain) Guiomar Maristany; 7–5, 6–4	(Switzerland) Leonie Küng (Germany) Vivian Wolff	(France) Jade Suvrijn (Belgium) Catherine Chantraine	(Switzerland) Lara Michel (Germany) Vivian Wolff (Argentina) Martina Capurro Taborda (Spain) Marta Pérez Mur
October 3	Hua Hin, Thailand; Hard $10,000; Singles and Doubles draws	(China) Guo Hanyu; 6–3, 6–3	(India) Karman Thandi	(Thailand) Kamonwan Buayam (China) Kang Jiaqi	(Thailand) Plobrung Plipuech (Japan) Aki Yamasoto (China) Li Yixuan (Chinese Taipei) Cho I-hsuan
October 3	Hua Hin, Thailand; Hard $10,000; Singles and Doubles draws	(Chinese Taipei) Cho I-hsuan (China) Zhang Yukun; 2–6, 6–3, [10–7]	(Thailand) Kamonwan Buayam (Chinese Taipei) Lee Pei-chi	(Thailand) Kamonwan Buayam (China) Kang Jiaqi	(Thailand) Plobrung Plipuech (Japan) Aki Yamasoto (China) Li Yixuan (Chinese Taipei) Cho I-hsuan
October 3	Hammamet, Tunisia; Clay $10,000; Singles and Doubles draws	(Germany) Katharina Hobgarski; 6–4, 6–2	(Slovakia) Barbara Kötelesová	(Argentina) Guillermina Naya (Austria) Pia König	(Brazil) Carolina Alves (United States) Miranda Ramirez (France) Clara Burel (Italy) Francesca Sella
October 3	Hammamet, Tunisia; Clay $10,000; Singles and Doubles draws	(France) Alice Bacquié (Austria) Pia König; 6–4, 6–1	(Chile) Fernanda Brito (Bolivia) Noelia Zeballos	(Argentina) Guillermina Naya (Austria) Pia König	(Brazil) Carolina Alves (United States) Miranda Ramirez (France) Clara Burel (Italy) Francesca Sella
October 3	Hilton Head Island, United States; Clay $10,000; Singles and Doubles draws	Singles and doubles competition not completed due to Hurricane Matthew			
October 10	Cairns, Australia; Hard $25,000; Singles and Doubles draws	(Australia) Olivia Rogowska; 6–1, 7–5	(Slovakia) Viktória Kužmová	(Japan) Miyu Kato (Papua New Guinea) Abigail Tere-Apisah	(United States) Asia Muhammad (Poland) Sandra Zaniewska (Australia) Maddison Inglis (Australia) Lizette Cabrera
October 10	Cairns, Australia; Hard $25,000; Singles and Doubles draws	(Australia) Alison Bai (Australia) Lizette Cabrera; 7–5, 5–7, [12–10]	(Poland) Katarzyna Kawa (Poland) Sandra Zaniewska	(Japan) Miyu Kato (Papua New Guinea) Abigail Tere-Apisah	(United States) Asia Muhammad (Poland) Sandra Zaniewska (Australia) Maddison Inglis (Australia) Lizette Cabrera
October 10	Équeurdreville-Hainneville, France; Hard (indoor) $25,000; Singles and Doubles draws	(Netherlands) Arantxa Rus; 6–2, 6–1	(Belgium) Maryna Zanevska	(Serbia) Ivana Jorović (France) Amandine Hesse	(Belgium) An-Sophie Mestach (Netherlands) Lesley Kerkhove (Ukraine) Olga Fridman (Netherlands) Quirine Lemoine
October 10	Équeurdreville-Hainneville, France; Hard (indoor) $25,000; Singles and Doubles draws	(Sweden) Cornelia Lister (Russia) Polina Monova; 7–5, 4–6, [10–6]	(France) Amandine Hesse (Belgium) An-Sophie Mestach	(Serbia) Ivana Jorović (France) Amandine Hesse	(Belgium) An-Sophie Mestach (Netherlands) Lesley Kerkhove (Ukraine) Olga Fridman (Netherlands) Quirine Lemoine
October 10	Pula, Italy; Clay $25,000; Singles and Doubles draws	(Croatia) Tereza Mrdeža; 6–3, 6–4	(Netherlands) Cindy Burger	(Russia) Anastasiya Komardina (Romania) Irina Maria Bara	(Czech Republic) Barbora Krejčíková (Slovenia) Tamara Zidanšek (North Macedonia) Lina Gjorcheska (Chile) Daniela Seguel
October 10	Pula, Italy; Clay $25,000; Singles and Doubles draws	(Italy) Camilla Rosatello (Liechtenstein) Kathinka von Deichmann; 6–1, 3–6, [10–6]	(Italy) Cristiana Ferrando (Slovakia) Vivien Juhászová	(Russia) Anastasiya Komardina (Romania) Irina Maria Bara	(Czech Republic) Barbora Krejčíková (Slovenia) Tamara Zidanšek (North Macedonia) Lina Gjorcheska (Chile) Daniela Seguel
October 10	Makinohara, Japan; Carpet $25,000; Singles and Doubles draws	(Russia) Ksenia Lykina; 6–3, 6–3	(Japan) Riko Sawayanagi	(Japan) Haruna Arakawa (Japan) Momoko Kobori	(Chinese Taipei) Hsu Ching-wen (Japan) Ayano Shimizu (Japan) Junri Namigata (Japan) Chihiro Muramatsu
October 10	Makinohara, Japan; Carpet $25,000; Singles and Doubles draws	(Russia) Ksenia Lykina (Japan) Riko Sawayanagi; 6–4, 6–1	(Japan) Rika Fujiwara (Japan) Erika Sema	(Japan) Haruna Arakawa (Japan) Momoko Kobori	(Chinese Taipei) Hsu Ching-wen (Japan) Ayano Shimizu (Japan) Junri Namigata (Japan) Chihiro Muramatsu
October 10	Lagos, Nigeria; Hard $25,000; Singles and Doubles draws	(Slovenia) Tadeja Majerič; 3–6, 6–1, 6–1	(Switzerland) Conny Perrin	(Bulgaria) Julia Terziyska (Israel) Deniz Khazaniuk	(Greece) Valentini Grammatikopoulou (France) Harmony Tan (Serbia) Draginja Vuković (Oman) Fatma Al-Nabhani
October 10	Lagos, Nigeria; Hard $25,000; Singles and Doubles draws	(Netherlands) Chayenne Ewijk (Netherlands) Rosalie van der Hoek; 6–3, 7–5	(Greece) Valentini Grammatikopoulou (India) Prarthana Thombare	(Bulgaria) Julia Terziyska (Israel) Deniz Khazaniuk	(Greece) Valentini Grammatikopoulou (France) Harmony Tan (Serbia) Draginja Vuković (Oman) Fatma Al-Nabhani
October 10	Bol, Croatia; Clay $10,000; Singles and Doubles draws	(Slovenia) Kaja Juvan; 6–3, 6–1	(Croatia) Tena Lukas	(Czech Republic) Gabriela Pantůčková (Hungary) Anna Bondár	(Croatia) Iva Primorac (Croatia) Lea Bošković (Romania) Cristina Ene (Belgium) Magali Kempen
October 10	Bol, Croatia; Clay $10,000; Singles and Doubles draws	(Croatia) Mariana Dražić (Hungary) Rebeka Stolmár; 7–6^{(7–5)}, 7–6^{(7–5)}	(Croatia) Lea Bošković (Norway) Malene Helgø	(Czech Republic) Gabriela Pantůčková (Hungary) Anna Bondár	(Croatia) Iva Primorac (Croatia) Lea Bošković (Romania) Cristina Ene (Belgium) Magali Kempen
October 10	Sharm el-Sheikh, Egypt; Hard $10,000; Singles and Doubles draws	(Germany) Sarah-Rebecca Sekulic; 3–6, 6–4, 6–3	(Egypt) Sandra Samir	(Ukraine) Alona Fomina (Serbia) Barbara Bonić	(Russia) Anatasia Pribylova (Romania) Jaqueline Cristian (Ukraine) Marta Kostyuk (Georgia (country)) Mariam Bolkvadze
October 10	Sharm el-Sheikh, Egypt; Hard $10,000; Singles and Doubles draws	(Georgia (country)) Mariam Bolkvadze (Ukraine) Alona Fomina; 6–2, 6–3	(Argentina) Guadalupe Pérez Rojas (Switzerland) Jil Teichmann	(Ukraine) Alona Fomina (Serbia) Barbara Bonić	(Russia) Anatasia Pribylova (Romania) Jaqueline Cristian (Ukraine) Marta Kostyuk (Georgia (country)) Mariam Bolkvadze
October 10	Jakarta, Indonesia; Hard $10,000; Singles and Doubles draws	(Singapore) Stefanie Tan; 6–4, 6–4	(Indonesia) Jessy Rompies	(Indonesia) Lavinia Tananta (Indonesia) Beatrice Gumulya	(Indonesia) Rifanty Kahfiani (Indonesia) Deria Nur Haliza (Japan) Yukina Saigo (Japan) Haruka Kaji
October 10	Jakarta, Indonesia; Hard $10,000; Singles and Doubles draws	(Indonesia) Beatrice Gumulya (Indonesia) Jessy Rompies; 6–0, 6–2	(Chinese Taipei) Chien Pei-ju (Japan) Tomoko Dokei	(Indonesia) Lavinia Tananta (Indonesia) Beatrice Gumulya	(Indonesia) Rifanty Kahfiani (Indonesia) Deria Nur Haliza (Japan) Yukina Saigo (Japan) Haruka Kaji
October 10	Hua Hin, Thailand; Hard $10,000; Singles and Doubles draws	(China) Li Yixuan; 2–6, 6–4, 6–3	(Philippines) Katharina Lehnert	(Thailand) Nudnida Luangnam (China) Guo Hanyu	(Slovakia) Viktória Morvayová (Thailand) Bunyawi Thamchaiwat (Japan) Aki Yamasoto (Serbia) Natalija Kostić
October 10	Hua Hin, Thailand; Hard $10,000; Singles and Doubles draws	(Thailand) Nudnida Luangnam (China) Zhang Yukun; 6–2, 6–3	(China) Guo Hanyu (China) Lu Jiaxi	(Thailand) Nudnida Luangnam (China) Guo Hanyu	(Slovakia) Viktória Morvayová (Thailand) Bunyawi Thamchaiwat (Japan) Aki Yamasoto (Serbia) Natalija Kostić
October 10	Hammamet, Tunisia; Clay $10,000; Singles and Doubles draws	(Chile) Fernanda Brito; 6–3, 7–5	(France) Marie Témin	(Slovakia) Barbara Kötelesová (Italy) Miriana Tona	(Italy) Anna Procacci (France) Alice Bacquié (Italy) Verena Hofer (Russia) Yulia Kulikova
October 10	Hammamet, Tunisia; Clay $10,000; Singles and Doubles draws	(France) Joséphine Boualem (France) Marie Témin; 6–2, 6–4	(Portugal) Inês Murta (Italy) Federica Prati	(Slovakia) Barbara Kötelesová (Italy) Miriana Tona	(Italy) Anna Procacci (France) Alice Bacquié (Italy) Verena Hofer (Russia) Yulia Kulikova
October 10	Antalya, Turkey; Clay $10,000; Singles and Doubles draws	(Turkey) Ayla Aksu; 6–4, 2–6, 7–5	(Hungary) Ágnes Bukta	(Germany) Lisa-Marie Mätschke (Romania) Cristina Adamescu	(Belarus) Sadafmoh Tolibova (Bulgaria) Julia Stamatova (Turkey) İpek Oz (Switzerland) Chiara Frapolli
October 10	Antalya, Turkey; Clay $10,000; Singles and Doubles draws	(Turkey) Berfu Cengiz (Bulgaria) Ani Vangelova; 6–3, 6–4	(Romania) Cristina Adamescu (Belarus) Sadafmoh Tolibova	(Germany) Lisa-Marie Mätschke (Romania) Cristina Adamescu	(Belarus) Sadafmoh Tolibova (Bulgaria) Julia Stamatova (Turkey) İpek Oz (Switzerland) Chiara Frapolli
October 17	Soho Square Ladies Tournament; Sharm el-Sheikh, Egypt; Hard $100,000; Singles – Doubles	(Croatia) Donna Vekić; 6–2, 6–7^{(7–9)}, 6–3	(Spain) Sara Sorribes Tormo	(Russia) Anastasiya Komardina (Greece) Maria Sakkari	(Ukraine) Dayana Yastremska (North Macedonia) Lina Gjorcheska (Netherlands) Arantxa Rus (Czech Republic) Karolína Muchová
October 17	Soho Square Ladies Tournament; Sharm el-Sheikh, Egypt; Hard $100,000; Singles – Doubles	(Romania) Irina Maria Bara (Ukraine) Alona Fomina; 6–2, 6–1	(Argentina) Guadalupe Pérez Rojas (Switzerland) Jil Teichmann	(Russia) Anastasiya Komardina (Greece) Maria Sakkari	(Ukraine) Dayana Yastremska (North Macedonia) Lina Gjorcheska (Netherlands) Arantxa Rus (Czech Republic) Karolína Muchová
October 17	Challenger Banque Nationale de Saguenay; Saguenay, Canada; Hard (indoor) $50,000; Singles – Doubles	(United States) Catherine Bellis; 6–4, 6–2	(Canada) Bianca Andreescu	(United States) Sachia Vickery (United States) Jennifer Brady	(Canada) Aleksandra Wozniak (United States) Maria Sanchez (United Kingdom) Harriet Dart (Canada) Charlotte Robillard-Millette
October 17	Challenger Banque Nationale de Saguenay; Saguenay, Canada; Hard (indoor) $50,000; Singles – Doubles	(Romania) Elena Bogdan (Romania) Mihaela Buzărnescu; 6–4, 6–7^{(4–7)}, [10–6]	(Canada) Bianca Andreescu (Canada) Charlotte Robillard-Millette	(United States) Sachia Vickery (United States) Jennifer Brady	(Canada) Aleksandra Wozniak (United States) Maria Sanchez (United Kingdom) Harriet Dart (Canada) Charlotte Robillard-Millette
October 17	Suzhou Ladies Open; Suzhou, China; Hard $50,000; Singles – Doubles	(Chinese Taipei) Chang Kai-chen; 4–6, 6–2, 6–1	(China) Wang Yafan	(Poland) Katarzyna Piter (China) Xu Yifan	(Japan) Hiroko Kuwata (Chinese Taipei) Lee Ya-hsuan (China) Liu Chang (Germany) Tatjana Maria
October 17	Suzhou Ladies Open; Suzhou, China; Hard $50,000; Singles – Doubles	(Japan) Hiroko Kuwata (Japan) Akiko Omae; 6–1, 6–3	(United States) Jacqueline Cako (Uzbekistan) Sabina Sharipova	(Poland) Katarzyna Piter (China) Xu Yifan	(Japan) Hiroko Kuwata (Chinese Taipei) Lee Ya-hsuan (China) Liu Chang (Germany) Tatjana Maria
October 17	Open Engie de Touraine; Joué-lès-Tours, France; Hard (indoor) $50,000; Singles – Doubles	(Belgium) Maryna Zanevska; 6–3, 6–3	(Romania) Elena Gabriela Ruse	(Latvia) Diāna Marcinkēviča (Netherlands) Lesley Kerkhove	(Belarus) Vera Lapko (France) Chloé Paquet (Chile) Daniela Seguel (Tunisia) Ons Jabeur
October 17	Open Engie de Touraine; Joué-lès-Tours, France; Hard (indoor) $50,000; Singles – Doubles	(Serbia) Ivana Jorović (Netherlands) Lesley Kerkhove; 6–3, 7–5	(Romania) Alexandra Cadanțu (Russia) Ekaterina Yashina	(Latvia) Diāna Marcinkēviča (Netherlands) Lesley Kerkhove	(Belarus) Vera Lapko (France) Chloé Paquet (Chile) Daniela Seguel (Tunisia) Ons Jabeur
October 17	Hamamatsu, Japan; Carpet $25,000; Singles and Doubles draws	(Japan) Shuko Aoyama; 6–4, 6–4	(Russia) Ksenia Lykina	(Japan) Haruna Arakawa (Japan) Riko Sawayanagi	(Japan) Risa Ushijima (Japan) Miharu Imanishi (Poland) Magdalena Fręch (United States) Tori Kinard
October 17	Hamamatsu, Japan; Carpet $25,000; Singles and Doubles draws	(Croatia) Jana Fett (Japan) Ayaka Okuno; 4–6, 7–6^{(7–5)}, [12–10]	(Chinese Taipei) Hsu Chieh-yu (Poland) Justyna Jegiołka	(Japan) Haruna Arakawa (Japan) Riko Sawayanagi	(Japan) Risa Ushijima (Japan) Miharu Imanishi (Poland) Magdalena Fręch (United States) Tori Kinard
October 17	Lagos, Nigeria; Hard $25,000; Singles and Doubles draws	(Switzerland) Conny Perrin; 6–3, 6–3	(Slovenia) Tadeja Majerič	(Greece) Valentini Grammatikopoulou (Bulgaria) Julia Terziyska	(Israel) Deniz Khazaniuk (France) Tessah Andrianjafitrimo (Ukraine) Valeriya Strakhova (Oman) Fatma Al-Nabhani
October 17	Lagos, Nigeria; Hard $25,000; Singles and Doubles draws	(Greece) Valentini Grammatikopoulou (India) Prarthana Thombare; 6–7^{(3–7)}, 6–3, [11–9]	(India) Kyra Shroff (India) Dhruthi Tatachar Venugopal	(Greece) Valentini Grammatikopoulou (Bulgaria) Julia Terziyska	(Israel) Deniz Khazaniuk (France) Tessah Andrianjafitrimo (Ukraine) Valeriya Strakhova (Oman) Fatma Al-Nabhani
October 17	Bol, Croatia; Clay $10,000; Singles and Doubles draws	(Czech Republic) Gabriela Pantůčková; 6–3, 6–2	(Croatia) Ani Mijačika	(Slovenia) Kaja Juvan (Norway) Malene Helgø	(Czech Republic) Vendula Žovincová (Croatia) Mariana Dražić (Croatia) Lea Bošković (Canada) Petra Januskova
October 17	Bol, Croatia; Clay $10,000; Singles and Doubles draws	(Croatia) Lea Bošković (Slovenia) Kaja Juvan; 4–6, 7–5, [10–4]	(Croatia) Mariana Dražić (Croatia) Ani Mijačika	(Slovenia) Kaja Juvan (Norway) Malene Helgø	(Czech Republic) Vendula Žovincová (Croatia) Mariana Dražić (Croatia) Lea Bošković (Canada) Petra Januskova
October 17	Ismaning Open; Ismaning, Germany; Carpet (indoor) $10,000; Singles and Doubles draws	(Ukraine) Anastasia Zarytska; 6–2, 7–6^{(8–6)}	(Switzerland) Tess Sugnaux	(Germany) Julia Kimmelmann (Romania) Laura-Ioana Andrei	(Germany) Linda Prenkovic (Czech Republic) Miriam Kolodziejová (Belgium) Klaartje Liebens (Germany) Lena Rüffer
October 17	Ismaning Open; Ismaning, Germany; Carpet (indoor) $10,000; Singles and Doubles draws	(Germany) Julia Kimmelmann (Germany) Franziska Kommer; 3–6, 6–3, [10–8]	(Switzerland) Tamara Arnold (Germany) Caroline Werner	(Germany) Julia Kimmelmann (Romania) Laura-Ioana Andrei	(Germany) Linda Prenkovic (Czech Republic) Miriam Kolodziejová (Belgium) Klaartje Liebens (Germany) Lena Rüffer
October 17	Pula, Italy; Clay $10,000; Singles and Doubles draws	(Hungary) Vanda Lukács; 0–6, 6–1, 6–2	(Ukraine) Katarina Zavatska	(Switzerland) Ylena In-Albon (Belgium) Déborah Kerfs	(Italy) Martina Spigarelli (United States) Elyse Lavender (Italy) Alice Balducci (Italy) Lucrezia Stefanini
October 17	Pula, Italy; Clay $10,000; Singles and Doubles draws	(Italy) Federica Bilardo (Italy) Tatiana Pieri; 6–4, 7–5	(Switzerland) Ylena In-Albon (Italy) Giorgia Marchetti	(Switzerland) Ylena In-Albon (Belgium) Déborah Kerfs	(Italy) Martina Spigarelli (United States) Elyse Lavender (Italy) Alice Balducci (Italy) Lucrezia Stefanini
October 17	Hua Hin, Thailand; Hard $10,000; Singles and Doubles draws	(Thailand) Bunyawi Thamchaiwat; 6–1, 6–3	(Serbia) Natalija Kostić	(Thailand) Varunya Wongteanchai (Thailand) Plobrung Plipuech	(Hong Kong) Ng Kwan-yau (Thailand) Patcharin Cheapchandej (Thailand) Tamachan Momkoonthod (China) Zhao Di
October 17	Hua Hin, Thailand; Hard $10,000; Singles and Doubles draws	(Thailand) Nudnida Luangnam (Thailand) Varunya Wongteanchai; 6–2, 6–7^{(2–7)}, [10–0]	(Thailand) Chompoothip Jandakate (Thailand) Tamachan Momkoonthod	(Thailand) Varunya Wongteanchai (Thailand) Plobrung Plipuech	(Hong Kong) Ng Kwan-yau (Thailand) Patcharin Cheapchandej (Thailand) Tamachan Momkoonthod (China) Zhao Di
October 17	Hammamet, Tunisia; Clay $10,000; Singles and Doubles draws	(Tunisia) Chiraz Bechri; 4–0, ret.	(France) Jade Suvrijn	(Romania) Irina Fetecău (Bolivia) Noelia Zeballos	(France) Joséphine Boualem (Czech Republic) Gabriela Horáčková (Brazil) Carolina Alves (Ukraine) Oleksandra Korashvili
October 17	Hammamet, Tunisia; Clay $10,000; Singles and Doubles draws	(Italy) Verena Hofer (Italy) Sara Marcionni; 6–3, 7–6^{(7–5)}	(France) Joséphine Boualem (Russia) Ksenija Sharifova	(Romania) Irina Fetecău (Bolivia) Noelia Zeballos	(France) Joséphine Boualem (Czech Republic) Gabriela Horáčková (Brazil) Carolina Alves (Ukraine) Oleksandra Korashvili
October 17	Antalya, Turkey; Clay $10,000; Singles and Doubles draws	(Turkey) Ayla Aksu; 7–5, 6–2	(Hungary) Ágnes Bukta	(Australia) Nina Alibalić (Germany) Dana Kremer	(Russia) Ulyana Ayzatulina (Turkey) Berfu Cengiz (Romania) Diana Enache (Georgia (country)) Sofia Kvatsabaia
October 17	Antalya, Turkey; Clay $10,000; Singles and Doubles draws	(Hungary) Ágnes Bukta (Romania) Diana Enache; 6–4, 6–1	(Russia) Ulyana Ayzatulina (Ukraine) Anastasiya Poplavska	(Australia) Nina Alibalić (Germany) Dana Kremer	(Russia) Ulyana Ayzatulina (Turkey) Berfu Cengiz (Romania) Diana Enache (Georgia (country)) Sofia Kvatsabaia
October 24	Internationaux Féminins de la Vienne; Poitiers, France; Hard (indoor) $100,000; Singles – Doubles	(France) Océane Dodin; 6–4, 6–2	(United States) Lauren Davis	(Belgium) Alison Van Uytvanck (France) Pauline Parmentier	(Romania) Monica Niculescu (Estonia) Anett Kontaveit (Russia) Ekaterina Alexandrova (Romania) Elena Gabriela Ruse
October 24	Internationaux Féminins de la Vienne; Poitiers, France; Hard (indoor) $100,000; Singles – Doubles	(Japan) Nao Hibino (Poland) Alicja Rosolska; 6–0, 6–0	(Romania) Alexandra Cadanțu (Germany) Nicola Geuer	(Belgium) Alison Van Uytvanck (France) Pauline Parmentier	(Romania) Monica Niculescu (Estonia) Anett Kontaveit (Russia) Ekaterina Alexandrova (Romania) Elena Gabriela Ruse
October 24	Bendigo Women's International; Bendigo, Australia; Hard $50,000; Singles – Doubles	(Japan) Risa Ozaki; 6–3, 6–3	(United States) Asia Muhammad	(Papua New Guinea) Abigail Tere-Apisah (Thailand) Varatchaya Wongteanchai	(Australia) Lizette Cabrera (Australia) Naiktha Bains (United Kingdom) Katy Dunne (Australia) Tammi Patterson
October 24	Bendigo Women's International; Bendigo, Australia; Hard $50,000; Singles – Doubles	(United States) Asia Muhammad (Australia) Arina Rodionova; 6–4, 6–3	(Japan) Shuko Aoyama (Japan) Risa Ozaki	(Papua New Guinea) Abigail Tere-Apisah (Thailand) Varatchaya Wongteanchai	(Australia) Lizette Cabrera (Australia) Naiktha Bains (United Kingdom) Katy Dunne (Australia) Tammi Patterson
October 24	Bank of Liuzhou Cup; Liuzhou, China; Hard $50,000; Singles – Doubles	(Serbia) Nina Stojanović; 6–3, 6–4	(South Korea) Jang Su-jeong	(China) Wang Yafan (Turkey) İpek Soylu	(China) Duan Yingying (Uzbekistan) Sabina Sharipova (China) Zhu Lin (Chinese Taipei) Chang Kai-chen
October 24	Bank of Liuzhou Cup; Liuzhou, China; Hard $50,000; Singles – Doubles	(Russia) Veronika Kudermetova (Russia) Aleksandra Pospelova; 6–2, 6–4	(United States) Jacqueline Cako (Uzbekistan) Sabina Sharipova	(China) Wang Yafan (Turkey) İpek Soylu	(China) Duan Yingying (Uzbekistan) Sabina Sharipova (China) Zhu Lin (Chinese Taipei) Chang Kai-chen
October 24	Abierto Tampico; Tampico, Mexico; Hard $50,000+H; Singles – Doubles	(Russia) Sofya Zhuk; 6–4, 6–3	(Russia) Varvara Flink	(Belgium) Elise Mertens (Mexico) Victoria Rodríguez	(United Kingdom) Katie Swan (United States) Usue Maitane Arconada (United Kingdom) Freya Christie (Argentina) Nadia Podoroska
October 24	Abierto Tampico; Tampico, Mexico; Hard $50,000+H; Singles – Doubles	(Romania) Mihaela Buzărnescu (Belgium) Elise Mertens; 6–0, 6–2	(United States) Usue Maitane Arconada (United Kingdom) Katie Swan	(Belgium) Elise Mertens (Mexico) Victoria Rodríguez	(United Kingdom) Katie Swan (United States) Usue Maitane Arconada (United Kingdom) Freya Christie (Argentina) Nadia Podoroska
October 24	Tennis Classic of Macon; Macon, United States; Hard $50,000; Singles – Doubles	(United States) Kayla Day; 6–1, 6–3	(United States) Danielle Collins	(United States) Grace Min (Sweden) Rebecca Peterson	(Bulgaria) Sesil Karatantcheva (United States) Jamie Loeb (France) Alizé Lim (United States) Francesca Di Lorenzo
October 24	Tennis Classic of Macon; Macon, United States; Hard $50,000; Singles – Doubles	(Netherlands) Michaëlla Krajicek (United States) Taylor Townsend; 3–6, 6–2, [10–6]	(United States) Sabrina Santamaria (United States) Keri Wong	(United States) Grace Min (Sweden) Rebecca Peterson	(Bulgaria) Sesil Karatantcheva (United States) Jamie Loeb (France) Alizé Lim (United States) Francesca Di Lorenzo
October 24	Pereira, Colombia; Clay $10,000; Singles and Doubles draws	(Colombia) María Fernanda Herazo; 6–3, 6–2	(Colombia) Emiliana Arango	(Chile) Bárbara Gatica (Paraguay) Camila Giangreco Campiz	(Brazil) Thaísa Grana Pedretti (Russia) Veronica Miroshnichenko (Argentina) Carla Lucero (Argentina) Florencia Molinero
October 24	Pereira, Colombia; Clay $10,000; Singles and Doubles draws	(Chile) Fernanda Brito (Paraguay) Camila Giangreco Campiz; 6–1, 6–2	(Colombia) María Paulina Pérez (Colombia) Paula Andrea Pérez	(Chile) Bárbara Gatica (Paraguay) Camila Giangreco Campiz	(Brazil) Thaísa Grana Pedretti (Russia) Veronica Miroshnichenko (Argentina) Carla Lucero (Argentina) Florencia Molinero
October 24	Sharm el-Sheikh, Egypt; Hard $10,000; Singles and Doubles draws	(Turkey) Pemra Özgen; 6–4, 7–5	(Russia) Anastasia Pribylova	(Egypt) Sandra Samir (Romania) Elena-Teodora Cadar	(China) Wang Danni (Egypt) Ola Abou Zekry (Serbia) Barbara Bonić (Austria) Melanie Klaffner
October 24	Sharm el-Sheikh, Egypt; Hard $10,000; Singles and Doubles draws	(Austria) Melanie Klaffner (Romania) Ana Bianca Mihăilă; 6–4, 6–2	(Egypt) Ola Abou Zekry (Russia) Anastasia Pribylova	(Egypt) Sandra Samir (Romania) Elena-Teodora Cadar	(China) Wang Danni (Egypt) Ola Abou Zekry (Serbia) Barbara Bonić (Austria) Melanie Klaffner
October 24	Heraklion, Greece; Hard $10,000; Singles and Doubles draws	(Russia) Valeria Savinykh; 6–2, 4–1, ret.	(United Kingdom) Gabriella Taylor	(France) Pauline Payet (Romania) Karola Patricia Bejenaru	(Liechtenstein) Kathinka von Deichmann (Romania) Ioana Diana Pietroiu (Moldova) Anastasia Vdovenco (Netherlands) Nina Kruijer
October 24	Heraklion, Greece; Hard $10,000; Singles and Doubles draws	(Netherlands) Nina Kruijer (Netherlands) Suzan Lamens; 6–4, 4–6, [12–10]	(Austria) Mira Antonitsch (Netherlands) Phillis Vanenburg	(France) Pauline Payet (Romania) Karola Patricia Bejenaru	(Liechtenstein) Kathinka von Deichmann (Romania) Ioana Diana Pietroiu (Moldova) Anastasia Vdovenco (Netherlands) Nina Kruijer
October 24	Pune, India; Hard $10,000; Singles and Doubles draws	(India) Sowjanya Bavisetti; 7–5, 6–2	(India) Mihika Yadav	(India) Pranjala Yadlapallli (India) Prarthana Thombare	(India) Riya Bhatia (India) Natasha Palha (India) Sai Samhitha Chamarthi (India) Nidhi Chilumula
October 24	Pune, India; Hard $10,000; Singles and Doubles draws	(India) Sharmada Balu (India) Dhruthi Tatachar Venugopal; 6–4, 6–0	(India) Riya Bhatia (India) Shweta Chandra Rana	(India) Pranjala Yadlapallli (India) Prarthana Thombare	(India) Riya Bhatia (India) Natasha Palha (India) Sai Samhitha Chamarthi (India) Nidhi Chilumula
October 24	Pula, Italy; Clay $10,000; Singles and Doubles draws	(Hungary) Vanda Lukács; 6–1, 6–3	(Belgium) Elyne Boeykens	(Romania) Michele Alexandra Zmău (Italy) Martina Spigarelli	(Italy) Alice Balducci (Bosnia and Herzegovina) Jelena Simić (Italy) Giorgia Marchetti (Italy) Tatiana Pieri
October 24	Pula, Italy; Clay $10,000; Singles and Doubles draws	(Switzerland) Ylena In-Albon (Italy) Giorgia Marchetti; 4–6, 6–2, [10–8]	(Germany) Lisa Ponomar (Romania) Michele Alexandra Zmău	(Romania) Michele Alexandra Zmău (Italy) Martina Spigarelli	(Italy) Alice Balducci (Bosnia and Herzegovina) Jelena Simić (Italy) Giorgia Marchetti (Italy) Tatiana Pieri
October 24	Stockholm, Sweden; Hard (indoor) $10,000; Singles and Doubles draws	(Poland) Iga Świątek; 6–4, 6–3	(Romania) Laura-Ioana Andrei	(Sweden) Jacqueline Cabaj Awad (France) Julie Gervais	(Norway) Astrid Wanja Brune Olsen (Switzerland) Tess Sugnaux (Sweden) Ida Jarlskog (Denmark) Karen Barritza
October 24	Stockholm, Sweden; Hard (indoor) $10,000; Singles and Doubles draws	(Romania) Laura-Ioana Andrei (Germany) Anna Klasen; 6–2, 6–2	(Sweden) Mirjam Björklund (Sweden) Brenda Njuki	(Sweden) Jacqueline Cabaj Awad (France) Julie Gervais	(Norway) Astrid Wanja Brune Olsen (Switzerland) Tess Sugnaux (Sweden) Ida Jarlskog (Denmark) Karen Barritza
October 24	Hammamet, Tunisia; Clay $10,000; Singles and Doubles draws	(Ukraine) Oleksandra Korashvili; 5–7, 6–2, 6–1	(Argentina) Guadalupe Pérez Rojas	(Romania) Irina Fetecău (Slovakia) Barbara Kötelesová	(France) Emmanuelle Girard (Belgium) Catherine Chantraine (Serbia) Tamara Čurović (Czech Republic) Tereza Kolářová
October 24	Hammamet, Tunisia; Clay $10,000; Singles and Doubles draws	(Serbia) Tamara Čurović (Slovakia) Barbara Kötelesová; 3–6, 6–4, [10–3]	(Czech Republic) Tereza Kolářová (Russia) Yulia Kulikova	(Romania) Irina Fetecău (Slovakia) Barbara Kötelesová	(France) Emmanuelle Girard (Belgium) Catherine Chantraine (Serbia) Tamara Čurović (Czech Republic) Tereza Kolářová
October 24	Antalya, Turkey; Clay $10,000; Singles and Doubles draws	(Hungary) Ágnes Bukta; 7–5, 6–1	(Russia) Ulyana Ayzatulina	(Luxembourg) Eléonora Molinaro (Germany) Tayisiya Morderger	(Georgia (country)) Sofia Kvatsabaia (Ukraine) Alona Fomina (Ukraine) Kateryna Sliusar (Uzbekistan) Arina Folts
October 24	Antalya, Turkey; Clay $10,000; Singles and Doubles draws	(Germany) Tayisiya Morderger (Germany) Yana Morderger; 3–6, 7–6^{(7–5)}, [10–6]	(Uzbekistan) Arina Folts (Ukraine) Kateryna Sliusar	(Luxembourg) Eléonora Molinaro (Germany) Tayisiya Morderger	(Georgia (country)) Sofia Kvatsabaia (Ukraine) Alona Fomina (Ukraine) Kateryna Sliusar (Uzbekistan) Arina Folts
October 24	Aegon Pro-Series Loughborough; Loughborough, United Kingdom; Hard (indoor) $10,000; Singles and Doubles draws	(France) Elixane Lechemia; 7–5, 6–1	(Czech Republic) Petra Krejsová	(Netherlands) Bibiane Weijers (Belgium) Kimberley Zimmermann	(Netherlands) Kelly Versteeg (Hong Kong) Zhang Ling (Belarus) Nika Shytkouskaya (Belgium) Klaartje Liebens
October 24	Aegon Pro-Series Loughborough; Loughborough, United Kingdom; Hard (indoor) $10,000; Singles and Doubles draws	(United States) Dasha Ivanova (Czech Republic) Petra Krejsová; 7–6^{(7–2)}, 7–6^{(7–2)}	(United Kingdom) Sarah Beth Grey (United Kingdom) Olivia Nicholls	(Netherlands) Bibiane Weijers (Belgium) Kimberley Zimmermann	(Netherlands) Kelly Versteeg (Hong Kong) Zhang Ling (Belarus) Nika Shytkouskaya (Belgium) Klaartje Liebens
October 31	Canberra Tennis International; Canberra, Australia; Hard $50,000; Singles – Doubles	(Japan) Risa Ozaki; 6–4, 6–4	(Italy) Georgia Brescia	(United States) Jennifer Elie (Croatia) Jana Fett	(Australia) Arina Rodionova (Japan) Eri Hozumi (Japan) Yuuki Tanaka (Australia) Tammi Patterson
October 31	Canberra Tennis International; Canberra, Australia; Hard $50,000; Singles – Doubles	(Australia) Jessica Moore (Australia) Storm Sanders; 6–3, 6–4	(Australia) Alison Bai (Australia) Lizette Cabrera	(United States) Jennifer Elie (Croatia) Jana Fett	(Australia) Arina Rodionova (Japan) Eri Hozumi (Japan) Yuuki Tanaka (Australia) Tammi Patterson
October 31	Tevlin Women's Challenger; Toronto, Canada; Hard (indoor) $50,000; Singles – Doubles	(United States) Catherine Bellis; 6–2, 1–6, 6–3	(Czech Republic) Jesika Malečková	(United States) Raveena Kingsley (Belgium) Elise Mertens	(France) Tessah Andrianjafitrimo (Canada) Bianca Andreescu (United States) Nicole Frenkel (United States) Ronit Yurovsky
October 31	Tevlin Women's Challenger; Toronto, Canada; Hard (indoor) $50,000; Singles – Doubles	(Canada) Gabriela Dabrowski (Netherlands) Michaëlla Krajicek; 6–4, 6–3	(United States) Ashley Weinhold (United States) Caitlin Whoriskey	(United States) Raveena Kingsley (Belgium) Elise Mertens	(France) Tessah Andrianjafitrimo (Canada) Bianca Andreescu (United States) Nicole Frenkel (United States) Ronit Yurovsky
October 31	CopperWynd Pro Women's Challenge; Scottsdale, United States; Hard $50,000; Singles – Doubles	(Brazil) Beatriz Haddad Maia; 7–6^{(7–4)}, 7–6^{(7–2)}	(United States) Kristie Ahn	(United States) Kayla Day (United States) Jennifer Brady	(Austria) Barbara Haas (Bulgaria) Sesil Karatantcheva (United States) Grace Min (Russia) Varvara Flink
October 31	CopperWynd Pro Women's Challenge; Scottsdale, United States; Hard $50,000; Singles – Doubles	(United States) Ingrid Neel (United States) Taylor Townsend; 6–4, 6–3	(United States) Samantha Crawford (United States) Melanie Oudin	(United States) Kayla Day (United States) Jennifer Brady	(Austria) Barbara Haas (Bulgaria) Sesil Karatantcheva (United States) Grace Min (Russia) Varvara Flink
October 31	Chenzhou, China; Hard $25,000; Singles and Doubles draws	(Hungary) Dalma Gálfi; 6–0, 6–4	(Japan) Riko Sawayanagi	(China) Zhu Lin (China) Zhang Ying	(Bulgaria) Aleksandrina Naydenova (Russia) Veronika Kudermetova (Poland) Katarzyna Piter (China) Xun Fangying
October 31	Chenzhou, China; Hard $25,000; Singles and Doubles draws	(United States) Jacqueline Cako (Bulgaria) Aleksandrina Naydenova; 3–6, 6–4, [10–6]	(Russia) Angelina Gabueva (Georgia (country)) Sofia Shapatava	(China) Zhu Lin (China) Zhang Ying	(Bulgaria) Aleksandrina Naydenova (Russia) Veronika Kudermetova (Poland) Katarzyna Piter (China) Xun Fangying
October 31	Cúcuta, Colombia; Clay $10,000; Singles and Doubles draws	(Chile) Fernanda Brito; 4–6, 6–4, 6–1	(Colombia) María Fernanda Herazo	(Brazil) Thaísa Grana Pedretti (Chile) Bárbara Gatica	(Paraguay) Camila Giangreco Campiz (Argentina) Florencia Molinero (United Kingdom) Emily Appleton (Mexico) Ana Sofía Sánchez
October 31	Cúcuta, Colombia; Clay $10,000; Singles and Doubles draws	(Chile) Bárbara Gatica (Chile) Daniela Macarena López; 6–4, 4–6, [10–4]	(Colombia) María Paulina Pérez (Colombia) Paula Andrea Pérez	(Brazil) Thaísa Grana Pedretti (Chile) Bárbara Gatica	(Paraguay) Camila Giangreco Campiz (Argentina) Florencia Molinero (United Kingdom) Emily Appleton (Mexico) Ana Sofía Sánchez
October 31	Sharm el-Sheikh, Egypt; Hard $10,000; Singles and Doubles draws	(Austria) Melanie Klaffner; 7–5, 6–3	(Croatia) Ana Vrljić	(Turkey) Pemra Özgen (Bulgaria) Julia Terziyska	(Romania) Elena-Teodora Cadar (Romania) Ana Bianca Mihăilă (France) Caroline Roméo (Egypt) Ola Abou Zekry
October 31	Sharm el-Sheikh, Egypt; Hard $10,000; Singles and Doubles draws	(Hungary) Bianka Békefi (Hungary) Szabina Szlavikovics; 6–4, 6–4	(Russia) Sofia Dmitrieva (Russia) Anna Pribylova	(Turkey) Pemra Özgen (Bulgaria) Julia Terziyska	(Romania) Elena-Teodora Cadar (Romania) Ana Bianca Mihăilă (France) Caroline Roméo (Egypt) Ola Abou Zekry
October 31	Heraklion, Greece; Hard $10,000; Singles and Doubles draws	(Romania) Ioana Diana Pietroiu; 6–3, 2–6, 6–2	(United Kingdom) Gabriella Taylor	(France) Sara Cakarevic (Montenegro) Ana Veselinović	(Netherlands) Phillis Vanenburg (Japan) Satsuki Takamura (Poland) Stefania Rogozińska Dzik (Israel) Vlada Ekshibarova
October 31	Heraklion, Greece; Hard $10,000; Singles and Doubles draws	(Netherlands) Nina Kruijer (Netherlands) Suzan Lamens; 6–2, 4–6, [10–8]	(Belgium) Steffi Distelmans (Israel) Vlada Ekshibarova	(France) Sara Cakarevic (Montenegro) Ana Veselinović	(Netherlands) Phillis Vanenburg (Japan) Satsuki Takamura (Poland) Stefania Rogozińska Dzik (Israel) Vlada Ekshibarova
October 31	Pula, Italy; Clay $10,000; Singles and Doubles draws	(Hungary) Vanda Lukács; 6–1, 6–2	(Switzerland) Ylena In-Albon	(Bosnia and Herzegovina) Jelena Simić (Italy) Giorgia Marchetti	(Italy) Martina Caregaro (Italy) Claudia Giovine (Italy) Anna Remondina (Italy) Alice Balducci
October 31	Pula, Italy; Clay $10,000; Singles and Doubles draws	(Switzerland) Ylena In-Albon (Italy) Giorgia Marchetti; 6–1, 6–3	(Italy) Anna Remondina (Italy) Dalila Spiteri	(Bosnia and Herzegovina) Jelena Simić (Italy) Giorgia Marchetti	(Italy) Martina Caregaro (Italy) Claudia Giovine (Italy) Anna Remondina (Italy) Alice Balducci
October 31	Casablanca, Morocco; Clay $10,000; Singles and Doubles draws	(Spain) Georgina García Pérez; 6–4, 3–6, 6–2	(Oman) Fatma Al-Nabhani	(Romania) Oana Georgeta Simion (Romania) Daiana Negreanu	(France) Marie Témin (Bulgaria) Julia Stamatova (Russia) Daria Solovyeva (Spain) Arabela Fernández Rabener
October 31	Casablanca, Morocco; Clay $10,000; Singles and Doubles draws	(Romania) Daiana Negreanu (Romania) Oana Georgeta Simion; 5–7, 7–5, [12–10]	(Spain) Georgina García Pérez (Bulgaria) Julia Stamatova	(Romania) Oana Georgeta Simion (Romania) Daiana Negreanu	(France) Marie Témin (Bulgaria) Julia Stamatova (Russia) Daria Solovyeva (Spain) Arabela Fernández Rabener
October 31	Oslo, Norway; Hard (indoor) $10,000; Singles and Doubles draws	(Sweden) Jacqueline Cabaj Awad; 6–3, 6–3	(United Kingdom) Amanda Carreras	(Netherlands) Chayenne Ewijk (Germany) Sarah-Rebecca Sekulic	(Germany) Luisa Marie Huber (Spain) Ainhoa Atucha Gómez (Denmark) Karen Barritza (Slovakia) Michaela Hončová
October 31	Oslo, Norway; Hard (indoor) $10,000; Singles and Doubles draws	(Netherlands) Chayenne Ewijk (Netherlands) Rosalie van der Hoek; 6–4, 6–4	(Denmark) Karen Barritza (Slovakia) Michaela Hončová	(Netherlands) Chayenne Ewijk (Germany) Sarah-Rebecca Sekulic	(Germany) Luisa Marie Huber (Spain) Ainhoa Atucha Gómez (Denmark) Karen Barritza (Slovakia) Michaela Hončová
October 31	Stellenbosch, South Africa; Hard $10,000; Singles and Doubles draws	(South Africa) Chanel Simmonds; 4–6, 6–3, 7–5	(United States) Kaitlyn Christian	(Russia) Margarita Lazareva (South Africa) Ilze Hattingh	(Netherlands) Erika Vogelsang (South Africa) Madrie Le Roux (Switzerland) Arlinda Rushiti (Zimbabwe) Valeria Bhunu
October 31	Stellenbosch, South Africa; Hard $10,000; Singles and Doubles draws	(United States) Kaitlyn Christian (South Africa) Chanel Simmonds; 6–0, 7–6^{(7–3)}	(Zimbabwe) Valeria Bhunu (Sweden) Linnéa Malmqvist	(Russia) Margarita Lazareva (South Africa) Ilze Hattingh	(Netherlands) Erika Vogelsang (South Africa) Madrie Le Roux (Switzerland) Arlinda Rushiti (Zimbabwe) Valeria Bhunu
October 31	Stockholm, Sweden; Hard (indoor) $10,000; Singles and Doubles draws	(Bulgaria) Isabella Shinikova; 6–2, 6–4	(Slovakia) Kristína Schmiedlová	(Ukraine) Anastasiya Shoshyna (Romania) Laura-Ioana Andrei	(Sweden) Paulina Wulcan (Switzerland) Tess Sugnaux (Poland) Iga Świątek (Bosnia and Herzegovina) Dea Herdželaš
October 31	Stockholm, Sweden; Hard (indoor) $10,000; Singles and Doubles draws	(Sweden) Cornelia Lister (Ukraine) Anastasiya Shoshyna; 7–6^{(7–3)}, 6–2	(Sweden) Hilda Melander (Sweden) Paulina Milosavljevic	(Ukraine) Anastasiya Shoshyna (Romania) Laura-Ioana Andrei	(Sweden) Paulina Wulcan (Switzerland) Tess Sugnaux (Poland) Iga Świątek (Bosnia and Herzegovina) Dea Herdželaš
October 31	Hammamet, Tunisia; Clay $10,000; Singles and Doubles draws	(Switzerland) Jil Teichmann; 6–4, 6–4	(Romania) Diana Enache	(Romania) Irina Fetecău (Brazil) Carolina Alves	(Italy) Federica Arcidiacono (Chile) Ivania Martinich (Slovakia) Barbara Kötelesová (Italy) Francesca Sella
October 31	Hammamet, Tunisia; Clay $10,000; Singles and Doubles draws	(Argentina) Guadalupe Pérez Rojas (Switzerland) Jil Teichmann; 6–1, 4–6, [11–9]	(Serbia) Tamara Čurović (Slovakia) Barbara Kötelesová	(Romania) Irina Fetecău (Brazil) Carolina Alves	(Italy) Federica Arcidiacono (Chile) Ivania Martinich (Slovakia) Barbara Kötelesová (Italy) Francesca Sella
October 31	Antalya, Turkey; Clay $10,000; Singles and Doubles draws	(Turkey) Ayla Aksu; 7–5, 6–1	(Germany) Tayisiya Morderger	(Romania) Georgia Andreea Crăciun (Ukraine) Kateryna Sliusar	(Ukraine) Katarina Zavatska (Bulgaria) Dia Evtimova (Ukraine) Alona Fomina (Turkey) Melis Sezer
October 31	Antalya, Turkey; Clay $10,000; Singles and Doubles draws	(Turkey) Ayla Aksu (Turkey) Melis Sezer; 6–1, 7–6^{(7–5)}	(Bulgaria) Dia Evtimova (Estonia) Valeria Gorlats	(Romania) Georgia Andreea Crăciun (Ukraine) Kateryna Sliusar	(Ukraine) Katarina Zavatska (Bulgaria) Dia Evtimova (Ukraine) Alona Fomina (Turkey) Melis Sezer
October 31	Sheffield, United Kingdom; Hard (indoor) $10,000; Singles and Doubles draws	(Czech Republic) Petra Krejsová; 6–4, 6–3	(France) Lou Brouleau	(United Kingdom) Eden Silva (Italy) Alice Matteucci	(United Kingdom) Lauryn John-Baptiste (Georgia (country)) Mariam Bolkvadze (United Kingdom) Maia Lumsden (United States) Dasha Ivanova
October 31	Sheffield, United Kingdom; Hard (indoor) $10,000; Singles and Doubles draws	(United Kingdom) Sarah Beth Grey (United Kingdom) Olivia Nicholls; 7–6^{(7–3)}, 7–5	(Finland) Mia Eklund (Belarus) Nika Shytkouskaya	(United Kingdom) Eden Silva (Italy) Alice Matteucci	(United Kingdom) Lauryn John-Baptiste (Georgia (country)) Mariam Bolkvadze (United Kingdom) Maia Lumsden (United States) Dasha Ivanova

=== November ===
Week of	Tournament	Winner	Runners-up	Semifinalists	Quarterfinalists
November 7	Ando Securities Open; Tokyo, Japan; Hard $100,000; Singles – Doubles	(China) Zhang Shuai; 4–6, 7–6^{(7–2)}, 6–2	(Hungary) Dalma Gálfi	(China) Peng Shuai (Germany) Tatjana Maria	(Thailand) Luksika Kumkhum (South Korea) Jang Su-jeong (Croatia) Jana Fett (Japan) Kurumi Nara
November 7	Ando Securities Open; Tokyo, Japan; Hard $100,000; Singles – Doubles	(Japan) Rika Fujiwara (Japan) Yuki Naito; 6–4, 6–7^{(12–14)}, [10–8]	(United States) Jamie Loeb (Belgium) An-Sophie Mestach	(China) Peng Shuai (Germany) Tatjana Maria	(Thailand) Luksika Kumkhum (South Korea) Jang Su-jeong (Croatia) Jana Fett (Japan) Kurumi Nara
November 7	Waco Showdown; Waco, United States; Hard $50,000; Singles – Doubles	(Brazil) Beatriz Haddad Maia; 6–2, 3–6, 6–1	(United States) Grace Min	(United States) Samantha Crawford (United States) Robin Anderson	(United States) Danielle Collins (United States) Jennifer Elie (Bulgaria) Sesil Karatantcheva (United States) Sachia Vickery
November 7	Waco Showdown; Waco, United States; Hard $50,000; Singles – Doubles	(Netherlands) Michaëlla Krajicek (United States) Taylor Townsend; Walkover	(Romania) Mihaela Buzărnescu (Mexico) Renata Zarazúa	(United States) Samantha Crawford (United States) Robin Anderson	(United States) Danielle Collins (United States) Jennifer Elie (Bulgaria) Sesil Karatantcheva (United States) Sachia Vickery
November 7	Minsk, Belarus; Hard (indoor) $25,000; Singles and Doubles draws	(Russia) Anastasia Frolova; Walkover	(Russia) Anna Kalinskaya	(Russia) Anna Blinkova (Russia) Polina Leykina	(Russia) Valeriya Solovyeva (Ukraine) Anastasia Zarytska (Uzbekistan) Akgul Amanmuradova (Turkey) Pemra Özgen
November 7	Minsk, Belarus; Hard (indoor) $25,000; Singles and Doubles draws	(Russia) Anna Kalinskaya (Belarus) Nika Shytkouskaya; 6–2, 6–3	(Belarus) Ilona Kremen (Belarus) Vera Lapko	(Russia) Anna Blinkova (Russia) Polina Leykina	(Russia) Valeriya Solovyeva (Ukraine) Anastasia Zarytska (Uzbekistan) Akgul Amanmuradova (Turkey) Pemra Özgen
November 7	Pune, India; Hard $25,000+H; Singles and Doubles draws	(Russia) Irina Khromacheva; 6–1, 6–1	(Japan) Riko Sawayanagi	(India) Ankita Raina (Switzerland) Conny Perrin	(China) Lu Jiajing (Romania) Jaqueline Cristian (Brazil) Laura Pigossi (Slovenia) Tadeja Majerič
November 7	Pune, India; Hard $25,000+H; Singles and Doubles draws	(Russia) Irina Khromacheva (Bulgaria) Aleksandrina Naydenova; 6–2, 6–1	(India) Sowjanya Bavisetti (India) Rishika Sunkara	(India) Ankita Raina (Switzerland) Conny Perrin	(China) Lu Jiajing (Romania) Jaqueline Cristian (Brazil) Laura Pigossi (Slovenia) Tadeja Majerič
November 7	Slovak Open; Bratislava, Slovakia; Hard (indoor) $25,000; Singles and Doubles draws	(Romania) Andreea Mitu; 6–2, 6–3	(Czech Republic) Denisa Allertová	(Czech Republic) Tereza Smitková (Netherlands) Bibiane Schoofs	(Netherlands) Arantxa Rus (Bulgaria) Isabella Shinikova (Germany) Tamara Korpatsch (Slovakia) Viktória Kužmová
November 7	Slovak Open; Bratislava, Slovakia; Hard (indoor) $25,000; Singles and Doubles draws	(United Kingdom) Jocelyn Rae (United Kingdom) Anna Smith; 6–3, 6–2	(Netherlands) Quirine Lemoine (Netherlands) Eva Wacanno	(Czech Republic) Tereza Smitková (Netherlands) Bibiane Schoofs	(Netherlands) Arantxa Rus (Bulgaria) Isabella Shinikova (Germany) Tamara Korpatsch (Slovakia) Viktória Kužmová
November 7	Sharm el-Sheikh, Egypt; Hard $10,000; Singles and Doubles draws	(Germany) Julia Wachaczyk; 7–5, 6–1	(Ukraine) Angelina Shakhraychuk	(Russia) Sofia Dmitrieva (Romania) Elena-Teodora Cadar	(China) Meng Ran (France) Cindy Castille (Hungary) Bianka Békefi (Hungary) Szabina Szlavikovics
November 7	Sharm el-Sheikh, Egypt; Hard $10,000; Singles and Doubles draws	(Bulgaria) Julia Terziyska (Germany) Julia Wachaczyk; 6–4, 4–6, [10–1]	(Hungary) Bianka Békefi (Hungary) Szabina Szlavikovics	(Russia) Sofia Dmitrieva (Romania) Elena-Teodora Cadar	(China) Meng Ran (France) Cindy Castille (Hungary) Bianka Békefi (Hungary) Szabina Szlavikovics
November 7	Heraklion, Greece; Hard $10,000; Singles and Doubles draws	(Romania) Raluca Georgiana Șerban; 6–4, 7–5	(United Kingdom) Gabriella Taylor	(Austria) Mira Antonitsch (Germany) Emily Seibold	(Belgium) Magali Kempen (Israel) Vlada Ekshibarova (Netherlands) Phillis Vanenburg (Moldova) Anastasia Vdovenco
November 7	Heraklion, Greece; Hard $10,000; Singles and Doubles draws	(Belgium) Michaela Boev (Cambodia) Andrea Ka; 6–4, 6–4	(Belgium) Steffi Distelmans (Israel) Vlada Ekshibarova	(Austria) Mira Antonitsch (Germany) Emily Seibold	(Belgium) Magali Kempen (Israel) Vlada Ekshibarova (Netherlands) Phillis Vanenburg (Moldova) Anastasia Vdovenco
November 7	Solarino, Italy; Carpet $10,000; Singles and Doubles draws	(Italy) Dalila Spiteri; 6–1, 6–2	(Italy) Anna Remondina	(Italy) Maria Masini (Italy) Deborah Chiesa	(France) Elixane Lechemia (France) Mathilde Armitano (France) Clémence Fayol (Switzerland) Susan Bandecchi
November 7	Solarino, Italy; Carpet $10,000; Singles and Doubles draws	(France) Mathilde Armitano (France) Elixane Lechemia; 7–5, 6–1	(Italy) Deborah Chiesa (Italy) Maria Masini	(Italy) Maria Masini (Italy) Deborah Chiesa	(France) Elixane Lechemia (France) Mathilde Armitano (France) Clémence Fayol (Switzerland) Susan Bandecchi
November 7	Casablanca, Morocco; Clay $10,000; Singles and Doubles draws	(Romania) Oana Georgeta Simion; 6–3, 6–1	(Romania) Daiana Negreanu	(Romania) Cristina Adamescu (Italy) Martina Spigarelli	(Oman) Fatma Al-Nabhani (South Africa) Zoë Kruger (Bulgaria) Julia Stamatova (Croatia) Mariana Dražić
November 7	Casablanca, Morocco; Clay $10,000; Singles and Doubles draws	(Romania) Daiana Negreanu (Romania) Oana Georgeta Simion; 6–2, 6–1	(Oman) Fatma Al-Nabhani (Spain) Olga Parres Azcoitia	(Romania) Cristina Adamescu (Italy) Martina Spigarelli	(Oman) Fatma Al-Nabhani (South Africa) Zoë Kruger (Bulgaria) Julia Stamatova (Croatia) Mariana Dražić
November 7	Stellenbosch, South Africa; Hard $10,000; Singles and Doubles draws	(South Africa) Chanel Simmonds; 6–1, 6–3	(Russia) Margarita Lazareva	(United States) Lauren Embree (Germany) Julyette Steur	(Namibia) Liniques Theron (South Africa) Ilze Hattingh (United Kingdom) Alice Gillan (United States) Kaitlyn Christian
November 7	Stellenbosch, South Africa; Hard $10,000; Singles and Doubles draws	(South Africa) Ilze Hattingh (South Africa) Madrie Le Roux; 6–1, 6–2	(Zimbabwe) Valeria Bhunu (Sweden) Linnéa Malmqvist	(United States) Lauren Embree (Germany) Julyette Steur	(Namibia) Liniques Theron (South Africa) Ilze Hattingh (United Kingdom) Alice Gillan (United States) Kaitlyn Christian
November 7	Vinaròs, Spain; Clay $10,000; Singles and Doubles draws	(Venezuela) Andrea Gámiz; 1–6, 6–1, 6–4	(France) Jessika Ponchet	(Romania) Ioana Loredana Roșca (Ukraine) Oleksandra Korashvili	(Spain) Cristina Bucșa (Spain) Alba Carrillo Marín (India) Snehadevi Reddy (Spain) Irene Burillo Escorihuela
November 7	Vinaròs, Spain; Clay $10,000; Singles and Doubles draws	(Ukraine) Oleksandra Korashvili (Romania) Ioana Loredana Roșca; 6–4, 7–6^{(7–2)}	(Venezuela) Andrea Gámiz (Ecuador) Charlotte Römer	(Romania) Ioana Loredana Roșca (Ukraine) Oleksandra Korashvili	(Spain) Cristina Bucșa (Spain) Alba Carrillo Marín (India) Snehadevi Reddy (Spain) Irene Burillo Escorihuela
November 7	Hammamet, Tunisia; Clay $10,000; Singles and Doubles draws	(Germany) Katharina Hobgarski; 6–0, 6–1	(Brazil) Carolina Alves	(Switzerland) Jil Teichmann (Serbia) Bojana Marković	(Brazil) Erika Drozd Pereira (Argentina) Guadalupe Pérez Rojas (Italy) Federica Arcidiacono (Romania) Ilona Georgiana Ghioroaie
November 7	Hammamet, Tunisia; Clay $10,000; Singles and Doubles draws	(Romania) Diana Enache (Romania) Ilona Georgiana Ghioroaie; 3–6, 6–1, [10–8]	(Brazil) Carolina Alves (Bolivia) Noelia Zeballos	(Switzerland) Jil Teichmann (Serbia) Bojana Marković	(Brazil) Erika Drozd Pereira (Argentina) Guadalupe Pérez Rojas (Italy) Federica Arcidiacono (Romania) Ilona Georgiana Ghioroaie
November 7	Antalya, Turkey; Clay $10,000; Singles and Doubles draws	(Germany) Tayisiya Morderger; 6–2, 6–2	(Germany) Dana Kremer	(Ukraine) Kateryna Sliusar (Turkey) Berfu Cengiz	(Austria) Pia König (Russia) Yanina Darishina (Germany) Yana Morderger (Turkey) Melis Sezer
November 7	Antalya, Turkey; Clay $10,000; Singles and Doubles draws	(Ukraine) Diana Khodan (Ukraine) Mariya Koryttseva; 6–1, 6–4	(Turkey) Berfu Cengiz (Turkey) Melis Sezer	(Ukraine) Kateryna Sliusar (Turkey) Berfu Cengiz	(Austria) Pia König (Russia) Yanina Darishina (Germany) Yana Morderger (Turkey) Melis Sezer
November 7	Aegon GB Pro-Series Shrewsbury; Shrewsbury, United Kingdom; Hard (indoor) $10,000; Singles and Doubles draws	(Czech Republic) Petra Krejsová; 6–1, 7–5	(Switzerland) Tess Sugnaux	(United States) Alexandra Stevenson (Hong Kong) Zhang Ling	(United Kingdom) Maia Lumsden (United Kingdom) Sarah Beth Grey (United Kingdom) Laura Sainsbury (France) Emmanuelle Salas
November 7	Aegon GB Pro-Series Shrewsbury; Shrewsbury, United Kingdom; Hard (indoor) $10,000; Singles and Doubles draws	(United Kingdom) Sarah Beth Grey (United Kingdom) Olivia Nicholls; 6–3, 6–3	(United Kingdom) Alicia Barnett (United Kingdom) Lauren McMinn	(United States) Alexandra Stevenson (Hong Kong) Zhang Ling	(United Kingdom) Maia Lumsden (United Kingdom) Sarah Beth Grey (United Kingdom) Laura Sainsbury (France) Emmanuelle Salas
November 14	ITF Women's Circuit – Shenzhen; Shenzhen, China; Hard $100,000; Singles – Doubles	(China) Peng Shuai; 3–6, 7–5, 6–4	(Romania) Patricia Maria Țig	(China) Liu Fangzhou (China) Zhu Lin	(China) Wang Qiang (Serbia) Nina Stojanović (China) Xu Yifan (United States) Jacqueline Cako
November 14	ITF Women's Circuit – Shenzhen; Shenzhen, China; Hard $100,000; Singles – Doubles	(Serbia) Nina Stojanović (China) You Xiaodi; 6–4, 7–6^{(8–6)}	(China) Han Xinyun (China) Zhu Lin	(China) Liu Fangzhou (China) Zhu Lin	(China) Wang Qiang (Serbia) Nina Stojanović (China) Xu Yifan (United States) Jacqueline Cako
November 14	Dunlop World Challenge; Toyota, Japan; Carpet (indoor) $50,000+H; Singles – Doubles	(Belarus) Aryna Sabalenka; 6–2, 6–4	(Australia) Lizette Cabrera	(Japan) Shiho Akita (Hungary) Dalma Gálfi	(Croatia) Jana Fett (Poland) Magdalena Fręch (Japan) Makoto Ninomiya (Japan) Ayano Shimizu
November 14	Dunlop World Challenge; Toyota, Japan; Carpet (indoor) $50,000+H; Singles – Doubles	(Russia) Ksenia Lykina (Japan) Akiko Omae; 6–7^{(4–7)}, 6–2, [10–5]	(Japan) Rika Fujiwara (Japan) Ayaka Okuno	(Japan) Shiho Akita (Hungary) Dalma Gálfi	(Croatia) Jana Fett (Poland) Magdalena Fręch (Japan) Makoto Ninomiya (Japan) Ayano Shimizu
November 14	Zawada, Poland; Carpet (indoor) $25,000; Singles and Doubles draws	(Netherlands) Quirine Lemoine; 3–6, 6–4, 7–5	(Germany) Laura Schaeder	(Netherlands) Lesley Kerkhove (Liechtenstein) Kathinka von Deichmann	(Ukraine) Anastasiya Shoshyna (Poland) Maja Chwalińska (Latvia) Diāna Marcinkēviča (Switzerland) Conny Perrin
November 14	Zawada, Poland; Carpet (indoor) $25,000; Singles and Doubles draws	(Poland) Justyna Jegiołka (Latvia) Diāna Marcinkēviča; 6–4, 7–5	(Belarus) Ilona Kremen (Belarus) Vera Lapko	(Netherlands) Lesley Kerkhove (Liechtenstein) Kathinka von Deichmann	(Ukraine) Anastasiya Shoshyna (Poland) Maja Chwalińska (Latvia) Diāna Marcinkēviča (Switzerland) Conny Perrin
November 14	Sharm el-Sheikh, Egypt; Hard $10,000; Singles and Doubles draws	(Germany) Sarah-Rebecca Sekulic; 7–6^{(10–8)}, 6–4	(Germany) Julia Wachaczyk	(Belgium) Britt Geukens (United Kingdom) Suzy Larkin	(Romania) Elena-Teodora Cadar (Sweden) Brenda Njuki (Italy) Claudia Franzè (Serbia) Barbara Bonić
November 14	Sharm el-Sheikh, Egypt; Hard $10,000; Singles and Doubles draws	(Serbia) Barbara Bonić (Germany) Julia Wachaczyk; 7–5, 4–6, [10–6]	(Romania) Elena-Teodora Cadar (Belgium) Britt Geukens	(Belgium) Britt Geukens (United Kingdom) Suzy Larkin	(Romania) Elena-Teodora Cadar (Sweden) Brenda Njuki (Italy) Claudia Franzè (Serbia) Barbara Bonić
November 14	AAVA Open; Helsinki, Finland; Hard (indoor) $10,000; Singles and Doubles draws	(Denmark) Karen Barritza; 6–3, 6–4	(Russia) Elena Rybakina	(United States) Sabrina Santamaria (Belgium) Kimberley Zimmermann	(France) Margot Yerolymos (Russia) Elina Nepliy (Russia) Valeriya Urzhumova (Russia) Anastasia Chikalkina
November 14	AAVA Open; Helsinki, Finland; Hard (indoor) $10,000; Singles and Doubles draws	(Romania) Laura-Ioana Andrei (Denmark) Karen Barritza; 6–4, 6–3	(Russia) Alina Silich (Russia) Valeriya Zeleva	(United States) Sabrina Santamaria (Belgium) Kimberley Zimmermann	(France) Margot Yerolymos (Russia) Elina Nepliy (Russia) Valeriya Urzhumova (Russia) Anastasia Chikalkina
November 14	Heraklion, Greece; Hard $10,000; Singles and Doubles draws	(Romania) Raluca Georgiana Șerban; 3–6, 4–0, ret.	(Netherlands) Nina Kruijer	(Belgium) Magali Kempen (United Kingdom) Sarah Beth Grey	(United Kingdom) Eden Silva (Japan) Satsuki Takamura (Belgium) Steffi Distelmans (Austria) Nicole Rottmann
November 14	Heraklion, Greece; Hard $10,000; Singles and Doubles draws	(France) Manon Arcangioli (Greece) Despina Papamichail; 6–4, 6–2	(Denmark) Emilie Francati (United Kingdom) Sarah Beth Grey	(Belgium) Magali Kempen (United Kingdom) Sarah Beth Grey	(United Kingdom) Eden Silva (Japan) Satsuki Takamura (Belgium) Steffi Distelmans (Austria) Nicole Rottmann
November 14	Solarino, Italy; Carpet $10,000; Singles and Doubles draws	(Italy) Ludmilla Samsonova; 3–6, 6–0, 6–1	(Netherlands) Kelly Versteeg	(Italy) Alice Matteucci (Italy) Anna Remondina	(France) Elixane Lechemia (Italy) Miriana Tona (Brazil) Karolayne Alexandre da Rosa (Italy) Deborah Chiesa
November 14	Solarino, Italy; Carpet $10,000; Singles and Doubles draws	(Italy) Anna Remondina (Italy) Dalila Spiteri; Walkover	(France) Mathilde Armitano (France) Elixane Lechemia	(Italy) Alice Matteucci (Italy) Anna Remondina	(France) Elixane Lechemia (Italy) Miriana Tona (Brazil) Karolayne Alexandre da Rosa (Italy) Deborah Chiesa
November 14	Rabat, Morocco; Clay $10,000; Singles and Doubles draws	(Spain) Georgina García Pérez; 6–3, 2–6, 6–1	(Oman) Fatma Al-Nabhani	(Russia) Natalia Orlova (Romania) Daiana Negreanu	(Croatia) Mariana Dražić (Italy) Federica Arcidiacono (Hungary) Panna Udvardy (Spain) Arabela Fernández Rabener
November 14	Rabat, Morocco; Clay $10,000; Singles and Doubles draws	(Romania) Cristina Adamescu (Romania) Daiana Negreanu; 6–3, 1–6, [10–5]	(Oman) Fatma Al-Nabhani (Spain) Olga Parres Azcoitia	(Russia) Natalia Orlova (Romania) Daiana Negreanu	(Croatia) Mariana Dražić (Italy) Federica Arcidiacono (Hungary) Panna Udvardy (Spain) Arabela Fernández Rabener
November 14	Stellenbosch, South Africa; Hard $10,000; Singles and Doubles draws	(Germany) Julyette Steur; 6–0, 6–4	(South Africa) Chanel Simmonds	(United States) Lauren Embree (South Africa) Madrie Le Roux	(South Africa) Ilze Hattingh (Germany) Katharina Hering (Russia) Margarita Lazareva (Zimbabwe) Valeria Bhunu
November 14	Stellenbosch, South Africa; Hard $10,000; Singles and Doubles draws	(Russia) Margarita Lazareva (Netherlands) Erika Vogelsang; 7–6^{(7–2)}, 6–1	(South Africa) Eden D'Oliveira (United Kingdom) Laura Deigman	(United States) Lauren Embree (South Africa) Madrie Le Roux	(South Africa) Ilze Hattingh (Germany) Katharina Hering (Russia) Margarita Lazareva (Zimbabwe) Valeria Bhunu
November 14	Benicarló, Spain; Clay $10,000; Singles and Doubles draws	(France) Jessika Ponchet; 6–0, 7–6^{(8–6)}	(United Kingdom) Amanda Carreras	(Spain) Nuria Párrizas Díaz (Croatia) Iva Primorac	(Greece) Eleni Kordolaimi (Spain) Irene Burillo Escorihuela (Romania) Miriam Bianca Bulgaru (India) Snehadevi Reddy
November 14	Benicarló, Spain; Clay $10,000; Singles and Doubles draws	(United Kingdom) Amanda Carreras (Ecuador) Charlotte Römer; 5–7, 6–3, [10–7]	(Ukraine) Oleksandra Korashvili (Australia) Isabelle Wallace	(Spain) Nuria Párrizas Díaz (Croatia) Iva Primorac	(Greece) Eleni Kordolaimi (Spain) Irene Burillo Escorihuela (Romania) Miriam Bianca Bulgaru (India) Snehadevi Reddy
November 14	Hammamet, Tunisia; Clay $10,000; Singles and Doubles draws	(Germany) Katharina Hobgarski; 6–4, 6–2	(France) Yasmine Mansouri	(Serbia) Tamara Čurović (Brazil) Carolina Alves	(Italy) Federica Prati (France) Emma Léné (Czech Republic) Anna Sisková (Belgium) Déborah Kerfs
November 14	Hammamet, Tunisia; Clay $10,000; Singles and Doubles draws	(Serbia) Tamara Čurović (Slovakia) Barbara Kötelesová; 7–5, 3–6, [10–4]	(Belgium) Déborah Kerfs (Poland) Patrycja Polańska	(Serbia) Tamara Čurović (Brazil) Carolina Alves	(Italy) Federica Prati (France) Emma Léné (Czech Republic) Anna Sisková (Belgium) Déborah Kerfs
November 14	Antalya, Turkey; Clay $10,000; Singles and Doubles draws	(Serbia) Olga Danilović; 6–2, 6–3	(Slovakia) Vivien Juhászová	(Turkey) Berfu Cengiz (Austria) Pia König	(Ukraine) Kateryna Sliusar (Russia) Daria Lodikova (Switzerland) Chiara Grimm (Ukraine) Mariya Koryttseva
November 14	Antalya, Turkey; Clay $10,000; Singles and Doubles draws	(Turkey) Berfu Cengiz (Serbia) Olga Danilović; 6–4, 6–4	(Germany) Tayisiya Morderger (Germany) Yana Morderger	(Turkey) Berfu Cengiz (Austria) Pia König	(Ukraine) Kateryna Sliusar (Russia) Daria Lodikova (Switzerland) Chiara Grimm (Ukraine) Mariya Koryttseva
November 21	Valencia, Spain; Clay $25,000; Singles and Doubles draws	(Italy) Jasmine Paolini; 6–1, 2–6, 6–4	(Netherlands) Quirine Lemoine	(Australia) Isabelle Wallace (Spain) Cristina Bucșa	(Spain) María Teresa Torró Flor (Ukraine) Oleksandra Korashvili (Slovenia) Tamara Zidanšek (Romania) Irina Maria Bara
November 21	Valencia, Spain; Clay $25,000; Singles and Doubles draws	(North Macedonia) Lina Gjorcheska (Kazakhstan) Galina Voskoboeva; 6–0, 6–0	(Spain) Alicia Herrero Liñana (Russia) Ksenija Sharifova	(Australia) Isabelle Wallace (Spain) Cristina Bucșa	(Spain) María Teresa Torró Flor (Ukraine) Oleksandra Korashvili (Slovenia) Tamara Zidanšek (Romania) Irina Maria Bara
November 21	Nashville, United States; Hard (indoor) $25,000; Singles and Doubles draws	(Canada) Gabriela Dabrowski; 7–6^{(8–6)}, 6–4	(United States) Jennifer Elie	(France) Tessah Andrianjafitrimo (Japan) Mari Osaka	(United States) Francesca Di Lorenzo (United States) Brianna Morgan (United States) Ronit Yurovsky (United States) Ellie Halbauer
November 21	Nashville, United States; Hard (indoor) $25,000; Singles and Doubles draws	(United States) Catherine Harrison (United States) Madeleine Kobelt; 6–3, 6–0	(United States) Melissa Kopinski (United States) Felicity Maltby	(France) Tessah Andrianjafitrimo (Japan) Mari Osaka	(United States) Francesca Di Lorenzo (United States) Brianna Morgan (United States) Ronit Yurovsky (United States) Ellie Halbauer
November 21	Santiago, Chile; Clay $10,000; Singles and Doubles draws	(Brazil) Paula Cristina Gonçalves; 4–6, 4–4, ret.	(Chile) Daniela Seguel	(Chile) Fernanda Brito (Mexico) Victoria Rodríguez	(Argentina) Paula Ormaechea (Paraguay) Camila Giangreco Campiz (Argentina) Stephanie Mariel Petit (Argentina) Julieta Lara Estable
November 21	Santiago, Chile; Clay $10,000; Singles and Doubles draws	(Mexico) Victoria Rodríguez (Mexico) Ana Sofía Sánchez; 7–5, 7–5	(Chile) Fernanda Brito (Paraguay) Camila Giangreco Campiz	(Chile) Fernanda Brito (Mexico) Victoria Rodríguez	(Argentina) Paula Ormaechea (Paraguay) Camila Giangreco Campiz (Argentina) Stephanie Mariel Petit (Argentina) Julieta Lara Estable
November 21	Sharm el-Sheikh, Egypt; Hard $10,000; Singles and Doubles draws	(Germany) Sarah-Rebecca Sekulic; 6–1, 6–1	(Sweden) Brenda Njuki	(Turkey) Pemra Özgen (Serbia) Barbara Bonić	(Egypt) Ola Abou Zekry (Romania) Elena-Teodora Cadar (Belgium) Britt Geukens (Portugal) Inês Murta
November 21	Sharm el-Sheikh, Egypt; Hard $10,000; Singles and Doubles draws	(Serbia) Barbara Bonić (Ukraine) Angelina Shakhraychuk; 2–6, 6–2, [10–4]	(Romania) Elena-Teodora Cadar (Sweden) Brenda Njuki	(Turkey) Pemra Özgen (Serbia) Barbara Bonić	(Egypt) Ola Abou Zekry (Romania) Elena-Teodora Cadar (Belgium) Britt Geukens (Portugal) Inês Murta
November 21	Heraklion, Greece; Hard $10,000; Singles and Doubles draws	(Russia) Marta Paigina; 7–5, 6–3	(Italy) Cristiana Ferrando	(Romania) Raluca Georgiana Șerban (Austria) Marlies Szupper	(United Kingdom) Sarah Beth Grey (United Kingdom) Eden Silva (Germany) Lisa Matviyenko (France) Manon Arcangioli
November 21	Heraklion, Greece; Hard $10,000; Singles and Doubles draws	(Israel) Vlada Ekshibarova (Romania) Raluca Georgiana Șerban; 6–4, 7–6^{(7–4)}	(Belgium) Michaela Boev (Italy) Cristiana Ferrando	(Romania) Raluca Georgiana Șerban (Austria) Marlies Szupper	(United Kingdom) Sarah Beth Grey (United Kingdom) Eden Silva (Germany) Lisa Matviyenko (France) Manon Arcangioli
November 21	Solarino, Italy; Carpet $10,000; Singles and Doubles draws	(Italy) Alice Matteucci; 6–3, 7–6^{(7–1)}	(Belgium) Klaartje Liebens	(Italy) Giorgia Marchetti (Italy) Corinna Dentoni	(Italy) Maria Masini (Poland) Justyna Jegiołka (Netherlands) Kelly Versteeg (Italy) Dalila Spiteri
November 21	Solarino, Italy; Carpet $10,000; Singles and Doubles draws	(Romania) Elena Bogdan (Poland) Justyna Jegiołka; 4–6, 6–3, [10–7]	(Italy) Veronica Napolitano (Italy) Miriana Tona	(Italy) Giorgia Marchetti (Italy) Corinna Dentoni	(Italy) Maria Masini (Poland) Justyna Jegiołka (Netherlands) Kelly Versteeg (Italy) Dalila Spiteri
November 21	Hua Hin, Thailand; Hard $10,000; Singles and Doubles draws	(Russia) Natela Dzalamidze; 6–1, 6–3	(Thailand) Nudnida Luangnam	(Serbia) Natalija Kostić (Thailand) Varunya Wongteanchai	(Japan) Chihiro Muramatsu (Japan) Haruna Arakawa (Thailand) Kamonwan Buayam (South Korea) Ahn Yu-jin
November 21	Hua Hin, Thailand; Hard $10,000; Singles and Doubles draws	(Malaysia) Jawairiah Noordin (Indonesia) Jessy Rompies; 6–4, 6–3	(Thailand) Kamonwan Buayam (Hong Kong) Zhang Ling	(Serbia) Natalija Kostić (Thailand) Varunya Wongteanchai	(Japan) Chihiro Muramatsu (Japan) Haruna Arakawa (Thailand) Kamonwan Buayam (South Korea) Ahn Yu-jin
November 21	Hammamet, Tunisia; Clay $10,000; Singles and Doubles draws	(Germany) Katharina Hobgarski; 6–1, 7–5	(Italy) Gaia Sanesi	(Italy) Camilla Scala (Bolivia) Noelia Zeballos	(Brazil) Carolina Alves (Algeria) Inès Ibbou (Poland) Sandra Zaniewska (Italy) Valeria Prosperi
November 21	Hammamet, Tunisia; Clay $10,000; Singles and Doubles draws	(Serbia) Tamara Čurović (Belgium) Déborah Kerfs; 7–6^{(7–5)}, 6–3	(Brazil) Carolina Alves (Bolivia) Noelia Zeballos	(Italy) Camilla Scala (Bolivia) Noelia Zeballos	(Brazil) Carolina Alves (Algeria) Inès Ibbou (Poland) Sandra Zaniewska (Italy) Valeria Prosperi
November 21	Antalya, Turkey; Clay $10,000; Singles and Doubles draws	(Hungary) Ágnes Bukta; 7–5, 6–2	(Germany) Dana Kremer	(Ukraine) Maryna Chernyshova (Bulgaria) Dia Evtimova	(Slovakia) Vivien Juhászová (Turkey) Melis Sezer (Ukraine) Diana Khodan (Bulgaria) Ani Vangelova
November 21	Antalya, Turkey; Clay $10,000; Singles and Doubles draws	(Bulgaria) Dia Evtimova (Turkey) Melis Sezer; 6–4, 6–3	(Hungary) Ágnes Bukta (Slovakia) Vivien Juhászová	(Ukraine) Maryna Chernyshova (Bulgaria) Dia Evtimova	(Slovakia) Vivien Juhászová (Turkey) Melis Sezer (Ukraine) Diana Khodan (Bulgaria) Ani Vangelova
November 28	Santiago, Chile; Clay $25,000; Singles and Doubles draws	(Slovenia) Tamara Zidanšek; 6–1, 6–4	(Brazil) Paula Cristina Gonçalves	(Chile) Bárbara Gatica (Chile) Alexa Guarachi	(Argentina) Victoria Bosio (Mexico) Ana Sofía Sánchez (Brazil) Nathaly Kurata (Mexico) Victoria Rodríguez
November 28	Santiago, Chile; Clay $25,000; Singles and Doubles draws	(Argentina) Guadalupe Pérez Rojas (Slovenia) Tamara Zidanšek; 6–3, 7–6^{(7–5)}	(United States) Usue Maitane Arconada (Italy) Georgia Brescia	(Chile) Bárbara Gatica (Chile) Alexa Guarachi	(Argentina) Victoria Bosio (Mexico) Ana Sofía Sánchez (Brazil) Nathaly Kurata (Mexico) Victoria Rodríguez
November 28	Cairo, Egypt; Clay $10,000; Singles and Doubles draws	(Serbia) Bojana Marinković; 6–1, 6–0	(Australia) Jelena Stojanovic	(Russia) Anna Morgina (Chinese Taipei) Lee Pei-chi	(United Kingdom) Suzy Larkin (Japan) Akiho Kakuya (Russia) Veronica Miroshnichenko (United States) Madison Bourguignon
November 28	Cairo, Egypt; Clay $10,000; Singles and Doubles draws	(Serbia) Barbara Bonić (Australia) Jelena Stojanovic; 6–1, 6–4	(United Kingdom) Suzy Larkin (Russia) Veronica Miroshnichenko	(Russia) Anna Morgina (Chinese Taipei) Lee Pei-chi	(United Kingdom) Suzy Larkin (Japan) Akiho Kakuya (Russia) Veronica Miroshnichenko (United States) Madison Bourguignon
November 28	Ramat Gan, Israel; Hard $10,000; Singles and Doubles draws	(Israel) Deniz Khazaniuk; 7–5, 6–3	(Czech Republic) Miriam Kolodziejová	(France) Pauline Payet (Ukraine) Valeriya Strakhova	(Romania) Daiana Negreanu (Russia) Marta Paigina (Israel) Vlada Ekshibarova (Romania) Ioana Diana Pietroiu
November 28	Ramat Gan, Israel; Hard $10,000; Singles and Doubles draws	(Israel) Vlada Ekshibarova (Russia) Ekaterina Yashina; 6–2, 7–6^{(7–4)}	(Romania) Daiana Negreanu (Israel) Keren Shlomo	(France) Pauline Payet (Ukraine) Valeriya Strakhova	(Romania) Daiana Negreanu (Russia) Marta Paigina (Israel) Vlada Ekshibarova (Romania) Ioana Diana Pietroiu
November 28	Cordenons, Italy; Carpet (indoor) $10,000; Singles and Doubles draws	(Romania) Laura-Ioana Andrei; 6–4, 6–2	(Germany) Laura Schaeder	(Turkey) Pemra Özgen (Switzerland) Naïma Karamoko	(Italy) Stefania Rubini (Italy) Anna Remondina (Croatia) Ana Vrljić (Germany) Caroline Werner
November 28	Cordenons, Italy; Carpet (indoor) $10,000; Singles and Doubles draws	(Romania) Laura-Ioana Andrei (Ukraine) Anastasia Zarytska; 6–0, 7–6^{(7–3)}	(Switzerland) Nina Stadler (Germany) Caroline Werner	(Turkey) Pemra Özgen (Switzerland) Naïma Karamoko	(Italy) Stefania Rubini (Italy) Anna Remondina (Croatia) Ana Vrljić (Germany) Caroline Werner
November 28	Castellón, Spain; Clay $10,000; Singles and Doubles draws	(Australia) Isabelle Wallace; 6–2, 6–1	(Venezuela) Andrea Gámiz	(Moldova) Alexandra Perper (Spain) Olga Sáez Larra	(Spain) Georgina García Pérez (Brazil) Laura Pigossi (Spain) Paula Arias Manjón (Romania) Miriam Bianca Bulgaru
November 28	Castellón, Spain; Clay $10,000; Singles and Doubles draws	(Brazil) Laura Pigossi (France) Jessika Ponchet; 6–1, 6–3	(Spain) Arabela Fernández Rabener (Australia) Isabelle Wallace	(Moldova) Alexandra Perper (Spain) Olga Sáez Larra	(Spain) Georgina García Pérez (Brazil) Laura Pigossi (Spain) Paula Arias Manjón (Romania) Miriam Bianca Bulgaru
November 28	Hua Hin, Thailand; Hard $10,000; Singles and Doubles draws	(Cambodia) Andrea Ka; 4–6, 6–0, 7–6^{(7–0)}	(Chinese Taipei) Hsu Chieh-yu	(Japan) Mai Hontama (Thailand) Bunyawi Thamchaiwat	(Serbia) Natalija Kostić (Thailand) Chompoothip Jandakate (South Korea) Lee So-ra (Thailand) Nudnida Luangnam
November 28	Hua Hin, Thailand; Hard $10,000; Singles and Doubles draws	(Thailand) Nudnida Luangnam (Thailand) Varunya Wongteanchai; 7–5, 6–3	(Japan) Mai Hontama (Japan) Yukina Saigo	(Japan) Mai Hontama (Thailand) Bunyawi Thamchaiwat	(Serbia) Natalija Kostić (Thailand) Chompoothip Jandakate (South Korea) Lee So-ra (Thailand) Nudnida Luangnam
November 28	Hammamet, Tunisia; Clay $10,000; Singles and Doubles draws	(Brazil) Carolina Alves; 6–3, 6–0	(Italy) Gaia Sanesi	(Italy) Federica Arcidiacono (Italy) Camilla Scala	(Russia) Yulia Kulikova (Poland) Patrycja Polańska (Belgium) Margaux Bovy (Switzerland) Sara Ottomano
November 28	Hammamet, Tunisia; Clay $10,000; Singles and Doubles draws	(Brazil) Carolina Alves (Serbia) Tamara Čurović; 6–1, 3–6, [10–8]	(Romania) Oana Gavrilă (Slovakia) Sandra Jamrichová	(Italy) Federica Arcidiacono (Italy) Camilla Scala	(Russia) Yulia Kulikova (Poland) Patrycja Polańska (Belgium) Margaux Bovy (Switzerland) Sara Ottomano
November 28	Antalya, Turkey; Clay $10,000; Singles and Doubles draws	(Hungary) Ágnes Bukta; 6–4, 2–6, 6–4	(Hungary) Vanda Lukács	(Turkey) Ayla Aksu (Bulgaria) Dia Evtimova	(Turkey) Melis Sezer (Ukraine) Anastasiya Shoshyna (Norway) Ulrikke Eikeri (Zimbabwe) Valeria Bhunu
November 28	Antalya, Turkey; Clay $10,000; Singles and Doubles draws	(Hungary) Ágnes Bukta (Ukraine) Anastasiya Shoshyna; 6–2, 4–6, [10–7]	(Bulgaria) Ani Vangelova (United States) Caitlyn Williams	(Turkey) Ayla Aksu (Bulgaria) Dia Evtimova	(Turkey) Melis Sezer (Ukraine) Anastasiya Shoshyna (Norway) Ulrikke Eikeri (Zimbabwe) Valeria Bhunu

=== December ===
Week of	Tournament	Winner	Runners-up	Semifinalists	Quarterfinalists
December 5	La Paz, Bolivia; Clay $10,000; Singles and Doubles draws	(Mexico) Victoria Rodríguez; 6–1, 7–6^{(7–5)}	(Argentina) Victoria Bosio	(Chile) Bárbara Gatica (Chile) Ivania Martinich	(Brazil) Thaísa Grana Pedretti (Brazil) Nathaly Kurata (Paraguay) Camila Giangreco Campiz (United States) Stephanie Nemtsova
December 5	La Paz, Bolivia; Clay $10,000; Singles and Doubles draws	(Argentina) Victoria Bosio (Mexico) Victoria Rodríguez; 7–6^{(7–2)}, 6–4	(United States) Stephanie Nemtsova (Brazil) Thaísa Grana Pedretti	(Chile) Bárbara Gatica (Chile) Ivania Martinich	(Brazil) Thaísa Grana Pedretti (Brazil) Nathaly Kurata (Paraguay) Camila Giangreco Campiz (United States) Stephanie Nemtsova
December 5	Djibouti City, Djibouti; Hard $10,000; Singles and Doubles draws	(Russia) Margarita Lazareva; 7–6^{(12–10)}, 6–3	(India) Riya Bhatia	(Netherlands) Phillis Vanenburg (France) Kassandra Davesne	(France) Kélia Le Bihan (France) Emmanuelle Salas (United States) Alexandra Riley (Ukraine) Oleksandra Piskun
December 5	Djibouti City, Djibouti; Hard $10,000; Singles and Doubles draws	(India) Riya Bhatia (France) Kassandra Davesne; 6–4, 6–4	(Russia) Margarita Lazareva (France) Kélia Le Bihan	(Netherlands) Phillis Vanenburg (France) Kassandra Davesne	(France) Kélia Le Bihan (France) Emmanuelle Salas (United States) Alexandra Riley (Ukraine) Oleksandra Piskun
December 5	Cairo, Egypt; Clay $10,000; Singles and Doubles draws	(Russia) Veronica Miroshnichenko; 6–2, 6–2	(Portugal) Inês Murta	(Chinese Taipei) Lee Pei-chi (Serbia) Bojana Marinković	(United States) Madison Bourguignon (Serbia) Barbara Bonić (Egypt) Lamis Alhussein Abdel Aziz (United Kingdom) Suzy Larkin
December 5	Cairo, Egypt; Clay $10,000; Singles and Doubles draws	(Chinese Taipei) Lee Pei-chi (Portugal) Inês Murta; 6–1, 6–0	(Germany) Lisa-Marie Mätschke (Austria) Kerstin Peckl	(Chinese Taipei) Lee Pei-chi (Serbia) Bojana Marinković	(United States) Madison Bourguignon (Serbia) Barbara Bonić (Egypt) Lamis Alhussein Abdel Aziz (United Kingdom) Suzy Larkin
December 5	Solapur, India; Hard $10,000; Singles and Doubles draws	(Latvia) Diāna Marcinkēviča; 6–3, 7–6^{(7–4)}	(Russia) Anastasia Gasanova	(Chinese Taipei) Hsu Chieh-yu (India) Zeel Desai	(Egypt) Ola Abou Zekry (India) Snehadevi Reddy (United States) Chanelle Van Nguyen (India) Karman Kaur Thandi
December 5	Solapur, India; Hard $10,000; Singles and Doubles draws	(Russia) Anastasia Gasanova (Belarus) Sviatlana Pirazhenka; 6–4, 7–5	(Egypt) Ola Abou Zekry (Russia) Anastasia Pribylova	(Chinese Taipei) Hsu Chieh-yu (India) Zeel Desai	(Egypt) Ola Abou Zekry (India) Snehadevi Reddy (United States) Chanelle Van Nguyen (India) Karman Kaur Thandi
December 5	Ramat Gan, Israel; Hard $10,000; Singles and Doubles draws	(Russia) Marta Paigina; 6–2, 6–1	(Israel) Deniz Khazaniuk	(Czech Republic) Miriam Kolodziejová (Israel) Vlada Ekshibarova	(France) Pauline Payet (Israel) Ofri Lankri (Russia) Ekaterina Yashina (Romania) Daiana Negreanu
December 5	Ramat Gan, Israel; Hard $10,000; Singles and Doubles draws	(Israel) Vlada Ekshibarova (Russia) Ekaterina Yashina; 6–4, 6–3	(Russia) Sofia Dmitrieva (Russia) Anna Pribylova	(Czech Republic) Miriam Kolodziejová (Israel) Vlada Ekshibarova	(France) Pauline Payet (Israel) Ofri Lankri (Russia) Ekaterina Yashina (Romania) Daiana Negreanu
December 5	Internazionali Tennis Val Gardena Südtirol; Ortisei, Italy; Hard (indoor) $10,000; Singles and Doubles draws	(Romania) Laura-Ioana Andrei; 6–2, 6–7^{(5–7)}, 6–4	(Italy) Deborah Chiesa	(Germany) Caroline Werner (Italy) Anna Remondina	(Switzerland) Simona Waltert (Kyrgyzstan) Ksenia Palkina Ulukan (Switzerland) Susan Bandecchi (Germany) Sarah-Rebecca Sekulic
December 5	Internazionali Tennis Val Gardena Südtirol; Ortisei, Italy; Hard (indoor) $10,000; Singles and Doubles draws	(Romania) Laura-Ioana Andrei (Germany) Sarah-Rebecca Sekulic; 6–2, 6–3	(Kyrgyzstan) Ksenia Palkina Ulukan (Italy) Anna Remondina	(Germany) Caroline Werner (Italy) Anna Remondina	(Switzerland) Simona Waltert (Kyrgyzstan) Ksenia Palkina Ulukan (Switzerland) Susan Bandecchi (Germany) Sarah-Rebecca Sekulic
December 5	Nules, Spain; Clay $10,000; Singles and Doubles draws	(Spain) Olga Sáez Larra; 6–2, 4–6, 6–2	(Ukraine) Oleksandra Korashvili	(Venezuela) Andrea Gámiz (Ecuador) Charlotte Römer	(Spain) María Gutiérrez Carrasco (China) Cao Siqi (Spain) Irene Burillo Escorihuela (Spain) Ainhoa Atucha Gómez
December 5	Nules, Spain; Clay $10,000; Singles and Doubles draws	(Ecuador) Charlotte Römer (Spain) Olga Sáez Larra; 6–4, 6–2	(Ukraine) Oleksandra Korashvili (Brazil) Laura Pigossi	(Venezuela) Andrea Gámiz (Ecuador) Charlotte Römer	(Spain) María Gutiérrez Carrasco (China) Cao Siqi (Spain) Irene Burillo Escorihuela (Spain) Ainhoa Atucha Gómez
December 5	Hammamet, Tunisia; Clay $10,000; Singles and Doubles draws	(Greece) Valentini Grammatikopoulou; 6–1, 6–3	(Bosnia and Herzegovina) Jelena Simić	(Brazil) Carolina Alves (Slovakia) Sandra Jamrichová	(Italy) Dalila Spiteri (Slovenia) Nina Potočnik (Italy) Federica Arcidiacono (France) Jade Suvrijn
December 5	Hammamet, Tunisia; Clay $10,000; Singles and Doubles draws	(Brazil) Carolina Alves (Serbia) Tamara Čurović; 6–3, 6–2	(Romania) Oana Gavrilă (Slovakia) Sandra Jamrichová	(Brazil) Carolina Alves (Slovakia) Sandra Jamrichová	(Italy) Dalila Spiteri (Slovenia) Nina Potočnik (Italy) Federica Arcidiacono (France) Jade Suvrijn
December 5	Antalya, Turkey; Clay $10,000; Singles and Doubles draws	(Germany) Tayisiya Morderger; 7–5, 6–1	(Bulgaria) Dia Evtimova	(Norway) Ulrikke Eikeri (Ukraine) Anastasiya Shoshyna	(Germany) Yana Morderger (Zimbabwe) Valeria Bhunu (Bosnia and Herzegovina) Ema Burgić Bucko (Turkey) Melis Sezer
December 5	Antalya, Turkey; Clay $10,000; Singles and Doubles draws	(Bosnia and Herzegovina) Ema Burgić Bucko (Norway) Ulrikke Eikeri; 6–4, 6–1	(Ukraine) Maryna Chernyshova (Russia) Anna Ukolova	(Norway) Ulrikke Eikeri (Ukraine) Anastasiya Shoshyna	(Germany) Yana Morderger (Zimbabwe) Valeria Bhunu (Bosnia and Herzegovina) Ema Burgić Bucko (Turkey) Melis Sezer
December 12	Al Habtoor Tennis Challenge; Dubai, United Arab Emirates; Hard $100,000+H; Singles – Doubles	(Chinese Taipei) Hsieh Su-wei; 6–2, 6–2	(Russia) Natalia Vikhlyantseva	(Germany) Mona Barthel (Netherlands) Lesley Kerkhove	(Serbia) Aleksandra Krunić (Serbia) Ivana Jorović (Uzbekistan) Sabina Sharipova (Kazakhstan) Galina Voskoboeva
December 12	Al Habtoor Tennis Challenge; Dubai, United Arab Emirates; Hard $100,000+H; Singles – Doubles	(Luxembourg) Mandy Minella (Serbia) Nina Stojanović; 6–3, 3–6, [10–4]	(Chinese Taipei) Hsieh Su-wei (Russia) Valeria Savinykh	(Germany) Mona Barthel (Netherlands) Lesley Kerkhove	(Serbia) Aleksandra Krunić (Serbia) Ivana Jorović (Uzbekistan) Sabina Sharipova (Kazakhstan) Galina Voskoboeva
December 12	NECC–ITF Women's Tennis Championships; Pune, India; Hard $25,000; Singles and Doubles draws	(Slovenia) Tamara Zidanšek; 6–4, 6–2	(Russia) Polina Monova	(Thailand) Noppawan Lertcheewakarn (United Kingdom) Katy Dunne	(Switzerland) Conny Perrin (India) Karman Kaur Thandi (Japan) Akiko Omae (Russia) Anastasia Pribylova
December 12	NECC–ITF Women's Tennis Championships; Pune, India; Hard $25,000; Singles and Doubles draws	(Indonesia) Beatrice Gumulya (Montenegro) Ana Veselinović; 6–4, 6–3	(Thailand) Kamonwan Buayam (United Kingdom) Katy Dunne	(Thailand) Noppawan Lertcheewakarn (United Kingdom) Katy Dunne	(Switzerland) Conny Perrin (India) Karman Kaur Thandi (Japan) Akiko Omae (Russia) Anastasia Pribylova
December 12	Santa Cruz, Bolivia; Clay $10,000; Singles and Doubles draws	(Mexico) Victoria Rodríguez; 6–4, 6–3	(Chile) Fernanda Brito	(Brazil) Gabriela Cé (Brazil) Nathaly Kurata	(Paraguay) Camila Giangreco Campiz (Bolivia) Noelia Zeballos (Brazil) Thaísa Grana Pedretti (Paraguay) Lara Escauriza
December 12	Santa Cruz, Bolivia; Clay $10,000; Singles and Doubles draws	(Chile) Fernanda Brito (Paraguay) Camila Giangreco Campiz; 6–2, 7–5	(Argentina) Victoria Bosio (Mexico) Victoria Rodríguez	(Brazil) Gabriela Cé (Brazil) Nathaly Kurata	(Paraguay) Camila Giangreco Campiz (Bolivia) Noelia Zeballos (Brazil) Thaísa Grana Pedretti (Paraguay) Lara Escauriza
December 12	Djibouti City, Djibouti; Hard $10,000; Singles and Doubles draws	(Russia) Margarita Lazareva; 6–2, 6–2	(India) Riya Bhatia	(India) Shivika Burman (Netherlands) Phillis Vanenburg	(France) Kélia Le Bihan (France) Emmanuelle Salas (United States) Rushri Wijesundera (France) Kassandra Davesne
December 12	Djibouti City, Djibouti; Hard $10,000; Singles and Doubles draws	(France) Kassandra Davesne (France) Kélia Le Bihan; 6–3, 4–6, [10–8]	(India) Riya Bhatia (Russia) Margarita Lazareva	(India) Shivika Burman (Netherlands) Phillis Vanenburg	(France) Kélia Le Bihan (France) Emmanuelle Salas (United States) Rushri Wijesundera (France) Kassandra Davesne
December 12	Cairo, Egypt; Clay $10,000; Singles and Doubles draws	(Russia) Veronica Miroshnichenko; 1–6, 6–4, 7–6^{(7–5)}	(France) Victoria Muntean	(Serbia) Bojana Marinković (Germany) Lisa-Marie Mätschke	(Egypt) Nermeen Shawky (United Kingdom) Suzy Larkin (Egypt) Farah Abdel-Wahab (Sweden) Fanny Östlund
December 12	Cairo, Egypt; Clay $10,000; Singles and Doubles draws	(Germany) Lisa-Marie Mätschke (Romania) Anna Popescu; 3–6, 6–0, [10–7]	(Ukraine) Anastasiia Gevel (Ukraine) Yuliia Starodubtseva	(Serbia) Bojana Marinković (Germany) Lisa-Marie Mätschke	(Egypt) Nermeen Shawky (United Kingdom) Suzy Larkin (Egypt) Farah Abdel-Wahab (Sweden) Fanny Östlund
December 12	Casablanca, Morocco; Clay $10,000; Singles and Doubles draws	(Romania) Cristina Ene; 6–3, 6–2	(Romania) Oana Georgeta Simion	(France) Joséphine Boualem (Romania) Ioana Loredana Roșca	(France) Alice Bacquié (Romania) Daiana Negreanu (Greece) Eleni Kordolaimi (Belgium) Déborah Kerfs
December 12	Casablanca, Morocco; Clay $10,000; Singles and Doubles draws	(Romania) Daiana Negreanu (Russia) Yana Sizikova; 6–4, 6–2	(Belgium) Déborah Kerfs (Romania) Ioana Loredana Roșca	(France) Joséphine Boualem (Romania) Ioana Loredana Roșca	(France) Alice Bacquié (Romania) Daiana Negreanu (Greece) Eleni Kordolaimi (Belgium) Déborah Kerfs
December 12	Hammamet, Tunisia; Clay $10,000; Singles and Doubles draws	(Brazil) Carolina Alves; 6–0, 4–6, 7–5	(Bosnia and Herzegovina) Jelena Simić	(Serbia) Tamara Čurović (Italy) Bianca Turati	(Sweden) Ida Jarlskog (Romania) Andreea Amalia Roșca (Germany) Julyette Steur (France) Audrey Albié
December 12	Hammamet, Tunisia; Clay $10,000; Singles and Doubles draws	(Serbia) Tamara Čurović (Bosnia and Herzegovina) Jelena Simić; Walkover	(France) Audrey Albié (France) Jade Suvrijn	(Serbia) Tamara Čurović (Italy) Bianca Turati	(Sweden) Ida Jarlskog (Romania) Andreea Amalia Roșca (Germany) Julyette Steur (France) Audrey Albié
December 12	Antalya, Turkey; Clay $10,000; Singles and Doubles draws	(Ukraine) Kateryna Sliusar; 6–2, 6–4	(Ukraine) Oleksandra Andrieieva	(Bosnia and Herzegovina) Ema Burgić Bucko (Germany) Tayisiya Morderger	(Russia) Maria Marfutina (Germany) Yana Morderger (Bulgaria) Julia Stamatova (Norway) Ulrikke Eikeri
December 12	Antalya, Turkey; Clay $10,000; Singles and Doubles draws	(Bosnia and Herzegovina) Ema Burgić Bucko (Norway) Ulrikke Eikeri; 6–1, 6–1	(Poland) Sonia Grzywocz (United States) Caitlyn Williams	(Bosnia and Herzegovina) Ema Burgić Bucko (Germany) Tayisiya Morderger	(Russia) Maria Marfutina (Germany) Yana Morderger (Bulgaria) Julia Stamatova (Norway) Ulrikke Eikeri
December 19	Ankara Cup; Ankara, Turkey; Hard (indoor) $50,000; Singles – Doubles	(Serbia) Ivana Jorović; 6–4, 7–5	(Russia) Vitalia Diatchenko	(Belarus) Aryna Sabalenka (Romania) Alexandra Cadanțu	(Romania) Mihaela Buzărnescu (Russia) Maria Marfutina (Poland) Paula Kania (Bulgaria) Elitsa Kostova
December 19	Ankara Cup; Ankara, Turkey; Hard (indoor) $50,000; Singles – Doubles	(Russia) Anna Blinkova (Belarus) Lidziya Marozava; 4–6, 6–3, [11–9]	(Uzbekistan) Sabina Sharipova (Russia) Ekaterina Yashina	(Belarus) Aryna Sabalenka (Romania) Alexandra Cadanțu	(Romania) Mihaela Buzărnescu (Russia) Maria Marfutina (Poland) Paula Kania (Bulgaria) Elitsa Kostova
December 19	Navi Mumbai, India; Hard $25,000; Singles and Doubles draws	(China) Lu Jiajing; 6–3, 6–1	(Slovenia) Tamara Zidanšek	(South Korea) Kim Na-ri (Ukraine) Valeriya Strakhova	(Thailand) Noppawan Lertcheewakarn (Japan) Akiko Omae (United Kingdom) Katy Dunne (France) Tessah Andrianjafitrimo
December 19	Navi Mumbai, India; Hard $25,000; Singles and Doubles draws	(South Korea) Choi Ji-hee (South Korea) Kim Na-ri; 7–5, 6–1	(Belarus) Sviatlana Pirazhenka (Russia) Anastasia Pribylova	(South Korea) Kim Na-ri (Ukraine) Valeriya Strakhova	(Thailand) Noppawan Lertcheewakarn (Japan) Akiko Omae (United Kingdom) Katy Dunne (France) Tessah Andrianjafitrimo
December 19	Casablanca, Morocco; Clay $10,000; Singles and Doubles draws	(Hungary) Panna Udvardy; 6–4, 7–6^{(7–3)}	(Greece) Eleni Kordolaimi	(France) Margot Yerolymos (Romania) Oana Georgeta Simion	(Bulgaria) Petia Arshinkova (Romania) Ioana Loredana Roșca (Belgium) Déborah Kerfs (Russia) Yana Sizikova
December 19	Casablanca, Morocco; Clay $10,000; Singles and Doubles draws	(Germany) Katharina Hering (Spain) Olga Parres Azcoitia; 6–1, 6–2	(Belgium) Déborah Kerfs (Russia) Yana Sizikova	(France) Margot Yerolymos (Romania) Oana Georgeta Simion	(Bulgaria) Petia Arshinkova (Romania) Ioana Loredana Roșca (Belgium) Déborah Kerfs (Russia) Yana Sizikova
December 26	Hong Kong; Hard $10,000; Singles and Doubles draws	(Russia) Olga Doroshina; 2–6, 6–4, 6–2	(Thailand) Nudnida Luangnam	(Hong Kong) Zhang Ling (India) Karman Kaur Thandi	(Japan) Chihiro Muramatsu (France) Harmony Tan (United States) Yuki Kristina Chiang (Japan) Ayaka Okuno
December 26	Hong Kong; Hard $10,000; Singles and Doubles draws	(Japan) Mai Minokoshi (South Korea) Park Sang-hee; 4–6, 6–4, [10–7]	(China) Xun Fangying (China) Zhang Ying	(Hong Kong) Zhang Ling (India) Karman Kaur Thandi	(Japan) Chihiro Muramatsu (France) Harmony Tan (United States) Yuki Kristina Chiang (Japan) Ayaka Okuno
December 26	Rabat, Morocco; Clay $10,000; Singles and Doubles draws	(France) Joséphine Boualem; 2–6, 7–6^{(7–1)}, 6–4	(Hungary) Panna Udvardy	(Romania) Michele Alexandra Zmău (France) Victoria Muntean	(Russia) Vasilisa Aponasenko (Spain) Claudia Hoste Ferrer (Germany) Katharina Hering (United States) Hind Abdelouahid
December 26	Rabat, Morocco; Clay $10,000; Singles and Doubles draws	(Russia) Ksenia Laskutova (France) Victoria Muntean; 6–1, 6–1	(Italy) Jessica Bertoldo (Italy) Sara Marcionni	(Romania) Michele Alexandra Zmău (France) Victoria Muntean	(Russia) Vasilisa Aponasenko (Spain) Claudia Hoste Ferrer (Germany) Katharina Hering (United States) Hind Abdelouahid
