= 2016 Ankara Cup – Doubles =

Doubles
- 2016 Ankara Cup

Final
- Champions: (Russia) Anna Blinkova (Belarus) Lidziya Marozava
- Runners-up: (Uzbekistan) Sabina Sharipova (Russia) Ekaterina Yashina
- Score: 4–6, 6–3, [11–9]

Events
Singles	Doubles
- Ankara Cup

María José Martínez Sánchez and Marina Melnikova were the defending champions, but Martínez Sánchez chose not to participate. Melnikova partnered Paula Kania, but they lost in the quarterfinals to Elitsa Kostova and Cornelia Lister.

Anna Blinkova and Lidziya Marozava won the title, defeating Sabina Sharipova and Ekaterina Yashina in the final, 4–6, 6–3, [11–9].

== Seeds ==
1. (Poland) Paula Kania / (Russia) Marina Melnikova (quarterfinals)
2. (Russia) Veronika Kudermetova / (Bulgaria) Aleksandrina Naydenova (quarterfinals)
3. (Romania) Alexandra Cadanțu / (Russia) Anastasiya Komardina (quarterfinals)
4. (Turkey) Melis Sezer / (Turkey) İpek Soylu (quarterfinals; withdrew)

== Draw ==
Key

- Q = Qualifier
- WC = Wild card
- LL = Lucky loser
- Alt = Alternate
- ITF = ITF entry
- PR = Protected ranking
- SR = Special ranking
- SE = Special exempt
- JE = Junior exempt
- JR = Junior Accelerator Programme entrant
- CO = College Accelerator Programme entrant
- NG = Next Gen Accelerator Program entrant
- w/o = Walkover
- r = Retired
- d = Defaulted

First round
1	(Poland) P Kania (Russia) M Melnikova	6	7^{7}
(Turkey) A Aksu (Turkey) B Eraydın	4	6^{5}
WC	(Turkey) İ Öz (Turkey) İr Soylu	2	0
(Bulgaria) E Kostova (Sweden) C Lister	6	6
3	(Romania) A Cadanțu (Russia) A Komardina	6	6
(Bosnia and Herzegovina) A Husarić (Serbia) I Jorović	3	2
(Serbia) B Bonić (Bosnia and Herzegovina) D Herdželaš	2	3
(Russia) A Blinkova (Belarus) L Marozava	6	6
(Ukraine) A Fomina (Georgia (country)) E Gorgodze	6	6
WC	(Turkey) B Cengiz (Turkey) S Övünç	3	2
WC	(Turkey) B Akbaş (Turkey) D Paykoç	1	1
4	(Turkey) M Sezer (Turkey) İp Soylu	6	6
(Israel) V Ekshibarova (Russia) M Marfutina	4	3
(Uzbekistan) S Sharipova (Russia) E Yashina	6	6
(Romania) E Bogdan (Romania) M Buzărnescu	1	2
2	(Russia) V Kudermetova (Bulgaria) A Naydenova	6	6

Quarterfinals
1	(Poland) P Kania (Russia) M Melnikova	5	3
(Bulgaria) E Kostova (Sweden) C Lister	7	6
3	(Romania) A Cadanțu (Russia) A Komardina	2	2
(Russia) A Blinkova (Belarus) L Marozava	6	6
(Ukraine) A Fomina (Georgia (country)) E Gorgodze	w/o
4	(Turkey) M Sezer (Turkey) İp Soylu
(Uzbekistan) S Sharipova (Russia) E Yashina	7	3	[10]
2	(Russia) V Kudermetova (Bulgaria) A Naydenova	5	6	[6]

Semifinals
(Bulgaria) E Kostova (Sweden) C Lister
(Russia) A Blinkova (Belarus) L Marozava	w/o
(Ukraine) A Fomina (Georgia (country)) E Gorgodze	3	6^{4}
(Uzbekistan) S Sharipova (Russia) E Yashina	6	7^{7}

Final
(Russia) A Blinkova (Belarus) L Marozava	4	6	[11]
(Uzbekistan) S Sharipova (Russia) E Yashina	6	3	[9]
