= 2016 Ankara Cup – Singles =

Singles
- 2016 Ankara Cup

Final
- Champion: (Serbia) Ivana Jorović
- Runner-up: (Russia) Vitalia Diatchenko
- Score: 6–4, 7–5

Events
Singles	Doubles
- Ankara Cup

Ivana Jorović was the defending champion and successfully defended her title, defeating Vitalia Diatchenko in the final, 6–4, 7–5.

== Seeds ==
1. (Belarus) Aryna Sabalenka (semifinals)
2. (Bulgaria) Elitsa Kostova (quarterfinals)
3. (Uzbekistan) Sabina Sharipova (second round)
4. (Serbia) Ivana Jorović (champion)
5. (Turkey) İpek Soylu (second round, retired)
6. (Sweden) Susanne Celik (second round; withdrew)
7. (Russia) Viktoria Kamenskaya (first round)
8. (Russia) Anna Blinkova (second round)

== Main draw ==
Key

- Q = Qualifier
- WC = Wild card
- LL = Lucky loser
- Alt = Alternate
- ITF = ITF entry
- PR = Protected ranking
- SR = Special ranking
- SE = Special exempt
- JE = Junior exempt
- JR = Junior Accelerator Programme entrant
- CO = College Accelerator Programme entrant
- NG = Next Gen Accelerator Program entrant
- w/o = Walkover
- r = Retired
- d = Defaulted

=== Finals ===
Semifinals
1	(Belarus) Aryna Sabalenka	5	7^{7}	6^{4}
4	(Serbia) Ivana Jorović	7	6^{2}	7^{7}
PR	(Russia) Vitalia Diatchenko	5
(Romania) Alexandra Cadanțu	0^{r}

Final
4	(Serbia) Ivana Jorović	6	7
PR	(Russia) Vitalia Diatchenko	4	5

=== Top half ===
First round
1	(Belarus) A Sabalenka	6	6
WC	(Turkey) S Övünç	2	2
Q	(Croatia) A Vrljić	3	2
(Georgia (country)) E Gorgodze	6	6
Q	(Romania) M Buzărnescu	6	6
Q	(Ukraine) G Poznikhirenko	4	1
WC	(Turkey) A Aksu	3	6	6
7	(Russia) V Kamenskaya	6	3	3
4	(Serbia) I Jorović	6	6
(Poland) M Fręch	3	3
LL	(Russia) E Yashina	5	0
(Russia) V Kudermetova	7	6
LL	(Russia) M Marfutina	6	6
WC	(Turkey) İ Öz	2	3
(Russia) P Leykina	5	6^{1}
5	(Turkey) İ Soylu	7	7^{7}

Second round
1	(Belarus) A Sabalenka	6	6
(Georgia (country)) E Gorgodze	1	1
Q	(Romania) M Buzărnescu	7	6
WC	(Turkey) A Aksu	5	3
4	(Serbia) I Jorović	6	7^{11}
(Russia) V Kudermetova	3	6^{9}
LL	(Russia) M Marfutina	6^{6}	4
5	(Turkey) İ Soylu	7^{8}	1^{r}

Quarterfinals
1	(Belarus) A Sabalenka	7^{11}	6
Q	(Romania) M Buzărnescu	6^{9}	4
4	(Serbia) I Jorović	7^{7}	6
LL	(Russia) M Marfutina	6^{3}	0

Semifinals
1	(Belarus) A Sabalenka	5	7^{7}	6^{4}
4	(Serbia) I Jorović	7	6^{2}	7^{7}

=== Bottom half ===
First round
6	(Sweden) S Celik	1	6	6
(Russia) M Melnikova	6	4	2
Q	(Romania) RG Șerban	3	6	4
(Poland) P Kania	6	0	6
PR	(Russia) V Diatchenko	7^{7}	7
(Czech Republic) K Muchová	6^{5}	5
WC	(Turkey) B Cengiz	6	6^{6}	3
3	(Uzbekistan) S Sharipova	3	7^{8}	6
8	(Russia) A Blinkova	7^{9}	7^{7}
(Romania) C Dinu	6^{7}	6^{4}
(Russia) A Komardina	1	4
(Romania) A Cadanțu	6	6
(Georgia (country)) S Shapatava	6	6
(Czech Republic) B Krejčíková	2	3
(Bulgaria) A Naydenova	7^{7}	5	5
2	(Bulgaria) E Kostova	6^{1}	7	7

Second round
6	(Sweden) S Celik
(Poland) P Kania	w/o
PR	(Russia) V Diatchenko	6	7
3	(Uzbekistan) S Sharipova	3	5
8	(Russia) A Blinkova	6	4	2
(Romania) A Cadanțu	4	6	6
(Georgia (country)) S Shapatava	7^{7}	4	4
2	(Bulgaria) E Kostova	6^{2}	6	6

Quarterfinals
(Poland) P Kania	2	1
PR	(Russia) V Diatchenko	6	6
(Romania) A Cadanțu	6	1	6
2	(Bulgaria) E Kostova	4	6	2

Semifinals
PR	(Russia) V Diatchenko	5
(Romania) A Cadanțu	0^{r}
