= 2016 Ankara Cup =

Indoor hard court tennis tournament

- Date: 19–25 December
- Edition: 6th
- Category: ITF Women's Circuit
- Prize money: $50,000
- Surface: Hard / Indoor
- Location: Ankara, Turkey

Champions

Singles
- (Serbia) Ivana Jorović

Doubles
- (Russia) Anna Blinkova / (Belarus) Lidziya Marozava
- Ankara Cup

The 2016 TEB Ankara Cup was a professional tennis tournament played on indoor hard courts. It was the sixth edition of the tournament and part of the 2016 ITF Women's Circuit, offering a total of $50,000 in prize money. It took place in Ankara, Turkey, from 19–25 December 2016.

== Singles main draw entrants ==
=== Seeds ===
Country	Player	Rank^{1}	Seed
BLR	Aryna Sabalenka	135	1
BUL	Elitsa Kostova	139	2
UZB	Sabina Sharipova	153	3
SRB	Ivana Jorović	157	4
TUR	İpek Soylu	159	5
SWE	Susanne Celik	180	6
RUS	Viktoria Kamenskaya	189	7
RUS	Anna Blinkova	201	8

- ^{1} Rankings as of 12 December 2016

=== Other entrants ===
The following players received wildcards into the singles main draw:

- (Turkey) Ayla Aksu
- (Turkey) Berfu Cengiz
- (Turkey) Selin Övünç
- (Turkey) İpek Öz

The following players received entry from the qualifying draw:

- (Romania) Mihaela Buzărnescu
- (Ukraine) Ganna Poznikhirenko
- (Romania) Raluca Georgiana Șerban
- (Croatia) Ana Vrljić

The following players received entry by lucky loser spots:

- (Russia) Maria Marfutina
- (Russia) Ekaterina Yashina

The following player received entry by using protected rankings:

- (Russia) Vitalia Diatchenko

== Champions ==
=== Singles ===
- (Serbia) Ivana Jorović def. (Russia) Vitalia Diatchenko, 6–4, 7–5

=== Doubles ===
- (Russia) Anna Blinkova / (Belarus) Lidziya Marozava def. (Uzbekistan) Sabina Sharipova / (Russia) Ekaterina Yashina, 4–6, 6–3, [11–9]
