= 2018 O1 Properties Ladies Cup =

- Date: 30 April–5 May
- Edition: 3rd
- Category: ITF Women's Circuit
- Prize money: $100,000
- Surface: Hard / Indoor
- Location: Khimki, Russia

Champions

Singles
- (Belarus) Vera Lapko

Doubles
- (Russia) Olga Doroshina / (Russia) Anastasiya Komardina
- O1 Properties Ladies Cup

The 2018 O1 Properties Ladies Cup was a professional tennis tournament played on indoor hard courts. It was the third edition of the tournament and was part of the 2018 ITF Women's Circuit. It took place in Khimki, Russia, on 30 April–5 May 2018.

== Singles main draw entrants ==
=== Seeds ===
Country	Player	Rank^{1}	Seed
ROU	Monica Niculescu	63	1
BLR	Vera Lapko	111	2
RUS	Evgeniya Rodina	118	3
AUS	Arina Rodionova	131	4
RUS	Vitalia Diatchenko	173	5
GRE	Valentini Grammatikopoulou	175	6
RUS	Polina Monova	196	7
SRB	Ivana Jorović	241	8

- ^{1} Rankings as of 23 April 2018.

=== Other entrants ===
The following players received a wildcard into the singles main draw:

- (Czech Republic) Anastasia Dețiuc
- (Russia) Varvara Flink
- (Russia) Margarita Gasparyan
- (Russia) Sofya Lansere

The following players received entry from the qualifying draw:

- (Russia) Angelina Gabueva
- (Russia) Anastasiya Komardina
- (Russia) Daria Mishina
- (Russia) Ekaterina Yashina

== Champions ==
=== Singles ===
- (Belarus) Vera Lapko def. (Russia) Anastasia Potapova, 6–1, 6–3

=== Doubles ===
- (Russia) Olga Doroshina / (Russia) Anastasiya Komardina def. (Russia) Veronika Pepelyaeva / (Russia) Anastasia Tikhonova, 6–1, 6–2
