= Maja Chwalińska career statistics =

Career finals
Discipline	Type	Won	Lost	Total
Singles	Grand Slam	–	1	–
Singles	WTA Finals	–	–	–
Singles	WTA 1000	1	–	–
Singles	WTA 500	–	–	–
Singles	WTA 250	–	–	–
Singles	Olympics	–	–	–
Singles	Total	0	2	2
Doubles	Grand Slam	–	–	–
Doubles	WTA Finals	–	–	–
Doubles	WTA 1000	–	–	–
Doubles	WTA 500	–	–	–
Doubles	WTA 250	–	–	–
Doubles	Olympics	–	–	–
Doubles	Total	0	0	0

This is a list of career statistics of Polish tennis player Maja Chwalińska.

== Performance timeline ==
Key
W	F	SF	QF	#R	RR	Q#	P#	DNQ	A	Z#	PO	G	S	B	NMS	NTI	P	NH

(W) winner; (F) finalist; (SF) semifinalist; (QF) quarterfinalist; (#R) rounds 4, 3, 2, 1; (RR) round-robin stage; (Q#) qualification round; (P#) preliminary round; (DNQ) did not qualify; (A) absent; (Z#) Davis/Fed Cup Zonal Group (with number indication) or (PO) play-off; (G) gold, (S) silver or (B) bronze Olympic/Paralympic medal; (NMS) not a Masters tournament; (NTI) not a Tier I tournament; (P) postponed; (NH) not held; (SR) strike rate (events won / competed); (W–L) win–loss record.
To avoid confusion and double counting, these charts are updated at the conclusion of a tournament or when the player's participation has ended.

=== Singles ===
Current through the 2026 Wuhan Open.

Tournament	2020	2021	2022	2023	2024	2025	2026	SR	W–L	Win %
Grand Slam tournaments
Australian Open	Q1	Q1	A	A	A	1R	Q3	0 / 1	0–1	0%
French Open	A	Q1	A	Q2	A	Q2	F	0 / 1	6–1	86%
Wimbledon	NH	Q1	2R	Q1	A	Q1	1R	0 / 2	1–2	33%
US Open	A	A	Q2	A	Q1	Q2	1R	0 / 1	0–1	0%
Win–Loss	0–0	0–0	1–1	0–0	0–0	0–1	6–3	0 / 5	7–5	58%
WTA 1000 tournaments
Qatar Open	A	NTI	A	NTI	A	A	A	0 / 0	0–0	–
Dubai Open	NTI	A	NTI	A	A	A	A	0 / 0	0–0	–
Indian Wells Open	NH	A	A	A	A	A	A	0 / 0	0–0	0%
Miami Open	NH	A	A	A	A	A	A	0 / 0	0–0	–
Madrid Open	NH	A	A	A	A	Q1	A	0 / 0	0–0	–
Italian Open	A	A	A	A	A	Q2	A	0 / 0	0–0	0%
Canadian Open	NH	A	A	A	A	A	2R	0 / 1	0–1	0%
Cincinnati Open	A	A	A	A	A	A	3R	0 / 1	1–1	50%
China Open	NH			A	A	A	2R	0 / 1	0–1	0%
Wuhan Open	NH				A	A	W	1 / 1	6–0	100%
Win–Loss	0–0	0–0	0–0	0–0	0–0	0–0	7–3	1 / 4	7–3	70%
Year-end ranking	220	343	154	349	165	133	12			

== Grand Slam tournament finals ==
=== Singles: 1 (runner-up) ===
Result	Year	Tournament	Surface	Opponent	Score
Loss	2026	French Open	Clay	Mirra Andreeva	3–6, 2–6

== Other significant finals ==
=== WTA 1000 tournaments ===
==== Singles: 1 (title) ====
Result	Year	Tournament	Surface	Opponent	Score
Win	2026	Wuhan Open	Hard	(United Kingdom) Sonay Kartal	2–6, 6–4, 6–2

== WTA Tour finals ==
=== Singles: 2 (1 title, 1 runner-up) ===
Legend Grand Slam (0–1) WTA 1000 (1–0)	Finals by surface Hard (1–0) Clay (0–1)	Finals by setting Outdoor (1–1)

Result	W–L	Date	Tournament	Tier	Surface	Opponent	Score
Loss	0–1	Jun 2026	French Open, France	Grand Slam	Clay	Mirra Andreeva	3–6, 2–6
Win	1–1	Oct 2026	Wuhan Open, China	WTA 1000	Hard	(United Kingdom) Sonay Kartal	2–6, 6–4, 6–2

== WTA 125 finals ==
=== Singles: 3 (3 titles) ===
Result	W–L	Date	Tournament	Surface	Opponent	Score
Win	1–0	Dec 2024	Florianópolis Open, Brazil	Clay	(Switzerland) Ylena In-Albon	6–1, 6–2
Win	2–0	Sep 2025	Montreux Ladies Open, Switzerland	Clay	(Latvia) Darja Semeņistaja	6–1, 6–2
Win	3–0	Apr 2026	Oeiras Ladies Open, Portugal	Clay	(Austria) Sinja Kraus	6–1, 6–3

=== Doubles: 5 (3 titles, 2 runner-ups) ===
Result	W–L	Date	Tournament	Surface	Partner	Opponents	Score
Win	1–0	Nov 2024	Buenos Aires Open, Argentina	Clay	(Poland) Katarzyna Kawa	(Brazil) Laura Pigossi (Egypt) Mayar Sherif	6–4, 3–6, [10–7]
Win	2–0	Dec 2024	Florianópolis Open, Brazil	Clay	(Brazil) Laura Pigossi	(Italy) Nicole Fossa Huergo (Ukraine) Valeriya Strakhova	7–6^{(7–3)}, 6–3
Win	3–0	Mar 2025	Antalya Challenger, Turkey	Clay	(Czech Republic) Anastasia Dețiuc	(Czech Republic) Jesika Malečková (Czech Republic) Miriam Škoch	4–6, 6–3, [10–2]
Loss	3–1	Mar 2025	Antalya Challenger II, Turkey	Clay	(Czech Republic) Anastasia Dețiuc	(Switzerland) Simona Waltert (Argentina) María Lourdes Carlé	6–3, 5–7, [3–10]
Loss	3–2	Mar 2026	Antalya Challenger III, Turkey	Clay	(Czech Republic) Jesika Malečková	Maria Kozyreva; Iryna Shymanovich	6–7^{(7–9)}, 4–6

== ITF Circuit finals ==
=== Singles: 11 (7 titles, 4 runner-ups) ===
Legend W60/75 tournaments (4–2) W25 tournaments (3–1) W15 tournaments (0–1)	Finals by surface Hard (2–3) Clay (5–1)

Result	W–L	Date	Tournament	Tier	Surface	Opponent	Score
Loss	0–1	Feb 2017	ITF Birkenhead, UK	W15	Hard (i)	(United Kingdom) Maia Lumsden	4–6, 1–6
Win	1–1	Jul 2019	ITF Bytom, Poland	W25	Clay	(Slovenia) Nina Potočnik	6–3, 6–4
Win	2–1	Aug 2019	ITF Grodzisk Mazowiecki, Poland	W25	Clay	(Serbia) Dejana Radanović	7–6^{(7–5)}, 6–4
Win	3–1	Aug 2019	Warsaw Open, Poland	W60	Clay	(Russia) Anastasiya Komardina	6–3, 6–0
Win	4–1	Jan 2022	ITF Monastir, Tunisia	W25	Hard	(France) Carole Monnet	6–4, 6–4
Loss	4–2	Feb 2022	Porto Indoor, Portugal	W25	Hard (i)	(Austria) Julia Grabher	3–6, 7–6^{(7–2)}, 5–7
Win	5–2	May 2022	Prague Open, Czech Republic	W60	Clay	(Georgia (country)) Ekaterine Gorgodze	7–5, 6–3
Loss	5–3	Jan 2024	Porto Indoor, Portugal	W75+H	Hard (i)	(Spain) Jéssica Bouzas Maneiro	6–3, 0–6, 4–6
Loss	5–4	May 2024	Prague Open, Czech Republic	W75	Clay	(Czech Republic) Dominika Šalková	3–6, 0–6
Win	6–4	Jul 2024	Open de Montpellier, France	W75	Clay	Oksana Selekhmeteva	6–3, 6–2
Win	7–4	July 2024	Porto Open, Portugal	W75	Hard	(France) Tessah Andrianjafitrimo	7–5, 6–1

=== Doubles: 21 (11 titles, 10 runner-ups) ===
Legend W100 tournaments (0–1) W60/75 tournaments (6–1) W40/50 tournaments (0–1) W25/35 tournaments (4–6) W10/15 tournaments (1–1)	Finals by surface Hard (2–8) Clay (7–1) Grass (0–1) Carpet (2–0)

Result	W–L	Date	Tournament	Tier	Surface	Partner	Opponents	Score
Loss	0–1	Sep 2016	ITF Brno, Czech Republic	W10	Clay	(Poland) Paulina Czarnik	(Czech Republic) Aneta Kladivová (Czech Republic) Aneta Laboutková	6–7^{(5)}, 6–3, [10–12]
Win	1–1	Feb 2017	ITF Birkenhead, UK	W15	Hard (i)	(Japan) Miyabi Inoue	(United States) Emina Bektas (United States) Ronit Yurovsky	6–4, 6–4
Win	2–1	Jun 2018	Bella Cup Toruń, Poland	W25	Clay	(Poland) Katarzyna Kawa	(Uzbekistan) Albina Khabibulina (Belgium) Hélène Scholsen	6–1, 6–4
Win	3–1	Aug 2018	Warsaw Open, Poland	W25	Clay (i) (Note: This is an outdoor event, but rain on the day caused the singles semifinals and doubles final to be transferred to an indoor court.)	(Poland) Daria Kuczer	(Poland) Martyna Kubka (Poland) Stefania Rogozińska Dzik	3–6, 7–6^{(5)}, [10–1]
Loss	3–2	Nov 2018	Toronto Challenger, Canada	W60	Hard (i)	(Bulgaria) Elitsa Kostova	(Canada) Sharon Fichman (United States) Maria Sanchez	0–6, 4–6
Loss	3–3	Feb 2019	Trnava Indoor, Slovakia	W25	Hard (i)	(Czech Republic) Miriam Kolodziejová	(Romania) Laura-Ioana Andrei (Czech Republic) Anastasia Zarycká	4–6, 3–6
Win	4–3	Apr 2019	ITF Sunderland, UK	W25	Hard (i)	(Norway) Ulrikke Eikeri	(United States) Emina Bektas (United Kingdom) Tara Moore	6–4, 3–6, [11–9]
Win	5–3	Aug 2019	Warsaw Open, Poland (2)	W60	Clay	(Norway) Ulrikke Eikeri	(Poland) Weronika Falkowska (Poland) Martyna Kubka	6–4, 6–1
Loss	5–4	Dec 2020	ITF Selva Gardena, Italy	W25	Hard (i)	(Czech Republic) Linda Fruhvirtová	(Italy) Matilde Paoletti (Italy) Lisa Pigato	5–7, 1–6
Loss	5–5	Oct 2021	ITF Istanbul, Turkey	W25	Hard (i)	(Czech Republic) Miriam Kolodziejová	(Netherlands) Jasmijn Gimbrère (Netherlands) Bibiane Schoofs	2–6, 4–6
Loss	5–6	Nov 2021	ITF Haabneeme, Estonia	W25	Hard (i)	(Hungary) Adrienn Nagy	(United States) Jessica Failla (Japan) Chihiro Muramatsu	3–6, 4–6
Loss	5–7	Nov 2021	ITF Milovice, Czech Republic	W25	Hard (i)	(Czech Republic) Linda Nosková	(Japan) Sakura Hosogi (Japan) Misaki Matsuda	6–3, 2–6, [8–10]
Win	6–7	Dec 2021	ITF Jablonec nad Nisou, Czech Republic	W25	Carpet (i)	(Canada) Katherine Sebov	(Czech Republic) Lucie Havlíčková (Czech Republic) Linda Klimovičová	7–5, 6–4
Win	7–7	Apr 2022	Edge Istanbul, Turkey	W60	Clay	(Czech Republic) Jesika Malečková	(Russia) Anastasia Tikhonova (Turkey) Berfu Cengiz	2–6, 6–4, [10–7]
Win	8–7	May 2023	Prague Open, Czech Republic	W60	Clay	(Czech Republic) Jesika Malečková	(Czech Republic) Aneta Kučmová (Australia) Kaylah McPhee	6–0, 7–6^{(5)}
Loss	8–8	Jun 2023	Ilkley Trophy, United Kingdom	W100	Grass	(Czech Republic) Jesika Malečková	(Serbia) Natalija Stevanović (Japan) Nao Hibino	6–7^{(10)}, 6–7^{(5)}
Loss	8–9	Dec 2023	ITF Sharm El Sheikh, Egypt	W25	Hard	(Poland) Gina Feistel	Victoria Mikhaylova; Mariia Tkacheva	4–6, 6–3, [11–13]
Loss	8–10	Jan 2024	ITF Nonthaburi, Thailand	W50	Hard	(Japan) Yuki Naito	(Czech Republic) Anna Sisková; Ksenia Zaytseva	5–7, 6–7^{(3)}
Win	9–10	Feb 2024	AK Ladies Open, Germany	W75	Carpet (i)	(Czech Republic) Jesika Malečková	(Germany) Julia Lohoff (Switzerland) Conny Perrin	6–4, 7–5
Win	10–10	Jun 2024	Macha Lake Open, Czech Republic	W75	Clay	(Czech Republic) Anastasia Dețiuc	(China) Feng Shuo (Greece) Sapfo Sakellaridi	6–3, 2–6, [10–6]
Win	11–10	May 2025	Internazionali di Brescia, Italy	W75	Clay	(Austria) Sinja Kraus	(Czech Republic) Gabriela Knutson (Latvia) Darja Semeņistaja	6–0, 6–3

== National representation ==
=== Fed Cup/Billie Jean King Cup ===
==== Doubles (2–1) ====
Edition	Stage	Date	Location	Surface	Partner	Against	Opponents	W/L	Score
2019	ZG1 R/R	Feb 2019	Zielona Góra (POL)	Hard (i)	Alicja Rosolska	Denmark	Maria Jespersen; Hannah Viller Møller	W	6–0, 6–3
2020–21	ZG1 R/R	Feb 2020	Esch-sur-Alzette (LUX)	Hard (i)	Alicja Rosolska	Slovenia	Kaja Juvan; Pia Lovrič	L	5–7, 0–6
2020–21	ZG1 R/R	Feb 2020	Esch-sur-Alzette (LUX)	Hard (i)	Magdalena Fręch	Turkey	Ayla Aksu; İpek Öz	W	6–3, 6–4

== Junior finals ==
=== Grand Slam tournaments ===
==== Doubles: 1 (runner-up) ====
Result	Year	Tournament	Surface	Partner	Opponents	Score
Loss	2017	Australian Open	Hard	(Poland) Iga Świątek	(Canada) Bianca Andreescu (United States) Carson Branstine	1–6, 6–7^{(4)}

=== ITF Junior Circuit ===
Legend
Grade 1
Grade 2
Grade 3
Grade 4

==== Singles: 2 (2 titles) ====
Result	W–L	Date	Location	Tier	Surface	Opponent	Score
Win	1–0	Feb 2016	ITF Szczecin, Poland	G4	Hard (i)	(Poland) Weronika Falkowska	6–2, 6–3
Win	2–0	Feb 2016	ITF Hamburg, Germany	G4	Hard (i)	(Germany) Shaline-Doreen Pipa	6–0, 7–6^{(0)}

==== Doubles: 7 (1 title, 6 runner-ups) ====
Result	W–L	Date	Location	Tier	Surface	Partner	Opponents	Score
Loss	0–1	Feb 2016	ITF Szczecin, Poland	G4	Hard (i)	(Poland) Wiktoria Rutkowska	(Poland) Klara Siłka (Poland) Weronika Falkowska	6–1, 3–6, [2–10]
Loss	0–2	Feb 2016	ITF Šiauliai, Lithuania	G2	Hard (i)	(Ukraine) Anna Laguza	(Latvia) Deniza Marcinkēviča (Belarus) Katyarina Paulenka	3–6, 2–6
Loss	0–3	May 2016	ITF Mödling, Austria	G2	Clay	(Poland) Daria Kuczer	(Serbia) Olga Danilović (Czech Republic) Johana Marková	6–4, 6–7^{(2)}, [5–10]
Loss	0–4	May 2016	ITF Marcinelle, Belgium	G1	Clay	(Luxembourg) Eléonora Molinaro	(Chinese Taipei) Cho I-hsuan (Japan) Yuki Naito	2–6, 7–5, [5–10]
Loss	0–5	Aug 2016	ITF Budaörs, Hungary	G2	Clay	(Romania) Mihaela Lorena Marculescu	(Belarus) Eva Alexandrova (Ukraine) Maryna Chernyshova	3–6, 5–7
Loss	0–6	Sep 2016	ITF Prague, Czech Republic	G2	Clay	(Poland) Ania Hertel	(Czech Republic) Denisa Hunková (Czech Republic) Kristyna Lavicková	6–2, 3–6, [6–10]
Win	1–6	Jan 2017	ITF Traralgon, Australia	G1	Hard	(Poland) Iga Świątek	(Australia) Gabriella Da Silva-Fick (Australia) Kaitlin Staines	3–6, 6–4, [10–7]

=== Other junior finals ===
==== Fed Cup ====
Result	Date	Team competition	Surface	Partner/Team	Opponents	Score
Win	Oct 2016	Junior Fed Cup, Budapest	Clay	(Poland) Iga Świątek (Poland) Stefania Rogozińska-Dzik	(United States) Amanda Anisimova (United States) Claire Liu (United States) Caty McNally	2–1

== Career Grand Slam statistics ==
=== Best Grand Slam tournament results details ===
Australian Open
2025 Australian Open (Q – ranked 126)
Round	Opponent	Rank	Score
Q1	(Czech Republic) Dominika Šalková	151	7–6^{(7–3)}, 5–7, 7–6^{(12–10)}
Q2	(Belgium) Marie Benoît	200	6–1, 3–6, 6–1
Q3	(Czech Republic) Brenda Fruhvirtová	178	6–3, 6–4
1R	(Germany) Jule Niemeier	93	0–6, 1–6

Wimbledon
2022 Wimbledon (Q – ranked 185)
Round	Opponent	Rank	Score
Q1	(Spain) Aliona Bolsova	228	6–2, 4–6, 6–4
Q2	(Romania) Alexandra Cadanțu-Ignatik (24)	158	6–2, 5–7, 6–2
Q3	(United States) CoCo Vandeweghe (2)	122	6–3, 3–6, 4–6
1R	(Czech Republic) Kateřina Siniaková	63	6–0, 7–5
2R	(United States) Alison Riske-Amritraj (28)	35	6–3, 1–6, 0–6

French Open
2026 French Open (Q – ranked 114)
Round	Opponent	Rank	Score
Q1	(France) Alice Ramé	192	6–0, 6–3
Q2	(France) Carole Monnet	181	6–0, 6–1
Q3	(Netherlands) Suzan Lamens (17)	96	7–6^{(7–4)}, 7–5
1R	(China) Zheng Qinwen	53	6–4, 6–0
2R	(Belgium) Elise Mertens (23)	23	6–4, 6–0
3R	(Greece) Maria Sakkari	48	1–6, 6–3, 6–2
4R	(France) Diane Parry	94	6–3, 6–2
QF	Anna Kalinskaya (22)	22	7–6^{(7–3)}, 6–3
SF	Diana Shnaider (25)	25	7–6^{(7–4)}, 6–4
F	Mirra Andreeva (8)	8	3–6, 2–6

US Open
2026 US Open (ranked 22)
Round	Opponent	Rank	Score
1R	(United States) Taylor Townsend	96	2–6, 3–6

== Double-bagel matches ==
Result	W–L	Year	Tournament	Tier	Surface	Opponent	vsRank	Round
Win	1–0	2016	ITF Slovenska Lupca, Slovakia	10,000	Clay	(Czech Republic) Ludmila Kareisova	–	2QR
Win	2–0	2017	ITF Macon, France	15,000	Hard	(Italy) Claudia Franze	1115	1R
Win	3–0	2017	ITF Bastad, Sweden	25,000	Clay	(Lithuania) Patricija Zvirgzdauskaite	–	1QR
Win	4–0	2018	ITF Warsaw, Poland	25,000	Clay	(Germany) Romy Koelzer	441	1R
Win	5–0	2019	Open Andrezieux-Boutheon, France	W60	Hard	(France) Justine Clouvel	–	1R
Win	6–0	2023	ITF Sharm El-Sheikh, Egypt	W25	Hard	(Poland) Oliwia Szymczuch	–	1R
Win	7–0	2025	Quito Open, Ecuador	WTA 125	Clay	(Ecuador) Tania Varela-Alvarado	–	1R
Win	8–0	2026	Antalya Challenger, Turkiye	WTA 125	Clay	(Turkey) Ada Kumru	1074	1R

== Tennis records ==
Tournament	Year	Record accomplished	Player tied	Ref
French Open	2026	Major singles final as a qualifier	Emma Raducanu	
French Open	2026	Singles final at French Open as a qualifier, women and men combined	stands alone	
French Open	2026	Singles final in first French Open main-draw appearance	Evonne Goolagong; Chris Evert	
French Open	2026	Polish woman in a Grand Slam singles final (Open Era)	Iga Świątek; Agnieszka Radwańska	

== Wins against top 10 players ==
- Chwalińska's match record against players who were, at the time the match was played, ranked in the top 10.

Season	2026	Total
Wins	1	1

No.	Player	Rk	Event	Surface	Rd	Score	Rk	Years	Ref
1	(Poland) Iga Świątek	9	Wuhan Open, China	Hard	SF	7–5, 6–1	22	2026	

- Key: (Rk) first use, opponent rank; (Rd) round; (Rk) 2nd use, player rank; (Ref) reference; (F) final; (SF) semifinal; (QF) quarterfinal; (#R) rounds 4, 3, 2, 1; (RR) round-robin stage; (Q#) qualifying rounds or stages (3), 2, 1.
