= 2018 O1 Properties Ladies Cup – Singles =

Singles
- 2018 O1 Properties Ladies Cup

Final
- Champion: (Belarus) Vera Lapko
- Runner-up: (Russia) Anastasia Potapova
- Score: 6–1, 6–3

Events
Singles	Doubles
← 2017 ·	O1 Properties Ladies Cup	· 2019 →

Dejana Radanović was the defending champion, but lost in the second round to Ivana Jorović.

Vera Lapko won the title, defeating Anastasia Potapova in the final, 6–1, 6–3.

== Seeds ==
1. (Romania) Monica Niculescu (semifinals)
2. (Belarus) Vera Lapko (champion)
3. (Russia) Evgeniya Rodina (second round)
4. (Australia) Arina Rodionova (second round)
5. (Russia) Vitalia Diatchenko (semifinals)
6. (Greece) Valentini Grammatikopoulou (second round)
7. (Russia) Polina Monova (first round, retired)
8. (Serbia) Ivana Jorović (quarterfinals)

== Draw ==
=== Key ===
- Q = Qualifier
- WC = Wild card
- LL = Lucky loser
- Alt = Alternate
- SE = Special exempt
- PR = Protected ranking
- ITF = ITF entry
- JE = Junior exempt
- w/o = Walkover
- r = Retired
- d = Defaulted
- SR = Special ranking

=== Finals ===
Semifinals
1	(Romania) Monica Niculescu	5	6	4
(Russia) Anastasia Potapova	7	2	6
5	(Russia) Vitalia Diatchenko	5	3
2	(Belarus) Vera Lapko	7	6

Final
(Russia) Anastasia Potapova	1	3
2	(Belarus) Vera Lapko	6	6

=== Top half ===
First round
1	(Romania) M Niculescu	6	6
Q	(Russia) D Mishina	2	4
Q	(Russia) A Komardina	6	6
(Russia) V Savinykh	3	2
(Italy) S Rubini	7	2	3
(Serbia) D Radanović	5	6	6
(Russia) A Gasanova	1	1
8	(Serbia) I Jorović	6	6
3	(Russia) E Rodina	6	7
(Uzbekistan) N Abduraimova	2	5
WC	(Russia) M Gasparyan	4	6^{5}
(Russia) A Potapova	6	7^{7}
(Serbia) J Jakšić	5	4
(Israel) D Khazaniuk	7	6
Q	(Russia) E Yashina	3
7	(Russia) P Monova	0^{r}

Second round
1	(Romania) M Niculescu	6	6
Q	(Russia) A Komardina	2	1
(Serbia) D Radanović	5	6	2
8	(Serbia) I Jorović	7	3	6
3	(Russia) E Rodina	1	2
(Russia) A Potapova	6	6
(Israel) D Khazaniuk	6	6
Q	(Russia) E Yashina	2	3

Quarterfinals
1	(Romania) M Niculescu	6	6
8	(Serbia) I Jorović	3	1
(Russia) A Potapova	6	6
(Israel) D Khazaniuk	2	3

Semifinals
1	(Romania) M Niculescu	5	6	4
(Russia) A Potapova	7	2	6

=== Bottom half ===
First round
5	(Russia) V Diatchenko	4	6	6
WC	(Russia) S Lansere	6	2	3
(Ukraine) V Strakhova	6	6
(Russia) A Panova	2	4
WC	(Czech Republic) A Dețiuc	0	3
(Serbia) N Stojanović	6	6
WC	(Russia) V Flink	6^{4}	4
4	(Australia) Ar Rodionova	7^{7}	6
6	(Greece) V Grammatikopoulou	6^{6}	7^{7}	6
Q	(Russia) A Gabueva	7^{8}	6^{2}	4
(Israel) J Glushko	6	6
(Germany) V Heisen	3	2
(Russia) V Kamenskaya	1	1
(Russia) O Doroshina	6	6
(Russia) P Leykina	3	2
2	(Belarus) V Lapko	6	6

Second round
5	(Russia) V Diatchenko	6	7^{9}
(Ukraine) V Strakhova	2	6^{7}
(Serbia) N Stojanović	6	6
4	(Australia) Ar Rodionova	4	3
6	(Greece) V Grammatikopoulou	4	6^{4}
(Israel) J Glushko	6	7
(Russia) O Doroshina	5	1
2	(Belarus) V Lapko	7	6

Quarterfinals
5	(Russia) V Diatchenko	6	6
(Serbia) N Stojanović	3	0
(Israel) J Glushko	4	5
2	(Belarus) V Lapko	6	7

Semifinals
5	(Russia) V Diatchenko	5	3
2	(Belarus) V Lapko	7	6
