= 2016 Guangzhou International Women's Open – Singles =

Singles
- 2016 Guangzhou International Women's Open

Final
- Champion: (Ukraine) Lesia Tsurenko
- Runner-up: (Serbia) Jelena Janković
- Score: 6–4, 3–6, 6–4

Details
- Draw: 32
- Seeds: 8

Events
Singles	Doubles
- Guangzhou International Women's Open

Lesia Tsurenko won the singles title at the 2016 Guangzhou International Women's Open defeating defending champion Jelena Janković 6–4, 3–6, 6–4 in the final.

== Seeds ==
1. (Italy) Sara Errani (second round)
2. (Serbia) Jelena Janković (final)
3. (Croatia) Ana Konjuh (semifinals)
4. (United States) Christina McHale (withdrew)
5. (United States) Alison Riske (quarterfinals)
6. (Montenegro) Danka Kovinić (second round)
7. (Czech Republic) Kateřina Siniaková (first round)
8. (China) Zheng Saisai (first round)

== Draw ==
Key

- Q = Qualifier
- WC = Wild card
- LL = Lucky loser
- Alt = Alternate
- ITF = ITF entry
- PR = Protected ranking
- SR = Special ranking
- SE = Special exempt
- JE = Junior exempt
- JR = Junior Accelerator Programme entrant
- CO = College Accelerator Programme entrant
- NG = Next Gen Accelerator Program entrant
- w/o = Walkover
- r = Retired
- d = Defaulted

=== Finals ===
Semifinals
(Estonia) Anett Kontaveit	4	2
(Ukraine) Lesia Tsurenko	6	6
3	(Croatia) Ana Konjuh	5	6^{7}
2	(Serbia) Jelena Janković	7	7^{9}

Final
(Ukraine) Lesia Tsurenko	6	3	6
2	(Serbia) Jelena Janković	4	6	4

=== Top half ===
First round
1	(Italy) S Errani	4	7	7^{10}
(China) X Han	6	5	6^{8}
(Switzerland) V Golubic	3	6	7^{7}
(Czech Republic) D Allertová	6	3	6^{3}
(China) L Zhu	6	6
Q	(Ukraine) L Kichenok	4	3
(Estonia) A Kontaveit	6	6
7	(Czech Republic) K Siniaková	1	1
LL	(Italy) C Ferrando	4	3
(Uzbekistan) N Abduraimova	6	6
(Ukraine) L Tsurenko	6	6
Q	(Japan) J Namigata	4	1
(Russia) E Kulichkova	5	7^{7}	4
(Belarus) O Govortsova	7	6^{2}	6
Q	(China) F Xun	3	3
5	(United States) A Riske	6	6

Second round
1	(Italy) S Errani	7^{9}	3	4
(Switzerland) V Golubic	6^{7}	6	6
(China) L Zhu	1	6	0
(Estonia) A Kontaveit	6	3	6
(Uzbekistan) N Abduraimova	2	2
(Ukraine) L Tsurenko	6	6
(Belarus) O Govortsova	6	2	6^{1}
5	(United States) A Riske	2	6	7^{7}

Quarterfinals
(Switzerland) V Golubic	4	6	3
(Estonia) A Kontaveit	6	4	6
(Ukraine) L Tsurenko	3	6	6
5	(United States) A Riske	6	4	0

Semifinals
(Estonia) A Kontaveit	4	2
(Ukraine) L Tsurenko	6	6

=== Bottom half ===
First round
6	(Montenegro) D Kovinić	6	6
WC	(China) Y Wang	3	4
(United States) J Brady	4	6	4
Q	(Russia) A Pivovarova	6	4	0^{r}
(United States) V King	3	5
Q	(Georgia (country)) S Shapatava	6	7
(Germany) T Maria	2	2
3	(Croatia) A Konjuh	6	6
8	(China) S Zheng	6	2	3
WC	(China) S Peng	4	6	6
(Germany) S Lisicki	6	6
LL	(Hong Kong) K-y Ng	2	0
(Sweden) R Peterson	6	6
WC	(China) S Xu	3	1
Q	(China) X You	2	1
2	(Serbia) J Janković	6	6

Second round
6	(Montenegro) D Kovinić	3	5
(United States) J Brady	6	7
Q	(Georgia (country)) S Shapatava	1	6^{2}
3	(Croatia) A Konjuh	6	7^{7}
WC	(China) S Peng	4	1
(Germany) S Lisicki	6	6
(Sweden) R Peterson	1	0^{r}
2	(Serbia) J Janković	6	1

Quarterfinals
(United States) J Brady	4	5
3	(Croatia) A Konjuh	6	7
(Germany) S Lisicki	6^{4}	4
2	(Serbia) J Janković	7^{7}	6

Semifinals
3	(Croatia) A Konjuh	5	6^{7}
2	(Serbia) J Janković	7	7^{9}

== Qualifying ==
=== Seeds ===
1. (China) Liu Fangzhou (qualifying competition)
2. (United States) Asia Muhammad (first round)
3. (Russia) Anastasia Pivovarova (qualified)
4. (China) Zhang Yuxuan (first round, retired)
5. (China) Liu Chang (qualifying competition)
6. (Switzerland) Jil Teichmann (first round)
7. (Georgia (country)) Sofia Shapatava (qualified)
8. (Ukraine) Lyudmyla Kichenok (qualified)
9. (Japan) Junri Namigata (qualified)
10. (Italy) Cristiana Ferrando (qualifying competition, lucky loser)
11. (Chinese Taipei) Hsu Ching-wen (first round)
12. (Ukraine) Nadiia Kichenok (first round)

=== Qualifiers ===
1. (Georgia (country)) Sofia Shapatava
2. (Ukraine) Lyudmyla Kichenok
3. (Russia) Anastasia Pivovarova
4. (Japan) Junri Namigata
5. (China) Xun Fangying
6. (China) You Xiaodi

=== Lucky losers ===
1. (Italy) Cristiana Ferrando
2. (Hong Kong) Ng Kwan-yau

=== Draw ===
==== First qualifier ====
First round				Qualifying competition
				1	(China) Liu Fangzhou	6	2	3
WC	(Japan) Naoko Eto	0	1	7	(Georgia (country)) Sofia Shapatava	4	6	6
7	(Georgia (country)) Sofia Shapatava	6	6

==== Second qualifier ====
First round
2	(United States) Asia Muhammad	1	3
(Belarus) Vera Lapko	6	6
WC	(China) Li Yihong	2	1
8	(Ukraine) Lyudmyla Kichenok	6	6

Qualifying competition
(Belarus) Vera Lapko	4	6	2
8	(Ukraine) Lyudmyla Kichenok	6	3	6

==== Third qualifier ====
First round
3	(Russia) Anastasia Pivovarova	6	6
(China) Zhang Ying	2	1
WC	(China) Liu Yanni	1	2
10	(Italy) Cristiana Ferrando	6	6

Qualifying competition
3	(Russia) Anastasia Pivovarova	4	6	7^{7}
10	(Italy) Cristiana Ferrando	6	2	6^{5}

==== Fourth qualifier ====
First round
4	(China) Zhang Yuxuan	2	0^{r}
(Japan) Yuuki Tanaka	6	1
WC	(Hong Kong) Ng Kwan-yau	1	3
9	(Japan) Junri Namigata	6	6

Qualifying competition
(Japan) Yuuki Tanaka	3	2
9	(Japan) Junri Namigata	6	6

==== Fifth qualifier ====
First round
5	(China) Liu Chang	6	6
WC	(China) Guo Meiqi	3	1
(China) Xun Fangying	6	6
11	(Chinese Taipei) Hsu Ching-wen	4	0

Qualifying competition
5	(China) Liu Chang	2	1
(China) Xun Fangying	6	6

==== Sixth qualifier ====
First round
6	(Switzerland) Jil Teichmann	2	6^{2}
WC	(Belarus) Lidziya Marozava	6	7^{7}
(China) You Xiaodi	6	2	6
12	(Ukraine) Nadiia Kichenok	4	6	3

Qualifying competition
WC	(Belarus) Lidziya Marozava	2	3
(China) You Xiaodi	6	6
