= 2016 Guangzhou International Women's Open =

Women's tennis tournament

- Date: September 19–24
- Edition: 13th
- Category: WTA International
- Draw: 32S / 16D
- Prize money: $250,000
- Surface: Hard
- Location: Guangzhou, China
- Venue: Guangzhou International Tennis Center

Champions

Singles
- (Ukraine) Lesia Tsurenko

Doubles
- (United States) Asia Muhammad / (China) Peng Shuai
← 2015 ·	Guangzhou International Women's Open	· 2017 →

The 2016 Guangzhou International Women's Open was a women's tennis tournament played on outdoor hard courts.

It was the 13th edition of the Guangzhou International Women's Open, and part of the WTA International tournaments of the 2016 WTA Tour. It took place in Guangzhou, China, from September 19 through September 24, 2016.

== Points and prize money ==
Event	W	F	SF	QF	Round of 16	Round of 32	Q	Q2	Q1
Singles	280	180	110	60	30	1	18	12	1
Doubles	280	180	110	60	1	—	—	—	—

=== Prize money ===
Event	W	F	SF	QF	Round of 16	Round of 32^{1}	Q2	Q1
Singles	$43,000	$21,400	$11,500	$6,175	$3,400	$2,100	$1,020	$600
Doubles *	$12,300	$6,400	$3,435	$1,820	$960	—	—	—

_{^{1} Qualifiers prize money is also the Round of 32 prize money}
_{* per team}

== Singles main-draw entrants ==
=== Seeds ===
Country	Player	Rank^{1}	Seed
ITA	Sara Errani	36	1
SRB	Jelena Janković	37	2
CRO	Ana Konjuh	52	3
~~USA~~	~~Christina McHale~~	~~53~~	~~4~~
USA	Alison Riske	61	5
MNE	Danka Kovinić	63	6
CZE	Kateřina Siniaková	65	7
CHN	Zheng Saisai	70	8

- ^{1} Rankings are as of September 12, 2016.

=== Other entrants ===
The following players received wildcards into the singles main draw:

- (China) Peng Shuai
- (China) Wang Yafan
- (China) Xu Shilin

The following players received entry from the qualifying draw:

- (Ukraine) Lyudmyla Kichenok
- (Japan) Junri Namigata
- (Russia) Anastasia Pivovarova
- (Georgia (country)) Sofia Shapatava
- (China) Xun Fangying
- (China) You Xiaodi

The following players received entry as a lucky loser:

- (Italy) Cristiana Ferrando
- (Hong Kong) Ng Kwan-yau

=== Withdrawals ===
Before the tournament

- (France) Alizé Cornet → replaced by (United States) Jennifer Brady
- (United States) Irina Falconi → replaced by (Belarus) Olga Govortsova
- (France) Caroline Garcia → replaced by (Germany) Tatjana Maria
- (Slovenia) Polona Hercog → replaced by (Sweden) Rebecca Peterson
- (Chinese Taipei) Hsieh Su-wei → replaced by (Hong Kong) Ng Kwan-yau
- (United States) Christina McHale → replaced by (Italy) Cristiana Ferrando
- (Italy) Roberta Vinci → replaced by (Russia) Elizaveta Kulichkova
- (China) Zhang Kailin → replaced by (China) Han Xinyun

== Doubles main-draw entrants ==
=== Seeds ===
Country	Player	Country	Player	Rank^{1}	Seed
ARG	María Irigoyen	GER	Tatjana Maria	111	1
UKR	Lyudmyla Kichenok	UKR	Nadiia Kichenok	132	2
SUI	Martina Hingis	SRB	Jelena Janković	151	3
USA	Asia Muhammad	CHN	Peng Shuai	177	4

- ^{1} Rankings are as of September 12, 2016.

The following pairs received wildcards into the doubles main draw:

- (Belarus) Olga Govortsova / (Belarus) Vera Lapko
- (Hong Kong) Ng Kwan-yau / (China) Zheng Saisai

== Champions ==
=== Singles ===
- (Ukraine) Lesia Tsurenko def. (Serbia) Jelena Janković, 6–4, 3–6, 6–4

=== Doubles ===
- (United States) Asia Muhammad / (China) Peng Shuai def. (Belarus) Olga Govortsova / (Belarus) Vera Lapko, 6–2, 7–6^{(7–3)}
