= 2018 Guangzhou International Women's Open =

- Date: September 17–22
- Edition: 15th
- Category: WTA International
- Draw: 32S / 16D
- Prize money: $250,000
- Surface: Hard
- Location: Guangzhou, China
- Venue: Guangdong Olympic Tennis Centre

Champions

Singles
- (China) Wang Qiang

Doubles
- (Australia) Monique Adamczak / (Australia) Jessica Moore
← 2017 ·	Guangzhou International Women's Open	· 2019 →

The 2018 Guangzhou International Women's Open is a women's tennis tournament played on outdoor hard courts. It was the 15th edition of the Guangzhou International Women's Open, and part of the WTA International tournaments of the 2018 WTA Tour. It took place in Guangzhou, China, from September 17 through September 22, 2018.

== Points and prize money ==
Event	W	F	SF	QF	Round of 16	Round of 32	Q	Q2	Q1
Singles	280	180	110	60	30	1	18	12	1
Doubles	280	180	110	60	1	—	—	—	—

=== Prize money ===
Event	W	F	SF	QF	Round of 16	Round of 32^{1}	Q2	Q1
Singles	$43,000	$21,400	$11,500	$6,175	$3,400	$2,100	$1,020	$600
Doubles *	$12,300	$6,400	$3,435	$1,820	$960	—	—	—

_{^{1} Qualifiers prize money is also the Round of 32 prize money}
_{* per team}

== Singles main-draw entrants ==
=== Seeds ===
Country	Player	Rank^{1}	Seed
FRA	Alizé Cornet	33	1
~~CHN~~	~~Zhang Shuai~~	~~40~~	~~2~~
CHN	Wang Qiang	43	3
SRB	Aleksandra Krunić	51	4
KAZ	Yulia Putintseva	55	5
SVK	Viktória Kužmová	58	6
BLR	Vera Lapko	64	7
CHN	Zheng Saisai	76	8

- ^{1} Rankings are as of September 10, 2018

=== Other entrants ===
The following players received wildcards into the singles main draw:

- (Russia) Svetlana Kuznetsova
- (China) Wang Xinyu
- (China) Wang Xiyu
- (Russia) Vera Zvonareva

The following players received entry using a protected ranking:

- (United States) Vania King
- (Germany) Sabine Lisicki

The following players received entry from the qualifying draw:

- (Australia) Lizette Cabrera
- (China) Guo Hanyu
- (Serbia) Ivana Jorović
- (Israel) Deniz Khazaniuk
- (China) Lu Jiajing
- (India) Karman Thandi

The following players received entry as a lucky loser:

- (China) Zhu Lin

=== Withdrawals ===
Before the tournament

- (China) Peng Shuai → replaced by (United States) Vania King
- (Sweden) Rebecca Peterson → replaced by (Poland) Magdalena Fręch
- (Belarus) Aryna Sabalenka → replaced by (France) Fiona Ferro
- (Belgium) Yanina Wickmayer → replaced by (Switzerland) Viktorija Golubic
- (China) Zhang Shuai → replaced by (China) Zhu Lin

During the tournament

- (United States) Jennifer Brady

== Doubles main-draw entrants ==
=== Seeds ===
Country	Player	Country	Player	Rank^{1}	Seed
USA	Kaitlyn Christian	USA	Sabrina Santamaria	108	1
KAZ	Galina Voskoboeva	RUS	Vera Zvonareva	148	2
AUS	Monique Adamczak	AUS	Jessica Moore	149	3
CHN	Jiang Xinyu	CHN	Tang Qianhui	235	4

- ^{1} Rankings are as of September 10, 2018

=== Other entrants ===
The following pair received a wildcard into the doubles main draw:

- (Hong Kong) Ng Kwan-yau / (China) Zheng Saisai

== Finals ==
=== Singles ===
- (China) Wang Qiang def. (Kazakhstan) Yulia Putintseva, 6–1, 6–2

=== Doubles ===
- (Australia) Monique Adamczak / (Australia) Jessica Moore def. (Montenegro) Danka Kovinić / (Belarus) Vera Lapko, 4–6, 7–5, [10–4]
