= 2018 O1 Properties Ladies Cup – Doubles =

Doubles
- 2018 O1 Properties Ladies Cup

Final
- Champions: (Russia) Olga Doroshina (Russia) Anastasiya Komardina
- Runners-up: (Russia) Veronika Pepelyaeva (Russia) Anastasia Tikhonova
- Score: 6–1, 6–2

Events
| Singles | Doubles |
| ← 2017 · | O1 Properties Ladies Cup | · 2019 → |

Olesya Pervushina and Anastasia Potapova were the defending champions, but Pervushina chose not to participate. Potapova partnered Galina Voskoboeva, but lost in the first round to Natela Dzalamidze and Nina Stojanović.

Olga Doroshina and Anastasiya Komardina won the title, defeating Veronika Pepelyaeva and Anastasia Tikhonova in the final, 6–1, 6–2.

== Seeds ==
1. (Russia) Natela Dzalamidze / (Serbia) Nina Stojanović (semifinals)
2. (Australia) Arina Rodionova / (Russia) Valeria Savinykh (first round)
3. (Russia) Olga Doroshina / (Russia) Anastasiya Komardina (champions)
4. (Uzbekistan) Nigina Abduraimova / (Serbia) Jovana Jakšić (first round)

== Draw ==
=== Key ===
- Q = Qualifier
- WC = Wild card
- LL = Lucky loser
- Alt = Alternate
- SE = Special exempt
- PR = Protected ranking
- ITF = ITF entry
- JE = Junior exempt
- w/o = Walkover
- r = Retired
- d = Defaulted
- SR = Special ranking

=== Draw ===
First round
1 | (Russia) N Dzalamidze (Serbia) N Stojanović | 6 | 6
(Russia) A Potapova (Kazakhstan) G Voskoboeva | 4 | 2
WC | (Russia) M Gasparyan (Russia) S Lansere | 6 | 6
(Germany) V Heisen (Ukraine) V Strakhova | 3 | 2
3 | (Russia) O Doroshina (Russia) A Komardina | 6 | 6
(Russia) K Bekker (Kyrgyzstan) K Palkina | 1 | 1
(Russia) A Gabueva (Russia) E Kazionova | 7 | 6
WC | (Russia) D Kruzhkova (Russia) V Pogrebnyak | 5 | 2
(Czech Republic) A Dețiuc (Russia) E Yashina | 5 | 4
(Israel) J Glushko (Russia) M Lazareva | 7 | 6
(Greece) V Grammatikopoulou (Netherlands) R van der Hoek | 7 | 2 | [10]
4 | (Uzbekistan) N Abduraimova (Serbia) J Jakšić | 5 | 6 | [2]
WC | (Russia) V Pepelyaeva (Russia) A Tikhonova | 7^{7} | 6
(Russia) A Silich (Russia) V Zeleva | 6^{3} | 4
(Russia) A Gasanova (Russia) E Vishnevskaya | 1 | 7 | [10]
2 | (Australia) Ar Rodionova (Russia) V Savinykh | 6 | 5 | [4]

Quarterfinals
1 | (Russia) N Dzalamidze (Serbia) N Stojanović | 4 | 6 | [10]
WC | (Russia) M Gasparyan (Russia) S Lansere | 6 | 4 | [3]
3 | (Russia) O Doroshina (Russia) A Komardina | 7^{7} | 6
(Russia) A Gabueva (Russia) E Kazionova | 6^{3} | 2
(Israel) J Glushko (Russia) M Lazareva | 4 | 6 | [12]
(Greece) V Grammatikopoulou (Netherlands) R van der Hoek | 6 | 3 | [10]
WC | (Russia) V Pepelyaeva (Russia) A Tikhonova | 6 | 7^{7}
(Russia) A Gasanova (Russia) E Vishnevskaya | 3 | 6^{3}

Semifinals
1 | (Russia) N Dzalamidze (Serbia) N Stojanović | 3 | 4
3 | (Russia) O Doroshina (Russia) A Komardina | 6 | 6
(Israel) J Glushko (Russia) M Lazareva | 3 | 3
WC | (Russia) V Pepelyaeva (Russia) A Tikhonova | 6 | 6

Final
3 | (Russia) O Doroshina (Russia) A Komardina | 6 | 6
WC | (Russia) V Pepelyaeva (Russia) A Tikhonova | 1 | 2
