= 2019 WSG Open =

- Date: 5–11 August 2019
- Edition: 3rd
- Category: ITF Women's World Tennis Tour
- Prize money: $60,000
- Surface: Clay
- Location: Warsaw, Poland

Champions

Singles
- (Poland) Maja Chwalińska

Doubles
- (Poland) Maja Chwalińska / (Norway) Ulrikke Eikeri
← 2018 ·	WSG Open

The 2019 WSG Open was a professional tennis tournament played on outdoor clay courts. It was the third edition of the tournament which was part of the 2019 ITF Women's World Tennis Tour. It took place in Warsaw, Poland between 5 and 11 August 2019.

== Singles main-draw entrants ==
=== Seeds ===
Country	Player	Rank^{1}	Seed
SVK	Rebecca Šramková	173	1
GEO	Ekaterine Gorgodze	194	2
BUL	Isabella Shinikova	221	3
NOR	Ulrikke Eikeri	229	4
BUL	Elitsa Kostova	238	5
RUS	Valentina Ivakhnenko	250	6
CHN	Yuan Yue	268	7
FRA	Tessah Andrianjafitrimo	276	8

- ^{1} Rankings are as of 29 July 2019.

=== Other entrants ===
The following players received wildcards into the singles main draw:

- (Poland) Paula Kania
- (Czech Republic) Johana Marková
- (Poland) Stefania Rogozińska Dzik
- (Poland) Zuzanna Szczepańska

The following players received entry from the qualifying draw:

- (Ukraine) Maryna Chernyshova
- (Romania) Nicoleta Dascălu
- (Czech Republic) Anastasia Dețiuc
- (Romania) Andreea Ghițescu
- (Slovakia) Vivien Juhászová
- (Italy) Camilla Rosatello
- (Ukraine) Anastasiya Shoshyna
- (Belarus) Iryna Shymanovich

== Champions ==
=== Singles ===
- (Poland) Maja Chwalińska def. (Russia) Anastasiya Komardina, 6–3, 6–0

=== Doubles ===
- (Poland) Maja Chwalińska / (Norway) Ulrikke Eikeri def. (Poland) Weronika Falkowska / (Poland) Martyna Kubka, 6–4, 6–1
