= 2018 Wuhan Open – Singles =

Singles
- 2018 Wuhan Open

Final
- Champion: (Belarus) Aryna Sabalenka
- Runner-up: (Estonia) Anett Kontaveit
- Score: 6–3, 6–3

Details
- Draw: 56 (8 Q / 4 WC )
- Seeds: 16

Events
Singles	Doubles
- Wuhan Open

Aryna Sabalenka defeated Anett Kontaveit in the final, 6–3, 6–3 to win the singles tennis title at the 2018 Wuhan Open.

Caroline Garcia was the defending champion, but lost in the second round to Kateřina Siniaková.

== Seeds ==
The top eight seeds received a bye into the second round.

1. (Romania) Simona Halep (second round)
2. (Denmark) Caroline Wozniacki (third round)
3. (Germany) Angelique Kerber (third round)
4. (France) Caroline Garcia (second round)
5. (Czech Republic) Petra Kvitová (third round)
6. (Ukraine) Elina Svitolina (second round)
7. (Japan) Naomi Osaka (withdrew)
8. (Czech Republic) Karolína Plíšková (second round)

9. (United States) Sloane Stephens (first round)
10. (Latvia) Jeļena Ostapenko (first round)
11. (Germany) Julia Görges (second round)
12. (Netherlands) Kiki Bertens (second round)
13. (Russia) Daria Kasatkina (third round)
14. (Spain) Garbiñe Muguruza (third round)
15. (Belgium) Elise Mertens (first round)
16. (Australia) Ashleigh Barty (semifinals)

Click on the seed number of a player to go to their draw section.

== Draw ==
Key

- Q = Qualifier
- WC = Wild card
- LL = Lucky loser
- Alt = Alternate
- ITF = ITF entry
- PR = Protected ranking
- SR = Special ranking
- SE = Special exempt
- JE = Junior exempt
- JR = Junior Accelerator Programme entrant
- CO = College Accelerator Programme entrant
- NG = Next Gen Accelerator Program entrant
- w/o = Walkover
- r = Retired
- d = Defaulted

=== Finals ===
Quarterfinals
(Slovakia) Dominika Cibulková	5	3
(Belarus) Aryna Sabalenka	7	6
16	(Australia) Ashleigh Barty	6	5	6
(Russia) Anastasia Pavlyuchenkova	2	7	4
(Estonia) Anett Kontaveit	6	6
Q	(Czech Republic) Kateřina Siniaková	4	4
WC	(China) Wang Qiang	6	6
Q	(Puerto Rico) Monica Puig	3	1

Semifinals
(Belarus) Aryna Sabalenka	7^{7}	6
16	(Australia) Ashleigh Barty	6^{2}	4
(Estonia) Anett Kontaveit	6	2
WC	(China) Wang Qiang	2	1^{r}

Final
(Belarus) Aryna Sabalenka	6	6
(Estonia) Anett Kontaveit	3	3

=== Top half ===
==== Section 1 ====
First round
LL	(Romania) M Niculescu	4	3
(Slovakia) D Cibulková	6	6
WC	(United States) B Pera	4	3
Q	(China) Xiy Wang	6	6
(Ukraine) L Tsurenko	4	5
13	(Russia) D Kasatkina	6	7
11	(Germany) J Görges	6	3	7^{7}
LL	(Czech Republic) M Vondroušová	3	6	6^{4}
Q	(United States) S Kenin	6	6
(Chinese Taipei) S-w Hsieh	1	1
(Belarus) A Sabalenka	7^{7}	2	6
(Spain) C Suárez Navarro	6^{2}	6	2

Second round
1	(Romania) S Halep	0	5
(Slovakia) D Cibulková	6	7
Q	(China) Xiy Wang	1	6	6^{8}
13	(Russia) D Kasatkina	6	3	7^{10}
11	(Germany) J Görges	3	6	4
Q	(United States) S Kenin	6	2	6
(Belarus) A Sabalenka	6	2	6
6	(Ukraine) E Svitolina	4	6	1

Third round
(Slovakia) D Cibulková	6	7^{7}
13	(Russia) D Kasatkina	3	6^{3}
Q	(United States) S Kenin	3	3
(Belarus) A Sabalenka	6	6

Quarterfinals
(Slovakia) D Cibulková	5	3
(Belarus) A Sabalenka	7	6

==== Section 2 ====
First round
Q	(China) Y Wang	3	3
(United States) M Keys	6	6
WC	(China) S Zheng	2	6	6
(United States) D Collins	6	4	2
(United Kingdom) J Konta	5	4
16	(Australia) A Barty	7	6
12	(Netherlands) K Bertens	6	4	6
(Switzerland) B Bencic	3	6	2
(Russia) A Pavlyuchenkova	6	6
(Latvia) A Sevastova	2	3
(Serbia) A Krunić	6	4	6
(Italy) C Giorgi	4	6	4

Second round
3	(Germany) A Kerber	6	4
(United States) M Keys	0	1^{r}
WC	(China) S Zheng	6	1	2
16	(Australia) A Barty	4	6	6
12	(Netherlands) K Bertens	4	2
(Russia) A Pavlyuchenkova	6	6
(Serbia) A Krunić	3	4
5	(Czech Republic) P Kvitová	6	6

Third round
3	(Germany) A Kerber	5	1
16	(Australia) A Barty	7	6
(Russia) A Pavlyuchenkova	3	6	6
5	(Czech Republic) P Kvitová	6	3	3

Quarterfinals
16	(Australia) A Barty	6	5	6
(Russia) A Pavlyuchenkova	2	7	4

=== Bottom half ===
==== Section 3 ====
First round
WC	(Australia) S Stosur	2	2
(China) S Zhang	6	6
(United States) C Vandeweghe	4	6	1^{r}
(Croatia) D Vekić	6	3	2
(Estonia) A Kontaveit	4	7	6
9	(United States) S Stephens	6	5	4
14	(Spain) G Muguruza	6	6
(Belgium) A Van Uytvanck	4	0
Q	(Spain) S Sorribes Tormo	3	7	4
Q	(Switzerland) V Golubic	6	5	6
(France) K Mladenovic	6^{4}	2
Q	(Czech Republic) K Siniaková	7^{7}	6

Second round
LL	(Slovenia) P Hercog	2	5
(China) S Zhang	6	7
(Croatia) D Vekić	2	4
(Estonia) A Kontaveit	6	6
14	(Spain) G Muguruza	6	6
Q	(Switzerland) V Golubic	0	1
Q	(Czech Republic) K Siniaková	3	7^{7}	7^{7}
4	(France) C Garcia	6	6^{5}	6^{4}

Third round
(China) S Zhang	4	6	1
(Estonia) A Kontaveit	6	4	6
14	(Spain) G Muguruza	6^{3}	6^{1}
Q	(Czech Republic) K Siniaková	7^{7}	7^{7}

Quarterfinals
(Estonia) A Kontaveit	6	6
Q	(Czech Republic) K Siniaková	4	4

==== Section 4 ====
First round
WC	(China) Q Wang	7	6
(Greece) M Sakkari	5	2
(France) A Cornet	3	2
(Czech Republic) B Strýcová	6	6
(Australia) D Gavrilova	6	6
10	(Latvia) J Ostapenko	2	4
15	(Belgium) E Mertens	6^{5}	6^{3}
(Belarus) A Sasnovich	7^{7}	7^{7}
Q	(Puerto Rico) M Puig	7	5	6
(Belgium) K Flipkens	5	7	3
(Hungary) T Babos	7^{7}	4	1^{r}
Q	(Sweden) R Peterson	6^{0}	6	4

Second round
8	(Czech Republic) Ka Plíšková	1	6	3
WC	(China) Q Wang	6	3	6
(Czech Republic) B Strýcová	2	6^{3}
(Australia) D Gavrilova	6	7^{7}
(Belarus) A Sasnovich	2	2
Q	(Puerto Rico) M Puig	6	6
Q	(Sweden) R Peterson	4	1
2	(Denmark) C Wozniacki	6	6

Third round
WC	(China) Q Wang	7	6
(Australia) D Gavrilova	5	2
Q	(Puerto Rico) M Puig	7^{12}	7
2	(Denmark) C Wozniacki	6^{10}	5

Quarterfinals
WC	(China) Q Wang	6	6
Q	(Puerto Rico) M Puig	3	1

== Qualifying ==
=== Seeds ===
1. (Russia) Ekaterina Makarova (first round)
2. (Czech Republic) Kateřina Siniaková (qualified)
3. (Puerto Rico) Monica Puig (qualified)
4. (Romania) Sorana Cîrstea (first round)
5. (Sweden) Rebecca Peterson (qualified)
6. (Slovakia) Viktória Kužmová (first round)
7. (Kazakhstan) Yulia Putintseva (withdrew, still playing in Guangzhou)
8. (United States) Sofia Kenin (qualified)
9. (Poland) Magda Linette (first round)
10. (Czech Republic) Markéta Vondroušová (qualifying competition, lucky loser)
11. (Spain) Lara Arruabarrena (first round)
12. (China) Wang Yafan (qualified)
13. (Slovenia) Polona Hercog (qualifying competition, lucky loser)
14. (Romania) Ana Bogdan (first round)
15. (Romania) Monica Niculescu (qualifying competition, lucky loser)
16. (Germany) Andrea Petkovic (withdrew, still playing in Guangzhou)

=== Qualifiers ===
1. (China) Wang Yafan
2. (Czech Republic) Kateřina Siniaková
3. (Puerto Rico) Monica Puig
4. (Switzerland) Viktorija Golubic
5. (Sweden) Rebecca Peterson
6. (China) Wang Xiyu
7. (Spain) Sara Sorribes Tormo
8. (United States) Sofia Kenin

=== Lucky losers ===
1. (Czech Republic) Markéta Vondroušová
2. (Slovenia) Polona Hercog
3. (Romania) Monica Niculescu

=== Draw ===
==== First qualifier ====
First round
1	(Russia) Ekaterina Makarova	1	6	3
(Australia) Lizette Cabrera	6	4	6
(United States) Amanda Anisimova	4	6	2
12	(China) Wang Yafan	6	3	6

Qualifying competition
(Australia) Lizette Cabrera	6^{2}	6^{3}
12	(China) Wang Yafan	7^{7}	7^{7}

==== Second qualifier ====
First round
2	(Czech Republic) Kateřina Siniaková	6	6
(Switzerland) Jil Teichmann	3	3
(United States) Caroline Dolehide	6	1	1
10	(Czech Republic) Markéta Vondroušová	3	6	6

Qualifying competition
2	(Czech Republic) Kateřina Siniaková	6	6
10	(Czech Republic) Markéta Vondroušová	1	1

==== Third qualifier ====
First round
3	(Puerto Rico) Monica Puig	6	7^{7}
(United States) Claire Liu	3	6^{5}
(United States) Christina McHale	6^{2}	1
13	(Slovenia) Polona Hercog	7^{7}	6

Qualifying competition
3	(Puerto Rico) Monica Puig	6	6
13	(Slovenia) Polona Hercog	4	4

==== Fourth qualifier ====
First round
4	(Romania) Sorana Cîrstea	4	5
(United States) Nicole Gibbs	6	7
(Switzerland) Viktorija Golubic	6	6^{4}	6
WC	(Germany) Sabine Lisicki	3	7^{7}	1

Qualifying competition
(United States) Nicole Gibbs	4	2
(Switzerland) Viktorija Golubic	6	6

==== Fifth qualifier ====
First round
5	(Sweden) Rebecca Peterson	6	6
(China) Han Xinyun	3	1
(China) Duan Yingying	2	6	6
14	(Romania) Ana Bogdan	6	3	2

Qualifying competition
5	(Sweden) Rebecca Peterson	4	6	6
(China) Duan Yingying	6	3	3

==== Sixth qualifier ====
First round
6	(Slovakia) Viktória Kužmová	6^{5}	2
WC	(China) Wang Xiyu	7^{7}	6
PR	(United States) Vania King	6	6
11	(Spain) Lara Arruabarrena	1	0

Qualifying competition
WC	(China) Wang Xiyu	6	0
PR	(United States) Vania King	1	0^{r}

==== Seventh qualifier ====
First round
Alt	(Germany) Anna Zaja	6	6
WC	(China) Xun Fangying	3	2
(Spain) Sara Sorribes Tormo	4	6	6
9	(Poland) Magda Linette	6	2	3

Qualifying competition
Alt	(Germany) Anna Zaja	3	4
(Spain) Sara Sorribes Tormo	6	6

==== Eighth qualifier ====
First round
8	(United States) Sofia Kenin	6	6
WC	(China) Yang Zhaoxuan	1	2
(China) Liu Fangzhou	2	3
15	(Romania) Monica Niculescu	6	6

Qualifying competition
8	(United States) Sofia Kenin	7^{7}	4	6
15	(Romania) Monica Niculescu	6^{5}	6	2
