= 2019 Guangzhou International Women's Open =

- Date: September 16–21
- Edition: 16th
- Category: WTA International
- Draw: 32S / 16D
- Prize money: $500,000
- Surface: Hard
- Location: Guangzhou, China
- Venue: Guangzhou Tianhe Sports Center

Champions

Singles
- (United States) Sofia Kenin

Doubles
- (China) Peng Shuai / (Germany) Laura Siegemund
← 2018 ·	Guangzhou International Women's Open	· 2023 →

The 2019 Guangzhou International Women's Open was a professional women's tennis tournament played on outdoor hard courts. It was the 16th edition of the Guangzhou International Women's Open, and part of the WTA International tournaments of the 2019 WTA Tour. It took place at the Guangzhou Tianhe Sports Center in Guangzhou, China, from September 16 through September 21, 2019. Third-seeded Sofia Kenin won the singles title.

== Finals ==
=== Singles ===
- (United States) Sofia Kenin defeated (Australia) Samantha Stosur, 6–7^{(4–7)}, 6–4, 6–2

=== Doubles ===
- (China) Peng Shuai / (Germany) Laura Siegemund defeated (Chile) Alexa Guarachi / (Mexico) Giuliana Olmos, 6–2, 6–1

== Points and prize money ==
Event	W	F	SF	QF	Round of 16	Round of 32	Q	Q2	Q1
Singles	280	180	110	60	30	1	18	12	1
Doubles	280	180	110	60	1	—	—	—	—

=== Prize money ===
Event	W	F	SF	QF	Round of 16	Round of 32^{1}	Q2	Q1
Singles	$112,300	$57,665	$30,959	$8,380	$4,629	$2,707	$1,350	$722
Doubles *	$17,262	$9,023	$4,865	$2,589	$1,350	—	—	—

_{^{1} Qualifiers prize money is also the Round of 32 prize money}
_{* per team}

== Singles main-draw entrants ==
=== Seeds ===
Country	Player	Rank^{1}	Seed
UKR	Elina Svitolina	3	1
CHN	Wang Qiang	12	2
USA	Sofia Kenin	20	3
CHN	Zhang Shuai	32	4
CZE	Kateřina Siniaková	37	5
CHN	Zheng Saisai	38	6
BLR	Aliaksandra Sasnovich	48	7
TUN	Ons Jabeur	51	8

- ^{1} Rankings are as of September 9, 2019

=== Other entrants ===
The following players received wildcards into the singles main draw:

- (China) Duan Yingying
- ~~(Russia) Svetlana Kuznetsova~~
- (China) Peng Shuai
- (Australia) Samantha Stosur

The following player received entry into the singles main draw as a special exempt:

- (Serbia) Nina Stojanović

The following players received entry from the qualifying draw:

- (Poland) Magdalena Fręch
- (Czech Republic) Tereza Martincová
- (Italy) Jasmine Paolini
- (Netherlands) Lesley Pattinama Kerkhove
- (China) Xun Fangying
- (Ukraine) Katarina Zavatska

The following players received entry into the main draw as lucky losers:

- (Slovenia) Dalila Jakupović
- (China) Wang Xiyu

=== Withdrawals ===
Before the tournament

- (United States) Jennifer Brady → replaced by (Serbia) Aleksandra Krunić
- (Romania) Sorana Cîrstea → replaced by (Spain) Sara Sorribes Tormo
- (Russia) Svetlana Kuznetsova → replaced by (China) Wang Xiyu
- (Sweden) Rebecca Peterson → replaced by (Slovenia) Dalila Jakupović

=== Retirements ===
- (Kazakhstan) Elena Rybakina (left thigh injury)
- (Spain) Sara Sorribes Tormo (right foot injury)
- (Ukraine) Elina Svitolina (right knee pain)

== Doubles main-draw entrants ==
=== Seeds ===
Country	Player	Country	Player	Rank^{1}	Seed
AUS	Samantha Stosur	CHN	Zhang Shuai	28	1
CHN	Duan Yingying	CHN	Yang Zhaoxuan	72	2
SRB	Aleksandra Krunić	BLR	Lidziya Marozava	107	3
AUS	Ellen Perez	USA	Sabrina Santamaria	138	4

- ^{1} Rankings are as of September 9, 2019

=== Other entrants ===
The following pairs received wildcards into the doubles main draw:

- (China) Lu Jiajing / (China) Xun Fangying
- (Hong Kong) Ng Kwan-yau / (China) Zheng Saisai

The following pair received entry as alternates:

- (Netherlands) Lesley Pattinama Kerkhove / (India) Ankita Raina

=== Withdrawals ===
Before the tournament

- (Kazakhstan) Elena Rybakina (left thigh injury)
