= 2017 Guangzhou International Women's Open – Singles =

Singles
- 2017 Guangzhou International Women's Open

Final
- Champion: (China) Zhang Shuai
- Runner-up: (Serbia) Aleksandra Krunić
- Score: 6–2, 3–6, 6–2

Details
- Draw: 32
- Seeds: 8

Events
Singles	Doubles
- Guangzhou International Women's Open

Lesia Tsurenko was the defending champion, but lost in the first round to Aleksandra Krunić.

Zhang Shuai won the title for a second time, defeating Krunić in the final, 6–2, 3–6, 6–2.

== Seeds ==
1. (China) Peng Shuai (second round)
2. (China) Zhang Shuai (champion)
3. (Estonia) Anett Kontaveit (second round)
4. (Ukraine) Lesia Tsurenko (first round)
5. (Belgium) Elise Mertens (first round)
6. (France) Alizé Cornet (quarterfinals)
7. (Australia) Samantha Stosur (first round)
8. (United States) Alison Riske (first round)

== Draw ==
Key

- Q = Qualifier
- WC = Wild card
- LL = Lucky loser
- Alt = Alternate
- ITF = ITF entry
- PR = Protected ranking
- SR = Special ranking
- SE = Special exempt
- JE = Junior exempt
- JR = Junior Accelerator Programme entrant
- CO = College Accelerator Programme entrant
- NG = Next Gen Accelerator Program entrant
- w/o = Walkover
- r = Retired
- d = Defaulted

=== Finals ===
Semifinals
(Belgium) Yanina Wickmayer	3	3
(Serbia) Aleksandra Krunić	6	6
(Russia) Evgeniya Rodina	6^{7}	3
2/WC	(China) Zhang Shuai	7^{9}	6

Final
(Serbia) Aleksandra Krunić	2	6	2
2/WC	(China) Zhang Shuai	6	3	6

=== Top half ===
First round
1/WC	(China) S Peng	7^{7}	1	6
(Tunisia) O Jabeur	6^{4}	6	3
Q	(Netherlands) L Kerkhove	6^{1}	6^{4}
(Belgium) Y Wickmayer	7^{7}	7^{7}
(Romania) PM Țig	2	2^{r}
(Montenegro) D Kovinić	6	4
(United States) B Pera	6	2	2
6	(France) A Cornet	4	6	6
4	(Ukraine) L Tsurenko	3	4
(Serbia) A Krunić	6	6
(Germany) M Barthel	6	4	6
Q	(China) Jin Lu	0	6	3
Q	(China) K Zhang	2	6	6
(Croatia) J Fett	6	1	3
PR	(Sweden) R Peterson	6	6
8	(United States) A Riske	3	2

Second round
1/WC	(China) S Peng	4	4
(Belgium) Y Wickmayer	6	6
(Montenegro) D Kovinić	6^{4}	6	3
6	(France) A Cornet	7^{7}	2	6
(Serbia) A Krunić	6	6
(Germany) M Barthel	4	0
Q	(China) K Zhang	3	0
PR	(Sweden) R Peterson	6	6

Quarterfinals
(Belgium) Y Wickmayer	6	7^{7}
6	(France) A Cornet	1	6^{5}
(Serbia) A Krunić	6	6
PR	(Sweden) R Peterson	1	1

Semifinals
(Belgium) Y Wickmayer	3	3
(Serbia) A Krunić	6	6

=== Bottom half ===
First round
5	(Belgium) E Mertens	2	6^{5}
(China) Y Wang	6	7^{7}
(Australia) Ar Rodionova	6^{3}	6	0
(Russia) E Rodina	7^{7}	3	6
Q	(Australia) L Cabrera	6	7
Q	(China) X Gao	3	5
(Italy) J Paolini	0	2
3	(Estonia) A Kontaveit	6	6
7	(Australia) S Stosur	7^{8}	3	5
(China) X Han	6^{6}	6	7
(Ukraine) K Kozlova	7	6
(China) F Liu	5	0
(Greece) M Sakkari	0	3
Q	(Turkey) İ Soylu	6	6
WC	(China) X You	1	0
2/WC	(China) S Zhang	6	6

Second round
(China) Y Wang	1	2
(Russia) E Rodina	6	6
Q	(Australia) L Cabrera	6	7
3	(Estonia) A Kontaveit	0	5
(China) X Han	0	0
(Ukraine) K Kozlova	6	6
Q	(Turkey) İ Soylu	0	0
2/WC	(China) S Zhang	6	6

Quarterfinals
(Russia) E Rodina	6	7^{7}
Q	(Australia) L Cabrera	1	6^{4}
(Ukraine) K Kozlova	1	1
2/WC	(China) S Zhang	6	6

Semifinals
(Russia) E Rodina	6^{7}	3
2/WC	(China) S Zhang	7^{9}	6

== Qualifying ==
=== Seeds ===
1. (Australia) Lizette Cabrera (qualified)
2. (Netherlands) Lesley Kerkhove (qualified)
3. (Turkey) İpek Soylu (qualified)
4. (China) Gao Xinyu (qualified)
5. (China) Lu Jingjing (qualified)
6. (United States) Jacqueline Cako (qualifying competition)
7. (Japan) Junri Namigata (qualifying competition)
8. (Japan) Riko Sawayanagi (qualifying competition)
9. (China) Zhang Kailin (qualified)
10. (China) Lu Jiajing (qualifying competition)
11. (Japan) Hiroko Kuwata (first round)
12. (China) Xun Fangying (first round)

=== Qualifiers ===
1. (Australia) Lizette Cabrera
2. (Netherlands) Lesley Kerkhove
3. (Turkey) İpek Soylu
4. (China) Gao Xinyu
5. (China) Lu Jingjing
6. (China) Zhang Kailin

=== Qualifying draw ===
==== First qualifier ====
First round
1	(Australia) Lizette Cabrera	7^{7}	6
(Bulgaria) Aleksandrina Naydenova	6^{1}	4
(Turkey) Pemra Özgen	7	6
12	(China) Xun Fangying	5	1

Qualifying competition
1	(Australia) Lizette Cabrera	6	4	6
(Turkey) Pemra Özgen	3	6	0

==== Second qualifier ====
First round
2	(Netherlands) Lesley Kerkhove	6	6
(Russia) Alexandra Panova	4	4
WC	(China) Sun Xuliu	3	4
8	(Japan) Riko Sawayanagi	6	6

Qualifying competition
2	(Netherlands) Lesley Kerkhove	6	7
8	(Japan) Riko Sawayanagi	1	5

==== Third qualifier ====
First round
3	(Turkey) İpek Soylu	6	6
WC	(China) Guo Meiqi	2	1
(Japan) Kyōka Okamura	6	7^{7}
11	(Japan) Hiroko Kuwata	4	6^{4}

Qualifying competition
3	(Turkey) İpek Soylu	7^{7}	6
(Japan) Kyōka Okamura	6^{5}	3

==== Fourth qualifier ====
First round
4	(China) Gao Xinyu	2	6	7^{9}
(China) Guo Hanyu	6	4	6^{7}
(Japan) Shiho Akita	3	1
10	(China) Lu Jiajing	6	6

Qualifying competition
4	(China) Gao Xinyu	6	2	6
10	(China) Lu Jiajing	4	6	3

==== Fifth qualifier ====
First round
5	(China) Lu Jingjing	4	6	7^{7}
(Japan) Miyabi Inoue	6	1	6^{2}
WC	(China) Zheng Wushuang	5	1
7	(Japan) Junri Namigata	7	6

Qualifying competition
5	(China) Lu Jingjing	5	6	6
7	(Japan) Junri Namigata	7	1	3

==== Sixth qualifier ====
First round
6	(United States) Jacqueline Cako	6	4	6
(Russia) Anastasia Pivovarova	3	6	3
WC	(China) Ye Qiuyu	6^{8}	6	3
9	(China) Zhang Kailin	7^{10}	4	6

Qualifying competition
6	(United States) Jacqueline Cako	2	4
9	(China) Zhang Kailin	6	6
