= 2018 Guangzhou International Women's Open – Singles =

Singles
- 2018 Guangzhou International Women's Open

Final
- Champion: (China) Wang Qiang
- Runner-up: (Kazakhstan) Yulia Putintseva
- Score: 6–1, 6–2

Details
- Draw: 32
- Seeds: 8

Events
Singles	Doubles
- Guangzhou International Women's Open

Zhang Shuai was the defending champion, but she withdrew before her first round match against Wang Yafan.

Wang Qiang won the title, defeating Yulia Putintseva in the final, 6–1, 6–2.

== Seeds ==
1. (France) Alizé Cornet (first round)
2. (China) Zhang Shuai (withdrew)
3. (China) Wang Qiang (champion)
4. (Serbia) Aleksandra Krunić (quarterfinals)
5. (Kazakhstan) Yulia Putintseva (final)
6. (Slovakia) Viktória Kužmová (second round)
7. (Belarus) Vera Lapko (quarterfinals)
8. (China) Zheng Saisai (second round)

== Draw ==
Key

- Q = Qualifier
- WC = Wild card
- LL = Lucky loser
- Alt = Alternate
- ITF = ITF entry
- PR = Protected ranking
- SR = Special ranking
- SE = Special exempt
- JE = Junior exempt
- JR = Junior Accelerator Programme entrant
- CO = College Accelerator Programme entrant
- NG = Next Gen Accelerator Program entrant
- w/o = Walkover
- r = Retired
- d = Defaulted

=== Finals ===
Semifinals
5	(Kazakhstan) Yulia Putintseva	6	6
(United States) Bernarda Pera	1	4
3	(China) Wang Qiang	6	6
(Germany) Andrea Petkovic	2	2

Final
5	(Kazakhstan) Yulia Putintseva	1	2
3	(China) Wang Qiang	6	6

=== Top half ===
First round
1	(France) A Cornet	0	3
(United States) J Brady	6	6
(Ukraine) K Kozlova	6	7^{7}
Q	(China) Jia Lu	0	6^{4}
WC	(Russia) V Zvonareva	4	2
PR	(Germany) S Lisicki	6	6
(Spain) S Sorribes Tormo	1	1
5	(Kazakhstan) Y Putintseva	6	6
4	(Serbia) A Krunić	6	6
(Switzerland) V Golubic	4	3
(Romania) A Bogdan	6	3	1^{r}
(United States) C McHale	4	6	3
(United States) B Pera	7^{7}	6
(Poland) M Fręch	6^{3}	1
Q	(Serbia) I Jorović	2	3
6	(Slovakia) V Kužmová	6	6

Second round
(United States) J Brady
(Ukraine) K Kozlova	w/o
PR	(Germany) S Lisicki	3	3
5	(Kazakhstan) Y Putintseva	6	6
4	(Serbia) A Krunić	6	6
(United States) C McHale	3	3
(United States) B Pera	6	6
6	(Slovakia) V Kužmová	2	3

Quarterfinals
(Ukraine) K Kozlova	4	1
5	(Kazakhstan) Y Putintseva	6	6
4	(Serbia) A Krunić	6	3	4
(United States) B Pera	4	6	6

Semifinals
5	(Kazakhstan) Y Putintseva	6	6
(United States) B Pera	1	4

=== Bottom half ===
First round
8	(China) S Zheng	6	6
Q	(China) H Guo	4	2
(France) F Ferro	6	6
WC	(China) Xiy Wang	3	3
WC	(Russia) S Kuznetsova	3	6	6
Q	(India) K Thandi	6	3	2
(United States) N Gibbs	1	2
3	(China) Q Wang	6	6
7	(Belarus) V Lapko	6	6
PR	(United States) V King	2	1
Q	(Israel) D Khazaniuk	6	4	6
WC	(China) Xin Wang	4	6	3
(Germany) A Petkovic	1	6	6
Q	(Australia) L Cabrera	6	3	3
(China) Y Wang	6	6
LL	(China) L Zhu	2	2

Second round
8	(China) S Zheng	6	3	2
(France) F Ferro	0	6	6
WC	(Russia) S Kuznetsova	2	2
3	(China) Q Wang	6	6
7	(Belarus) V Lapko	6	7
Q	(Israel) D Khazaniuk	2	5
(Germany) A Petkovic	6	7^{7}
(China) Y Wang	4	6^{5}

Quarterfinals
(France) F Ferro	4	0
3	(China) Q Wang	6	6
7	(Belarus) V Lapko	2	6^{2}
(Germany) A Petkovic	6	7^{7}

Semifinals
3	(China) Q Wang	6	6
(Germany) A Petkovic	2	2

== Qualifying ==
=== Seeds ===
1. (China) Zhu Lin (qualifying competition, Lucky loser)
2. (United States) Claire Liu (qualifying competition)
3. (China) Han Xinyun (first round)
4. (Australia) Lizette Cabrera (qualified)
5. (Montenegro) Danka Kovinić (qualifying competition)
6. (China) Lu Jiajing (qualified)
7. (Serbia) Ivana Jorović (qualified)
8. (China) Xun Fangying (first round)
9. (India) Karman Thandi (qualified)
10. (Israel) Deniz Khazaniuk (qualified)
11. (China) Zhang Kailin (qualifying competition)
12. (Japan) Junri Namigata (qualifying competition)

=== Qualifiers ===
1. (Serbia) Ivana Jorović
2. (Israel) Deniz Khazaniuk
3. (China) Guo Hanyu
4. (Australia) Lizette Cabrera
5. (India) Karman Thandi
6. (China) Lu Jiajing

=== Lucky loser ===
1. (China) Zhu Lin

=== Qualifying draw ===
==== First qualifier ====
First round
1	(China) Zhu Lin	6	6
WC	(China) Wang Meiling	1	3
(Chinese Taipei) Liang En-shuo	1	1
7	(Serbia) Ivana Jorović	6	6

Qualifying competition
1	(China) Zhu Lin	2	1
7	(Serbia) Ivana Jorović	6	6

==== Second qualifier ====
First round
2	(United States) Claire Liu	6	6
WC	(China) Ren Jiaqi	3	0
(Papua New Guinea) Abigail Tere-Apisah	3	2
10	(Israel) Deniz Khazaniuk	6	6

Qualifying competition
2	(United States) Claire Liu	1	5
10	(Israel) Deniz Khazaniuk	6	7

==== Third qualifier ====
First round
3	(China) Han Xinyun	6	3	0
WC	(China) Guo Hanyu	3	6	6
(China) Yuan Yue	2	6	6
8	(China) Xun Fangying	6	4	3

Qualifying competition
WC	(China) Guo Hanyu	6	6
(China) Yuan Yue	2	4

==== Fourth qualifier ====
First round
4	(Australia) Lizette Cabrera	3	7^{7}	6
(China) Xu Shilin	6	6^{3}	3
(Japan) Hiroko Kuwata	1	2
11	(China) Zhang Kailin	6	6

Qualifying competition
4	(Australia) Lizette Cabrera	4	7	7^{7}
11	(China) Zhang Kailin	6	5	6^{1}

==== Fifth qualifier ====
First round
5	(Montenegro) Danka Kovinić	6	6
WC	(China) Liu Yanni	3	1
(China) Kang Jiaqi	2	2
9	(India) Karman Thandi	6	6

Qualifying competition
5	(Montenegro) Danka Kovinić	3	7	3
9	(India) Karman Thandi	6	5	6

==== Sixth qualifier ====
First round
6	(China) Lu Jiajing	6	6
(China) Sun Xuliu	0	1
(China) Gai Ao	1	6	1
12	(Japan) Junri Namigata	6	3	6

Qualifying competition
6	(China) Lu Jiajing	6	4	6
12	(Japan) Junri Namigata	2	6	4
