= 2019 WSG Open – Doubles =

Doubles
- 2019 WSG Open

Final
- Champions: (Poland) Maja Chwalińska (Norway) Ulrikke Eikeri
- Runners-up: (Poland) Weronika Falkowska (Poland) Martyna Kubka
- Score: 6–4, 6–1

Events
Singles	Doubles
← 2018 ·	WSG Open

Maja Chwalińska and Daria Kuczer were the defending champions, but chose to participate with different partners. Chwalińska played alongside Ulrikke Eikeri, while Kuczer partnered Stefania Rogozińska Dzik. The two teams played in the first round, with Chwalińska and Eikeri winning.

Chwalińska and Eikeri went on to win the title, defeating Weronika Falkowska and Martyna Kubka in the final, 6–4, 6–1.

== Seeds ==
1. (Poland) Paula Kania / (Poland) Katarzyna Piter (quarterfinals)
2. (Bulgaria) Elitsa Kostova / (Slovakia) Tereza Mihalíková (first round)
3. (Poland) Maja Chwalińska / (Norway) Ulrikke Eikeri (champions)
4. (Germany) Vivian Heisen / (Ukraine) Ganna Poznikhirenko (first round)

== Draw ==
=== Key ===
- Q = Qualifier
- WC = Wild card
- LL = Lucky loser
- Alt = Alternate
- ITF = ITF entry
- PR = Protected ranking
- SR = Special ranking
- SE = Special exempt
- JE = Junior exempt
- JR = Junior Accelerator Programme entrant
- CO = College Accelerator Programme entrant
- NG = Next Gen Accelerator Program entrant
- w/o = Walkover
- r = Retired
- d = Defaulted

=== Draw ===
First round
1	(Poland) P Kania (Poland) K Piter	7	7
(Romania) M Bulgaru (Romania) N Dascălu	5	5
(Italy) L Bronzetti (Italy) C Rosatello	6	7^{7}
(Bulgaria) I Shinikova (Slovakia) R Šramková	3	6^{2}
4	(Germany) V Heisen (Ukraine) G Poznikhirenko	4	6	[10]
WC	(Poland) W Falkowska (Poland) M Kubka	6	4	[12]
WC	(Poland) K Jans-Ignacik (Poland) Z Szczepańska	2	5
Alt	(Poland) A Hertel (Ukraine) A Shoshyna	6	7
Alt	(Ukraine) M Chernyshova (Russia) D Lodikova	6	2	[4]
Alt	(Russia) A Komardina (Turkey) İ Öz	3	6	[10]
WC	(Poland) D Kuczer (Poland) S Rogozińska Dzik	4	4
3	(Poland) M Chwalińska (Norway) U Eikeri	6	6
(Belarus) I Kremen (Belarus) I Shymanovich	3	6	[10]
(Russia) S Lansere (Russia) K Rakhimova	6	2	[7]
(Czech Republic) A Dețiuc (Czech Republic) J Marková	6	7^{7}
2	(Bulgaria) E Kostova (Slovakia) T Mihalíková	4	6^{3}

Quarterfinals
1	(Poland) P Kania (Poland) K Piter
(Italy) L Bronzetti (Italy) C Rosatello	w/o
WC	(Poland) W Falkowska (Poland) M Kubka	6	6
Alt	(Poland) A Hertel (Ukraine) A Shoshyna	2	4
Alt	(Russia) A Komardina (Turkey) İ Öz	2	1
3	(Poland) M Chwalińska (Norway) U Eikeri	6	6
(Belarus) I Kremen (Belarus) I Shymanovich	6	1	[4]
(Czech Republic) A Dețiuc (Czech Republic) J Marková	3	6	[10]

Semifinals
(Italy) L Bronzetti (Italy) C Rosatello	3	4
WC	(Poland) W Falkowska (Poland) M Kubka	6	6
3	(Poland) M Chwalińska (Norway) U Eikeri	6	7
(Czech Republic) A Dețiuc (Czech Republic) J Marková	4	5

Final
WC	(Poland) W Falkowska (Poland) M Kubka	4	1
3	(Poland) M Chwalińska (Norway) U Eikeri	6	6
