= 2016 Guangzhou International Women's Open – Doubles =

Doubles
- 2016 Guangzhou International Women's Open

Final
- Champions: (United States) Asia Muhammad (China) Peng Shuai
- Runners-up: (Belarus) Olga Govortsova (Belarus) Vera Lapko
- Score: 6–2, 7–6^{(7–3)}

Events
Singles	Doubles
← 2015 ·	Guangzhou International Women's Open	· 2017 →

Martina Hingis and Sania Mirza were the defending champions, but Mirza chose to compete in Tokyo instead. Hingis played alongside Jelena Janković, but lost in the semifinals to Olga Govortsova and Vera Lapko.

Asia Muhammad and Peng Shuai won the title, defeating Govortsova and Lapko in the final, 6–2, 7–6^{(7–3)}.

== Seeds ==
1. (Argentina) María Irigoyen / (Germany) Tatjana Maria (quarterfinals)
2. (Ukraine) Lyudmyla Kichenok / (Ukraine) Nadiia Kichenok (quarterfinals)
3. (Switzerland) Martina Hingis / (Serbia) Jelena Janković (semifinals)
4. (United States) Asia Muhammad / (China) Peng Shuai (champions)

== Draw ==
=== Key ===
- Q = Qualifier
- WC = Wild card
- LL = Lucky loser
- Alt = Alternate
- SE = Special exempt
- PR = Protected ranking
- ITF = ITF entry
- JE = Junior exempt
- w/o = Walkover
- r = Retired
- d = Defaulted
- SR = Special ranking

First round
1	(Argentina) M Irigoyen (Germany) T Maria	6	6
(Chinese Taipei) C-w Chan (Chinese Taipei) C-w Hsu	2	3
(China) C Liu (China) J Lu	7^{7}	6
(China) X Han (Japan) J Namigata	6^{3}	4
4	(United States) A Muhammad (China) S Peng	6	6
WC	(Hong Kong) K-y Ng (China) S Zheng	1	2
(China) Y Li (Japan) Y Tanaka	3	6^{2}
(United States) J Brady (United States) A Riske	6	7^{7}
(Switzerland) V Golubic (Turkey) İ Soylu	6	6
(China) X You (China) L Zhu	3	0
(United Kingdom) J Rae (United Kingdom) A Smith	3	7^{7}	[5]
3	(Switzerland) M Hingis (Serbia) J Janković	6	6^{5}	[10]
(Uzbekistan) N Abduraimova (China) F Xun	1	4
WC	(Belarus) O Govortsova (Belarus) V Lapko	6	6
(Belarus) L Marozava (Georgia (country)) S Shapatava	3	1
2	(Ukraine) L Kichenok (Ukraine) N Kichenok	6	6

Quarterfinals
1	(Argentina) M Irigoyen (Germany) T Maria	5	5
(China) C Liu (China) J Lu	7	7
4	(United States) A Muhammad (China) S Peng	6	6
(United States) J Brady (United States) A Riske	1	2
(Switzerland) V Golubic (Turkey) İ Soylu	0	1
3	(Switzerland) M Hingis (Serbia) J Janković	6	6
WC	(Belarus) O Govortsova (Belarus) V Lapko	6	2	[11]
2	(Ukraine) L Kichenok (Ukraine) N Kichenok	3	6	[9]

Semifinals
(China) C Liu (China) J Lu	3	4
4	(United States) A Muhammad (China) S Peng	6	6
3	(Switzerland) M Hingis (Serbia) J Janković	4	6	[8]
WC	(Belarus) O Govortsova (Belarus) V Lapko	6	3	[10]

Final
4	(United States) A Muhammad (China) S Peng	6	7^{7}
WC	(Belarus) O Govortsova (Belarus) V Lapko	2	6^{3}
