= 2019 Guangzhou International Women's Open – Doubles =

Doubles
- 2019 Guangzhou International Women's Open

Final
- Champions: (China) Peng Shuai (Germany) Laura Siegemund
- Runners-up: (Chile) Alexa Guarachi (Mexico) Giuliana Olmos
- Score: 6–2, 6–1

Details
- Draw: 16
- Seeds: 4

Events
Singles	Doubles
← 2018 ·	Guangzhou International Women's Open	· 2023 →

Monique Adamczak and Jessica Moore were the defending champions, but Adamczak chose to compete in Osaka instead. Moore played alongside Dalila Jakupović, but lost in the first round to Alexa Guarachi and Giuliana Olmos.

Peng Shuai and Laura Siegemund won the title, defeating Guarachi and Olmos in the final, 6–2, 6–1.

== Seeds ==
1. (Australia) Samantha Stosur / (China) Zhang Shuai (first round)
2. (China) Duan Yingying / (China) Yang Zhaoxuan (semifinals)
3. (Serbia) Aleksandra Krunić / (Belarus) Lidziya Marozava (semifinals)
4. (Australia) Ellen Perez / (United States) Sabrina Santamaria (first round)

== Draw ==
=== Key ===
- Q = Qualifier
- WC = Wild card
- LL = Lucky loser
- Alt = Alternate
- SE = Special exempt
- PR = Protected ranking
- ITF = ITF entry
- JE = Junior exempt
- w/o = Walkover
- r = Retired
- d = Defaulted
- SR = Special ranking

=== Draw ===
First round
1	(Australia) S Stosur (China) S Zhang	2	6	[7]
(United States) K Christian (Canada) S Fichman	6	2	[10]
(Slovenia) D Jakupović (Australia) J Moore	6	5	[3]
(Chile) A Guarachi (Mexico) G Olmos	2	7	[10]
3	(Serbia) A Krunić (Belarus) L Marozava	6	6
Alt	(Netherlands) L Pattinama Kerkhove (India) A Raina	3	1
WC	(China) Jia Lu (China) F Xun	0	3
(Czech Republic) M Bouzková (Slovenia) T Zidanšek	6	6
(Spain) G García Pérez (United States) D Krawczyk	5	4
(Australia) A Bai (France) E Lechemia	7	6
(China) S Peng (Germany) L Siegemund	6	7
4	(Australia) E Perez (United States) S Santamaria	3	5
(China) X Jiang (China) Q Tang	6	4	[5]
(Australia) Ar Rodionova (Belgium) Y Wickmayer	4	6	[10]
WC	(Hong Kong) K-y Ng (China) S Zheng	4	0
2	(China) Y Duan (China) Z Yang	6	6

Quarterfinals
(United States) K Christian (Canada) S Fichman	2	1
(Chile) A Guarachi (Mexico) G Olmos	6	6
3	(Serbia) A Krunić (Belarus) L Marozava	6	6
(Czech Republic) M Bouzková (Slovenia) T Zidanšek	3	3
(Australia) A Bai (France) E Lechemia	1	2
(China) S Peng (Germany) L Siegemund	6	6
(Australia) Ar Rodionova (Belgium) Y Wickmayer	4	3
2	(China) Y Duan (China) Z Yang	6	6

Semifinals
(Chile) A Guarachi (Mexico) G Olmos	7^{7}	6
3	(Serbia) A Krunić (Belarus) L Marozava	6^{3}	3
(China) S Peng (Germany) L Siegemund	6	6
2	(China) Y Duan (China) Z Yang	4	0

Final
(Chile) A Guarachi (Mexico) G Olmos	2	1
(China) S Peng (Germany) L Siegemund	6	6
