= 2017 Guangzhou International Women's Open – Doubles =

Doubles
- 2017 Guangzhou International Women's Open

Final
- Champions: (Belgium) Elise Mertens (Netherlands) Demi Schuurs
- Runners-up: (Australia) Monique Adamczak (Australia) Storm Sanders
- Score: 6–2, 6–3

Events
Singles	Doubles
← 2016 ·	Guangzhou International Women's Open	· 2018 →

Asia Muhammad and Peng Shuai were the defending champions, but chose not to participate this year.

Elise Mertens and Demi Schuurs won the title, defeating Monique Adamczak and Storm Sanders in the final, 6–2, 6–3.

== Seeds ==
1. (Belgium) Elise Mertens / (Netherlands) Demi Schuurs (champions)
2. (Australia) Monique Adamczak / (Australia) Storm Sanders (final)
3. (Netherlands) Lesley Kerkhove / (Belarus) Lidziya Marozava (semifinals)
4. (United States) Jacqueline Cako / (Bulgaria) Aleksandrina Naydenova (first round)

== Draw ==
=== Key ===
- Q = Qualifier
- WC = Wild card
- LL = Lucky loser
- Alt = Alternate
- ITF = ITF entry
- PR = Protected ranking
- SR = Special ranking
- SE = Special exempt
- JE = Junior exempt
- JR = Junior Accelerator Programme entrant
- CO = College Accelerator Programme entrant
- NG = Next Gen Accelerator Program entrant
- w/o = Walkover
- r = Retired
- d = Defaulted

First round
1	(Belgium) E Mertens (Netherlands) D Schuurs	6	6
(China) Jia Lu (Turkey) İ Soylu	4	1
(Australia) L Cabrera (Croatia) J Fett	6	7^{7}
(Japan) K Okamura (China) X You	3	6^{5}
4	(United States) J Cako (Bulgaria) A Naydenova	2	1
(China) X Jiang (China) Q Tang	6	6
(Japan) J Namigata (Japan) R Sawayanagi	1	7	[10]
(Serbia) A Krunić (Russia) A Panova	6	5	[7]
WC	(China) M Guo (China) X Sun	1	2
(China) C Liang (China) Jin Lu	6	6
(Japan) H Kuwata (China) Q Ye	2	3
3	(Netherlands) L Kerkhove (Belarus) L Marozava	6	6
(Japan) M Inoue (China) F Liu	2	1
(United States) A Riske (Belgium) Y Wickmayer	6	6
(China) X Gao (China) F Xun	2	2
2	(Australia) M Adamczak (Australia) S Sanders	6	6

Quarterfinals
1	(Belgium) E Mertens (Netherlands) D Schuurs	4
(Australia) L Cabrera (Croatia) J Fett	1^{r}
(China) X Jiang (China) Q Tang	6	7
(Japan) J Namigata (Japan) R Sawayanagi	4	5
(China) C Liang (China) Jin Lu	5	3
3	(Netherlands) L Kerkhove (Belarus) L Marozava	7	6
(United States) A Riske (Belgium) Y Wickmayer	6^{5}	3
2	(Australia) M Adamczak (Australia) S Sanders	7^{7}	6

Semifinals
1	(Belgium) E Mertens (Netherlands) D Schuurs	6	6
(China) X Jiang (China) Q Tang	1	3
3	(Netherlands) L Kerkhove (Belarus) L Marozava	4	4
2	(Australia) M Adamczak (Australia) S Sanders	6	6

Final
1	(Belgium) E Mertens (Netherlands) D Schuurs	6	6
2	(Australia) M Adamczak (Australia) S Sanders	2	3
