= 2019 Guangzhou International Women's Open – Singles =

Singles
- 2019 Guangzhou International Women's Open

Final
- Champion: (United States) Sofia Kenin
- Runner-up: (Australia) Samantha Stosur
- Score: 6–7^{(4–7)}, 6–4, 6–2

Details
- Draw: 32
- Seeds: 8

Events
Singles	Doubles
- Guangzhou International Women's Open

Wang Qiang was the defending champion, but lost in the first round to Peng Shuai.

Sofia Kenin won the title, defeating Samantha Stosur in the final, 6–7^{(4–7)}, 6–4, 6–2. This marked Stosur's last appearance in a WTA singles final before her retirement in 2022.

== Seeds ==
1. (Ukraine) Elina Svitolina (second round, retired)
2. (China) Wang Qiang (first round)
3. (United States) Sofia Kenin (champion)
4. (China) Zhang Shuai (quarterfinals)
5. (Czech Republic) Kateřina Siniaková (second round)
6. (China) Zheng Saisai (second round)
7. (Belarus) Aliaksandra Sasnovich (first round)
8. (Tunisia) Ons Jabeur (first round)

== Draw ==
Key

- Q = Qualifier
- WC = Wild card
- LL = Lucky loser
- Alt = Alternate
- ITF = ITF entry
- PR = Protected ranking
- SR = Special ranking
- SE = Special exempt
- JE = Junior exempt
- JR = Junior Accelerator Programme entrant
- CO = College Accelerator Programme entrant
- NG = Next Gen Accelerator Program entrant
- w/o = Walkover
- r = Retired
- d = Defaulted

=== Finals ===
Semifinals
(Russia) Anna Blinkova	6^{2}	6	1
3	(United States) Sofia Kenin	7^{7}	4	6
(Switzerland) Viktorija Golubic	6	6^{4}	1
WC	(Australia) Samantha Stosur	2	7^{7}	6

Final
3	(United States) Sofia Kenin	6^{4}	6	6
WC	(Australia) Samantha Stosur	7^{7}	4	2

=== Top half ===
First round
1	(Ukraine) E Svitolina	6	6
LL	(Slovenia) D Jakupović	3	3
(Czech Republic) M Bouzková	6	2	7^{8}
Q	(China) F Xun	3	6	6^{6}
(Russia) A Blinkova	2	6	4
(Spain) S Sorribes Tormo	6	1	1^{r}
(Serbia) A Krunić	6	6
7	(Belarus) A Sasnovich	4	2
3	(United States) S Kenin	6	6
(Germany) L Siegemund	4	2
Q	(Ukraine) K Zavatska	5	7^{8}	6
(France) F Ferro	7	6^{6}	4
(Slovenia) T Zidanšek	6	3	3
Q	(Italy) J Paolini	3	6	6
WC	(China) Y Duan	7^{7}	6^{3}	1
6	(China) S Zheng	6^{5}	7^{7}	6

Second round
1	(Ukraine) E Svitolina	4	3^{r}
(Czech Republic) M Bouzková	6	4
(Russia) A Blinkova	6	7
(Serbia) A Krunić	2	5
3	(United States) S Kenin	6	6
Q	(Ukraine) K Zavatska	4	2
Q	(Italy) J Paolini	7	3	7
6	(China) S Zheng	5	6	5

Quarterfinals
(Czech Republic) M Bouzková	3	1
(Russia) A Blinkova	6	6
3	(United States) S Kenin	7	6
Q	(Italy) J Paolini	5	1

Semifinals
(Russia) A Blinkova	6^{2}	6	1
3	(United States) S Kenin	7^{7}	4	6

=== Bottom half ===
First round
5	(Czech Republic) K Siniaková	6	3
(Kazakhstan) E Rybakina	1	1^{r}
(Switzerland) V Golubic	6	6
LL	(China) X Wang	3	3
(Germany) A Petkovic	7	6^{4}	6
Q	(Netherlands) L Pattinama Kerkhove	5	7^{7}	3
(Ukraine) K Kozlova	2	4
4	(China) S Zhang	6	6
8	(Tunisia) O Jabeur	4	3
(United States) B Pera	6	6
WC	(Australia) S Stosur	6	6
Q	(Czech Republic) T Martincová	2	4
Q	(Poland) M Fręch	5	6^{4}
SE	(Serbia) N Stojanović	7	7^{7}
WC	(China) S Peng	7	6
2	(China) Q Wang	5	2

Second round
5	(Czech Republic) K Siniaková	6	5	0
(Switzerland) V Golubic	4	7	6
(Germany) A Petkovic	5	4
4	(China) S Zhang	7	6
(United States) B Pera	4	6	6^{5}
WC	(Australia) S Stosur	6	1	7^{7}
SE	(Serbia) N Stojanović	7^{7}	2	6
WC	(China) S Peng	6^{4}	6	0

Quarterfinals
(Switzerland) V Golubic	6	3	6
4	(China) S Zhang	3	6	4
WC	(Australia) S Stosur	6	7^{7}
SE	(Serbia) N Stojanović	2	6^{1}

Semifinals
(Switzerland) V Golubic	6	6^{4}	1
WC	(Australia) S Stosur	2	7^{7}	6

== Qualifying ==
=== Seeds ===
1. (China) Zhu Lin (withdrew, still competing in Nanchang)
2. (United States) Varvara Lepchenko (first round, retired)
3. (Italy) Jasmine Paolini (qualified)
4. (Czech Republic) Tereza Martincová (qualified)
5. (Serbia) Nina Stojanović (Received special exempt into main draw)
6. (Ukraine) Katarina Zavatska (qualified)
7. (China) Wang Xiyu (qualifying competition, lucky loser)
8. (Slovenia) Dalila Jakupović (qualifying competition, lucky loser)
9. (Netherlands) Bibiane Schoofs (first round)
10. (Belgium) Yanina Wickmayer (withdrew, still competing in Zhengzhou)
11. (United States) Sachia Vickery (first round)
12. (Netherlands) Lesley Pattinama Kerkhove (qualified)

=== Qualifiers ===
1. (China) Xun Fangying
2. (Poland) Magdalena Fręch
3. (Italy) Jasmine Paolini
4. (Czech Republic) Tereza Martincová
5. (Netherlands) Lesley Pattinama Kerkhove
6. (Ukraine) Katarina Zavatska

=== Lucky losers ===
1. (China) Wang Xiyu
2. (Slovenia) Dalila Jakupović

=== Draw ===
==== First qualifier ====
First round
Alt	(Australia) Kaylah McPhee	4	1
WC	(China) Xun Fangying	6	6
(China) Xu Shilin	1	1
Alt	(Australia) Arina Rodionova	6	6

Qualifying competition
WC	(China) Xun Fangying	6	4	7^{7}
Alt	(Australia) Arina Rodionova	2	6	6^{1}

==== Second qualifier ====
First round
2	(United States) Varvara Lepchenko	2	0^{r}
(Poland) Magdalena Fręch	6	3
(India) Ankita Raina	6	6
11	(United States) Sachia Vickery	3	2

Qualifying competition
(Poland) Magdalena Fręch	6	6
(India) Ankita Raina	1	1

==== Third qualifier ====
First round
3	(Italy) Jasmine Paolini	6	5	6
(Chinese Taipei) Liang En-shuo	4	7	4
(Serbia) Natalija Kostić	2	2
8	(Slovenia) Dalila Jakupović	6	6

Qualifying competition
3	(Italy) Jasmine Paolini	4	6	6
8	(Slovenia) Dalila Jakupović	6	1	4

==== Fourth qualifier ====
First round
4	(Czech Republic) Tereza Martincová	6	7
(Australia) Lizette Cabrera	4	5
(China) Lu Jiajing	6	6
9	(Netherlands) Bibiane Schoofs	3	2

Qualifying competition
4	(Czech Republic) Tereza Martincová	6	6
(China) Lu Jiajing	2	1

==== Fifth qualifier ====
First round
Alt	(Spain) Georgina García Pérez	6	4	6^{4}
WC	(China) Ma Shuyue	4	6	7^{7}
Alt	(Australia) Jaimee Fourlis	4	3
12	(Netherlands) Lesley Pattinama Kerkhove	6	6

Qualifying competition
WC	(China) Ma Shuyue	2	4
12	(Netherlands) Lesley Pattinama Kerkhove	6	6

==== Sixth qualifier ====
First round
6	(Ukraine) Katarina Zavatska	6	6
WC	(Italy) Sara Errani	2	2
WC	(China) Wei Sijia	2	3
7	(China) Wang Xiyu	6	6

Qualifying competition
6	(Ukraine) Katarina Zavatska	6^{3}	6	6
7	(China) Wang Xiyu	7^{7}	1	4
