= 2018 Guangzhou International Women's Open – Doubles =

Doubles
- 2018 Guangzhou International Women's Open

Final
- Champions: (Australia) Monique Adamczak (Australia) Jessica Moore
- Runners-up: (Montenegro) Danka Kovinić (Belarus) Vera Lapko
- Score: 4–6, 7–5, [10–4]

Events
| Singles | Doubles |
| ← 2017 · | Guangzhou International Women's Open | · 2019 → |

Elise Mertens and Demi Schuurs were the defending champions, but chose not to participate.

Monique Adamczak and Jessica Moore won the title, defeating in the final Danka Kovinić and Vera Lapko with the score 4–6, 7–5, [10–4].

== Seeds ==
1. (United States) Kaitlyn Christian / (United States) Sabrina Santamaria (semifinals)
2. (Kazakhstan) Galina Voskoboeva / (Russia) Vera Zvonareva (quarterfinals)
3. (Australia) Monique Adamczak / (Australia) Jessica Moore (champions)
4. (China) Jiang Xinyu / (China) Tang Qianhui (semifinals)

== Draw ==
=== Key ===
- Q = Qualifier
- WC = Wild card
- LL = Lucky loser
- Alt = Alternate
- SE = Special exempt
- PR = Protected ranking
- ITF = ITF entry
- JE = Junior exempt
- w/o = Walkover
- r = Retired
- d = Defaulted
- SR = Special ranking

=== Draw ===
First round
1 | (United States) K Christian (United States) S Santamaria | 6 | 6
(Indonesia) B Gumulya (Montenegro) A Veselinović | 2 | 2
(China) Jia Lu (Japan) J Namigata | 6 | 7^{7}
(Indonesia) J Rompies (Papua New Guinea) A Tere-Apisah | 2 | 6^{5}
3 | (Australia) M Adamczak (Australia) J Moore | 6 | 7^{7}
(Chinese Taipei) P-h Chen (Chinese Taipei) F-h Wu | 4 | 6^{3}
(China) F Xun (China) L Zhu | 6 | 6
(Israel) D Khazaniuk (United States) C Liu | 2 | 4
(China) H Guo (India) P Thombare | 1 | 2
(China) X Han (China) Yi Zhang | 6 | 6
WC | (Hong Kong) K-y Ng (China) S Zheng | 4 | 4
4 | (China) X Jiang (China) Q Tang | 6 | 6
(Montenegro) D Kovinić (Belarus) V Lapko | 6 | 6
(China) Xin Wang (China) Xiy Wang | 2 | 1
(China) S Feng (China) J Kang | 4 | 2
2 | (Kazakhstan) G Voskoboeva (Russia) V Zvonareva | 6 | 6

Quarterfinals
1 | (United States) K Christian (United States) S Santamaria | 6 | 6
(China) Jia Lu (Japan) J Namigata | 3 | 4
3 | (Australia) M Adamczak (Australia) J Moore | 7 | 6
(China) F Xun (China) L Zhu | 5 | 2
(China) X Han (China) Yi Zhang | 4 | 4
4 | (China) X Jiang (China) Q Tang | 6 | 6
(Montenegro) D Kovinić (Belarus) V Lapko | 6 | 6
2 | (Kazakhstan) G Voskoboeva (Russia) V Zvonareva | 3 | 3

Semifinals
1 | (United States) K Christian (United States) S Santamaria | 0 | 6 | [10]
3 | (Australia) M Adamczak (Australia) J Moore | 6 | 3 | [12]
4 | (China) X Jiang (China) Q Tang | 5 | 3
(Montenegro) D Kovinić (Belarus) V Lapko | 7 | 6

Final
3 | (Australia) M Adamczak (Australia) J Moore | 4 | 7 | [10]
(Montenegro) D Kovinić (Belarus) V Lapko | 6 | 5 | [4]
