= 2017 Guangzhou International Women's Open =

- Date: September 18–23
- Edition: 14th
- Category: WTA International
- Draw: 32S / 16D
- Prize money: $250,000
- Surface: Hard
- Location: Guangzhou, China
- Venue: Guangzhou International Tennis Center

Champions

Singles
- (China) Zhang Shuai

Doubles
- (Belgium) Elise Mertens / (Netherlands) Demi Schuurs
← 2016 ·	Guangzhou International Women's Open	· 2018 →

The 2017 Guangzhou International Women's Open was a women's tennis tournament played on outdoor hard courts. It was the 14th edition of the Guangzhou International Women's Open, and part of the WTA International tournaments of the 2017 WTA Tour. It took place in Guangzhou, China, from September 18 through September 23, 2017.

== Points and prize money ==
Event	W	F	SF	QF	Round of 16	Round of 32	Q	Q2	Q1
Singles	280	180	110	60	30	1	18	12	1
Doubles	280	180	110	60	1	—	—	—	—

=== Prize money ===
Event	W	F	SF	QF	Round of 16	Round of 32^{1}	Q2	Q1
Singles	$43,000	$21,400	$11,500	$6,175	$3,400	$2,100	$1,020	$600
Doubles *	$12,300	$6,400	$3,435	$1,820	$960	—	—	—

_{^{1} Qualifiers prize money is also the Round of 32 prize money}
_{* per team}

== Singles main-draw entrants ==
=== Seeds ===
Country	Player	Rank^{1}	Seed
CHN	Peng Shuai	24	1
CHN	Zhang Shuai	28	2
EST	Anett Kontaveit	30	3
UKR	Lesia Tsurenko	39	4
BEL	Elise Mertens	41	5
FRA	Alizé Cornet	45	6
AUS	Samantha Stosur	49	7
USA	Alison Riske	50	8

- ^{1} Rankings are as of September 11, 2017.

=== Other entrants ===
The following players received wildcards into the singles main draw:

- (China) Peng Shuai
- (China) You Xiaodi
- (China) Zhang Shuai

The following player received entry using a protected ranking:

- (Sweden) Rebecca Peterson

The following players received entry from the qualifying draw:

- (Australia) Lizette Cabrera
- (China) Gao Xinyu
- (Netherlands) Lesley Kerkhove
- (China) Lu Jingjing
- (Turkey) İpek Soylu
- (China) Zhang Kailin

=== Withdrawals ===
Before the tournament

- (Romania) Ana Bogdan → replaced by (Sweden) Rebecca Peterson
- (Germany) Sabine Lisicki → replaced by (Croatia) Jana Fett
- (China) Zheng Saisai → replaced by (Italy) Jasmine Paolini
- (China) Zhu Lin → replaced by (Australia) Arina Rodionova

=== Retirements ===
- (Romania) Patricia Maria Tig

== Doubles main-draw entrants ==
=== Seeds ===
Country	Player	Country	Player	Rank^{1}	Seed
BEL	Elise Mertens	NED	Demi Schuurs	96	1
AUS	Monique Adamczak	AUS	Storm Sanders	165	2
NED	Lesley Kerkhove	BLR	Lidziya Marozava	206	3
USA	Jacqueline Cako	BUL	Aleksandrina Naydenova	210	4

- ^{1} Rankings are as of September 11, 2017.

=== Other entrants ===
The following pair received a wildcard into the doubles main draw:

- (China) Guo Meiqi / (China) Sun Xuliu

== Champions ==
=== Singles ===
- (China) Zhang Shuai def. (Serbia) Aleksandra Krunić, 6–2, 3–6, 6–2

=== Doubles ===
- (Belgium) Elise Mertens / (Netherlands) Demi Schuurs def. (Australia) Monique Adamczak / (Australia) Storm Sanders, 6–2, 6–3
