= 2019 WSG Open – Singles =

Singles
- 2019 WSG Open

Final
- Champion: (Poland) Maja Chwalińska
- Runner-up: (Russia) Anastasiya Komardina
- Score: 6–3, 6–0

Events
Singles	Doubles
← 2018 ·	WSG Open

Olga Ianchuk was the defending champion, but chose not to participate.

Maja Chwalińska won the title, defeating Anastasiya Komardina in the final, 6–3, 6–0.

== Seeds ==
1. (Slovakia) Rebecca Šramková (first round)
2. (Georgia (country)) Ekaterine Gorgodze (quarterfinals)
3. (Bulgaria) Isabella Shinikova (first round)
4. (Norway) Ulrikke Eikeri (first round)
5. (Bulgaria) Elitsa Kostova (second round)
6. (Russia) Valentina Ivakhnenko (second round)
7. (China) Yuan Yue (semifinals)
8. (France) Tessah Andrianjafitrimo (quarterfinals)

== Draw ==
=== Key ===
- Q = Qualifier
- WC = Wild card
- LL = Lucky loser
- Alt = Alternate
- SE = Special exempt
- PR = Protected ranking
- ITF = ITF entry
- JE = Junior exempt
- w/o = Walkover
- r = Retired
- d = Defaulted
- SR = Special ranking

=== Finals ===
Semifinals
(Russia) Anastasiya Komardina	6	6
7	(China) Yuan Yue	1	1
(Russia) Victoria Kan	2	1
(Poland) Maja Chwalińska	6	6

Final
(Russia) Anastasiya Komardina	3	0
(Poland) Maja Chwalińska	6	6

=== Top half ===
First round
1	(Slovakia) R Šramková	4	5
Q	(Czech Republic) A Dețiuc	6	7
Q	(Romania) N Dascălu	7^{10}	4	6
(Russia) K Rakhimova	6^{8}	6	4
WC	(Poland) Z Szczepańska	0	1
(Russia) A Komardina	6	6
(Italy) L Bronzetti	2	4
5	(Bulgaria) E Kostova	6	6
3	(Bulgaria) I Shinikova	4	2
(Italy) D Chiesa	6	6
Q	(Slovakia) V Juhászová	3	6	6
(Russia) S Lansere	6	4	3
(Poland) K Piter	6	6
Q	(Ukraine) M Chernyshova	3	4
WC	(Poland) S Rogozińska Dzik	7	3	1
7	(China) Y Yuan	5	6	6

Second round
Q	(Czech Republic) A Dețiuc	4	6	6
Q	(Romania) N Dascălu	6	4	4
(Russia) A Komardina	2	6	6
5	(Bulgaria) E Kostova	6	4	3
(Italy) D Chiesa	3
Q	(Slovakia) V Juhászová	0^{r}
(Poland) K Piter	5	3
7	(China) Y Yuan	7	6

Quarterfinals
Q	(Czech Republic) A Dețiuc	6^{0}	6	4
(Russia) A Komardina	7^{7}	4	6
(Italy) D Chiesa	3	6	5
7	(China) Y Yuan	6	3	7

Semifinals
(Russia) A Komardina	6	6
7	(China) Y Yuan	1	1

=== Bottom half ===
First round
8	(France) T Andrianjafitrimo	3	6	6
(Spain) O Sáez Larra	6	0	3
WC	(Poland) P Kania	6	0
(Serbia) D Radanović	3	0^{r}
Q	(Romania) A Ghițescu	1	2
(Russia) V Kan	6	6
Q	(Belarus) I Shymanovich	6	7^{7}
4	(Norway) U Eikeri	3	6^{5}
6	(Russia) V Ivakhnenko	6	6
(Turkey) İ Soylu	4	3
Q	(Italy) C Rosatello	3	6	2
(Poland) M Chwalińska	6	4	6
(Slovakia) T Mihalíková	4	4
Q	(Ukraine) A Shoshyna	6	6
WC	(Czech Republic) J Marková	4	4
2	(Georgia (country)) E Gorgodze	6	6

Second round
8	(France) T Andrianjafitrimo	6	3
WC	(Poland) P Kania	1	0^{r}
(Russia) V Kan	5	6	6
Q	(Belarus) I Shymanovich	7	4	4
6	(Russia) V Ivakhnenko	3	1
(Poland) M Chwalińska	6	6
Q	(Ukraine) A Shoshyna	6	1	1
2	(Georgia (country)) E Gorgodze	4	6	6

Quarterfinals
8	(France) T Andrianjafitrimo	6	2	4
(Russia) V Kan	4	6	6
(Poland) M Chwalińska	5	6	6
2	(Georgia (country)) E Gorgodze	7	3	3

Semifinals
(Russia) V Kan	2	1
(Poland) M Chwalińska	6	6
