= RWB Ladies Cup =

ITF Women's Tour
- Event name: RWB Ladies Cup (2019–current); O1 Properties Ladies Cup (2016–18)
- Location: Khimki, Russia
- Venue: Alexander Ostrovsky Academy
- Category: ITF $25,000
- Surface: Hard / Indoor
- Draw: 32S/32Q/16D
- Prize money: $25,000
- Website: schooltennis.ru

The RWB Ladies Cup (formerly known as the O1 Properties Ladies Cup) is a tournament for professional female tennis players played on indoor hard courts. The event is classified as a $25,000 ITF Women's Circuit tournament and has been held in Khimki, Russia, annually, since 2016. The event was held as a $100,000 tournament in 2018, but downgraded the following year to a $25,000 tournament.

== Past finals ==
=== Singles ===
Year	Champion	Runner-up	Score
2016	(Russia) Anastasia Gasanova	(Russia) Yana Sizikova	3–6, 6–2, 6–3
2017	(Serbia) Dejana Radanović	(Russia) Anna Morgina	6–3, 6–3
2018	(Belarus) Vera Lapko	(Russia) Anastasia Potapova	6–1, 6–3
2019	(Russia) Sofya Lansere	(Bosnia and Herzegovina) Dea Herdželaš	6–1, 4–6, 6–3

=== Doubles ===
Year	Champions	Runners-up	Score
2016	(Russia) Olga Doroshina (Russia) Alena Tarasova	(Russia) Polina Monova (Russia) Yana Sizikova	6–2, 6–4
2017	(Russia) Olesya Pervushina (Russia) Anastasia Potapova	(Russia) Ekaterina Kazionova (Russia) Daria Kruzhkova	6–0, 6–1
2018	(Russia) Olga Doroshina (Russia) Anastasiya Komardina	(Russia) Veronika Pepelyaeva (Russia) Anastasia Tikhonova	6–1, 6–2
2019	(United Kingdom) Freya Christie (Russia) Ekaterina Yashina	(Russia) Anastasia Frolova (Russia) Sofya Lansere	6–3, 6–3
