= Veronika Pepelyaeva =

Russian tennis player

Veronika Pepelyaeva Вероника Пепеляева
- Full name: Veronika Pavlovna Pepelyaeva
- Country (sports): Russia
- Born: 3 August 2001 (age 23)
- Plays: Right (two-handed backhand)
- Prize money: $8,253

Singles
- Career record: 31–22
- Highest ranking: No. 1008 (30 December 2019)

Doubles
- Career record: 27–17
- Career titles: 2 ITF
- Highest ranking: No. 483 (31 December 2018)

Veronika Pavlovna Pepelyaeva (Russian: Вероника Павловна Пепеляева; born 3 August 2001) is a Russian former tennis player.

Pepelyaeva has a career-high WTA doubles ranking of 483, achieved on 31 December 2018. She won two doubles titles at tournaments of the ITF Women's Circuit.

Pepelyaeva made her WTA Tour debut at the 2019 Baltic Open, after receiving a wildcard for the doubles main draw, partnered with Anastasia Tikhonova.

== ITF Circuit finals ==
=== Doubles (2–2) ===
Legend
$100,000 tournaments
$15,000 tournaments

Result	No.	Date	Tournament	Surface	Partner	Opponents	Score
Loss	1.	May 2018	Khimki Cup, Russia	Hard (i)	(Russia) Anastasia Tikhonova	(Russia) Olga Doroshina (Russia) Anastasiya Komardina	1–6, 2–6
Loss	2.	Nov 2018	ITF Antalya, Turkey	Hard	(Russia) Anastasia Tikhonova	(Hungary) Ágnes Bukta (Bulgaria) Dia Evtimova	3–6, 6–3, [9–11]
Win	3.	Sep 2019	ITF Shymkent, Kazakhstan	Clay	(Russia) Mariia Tkacheva	(Russia) Elina Avanesyan (Belarus) Viktoryia Kanapatskaya	6–4, 6–4
Win	4.	Oct 2020	ITF Sharm El Sheikh, Egypt	Hard	(Russia) Anastasia Tikhonova	(Canada) Bianca Fernandez (Canada) Leylah Fernandez	4–6, 6–3, [10–6]
