= Anastasiya Komardina =

Russian tennis player (born 1997)

Anastasiya Komardina Анастасия Комардина
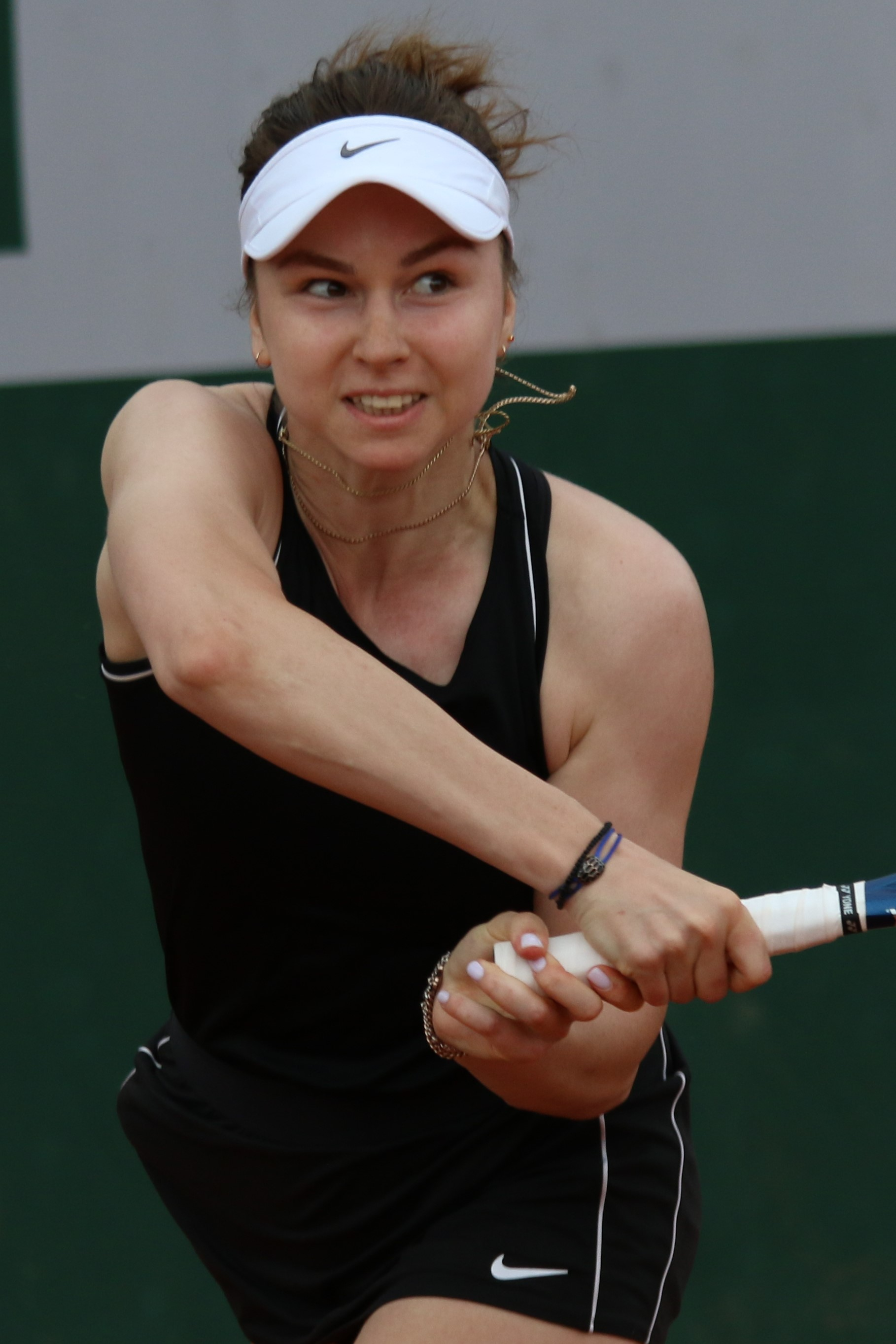
- Komardina at the 2022 French Open
- Country (sports): Russia
- Born: 8 July 1997 (age 29) Moscow
- Plays: Left (two-handed backhand)
- Prize money: US$ 257,702

Singles
- Career record: 229–131
- Career titles: 12 ITF
- Highest ranking: No. 172 (10 April 2017)

Grand Slam singles results
- Australian Open: Q3 (2017)
- French Open: Q1 (2017, 2020, 2022)
- Wimbledon: Q1 (2017)
- US Open: Q1 (2022)

Doubles
- Career record: 152–65
- Career titles: 22 ITF
- Highest ranking: No. 89 (11 June 2018)
Medal record
Representing Russia
Youth Olympic Games
Silver medal – second place	2014 Nanjing	Girls' doubles

Anastasiya Andreyevna Komardina (Russian: Анастасия Андреевна Комардина; born 8 July 1997) is an inactive Russian tennis player.

Komardina has reached a career-high junior ranking of No. 15 in July 2014.

On 10 April 2017, she achieved her best singles ranking of world No. 172. On 11 June 2018, she peaked at No. 89 in the doubles rankings. In her career, she won 12 titles in singles and 22 in doubles on the ITF Women's Circuit.

Komardina made her main-draw debut on the WTA Tour at the 2015 Hong Kong Tennis Open, where she received entry as lucky loser.

She had her major debut at the 2017 Australian Open, at the qualifying stage.

== Grand Slam singles performance timeline ==
Key
W	F	SF	QF	#R	RR	Q#	DNQ	A	NH

(W) winner; (F) finalist; (SF) semifinalist; (QF) quarterfinalist; (#R) rounds 4, 3, 2, 1; (RR) round-robin stage; (Q#) qualification round; (DNQ) did not qualify; (A) absent; (NH) not held; (SR) strike rate (events won / competed); (W–L) win–loss record.
To avoid confusion and double counting, these charts are updated at the conclusion of a tournament or when the player's participation has ended.

Tournament	2015	2016	2017	2018	2019	2020	2021	2022	W–L
Australian Open	A	A	Q3	A	A	A	Q1	A	0–0
French Open	A	A	Q1	A	A	Q1	A	Q1	0–0
Wimbledon	A	A	Q1	A	A	NH	A	A	0–0
US Open	A	A	A	A	A	A	A	Q1	0–0
Win–loss	0–0	0–0	0–0	0–0	0–0	0–0	0–0	0–0	0–0
Career statistics
Year-end ranking	207	204	337	591	238	215	322	N/A	$257,702

== ITF Circuit finals ==
=== Singles: 18 (12 titles, 6 runner-ups) ===
Legend $60,000 tournaments $25,000 tournaments $15,000 tournaments $10,000 tournaments	Finals by surface Hard (5–4) Clay (7–1) Grass (0–1)

Result	W–L	Date	Tournament	Tier	Surface	Opponent	Score
Win	1–0	Aug 2013	ITF Arad, Romania	10,000	Clay	(North Macedonia) Lina Gjorcheska	6–3, 6–2
Loss	1–1	Dec 2014	ITF Lucknow, India	15,000	Grass	(Georgia (country)) Sofia Shapatava	3–6, 2–6
Loss	1–2	Mar 2015	ITF Heraklion, Greece	10,000	Hard	(Greece) Maria Sakkari	4–6, 3–6
Win	2–2	May 2015	ITF Bol, Croatia	10,000	Clay	(North Macedonia) Lina Gjorcheska	6–3, 6–3
Win	3–2	May 2015	ITF Bol, Croatia	10,000	Clay	(North Macedonia) Lina Gjorcheska	6–3, 1–6, 6–3
Loss	3–3	Jun 2015	ITF Namangan, Uzbekistan	25,000	Hard	(Uzbekistan) Nigina Abduraimova	6–7^{(3)}, 2–6
Win	4–3	Jun 2015	Fergana Challenger, Uzbekistan	25,000	Hard	(Uzbekistan) Sabina Sharipova	6–2, 1–6, 6–4
Loss	4–4	Mar 2016	ITF Sharm El Sheikh, Egypt	10,000	Hard	(Germany) Anna Zaja	4–6, 5–7
Loss	4–5	Mar 2016	ITF Sharm El Sheikh, Egypt	10,000	Hard	(Czech Republic) Karolína Muchová	0–6, 2–6
Win	5–5	Jun 2016	ITF Moscow, Russia	25,000	Clay	(Kazakhstan) Galina Voskoboeva	7–6^{(3)}, 4–6, 6–3
Win	6–5	Aug 2016	ITF Moscow, Russia	10,000	Clay	(Russia) Viktoria Kamenskaya	6–4, 6–2
Win	7–5	Sep 2016	ITF Bucha, Ukraine	25,000	Clay	(Israel) Deniz Khazaniuk	6–4, 6–3
Win	8–5	Aug 2018	ITF Moscow, Russia	15,000	Clay	(Russia) Vlada Koval	6–4, 6–1
Win	9–5	Jan 2019	ITF Monastir, Tunisia	15,000	Hard	(Italy) Angelica Moratelli	6–4, 6–1
Win	10–5	Jan 2019	ITF Monastir, Tunisia	15,000	Hard	(Switzerland) Fiona Ganz	6–1, 6–0
Win	11–5	Apr 2019	ITF Calvi, France	25,000+H	Hard	(France) Audrey Albie	6–3, 6–2
Loss	11–6	Aug 2019	WSG Open Warsaw, Poland	60,000	Clay	(Poland) Maja Chwalińska	3–6, 0–6
Win	12–6	Jan 2020	ITF Hong Kong	25,000	Hard	(China) Xun Fangying	3–6, 6–4, 6–2

=== Doubles: 29 (22 titles, 7 runner-ups) ===
Legend $100,000 tournaments $80,000 tournaments $60,000 tournaments $25,000 tournaments $10,000 tournaments	Finals by surface Hard (10–2) Clay (12–5)

Result	W–L	Date	Tournament	Tier	Surface	Partnering	Opponents	Score
Loss	0–1	Jul 2013	ITF Savitaipale, Finland	10,000	Clay	(Lithuania) Akvilė Paražinskaitė	(Finland) Emma Laine (Finland) Piia Suomalainen	4–6, 4–6
Win	1–1	Jun 2014	ITF Amarante, Portugal	10,000	Hard	(Ukraine) Valeriya Strakhova	(Austria) Barbara Haas (Poland) Natalia Siedliska	3–6, 7–5, [10–6]
Win	2–1	Mar 2015	ITF Heraklion, Greece	10,000	Hard	(Greece) Valentini Grammatikopoulou	(Slovakia) Viktória Kužmová (Czech Republic) Petra Rohanová	7–5, 6–2
Win	3–1	Mar 2015	ITF Heraklion, Greece	10,000	Hard	(Greece) Valentini Grammatikopoulou	(Serbia) Barbara Bonić (Serbia) Tamara Čurović	6–2, 6–3
Win	4–1	Apr 2015	ITF Heraklion, Greece	10,000	Hard	(Greece) Valentini Grammatikopoulou	(Serbia) Tamara Čurović (Greece) Despina Papamichail	6–2, 6–2
Win	5–1	May 2015	ITF Bol, Croatia	10,000	Clay	(Slovakia) Zuzana Luknárová	(Slovenia) Pia Čuk (Slovenia) Tamara Zidanšek	6–2, 0–6, [10–7]
Win	6–1	Jun 2015	ITF Namangan, Uzbekistan	25,000	Hard	(Bulgaria) Julia Terziyska	(Russia) Veronika Kudermetova (Russia) Ksenia Lykina	7–6^{(2)}, 7–5
Win	7–1	Aug 2015	ITF Mamaia, Romania	25,000	Clay	(Georgia (country)) Sofia Shapatava	(Switzerland) Xenia Knoll (Switzerland) Amra Sadiković	6–3, 5–7, [10–8]
Win	8–1	Oct 2015	ITF Clermont-Ferrand, France	25,000	Hard (i)	(Serbia) Nina Stojanović	(Belgium) Elyne Boeykens (Netherlands) Eva Wacanno	6–2, 6–1
Win	9–1	Feb 2016	ITF Moscow, Russia	25,000	Hard (i)	(Serbia) Nina Stojanović	(Russia) Polina Monova (Russia) Yana Sizikova	6–7^{(5)}, 6–1, [12–10]
Loss	9–2	Mar 2016	ITF Sharm El Sheikh, Egypt	10,000	Hard	(Russia) Anna Morgina	(Ukraine) Alona Fomina (Russia) Ekaterina Yashina	1–6, 6–4, [8–10]
Loss	9–3	Mar 2016	ITF Sharm El Sheikh, Egypt	10,000	Hard	(Russia) Anna Morgina	(Ukraine) Alona Fomina (Russia) Ekaterina Yashina	6–7^{(2)}, 6–3, [8–10]
Win	10–3	Mar 2016	ITF Sharm El Sheikh, Egypt	10,000	Hard	(Russia) Yana Sizikova	(Ukraine) Veronika Kapshay (Switzerland) Karin Kennel	3–6, 6–3, [10–6]
Win	11–3	Aug 2016	ITF Kharkiv, Ukraine	25,000	Clay	(Russia) Valentyna Ivakhnenko	(Turkey) Başak Eraydın (Belarus) Ilona Kremen	6–1, 6–3
Win	12–3	Sep 2016	ITF Almaty, Kazakhstan	25,000	Clay	(Russia) Valentyna Ivakhnenko	(Russia) Polina Monova (Russia) Valeria Savinykh	7–5, 6–4
Win	13–3	Sep 2016	ITF Bucha, Ukraine	25,000	Clay	(Russia) Valentyna Ivakhnenko	(Romania) Mihaela Buzărnescu (Moldova) Alexandra Perper	6–3, 6–1
Win	14–3	Jul 2017	Internazionale di Roma, Italy	60,000	Clay	(Argentina) Nadia Podoroska	(Netherlands) Quirine Lemoine (Netherlands) Eva Wacanno	7–6^{(3)}, 6–3
Win	15–3	Jul 2017	Contrexéville Open, France	100,000	Clay	(Bulgaria) Elitsa Kostova	(France) Manon Arcangioli (France) Sara Cakarevic	6–3, 6–4
Loss	15–4	Aug 2017	ITF Braunschweig, Germany	25,000	Clay	(Latvia) Diāna Marcinkēviča	(Sweden) Cornelia Lister (Spain) María Teresa Torró Flor	6–3, 6–7^{(5)}, [9–11]
Win	16–4	Sep 2017	ITF Mamaia, Romania	25,000	Clay	(Romania) Elena-Gabriela Ruse	(Bosnia and Herzegovina) Dea Herdželaš (Romania) Oana Georgeta Simion	3–6, 6–1, [10–6]
Win	17–4	Sep 2017	Sofia Cup, Bulgaria	25,000	Clay	(Romania) Jaqueline Cristian	(Greece) Valentini Grammatikopoulou (Romania) Elena-Gabriela Ruse	6–3, 6–0
Win	18–4	Nov 2017	Waco Showdown, United States	80,000	Hard	(United States) Sofia Kenin	(United States) Jessica Pegula (United States) Taylor Townsend	7–5, 5–7, [11–9]
Win	19–4	May 2018	Khimki Cup, Russia	100,000	Hard (i)	(Russia) Olga Doroshina	(Russia) Veronika Pepelyaeva (Russia) Anastasia Tikhonova	6–1, 6–2
Loss	19–5	Oct 2018	ITF Seville, Spain	25,000	Clay	(Turkey) Başak Eraydın	(Venezuela) Andrea Gamiz (Argentina) Paula Ormaechea	5–7, 6–7^{(5)}
Win	20–5	May 2019	Bredeney Ladies Open, Germany	25,000	Clay	(North Macedonia) Lina Gjorcheska	(Russia) Alena Fomina (Czech Republic) Anastasia Zarycká	6–3, 6–3
Win	21–5	Jun 2019	ITF Minsk, Belarus	25,000	Clay	(North Macedonia) Lina Gjorcheska	(Belarus) Ilona Kremen (Belarus) Iryna Shymanovich	6–7^{(4)}, 6–4, [10–8]
Loss	21–6	Jun 2019	ITF Ystad, Sweden	25,000	Clay	(North Macedonia) Lina Gjorcheska	(United Kingdom) Emily Arbuthnott (Kazakhstan) Anna Danilina	6–3, 2–6, [4–10]
Win	22–6	Jul 2019	ITF Getxo, Spain	25,000	Clay (i)	(North Macedonia) Lina Gjorcheska	(Hungary) Vanda Lukács (Switzerland) Nina Stadler	6–3, 7–6^{(4)}
Loss	22–7	Sep 2019	ITF Prague, Czech Republic	25,000	Clay	(Russia) Ekaterina Kazionova	(Czech Republic) Anastasia Dețiuc (Czech Republic) Johana Marková	1–6, 3–6
