= Vera Lapko =

Belarusian tennis player

Vera Lapko Вера Лапко
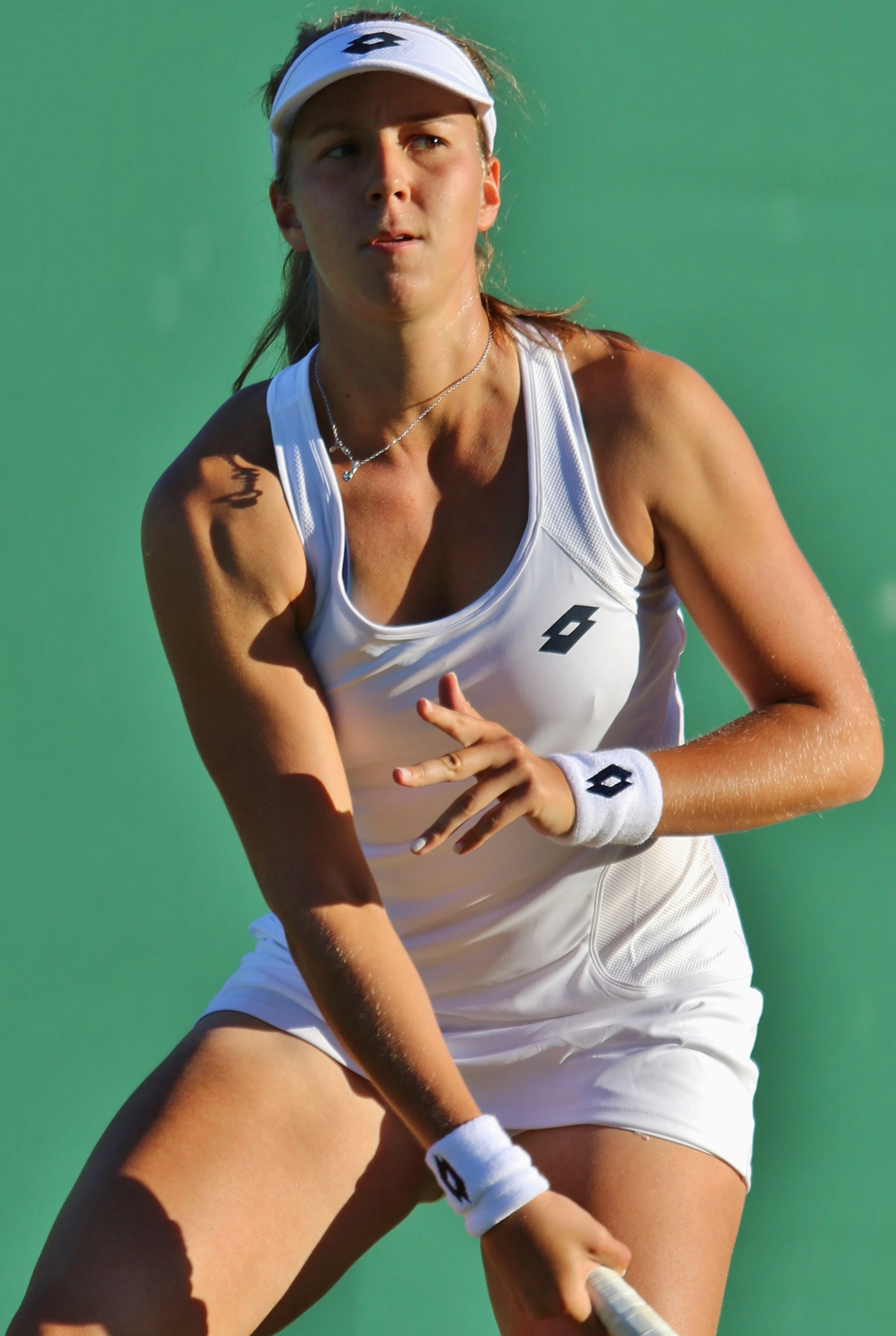
- Vera Lapko at the 2018 Wimbledon Championships
- Full name: Vera Valeryevna Lapko
- Country (sports): Belarus
- Residence: Minsk, Belarus
- Born: 29 September 1998 (age 28) Minsk
- Height: 1.84 m (6 ft 0 in)
- Turned pro: 2014
- Retired: 2024
- Plays: Right (two-handed backhand)
- Coach: Vladimir Kruk
- Prize money: $877,415

Singles
- Career record: 199–110
- Career titles: 7 ITF
- Highest ranking: No. 60 (1 October 2018)

Grand Slam singles results
- Australian Open: 1R (2019)
- French Open: 1R (2019)
- Wimbledon: 2R (2018)
- US Open: 2R (2018, 2020)

Doubles
- Career record: 97–56
- Career titles: 7 ITF
- Highest ranking: No. 83 (14 May 2018)

Grand Slam doubles results
- Australian Open: 2R (2021)
- French Open: 1R (2018, 2020)
- Wimbledon: 1R (2018)

Team competitions
- Fed Cup: 6–2

Vera Valeryevna Lapko (Belarusian: Вера Валер'еўна Лапко; born 29 September 1998) is a Belarusian former professional tennis player. She has a career high WTA singles ranking of world No. 60, which she achieved on 1 October 2018. She also achieved a career high WTA doubles ranking of No. 83 on 14 May 2018.

She won seven singles and seven doubles titles on the ITF Women's Circuit.

== Career ==
Lapko reached the 2014 US Open and 2015 Wimbledon girls' doubles finals, both times partnering Tereza Mihalíková. She won the 2016 Australian Open girls' singles title, defeating Mihalíková in the final.

Playing for Belarus Fed Cup team, Lapko had a win–loss record of 6–2.

In January 2024, she announced her retirement from tennis due to knee injuries.

== Performance timeline ==
Key
W	F	SF	QF	#R	RR	Q#	DNQ	A	NH

(W) winner; (F) finalist; (SF) semifinalist; (QF) quarterfinalist; (#R) rounds 4, 3, 2, 1; (RR) round-robin stage; (Q#) qualification round; (DNQ) did not qualify; (A) absent; (NH) not held; (SR) strike rate (events won / competed); (W–L) win–loss record.
To avoid confusion and double counting, these charts are updated at the conclusion of a tournament or when the player's participation has ended.

Only main-draw results in WTA Tour, Grand Slam tournaments, Fed Cup/Billie Jean King Cup and Olympic Games are included in win–loss records.

=== Singles ===
Current through the 2022 WTA Tour.

Tournament	2016	2017	2018	2019	2020	2021	2022	SR	W–L
Grand Slam tournaments
Australian Open	A	Q2	Q2	1R	A	A	A	0 / 1	0–1
French Open	A	A	Q1	1R	A	A	A	0 / 1	0–1
Wimbledon	A	A	2R	1R	NH	A	A	0 / 2	1–2
US Open	A	Q2	2R	A	2R	A	A	0 / 2	2–2
Win–loss	0–0	0–0	2–2	0–3	1–1	0–0	0–0	0 / 6	3–6
WTA 1000
Dubai / Qatar Open (Note: The first Premier 5 event of the year has switched back and forth between the Dubai Tennis Championships and the Qatar Ladies Open since 2009. Dubai was classified as a Premier 5 event from 2009 to 2011 before being succeeded by Doha for the 2012–2014 period. In 2015, Dubai regained its Premier 5 status while Doha was demoted to Premier status. The Premier 5 tournaments were reclassified as WTA 1000 tournaments in 2021.)	A	A	A	1R	A	A	A	0 / 1	0–1
Indian Wells Open	A	A	Q2	1R	NH	A	A	0 / 1	0–1
Miami Open	A	A	Q2	1R	NH	A	A	0 / 1	0–1
Madrid Open	A	A	A	Q1	NH	A	A	0 / 0	0–0
Canadian Open	A	A	Q1	A	NH	A	A	0 / 0	0–0
Cincinnati Open	A	A	Q2	A	A	A	A	0 / 0	0–0
Career statistics
Tournaments	1	2	10	10	2	4	0	Career total: 29	
Overall win–loss	0–1	2–2	14–11	3–10	1–2	2–4	0–0	0 / 29	22–30
Year-end ranking	320	131	65	328	293	366	291	$869,526	

== WTA Tour finals ==
=== Doubles: 4 (4 runner-ups) ===
Legend WTA 500 WTA 250 (0–4)	Finals by surface Hard (0–3) Clay (0–1)

Result	W–L	Date	Tournament	Tier	Surface	Partner	Opponents	Score
Loss	0–1	Sep 2016	Guangzhou Open, China	International (Note: The WTA International tournaments were reclassified as WTA 250 tournaments in 2021.)	Hard	(Belarus) Olga Govortsova	(United States) Asia Muhammad (China) Peng Shuai	2–6, 6–7^{(3)}
Loss	0–2	Apr 2018	Ladies Open Lugano, Switzerland	International	Clay	(Belarus) Aryna Sabalenka	(Belgium) Kirsten Flipkens (Belgium) Elise Mertens	1–6, 3–6
Loss	0–3	Sep 2018	Guangzhou Open, China	International	Hard	(Montenegro) Danka Kovinić	(Australia) Monique Adamczak (Australia) Jessica Moore	6–4, 5–7, [4–10]
Loss	0–4	Oct 2018	Luxembourg Open	International	Hard (i)	(Luxembourg) Mandy Minella	(Belgium) Greet Minnen (Belgium) Alison Van Uytvanck	6–7^{(3)}, 2–6

== ITF Circuit finals ==
=== Singles: 12 (7 titles, 5 runner-ups) ===
Legend $100,000 tournaments $60,000 tournaments $25,000 tournaments $10,000 tournaments	Finals by surface Hard (6–0) Clay (1–5)

Result	W–L	Date	Tournament	Tier	Surface	Opponent	Score
Win	1–0	Mar 2015	ITF Sharm El Sheikh, Egypt	10,000	Hard	(Czech Republic) Markéta Vondroušová	7–5, 6–3
Loss	1–1	Jun 2016	ITF Minsk, Belarus	25,000	Clay	(Russia) Anna Kalinskaya	4–6, 3–6
Win	2–1	Jul 2016	ITF Astana, Kazakhstan	10,000	Hard	(Russia) Valeria Savinykh	7–6^{(3)}, 3–6, 6–4
Loss	2–2	Jun 2017	Macha Lake Open, Czech Republic	25,000	Clay	(Slovakia) Anna Karolína Schmiedlová	4–6, 5–7
Win	3–2	Aug 2017	Landisville Tennis Challenge, United States	25,000	Hard	(Slovakia) Anna Karolína Schmiedlová	4–6, 6–4, 7–6^{(4)}
Win	4–2	Oct 2017	ITF Clermont-Ferrand, France	25,000	Hard (i)	(Netherlands) Bibiane Schoofs	6–4, 6–4
Win	5–2	May 2018	Khimki Ladies Cup, Russia	100,000	Hard (i)	(Russia) Anastasia Potapova	6–1, 6–3
Win	6–2	May 2018	Open Saint-Gaudens, France	60,000	Clay	(Netherlands) Quirine Lemoine	6–2, 6–4
Loss	6–3	Aug 2021	ITF Almaty, Kazakhstan	25,000	Clay	(Belarus) Iryna Shymanovich	3–6, 2–6
Loss	6–4	Jan 2022	ITF Vero Beach, United States	25,000	Clay	(United States) Sophie Chang	1–6, 6–1, 2–6
Loss	6–5	Aug 2022	ITF Radom, Poland	25,000	Clay	(Turkey) Çağla Büyükakçay	1–4 ret.
Win	7–5	Oct 2022	Trnava Indoor, Slovakia	25,000	Hard (i)	(Czech Republic) Lucie Havlíčková	4–6, 7–6^{(1)}, 6–2

=== Doubles: 14 (7 titles, 7 runner-ups) ===
Legend $100,000 tournaments $60,000 tournaments $25,000 tournaments $10,000 tournaments	Finals by surface Hard (5–4) Clay (2–2) Carpet (0–1)

Result	W–L	Date	Tournament	Tier	Surface	Partnering	Opponents	Score
Win	1–0	Mar 2015	ITF Sharm El Sheikh, Egypt	10,000	Hard	(Czech Republic) Markéta Vondroušová	(Russia) Anna Morgina (Norway) Caroline Rohde-Moe	6–2, 6–4
Loss	1–1	Mar 2015	ITF Sharm El Sheikh	10,000	Hard	(Belarus) Anhelina Kalita	(India) Prarthana Thombare (Russia) Ekaterina Yashina	4–6, 7–5, [6–10]
Loss	1–2	Feb 2016	ITF Mâcon, France	10,000	Hard (i)	(Denmark) Emilie Francati	(France) Manon Arcangioli (Croatia) Silvia Njirić	5–7, 6–7^{(5)}
Loss	1–3	Nov 2016	ITF Minsk, Belarus	25,000	Hard (i)	(Belarus) Ilona Kremen	(Russia) Anna Kalinskaya (Belarus) Nika Shytkouskaya	2–6, 3–6
Loss	1–4	Nov 2016	ITF Zawada, Poland	25,000	Carpet (i)	(Belarus) Ilona Kremen	(Poland) Justyna Jegiołka (Latvia) Diāna Marcinkēviča	4–6, 5–7
Win	2–4	Feb 2017	ITF Moscow, Russia	25,000	Hard (i)	(Ukraine) Dayana Yastremska	(Netherlands) Bibiane Schoofs (Russia) Ekaterina Yashina	7–5, 6–3
Win	3–4	Mar 2017	Open de Seine-et-Marne, France	60,000	Hard (i)	(Russia) Polina Monova	(France) Manon Arcangioli (Poland) Magdalena Fręch	6–3, 6–4
Loss	3–5	May 2017	ITF Lleida, Spain	25,000	Clay	(Bulgaria) Aleksandrina Naydenova	(Venezuela) Andrea Gámiz (Spain) Georgina García Pérez	1–6, 6–4, [8–10]
Win	4–5	Jun 2017	ITF Warsaw, Poland	25,000+H	Clay	(Australia) Priscilla Hon	(Poland) Katarzyna Kawa (Poland) Katarzyna Piter	7–6^{(3)}, 6–4
Win	5–5	Jul 2017	Bella Cup, Poland	25,000+H	Clay	(Russia) Anna Morgina	(Czech Republic) Miriam Kolodziejová (Czech Republic) Jesika Malečková	6–2, 6–3
Loss	5–6	Jul 2017	Sacramento Challenger, United States	60,000	Hard	(Serbia) Jovana Jakšić	(United States) Desirae Krawczyk (Mexico) Giuliana Olmos	1–6, 2–6
Win	6–6	Aug 2017	Lexington Challenger, United States	60,000	Hard	(Australia) Priscilla Hon	(Japan) Hiroko Kuwata (Russia) Valeria Savinykh	6–3, 6–4
Win	7–6	Sep 2017	ITF Clermont-Ferrand, France	25,000	Hard (i)	(Sweden) Cornelia Lister	(United Kingdom) Sarah Beth Grey (United Kingdom) Olivia Nicholls	6–4, 6–3
Loss	7–7	May 2018	Open de Cagnes-sur-Mer, France	100,000	Clay	(Kazakhstan) Galina Voskoboeva	(United States) Kaitlyn Christian (United States) Sabrina Santamaria	6–2, 5–7, [7–10]

== Junior Grand Slam tournament finals ==
=== Girls' singles: 1 (title) ===
Result	Year	Tournament	Surface	Opponent	Score
Win	2016	Australian Open	Hard	(Slovakia) Tereza Mihalíková	6–3, 6–4

=== Girls' doubles: 2 (runner-ups) ===
Result	Year	Tournament	Surface	Partner	Opponents	Score
Loss	2014	US Open	Hard	(Slovakia) Tereza Mihalíková	(Turkey) İpek Soylu (Switzerland) Jil Teichmann	7–5, 2–6, [7–10]
Loss	2015	Wimbledon	Grass	(Slovakia) Tereza Mihalíková	(Hungary) Dalma Gálfi (Hungary) Fanny Stollár	3–6, 2–6
