= 2015 Powiat Poznański Open =

- Date: 27 July–2 August
- Edition: 2nd
- Category: ITF Women's Circuit
- Prize money: $75,000
- Surface: Clay
- Location: Sobota, Poland

Champions

Singles
- (Czech Republic) Petra Cetkovská

Doubles
- (Netherlands) Kiki Bertens / (Netherlands) Richèl Hogenkamp
| ← 2014 · | Powiat Poznański Open |

The 2015 Powiat Poznański Open was a professional tennis tournament played on outdoor clay courts. It was the second edition of the tournament and part of the 2015 ITF Women's Circuit, offering a total of $75,000 in prize money. It took place in Sobota, Poland, on 27 July–2 August 2015.

== Singles main draw entrants ==
=== Seeds ===
| Country | Player | Rank^{1} | Seed |
|---|---|---|---|
| BUL | Sesil Karatantcheva | 96 | 1 |
| NED | Kiki Bertens | 114 | 2 |
| NED | Richèl Hogenkamp | 121 | 3 |
| LAT | Jeļena Ostapenko | 131 | 4 |
| SVK | Kristína Kučová | 135 | 5 |
| TUN | Ons Jabeur | 138 | 6 |
| SUI | Romina Oprandi | 141 | 7 |
| CZE | Barbora Krejčíková | 145 | 8 |

- ^{1} Rankings as of 20 July 2015

=== Other entrants ===
The following players received wildcards into the singles main draw:

- (Poland) Magdalena Fręch
- (Germany) Natalia Siedliska
- (United States) Natalie Suk
- (Czech Republic) Nicole Vaidišová

The following players received entry from the qualifying draw:

- (Russia) Ekaterina Alexandrova
- (Czech Republic) Martina Borecká
- (Romania) Cristina Dinu
- (France) Chloé Paquet

== Champions ==
=== Singles ===
- (Czech Republic) Petra Cetkovská def. (Latvia) Jeļena Ostapenko, 3–6, 7–5, 6–2

=== Doubles ===
- (Netherlands) Kiki Bertens / (Netherlands) Richèl Hogenkamp def. (Sweden) Cornelia Lister / (Latvia) Jeļena Ostapenko, 7–6^{(7–2)}, 6–4
