= 2014 Powiat Poznański Open =

- Date: 21–27 July
- Edition: 1st
- Category: ITF Women's Circuit
- Prize money: $50,000
- Surface: Clay
- Location: Sobota, Greater Poland Voivodeship, Poland

Champions

Singles
- (Slovakia) Kristína Kučová

Doubles
- (Czech Republic) Barbora Krejčíková / (Serbia) Aleksandra Krunić
Powiat Poznański Open	· 2015 →

The 2014 Powiat Poznański Open was a professional tennis tournament played on outdoor clay courts. It was the first edition of the tournament which was part of the 2014 ITF Women's Circuit, offering a total of $50,000 in prize money. It took place in Sobota, Greater Poland Voivodeship, Poland, on 21–27 July 2014.

== Singles main draw entrants ==
=== Seeds ===
Country	Player	Rank^{1}	Seed
CZE	Andrea Hlaváčková	122	1
SVK	Kristína Kučová	129	2
GER	Dinah Pfizenmaier	134	3
NED	Arantxa Rus	140	4
UKR	Maryna Zanevska	142	5
SRB	Aleksandra Krunić	144	6
UKR	Anastasiya Vasylyeva	145	7
NED	Richèl Hogenkamp	152	8

- ^{1} Rankings as of 14 July 2014

=== Other entrants ===
The following players received wildcards into the singles main draw:

- (Poland) Magdalena Fręch
- (Poland) Katarzyna Kawa
- (Poland) Daria Kuczer
- (United States) Natalie Suk

The following players received entry from the qualifying draw:

- (Russia) Natela Dzalamidze
- (Italy) Anastasia Grymalska
- (Czech Republic) Pernilla Mendesová
- (Russia) Valeria Savinykh

The following players received entry into the singles main draw as lucky losers:

- (Spain) Inés Ferrer Suárez
- (Lithuania) Lina Stančiūtė

The following players received entry by a Special Exempt:

- (Czech Republic) Barbora Krejčíková
- (Switzerland) Lara Michel

== Champions ==
=== Singles ===
- (Slovakia) Kristína Kučová def. (Kazakhstan) Sesil Karatantcheva 1–6, 7–5, 6–3

=== Doubles ===
- (Czech Republic) Barbora Krejčíková / (Serbia) Aleksandra Krunić def. (Ukraine) Anastasiya Vasylyeva / (Ukraine) Maryna Zanevska 3–6, 6–0, [10–6]
