= 2008 Salwator Cup – Singles =

Singles
- 2008 Salwator Cup

Final
- Champion: (United Kingdom) Anne Keothavong
- Runner-up: (Romania) Monica Niculescu
- Score: 7–6^{(4)},4–6. 6–3

Events
Singles	Doubles
Salwator Cup	· 2014 →

This was the first edition of the tournament.

== Seeds ==
1. (Russia) Alisa Kleybanova (first round)
2. (Thailand) Tamarine Tanasugarn (second round)
3. (Romania) Monica Niculescu (final)
4. (Czech Republic) Petra Kvitová (withdrew)
5. (Chinese Taipei) Chan Yung-Jan (second round)
6. (United Kingdom) Anne Keothavong (champion)
7. (Czech Republic) Barbora Záhlavová-Strýcová (Quarterfinal)
8. (Russia) Elena Vesnina (second round)

== Draw ==
=== Key ===
- Q = Qualifier
- WC = Wild card
- LL = Lucky loser
- Alt = Alternate
- SE = Special exempt
- PR = Protected ranking
- ITF = ITF entry
- JE = Junior exempt
- w/o = Walkover
- r = Retired
- d = Defaulted
- SR = Special ranking

=== Finals ===
Semifinals
WC	(Germany) Angelique Kerber	4	6	5
3	(Romania) Monica Niculescu	6	2	7
6	(United Kingdom) Anne Keothavong	6	6
(Italy) Maria Elena Camerin	3	0

Final
3	(Romania) Monica Niculescu	6(4)	6	3
6	(United Kingdom) Anne Keothavong	7	4	6

=== Top half ===
First round
1	(Russia) A Kleybanova	3	6	5
WC	(Germany) A Kerber	6	4	7
SE	(Switzerland) S Voegele	6	6
(Belarus) E Dzehalevich	4	2
WC	(Poland) K Piter	4	2
(Russia) A Lapushchenkova	6	6
Q	(Ukraine) V Kutuzova	1	r
7	(Czech Republic) B Záhlavová-Strýcová	6
3	(Romania) M Niculescu	6	6
(Colombia) M Duque-Marino	2	2
Q	(Lithuania) L Stančiūtė	6	4	6
(Greece) E Daniilidou	4	6	0
(Czech Republic) L Hradecká	3	6	2
(Kazakhstan) Y Shvedova	6	4	6
LL	(Bulgaria) H Velieva	2	2
5	(Chinese Taipei) Y-J Chan	6	6

Second round
WC	(Germany) A Kerber	6	6
SE	(Switzerland) S Voegele	1	2
(Russia) A Lapushchenkova	2	2
7	(Czech Republic) B Záhlavová-Strýcová	6	6
3	(Romania) M Niculescu	6	6
Q	(Lithuania) L Stančiūtė	3	4
(Kazakhstan) Y Shvedova	6	6
5	(Chinese Taipei) Y-J Chan	2	2

Quarterfinals
WC	(Germany) A Kerber	6	6
7	(Czech Republic) B Záhlavová-Strýcová	0	1
3	(Romania) M Niculescu	6	7
(Kazakhstan) Y Shvedova	3	5

Semifinals
WC	(Germany) A Kerber	4	6	5
3	(Romania) M Niculescu	6	2	7

=== Bottom half ===
First round
6	(United Kingdom) A Keothavong	6	6
SE	(Russia) V Manasieva	4	2
(Estonia) M Ani	3	2
(Russia) E Rodina	6	6
(Germany) J Schruff	2	7	6
(Czech Republic) R Voráčová	6	6(3)	3
LL	(Estonia) M Rüütel	6	6
Q	(Ukraine) V Kapshay	2	4
(Russia) E Bychkova	3	6(10)
8	(Russia) E Vesnina	6	7
(Poland) U Radwańska	6(5)	6	7
Q	(Bosnia and Herzegovina) M Jugić-Salkić	7	4	5
(Italy) ME Camerin	6	6
WC	(Poland) A Korzeniak	2	0
WC	(Poland) O Brózda	3	2
2	(Thailand) T Tanasugarn	6	6

Second round
6	(United Kingdom) A Keothavong	6	6
(Russia) E Rodina	4	2
(Germany) J Schruff	2	3
LL	(Estonia) M Rüütel	6	6
8	(Russia) E Vesnina	6(5)	4
(Poland) U Radwańska	7	6
(Italy) ME Camerin
2	(Thailand) T Tanasugarn	w/	o

Quarterfinals
6	(United Kingdom) A Keothavong	6	6
LL	(Estonia) M Rüütel	1	3
(Poland) U Radwańska	4	6	1
(Italy) ME Camerin	6	4	6

Semifinals
6	(United Kingdom) A Keothavong	6	6
(Italy) ME Camerin	3	0

== Sources ==
- Main Draw
