= 2015 Powiat Poznański Open – Singles =

Singles
- 2015 Powiat Poznański Open

Final
- Champion: (Czech Republic) Petra Cetkovská
- Runner-up: (Latvia) Jeļena Ostapenko
- Score: 3–6, 7–5, 6–2

Events
Singles	Doubles
← 2014 ·	Powiat Poznański Open

Kristína Kučová was the defending champion, but lost to Stephanie Vogt in the first round.

Petra Cetkovská won the title by defeating Jeļena Ostapenko in the final, 3–6, 7–5, 6–2.

== Seeds ==
1. (Bulgaria) Sesil Karatantcheva (second round)
2. (Netherlands) Kiki Bertens (semifinals)
3. (Netherlands) Richèl Hogenkamp (quarterfinals)
4. (Latvia) Jeļena Ostapenko (final)
5. (Slovakia) Kristína Kučová (first round)
6. (Tunisia) Ons Jabeur (quarterfinals)
7. (Switzerland) Romina Oprandi (second round)
8. (Czech Republic) Barbora Krejčíková (quarterfinals)

== Main draw ==
=== Key ===
- Q = Qualifier
- WC = Wild card
- LL = Lucky loser
- Alt = Alternate
- SE = Special exempt
- PR = Protected ranking
- ITF = ITF entry
- JE = Junior exempt
- w/o = Walkover
- r = Retired
- d = Defaulted
- SR = Special ranking

=== Finals ===
Semifinals
Q	(Czech Republic) Martina Borecká	6	6^{6}	2
(Czech Republic) Petra Cetkovská	3	7^{8}	6
4	(Latvia) Jeļena Ostapenko	6	2	6
2	(Netherlands) Kiki Bertens	3	6	3

Final
(Czech Republic) Petra Cetkovská	3	7	6
4	(Latvia) Jeļena Ostapenko	6	5	2

=== Top half ===
First round
1	(Bulgaria) S Karatantcheva	6	7
(Poland) K Piter	2	5
Q	(Czech Republic) M Borecká	4	7	6
(Turkey) P Özgen	6	5	2
WC	(Czech Republic) N Vaidišová	6^{2}	6	7
Q	(Romania) C Dinu	7^{7}	3	5
(Liechtenstein) S Vogt	6	2	6
5	(Slovakia) K Kučová	4	6	1
3	(Netherlands) R Hogenkamp	7^{7}	6
(Germany) A Schäfer	6^{3}	2
(Romania) S Cîrstea	6	7
WC	(Germany) N Siedliska	1	5
(Czech Republic) P Cetkovská	6	2	6
(Georgia (country)) S Shapatava	4	6	4
WC	(Poland) M Fręch	7^{8}	2	6^{4}
7	(Switzerland) R Oprandi	6^{6}	6	7^{7}

Second round
1	(Bulgaria) S Karatantcheva	0	6	6^{2}
Q	(Czech Republic) M Borecká	6	2	7^{7}
WC	(Czech Republic) N Vaidišová	6	0	6
(Liechtenstein) S Vogt	4	6	3
3	(Netherlands) R Hogenkamp	7^{7}	7
(Romania) S Cîrstea	6^{4}	5
(Czech Republic) P Cetkovská	6	7^{9}
7	(Switzerland) R Oprandi	3	6^{7}

Quarterfinals
Q	(Czech Republic) M Borecká	1	7^{7}	6
WC	(Czech Republic) N Vaidišová	6	6^{1}	1
3	(Netherlands) R Hogenkamp	4	6	2
(Czech Republic) P Cetkovská	6	1	6

Semifinals
Q	(Czech Republic) M Borecká	6	6^{6}	2
(Czech Republic) P Cetkovská	3	7^{8}	6

=== Bottom half ===
First round
6	(Tunisia) O Jabeur	6	2	6
(Argentina) F Molinero	1	6	1
(Greece) M Sakkari	6	6
Q	(Russia) E Alexandrova	1	3
(Italy) A Brianti	1	6	3
(Croatia) T Mrdeža	6	4	6
WC	(United States) N Suk	2	1
4	(Latvia) J Ostapenko	6	6
8	(Czech Republic) B Krejčíková	6	6
(Croatia) A Vrljić	1	1
(Uzbekistan) A Amanmuradova	2	2
(United States) K Stewart	6	6
Q	(France) C Paquet	2	6	3
(Hungary) R-L Jani	6	2	6
(Belgium) Y Bonaventure	6	1	2
2	(Netherlands) K Bertens	3	6	6

Second round
6	(Tunisia) O Jabeur	7	6
(Greece) M Sakkari	5	1
(Croatia) T Mrdeža	6	3	4
4	(Latvia) J Ostapenko	3	6	6
8	(Czech Republic) B Krejčíková	7^{7}	6
(United States) K Stewart	6^{4}	2
(Hungary) R-L Jani	5	6^{1}
2	(Netherlands) K Bertens	7	7^{7}

Quarterfinals
6	(Tunisia) O Jabeur	3	4
4	(Latvia) J Ostapenko	6	6
8	(Czech Republic) B Krejčíková	6	1	1
2	(Netherlands) K Bertens	3	6	6

Semifinals
4	(Latvia) J Ostapenko	6	2	6
2	(Netherlands) K Bertens	3	6	3
