= Petra Cetkovská =

Czech tennis player (born 1985)

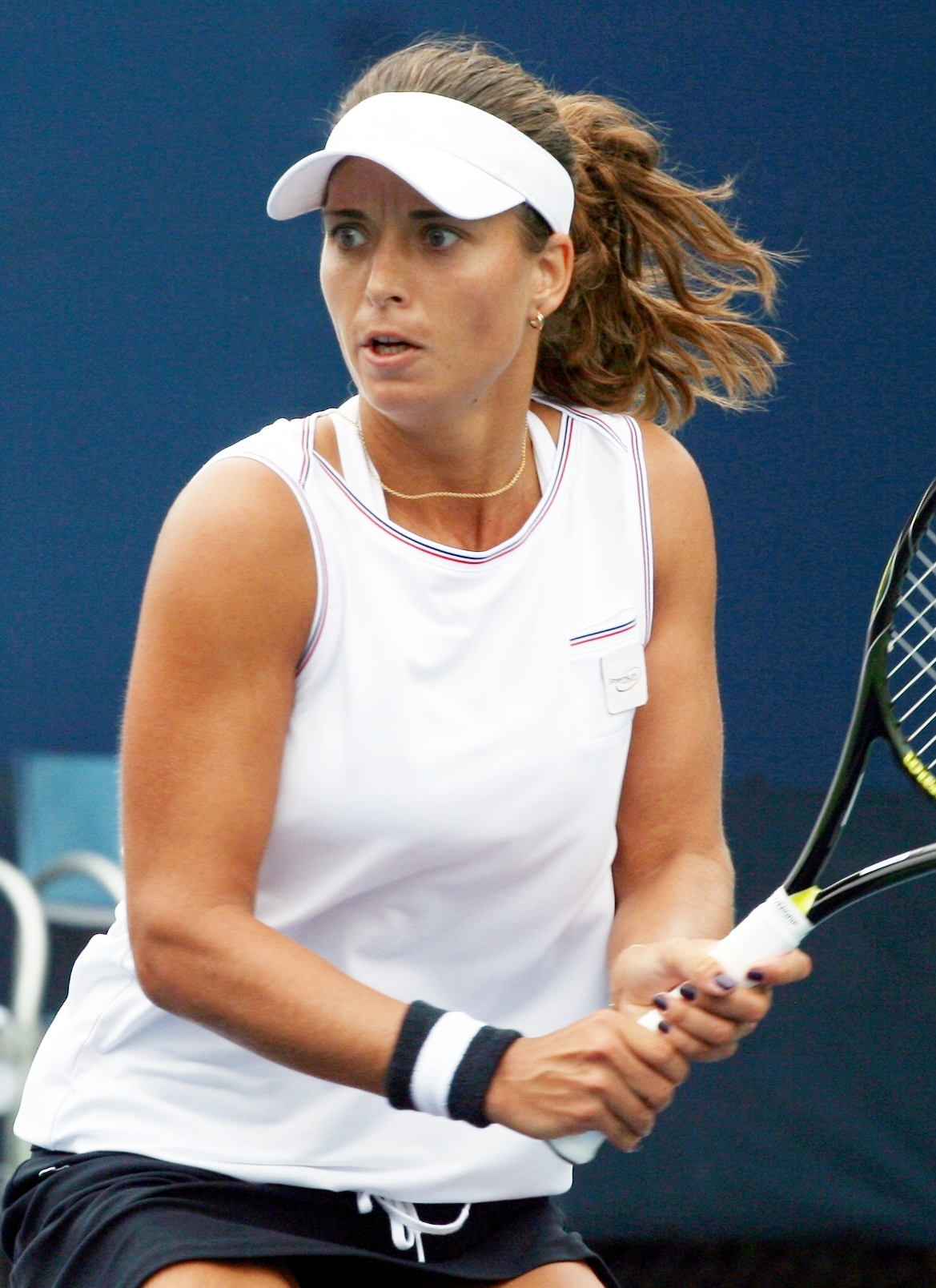
- Cetkovská in 2013
- Country (sports): Czech Republic
- Residence: Paris, France
- Born: 8 February 1985 (age 41) Prostějov, Czechoslovakia (now Czech Republic)
- Height: 1.72 m (5 ft 8 in)
- Turned pro: 2000
- Retired: 2020
- Plays: Right-handed (two-handed backhand)
- Prize money: US$ 2,056,672

Singles
- Career record: 423–227
- Career titles: 0 WTA, 23 ITF
- Highest ranking: No. 25 (18 June 2012)

Grand Slam singles results
- Australian Open: 2R (2012)
- French Open: 4R (2008)
- Wimbledon: 4R (2011)
- US Open: 3R (2015)

Doubles
- Career record: 194–107
- Career titles: 2 WTA, 25 ITF
- Highest ranking: No. 91 (13 June 2011)

Grand Slam doubles results
- Australian Open: 2R (2012)
- French Open: 1R (2007, 2008, 2009, 2012, 2014, 2015)
- Wimbledon: 1R (2007, 2008, 2012, 2014)
- US Open: 2R (2013, 2014)

Petra Cetkovská (Czech pronunciation: [ˈpɛtra ˈtsɛtkofskaː]; born 8 February 1985) is a Czech retired tennis player. Having turned professional in 2000, she reached a career-high singles ranking of world No. 25, on 18 June 2012. Over her career, Cetkovská defeated top-ten players Marion Bartoli, Elena Dementieva, Angelique Kerber, Li Na, Agnieszka Radwańska, Caroline Wozniacki, and Vera Zvonareva.

== Personal life ==
Cetkovská has been playing tennis since she was five. Her father Petr works at a pro shop in a local tennis club, while her mother Alena is a nurse. She has one younger brother, Matěj. Petra's father is of Macedonian origin.

When she was 14, Cetkovská was involved in an incident with a friend while playing sport when her friend had accidentally pushed her against a wall. Two years later, she had brain surgery due to the swelling caused by the incident. A year later, she had contracted glandular fever, further hampering her tennis career prospects and the third obstacle had come when she broke her foot playing the junior doubles final at the Australian Open.

Cetkovská speaks fluent French and English. She was involved in a relationship with ATP player Marcos Baghdatis when she was 19.

== Career ==
=== 2000–2006: mainly on ITF tournaments ===
In 2000, Cetkovská played the first events on the ITF Circuit, winning one doubles title. The following year, she won two singles titles and one doubles title. In 2002, when she competed in her first WTA Tour qualifying at Palermo, Cetkovská won two singles and two doubles titles on the ITF Circuit.

She won another singles title in 2003, and three ITF doubles titles in 2004. The following year, Cetkovská fell in WTA qualifying twice; but she won six singles titles and three doubles titles on the ITF Circuit. In 2006, she lost in Grand Slam qualifyings three times, at Roland Garros, Wimbledon and the US Open; however, she won one singles title and three doubles titles on ITF events.

=== 2007 ===
In 2007, she made a breakthrough in her WTA ranking. She won three ITF titles, and her first WTA doubles title with compatriot Andrea Hlaváčková at the Prague Open defeating Chinese pair Ji Chunmei/Sun Shengnan in the final.

As the 22nd seed in qualifying at the US Open, Cetkovská qualified for the main draw defeating Abigail Spears, Lucie Hradecká, and Anne Keothavong. She made her Grand-Slam debut beating American Jill Craybas in the first round but ended up losing in the second round to 14th seed Elena Dementieva.

Cetkovská ended the season ranked 99.

=== 2008 ===
Cetkovská began her season by playing qualifying at the Hobart International where she lost in the second round to third seed Ashley Harkleroad. At the Australian Open, she was defeated in the first round by world No. 34, Anabel Medina Garrigues.

At the French Open, Cetkovská reached the fourth round, only to be beaten by eventual champion Ana Ivanovic without winning a game.

=== 2011 ===
Cetkovská reached her first WTA Tour singles final at the New Haven Open, losing to world No. 1 Caroline Wozniacki in straight sets.

=== 2014 ===
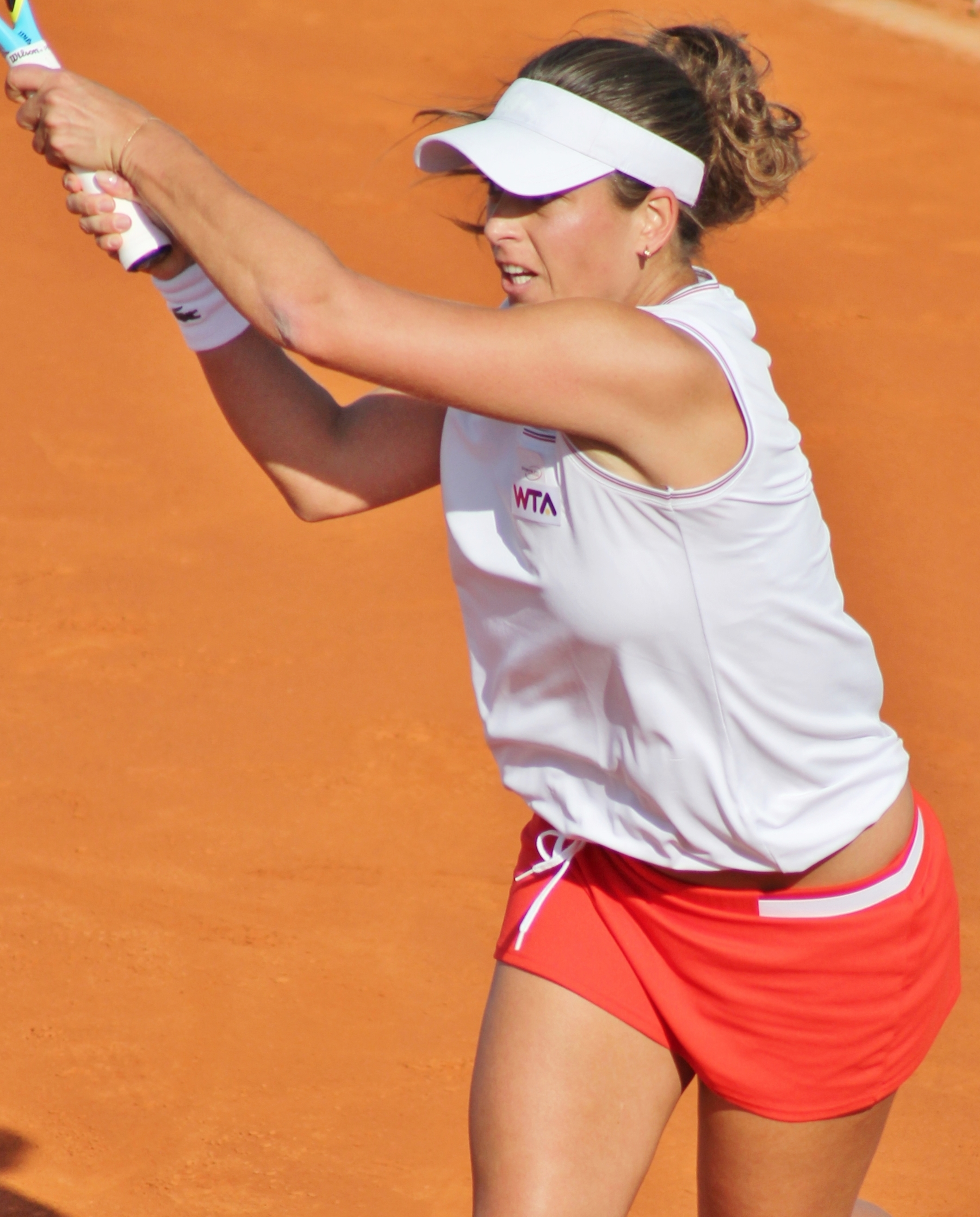
Cetkovská at the 2014 Madrid Open

Cetkovská began the season during the last week of January at the Open GdF Suez. She lost in the final round of qualifying to Anna-Lena Friedsam. The week of 10 February saw Cetkovská compete at the Qatar Open. As the 13th seed for qualifying, she advanced to the main draw defeating wildcard Michaela Hončová and Anastasia Rodionova. She had a good run reaching the quarterfinals beating 14th seed Sloane Stephens, Zhang Shuai, and top seed and world No. 3, Li Na. Cetkovská ended up losing in the quarterfinals to sixth seed and eventual finalist Angelique Kerber. She was only able to win one game during the match.

In March, Cetkovská traveled to Indian Wells, California to compete at the Indian Wells Masters. She was defeated in the first round by American wildcard Shelby Rogers. Next week, Cetkovská played at the Miami Masters where she lost in the final round of qualifying to 20th seed Estrella Cabeza Candela. After Miami, Cetkovská stayed in Florida and competed at the Oaks Club Challenger. As the seventh seed, she beat American Melanie Oudin in the first round. Her campaign at the tournament ended as she withdrew from her second-round match versus Kiki Bertens.

Cetkovská started off her clay-court season in Charleston at the Family Circle Cup. She won her first round match over American Varvara Lepchenko. She then lost in the second round to 13th seed Elena Vesnina. During the week of 21 April, Cetkovská competed at the Morocco Open in Marrakesh. She was defeated in the first round by third seed Yvonne Meusburger. Cetkovská qualified for the Madrid Open beating Monica Puig and Mona Barthel. In the main draw, she won her first-round match dispatching Stefanie Vögele. She suffered a three-set loss in the second round to 16th seed Sloane Stephens.

=== 2015 ===
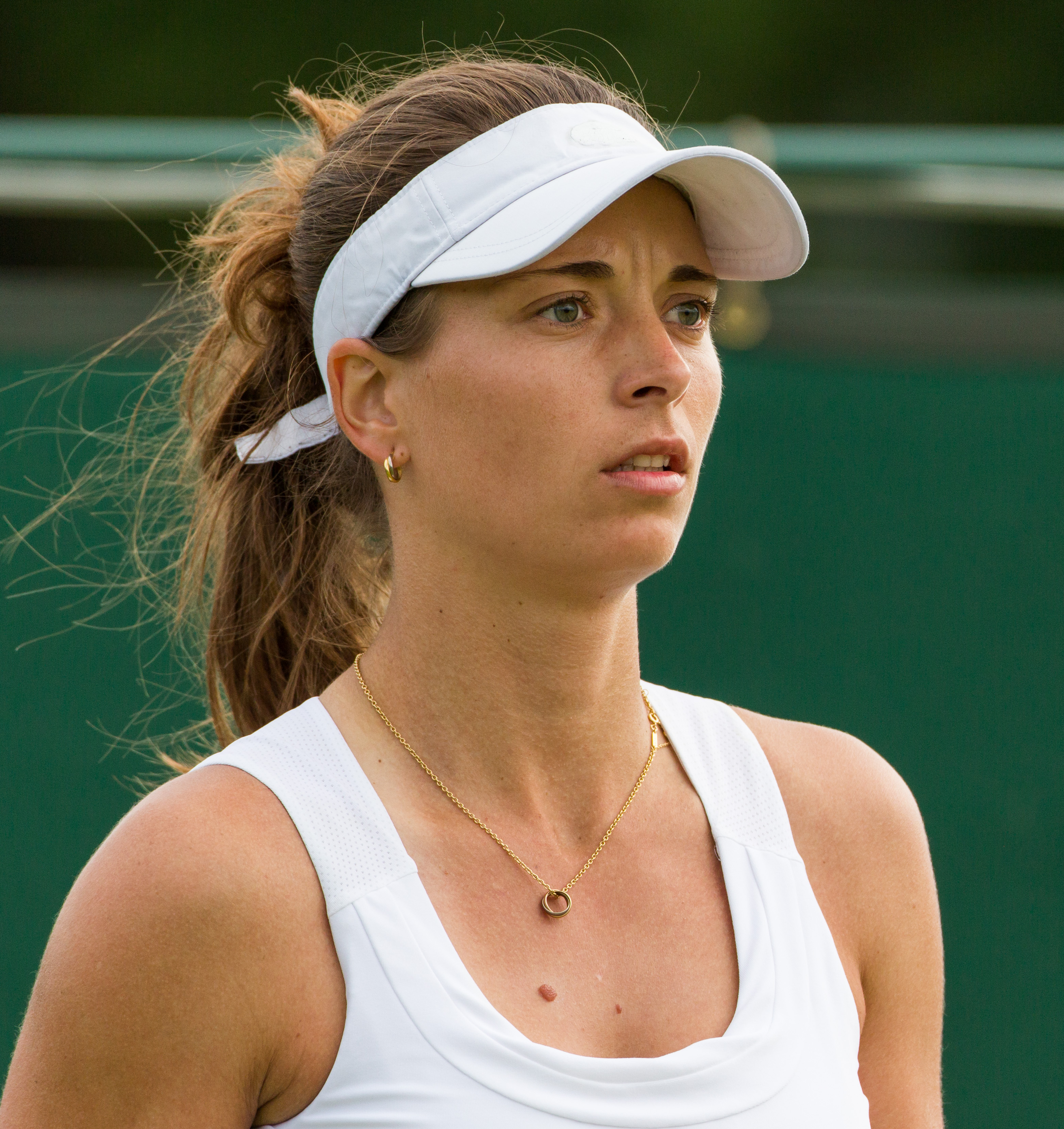
Cetkovská at the 2015 Wimbledon qualifying

Cetkovská withdrew from the Australian Open due to a hip injury. Cetkovská returned from injury in March at the Indian Wells Open. She lost in the first round to American Christina McHale. At the Miami Open, Cetkovská was defeated in the first round by wildcard Paula Badosa Gibert.

She suffered a first-round loss at the French Open to Misaki Doi.

Cetkovská began her grass-court season seeded third at the Surbiton Trophy. After a first-round win over British wildcard Laura Deigman, she faced another British player, Naomi Broady. Cetkovská ended up losing in the second round to Broady. She had another first-round loss, this time at the Birmingham Classic, to qualifier Marina Erakovic. Cetkovská qualified for Wimbledon defeating Renata Voráčová, 15th seed Donna Vekić, and Elise Mertens. In the main draw, she lost in the first round to Tímea Babos.

Two weeks later, Cetkovská competed at the ITS Cup in her home country where she was the third seed and the defending champion. She advanced to the final with wins over Rebecca Šramková, Irina Ramialison, sixth seed Akgul Amanmuradova, and Ekaterina Alexandrova. Cetkovská ended up losing in the final to top seed and compatriot Barbora Krejčíková. During the week of 27 July, Cetkovská traveled to Poland to play at the Powiat Poznański Open. She would go on to win the title defeating Sofia Shapatava, seventh seed Romina Oprandi, third seed Richèl Hogenkamp, qualifier and compatriot Martina Borecká, and fourth seed Jeļena Ostapenko. The week of 10 August saw Cetkovská playing a minor league tournament in Prague, the Prague Open, which was a brand new tournament. Playing as a wildcard, she lost in the semifinals to seventh seed María Teresa Torró Flor.

Cetkovská had a great run at the US Open. She started off the tournament by beating Christina McHale in the first round in three sets. In the second round, Cetkovská had a huge win, upsetting fourth seed and last year finalist, Caroline Wozniacki. She saved four match points to complete the upset. In the third round, she lost to 26th seed and eventual champion Flavia Pennetta. Nevertheless, this was her best performance at the US Open.

After the US Open, Cetkovská played at the Open de Saint-Malo. After winning her first-round match, she retired during her match against Laura Pous Tió. This ended up being her last tournament of the year.

Cetkovská ended the season ranked 131.

=== 2016 ===
Cetkovská was supposed to start her season at the Hobart International, but she withdrew before the tournament started due to a lower back injury. She returned to action by competing at the Australian Open. This had been the first time since 2012 that Cetkovská played this tournament. She lost in the first round to thirtieth seed Sabine Lisicki.

In March, Cetkovská played at the Indian Wells Open. She was crushed in the first round by Denisa Allertová. The week after Indian Wells, she flew to Miami to play at the Miami Open. Cetkovská was again crushed in the first round, this time by British wildcard Heather Watson.

Cetkovská was going to begin her clay-court season at the Charleston Open, but she withdrew from the tournament due to a right thigh injury. She returned in May to play at the French Open. Due to having a low ranking (136), she played qualifying in order to make it into the main draw. She retired in the first round of qualifying to Kristína Kučová.

During the week of 11 July, Cetkovská competed at the ITS Cup. Despite being the second seed and last year finalist, she lost in the second round to compatriot Gabriela Pantůčková. Two weeks later, Cetkovská played another tournament in her country, the Prague Open. There, she was defeated in the first round by Rebecca Peterson.

Cetkovská did not play anymore tournaments for the rest of the season. She ended the year ranked 581.

== Grand Slam performance timelines ==
Key
W	F	SF	QF	#R	RR	Q#	P#	DNQ	A	Z#	PO	G	S	B	NMS	NTI	P	NH

(W) winner; (F) finalist; (SF) semifinalist; (QF) quarterfinalist; (#R) rounds 4, 3, 2, 1; (RR) round-robin stage; (Q#) qualification round; (P#) preliminary round; (DNQ) did not qualify; (A) absent; (Z#) Davis/Fed Cup Zonal Group (with number indication) or (PO) play-off; (G) gold, (S) silver or (B) bronze Olympic/Paralympic medal; (NMS) not a Masters tournament; (NTI) not a Tier I tournament; (P) postponed; (NH) not held; (SR) strike rate (events won / competed); (W–L) win–loss record.
To avoid confusion and double counting, these charts are updated at the conclusion of a tournament or when the player's participation has ended.

=== Singles ===
Tournament	2006	2007	2008	2009	2010	2011	2012	2013	2014	2015	2016	W–L
Australian Open	A	A	1R	1R	A	Q1	2R	A	A	A	1R	1–4
French Open	Q2	Q2	4R	1R	A	Q3	2R	3R	1R	1R	Q1	6–6
Wimbledon	Q2	Q3	1R	1R	A	4R	2R	3R	2R	1R	A	7–7
US Open	Q2	2R	1R	Q1	Q2	2R	A	1R	2R	3R	A	5–6
Win–Loss	0–0	1–1	3–4	0–3	0–0	4–2	3–3	4–3	2–3	2–3	0–1	19–23
Career statistics
Year-end ranking	219	103	82	149	142	31	55	132	59	131	581	

=== Doubles ===
Tournament	2007	2008	2009	2011	2012	2013	2014	2015	2016	W–L
Australian Open	A	A	1R	A	2R	A	A	A	A	1–2
French Open	1R	1R	1R	A	1R	A	1R	1R	A	0–6
Wimbledon	1R	1R	A	Q1	1R	A	1R	A	A	0–4
US Open	1R	1R	A	1R	A	2R	2R	A	A	2–5
Win–Loss	0–3	0–3	0–2	0–1	1–3	1–1	1–3	0–1	0–0	3–17

== WTA Tour finals ==
=== Singles: 1 (runner-up) ===
Legend
Premier (0–1)

Result	Date	Tournament	Tier	Surface	Opponent	Score
Loss	Aug 2011	Connecticut Open, United States	Premier	Hard	(Denmark) Caroline Wozniacki	4–6, 1–6

=== Doubles: 5 (2 titles, 3 runner-ups) ===
Legend
Tier III & IV / International (2–3)

Result	W–L	Date	Tournament	Tier	Surface	Partner	Opponents	Score
Win	1–0	May 2007	Prague Open, Czech Republic	Tier IV	Clay	(Czech Republic) Andrea Hlaváčková	(China) Ji Chunmei (China) Sun Shengnan	7–6^{(9–7)}, 6–2
Loss	1–1	Mar 2008	Mexican Open, Mexico	Tier III	Clay	(Czech Republic) Iveta Benešová	(Spain) Nuria Llagostera Vives (Spain) María José Martínez Sánchez	2–6, 4–6
Loss	1–2	Aug 2008	Nordic Light Open, Sweden	Tier IV	Hard	(Czech Republic) Lucie Šafářová	(Czech Republic) Iveta Benešová (Czech Republic) Barbora Záhlavová-Strýcová	5–7, 4–6
Win	2–2	Apr 2012	Morocco Open, Morocco	International	Clay	(Russia) Alexandra Panova	(Romania) Irina-Camelia Begu (Romania) Alexandra Cadanțu	3–6, 7–6^{(7–5)}, [11–9]
Loss	2–3	Mar 2014	Mexican Open, Mexico	International	Hard	(Czech Republic) Iveta Melzer	(France) Kristina Mladenovic (Kazakhstan) Galina Voskoboeva	3–6, 6–2, [5–10]

== ITF Circuit finals ==
=== Singles: 36 (23 titles, 13 runner-ups) ===
Legend 100K tournaments (1–3) 75K tournaments (1–0) 50K tournaments (4–2) 25K tournaments (10–5) 10K tournaments (7–3)	Finals by surface Hard (7–7) Clay (15–5) Grass (1–1)

Result	W–L	Date	Tournament	Tier	Surface	Opponent	Score
Win	1–0	Apr 2001	ITF Hvar, Croatia	10K	Clay	(Croatia) Sanda Mamić	6–3, 6–1
Win	2–0	Nov 2001	ITF Stupava, Slovakia	10K	Hard	(Poland) Joanna Sakowicz-Kostecka	6–1, 6–4
Win	3–0	Mar 2002	ITF Athens, Greece	10K	Clay	(Slovenia) Tina Hergold	6–3, 6–2
Win	4–0	Jun 2002	ITF Tallinn, Estonia	25K	Clay	(United States) Tiffany Davis	6–3, 4–6, 6–1
Loss	4–1	Aug 2002	ITF Aosta, Italy	25K	Clay	(Argentina) Natalia Gussoni	0–6, 2–6
Win	5–1	Aug 2003	ITF Sezze, Italy	10K	Clay	(Sweden) Hanna Nooni	6–7^{(5–7)}, 6–3, 6–2
Loss	5–2	Aug 2004	ITF Gdynia, Poland	10K	Clay	(Poland) Karolina Kosińska	3–6, 2–6
Loss	5–3	Aug 2004	ITF Jesi, Italy	10K	Hard	(Italy) Rita Degliesposti	3–6, 2–6
Loss	5–4	Mar 2005	ITF Gran Canaria, Spain	10K	Hard	(Spain) Carla Suárez Navarro	6–2, 4–6, 3–6
Win	6–4	May 2005	ITF Tenerife, Spain	25K	Hard	(Spain) Carla Suárez Navarro	6–7^{(0–7)}, 6–3, 6–1
Win	7–4	Jul 2005	ITF Zwevegem, Belgium	10K	Clay	(Italy) Stefania Chieppa	6–4, 6–2
Win	8–4	Aug 2005	ITF Gdynia, Poland	10K	Clay	(Poland) Agnieszka Radwańska	6–3, 6–4
Win	9–4	Aug 2005	ITF Kedzierzyn kozle, Poland	25K	Clay	(Argentina) Natalia Gussoni	3–6, 6–4, 6–3
Win	10–4	Sep 2005	ITF Ibaraki, Japan	25K	Hard	(Japan) Erika Takao	2–6, 7–5, 6–3
Win	11–4	Oct 2005	Lagos Open, Nigeria	25K	Hard	(United Kingdom) Anne Keothavong	3–6, 6–3, 6–2
Win	12–4	Apr 2006	ITF Dubai, United Arab Emirates	10K	Hard	(Ukraine) Kateryna Herth	1–6, 7–6^{(8–6)}, 6–2
Loss	12–5	May 2006	ITF Antalya, Turkey	25K	Clay	(Switzerland) Romina Oprandi	3–6, 5–7
Loss	12–6	Oct 2006	Batumi Ladies Open, Georgia	25K	Hard	(Romania) Ágnes Szatmári	3–6, 3–6
Loss	12–7	Mar 2007	ITF Las Palmas, Spain	25K	Hard	(Germany) Angelique Kerber	2–6, 6–1, 4–6
Win	13–7	Mar 2007	ITF Tenerife, Spain	25K	Hard	(Germany) Angelique Kerber	7–5, 5–7, 7–6^{(7–5)}
Loss	13–8	May 2007	Open Saint-Gaudens, France	50K	Clay	(Ukraine) Tatiana Perebiynis	7–5, 5–7, 5–7
Loss	13–9	Jul 2007	ITF Valladolid, Spain	25K	Hard	(Spain) Nuria Llagostera Vives	6–7^{(3–7)}, 6–1, 3–6
Win	14–9	Jul 2007	ITF Felixstowe, England	25K	Grass	(Portugal) Neuza Silva	6–2, 6–4
Win	15–9	Jul 2007	ITF Zwevegem, Belgium	25K	Clay	(Slovakia) Lenka Wienerová	6–1, 5–7, 6–0
Win	16–9	May 2008	Open Romania Ladies	50K	Clay	(Romania) Sorana Cîrstea	7–6^{(7–5)}, 7–6^{(7–3)}
Win	17–9	May 2008	Open Saint-Gaudens, France	50K	Clay	(Spain) María José Martínez Sánchez	6–4, 6–4
Win	18–9	Jun 2010	ITF Périgueux, France	25K	Clay	(Georgia (country)) Margalita Chakhnashvili	2–6, 6–1, 6–1
Win	19–9	Jul 2010	ITF Mont-de-Marsan, France	25K	Clay	(Bulgaria) Elitsa Kostova	6–2, 6–2
Win	20–9	Oct 2010	ITF Jounieh Open, Lebanon	100K+H	Clay	(France) Mathilde Johansson	6–1, 6–3
Win	21–9	Apr 2011	Torneo Conchita Martínez, Spain	50K	Hard	(Belgium) Kirsten Flipkens	5–7, 6–4, 6–2
Loss	21–10	Apr 2011	Soweto Open, South Africa	100K	Hard	(Russia) Valeria Savinykh	1–6, 2–6
Loss	21–11	Jun 2011	Nottingham Challenge, UK	100K	Grass	(United Kingdom) Elena Baltacha	5–7, 3–6
Loss	21–12	Jul 2011	ITF Pétange, Luxembourg	100K	Hard	(France) Mathilde Johansson	5–7, 3–6
Win	22–12	Jul 2014	ITS Cup Olomouc, Czech Republic	50K	Clay	(Czech Republic) Denisa Allertova	3–6, 6–1, 6–4
Loss	22–13	Jul 2015	ITS Cup Olomouc, Czech Republic	50K	Clay	(Czech Republic) Barbora Krejčíková	6–3, 4–6, 6–7^{(5–7)}
Win	23–13	Aug 2015	Poznański Open, Poland	75K	Clay	(Latvia) Jeļena Ostapenko	3–6, 7–5, 6–2

=== Doubles: 40 (25 titles, 15 runner-ups) ===
Legend 100K tournaments (5–1) 50K tournaments (4–3) 25K tournaments (7–6) 10K tournaments (9–5)	Finals by surface Hard (7–8) Clay (17–7) Grass (1–0)

Result	W–L	Date	Tournament	Tier	Surface	Partner	Opponents	Score
Win	1–0	Aug 2000	ITF Valašské Meziříčí, Czech Republic	10K	Clay	(Czech Republic) Pavlina Tichá	(Czech Republic) Petra Plačková (Czech Republic) Andrea Plačková	6–4, 6–2
Win	2–0	Apr 2001	ITF Cavtat, Croatia	10K	Clay	(Czech Republic) Pavlina Tichá	(Netherlands) Natasha Galouza (Netherlands) Lotty Seelen	6–2, 6–1
Loss	2–1	Nov 2001	ITF Stupava, Slovakia	10K	Hard (i)	(Czech Republic) Libuše Průšová	(Russia) Galina Fokina (Hungary) Eszter Molnár	3–6, 4–6
Win	3–1	Apr 2002	ITF Makarska, Croatia	10K	Clay	(Slovenia) Tina Hergold	(Switzerland) Daniela Casanova (Croatia) Marijana Kovačević	7–5, 6–2
Win	4–1	Jun 2002	ITF Tallinn, Estonia	25K	Clay	(Poland) Joanna Sakowicz-Kostecka	(Austria) Petra Rüssegger (Germany) Stefanie Weis	6–2, 4–6, 6–4
Loss	4–2	Oct 2002	ITF Hallandale Beach, United States	25K	Hard	(Czech Republic) Barbora Strýcová	(Argentina) Gisela Dulko (Venezuela) Milagros Sequera	2–6, 5–7
Loss	4–3	May 2003	ITF Biograd, Croatia	10K	Clay	(Czech Republic) Paulina Slitrová	(Bosnia and Herzegovina) Mervana Jugić-Salkić (Croatia) Darija Jurak	4–6, 4–6
Loss	4–4	Jun 2003	ITF Vaduz, Liechtenstein	25K	Clay	(Czech Republic) Jana Hlaváčková	(Hungary) Zsófia Gubacsi (Czech Republic) Zuzana Hejdová	4–6, 4–6
Win	5–4	Sep 2004	ITF Durmersheim, Germany	10K	Clay	(Czech Republic) Janette Bejlková	(Germany) Carmen Klaschka (Germany) Imke Kusgen	6–3, 7–6^{(7–4)}
Win	6–4	Sep 2004	ITF Jounieh Open, Lebanon	50K	Hard	(Czech Republic) Hana Šromová	(Spain) Nuria Llagostera Vives (Portugal) Frederica Piedade	6–4, 6–2
Win	7–4	Nov 2004	ITF Cairo, Egypt	10K	Clay	(France) Pauline Parmentier	(Russia) Galina Fokina (Russia) Raissa Gourevitch	6–4, 6–2
Win	8–4	Feb 2005	ITF Mallorca, Spain	10K	Clay	(Poland) Olga Brózda	(Spain) Adriana Gonzalez-Peñas (Switzerland) Romina Oprandi	6–3, 6–4
Win	9–4	Feb 2005	ITF Las Palmas, Spain	10K	Hard	(Spain) Katia Sabate	(Netherlands) Bibiane Schoofs (Spain) Laura Vallverdu-Zaira	6–7^{(5–7)}, 6–3, 6–1
Loss	9–5	May 2005	Torneo Conchita Martínez, Spain	25K	Hard	(Spain) Gabriela Velasco Andreu	(Ukraine) Olena Antypina (South Africa) Surina De Beer	5–7, 5–7
Win	10–5	Jun 2005	ITF Lenzerheide, Switzerland	10K	Clay	(Switzerland) Martina Lautenschläger	(Germany) Diana Vrânceanu (Austria) Eva-Maria Hoch	6–0, 6–3
Loss	10–6	Jun 2005	ITF Davos, Switzerland	10K	Clay	(Bosnia and Herzegovina) Sandra Martinović	(Czech Republic) Zuzana Hejdová (Germany) Andrea Petkovic	3–6, 2–6
Loss	10–7	Jul 2005	ITF Zwevegem, Belgium	10K	Clay	(Spain) Gabriela Velasco Andreu	(Belgium) Leslie Butkiewicz (Belgium) Caroline Maes	3–6, 2–6
Loss	10–8	Aug 2005	ITF Gardone Val Trompia, Italy	10K	Clay	(Luxembourg) Mandy Minella	(Argentina) María Corbalán (Italy) Sonia Iacovacci	w/o
Win	11–8	Mar 2006	ITF Abu Dhabi, UAE	10K	Hard	(Slovenia) Andreja Klepač	(Ukraine) Katerina Avdiyenko (Russia) Kristina Grigorian	6–1, 6–3
Win	12–8	May 2006	ITF Caserta, Italy	25K	Clay	(Czech Republic) Sandra Záhlavová	(Italy) Silvia Disderi (Italy) Valentina Sulpizio	6–2, 6–0
Win	13–8	Oct 2006	Batumi Ladies Open, Georgia	25K	Hard	(Turkey) İpek Şenoğlu	(Russia) Vasilisa Davydova (Russia) Marina Shamayko	6–4, 3–6, 6–4
Win	14–8	Feb 2007	ITF Prague, Czech Republic	25K	Hard (i)	(Czech Republic) Veronika Chvojková	(Slovakia) Katarína Kachlíková (Slovakia) Lenka Tvarošková	6–2, 6–3
Loss	14–9	Mar 2007	ITF Tenerife, Spain	25K	Hard	(Czech Republic) Veronika Chvojková	(Czech Republic) Andrea Hlaváčková (Estonia) Margit Rüütel	3–2 ret.
Win	15–9	Mar 2007	ITF La Palma, Spain	25K	Hard	(Czech Republic) Andrea Hlaváčková	(Spain) Arantxa Parra Santonja (United Kingdom) Melanie South	6–3, 6–2
Win	16–9	Apr 2007	ITF Calvià, Spain	25K	Clay	(Czech Republic) Andrea Hlaváčková	(Spain) Arantxa Parra Santonja (Spain) María José Martínez Sánchez	7–5, 6–4
Loss	16–10	Jul 2007	ITF Les Contamines, France	25K	Hard	(Czech Republic) Sandra Záhlavová	(Russia) Anastasia Pavlyuchenkova (Belgium) Yanina Wickmayer	w/o
Loss	16–11	Oct 2007	Open de Touraine, France	50K	Hard (i)	(Czech Republic) Barbora Strýcová	(Poland) Klaudia Jans-Ignacik (Poland) Alicja Rosolska	3–6, 5–7
Win	17–11	May 2008	Romania Ladies Open	50K	Clay	(Czech Republic) Hana Šromová	(Romania) Sorana Cîrstea (Romania) Ágnes Szatmári	6–4, 7–5
Win	18–11	Oct 2008	Internationaux de la Vienne, France	100K	Hard (i)	(Czech Republic) Lucie Šafářová	(Uzbekistan) Akgul Amanmuradova (Romania) Monica Niculescu	6–4, 6–4
Loss	18–12	Jul 2009	International Country Cuneo, Italy	100K	Clay	(France) Mathilde Johansson	(Uzbekistan) Akgul Amanmuradova (Belarus) Darya Kustova	7–5, 1–6, [7–10]
Loss	18–13	Oct 2009	ITF İstanbul, Turkey	25K	Hard (i)	(Czech Republic) Renata Voráčová	(Russia) Nina Bratchikova (Kyrgyzstan) Ksenia Palkina	w/o
Win	19–13	May 2010	ITF Jounieh Open, Lebanon	50K	Clay	(Czech Republic) Renata Voráčová	(Belarus) Ksenia Milevskaya (Ukraine) Lesia Tsurenko	6–4, 6–2
Loss	19–14	May 2010	Sparta Prague Open, Czech Republic	50K	Clay	(Czech Republic) Eva Hrdinová	(Russia) Ksenia Lykina (Slovenia) Maša Zec Peškirič	3–6, 4–6
Win	20–14	Jun 2010	ITF Szczecin, Poland	25K	Clay	(Czech Republic) Eva Hrdinová	(Ukraine) Veronika Kapshay (Germany) Justine Ozga	7–6^{(7–5)}, 6–3
Win	21–14	Sep 2010	Open de Saint-Malo, France	100K	Clay	(Czech Republic) Lucie Hradecká	(Ukraine) Mariya Koryttseva (Romania) Raluca Olaru	6–4, 6–2
Win	22–14	Oct 2010	ITF Jounieh Open, Lebanon (2)	100K	Clay	(Czech Republic) Renata Voráčová	(Czech Republic) Eva Birnerová (Slovenia) Andreja Klepač	7–5, 6–2
Win	23–14	May 2011	Sparta Prague Open, Czech Republic	100K	Clay	(Netherlands) Michaëlla Krajicek	(United States) Lindsay Lee-Waters (United States) Megan Moulton-Levy	6–2, 6–1
Win	24–14	Jun 2011	Nottingham Challenge, UK	100K	Grass	(Czech Republic) Eva Birnerová	(Russia) Regina Kulikova (Russia) Evgeniya Rodina	6–3, 6–2
Loss	24–15	Oct 2012	Open Nantes Atlantique, France	50K	Hard	(Czech Republic) Renata Voráčová	(Colombia) Catalina Castaño (Bosnia and Herzegovina) Mervana Jugić-Salkić	4–6, 4–6
Win	25–15	Jul 2014	ITS Cup, Czech Republic	50K	Clay	(Czech Republic) Renata Voráčová	(Czech Republic) Barbora Krejčíková (Serbia) Aleksandra Krunić	6–2, 4–6, [10–7]

== Wins over top 10 players ==
No.	Player	Rk	Event	Surface	Rd	Score	Rk	Years	Ref
1	(France) Marion Bartoli	10	Birmingham Classic, United Kingdom	Grass	2R	5–7, 6–4, 6–0		2008	
2	(Russia) Elena Dementieva	4	Indian Wells Open, United States	Hard	2R	7–6^{(7–2)}, 2–6, 6–1		2009	
3	(France) Marion Bartoli	9	Connecticut Open, United States	Hard	QF	7–5, 7–5		2011	
4	(China) Li Na	7	Connecticut Open, United States	Hard	SF	6–2, 5–7, 7–6^{(9)}		2011	
5	(Russia) Vera Zvonareva	10	Madrid Open, Spain	Clay	1R	6–2, 6–2		2012	
6	(Poland) Agnieszka Radwańska	3	Italian Open, Italy	Clay	2R	6–4, 4–6, 6–1		2012	
7	(Denmark) Caroline Wozniacki	9	Wimbledon, United Kingdom	Grass	2R	6–2, 6–2		2013	
8	(China) Li Na	3	Qatar Open, Qatar	Hard	3R	7–6^{(7–2)}, 2–6, 6–4		2014	
9	(Germany) Angelique Kerber	9	Italian Open, Italy	Clay	2R	4–6, 6–3, 6–4		2014	
10	(Denmark) Caroline Wozniacki	5	US Open, United States	Hard	2R	6–4, 5–7, 7–6^{(7–1)}		2015	

- Key: (Rk) first use, opponent rank; (Rd) round; (Rk) 2nd use, player rank; (Ref) reference; (F) final; (SF) semifinal; (QF) quarterfinal; (#R) rounds 4, 3, 2, 1; (RR) round-robin stage; (Q#) qualifying rounds or stages (3), 2, 1.
