= 2014 Powiat Poznański Open – Doubles =

Doubles
- 2014 Powiat Poznański Open

Final
- Champions: (Czech Republic) Barbora Krejčíková (Serbia) Aleksandra Krunić
- Runners-up: (Ukraine) Anastasiya Vasylyeva (Ukraine) Maryna Zanevska
- Score: 3–6, 6–0, [10–6]

Events
Singles	Doubles
Powiat Poznański Open	· 2015 →

The tournament in Sobota was a new addition to the ITF Women's Circuit.

The fourth seeds Barbora Krejčíková and Aleksandra Krunić won the tournament, defeating third seeds Anastasiya Vasylyeva and Maryna Zanevska in the final, 3–6, 6–0, [10–6].

== Seeds ==
1. (Liechtenstein) Stephanie Vogt / (Czech Republic) Renata Voráčová (semifinals)
2. (Argentina) Tatiana Búa / (Chile) Daniela Seguel (first round)
3. (Ukraine) Anastasiya Vasylyeva / (Ukraine) Maryna Zanevska (final)
4. (Czech Republic) Barbora Krejčíková / (Serbia) Aleksandra Krunić (champions)

== Draw ==
=== Key ===
- Q = Qualifier
- WC = Wild card
- LL = Lucky loser
- Alt = Alternate
- SE = Special exempt
- PR = Protected ranking
- ITF = ITF entry
- JE = Junior exempt
- w/o = Walkover
- r = Retired
- d = Defaulted
- SR = Special ranking

First round
1	(Liechtenstein) S Vogt (Czech Republic) R Voráčová	6	6
WC	(Poland) K Kawa (Czech Republic) K Kramperová	4	2
(Russia) O Doroshina (Russia) N Dzalamidze	6	4	[10]
WC	(Poland) B Sobaszkiewicz (Poland) S Zagórska	1	6	[7]
3	(Ukraine) A Vasylyeva (Ukraine) M Zanevska	6	6
(Germany) K Barrois (Germany) D Pfizenmaier	2	2
(Czech Republic) L Kunčíková (Czech Republic) K Stuchlá	4	6	[7]
WC	(Poland) M Fręch (United States) N Suk	6	4	[10]
(Italy) G Gatto-Monticone (Italy) A Grymalska	6	6
(Latvia) D Marcinkēviča (Australia) K Wlodarczak	3	4
(Netherlands) R Hogenkamp (Germany) J Ozga	2	1
4	(Czech Republic) B Krejčíková (Serbia) A Krunić	6	6
(Netherlands) L Kerkhove (Netherlands) A Rus	6	6
(Spain) I Ferrer Suárez (Spain) B García Vidagany	1	2
(Czech Republic) E Birnerová (Czech Republic) H Birnerová	6	4	[10]
2	(Argentina) T Búa (Chile) D Seguel	1	6	[7]

Quarterfinals
1	(Liechtenstein) S Vogt (Czech Republic) R Voráčová	7^{7}	4	[10]
(Russia) O Doroshina (Russia) N Dzalamidze	6^{2}	6	[8]
3	(Ukraine) A Vasylyeva (Ukraine) M Zanevska	6	6
WC	(Poland) M Fręch (United States) N Suk	1	1
(Italy) G Gatto-Monticone (Italy) A Grymalska	6	0	[10]
4	(Czech Republic) B Krejčíková (Serbia) A Krunić	3	6	[12]
(Netherlands) L Kerkhove (Netherlands) A Rus	6	6
(Czech Republic) E Birnerová (Czech Republic) H Birnerová	2	4

Semifinals
1	(Liechtenstein) S Vogt (Czech Republic) R Voráčová	6	6^{9}	[7]
3	(Ukraine) A Vasylyeva (Ukraine) M Zanevska	2	7^{11}	[10]
4	(Czech Republic) B Krejčíková (Serbia) A Krunić	6	7
(Netherlands) L Kerkhove (Netherlands) A Rus	4	5

Final
3	(Ukraine) A Vasylyeva (Ukraine) M Zanevska	6	0	[6]
4	(Czech Republic) B Krejčíková (Serbia) A Krunić	3	6	[10]
