= 2015 Powiat Poznański Open – Doubles =

Doubles
- 2015 Powiat Poznański Open

Final
- Champions: (Netherlands) Kiki Bertens (Netherlands) Richèl Hogenkamp
- Runners-up: (Sweden) Cornelia Lister (Latvia) Jeļena Ostapenko
- Score: 7–6^{(7–2)}, 6–4

Events
Singles	Doubles
← 2014 ·	Powiat Poznański Open

Barbora Krejčíková and Aleksandra Krunić were the defending champions, but Krunić chose not to participate. Krejčíková partnered Katarzyna Piter, but lost in the quarterfinals to Tatiana Búa and Georgina García Pérez.

Kiki Bertens and Richèl Hogenkamp won the title, defeating Cornelia Lister and Jeļena Ostapenko in the final, 7–6^{(7–2)}, 6–4.

== Seeds ==
1. (Belgium) Ysaline Bonaventure / (Slovakia) Janette Husárová (semifinals)
2. (Czech Republic) Barbora Krejčíková / (Poland) Katarzyna Piter (quarterfinals)
3. (Argentina) Florencia Molinero / (Liechtenstein) Stephanie Vogt (first round)
4. (Netherlands) Kiki Bertens / (Netherlands) Richèl Hogenkamp (champions)

== Draw ==
=== Key ===
- Q = Qualifier
- WC = Wild card
- LL = Lucky loser
- Alt = Alternate
- SE = Special exempt
- PR = Protected ranking
- ITF = ITF entry
- JE = Junior exempt
- w/o = Walkover
- r = Retired
- d = Defaulted
- SR = Special ranking

First round
1	(Belgium) Y Bonaventure (Slovakia) J Husárová	6	6
(India) S Baluu (Germany) N Siedliska	3	0
(Poland) M Fręch (Poland) K Kawa	3	6	[8]
WC	(Poland) A Barańska (United States) N Suk	6	4	[10]
4	(Netherlands) K Bertens (Netherlands) R Hogenkamp	6	6
(Mexico) C Fuentes (United States) K Stewart	3	3
WC	(Poland) A Buczyńska (Poland) J Dobrowolska	7	6
WC	(Poland) E Iwaniuk (Poland) D Szczygielska	5	4
(Romania) D Buzean (Hungary) R-L Jani	6	2	[6]
(Sweden) C Lister (Latvia) J Ostapenko	1	6	[10]
(Czech Republic) L Kunčíková (Czech Republic) K Stuchlá	6	6
3	(Argentina) F Molinero (Liechtenstein) S Vogt	1	3
(Argentina) T Búa (Spain) G García Pérez	6	6
(Poland) V Domagała (Australia) K Wlodarczak	2	3
(Poland) J Jegiołka (Latvia) D Marcinkēviča	6	1	[5]
2	(Czech Republic) B Krejčíková (Poland) K Piter	2	6	[10]

Quarterfinals
1	(Belgium) Y Bonaventure (Slovakia) J Husárová	6	6
WC	(Poland) A Barańska (United States) N Suk	2	3
4	(Netherlands) K Bertens (Netherlands) R Hogenkamp	6	6
WC	(Poland) A Buczyńska (Poland) J Dobrowolska	2	2
(Sweden) C Lister (Latvia) J Ostapenko	7	6
(Czech Republic) L Kunčíková (Czech Republic) K Stuchlá	5	1
(Argentina) T Búa (Spain) G García Pérez	6	3	[11]
2	(Czech Republic) B Krejčíková (Poland) K Piter	4	6	[9]

Semifinals
1	(Belgium) Y Bonaventure (Slovakia) J Husárová	4	2
4	(Netherlands) K Bertens (Netherlands) R Hogenkamp	6	6
(Sweden) C Lister (Latvia) J Ostapenko	6	6
(Argentina) T Búa (Spain) G García Pérez	4	4

Final
4	(Netherlands) K Bertens (Netherlands) R Hogenkamp	7^{7}	6
(Sweden) C Lister (Latvia) J Ostapenko	6^{2}	4
