= 2008 Salwator Cup =

- Date: 3–9 November
- Edition: 1st
- Location: Kraków, Poland

Champions

Singles
- (United Kingdom) Anne Keothavong

Doubles
- (Germany) Angelique Kerber / (Poland) Urszula Radwańska
- Salwator Cup

The 2008 Salwator Cup was a professional tennis tournament played on hard courts. It was the first edition of the tournament which was part of the 2008 ITF Women's Circuit. It took place in Kraków, Poland between 3 and 9 November 2008.

== WTA entrants ==
=== Seeds ===
Country	Player	Seed
RUS	Alisa Kleybanova	1
THA	Tamarine Tanasugarn	2
ROU	Monica Niculescu	3
CZE	Petra Kvitová	4
TPE	Chan Yung-Jan	5
GBR	Anne Keothavong	6
CZE	Barbora Záhlavová-Strýcová	7
RUS	Elena Vesnina	8

- Petra Kvitová withdrew from the tournament and was replaced by lucky loser.

=== Other entrants ===
The following players received wildcards into the singles main draw:

- (Poland) Anna Korzeniak
- (Poland) Olga Brózda
- (Poland) Katarzyna Piter
- (Germany) Angelique Kerber

The following players received entry from the qualifying draw:

- (Lithuania) Lina Stančiūtė
- (Ukraine) Viktoria Kutuzova
- (Ukraine) Veronika Kapshay
- (Bosnia and Herzegovina) Mervana Jugić-Salkić

The following player received entry from a Lucky loser spot:

- (Estonia) Margit Rüütel
- (Bulgaria) Huliya Velieva

== Champions ==
=== Singles ===
(United Kingdom) Anne Keothavong def. (Romania) Monica Niculescu, 7–6^{(4)},4–6. 6–3

=== Doubles ===
(Germany) Angelique Kerber / (Poland) Urszula Radwańska def. (Poland) Olga Brózda / (Poland) Sandra Zaniewska, 6–3, 6–2
