= 2014 Powiat Poznański Open – Singles =

Singles
- 2014 Powiat Poznański Open

Final
- Champion: (Slovakia) Kristína Kučová
- Runner-up: (Bulgaria) Sesil Karatantcheva
- Score: 1–6, 7–5, 6–3

Events
Singles	Doubles
Powiat Poznański Open	· 2015 →

The tournament in Sobota was a new addition to the ITF Women's Circuit.

The second seed Kristína Kučová won the title, defeating Sesil Karatantcheva in the final, 1–6, 7–5, 6–3.

== Seeds ==
1. (Czech Republic) Andrea Hlaváčková (first round)
2. (Slovakia) Kristína Kučová (champion)
3. (Germany) Dinah Pfizenmaier (first round)
4. (Netherlands) Arantxa Rus (second round)
5. (Ukraine) Maryna Zanevska (quarterfinals)
6. (Serbia) Aleksandra Krunić (second round)
7. (Ukraine) Anastasiya Vasylyeva (first round)
8. (Netherlands) Richèl Hogenkamp (first round)

== Main draw ==
=== Key ===
- Q = Qualifier
- WC = Wild card
- LL = Lucky loser
- Alt = Alternate
- SE = Special exempt
- PR = Protected ranking
- ITF = ITF entry
- JE = Junior exempt
- w/o = Walkover
- r = Retired
- d = Defaulted
- SR = Special ranking

=== Finals ===
Semifinals
(Liechtenstein) Stephanie Vogt	3	3
(Kazakhstan) Sesil Karatantcheva	6	6
(Czech Republic) Renata Voráčová	1	2
2	(Slovakia) Kristína Kučová	6	6

Final
(Kazakhstan) Sesil Karatantcheva	6	5	3
2	(Slovakia) Kristína Kučová	1	7	6

=== Top half ===
First round
1	(Czech Republic) A Hlaváčková	6	6^{6}	2
(Liechtenstein) S Vogt	3	7^{8}	6
(Latvia) D Marcinkēviča	4	6	4
Q	(Czech Republic) P Mendesová	6	3	6
(Italy) G Gatto-Monticone	7^{7}	6
(Spain) B García Vidagany	6^{5}	2
(Germany) K Barrois	4	4
8	(Netherlands) R Hogenkamp	6	6
3	(Germany) D Pfizenmaier	7^{7}	6
Q	(Russia) V Savinykh	6^{5}	3
(Romania) A Mitu	6	6
Q	(Russia) N Dzalamidze	3	3
(Kazakhstan) S Karatantcheva	6	6
Q	(Italy) A Grymalska	0	3
(Germany) C Witthöft	7	6
7	(Ukraine) A Vasylyeva	5	3

Second round
(Liechtenstein) S Vogt	7	6
Q	(Czech Republic) P Mendesová	5	1
(Italy) G Gatto-Monticone	6	6
8	(Netherlands) R Hogenkamp	1	4
3	(Germany) D Pfizenmaier	5	3
(Romania) A Mitu	7	6
(Kazakhstan) S Karatantcheva	6	6
(Germany) C Witthöft	4	3

Quarterfinals
(Liechtenstein) S Vogt	6	6
(Italy) G Gatto-Monticone	3	4
(Romania) A Mitu	3	6	1
(Kazakhstan) S Karatantcheva	6	2	6

Semifinals
(Liechtenstein) S Vogt	3	3
(Kazakhstan) S Karatantcheva	6	6

=== Bottom half ===
First round
5	(Ukraine) M Zanevska	6	6
WC	(United States) N Suk	1	1
SE	(Czech Republic) B Krejčíková	4	4
(Netherlands) L Kerkhove	6	6
(Czech Republic) R Voráčová	6	6
WC	(Poland) M Fręch	2	2
WC	(Poland) K Kawa	4	6	6^{1}
4	(Netherlands) A Rus	6	3	7^{7}
6	(Serbia) A Krunić	6	2	6
LL	(Lithuania) L Stančiūtė	2	6	2
SE	(Switzerland) L Michel	6	6
WC	(Poland) D Kuczer	4	2
(Czech Republic) E Birnerová	6	7^{7}
(Netherlands) I de Vroome	4	6^{2}
LL	(Spain) I Ferrer Suárez	1	6	2
2	(Slovakia) K Kučová	6	4	6

Second round
5	(Ukraine) M Zanevska	5	7	6
(Netherlands) L Kerkhove	7	5	2
(Czech Republic) R Voráčová	6	6
4	(Netherlands) A Rus	4	0
6	(Serbia) A Krunić	3	4
SE	(Switzerland) L Michel	6	6
(Czech Republic) E Birnerová	2	4
2	(Slovakia) K Kučová	6	6

Quarterfinals
5	(Ukraine) M Zanevska	2	3
(Czech Republic) R Voráčová	6	6
SE	(Switzerland) L Michel	3	6^{4}
2	(Slovakia) K Kučová	6	7^{7}

Semifinals
(Czech Republic) R Voráčová	1	2
2	(Slovakia) K Kučová	6	6
