= 2014 Qatar Total Open – Singles =

Singles
- 2014 Qatar Total Open

Final
- Champion: (Romania) Simona Halep
- Runner-up: (Germany) Angelique Kerber
- Score: 6–2, 6–3

Details
- Draw: 56
- Seeds: 16

Events
Singles	Doubles
- Qatar Total Open

Simona Halep defeated Angelique Kerber in the final, 6–2, 6–3 to win the singles tennis title at the 2014 WTA Qatar Open.

Victoria Azarenka was the two-time reigning champion, but withdrew before the tournament due to a foot injury.

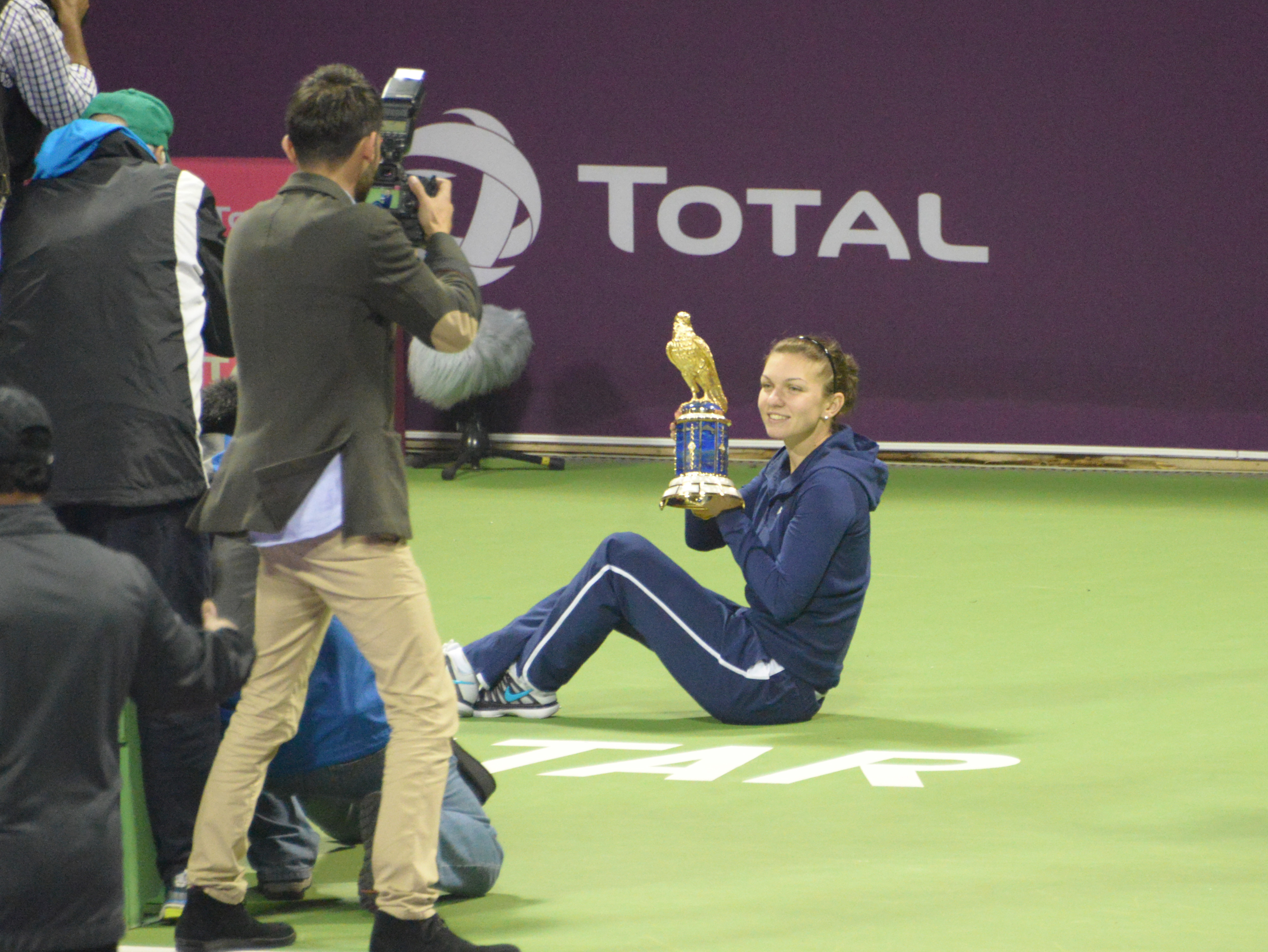
Simona Halep posing with the trophy

== Seeds ==
The top eight seeds receive a bye into the second round.

1. (China) Li Na (third round)
2. (Poland) Agnieszka Radwańska (semifinals)
3. (Czech Republic) Petra Kvitová (quarterfinals)
4. (Italy) Sara Errani (quarterfinals)
5. (Serbia) Jelena Janković (semifinals)
6. (Germany) Angelique Kerber (final)
7. (Romania) Simona Halep (champion)
8. (Denmark) Caroline Wozniacki (second round)
9. (Serbia) Ana Ivanovic (second round)
10. (Slovakia) Dominika Cibulková (first round, retired because of a gastrointestinal illness)
11. (Italy) Roberta Vinci (first round)
12. (Australia) Samantha Stosur (second round)
13. (Spain) Carla Suárez Navarro (withdrew because of an elbow injury)
14. (United States) Sloane Stephens (first round)
15. (Canada) Eugenie Bouchard (first round)
16. (Belgium) Kirsten Flipkens (first round)

Click on the seed number of a player to go to their draw section.

== Draw ==
Key

- Q = Qualifier
- WC = Wild card
- LL = Lucky loser
- Alt = Alternate
- ITF = ITF entry
- PR = Protected ranking
- SR = Special ranking
- SE = Special exempt
- JE = Junior exempt
- JR = Junior Accelerator Programme entrant
- CO = College Accelerator Programme entrant
- NG = Next Gen Accelerator Program entrant
- w/o = Walkover
- r = Retired
- d = Defaulted

=== Finals ===
Quarterfinals
Q	(Czech Republic) Petra Cetkovská	1	0
6	(Germany) Angelique Kerber	6	6
3	(Czech Republic) Petra Kvitová	1	3
5	(Serbia) Jelena Janković	6	6
7	(Romania) Simona Halep	6	6
4	(Italy) Sara Errani	2	0
(Belgium) Yanina Wickmayer	2	1
2	(Poland) Agnieszka Radwańska	6	6

Semifinals
6	(Germany) Angelique Kerber	6	7^{8}
5	(Serbia) Jelena Janković	1	6^{6}
7	(Romania) Simona Halep	7	6
2	(Poland) Agnieszka Radwańska	5	2

Final
6	(Germany) Angelique Kerber	2	3
7	(Romania) Simona Halep	6	6

=== Top half ===
==== Section 1 ====
First round
(Italy) F Schiavone	5	6	6^{3}
(Slovakia) M Rybáriková	7	4	7^{7}
(China) S Zhang	6	6
Q	(Ukraine) M Zanevska	3	2
Q	(Czech Republic) P Cetkovská	7	6
14	(United States) S Stephens	5	1
9	(Serbia) A Ivanovic	7	1
(Slovakia) D Hantuchová	5	0^{r}
(Ukraine) E Svitolina	2	4
(Czech Republic) K Zakopalová	6	6
(Czech Republic) Ka Plíšková	6	6
WC	(Turkey) Ç Büyükakçay	3	3

Second round
1	(China) N Li	6	5	6
(Slovakia) M Rybáriková	1	7	2
(China) S Zhang	3	6	3
Q	(Czech Republic) P Cetkovská	6	4	6
9	(Serbia) A Ivanovic	6	1	3
(Czech Republic) K Zakopalová	4	6	6
(Czech Republic) Ka Plíšková	6^{2}	4
6	(Germany) A Kerber	7^{7}	6

Third round
1	(China) N Li	6^{2}	6	4
Q	(Czech Republic) P Cetkovská	7^{7}	2	6
(Czech Republic) K Zakopalová	2	3
6	(Germany) A Kerber	6	6

Quarterfinals
Q	(Czech Republic) P Cetkovská	1	0
6	(Germany) A Kerber	6	6

==== Section 2 ====
First round
(United States) V Williams	6	6
Q	(Croatia) P Martić	2	2
(China) S Peng	7^{7}	7
Q	(Russia) N Petrova	6^{5}	5
(Czech Republic) L Šafářová	5	6	6
16	(Belgium) K Flipkens	7	4	4
10	(Slovakia) D Cibulková	5^{r}
WC	(Russia) A Kleybanova	5
(Switzerland) S Vögele	7^{8}	7
(France) A Cornet	6^{6}	5
(Italy) K Knapp	6	6
(France) C Garcia	4	1

Second round
3	(Czech Republic) P Kvitová	6	2	7^{9}
(United States) V Williams	2	6	6^{7}
(China) S Peng	2	7	4
(Czech Republic) L Šafářová	6	5	6
WC	(Russia) A Kleybanova	6	6
(Switzerland) S Vögele	3	2
(Italy) K Knapp	0	2
5	(Serbia) J Janković	6	6

Third round
3	(Czech Republic) P Kvitová	7^{7}	5	6
(Czech Republic) L Šafářová	6^{2}	7	2
WC	(Russia) A Kleybanova	1	2
5	(Serbia) J Janković	6	6

Quarterfinals
3	(Czech Republic) P Kvitová	1	3
5	(Serbia) J Janković	6	6

=== Bottom half ===
==== Section 3 ====
First round
(Estonia) K Kanepi	6	6
(United States) V Lepchenko	3	4
(Germany) M Barthel	6^{5}	2
(Germany) A Beck	7^{7}	6
Q	(Bulgaria) T Pironkova	6	6
11	(Italy) R Vinci	3	3
15	(Canada) E Bouchard	5	1
(United States) B Mattek-Sands	7	6
(Romania) M Niculescu	6	6
WC	(Oman) F Al-Nabhani	1	0
Q	(Chinese Taipei) S-w Hsieh	7	6
(Italy) F Pennetta	5	3

Second round
7	(Romania) S Halep	6	3	7^{7}
(Estonia) K Kanepi	4	6	6^{5}
(Germany) A Beck	6^{5}	6	6
Q	(Bulgaria) T Pironkova	7^{7}	2	2
(United States) B Mattek-Sands	1	6	3
(Romania) M Niculescu	6	3	6
Q	(Chinese Taipei) S-w Hsieh	0	4
4	(Italy) S Errani	6	6

Third round
7	(Romania) S Halep	6	6
(Germany) A Beck	4	1
(Romania) M Niculescu	6	5	1
4	(Italy) S Errani	2	7	6

Quarterfinals
7	(Romania) S Halep	6	6
4	(Italy) S Errani	2	0

==== Section 4 ====
First round
(Germany) A Petkovic	4	4
(Belgium) Y Wickmayer	6	6
(France) K Mladenovic	4	6^{5}
(Slovakia) J Čepelová	6	7^{7}
(New Zealand) M Erakovic	4	2
12	(Australia) S Stosur	6	6
LL	(Slovenia) T Majerič	7	2	3
(Russia) A Pavlyuchenkova	5	6	6
Q	(Croatia) M Lučić-Baroni	4	6	6
(Austria) Y Meusburger	6	2	3
Q	(Russia) A Kudryavtseva	6	1	5
(Romania) S Cîrstea	2	6	7

Second round
8	(Denmark) C Wozniacki	4	5
(Belgium) Y Wickmayer	6	7
(Slovakia) J Čepelová	6	4	6
12	(Australia) S Stosur	4	6	1
(Russia) A Pavlyuchenkova	4	1
Q	(Croatia) M Lučić-Baroni	6	6
(Romania) S Cîrstea	5	0
2	(Poland) A Radwańska	7	6

Third round
(Belgium) Y Wickmayer	1	6	6
(Slovakia) J Čepelová	6	2	0
Q	(Croatia) M Lučić-Baroni	4	1^{r}
2	(Poland) A Radwańska	6	0

Quarterfinals
(Belgium) Y Wickmayer	2	1
2	(Poland) A Radwańska	6	6

== Qualifying ==
=== Seeds ===
1. (Bulgaria) Tsvetana Pironkova (qualified)
2. (Chinese Taipei) Hsieh Su-wei (qualified)
3. (Russia) Nadia Petrova (qualified)
4. (Croatia) Petra Martić (qualified)
5. (Croatia) Mirjana Lučić-Baroni (qualified)
6. (Kazakhstan) Zarina Diyas (first round, retired)
7. (Russia) Alla Kudryavtseva (qualified)
8. (Ukraine) Maryna Zanevska (qualified)
9. (Slovenia) Tadeja Majerič (qualifying competition, lucky loser)
10. (Russia) Vera Dushevina (first round)
11. (France) Claire Feuerstein (qualifying competition)
12. (Russia) Alexandra Panova (first round)
13. (Czech Republic) Petra Cetkovská (qualified)
14. (France) Mathilde Johansson (qualifying competition)
15. (Romania) Alexandra Dulgheru (qualifying competition)
16. (Czech Republic) Kristýna Plíšková (qualifying competition)

=== Qualifiers ===
1. (Bulgaria) Tsvetana Pironkova
2. (Chinese Taipei) Hsieh Su-wei
3. (Russia) Nadia Petrova
4. (Croatia) Petra Martić
5. (Croatia) Mirjana Lučić-Baroni
6. (Czech Republic) Petra Cetkovská
7. (Russia) Alla Kudryavtseva
8. (Ukraine) Maryna Zanevska

=== Lucky losers ===
1. (Slovenia) Tadeja Majerič

=== Draw ===
==== First qualifier ====
First round
1	(Bulgaria) Tsvetana Pironkova	6	6
(Russia) Vitalia Diatchenko	2	3
(Germany) Kristina Barrois	4	4
15	(Romania) Alexandra Dulgheru	6	6

Qualifying competition
1	(Bulgaria) Tsvetana Pironkova	6	7
15	(Romania) Alexandra Dulgheru	2	5

==== Second qualifier ====
First round
2	(Chinese Taipei) Hsieh Su-wei	6	6
WC	(France) Laura Thorpe	2	4
(Russia) Ekaterina Bychkova	2	3
9	(Slovenia) Tadeja Majerič	6	6

Qualifying competition
2	(Chinese Taipei) Hsieh Su-wei	6	6
9	(Slovenia) Tadeja Majerič	1	4

==== Third qualifier ====
First round
3	(Russia) Nadia Petrova	6	6
WC	(Poland) Marta Domachowska	3	3
(Ukraine) Yuliya Beygelzimer	6	6
10	(Russia) Vera Dushevina	3	0

Qualifying competition
3	(Russia) Nadia Petrova	6	6
(Ukraine) Yuliya Beygelzimer	3	3

==== Fourth qualifier ====
First round
4	(Croatia) Petra Martić	6	7^{7}
(Australia) Arina Rodionova	4	6^{2}
WC	(Ukraine) Irina Buryachok	1	2
16	(Czech Republic) Kristýna Plíšková	6	6

Qualifying competition
4	(Croatia) Petra Martić	5	6	6
16	(Czech Republic) Kristýna Plíšková	7	4	4

==== Fifth qualifier ====
First round
5	(Croatia) Mirjana Lučić-Baroni	7	6
(Slovakia) Kristina Kučová	5	4
(Montenegro) Danka Kovinić	6	6
12	(Russia) Alexandra Panova	3	3

Qualifying competition
5	(Croatia) Mirjana Lučić-Baroni	6	6
(Montenegro) Danka Kovinić	4	4

==== Sixth qualifier ====
First round
6	(Kazakhstan) Zarina Diyas	6^{6}	2^{r}
(Australia) Anastasia Rodionova	7^{8}	3
WC	(Slovakia) Michaela Hončová	0	2
13	(Czech Republic) Petra Cetkovská	6	6

Qualifying competition
(Australia) Anastasia Rodionova	2	0^{r}
13	(Czech Republic) Petra Cetkovská	6	3

==== Seventh qualifier ====
First round
7	(Russia) Alla Kudryavtseva	6	6
(China) Duan Yingying	2	4
(Spain) Arantxa Parra Santonja	6	5	3
11	(France) Claire Feuerstein	1	7	6

Qualifying competition
7	(Russia) Alla Kudryavtseva	6	6
11	(France) Claire Feuerstein	2	2

==== Eighth qualifier ====
First round
8	(Ukraine) Maryna Zanevska	6	6
(Italy) Alberta Brianti	2	2
(Czech Republic) Eva Birnerová	6	2	2
14	(France) Mathilde Johansson	4	6	6

Qualifying competition
8	(Ukraine) Maryna Zanevska	6^{6}	7^{10}	6
14	(France) Mathilde Johansson	7^{8}	6^{8}	3
