= 2011 New Haven Open at Yale – Singles =

Singles
- 2011 New Haven Open at Yale

Final
- Champion: (Denmark) Caroline Wozniacki
- Runner-up: (Czech Republic) Petra Cetkovská
- Score: 6–4, 6–1

Details
- Draw: 30
- Seeds: 8

Events
Singles	Doubles
- New Haven Open at Yale

World No. 1 Caroline Wozniacki was the three-time defending champion and successfully retained her title, defeating qualifier Petra Cetkovská 6–4, 6–1 in the final.

== Seeds ==
The top two seeds received a bye into the second round.

1. (Denmark) Caroline Wozniacki (champion)
2. (China) Li Na (semifinals)
3. (Italy) Francesca Schiavone (semifinals)
4. (France) Marion Bartoli (quarterfinals)
5. (Poland) Agnieszka Radwańska (second round)
6. (Russia) Svetlana Kuznetsova (first round)
7. (Serbia) Jelena Janković (first round)
8. (Russia) Anastasia Pavlyuchenkova (quarterfinals)

== Draw ==
Key

- Q = Qualifier
- WC = Wild card
- LL = Lucky loser
- Alt = Alternate
- ITF = ITF entry
- PR = Protected ranking
- SR = Special ranking
- SE = Special exempt
- JE = Junior exempt
- JR = Junior Accelerator Programme entrant
- CO = College Accelerator Programme entrant
- NG = Next Gen Accelerator Program entrant
- w/o = Walkover
- r = Retired
- d = Defaulted

=== Finals ===
Semifinals
1	(Denmark) Caroline Wozniacki	7^{7}	6
3	(Italy) Francesca Schiavone	6^{2}	3
Q	(Czech Republic) Petra Cetkovská	6	5	7^{11}
2/WC	(China) Li Na	2	7	6^{9}

Final
1	(Denmark) Caroline Wozniacki	6	6
Q	(Czech Republic) Petra Cetkovská	4	1

=== Top half ===
First round
(Slovenia) P Hercog	7	7
(Russia) N Petrova	5	5
(Czech Republic) I Benešová	3	2
LL	(Spain) C Suárez Navarro	6	6
WC	(United States) C McHale	7	6
6	(Russia) S Kuznetsova	5	3
3	(Italy) F Schiavone	6	6
(Romania) A Dulgheru	1	2
(Romania) M Niculescu	6	6
(Bulgaria) T Pironkova	3	2
(Spain) A Medina Garrigues	6	7^{7}
Q	(Russia) K Pervak	2	6^{5}
(Russia) E Vesnina	6	2	6
7/WC	(Serbia) J Janković	4	6	4

Second round
1	(Denmark) C Wozniacki	6	6
(Slovenia) P Hercog	3	0
LL	(Spain) C Suárez Navarro	2	2
WC	(United States) C McHale	6	6
3	(Italy) F Schiavone	6	6
(Romania) M Niculescu	2	1
(Spain) A Medina Garrigues	6	7^{7}
(Russia) E Vesnina	2	6^{5}

Quarterfinals
1	(Denmark) C Wozniacki	7	6
WC	(United States) C McHale	5	3
3	(Italy) F Schiavone	w/o
(Spain) A Medina Garrigues

Semifinals
1	(Denmark) C Wozniacki	7^{7}	6
3	(Italy) F Schiavone	6^{2}	3

=== Bottom half ===
First round
5	(Poland) A Radwańska	6	6
(Russia) E Makarova	1	2
(Japan) A Morita	2	2
Q	(Czech Republic) P Cetkovská	6	6
(Czech Republic) K Zakopalová	7	6
(Italy) F Pennetta	5	2
Q	(Australia) A Rodionova	1	4
4/WC	(France) M Bartoli	6	6
8	(Russia) A Pavlyuchenkova	3	6	6
Q	(Russia) V Dushevina	6	4	3
(Czech Republic) L Hradecká	6	3	3
(Italy) R Vinci	3	6	6
(Italy) S Errani	5	5
(Russia) M Kirilenko	7	7

Second round
5	(Poland) A Radwańska	4	7	3
Q	(Czech Republic) P Cetkovská	6	5	6
(Czech Republic) K Zakopalová	2	6	1
4/WC	(France) M Bartoli	6	2	6
8	(Russia) A Pavlyuchenkova	6	6
(Italy) R Vinci	2	4
(Russia) M Kirilenko	4	6^{4}
2/WC	(China) N Li	6	7^{7}

Quarterfinals
Q	(Czech Republic) P Cetkovská	7	7
4/WC	(France) M Bartoli	5	5
8	(Russia) A Pavlyuchenkova	4	6	2
2/WC	(China) N Li	6	3	6

Semifinals
Q	(Czech Republic) P Cetkovská	6	5	7^{11}
2/WC	(China) N Li	2	7	6^{9}
