= Kristína Kučová =

Slovak tennis player (born 1990)

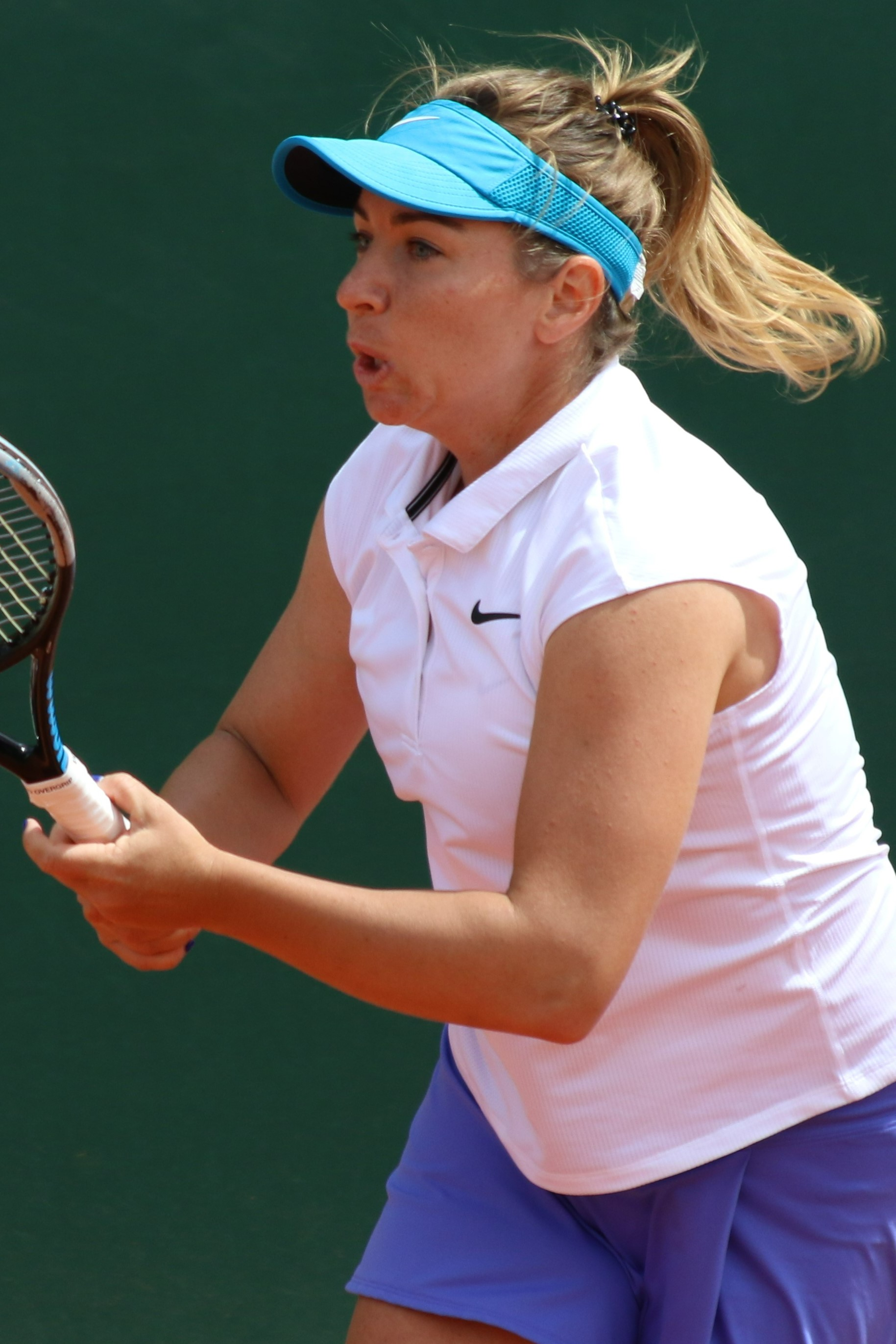
- Kučová at the 2022 French Open
- Country (sports): Slovakia
- Residence: Bratislava, Slovakia
- Born: 23 May 1990 (age 36) Bratislava, Czechoslovakia
- Height: 1.63 m (5 ft 4 in)
- Turned pro: 2007
- Retired: 2023
- Plays: Right (two-handed both sides)
- Prize money: $2,066,546

Singles
- Career record: 427–346
- Career titles: 1 WTA Challenger, 11 ITF
- Highest ranking: No. 71 (12 September 2016)

Grand Slam singles results
- Australian Open: 2R (2017, 2022)
- French Open: 2R (2019)
- Wimbledon: 2R (2009, 2017, 2022)
- US Open: 2R (2021)

Doubles
- Career record: 60–73
- Career titles: 5 ITF
- Highest ranking: No. 168 (5 October 2009)

Grand Slam doubles results
- French Open: 2R (2022)
- Wimbledon: 1R (2022)

Team competitions
- Fed Cup: 1–5

Kristína Kučová (Slovak pronunciation: [ˈkristiːna ˈkutʂɔʋaː]; born 23 May 1990) is a former Slovak tennis player. On 12 September 2016, she reached her best singles ranking of world No. 71. On 5 October 2009, she peaked at No. 168 in the WTA doubles rankings. She won one singles title on the WTA Challenger Tour with eleven singles titles and five doubles titles on the ITF Women's Circuit. She retired at the 2023 Jasmin Open in Monastir.

Kučová was an accomplished junior player, having won the girls' singles title at the 2007 US Open and reaching a combined career-high junior ranking of world No. 3, on 10 September 2009.

Playing for Slovakia Fed Cup team, she has a win–loss record of 1–5.

== Personal life ==
Kučová's elder sister Zuzana retired from the professional tour in 2013.

== Tennis career ==
=== Junior years ===
At the 2007 US Open, the unseeded Kučová took the girls' singles title, defeating the 13th seed Julia Glushko in the third round, top seed and defending champion Anastasia Pavlyuchenkova in the quarterfinals, and number two seed Urszula Radwańska in the final. Kučová also reached the 2007 Wimbledon Championships and 2007 French Open girls' doubles quarterfinals. She reached the French Open quarterfinals with her compatriot Klaudia Boczová, losing to the eventual champions and third seeds, Ksenia Milevskaya and Urszula Radwańska. With her compatriot Lenka Juríková, she reached the Wimbledon quarterfinals and lost to the eventual runners-up Misaki Doi and Kurumi Nara.

=== 2014 ===
Kučová started the year in the qualifying for Sydney where she lost to Misaki Doi, then she lost in the first round of qualifying for the Australian Open to Paula Kania in three sets. She lost in qualifying for Doha to Mirjana Lučić-Baroni in straight sets, and also in Dubai where she lost to Flavia Pennetta. She managed to qualify for Katowice and then beat Monica Niculescu 6–1, 6–1 in the first round, before losing to Alizé Cornet. She lost in qualifying for the French Open to the wildcard entrant Irina Ramialison, 1–6, 0–6, and in qualifying for Wimbledon to Maryna Zanevska.

She reached her first WTA Tour semifinal at Bucharest by beating Anna Schmiedlová, Cristina Dinu and Danka Kovinić, before losing to Roberta Vinci 1–6, 3–6 in the semifinals. She won the $50k event in Sobota, Poland by beating Sesil Karatantcheva in the final. She won a $25k event in Fleurus, Belgium by beating Evgeniya Rodina in the final. She lost in the second round of qualifying in Linz to Anna-Lena Friedsam, and in the first round of qualifying for Limoges to Katarzyna Piter.

=== 2016: Breakthrough, Canadian Open semifinalist and top 100 ===
Kučová failed to qualify for the Australian Open. She lost in the final qualifying round to Wang Yafan, despite having a match point in the second set.

After defeating Stefanie Vögele and Hsieh Su-wei, Kučová reached the quarterfinals in Kuala Lumpur, where she lost to the second seed Elina Svitolina despite winning the first set 6–1.

She qualified for the main draw of the Canadian Open by defeating Erin Routliffe and Christina McHale. She upset Yanina Wickmayer in the first round, who had won the singles and doubles titles in Washington the week before. In the second round, she caused a bigger upset by defeating the No. 8 seed, Carla Suárez Navarro, setting up a third-round clash with the Canadian Eugenie Bouchard. Kučová won the match in three sets to reach her first WTA Premier-level quarterfinal, where she beat the 15th seed, Johanna Konta, in straight sets. She was eventually eliminated in the semifinals by the tenth seed, Madison Keys. Following the tournament, she broke into the top 100 for the first time in her career.

=== 2019–23: First WTA 125 title, maiden WTA Tour final, retirement ===
Kučová won her first WTA 125 title at the Sparta Prague Open, defeating Elisabetta Cocciaretto in the final.

At the 2021 Miami Open, she qualified for the main draw and proceeded to face world No. 1 and defending champion, Ashleigh Barty, in the second round, losing the match in three sets

In July 2021, she reached her first WTA 250 final, at the Poland Open, but lost to Maryna Zanevska.

At the 2021 US Open, Kučová qualified for the first time in five years, after entering the main draw as lucky loser, and won her first match at this major against Ann Li. She lost to 12th seed Simona Halep in the second round.

In January 2023, she entered the Australian Open using protected ranking, losing in the first round to qualifier Diana Shnaider in straight sets.

Kučová retired from professional tennis in October 2023, with her final appearance being at the 2023 Jasmin Open.

== Performance timeline ==
Key
W	F	SF	QF	#R	RR	Q#	P#	DNQ	A	Z#	PO	G	S	B	NMS	NTI	P	NH

(W) winner; (F) finalist; (SF) semifinalist; (QF) quarterfinalist; (#R) rounds 4, 3, 2, 1; (RR) round-robin stage; (Q#) qualification round; (P#) preliminary round; (DNQ) did not qualify; (A) absent; (Z#) Davis/Fed Cup Zonal Group (with number indication) or (PO) play-off; (G) gold, (S) silver or (B) bronze Olympic/Paralympic medal; (NMS) not a Masters tournament; (NTI) not a Tier I tournament; (P) postponed; (NH) not held; (SR) strike rate (events won / competed); (W–L) win–loss record.
To avoid confusion and double counting, these charts are updated at the conclusion of a tournament or when the player's participation has ended.

Only main-draw results in WTA Tour, Grand Slam tournaments, Fed Cup/Billie Jean King Cup and Olympic Games are included in win–loss records.

=== Singles ===
Tournament	2008	2009	2010	2011	2012	2013	2014	2015	2016	2017	2018	2019	2020	2021	2022	2023	SR	W–L	Win%
Grand Slam tournaments
Australian Open	A	A	1R	A	Q1	A	Q1	Q2	Q3	2R	1R	A	Q1	Q1	2R	1R	0 / 5	2–5	29%
French Open	A	Q1	Q1	Q1	A	A	Q1	Q1	Q3	1R	1R	2R	Q1	Q2	1R	1R	0 / 5	1–5	17%
Wimbledon	A	2R	Q1	Q1	A	A	Q1	Q1	Q2	2R	A	Q1	NH	Q2	2R	A	0 / 3	3–3	50%
US Open	Q2	Q1	Q1	Q2	A	A	Q1	Q1	1R	A	A	Q3	A	2R	A	A	0 / 2	1–2	33%
Win–loss	0–0	1–1	0–1	0–0	0–0	0–0	0–0	0–0	0–1	2–3	0–2	1–1	0–0	1–1	2–3	0–2	0 / 15	7–15	32%
WTA 1000
Dubai / Qatar Open (Note: The first Premier 5 event of the year has switched back and forth between the Dubai Tennis Championships and the Qatar Ladies Open since 2009. Dubai was classified as a Premier 5 event from 2009 to 2011 before being succeeded by Doha for the 2012–2014 period. In 2015, Dubai regained its Premier 5 status while Doha was demoted to Premier status. The Premier 5 tournaments were reclassified as WTA 1000 tournaments in 2021.)	A	A	A	A	A	A	Q1	Q1	A	A	Q2	A	A	A	Q2	Q1	0 / 0	0–0	–
Indian Wells Open	A	A	Q1	A	A	A	A	A	A	A	Q1	A	NH	2R	2R	A	0 / 2	1–2	33%
Miami Open	A	A	Q1	A	A	A	A	A	A	1R	A	A	NH	2R	1R	Q2	0 / 3	1–3	25%
Madrid Open	A	A	A	A	A	A	A	A	A	A	A	A	NH	A	Q1	Q1	0 / 0	0–0	–
Italian Open	A	A	A	A	A	A	A	A	A	A	A	A	A	A	Q2	A	0 / 0	0–0	–
Canadian Open	A	A	A	A	A	A	A	A	SF	A	A	A	NH	A	A	A	0 / 1	4–1	80%
Cincinnati Open	A	A	A	A	A	A	A	A	A	A	A	A	A	A	A	A	0 / 0	0–0	–
Wuhan Open	A	A	A	A	A	A	A	A	A	A	A	A	NH			A	0 / 0	0–0	–
China Open	A	A	A	A	A	A	A	A	A	A	A	A	NH			A	0 / 0	0–0	–
Career statistics
Tournaments	0	3	3	2	0	1	4	4	8	9	5	5	1	8	8	1	Career total: 62		
Titles	0	0	0	0	0	0	0	0	0	0	0	0	0	0	0	0	Career total: 0		
Finals	0	0	0	0	0	0	0	0	0	0	0	0	0	1	0	0	Career total: 1		
Overall win–loss	0–0	1–3	0–4	2–2	0–0	0–1	4–5	1–4	10–8	3–10	2–5	1–5	0–1	10–8	4–8	0–1	0 / 62	38–65	37%
Year-end ranking	217	105	234	205	287	154	143	147	80	243	265	169	149	109	185		$1,890,388		

== WTA Tour finals ==
=== Singles: 1 (runner-up) ===
Legend WTA 250 (0–1)	Finals by surface Clay (0–1)

Result	Date	Tournament	Tier	Surface	Opponent	Score
Loss	Jul 2021	Poland Open	WTA 250	Clay	(Belgium) Maryna Zanevska	4–6, 6–7^{(3–7)}

== WTA 125 finals ==
=== Singles: 1 (title) ===
Result	Date	Tournament	Surface	Opponent	Score
Win	Sep 2020	Sparta Prague Open, Czech Republic	Clay	(Italy) Elisabetta Cocciaretto	6–4, 6–3

== ITF Circuit finals ==
Legend
$100,000 tournaments
$80,000 tournaments
$60,000 tournaments
$25,000 tournaments
$10,000 tournaments

=== Singles: 25 (11 titles, 14 runner-ups) ===
Result	W–L	Date	Tournament	Tier	Surface	Opponent	Score
Loss	0–1	Apr 2007	ITF Hvar, Croatia	10,000	Clay	(Serbia) Karolina Jovanović	1–6, 4–6
Win	1–1	May 2007	ITF Michalovce, Slovakia	10,000	Clay	(Poland) Katarzyna Piter	2–6, 6–3, 6–4
Loss	1–2	May 2008	ITF Galați, Romania	10,000	Clay	(Italy) Valentina Sulpizio	2–6, 6–7^{(2–7)}
Loss	1–3	Aug 2008	Ladies Open Hechingen, Germany	25,000	Clay	(Slovenia) Maša Zec Peškirič	6–3, 6–7^{(1–7)}, 3–6
Loss	1–4	Sep 2008	Maribor Open, Slovenia	50,000	Clay	(Slovenia) Maša Zec Peškirič	2–6, 6–7^{(6–8)}
Loss	1–5	Mar 2009	ITF La Palma, Spain	25,000	Hard	(Latvia) Anastasija Sevastova	6–4, 1–6, 1–6
Loss	1–6	Jun 2009	Open de Pozoblanco, Spain	50,000	Hard	(Germany) Angelique Kerber	3–6, 4–6
Loss	1–7	Jun 2010	ITF Brno, Czech Republic	25,000	Clay	(Czech Republic) Zuzana Ondrášková	3–6, 6–4, 2–6
Loss	1–8	Sep 2010	ITF Bucharest, Romania	25,000	Clay	(Romania) Mădălina Gojnea	4–6, 4–6
Win	2–8	Jun 2012	ITF Alkmaar, Netherlands	10,000	Clay	(Austria) Janina Toljan	6–3, 6–4
Win	3–8	Jul 2012	ITF Denain, France	25,000	Clay	(Slovakia) Michaela Hončová	6–2, 1–6, 6–2
Loss	3–9	Jun 2013	ITF Zlín, Czech Republic	25,000	Clay	(Austria) Melanie Klaffner	3–6, 2–6
Win	4–9	Jul 2013	ITF Les Contamines, France	25,000	Hard	(France) Clothilde de Bernardi	7–5, 6–7^{(3–7)}, 6–3
Win	5–9	Aug 2013	ITF Craiova, Romania	50,000	Clay	(Italy) Alberta Brianti	7–5, 3–6, 6–4
Loss	5–10	Sep 2013	Sofia Cup, Bulgaria	25,000	Clay	(Austria) Patricia Mayr-Achleitner	2–6, 6–1, 3–6
Loss	5–11	Oct 2013	ITF Herzliya, Israel	25,000	Hard	(Ukraine) Yuliya Beygelzimer	3–6, 6–4, 2–5 ret.
Win	6–11	Jul 2014	Powiat Poznański Open, Poland	50,000	Clay	(Kazakhstan) Sesil Karatantcheva	1–6, 7–5, 6–3
Win	7–11	Aug 2014	ITF Fleurus, Belgium	25,000	Clay	(Russia) Evgeniya Rodina	6–3, 6–4
Win	8–11	Feb 2015	ITF Beinasco, Italy	25,000	Clay (i)	(Czech Republic) Barbora Krejčíková	6–4, 7–6^{(7–3)}
Win	9–11	Jul 2015	Bella Cup Toruń, Poland	25,000	Clay	(Italy) Giulia Gatto-Monticone	4–6, 6–1, 6–4
Win	10–11	Sep 2015	ITF Bucha, Ukraine	25,000	Clay	(Romania) Alexandra Cadanțu	4–6, 7–6^{(7–5)}, 6–0
Loss	10–12	Mar 2018	ITF Irapuato, Mexico	25,000	Hard	(Czech Republic) Marie Bouzková	4–6, 0–6
Loss	10–13	Feb 2019	Trnava Indoor, Slovakia	25,000	Hard (i)	(Czech Republic) Lucie Hradecká	4–6, 6–3, 6–7^{(0–7)}
Win	11–13	Apr 2019	Dothan Pro Classic, United States	80,000	Clay	(United States) Lauren Davis	3–6, 7–6^{(11–9)}, 6–2
Loss	11–14	Nov 2021	Dubai Tennis Challenge, UAE	100,000+H	Hard	(Ukraine) Daria Snigur	3–6, 0–6

=== Doubles: 7 (5 titles, 2 runner-ups) ===
Result	W–L	Date	Tournament	Tier	Surface	Partner	Opponents	Score
Win	1–0	Mar 2007	ITF Cairo, Egypt	10,000	Clay	(Slovakia) Zuzana Kučová	(United Kingdom) Melissa Berry (Netherlands) Michelle Gerards	6–7^{(3–7)}, 6–4, 6–3
Win	2–0	May 2007	ITF Michalovce, Slovakia	10,000	Clay	(Slovakia) Klaudia Boczová	(Poland) Olga Brózda (Poland) Justyna Jegiołka	7–5, 4–6, 6–3
Loss	2–1	May 2008	ITF Jounieh Open, Lebanon	50,000	Clay	(Switzerland) Stefanie Vögele	(Russia) Nina Bratchikova (Ukraine) Veronika Kapshay	5–7, 6–3, [6–10]
Win	3–1	May 2008	ITF Galați, Romania	10,000	Clay	(Italy) Valentina Sulpizio	(Romania) Alexandra Cadanțu (Romania) Antonia Xenia Tout	6–0, 6–2
Loss	3–2	May 2009	Soweto Open, South Africa	100,000	Hard	(Latvia) Anastasija Sevastova	(United Kingdom) Naomi Cavaday (Ukraine) Lesia Tsurenko	2–6, 6–2, [9–11]
Win	4–2	Jun 2009	Zlín Open, Czech Republic	50,000	Clay	(Slovakia) Zuzana Kučová	(Czech Republic) Nikola Fraňková (Germany) Carmen Klaschka	6–3, 6–4
Win	5–2	Sep 2015	Open de Saint-Malo, France	50,000	Clay	(Latvia) Anastasija Sevastova	(Russia) Maria Marfutina (Russia) Natalia Vikhlyantseva	6–7^{(1–7)}, 6–3, [10–5]

== Fed Cup/Billie Jean King Cup participation ==
=== Singles (1–3) ===
Edition	Stage	Date	Location	Against	Surface	Opponent	W/L	Score
2008	WG2 PO	Apr 2008	Bratislava (SVK)	(Uzbekistan) Uzbekistan	Clay (i)	Vlada Ekshibarova	W	6–1, 2–6, 6–4
2010	WG2	Apr 2010	Bratislava (SVK)	(China) China	Hard (i)	Han Xinyun	L	1–6, 1–6
2014	WG PO	Apr 2014	Quebec City (CAN)	(Canada) Canada	Hard (i)	Eugenie Bouchard	L	6–7^{(0–7)}, 6–2, 1–6
2017	WG PO	Apr 2017	Bratislava (SVK)	(Netherlands) Netherlands	Clay (i)	Richèl Hogenkamp	L	5–7, 4–6

=== Doubles (0–2) ===
Edition	Stage	Date	Location	Against	Surface	Partner	Opponents	W/L	Score
2010	WG2	Feb 2010	Bratislava (SVK)	China	Hard (i)	Dominika Cibulková	Lu Jingjing; Zhang Shuai	L	3–2 ret.
2015	WG2	Feb 2015	Apeldoorn (NED)	Netherlands	Clay (i)	Kristína Schmiedlová	Richèl Hogenkamp; Michaëlla Krajicek	L	5–7, 1–6

== Junior Grand Slam tournament finals ==
=== Girls' singles: 1 (title) ===
Result	Year	Tournament	Surface	Opponent	Score
Win	2007	US Open	Hard	(Poland) Urszula Radwańska	6–3, 1–6, 7–6^{(7–4)}

== Head-to-head record ==
=== Top 10 wins ===
#	Player	Rank	Event	Surface	Rd	Score
2016
1.	(Spain) Carla Suárez Navarro	No. 9	Canadian Open	Hard	2R	3–6, 6–4, 6–4
