= WSG Open =

ITF Women's Tour
- Event name: WSG Open
- Location: Warsaw, Poland; Sobota, Poland (2014–15); Kraków (2008)
- Venue: Sekcja Tenisa Legia Warszawa; Centrum Tenisowe Sobota (2014–15)
- Category: ITF Women's Circuit
- Surface: Clay; Hard (indoor) (2008)
- Draw: 32S/32Q/16D
- Prize money: $25,000 (2017–18) $60,000 (2019) $75,000 (2014–15) $100,000+H (2008)
- Website: www.sportsgroup.pl/wsg-open Official website

The WSG Open was a tournament for professional female tennis players played on outdoor clay courts. The event was classified as a $60,000 ITF Women's Circuit tournament and had been held in Warsaw, Poland since 2017.

The Powiat Poznański Open was classified as a $75k tournament and held in Sobota, Poland on outdoor clay courts from 2014 to 2015.

The Salwator Cup was classified as a $100k+H tournament and held in Kraków, Poland on indoor hardcourts in 2008.

== Past finals ==
=== Singles ===
Year	Champion	Runner-up	Score
2019	(Poland) Maja Chwalińska	(Russia) Anastasiya Komardina	6–3, 6–0
2018	(Ukraine) Olga Ianchuk	(Argentina) Victoria Bosio	6–3, 4–6, 6–3
2017	(Italy) Martina Trevisan	(Ukraine) Olga Ianchuk	6–2, 6–4
2016	Not held		
2015	(Czech Republic) Petra Cetkovská	(Latvia) Jeļena Ostapenko	3–6, 7–5, 6–2
2014	(Slovakia) Kristína Kučová	(Kazakhstan) Sesil Karatantcheva	1–6, 7–5, 6–3
2009–13	Not held		
2008	(United Kingdom) Anne Keothavong	(Romania) Monica Niculescu	7–6^{(7–4)}, 4–6, 6–3

=== Doubles ===
Year	Champions	Runners-up	Score
2019	(Poland) Maja Chwalińska (Norway) Ulrikke Eikeri	(Poland) Weronika Falkowska (Poland) Martyna Kubka	6–4, 6–1
2018	(Poland) Maja Chwalińska (Poland) Daria Kuczer	(Poland) Martyna Kubka (Poland) Stefania Rogozińska Dzik	3–6, 7–6^{(7–5)}, [10–1]
2017	(Australia) Priscilla Hon (Belarus) Vera Lapko	(Poland) Katarzyna Kawa (Poland) Katarzyna Piter	7–6^{(7–3)}, 6–4
2016	Not held		
2015	(Netherlands) Kiki Bertens (Netherlands) Richèl Hogenkamp	(Sweden) Cornelia Lister (Latvia) Jeļena Ostapenko	7–6^{(7–2)}, 6–4
2014	(Czech Republic) Barbora Krejčíková (Serbia) Aleksandra Krunić	(Ukraine) Anastasiya Vasylyeva (Ukraine) Maryna Zanevska	3–6, 6–0, [10–6]
2009–13	Not held		
2008	(Germany) Angelique Kerber (Poland) Urszula Radwańska	(Poland) Olga Brózda (Poland) Sandra Zaniewska	6–3, 6–2
