= Sobota, Greater Poland Voivodeship =

Sobota
- Village
- Location within Poland
- Coordinates: 52°31′N 16°48′E
- Country: Poland
- Voivodeship: Greater Poland
- County: Poznań
- Gmina: Rokietnica
- Population: 200

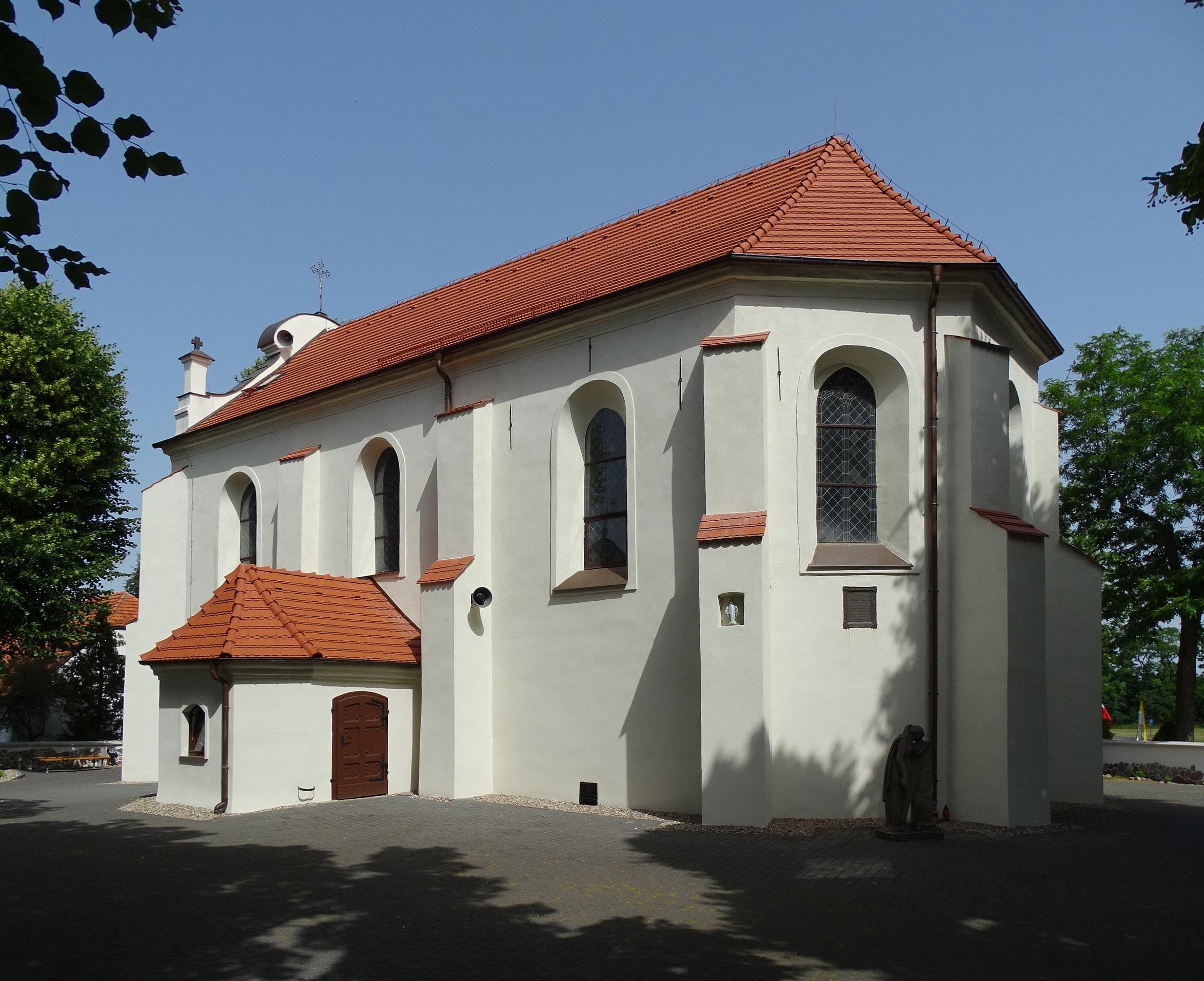
Parish church.

Sobota [sɔˈbɔta] is a village in the administrative district of Gmina Rokietnica, within Poznań County, Greater Poland Voivodeship, in west-central Poland.
