= Richèl Hogenkamp =

Dutch tennis player (born 1992)

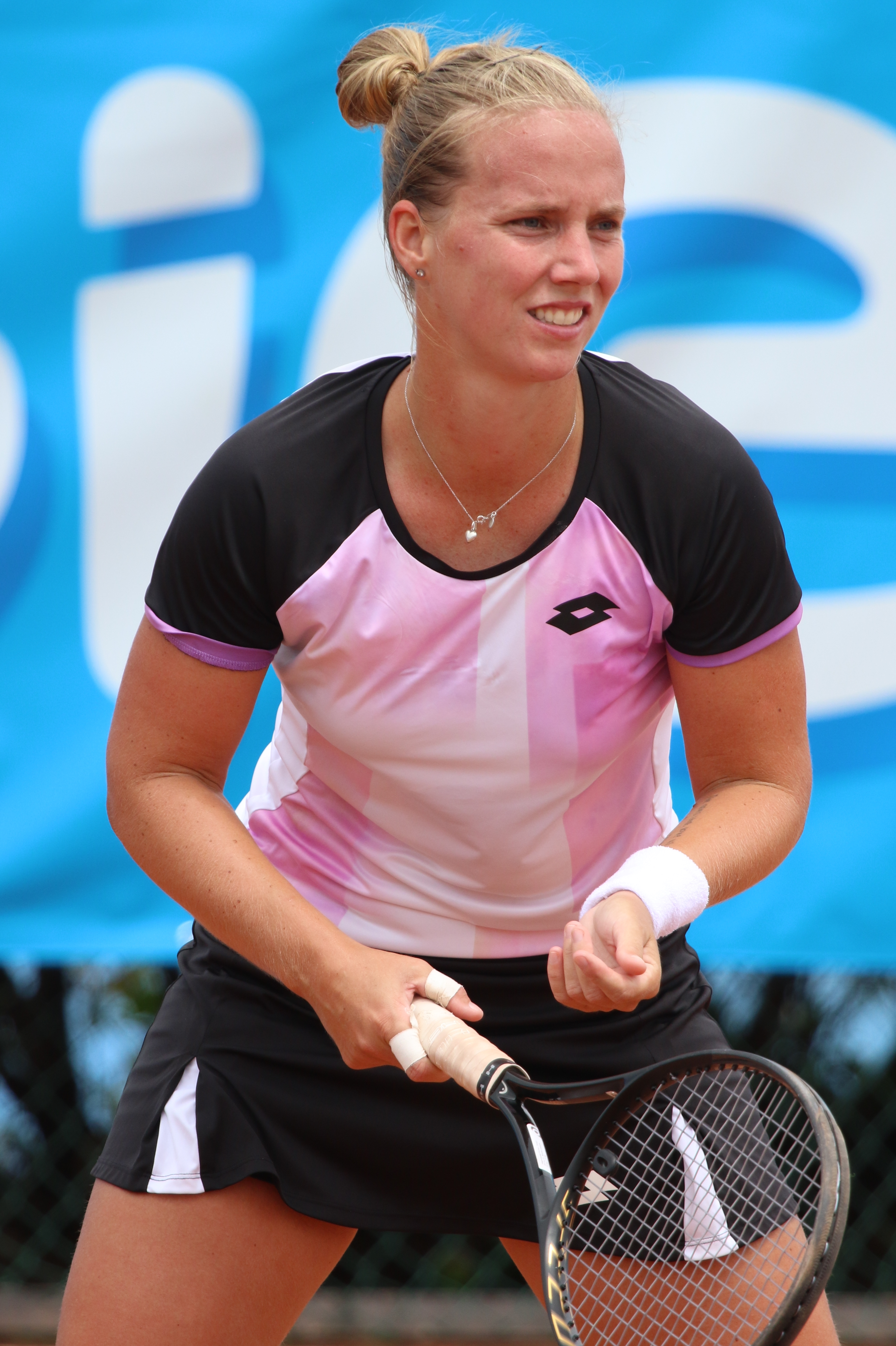
- Hogenkamp at the 2021 Open de Biarritz
- Country (sports): Netherlands
- Residence: Doetinchem, Netherlands
- Born: 16 April 1992 (age 34) Doetinchem
- Height: 1.68 m (5 ft 6 in)
- Turned pro: 2009
- Plays: Right (two-handed backhand)
- Coach: Kees Oostrom
- Prize money: $1,199,029

Singles
- Career record: 424–281
- Career titles: 16 ITF
- Highest ranking: No. 94 (24 July 2017)

Grand Slam singles results
- Australian Open: 1R (2015, 2018)
- French Open: 2R (2017)
- Wimbledon: 2R (2015)
- US Open: 2R (2016)

Doubles
- Career record: 129–86
- Career titles: 14 ITF
- Highest ranking: No. 147 (27 August 2012)

Team competitions
- Fed Cup: 16–11

Richèl Hogenkamp (born 16 April 1992) is a 33-year-old Dutch former professional tennis player. Her highest WTA singles ranking is 94, which she reached on 24 July 2017. On the ITF Circuit, she won 16 singles and 14 doubles titles.

== Personal background ==
Hogenkamp was born on 16 April 1992 to Benno and Jolanda in Doetinchem, where she continues to reside. She has a younger sister who rides horses professionally. Hogenkamp's grandparents introduced her to tennis. Hogenkamp is currently coached by Kees Oostrom. She is in a relationship with Dutch footballer Daphne van Kruistum.

== Career highlights ==
The biggest win of her career came at the 2012 Gastein Ladies where she beat top-seeded Julia Görges.

In a 2016 Fed Cup World Group tie, she defeated Svetlana Kuznetsova. The match lasted exactly four hours, the longest match in the history of Fed Cup.

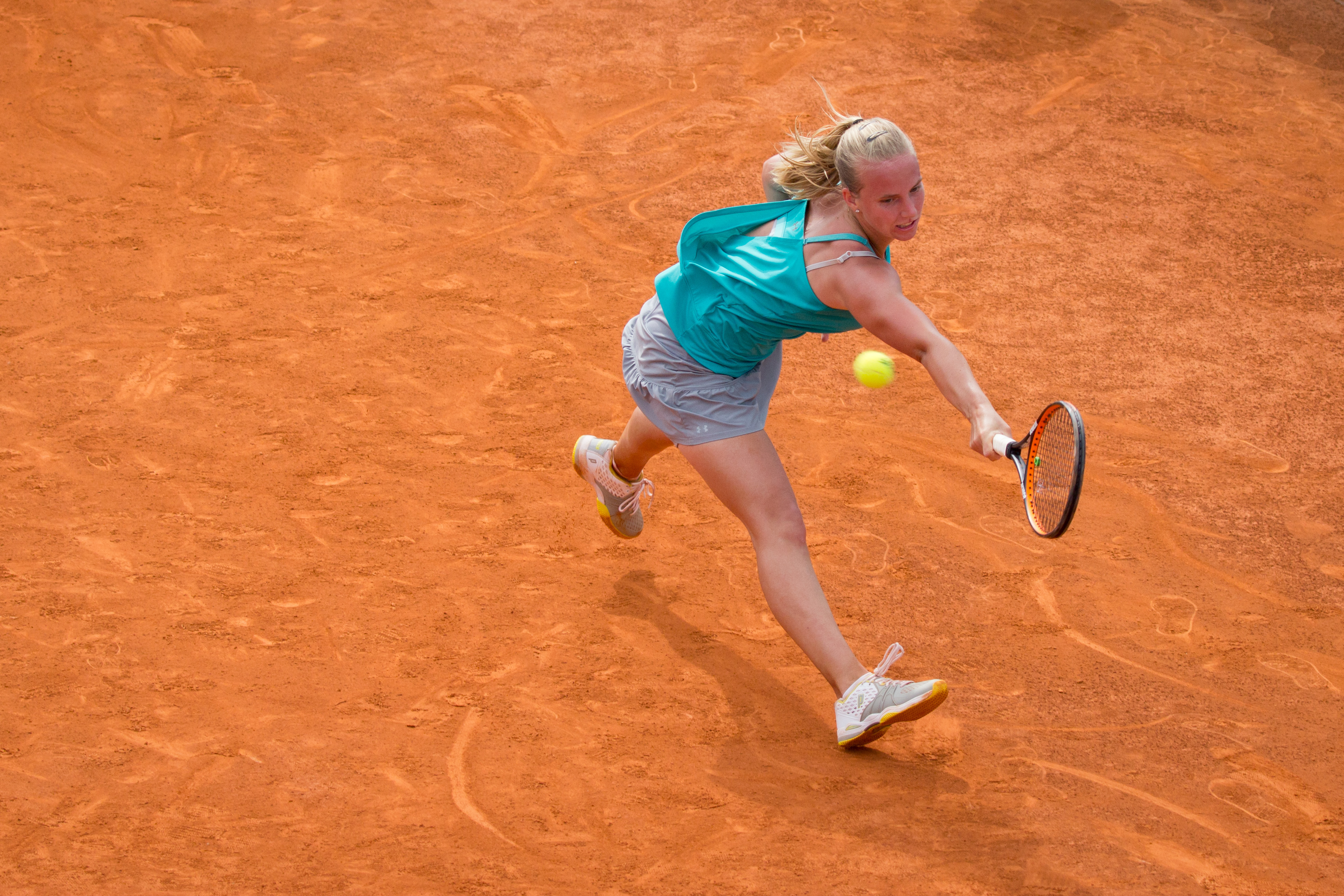
Hogenkamp at the 2015 Madrid Open

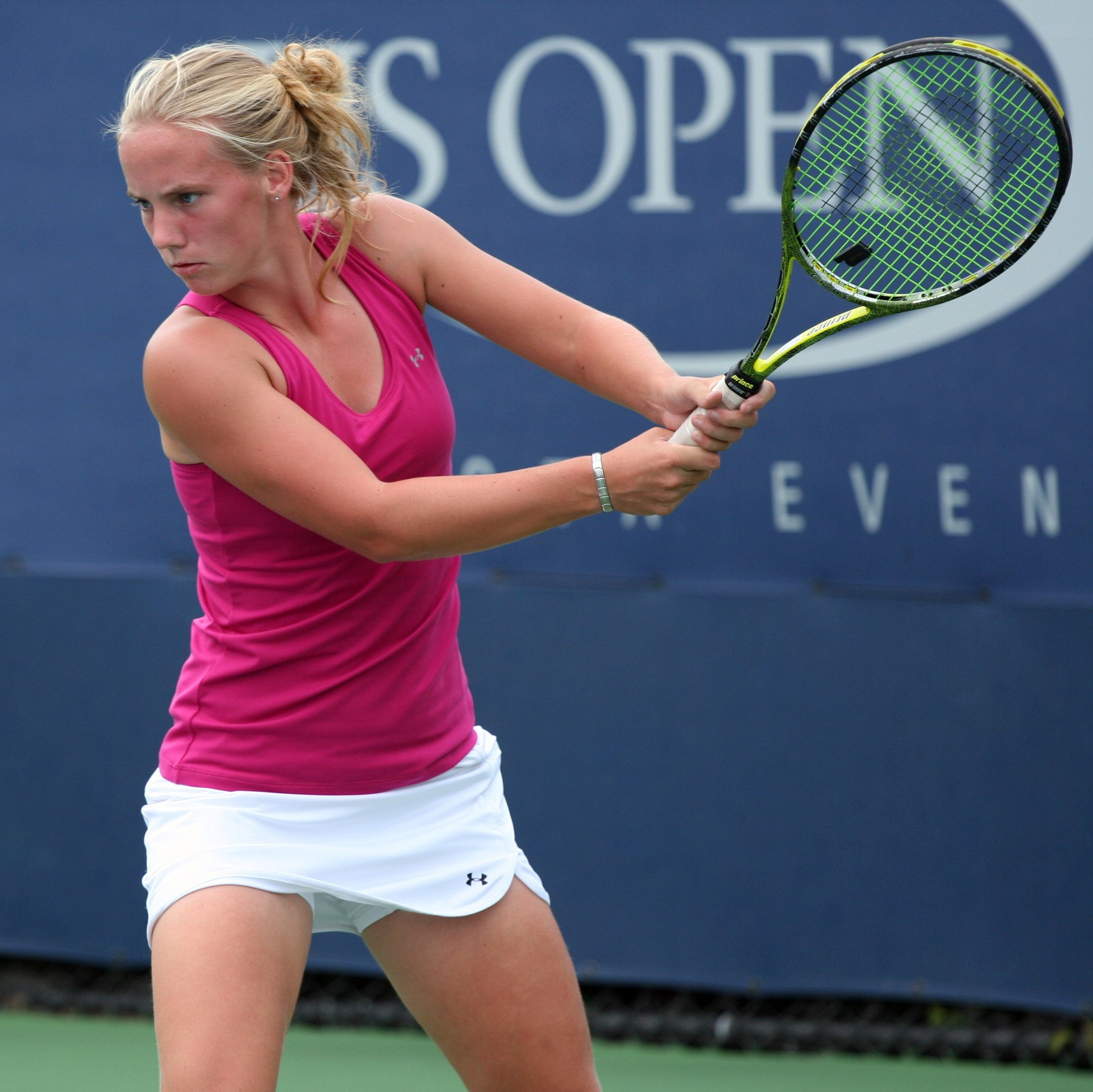
At the 2009 US Open

== Grand Slam singles performance timeline ==
Key
W	F	SF	QF	#R	RR	Q#	DNQ	A	NH

(W) winner; (F) finalist; (SF) semifinalist; (QF) quarterfinalist; (#R) rounds 4, 3, 2, 1; (RR) round-robin stage; (Q#) qualification round; (DNQ) did not qualify; (A) absent; (NH) not held; (SR) strike rate (events won / competed); (W–L) win–loss record.
To avoid confusion and double counting, these charts are updated at the conclusion of a tournament or when the player's participation has ended.

Tournament	2012	2013	2014	2015	2016	2017	2018	2019	2020	2021	2022	SR	W–L
Australian Open	A	A	Q1	1R	Q3	Q1	1R	Q3	Q1	Q1	Q3	0 / 2	0–2
French Open	A	A	Q1	Q1	Q2	2R	1R	Q2	Q3	Q2	Q1	0 / 2	1–2
Wimbledon	A	A	Q2	2R	Q1	1R	Q2	Q2	NH	Q1	A	0 / 2	1–2
US Open	Q1	Q2	Q3	Q1	2R	1R	A	1R	A	Q1	A	0 / 3	1–3
Win–loss	0–0	0–0	0–0	1–2	1–1	1–3	0–2	0–1	0–0	0–0	0–0	0 / 9	3–9

== ITF Circuit finals ==
=== Singles: 26 (16 titles, 10 runner-ups) ===
Legend $80,000 tournaments $50/60,000 tournaments $25,000 tournaments $10,000 tournaments	Finals by surface Hard (6–5) Clay (10–5)

Result	W–L	Date	Tournament	Tier	Surface	Opponent	Score
Win	1–0	Jun 2009	ITF Alkmaar, Netherlands	10,000	Clay	(Peru) Bianca Botto	7–6^{(5)}, 6–3
Win	2–0	Aug 2009	ITF Rebecq, Belgium	10,000	Clay	(France) Constance Sibille	4–6, 6–3, 6–4
Win	3–0	Aug 2009	ITF Enschede, Netherlands	10,000	Clay	(Netherlands) Angelique van der Meet	6–0, 6–3
Win	4–0	Aug 2010	ITF Almaty, Kazakhstan	25,000	Hard	(Georgia (country)) Sofia Shapatava	6–2, 6–3
Loss	4–1	Nov 2010	ITF Minsk, Belarus	25,000	Hard (i)	(Ukraine) Lesia Tsurenko	1–6, 6–3, 6–7^{(2)}
Win	5–1	Jan 2012	ITF Sutton, UK	10,000	Hard	(Republic of Ireland) Amy Bowtell	6–3, 6–2
Win	6–1	Nov 2012	ITF Istanbul, Turkey	25,000	Hard (i)	(Turkey) Çağla Büyükakçay	6–4, 6–3
Win	7–1	Aug 2013	ITF Koksijde, Belgium	25,000	Clay	(France) Irena Pavlovic	6–4, 6–1
Loss	7–2	Jun 2014	Bredeney Ladies Open, Germany	25,000	Clay	(Luxembourg) Mandy Minella	2–6, 6–4, 3–6
Loss	7–3	Jun 2014	Reinert Open, Germany	50,000	Clay	(Ukraine) Kateryna Kozlova	4–6, 7–6, 1–6
Loss	7–4	Aug 2014	ITF Koksijde, Belgium	25,000	Clay	(Ukraine) Maryna Zanevska	1–6, 1–6
Win	8–4	Sep 2014	ITF Clermont-Ferrand, France	25,000	Hard (i)	(France) Julie Coin	6–1, 6–3
Loss	8–5	Mar 2016	ITF Puebla, México	25,000	Hard (i)	(Russia) Irina Khromacheva	3–6, 2–6
Win	9–5	Aug 2016	ITF Koksijde, Belgium	25,000	Clay	(France) Océane Dodin	6–3, 4–6, 6–3
Win	10–5	Oct 2016	ITF Clermont-Ferrand, France	25,000	Hard (i)	(Italy) Jasmine Paolini	6–4, 6–2
Loss	10–6	Mar 2017	Open de Seine-et-Marne, France	60,000	Hard (i)	(Russia) Ekaterina Alexandrova	2–6, 7–6^{(3)}, 3–6
Win	11–6	Apr 2017	Nana Trophy Tunis, Tunisia	60,000	Clay	(North Macedonia) Lina Gjorcheska	7–5, 6–4
Win	12–6	May 2017	Open Saint-Gaudens, France	60,000	Clay	(United States) Kristie Ahn	6–2, 6–4
Loss	12–7	Aug 2017	ITF Leipzig, Germany	25,000	Clay	(Poland) Magdalena Fręch	2–6, 6–7^{(3)}
Loss	12–8	Nov 2017	Open Nantes Atlantique, France	25,000	Hard (i)	(Estonia) Kaia Kanepi	3–6, 4–6
Win	13–8	Jul 2018	Prague Open, Czech Republic	80,000	Clay	(Italy) Martina di Giuseppe	6–4, 6–2
Win	14–8	Aug 2018	ITF Koksijde, Belgium	25,000	Clay	(Czech Republic) Miriam Kolodziejová	6–4, 6–1
Loss	14–9	Jun 2019	ITF Ystad, Sweden	W25	Clay	(Montenegro) Danka Kovinić	6–2, 3–6, 3–6
Win	15–9	Aug 2019	ITF Koksijde, Belgium	W25	Clay	(France) Océane Dodin	4–6, 6–1, 6–4
Win	16–9	Sep 2021	ITF Johannesburg, South Africa	W25	Hard	(Zimbabwe) Valeria Bhunu	6–3, 4–6, 6–3
Loss	16–10	Sep 2021	ITF Johannesburg, South Africa	W25	Hard	(Russia) Alina Charaeva	0–2 ret.

=== Doubles: 22 (14 titles, 8 runner-ups) ===
Legend $100,000 tournaments $75,000 tournaments $60,000 tournaments $25,000 tournaments $10,000 tournaments	Finals by surface Hard (4–3) Clay (10–5)

Result	W–L	Date	Tournament	Tier	Surface	Partner	Opponents	Score
Win	1–0	Jun 2009	ITF Apeldoorn, Netherlands	10,000	Clay	(Netherlands) Nicolette van Uitert	(Serbia and Montenegro) Neda Kozić (Netherlands) Bibiane Schoofs	6–3, 6–7^{(9)}, [10–8]
Loss	1–1	Jun 2009	ITF Alkmaar, Netherlands	10,000	Clay	(Netherlands) Nicolette van Uitert	(Peru) Bianca Botto (France) Cindy Chala	7–6^{(4)}, 3–6, [10–2]
Win	2–1	Jul 2010	ITF Zwevegem, Belgium	25,000	Clay	(Russia) Valeria Savinykh	(Russia) Irina Khromacheva (Ukraine) Maryna Zanevska	6–3, 3–6, [10–7]
Win	3–1	Sep 2010	ITF Helsinki, Finland	25,000	Hard (i)	(Netherlands) Kiki Bertens	(Ukraine) Yuliya Beygelzimer (France) Kristina Mladenovic	6–3, 7–5
Loss	3–2	Jan 2011	Open Andrézieux, France	25,000	Hard	(Netherlands) Kiki Bertens	(Croatia) Darija Jurak (Russia) Valeria Savinykh	6–3, 7–6^{(0)}
Win	4–2	Jul 2011	ITF Cáceres, Spain	25,000	Hard	(Portugal) Maria João Koehler	(France) Victoria Larrière (France) Irena Pavlovic	6–4, 6–4
Win	5–2	Nov 2011	ITF Benicarló, Spain	25,000	Clay	(Spain) Inés Ferrer Suárez	(Russia) Ekaterina Ivanova (Bulgaria) Aleksandrina Naydenova	7–6^{(6)}, 6–4
Loss	5–3	Nov 2011	ITF Rosario, Argentina	25,000	Clay	(Spain) Inés Ferrer Suárez	(Argentina) Mailen Auroux (Argentina) María Irigoyen	4–6, 6–1, 6–3
Win	6–3	Dec 2011	ITF Santiago, Chile	25,000	Clay	(Spain) Inés Ferrer Suárez	(Argentina) Mailen Auroux (Argentina) María Irigoyen	6–4, 3–6, [10–5]
Loss	6–4	Apr 2012	ITF Tunis, Tunisia	25,000	Clay	(Spain) Inés Ferrer Suárez	(Romania) Elena Bogdan (Romania) Raluca Olaru	4–6, 3–6
Win	7–4	Jul 2012	ITS Cup Olomouc, Czech Republic	100,000	Clay	(Spain) Inés Ferrer Suárez	(Ukraine) Yuliya Beygelzimer (Czech Republic) Renata Voráčová	6–2, 7–6^{(4)}
Loss	7–5	Oct 2012	ITF Sant Cugat del Valles, Spain	25,000	Clay	(Spain) Inés Ferrer Suárez	(Spain) Leticia Costas (Spain) Arantxa Parra Santonja	3–6, 3–6
Loss	7–6	Apr 2013	ITF Edgbaston, United Kingdom	25,000	Hard (i)	(Liechtenstein) Stephanie Vogt	(Germany) Kristina Barrois (Croatia) Ana Vrljić	4–6, 6–7^{(2)}
Win	8–6	Aug 2014	ITF Koksijde, Belgium	25,000	Clay	(Belgium) Ysaline Bonaventure	(United States) Bernarda Pera (Netherlands) Demi Schuurs	6–4, 6–4
Loss	8–7	Sep 2014	ITF Alphen aan den Rijn, Netherlands	25,000	Clay	(Netherlands) Lesley Kerkhove	(Sweden) Rebecca Peterson (Netherlands) Eva Wacanno	4–6, 4–6
Win	9–7	Sep 2014	GB Pro-Series Shrewsbury, UK	25,000	Hard (i)	(Netherlands) Lesley Kerkhove	(Germany) Nicola Geuer (Switzerland) Viktorija Golubic	2–6, 7–5, [10–8]
Win	10–7	Jul 2015	Powiat Poznański Open, Poland	75,000	Clay	(Netherlands) Kiki Bertens	(Sweden) Cornelia Lister (Latvia) Jeļena Ostapenko	7–6^{(2)}, 6–4
Win	11–7	Jul 2016	ITF Horb, Germany	25,000	Clay	(Netherlands) Lesley Kerkhove	(Bosnia and Herzegovina) Anita Husarić (Ukraine) Oleksandra Korashvili	6–1, 7–6^{(2)}
Win	12–7	Oct 2019	ITF İstanbul, Turkey	W25	Hard (i)	(Netherlands) Lesley Pattinama Kerkhove	(Switzerland) Susan Bandecchi (Poland) Katarzyna Piter	6–2, 2–6, [10–6]
Loss	12–8	Mar 2021	ITF Buenos Aires, Argentina	W25	Hard (i)	(Greece) Valentini Grammatikopoulou	(Russia) Amina Anshba (Hungary) Panna Udvardy	5–7, 2–6
Win	13–8	Mar 2021	ITF Villa María, Argentina	W25	Clay	(Greece) Valentini Grammatikopoulou	(Argentina) Victoria Bosio (Argentina) María Carlé	6–2, 6–2
Win	14–8	Jun 2021	Macha Lake Open, Czech Republic	W60	Clay	(Greece) Valentini Grammatikopoulou	(Russia) Amina Anshba (Czech Republic) Anastasia Dețiuc	6–3, 6–4
