= 2018 French Open – Men's singles qualifying =

Men's singles qualifying
- 2018 French Open

Events
Singles	men	women		boys	girls
Doubles	men	women	mixed	boys	girls
WC Singles	men	women	quad
WC Doubles	men	women	quad
Legends	−45	45+	women

Qualification
Singles	men	women
- French Open

The 2018 French Open – Men's Singles Qualifying was a series of tennis matches which took place 21 May 2018 to 25 May 2018 to determine the sixteen qualifiers into the main draw of the 2018 French Open – Men's singles. Eight competitors also qualified as lucky losers.

== Seeds ==
1. (Japan) Taro Daniel (second round)
2. (Belarus) Ilya Ivashka (qualified)
3. (Belgium) Ruben Bemelmans (qualifying competition, lucky loser)
4. (Austria) Gerald Melzer (first round)
5. (Brazil) Thiago Monteiro (first round)
6. (Brazil) Rogério Dutra Silva (qualified)
7. (United States) Denis Kudla (qualified)
8. (Spain) Adrián Menéndez Maceiras (first round)
9. (Argentina) Guido Andreozzi (qualified)
10. (Slovakia) Martin Kližan (qualified)
11. (United States) Tim Smyczek (first round)
12. (India) Ramkumar Ramanathan (first round)
13. (Sweden) Elias Ymer (qualified)
14. (Canada) Peter Polansky (qualifying competition, lucky loser)
15. (Germany) Yannick Hanfmann (second round)
16. (Germany) Yannick Maden (first round)
17. (Portugal) Pedro Sousa (second round)
18. (Ukraine) Sergiy Stakhovsky (qualifying competition, lucky loser)
19. (United States) Donald Young (first round)
20. (Italy) Simone Bolelli (qualifying competition, lucky loser)
21. (France) Quentin Halys (first round)
22. (Bolivia) Hugo Dellien (second round)
23. (Spain) Marcel Granollers (first round)
24. (Estonia) Jürgen Zopp (qualifying competition, lucky loser)
25. (Argentina) Carlos Berlocq (second round)
26. (Italy) Lorenzo Sonego (second round)
27. (Kazakhstan) Alexander Bublik (first round)
28. (Switzerland) Henri Laaksonen (second round)
29. (Austria) Sebastian Ofner (first round)
30. (Russia) Alexey Vatutin (first round)
31. (Italy) Stefano Travaglia (second round)
32. (El Salvador) Marcelo Arévalo (second round)

== Qualifiers ==
1. (Czech Republic) Adam Pavlásek
2. (Belarus) Ilya Ivashka
3. (Brazil) Thomaz Bellucci
4. (Latvia) Ernests Gulbis
5. (Norway) Casper Ruud
6. (Brazil) Rogério Dutra Silva
7. (United States) Denis Kudla
8. (Colombia) Santiago Giraldo
9. (Argentina) Guido Andreozzi
10. (Slovakia) Martin Kližan
11. (Spain) Jaume Munar
12. (Australia) Bernard Tomic
13. (Sweden) Elias Ymer
14. (Slovakia) Jozef Kovalík
15. (Poland) Hubert Hurkacz
16. (Spain) Carlos Taberner

== Lucky losers ==
1. (Ukraine) Sergiy Stakhovsky
2. (Canada) Peter Polansky
3. (Estonia) Jürgen Zopp
4. (Germany) Oscar Otte
5. (Italy) Simone Bolelli
6. (Belgium) Ruben Bemelmans
7. (Egypt) Mohamed Safwat
8. (Argentina) Marco Trungelliti

== Draw ==
=== First qualifier ===
First round
1	(Japan) Taro Daniel	6	4	6
(Dominican Republic) Víctor Estrella Burgos	4	6	0
(United States) Evan King	0	3
(Austria) Dennis Novak	6	6
(Czech Republic) Adam Pavlásek	6	0
(Slovenia) Blaž Kavčič	3	0^{r}
PR	(Ukraine) Illya Marchenko	4	2
22	(Bolivia) Hugo Dellien	6	6

Second round
1	(Japan) Taro Daniel	6	1	0
(Austria) Dennis Novak	4	6	6
(Czech Republic) Adam Pavlásek	6	6
22	(Bolivia) Hugo Dellien	3	1

Qualifying competition
(Austria) Dennis Novak	6^{8}	4
(Czech Republic) Adam Pavlásek	7^{10}	6

=== Second qualifier ===
First round
2	(Belarus) Ilya Ivashka	7	7
(Portugal) João Domingues	5	5
(Croatia) Viktor Galović	7^{11}	6
(France) Kenny de Schepper	6^{9}	3
(Canada) Filip Peliwo	5	2
(France) Constant Lestienne	7	6
PR	(Belarus) Egor Gerasimov	3	6	6^{4}
18	(Ukraine) Sergiy Stakhovsky	6	1	7^{7}

Second round
2	(Belarus) Ilya Ivashka	6	7^{7}
(Croatia) Viktor Galović	2	6^{5}
(France) Constant Lestienne	7^{9}	5	2
18	(Ukraine) Sergiy Stakhovsky	6^{7}	7	6

Qualifying competition
2	(Belarus) Ilya Ivashka	6	6^{5}	6
18	(Ukraine) Sergiy Stakhovsky	4	7^{7}	2

=== Third qualifier ===
First round
3	(Belgium) Ruben Bemelmans	6	6^{6}	6
WC	(France) Ugo Humbert	4	7^{8}	3
(Poland) Kamil Majchrzak	4	3
(Croatia) Nino Serdarušić	6	6
(Germany) Matthias Bachinger	3	4
(Brazil) Thomaz Bellucci	6	6
(Spain) Daniel Gimeno Traver	6	6
29	(Austria) Sebastian Ofner	4	4

Second round
3	(Belgium) Ruben Bemelmans	6	6
(Croatia) Nino Serdarušić	2	3
(Brazil) Thomaz Bellucci	6	7^{9}
(Spain) Daniel Gimeno Traver	1	6^{7}

Qualifying competition
3	(Belgium) Ruben Bemelmans	2	6	5
(Brazil) Thomaz Bellucci	6	2	7

=== Fourth qualifier ===
First round
4	(Austria) Gerald Melzer	6^{2}	2
(Italy) Alessandro Giannessi	7^{7}	6
(Germany) Tobias Kamke	6	6
(Australia) Alex Bolt	2	4
(Latvia) Ernests Gulbis	7	6
(France) Stéphane Robert	5	4
(Spain) Enrique López Pérez	4	3
31	(Italy) Stefano Travaglia	6	6

Second round
(Italy) Alessandro Giannessi	7^{7}	6
(Germany) Tobias Kamke	6^{2}	2
(Latvia) Ernests Gulbis	6	6^{7}	6
31	(Italy) Stefano Travaglia	3	7^{9}	1

Qualifying competition
(Italy) Alessandro Giannessi	6	4	2
(Latvia) Ernests Gulbis	4	6	6

=== Fifth qualifier ===
First round
5	(Brazil) Thiago Monteiro	3	3
(Norway) Casper Ruud	6	6
(France) Benjamin Bonzi	6^{3}	6	6^{1}
(Colombia) Daniel Elahi Galán	7^{7}	4	7^{7}
(Australia) Akira Santillan	6	6
(Japan) Go Soeda	2	2
WC	(France) Alexandre Müller	7^{9}	6
19	(United States) Donald Young	6^{7}	3

Second round
(Norway) Casper Ruud	6	6
(Colombia) Daniel Elahi Galán	2	4
(Australia) Akira Santillan	1	6	0
WC	(France) Alexandre Müller	6	3	6

Qualifying competition
(Norway) Casper Ruud	6	6
WC	(France) Alexandre Müller	1	3

=== Sixth qualifier ===
First round
6	(Brazil) Rogério Dutra Silva	7^{8}	6
(Chile) Christian Garín	6^{6}	4
(United States) Kevin King	2	5
(Slovakia) Andrej Martin	6	7
(United Kingdom) Liam Broady	6^{8}	6^{4}
(Czech Republic) Zdeněk Kolář	7^{10}	7^{7}
(Italy) Stefano Napolitano	6	6
23	(Spain) Marcel Granollers	4	1

Second round
6	(Brazil) Rogério Dutra Silva	6	6
(Slovakia) Andrej Martin	2	0
(Czech Republic) Zdeněk Kolář	6	6
(Italy) Stefano Napolitano	3	3

Qualifying competition
6	(Brazil) Rogério Dutra Silva	6	6
(Czech Republic) Zdeněk Kolář	0	4

=== Seventh qualifier ===
First round
7	(United States) Denis Kudla	6	6^{1}	7
(Brazil) Guilherme Clezar	3	7^{7}	5
(United States) Ernesto Escobedo	4	6	2
WC	(France) Geoffrey Blancaneaux	6	4	6
WC	(France) Jaimee Floyd Angele	6	3	1
(Australia) Thanasi Kokkinakis	1	6	6
WC	(France) Hugo Gaston	7	4	2
24	(Estonia) Jürgen Zopp	5	6	6

Second round
7	(United States) Denis Kudla	6	6
WC	(France) Geoffrey Blancaneaux	2	1
(Australia) Thanasi Kokkinakis	7^{7}	1	2
24	(Estonia) Jürgen Zopp	6^{4}	6	6

Qualifying competition
7	(United States) Denis Kudla	6	6
24	(Estonia) Jürgen Zopp	2	1

=== Eighth qualifier ===
First round
8	(Spain) Adrián Menéndez Maceiras	2	4
PR	(Colombia) Santiago Giraldo	6	6
(Belarus) Uladzimir Ignatik	5	7^{7}	6
(Australia) Marc Polmans	7	6^{4}	2
(United States) Stefan Kozlov	4	5
(Japan) Yasutaka Uchiyama	6	7
(Spain) Tommy Robredo	4	4
20	(Italy) Simone Bolelli	6	6

Second round
PR	(Colombia) Santiago Giraldo	6^{5}	6	6
(Belarus) Uladzimir Ignatik	7^{7}	2	2
(Japan) Yasutaka Uchiyama	6^{4}	4
20	(Italy) Simone Bolelli	7^{7}	6

Qualifying competition
PR	(Colombia) Santiago Giraldo	6	6
20	(Italy) Simone Bolelli	0	2

=== Ninth qualifier ===
First round
9	(Argentina) Guido Andreozzi	6	6
(Germany) Dustin Brown	2	4
(Australia) John-Patrick Smith	3	6	4
WC	(France) Corentin Denolly	6	4	6
(Egypt) Mohamed Safwat	6	6^{2}	6
(Slovenia) Blaž Rola	4	7^{7}	4
(United States) Bradley Klahn	6	6^{3}	4
28	(Switzerland) Henri Laaksonen	4	7^{7}	6

Second round
9	(Argentina) Guido Andreozzi	7	6
WC	(France) Corentin Denolly	5	2
(Egypt) Mohamed Safwat	6	6
28	(Switzerland) Henri Laaksonen	1	4

Qualifying competition
9	(Argentina) Guido Andreozzi	6	6
(Egypt) Mohamed Safwat	4	4

=== Tenth qualifier ===
First round
10	(Slovakia) Martin Kližan	4	6	6
(India) Sumit Nagal	6	4	1
(Hungary) Attila Balázs	2	6	3
(Serbia) Miomir Kecmanović	6	3	6
(Argentina) Juan Ignacio Londero	6	6
(Serbia) Nikola Milojević	4	3
(Argentina) Andrea Collarini	4	7^{7}	6
21	(France) Quentin Halys	6	6^{4}	4

Second round
10	(Slovakia) Martin Kližan	6^{1}	7^{7}	6
(Serbia) Miomir Kecmanović	7^{7}	6^{5}	3
(Argentina) Juan Ignacio Londero	6	6
(Argentina) Andrea Collarini	2	3

Qualifying competition
10	(Slovakia) Martin Kližan	6	4	7^{7}
(Argentina) Juan Ignacio Londero	4	6	6^{5}

=== Eleventh qualifier ===
First round
11	(United States) Tim Smyczek	3	5
(Spain) Jaume Munar	6	7
(Canada) Félix Auger-Aliassime	6	6
(South Africa) Lloyd Harris	4	3
(United States) Dennis Novikov	2	2
(South Korea) Lee Duck-hee	6	6
(Chinese Taipei) Jason Jung	2	4
26	(Italy) Lorenzo Sonego	6	6

Second round
(Spain) Jaume Munar	6	6
(Canada) Félix Auger-Aliassime	3	3
(South Korea) Lee Duck-hee	6	6
26	(Italy) Lorenzo Sonego	3	4

Qualifying competition
(Spain) Jaume Munar	6^{3}	6	7^{7}
(South Korea) Lee Duck-hee	7^{7}	0	6^{1}

=== Twelfth qualifier ===
First round
12	(India) Ramkumar Ramanathan	3	7	1
(United Kingdom) Jay Clarke	6	5	6
(Australia) Bernard Tomic	7^{7}	6
(Barbados) Darian King	6^{4}	0
(Portugal) Gonçalo Oliveira	6	7
(Australia) Jason Kubler	2	5
(Germany) Jan Choinski	7	6
27	(Kazakhstan) Alexander Bublik	5	4

Second round
(United Kingdom) Jay Clarke	3	1
(Australia) Bernard Tomic	6	6
(Portugal) Gonçalo Oliveira	6	1	6
(Germany) Jan Choinski	4	6	1

Qualifying competition
(Australia) Bernard Tomic	7^{7}	7
(Portugal) Gonçalo Oliveira	6^{5}	5

=== Thirteenth qualifier ===
First round
13	(Sweden) Elias Ymer	0	7	6
(Kazakhstan) Aleksandr Nedovyesov	6	5	1
(Argentina) Facundo Bagnis	7	6
(Spain) Ricardo Ojeda Lara	5	1
(Italy) Salvatore Caruso	4	4
(India) Prajnesh Gunneswaran	6	6
(Spain) Pedro Martínez	6	6^{4}	4
32	(El Salvador) Marcelo Arévalo	4	7^{7}	6

Second round
13	(Sweden) Elias Ymer	6	6^{4}	6
(Argentina) Facundo Bagnis	2	7^{7}	2
(India) Prajnesh Gunneswaran	6	6
32	(El Salvador) Marcelo Arévalo	4	1

Qualifying competition
13	(Sweden) Elias Ymer	6	6
(India) Prajnesh Gunneswaran	3	4

=== Fourteenth qualifier ===
First round
14	(Canada) Peter Polansky	2	7^{7}	6
(Slovakia) Norbert Gombos	6	6^{3}	2
(Serbia) Peđa Krstin	6	6
WC	(France) Evan Furness	3	1
(United States) Reilly Opelka	7	6
(Netherlands) Tallon Griekspoor	5	3
(Slovakia) Jozef Kovalík	2	6	6
30	(Russia) Alexey Vatutin	6	1	3

Second round
14	(Canada) Peter Polansky	6	6
(Serbia) Peđa Krstin	4	2
(United States) Reilly Opelka	2	6	6^{4}
(Slovakia) Jozef Kovalík	6	3	7^{7}

Qualifying competition
14	(Canada) Peter Polansky	6^{1}	6^{3}
(Slovakia) Jozef Kovalík	7^{7}	7^{7}

=== Fifteenth qualifier ===
First round
15	(Germany) Yannick Hanfmann	7^{7}	7
(United States) Christopher Eubanks	6^{4}	5
WC	(France) Hugo Grenier	1	4
(Poland) Hubert Hurkacz	6	6
(Argentina) Marco Trungelliti	6	7
(Argentina) Renzo Olivo	3	5
(Germany) Mats Moraing	4	7	4
17	(Portugal) Pedro Sousa	6	5	6

Second round
15	(Germany) Yannick Hanfmann	6^{1}	6^{4}
(Poland) Hubert Hurkacz	7^{7}	7^{7}
(Argentina) Marco Trungelliti	6	7^{7}
17	(Portugal) Pedro Sousa	4	6^{4}

Qualifying competition
(Poland) Hubert Hurkacz	6	4	6
(Argentina) Marco Trungelliti	3	6	4

=== Sixteenth qualifier ===
First round
16	(Germany) Yannick Maden	1	5
(Spain) Carlos Taberner	6	7
PR	(Austria) Jürgen Melzer	6	4	6
(France) Gleb Sakharov	2	6	1
(Germany) Oscar Otte	6	6
WC	(France) Johan Tatlot	2	2
(France) Antoine Hoang	4	7	4
25	(Argentina) Carlos Berlocq	6	5	6

Second round
(Spain) Carlos Taberner	3	7^{7}	6
PR	(Austria) Jürgen Melzer	6	6^{1}	3
(Germany) Oscar Otte	6	2	6
25	(Argentina) Carlos Berlocq	3	6	4

Qualifying competition
(Spain) Carlos Taberner	6	2	6
(Germany) Oscar Otte	2	6	4
