= 2018 French Open – Women's singles qualifying =

Women's singles qualifying
- 2018 French Open

Events
Singles	men	women		boys	girls
Doubles	men	women	mixed	boys	girls
WC Singles	men	women	quad
WC Doubles	men	women	quad
Legends	−45	45+	women

Qualification
Singles	men	women
- French Open

The 2018 French Open – Women's singles qualifying was a series of tennis matches that took place from 22 May 2018 to 25 May 2018 to determine the twelve qualifiers into the main draw of the 2018 French Open – Women's singles. Two competitors also qualified as lucky losers.

== Seeds ==
1. (Belarus) Vera Lapko (first round)
2. (Sweden) Rebecca Peterson (qualified)
3. (Netherlands) Arantxa Rus (qualifying competition, lucky loser)
4. (Russia) Anna Blinkova (second round)
5. (Croatia) Jana Fett (first round)
6. (Switzerland) Viktorija Golubic (qualified)
7. (Colombia) Mariana Duque Mariño (qualified)
8. (United States) Nicole Gibbs (second round)
9. (Montenegro) Danka Kovinić (first round)
10. (Russia) Evgeniya Rodina (qualifying competition)
11. (Spain) Sara Sorribes Tormo (second round)
12. (Japan) Nao Hibino (first round)
13. (Slovenia) Dalila Jakupović (qualifying competition, lucky loser)
14. (Slovenia) Tamara Zidanšek (second round)
15. (Australia) Arina Rodionova (first round)
16. (Canada) Françoise Abanda (first round)
17. (United States) Caroline Dolehide (qualified)
18. (Ukraine) Anhelina Kalinina (second round)
19. (United States) Kristie Ahn (first round)
20. (Italy) Jasmine Paolini (first round)
21. (Belgium) Ysaline Bonaventure (qualifying competition)
22. (Netherlands) Richèl Hogenkamp (qualified)
23. (Canada) Carol Zhao (first round)
24. (Russia) Sofya Zhuk (first round)

== Qualifiers ==
1. (Netherlands) Richèl Hogenkamp
2. (Sweden) Rebecca Peterson
3. (Italy) Deborah Chiesa
4. (United States) Caroline Dolehide
5. (Poland) Magdalena Fręch
6. (Switzerland) Viktorija Golubic
7. (Colombia) Mariana Duque Mariño
8. (Czech Republic) Barbora Krejčíková
9. (Spain) Georgina García Pérez
10. (Italy) Francesca Schiavone
11. (United States) Grace Min
12. (Romania) Alexandra Dulgheru

== Lucky losers ==
1. (Netherlands) Arantxa Rus
2. (Slovenia) Dalila Jakupović

== Draw ==
=== First qualifier ===
First round
1	(Belarus) Vera Lapko	4	5
(Canada) Bianca Andreescu	6	7
(Chile) Daniela Seguel	1	3
(Bulgaria) Viktoriya Tomova	6	6
(Tunisia) Ons Jabeur	6	2	6
(Bulgaria) Sesil Karatantcheva	1	6	2
(Japan) Miharu Imanishi	2	0
22	(Netherlands) Richèl Hogenkamp	6	6

Second round
(Canada) Bianca Andreescu	6	6
(Bulgaria) Viktoriya Tomova	1	3
(Tunisia) Ons Jabeur	6^{7}	7	5
22	(Netherlands) Richèl Hogenkamp	7^{9}	5	7

Qualifying competition
(Canada) Bianca Andreescu	3	6^{9}
22	(Netherlands) Richèl Hogenkamp	6	7^{11}

=== Second qualifier ===
First round
2	(Sweden) Rebecca Peterson	6	6
(Japan) Misaki Doi	3	0
(United States) Francesca Di Lorenzo	2	7^{7}	6
PR	(Netherlands) Quirine Lemoine	6	6^{1}	4
(Belgium) Maryna Zanevska	7	3	7
(Romania) Alexandra Cadanțu	5	6	5
(Czech Republic) Tereza Martincová	6	6^{4}	1
21	(Belgium) Ysaline Bonaventure	1	7^{7}	6

Second round
2	(Sweden) Rebecca Peterson	6	6
(United States) Francesca Di Lorenzo	2	4
(Belgium) Maryna Zanevska	2	5
21	(Belgium) Ysaline Bonaventure	6	7

Qualifying competition
2	(Sweden) Rebecca Peterson	4	6	6
21	(Belgium) Ysaline Bonaventure	6	1	0

=== Third qualifier ===
First round
3	(Netherlands) Arantxa Rus	6	6
WC	(France) Manon Arcangioli	3	0
(Austria) Julia Grabher	5
(Russia) Polina Monova	2^{r}
(Italy) Deborah Chiesa	0	6	6
(Australia) Priscilla Hon	6	2	4
(Mexico) Renata Zarazúa	1	5
14	(Slovenia) Tamara Zidanšek	6	7

Second round
3	(Netherlands) Arantxa Rus	6	6
(Austria) Julia Grabher	3	3
(Italy) Deborah Chiesa	6	7
14	(Slovenia) Tamara Zidanšek	4	5

Qualifying competition
3	(Netherlands) Arantxa Rus	6^{5}	2
(Italy) Deborah Chiesa	7^{7}	6

=== Fourth qualifier ===
First round
4	(Russia) Anna Blinkova	6	6
(Turkey) Çağla Büyükakçay	3	2
(Romania) Irina Bara	6^{5}	6	6
WC	(France) Audrey Albié	7^{7}	1	4
(Czech Republic) Marie Bouzková	6	6
WC	(France) Tessah Andrianjafitrimo	4	2
(United States) Irina Falconi	4	3
17	(United States) Caroline Dolehide	6	6

Second round
4	(Russia) Anna Blinkova	6	4	1
(Romania) Irina Bara	4	6	6
(Czech Republic) Marie Bouzková	6	3	5
17	(United States) Caroline Dolehide	4	6	7

Qualifying competition
(Romania) Irina Bara	4	3
17	(United States) Caroline Dolehide	6	6

=== Fifth qualifier ===
First round
5	(Croatia) Jana Fett	6^{6}	6	5
WC	(France) Diane Parry	7^{8}	1	7
PR	(Slovakia) Rebecca Šramková	6	6
(Czech Republic) Karolína Muchová	4	4
(Austria) Barbara Haas	3	6^{7}
(Poland) Magdalena Fręch	6	7^{9}
(Russia) Vitalia Diatchenko	7^{7}	6
20	(Italy) Jasmine Paolini	6^{5}	4

Second round
WC	(France) Diane Parry	6^{6}	0
PR	(Slovakia) Rebecca Šramková	7^{8}	6
(Poland) Magdalena Fręch	6	6
(Russia) Vitalia Diatchenko	3	2

Qualifying competition
PR	(Slovakia) Rebecca Šramková	6	2	3
(Poland) Magdalena Fręch	4	6	6

=== Sixth qualifier ===
First round
6	(Switzerland) Viktorija Golubic	6	6
(Japan) Miyu Kato	4	3
WC	(France) Margot Yerolymos	6	7^{7}
(China) Lu Jiajing	2	6^{5}
(Russia) Anna Kalinskaya	6	6
(United States) Kayla Day	2	0
(Greece) Valentini Grammatikopoulou	6	1	7^{8}
24	(Russia) Sofya Zhuk	1	6	6^{6}

Second round
6	(Switzerland) Viktorija Golubic	6	6
WC	(France) Margot Yerolymos	1	3
(Russia) Anna Kalinskaya	3	6	6
(Greece) Valentini Grammatikopoulou	6	1	2

Qualifying competition
6	(Switzerland) Viktorija Golubic	3	7^{7}	6
(Russia) Anna Kalinskaya	6	6^{1}	4

=== Seventh qualifier ===
First round
7	(Colombia) Mariana Duque Mariño	7^{7}	7
(United Kingdom) Katie Boulter	6^{5}	5
(China) Lu Jingjing	5	0
(United Kingdom) Gabriella Taylor	7	6
(Australia) Olivia Rogowska	7	6^{5}	3
(Liechtenstein) Kathinka von Deichmann	5	7^{7}	6
(Canada) Eugenie Bouchard	0	1^{r}
13	(Slovenia) Dalila Jakupović	6	2

Second round
7	(Colombia) Mariana Duque Mariño	6	6
(United Kingdom) Gabriella Taylor	4	4
(Liechtenstein) Kathinka von Deichmann	7^{7}	6^{4}	3
13	(Slovenia) Dalila Jakupović	6^{5}	7^{7}	6

Qualifying competition
7	(Colombia) Mariana Duque Mariño	4	6	7
13	(Slovenia) Dalila Jakupović	6	1	5

=== Eighth qualifier ===
First round
8	(United States) Nicole Gibbs	6	6
(China) Han Xinyun	1	4
WC	(France) Sara Cakarevic	5	0
(Russia) Veronika Kudermetova	7	6
(Czech Republic) Barbora Krejčíková	6	6
WC	(France) Clara Burel	2	0
(United States) Danielle Lao	2	1
18	(Ukraine) Anhelina Kalinina	6	6

Second round
8	(United States) Nicole Gibbs	0	7	1
(Russia) Veronika Kudermetova	6	5	6
(Czech Republic) Barbora Krejčíková	3	6	6
18	(Ukraine) Anhelina Kalinina	6	3	3

Qualifying competition
(Russia) Veronika Kudermetova	2	2
(Czech Republic) Barbora Krejčíková	6	6

=== Ninth qualifier ===
First round
9	(Montenegro) Danka Kovinić	2	2
(United States) Claire Liu	6	6
(Russia) Valentyna Ivakhnenko	4	1
(Spain) Georgina García Pérez	6	6
(Australia) Destanee Aiava	6	3	3
(China) Liu Fangzhou	2	6	6
WC	(France) Harmony Tan	6	6
15	(Australia) Arina Rodionova	3	4

Second round
(United States) Claire Liu	5	6	6^{5}
(Spain) Georgina García Pérez	7	2	7^{7}
(China) Liu Fangzhou	4	2
WC	(France) Harmony Tan	6	6

Qualifying competition
(Spain) Georgina García Pérez	6	6
WC	(France) Harmony Tan	3	1

=== Tenth qualifier ===
First round
10	(Russia) Evgeniya Rodina	6	7^{7}
(India) Ankita Raina	3	6^{2}
(Uzbekistan) Sabina Sharipova	6	6
(Germany) Antonia Lottner	2	4
(United States) Jamie Loeb	6	6
(Switzerland) Conny Perrin	3	2
(Italy) Francesca Schiavone	6	3	6
23	(Canada) Carol Zhao	4	6	3

Second round
10	(Russia) Evgeniya Rodina	3	7	6
(Uzbekistan) Sabina Sharipova	6	5	0
(United States) Jamie Loeb	1	4
(Italy) Francesca Schiavone	6	6

Qualifying competition
10	(Russia) Evgeniya Rodina	0	1
(Italy) Francesca Schiavone	6	6

=== Eleventh qualifier ===
First round
11	(Spain) Sara Sorribes Tormo	6	6
(South Korea) Jang Su-jeong	1	0
(Switzerland) Jil Teichmann	4	6	2
(United States) Grace Min	6	3	6
(Ukraine) Marta Kostyuk	6	4	6
(Japan) Eri Hozumi	4	6	4
(Italy) Martina Trevisan	4	6	6
16	(Canada) Françoise Abanda	6	4	2

Second round
11	(Spain) Sara Sorribes Tormo	7	4	2
(United States) Grace Min	5	6	6
(Ukraine) Marta Kostyuk	3	3
(Italy) Martina Trevisan	6	6

Qualifying competition
(United States) Grace Min	1	6	6
(Italy) Martina Trevisan	6	4	3

=== Twelfth qualifier ===
First round
12	(Japan) Nao Hibino	3	6	3
(Romania) Alexandra Dulgheru	6	4	6
(Japan) Junri Namigata	4	6	3
(Australia) Lizette Cabrera	6	3	6
(Bulgaria) Elitsa Kostova	4	6	3
(Germany) Tamara Korpatsch	6	2	6
(Netherlands) Bibiane Schoofs	7^{7}	2	6
19	(United States) Kristie Ahn	6^{2}	6	3

Second round
(Romania) Alexandra Dulgheru	6	4	6
(Australia) Lizette Cabrera	4	6	0
(Germany) Tamara Korpatsch	6	7^{7}
(Netherlands) Bibiane Schoofs	4	6^{5}

Qualifying competition
(Romania) Alexandra Dulgheru	6	5	7^{9}
(Germany) Tamara Korpatsch	1	7	6^{7}
