= 2018 French Open – Day-by-day summaries =

The 2018 French Open described below in detail, in form of day-by-day summaries.

All dates are CEST (UTC+2).

== Day 1 (27 May) ==
- Schedule of play
- Seeds out:
  - Women's Singles: (Latvia) Jeļena Ostapenko [5], (United States) Venus Williams [9], (United Kingdom) Johanna Konta [22]

Matches on main courts
Matches on Court Philippe Chatrier (Center Court)
Event	Winner	Loser	Score
Men's Singles 1st Round	(Bulgaria) Grigor Dimitrov [4]	(Egypt) Mohamed Safwat [LL]	6–1, 6–4, 7–6^{(7–1)}
Women's Singles 1st Round	(France) Alizé Cornet [32]	(Italy) Sara Errani	2–6, 6–2, 6–3
Men's Singles 1st Round	(France) Lucas Pouille [15]	(Russia) Daniil Medvedev	6–2, 6–3, 6–4
Women's Singles 1st Round	(Ukraine) Kateryna Kozlova	(Latvia) Jeļena Ostapenko [5]	7–5, 6–3
Matches on Court Suzanne Lenglen (Grandstand)
Event	Winner	Loser	Score
Women's Singles 1st Round	(Ukraine) Elina Svitolina [4]	(Australia) Ajla Tomljanović	7–5, 6–3
Men's Singles 1st Round	(France) Gaël Monfils [32]	(France) Elliot Benchetrit [WC]	3–6, 6–1, 6–2, 6–1
Women's Singles 1st Round	(China) Wang Qiang	(United States) Venus Williams [9]	6–4, 7–5
Men's Singles 1st Round	(Germany) Alexander Zverev [2]	(Lithuania) Ričardas Berankis	6–1, 6–1, 6–2
Women's Singles 1st Round	(France) Chloé Paquet [WC] vs (France) Pauline Parmentier [WC]		6–3, 6–7^{(4–7)}, 1–3, suspended
Matches on Court 1
Event	Winner	Loser	Score
Women's Singles 1st Round	(Czech Republic) Barbora Strýcová [26]	(Japan) Kurumi Nara	1–6, 6–3, 6–4
Men's Singles 1st Round	(Japan) Kei Nishikori [19]	(France) Maxime Janvier [WC]	7–6^{(7–0)}, 6–4, 6–3
Women's Singles 1st Round	(Kazakhstan) Yulia Putintseva	(United Kingdom) Johanna Konta [22]	6–4, 6–3
Men's Singles 1st Round	(Belgium) David Goffin [8]	(Netherlands) Robin Haase	4–6, 4–6, 6–4, 6–1, 6–0

== Day 2 (28 May) ==
- Schedule of play
- Seeds out:
  - Men's Singles: (Germany) Philipp Kohlschreiber [22], (Switzerland) Stan Wawrinka [23], (Luxembourg) Gilles Müller [29]
  - Women's Singles: (Latvia) Anastasija Sevastova [20], (France) Kristina Mladenovic [29]

Matches on main courts
Matches on Court Philippe Chatrier (Center Court)
Event	Winner	Loser	Score
Women's Singles 1st Round	(Czech Republic) Petra Kvitová [8]	(Paraguay) Verónica Cepede Royg	3–6, 6–1, 7–5
Men's Singles 1st Round	(Serbia) Novak Djokovic [20]	(Brazil) Rogério Dutra Silva [Q]	6–3, 6–4, 6–4
Women's Singles 1st Round	(Denmark) Caroline Wozniacki [2]	(United States) Danielle Collins	7–6^{(7–2)}, 6–1
Men's Singles 1st Round	(Spain) Rafael Nadal [1] vs (Italy) Simone Bolelli [LL]		6–4, 6–3, 0–3, suspended
Matches on Court Suzanne Lenglen (Grandstand)
Event	Winner	Loser	Score
Men's Singles 1st Round	(Spain) Guillermo García López	(Switzerland) Stan Wawrinka [23]	6–2, 3–6, 4–6, 7–6^{(7–5)}, 6–3
Women's Singles 1st Round	(France) Pauline Parmentier [WC]	(France) Chloé Paquet [WC]	3–6, 7–6^{(7–4)}, 6–2
Women's Singles 1st Round	(Germany) Andrea Petkovic	(France) Kristina Mladenovic [29]	7–6^{(12–10)}, 6–2
Men's Singles 1st Round	(France) Richard Gasquet [27]	(Italy) Andreas Seppi	6–0, 6–2, 6–2
Matches on Court 1
Event	Winner	Loser	Score
Men's Singles 1st Round	(France) Benoît Paire	(Spain) Roberto Carballés Baena	6–3, 6–7^{(3–7)}, 7–6^{(11–9)}, 6–1
Men's Singles 1st Round	(Austria) Dominic Thiem [7]	(Belarus) Ilya Ivashka [Q]	6–2, 6–4, 6–1
Women's Singles 1st Round	(United States) CoCo Vandeweghe [15]	(Germany) Laura Siegemund	6–4, 6–4
Women's Singles 1st Round	(Czech Republic) Karolína Plíšková [6]	(Czech Republic) Barbora Krejčíková [Q]	7–6^{(8–6)}, 6–4

== Day 3 (29 May) ==
- Schedule of play
- Seeds out:
  - Men's Singles: (United States) Jack Sock [14], (France) Adrian Mannarino [25], (Spain) Feliciano López [28]
  - Men's Doubles: (United States) Mike Bryan / (United States) Sam Querrey [16]

Matches on main courts
Matches on Court Philippe Chatrier (Center Court)
Event	Winner	Loser	Score
Men's Singles 1st Round	(Croatia) Marin Čilić [3]	(Australia) James Duckworth [PR]	6–3, 7–5, 7–6^{(7–4)}
Men's Singles 1st Round	(Spain) Rafael Nadal [1]	(Italy) Simone Bolelli [LL]	6–4, 6–3, 7–6^{(11–9)}
Women's Singles 1st Round	(United States) Serena Williams [PR]	(Czech Republic) Kristýna Plíšková	7–6^{(7–4)}, 6–4
Men's Singles 1st Round	(France) Jérémy Chardy vs (Czech Republic) Tomáš Berdych [17]		7–6^{(7–5)}, 7–6^{(10–8)}, 1–1, suspended
Matches on Court Suzanne Lenglen (Grandstand)
Event	Winner	Loser	Score
Men's Singles 1st Round	(Canada) Denis Shapovalov [24]	(Australia) John Millman	7–5, 6–4, 6–2
Women's Singles 1st Round	(Russia) Maria Sharapova [28]	(Netherlands) Richèl Hogenkamp [Q]	6–1, 4–6, 6–3
Women's Singles 1st Round	(France) Caroline Garcia [7]	(China) Duan Yingying	6–1, 6–0
Men's Singles 1st Round	(Argentina) Juan Martín del Potro [5]	(France) Nicolas Mahut [WC]	1–6, 6–1, 6–2, 6–4
Matches on Court 1
Event	Winner	Loser	Score
Women's Singles 1st Round	(Spain) Garbiñe Muguruza [3]	(Russia) Svetlana Kuznetsova	7–6^{(7–0)}, 6–2
Men's Singles 1st Round	(United States) Steve Johnson	(France) Adrian Mannarino [25]	7–6^{(7–1)}, 6–2, 6–2
Women's Singles 1st Round	(Germany) Julia Görges [11]	(Slovakia) Dominika Cibulková	6–4, 5–7, 6–0
Men's Singles 1st Round	(Argentina) Leonardo Mayer vs (France) Julien Benneteau		6–2, 4–3, suspended

== Day 4 (30 May) ==
- Schedule of play
- Seeds out:
  - Men's Singles: (United States) Sam Querrey [12], (Czech Republic) Tomáš Berdych [17]
  - Women's Singles: (Spain) Carla Suárez Navarro [23], (France) Alizé Cornet [32]
  - Men's Doubles: (Pakistan) Aisam-ul-Haq Qureshi / (Netherlands) Jean-Julien Rojer [7], (Japan) Ben McLachlan / (Germany) Jan-Lennard Struff [14]
  - Women's Doubles: (Australia) Ashleigh Barty / (United States) CoCo Vandeweghe [7], (Latvia) Jeļena Ostapenko / (Russia) Elena Vesnina [10], (Japan) Shuko Aoyama / (Japan) Miyu Kato [14], (Poland) Alicja Rosolska / (United States) Abigail Spears [15]
  - Mixed Doubles: (Chinese Taipei) Chan Hao-ching / (New Zealand) Michael Venus [6]

Matches on main courts
Matches on Court Philippe Chatrier (Center Court)
Event	Winner	Loser	Score
Women's Singles 1st Round	(Romania) Simona Halep [1]	(United States) Alison Riske	2–6, 6–1, 6–1
Men's Singles 1st Round	(France) Jérémy Chardy	(Czech Republic) Tomáš Berdych [17]	7–6^{(7–5)}, 7–6^{(10–8)}, 1–6, 5–7, 6–2
Men's Singles 2nd Round	(Japan) Kei Nishikori [19]	(France) Benoît Paire	6–3, 2–6, 4–6, 6–2, 6–3
Women's Singles 2nd Round	(Denmark) Caroline Wozniacki [2]	(Spain) Georgina García Pérez [Q]	6–1, 6–0
Men's Singles 2nd Round	(France) Lucas Pouille [15] vs (United Kingdom) Cameron Norrie		6–2, 6–4, 5–7, suspended
Matches on Court Suzanne Lenglen (Grandstand)
Event	Winner	Loser	Score
Women's Singles 2nd Round	(Ukraine) Elina Svitolina [4]	(Slovakia) Viktória Kužmová	6–3, 6–4
Men's Singles 2nd Round	(Serbia) Novak Djokovic [20]	(Spain) Jaume Munar [Q]	7–6^{(7–1)}, 6–4, 6–4
Men's Singles 2nd Round	(Belgium) David Goffin [8]	(France) Corentin Moutet [WC]	7–5, 6–0, 6–1
Women's Singles 2nd Round	(France) Pauline Parmentier [WC]	(France) Alizé Cornet [32]	6–7^{(2–7)}, 6–4, 6–2
Matches on Court 1
Event	Winner	Loser	Score
Women's Singles 2nd Round	(Czech Republic) Petra Kvitová [8]	(Spain) Lara Arruabarrena	6–0, 6–4
Men's Singles 1st Round	(France) Julien Benneteau	(Argentina) Leonardo Mayer	2–6, 7–6^{(7–4)}, 6–2, 6–3
Men's Singles 2nd Round	(Germany) Alexander Zverev [2]	(Serbia) Dušan Lajović	2–6, 7–5, 4–6, 6–1, 6–2
Men's Singles 2nd Round	(France) Gaël Monfils [32]	(Slovakia) Martin Kližan [Q]	6–2, 6–4, 6–4

== Day 5 (31 May) ==
- Schedule of play
- Seeds out:
  - Men's Singles: (Canada) Denis Shapovalov [24]
  - Women's Singles: (United States) CoCo Vandeweghe [15], (Australia) Ashleigh Barty [17], (China) Zhang Shuai [27], (Russia) Anastasia Pavlyuchenkova [30]
  - Men's Doubles: (Croatia) Ivan Dodig / (United States) Rajeev Ram [9]
  - Women's Doubles: (Belgium) Elise Mertens / (Netherlands) Demi Schuurs [12]
  - Mixed Doubles: (Czech Republic) Kateřina Siniaková / (United Kingdom) Jamie Murray [4]

Matches on main courts
Matches on Court Philippe Chatrier (Center Court)
Event	Winner	Loser	Score
Men's Singles 2nd Round	(Croatia) Marin Čilić [3]	(Poland) Hubert Hurkacz [Q]	6–2, 6–2, 6–7^{(3–7)}, 7–5
Men's Singles 2nd Round	(France) Lucas Pouille [15]	(United Kingdom) Cameron Norrie	6–2, 6–4, 5–7, 7–6^{(7–3)}
Women's Singles 2nd Round	(Romania) Simona Halep [1]	(United States) Taylor Townsend [WC]	6–3, 6–1
Men's Singles 2nd Round	(Argentina) Juan Martín del Potro [5]	(France) Julien Benneteau	6–4, 6–3, 6–2
Women's Singles 2nd Round	(United States) Serena Williams [PR]	(Australia) Ashleigh Barty [17]	3–6, 6–3, 6–4
Matches on Court Suzanne Lenglen (Grandstand)
Event	Winner	Loser	Score
Women's Singles 2nd Round	(Spain) Garbiñe Muguruza [3]	(France) Fiona Ferro [WC]	6–4, 6–3
Men's Singles 2nd Round	(France) Richard Gasquet [27]	(Tunisia) Malek Jaziri	6–2, 3–6, 6–3, 6–0
Men's Singles 2nd Round	(Spain) Rafael Nadal [1]	(Argentina) Guido Pella	6–2, 6–1, 6–1
Women's Singles 2nd Round	(France) Caroline Garcia [7]	(China) Peng Shuai	6–4, 3–6, 6–3
Matches on Court 1
Event	Winner	Loser	Score
Men's Singles 2nd Round	(Germany) Maximilian Marterer	(Canada) Denis Shapovalov [24]	5–7, 7–6^{(7–4)}, 7–5, 6–4
Women's Singles 2nd Round	(Russia) Maria Sharapova [28]	(Croatia) Donna Vekić	7–5, 6–4
Men's Singles 2nd Round	(France) Pierre-Hugues Herbert	(France) Jérémy Chardy	2–6, 6–3, 6–2, 3–6, 9–7

== Day 6 (1 June) ==
- Schedule of play
- Seeds out:
  - Men's Singles: (Bulgaria) Grigor Dimitrov [4], (Spain) Pablo Carreño Busta [10], (Spain) Roberto Bautista Agut [13], (Bosnia and Herzegovina) Damir Džumhur [26]
  - Women's Singles: (Ukraine) Elina Svitolina [4], (Japan) Naomi Osaka [21]
  - Men's Doubles: (Uruguay) Pablo Cuevas / (Spain) Marcel Granollers [11], (Chile) Julio Peralta / (Argentina) Horacio Zeballos [15]
  - Women's Doubles: (Ukraine) Nadiia Kichenok / (Australia) Anastasia Rodionova [16]
  - Mixed Doubles: (Hungary) Tímea Babos / (India) Rohan Bopanna [7]

Matches on main courts
Matches on Court Philippe Chatrier (Center Court)
Event	Winner	Loser	Score
Men's Singles 3rd Round	(Germany) Alexander Zverev [2]	(Bosnia and Herzegovina) Damir Džumhur [26]	6–2, 3–6, 4–6, 7–6^{(7–3)}, 7–5
Women's Singles 3rd Round	(Denmark) Caroline Wozniacki [2]	(France) Pauline Parmentier [WC]	6–0, 6–3
Men's Singles 3rd Round	(France) Lucas Pouille [15] vs (Russia) Karen Khachanov		3–6, 5–7, 1–1, suspended
Matches on Court Suzanne Lenglen (Grandstand)
Event	Winner	Loser	Score
Women's Singles 3rd Round	(United States) Madison Keys [13]	(Japan) Naomi Osaka [21]	6–1, 7–6^{(9–7)}
Men's Singles 3rd Round	(Serbia) Novak Djokovic [20]	(Spain) Roberto Bautista Agut [13]	6–4, 6–7^{(6–8)}, 7–6^{(7–4)}, 6–2
Men's Singles 3rd Round	(Belgium) David Goffin [8] vs (France) Gaël Monfils [32]		6–7^{(6–8)}, 6–3, 3–2, suspended
Matches on Court 1
Event	Winner	Loser	Score
Men's Singles 3rd Round	(Spain) Fernando Verdasco [30]	(Bulgaria) Grigor Dimitrov [4]	7–6^{(7–4)}, 6–2, 6–4
Women's Singles 3rd Round	(Romania) Mihaela Buzărnescu [31]	(Ukraine) Elina Svitolina [4]	6–3, 7–5
Men's Singles 3rd Round	(Austria) Dominic Thiem [7]	(Italy) Matteo Berrettini	6–3, 6–7^{(5–7)}, 6–3, 6–2
Men's Doubles 2nd Round	(Netherlands) Robin Haase / (Netherlands) Matwé Middelkoop vs (France) Pierre-Hugues Herbert / (France) Nicolas Mahut [6]		5–4, suspended

== Day 7 (2 June) ==
- Schedule of play
- Seeds out:
  - Men's Singles: (France) Lucas Pouille [15], (United Kingdom) Kyle Edmund [16], (France) Richard Gasquet [27], (Spain) Albert Ramos Viñolas [31], (France) Gaël Monfils [32]
  - Women's Singles: (Czech Republic) Karolína Plíšková [6], (Czech Republic) Petra Kvitová [8], (Germany) Julia Görges [11], (Netherlands) Kiki Bertens [18], (Slovakia) Magdaléna Rybáriková [19], (Australia) Daria Gavrilova [24]
  - Men's Doubles: (Poland) Łukasz Kubot / (Brazil) Marcelo Melo [1], (United Kingdom) Jamie Murray / (Brazil) Bruno Soares [4], (South Africa) Raven Klaasen / (New Zealand) Michael Venus [10]
  - Women's Doubles: (Chinese Taipei) Latisha Chan / (United States) Bethanie Mattek-Sands [4], (United States) Raquel Atawo / (Germany) Anna-Lena Grönefeld [11]
  - Mixed Doubles: (China) Xu Yifan / (Austria) Oliver Marach [3]

Matches on main courts
Matches on Court Philippe Chatrier (Center Court)
Event	Winner	Loser	Score
Women's Singles 3rd Round	(Spain) Garbiñe Muguruza [3]	(Australia) Samantha Stosur	6–0, 6–2
Men's Singles 3rd Round	(Russia) Karen Khachanov	(France) Lucas Pouille [15]	6–3, 7–5, 6–3
Women's Singles 3rd Round	(Russia) Maria Sharapova [28]	(Czech Republic) Karolína Plíšková [6]	6–2, 6–1
Men's Singles 3rd Round	(Spain) Rafael Nadal [1]	(France) Richard Gasquet [27]	6–3, 6–2, 6–2
Men's Singles 3rd Round	(Argentina) Juan Martín del Potro [5]	(Spain) Albert Ramos Viñolas [31]	7–5, 6–4, 6–1
Matches on Court Suzanne Lenglen (Grandstand)
Event	Winner	Loser	Score
Men's Singles 3rd Round	(Italy) Fabio Fognini [18]	(United Kingdom) Kyle Edmund [16]	6–3, 4–6, 3–6, 6–4, 6–4
Men's Singles 3rd Round	(Belgium) David Goffin [8]	(France) Gaël Monfils [32]	6–7^{(6–8)}, 6–3, 4–6, 7–5, 6–3
Women's Singles 3rd Round	(France) Caroline Garcia [7]	(Romania) Irina-Camelia Begu	6–1, 6–3
Women's Singles 3rd Round	(United States) Serena Williams [PR]	(Germany) Julia Görges [11]	6–3, 6–4
Matches on Court 1
Event	Winner	Loser	Score
Women's Singles 3rd Round	(Estonia) Anett Kontaveit [25]	(Czech Republic) Petra Kvitová [8]	7–6^{(8–6)}, 7–6^{(7–4)}
Men's Singles 3rd Round	(South Africa) Kevin Anderson [6]	(Germany) Mischa Zverev	6–1, 6–7^{(3–7)}, 6–3, 7–6^{(7–4)}
Men's Singles 3rd Round	(Croatia) Marin Čilić [3]	(United States) Steve Johnson	6–3, 6–2, 6–4
Women's Singles 3rd Round	(Germany) Angelique Kerber [12]	(Netherlands) Kiki Bertens [18]	7–6^{(7–4)}, 7–6^{(7–4)}

== Day 8 (3 June) ==
- Schedule of play
- Seeds out:
  - Men's Singles: (Belgium) David Goffin [8], (Japan) Kei Nishikori [19], (Spain) Fernando Verdasco [30]
  - Women's Singles: (Estonia) Anett Kontaveit [25], (Czech Republic) Barbora Strýcová [26], (Romania) Mihaela Buzărnescu [31]
  - Women's Doubles: (Netherlands) Kiki Bertens / (Sweden) Johanna Larsson [9]
  - Mixed Doubles: (Slovenia) Andreja Klepač / (Netherlands) Jean-Julien Rojer [5]

Matches on main courts
Matches on Court Philippe Chatrier (Center Court)
Event	Winner	Loser	Score
Women's Singles 4th Round	(United States) Madison Keys [13]	(Romania) Mihaela Buzărnescu [31]	6–1, 6–4
Men's Singles 4th Round	(Austria) Dominic Thiem [7]	(Japan) Kei Nishikori [19]	6–2, 6–0, 5–7, 6–4
Women's Singles 4th Round	(United States) Sloane Stephens [10]	(Estonia) Anett Kontaveit [25]	6–2, 6–0
Men's Singles 4th Round	(Serbia) Novak Djokovic [20]	(Spain) Fernando Verdasco [30]	6–3, 6–4, 6–2
Women's Singles 4th Round	(Russia) Daria Kasatkina [14] vs (Denmark) Caroline Wozniacki [2]		7–6^{(7–5)}, 3–3, suspended
Matches on Court Suzanne Lenglen (Grandstand)
Event	Winner	Loser	Score
Men's Singles 4th Round	(Germany) Alexander Zverev [2]	(Russia) Karen Khachanov	4–6, 7–6^{(7–4)}, 2–6, 6–3, 6–3
Women's Singles 4th Round	(Kazakhstan) Yulia Putintseva	(Czech Republic) Barbora Strýcová [26]	6–4, 6–3
Men's Singles 4th Round	(Italy) Marco Cecchinato	(Belgium) David Goffin [8]	7–5, 4–6, 6–0, 6–3
Matches on Court 1
Event	Winner	Loser	Score
Women's Doubles 3rd Round	(Chinese Taipei) Chan Hao-ching [8] (China) Yang Zhaoxuan [8]	(Romania) Sorana Cîrstea (Spain) Sara Sorribes Tormo	6–2, 6–4
Men's Doubles 3rd Round	(Argentina) Máximo González (Chile) Nicolás Jarry	(France) Calvin Hemery [Alt] (France) Stéphane Robert [Alt]	7–5, 6–3
Men's Doubles 2nd Round	(France) Pierre-Hugues Herbert [6] (France) Nicolas Mahut [6]	(Netherlands) Robin Haase (Netherlands) Matwé Middelkoop	7–5, 7–6^{(8–6)}
Women's Doubles 3rd Round	(Slovenia) Andreja Klepač [3] (Spain) María José Martínez Sánchez [3]	(United States) Serena Williams [WC] (United States) Venus Williams [WC]	6–4, 6–7^{(4–7)}, 6–0

== Day 9 (4 June) ==
- Schedule of play
- Seeds out:
  - Men's Singles: (South Africa) Kevin Anderson [6], (United States) John Isner [9], (Italy) Fabio Fognini [18]
  - Women's Singles: (Denmark) Caroline Wozniacki [2], (France) Caroline Garcia [7], (Belgium) Elise Mertens [16]
  - Men's Doubles: (Finland) Henri Kontinen / (Australia) John Peers [3]
  - Women's Doubles: (Canada) Gabriela Dabrowski / (China) Xu Yifan [5], (United States) Nicole Melichar / (Czech Republic) Květa Peschke [13]

Matches on main courts
Matches on Court Philippe Chatrier (Center Court)
Event	Winner	Loser	Score
Women's Singles 4th Round	(Romania) Simona Halep [1]	(Belgium) Elise Mertens [16]	6–2, 6–1
Women's Singles 4th Round	(Russia) Daria Kasatkina [14]	(Denmark) Caroline Wozniacki [2]	7–6^{(7–5)}, 6–3
Men's Singles 4th Round	(Spain) Rafael Nadal [1]	(Germany) Maximilian Marterer	6–3, 6–2, 7–6^{(7–4)}
Men's Singles 4th Round	(Croatia) Marin Čilić [3]	(Italy) Fabio Fognini [18]	6–4, 6–1, 3–6, 6–7^{(4–7)}, 6–3
Matches on Court Suzanne Lenglen (Grandstand)
Event	Winner	Loser	Score
Men's Singles 4th Round	(Argentina) Diego Schwartzman [11]	(South Africa) Kevin Anderson [6]	1–6, 2–6, 7–5, 7–6^{(7–0)}, 6–2
Women's Singles 4th Round	(Germany) Angelique Kerber [12]	(France) Caroline Garcia [7]	6–2, 6–3
Men's Singles 4th Round	(Argentina) Juan Martín del Potro [5]	(United States) John Isner [9]	6–4, 6–4, 6–4
Matches on Court 1
Event	Winner	Loser	Score
Men's Doubles Quarterfinals	(Spain) Feliciano López [12] (Spain) Marc López [12]	(Finland) Henri Kontinen [3] (Australia) John Peers [3]	6–4, 6–7^{(2–7)}, 7–6^{(7–3)}
Women's Doubles 3rd Round	(Hungary) Tímea Babos [1] (France) Kristina Mladenovic [1]	(United States) Nicole Melichar [13] (Czech Republic) Květa Peschke [13]	4–6, 6–2, 7–5
Men's Doubles 3rd Round	(France) Pierre-Hugues Herbert [6] (France) Nicolas Mahut [6]	(United States) Steve Johnson (United States) Jack Sock	6–4, 6–3
Women's Singles 4th Round	(Spain) Garbiñe Muguruza [3]	(Ukraine) Lesia Tsurenko	2–0, retired

== Day 10 (5 June) ==
- Schedule of play
- Seeds out:
  - Men's Singles: (Germany) Alexander Zverev [2], (Serbia) Novak Djokovic [20]
  - Women's Singles: (Russia) Daria Kasatkina [14]
  - Men's Doubles: (Colombia) Juan Sebastián Cabal / (Colombia) Robert Farah [5], (India) Rohan Bopanna / (France) Édouard Roger-Vasselin [13]
  - Women's Doubles: (Slovenia) Andreja Klepač / (Spain) María José Martínez Sánchez [3]

Matches on main courts
Matches on Court Philippe Chatrier (Center Court)
Event	Winner	Loser	Score
Men's Singles Quarterfinals	(Austria) Dominic Thiem [7]	(Germany) Alexander Zverev [2]	6–4, 6–2, 6–1
Women's Singles Quarterfinals	(United States) Sloane Stephens [10]	(Russia) Daria Kasatkina [14]	6–3, 6–1
Matches on Court Suzanne Lenglen (Grandstand)
Event	Winner	Loser	Score
Women's Singles Quarterfinals	(United States) Madison Keys [13]	(Kazakhstan) Yulia Putintseva	7–6^{(7–5)}, 6–4
Men's Singles Quarterfinals	(Italy) Marco Cecchinato	(Serbia) Novak Djokovic [20]	6–3, 7–6^{(7–4)}, 1–6, 7–6^{(13–11)}
Matches on Court 1
Event	Winner	Loser	Score
Men's Doubles Quarterfinals	(Austria) Oliver Marach [2] (Croatia) Mate Pavić [2]	(Colombia) Juan Sebastián Cabal [5] (Colombia) Robert Farah [5]	3–6, 6–4, 6–3
Women's Doubles Quarterfinals	(Czech Republic) Barbora Krejčíková [6] (Czech Republic) Kateřina Siniaková [6]	(Slovenia) Andreja Klepač [3] (Spain) María José Martínez Sánchez [3]	6–3, 6–3
Mixed Doubles Semifinals	(Canada) Gabriela Dabrowski [1] (Croatia) Mate Pavić [1]	(Slovenia) Katarina Srebotnik (Mexico) Santiago González	6–4, 6–4
Men's Doubles Quarterfinals	(Croatia) Nikola Mektić [8] (Austria) Alexander Peya [8]	(India) Rohan Bopanna [13] (France) Édouard Roger-Vasselin [13]	7–6^{(7–4)}, 6–2

== Day 11 (6 June) ==
- Schedule of play
- Seeds out:
  - Women's Singles: (Germany) Angelique Kerber [12], (Russia) Maria Sharapova [28]
  - Women's Doubles: (Hungary) Tímea Babos / (France) Kristina Mladenovic [1]
  - Mixed Doubles: (Germany) Anna-Lena Grönefeld / (Colombia) Robert Farah [8]

Matches on main courts
Matches on Court Philippe Chatrier (Center Court)
Event	Winner	Loser	Score
Women's Singles Quarterfinals	(Spain) Garbiñe Muguruza [3]	(Russia) Maria Sharapova [28]	6–2, 6–1
Men's Singles Quarterfinals	(Spain) Rafael Nadal [1] vs (Argentina) Diego Schwartzman [11]		4–6, 5–3, suspended
Matches on Court Suzanne Lenglen (Grandstand)
Event	Winner	Loser	Score
Women's Singles Quarterfinals	(Romania) Simona Halep [1]	(Germany) Angelique Kerber [12]	6–7^{(2–7)}, 6–3, 6–2
Men's Singles Quarterfinals	(Croatia) Marin Čilić [3] vs (Argentina) Juan Martín del Potro [5]		6–6^{(5–5)}, suspended
Matches on Court 1
Event	Winner	Loser	Score
Legends Over 45 Doubles	(France) Mansour Bahrami (France) Fabrice Santoro	(Sweden) Mikael Pernfors (Sweden) Mats Wilander	6–2, 6–4
Men's Doubles Quarterfinals	(France) Pierre-Hugues Herbert [6] (France) Nicolas Mahut [6]	(Argentina) Máximo González (Chile) Nicolás Jarry	6–4, 7–6^{(10–8)}
Women's Doubles Quarterfinals	(Japan) Eri Hozumi (Japan) Makoto Ninomiya	(Hungary) Tímea Babos [1] (France) Kristina Mladenovic [1]	7–6^{(7–4)}, 6–3
Women's Doubles Quarterfinals	(Czech Republic) Andrea Sestini Hlaváčková [2] (Czech Republic) Barbora Strýcová [2]	(Spain) Lara Arruabarrena (Slovenia) Katarina Srebotnik	6–3, 6–1

== Day 12 (7 June) ==
- Schedule of play
- Seeds out:
  - Men's Singles: (Croatia) Marin Čilić [3], (Argentina) Diego Schwartzman [11]
  - Women's Singles: (Spain) Garbiñe Muguruza [3], (United States) Madison Keys [13]
  - Men's Doubles: (Croatia) Nikola Mektić / (Austria) Alexander Peya [8]
  - Mixed Doubles: (Canada) Gabriela Dabrowski / (Croatia) Mate Pavić [1]

Matches on main courts
Matches on Court Philippe Chatrier (Center Court)
Event	Winner	Loser	Score
Men's Singles Quarterfinals	(Spain) Rafael Nadal [1]	(Argentina) Diego Schwartzman [11]	4–6, 6–3, 6–2, 6–2
Women's Singles Semifinals	(Romania) Simona Halep [1]	(Spain) Garbiñe Muguruza [3]	6–1, 6–4
Women's Singles Semifinals	(United States) Sloane Stephens [10]	(United States) Madison Keys [13]	6–4, 6–4
Matches on Court Suzanne Lenglen (Grandstand)
Event	Winner	Loser	Score
Men's Singles Quarterfinals	(Argentina) Juan Martín del Potro [5]	(Croatia) Marin Čilić [3]	7–6^{(7–5)}, 5–7, 6–3, 7–5
Mixed Doubles Final	(Chinese Taipei) Latisha Chan [2] (Croatia) Ivan Dodig [2]	(Canada) Gabriela Dabrowski [1] (Croatia) Mate Pavić [1]	6–1, 6–7^{(5–7)}, [10–8]
Men's Doubles Semifinals	(France) Pierre-Hugues Herbert [6] (France) Nicolas Mahut [6]	(Croatia) Nikola Mektić [8] (Austria) Alexander Peya [8]	6–3, 6–4
Matches on Court 1
Event	Winner	Loser	Score
Women's Legends Doubles	(Belgium) Kim Clijsters (France) Nathalie Tauziat	(Croatia) Iva Majoli (Spain) Arantxa Sánchez Vicario	6–2, 6–4
Women's Legends Doubles	(France) Nathalie Dechy (France) Amélie Mauresmo	(Spain) Conchita Martínez (France) Sandrine Testud	6–2, 6–7^{(5–7)}, [10–7]
Legends Over 45 Doubles	(Spain) Sergi Bruguera (Morocco) Younes El Aynaoui	(United States) Michael Chang (France) Henri Leconte	6–4, 6–3
Legends Over 45 Doubles	(France) Arnaud Boetsch (Australia) Pat Cash	(Sweden) Mikael Pernfors (Sweden) Mats Wilander	5–7, retired

== Day 13 (8 June) ==
- Schedule of play
- Seeds out:
  - Men's Singles: (Argentina) Juan Martín del Potro [5]
  - Men's Doubles: (Spain) Feliciano López / (Spain) Marc López [12]
  - Women's Doubles: (Czech Republic) Andrea Sestini Hlaváčková / (Czech Republic) Barbora Strýcová [2], (Chinese Taipei) Chan Hao-ching / (China) Yang Zhaoxuan [8]

Matches on main courts
Matches on Court Philippe Chatrier (Center Court)
Event	Winner	Loser	Score
Men's Singles Semifinals	(Austria) Dominic Thiem [7]	(Italy) Marco Cecchinato	7–5, 7–6^{(12–10)}, 6–1
Men's Singles Semifinals	(Spain) Rafael Nadal [1]	(Argentina) Juan Martín del Potro [5]	6–4, 6–1, 6–2
Matches on Court Suzanne Lenglen (Grandstand)
Event	Winner	Loser	Score
Legends Over 45 Doubles	(France) Mansour Bahrami (France) Fabrice Santoro	(France) Arnaud Boetsch (Australia) Pat Cash	6–3, 2–6, [10–7]
Men's Doubles Semifinals	(Austria) Oliver Marach [2] (Croatia) Mate Pavić [2]	(Spain) Feliciano López [8] (Spain) Marc López [8]	6–4, 7–5
Women's Doubles Semifinals	(Japan) Eri Hozumi (Japan) Makoto Ninomiya	(Chinese Taipei) Chan Hao-ching [8] (China) Yang Zhaoxuan [8]	6–2, 6–2
Women's Doubles Semifinals	(Czech Republic) Barbora Krejčíková [6] (Czech Republic) Kateřina Siniaková [6]	(Czech Republic) Andrea Sestini Hlaváčková [2] (Czech Republic) Barbora Strýcová [2]	6–3, 6–2
Matches on Court 1
Event	Winner	Loser	Score
Women's Legends Doubles	(France) Marion Bartoli (United States) Martina Navratilova	(Croatia) Iva Majoli (Spain) Arantxa Sánchez Vicario	6–3, 6–3
Women's Legends Doubles	(France) Nathalie Dechy (France) Amélie Mauresmo	(United States) Tracey Austin (United States) Lindsay Davenport	6–2, 6–2
Legends Under 45 Doubles	(France) Sébastien Grosjean (France) Michaël Llodra	(United States) James Blake (Australia) Mark Philippoussis	6–2, 6–2

== Day 14 (9 June) ==
- Schedule of play
- Seeds out:
  - Women's Singles: (United States) Sloane Stephens [10]
  - Men's Doubles: (Austria) Oliver Marach / (Croatia) Mate Pavić [2]

Matches on main courts
Matches on Court Philippe Chatrier (Center Court)
Event	Winner	Loser	Score
Women's Singles Final	(Romania) Simona Halep [1]	(United States) Sloane Stephens [10]	3–6, 6–4, 6–1
Men's Doubles Final	(France) Pierre-Hugues Herbert [6] (France) Nicolas Mahut [6]	(Austria) Oliver Marach [2] (Croatia) Mate Pavić [2]	6–2, 7–6^{(7–4)}
Matches on Court Suzanne Lenglen (Grandstand)
Event	Winner	Loser	Score
Women's Legends Doubles Final	(France) Nathalie Dechy (France) Amélie Mauresmo	(Belgium) Kim Clijsters (France) Nathalie Tauziat	6–7^{(4–7)}, 6–4, [15–13]
Legends Under 45 Doubles	(Spain) Àlex Corretja (Spain) Juan Carlos Ferrero	(France) Sébastien Grosjean (France) Michaël Llodra	6–4, 6–2

== Day 15 (10 June) ==
- Schedule of play
- Seeds out:
  - Men's Singles: (Austria) Dominic Thiem [7]

Matches on main courts
Matches on Court Philippe Chatrier (Center Court)
Event	Winner	Loser	Score
Women's Doubles Final	(Czech Republic) Barbora Krejčíková [6] (Czech Republic) Kateřina Siniaková [6]	(Japan) Eri Hozumi (Japan) Makoto Ninomiya	6–3, 6–3
Men's Singles Final	(Spain) Rafael Nadal [1]	(Austria) Dominic Thiem [7]	6–4, 6–3, 6–2
Matches on Court Suzanne Lenglen (Grandstand)
Event	Winner	Loser	Score
Legends Over 45 Doubles Final	(France) Mansour Bahrami (France) Fabrice Santoro	(United States) John McEnroe (France) Cédric Pioline	6–1, 2–6, [12–10]
Legends Under 45 Doubles Final	(Spain) Àlex Corretja (Spain) Juan Carlos Ferrero	(Russia) Yevgeny Kafelnikov (Russia) Marat Safin	6–3, 6–3
