= 2018 French Open – Girls' doubles =

Girls' doubles
- 2018 French Open

Final
- Champions: (United States) Caty McNally (Poland) Iga Świątek
- Runners-up: (Japan) Yuki Naito (Japan) Naho Sato
- Score: 6–2, 7–5

Events
Singles	men	women		boys	girls
Doubles	men	women	mixed	boys	girls
WC Singles	men	women	quad
WC Doubles	men	women	quad
Legends	−45	45+	women
← 2017 ·	French Open	· 2019 →

Caty McNally and Iga Świątek won the girls' doubles tennis title at the 2018 French Open, defeating Yuki Naito and Naho Sato in the final, 6–2, 7–5. They saved three match points en route to the title, in the second round against Camila Osorio and Wang Xiyu.

Bianca Andreescu and Carson Branstine were the defending champions, but chose not to participate.

== Seeds ==
1. (Luxembourg) Eléonora Molinaro / (Denmark) Clara Tauson (semifinals)
2. (Colombia) Camila Osorio / (China) Wang Xiyu (second round)
3. (Japan) Yuki Naito / (Japan) Naho Sato (final)
4. (Chinese Taipei) Joanna Garland / (Chinese Taipei) Liang En-shuo (first round)
5. (Italy) Elisabetta Cocciaretto / (Slovenia) Nika Radišič (withdrew)
6. (Argentina) María Lourdes Carlé / (United States) Cori Gauff (quarterfinals)
7. (Georgia (country)) Ana Makatsaria / (United States) Alexa Noel (quarterfinals)
8. (France) Clara Burel / (France) Yasmine Mansouri (second round)

== Draw ==
=== Key ===
- Q = Qualifier
- WC = Wild card
- LL = Lucky loser
- Alt = Alternate
- SE = Special exempt
- PR = Protected ranking
- ITF = ITF entry
- JE = Junior exempt
- w/o = Walkover
- r = Retired
- d = Defaulted
- SR = Special ranking

=== Finals ===
Semifinals
1	(Luxembourg) Eléonora Molinaro (Denmark) Clara Tauson	3	6	[8]
3	(Japan) Yuki Naito (Japan) Naho Sato	6	1	[10]
WC	(France) Julie Belgraver (France) Loudmilla Bencheikh	3	5
(United States) Caty McNally (Poland) Iga Świątek	6	7

Final
3	(Japan) Yuki Naito (Japan) Naho Sato	2	5
(United States) Caty McNally (Poland) Iga Świątek	6	7

=== Top half ===
First round
1	(Luxembourg) Eléonora Molinaro (Denmark) Clara Tauson	6	7
(Turkey) Selin Övünç (Poland) Stefania Rogozińska Dzik	3	5
(United States) Lea Ma (Slovakia) Viktória Morvayová	6	4	[5]
(Russia) Sofya Lansere (Russia) Kamilla Rakhimova	3	6	[10]
(Georgia (country)) Mariam Dalakishvili (Argentina) Ana Geller	2	3
WC	(France) Elsa Jacquemot (France) Olympe Lancelot	6	6
(Malta) Francesca Curmi (Italy) Melania Delai	7^{7}	2	[4]
7	(Georgia (country)) Ana Makatsaria (United States) Alexa Noel	6^{3}	6	[10]
3	(Japan) Yuki Naito (Japan) Naho Sato	6	6
(United States) Natasha Subhash (United States) Katie Volynets	2	2
(Ukraine) Margaryta Bilokin (Ukraine) Viktoriia Dema	7	7^{7}
(Hungary) Adrienn Nagy (Slovakia) Lenka Stará	5	6^{3}
(Republic of Ireland) Georgia Drummy (Switzerland) Simona Waltert	7	6
(Canada) Leylah Annie Fernandez (Switzerland) Joanne Züger	5	4
WC	(France) Giulia Morlet (France) Diane Parry	3	4
6	(Argentina) María Lourdes Carlé (United States) Cori Gauff	6	6

Second round
1	(Luxembourg) E Molinaro (Denmark) C Tauson	7^{7}	7^{7}
(Russia) S Lansere (Russia) K Rakhimova	6^{1}	6^{3}
WC	(France) E Jacquemot (France) O Lancelot	1	4
7	(Georgia (country)) A Makatsaria (United States) A Noel	6	6
3	(Japan) Y Naito (Japan) N Sato	7	2	[10]
(Ukraine) M Bilokin (Ukraine) V Dema	5	6	[5]
(Republic of Ireland) G Drummy (Switzerland) S Waltert	5	3
6	(Argentina) ML Carlé (United States) C Gauff	7	6

Quarterfinals
1	(Luxembourg) E Molinaro (Denmark) C Tauson	6	6
7	(Georgia (country)) A Makatsaria (United States) A Noel	3	3
3	(Japan) Y Naito (Japan) N Sato	7^{7}	2	[10]
6	(Argentina) ML Carlé (United States) C Gauff	6^{4}	6	[4]

Semifinals
1	(Luxembourg) E Molinaro (Denmark) C Tauson	3	6	[8]
3	(Japan) Y Naito (Japan) N Sato	6	1	[10]

=== Bottom half ===
First round
5	(Italy) Elisabetta Cocciaretto (Slovenia) Nika Radišič
WC	(France) Julie Belgraver (France) Loudmilla Bencheikh	w/o
(Russia) Elina Avanesyan (Russia) Maria Timofeeva	6	7^{7}
(Bulgaria) Gergana Topalova (Latvia) Daniela Vismane	2	6^{3}
(United States) Gabriella Price (Japan) Moyuka Uchijima	6^{1}	1
(Belarus) Viktoryia Kanapatskaya (Russia) Oksana Selekhmeteva	7^{7}	6
WC	(France) Mylène Halemai (France) Manon Léonard	3	6	[10]
4	(Chinese Taipei) Joanna Garland (Chinese Taipei) Liang En-shuo	6	3	[5]
8	(France) Clara Burel (France) Yasmine Mansouri	7	6
(Poland) Anna Hertel (New Zealand) Lulu Sun	5	2
(United States) Chloe Beck (Russia) Taisya Pachkaleva	7^{7}	6
(United States) Dalayna Hewitt (United States) Peyton Stearns	6^{5}	3
(United States) Caty McNally (Poland) Iga Świątek	6	6
(Burundi) Sada Nahimana (Guatemala) María Gabriela Rivera Corado	0	2
(Romania) Andreea Prisăcariu (Japan) Himari Sato	2	4
2	(Colombia) Camila Osorio (China) Wang Xiyu	6	6

Second round
WC	(France) J Belgraver (France) L Bencheikh	2	6	[10]
(Russia) E Avanesyan (Russia) M Timofeeva	6	1	[6]
(Belarus) V Kanapatskaya (Russia) O Selekhmeteva	6	3	[9]
WC	(France) M Halemai (France) M Léonard	2	6	[11]
8	(France) C Burel (France) Y Mansouri	7	4	[7]
(United States) C Beck (Russia) T Pachkaleva	5	6	[10]
(United States) C McNally (Poland) I Świątek	6	5	[12]
2	(Colombia) C Osorio (China) Xiy Wang	3	7	[10]

Quarterfinals
WC	(France) J Belgraver (France) L Bencheikh	6	2	[10]
WC	(France) M Halemai (France) M Léonard	0	6	[8]
(United States) C Beck (Russia) T Pachkaleva	4	3
(United States) C McNally (Poland) I Świątek	6	6

Semifinals
WC	(France) J Belgraver (France) L Bencheikh	3	5
(United States) C McNally (Poland) I Świątek	6	7
