= 2018 French Open – Girls' singles =

Girls' singles
- 2018 French Open

Final
- Champion: (United States) Coco Gauff
- Runner-up: (United States) Caty McNally
- Score: 1–6, 6–3, 7–6^{(7–1)}

Events
Singles	men	women		boys	girls
Doubles	men	women	mixed	boys	girls
WC Singles	men	women	quad
WC Doubles	men	women	quad
Legends	−45	45+	women
← 2017 ·	French Open	· 2019 →

Coco Gauff won the girls' singles tennis title at the 2018 French Open, defeating compatriot Caty McNally in the final, 1–6, 6–3, 7–6^{(7–1)}. She would go on to win the women's title seven years later.

Whitney Osuigwe was the defending champion, but chose not to participate.

== Seeds ==
1. (Chinese Taipei) Liang En-shuo (third round)
2. (China) Wang Xinyu (third round)
3. (Colombia) Camila Osorio (third round)
4. (United States) Alexa Noel (first round)
5. (Denmark) Clara Tauson (third round)
6. (Luxembourg) Eléonora Molinaro (quarterfinals)
7. (Japan) Naho Sato (first round)
8. (China) Wang Xiyu (quarterfinals)

9. (Italy) Elisabetta Cocciaretto (third round)
10. (Japan) Yuki Naito (quarterfinals)
11. (China) Zheng Qinwen (third round)
12. (Argentina) María Lourdes Carlé (third round)
13. (France) Clara Burel (third round)
14. (New Zealand) Lulu Sun (second round)
15. (Canada) Leylah Annie Fernandez (semifinals)
16. (United States) Coco Gauff (champion)

Click on the seed number of a player to go to their draw section.

== Draw ==
=== Key ===
- Q = Qualifier
- WC = Wild card
- LL = Lucky loser
- Alt = Alternate
- ITF = ITF entry
- PR = Protected ranking
- SR = Special ranking
- SE = Special exempt
- JE = Junior exempt
- JR = Junior Accelerator Programme entrant
- CO = College Accelerator Programme entrant
- NG = Next Gen Accelerator Program entrant
- w/o = Walkover
- r = Retired
- d = Defaulted

=== Finals ===
Quarterfinals
(United States) Caty McNally	6	6
8	(China) Wang Xiyu	2	1
(Poland) Iga Świątek	7	7
10	(Japan) Yuki Naito	5	5
(Chinese Taipei) Joanna Garland	4	1
15	(Canada) Leylah Annie Fernandez	6	6
6	(Luxembourg) Eléonora Molinaro	2	6^{1}
16	(United States) Coco Gauff	6	7^{7}

Semifinals
(United States) Caty McNally	3	7^{8}	6
(Poland) Iga Świątek	6	6^{6}	4
15	(Canada) Leylah Annie Fernandez	4	3
16	(United States) Coco Gauff	6	6

Final
(United States) Caty McNally	6	3	6^{1}
16	(United States) Coco Gauff	1	6	7^{7}

=== Top half ===
==== Section 1 ====
First round
1	(Chinese Taipei) Liang En-shuo	6	6
(United States) Dalayna Hewitt	3	1
Q	(France) Alice Tubello	4	6	6
Q	(Russia) Taisya Pachkaleva	6	3	4
(United States) Caty McNally	6	6
Q	(Malta) Francesca Curmi	1	1
WC	(Brazil) Ana Paula Melilo	5	1
14	(New Zealand) Lulu Sun	7	6
12	(Argentina) María Lourdes Carlé	7^{7}	6
WC	(France) Elsa Jacquemot	6^{2}	0
(United States) Natasha Subhash	4	0
(Bulgaria) Gergana Topalova	6	6
(Japan) Himari Sato	1	2
(Romania) Andreea Prisăcariu	6	6
WC	(France) Olympe Lancelot	4	5
8	(China) Wang Xiyu	6	7

Second round
1	(Chinese Taipei) E-s Liang	6	2	6
Q	(France) A Tubello	3	6	2
(United States) C McNally	6^{3}	6	7^{7}
14	(New Zealand) L Sun	7^{7}	1	6^{4}
12	(Argentina) ML Carlé	3	6	6
(Bulgaria) G Topalova	6	4	3
(Romania) A Prisăcariu	1	0
8	(China) Xiy Wang	6	6

Third round
1	(Chinese Taipei) E-s Liang	2	7^{8}	5
(United States) C McNally	6	6^{6}	7
12	(Argentina) ML Carlé	1	2
8	(China) Xiy Wang	6	6

Quarterfinals
(United States) C McNally	6	6
8	(China) Xiy Wang	2	1

==== Section 2 ====
First round
4	(United States) Alexa Noel	6^{7}	1
(Poland) Iga Świątek	7^{9}	6
(Guatemala) María Gabriela Rivera Corado	3	1
(Latvia) Daniela Vismane	6	6
(Slovakia) Lenka Stará	4	0
(Georgia (country)) Mariam Dalakishvili	6	6
(Russia) Sofya Lansere	2	1
13	(France) Clara Burel	6	6
10	(Japan) Yuki Naito	6	7^{10}
(Ukraine) Margaryta Bilokin	2	6^{8}
(United States) Katie Volynets	6	6
WC	(France) Yasmine Mansouri	2	3
(United Kingdom) Emma Raducanu	6	6
Q	(Russia) Maria Timofeeva	4	3
(Belarus) Viktoryia Kanapatskaya	5	2
5	(Denmark) Clara Tauson	7	6

Second round
(Poland) I Świątek	6	6
(Latvia) D Vismane	1	2
(Georgia (country)) M Dalakishvili	0	6	4
13	(France) C Burel	6	2	6
10	(Japan) Y Naito	6	4	6
(United States) K Volynets	3	6	3
(United Kingdom) E Raducanu	2	1
5	(Denmark) C Tauson	6	6

Third round
(Poland) I Świątek	6	6
13	(France) C Burel	3	1
10	(Japan) Y Naito	6	6
5	(Denmark) C Tauson	4	4

Quarterfinals
(Poland) I Świątek	7	7
10	(Japan) Y Naito	5	5

=== Bottom half ===
==== Section 3 ====
First round
7	(Japan) Naho Sato	4	4
(Ukraine) Viktoriia Dema	6	6
(United States) Gabriella Price	4	4
(Chinese Taipei) Joanna Garland	6	6
Q	(Russia) Oksana Selekhmeteva	7	6
WC	(France) Mylène Halemai	5	1
LL	(Hong Kong) Cody Wong Hong-yi	4	2
11	(China) Zheng Qinwen	6	6
15	(Canada) Leylah Annie Fernandez	6	6
LL	(Switzerland) Joanne Züger	2	3
Q	(United States) Peyton Stearns	4	2
(Russia) Kamilla Rakhimova	6	6
(Switzerland) Simona Waltert	2	7	2
WC	(France) Salma Djoubri	6	5	6
(Republic of Ireland) Georgia Drummy	3	3
3	(Colombia) Camila Osorio	6	6

Second round
(Ukraine) V Dema	3	3
(Chinese Taipei) J Garland	6	6
Q	(Russia) O Selekhmeteva	4	4
11	(China) Q Zheng	6	6
15	(Canada) LA Fernandez	6	7^{7}
(Russia) K Rakhimova	1	6^{4}
WC	(France) S Djoubri	4	1
3	(Colombia) C Osorio	6	6

Third round
(Chinese Taipei) J Garland	6	4	6
11	(China) Q Zheng	0	6	4
15	(Canada) LA Fernandez	6	6
3	(Colombia) C Osorio	4	4

Quarterfinals
(Chinese Taipei) J Garland	4	1
15	(Canada) LA Fernandez	6	6

==== Section 4 ====
First round
6	(Luxembourg) Eléonora Molinaro	4	6	6
WC	(France) Manon Léonard	6	0	2
Q	(Russia) Elina Avanesyan	6	6^{3}	6
(Hungary) Adrienn Nagy	4	7^{7}	4
(United States) Lea Ma	7^{7}	6
(Georgia (country)) Ana Makatsaria	6^{5}	2
(France) Diane Parry	5	4
9	(Italy) Elisabetta Cocciaretto	7	6
16	(United States) Coco Gauff	6	6
SE	(Poland) Stefania Rogozińska Dzik	3	0
SE	(Argentina) Ana Geller	6^{1}	5
(Burundi) Sada Nahimana	7^{7}	7
WC	(France) Loudmilla Bencheikh	7	6^{7}	1
(Japan) Moyuka Uchijima	5	7^{9}	6
Q	(Russia) Varvara Gracheva	3	6^{5}
2	(China) Wang Xinyu	6	7^{7}

Second round
6	(Luxembourg) E Molinaro	6	6
Q	(Russia) E Avanesyan	2	2
(United States) L Ma	3	5
9	(Italy) E Cocciaretto	6	7
16	(United States) C Gauff	6	6
(Burundi) S Nahimana	3	1
(Japan) M Uchijima	2	1
2	(China) Xin Wang	6	6

Third round
6	(Luxembourg) E Molinaro	3	6	6
9	(Italy) E Cocciaretto	6	3	3
16	(United States) C Gauff	6	6
2	(China) Xin Wang	4	4

Quarterfinals
6	(Luxembourg) E Molinaro	2	6^{1}
16	(United States) C Gauff	6	7^{7}

== Qualifying ==
=== Seeds ===
1. (Russia) Elina Avanesyan (qualified)
2. (Russia) Taisya Pachkaleva (qualified)
3. (Russia) Maria Timofeeva (qualified)
4. (Spain) Marta Custic (first round)
5. (United States) Peyton Stearns (qualified)
6. (Ukraine) Daria Snigur (first round)
7. (Malta) Francesca Curmi (qualified)
8. (Poland) Anna Hertel (first round)
9. (Turkey) Selin Övünç (qualifying competition)
10. (Italy) Melania Delai (qualifying competition)
11. (Hong Kong) Cody Wong Hong-yi (qualifying competition; Lucky loser)
12. (Russia) Daria Frayman (qualifying competition)
13. (Colombia) Laura Sofía Rico García (first round)
14. (United States) Chloe Beck (first round)
15. (Spain) Paula Arias Manjón (first round)
16. (Sweden) Caijsa Hennemann (first round)

=== Qualifiers ===
1. (Russia) Elina Avanesyan
2. (Russia) Taisya Pachkaleva
3. (Russia) Maria Timofeeva
4. (France) Alice Tubello
5. (United States) Peyton Stearns
6. (Russia) Oksana Selekhmeteva
7. (Malta) Francesca Curmi
8. (Russia) Varvara Gracheva

=== Lucky losers ===
1. (Hong Kong) Cody Wong Hong-yi
2. (Switzerland) Joanne Züger

=== Draw ===
==== First qualifier ====
First round
1	(Russia) Elina Avanesyan	6	6
WC	(France) Giulia Morlet	4	2
(Denmark) Hannah Viller Møller	6	6
16	(Sweden) Caijsa Hennemann	4	3

Qualifying competition
1	(Russia) Elina Avanesyan	6	6
(Denmark) Hannah Viller Møller	1	1

==== Second qualifier ====
First round
2	(Russia) Taisya Pachkaleva	6	2	6
(Gabon) Célestine Avomo Ella	3	6	2
(Switzerland) Joanne Züger	7	6
14	(United States) Chloe Beck	5	2

Qualifying competition
2	(Russia) Taisya Pachkaleva	6	6
(Switzerland) Joanne Züger	4	0

==== Third qualifier ====
First round
3	(Russia) Maria Timofeeva	6	6
(Austria) Sinja Kraus	4	1
WC	(Czech Republic) Linda Nosková	5	4
11	(Hong Kong) Cody Wong Hong-yi	7	6

Qualifying competition
3	(Russia) Maria Timofeeva	6	6
11	(Hong Kong) Cody Wong Hong-yi	2	4

==== Fourth qualifier ====
First round
4	(Spain) Marta Custic	4	2
WC	(France) Alice Tubello	6	6
(Japan) Anri Nagata	1	0
12	(Russia) Daria Frayman	6	6

Qualifying competition
WC	(France) Alice Tubello	6	6
12	(Russia) Daria Frayman	3	1

==== Fifth qualifier ====
First round
5	(United States) Peyton Stearns	4	6	6
WC	(France) Sophia Biolay	6	2	0
WC	(Philippines) Alexandra Eala	6	6
15	(Spain) Paula Arias Manjón	4	4

Qualifying competition
5	(United States) Peyton Stearns	6	6
WC	(Philippines) Alexandra Eala	2	4

==== Sixth qualifier ====
First round
6	(Ukraine) Daria Snigur	4	3
(Russia) Oksana Selekhmeteva	6	6
(Japan) Natsumi Kawaguchi	5	0
10	(Italy) Melania Delai	7	6

Qualifying competition
(Russia) Oksana Selekhmeteva	6	6
10	(Italy) Melania Delai	0	2

==== Seventh qualifier ====
First round
7	(Malta) Francesca Curmi	6^{1}	6	6
(Switzerland) Leonie Küng	7^{7}	3	2
WC	(France) Carole Monnet	3	0^{r}
9	(Turkey) Selin Övünç	6	3

Qualifying competition
7	(Malta) Francesca Curmi	6	6
9	(Turkey) Selin Övünç	1	3

==== Eighth qualifier ====
First round
8	(Poland) Anna Hertel	3	2
(Slovakia) Viktória Morvayová	6	6
(Russia) Varvara Gracheva	6	2	6
13	(Colombia) Laura Sofía Rico García	3	6	3

Qualifying competition
(Slovakia) Viktória Morvayová	3	1
(Russia) Varvara Gracheva	6	6
