= 2018 French Open – Wheelchair men's singles =

Wheelchair men's singles
- 2018 French Open

Final
- Champion: (Japan) Shingo Kunieda
- Runner-up: (Argentina) Gustavo Fernández
- Score: 7–6^{(7–5)}, 6–0

Events
Singles	men	women		boys	girls
Doubles	men	women	mixed	boys	girls
WC Singles	men	women	quad
WC Doubles	men	women	quad
Legends	−45	45+	women
- French Open

Shingo Kunieda defeated Gustavo Fernández in the final, 7–6^{(7–5)}, 6–0 to win the men's singles wheelchair tennis title at the 2018 French Open. It was his seventh French Open singles title and 22nd major singles title overall.

Alfie Hewett was the defending champion, but was defeated by Gordon Reid in the quarterfinals.

== Seeds ==
1. (United Kingdom) Alfie Hewett (quarterfinals)
2. (Argentina) Gustavo Fernández (final)

== Draw ==
Key

- Q = Qualifier
- WC = Wild card
- LL = Lucky loser
- Alt = Alternate
- ITF = ITF entry
- PR = Protected ranking
- SR = Special ranking
- SE = Special exempt
- JE = Junior exempt
- JR = Junior Accelerator Programme entrant
- CO = College Accelerator Programme entrant
- NG = Next Gen Accelerator Program entrant
- w/o = Walkover
- r = Retired
- d = Defaulted

=== Finals ===
Quarterfinals
1	(United Kingdom) Alfie Hewett	4	4
(United Kingdom) Gordon Reid	6	6
(Japan) Shingo Kunieda	6	6
(Sweden) Stefan Olsson	1	1
WC	(France) Frédéric Cattaneo	2	4
(France) Stéphane Houdet	6	6
(France) Nicolas Peifer	6	5	5
2	(Argentina) Gustavo Fernández	3	7	7

Semifinals
(United Kingdom) Gordon Reid	2	0
(Japan) Shingo Kunieda	6	6
(France) Stéphane Houdet	1	7^{7}	3
2	(Argentina) Gustavo Fernández	6	6^{4}	6

Final
(Japan) Shingo Kunieda	7^{7}	6
2	(Argentina) Gustavo Fernández	6^{5}	0
