= 2018 French Open – Wheelchair women's doubles =

Wheelchair women's doubles
- 2018 French Open

Final
- Champions: (Netherlands) Diede de Groot (Netherlands) Aniek van Koot
- Runners-up: (Netherlands) Marjolein Buis (Japan) Yui Kamiji
- Score: 6–1, 6–3

Events
Singles	men	women		boys	girls
Doubles	men	women	mixed	boys	girls
WC Singles	men	women	quad
WC Doubles	men	women	quad
Legends	−45	45+	women
- French Open

Diede de Groot and Aniek van Koot defeated the defending champions Marjolein Buis and Yui Kamiji in the final, 6–1, 6–3 to win the women's doubles wheelchair tennis title at the 2018 French Open.

== Seeds ==
1. (Netherlands) Marjolein Buis / (Japan) Yui Kamiji (final)
2. (Netherlands) Diede de Groot / (Netherlands) Aniek van Koot (champions)

== Draw ==
Key

- Q = Qualifier
- WC = Wild card
- LL = Lucky loser
- Alt = Alternate
- ITF = ITF entry
- PR = Protected ranking
- SR = Special ranking
- SE = Special exempt
- JE = Junior exempt
- JR = Junior Accelerator Programme entrant
- CO = College Accelerator Programme entrant
- NG = Next Gen Accelerator Program entrant
- w/o = Walkover
- r = Retired
- d = Defaulted

=== Finals ===
Semifinals
1	(Netherlands) Marjolein Buis (Japan) Yui Kamiji	6	7^{7}
(Germany) Sabine Ellerbrock (Germany) Katharina Krüger	4	6^{1}
(France) Charlotte Famin (South Africa) Kgothatso Montjane	0	0
2	(Netherlands) Diede de Groot (Netherlands) Aniek van Koot	6	6

Final
1	(Netherlands) Marjolein Buis (Japan) Yui Kamiji	1	3
2	(Netherlands) Diede de Groot (Netherlands) Aniek van Koot	6	6
