= 2018 French Open – Boys' singles =

Boys' singles
- 2018 French Open

Final
- Champion: (Chinese Taipei) Tseng Chun-hsin
- Runner-up: (Argentina) Sebastián Báez
- Score: 7–6^{(7–5)}, 6–2

Events
| Singles | men | women | | boys | girls |
| Doubles | men | women | mixed | boys | girls |
| WC Singles | men | women | quad |
| WC Doubles | men | women | quad |
| Legends | −45 | 45+ | women |
| ← 2017 · | French Open | · 2019 → |

Tseng Chun-hsin won the boys' singles tennis title at the 2018 French Open, defeating Sebastián Báez in the final, 7–6^{(7–5)}, 6–2.

Alexei Popyrin was the defending champion, but was no longer eligible to participate in junior tournaments.

== Seeds ==
1. (Argentina) Sebastián Báez (final)
2. (United States) Sebastian Korda (semifinals)
3. (Germany) Rudolf Molleker (first round)
4. (Chinese Taipei) Tseng Chun-hsin (champion)
5. (France) Hugo Gaston (first round)
6. (Kazakhstan) Timofei Skatov (third round)
7. (Bulgaria) Adrian Andreev (third round)
8. (Brazil) Thiago Seyboth Wild (semifinals)

9. (Colombia) Nicolás Mejía (quarterfinals)
10. (Czech Republic) Dalibor Svrčina (first round)
11. (United States) Tristan Boyer (third round)
12. (France) Clément Tabur (first round)
13. (United Kingdom) Aidan McHugh (first round)
14. (Argentina) Juan Manuel Cerúndolo (first round)
15. (Argentina) Facundo Díaz Acosta (first round)
16. (United States) Drew Baird (first round)

Click on the seed number of a player to go to their draw section.

== Draw ==
Key

- Q = Qualifier
- WC = Wild card
- LL = Lucky loser
- Alt = Alternate
- ITF = ITF entry
- PR = Protected ranking
- SR = Special ranking
- SE = Special exempt
- JE = Junior exempt
- JR = Junior Accelerator Programme entrant
- CO = College Accelerator Programme entrant
- NG = Next Gen Accelerator Program entrant
- w/o = Walkover
- r = Retired
- d = Defaulted

=== Finals ===
Quarterfinals
1 | (Argentina) Sebastián Báez | 1 | 7^{7} | 7
(Dominican Republic) Nick Hardt | 6 | 6^{5} | 5
SE | (United States) Brandon Nakashima | 1 | 4
8 | (Brazil) Thiago Seyboth Wild | 6 | 6
9 | (Colombia) Nicolás Mejía | 2 | 3
4 | (Chinese Taipei) Tseng Chun-hsin | 6 | 6
(Spain) Carlos López Montagud | 2 | 3
2 | (United States) Sebastian Korda | 6 | 6

Semifinals
1 | (Argentina) Sebastián Báez | 6 | 6
8 | (Brazil) Thiago Seyboth Wild | 2 | 2
4 | (Chinese Taipei) Tseng Chun-hsin | 6 | 7
2 | (United States) Sebastian Korda | 2 | 5

Final
1 | (Argentina) Sebastián Báez | 6^{5} | 2
4 | (Chinese Taipei) Tseng Chun-hsin | 7^{7} | 6

=== Top half ===
==== Section 1 ====
First round
1 | (Argentina) Sebastián Báez | 6^{9} | 6 | 6
WC | (France) Mathys Erhard | 7^{11} | 3 | 0
(Japan) Naoki Tajima | 7 | 3 | 6
(Serbia) Marko Miladinović | 5 | 6 | 4
(Romania) Filip Cristian Jianu | 6 | 1 | 6
Q | (Spain) Carlos Sánchez Jover | 2 | 6 | 4
Q | (France) Kyrian Jacquet | 6 | 3 | 6
16 | (United States) Drew Baird | 3 | 6 | 2
10 | (Czech Republic) Dalibor Svrčina | 3 | 6 | 3
(Chinese Taipei) Ray Ho | 6 | 3 | 6
(United States) Andrew Fenty | 6 | 1 | 6
Q | (Croatia) Admir Kalender | 2 | 6 | 1
Q | (Brazil) Mateus Alves | 7^{7} | 6
(South Africa) Philip Henning | 6^{2} | 2
(Dominican Republic) Nick Hardt | 4 | 6 | 6
5 | (France) Hugo Gaston | 6 | 1 | 0

Second round
1 | (Argentina) S Báez | 3 | 6 | 6
(Japan) N Tajima | 6 | 2 | 2
(Romania) FC Jianu | 1 | 6 | 2
Q | (France) K Jacquet | 6 | 3 | 6
(Chinese Taipei) R Ho | 6 | 6
(United States) A Fenty | 2 | 2
Q | (Brazil) M Alves | 1 | 7 | 2
(Dominican Republic) N Hardt | 6 | 5 | 6

Third round
1 | (Argentina) S Báez | 6 | 4
Q | (France) K Jacquet | 2 | 2^{r}
(Chinese Taipei) R Ho | 4 | 2
(Dominican Republic) N Hardt | 6 | 6

Quarterfinals
1 | (Argentina) S Báez | 1 | 7^{7} | 7
(Dominican Republic) N Hardt | 6 | 6^{5} | 5

==== Section 2 ====
First round
3 | (Germany) Rudolf Molleker | 4 | 6 | 3
SE | (United States) Brandon Nakashima | 6 | 4 | 6
(Belgium) Arnaud Bovy | 3 | 6 | 6^{5}
(Australia) Rinky Hijikata | 6 | 4 | 7^{7}
(Netherlands) Jesper de Jong | 6 | 4 | 7
(Poland) Daniel Michalski | 4 | 6 | 5
WC | (France) Antoine Cornut-Chauvinc | 6 | 4 | 6
13 | (United Kingdom) Aidan McHugh | 3 | 6 | 4
11 | (United States) Tristan Boyer | 7 | 7^{7}
Q | (France) Luka Pavlovic | 5 | 6^{4}
Q | (Uzbekistan) Sergey Fomin | 6 | 3 | 6
(Czech Republic) Ondřej Štyler | 2 | 6 | 4
(Italy) Lorenzo Musetti | 3 | 2
(South Korea) Park Ui-sung | 6 | 6
(Argentina) Thiago Agustín Tirante | 3 | 2
8 | (Brazil) Thiago Seyboth Wild | 6 | 6

Second round
SE | (United States) B Nakashima | 6 | 6
(Australia) R Hijikata | 3 | 2
(Netherlands) J de Jong | 2 | 6 | 2
WC | (France) A Cornut-Chauvinc | 6 | 2 | 6
11 | (United States) T Boyer | 5 | 6 | 6
Q | (Uzbekistan) S Fomin | 7 | 2 | 3
(South Korea) U-s Park | 4 | 1
8 | (Brazil) T Seyboth Wild | 6 | 6

Third round
SE | (United States) B Nakashima | 7^{7} | 6
WC | (France) A Cornut-Chauvinc | 6^{3} | 4
11 | (United States) T Boyer | 1 | 3
8 | (Brazil) T Seyboth Wild | 6 | 6

Quarterfinals
SE | (United States) B Nakashima | 1 | 4
8 | (Brazil) T Seyboth Wild | 6 | 6

=== Bottom half ===
==== Section 3 ====
First round
6 | (Kazakhstan) Timofey Skatov | 7 | 6
WC | (Brazil) Mateo Barreiros Reyes | 5 | 2
WC | (France) Rayane Roumane | 2 | 6 | 3
Q | (Poland) Wojciech Marek | 6 | 3 | 6
WC | (United States) Cannon Kingsley | 7^{7} | 6
(Czech Republic) Jonáš Forejtek | 6^{4} | 1
(China) Mu Tao | 3 | 4
9 | (Colombia) Nicolás Mejía | 6 | 6
14 | (Argentina) Juan Manuel Cerúndolo | 6 | 4 | 1
SE | (Brazil) João Lucas Reis da Silva | 4 | 6 | 6
(United States) Trey Hilderbrand | 3 | 3
WC | (France) Jaimee Floyd Angele | 6 | 6
(Spain) Nicolás Álvarez Varona | 6 | 7^{7}
(United Kingdom) Jack Draper | 2 | 6^{3}
WC | (France) Harold Mayot | 3 | 2
4 | (Chinese Taipei) Tseng Chun-hsin | 6 | 6

Second round
6 | (Kazakhstan) T Skatov | 2 | 6 | 6
Q | (Poland) W Marek | 6 | 3 | 1
WC | (United States) C Kingsley | 6 | 4 | 4
9 | (Colombia) N Mejía | 1 | 6 | 6
SE | (Brazil) JL Reis da Silva | 6 | 6
WC | (France) JF Angele | 4 | 4
(Spain) N Álvarez Varona | 2 | 4
4 | (Chinese Taipei) C-h Tseng | 6 | 6

Third round
6 | (Kazakhstan) T Skatov | 1 | 4
9 | (Colombia) N Mejía | 6 | 6
SE | (Brazil) JL Reis da Silva | 1 | 1
4 | (Chinese Taipei) C-h Tseng | 6 | 6

Quarterfinals
9 | (Colombia) N Mejía | 2 | 3
4 | (Chinese Taipei) C-h Tseng | 6 | 6

==== Section 4 ====
First round
7 | (Bulgaria) Adrian Andreev | 6 | 7^{8}
(France) Arthur Cazaux | 2 | 6^{6}
Q | (United States) Tyler Zink | 2 | 4
(Brazil) Gilbert Soares Klier Júnior | 6 | 6
(Israel) Yshai Oliel | 6 | 4 | 3
(Spain) Carlos López Montagud | 1 | 6 | 6
(Russia) Alexey Zakharov | 7^{9} | 4 | 6
12 | (France) Clément Tabur | 6^{7} | 6 | 3
15 | (Argentina) Facundo Díaz Acosta | 3 | 4
(Turkey) Yankı Erel | 6 | 6
(Netherlands) Deney Wassermann | 4 | 6 | 6
(United Kingdom) George Loffhagen | 6 | 4 | 4
(Czech Republic) Jiří Lehečka | 6 | 3 | 6^{3}
(Romania) Ștefan Paloși | 4 | 6 | 7^{7}
WC | (France) Valentin Royer | 2 | 6^{2}
2 | (United States) Sebastian Korda | 6 | 7^{7}

Second round
7 | (Bulgaria) A Andreev | 6 | 6
(Brazil) G Soares Klier Júnior | 4 | 1
(Spain) C López Montagud | 3 | 6 | 7
(Russia) A Zakharov | 6 | 3 | 5
(Turkey) Y Erel | 4 | 5
(Netherlands) D Wassermann | 6 | 7
(Romania) Ș Paloși | 1 | 4
2 | (United States) S Korda | 6 | 6

Third round
7 | (Bulgaria) A Andreev | 5 | 1
(Spain) C López Montagud | 7 | 6
(Netherlands) D Wassermann | 6 | 6^{3} | 3
2 | (United States) S Korda | 4 | 7^{7} | 6

Quarterfinals
(Spain) C López Montagud | 2 | 3
2 | (United States) S Korda | 6 | 6

== Qualifying ==
=== Seeds ===
1. (United States) Tyler Zink (qualified)
2. (Germany) Leopold Zima (first round)
3. (Brazil) Mateus Alves (qualified)
4. (United States) Emilio Nava (first round)
5. (Finland) Otto Virtanen (first round)
6. (Poland) Wojciech Marek (qualified)
7. (Argentina) Alejo Lorenzo Lingua Lavallén (first round)
8. (Uzbekistan) Sergey Fomin (qualified)
9. (France) Titouan Droguet (qualifying competition)
10. (United States) Govind Nanda (qualifying competition)
11. (Kazakhstan) Dostanbek Tashbulatov (qualifying competition)
12. (Brazil) Igor Gimenez (first round)
13. (Russia) Alexandr Binda (first round)
14. (Croatia) Admir Kalender (qualified)
15. (United Kingdom) Jacob Fearnley (first round)
16. (India) Siddhant Banthia (first round)

=== Qualifiers ===
1. (United States) Tyler Zink
2. (Croatia) Admir Kalender
3. (Brazil) Mateus Alves
4. (Spain) Carlos Sánchez Jover
5. (France) Luka Pavlovic
6. (Poland) Wojciech Marek
7. (France) Kyrian Jacquet
8. (Uzbekistan) Sergey Fomin

=== Draw ===
==== First qualifier ====
First round
1 | (United States) Tyler Zink | 6 | 6
(Malaysia) Christian Didier Chin | 2 | 1
WC | (France) Lilian Marmousez | 7 | 6
13 | (Russia) Alexandr Binda | 5 | 2

Qualifying competition
1 | (United States) Tyler Zink | 1 | 6 | 6
WC | (France) Lilian Marmousez | 6 | 3 | 1

==== Second qualifier ====
First round
2 | (Germany) Leopold Zima | 1 | 0
(United States) William Woodall | 6 | 6
(Brazil) João Ferreira | 7^{7} | 3 | 2
14 | (Croatia) Admir Kalender | 6^{4} | 6 | 6

Qualifying competition
(United States) William Woodall | 6 | 3 | 4
14 | (Croatia) Admir Kalender | 2 | 6 | 6

==== Third qualifier ====
First round
3 | (Brazil) Mateus Alves | 6 | 6
WC | (France) Térence Atmane | 1 | 1
(Italy) Davide Tortora | 6 | 6
15 | (United Kingdom) Jacob Fearnley | 1 | 2

Qualifying competition
3 | (Brazil) Mateus Alves | 6 | 6
(Italy) Davide Tortora | 4 | 4

==== Fourth qualifier ====
First round
4 | (United States) Emilio Nava | 4 | 5
(Spain) Carlos Sánchez Jover | 6 | 7
(South Korea) Han Seong-yong | 2 | 1
9 | (France) Titouan Droguet | 6 | 6

Qualifying competition
(Spain) Carlos Sánchez Jover | 7^{7} | 7
9 | (France) Titouan Droguet | 6^{4} | 5

==== Fifth qualifier ====
First round
5 | (Finland) Otto Virtanen | 6^{8} | 4
WC | (France) Luka Pavlovic | 7^{10} | 6
(Netherlands) Lodewijk Weststrate | 6 | 7^{10}
12 | (Brazil) Igor Gimenez | 3 | 6^{8}

Qualifying competition
WC | (France) Luka Pavlovic | 6 | 6
(Netherlands) Lodewijk Weststrate | 1 | 4

==== Sixth qualifier ====
First round
6 | (Poland) Wojciech Marek | 6 | 6
(United States) Keenan Mayo | 2 | 0
WC | (France) Baptiste Anselmo | 1 | 4
11 | (Kazakhstan) Dostanbek Tashbulatov | 6 | 6

Qualifying competition
6 | (Poland) Wojciech Marek | 6 | 2 | 6
11 | (Kazakhstan) Dostanbek Tashbulatov | 1 | 6 | 3

==== Seventh qualifier ====
First round
7 | (Argentina) Alejo Lorenzo Lingua Lavallén | 5 | 6^{8}
WC | (France) Kyrian Jacquet | 7 | 7^{10}
(Belgium) Louis Herman | 6^{2} | 0
10 | (United States) Govind Nanda | 7^{7} | 6

Qualifying competition
WC | (France) Kyrian Jacquet | 6 | 2 | 6
10 | (United States) Govind Nanda | 2 | 6 | 3

==== Eighth qualifier ====
First round
8 | (Uzbekistan) Sergey Fomin | 6^{4} | 7^{7} | 7^{7}
(Japan) Taisei Ichikawa | 7^{7} | 6^{0} | 6^{4}
WC | (France) Maxence Beaugé | 6 | 7
16 | (India) Siddhant Banthia | 3 | 5

Qualifying competition
8 | (Uzbekistan) Sergey Fomin | 6 | 3 | 7^{10}
WC | (France) Maxence Beaugé | 4 | 6 | 6^{8}
