= 2018 French Open – Boys' doubles =

Boys' doubles
- 2018 French Open

Final
- Champions: (Czech Republic) Ondřej Štyler (Japan) Naoki Tajima
- Runners-up: (Chinese Taipei) Ray Ho (Chinese Taipei) Tseng Chun-hsin
- Score: 6–4, 6–4

Events
Singles	men	women		boys	girls
Doubles	men	women	mixed	boys	girls
WC Singles	men	women	quad
WC Doubles	men	women	quad
Legends	−45	45+	women
← 2017 ·	French Open	· 2019 →

Ondřej Štyler and Naoki Tajima won the boys' doubles tennis title at the 2018 French Open, defeating Ray Ho and Tseng Chun-hsin in the final, 6–4, 6–4.

Nicola Kuhn and Zsombor Piros were the defending champions, however Kuhn chose not to participate, while Piros is no longer eligible to participate in junior tournaments.

== Seeds ==
1. (Argentina) Sebastián Báez / (Brazil) Thiago Seyboth Wild (semifinals)
2. (France) Hugo Gaston / (France) Clément Tabur (semifinals)
3. (United Kingdom) Aidan McHugh / (Kazakhstan) Timofei Skatov (second round)
4. (United States) Drew Baird / (Colombia) Nicolás Mejía (second round)
5. (Chinese Taipei) Ray Ho / (Chinese Taipei) Tseng Chun-hsin (final)
6. (United States) Andrew Fenty / (South Korea) Park Ui-sung (second round)
7. (Dominican Republic) Nick Hardt / (Romania) Filip Cristian Jianu (first round)
8. (Czech Republic) Jonáš Forejtek / (Czech Republic) Dalibor Svrčina (second round)

== Draw ==
=== Key ===
- Q = Qualifier
- WC = Wild card
- LL = Lucky loser
- Alt = Alternate
- ITF = ITF entry
- PR = Protected ranking
- SR = Special ranking
- SE = Special exempt
- JE = Junior exempt
- JR = Junior Accelerator Programme entrant
- CO = College Accelerator Programme entrant
- NG = Next Gen Accelerator Program entrant
- w/o = Walkover
- r = Retired
- d = Defaulted

=== Finals ===
Semifinals
1	(Argentina) Sebastián Báez (Brazil) Thiago Seyboth Wild	2	1
(Czech Republic) Ondřej Štyler (Japan) Naoki Tajima	6	6
5	(Chinese Taipei) Ray Ho (Chinese Taipei) Tseng Chun-hsin	6	5	[10]
2	(France) Hugo Gaston (France) Clément Tabur	0	7	[5]

Final
(Czech Republic) Ondřej Štyler (Japan) Naoki Tajima	6	6
5	(Chinese Taipei) Ray Ho (Chinese Taipei) Tseng Chun-hsin	4	4

=== Top half ===
First round
1	(Argentina) Sebastián Báez (Brazil) Thiago Seyboth Wild	6	2	[10]
(United States) Sebastian Korda (United States) Emilio Nava	4	6	[8]
WC	(France) Maxence Beaugé (France) Antoine Cornut-Chauvinc	6^{2}	3
(Argentina) Juan Manuel Cerúndolo (United States) Tyler Zink	7^{7}	6
(Croatia) Admir Kalender (Spain) Carlos Sánchez Jover	2	2
(Italy) Lorenzo Musetti (Netherlands) Deney Wassermann	6	6
(Germany) Rudolf Molleker (Russia) Alexey Zakharov	3	3
8	(Czech Republic) Jonáš Forejtek (Czech Republic) Dalibor Svrčina	6	6
4	(United States) Drew Baird (Colombia) Nicolás Mejía	6	6^{7}	[10]
(France) Arthur Cazaux (France) Titouan Droguet	1	7^{9}	[5]
(United States) Cannon Kingsley (United States) Brandon Nakashima	6	3	[10]
(Netherlands) Jesper de Jong (Turkey) Yankı Erel	4	6	[12]
(Czech Republic) Ondřej Štyler (Japan) Naoki Tajima	6	6
(South Africa) Philip Henning (Czech Republic) Jiří Lehečka	3	1
WC	(France) Harold Mayot (France) Valentin Royer	1	6	[11]
7	(Dominican Republic) Nick Hardt (Romania) Filip Cristian Jianu	6	4	[9]

Second round
1	(Argentina) S Báez (Brazil) T Seyboth Wild	4	6	[10]
(Argentina) JM Cerúndolo (United States) T Zink	6	1	[6]
(Italy) L Musetti (Netherlands) D Wassermann	7	6
8	(Czech Republic) J Forejtek (Czech Republic) D Svrčina	5	1
4	(United States) D Baird (Colombia) N Mejía	4	2
(Netherlands) J de Jong (Turkey) Y Erel	6	6
(Czech Republic) O Štyler (Japan) N Tajima	6	6
WC	(France) H Mayot (France) V Royer	3	3

Quarterfinals
1	(Argentina) S Báez (Brazil) T Seyboth Wild	6	1	[10]
(Italy) L Musetti (Netherlands) D Wassermann	3	6	[8]
(Netherlands) J de Jong (Turkey) Y Erel	5	1
(Czech Republic) O Štyler (Japan) N Tajima	7	6

Semifinals
1	(Argentina) S Báez (Brazil) T Seyboth Wild	2	1
(Czech Republic) O Štyler (Japan) N Tajima	6	6

=== Bottom half ===
First round
5	(Chinese Taipei) Ray Ho (Chinese Taipei) Tseng Chun-hsin	7^{7}	6
(Belgium) Arnaud Bovy (Romania) Ștefan Paloși	6^{5}	3
(Uzbekistan) Sergey Fomin (China) Mu Tao	4	5
(Argentina) Facundo Díaz Acosta (Argentina) Thiago Agustín Tirante	6	7
WC	(France) Baptiste Anselmo (France) Émilien Voisin	6	7
(United States) Tristan Boyer (United Kingdom) George Loffhagen	4	5
Alt	(Israel) Yshai Oliel (United States) William Woodall	2	4
3	(United Kingdom) Aidan McHugh (Kazakhstan) Timofei Skatov	6	6
6	(United States) Andrew Fenty (South Korea) Park Ui-sung	7^{8}	4	[13]
WC	(France) Mathys Erhard (France) Lilian Marmousez	6^{6}	6	[11]
(United States) Trey Hilderbrand (United States) Govind Nanda	6	6^{5}	[7]
(Spain) Nicolás Álvarez Varona (Spain) Carlos López Montagud	2	7^{7}	[10]
(Brazil) João Lucas Reis da Silva (Brazil) Gilbert Soares Klier Júnior	6	3	[10]
(Bulgaria) Adrian Andreev (United States) Keenan Mayo	2	6	[6]
(Brazil) Mateus Alves (Poland) Wojciech Marek	5	2
2	(France) Hugo Gaston (France) Clément Tabur	7	6

Second round
5	(Chinese Taipei) R Ho (Chinese Taipei) C-h Tseng	6	6
(Argentina) F Díaz Acosta (Argentina) TA Tirante	1	4
WC	(France) B Anselmo (France) É Voisin	6	6
3	(United Kingdom) A McHugh (Kazakhstan) T Skatov	4	2
6	(United States) A Fenty (South Korea) U-s Park	3	6	[7]
(Spain) N Álvarez Varona (Spain) C López Montagud	6	3	[10]
(Brazil) JL Reis da Silva (Brazil) G Soares Klier Júnior
2	(France) H Gaston (France) C Tabur	w/o

Quarterfinals
5	(Chinese Taipei) R Ho (Chinese Taipei) C-h Tseng	5	7^{7}	[10]
WC	(France) B Anselmo (France) É Voisin	7	6^{1}	[6]
(Spain) N Álvarez Varona (Spain) C López Montagud	0	4
2	(France) H Gaston (France) C Tabur	6	6

Semifinals
5	(Chinese Taipei) R Ho (Chinese Taipei) C-h Tseng	6	5	[10]
2	(France) H Gaston (France) C Tabur	0	7	[5]
