= 2018 French Open – Wheelchair women's singles =

Wheelchair women's singles
- 2018 French Open

Final
- Champion: (Japan) Yui Kamiji
- Runner-up: (Netherlands) Diede de Groot
- Score: 2–6, 6–0, 6–2

Events
Singles	men	women		boys	girls
Doubles	men	women	mixed	boys	girls
WC Singles	men	women	quad
WC Doubles	men	women	quad
Legends	−45	45+	women
- French Open

Defending champion Yui Kamiji defeated Diede de Groot in the final, 2–6, 6–0, 6–2 to win the women's singles wheelchair tennis title at the 2018 French Open. It was de Groot's only loss at the majors that year, preventing her from achieving the Grand Slam.

== Seeds ==
1. (Japan) Yui Kamiji (champion)
2. (Netherlands) Diede de Groot (final)

== Draw ==
Key

- Q = Qualifier
- WC = Wild card
- LL = Lucky loser
- Alt = Alternate
- ITF = ITF entry
- PR = Protected ranking
- SR = Special ranking
- SE = Special exempt
- JE = Junior exempt
- JR = Junior Accelerator Programme entrant
- CO = College Accelerator Programme entrant
- NG = Next Gen Accelerator Program entrant
- w/o = Walkover
- r = Retired
- d = Defaulted

=== Finals ===
Quarterfinals
1	(Japan) Yui Kamiji	6	6
WC	(France) Charlotte Famin	1	2
(Netherlands) Aniek van Koot	6	3	6
(South Africa) Kgothatso Montjane	1	6	1
(Germany) Sabine Ellerbrock	6	7
(Germany) Katharina Krüger	2	5
(Netherlands) Marjolein Buis	2	0
2	(Netherlands) Diede de Groot	6	6

Semifinals
1	(Japan) Yui Kamiji	6	7^{10}
(Netherlands) Aniek van Koot	3	6^{8}
(Germany) Sabine Ellerbrock	3	1
2	(Netherlands) Diede de Groot	6	6

Final
1	(Japan) Yui Kamiji	2	6	6
2	(Netherlands) Diede de Groot	6	0	2
