= 2018 French Open – Wheelchair men's doubles =

Wheelchair men's doubles
- 2018 French Open

Final
- Champions: (France) Stéphane Houdet (France) Nicolas Peifer
- Runners-up: (France) Frédéric Cattaneo (Sweden) Stefan Olsson
- Score: 6–1, 7–6^{(7–5)}

Events
Singles	men	women		boys	girls
Doubles	men	women	mixed	boys	girls
WC Singles	men	women	quad
WC Doubles	men	women	quad
Legends	−45	45+	women
- French Open

Defending champions Stéphane Houdet and Nicolas Peifer defeated Frédéric Cattaneo and Stefan Olsson in the final, 6–1, 7–6^{(7–5)} to win the men's doubles wheelchair tennis title at the 2018 French Open.

== Seeds ==
1. (France) Stéphane Houdet / (France) Nicolas Peifer (champions)
2. (United Kingdom) Alfie Hewett / (United Kingdom) Gordon Reid (semifinals)

== Draw ==
Key

- Q = Qualifier
- WC = Wild card
- LL = Lucky loser
- Alt = Alternate
- ITF = ITF entry
- PR = Protected ranking
- SR = Special ranking
- SE = Special exempt
- JE = Junior exempt
- JR = Junior Accelerator Programme entrant
- CO = College Accelerator Programme entrant
- NG = Next Gen Accelerator Program entrant
- w/o = Walkover
- r = Retired
- d = Defaulted

=== Finals ===
Semifinals
1	(France) Stéphane Houdet (France) Nicolas Peifer	4	6	[13]
(Argentina) Gustavo Fernández (Japan) Shingo Kunieda	6	3	[11]
(France) Frédéric Cattaneo (Sweden) Stefan Olsson	6	6
2	(United Kingdom) Alfie Hewett (United Kingdom) Gordon Reid	4	4

Final
1	(France) Stéphane Houdet (France) Nicolas Peifer	6	7^{7}
(France) Frédéric Cattaneo (Sweden) Stefan Olsson	1	6^{5}
