= Loudmilla Bencheikh =

French tennis player (born 2001)

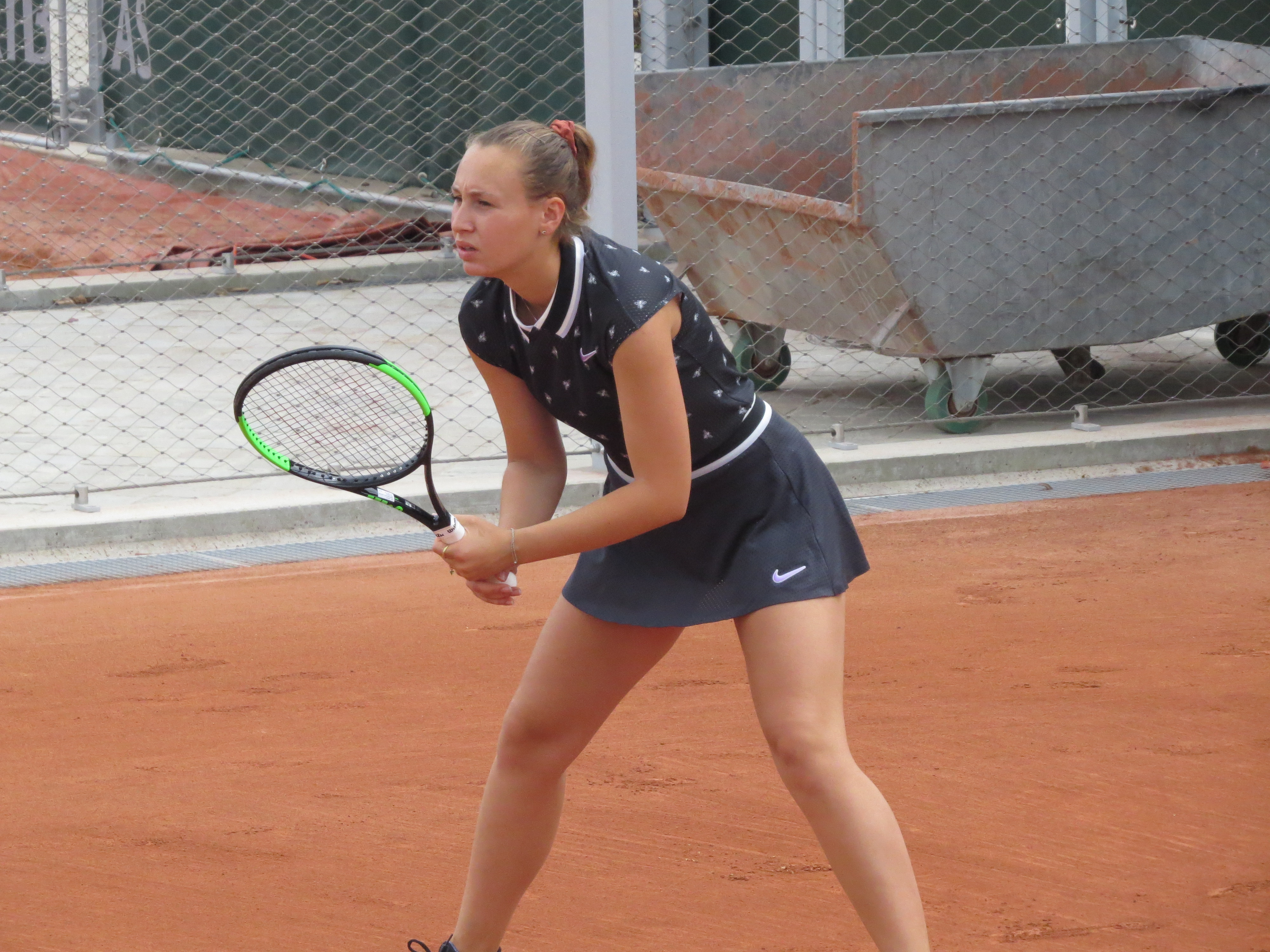
- Country (sports): France
- Born: 29 May 2001 (age 23); Paris, France
- Plays: Right (two-handed backhand)
- Prize money: $32,396

Singles
- Career record: 35–45
- Highest ranking: No. 503 (22 July 2019)

Doubles
- Career record: 24–25
- Career titles: 2 ITF
- Highest ranking: No. 501 (2 March 2020)

Grand Slam doubles results
- French Open: 1R (2019)

Loudmilla Bencheikh (born 29 May 2001) is a French former tennis player.

She has career-high rankings by the Women's Tennis Association (WTA) of 503 in singles and 501 in doubles, and has won two doubles titles on the ITF Circuit.

Bencheikh made her Grand Slam debut at the 2019 French Open, after receiving a wildcard for the doubles main draw, partnering Coco Gauff.

In January 2021, she signed a scholarship to play for the University of Alabama. In June 2021, she played her last match in a French tournament of the ITF Circuit.
