= 2018 French Open – Legends over 45 doubles =

Legends over 45 doubles
- 2018 French Open

Final
- Champions: (France) Mansour Bahrami (France) Fabrice Santoro
- Runners-up: (United States) John McEnroe (France) Cédric Pioline
- Score: 6–1, 2–6, [12–10]

Events
Singles	men	women		boys	girls
Doubles	men	women	mixed	boys	girls
WC Singles	men	women	quad
WC Doubles	men	women	quad
Legends	−45	45+	women
← 2017 ·	French Open	· 2019 →

Mansour Bahrami and Fabrice Santoro were the defending champions, and successfully defended their title, defeating John McEnroe and Cédric Pioline in the final, 6–1, 2–6, [12–10].

== Draw ==
=== Key ===
- Q = Qualifier
- WC = Wild card
- LL = Lucky loser
- Alt = Alternate
- ITF = ITF entry
- PR = Protected ranking
- SR = Special ranking
- SE = Special exempt
- JE = Junior exempt
- JR = Junior Accelerator Programme entrant
- CO = College Accelerator Programme entrant
- NG = Next Gen Accelerator Program entrant
- w/o = Walkover
- r = Retired
- d = Defaulted

=== Final ===
Finals
C1	(United States) John McEnroe (France) Cédric Pioline	1	6	[10]
D1	(France) Mansour Bahrami (France) Fabrice Santoro	6	2	[12]

=== Group C ===
		(United States) J McEnroe (France) C Pioline	(France) H Leconte (United States) M Chang	(Spain) S Bruguera (Morocco) Y El Aynaoui	RR; W–L	Set; W–L	Game; W–L	Standings
C1	(United States) John McEnroe (France) Cédric Pioline		6–2, 7–6^{(7–5)}	6–4, 7–6^{(7–4)}	2–0	4–0	26–18	1
C2	(France) Henri Leconte (United States) Michael Chang	2–6, 6–7^{(5–7)}		4–6, 3–6	0–2	0–4	15–25	3
C3	(Spain) Sergi Bruguera (Morocco) Younes El Aynaoui	4–6, 6–7^{(4–7)}	6–4, 6–3		1–1	2–2	22–20	2

Standings are determined by: 1. number of wins; 2. number of matches; 3. in three-players-ties, percentage of sets won, or of games won; 4. steering-committee decision.

=== Group D ===
		(France) M Bahrami (France) F Santoro	(Sweden) M Pernfors (Sweden) M Wilander	(France) A Boetsch (Australia) P Cash	RR; W–L	Set; W–L	Game; W–L	Standings
D1	(France) Mansour Bahrami (France) Fabrice Santoro		6–2, 6–4	6–3, 2–6, [10–7]	2–0	4–1	21–15	1
D2	(Sweden) Mikael Pernfors (Sweden) Mats Wilander	2–6, 4–6		7–5, 0–0, ret.	0–2	1–2	13–17	3
D3	(France) Arnaud Boetsch (Australia) Pat Cash	3–6, 6–2, [7–10]	5–7, 0–0, ret.		1–1	1–3	14–16	2

Standings are determined by: 1. number of wins; 2. number of matches; 3. in three-players-ties, percentage of sets won, or of games won; 4. steering-committee decision.
