= 2018 French Open – Women's legends doubles =

Women's legends doubles
- 2018 French Open

Final
- Champions: (France) Nathalie Dechy (France) Amélie Mauresmo
- Runners-up: (Belgium) Kim Clijsters (France) Nathalie Tauziat
- Score: 6–7^{(4–7)}, 6–4, [15–13]

Events
Singles	men	women		boys	girls
Doubles	men	women	mixed	boys	girls
WC Singles	men	women	quad
WC Doubles	men	women	quad
Legends	−45	45+	women
← 2017 ·	French Open	· 2019 →

Tracy Austin and Kim Clijsters were the defending champions, but chose not to participate together. Austin played alongside Lindsay Davenport, but they were eliminated in the round robin competition. Clijsters teamed up with Nathalie Tauziat, but were defeated in the final by Nathalie Dechy and Amélie Mauresmo, 6–7^{(4–7)}, 6–4, [15–13].

== Draw ==
=== Key ===
- Q = Qualifier
- WC = Wild card
- LL = Lucky loser
- Alt = Alternate
- ITF = ITF entry
- PR = Protected ranking
- SR = Special ranking
- SE = Special exempt
- JE = Junior exempt
- JR = Junior Accelerator Programme entrant
- CO = College Accelerator Programme entrant
- NG = Next Gen Accelerator Program entrant
- w/o = Walkover
- r = Retired
- d = Defaulted

=== Final ===
Finals
A2	(Belgium) Kim Clijsters (France) Nathalie Tauziat	7^{7}	4	[13]
B2	(France) Nathalie Dechy (France) Amélie Mauresmo	6^{4}	6	[15]

=== Group A ===
		(France) M Bartoli (United States) M Navratilova	(Belgium) K Clijsters (France) N Tauziat	(Croatia) I Majoli (Spain) A Sánchez Vicario	RR; W–L	Set; W–L	Game; W–L	Standings
A1	(France) Marion Bartoli (United States) Martina Navratilova		1–6, 2–6	6–3, 6–3	1–1	2–2	15–18	2
A2	(Belgium) Kim Clijsters (France) Nathalie Tauziat	6–1, 6–2		6–2, 6–4	2–0	4–0	24–9	1
A3	(Croatia) Iva Majoli (Spain) Arantxa Sánchez Vicario	3–6, 3–6	2–6, 4–6		0–2	0–4	12–24	3

Standings are determined by: 1. number of wins; 2. number of matches; 3. in three-players-ties, percentage of sets won, or of games won; 4. steering-committee decision.

=== Group B ===
		(United States) T Austin (United States) L Davenport	(France) N Dechy (France) A Mauresmo	(Spain) C Martínez (France) S Testud	RR; W–L	Set; W–L	Game; W–L	Standings
B1	(United States) Tracy Austin (United States) Lindsay Davenport		2–6, 2–6	6–4, 6–3	1–1	2–2	16–19	2
B2	(France) Nathalie Dechy (France) Amélie Mauresmo	6–2, 6–2		6–4, 6–7^{(5–7)}, [10–7]	2–0	4–1	25–15	1
B3	(Spain) Conchita Martínez (France) Sandrine Testud	4–6, 3–6	4–6, 7–6^{(7–5)}, [7–10]		0–2	1–4	18–25	3

Standings are determined by: 1. number of wins; 2. number of matches; 3. in three-players-ties, percentage of sets won, or of games won; 4. steering-committee decision.
