= 2018 French Open – Mixed doubles =

Mixed doubles
- 2018 French Open

Final
- Champions: (Chinese Taipei) Latisha Chan (Croatia) Ivan Dodig
- Runners-up: (Canada) Gabriela Dabrowski (Croatia) Mate Pavić
- Score: 6–1, 6–7^{(5–7)}, [10–8]

Details
- Draw: 32
- Seeds: 8

Events
Singles	men	women		boys	girls
Doubles	men	women	mixed	boys	girls
WC Singles	men	women	quad
WC Doubles	men	women	quad
Legends	−45	45+	women
- French Open

Gabriela Dabrowski and Rohan Bopanna were the defending champions, but chose not to compete together. Bopanna teamed up with Tímea Babos, but lost in the first round to Zhang Shuai and John Peers. Dabrowski played alongside Mate Pavić, but lost to Latisha Chan and Ivan Dodig in the final, 6–1, 6–7^{(5–7)}, [10–8].

== Seeds ==
1. (Canada) Gabriela Dabrowski / (Croatia) Mate Pavić (final)
2. (Chinese Taipei) Latisha Chan / (Croatia) Ivan Dodig (champions)
3. (China) Xu Yifan / (Austria) Oliver Marach (second round)
4. (Czech Republic) Kateřina Siniaková / (United Kingdom) Jamie Murray (first round)
5. (Slovenia) Andreja Klepač / (Netherlands) Jean-Julien Rojer (second round)
6. (Chinese Taipei) Chan Hao-ching / (New Zealand) Michael Venus (first round)
7. (Hungary) Tímea Babos / (India) Rohan Bopanna (first round)
8. (Germany) Anna-Lena Grönefeld / (Colombia) Robert Farah (semifinals)

== Draw ==
Key

- Q = Qualifier
- WC = Wild card
- LL = Lucky loser
- Alt = Alternate
- ITF = ITF entry
- PR = Protected ranking
- SR = Special ranking
- SE = Special exempt
- JE = Junior exempt
- JR = Junior Accelerator Programme entrant
- CO = College Accelerator Programme entrant
- NG = Next Gen Accelerator Program entrant
- w/o = Walkover
- r = Retired
- d = Defaulted

=== Finals ===
Semifinals
1	(Canada) Gabriela Dabrowski (Croatia) Mate Pavić	6	6
(Slovenia) Katarina Srebotnik (Mexico) Santiago González	4	4
8	(Germany) Anna-Lena Grönefeld (Colombia) Robert Farah	6	5	[8]
2	(Chinese Taipei) Latisha Chan (Croatia) Ivan Dodig	4	7	[10]

Final
1	(Canada) Gabriela Dabrowski (Croatia) Mate Pavić	1	7^{7}	[8]
2	(Chinese Taipei) Latisha Chan (Croatia) Ivan Dodig	6	6^{5}	[10]

=== Top half ===
First round
1	(Canada) G Dabrowski (Croatia) M Pavić	4	6	[10]
WC	(France) P Parmentier (France) G Barrère	6	3	[7]
(Czech Republic) A Sestini Hlaváčková (France) É Roger-Vasselin	6	6
WC	(France) C Paquet (France) B Paire	4	3
WC	(France) K Mladenovic (France) A Musialek	6	6
PR	(Spain) A Medina Garrigues (Spain) M Granollers	2	2
(Netherlands) D Schuurs (Netherlands) M Middelkoop	6	6
6	(Chinese Taipei) H-c Chan (New Zealand) M Venus	3	2
4	(Czech Republic) K Siniaková (United Kingdom) J Murray	2	6	[5]
(Spain) MJ Martínez Sánchez (Brazil) M Demoliner	6	4	[10]
(United Kingdom) J Konta (United Kingdom) D Inglot	6	6
WC	(France) F Ferro (France) E Furness	4	3
(Slovenia) K Srebotnik (Mexico) S González	2	6	[10]
Alt	(Japan) S Aoyama (India) D Sharan	6	3	[5]
(Latvia) J Ostapenko (Belarus) M Mirnyi	1	1
5	(Slovenia) A Klepač (Netherlands) J-J Rojer	6	6

Second round
1	(Canada) G Dabrowski (Croatia) M Pavić	6	6
(Czech Republic) A Sestini Hlaváčková (France) É Roger-Vasselin	2	3
WC	(France) K Mladenovic (France) A Musialek	4	5
(Netherlands) D Schuurs (Netherlands) M Middelkoop	6	7
(Spain) MJ Martínez Sánchez (Brazil) M Demoliner	w/o
(United Kingdom) J Konta (United Kingdom) D Inglot
(Slovenia) K Srebotnik (Mexico) S González	6	7^{7}
5	(Slovenia) A Klepač (Netherlands) J-J Rojer	2	6^{3}

Quarterfinals
1	(Canada) G Dabrowski (Croatia) M Pavić	6	6
(Netherlands) D Schuurs (Netherlands) M Middelkoop	4	4
(Spain) MJ Martínez Sánchez (Brazil) M Demoliner	6^{3}	6	[7]
(Slovenia) K Srebotnik (Mexico) S González	7^{7}	2	[10]

Semifinals
1	(Canada) G Dabrowski (Croatia) M Pavić	6	6
(Slovenia) K Srebotnik (Mexico) S González	4	4

=== Bottom half ===
First round
8	(Germany) A-L Grönefeld (Colombia) R Farah	6	5	[10]
(United States) C Vandeweghe (United States) R Ram	2	7	[4]
(Russia) A Kudryavtseva (Croatia) N Mektić	7^{7}	3	[10]
(China) Z Yang (Pakistan) A-u-H Qureshi	6^{2}	6	[8]
(United States) A Spears (Colombia) JS Cabal	5	6	[11]
(Czech Republic) K Peschke (Poland) M Matkowski	7	4	[9]
(Romania) M Buzărnescu (Finland) H Kontinen	7^{7}	3	[9]
3	(China) Y Xu (Austria) O Marach	6^{3}	6	[11]
7	(Hungary) T Babos (India) R Bopanna	2	3
(China) S Zhang (Australia) J Peers	6	6
WC	(France) T Andrianjafitrimo (France) U Humbert	2	6	[10]
(United States) N Melichar (Austria) A Peya	6	3	[12]
WC	(France) S Cakarevic (France) A Müller	4	2
PR	(United States) V King (Croatia) F Škugor	6	6
(Japan) M Ninomiya (Japan) B McLachlan	5	3
2	(Chinese Taipei) L Chan (Croatia) I Dodig	7	6

Second round
8	(Germany) A-L Grönefeld (Colombia) R Farah	6	6
(Russia) A Kudryavtseva (Croatia) N Mektić	0	1
(United States) A Spears (Colombia) JS Cabal	3	7^{7}	[10]
3	(China) Y Xu (Austria) O Marach	6	6^{3}	[6]
(China) S Zhang (Australia) J Peers	4	6	[7]
(United States) N Melichar (Austria) A Peya	6	3	[10]
PR	(United States) V King (Croatia) F Škugor	3	6	[7]
2	(Chinese Taipei) L Chan (Croatia) I Dodig	6	3	[10]

Quarterfinals
8	(Germany) A-L Grönefeld (Colombia) R Farah	7^{7}	6
(United States) A Spears (Colombia) JS Cabal	6^{3}	4
(United States) N Melichar (Austria) A Peya	6	4	[7]
2	(Chinese Taipei) L Chan (Croatia) I Dodig	2	6	[10]

Semifinals
8	(Germany) A-L Grönefeld (Colombia) R Farah	6	5	[8]
2	(Chinese Taipei) L Chan (Croatia) I Dodig	4	7	[10]
