= 2018 French Open – Legends under 45 doubles =

Legends under 45 doubles
- 2018 French Open

Final
- Champions: (Spain) Àlex Corretja (Spain) Juan Carlos Ferrero
- Runners-up: (Russia) Yevgeny Kafelnikov (Russia) Marat Safin
- Score: 6–3, 6–3

Events
Singles	men	women		boys	girls
Doubles	men	women	mixed	boys	girls
WC Singles	men	women	quad
WC Doubles	men	women	quad
Legends	−45	45+	women
- French Open

Sébastien Grosjean and Michaël Llodra were the defending champions, but were eliminated in the round robin competition.

Àlex Corretja and Juan Carlos Ferrero won the title, defeating Yevgeny Kafelnikov and Marat Safin in the final, 6–3, 6–3.

== Draw ==
Key

- Q = Qualifier
- WC = Wild card
- LL = Lucky loser
- Alt = Alternate
- ITF = ITF entry
- PR = Protected ranking
- SR = Special ranking
- SE = Special exempt
- JE = Junior exempt
- JR = Junior Accelerator Programme entrant
- CO = College Accelerator Programme entrant
- NG = Next Gen Accelerator Program entrant
- w/o = Walkover
- r = Retired
- d = Defaulted

=== Final ===
Finals
A2	(Russia) Yevgeny Kafelnikov (Russia) Marat Safin	3	3
B2	(Spain) Àlex Corretja (Spain) Juan Carlos Ferrero	6	6

=== Group A ===
		(France) A Clément (France) N Escudé	(Russia) Y Kafelnikov (Russia) M Safin	(Sweden) T Enqvist (Ukraine) A Medvedev	RR; W–L	Set; W–L	Game; W–L	Standings
A1	(France) Arnaud Clément (France) Nicolas Escudé		4–6, 3–6	6–3, 7–6^{(7–5)}	1–1	2–2	20–21	2
A2	(Russia) Yevgeny Kafelnikov (Russia) Marat Safin	6–4, 6–3		6–3, 3–6, [14–12]	2–0	4–1	22–16	1
A3	(Sweden) Thomas Enqvist (Ukraine) Andriy Medvedev	3–6, 6–7^{(5–7)}	3–6, 6–3, [12–14]		0–2	1–4	18–23	3

Standings are determined by: 1. number of wins; 2. number of matches; 3. in three-players-ties, percentage of sets won, or of games won; 4. steering-committee decision.

=== Group B ===
		(France) S Grosjean (France) M Llodra	(Spain) À Corretja (Spain) JC Ferrero	(United States) J Blake (Australia) M Philippoussis	RR; W–L	Set; W–L	Game; W–L	Standings
B1	(France) Sébastien Grosjean (France) Michaël Llodra		4–6, 2–6	6–2, 6–2	1–1	2–2	18–16	2
B2	(Spain) Àlex Corretja (Spain) Juan Carlos Ferrero	6–4, 6–2		7–5, 3–6, [10–8]	2–0	4–1	23–17	1
B3	(United States) James Blake (Australia) Mark Philippoussis	2–6, 2–6	5–7, 6–3, [8–10]		0–2	1–4	15–23	3

Standings are determined by: 1. number of wins; 2. number of matches; 3. in three-players-ties, percentage of sets won, or of games won; 4. steering-committee decision.
