= 2018 French Open – Men's doubles =

Men's doubles
- 2018 French Open

Final
- Champions: (France) Pierre-Hugues Herbert (France) Nicolas Mahut
- Runners-up: (Austria) Oliver Marach (Croatia) Mate Pavić
- Score: 6–2, 7–6^{(7–4)}

Details
- Draw: 64
- Seeds: 16

Events
Singles	men	women		boys	girls
Doubles	men	women	mixed	boys	girls
WC Singles	men	women	quad
WC Doubles	men	women	quad
Legends	−45	45+	women
← 2017 ·	French Open	· 2019 →

Pierre-Hugues Herbert and Nicolas Mahut won the men's doubles tennis title at the 2018 French Open, defeating Oliver Marach and Mate Pavić in the final, 6–2, 7–6^{(7–4)}. Herbert and Mahut were the third all-French team to reach the French Open men's doubles final in six years.

Ryan Harrison and Michael Venus were the defending champions, but they chose not to compete together this year. Harrison played alongside Vasek Pospisil, but lost in the first round to Federico Delbonis and Benoît Paire. Venus teamed up with Raven Klaasen, but lost in the third round to Nikola Mektić and Alexander Peya.

Pavić retained the ATP no. 1 doubles ranking when fellow contenders John Peers, Łukasz Kubot and Mike Bryan all lost before the semifinals.

Bob Bryan withdrew from the tournament with a right hip injury, ending a streak of 76 consecutive Grand Slam events played alongside his brother Mike as a team. 2017 US Open title holder, Horia Tecău, missed his first Grand Slam in 10 years with injury.

== Seeds ==
1. (Poland) Łukasz Kubot / (Brazil) Marcelo Melo (third round)
2. (Austria) Oliver Marach / (Croatia) Mate Pavić (final)
3. (Finland) Henri Kontinen / (Australia) John Peers (quarterfinals)
4. (United Kingdom) Jamie Murray / (Brazil) Bruno Soares (second round)
5. (Colombia) Juan Sebastián Cabal / (Colombia) Robert Farah (quarterfinals)
6. (France) Pierre-Hugues Herbert / (France) Nicolas Mahut (champions)
7. (Pakistan) Aisam-ul-Haq Qureshi / (Netherlands) Jean-Julien Rojer (first round)
8. (Croatia) Nikola Mektić / (Austria) Alexander Peya (semifinals)

9. (Croatia) Ivan Dodig / (United States) Rajeev Ram (second round)
10. (South Africa) Raven Klaasen / (New Zealand) Michael Venus (third round)
11. (Uruguay) Pablo Cuevas / (Spain) Marcel Granollers (second round)
12. (Spain) Feliciano López / (Spain) Marc López (semifinals)
13. (India) Rohan Bopanna / (France) Édouard Roger-Vasselin (quarterfinals)
14. (Japan) Ben McLachlan / (Germany) Jan-Lennard Struff (first round)
15. (Chile) Julio Peralta / (Argentina) Horacio Zeballos (second round)
16. (United States) Mike Bryan / (United States) Sam Querrey (first round)

== Draw ==
=== Key ===
- Q = Qualifier
- WC = Wild card
- LL = Lucky loser
- Alt = Alternate
- SE = Special exempt
- PR = Protected ranking
- ITF = ITF entry
- JE = Junior exempt
- w/o = Walkover
- r = Retired
- d = Defaulted
- SR = Special ranking

=== Finals ===
Quarterfinals
13	(India) Rohan Bopanna (France) Édouard Roger-Vasselin	6^{4}	2
8	(Croatia) Nikola Mektić (Austria) Alexander Peya	7^{7}	6
(Argentina) Máximo González (Chile) Nicolás Jarry	4	6^{8}
6	(France) Pierre-Hugues Herbert (France) Nicolas Mahut	6	7^{10}
12	(Spain) Feliciano López (Spain) Marc López	6	6^{2}	7^{7}
3	(Finland) Henri Kontinen (Australia) John Peers	4	7^{7}	6^{3}
5	(Colombia) Juan Sebastián Cabal (Colombia) Robert Farah	6	4	3
2	(Austria) Oliver Marach (Croatia) Mate Pavić	3	6	6

Semifinals
8	(Croatia) Nikola Mektić (Austria) Alexander Peya	3	4
6	(France) Pierre-Hugues Herbert (France) Nicolas Mahut	6	6
12	(Spain) Feliciano López (Spain) Marc López	4	5
2	(Austria) Oliver Marach (Croatia) Mate Pavić	6	7

Final
6	(France) Pierre-Hugues Herbert (France) Nicolas Mahut	6	7^{7}
2	(Austria) Oliver Marach (Croatia) Mate Pavić	2	6^{4}

=== Top half ===
==== Section 1 ====
First round
1	(Poland) Ł Kubot (Brazil) M Melo	6	7
(Italy) M Cecchinato (Hungary) M Fucsovics	4	5
(Spain) R Carballés Baena (Spain) G García López	4	6	6
(Italy) S Bolelli (Italy) F Fognini	6	3	4
(United States) S Lipsky (United States) T Sandgren	2	4
WC	(France) B Bonzi (France) G Jacq	6	6
(United States) T Fritz (United States) F Tiafoe	3	1
13	(India) R Bopanna (France) É Roger-Vasselin	6	6
10	(South Africa) R Klaasen (New Zealand) M Venus	6	6
WC	(France) C Denolly (France) A Müller	3	3
(Spain) D Marrero (Spain) F Verdasco	3	5
(France) J Eysseric (France) H Nys	6	7
(Georgia (country)) N Basilashvili (Australia) J Millman	6	3	7
WC	(France) F Lakat (France) A Rinderknech	3	6	5
(United Kingdom) D Inglot (Croatia) F Škugor	4	3
8	(Croatia) N Mektić (Austria) A Peya	6	6

Second round
1	(Poland) Ł Kubot (Brazil) M Melo	6	7
(Spain) R Carballés Baena (Spain) G García López	4	5
WC	(France) B Bonzi (France) G Jacq	1	2
13	(India) R Bopanna (France) É Roger-Vasselin	6	6
10	(South Africa) R Klaasen (New Zealand) M Venus	7^{7}	6
(France) J Eysseric (France) H Nys	6^{2}	3
(Georgia (country)) N Basilashvili (Australia) J Millman	4	2
8	(Croatia) N Mektić (Austria) A Peya	6	6

Third round
1	(Poland) Ł Kubot (Brazil) M Melo	4	6^{1}
13	(India) R Bopanna (France) É Roger-Vasselin	6	7^{7}
10	(South Africa) R Klaasen (New Zealand) M Venus	6^{2}	6^{4}
8	(Croatia) N Mektić (Austria) A Peya	7^{7}	7^{7}

Quarterfinals
13	(India) R Bopanna (France) É Roger-Vasselin	6^{4}	2
8	(Croatia) N Mektić (Austria) A Peya	7^{7}	6

==== Section 2 ====
First round
4	(United Kingdom) J Murray (Brazil) B Soares	6	7
(Serbia) D Lajović (Germany) F Mayer	1	5
(Argentina) M González (Chile) N Jarry	6	6
(Italy) P Lorenzi (Germany) M Zverev	1	2
Alt	(France) C Hemery (France) S Robert	6	4	7^{8}
(Australia) M Ebden (United States) D Young	2	6	6^{6}
WC	(France) H Gaston (France) C Tabur	2	2
15	(Chile) J Peralta (Argentina) H Zeballos	6	6
11	(Uruguay) P Cuevas (Spain) M Granollers	7	6
WC	(France) J Chardy (Canada) D Nestor	5	2
(United States) S Johnson (United States) J Sock	7^{8}	6
(United States) N Monroe (Australia) J-P Smith	6^{6}	4
(Netherlands) R Haase (Netherlands) M Middelkoop	6	6
PR	(Japan) Y Nishioka (Japan) Y Sugita	1	2
(Sweden) R Lindstedt (Poland) M Matkowski	4	6	6^{6}
6	(France) P-H Herbert (France) N Mahut	6	3	7^{8}

Second round
4	(United Kingdom) J Murray (Brazil) B Soares	4	7	4
(Argentina) M González (Chile) N Jarry	6	5	6
Alt	(France) C Hemery (France) S Robert	2	7	6
15	(Chile) J Peralta (Argentina) H Zeballos	6	5	4
11	(Uruguay) P Cuevas (Spain) M Granollers	5	4
(United States) S Johnson (United States) J Sock	7	6
(Netherlands) R Haase (Netherlands) M Middelkoop	5	6^{6}
6	(France) P-H Herbert (France) N Mahut	7	7^{8}

Third round
(Argentina) M González (Chile) N Jarry	7	6
Alt	(France) C Hemery (France) S Robert	5	3
(United States) S Johnson (United States) J Sock	4	3
6	(France) P-H Herbert (France) N Mahut	6	6

Quarterfinals
(Argentina) M González (Chile) N Jarry	4	6^{8}
6	(France) P-H Herbert (France) N Mahut	6	7^{10}

=== Bottom half ===
==== Section 3 ====
First round
7	(Pakistan) A-u-H Qureshi (Netherlands) J-J Rojer	7^{7}	6^{5}	4
Alt	(Russia) E Donskoy (Mexico) MÁ Reyes-Varela	6^{2}	7^{7}	6
WC	(France) G Blancaneaux (France) C Lestienne	6^{3}	3
(Argentina) L Mayer (Portugal) J Sousa	7^{7}	6
(Czech Republic) R Jebavý (Belarus) A Vasilevski	6^{5}	7^{10}	6^{2}
(Brazil) M Demoliner (Mexico) S González	7^{7}	6^{8}	7^{7}
(Argentina) G Durán (Argentina) A Molteni	3	4
12	(Spain) F López (Spain) M López	6	6
16	(United States) M Bryan (United States) S Querrey	5	4
(United Kingdom) K Skupski (United Kingdom) N Skupski	7	6
(Germany) M Marterer (Germany) P Petzschner	6	6^{6}	4
PR	(Italy) D Bracciali (Italy) A Seppi	2	7^{8}	6
(Bosnia and Herzegovina) M Bašić (Bosnia and Herzegovina) D Džumhur	6	6
(Spain) A Ramos Viñolas (Czech Republic) J Veselý	4	3
(Belarus) I Ivashka (Russia) K Khachanov	3	2
3	(Finland) H Kontinen (Australia) J Peers	6	6

Second round
Alt	(Russia) E Donskoy (Mexico) MÁ Reyes-Varela	2	4
(Argentina) L Mayer (Portugal) J Sousa	6	6
(Brazil) M Demoliner (Mexico) S González	3	4
12	(Spain) F López (Spain) M López	6	6
(United Kingdom) K Skupski (United Kingdom) N Skupski	6	3	2
PR	(Italy) D Bracciali (Italy) A Seppi	3	6	6
(Bosnia and Herzegovina) M Bašić (Bosnia and Herzegovina) D Džumhur	1	2
3	(Finland) H Kontinen (Australia) J Peers	6	6

Third round
(Argentina) L Mayer (Portugal) J Sousa	3	3
12	(Spain) F López (Spain) M López	6	6
PR	(Italy) D Bracciali (Italy) A Seppi	6^{2}	4
3	(Finland) H Kontinen (Australia) J Peers	7^{7}	6

Quarterfinals
12	(Spain) F López (Spain) M López	6	6^{2}	7^{7}
3	(Finland) H Kontinen (Australia) J Peers	4	7^{7}	6^{3}

==== Section 4 ====
First round
5	(Colombia) JS Cabal (Colombia) R Farah	7^{7}	7^{7}
(Belarus) M Mirnyi (Austria) P Oswald	6^{3}	6^{4}
(Argentina) G Pella (Argentina) D Schwartzman	6	6
WC	(France) A Hoang (France) U Humbert	3	3
(Germany) A Begemann (Croatia) A Šančić	7^{7}	2	4
(Netherlands) W Koolhof (New Zealand) A Sitak	6^{4}	6	6
(Chile) H Podlipnik-Castillo (United States) J Withrow	6	4	1
9	(Croatia) I Dodig (United States) R Ram	4	6	6
14	(Japan) B McLachlan (Germany) J-L Struff	7^{7}	6^{3}	3
(El Salvador) M Arévalo (United States) J Cerretani	6^{4}	7^{7}	6
(Argentina) F Delbonis (France) B Paire	6	6
(United States) R Harrison (Canada) V Pospisil	4	3
(France) F Martin (India) P Raja	3	7	4
(India) Y Bhambri (India) D Sharan	6	5	6
(Netherlands) S Arends (Canada) A Shamasdin	2	2
2	(Austria) O Marach (Croatia) M Pavić	6	6

Second round
5	(Colombia) JS Cabal (Colombia) R Farah	6	7^{7}
(Argentina) G Pella (Argentina) D Schwartzman	4	6^{4}
(Netherlands) W Koolhof (New Zealand) A Sitak	5	7	6
9	(Croatia) I Dodig (United States) R Ram	7	5	4
(El Salvador) M Arévalo (United States) J Cerretani	7^{7}	6
(Argentina) F Delbonis (France) B Paire	6^{5}	4
(India) Y Bhambri (India) D Sharan	5	3
2	(Austria) O Marach (Croatia) M Pavić	7	6

Third round
5	(Colombia) JS Cabal (Colombia) R Farah	3	6	6
(Netherlands) W Koolhof (New Zealand) A Sitak	6	4	3
(El Salvador) M Arévalo (United States) J Cerretani	3	6	3
2	(Austria) O Marach (Croatia) M Pavić	6	3	6

Quarterfinals
5	(Colombia) JS Cabal (Colombia) R Farah	6	4	3
2	(Austria) O Marach (Croatia) M Pavić	3	6	6
