= 2015 L'Open Emeraude Solaire de Saint-Malo – Singles =

Singles
- 2015 L'Open Emeraude Solaire de Saint-Malo

Final
- Champion: (Russia) Daria Kasatkina
- Runner-up: (Germany) Laura Siegemund
- Score: 7–5, 7–6^{(7–4)}

Events
Singles	Doubles
← 2014 ·	L'Open Emeraude Solaire de Saint-Malo	· 2016 →

Carina Witthöft was the defending champion, but chose not to participate.

Daria Kasatkina won the title, defeating Laura Siegemund in the final, 7–5, 7–6^{(7–4)}.

== Seeds ==
1. (Brazil) Teliana Pereira (quarterfinals)
2. (Estonia) Kaia Kanepi (quarterfinals)
3. (Spain) Lourdes Domínguez Lino (semifinals)
4. (Netherlands) Richèl Hogenkamp (first round; retired)
5. (Germany) Laura Siegemund (final)
6. (Russia) Daria Kasatkina (champion)
7. (France) Pauline Parmentier (first round)
8. (Ukraine) Maryna Zanevska (withdrew)

== Main draw ==
=== Key ===
- Q = Qualifier
- WC = Wild card
- LL = Lucky loser
- Alt = Alternate
- SE = Special exempt
- PR = Protected ranking
- ITF = ITF entry
- JE = Junior exempt
- w/o = Walkover
- r = Retired
- d = Defaulted
- SR = Special ranking

=== Finals ===
Semifinals
5	(Germany) Laura Siegemund	6	6
(Liechtenstein) Stephanie Vogt	2	2
3	(Spain) Lourdes Domínguez Lino	3	4
6/JE	(Russia) Daria Kasatkina	6	6

Final
5	(Germany) Laura Siegemund	5	6^{4}
6/JE	(Russia) Daria Kasatkina	7	7^{7}

=== Top half ===
First round
1	(Brazil) T Pereira	7	6
(France) C Paquet	5	2
(Netherlands) C Burger	6^{2}	6	6
WC	(France) L Sarrazin	7^{7}	1	3
Q	(Germany) T Korpatsch	3	3
PR	(France) A Rezaï	6	6
(Russia) M Melnikova	3	0
5	(Germany) L Siegemund	6	6
4	(Netherlands) R Hogenkamp	4	0^{r}
(Liechtenstein) S Vogt	6	1
(France) V Razzano	3	6	3
(Italy) A Brianti	6	4	6
(Czech Republic) P Cetkovská	6	6
WC	(France) T Gravouil	2	4
(Spain) L Pous Tió	6	1	6
LL	(Spain) G García Pérez	0	6	3

Second round
1	(Brazil) T Pereira	6	6
(Netherlands) C Burger	3	2
PR	(France) A Rezaï	2	0
5	(Germany) L Siegemund	6	6
(Liechtenstein) S Vogt	6	6
(Italy) A Brianti	3	4
(Czech Republic) P Cetkovská	3	0^{r}
(Spain) L Pous Tió	6	0

Quarterfinals
1	(Brazil) T Pereira	6^{4}	4
5	(Germany) L Siegemund	7^{7}	6
(Liechtenstein) S Vogt	1	6	6
(Spain) L Pous Tió	6	4	2

Semifinals
5	(Germany) L Siegemund	6	6
(Liechtenstein) S Vogt	2	2

=== Bottom half ===
First round
7	(France) P Parmentier	5	7	3
(France) M Georges	7	5	6
WC	(France) J Suvrijn	4	3
(Latvia) A Sevastova	6	6
(France) S Foretz	7^{9}	4	5
Q	(Russia) N Vikhlyantseva	6^{7}	6	7
WC	(Mauritius) E de Beer	1	3
3	(Spain) L Domínguez Lino	6	6
6/JE	(Russia) D Kasatkina	6	6
(Slovenia) N Kolar	2	4
Q	(Spain) O Sáez Larra	6	6^{2}	2
Q	(Russia) I Khromacheva	3	7^{7}	6
(Hungary) R-L Jani	6	7^{7}
(Slovakia) K Kučová	1	6^{5}
(Netherlands) L Kerkhove	2	2
2	(Estonia) K Kanepi	6	6

Second round
(France) M Georges	2	6	2
(Latvia) A Sevastova	6	3	6
Q	(Russia) N Vikhlyantseva	3	4
3	(Spain) L Domínguez Lino	6	6
6/JE	(Russia) D Kasatkina	6	6
Q	(Russia) I Khromacheva	2	4
(Hungary) R-L Jani	6	3	0
2	(Estonia) K Kanepi	3	6	6

Quarterfinals
(Latvia) A Sevastova	3	6	3
3	(Spain) L Domínguez Lino	6	2	6
6/JE	(Russia) D Kasatkina	2	6	6
2	(Estonia) K Kanepi	6	1	1

Semifinals
3	(Spain) L Domínguez Lino	3	4
6/JE	(Russia) D Kasatkina	6	6
