= 2015 L'Open Emeraude Solaire de Saint-Malo =

- Date: 14–20 September
- Edition: 20th
- Category: ITF Women's Circuit
- Prize money: $50,000+H
- Surface: Clay
- Location: Saint-Malo, France

Champions

Singles
- (Russia) Daria Kasatkina

Doubles
- (Slovakia) Kristína Kučová / (Latvia) Anastasija Sevastova
← 2014 ·	L'Open Emeraude Solaire de Saint-Malo	· 2016 →

The 2015 L'Open Emeraude Solaire de Saint-Malo was a professional tennis tournament played on outdoor clay courts. It was the twentieth edition of the tournament and part of the 2015 ITF Women's Circuit, offering a total of $50,000+H in prize money. It took place in Saint-Malo, France, on 14–20 September 2015.

== Singles main draw entrants ==
=== Seeds ===
Country	Player	Rank^{1}	Seed
BRA	Teliana Pereira	54	1
EST	Kaia Kanepi	89	2
ESP	Lourdes Domínguez Lino	105	3
NED	Richèl Hogenkamp	122	4
GER	Laura Siegemund	126	5
RUS	Daria Kasatkina	133	6
FRA	Pauline Parmentier	140	7
UKR	Maryna Zanevska	141	8

- ^{1} Rankings as of 31 August 2015

=== Other entrants ===
The following players received wildcards into the singles main draw:

- (Mauritius) Emmanuelle de Beer
- (France) Théo Gravouil
- (France) Laëtitia Sarrazin
- (France) Jade Suvrijn

The following players received entry from the qualifying draw:

- (Russia) Irina Khromacheva
- (Germany) Tamara Korpatsch
- (Spain) Olga Sáez Larra
- (Russia) Natalia Vikhlyantseva

The following player received entry by a lucky loser spot:

- (Spain) Georgina García Pérez

The following player received entry by a protected ranking:

- (France) Aravane Rezaï

The following player received entry by a junior exempt:

- (Russia) Daria Kasatkina

== Champions ==
=== Singles ===
- (Russia) Daria Kasatkina def. (Germany) Laura Siegemund, 7–5, 7–6^{(7–4)}

=== Doubles ===
- (Slovakia) Kristína Kučová / (Latvia) Anastasija Sevastova def. (Russia) Maria Marfutina / (Russia) Natalia Vikhlyantseva, 6–7^{(1–7)}, 6–3, [10–5]
