= 2014 L'Open Emeraude Solaire de Saint-Malo =

- Date: 8–14 September
- Edition: 19th
- Category: ITF Women's Circuit
- Prize money: $50,000
- Surface: Clay
- Location: Saint-Malo, France

Champions

Singles
- (Germany) Carina Witthöft

Doubles
- (Italy) Giulia Gatto-Monticone / (Italy) Anastasia Grymalska
- L'Open Emeraude Solaire de Saint-Malo

The 2014 L'Open Emeraude Solaire de Saint-Malo was a professional tennis tournament played on outdoor clay courts. It was the nineteenth edition of the tournament which was part of the 2014 ITF Women's Circuit, offering a total of $50,000 in prize money. It took place in Saint-Malo, France, on 8–14 September 2014.

== Singles main draw entrants ==
=== Seeds ===
Country	Player	Rank^{1}	Seed
BRA	Teliana Pereira	91	1
ESP	Lourdes Domínguez Lino	126	2
UKR	Anastasiya Vasylyeva	154	3
NED	Richèl Hogenkamp	165	4
GER	Carina Witthöft	169	5
ROU	Alexandra Cadanțu	174	6
LIE	Stephanie Vogt	188	7
FRA	Amandine Hesse	190	8

- ^{1} Rankings as of 25 August 2014

=== Other entrants ===
The following players received wildcards into the singles main draw:

- (France) Fanny Caramaro
- (France) Jessika Ponchet
- (France) Jade Suvrijn

The following players received entry from the qualifying draw:

- (Belgium) Catherine Chantraine
- (Italy) Jasmine Paolini
- (Spain) Laura Pous Tió
- (Spain) Sara Sorribes Tormo

The following players received entry by a lucky loser spot:

- (France) Chloé Paquet

The following player received entry by a protected ranking:

- (Croatia) Ana Savić

== Champions ==
=== Singles ===
- (Germany) Carina Witthöft def. (Italy) Alberta Brianti, 6–0, 6–1

=== Doubles ===
- (Italy) Giulia Gatto-Monticone / (Italy) Anastasia Grymalska def. (Argentina) Tatiana Búa / (Spain) Beatriz García Vidagany, 6–3, 6–1
