= 2015 L'Open Emeraude Solaire de Saint-Malo – Doubles =

Doubles
- 2015 L'Open Emeraude Solaire de Saint-Malo

Final
- Champions: (Slovakia) Kristína Kučová (Latvia) Anastasija Sevastova
- Runners-up: (Russia) Maria Marfutina (Russia) Natalia Vikhlyantseva
- Score: 6–7^{(1–7)}, 6–3, [10–5]

Events
Singles	Doubles
← 2014 ·	L'Open Emeraude Solaire de Saint-Malo	· 2016 →

Giulia Gatto-Monticone and Anastasia Grymalska were the defending champions, but they chose not to participate.

Kristína Kučová and Anastasija Sevastova won the title, defeating Maria Marfutina and Natalia Vikhlyantseva in the final, 6–7^{(1–7)}, 6–3, [10–5].

== Seeds ==
1. (Hungary) Réka-Luca Jani / (Liechtenstein) Stephanie Vogt (semifinals)
2. (Slovenia) Nastja Kolar / (Sweden) Cornelia Lister (semifinals)
3. (Netherlands) Richèl Hogenkamp / (Netherlands) Lesley Kerkhove (quarterfinals; withdrew)
4. (Argentina) Tatiana Búa / (Spain) Georgina García Pérez (quarterfinals)

== Draw ==
=== Key ===
- Q = Qualifier
- WC = Wild card
- LL = Lucky loser
- Alt = Alternate
- SE = Special exempt
- PR = Protected ranking
- ITF = ITF entry
- JE = Junior exempt
- w/o = Walkover
- r = Retired
- d = Defaulted
- SR = Special ranking

First round
(Netherlands) C Ewijk (Netherlands) R van der Hoek	7^{7}	6
(France) M Georges (France) H Tan	6^{4}	3
(France) L Sarrazin (France) J Suvrijn
(Slovakia) K Kučová (Latvia) A Sevastova	w/o
(Belgium) C Chantraine (Mauritius) E de Beer	2	2
(Russia) M Marfutina (Russia) N Vikhlyantseva	6	6
(Spain) L Pous Tió (Ukraine) V Strakhova	w/o
(Italy) N Burnett (Italy) S Rubini

Quarterfinals
1	(Hungary) R-L Jani (Liechtenstein) S Vogt	6	6
(Netherlands) C Ewijk (Netherlands) R van der Hoek	4	1
4	(Argentina) T Búa (Spain) G García Pérez	4	4
(Slovakia) K Kučová (Latvia) A Sevastova	6	6
(Russia) M Marfutina (Russia) N Vikhlyantseva	w/o
3	(Netherlands) R Hogenkamp (Netherlands) L Kerkhove
(Spain) L Pous Tió (Ukraine) V Strakhova	3	1
2	(Slovenia) N Kolar (Sweden) C Lister	6	6

Semifinals
1	(Hungary) R-L Jani (Liechtenstein) S Vogt	7^{8}	2	[9]
(Slovakia) K Kučová (Latvia) A Sevastova	6^{6}	6	[11]
(Russia) M Marfutina (Russia) N Vikhlyantseva	6	3	[10]
2	(Slovenia) N Kolar (Sweden) C Lister	4	6	[5]

Final
(Slovakia) K Kučová (Latvia) A Sevastova	6^{1}	6	[10]
(Russia) M Marfutina (Russia) N Vikhlyantseva	7^{7}	3	[5]
