= 2014 L'Open Emeraude Solaire de Saint-Malo – Singles =

Singles
- 2014 L'Open Emeraude Solaire de Saint-Malo

Final
- Champion: (Germany) Carina Witthöft
- Runner-up: (Italy) Alberta Brianti
- Score: 6–0, 6–1

Events
Singles	Doubles
← 2013 ·	L'Open Emeraude Solaire de Saint-Malo	· 2015 →

Teliana Pereira was the defending champion, having won the previous event in 2013, but retired in the semifinals against Alberta Brianti.

Carina Witthöft won the title, defeating Brianti in the final, 6–0, 6–1.

== Seeds ==
1. (Brazil) Teliana Pereira (semifinals, retired)
2. (Spain) Lourdes Domínguez Lino (quarterfinals)
3. (Ukraine) Anastasiya Vasylyeva (second round)
4. (Netherlands) Richèl Hogenkamp (second round)
5. (Germany) Carina Witthöft (champion)
6. (Romania) Alexandra Cadanțu (quarterfinals)
7. (Liechtenstein) Stephanie Vogt (quarterfinals)
8. (France) Amandine Hesse (first round)

== Main draw ==
=== Key ===
- Q = Qualifier
- WC = Wild card
- LL = Lucky loser
- Alt = Alternate
- SE = Special exempt
- PR = Protected ranking
- ITF = ITF entry
- JE = Junior exempt
- w/o = Walkover
- r = Retired
- d = Defaulted
- SR = Special ranking

=== Finals ===
Semifinals
1	(Brazil) Teliana Pereira	3^{r}
(Italy) Alberta Brianti	6
Q	(Spain) Sara Sorribes Tormo	2	2
5	(Germany) Carina Witthöft	6	6

Final
(Italy) Alberta Brianti	0	1
5	(Germany) Carina Witthöft	6	6

=== Top half ===
First round
1	(Brazil) T Pereira	6	6
(Sweden) S Celik	2	4
(Switzerland) L Michel	7	5
(Russia) I Khromacheva	5	3^{r}
(Italy) G Gatto-Monticone	6	6^{5}	7
(Italy) A Grymalska	3	7^{7}	5
(Spain) B García Vidagany	4	6	5
7	(Liechtenstein) S Vogt	6	3	7
3	(Ukraine) A Vasylyeva	6	4	6
PR	(Croatia) A Savić	1	6	3
(Germany) N Zander	2	1
(Italy) A Brianti	6	6
WC	(France) F Caramaro	2	0
(France) I Ramialison	6	6
Q	(Italy) J Paolini	2	6	4
6	(Romania) A Cadanțu	6	3	6

Second round
1	(Brazil) T Pereira	6	6
(Switzerland) L Michel	4	1
(Italy) G Gatto-Monticone	1	6	1
7	(Liechtenstein) S Vogt	6	4	6
3	(Ukraine) A Vasylyeva	2	3
(Italy) A Brianti	6	6
(France) I Ramialison	6	3	2
6	(Romania) A Cadanțu	4	6	6

Quarterfinals
1	(Brazil) T Pereira	6	6
7	(Liechtenstein) S Vogt	1	1
(Italy) A Brianti	6	5	6
6	(Romania) A Cadanțu	2	7	4

Semifinals
1	(Brazil) T Pereira	3^{r}
(Italy) A Brianti	6

=== Bottom half ===
First round
8	(France) A Hesse	3	5
Q	(Spain) S Sorribes Tormo	6	7
(Ukraine) G Poznikhirenko	6	5	6
(Argentina) C Pella	0	7	3
WC	(France) J Suvrijn	3	0
(Netherlands) L Kerkhove	6	6
Q	(Belgium) C Chantraine	2	2
4	(Netherlands) R Hogenkamp	6	6
5	(Germany) C Witthöft	6	6
(France) J Coin	3	1
WC	(France) J Ponchet	1	6^{9}
(Czech Republic) R Voráčová	6	7^{11}
Q	(Spain) L Pous Tió	4	6	7
LL	(France) C Paquet	6	0	5
(Italy) G Sanesi	2	4
2	(Spain) L Domínguez Lino	6	6

Second round
Q	(Spain) S Sorribes Tormo	6	6
(Ukraine) G Poznikhirenko	4	0
(Netherlands) L Kerkhove	2	6	7^{7}
4	(Netherlands) R Hogenkamp	6	2	6^{4}
5	(Germany) C Witthöft	6	6
(Czech Republic) R Voráčová	1	4
Q	(Spain) L Pous Tió	6	3	2
2	(Spain) L Domínguez Lino	4	6	6

Quarterfinals
Q	(Spain) S Sorribes Tormo	7	6
(Netherlands) L Kerkhove	5	3
5	(Germany) C Witthöft	6^{7}	6	6
2	(Spain) L Domínguez Lino	7^{9}	0	0

Semifinals
Q	(Spain) S Sorribes Tormo	2	2
5	(Germany) C Witthöft	6	6
