= 2014 L'Open Emeraude Solaire de Saint-Malo – Doubles =

Doubles
- 2014 L'Open Emeraude Solaire de Saint-Malo

Final
- Champions: (Italy) Giulia Gatto-Monticone (Italy) Anastasia Grymalska
- Runners-up: (Argentina) Tatiana Búa (Spain) Beatriz García Vidagany
- Score: 6–3, 6–1

Events
Singles	Doubles
← 2013 ·	L'Open Emeraude Solaire de Saint-Malo	· 2015 →

Elitsa Kostova and Florencia Molinero were the defending champions, having won the previous event in 2013, however both players chose not to participate.

Giulia Gatto-Monticone and Anastasia Grymalska won the title, defeating Tatiana Búa and Beatriz García Vidagany in the final, 6–3, 6–1.

== Seeds ==
1. (Argentina) Tatiana Búa / (Spain) Beatriz García Vidagany (final)
2. (Russia) Irina Khromacheva / (Ukraine) Ganna Poznikhirenko (quarterfinals, withdrew)
3. (Italy) Giulia Gatto-Monticone / (Italy) Anastasia Grymalska (champions)
4. (Netherlands) Richèl Hogenkamp / (Netherlands) Lesley Kerkhove (semifinals)

== Draw ==
=== Key ===
- Q = Qualifier
- WC = Wild card
- LL = Lucky loser
- Alt = Alternate
- SE = Special exempt
- PR = Protected ranking
- ITF = ITF entry
- JE = Junior exempt
- w/o = Walkover
- r = Retired
- d = Defaulted
- SR = Special ranking

First round
(France) F Caramaro (Spain) G García Pérez	3	3
(Germany) C Witthöft (Germany) N Zander	6	6
(France) L Jeanjean (France) A Van Cauter
(Belgium) C Chantraine (France) E Thébault	w/o
(France) M Arcangioli (France) C Paquet	3	6	[2]
(Russia) N Orlova (Croatia) A Savić	6	0	[10]

Quarterfinals
1	(Argentina) T Búa (Spain) B García Vidagany	w/o
(Germany) C Witthöft (Germany) N Zander
4	(Netherlands) R Hogenkamp (Netherlands) L Kerkhove	6	6
(Belgium) C Chantraine (France) E Thébault	2	2
(Russia) N Orlova (Croatia) A Savić	2	0
3	(Italy) G Gatto-Monticone (Italy) A Grymalska	6	6
(Italy) A Brianti (Ukraine) A Vasylyeva	w/o
2	(Russia) I Khromacheva (Ukraine) G Poznikhirenko

Semifinals
1	(Argentina) T Búa (Spain) B García Vidagany	6	6
4	(Netherlands) R Hogenkamp (Netherlands) L Kerkhove	4	0
3	(Italy) G Gatto-Monticone (Italy) A Grymalska	6^{3}	6	[11]
(Italy) A Brianti (Ukraine) A Vasylyeva	7^{7}	1	[9]

Final
1	(Argentina) T Búa (Spain) B García Vidagany	3	1
3	(Italy) G Gatto-Monticone (Italy) A Grymalska	6	6
