= 2018 French Open =

- Date: 27 May – 10 June 2018
- Edition: 117
- Category: Grand Slam
- Draw: 128S / 64D / 32X
- Prize money: €39,197,000
- Surface: Clay
- Location: Paris (XVI^{e}), France
- Venue: Roland Garros Stadium

Champions

Men's singles
- (Spain) Rafael Nadal

Women's singles
- (Romania) Simona Halep

Men's doubles
- (France) Pierre-Hugues Herbert / (France) Nicolas Mahut

Women's doubles
- (Czech Republic) Barbora Krejčíková / (Czech Republic) Kateřina Siniaková

Mixed doubles
- (Chinese Taipei) Latisha Chan / (Croatia) Ivan Dodig

Wheelchair men's singles
- (Japan) Shingo Kunieda

Wheelchair women's singles
- (Japan) Yui Kamiji

Wheelchair men's doubles
- (France) Stéphane Houdet / (France) Nicolas Peifer

Wheelchair women's doubles
- (Netherlands) Diede de Groot / (Netherlands) Aniek van Koot

Boys' singles
- (Chinese Taipei) Tseng Chun-hsin

Girls' singles
- (United States) Coco Gauff

Boys' doubles
- (Czech Republic) Ondřej Štyler / (Japan) Naoki Tajima

Girls' doubles
- (United States) Caty McNally / (Poland) Iga Świątek

Legends under 45 doubles
- (Spain) Àlex Corretja / (Spain) Juan Carlos Ferrero

Women's legends doubles
- (France) Nathalie Dechy / (France) Amélie Mauresmo

Legends over 45 doubles
- (France) Mansour Bahrami / (France) Fabrice Santoro
- French Open

The 2018 French Open was a major tennis tournament played on outdoor clay courts. It took place at the Stade Roland Garros in Paris, France, from 27 May to 10 June and consisted of events for players in singles, doubles and mixed doubles play. Junior and wheelchair players also took part in singles and doubles events. Rafael Nadal (Spain) was the defending champion in the Men's Singles and won his 11th French Open title. Simona Halep (Romania) won her first Grand Slam title in Women's Singles.

It was the 117th edition of the French Open and the second Grand Slam event of 2018. Jeļena Ostapenko was the defending champion in the Women's Singles but lost in the first round to Kateryna Kozlova. This was the first French Open since 1992 that both the men's and the women's singles competitions were won by the top seeds.

== Tournament ==
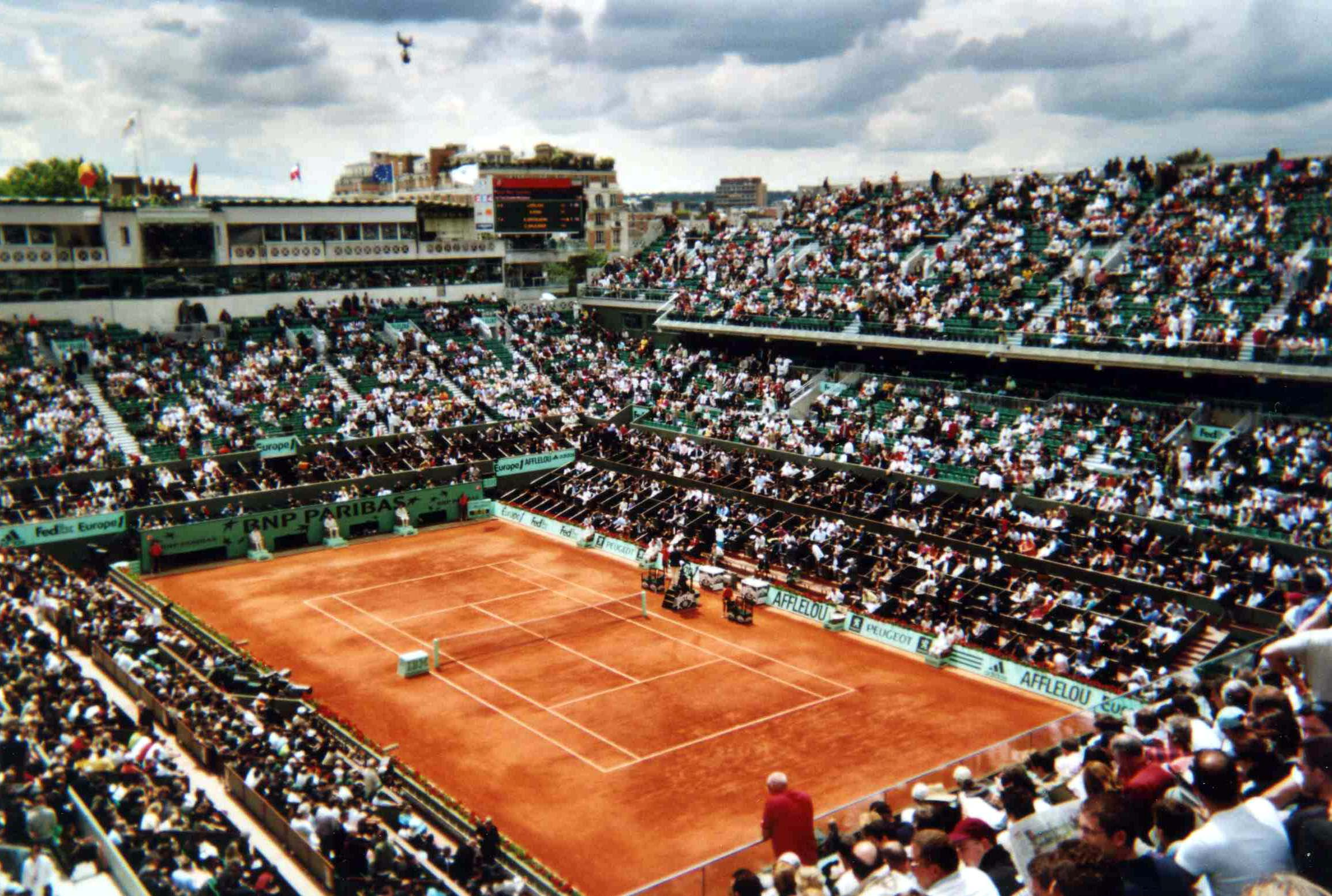
Court Philippe Chatrier where the Finals of the French Open will take place.

The 2018 French Open was the 117th edition of the French Open and was held at Stade Roland Garros in Paris. A new shot clock that gives 25 seconds for the player serving, between points was introduced. Also for the juniors tournament, service lets wasn't featured.

The tournament is an event run by the International Tennis Federation (ITF) and is part of the 2018 ATP World Tour and the 2018 WTA Tour calendars under the Grand Slam category. The tournament consisted of both men's and women's singles and doubles draws as well as a mixed doubles event.

There is a singles and doubles events for both boys and girls (players under 18), which is part of the Grade A category of tournaments, and singles and doubles events for men's and women's wheelchair tennis players under the Grand Slam category. The tournament was played on clay courts and took place over a series of 22 courts, including the three main showcourts, Court Philippe Chatrier, Court Suzanne Lenglen and Court 1.

== Points and prize money ==
=== Points distribution ===
Below is a series of tables for each of the competitions showing the ranking points on offer for each event.

==== Senior points ====
Event	W	F	SF	QF	Round of 16	Round of 32	Round of 64	Round of 128	Q	Q3	Q2	Q1
Men's singles	2000	1200	720	360	180	90	45	10	25	16	8	0
Men's doubles	2000	1200	720	360	180	90	0	—N/a	—N/a	—N/a	—N/a	—N/a
Women's singles	2000	1300	780	430	240	130	70	10	40	30	20	2
Women's doubles	2000	1300	780	430	240	130	10	—N/a	—N/a	—N/a	—N/a	—N/a

==== Wheelchair points ====
Event	W	F	SF/3rd	QF/4th
Singles	800	500	375	100
Doubles	800	500	100	—N/a
Quad singles	800	500	100	—N/a
Quad doubles	800	100	—N/a	—N/a

==== Junior points ====
Event	W	F	SF	QF	Round of 16	Round of 32	Q	Q3
Boys' singles	1000	600	370	200	100	45	30	20
Girls' singles	1000	600	370	200	100	45	30	20
Boys' doubles	750	450	275	150	75	—N/a	—N/a	—N/a
Girls' doubles	750	450	275	150	75	—N/a	—N/a	—N/a

=== Prize money ===
The total prize money for the 2018 edition is €39,197,000. The winners of the men's and women's singles title receive €2,200,000, an increase of €100,000 compared to 2017.

Event	W	F	SF	QF	Round of 16	Round of 32	Round of 64	Round of 128	Q3	Q2	Q1
Singles	€2,200,000	€1,120,000	€560,000	€380,000	€222,000	€130,000	€79,000	€40,000	€21,000	€11,000	€6,000
Doubles *	€560,000	€280,000	€139,000	€76,000	€41,000	€22,000	€11,000	—N/a	—N/a	—N/a	—N/a
Mixed doubles *	€120,000	€60,000	€30,000	€17,000	€9,500	€4,750	—N/a	—N/a	—N/a	—N/a	—N/a
Wheelchair singles	€35,000	€17,500	€8,500	€4,500	—N/a	—N/a	—N/a	—N/a	—N/a	—N/a	—N/a
Wheelchair doubles *	€10,000	€5,000	€3,000	—N/a	—N/a	—N/a	—N/a	—N/a	—N/a	—N/a	—N/a

_{* per team}

== Singles players ==
2018 French Open – Men's singles

Champion		Runner-up	
(Spain) Rafael Nadal [1]		(Austria) Dominic Thiem [7]	
Semifinals out
(Argentina) Juan Martín del Potro [5]		(Italy) Marco Cecchinato	
Quarterfinals out
(Argentina) Diego Schwartzman [11]	(Croatia) Marin Čilić [3]	(Serbia) Novak Djokovic [20]	(Germany) Alexander Zverev Jr. [2]
4th round out
(Germany) Maximilian Marterer	(South Africa) Kevin Anderson [6]	(Italy) Fabio Fognini [18]	(United States) John Isner [9]
(Belgium) David Goffin [8]	(Spain) Fernando Verdasco [30]	(Japan) Kei Nishikori [19]	(Russia) Karen Khachanov
3rd round out
(France) Richard Gasquet [27]	(Estonia) Jürgen Zopp (LL)	(Croatia) Borna Ćorić	(Germany) Mischa Zverev
(United States) Steve Johnson	(United Kingdom) Kyle Edmund [16]	(France) Pierre-Hugues Herbert	(Spain) Albert Ramos Viñolas [31]
(France) Gaël Monfils [32]	(Spain) Pablo Carreño Busta [10]	(Spain) Roberto Bautista Agut [13]	(Bulgaria) Grigor Dimitrov [4]
(Italy) Matteo Berrettini	(France) Gilles Simon	(France) Lucas Pouille [15]	(Bosnia and Herzegovina) Damir Džumhur [26]
2nd round out
(Argentina) Guido Pella	(Tunisia) Malek Jaziri	(Canada) Denis Shapovalov [24]	(Belgium) Ruben Bemelmans (LL)
(Czech Republic) Adam Pavlásek (Q)	(Italy) Thomas Fabbiano	(Ukraine) Sergiy Stakhovsky (LL)	(Uruguay) Pablo Cuevas
(Poland) Hubert Hurkacz (Q)	(Germany) Jan-Lennard Struff	(Sweden) Elias Ymer (Q)	(Hungary) Márton Fucsovics
(Argentina) Horacio Zeballos	(France) Jérémy Chardy	(Norway) Casper Ruud (Q)	(France) Julien Benneteau
(France) Corentin Moutet (WC)	(Slovakia) Martin Kližan (Q)	(Argentina) Marco Trungelliti (LL)	(Argentina) Federico Delbonis
(Colombia) Santiago Giraldo (Q)	(Spain) Jaume Munar (Q)	(Argentina) Guido Andreozzi (Q)	(United States) Jared Donaldson
(Greece) Stefanos Tsitsipas	(Latvia) Ernests Gulbis (Q)	(France) Benoît Paire	(United States) Sam Querrey [12]
(United Kingdom) Cameron Norrie	(Spain) Guillermo García López	(Moldova) Radu Albot	(Serbia) Dušan Lajović
1st round out
(Italy) Simone Bolelli (LL)	(Portugal) João Sousa	(Russia) Mikhail Youzhny	(Italy) Andreas Seppi
(Australia) John Millman	(United States) Ryan Harrison	(India) Yuki Bhambri	(United States) Jack Sock [14]
(France) Calvin Hemery (WC)	(Bosnia and Herzegovina) Mirza Bašić	(Australia) Matthew Ebden	(Germany) Philipp Kohlschreiber [22]
(Spain) Feliciano López [28]	(Germany) Florian Mayer	(Slovenia) Aljaž Bedene	(Italy) Paolo Lorenzi
(Australia) James Duckworth (PR)	(United States) Tennys Sandgren	(Russia) Evgeny Donskoy	(France) Adrian Mannarino [25]
(Spain) Pablo Andújar (PR)	(Israel) Dudi Sela	(Canada) Vasek Pospisil	(Australia) Alex de Minaur (WC)
(United States) Noah Rubin (WC)	(Japan) Yūichi Sugita	(Canada) Peter Polansky (LL)	(Czech Republic) Tomáš Berdych [17]
(Kazakhstan) Mikhail Kukushkin	(Australia) Jordan Thompson	(Argentina) Leonardo Mayer	(France) Nicolas Mahut (WC)
(Netherlands) Robin Haase	(Croatia) Ivo Karlović	(Serbia) Laslo Đere	(France) Elliot Benchetrit (WC)
(Australia) Bernard Tomic (Q)	(Romania) Marius Copil	(Brazil) Thomaz Bellucci (Q)	(Slovakia) Jozef Kovalík (Q)
(Uzbekistan) Denis Istomin	(Cyprus) Marcos Baghdatis	(Spain) David Ferrer	(Brazil) Rogério Dutra Silva (Q)
(Japan) Yoshihito Nishioka (PR)	(United States) Taylor Fritz	(Chile) Nicolás Jarry	(Egypt) Mohamed Safwat (LL)
(Belarus) Ilya Ivashka (Q)	(Spain) Carlos Taberner (Q)	(Germany) Oscar Otte (LL)	(Luxembourg) Gilles Müller [29]
(France) Maxime Janvier (WC)	(Spain) Roberto Carballés Baena	(Georgia (country)) Nikoloz Basilashvili	(United States) Frances Tiafoe
(Russia) Daniil Medvedev	(Germany) Peter Gojowczyk	(Austria) Andreas Haider-Maurer (PR)	(Switzerland) Stan Wawrinka [23]
(United States) Denis Kudla (Q)	(France) Grégoire Barrère (WC)	(Czech Republic) Jiří Veselý	(Lithuania) Ričardas Berankis

2018 French Open – Women's singles

Champion		Runner-up	
(Romania) Simona Halep [1]		(United States) Sloane Stephens [10]	
Semifinals out
(Spain) Garbiñe Muguruza [3]		(United States) Madison Keys [13]	
Quarterfinals out
(Germany) Angelique Kerber [12]	(Russia) Maria Sharapova [28]	(Kazakhstan) Yulia Putintseva	(Russia) Daria Kasatkina [14]
4th round out
(Belgium) Elise Mertens [16]	(France) Caroline Garcia [7]	(Ukraine) Lesia Tsurenko	(United States) Serena Williams (PR)
(Czech Republic) Barbora Strýcová [26]	(Romania) Mihaela Buzărnescu [31]	(Estonia) Anett Kontaveit [25]	(Denmark) Caroline Wozniacki [2]
3rd round out
(Germany) Andrea Petkovic	(Australia) Daria Gavrilova [24]	(Netherlands) Kiki Bertens [18]	(Romania) Irina-Camelia Begu
(Australia) Samantha Stosur	(Slovakia) Magdaléna Rybáriková [19]	(Germany) Julia Görges [11]	(Czech Republic) Karolína Plíšková [6]
(Czech Republic) Kateřina Siniaková	(China) Wang Qiang	(Japan) Naomi Osaka [21]	(Ukraine) Elina Svitolina [4]
(Czech Republic) Petra Kvitová [8]	(Italy) Camila Giorgi	(Greece) Maria Sakkari	(France) Pauline Parmentier (WC)
2nd round out
(United States) Taylor Townsend (WC)	(United States) Bethanie Mattek-Sands (PR)	(United States) Bernarda Pera	(United Kingdom) Heather Watson
(Romania) Ana Bogdan	(Belarus) Aliaksandra Sasnovich	(China) Zhang Shuai [27]	(China) Peng Shuai
(France) Fiona Ferro (WC)	(Russia) Anastasia Pavlyuchenkova [30]	(Switzerland) Belinda Bencic	(United States) CoCo Vandeweghe [15]
(Belgium) Alison Van Uytvanck	(Australia) Ashleigh Barty [17]	(Croatia) Donna Vekić	(Czech Republic) Lucie Šafářová
(Ukraine) Kateryna Kozlova	(Russia) Ekaterina Makarova	(United States) Jennifer Brady	(Croatia) Petra Martić
(United States) Caroline Dolehide (Q)	(Kazakhstan) Zarina Diyas	(Sweden) Rebecca Peterson (Q)	(Slovakia) Viktória Kužmová
(Spain) Lara Arruabarrena	(Romania) Alexandra Dulgheru (Q)	(Colombia) Mariana Duque Mariño (Q)	(Poland) Magdalena Fręch (Q)
(Belgium) Kirsten Flipkens	(Spain) Carla Suárez Navarro [23]	(France) Alizé Cornet [32]	(Spain) Georgina García Pérez (Q)
1st round out
(United States) Alison Riske	(France) Myrtille Georges (WC)	(Sweden) Johanna Larsson	(France) Kristina Mladenovic [29]
(Romania) Sorana Cîrstea	(Russia) Elena Vesnina	(France) Océane Dodin	(United States) Varvara Lepchenko
(Germany) Mona Barthel	(Czech Republic) Markéta Vondroušová	(Czech Republic) Denisa Allertová	(Belarus) Aryna Sabalenka
(Slovakia) Kristína Kučová (PR)	(Slovakia) Anna Karolína Schmiedlová	(Serbia) Aleksandra Krunić	(China) Duan Yingying
(Russia) Svetlana Kuznetsova	(Germany) Carina Witthöft	(Belgium) Yanina Wickmayer	(Slovenia) Polona Hercog
(Thailand) Luksika Kumkhum	(Italy) Deborah Chiesa (Q)	(Switzerland) Stefanie Vögele	(Germany) Laura Siegemund
(Slovakia) Dominika Cibulková	(Australia) Isabelle Wallace (WC)	(Czech Republic) Kristýna Plíšková	(Russia) Natalia Vikhlyantseva
(Netherlands) Richèl Hogenkamp (Q)	(Ukraine) Kateryna Bondarenko	(France) Jessika Ponchet (WC)	(Czech Republic) Barbora Krejčíková (Q)
(Latvia) Jeļena Ostapenko [5]	(Belarus) Victoria Azarenka (PR)	(China) Zheng Saisai (PR)	(Japan) Kurumi Nara
(United Kingdom) Johanna Konta [22]	(France) Amandine Hesse (WC)	(China) Wang Yafan	(United States) Venus Williams [9]
(United States) Sachia Vickery	(Switzerland) Viktorija Golubic (Q)	(Poland) Magda Linette	(United States) Sofia Kenin
(United States) Vania King (PR)	(Chinese Taipei) Hsieh Su-wei	(Italy) Francesca Schiavone (Q)	(Australia) Ajla Tomljanović
(Paraguay) Verónica Cepede Royg	(Hungary) Tímea Babos	(United States) Christina McHale	(United States) Madison Brengle
(Latvia) Anastasija Sevastova [20]	(United States) Grace Min (Q)	(Russia) Ekaterina Alexandrova	(Netherlands) Arantxa Rus (LL)
(Estonia) Kaia Kanepi	(Germany) Tatjana Maria	(Luxembourg) Mandy Minella (PR)	(Croatia) Ana Konjuh
(Italy) Sara Errani	(France) Chloé Paquet (WC)	(Slovenia) Dalila Jakupović (LL)	(United States) Danielle Collins

== Singles seeds ==
The following are the seeded players and notable players who have withdrawn from the event. Seedings are based on ATP and WTA rankings as of 21 May 2018. Rank and points before are as of 28 May 2018.

=== Men's singles ===
Seed	Rank	Player	Points before	Points defending	Points won	Points after	Status
1	1	(Spain) Rafael Nadal	8,770	2,000	2,000	8,770	Champion, defeated (Austria) Dominic Thiem [7]
2	3	(Germany) Alexander Zverev	5,615	10	360	5,965	Quarterfinals lost to (Austria) Dominic Thiem [7]
3	4	(Croatia) Marin Čilić	4,950	360	360	4,950	Quarterfinals lost to (Argentina) Juan Martín del Potro [5]
4	5	(Bulgaria) Grigor Dimitrov	4,870	90	90	4,870	Third round lost to (Spain) Fernando Verdasco [30]
5	6	(Argentina) Juan Martín del Potro	4,450	90	720	5,080	Semifinals lost to (Spain) Rafael Nadal [1]
6	7	(South Africa) Kevin Anderson	3,635	180	180	3,635	Fourth round lost to (Argentina) Diego Schwartzman [11]
7	8	(Austria) Dominic Thiem	3,355	720	1,200	3,835	Runner-up, lost to (Spain) Rafael Nadal [1]
8	9	(Belgium) David Goffin	3,020	90	180	3,110	Fourth round lost to (Italy) Marco Cecchinato
9	10	(United States) John Isner	2,980	90	180	3,070	Fourth round lost to (Argentina) Juan Martín del Potro [5]
10	11	(Spain) Pablo Carreño Busta	2,415	360	90	2,145	Third round lost to (Italy) Marco Cecchinato
11	12	(Argentina) Diego Schwartzman	2,165	90	360	2,435	Quarterfinals lost to (Spain) Rafael Nadal [1]
12	15	(United States) Sam Querrey	2,095	10	45	2,130	Second round lost to (France) Gilles Simon
13	13	(Spain) Roberto Bautista Agut	2,120	180	90	1,985	Third round lost (Serbia) Novak Djokovic [20]
14	14	(United States) Jack Sock	2,110	10	10	2,110	First round lost to (Estonia) Jürgen Zopp [LL]
15	16	(France) Lucas Pouille	2,030	90	90	2,030	Third round lost to (Russia) Karen Khachanov
16	17	(United Kingdom) Kyle Edmund	1,950	90	90	1,950	Third round lost to (Italy) Fabio Fognini [18]
17	20	(Czech Republic) Tomáš Berdych	1,750	45	10	1,715	First round lost to (France) Jérémy Chardy
18	18	(Italy) Fabio Fognini	1,940	90	180	2,030	Fourth round lost to (Croatia) Marin Čilić [3]
19	21	(Japan) Kei Nishikori	1,710	360	180	1,530	Fourth round lost to (Austria) Dominic Thiem [7]
20	22	(Serbia) Novak Djokovic	1,665	360	360	1,665	Quarterfinals lost to (Italy) Marco Cecchinato
~~21~~	~~23~~	~~(Australia) Nick Kyrgios~~	1,630	45	0	1,585	Withdrew due to elbow injury
22	24	(Germany) Philipp Kohlschreiber	1,620	10	10	1,620	First round lost to (Croatia) Borna Ćorić
23	30	(Switzerland) Stan Wawrinka	1,400	1,200	10	210	First round lost to (Spain) Guillermo García López
24	25	(Canada) Denis Shapovalov	1,573	(10)^{†}	45	1,608	Second round lost to (Germany) Maximilian Marterer
25	26	(France) Adrian Mannarino	1,535	10	10	1,535	First round lost to (United States) Steve Johnson
26	29	(Bosnia and Herzegovina) Damir Džumhur	1,415	10	90	1,495	Third round lost to (Germany) Alexander Zverev [2]
27	32	(France) Richard Gasquet	1,395	90	90	1,395	Third round lost to (Spain) Rafael Nadal [1]
28	33	(Spain) Feliciano López	1,375	90	10	1,295	First round lost to (Ukraine) Sergiy Stakhovsky [LL]
29	34	(Luxembourg) Gilles Müller	1,300	10	10	1,300	First round lost to (Latvia) Ernests Gulbis [Q]
30	35	(Spain) Fernando Verdasco	1,280	180	180	1,280	Fourth round lost to (Serbia) Novak Djokovic [20]
31	36	(Spain) Albert Ramos Viñolas	1,260	180	90	1,170	Third round lost to (Argentina) Juan Martín del Potro [5]
32	37	(France) Gaël Monfils	1,220	180	90	1,130	Third round lost to (Belgium) David Goffin [8]

==== Withdrawn players ====
Rank	Player	Points before	Points defending	Points after	Withdrawal reason
2	(Switzerland) Roger Federer	8,670	0	8,670	Scheduling
19	(South Korea) Chung Hyeon	1,775	90	1,685	Ankle injury
27	(Serbia) Filip Krajinović	1,506	(15)^{†}	1,491	Leg injury
28	(Canada) Milos Raonic	1,435	180	1,255	Right knee injury
31	(Russia) Andrey Rublev	1,397	26	1,371	Back injury

† The player did not qualify for the tournament in 2017. Accordingly, this was the points defended from the 2017 ATP Challenger Tour.

=== Women's singles ===
Seed	Rank	Player	Points before	Points defending	Points won	Points after	Status
1	1	(Romania) Simona Halep	7,270	1,300	2,000	7,970	Champion, defeated (United States) Sloane Stephens [10]
2	2	(Denmark) Caroline Wozniacki	6,935	430	240	6,745	Fourth round lost to (Russia) Daria Kasatkina [14]
3	3	(Spain) Garbiñe Muguruza	6,010	240	780	6,550	Semifinals lost to (Romania) Simona Halep [1]
4	4	(Ukraine) Elina Svitolina	5,505	430	130	5,205	Third round lost to (Romania) Mihaela Buzărnescu [31]
5	5	(Latvia) Jeļena Ostapenko	5,382	2,000	10	3,392	First round lost to (Ukraine) Kateryna Kozlova
6	6	(Czech Republic) Karolína Plíšková	5,335	780	130	4,685	Third round lost to (Russia) Maria Sharapova [28]
7	7	(France) Caroline Garcia	5,160	430	240	4,970	Fourth round lost to (Germany) Angelique Kerber [12]
8	8	(Czech Republic) Petra Kvitová	4,550	70	130	4,610	Third round lost to (Estonia) Anett Kontaveit [25]
9	9	(United States) Venus Williams	4,201	240	10	3,971	First round lost to (China) Wang Qiang
10	10	(United States) Sloane Stephens	4,164	(1)^{†}	1,300	5,463	Runner-up, lost to (Romania) Simona Halep [1]
11	11	(Germany) Julia Görges	3,090	10	130	3,210	Third round lost to (United States) Serena Williams [PR]
12	12	(Germany) Angelique Kerber	3,040	10	430	3,460	Quarterfinals lost to (Romania) Simona Halep [1]
13	13	(United States) Madison Keys	2,826	70	780	3,536	Semifinals lost to (United States) Sloane Stephens [10]
14	14	(Russia) Daria Kasatkina	2,825	130	430	3,125	Quarterfinals lost to (United States) Sloane Stephens [10]
15	15	(United States) CoCo Vandeweghe	2,533	10	70	2,593	Second round lost to (Ukraine) Lesia Tsurenko
16	16	(Belgium) Elise Mertens	2,525	130	240	2,635	Fourth round lost to (Romania) Simona Halep [1]
17	17	(Australia) Ashleigh Barty	2,360	10	70	2,420	Second round lost to (United States) Serena Williams [PR]
18	22	(Netherlands) Kiki Bertens	2,030	70	130	2,090	Third round lost to (Germany) Angelique Kerber [12]
19	18	(Slovakia) Magdaléna Rybáriková	2,225	70+140	130+55	2,200	Third round lost to (Ukraine) Lesia Tsurenko
20	19	(Latvia) Anastasija Sevastova	2,225	130	10	2,105	First round lost to (Colombia) Mariana Duque Mariño [Q]
21	20	(Japan) Naomi Osaka	2,150	10	130	2,270	Third round lost to (United States) Madison Keys [13]
22	21	(United Kingdom) Johanna Konta	2,050	10	10	2,050	First round lost to (Kazakhstan) Yulia Putintseva
23	23	(Spain) Carla Suárez Navarro	1,876	240	70	1,706	Second round lost to (Greece) Maria Sakkari
24	25	(Australia) Daria Gavrilova	1,690	10	130	1,810	Third round lost to (Belgium) Elise Mertens [16]
25	24	(Estonia) Anett Kontaveit	1,765	70	240	1,935	Fourth round lost to (United States) Sloane Stephens [10]
26	26	(Czech Republic) Barbora Strýcová	1,660	70	240	1,830	Fourth round lost to (Kazakhstan) Yulia Putintseva
27	27	(China) Zhang Shuai	1,605	130	70	1,545	Second round lost to (Romania) Irina-Camelia Begu
28	30	(Russia) Maria Sharapova	1,513	0	430	1,943	Quarterfinals lost to (Spain) Garbiñe Muguruza [3]
29	31	(France) Kristina Mladenovic	1,446	430	10	1,026	First round lost to (Germany) Andrea Petkovic
30	28	(Russia) Anastasia Pavlyuchenkova	1,596	70	70	1,596	Second round lost (Australia) Samantha Stosur
31	33	(Romania) Mihaela Buzărnescu	1,383	(80)^{†}	240	1,543	Fourth round lost to (United States) Madison Keys [13]
32	34	(France) Alizé Cornet	1,350	240	70	1,180	Second round lost to (France) Pauline Parmentier [WC]

† The player did not qualify for the tournament in 2017. Accordingly, points for her 16th best result are deducted instead.

==== Withdrawn players ====
Rank	Player	Points before	Points defending	Points after	Withdrawal reason
29	(Poland) Agnieszka Radwańska	1,526	130	1,396	Back injury

== Doubles seeds ==
=== Men's doubles ===
Team		Rank^{1}	Seed
(Poland) Łukasz Kubot	(Brazil) Marcelo Melo	5	1
(Austria) Oliver Marach	(Croatia) Mate Pavić	5	2
(Finland) Henri Kontinen	(Australia) John Peers	15	3
(United Kingdom) Jamie Murray	(Brazil) Bruno Soares	23	4
(Colombia) Juan Sebastián Cabal	(Colombia) Robert Farah	24	5
(France) Pierre-Hugues Herbert	(France) Nicolas Mahut	37	6
(Pakistan) Aisam-ul-Haq Qureshi	(Netherlands) Jean-Julien Rojer	42	7
(Croatia) Nikola Mektić	(Austria) Alexander Peya	44	8
(Croatia) Ivan Dodig	(United States) Rajeev Ram	45	9
(South Africa) Raven Klaasen	(New Zealand) Michael Venus	46	10
(Uruguay) Pablo Cuevas	(Spain) Marcel Granollers	47	11
(Spain) Feliciano López	(Spain) Marc López	48	12
(India) Rohan Bopanna	(France) Édouard Roger-Vasselin	52	13
(Japan) Ben McLachlan	(Germany) Jan-Lennard Struff	61	14
(Chile) Julio Peralta	(Argentina) Horacio Zeballos	71	15
(United States) Mike Bryan	(United States) Sam Querrey	74	16

- ^{1} Rankings are as of 21 May 2018.

=== Women's doubles ===
Team		Rank^{1}	Seed
(Hungary) Tímea Babos	(France) Kristina Mladenovic	12	1
(Czech Republic) Andrea Sestini Hlaváčková	(Czech Republic) Barbora Strýcová	13	2
(Slovenia) Andreja Klepač	(Spain) María José Martínez Sánchez	26	3
(Chinese Taipei) Latisha Chan	(United States) Bethanie Mattek-Sands	28	4
(Canada) Gabriela Dabrowski	(China) Xu Yifan	28	5
(Czech Republic) Barbora Krejčíková	(Czech Republic) Kateřina Siniaková	34	6
(Australia) Ashleigh Barty	(United States) CoCo Vandeweghe	38	7
(Chinese Taipei) Chan Hao-ching	(China) Yang Zhaoxuan	38	8
(Netherlands) Kiki Bertens	(Sweden) Johanna Larsson	42	9
(Latvia) Jeļena Ostapenko	(Russia) Elena Vesnina	47	10
(United States) Raquel Atawo	(Germany) Anna-Lena Grönefeld	50	11
(Belgium) Elise Mertens	(Netherlands) Demi Schuurs	53	12
(United States) Nicole Melichar	(Czech Republic) Květa Peschke	53	13
(Japan) Shuko Aoyama	(Japan) Miyu Kato	84	14
(Poland) Alicja Rosolska	(United States) Abigail Spears	84	15
(Ukraine) Nadiia Kichenok	(Australia) Anastasia Rodionova	91	16

- ^{1} Rankings are as of 21 May 2018.

=== Mixed doubles ===
Team		Rank^{1}	Seed
(Canada) Gabriela Dabrowski	(Croatia) Mate Pavić	12	1
(Chinese Taipei) Latisha Chan	(Croatia) Ivan Dodig	17	2
(China) Xu Yifan	(Austria) Oliver Marach	19	3
(Czech Republic) Kateřina Siniaková	(United Kingdom) Jamie Murray	21	4
(Slovenia) Andreja Klepač	(Netherlands) Jean-Julien Rojer	23	5
(Chinese Taipei) Chan Hao-ching	(New Zealand) Michael Venus	26	6
(Hungary) Tímea Babos	(India) Rohan Bopanna	28	7
(Germany) Anna-Lena Grönefeld	(Colombia) Robert Farah	31	8

- ^{1} Rankings are as of 28 May 2018.

== Main draw wildcard entries ==
The following players were given wildcards (wc) to the main draw based on internal selection and recent performances.

=== Men's singles ===
- (France) Grégoire Barrère
- (France) Elliot Benchetrit
- (Australia) Alex de Minaur
- (France) Calvin Hemery
- (France) Maxime Janvier
- (France) Nicolas Mahut
- (France) Corentin Moutet
- (United States) Noah Rubin

=== Women's singles ===
- (France) Fiona Ferro
- (France) Myrtille Georges
- (France) Amandine Hesse
- (France) Chloé Paquet
- (France) Pauline Parmentier
- (France) Jessika Ponchet
- (United States) Taylor Townsend
- (Australia) Isabelle Wallace

=== Men's doubles ===
- (France) Geoffrey Blancaneaux / (France) Constant Lestienne
- (France) Benjamin Bonzi / (France) Grégoire Jacq
- (France) Jérémy Chardy / (Canada) Daniel Nestor
- (France) Corentin Denolly / (France) Alexandre Müller
- (France) Hugo Gaston / (France) Clément Tabur
- (France) Antoine Hoang / (France) Ugo Humbert
- (France) Florian Lakat / (France) Arthur Rinderknech

=== Women's doubles ===
- (France) Tessah Andrianjafitrimo / (France) Fiona Ferro
- (France) Manon Arcangioli / (France) Shérazad Reix
- (France) Clara Burel / (France) Diane Parry
- (France) Sara Cakarevic / (France) Jessika Ponchet
- (France) Amandine Hesse / (France) Pauline Parmentier
- (France) Virginie Razzano / (France) Jade Suvrijn
- (United States) Serena Williams / (United States) Venus Williams

=== Mixed doubles ===
- (France) Tessah Andrianjafitrimo / (France) Ugo Humbert
- (France) Sara Cakarevic / (France) Alexandre Müller
- (France) Fiona Ferro / (France) Evan Furness
- (France) Kristina Mladenovic / (France) Alexis Musialek
- (France) Chloé Paquet / (France) Benoît Paire
- (France) Pauline Parmentier / (France) Grégoire Barrère

== Main draw qualifiers ==
=== Men's singles ===
1. (Czech Republic) Adam Pavlásek
2. (Belarus) Ilya Ivashka
3. (Brazil) Thomaz Bellucci
4. (Latvia) Ernests Gulbis
5. (Norway) Casper Ruud
6. (Brazil) Rogério Dutra Silva
7. (United States) Denis Kudla
8. (Colombia) Santiago Giraldo
9. (Argentina) Guido Andreozzi
10. (Slovakia) Martin Kližan
11. (Spain) Jaume Munar
12. (Australia) Bernard Tomic
13. (Sweden) Elias Ymer
14. (Slovakia) Jozef Kovalík
15. (Poland) Hubert Hurkacz
16. (Spain) Carlos Taberner

==== Lucky losers ====
1. (Ukraine) Sergiy Stakhovsky
2. (Canada) Peter Polansky
3. (Estonia) Jürgen Zopp
4. (Germany) Oscar Otte
5. (Italy) Simone Bolelli
6. (Belgium) Ruben Bemelmans
7. (Egypt) Mohamed Safwat
8. (Argentina) Marco Trungelliti

=== Women's singles ===
1. (Netherlands) Richèl Hogenkamp
2. (Sweden) Rebecca Peterson
3. (Italy) Deborah Chiesa
4. (United States) Caroline Dolehide
5. (Poland) Magdalena Fręch
6. (Switzerland) Viktorija Golubic
7. (Colombia) Mariana Duque Mariño
8. (Czech Republic) Barbora Krejčíková
9. (Spain) Georgina García Pérez
10. (Italy) Francesca Schiavone
11. (United States) Grace Min
12. (Romania) Alexandra Dulgheru

==== Lucky losers ====
1. (Netherlands) Arantxa Rus
2. (Slovenia) Dalila Jakupović

== Protected ranking ==
The following players were accepted directly into the main draw using a protected ranking:

Men's singles

- (Austria) Andreas Haider-Maurer (63)
- (Japan) Yoshihito Nishioka (66)
- (Spain) Pablo Andújar (105)
- (Australia) James Duckworth (105)

Women's singles

- (United States) Serena Williams (1)
- (Belarus) Victoria Azarenka (6)
- (China) Zheng Saisai (88)
- (United States) Bethanie Mattek-Sands (90)
- (Slovakia) Kristína Kučová (95)
- (United States) Vania King (103)
- (Luxembourg) Mandy Minella (104)

== Withdrawals ==
The following players were accepted directly into the main draw, but withdrew with injuries or other reasons.

Before the tournament

Men's singles

- ‡ (Switzerland) Roger Federer (2) → replaced by (Serbia) Laslo Đere (102)
- ‡ (Germany) Cedrik-Marcel Stebe (101) → replaced by (Italy) Thomas Fabbiano (103)
- ‡ (United Kingdom) Andy Murray (29) → replaced by (United Kingdom) Cameron Norrie (104)
- ‡ (Belgium) Steve Darcis (90 PR) → replaced by (Italy) Matteo Berrettini (105)
- ‡ (France) Jo-Wilfried Tsonga (35) → replaced by (Spain) Pablo Andújar (105 PR)
- ‡ (Canada) Milos Raonic (22) → replaced by (Australia) James Duckworth (105 PR)
- † (South Korea) Chung Hyeon (19) → replaced by (Ukraine) Sergiy Stakhovsky (LL)
- † (Serbia) Filip Krajinović (27) → replaced by (Estonia) Jürgen Zopp (LL)
- † (Russia) Andrey Rublev (33) → replaced by (Canada) Peter Polansky (LL)
- † (Argentina) Nicolás Kicker (90) → replaced by (Germany) Oscar Otte (LL)
- § (Ukraine) Alexandr Dolgopolov (53) → replaced by (Italy) Simone Bolelli (LL)
- § (Chinese Taipei) Lu Yen-hsun (98) → replaced by (Belgium) Ruben Bemelmans (LL)
- § (Serbia) Viktor Troicki (70) → replaced by (Egypt) Mohamed Safwat (LL)
- § (Australia) Nick Kyrgios (25) → replaced by (Argentina) Marco Trungelliti (LL)

Women's singles

- ‡ (Puerto Rico) Monica Puig (67) → replaced by (China) Duan Yingying (104)
- ‡ (Poland) Agnieszka Radwańska (29) → replaced by (Luxembourg) Mandy Minella (104 PR)
- ‡ (United States) Catherine Bellis (44) → replaced by (Slovakia) Viktória Kužmová (106)
- ‡ (Brazil) Beatriz Haddad Maia (63) → replaced by (Belgium) Yanina Wickmayer (107)
- † (Romania) Monica Niculescu (64) → replaced by (Netherlands) Arantxa Rus (LL)
- § (Switzerland) Timea Bacsinszky (46) → replaced by (Slovenia) Dalila Jakupović (LL)

‡ – withdrew from entry list before qualifying began
† – withdrew from entry list after qualifying began
§ – withdrew from main draw

During the tournament
Women's singles

- (United States) Serena Williams

== Retirements ==
Men's singles

- (Cyprus) Marcos Baghdatis
- (Germany) Peter Gojowczyk

Women's singles

- (Ukraine) Lesia Tsurenko

== Champions ==
=== Seniors ===
==== Men's singles ====
- (Spain) Rafael Nadal def. (Austria) Dominic Thiem, 6–4, 6–3, 6–2

==== Women's singles ====
- (Romania) Simona Halep def. (United States) Sloane Stephens, 3–6, 6–4, 6–1

==== Men's doubles ====
- (France) Pierre-Hugues Herbert / (France) Nicolas Mahut def. (Austria) Oliver Marach / (Croatia) Mate Pavić, 6–2, 7–6^{(7–4)}

==== Women's doubles ====
- (Czech Republic) Barbora Krejčíková / (Czech Republic) Kateřina Siniaková def. (Japan) Eri Hozumi / (Japan) Makoto Ninomiya, 6–3, 6–3

==== Mixed doubles ====
- (Chinese Taipei) Latisha Chan / (Croatia) Ivan Dodig def. (Canada) Gabriela Dabrowski / (Croatia) Mate Pavić, 6–1, 6–7^{(5–7)}, [10–8]

=== Juniors ===
==== Boys' singles ====
- (Chinese Taipei) Tseng Chun-hsin def. (Argentina) Sebastián Báez, 7–6^{(7–5)}, 6–2

==== Girls' singles ====
- (United States) Coco Gauff def. (United States) Caty McNally, 1–6, 6–3, 7–6^{(7–1)}

==== Boys' doubles ====
- (Czech Republic) Ondřej Štyler / (Japan) Naoki Tajima def. (Chinese Taipei) Ray Ho / (Chinese Taipei) Tseng Chun-hsin, 6–4, 6–4

==== Girls' doubles ====
- (United States) Caty McNally / (Poland) Iga Świątek def. (Japan) Yuki Naito / (Japan) Naho Sato, 6–2, 7–5

=== Wheelchair events ===
==== Wheelchair men's singles ====
- (Japan) Shingo Kunieda def. (Argentina) Gustavo Fernández, 7–6^{(7–5)}, 6–0

==== Wheelchair women's singles ====
- (Japan) Yui Kamiji def. (Netherlands) Diede de Groot, 2–6, 6–0, 6–2

==== Wheelchair men's doubles ====
- (France) Stéphane Houdet / (France) Nicolas Peifer def. (France) Frédéric Cattanéo / (Sweden) Stefan Olsson, 6–1, 7–6^{(7–5)}

==== Wheelchair women's doubles ====
- (Netherlands) Diede de Groot / (Netherlands) Aniek van Koot def. (Netherlands) Marjolein Buis / (Japan) Yui Kamiji, 6–1, 6–3

=== Other events ===
==== Legends under 45 doubles ====
- (Spain) Àlex Corretja / (Spain) Juan Carlos Ferrero def. (Russia) Yevgeny Kafelnikov / (Russia) Marat Safin, 6–3, 6–3

==== Legends over 45 doubles ====
- (France) Mansour Bahrami / (France) Fabrice Santoro def. (United States) John McEnroe / (France) Cédric Pioline, 6–1, 2–6, [12–10]

==== Women's legends doubles ====
- (France) Nathalie Dechy / (France) Amélie Mauresmo def. (Belgium) Kim Clijsters / (France) Nathalie Tauziat, 6–7^{(4–7)}, 6–4, [15–13]

Preceded by 2017 French Open	French Open	Succeeded by 2019 French Open

Preceded by 2018 Australian Open	Grand Slam events	Succeeded by 2018 Wimbledon Championships
