= 2018 French Open – Women's doubles =

Women's doubles
- 2018 French Open

Final
- Champions: (Czech Republic) Barbora Krejčíková (Czech Republic) Kateřina Siniaková
- Runners-up: (Japan) Eri Hozumi (Japan) Makoto Ninomiya
- Score: 6–3, 6–3

Events
Singles	men	women		boys	girls
Doubles	men	women	mixed	boys	girls
WC Singles	men	women	quad
WC Doubles	men	women	quad
Legends	−45	45+	women
← 2017 ·	French Open	· 2019 →

Barbora Krejčíková and Kateřina Siniaková defeated Eri Hozumi and Makoto Ninomiya in the final, 6–3, 6–3 to win the women's doubles tennis title at the 2018 French Open. It was their first major title together.

Bethanie Mattek-Sands and Lucie Šafářová were the defending champions, but did not compete together this year. Mattek-Sands partnered Latisha Chan, but was defeated in the second round by Irina Bara and Mihaela Buzărnescu. Šafářová partnered Svetlana Kuznetsova, but was defeated in the second round by Sorana Cîrstea and Sara Sorribes Tormo.

Despite losing in the first round with different partners, Ekaterina Makarova and Elena Vesnina jointly attained the world No. 1 doubles ranking at the end of the tournament. Chan and Tímea Babos were also in contention for the top ranking.

== Seeds ==
1. (Hungary) Tímea Babos / (France) Kristina Mladenovic (quarterfinals)
2. (Czech Republic) Andrea Sestini Hlaváčková / (Czech Republic) Barbora Strýcová (semifinals)
3. (Slovenia) Andreja Klepač / (Spain) María José Martínez Sánchez (quarterfinals)
4. (Chinese Taipei) Latisha Chan / (United States) Bethanie Mattek-Sands (second round)
5. (Canada) Gabriela Dabrowski / (China) Xu Yifan (third round)
6. (Czech Republic) Barbora Krejčíková / (Czech Republic) Kateřina Siniaková (champions)
7. (Australia) Ashleigh Barty / (United States) CoCo Vandeweghe (first round)
8. (Chinese Taipei) Chan Hao-ching / (China) Yang Zhaoxuan (semifinals)

9. (Netherlands) Kiki Bertens / (Sweden) Johanna Larsson (third round)
10. (Latvia) Jeļena Ostapenko / (Russia) Elena Vesnina (first round)
11. (United States) Raquel Atawo / (Germany) Anna-Lena Grönefeld (second round)
12. (Belgium) Elise Mertens / (Netherlands) Demi Schuurs (first round)
13. (United States) Nicole Melichar / (Czech Republic) Květa Peschke (third round)
14. (Japan) Shuko Aoyama / (Japan) Miyu Kato (first round)
15. (Poland) Alicja Rosolska / (United States) Abigail Spears (first round)
16. (Ukraine) Nadiia Kichenok / (Australia) Anastasia Rodionova (second round)

== Draw ==
=== Key ===
- Q = Qualifier
- WC = Wild card
- LL = Lucky loser
- Alt = Alternate
- SE = Special exempt
- PR = Protected ranking
- ITF = ITF entry
- JE = Junior exempt
- w/o = Walkover
- r = Retired
- d = Defaulted
- SR = Special ranking

=== Finals ===
Quarterfinals
1	(Hungary) Tímea Babos (France) Kristina Mladenovic	6^{4}	3
(Japan) Eri Hozumi (Japan) Makoto Ninomiya	7^{7}	6
(Romania) Irina Bara (Romania) Mihaela Buzărnescu	3	6	4
8	(Chinese Taipei) Chan Hao-ching (China) Yang Zhaoxuan	6	1	6
6	(Czech Republic) Barbora Krejčíková (Czech Republic) Kateřina Siniaková	6	6
3	(Slovenia) Andreja Klepač (Spain) María José Martínez Sánchez	3	3
(Spain) Lara Arruabarrena (Slovenia) Katarina Srebotnik	3	1
2	(Czech Republic) Andrea Sestini Hlaváčková (Czech Republic) Barbora Strýcová	6	6

Semifinals
(Japan) Eri Hozumi (Japan) Makoto Ninomiya	6	6
8	(Chinese Taipei) Chan Hao-ching (China) Yang Zhaoxuan	2	2
6	(Czech Republic) Barbora Krejčíková (Czech Republic) Kateřina Siniaková	6	6
2	(Czech Republic) Andrea Sestini Hlaváčková (Czech Republic) Barbora Strýcová	3	2

Final
(Japan) Eri Hozumi (Japan) Makoto Ninomiya	3	3
6	(Czech Republic) Barbora Krejčíková (Czech Republic) Kateřina Siniaková	6	6

=== Top half ===
==== Section 1 ====
First round
1	(Hungary) T Babos (France) K Mladenovic	6	6
(Australia) A Tomljanović (China) S Zhang	1	4
(Australia) D Gavrilova (Russia) D Kasatkina	3	6^{3}
(Japan) N Hibino (Georgia (country)) O Kalashnikova	6	7^{7}
(Russia) A Blinkova (Czech Republic) L Hradecká	1	7^{7}	5
(Slovakia) V Kužmová (Slovakia) M Rybáriková	6	6^{4}	7
(United States) C McHale (China) S Peng	4	6	6^{3}
13	(United States) N Melichar (Czech Republic) K Peschke	6	2	7^{7}
11	(United States) R Atawo (Germany) A-L Grönefeld	6	2	6
PR	(Kazakhstan) Z Diyas (China) S Zheng	4	6	2
(Slovenia) P Hercog (Belgium) A Van Uytvanck	0	4
(Japan) E Hozumi (Japan) M Ninomiya	6	6
(United States) K Christian (Germany) C Witthöft	4	6	6
(Argentina) M Irigoyen (Ukraine) K Kozlova	6	3	1
WC	(France) T Andrianjafitrimo (France) F Ferro	3	1
5	(Canada) G Dabrowski (China) Y Xu	6	6

Second round
1	(Hungary) T Babos (France) K Mladenovic	6	6
(Japan) N Hibino (Georgia (country)) O Kalashnikova	1	3
(Slovakia) V Kužmová (Slovakia) M Rybáriková	1	4
13	(United States) N Melichar (Czech Republic) K Peschke	6	6
11	(United States) R Atawo (Germany) A-L Grönefeld	6	2	0
(Japan) E Hozumi (Japan) M Ninomiya	2	6	6
(United States) K Christian (Germany) C Witthöft	2	2
5	(Canada) G Dabrowski (China) Y Xu	6	6

Third round
1	(Hungary) T Babos (France) K Mladenovic	4	6	7
13	(United States) N Melichar (Czech Republic) K Peschke	6	2	5
(Japan) E Hozumi (Japan) M Ninomiya	6	6
5	(Canada) G Dabrowski (China) Y Xu	1	2

Quarterfinals
1	(Hungary) T Babos (France) K Mladenovic	6^{4}	3
(Japan) E Hozumi (Japan) M Ninomiya	7^{7}	6

==== Section 2 ====
First round
4	(Chinese Taipei) L Chan (United States) B Mattek-Sands	6	6
WC	(France) V Razzano (France) J Suvrijn	4	1
(Romania) I Bara (Romania) M Buzărnescu	6^{3}	6	6
(Switzerland) X Knoll (United Kingdom) A Smith	7^{7}	3	4
(Russia) A Kalinskaya (Russia) E Makarova	3	4
PR	(United States) J Brady (United States) V King	6	6
(Ukraine) K Bondarenko (Serbia) A Krunić	7	4	7^{7}
15	(Poland) A Rosolska (United States) A Spears	5	6	6^{2}
10	(Latvia) J Ostapenko (Russia) E Vesnina	6	3	4
(Romania) S Cîrstea (Spain) S Sorribes Tormo	1	6	6
Alt	(Switzerland) B Bencic (Czech Republic) M Vondroušová	2	4
(Russia) S Kuznetsova (Czech Republic) L Šafářová	6	6
(United Kingdom) J Konta (United States) A Riske	6	4	6^{3}
PR	(Spain) A Medina Garrigues (Spain) A Parra Santonja	3	6	7^{7}
(Chinese Taipei) S-w Hsieh (Germany) A Petkovic	4	4
8	(Chinese Taipei) H-c Chan (China) Z Yang	6	6

Second round
4	(Chinese Taipei) L Chan (United States) B Mattek-Sands	6	3	3
(Romania) I Bara (Romania) M Buzărnescu	2	6	6
PR	(United States) J Brady (United States) V King	5	6	6
(Ukraine) K Bondarenko (Serbia) A Krunić	7	3	3
(Romania) S Cîrstea (Spain) S Sorribes Tormo	6	6
(Russia) S Kuznetsova (Czech Republic) L Šafářová	3	2
PR	(Spain) A Medina Garrigues (Spain) A Parra Santonja	3	5
8	(Chinese Taipei) H-c Chan (China) Z Yang	6	7

Third round
(Romania) I Bara (Romania) M Buzărnescu	6	6
PR	(United States) J Brady (United States) V King	4	3
(Romania) S Cîrstea (Spain) S Sorribes Tormo	2	4
8	(Chinese Taipei) H-c Chan (China) Z Yang	6	6

Quarterfinals
(Romania) I Bara (Romania) M Buzărnescu	3	6	4
8	(Chinese Taipei) H-c Chan (China) Z Yang	6	1	6

=== Bottom half ===
==== Section 3 ====
First round
6	(Czech Republic) B Krejčíková (Czech Republic) K Siniaková	5	6	6
(Belarus) V Lapko (Romania) R Olaru	7	3	2
WC	(France) M Arcangioli (France) S Reix	3	4
(Germany) T Maria (United Kingdom) H Watson	6	6
(United States) T Townsend (Czech Republic) R Voráčová	6	6
WC	(France) S Cakarevic (France) J Ponchet	4	1
(Russia) V Kudermetova (Russia) A Kudryavtseva	5	2
9	(Netherlands) K Bertens (Sweden) J Larsson	7	6
14	(Japan) S Aoyama (Japan) M Kato	6	4	1
WC	(United States) S Williams (United States) V Williams	4	6	6
(Italy) S Errani (Belgium) K Flipkens	6	6
WC	(France) C Burel (France) D Parry	4	2
(Romania) I-C Begu (China) Q Wang	6	7^{7}
(Croatia) P Martić (Greece) M Sakkari	3	6^{5}
(Australia) M Adamczak (China) Y Wang	0	4
3	(Slovenia) A Klepač (Spain) MJ Martínez Sánchez	6	6

Second round
6	(Czech Republic) B Krejčíková (Czech Republic) K Siniaková	6	2	7
(Germany) T Maria (United Kingdom) H Watson	1	6	5
(United States) T Townsend (Czech Republic) R Voráčová	4	0
9	(Netherlands) K Bertens (Sweden) J Larsson	6	6
WC	(United States) S Williams (United States) V Williams	6	6
(Italy) S Errani (Belgium) K Flipkens	4	2
(Romania) I-C Begu (China) Q Wang	3	5
3	(Slovenia) A Klepač (Spain) MJ Martínez Sánchez	6	7

Third round
6	(Czech Republic) B Krejčíková (Czech Republic) K Siniaková	3	6	7^{8}
9	(Netherlands) K Bertens (Sweden) J Larsson	6	4	6^{6}
WC	(United States) S Williams (United States) V Williams	4	7^{7}	0
3	(Slovenia) A Klepač (Spain) MJ Martínez Sánchez	6	6^{4}	6

Quarterfinals
6	(Czech Republic) B Krejčíková (Czech Republic) K Siniaková	6	6
3	(Slovenia) A Klepač (Spain) MJ Martínez Sánchez	3	3

==== Section 4 ====
First round
7	(Australia) A Barty (United States) C Vandeweghe	6	4	4
(Croatia) D Jurak (Croatia) D Vekić	2	6	6
(Slovenia) D Jakupović (Russia) I Khromacheva	6	6
(United Kingdom) N Broady (Poland) M Linette	2	3
(Switzerland) V Golubic (Serbia) N Stojanović	6	6
WC	(France) A Hesse (France) P Parmentier	0	2
(Spain) L Arruabarrena (Slovenia) K Srebotnik	3	6	7^{7}
12	(Belgium) E Mertens (Netherlands) D Schuurs	6	3	6^{5}
16	(Ukraine) N Kichenok (Australia) An Rodionova	3	6	7
PR	(Luxembourg) M Minella (Latvia) A Sevastova	6	3	5
(Romania) A Bogdan (Ukraine) O Savchuk	3	6	1
(China) Y Duan (Belarus) A Sasnovich	6	3	6
(Netherlands) L Kerkhove (Belarus) L Marozava	3	4
(Russia) A Pavlyuchenkova (Australia) S Stosur	6	6
(Ukraine) L Kichenok (Ukraine) L Tsurenko	4	6	1
2	(Czech Republic) A Sestini Hlaváčková (Czech Republic) B Strýcová	6	3	6

Second round
(Croatia) D Jurak (Croatia) D Vekić	1	0
(Slovenia) D Jakupović (Russia) I Khromacheva	6	6
(Switzerland) V Golubic (Serbia) N Stojanović	4	3
(Spain) L Arruabarrena (Slovenia) K Srebotnik	6	6
16	(Ukraine) N Kichenok (Australia) An Rodionova	4	6	4
(China) Y Duan (Belarus) A Sasnovich	6	1	6
(Russia) A Pavlyuchenkova (Australia) S Stosur	6	3	4
2	(Czech Republic) A Sestini Hlaváčková (Czech Republic) B Strýcová	3	6	6

Third round
(Slovenia) D Jakupović (Russia) I Khromacheva	3	1
(Spain) L Arruabarrena (Slovenia) K Srebotnik	6	6
(China) Y Duan (Belarus) A Sasnovich	3	3
2	(Czech Republic) A Sestini Hlaváčková (Czech Republic) B Strýcová	6	6

Quarterfinals
(Spain) L Arruabarrena (Slovenia) K Srebotnik	3	1
2	(Czech Republic) A Sestini Hlaváčková (Czech Republic) B Strýcová	6	6
