= 2018 French Open – Men's singles =

Men's singles
- 2018 French Open

Final
- Champion: (Spain) Rafael Nadal
- Runner-up: (Austria) Dominic Thiem
- Score: 6–4, 6–3, 6–2

Details
- Draw: 128 (16 Q / 8 WC )
- Seeds: 32

Events
Singles	men	women		boys	girls
Doubles	men	women	mixed	boys	girls
WC Singles	men	women	quad
WC Doubles	men	women	quad
Legends	−45	45+	women
- French Open

Defending champion Rafael Nadal defeated Dominic Thiem in the final, 6–4, 6–3, 6–2 to win the men's singles tennis title at the 2018 French Open. It was his record-extending eleventh French Open title and 17th major title overall. Nadal equaled Margaret Court's all-time record of eleven singles titles won at one major, and was the first player to achieve the feat in the Open Era. He retained the world No. 1 singles ranking with the victory; Roger Federer (despite not playing the clay court season) was also in contention for the top position.

Novak Djokovic was attempting to become the first man in the Open Era to achieve a double career Grand Slam, but he lost in the quarterfinals to Marco Cecchinato. Thiem was the first Austrian to reach a major singles final since Thomas Muster at the 1995 French Open.

With Alexander Zverev as the second seed, this was the first time since the 2006 Australian Open that a player outside of the Big Four was one of the top two seeds at a major.

Cecchinato, ranked as the world No. 72 and having failed to win a main draw match in his four previous appearances, was the first unseeded men's singles semifinalist at the French Open since Gaël Monfils in 2008, the lowest-ranked man to reach the semifinals since Andriy Medvedev in 1999, and the first Italian man to reach a major singles semifinal since Corrado Barazzutti at the 1978 French Open.

== Seeds ==
All seedings per ATP rankings.

1. (Spain) Rafael Nadal (champion)
2. (Germany) Alexander Zverev (quarterfinals)
3. (Croatia) Marin Čilić (quarterfinals)
4. (Bulgaria) Grigor Dimitrov (third round)
5. (Argentina) Juan Martín del Potro (semifinals)
6. (South Africa) Kevin Anderson (fourth round)
7. (Austria) Dominic Thiem (final)
8. (Belgium) David Goffin (fourth round)
9. (United States) John Isner (fourth round)
10. (Spain) Pablo Carreño Busta (third round)
11. (Argentina) Diego Schwartzman (quarterfinals)
12. (United States) Sam Querrey (second round)
13. (Spain) Roberto Bautista Agut (third round)
14. (United States) Jack Sock (first round)
15. (France) Lucas Pouille (third round)
16. (United Kingdom) Kyle Edmund (third round)

17. (Czech Republic) Tomáš Berdych (first round)
18. (Italy) Fabio Fognini (fourth round)
19. (Japan) Kei Nishikori (fourth round)
20. (Serbia) Novak Djokovic (quarterfinals)
21. (Australia) Nick Kyrgios (withdrew)
22. (Germany) Philipp Kohlschreiber (first round)
23. (Switzerland) Stan Wawrinka (first round)
24. (Canada) Denis Shapovalov (second round)
25. (France) Adrian Mannarino (first round)
26. (Bosnia and Herzegovina) Damir Džumhur (third round)
27. (France) Richard Gasquet (third round)
28. (Spain) Feliciano López (first round)
29. (Luxembourg) Gilles Müller (first round)
30. (Spain) Fernando Verdasco (fourth round)
31. (Spain) Albert Ramos Viñolas (third round)
32. (France) Gaël Monfils (third round)

Click on the seed number of a player to go to their draw section.

== Draw ==
Key

- Q = Qualifier
- WC = Wild card
- LL = Lucky loser
- Alt = Alternate
- ITF = ITF entry
- PR = Protected ranking
- SR = Special ranking
- SE = Special exempt
- JE = Junior exempt
- JR = Junior Accelerator Programme entrant
- CO = College Accelerator Programme entrant
- NG = Next Gen Accelerator Program entrant
- w/o = Walkover
- r = Retired
- d = Defaulted

=== Finals ===
Quarterfinals
1	(Spain) Rafael Nadal	4	6	6	6
11	(Argentina) Diego Schwartzman	6	3	2	2
3	(Croatia) Marin Čilić	6^{5}	7	3	5
5	(Argentina) Juan Martín del Potro	7^{7}	5	6	7
(Italy) Marco Cecchinato	6	7^{7}	1	7^{13}
20	(Serbia) Novak Djokovic	3	6^{4}	6	6^{11}
7	(Austria) Dominic Thiem	6	6	6
2	(Germany) Alexander Zverev	4	2	1

Semifinals
1	(Spain) Rafael Nadal	6	6	6
5	(Argentina) Juan Martín del Potro	4	1	2
(Italy) Marco Cecchinato	5	6^{10}	1
7	(Austria) Dominic Thiem	7	7^{12}	6

Final
1	(Spain) Rafael Nadal	6	6	6
7	(Austria) Dominic Thiem	4	3	2

=== Top half ===
==== Section 1 ====
First round
1	(Spain) R Nadal	6	6	7^{11}
LL	(Italy) S Bolelli	4	3	6^{9}
(Portugal) J Sousa	2	3	4
(Argentina) G Pella	6	6	6
(Tunisia) M Jaziri	2	6	6	3	6
(Russia) M Youzhny	6	2	2	6	2
(Italy) A Seppi	0	2	2
27	(France) R Gasquet	6	6	6
24	(Canada) D Shapovalov	7	6	6
(Australia) J Millman	5	4	2
(United States) R Harrison	1	3	5
(Germany) M Marterer	6	6	7
(India) Y Bhambri	4	4	1
LL	(Belgium) R Bemelmans	6	6	6
LL	(Estonia) J Zopp	6^{4}	6	4	7^{7}	6
14	(United States) J Sock	7^{7}	2	6	6^{5}	3

Second round
1	(Spain) R Nadal	6	6	6
(Argentina) G Pella	2	1	1
(Tunisia) M Jaziri	2	6	3	0
27	(France) R Gasquet	6	3	6	6
24	(Canada) D Shapovalov	7	6^{4}	5	4
(Germany) M Marterer	5	7^{7}	7	6
LL	(Belgium) R Bemelmans	6	6	3	4	4
LL	(Estonia) J Zopp	4	4	6	6	6

Third round
1	(Spain) R Nadal	6	6	6
27	(France) R Gasquet	3	2	2
(Germany) M Marterer	6	6	6
LL	(Estonia) J Zopp	2	1	4

Fourth round
1	(Spain) R Nadal	6	6	7^{7}
(Germany) M Marterer	3	2	6^{4}

==== Section 2 ====
First round
11	(Argentina) D Schwartzman	6	6	6
WC	(France) C Hemery	1	3	1
(Bosnia and Herzegovina) M Bašić	7^{7}	5	2	2
Q	(Czech Republic) A Pavlásek	6^{4}	7	6	6
(Australia) M Ebden	4	7	2	6	2
(Italy) T Fabbiano	6	5	6	3	6
(Croatia) B Ćorić	6	3	6	6
22	(Germany) P Kohlschreiber	3	6	3	4
28	(Spain) F López	2	4	2
LL	(Ukraine) S Stakhovsky	6	6	6
(Germany) M Zverev	6	6	7^{7}
(Germany) F Mayer	2	1	6^{3}
(Slovenia) A Bedene	4	3	2
(Uruguay) P Cuevas	6	6	6
(Italy) P Lorenzi	1	2	4
6	(South Africa) K Anderson	6	6	6

Second round
11	(Argentina) D Schwartzman	6	6	6
Q	(Czech Republic) A Pavlásek	1	3	1
(Italy) T Fabbiano	6	2	1	1
(Croatia) B Ćorić	4	6	6	6
LL	(Ukraine) S Stakhovsky	3	7^{7}	6^{2}	1
(Germany) M Zverev	6	6^{0}	7^{7}	6
(Uruguay) P Cuevas	3	6	6^{5}	4
6	(South Africa) K Anderson	6	3	7^{7}	6

Third round
11	(Argentina) D Schwartzman	7	6	6
(Croatia) B Ćorić	5	3	3
(Germany) M Zverev	1	7^{7}	3	6^{4}
6	(South Africa) K Anderson	6	6^{3}	6	7^{7}

Fourth round
11	(Argentina) D Schwartzman	1	2	7	7^{7}	6
6	(South Africa) K Anderson	6	6	5	6^{0}	2

==== Section 3 ====
First round
3	(Croatia) M Čilić	6	7	7^{7}
PR	(Australia) J Duckworth	3	5	6^{4}
Q	(Poland) H Hurkacz	6	6	3	6
(United States) T Sandgren	2	2	6	3
(Russia) E Donskoy	1	3	0
(Germany) J-L Struff	6	6	6
(United States) S Johnson	7^{7}	6	6
25	(France) A Mannarino	6^{1}	2	2
18	(Italy) F Fognini	6	6	6
PR	(Spain) P Andújar	4	2	1
(Israel) D Sela	6^{3}	3	1
Q	(Sweden) E Ymer	7^{7}	6	6
(Canada) V Pospisil	3	3	6^{5}
(Hungary) M Fucsovics	6	6	7^{7}
WC	(Australia) A de Minaur	2	4	3
16	(United Kingdom) K Edmund	6	6	6

Second round
3	(Croatia) M Čilić	6	6	6^{3}	7
Q	(Poland) H Hurkacz	2	2	7^{7}	5
(Germany) J-L Struff	6	6^{5}	2	2
(United States) S Johnson	4	7^{7}	6	6
18	(Italy) F Fognini	6	6	6
Q	(Sweden) E Ymer	4	1	2
(Hungary) M Fucsovics	0	6	2	3
16	(United Kingdom) K Edmund	6	1	6	6

Third round
3	(Croatia) M Čilić	6	6	6
(United States) S Johnson	3	2	4
18	(Italy) F Fognini	6	4	3	6	6
16	(United Kingdom) K Edmund	3	6	6	4	4

Fourth round
3	(Croatia) M Čilić	6	6	3	6^{4}	6
18	(Italy) F Fognini	4	1	6	7^{7}	3

==== Section 4 ====
First round
9	(United States) J Isner	6	7^{9}	7^{9}
WC	(United States) N Rubin	3	6^{7}	6^{7}
(Argentina) H Zeballos	6	6^{3}	6	6
(Japan) Y Sugita	4	7^{7}	4	2
LL	(Canada) P Polansky	3	6	2	2
(France) P-H Herbert	6	4	6	6
(France) J Chardy	7^{7}	7^{10}	1	5	6
17	(Czech Republic) T Berdych	6^{5}	6^{8}	6	7	2
31	(Spain) A Ramos Viñolas	7^{7}	6	6
(Kazakhstan) M Kukushkin	6^{0}	4	1
(Australia) J Thompson	1	4	6	6	3
Q	(Norway) C Ruud	6	6	2	4	6
(Argentina) L Mayer	6	6^{4}	2	3
(France) J Benneteau	2	7^{7}	6	6
WC	(France) N Mahut	6	1	2	4
5	(Argentina) JM del Potro	1	6	6	6

Second round
9	(United States) J Isner	6^{8}	7^{7}	7^{7}	6
(Argentina) H Zeballos	7^{10}	6^{4}	6^{2}	2
(France) P-H Herbert	2	6	6	3	9
(France) J Chardy	6	3	2	6	7
31	(Spain) A Ramos Viñolas	6	6	6
Q	(Norway) C Ruud	4	2	4
(France) J Benneteau	4	3	2
5	(Argentina) JM del Potro	6	6	6

Third round
9	(United States) J Isner	7^{7}	6	7^{7}
(France) P-H Herbert	6^{1}	4	6^{4}
31	(Spain) A Ramos Viñolas	5	4	1
5	(Argentina) JM del Potro	7	6	6

Fourth round
9	(United States) J Isner	4	4	4
5	(Argentina) JM del Potro	6	6	6

=== Bottom half ===
==== Section 5 ====
First round
8	(Belgium) D Goffin	4	4	6	6	6
(Netherlands) R Haase	6	6	4	1	0
(Croatia) I Karlović	6^{7}	2	6^{5}
WC	(France) C Moutet	7^{9}	6	7^{7}
Q	(Slovakia) M Kližan	7^{8}	4	7^{8}	6
(Serbia) L Đere	6^{6}	6	6^{6}	1
WC	(France) E Benchetrit	6	1	2	1
32	(France) G Monfils	3	6	6	6
LL	(Argentina) M Trungelliti	6	5	6	6
Q	(Australia) B Tomic	4	7	4	4
(Italy) M Cecchinato	2	6^{4}	7	6	10
(Romania) M Copil	6	7^{7}	5	2	8
(Argentina) F Delbonis	6	6	3	6
Q	(Brazil) T Bellucci	1	3	6	1
Q	(Slovakia) J Kovalík	6	1	5	6^{5}
10	(Spain) P Carreño Busta	4	6	7	7^{7}

Second round
8	(Belgium) D Goffin	7	6	6
WC	(France) C Moutet	5	0	1
Q	(Slovakia) M Kližan	2	4	4
32	(France) G Monfils	6	6	6
LL	(Argentina) M Trungelliti	1	6^{1}	1
(Italy) M Cecchinato	6	7^{7}	6
(Argentina) F Delbonis	6^{0}	6^{2}	6	4
10	(Spain) P Carreño Busta	7^{7}	7^{7}	3	6

Third round
8	(Belgium) D Goffin	6^{6}	6	4	7	6
32	(France) G Monfils	7^{8}	3	6	5	3
(Italy) M Cecchinato	2	7^{7}	6	6
10	(Spain) P Carreño Busta	6	6^{5}	3	1

Fourth round
8	(Belgium) D Goffin	5	6	0	3
(Italy) M Cecchinato	7	4	6	6

==== Section 6 ====
First round
13	(Spain) R Bautista Agut	6	6^{3}	1	6	6
(Uzbekistan) D Istomin	2	7^{7}	6	4	4
(Cyprus) M Baghdatis	6	4^{r}
Q	(Colombia) S Giraldo	3	3
Q	(Spain) J Munar	3	3	7^{7}	7^{7}	7
(Spain) D Ferrer	6	6	6^{3}	6^{4}	5
Q	(Brazil) R Dutra da Silva	3	4	4
20	(Serbia) N Djokovic	6	6	6
30	(Spain) F Verdasco	6^{4}	6	6	6^{3}	7
PR	(Japan) Y Nishioka	7^{7}	4	3	7^{7}	5
Q	(Argentina) G Andreozzi	6^{4}	6	3	6	6
(United States) T Fritz	7^{7}	3	6	2	3
(Chile) N Jarry	3	6	6	3	4
(United States) J Donaldson	6	4	3	6	6
LL	(Egypt) M Safwat	1	4	6^{1}
4	(Bulgaria) G Dimitrov	6	6	7^{7}

Second round
13	(Spain) R Bautista Agut	6	7	6
Q	(Colombia) S Giraldo	4	5	3
Q	(Spain) J Munar	6^{1}	4	4
20	(Serbia) N Djokovic	7^{7}	6	6
30	(Spain) F Verdasco	6	6	6
Q	(Argentina) G Andreozzi	3	2	2
(United States) J Donaldson	7^{7}	4	6	4	8
4	(Bulgaria) G Dimitrov	6^{2}	6	4	6	10

Third round
13	(Spain) R Bautista Agut	4	7^{8}	6^{4}	2
20	(Serbia) N Djokovic	6	6^{6}	7^{7}	6
30	(Spain) F Verdasco	7^{7}	6	6
4	(Bulgaria) G Dimitrov	6^{4}	2	4

Fourth round
20	(Serbia) N Djokovic	6	6	6
30	(Spain) F Verdasco	3	4	2

==== Section 7 ====
First round
7	(Austria) D Thiem	6	6	6
Q	(Belarus) I Ivashka	2	4	1
(Greece) S Tsitsipas	7	6^{5}	6	6
Q	(Spain) C Taberner	5	7^{7}	4	3
LL	(Germany) O Otte	6	5	2	1
(Italy) M Berrettini	3	7	6	6
Q	(Latvia) E Gulbis	2	6	6	6
29	(Luxembourg) G Müller	6	4	4	3
19	(Japan) K Nishikori	7^{7}	6	6
WC	(France) M Janvier	6^{0}	4	3
(France) B Paire	6	6^{3}	7^{11}	6
(Spain) R Carballés Baena	3	7^{7}	6^{9}	1
(Georgia (country)) N Basilashvili	4	0	7^{7}	4
(France) G Simon	6	6	6^{4}	6
(United States) F Tiafoe	1	2	6^{6}
12	(United States) S Querrey	6	6	7^{8}

Second round
7	(Austria) D Thiem	6	2	6	6
(Greece) S Tsitsipas	2	6	4	4
(Italy) M Berrettini	6	3	6	6
Q	(Latvia) E Gulbis	2	6	4	3
19	(Japan) K Nishikori	6	2	4	6	6
(France) B Paire	3	6	6	2	3
(France) G Simon	1	7^{7}	6	6
12	(United States) S Querrey	6	6^{3}	4	1

Third round
7	(Austria) D Thiem	6	6^{5}	6	6
(Italy) M Berrettini	3	7^{7}	3	2
19	(Japan) K Nishikori	6	6	6
(France) G Simon	3	1	3

Fourth round
7	(Austria) D Thiem	6	6	5	6
19	(Japan) K Nishikori	2	0	7	4

==== Section 8 ====
First round
15	(France) L Pouille	6	6	6
(Russia) D Medvedev	2	3	4
(Germany) P Gojowczyk	1	0^{r}
(United Kingdom) C Norrie	6	2
(Russia) K Khachanov	7^{7}	6	6
PR	(Austria) A Haider-Maurer	6^{0}	3	3
(Spain) G García López	6	3	4	7^{7}	6
23	(Switzerland) S Wawrinka	2	6	6	6^{5}	3
26	(Bosnia and Herzegovina) D Džumhur	6	6	6
Q	(United States) D Kudla	4	2	2
WC	(France) G Barrère	6	6	5	1	2
(Moldova) R Albot	4	0	7	6	6
(Czech Republic) J Veselý	3	1	3
(Serbia) D Lajović	6	6	6
(Lithuania) R Berankis	1	1	2
2	(Germany) A Zverev	6	6	6

Second round
15	(France) L Pouille	6	6	5	7^{7}
(United Kingdom) C Norrie	2	4	7	6^{3}
(Russia) K Khachanov	6	7^{9}	6^{0}	6
(Spain) G García López	2	6^{7}	7^{7}	3
26	(Bosnia and Herzegovina) D Džumhur	6	6	5	1	7
(Moldova) R Albot	3	3	7	6	5
(Serbia) D Lajović	6	5	6	1	2
2	(Germany) A Zverev	2	7	4	6	6

Third round
15	(France) L Pouille	3	5	3
(Russia) K Khachanov	6	7	6
26	(Bosnia and Herzegovina) D Džumhur	2	6	6	6^{3}	5
2	(Germany) A Zverev	6	3	4	7^{7}	7

Fourth round
(Russia) K Khachanov	6	6^{4}	6	3	3
2	(Germany) A Zverev	4	7^{7}	2	6	6

Preceded by 2018 Australian Open – Men's singles	Grand Slam men's singles	Succeeded by 2018 Wimbledon Championships – Men's singles
