= 2018 French Open – Women's singles =

Women's singles
- 2018 French Open

Final
- Champion: (Romania) Simona Halep
- Runner-up: (United States) Sloane Stephens
- Score: 3–6, 6–4, 6–1

Details
- Draw: 128 (12Q / 8WC)
- Seeds: 32

Events
Singles	men	women		boys	girls
Doubles	men	women	mixed	boys	girls
WC Singles	men	women	quad
WC Doubles	men	women	quad
Legends	−45	45+	women
- French Open

Simona Halep defeated Sloane Stephens in the final, 3–6, 6–4, 6–1 to win the women's singles tennis title at the 2018 French Open. It was her first major title, following three previous runner-up finishes. Halep was the second Romanian woman to win a major singles title, after Virginia Ruzici at the 1978 French Open. She became the sixth woman to win both the junior and senior titles at the tournament, having won the former in 2008.

Jeļena Ostapenko was the defending champion, but was defeated in the first round by Kateryna Kozlova. This made her only the second French Open champion (after Anastasia Myskina in 2005) to lose in the first round of their title defense.

Halep retained the world No. 1 singles ranking after defeating fellow contender Garbiñe Muguruza in the semifinals. Halep, Muguruza, Caroline Wozniacki, Elina Svitolina, Karolína Plíšková and Caroline Garcia were all in contention for the top ranking.

This marked the first major singles appearance of future French Open and Wimbledon champion Barbora Krejčíková, as well as the first main-draw French Open appearance of future world No. 1 and four-time major champion Aryna Sabalenka; they both lost in the first round to Karolína Plíšková and Kiki Bertens respectively. This also was the last major appearance of 2010 champion Francesca Schiavone, who lost to Viktória Kužmová in the first round. This was the final French Open appearance of former world No. 1 and two-time champion Maria Sharapova; she lost to Muguruza in the quarterfinals.

This tournament marked the first time that Agnieszka Radwańska did not play in the main draw of a singles major since her debut at the 2006 Wimbledon Championships, ending a streak of 47 consecutive appearances.

This was Serena Williams' first major appearance since the 2017 Australian Open due to her maternity leave. She was unseeded in a singles major for the first time since the 2007 Australian Open. Williams reached the fourth round before withdrawing due to a pectoral muscle injury, ending her streak of ten consecutive major semifinals dating back to the 2014 US Open.

== Seeds ==
1. (Romania) Simona Halep (champion)
2. (Denmark) Caroline Wozniacki (fourth round)
3. (Spain) Garbiñe Muguruza (semifinals)
4. (Ukraine) Elina Svitolina (third round)
5. (Latvia) Jeļena Ostapenko (first round)
6. (Czech Republic) Karolína Plíšková (third round)
7. (France) Caroline Garcia (fourth round)
8. (Czech Republic) Petra Kvitová (third round)
9. (United States) Venus Williams (first round)
10. (United States) Sloane Stephens (final)
11. (Germany) Julia Görges (third round)
12. (Germany) Angelique Kerber (quarterfinals)
13. (United States) Madison Keys (semifinals)
14. (Russia) Daria Kasatkina (quarterfinals)
15. (United States) CoCo Vandeweghe (second round)
16. (Belgium) Elise Mertens (fourth round)

17. (Australia) Ashleigh Barty (second round)
18. (Netherlands) Kiki Bertens (third round)
19. (Slovakia) Magdaléna Rybáriková (third round)
20. (Latvia) Anastasija Sevastova (first round)
21. (Japan) Naomi Osaka (third round)
22. (United Kingdom) Johanna Konta (first round)
23. (Spain) Carla Suárez Navarro (second round)
24. (Australia) Daria Gavrilova (third round)
25. (Estonia) Anett Kontaveit (fourth round)
26. (Czech Republic) Barbora Strýcová (fourth round)
27. (China) Zhang Shuai (second round)
28. (Russia) Maria Sharapova (quarterfinals)
29. (France) Kristina Mladenovic (first round)
30. (Russia) Anastasia Pavlyuchenkova (second round)
31. (Romania) Mihaela Buzărnescu (fourth round)
32. (France) Alizé Cornet (second round)

Click on the seed number of a player to go to their draw section.

== Draw ==
Key

- Q = Qualifier
- WC = Wild card
- LL = Lucky loser
- Alt = Alternate
- ITF = ITF entry
- PR = Protected ranking
- SR = Special ranking
- SE = Special exempt
- JE = Junior exempt
- JR = Junior Accelerator Programme entrant
- CO = College Accelerator Programme entrant
- NG = Next Gen Accelerator Program entrant
- w/o = Walkover
- r = Retired
- d = Defaulted

=== Finals ===
Quarterfinals
1	(Romania) Simona Halep	6^{2}	6	6
12	(Germany) Angelique Kerber	7^{7}	3	2
3	(Spain) Garbiñe Muguruza	6	6
28	(Russia) Maria Sharapova	2	1
(Kazakhstan) Yulia Putintseva	6^{5}	4
13	(United States) Madison Keys	7^{7}	6
10	(United States) Sloane Stephens	6	6
14	(Russia) Daria Kasatkina	3	1

Semifinals
1	(Romania) Simona Halep	6	6
3	(Spain) Garbiñe Muguruza	1	4
13	(United States) Madison Keys	4	4
10	(United States) Sloane Stephens	6	6

Final
1	(Romania) Simona Halep	3	6	6
10	(United States) Sloane Stephens	6	4	1

=== Top half ===
==== Section 1 ====
First round
1	(Romania) S Halep	2	6	6
(United States) A Riske	6	1	1
WC	(France) M Georges	4	2
WC	(United States) T Townsend	6	6
PR	(United States) B Mattek-Sands	6	6
(Sweden) J Larsson	4	3
(Germany) A Petkovic	7^{12}	6
29	(France) K Mladenovic	6^{10}	2
24	(Australia) D Gavrilova	4	7^{7}	6
(Romania) S Cîrstea	6	6^{4}	3
(United States) B Pera	6	6
(Russia) E Vesnina	3	2
(United Kingdom) H Watson	6	6
(France) O Dodin	3	0
(United States) V Lepchenko	7^{11}	6^{4}	0
16	(Belgium) E Mertens	6^{9}	7^{7}	6

Second round
1	(Romania) S Halep	6	6
WC	(United States) T Townsend	3	1
PR	(United States) B Mattek-Sands	0	6^{5}
(Germany) A Petkovic	6	7^{7}
24	(Australia) D Gavrilova	5	7	6
(United States) B Pera	7	5	3
(United Kingdom) H Watson	3	4
16	(Belgium) E Mertens	6	6

Third round
1	(Romania) S Halep	7	6
(Germany) A Petkovic	5	0
24	(Australia) D Gavrilova	3	1
16	(Belgium) E Mertens	6	6

Fourth round
1	(Romania) S Halep	6	6
16	(Belgium) E Mertens	2	1

==== Section 2 ====
First round
12	(Germany) A Kerber	6	6
(Germany) M Barthel	2	3
(Romania) A Bogdan	6	1	6
(Czech Republic) M Vondroušová	3	6	4
(Belarus) A Sasnovich	6	6
(Czech Republic) D Allertová	4	3
(Belarus) A Sabalenka	2	1
18	(Netherlands) K Bertens	6	6
27	(China) S Zhang	6	7
PR	(Slovakia) K Kučová	0	5
(Romania) I-C Begu	6	5	9
(Slovakia) AK Schmiedlová	4	7	7
(China) S Peng	6	6
(Serbia) A Krunić	3	4
(China) Y Duan	1	0
7	(France) C Garcia	6	6

Second round
12	(Germany) A Kerber	6	6
(Romania) A Bogdan	2	3
(Belarus) A Sasnovich	4	2
18	(Netherlands) K Bertens	6	6
27	(China) S Zhang	3	4
(Romania) I-C Begu	6	6
(China) S Peng	4	6	3
7	(France) C Garcia	6	3	6

Third round
12	(Germany) A Kerber	7^{7}	7^{7}
18	(Netherlands) K Bertens	6^{4}	6^{4}
(Romania) I-C Begu	1	3
7	(France) C Garcia	6	6

Fourth round
12	(Germany) A Kerber	6	6
7	(France) C Garcia	2	3

==== Section 3 ====
First round
3	(Spain) G Muguruza	7^{7}	6
(Russia) S Kuznetsova	6^{0}	2
WC	(France) F Ferro	6	6
(Germany) C Witthöft	4	2
(Australia) S Stosur	6	6
(Belgium) Y Wickmayer	2	4
(Slovenia) P Hercog	4	6^{1}
30	(Russia) A Pavlyuchenkova	6	7^{7}
19	(Slovakia) M Rybáriková	6	6
(Thailand) L Kumkhum	3	0
(Switzerland) B Bencic	3	7^{7}	7
Q	(Italy) D Chiesa	6	6^{2}	5
(Ukraine) L Tsurenko	4	6	6
(Switzerland) S Vögele	6	2	2
(Germany) L Siegemund	4	4
15	(United States) C Vandeweghe	6	6

Second round
3	(Spain) G Muguruza	6	6
WC	(France) F Ferro	4	3
(Australia) S Stosur	6	7^{7}
30	(Russia) A Pavlyuchenkova	2	6^{1}
19	(Slovakia) M Rybáriková	6	6
(Switzerland) B Bencic	2	4
(Ukraine) L Tsurenko	3	6	6
15	(United States) C Vandeweghe	6	4	0

Third round
3	(Spain) G Muguruza	6	6
(Australia) S Stosur	0	2
19	(Slovakia) M Rybáriková	2	4
(Ukraine) L Tsurenko	6	6

Fourth round
3	(Spain) G Muguruza	2
(Ukraine) L Tsurenko	0^{r}

==== Section 4 ====
First round
11	(Germany) J Görges	6	5	6
(Slovakia) D Cibulková	4	7	0
(Belgium) A Van Uytvanck	6	6
WC	(Australia) I Wallace	1	0
(Czech Republic) Kr Plíšková	6^{4}	4
PR	(United States) S Williams	7^{7}	6
(Russia) N Vikhlyantseva	3	1
17	(Australia) A Barty	6	6
28	(Russia) M Sharapova	6	4	6
Q	(Netherlands) R Hogenkamp	1	6	3
(Ukraine) K Bondarenko	2	4
(Croatia) D Vekić	6	6
(Czech Republic) L Šafářová	6	6
WC	(France) J Ponchet	4	1
Q	(Czech Republic) B Krejčíková	6^{6}	4
6	(Czech Republic) Ka Plíšková	7^{8}	6

Second round
11	(Germany) J Görges	7	7^{7}
(Belgium) A Van Uytvanck	5	6^{5}
PR	(United States) S Williams	3	6	6
17	(Australia) A Barty	6	3	4
28	(Russia) M Sharapova	7	6
(Croatia) D Vekić	5	4
(Czech Republic) L Šafářová	6	4	1
6	(Czech Republic) Ka Plíšková	3	6	6

Third round
11	(Germany) J Görges	3	4
PR	(United States) S Williams	6	6
28	(Russia) M Sharapova	6	6
6	(Czech Republic) Ka Plíšková	2	1

Fourth round
PR	(United States) S Williams
28	(Russia) M Sharapova	w/o

=== Bottom half ===
==== Section 5 ====
First round
5	(Latvia) J Ostapenko	5	3
(Ukraine) K Kozlova	7	6
(Czech Republic) K Siniaková	7	7
PR	(Belarus) V Azarenka	5	5
PR	(China) S Zheng	4	1
(Russia) E Makarova	6	6
(Japan) K Nara	6	3	4
26	(Czech Republic) B Strýcová	1	6	6
22	(United Kingdom) J Konta	4	3
(Kazakhstan) Y Putintseva	6	6
(United States) J Brady	6	6
WC	(France) A Hesse	1	1
(Croatia) P Martić	6	6
(China) Y Wang	2	3
(China) Q Wang	6	7
9	(United States) V Williams	4	5

Second round
(Ukraine) K Kozlova	7^{7}	4	4
(Czech Republic) K Siniaková	6^{4}	6	6
(Russia) E Makarova	4	2
26	(Czech Republic) B Strýcová	6	6
(Kazakhstan) Y Putintseva	6	6
(United States) J Brady	4	3
(Croatia) P Martić	1	1
(China) Q Wang	6	6

Third round
(Czech Republic) K Siniaková	2	3
26	(Czech Republic) B Strýcová	6	6
(Kazakhstan) Y Putintseva	1	7	6
(China) Q Wang	6	5	4

Fourth round
26	(Czech Republic) B Strýcová	4	3
(Kazakhstan) Y Putintseva	6	6

==== Section 6 ====
First round
13	(United States) M Keys	6	6
(United States) S Vickery	3	3
Q	(United States) C Dolehide	6	6
Q	(Switzerland) V Golubic	4	4
(Poland) M Linette	3	1
(Kazakhstan) Z Diyas	6	6
(United States) S Kenin	2	5
21	(Japan) N Osaka	6	7
31	(Romania) M Buzărnescu	6	6
PR	(United States) V King	3	3
Q	(Sweden) R Peterson	6	6
(Chinese Taipei) S-w Hsieh	4	3
Q	(Italy) F Schiavone	6^{2}	6^{2}
(Slovakia) V Kužmová	7^{7}	7^{7}
(Australia) A Tomljanović	5	3
4	(Ukraine) E Svitolina	7	6

Second round
13	(United States) M Keys	6	6
Q	(United States) C Dolehide	4	1
(Kazakhstan) Z Diyas	4	5
21	(Japan) N Osaka	6	7
31	(Romania) M Buzărnescu	6	6
Q	(Sweden) R Peterson	1	2
(Slovakia) V Kužmová	3	4
4	(Ukraine) E Svitolina	6	6

Third round
13	(United States) M Keys	6	7^{9}
21	(Japan) N Osaka	1	6^{7}
31	(Romania) M Buzărnescu	6	7
4	(Ukraine) E Svitolina	3	5

Fourth round
13	(United States) M Keys	6	6
31	(Romania) M Buzărnescu	1	4

==== Section 7 ====
First round
8	(Czech Republic) P Kvitová	3	6	7
(Paraguay) V Cepede Royg	6	1	5
(Spain) L Arruabarrena	7^{7}	6
(Hungary) T Babos	6^{5}	3
Q	(Romania) A Dulgheru	5	7^{7}	6
(United States) C McHale	7	6^{5}	3
(United States) M Brengle	1	6	2
25	(Estonia) A Kontaveit	6	4	6
20	(Latvia) A Sevastova	6	1	3
Q	(Colombia) M Duque Mariño	4	6	6
(Italy) C Giorgi	6	6
Q	(United States) G Min	3	2
Q	(Poland) M Fręch	6	3	6
(Russia) E Alexandrova	3	6	3
LL	(Netherlands) A Rus	2	0
10	(United States) S Stephens	6	6

Second round
8	(Czech Republic) P Kvitová	6	6
(Spain) L Arruabarrena	0	4
Q	(Romania) A Dulgheru	5	2
25	(Estonia) A Kontaveit	7	6
Q	(Colombia) M Duque Mariño	0	3
(Italy) C Giorgi	6	6
Q	(Poland) M Fręch	2	2
10	(United States) S Stephens	6	6

Third round
8	(Czech Republic) P Kvitová	6^{6}	6^{4}
25	(Estonia) A Kontaveit	7^{8}	7^{7}
(Italy) C Giorgi	6	1	6
10	(United States) S Stephens	4	6	8

Fourth round
25	(Estonia) A Kontaveit	2	0
10	(United States) S Stephens	6	6

==== Section 8 ====
First round
14	(Russia) D Kasatkina	6	6
(Estonia) K Kanepi	4	1
(Germany) T Maria	6^{1}	4
(Belgium) K Flipkens	7^{7}	6
PR	(Luxembourg) M Minella	6^{5}	2
(Greece) M Sakkari	7^{7}	6
(Croatia) A Konjuh	0	1
23	(Spain) C Suárez Navarro	6	6
32	(France) A Cornet	2	6	6
(Italy) S Errani	6	2	3
WC	(France) C Paquet	6	6^{4}	2
WC	(France) P Parmentier	3	7^{7}	6
LL	(Slovenia) D Jakupović	3	4
Q	(Spain) G García Pérez	6	6
(United States) D Collins	6^{2}	1
2	(Denmark) C Wozniacki	7^{7}	6

Second round
14	(Russia) D Kasatkina	6	6
(Belgium) K Flipkens	3	3
(Greece) M Sakkari	7	6
23	(Spain) C Suárez Navarro	5	3
32	(France) A Cornet	7^{7}	4	2
WC	(France) P Parmentier	6^{2}	6	6
Q	(Spain) G García Pérez	1	0
2	(Denmark) C Wozniacki	6	6

Third round
14	(Russia) D Kasatkina	6	1	6
(Greece) M Sakkari	1	6	3
WC	(France) P Parmentier	0	3
2	(Denmark) C Wozniacki	6	6

Fourth round
14	(Russia) D Kasatkina	7^{7}	6
2	(Denmark) C Wozniacki	6^{5}	3

== Championship match statistics ==
Category	(Romania) Halep	(United States) Stephens
1st serve %	60/79 (76%)	61/81 (75%)
1st serve points won	37 of 60 = 62%	34 of 61 = 56%
2nd serve points won	10 of 19 = 53%	9 of 20 = 45%
Total service points won	47 of 79 = 59.49%	43 of 81 = 53.09%
Aces	1	1
Double faults	0	1
Winners	18	16
Unforced errors	26	39
Net points won	8 of 10 = 80%	3 of 6 = 50%
Break points converted	5 of 6 = 83%	3 of 6 = 50%
Return points won	38 of 81 = 47%	32 of 79 = 41%
Total points won	85	75

Preceded by 2018 Australian Open – Women's singles	Grand Slam women's singles	Succeeded by 2018 Wimbledon Championships – Women's singles
