= Carina Witthöft =

German tennis player

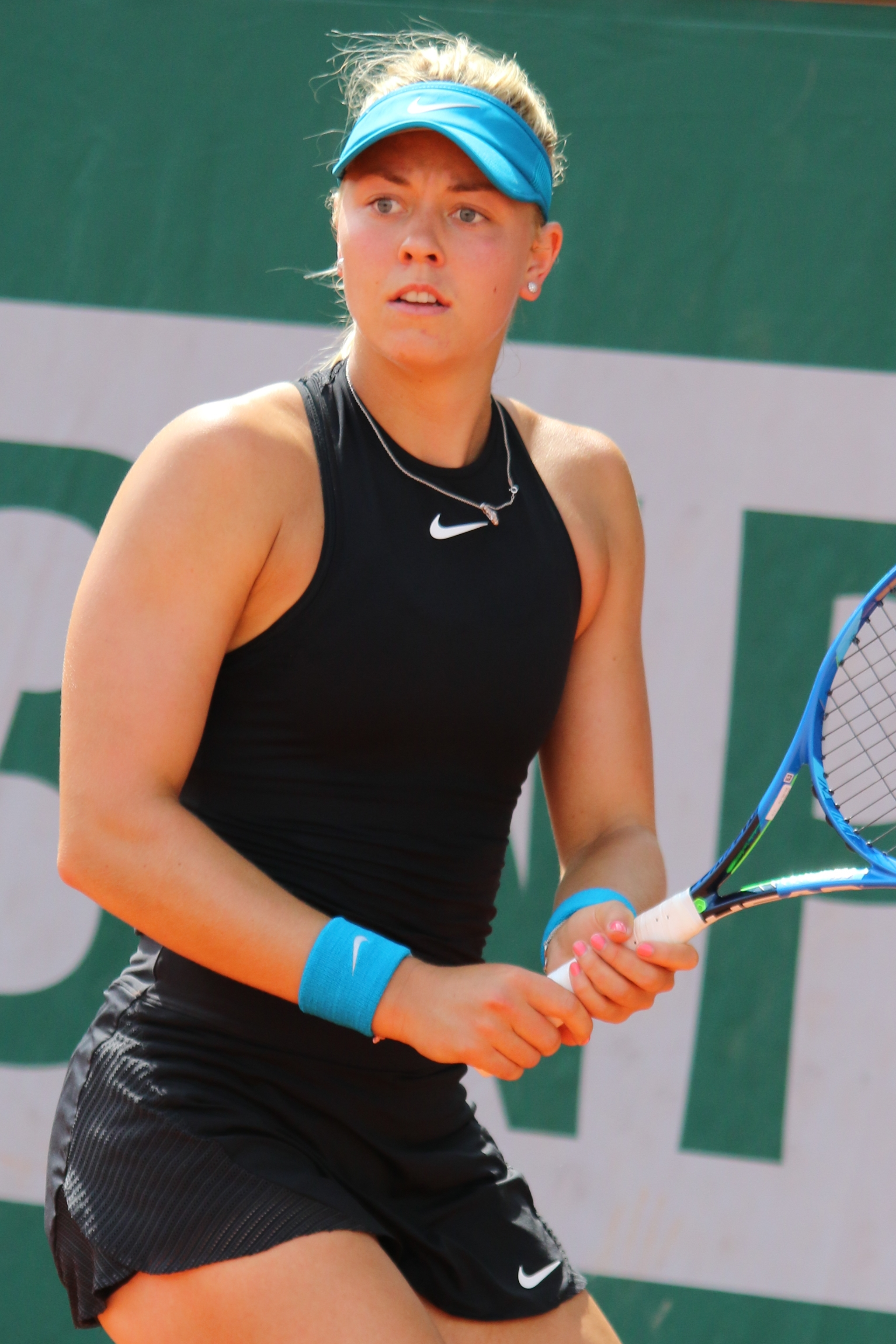
- Witthöft at the 2018 French Open
- ITF name: Carina Witthoeft
- Country (sports): Germany
- Born: 16 February 1995 (age 31) Wentorf bei Hamburg, Germany
- Height: 1.77 m (5 ft 10 in)
- Retired: 2019
- Plays: Right-handed (two-handed backhand)
- Prize money: US$1,967,633

Singles
- Career record: 271–183
- Career titles: 1 WTA, 11 ITF
- Highest ranking: No. 48 (8 January 2018)

Grand Slam singles results
- Australian Open: 3R (2015)
- French Open: 3R (2017)
- Wimbledon: 3R (2016, 2017)
- US Open: 3R (2016)

Doubles
- Career record: 17–47
- Career titles: 1 ITF
- Highest ranking: No. 168 (16 July 2018)

Grand Slam doubles results
- Australian Open: 2R (2018)
- French Open: 2R (2018)
- Wimbledon: 1R (2015, 2017, 2018)
- US Open: 2R (2017)

Team competitions
- Fed Cup: 1R (2017)

Carina Witthöft (also spelled Witthoeft; born 16 February 1995) is a German former professional tennis player. She won one singles title on the WTA Tour whereas on the ITF Women's Circuit, she won eleven singles titles and one doubles title. On 8 January 2018, she reached her career-high singles ranking of world No. 48.

== Career ==
Witthöft made her WTA Tour debut at the 2012 Swedish Open. Having defeated Marina Shamayko, Akgul Amanmuradova and Jill Craybas to qualify, she lost in the first round of the main draw against Kateryna Bondarenko.

She won her first WTA title at the 2017 Luxembourg Open, defeating Monica Puig in straight sets in the final.

She was coached by Torben Beltz and then by Philip Lang.

=== 2018 ===
Witthöft started the season at the Brisbane International where she lost in the first round to Aleksandra Krunić. Despite being defeated in the final round of qualifying at the Sydney International by Camila Giorgi, Witthöft entered the main draw as a lucky loser. She lost in the first round to Australian wildcard Sam Stosur. At the Australian Open, Witthöft was defeated in the first round by eighth seed Caroline Garcia.

In Doha at the Qatar Open, she lost in the second round to top seed Caroline Wozniacki.

=== 2019 ===
Witthöft played her last professional match at the Australian Open qualifying, where she lost in the first round.

== Singles performance timeline ==
Key
| W | F | SF | QF | #R | RR | Q# | DNQ | A | NH |

(W) winner; (F) finalist; (SF) semifinalist; (QF) quarterfinalist; (#R) rounds 4, 3, 2, 1; (RR) round-robin stage; (Q#) qualification round; (DNQ) did not qualify; (A) absent; (NH) not held; (SR) strike rate (events won / competed); (W–L) win–loss record.
To avoid confusion and double counting, these charts are updated at the conclusion of a tournament or when the player's participation has ended.

| Tournament | 2011 | 2012 | 2013 | 2014 | 2015 | 2016 | 2017 | 2018 | 2019 | SR | W–L |
|---|---|---|---|---|---|---|---|---|---|---|---|
Grand Slam tournaments
| Australian Open | A | A | A | 1R | 3R | 1R | 2R | 1R | Q1 | 0 / 5 | 3–5 |
| French Open | A | A | Q2 | Q3 | 2R | 1R | 3R | 1R | A | 0 / 4 | 3–4 |
| Wimbledon | A | A | 1R | Q2 | 1R | 3R | 3R | 1R | A | 0 / 5 | 4–5 |
| US Open | A | A | Q1 | Q3 | 1R | 3R | 1R | 2R | A | 0 / 4 | 3–4 |
| Win–loss | 0–0 | 0–0 | 0–1 | 0–1 | 3–4 | 4–4 | 5–4 | 1–4 | 0–0 | 0 / 18 | 13–18 |
Premier Mandatory tournaments
| Indian Wells Open | A | A | A | A | A | 2R | Q1 | 1R | A | 0 / 2 | 1–2 |
| Miami Open | Q1 | A | A | A | Q1 | 2R | 2R | 3R | A | 0 / 3 | 4–3 |
| China Open | A | A | A | A | 1R | A | 1R | A | A | 0 / 2 | 0–2 |
Premier 5 tournaments
| Qatar Open | NTI | A | A | A | NTI | A | NTI | 2R | NTI | 0 / 1 | 1–1 |
| Canadian Open | A | A | A | A | 3R | A | A | A | A | 0 / 1 | 2–1 |
| Cincinnati Open | A | A | A | A | Q1 | Q1 | Q2 | A | A | 0 / 0 | 0–0 |
| Wuhan Open | not held | | | A | A | A | Q2 | A | A | 0 / 0 | 0–0 |
Career statistics
| Tournaments | 0 | 1 | 2 | 1 | 18 | 15 | 15 | 18 | 0 | 70 | |
| Titles / Finals | 0 / 0 | 0 / 0 | 0 / 0 | 0 / 0 | 0 / 0 | 0 / 0 | 1 / 1 | 0 / 0 | 0 / 0 | 1 / 1 | |
| Hard win–loss | 0–0 | 0–0 | 0–0 | 0–1 | 7–9 | 6–8 | 12–7 | 4–9 | 0–0 | 29–34 | |
| Clay win–loss | 0–0 | 0–1 | 0–1 | 0–0 | 5–7 | 2–5 | 6–5 | 0–6 | 0–0 | 13–25 | |
| Grass win–loss | 0–0 | 0–0 | 0–1 | 0–0 | 0–2 | 2–2 | 4–2 | 1–3 | 0–0 | 7–10 | |
| Overall win–loss | 0–0 | 0–1 | 0–2 | 0–1 | 12–18 | 10–15 | 22–14 | 5–18 | 0–0 | 49–69 | |
| Year-end ranking | 405 | 223 | 210 | 104 | 65 | 86 | 51 | 172 | – | 42% | |

== WTA career finals ==
=== Singles: 1 (1 title) ===
| Legend Grand Slam tournaments Premier M & Premier 5 Premier International (1–0) | Finals by surface Hard (1–0) Clay (0–0) Grass (0–0) Carpet (0–0) |

| Result | W–L | Date | Tournament | Tier | Surface | Opponent | Score |
|---|---|---|---|---|---|---|---|
| Win | 1–0 | Oct 2017 | Luxembourg Open | International | Hard (i) | (Puerto Rico) Monica Puig | 6–3, 7–5 |

== ITF Circuit finals ==
=== Singles: 20 (11 titles, 9 runner–ups) ===
| Legend $100,000 tournaments (1–1) $75,000 tournaments (0–1) $50,000 tournaments (3–0) $25,000 tournaments (6–5) $10,000 tournaments (1–2) | Finals by surface Hard (3–2) Clay (7–7) Grass (0–0) Carpet (1–0) |

| Result | W–L | Date | Tournament | Tier | Surface | Opponent | Score |
|---|---|---|---|---|---|---|---|
| Win | 1–0 | Apr 2011 | ITF Zell am Harmersbach, Germany | 10,000 | Clay | (Germany) Vanessa Henke | 4–6, 6–3, 6–4 |
| Loss | 1–1 | Jul 2011 | ITF Horb, Germany | 10,000 | Clay | (Poland) Paula Kania | 6–4, 4–6, 5–7 |
| Win | 2–1 | Jun 2012 | ITF Ystad, Sweden | 25,000 | Clay | (Russia) Valeria Solovyeva | 6–2, 6–1 |
| Win | 3–1 | Jul 2012 | ITF Wrexham, United Kingdom | 25,000 | Hard | (Croatia) Donna Vekić | 6–2, 6–7^{(4–7)}, 6–2 |
| Loss | 3–2 | Aug 2012 | ITF Bad Saulgau, Germany | 25,000 | Clay | (Bosnia and Herzegovina) Mervana Jugić-Salkić | 2–6, 4–6 |
| Loss | 3–3 | Mar 2013 | ITF Sutton, United Kingdom | 10,000 | Hard (i) | (Liechtenstein) Stephanie Vogt | 6–3, 4–6, 3–6 |
| Win | 4–3 | Aug 2013 | ITF Hechingen, Germany | 25,000 | Clay | (France) Laura Thorpe | 6–1, 6–4 |
| Loss | 4–4 | Sep 2013 | ITF Alphen a/d Rijn, Netherlands | 25,000 | Clay | (Netherlands) Arantxa Rus | 6–4, 2–6, 2–6 |
| Loss | 4–5 | Jun 2014 | ITF Stuttgart, Germany | 25,000 | Clay | (Colombia) Mariana Duque | 7–5, 2–6, 2–6 |
| Loss | 4–6 | Jul 2014 | ITF Aschaffenburg, Germany | 25,000 | Clay | (Netherlands) Lesley Kerkhove | 5–7, 3–6 |
| Win | 5–6 | Aug 2014 | ITF Hechingen, Germany (2) | 25,000 | Clay | (Germany) Laura Siegemund | 4–6, 6–4, 6–3 |
| Win | 6–6 | Sep 2014 | ITF Barnstaple, United Kingdom | 25,000 | Hard (i) | (Switzerland) Viktorija Golubic | 6–2, 6–4 |
| Win | 7–6 | Sep 2014 | ITF Saint-Malo, France | 50,000 | Clay | (Italy) Alberta Brianti | 6–0, 6–1 |
| Loss | 7–7 | Sep 2014 | ITF Shrewsbury, United Kingdom | 25,000 | Hard (i) | (France) Océane Dodin | 4–6, 3–6 |
| Win | 8–7 | Oct 2014 | ITF Joué-lès-Tours, France | 50,000 | Hard (i) | (Poland) Urszula Radwańska | 6–3, 7–6^{(8–6)} |
| Win | 9–7 | Feb 2015 | ITF Altenkirchen, Germany | 25,000 | Carpet (i) | (Germany) Antonia Lottner | 6–3, 6–4 |
| Win | 10–7 | May 2015 | ITF Cagnes-sur-Mer, France | 100,000 | Clay | (Germany) Tatjana Maria | 7–5, 6–1 |
| Win | 11–7 | Jul 2015 | ITF Versmold, Germany | 50,000 | Clay | (Sweden) Johanna Larsson | 6–3, 6–3 |
| Loss | 11–8 | May 2016 | ITF Cagnes-sur-Mer, France | 100,000 | Clay | (Poland) Magda Linette | 3–6, 5–7 |
| Loss | 11–9 | Jul 2016 | ITF Prague, Czech Republic | 75,000 | Clay | (Germany) Antonia Lottner | 6–7^{(6–8)}, 6–1, 5–7 |

=== Doubles: 1 (1 title) ===
| Result | W–L | Date | Tournament | Tier | Surface | Partner | Opponents | Score |
|---|---|---|---|---|---|---|---|---|
| Win | 1–0 | Sep 2014 | ITF Barnstaple, United Kingdom | 25,000 | Hard (i) | (France) Alizé Lim | (Switzerland) Viktorija Golubic (Latvia) Diāna Marcinkēviča | 6–2, 6–1 |

== Record against top 10 players ==
Witthöft's match record against players who have been ranked in the top 10.

- (Germany) Julia Görges 2–0
- (United States) CoCo Vandeweghe 2–0
- (Netherlands) Kiki Bertens 2–2
- (Switzerland) Belinda Bencic 1–0
- (Tunisia) Ons Jabeur 1–0
- (Latvia) Jeļena Ostapenko 1–0
- (Belarus) Aryna Sabalenka 1–0
- (Italy) Francesca Schiavone 1–0
- (Czech Republic) Nicole Vaidišová 1–0
- (Japan) Kimiko Date 1–1
- (Spain) Carla Suárez Navarro 1–1
- (Czech Republic) Karolína Muchová 1–1
- (Switzerland) Timea Bacsinszky 0–1
- (Canada) Eugenie Bouchard 0–1
- (Slovakia) Dominika Cibulková 0–1
- (Italy) Sara Errani 0–1
- (Brazil) Beatriz Haddad Maia 0–1
- (Serbia) Ana Ivanovic 0–1
- (Serbia) Jelena Janković 0–1
- (Czech Republic) Barbora Krejčíková 0–1
- (Germany) Andrea Petkovic 0–1
- (Czech Republic) Karolína Plíšková 0–1
- (Poland) Agnieszka Radwańska 0–1
- (Czech Republic) Lucie Šafářová 0–1
- (United States) Sloane Stephens 0–1
- (Australia) Samantha Stosur 0–1
- (Ukraine) Elina Svitolina 0–1
- (Italy) Roberta Vinci 0–1
- (United States) Serena Williams 0–1
- (Russia) Svetlana Kuznetsova 0–2
- (Spain) Garbiñe Muguruza 0–2
- (Czech Republic) Markéta Vondroušová 0–2
- (Denmark) Caroline Wozniacki 0–2
- (France) Caroline Garcia 0–3
- (Germany) Angelique Kerber 0–3
- (Estonia) Anett Kontaveit 0–3

* As of 9 October 2023
