= Jade Suvrijn =

French tennis player

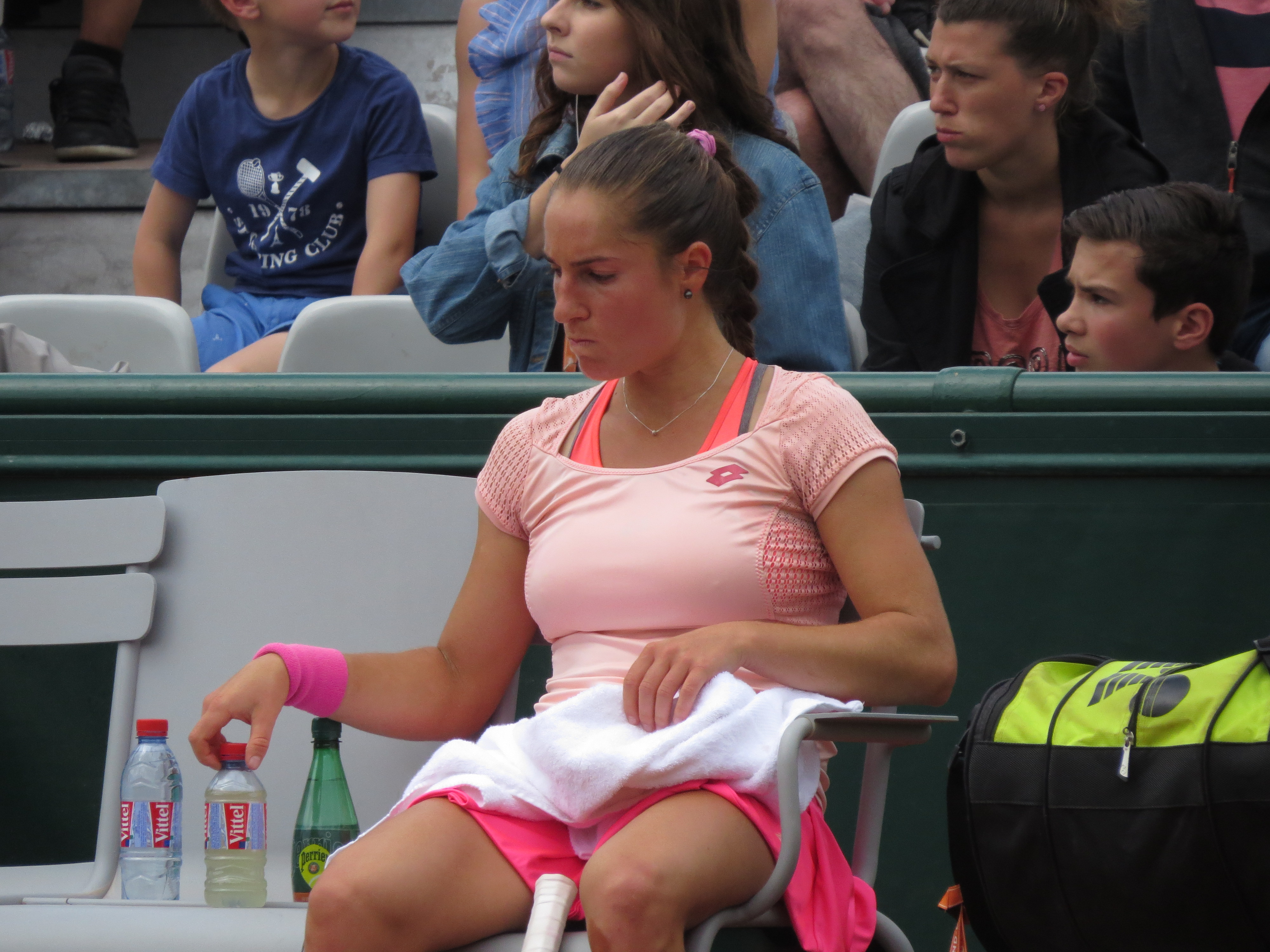
- Suvrijn at Roland Garros, 2017
- Country (sports): France
- Residence: Montpellier, France
- Born: 27 April 1995 (age 31) Kerkrade, Netherlands
- Plays: Right (two-handed backhand)
- Prize money: $84,484

Singles
- Career record: 248–175
- Career titles: 0 WTA, 5 ITF
- Highest ranking: No. 345 (23 June 2014)

Grand Slam singles results
- French Open: Q1 (2014, 2017)

Doubles
- Career record: 35–52
- Career titles: 1 ITF
- Highest ranking: No. 551 (25 June 2018)

Grand Slam doubles results
- French Open: 1R (2018)

Jade Suvrijn (born 27 April 1995) is a French former tennis player.

On 23 June 2014, she achieved a career-high singles ranking of world No. 345. On 25 June 2018, she peaked at No. 551 in the doubles rankings. Suvrijn won five singles titles and one doubles title on the ITF Circuit.

She made her Grand Slam debut at the 2018 French Open, having received a wildcard into the women's doubles tournament, partnering with Virginie Razzano.

== Personal ==
Jade Suvrijn is the daughter of Dutch retired footballer Wilbert Suvrijn and his French wife.

== ITF Circuit finals ==
=== Singles: 17 (5 titles, 12 runner-ups) ===
Legend $15,000 tournaments $10,000 tournaments	Finals by surface Clay (5–12)

Result	W–L	Date	Tournament	Tier	Surface	Opponent	Score
Loss	0–1	Sep 2012	ITF Madrid, Spain	10,000	Clay	(Bulgaria) Aleksandrina Naydenova	0–6, 4–6
Loss	0–2	Aug 2013	ITF Locri, Italy	10,000	Clay	(Italy) Jasmine Paolini	1–6, 5–7
Win	1–2	Sep 2013	ITF Pula, Italia	10,000	Clay	(Germany) Laura Schaeder	6–3, 3–6, 6–3
Loss	1–3	Nov 2013	ITF Benicarló, Spain	10,000	Clay	(Venezuela) Andrea Gamiz	2–6, 0–6
Win	2–3	Nov 2013	ITF Ouida, Morocco	10,000	Clay	(Madagascar) Zarah Razafimahatratra	4–6, 6–4, 6–3
Win	3–3	Nov 2013	ITF Fes, Morocco	10,000	Clay	(Austria) Pia König	6–4, 4–6, 6–0
Win	4–3	Nov 2013	ITF Fes, Morocco	10,000	Clay	(Madagascar) Zarah Razafimahatratra	7–5, 6–0
Loss	4–4	Apr 2014	ITF Pula, Italia	10,000	Clay	(Latvia) Jeļena Ostapenko	6–7^{(4)}, 1–6
Loss	4–5	May 2016	ITF Hammamet, Tunisia	10,000	Clay	(Serbia) Natalija Kostic	2–6, 6–4, 5–7
Loss	4–6	Jun 2016	ITF Hammamet, Tunisia	10,000	Clay	(Serbia) Natalija Kostic	1–6, 0–6
Loss	4–7	Aug 2016	ITF Nürnberg, Germany	10,000	Clay	(Germany) Katharina Hobgarski	6–2, 0–6, 2–6
Loss	4–8	Oct 2016	ITF Hammamet, Tunisia	10,000	Clay	(Tunisia) Chiraz Bechri	0–4 ret.
Loss	4–9	Mar 2017	ITF Hammamet, Tunisia	15,000	Clay	(Venezuela) Andrea Gamiz	1–6, 3–6
Loss	4–10	Aug 2017	ITF Mragowo, Poland	15,000	Clay	(Poland) Marta Leśniak	7–5, 2–6, 2–6
Loss	4–11	Dec 2017	ITF Hammamet, Tunisia	15,000	Clay	(Italy) Alice Ramé	2–6, 4–6
Loss	4–12	May 2018	ITF Hammamet, Tunisia	15,000	Clay	(Italy) Angelica Moratelli	5–7, 5–7
Win	5–12	Sep 2019	ITF Dijon, France	15,000	Clay	(Sweden) Marina Yudanov	7–6^{(13)}, 6–2

=== Doubles: 3 (1 title, 2 runner-ups) ===
Legend $25,000 tournaments $15,000 tournaments	Finals by surface Clay (1–2)

Result	Date	Tournament	Tier	Surface	Partner	Opponents	Score
Loss	Aug 2017	ITF Mragowo, Poland	15,000	Clay	(Czech Republic) Diana Sumová	(Belgium) Mathilde Devits (Ukraine) Anastasiya Shoshyna	4–6, 2–6
Win	Aug 2017	ITF Mragowo, Poland	15,000	Clay	(Italy) Camilla Rosatello	(United Kingdom) Maia Lumsden (Netherlands) Merel Hoedt	6–4, 6–4
Loss	Jun 2018	ITF Barcelona, Spain	25,000	Clay	(Brazil) Carolina Alves	(United States) Jessica Ho (China) Wang Xiyu	3–6, 1–6
